= 1994–95 Paris Saint-Germain FC season =

25th season in existence of Paris Saint-Germain

Paris Saint-Germain
1994–95 season
- President: Michel Denisot
- Manager: Luis Fernandez
- Stadium: Parc des Princes
- Division 1: 3rd
- Coupe de France: Winners
- Coupe de la Ligue: Winners
- UEFA Champions League: Semi-finals
- Top goalscorer: League: Raí (12); All: George Weah (18)
- Average home league attendance: 33,348
Home colours	Away colours

The 1994–95 season was Paris Saint-Germain's 25th season in existence. PSG played their home league games at the Parc des Princes in Paris, registering an average attendance of 33,348 spectators per match. The club was presided by Michel Denisot and the team was coached by Luis Fernandez. David Ginola began the campaign as team captain, but Fernandez quickly gave the armband to Alain Roche.

== Players ==
As of the 1994–95 season.

=== Squad ===
Note: Flags indicate national team as defined under FIFA eligibility rules; some limited exceptions apply. Players may hold more than one non-FIFA nationality.

No.	Pos.	Nation	Player
—	GK	FRA	Bernard Lama
—	GK	FRA	Luc Borrelli
—	DF	FRA	Patrick Colleter
—	DF	FRA	Alain Roche (captain)
—	DF	FRA	Oumar Dieng
—	DF	FRA	José Cobos
—	DF	BRA	Ricardo
—	DF	FRA	Francis Llacer
—	DF	FRA	Antoine Kombouaré
—	DF	FRA	Didier Domi
—	MF	FRA	Bernard Allou

No.	Pos.	Nation	Player
—	MF	FRA	Paul Le Guen
—	MF	FRA	Pierre Ducrocq
—	MF	FRA	Daniel Bravo
—	MF	FRA	Vincent Guérin
—	MF	BRA	Valdo
—	MF	BRA	Raí
—	FW	FRA	Jean-Philippe Séchet
—	FW	CMR	Patrick M'Boma
—	FW	FRA	Pascal Nouma
—	FW	LBR	George Weah
—	FW	FRA	David Ginola (captain)

=== Out on loan ===
Note: Flags indicate national team as defined under FIFA eligibility rules; some limited exceptions apply. Players may hold more than one non-FIFA nationality.

No.	Pos.	Nation	Player
—	GK	FRA	Richard Dutruel (at Caen)
—	GK	FRA	Vincent Fernandez (at Châteauroux)
—	DF	FRA	Jean-Claude Fernandes (at Nancy)

No.	Pos.	Nation	Player
—	MF	FRA	Roméo Calenda (at Châteauroux)
—	MF	FRA	Xavier Gravelaine (at Strasbourg)

== Transfers ==
As of the 1994–95 season.

=== Arrivals ===
Note: Flags indicate national team as defined under FIFA eligibility rules; some limited exceptions apply. Players may hold more than one non-FIFA nationality.

No.	Pos.	Nation	Player
—	GK	FRA	Vincent Fernandez (from PSG Academy)
—	DF	FRA	Oumar Dieng (from Lille)
—	DF	FRA	Didier Domi (from PSG Academy)
—	DF	FRA	Jean-Marie Stéphanopoli (from PSG Academy)
—	MF	FRA	Bernard Allou (from PSG Academy)

No.	Pos.	Nation	Player
—	MF	FRA	Pierre Ducrocq (from PSG Academy)
—	FW	FRA	Jean-Philippe Séchet (from Metz)
—	FW	CMR	Patrick M'Boma (from Châteauroux, end of loan)
—	FW	FRA	Pascal Nouma (from Caen, end of loan)

=== Departures ===
Note: Flags indicate national team as defined under FIFA eligibility rules; some limited exceptions apply. Players may hold more than one non-FIFA nationality.

No.	Pos.	Nation	Player
—	GK	FRA	Richard Dutruel (loaned to Caen)
—	GK	FRA	Vincent Fernandez (loaned to Châteauroux)
—	DF	FRA	Jean-Claude Fernandes (loaned to Nancy)
—	DF	FRA	Jean-Luc Sassus (to Lyon)
—	DF	FRA	Jean-Marie Stéphanopoli (to Red Star)

No.	Pos.	Nation	Player
—	MF	FRA	Roméo Calenda (loaned to Châteauroux)
—	MF	FRA	Laurent Fournier (to Bordeaux)
—	MF	FRA	Xavier Gravelaine (loaned to Strasbourg)
—	MF	FRA	Pierre Reynaud (to Toulouse)
—	FW	FRA	François Calderaro (to Toulouse)

== Kits ==
SEAT, Tourtel, and Lipton were the shirt sponsors, and Nike was the kit supplier.

Home	Away

== Competitions ==
=== Overview ===
Competition	First match	Last match	Starting round	Final position	Record							
Competition	First match	Last match	Starting round	Final position	Pld	W	D	L	GF	GA	GD	Win %
Division 1	29 July 1994	31 May 1995	Matchday 1	3rd	38	20	7	11	58	41	+17	52.63
Coupe de France	15 January 1995	13 May 1995	Round of 64	Winners	6	5	1	0	9	1	+8	83.33
Coupe de la Ligue	4 January 1995	3 May 1995	Round of 32	Winners	5	5	0	0	9	1	+8	100.00
UEFA Champions League	10 August 1994	19 April 1995	Qualifying round	Semi-finals	12	9	1	2	20	9	+11	75.00
Total					61	39	9	13	96	52	+44	63.93

Source: Competitions

=== Division 1 ===
==== League table ====
Pos	Team	Pld	W	D	L	GF	GA	GD	Pts	Qualification or relegation
1	Nantes (C)	38	21	16	1	71	34	+37	79	Qualification to Champions League group stage
2	Lyon	38	19	12	7	56	38	+18	69	Qualification to UEFA Cup first round
3	Paris Saint-Germain	38	20	7	11	58	41	+17	67	Qualification to Cup Winners' Cup first round (Note: Paris Saint-Germain qualified for the 1995–96 UEFA Cup Winners' Cup as winners of the 1994–95 Coupe de France and 1994–95 Coupe de la Ligue.)
4	Auxerre	38	15	17	6	59	34	+25	62	Qualification to UEFA Cup first round
5	Lens	38	15	14	9	48	44	+4	59	Qualification to UEFA Cup first round

Source: Ligue 1
Rules for classification: 1) points; 2) goal difference; 3) number of goals scored.
(C) Champions

==== Results by round ====
Round	1	2	3	4	5	6	7	8	9	10	11	12	13	14	15	16	17	18	19	20	21	22	23	24	25	26	27	28	29	30	31	32	33	34	35	36	37	38
Ground	A	H	A	H	A	H	A	H	A	H	A	H	A	A	H	A	H	A	H	A	H	A	H	A	H	A	H	A	H	A	H	H	A	H	A	H	A	H
Result	D	W	L	D	L	W	W	W	L	D	W	W	L	W	W	D	W	W	D	W	W	W	L	L	W	L	W	D	W	L	W	L	W	W	L	W	L	D
Position	13	8	12	11	15	11	8	6	9	9	6	3	6	4	2	2	2	2	2	2	2	2	2	3	2	3	2	2	3	3	3	3	3	3	3	3	3	3

Source: Histoire du PSG
A = Away; H = Home; W = Win; D = Draw; L = Loss

==== Matches ====
29 July 1994 1	Le Havre	0–0	Paris Saint-Germain	Le Havre
20:00 CEST (UTC+2)		Report		Stadium: Stade Jules Deschaseaux; Attendance: 11,000; Referee: Claude Colombo

2 August 1994 2	Paris Saint-Germain	1–0	Lens	Paris
20:00 CEST (UTC+2)	Nouma 40'	Report		Stadium: Parc des Princes; Attendance: 27,300; Referee: Jean-Claude Puyalt

5 August 1994 3	Strasbourg	2–0	Paris Saint-Germain	Strasbourg
20:00 CEST (UTC+2)	Leboeuf 25' (pen.); Gravelaine 38'	Report		Stadium: Stade de la Meinau; Attendance: 24,951; Referee: Alain Sars

13 August 1994 4	Paris Saint-Germain	1–1	Sochaux	Paris
20:00 CEST (UTC+2)	Ginola 68' (pen.)	Report	Baudry 89'	Stadium: Parc des Princes; Attendance: 24,095; Referee: Georges Ramos

19 August 1994 5	Nantes	1–0	Paris Saint-Germain	Nantes
20:00 CEST (UTC+2)	Loko 18'	Report		Stadium: Stade de la Beaujoire; Attendance: 25,000; Referee: Bernard Saules

27 August 1994 6	Paris Saint-Germain	1–0	Monaco	Paris
20:00 CEST (UTC+2)	Weah 52'	Report		Stadium: Parc des Princes; Attendance: 37,280; Referee: Antoine de Pandis

31 August 1994 7	Bastia	1–2	Paris Saint-Germain	Furiani
20:00 CEST (UTC+2)	Drobnjak 75' (pen.)	Report	Ginola 21', 55' (pen.)	Stadium: Stade Armand-Cesari; Attendance: 8,000; Referee: Didier Pauchard

10 September 1994 8	Paris Saint-Germain	3–0	Metz	Paris
20:00 CEST (UTC+2)	Colleter 7'; Ricardo 31'; Raí 68'	Report		Stadium: Parc des Princes; Attendance: 31,224; Referee: Rémy Harrel

18 September 1994 9	Lyon	2–0	Paris Saint-Germain	Lyon
18:00 CEST (UTC+2)	Debbah 58'; Paille 90'	Report		Stadium: Stade de Gerland; Attendance: 25,000; Referee: Marcel Lainé

23 September 1994 10	Paris Saint-Germain	1–1	Auxerre	Paris
20:00 CEST (UTC+2)	Weah 77'	Report	Lamouchi 67'	Stadium: Parc des Princes; Attendance: 33,644; Referee: Marc Batta

1 October 1994 11	Caen	1–2	Paris Saint-Germain	Caen
20:00 CEST (UTC+2)	Dedebant 87'	Report	Llacer 55'; Germain 78' (o.g.)	Stadium: Stade Michel d'Ornano; Attendance: 16,414; Referee: Patrick Anton

11 October 1994 12	Paris Saint-Germain	3–0	Lille	Paris
20:00 CEST (UTC+2)	Weah 8', 78'; Raí 25'	Report		Stadium: Parc des Princes; Attendance: 31,257; Referee: Philippe Kalt

14 October 1994 13	Cannes	3–2	Paris Saint-Germain	Cannes
20:00 CEST (UTC+2)	Kozniku 67'; Micoud 74'; Horlaville 81'	Report	Ginola 59' (pen.); Valdo 90'	Stadium: Stade Pierre de Coubertin; Attendance: 11,000; Referee: Didier Pauchard

22 October 1994 14	Nice	0–4	Paris Saint-Germain	Nice
20:00 CEST (UTC+2)		Report	Raí 20', 68'; Weah 31'; Nouma 70'	Stadium: Stade du Ray; Attendance: 8,985; Referee: Bernard Saules

28 October 1994 15	Paris Saint-Germain	3–1	Montpellier	Paris
20:00 CEST (UTC+2)	Le Guen 29'; Raí 56' (pen.); Weah 62'	Report	Carotti 65'	Stadium: Parc des Princes; Attendance: 37,020; Referee: Philippe Leduc

5 November 1994 16	Martigues	1–1	Paris Saint-Germain	Martigues
20:00 CEST (UTC+2)	Bouquet 19'	Report	M'Boma 39'	Stadium: Stade Francis Turcan; Attendance: 8,000; Referee: Antoine de Pandis

9 November 1994 17	Paris Saint-Germain	2–1	Rennes	Paris
20:00 CEST (UTC+2)	Raí 24', 63'	Report	Gourvennec 15'	Stadium: Parc des Princes; Attendance: 33,402; Referee: Gilles Veissière

19 November 1994 18	Saint-Étienne	1–3	Paris Saint-Germain	Saint-Étienne
20:00 CEST (UTC+2)	Moreau 36'	Report	Le Guen 38'; Roche 44'; Séchet 89'	Stadium: Stade Geoffroy-Guichard; Attendance: 26,177; Referee: Rémy Harrel

26 November 1994 19	Paris Saint-Germain	0–0	Bordeaux	Paris
20:00 CEST (UTC+2)		Report		Stadium: Parc des Princes; Attendance: 44,464; Referee: Marc Batta

2 December 1994 20	Lens	1–2	Paris Saint-Germain	Lens
20:00 CEST (UTC+2)	Debève 51' (pen.)	Report	Raí 12'; Allou 79'	Stadium: Stade Bollaert-Delelis; Attendance: 30,217; Referee: Claude Colombo

17 December 1994 21	Paris Saint-Germain	1–0	Strasbourg	Paris
20:00 CEST (UTC+2)	Ginola 32' (pen.)	Report		Stadium: Parc des Princes; Attendance: 29,061; Referee: Didier Pauchard

11 January 1995 23	Paris Saint-Germain	0–3	Nantes	Paris
20:30 CEST (UTC+2)			Loko 36'; N'Doram 62', 74'	Stadium: Parc des Princes; Attendance: 45,266; Referee: Gilles Veissière

29 January 1995 24	Monaco	2–1	Paris Saint-Germain	Monaco
18:30 CEST (UTC+2)	Anderson 41'; Madar 83'	Report	Ginola 32'	Stadium: Stade Louis II; Attendance: 10,000; Referee: Patrick Anton

1 February 1995 22	Sochaux	1–2	Paris Saint-Germain	Montbéliard
20:00 CEST (UTC+2)	Vos 47' (pen.)	Report 1 Report 2	Ginola 43' (pen.); Weah 83'	Stadium: Stade Auguste-Bonal; Attendance: 5,041; Referee: Jean-Claude Puyalt
Note: Match originally scheduled on 7 January, but postponed due to bad weather.

8 February 1995 25	Paris Saint-Germain	3–0	Bastia	Paris
20:30 CEST (UTC+2)	Ginola 10', 61'; Ricardo 25'	Report		Stadium: Parc des Princes; Attendance: 35,406; Referee: Alain Sars

11 February 1995 26	Metz	2–0	Paris Saint-Germain	Metz
20:00 CEST (UTC+2)	Pouget 49'; Kastendeuch 76' (pen.)	Report		Stadium: Stade Saint-Symphorien; Attendance: 14,492; Referee: Georges Ramos

23 February 1995 27	Paris Saint-Germain	4–1	Lyon	Paris
20:45 CEST (UTC+2)	Valdo 12', 80'; Ginola 88'; Raí 89'	Report	Rivenet 59'	Stadium: Parc des Princes; Attendance: 36,554; Referee: Marc Batta

5 March 1995 28	Auxerre	1–1	Paris Saint-Germain	Auxerre
18:30 CEST (UTC+2)	Baticle 24'	Report	Guérin 11'	Stadium: Stade de l'Abbé-Deschamps; Attendance: 10,000; Referee: Philippe Leduc

22 March 1995 30	Lille	1–0	Paris Saint-Germain	Lille
20:00 CEST (UTC+2)	Friis-Hansen 55'	Report		Stadium: Stade Grimonprez-Jooris; Attendance: 12,000; Referee: Rémy Harrel

31 March 1995 31	Paris Saint-Germain	2–1	Cannes	Paris
20:30 CEST (UTC+2)	Cobos 17'; Ginola 36'		Charvet 69'	Stadium: Parc des Princes; Attendance: 32,725; Referee: Bernard Saules

8 April 1995 32	Paris Saint-Germain	2–3	Nice	Paris
20:00 CEST (UTC+2)	Nouma 24'; Raí 90+2'	Report 1 Report 2	Dieng 34' (o.g.); Sandjak 54'; Chaouch 70'	Stadium: Parc des Princes; Attendance: 33,230; Referee: Stéphane Bré

14 April 1995 33	Montpellier	0–3	Paris Saint-Germain	Montpellier
20:00 CEST (UTC+2)			Séchet 48'; Nouma 58'; Raí 76'	Stadium: Stade de la Mosson; Attendance: 13,614; Referee: Claude Colombo

29 April 1995 34	Paris Saint-Germain	3–0	Martigues	Paris
20:00 CEST (UTC+2)	Raí 53'; Kombouaré 85'; Allou 89'	Report		Stadium: Parc des Princes; Attendance: 29,983; Referee: Patrick Anton

6 May 1995 35	Rennes	4–0	Paris Saint-Germain	Rennes
20:00 CEST (UTC+2)	Carteron 15'; Grassi 20', 37' (pen.); André 76'	Report		Stadium: Roazhon Park; Attendance: 15,931; Referee: Alain Sars

17 May 1995 29	Paris Saint-Germain	2–0	Caen	Paris
20:30 CEST (UTC+2)	Roche 42'; Allou 56'	Report 1 Report 2		Stadium: Parc des Princes; Attendance: 24,471; Referee: Claude Colombo
Note: Match originally scheduled on 10 March, but postponed due to fixture congestion from Paris Saint-Germain.

20 May 1995 36	Paris Saint-Germain	1–0	Saint-Étienne	Paris
20:00 CEST (UTC+2)	Blanc 83' (o.g.)	Report		Stadium: Parc des Princes; Attendance: 41,396; Referee: Antoine de Pandis

27 May 1995 37	Bordeaux	3–0	Paris Saint-Germain	Bordeaux
20:00 CEST (UTC+2)	Valdeir 16'; Histilloles 77'; Zidane 85'	Report		Stadium: Stade Chaban-Delmas; Attendance: 19,000; Referee: Georges Ramos

31 May 1995 38	Paris Saint-Germain	2–2	Le Havre	Paris
20:00 CEST (UTC+2)	Guérin 59'; Nouma 90'	Report	Caveglia 7' (pen.); Daury 54'	Stadium: Parc des Princes; Attendance: 25,839; Referee: Patrick Anton

=== Coupe de France ===
15 January 1995 Round of 64	Paris Saint-Germain	3–1 (a.e.t.)	Rennes	Paris
16:15 CET (UTC+1)	Le Guen 33'; Denis 94' (o.g.); Weah 118'	Report	Grassi 87' (pen.)	Stadium: Parc des Princes; Attendance: 17,819; Referee: Claude Colombo

4 February 1995 Round of 32	Martigues	0–1	Paris Saint-Germain	Martigues
20:45 CET (UTC+1)		Report	Valdo 41'	Stadium: Stade Francis Turcan; Attendance: 6,000; Referee: Gilles Chéron

8 March 1995 Round of 16	Le Havre	0–0 (a.e.t.) (3–4 p)	Paris Saint-Germain	Le Havre
20:45 CET (UTC+1)		Report		Stadium: Stade Jules Deschaseaux; Attendance: 14,477; Referee: Gilles Chéron

18 March 1995 Quarter-finals	Nancy	0–2	Paris Saint-Germain	Tomblaine
20:00 CET (UTC+1)		Report	Ricardo 45', 57'	Stadium: Stade Marcel Picot; Attendance: 16,976; Referee: Bernard Saules

11 April 1995 Semi-finals	Paris Saint-Germain	2–0	Marseille	Paris
20:45 CET (UTC+1)	Ricardo 4'; Weah 33'	Report 1 Report 2		Stadium: Parc des Princes; Attendance: 43,211; Referee: Didier Pauchard

13 May 1995 Final	Paris Saint-Germain	1–0	Strasbourg	Paris
20:00 CET (UTC+1)	Le Guen 48'	Report		Stadium: Parc des Princes; Attendance: 46,698; Referee: Philippe Leduc

=== Coupe de la Ligue ===
4 January 1995 Round of 32	Paris Saint-Germain	1–0	Auxerre	Paris
20:45 CET (UTC+1)	Guérin 73'			Stadium: Parc des Princes; Attendance: 22,078; Referee: Bernard Saules

24 January 1995 Round of 16	Paris Saint-Germain	2–1	Lyon	Paris
20:00 CET (UTC+1)	Valdo 2', 71'		Deplace 28'	Stadium: Parc des Princes; Attendance: 15,056; Referee: Antoine de Pandis

14 February 1995 Quarter-finals	Paris Saint-Germain	3–0	Toulouse	Paris
18:00 CET (UTC+1)	Weah 7'; Kombouaré 18'; M'Boma 62'			Stadium: Parc des Princes; Attendance: 9,872; Referee: Marcel Lainé

25 March 1995 Semi-finals	Le Havre	0–1	Paris Saint-Germain	Le Havre
15:30 CET (UTC+1)		Report 2	Raí 55' (pen.)	Stadium: Stade Jules Deschaseaux; Attendance: 9,114; Referee: Georges Ramos

3 May 1995 Final	Paris Saint-Germain	2–0	Bastia	Paris
21:00 CEST (UTC+2)	Roche 21'; Raí 84'			Stadium: Parc des Princes; Attendance: 24,663; Referee: Marcel Lainé

=== UEFA Champions League ===
==== Qualifying round ====
10 August 1994 First leg	Paris Saint-Germain (France)	3–0	(Hungary) Vác Samsung	Paris, France
20:30 CEST (UTC+2)	Ricardo Gomes 29'; Weah 48'; Roche 83'	Report		Stadium: Parc des Princes; Attendance: 29,637; Referee: Antonio López Nieto (Spain)

24 August 1994 Second leg	Vác Samsung (Hungary)	1–2 (1–5 agg.)	(France) Paris Saint-Germain	Budapest, Hungary
20:00 CEST (UTC+2)	Füle 31'	Report	M'Boma 20', 66'	Stadium: Illovszky Rudolf Stadion; Attendance: 1,500; Referee: Angelo Amendolia (Italy)

==== Group stage ====
Pos	Team	Pld	W	D	L	GF	GA	GD	Pts	Qualification	PAR	BAY	SPM	DKV
1	(France) Paris Saint-Germain	6	6	0	0	12	3	+9	12	Advance to knockout stage	—	2–0	4–1	1–0
2	(Germany) Bayern Munich	6	2	2	2	8	7	+1	6	Advance to knockout stage	0–1	—	2–2	1–0
3	(Russia) Spartak Moscow	6	1	2	3	8	12	−4	4		1–2	1–1	—	1–0
4	(Ukraine) Dynamo Kyiv	6	1	0	5	5	11	−6	2		1–2	1–4	3–2	—

Source: UEFA

14 September 1994 1	Paris Saint-Germain (France)	2–0	(Germany) Bayern Munich	Paris, France
20:30	Weah 41'; Bravo 83'	Report		Stadium: Parc des Princes; Attendance: 36,924; Referee: David Elleray (England)

28 September 1994 2	Spartak Moscow (Russia)	1–2	(France) Paris Saint-Germain	Moscow, Russia
19:15	Rakhimov 41'	Report	Le Guen 53'; Valdo 59'	Stadium: Luzhniki Stadium; Attendance: 47,000; Referee: Bo Karlsson (Sweden)

19 October 1994 3	Dynamo Kyiv (Ukraine)	1–2	(France) Paris Saint-Germain	Kyiv, Ukraine
21:30	Leonenko 33' (pen.)	Report	Guérin 26'; Weah 75'	Stadium: Olimpiyskyi National Sports Complex; Attendance: 93,700; Referee: Piero Ceccarini (Italy)

2 November 1994 4	Paris Saint-Germain (France)	1–0	(Ukraine) Dynamo Kyiv	Paris, France
20:30	Weah 68'	Report		Stadium: Parc des Princes; Attendance: 33,741; Referee: Ahmet Çakar (Turkey)

23 November 1994 5	Bayern Munich (Germany)	0–1	(France) Paris Saint-Germain	Munich, Germany
20:30		Report	Weah 80'	Stadium: Olympiastadion; Attendance: 46,000; Referee: Manuel Díaz Vega (Spain)

7 December 1994 6	Paris Saint-Germain (France)	4–1	(Russia) Spartak Moscow	Paris, France
20:30	Weah 30', 52'; Ginola 42'; Raí 59'	Report	Rodionov 67'	Stadium: Parc des Princes; Attendance: 31,461; Referee: Atanas Uzunov (Bulgaria)

==== Knockout phase ====
===== Quarter-finals =====
1 March 1995 First leg	Barcelona (Spain)	1–1	(France) Paris Saint-Germain	Barcelona, Spain
21:00 CET (UTC+1)	Korneev 47'	Report	Weah 54'	Stadium: Camp Nou; Attendance: 115,000; Referee: Václav Krondl (Czech Republic)

15 March 1995 Second leg	Paris Saint-Germain (France)	2–1 (3–2 agg.)	(Spain) Barcelona	Paris, France
21:15 CET (UTC+1)	Raí 72'; Guérin 83'	Report	Bakero 50'	Stadium: Parc des Princes; Attendance: 45,604; Referee: Gerd Grabher (Austria)

===== Semi-finals =====
5 April 1995 First leg	Paris Saint-Germain (France)	0–1	(Italy) AC Milan	Paris, France
20:30 CEST (UTC+2)		Report	Boban 90'	Stadium: Parc des Princes; Attendance: 44,965; Referee: Serge Muhmenthaler (Switzerland)

19 April 1995 Second leg	AC Milan (Italy)	2–0 (3–0 agg.)	(France) Paris Saint-Germain	Milan, Italy
20:30 CEST (UTC+2)	Savićević 21', 68'			Stadium: San Siro; Attendance: 79,855; Referee: Leslie Mottram (Scotland)

== Statistics ==
As of the 1994–95 season.

=== Appearances and goals ===
No.	Pos	Nat	Player	Total		Division 1		Coupe de France		Coupe de la Ligue		UEFA Champions League	
No.	Pos	Nat	Player	Apps	Goals	Apps	Goals	Apps	Goals	Apps	Goals	Apps	Goals
Goalkeepers
	GK	(France) FRA	Bernard Lama	55	0	36	0	6	0	1	0	12	0
	GK	(France) FRA	Luc Borrelli	6	0	2	0	0	0	4	0	0	0
Defenders
	DF	(France) FRA	Alain Roche	53	4	32	2	6	0	4	1	11	1
	DF	(France) FRA	Patrick Colleter	43	1	28	1	4	0	3	0	8	0
	DF	(France) FRA	Francis Llacer	43	1	28	1	5	0	3	0	7	0
	DF	(France) FRA	Antoine Kombouaré	42	2	26	1	4	0	4	1	8	0
	DF	(France) FRA	José Cobos	41	1	25	1	4	0	2	0	10	0
	DF	(France) FRA	Oumar Dieng	35	0	22	0	2	0	3	0	8	0
	DF	(Brazil) BRA	Ricardo	28	6	16	2	4	3	3	0	5	1
	DF	(France) FRA	Didier Domi	1	0	0	0	0	0	1	0	0	0
Midfielders
	MF	(France) FRA	Paul Le Guen	55	5	35	2	5	2	3	0	12	1
	MF	(France) FRA	Daniel Bravo	52	1	32	0	5	0	3	0	12	1
	MF	(France) FRA	Vincent Guérin	49	5	30	2	4	0	3	1	12	2
	MF	(Brazil) BRA	Raí	44	16	28	12	5	0	4	2	7	2
	MF	(Brazil) BRA	Valdo	40	7	25	3	4	1	3	2	8	1
	MF	(France) FRA	Bernard Allou	12	3	7	3	2	0	2	0	1	0
	MF	(France) FRA	Pierre Ducrocq	4	0	2	0	0	0	2	0	0	0
Forwards
	FW	(Liberia) LBR	George Weah	53	18	34	7	5	2	3	1	11	8
	FW	(France) FRA	David Ginola	43	12	28	11	2	0	3	0	10	1
	FW	(France) FRA	Pascal Nouma	38	5	24	5	5	0	5	0	4	0
	FW	(France) FRA	Jean-Philippe Séchet	34	2	24	2	3	0	3	0	4	0
	FW	(Cameroon) CMR	Patrick M'Boma	13	4	8	1	2	0	2	1	1	2

Source: Competitions
