= 1996–97 Paris Saint-Germain FC season =

27th season in existence of Paris Saint-Germain

Paris Saint-Germain
1996–97 season
- President: Michel Denisot
- Manager: Ricardo
- Stadium: Parc des Princes
- Division 1: 2nd
- Coupe de France: Round of 16
- Coupe de la Ligue: Round of 32
- UEFA Cup Winners' Cup: Runners-up
- UEFA Super Cup: Runners-up
- Top goalscorer: League: Patrice Loko (15); All: Patrice Loko (21)
- Average home league attendance: 35,302
Home colours	Away colours	Third colours

The 1996–97 season was Paris Saint-Germain's 27th season in existence. PSG played their home league games at the Parc des Princes in Paris, registering an average attendance of 35,302 spectators per match. The club was presided by Michel Denisot and the team was coached by Ricardo. Raí was the team captain.

== Players ==
As of the 1996–97 season.

=== Squad ===
Note: Flags indicate national team as defined under FIFA eligibility rules; some limited exceptions apply. Players may hold more than one non-FIFA nationality.

No.	Pos.	Nation	Player
—	GK	FRA	Bernard Lama
—	GK	FRA	Vincent Fernandez
—	DF	FRA	Jimmy Algerino
—	DF	FRA	Alain Roche
—	DF	FRA	Bruno Ngotty
—	DF	FRA	Paul Le Guen
—	DF	FRA	Didier Domi
—	DF	FRA	José Cobos
—	MF	FRA	Benoît Cauet
—	MF	POR	Kenedy

No.	Pos.	Nation	Player
—	MF	BRA	Leonardo
—	MF	FRA	Jérôme Leroy
—	MF	FRA	Laurent Fournier
—	MF	FRA	Vincent Guérin
—	MF	BRA	Raí (captain)
—	MF	FRA	Bernard Allou
—	FW	CMR	Patrick M'Boma
—	FW	FRA	Cyrille Pouget
—	FW	FRA	Patrice Loko
—	FW	PAN	Julio Dely Valdés

=== Out on loan ===
Note: Flags indicate national team as defined under FIFA eligibility rules; some limited exceptions apply. Players may hold more than one non-FIFA nationality.

No.	Pos.	Nation	Player
—	DF	FRA	Francis Llacer (at Strasbourg)
—	MF	FRA	Pierre Ducrocq (at Laval)

No.	Pos.	Nation	Player
—	MF	ALB	Edvin Murati (at Stade Briochin)
—	MF	FRA	Christophe Odé (at Laval)

== Kits ==
Opel was the shirt sponsor, and Nike was the kit manufacturer.

Home	Away	Third

== Pre-season and friendlies ==
Win Draw Loss

19 July 1996 Friendly	Châteauroux (France)	9–1	(France) Paris Saint-Germain	France

24 July 1996 Friendly	Paris Saint-Germain (France)	3–0	(Portugal) Vitória de Guimarães	USA
				Attendance: 0

27 July 1996 Friendly	Club Brugge (Belgium)	2–0	(France) Paris Saint-Germain	Belgium

3 August 1996 Friendly	Lille (France)	0–4	(France) Paris Saint-Germain	France

5 January 1997 Friendly	Réunion	3–4	(France) Paris Saint-Germain	Saint-Denis, Réunion

8 January 1997 Friendly	Mauritius	2–2	(France) Paris Saint-Germain	Curepipe, Mauritius
				Stadium: Stade George V

18 February 1997 Friendly	Paris Saint-Germain (France)	1–1	(France) Paris Saint-Germain B	France
		Report

29 May 1997 Friendly	Real Madrid (Spain)	4–1	(France) Paris Saint-Germain	Madrid, Spain
		Report		Stadium: Santiago Bernabéu; Attendance: 30,000

== Competitions ==
=== Overall record ===
Competition	First match	Last match	Starting round	Final position	Record							
Competition	First match	Last match	Starting round	Final position	Pld	W	D	L	GF	GA	GD	Win %
Division 1	10 August 1996	24 May 1997	Matchday 1	2nd	38	18	13	7	57	31	+26	47.37
Coupe de France	19 January 1997	1 March 1997	Round of 64	Round of 16	3	2	1	0	9	4	+5	66.67
Coupe de la Ligue	10 December 1996		Round of 32	Round of 32	1	0	0	1	1	2	−1	0.00
UEFA Cup Winners' Cup	12 September 1996	14 May 1997	First round	Runners-up	9	5	1	3	19	7	+12	55.56
UEFA Super Cup	15 January 1997	5 February 1997	Final	Runners-up	2	0	0	2	2	9	−7	0.00
Total					53	25	15	13	88	53	+35	47.17

Source: Competitions

=== Division 1 ===
==== League table ====
Pos	Team	Pld	W	D	L	GF	GA	GD	Pts	Qualification or relegation
1	Monaco (C)	38	23	10	5	69	30	+39	79	Qualification to Champions League group stage
2	Paris Saint-Germain	38	18	13	7	57	31	+26	67	Qualification to Champions League second qualifying round
3	Nantes	38	16	16	6	61	32	+29	64	Qualification to UEFA Cup first round
4	Bordeaux	38	16	15	7	59	42	+17	63	Qualification to UEFA Cup first round
5	Metz	38	17	11	10	40	30	+10	62	Qualification to UEFA Cup first round

Source: Ligue 1
Rules for classification: 1) points; 2) goal difference; 3) number of goals scored.
(C) Champions

==== Results summary ====
Overall								Home						Away					
Pld	W	D	L	GF	GA	GD	Pts	W	D	L	GF	GA	GD	W	D	L	GF	GA	GD
38	18	13	7	57	31	+26	67	10	8	1	35	12	+23	8	5	6	22	19	+3

Source: Division 1

==== Results by round ====
Round	1	2	3	4	5	6	7	8	9	10	11	12	13	14	15	16	17	18	19	20	21	22	23	24	25	26	27	28	29	30	31	32	33	34	35	36	37	38
Ground	A	H	A	H	A	H	A	H	A	A	H	A	H	A	H	A	H	A	H	A	H	A	H	A	H	A	H	H	A	H	A	H	A	H	A	H	A	H
Result	W	W	D	W	W	D	W	W	D	D	W	W	D	L	W	W	W	L	D	W	L	D	D	L	D	W	D	W	L	W	L	D	D	W	W	D	L	W
Position	8	3	4	2	1	1	1	1	1	1	1	1	1	1	1	1	1	1	1	1	2	2	2	2	2	2	2	2	2	2	2	2	2	2	2	2	3	2

Source: Division 1
A = Away; H = Home; W = Win; D = Draw; L = Loss

==== Matches ====
10 August 1996 1	Strasbourg	0–1	Paris Saint-Germain	Strasbourg
20:00 CEST (UTC+2)			Leonardo 32'	Stadium: Stade de la Meinau; Attendance: 20,975; Referee: Claude Colombo

16 August 1996 2	Paris Saint-Germain	2–0	Caen	Paris
20:00 CEST (UTC+2)	Mboma 84'; Loko 89'			Stadium: Parc des Princes; Attendance: 24,713; Referee: Marc Batta

23 August 1996 3	Nancy	0–0	Paris Saint-Germain	Tomblaine
20:00 CEST (UTC+2)				Stadium: Stade Marcel Picot; Attendance: 11,988; Referee: Éric Poulat

28 August 1996 4	Paris Saint-Germain	1–0	Nantes	Paris
20:00 CEST (UTC+2)	Loko 34'			Stadium: Parc des Princes; Attendance: 33,809; Referee: Philippe Leduc

3 September 1996 5	Montpellier	0–3	Paris Saint-Germain	Montpellier
20:00 CEST (UTC+2)			Valdés 56'; Leonardo 78'; Fournier 82'	Stadium: Stade de la Mosson; Attendance: 14,030; Referee: Jean-Claude Puyalt

6 September 1996 6	Paris Saint-Germain	0–0	Monaco	Paris
20:00 CEST (UTC+2)				Stadium: Parc des Princes; Attendance: 40,529; Referee: Stéphane Bré

15 September 1996 7	Cannes	0–1	Paris Saint-Germain	Cannes
20:30 CEST (UTC+2)			Raí 72'	Stadium: Stade Pierre De Coubertin; Attendance: 10,000; Referee: Serge Leon

20 September 1996 8	Paris Saint-Germain	4–0	Lens	Paris
20:00 CEST (UTC+2)	Leonardo 17', 83'; Raí 35'; Anelka 80'			Stadium: Parc des Princes; Attendance: 36,312; Referee: Alain Sars

29 September 1996 9	Guingamp	2–2	Paris Saint-Germain	Guingamp
20:30 CEST (UTC+2)	Carnot 8'; Rouxel 15'		Leonardo 25'; Raí 75'	Stadium: Stade de Roudourou; Attendance: 12,000; Referee: Gilles Chéron

2 October 1996 10	Lyon	1–1	Paris Saint-Germain	Lyon
20:00 CEST (UTC+2)	Gava 57'		Valdés 66'	Stadium: Stade de Gerland; Attendance: 29,740; Referee: Claude Colombo

5 October 1996 11	Paris Saint-Germain	2–0	Le Havre	Paris
20:00 CEST (UTC+2)	Leonardo 37'; Cauet 48'			Stadium: Parc des Princes; Attendance: 32,196; Referee: Patrick Anton

12 October 1996 12	Metz	0–1	Paris Saint-Germain	Metz
20:00 CEST (UTC+2)			Leonardo 32'	Stadium: Stade Saint-Symphorien; Attendance: 17,721; Referee: Rémi Harrel

20 October 1996 13	Paris Saint-Germain	1–1	Auxerre	Paris
20:30 CEST (UTC+2)	Cauet 36'		Sibierski 90' (pen.)	Stadium: Parc des Princes; Attendance: 39,885; Referee: Marc Batta

25 October 1996 14	Rennes	2–1	Paris Saint-Germain	Rennes
20:00 CEST (UTC+2)	Guivarc'h 69' (pen.), 82'		Loko 90'	Stadium: Stade de la Route de Lorient; Attendance: 19,500; Referee: Jean-Claude Puyalt

3 November 1996 15	Paris Saint-Germain	3–0	Bastia	Paris
20:30 CET (UTC+1)	Loko 8'; Valdés 72', 86'			Stadium: Parc des Princes; Attendance: 34,856; Referee: Gilles Chéron

6 November 1996 16	Nice	0–1	Paris Saint-Germain	Nice
20:00 CET (UTC+1)			Loko 66'	Stadium: Stade du Ray; Attendance: 6,706; Referee: Philippe Kalt

13 November 1996 17	Paris Saint-Germain	3–1	Lille	Paris
20:00 CET (UTC+1)	Valdés 26', 56'; Ngotty 33'		Collot 42'	Stadium: Parc des Princes; Attendance: 31,879; Referee: Serge Leon

16 November 1996 18	Bordeaux	5–3	Paris Saint-Germain	Bordeaux
20:00 CET (UTC+1)	Papin 4', 52' (pen.); Micoud 30'; Biaggio 71'; Diawara 83'		Loko 36'; Raí 42'; Valdés 62'	Stadium: Parc Lescure; Attendance: 30,997; Referee: Philippe Leduc

22 November 1996 19	Paris Saint-Germain	0–0	Marseille	Paris
20:30 CET (UTC+1)				Stadium: Parc des Princes; Attendance: 44,804; Referee: Alain Sars

29 November 1996 20	Caen	1–3	Paris Saint-Germain	Caen
20:00 CET (UTC+1)	Bajkuša 27'		Valdés 34'; Guérin 46'; Ngotty 53'	Stadium: Stade Michel d'Ornano; Attendance: 17,779; Referee: Gilles Veissière

6 December 1996 21	Paris Saint-Germain	1–2	Nancy	Paris
20:30 CET (UTC+1)	Ngotty 2'		Fischer 65'; Gray 90'	Stadium: Parc des Princes; Attendance: 31,037; Referee: Bruno Coué

14 December 1996 22	Nantes	0–0	Paris Saint-Germain	Nantes
20:00 CET (UTC+1)				Stadium: Stade de la Beaujoire; Attendance: 34,978; Referee: Claude Colombo

20 December 1996 23	Paris Saint-Germain	1–1	Montpellier	Paris
20:00 CET (UTC+1)	Loko 39'		Bakayoko 78'	Stadium: Parc des Princes; Attendance: 32,038; Referee: Stéphane Moulin

26 January 1997 24	Monaco	2–0	Paris Saint-Germain	Monaco
20:45 CET (UTC+1)	Legwinski 63'; Anderson 71'			Stadium: Stade Louis II; Attendance: 16,000; Referee: Bernard Saules

1 February 1997 25	Paris Saint-Germain	1–1	Cannes	Paris
20:00 CET (UTC+1)	Pouget 12'		Charvet 50'	Stadium: Parc des Princes; Attendance: 33,237; Referee: Laurent Duhamel

13 February 1997 26	Lens	1–2	Paris Saint-Germain	Lens
18:30 CET (UTC+1)	Camara 23'		Loko 53'; Raí 68'	Stadium: Stade Félix Bollaert; Attendance: 27,485; Referee: Marc Batta

22 February 1997 27	Paris Saint-Germain	1–1	Guingamp	Paris
20:00 CET (UTC+1)	Raí 69' (pen.)		Carnot 27'	Stadium: Parc des Princes; Attendance: 37,129; Referee: Gilles Veissière

9 March 1997 28	Paris Saint-Germain	3–1	Lyon	Paris
18:30 CET (UTC+1)	Raí 47', 88'; Loko 86'		Bardon 11'	Stadium: Parc des Princes; Attendance: 31,592; Referee: Stéphane Bré

14 March 1997 29	Le Havre	1–0	Paris Saint-Germain	Le Havre
20:00 CET (UTC+1)	Bertin 75' (pen.)			Stadium: Stade Jules Deschaseaux; Attendance: 13,351; Referee: Rémi Harrel

23 March 1997 30	Paris Saint-Germain	2–0	Metz	Paris
18:30 CET (UTC+1)	Loko 20', 24'			Stadium: Parc des Princes; Attendance: 36,309; Referee: Gilles Chéron

26 March 1997 31	Auxerre	2–1	Paris Saint-Germain	Auxerre
20:00 CET (UTC+1)	Sibierski 33'; Diomède 49'		Cauet 45'	Stadium: Stade de l'Abbé Deschamps; Attendance: 12,500; Referee: Éric Poulat

5 April 1997 32	Paris Saint-Germain	1–1	Rennes	Paris
20:00 CEST (UTC+2)	Pouget 75'		Guivarc'h 40' (pen.)	Stadium: Parc des Princes; Attendance: 33,297; Referee: Claude Colombo

15 April 1997 33	Bastia	1–1	Paris Saint-Germain	Furiani
20:30 CEST (UTC+2)	Moravčík 26'		Loko 15'	Stadium: Stade Armand-Cesari; Attendance: 10,080; Referee: Marc Batta

27 April 1997 34	Paris Saint-Germain	5–0	Nice	Paris
18:30 CEST (UTC+2)	Loko 39', 67', 75', 90'; Cauet 80'			Stadium: Parc des Princes; Attendance: 34,859; Referee: Franck Glochon

30 April 1997 35	Lille	0–1	Paris Saint-Germain	Lille
20:00 CEST (UTC+2)			Algerino 14'	Stadium: Stade Grimonprez-Jooris; Attendance: 13,000; Referee: Gilles Veissière

3 May 1997 36	Paris Saint-Germain	2–2	Bordeaux	Paris
20:00 CEST (UTC+2)	Ngotty 13'; Raí 90'		Papin 36'; Diawara 89'	Stadium: Parc des Princes; Attendance: 42,361; Referee: Bernard Saules

17 May 1997 37	Marseille	1–0	Paris Saint-Germain	Marseille
20:00 CEST (UTC+2)	Roy 39' (pen.)			Stadium: Stade Vélodrome; Attendance: 24,200; Referee: Alain Sars

24 May 1997 38	Paris Saint-Germain	2–1	Strasbourg	Paris
20:00 CEST (UTC+2)	Le Guen 62'; Guérin 88'		Dacourt 50'	Stadium: Parc des Princes; Attendance: 39,887; Referee: Philippe Leduc

=== Coupe de France ===
19 January 1997 Round of 64	Besançon	0–3	Paris Saint-Germain	Besançon
18:00 CET (UTC+1)			Renou 9' (o.g.); Pouget 70'; Maître 82' (o.g.)	Stadium: Stade Léo Lagrange; Attendance: 7,000; Referee: Patrick Anton

8 February 1997 Round of 32	US Fécamp	0–2	Paris Saint-Germain	Le Havre
20:00 CET (UTC+1)			Pouget 76'; Valdés 81'	Stadium: Stade Jules Deschaseaux; Attendance: 12,948; Referee: Philippe Leduc

1 March 1997 Round of 16	Clermont	4–4 (a.e.t.) (4–3 p)	Paris Saint-Germain	Clermont-Ferrand
20:30 CET (UTC+1)	Bessaque 51' (pen.); Chastang 69'; Le Bellec 82'; Ngotty 87' (o.g.)		Cauet 12'; Valdés 24'; Raí 57'; Loko 68'	Stadium: Stade Gabriel Montpied; Attendance: 9,000; Referee: Philippe Kalt
	Penalties
	Amblard (penalty scored); Cohade (penalty scored); Chastang (penalty scored); Ribérol (penalty scored)		(penalty scored) Pouget; (penalty missed) Le Guen; (penalty scored) Raí; (penalty scored) Valdés; (penalty missed) Guérin

=== Coupe de la Ligue ===
10 December 1996 Round of 32	Lyon	2–1	Paris Saint-Germain	Lyon
20:30 CET (UTC+1)	Gava 6'; Patouillard 75'		Fournier 4'	Stadium: Stade de Gerland; Attendance: 12,000; Referee: Jean-Claude Puyalt

=== UEFA Cup Winners' Cup ===
==== First round ====
12 September 1996 First leg	Vaduz (Liechtenstein)	0–4	(France) Paris Saint-Germain	Vaduz, Liechtenstein
17:00 CEST (UTC+2)		Report	Le Guen 12'; Dely Valdés 39'; Leonardo 43'; Allou 72'	Stadium: Gemeindesportplatz; Attendance: 3,900; Referee: Romans Lajuks (Latvia)

26 September 1996 Second leg	Paris Saint-Germain (France)	3–0 (7–0 agg.)	(Liechtenstein) Vaduz	Paris, France
20:45 CEST (UTC+2)	Allou 23'; Roche 40'; Mboma 50'	Report		Stadium: Parc des Princes; Attendance: 15,973; Referee: Bujar Pregja (Albania)

==== Second round ====
17 October 1996 First leg	Galatasaray (Turkey)	4–2	(France) Paris Saint-Germain	Istanbul, Turkey
19:30 CEST (UTC+2)	Şükür 5', 31'; Tugay 12'; Ünsal 52'	Report	Le Guen 16'; Dely Valdés 17'	Stadium: Ali Sami Yen Stadium; Attendance: 23,000; Referee: Pierluigi Collina (Italy)

31 October 1996 Second leg	Paris Saint-Germain (France)	4–0 (6–4 agg.)	(Turkey) Galatasaray	Paris, France
20:45 CEST (UTC+2)	Leonardo 9'; Dely Valdés 23'; Loko 58'; Raí 77'	Report		Stadium: Parc des Princes; Attendance: 34,032; Referee: Karol Ihring (Slovakia)

==== Quarter-finals ====
6 March 1997 First leg	Paris Saint-Germain (France)	0–0	(Greece) AEK Athens	Paris, France
20:30 CEST (UTC+2)		Report		Stadium: Parc des Princes; Attendance: 21,952; Referee: Urs Meier (Switzerland)

20 March 1997 Second leg	AEK Athens (Greece)	0–3 (0–3 agg.)	(France) Paris Saint-Germain	Athens, Greece
20:15 CEST (UTC+2)		Report	Loko 21', 44', 81'	Stadium: Nikos Goumas Stadium; Attendance: 27,200; Referee: Antonio López Nieto (Spain)

==== Semi-finals ====
10 April 1997 First leg	Paris Saint-Germain (France)	3–0	(England) Liverpool	Paris, France
20:45 CEST (UTC+2)	Leonardo 11'; Cauet 43'; Leroy 83'	Report		Stadium: Parc des Princes; Attendance: 35,142; Referee: Hellmut Krug (Germany)

24 April 1997 Second leg	Liverpool (England)	2–0 (2–3 agg.)	(France) Paris Saint-Germain	Liverpool, England
20:30 CEST (UTC+2)	Fowler 12'; Wright 79'	Report		Stadium: Anfield; Attendance: 41,700; Referee: Rune Pedersen (Norway)

==== Final ====
14 May 1997 Final	Barcelona (Spain)	1–0	(France) Paris Saint-Germain	Rotterdam, Netherlands
20:30 CEST (UTC+2)	Ronaldo 38' (pen.)	Report		Stadium: Feijenoord Stadion; Attendance: 36,802; Referee: Markus Merk (Germany)

=== UEFA Super Cup ===
15 January 1997 First leg	Paris Saint-Germain (France)	1–6	(Italy) Juventus	Paris, France
20:30 CET (UTC+1)	Raí 52' (pen.)	Report	Porrini 4'; Padovano 22', 40'; Ferrara 33'; Lombardo 83'; Amoruso 88'	Stadium: Parc des Princes; Attendance: 29,519; Referee: Nikolai Levnikov (Russia)

5 February 1997 Second leg	Juventus (Italy)	3–1 (9–2 agg.)	(France) Paris Saint-Germain	Palermo, Italy
20:45 CET (UTC+1)	Del Piero 36', 70'; Vieri 90+3'	Report	Raí 64' (pen.)	Stadium: Stadio La Favorita; Attendance: 35,100; Referee: Serge Muhmenthaler (Switzerland)
