= 1995 Coupe de France final =

Final of the 1994–95 edition of the Coupe de France

- Event: 1994–95 Coupe de France
Paris Saint-Germain	Strasbourg
1	0
- Date: 13 May 1995
- Venue: Parc des Princes, Paris
- Referee: Philippe Leduc
- Attendance: 46,698

The 1995 Coupe de France final was a football match held at Parc des Princes, Paris on May 13, 1995. Paris SG defeated RC Strasbourg 1-0 on a goal by Paul Le Guen.

== Road to the final ==
Paris Saint-Germain			Round	Strasbourg
Opponent	H/A	Result	1994–95 Coupe de France	Opponent	H/A	Result
Rennes	H	3–1 (a.e.t.)	Round of 64	Louhans-Cuiseaux	A	4–3
Martigues	A	1–0	Round of 32	Lille	A	1–0
Le Havre	A	0–0 (a.e.t.); 4−3 pen.	Round of 16	Saint-Leu	A	3–1
Nancy	A	2–0	Quarter-finals	Bordeaux	A	2–0 (a.e.t.)
Marseille	H	2–0	Semi-finals	Metz	H	1–0

== Match details ==
13 May 1995
20:00

Paris Saint-Germain	1–0	Strasbourg
Le Guen 49'

Parc des Princes, Paris
Attendance: 46,698
Referee: Philippe Leduc

PARIS SG:
GK	1	(France) Bernard Lama
DF	3	(France) José Cobos	(substituted off) 12'
DF	2	(France) Antoine Kombouaré
DF	5	(France) Alain Roche (c)
DF	6	(France) Patrick Colleter
MF	8	(France) Vincent Guérin
MF	7	(France) Daniel Bravo
MF	10	(Brazil) Raí	(substituted off) 90'
MF	4	(France) Paul Le Guen
FW	9	(Liberia) George Weah
FW	11	(France) David Ginola
Substitutes:
DF	14	(France) Francis Llacer	(substituted on) 12'
FW	15	(France) Pascal Nouma	(substituted on) 90'
Manager:
(France) Luis Fernandez Assistant Referees: Fourth Official:

RC STRASBOURG:
GK	1	(Slovakia) Alexander Vencel
DF	2	(France) Pascal Baills
DF	6	(France) Franck Leboeuf
DF	4	(France) David Regis
DF	3	(France) Martin Djetou
MF	11	(France) Yvon Pouliquen (c)
MF	10	(Russia) Aleksandr Mostovoi
MF	8	(France) Rémi Garde	(substituted off) 85'
MF	5	(France) Franck Sauzée
FW	9	(France) Xavier Gravelaine
FW	7	(France) Marc Keller	(substituted off) 73'
Substitutes:
FW	13	(Algeria) Ali Bouafia	(substituted on) 73'
MF	14	(France) Wilfried Gohel	(substituted on) 85'
Manager:
(France) Jacky Duguépéroux

== See also ==
- 1994–95 Coupe de France
