= 1995 Coupe de la Ligue final =

- Event: 1994–95 Coupe de la Ligue
Paris Saint-Germain	Bastia
Division 1	Division 1
2	0
- Date: 3 May 1995
- Venue: Parc des Princes, Paris
- Referee: Marcel Lainé
- Attendance: 24,663

The 1995 Coupe de la Ligue final was a football match held at Parc des Princes, Paris on 3 May 1995, that saw Paris Saint-Germain defeat SC Bastia 2-0 thanks to goals by Alain Roche and Raí.

== Route to the final ==
Note: In all results below, the score of the finalist is given first (H: home. A: away).

Paris Saint-Germain		Round	Bastia	
Opponent	Result	1994–95 Coupe de la Ligue	Opponent	Result
Auxerre (H)	1–0	Second round	Amiens (H)	3–0
Lyon (H)	2–1	Round of 16	Nantes (A)	1–0 (a.e.t.)
Toulouse (H)	3–0	Quarter-finals	Guingamp (H)	1–1 (a.e.t.) (4–3 p)
Le Havre (A)	2–1	Semi-finals	Montpellier (H)	3–1

== Match details ==
3 May 1995
20:30

Paris Saint-Germain	2–0	Bastia
Roche 21'; Raí 84'

Parc des Princes, Paris
Attendance: 24,663
Referee: Marcel Lainé

PARIS SAINT-GERMAIN FC:
GK	1	(France) Luc Borrelli
DF	3	(France) Antoine Kombouaré
DF	4	(Brazil) Ricardo Gomes
DF	5	(France) Alain Roche (c)
DF	2	(France) Francis Llacer
MF	6	(France) Paul Le Guen	(substituted off) 58'
MF	8	(France) Vincent Guérin
MF	7	(France) Bernard Allou
MF	10	(Brazil) Raí
FW	11	(France) David Ginola	(substituted off) 60'
FW	9	(Liberia) George Weah
Substitutes:
GK	12	(France) Bernard Lama
DF	16	(France) Patrick Colleter
DF	14	(France) Oumar Dieng
MF	17	(France) Daniel Bravo	(substituted on) 58'
FW	15	(France) Pascal Nouma	(substituted on) 60'
Manager:
(France) Luis Fernandez Assistant Referees: Fourth Official:

SC BASTIA:
GK	1	(France) Bruno Valencony
DF	2	(France) Jean-Christophe Debu
DF	5	(France) Gilles Leclercq
DF	4	(France) Franck Burnier
DF	3	(France) Didier Santini
MF	6	(France) Laurent Casanova (c)	(substituted off) 17'
MF	8	(Senegal) Mamadou Faye
MF	11	(France) Stéphane Ziani
FW	7	(France) Franck Vandecasteele
FW	10	(France) Bruno Rodriguez	(substituted off) 82'
FW	9	(Federal Republic of Yugoslavia) Anto Drobnjak
Substitutes:
GK	16	(France) André Biancarelli
DF	15	(France) Frédéric Darras
MF	13	(France) Pierre Maroselli
MF	12	(France) Cyril Rool	(substituted on) 17'
MF	14	(France) Pascal Camadini	(substituted on) 82'
Manager:
(France) Frédéric Antonetti

== See also ==
- 1995 Coupe de France final
- 1994–95 SC Bastia season
- 1994–95 Paris Saint-Germain FC season
- 2015 Coupe de la Ligue final - played between same clubs
