= France national football B team =

National association football B team

France B
- Association: French Football Federation (Fédération Française de Football)
- Confederation: UEFA (Europe)
- Home stadium: Stade de France
- FIFA code: FRA
First colours	Second colours

First international
- Denmark 9–0 France (White City, United Kingdom, 19 October 1908)

Biggest win
- France 7–0 Luxembourg (Strasbourg, France, 22 May 1952)

Biggest defeat
- Denmark 9–0 France (White City, United Kingdom, 19 October 1908)

Summer Olympics
- Appearances: 1 (first in 1908)
- Best result: First round (1908)

The France national football B team is a national football team representing France that plays matches at a lower level than the France national football team. In France, the team is usually called "France A–". They commonly played matches against 'B' teams from other football associations, from 1922 to 2001.

The team runs occasionally as a feeder team for France national football team, to give a chance to under-21 or less experienced players to play for the national team without being awarded a full cap. The team may play matches held before World Cups or other tournaments to give second-choice players, injured players or possible choices an opportunity to play a full game to either keep their fitness levels up or to earn their way into the first team.

== History ==
=== Pre-history ===
The France B team was officially created in 1922, however, at the 1908 Summer Olympics, two teams from France participated in the tournament, the main team and a "B" side, but the matches that this team played in London are not recognised by French Football Federation (FFF) as official B team games. France B was eliminated in the first round by Denmark with a score of 9–0, but the main team did no better as Denmark then defeated France A in the semi-finals by a score of 17–1, conceding 10 goals from one player alone, which was a world record at the time. Remarkably, both French teams conceded pokers from Vilhelm Wolfhagen.

=== Early history ===
France B was officially created in 1922 and the team made its debut on 15 January 1922 at the ground of SC Luxembourg in Luxembourg City, where they lost to the Luxembourg A team 3–2, courtesy of a hat-trick from Robert Elter, but France B fought back and achieved some vengeance in their next game when they faced the Luxembourg A team again on 25 February 1923 at Stade Bergeyre in Paris, this time being them the ones to win 3–2.

=== Mediterranean Cup ===
Until 1968 (except for war years), the French B side played at least one match per year, with their most-scheduled year being in 1952 with eight matches against foreign nations A or B, of which France lost only once, a 3–1 defeat at the hands of Saarland. In the following year, France B participated in the 1953–58 Mediterranean Cup, where they faced the A teams of Turkey, Egypt and Greece home and away, as well as the B teams of Italy and Spain, and France started the tournament with three consecutive 0–0 draws before losing 0–2 to Spain B, and their inability to score goals stayed on as they then beat Greece 1–0 only thanks to an own goal, but despite their failure to score a single goal in 5 games, France regained his feet and still managed to finish the tournament in second-place with 12 points, finishing with 4 wins, 4 draws and 2 defeats, with their best victory coming against Egypt (7-1) in Nice on 15 April 1955.

=== Decline ===
After 1968, the use by French coaches of this selection became rarer: between 1971 and 1982, only eight matches took place and then the B side became inactive. It was Michel Platini, the then French coach, who revived this team under the name of France A– on 16 November 1988, which remained unchanged (with the exception of the period between 1990 and 1992, when the team was again called the "France B team") until 2001.

=== Recent history ===
The most recent match of France B was on 5 February 2008 against Congo DR in Marbella, the day before the regular A-team friendly in Málaga. The team line-up was Steve Mandanda (Hugo Lloris 46'); Gaël Clichy, Jean-Alain Boumsong, Philippe Mexès, Bacary Sagna; Jérôme Rothen, Alou Diarra, Samir Nasri (Gaël Givet 76'), Mathieu Flamini (Jérémy Menez 17'), Jimmy Briand; Djibril Cissé; team members Sébastien Squillaci and Abou Diaby were not used.

== Results ==
16 November 1988 Friendly	France B	1–0	(Socialist Federal Republic of Yugoslavia) Yugoslavia B	Auxerre, France
	Micciche 90'	Report		Stadium: Stade de l'Abbé-Deschamps

15 February 1989 Friendly	France B	1–0	Netherlands B	Nimes, France
	Xuereb 17'	Report		Stadium: Stade des Costières

12 January 1993 Friendly	Senegal	1–3	France B	Dakar, Senegal
	Sané 88'	Report	Loko 8', 52'; Prunier 38'	Stadium: Stade Léopold Sédar Senghor

7 June 1993 Friendly	France B	2–0	Venezuela	Pointe-à-Pitre, Guadeloupe
		Report	Dedebant 59 ' Djorkaeff 67'

10 June 1993 Friendly	France B	1–3	Colombia	Fort-de-France, France
	Djorkaeff 46'	Report	Valencia 75', 84', 90'	Stadium: Stade Pierre-Aliker

27 July 1993 Friendly	France B	5–1	Russia U-21	Guingamp, France
	Djorkaeff 15', 29'; Dedebant 49'; Guérin 56' (pen.); Bancarel 73'	Report	Kulik 67'	Stadium: Stade de Roudourou

19 September 1993 Friendly	Monaco FC	1–2	France B	Monaco, France
	Simba 31'	Report	Fournier 57'; Leboeuf 64' (pen.)	Stadium: Stade Louis II

2 February 1994 Friendly	Tunisia	1–1	France B	Tunis, Tunisia
	Mahjoubi 71'	Report	Gnako 4' (pen.)	Stadium: Stade El Menzah

25 May 1994 Friendly	France B	4–1	Francophonie XI	Évry, France
	Zitelli 17'; Baticle 33', 89'; Madar 53'	Report	Camara 42'	Stadium: Ludwigsparkstadion

17 January 1995 Friendly	France B	1–0	Belgium	Le Havre, France
	Gravelaine 7'	Report		Stadium: Stade Jules Deschaseaux

25 May 1995 Friendly	France B	1–0	Slovakia	Cherbourg, France
	Pouget 37'	Report		Stadium: Stade Maurice-Postaire

24 January 1996 Friendly	Italy U-23	0–0	France B	Reggio Calabria, Italy
		Report		Stadium: Comunale
Note: France is a U-23 Selection of 2nd Division

26 March 1996 Friendly	Belgium U-21	1–1	France B	Charleroi, Belgium
	Walem 10'	Report	Rodriguez 90'	Stadium: Stade du Pays de Charleroi

19 January 1999 Friendly	France B	2–0	Croatia B	Nîmes, France
	Laigle 65'; Née 70'	Report		Stadium: Stade des Costières

10 February 1999 Friendly	France B	2–1	Belgium U-21	Angers, France
	Déhu (red card); Vairelles 31' (pen.); Robert 35'	Report	Maertens 52'	Stadium: Stade Raymond Kopa

2 June 1999 Friendly	France B	2–1	Germany B	Lens, France
	Ziani 45'; Monterrubio 86'	Report	Schneider 7'	Stadium: Stade Bollaert-Delelis

1 September 1999 Friendly	Germany B	1–3	France B	Karlsruhe, Germany
	Neuendorf 25' (pen.)	Report	Maurice 41' (pen.), 72'; Monterrubio 59'	Stadium: Wildparkstadion

22 February 2000 Friendly	Belgium U-21	1–1	France B	Waregem, Belgium
	Sonck 8'	Report	Diomède 58'	Stadium: Regenboogstadion

25 April 2000 Friendly	Morocco Olympics	0–1	France B	Casablanca, Morocco
		Report	Sibierski 77'	Stadium: Stade Mohammed V

22 March 2001 Friendly	France B	1–2	Germany B	Mulhouse, France
	Marlet 70' (pen.)	Report	Böhme 33' (pen.); Ricken 45'	Stadium: Stade de l'Ill
