= 1994–95 AS Saint-Étienne season =

AS Saint-Étienne
1994–95 season
- Head coach: Élie Baup
- Stadium: Stade Geoffroy-Guichard
- French Division 1: 18th
- Coupe de France: Round of 64
- Coupe de la Ligue: Round of 32
- Top goalscorer: League: Laurent Blanc (12); All: Laurent Blanc (12)

The 1994–95 season was the 76th in the history of AS Saint-Étienne and their ninth consecutive season in the top flight. The club participated in the French Division 1, the Coupe de France, and the inaugural Coupe de la Ligue.

Despite finishing in 18th place, Saint-Étienne was spared from relegation, following the OM-VA affair which prevented Marseille from being promoted to Division 1.

== Pre-season and friendlies ==
Win Draw Loss Fixtures

11 November 1994 Friendly	Saint-Étienne (France)	0–2	(Portugal) Tirsense
CET (UTC+1)

10 December 1994 Friendly	Saint-Étienne (France)	1–0	(France) Auxerre
CET (UTC+1)

18 February 1995 Friendly	Saint-Étienne (France)	1–0	(South Korea) Ajou Daek
CET (UTC+1)

16 March 1995 Friendly	Valence (France)	2–1	(France) Saint-Étienne
CET (UTC+1)

== Competitions ==
=== Overall record ===
Competition	First match	Last match	Starting round	Final position	Record							
Competition	First match	Last match	Starting round	Final position	Pld	W	D	L	GF	GA	GD	Win %
French Division 1	29 July 1994	31 May 1995	Matchday 1	18th	38	9	11	18	45	55	−10	23.68
Coupe de France	14 January 1995		Round of 64	Round of 64	1	0	0	1	0	2	−2	0.00
Coupe de la Ligue	3 January 1995		Round of 32	Round of 32	1	0	0	1	1	3	−2	0.00
Total					40	9	11	20	46	60	−14	22.50

Source: Competitions

=== French Division 1 ===
==== League table ====
Pos	Team	Pld	W	D	L	GF	GA	GD	Pts	Qualification or relegation
16	Nice	38	11	10	17	39	52	−13	43	
17	Montpellier	38	9	14	15	38	53	−15	41	
18	Saint-Étienne	38	9	11	18	45	55	−10	38	
19	Caen (R)	38	10	6	22	38	58	−20	36	Relegation to French Division 2
20	Sochaux (R)	38	6	5	27	29	68	−39	23	Relegation to French Division 2

Source: Ligue 1
Rules for classification: 1) points; 2) goal difference; 3) number of goals scored.
(R) Relegated

==== Results summary ====
Overall								Home						Away					
Pld	W	D	L	GF	GA	GD	Pts	W	D	L	GF	GA	GD	W	D	L	GF	GA	GD
38	9	11	18	45	55	−10	38	9	6	4	36	20	+16	0	5	14	9	35	−26

Source: Ligue 1

==== Results by round ====
Round	1	2	3	4	5	6	7	8	9	10	11	12	13	14	15	16	17	18	19	20	21	22	23	24	25	26	27	28	29	30	31	32	33	34	35	36	37	38
Ground	H	A	H	H	A	H	A	H	A	H	A	H	A	H	A	H	A	H	A	H	A	A	H	A	H	A	H	A	H	A	H	A	H	A	H	A	H	A
Result	D	D	W	W	L	W	D	W	L	D	L	L	D	W	L	W	L	L	L	W	L	D	W	L	L	L	D	L	D	L	W	L	L	L	D	L	D	D
Position	5	12	6	3	6	3	4	4	5	6	10	11	10	10	10	9	10	10	12	10	12	13	11	13	13	14	14	14	14	16	13	16	17	18	18	18	18	18

Source: Ligue 1
A = Away; H = Home; W = Win; D = Draw; L = Loss

==== Matches ====
29 July 1994 1	Saint-Étienne	1–1	Rennes	Saint-Étienne
--:-- CEST (UTC+2)				Stadium: Stade Geoffroy-Guichard

2 August 1994 2	Martigues	1–1	Saint-Étienne	Martigues
--:-- CEST (UTC+2)				Stadium: Stade Francis Turcan

5 August 1994 3	Saint-Étienne	4–0	Montpellier	Saint-Étienne
--:-- CEST (UTC+2)				Stadium: Stade Geoffroy-Guichard

13 August 1994 4	Saint-Étienne	2–0	Strasbourg	Saint-Étienne
--:-- CEST (UTC+2)				Stadium: Stade Geoffroy-Guichard

20 August 1994 5	Bordeaux	2–1	Saint-Étienne	Bordeaux
--:-- CEST (UTC+2)				Stadium: Stade Chaban-Delmas

27 August 1994 6	Saint-Étienne	4–1	Le Havre	Saint-Étienne
--:-- CEST (UTC+2)				Stadium: Stade Geoffroy-Guichard

31 August 1994 7	Lens	0–0	Saint-Étienne	Lens
--:-- CEST (UTC+2)				Stadium: Stade Bollaert-Delelis

10 September 1994 8	Saint-Étienne	4–0	Sochaux	Saint-Étienne
--:-- CEST (UTC+2)				Stadium: Stade Geoffroy-Guichard

17 September 1994 9	Nantes	3–0	Saint-Étienne	Nantes
--:-- CEST (UTC+2)				Stadium: Stade de la Beaujoire

23 September 1994 10	Saint-Étienne	1–1	Lyon	Saint-Étienne
--:-- CEST (UTC+2)				Stadium: Stade Geoffroy-Guichard

2 October 1994 11	Auxerre	3–0	Saint-Étienne	Auxerre
--:-- CEST (UTC+2)				Stadium: Stade de l'Abbé-Deschamps

11 October 1994 12	Saint-Étienne	1–2	Bastia	Saint-Étienne
--:-- CEST (UTC+2)				Stadium: Stade Geoffroy-Guichard

16 October 1994 13	Monaco	0–0	Saint-Étienne	Monaco
--:-- CEST (UTC+2)				Stadium: Stade Louis II

22 October 1994 14	Saint-Étienne	1–0	Cannes	Saint-Étienne
--:-- CEST (UTC+2)				Stadium: Stade Geoffroy-Guichard

29 October 1994 15	Metz	1–0	Saint-Étienne	Metz
--:-- CEST (UTC+2)				Stadium: Stade Saint-Symphorien

5 November 1994 16	Saint-Étienne	2–0	Caen	Saint-Étienne
--:-- CET (UTC+1)				Stadium: Stade Geoffroy-Guichard

8 November 1994 17	Lille	1–0	Saint-Étienne	Lille
--:-- CET (UTC+1)				Stadium: Stade Grimonprez-Jooris

19 November 1994 18	Saint-Étienne	1–3	Paris Saint-Germain	Saint-Étienne
--:-- CET (UTC+1)				Stadium: Stade Geoffroy-Guichard

26 November 1994 19	Nice	3–0	Saint-Étienne	Nice
--:-- CET (UTC+1)				Stadium: Stade du Ray

1 December 1994 20	Saint-Étienne	3–0	Martigues	Saint-Étienne
--:-- CET (UTC+1)				Stadium: Stade Geoffroy-Guichard

17 December 1994 21	Montpellier	3–2	Saint-Étienne	Montpellier
--:-- CET (UTC+1)				Stadium: Stade de la Mosson

7 January 1995 22	Strasbourg	1–1	Saint-Étienne	Strasbourg
--:-- CET (UTC+1)				Stadium: Stade de la Meinau

21 January 1995 23	Saint-Étienne	2–1	Bordeaux	Saint-Étienne
--:-- CET (UTC+1)				Stadium: Stade Geoffroy-Guichard

15 April 1995 33	Saint-Étienne	0–1	Metz	Saint-Étienne
--:-- CEST (UTC+2)				Stadium: Stade Geoffroy-Guichard

29 April 1995 34	Caen	3–0	Saint-Étienne	Caen
--:-- CEST (UTC+2)				Stadium: Stade Michel d'Ornano

6 May 1995 35	Saint-Étienne	3–3	Lille	Saint-Étienne
--:-- CEST (UTC+2)				Stadium: Stade Geoffroy-Guichard

20 May 1995 36	Paris Saint-Germain	1–0	Saint-Étienne	Paris
--:-- CEST (UTC+2)				Stadium: Parc des Princes

27 May 1995 37	Saint-Étienne	3–3	Nice	Saint-Étienne
--:-- CEST (UTC+2)				Stadium: Stade Geoffroy-Guichard

31 May 1995 38	Rennes	2–2	Saint-Étienne	Rennes
--:-- CEST (UTC+2)				Stadium: Stade de la Route de Lorient

=== Coupe de France ===
14 January 1995 Round of 64	Montpellier	2–0	Saint-Étienne	Montpellier
--:-- CET (UTC+1)				Stadium: Stade de la Mosson; Attendance: 4,000

=== Coupe de la Ligue ===
3 January 1995 Round of 32	Caen	3–1	Saint-Étienne	Caen
20:00 CET (UTC+1)				Stadium: Stade Michel d'Ornano; Attendance: 8,935
