= Vince Hernandez =

Vince or Vincent Hernandez may refer to:

- Vincent Fernandez, French football goalkeeper who currently plays for LB Châteauroux
- Vince Hernandez, comic book writer and Editor-in-Chief at Aspen Comics
