= Jean-Philippe Séchet =

French footballer and manager (born 1965)

Personal information
- Date of birth: 16 July 1965 (age 61)
- Place of birth: La Tronche, France
- Height: 1.86 m (6 ft 1 in)
- Position: Attacking midfielder

Team information
- Current team: US Saint-Flour (manager)

Youth career
- –1983: Échirolles

Senior career*
Years	Team	Apps	(Gls)
1983–1990	Grenoble	144+ (Note: Statistics are missing for the 1986–87 season.)	(14+)
1990–1991	Gueugnon	31	(9)
1991–1992	Nancy	35	(9)
1992–1994	Metz	74	(12)
1994–1995	Paris Saint-Germain	24	(2)
1995–1996	Saint-Étienne	34	(3)
1996–1997	Nancy	21	(1)
1997–2000	FC Saarbrücken		
2000–2001	Sporting Mertzig		
Total		363+	(50+)

Managerial career
- Reims U17
- 2002–2003: RM Hamm Benfica
- 2004–2005: FC Hagondange
- 2005–2006: Audun-le-Tiche
- 2006–2007: FC Toul
- 2008–2012: SR Creutzwald 03
- 2012–2015: Raon-l'Étape
- 2016: Montélimar
- 2021–: US Saint-Flour
- * Club domestic league appearances and goals

Jean-Philippe Séchet (born 16 July 1965) is a French professional football manager and former player who played as an attacking midfielder. As of 2021, he is the manager of Régional 1 club US Saint-Flour.

== Personal life ==
During the 2000s decade, while simultaneously being a football manager, Séchet was the director of a publicity company. He founded the company with an associate and his wife in 2003. He also worked as a commentator on the radio for FC Metz.

== Honours ==
=== Player ===
Paris Saint-Germain

- Coupe de France: 1994–95
- Coupe de la Ligue: 1994–95

=== Manager ===
FC Toul

- Division d'Honneur: 2006–07
