= Kor Sarr =

Senegalese footballer (1975–2019)

Personal information
- Full name: Kor Daba Arfang Sarr
- Date of birth: 13 December 1975
- Place of birth: Pikine, Senegal
- Date of death: 18 February 2019 (aged 43)
- Place of death: Paris, France
- Height: 1.80 m (5 ft 11 in)
- Position: Forward

Senior career*
Years	Team	Apps	(Gls)
1994–1999	Beauvais		
2000	Le Touquet AC		
2000–2002	Angoulême		
2002–2005	Caen	74	(19)
2006–2007	Ouistreham		
Total		74+	(19+)

Managerial career
- 2010–2011: AS Pikine
- 2011–2012: RS Yoff
- * Club domestic league appearances and goals

Kor Daba Arfang Sarr (13 December 1975 – 18 February 2019) was a Senegalese professional football player and manager who played as a forward.

== Career ==
Born in Pikine, Sarr began his career in France with Beauvais, where he played from 1994 to 1999. In January 2000 he moved to Le Touquet AC, which was struggling in Championnat de France Amateur 2 (CFA2), where he scored a number of goals. He signed with Angoulême in summer 2000 and became top scorer of the 2001–02 Championnat National before joining Ligue 2 club Caen. He played for Caen from 2002 to 2005, scoring 20 goals in 80 appearances. He was a key player in the 2002–03 and 2003–04 seasons, scoring nine goals in 30 and 33 appearances respectively, and helped Caen achieve promotion to Ligue 1. In the 2004–05 Ligue 1 he scored one goal in eleven appearances and injury problems made him end his professional career. He briefly returned to playing with Ouistreham, appearing in the CFA2 for one season.

After retiring as a player, Sarr managed Senegalese clubs AS Pikine and RS Yoff. As manager of ASC Jaraaf, he won the Senegal FA Cup.

== Later life and death ==
After retirement from playing, Sarr returned to Senegal and opened a training centre in his hometown Pikine, called "Malherbe Pikine".

He died on 18 February 2019 in Paris at the age of 43.
