= Bernard Allou =

French-Ivorian footballer (born 1975)

Personal information
- Full name: Anoh Bernard Allou
- Date of birth: 19 June 1975 (age 51)
- Place of birth: Cocody, Ivory Coast
- Height: 1.73 m (5 ft 8 in)
- Position: Winger

Youth career
- Paris Saint-Germain

Senior career*
Years	Team	Apps	(Gls)
1994–1998	Paris Saint-Germain	41	(3)
1998	Nagoya Grampus Eight	10	(4)
1999–2001	Nottingham Forest	6	(1)
2001–2002	R.W.D. Molenbeek	23	(5)
2002–2004	White Star Woluwé		
2004–2006	Uccle Leo Forestoise		
2006–2008	White Star Woluwé		

International career
- France U20
- France U21
- * Club domestic league appearances and goals

Anoh Bernard Allou (born 19 June 1975) is a former professional footballer who played as a winger. He most notably played for Paris Saint-Germain, Nagoya Grampus Eight and Nottingham Forest. The highlight of this time at PSG was playing as they won the 1995 Coupe de la Ligue Final against Bastia. Born in Ivory Coast, he represented France at youth level.

== Club career ==
Allou was born in Cocody, Ivory Coast.

In 1997, he had a trial at Newcastle United but it did not lead to a contract. In March 1999, Allou signed for Nottingham Forest and went on to make two appearances in the remainder of that season, as Forest were relegated from the Premier League. The following season, he scored two goals for Forest; one against Mansfield Town in the League Cup and one against Wolverhampton Wanderers in the league.

== International career ==
Allou played for the France under-21 team between 1994 and 1997 and the France under-20 team at the 1996 Toulon Tournament.

== Career statistics ==
Appearances and goals by club, season and competition
Club	Season	League			National cup		League cup		Continental		Other		Total	
Club	Season	Division	Apps	Goals	Apps	Goals	Apps	Goals	Apps	Goals	Apps	Goals	Apps	Goals
Paris Saint-Germain	1998–99	Division 1	7	3	2	0	0	0	1	0	–		10	3
Paris Saint-Germain	1995–96	Division 1	19	0	1	0	1	0	3	0	–		24	0
Paris Saint-Germain	1996–97	Division 1	12	0	1	0	1	0	4	2	1 (Note: Appearance in UEFA Super Cup)	0	19	2
Paris Saint-Germain	1997–98	Division 1	3	0	0	0	0	0	0	0	–		3	0
Paris Saint-Germain	Total		41	3	4	0	2	0	8	2	1	0	56	5
Nagoya Grampus Eight	1998	J1 League	10	4	0	0	3	0	–		–		13	4
Nottingham Forest	1998–99	Premier League	2	0	0	0	0	0	–		–		2	0
Nottingham Forest	1999–2000	First Division	4	1	0	0	4	1	–		–		8	2
Nottingham Forest	Total		6	1	0	0	4	1	0	0	0	0	10	2
R.W.D. Molenbeek	2001–02	Belgian First Division	23	5			–		–		–		23	5
Career total			80	13	4	0	9	1	8	2	1	0	102	16
