= Vincent Cobos =

French footballer (born 1965)

Personal information
- Date of birth: 4 March 1965 (age 61)
- Place of birth: Strasbourg, France
- Height: 1.76 m (5 ft 9 in)
- Position: Centre back

Youth career
- Strasbourg

Senior career*
Years	Team	Apps	(Gls)
1982–1991	Strasbourg	204	(3)
1991–1993	Épinal	40	(1)
Total		244	(4)
- * Club domestic league appearances and goals

Vincent Cobos (born 4 March 1965) is a French former professional footballer who played as a central defender.

== Career ==
Cobos was born in Strasbourg. For nine seasons, he played professionally with hometown's RC Strasbourg, including two as captain, and helped his team achieve promotion to Ligue 1 in 1987–88 as champions.

Cobos retired from the game at only 28, after two years with lowly SAS Épinal. He appeared in 235 games all competitions comprised with his main club.

== Personal life and later life ==
Cobos' younger brother, José, was also a footballer and a defender. He too played for Strasbourg, and the siblings shared teams from 1988 to 1991.

After retiring, Cobos worked with Canal+'s show Foot+.
