= Christophe Desbouillons =

French footballer (born 1958)

Personal information
- Date of birth: 20 August 1958 (age 68)
- Place of birth: Caen, France
- Position: Defender

Senior career*
| Years | Team | Apps | (Gls) |
| 1970–1976 | SM Caen | | |
| 1976–1981 | Olympique Lyonnais | | |
| 1981–1985 | FC Rouen | | |
| 1985–1987 | Angers SCO | | |
| 1987–1988 | CS Meaux | | |
| 1988–1990 | ES La Rochelle | | |

International career
| 1977 | France U-21 MNT | | |

Managerial career
- 1988–1990: ES La Rochelle
- 1990–1994: Angers SCO
- 1994–1998: ES Viry-Châtillon
- 1998–2002: SM Caen
- 2004–2006: FC Bourg-Péronnas
- 2007–2010: AJS Ouistreham
- * Club domestic league appearances and goals

Christophe Desbouillons (born 20 August 1958) is a former professional footballer.

The defender, weighing 80 kg and 1m83, was picked by France U21s and took part in the 1977 FIFA World Youth Championship.

== Career ==
=== Player ===
- 1970-1976 : SM Caen
- 1976-1981 : Olympique lyonnais
- 1981-1985 : FC Rouen
- 1985-1987 : SCO Angers
- 1987-1988 : CS Meaux

=== Player-manager ===
- 1988-1990 : ES La Rochelle (CFA)

=== Manager ===
- 1990-1994 : SCO Angers (centre de formation)
- 1994-1998 : ES Viry-Châtillon (CFA)
- 1998-2002 : SM Caen (Ligue 2) (Joint, in charge for two matches from 2000 to 2001)
- 2004-2006 : FC Bourg-Péronnas (CFA)
- 2007-2010 : AJS Ouistreham (CFA2)
