= Raí =

Brazilian former footballer

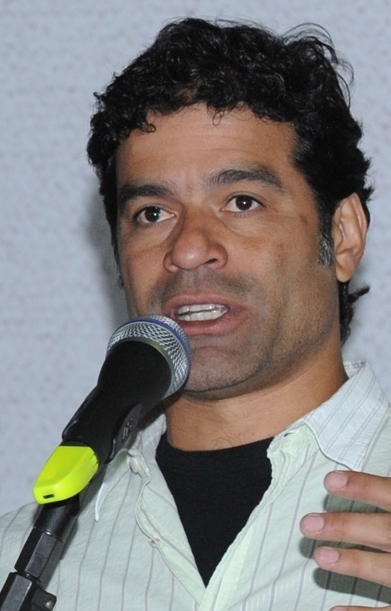
- Raí in 2009

Personal information
- Full name: Raí Souza Vieira de Oliveira
- Date of birth: 15 May 1965 (age 61)
- Place of birth: Ribeirão Preto, Brazil
- Height: 1.89 m (6 ft 2 in)
- Position: Attacking midfielder

Youth career
- 1980–1985: Botafogo-SP

Senior career*
Years	Team	Apps	(Gls)
1984–1987	Botafogo-SP		
1986	→ Ponte Preta (loan)	10	(1)
1987–1993	São Paulo	110	(25)
1993–1998	Paris Saint-Germain	147	(51)
1998–2000	São Paulo	19	(1)

International career
1987–1998	Brazil	49	(17)
Medal record
Men's football
Representing Brazil
FIFA World Cup
Winner	1994 United States
Copa América
Runner-up	1991 Chile
- * Club domestic league appearances and goals

Raí Souza Vieira de Oliveira (born 15 May 1965), known mononymously as Raí (Portuguese pronunciation: [ʁaˈi]), is a Brazilian former professional footballer who played as an attacking midfielder. The younger brother of former Brazil captain Sócrates, Raí also captained the Brazil national team and was part of the squad that won the 1994 FIFA World Cup.

He spent most of his 15-year career with São Paulo and Paris Saint-Germain, winning 10 major titles and scoring nearly 100 goals across the two clubs. Raí is widely regarded as one of the greatest players in Paris Saint-Germain's history.

== Club career ==
=== Early years ===
Born into a middle-class family in Ribeirão Preto, São Paulo, Raí played street football and basketball during his youth. At the age of 15, he began pursuing football seriously and joined local club Botafogo after a friend encouraged him to attend a trial. He made his official debut in 1984 and, following a series of promising performances, signed for Série A club Ponte Preta two years later. However, injuries and a loss of form led to his return to Botafogo, where he revived his career under Uruguayan coach Pedro Rocha. His performances subsequently earned him a call-up to the Brazil national team and attracted interest from several clubs.

=== São Paulo ===
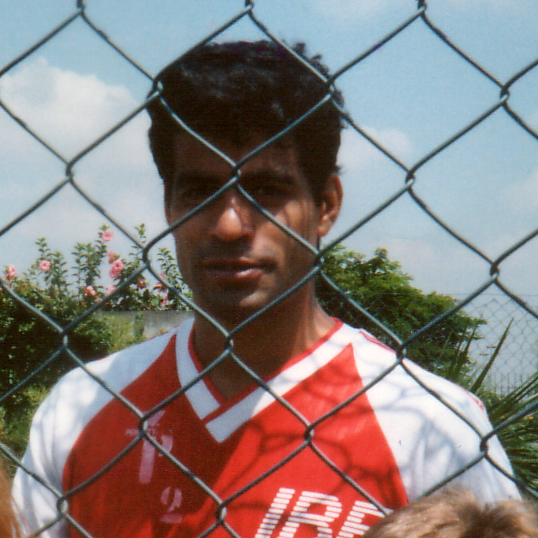
Raí in 1993

Raí joined São Paulo for the 1987 season, only making his league debut on 18 October due to injury. After scoring only once in his first year, Raí developed into a prolific goalscorer under coach Telê Santana, scoring 29 goals in the 1991 campaign as the team won both the regional Campeonato Paulista and the National Championship.

In 1992, Raí helped São Paulo win the club's first Copa Libertadores, scoring the only goal of the second leg of the final against Newell's Old Boys to force a penalty shootout. Later that year, he scored both goals in São Paulo's 2–1 victory over Barcelona in the 1992 Intercontinental Cup in Tokyo. The performance capped an outstanding year for Raí, whose goalscoring exploits had earned him the nickname o Terror do Morumbi ("the Terror of Morumbi"), and he was subsequently named South American Footballer of the Year.

In the 1993 season, São Paulo defended their Copa Libertadores title, with Raí again scoring in the final as CD Universidad Católica were beaten 5–1 at the Estádio do Morumbi.

=== Paris Saint-Germain ===
In June 1993, Raí was acquired by Paris Saint-Germain of France for US$4.6 million, remaining with São Paulo until the end of the year. He still managed to contribute with six goals in 28 Ligue 1 games as his new club won the national championship for the second time in its history; he helped PSG to the following season's French Cup, and was on target in the League Cup final against SC Bastia (2–0). He also reached the semi-finals of the 1994–95 UEFA Champions League with PSG.

Raí once again proved essential as PSG won the 1996 UEFA Cup Winners' Cup, scoring twice in a 3–1 home win against Parma, after a 1–0 away loss. He also appeared in the final against SK Rapid Wien, and went on to score three seasons in double digits during his five-season spell. In 1997–98 he scored in both the Coupe de la Ligue final and the Coupe de France final against Bordeaux and Lens respectively as PSG won both games.

=== Return to São Paulo ===
In May 1998, shortly before his 33rd birthday, Raí returned to São Paulo after five seasons with Paris Saint-Germain. Negotiations for his return had begun in December 1997, and he was released from the remainder of his contract in time to be registered for the second leg of the 1998 Campeonato Paulista final against Corinthians. Having trained only briefly with his new teammates, he started the match on 10 May and headed the opening goal as São Paulo overturned a 2–1 first-leg defeat with a 3–1 victory to win the state championship.

On 9 August 1998, Raí ruptured the cruciate ligaments in his left knee following a challenge during a league match against Cruzeiro, requiring surgery and an extended period of rehabilitation. He later returned to the team and added another Campeonato Paulista title in 2000. In July of that year, he announced that he would retire following the Copa dos Campeões. His final professional appearance came on 22 July in a 3–1 defeat to Sport. Across his two spells with São Paulo, he made 395 appearances, scored 128 goals and won nine trophies.

== International career ==
Raí entered the 1994 FIFA World Cup as Brazil's captain and number 10, and was described in the British press as the team's "poster boy" before the tournament. He was selected by coach Carlos Alberto Parreira for the squad and captained the Seleção during the group stage, scoring a penalty in the opening match, a 2–0 win against Russia, after Romário was brought down in the box. Raí subsequently lost his place in the starting line-up ahead of the knockout stage, with Dunga taking over the captaincy. He appeared as a substitute against the Netherlands in the quarter-finals and Sweden in the semi-finals, as Brazil went on to win the tournament.

== Style of play ==
Raí often advanced from midfield to finish attacking moves and posing a particular danger from set pieces. His blend of technique and physical presence enabled him to influence matches both as a creator and as a scorer.

Early in his career, Raí was criticised for his languid style of play and inconsistent work rate. Under Telê Santana at São Paulo, however, he developed greater tactical discipline and became a more complete midfielder. He later established himself as the central playmaker at Paris Saint-Germain, where he dictated his team's attacking play from midfield. His footballing intelligence, composure and leadership were also regarded as important aspects of his game.

== Post-playing career ==
In the early 2000s, Raí made a cameo appearance as himself in the TV Globo telenovela Laços de Família, in a scene in which he meets the character Ciça Soriano, played by Júlia Feldens, on a flight to New York City.

Raí also became active in social advocacy and football administration. In December 1998, he co-founded the Fundação Gol de Letra with former teammate Leonardo, providing educational, sporting, cultural and vocational programmes for young people in disadvantaged communities in São Paulo and Rio de Janeiro. In 2006, he helped establish Atletas pela Cidadania, later renamed Atletas pelo Brasil, which campaigns for access to sport and improved public sports policy.

On 7 December 2017, Raí returned to São Paulo as the club's executive director of football, assuming responsibility for its football department and sporting planning. He remained in the position for just over three years. In February 2021, following the dismissal of head coach Fernando Diniz, Raí resigned before the scheduled end of his contract.

In July 2022, Raí became a shareholder and ambassador of Paris FC, contributing to the club's institutional development while not being involved in its day-to-day sporting operations. In 2024, he completed an Executive Master in Public Policy Management at Sciences Po, which he undertook in connection with his social and educational work through the Gol de Letra Foundation.

== Personal life ==
Raí is the youngest of six sons and the younger brother of former Brazil captain Sócrates. Their father, an avid reader with an interest in classical philosophy, named his three eldest sons Sócrates, Sóstenes and Sófocles. Raí's name was derived from the first syllable of his father's name, Raimundo.

== Career statistics ==
=== Club ===
Appearances and goals by club, season and competition
Club	Season	League			Coupe de France		Coupe de la Ligue		Europe		Other		Total	
Club	Season	Division	Apps	Goals	Apps	Goals	Apps	Goals	Apps	Goals	Apps	Goals	Apps	Goals
Paris Saint-Germain	1993–94	Division 1	28	6	4	2	—		4 (Note: Appearances in UEFA Cup Winners' Cup)	0	—		36	8
Paris Saint-Germain	1994–95	Division 1	28	12	5	0	4	2	7 (Note: Appearances in UEFA Champions League)	2	—		44	16
Paris Saint-Germain	1995–96	Division 1	27	14	3	1	1	0	6	2	1 (Note: Appearance in Trophée des Champions)	0	38	17
Paris Saint-Germain	1996–97	Division 1	35	9	3	1	1	0	10	3	2 (Note: Appearances in UEFA Super Cup)	2	51	15
Paris Saint-Germain	1997–98	Division 1	29	10	6	3	5	1	8	4	—		48	18
Total			147	51	21	7	11	3	35	11	3	2	217	74

=== International ===
Appearances and goals by national team and year
National team	Year	Apps	Goals
Brazil	1987	11	3
Brazil	1988	0	0
Brazil	1989	0	0
Brazil	1990	0	0
Brazil	1991	5	3
Brazil	1992	7	6
Brazil	1993	16	2
Brazil	1994	9	3
Brazil	1995	0	0
Brazil	1996	0	0
Brazil	1997	0	0
Brazil	1998	1	0
Total		49	17

== Honours ==
São Paulo

- Campeonato Brasileiro Série A: 1991
- Campeonato Paulista: 1987, 1989, 1991, 1992, 1998, 2000
- Copa Libertadores: 1992, 1993
- Intercontinental Cup: 1992

Paris Saint-Germain

- Division 1: 1993–94
- Coupe de France: 1994–95, 1997–98
- Coupe de la Ligue: 1994–95, 1997–98
- Trophée des Champions: 1995
- UEFA Cup Winners' Cup: 1995–96; runner-up 1996–97

Brazil

- FIFA World Cup: 1994
- Copa América runner-up: 1991

Individual

- Bola de Prata: 1989
- Intercontinental Cup Most Valuable Player of the Match Award: 1992
- South American Footballer of the Year: 1992
- South American Team of the Year: 1992
- IFFHS World's Best International Goal Scorer: 1992
- French Division 1 Foreign Player of the Year: 1995, 1997
- ESM Team of the Year: 1995–96
- Laureus Sport for Good Award: 2012

Orders and special awards

- Chevalier of the Légion d'honneur: 2013
- Honorary degree of the Paris Nanterre University: 2019

== See also ==
- List of Paris Saint-Germain FC players
