= Patrick Mboma =

Cameroonian footballer (born 1970)

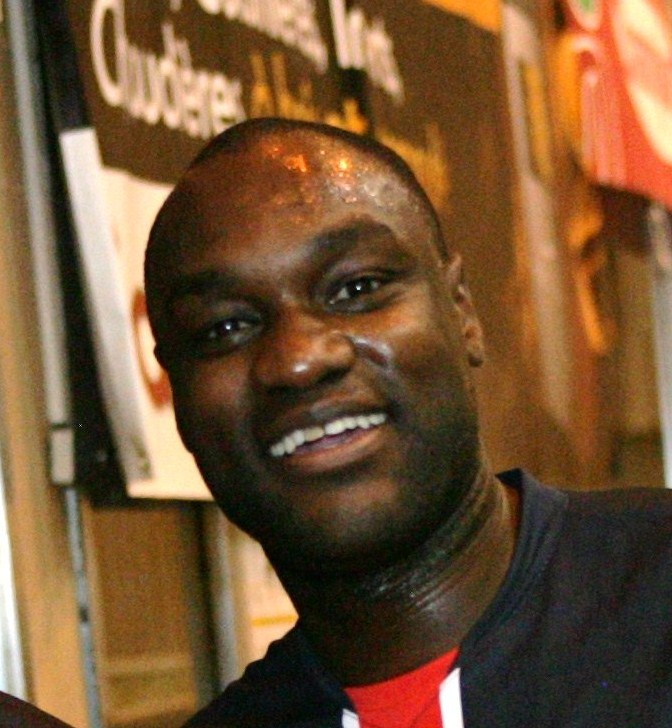
- Mboma in 2008

Personal information
- Full name: Henri Patrick Mboma Dem
- Date of birth: 15 November 1970 (age 55)
- Place of birth: Douala, Cameroon
- Height: 1.85 m (6 ft 1 in)
- Position: Striker

Youth career
- –1990: Stade de l'Est Pavillonnais
- 1990–1992: Paris Saint-Germain

Senior career*
Years	Team	Apps	(Gls)
1992–1997	Paris Saint-Germain	16	(2)
1992–1994	→ Châteauroux (loan)	48	(22)
1995–1996	→ Metz (loan)	17	(4)
1997–1998	Gamba Osaka	34	(29)
1998–2000	Cagliari	40	(15)
2000–2001	Parma	24	(5)
2002	→ Sunderland (loan)	9	(1)
2002–2003	Al-Ittihad	28	(12)
2003–2004	Tokyo Verdy	35	(17)
2004–2005	Vissel Kobe	10	(2)
Total		261	(109)

International career
2000	Cameroon Olympic (O.P.)	6	(4)
1995–2004	Cameroon	57	(33)
Medal record
Representing Cameroon
Africa Cup of Nations
Winner	2000 Ghana-Nigeria
Winner	2002 Mali
Olympics
Gold medal – first place	2000 Sydney
- * Club domestic league appearances and goals

Henri Patrick Mboma Dem (born 15 November 1970) is a Cameroonian former professional footballer who played as a striker. He is the fourth all-time top goal-scorer for the Cameroon national team.

== Club career ==
Born in Douala, Cameroon, Mboma played for Châteauroux, Paris Saint-Germain, Metz, Gamba Osaka, Cagliari, Parma, Sunderland (where he scored once against Tottenham Hotspur), Al-Ittihad, Tokyo Verdy and Vissel Kobe before retiring on 16 May 2005.

== International career ==
After first being capped for Cameroon in 1995, Mboma scored 33 goals in 57 matches. He played in the 1998 and 2002 World Cups, and also led Cameroon to the gold medal at the 2000 Olympics and victories at the 2000 and 2002 African Nations Cups. He was named African Footballer of the Year for his efforts in 2000. He scored a memorable overhead kick against France in 2000.

== Career statistics ==
=== Club ===
Appearances and goals by club, season and competition
Club	Season	League			National cup		League cup		Continental		Total	
Club	Season	Division	Apps	Goals	Apps	Goals	Apps	Goals	Apps	Goals	Apps	Goals
Paris Saint-Germain	1990–91	Division 1	0	0								
Paris Saint-Germain	1991–92	Division 1	0	0								
Paris Saint-Germain	1994–95	Division 1	8	1	1	0	2	1	1	2	12	4
Paris Saint-Germain	1996–97	Division 1	8	1					3	1	11	2
Paris Saint-Germain	Total		16	2	1	0	2	1	4	3	23	6
Châteauroux	1992–93	Division 2	19	5							19	5
Châteauroux	1993–94	Championnat National	29	17							29	17
Châteauroux	Total		48	22							48	22
Metz	1995–96	Division 1	17	4			4	2	5	0	26	6
Gamba Osaka	1997	J1 League	28	25	1	0	5	4	–		34	29
Gamba Osaka	1998	J1 League	6	4	0	0	0	0	–		6	4
Gamba Osaka	Total		34	29	1	0	5	4	0	0	40	33
Cagliari	1998–99	Serie A	13	7	3	1	–		–		16	8
Cagliari	1999–00	Serie A	27	8	4	6	–		–		31	14
Cagliari	Total		40	15	7	7	0	0	0	0	47	22
Parma	2000–01	Serie A	20	5	4	0	–		3	1	27	6
Parma	2001–02	Serie A	4	0	2	0	–		2	1	8	1
Parma	Total		24	5	6	0	0	0	5	2	35	7
Sunderland (loan)	2001–02	Premier League	9	1	–		–		–		9	1
Al-Ittihad	2002–03	Libyan Premier League	28	12							28	12
Tokyo Verdy	2003	J1 League	23	13	3	0	3	3	–		29	16
Tokyo Verdy	2004	J1 League	12	4	0	0	5	4	–		17	8
Tokyo Verdy	Total		35	17	3	0	8	7	0	0	46	24
Vissel Kobe	2004	J1 League	6	2	0	0	0	0	–		6	2
Vissel Kobe	2005	J1 League	4	0	0	0	0	0	–		4	0
Vissel Kobe	Total		10	2	0	0	0	0	0	0	10	2
Career total			261	109	18	7	19	14	14	5	312	135

=== International ===
Appearances and goals by national team and year
National team	Year	Apps	Goals
Cameroon	1995	1	0
Cameroon	1996	1	1
Cameroon	1997	10	6
Cameroon	1998	8	1
Cameroon	1999	4	3
Cameroon	2000	9	9
Cameroon	2001	9	4
Cameroon	2002	10	5
Cameroon	2003	1	0
Cameroon	2004	4	4
Total		57	33
Cameroon Olympic	2000	6	4
Total		6	4

Scores and results list Cameroon and Cameroon Olympic goal tally first. The score column indicates the score after each M'Boma goal.

List of international goals scored by Patrick M'Boma
Cameroon goals
No.	Date	Venue	Opponent	Score	Result	Competition	Ref.
1	10 November 1996	Stade Municipal, Lomé, Togo	Togo	3–1	4–2	1998 FIFA World Cup qualification	
2	26 January 1997	Stade Omnisports, Yaoundé, Cameroon	Namibia	1–0	4–0	1998 African Cup of Nations qualification	
3	26 January 1997	Stade Omnisports, Yaoundé, Cameroon	Namibia	4–0	4–0	1998 African Cup of Nations qualification	
4	27 April 1997	Stade Omnisports, Yaoundé, Cameroon	Togo	2–0	2–0	1998 FIFA World Cup qualification	
5	8 June 1997	Estádio 11 de Novembro, Talatona, Angola	Angola	1–0	1–1	1998 FIFA World Cup qualification	
6	17 August 1997	National Sports Stadium, Harare, Zimbabwe	Zimbabwe	1–0	2–1	1998 FIFA World Cup qualification	
7	17 August 1997	National Sports Stadium, Harare, Zimbabwe	Zimbabwe	2–0	2–1	1998 FIFA World Cup qualification	
8	23 June 1998	Stade de la Beaujoire, Nantes, France	Chile	1–1	1–1	1998 FIFA World Cup	
9	28 February 1999	Stade Omnisports, Yaoundé, Cameroon	Mozambique	1–0	1–0	2000 African Cup of Nations qualification	
10	11 April 1999	Estádio da Machava, Maputo, Mozambique	Mozambique	3–0	6–1	2000 African Cup of Nations qualification	
11	11 April 1999	Estádio da Machava, Maputo, Mozambique	Mozambique	4–0	6–1	2000 African Cup of Nations qualification	
12	28 January 2000	Accra Sports Stadium, Accra, Ghana	Ivory Coast	3–0	3–0	2000 African Cup of Nations	
13	10 February 2000	Accra Sports Stadium, Accra, Ghana	Tunisia	1–0	3–0	2000 African Cup of Nations	
14	10 February 2000	Accra Sports Stadium, Accra, Ghana	Tunisia	3–0	3–0	2000 African Cup of Nations	
15	13 February 2000	National Stadium, Lagos, Nigeria	Nigeria	2–0	2–2	2000 Africa Cup of Nations final	
16	19 April 2000	Stade Omnisports, Yaoundé, Cameroon	Somalia	1–0	3–0	2002 FIFA World Cup qualification	
17	18 June 2000	June 11 Stadium, Tripoli, Libya	Libya	1–0	3–0	2002 FIFA World Cup qualification	
18	18 June 2000	June 11 Stadium, Tripoli, Libya	Libya	2–0	3–0	2002 FIFA World Cup qualification	
19	18 June 2000	June 11 Stadium, Tripoli, Libya	Libya	3–0	3–0	2002 FIFA World Cup qualification	
20	4 October 2000	Stade de France, Paris, France	France	1–1	1–1	Friendly	
21	25 January 2001	Stade de l'Amitié, Cotonou, Benin	Benin	1–0	3–1	Friendly	
22	28 January 2001	Stade de Kégué, Lomé, Togo	Togo	2–0	2–0	2002 FIFA World Cup qualification	
23	25 February 2001	Stade Omnisports, Yaoundé, Cameroon	Zambia	1–0	1–0	2002 FIFA World Cup qualification	
24	4 June 2001	Niigata Stadium, Niigata, Japan	Canada	2–0	2–0	2001 FIFA Confederations Cup	
25	7 January 2002	Stade du 4 Août, Ouagadougou, Burkina Faso	Burkina Faso	2–0	3–1	Friendly	
26	20 January 2002	Stade Babemba Traoré, Sikasso, Mali	DR Congo	1–0	1–0	2002 African Cup of Nations	
27	25 January 2002	Stade Babemba Traoré, Sikasso, Mali	Ivory Coast	1–0	1–0	2002 African Cup of Nations	
28	4 February 2002	Stade Malien de Sikasso, Sikasso, Mali	Egypt	1–0	1–0	2002 African Cup of Nations	
29	1 June 2002	Niigata Stadium, Niigata, Japan	Republic of Ireland	1–0	1–1	2002 FIFA World Cup	
30	25 January 2004	Stade Olympique de Sousse, Sousse, Tunisia	Algeria	1–0	1–1	2004 African Cup of Nations	
31	29 January 2004	Taieb Mhiri Stadium, Sfax, Tunisia	Zimbabwe	1–1	5–3	2004 African Cup of Nations	
32	29 January 2004	Taieb Mhiri Stadium, Sfax, Tunisia	Zimbabwe	3–1	5–3	2004 African Cup of Nations	
33	29 January 2004	Taieb Mhiri Stadium, Sfax, Tunisia	Zimbabwe	4–2	5–3	2004 African Cup of Nations	
Cameroon Olympic team goals
No.	Date	Venue	Opponent	Score	Result	Competition	Ref.
1	13 September 2000	Brisbane Cricket Ground, Brisbane, Australia	Kuwait	2–1	3–2	2000 Summer Olympics	
2	16 September 2000	Bruce Stadium, Canberra, Australia	United States	1–0	1–1	2000 Summer Olympics	
3	23 September 2000	Brisbane Cricket Ground, Brisbane, Australia	Brazil	1–0	2–1	2000 Summer Olympics	
4	26 September 2000	Melbourne Cricket Ground, Melbourne, Australia	Chile	1–1	2–1	2000 Summer Olympics	

== Honours ==
Paris Saint-Germain

- Coupe de France: 1994–95
- Coupe de la Ligue: 1994–95

Metz

- Coupe de la Ligue: 1995–96

Parma

- Coppa Italia: 2001–02

Cameroon

- African Cup of Nations: 2000, 2002

Cameroon U-23

- Olympic Gold Medal: 2000

Individual

- African Footballer of the Year: 2000
- BBC African Footballer of the Year: 2000
- African Nations Cup top scorer: 2002
- J.League Top Scorer: 1997
- J.League Best XI: 1997
- Coppa Italia top scorer: 1999–2000

== Personal life ==
He announced his conversion to Islam in a mosque in Douala in May 2022 acquiring the name Abdul Jalil Mboma.
