= AJS Colleville-Ouistreham =

- Full name: Association des jeunesses sportives de Colleville et Ouistreham (AJSCO)
- Founded: 1936
- Ground: Stade Philippe Kieffer
- Chairman: Dominique Penneras and Alain Robert
- Manager: Dylan Orange
- League: Régional 3
Home colours

AJS Colleville-Ouistreham is a French football club based in Ouistreham. They are currently playing at the Régional 3 level.

== History ==
The club was founded as AJS Ouistreham in 1936 as a merger of two clubs l'Association Sportive Ouistreham and la Jeunesse Sportive Ouistreham. The club spent 70 seasons in the departmental and regional leagues, until the end of the 2005-06 season when they finished second in the Division d'honneur Basse Normandie league and won promotion to the 5th tier of the French football league system. They only spent one season in the CFA2 before being relegated back to the Regional leagues, where they have remained since.

In 2020 the club merged with JS Colleville to form AJS Colleville-Ouistreham.

== Ground ==
The club play their home games at the Stade Philippe Kieffer.

The stadium is named after Philippe Kieffer a French naval officer and the founder and commander of the Free French Commandos during the Second World War. He was Best known for leading the 177 French commandos who landed on the nearby Sword Beach on D-Day.

== Notable players ==
- (France) Stéphane Dedebant
- (Senegal) Kor Sarr

== Notable Managers ==
- (France) Christophe Desbouillons
