= Jean-Marie Stephanopoli =

French footballer (born 1972)

Personal information
- Date of birth: 27 August 1972 (age 54)
- Place of birth: Montreuil, Seine-Saint-Denis, France
- Height: 1.83 m (6 ft 0 in)
- Position: Defender

Senior career*
Years	Team	Apps	(Gls)
1990-1994	Paris Saint-Germain B	0	(0)
1994–1995	Red Star	1	(0)
1996–1997	Lille	1	(0)
1997–2001	Laval	129	(3)
2001–2004	Amiens	85	(0)
2004–2006	Reims	30	(1)
Total		246	(4)
- * Club domestic league appearances and goals

Jean-Marie Stephanopoli (born 27 August 1972) is a French former professional footballer who played as a defender.
