= Luc Borrelli =

French footballer (1965-1999)

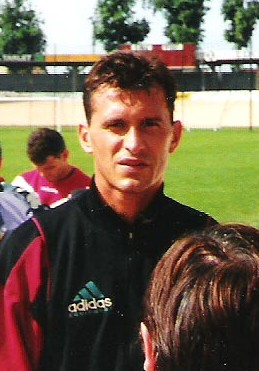
- Borrelli in 1996

Personal information
- Date of birth: 2 July 1965
- Place of birth: Marseille, France
- Date of death: 3 February 1999 (aged 33)
- Place of death: Molphey, France
- Height: 6 ft 0 in (1.83 m)
- Position: Goalkeeper

Senior career*
Years	Team	Apps	(Gls)
1978–1986	ASPTT Marseille		
1986–1993	Toulon	143	(0)
1993–1995	Paris Saint Germain	4	(0)
1995–1998	Caen	89	(0)
1998–1999	Lyon		
- * Club domestic league appearances and goals

Luc Borrelli (2 July 1965 – 3 February 1999) was a French professional footballer who played as a goalkeeper.

== Career ==
Borrelli was born in Marseille and began his career with ASPTT Marseille. In 1986, he moved to Toulon, where he played almost 150 times. In 1993 Borrelli joined Paris Saint Germain, but played just four times in two seasons, leaving for Stade Malherbe Caen in 1995. The highlight of this time at PSG was playing as they won the 1995 Coupe de la Ligue Final against SC Bastia.

== Death ==
On February 3, 1999, Borrelli was killed in a car accident in Molphey on Route nationale 6. Borrelli's vehicle was struck by a truck, resulting in a fiery accident that severely charred his body. Borrelli's death prompted an outpouring of support and tributes amongst the French footballing world.

Borrelli's funeral took place at the church of Notre-Dame-des-Neiges in Bonneveine, Marseille. He was then buried at the Cimetière Saint-Pierre.
