= Pascal Nouma =

French footballer (born 1972)

Personal information
- Full name: Pascal Olivier Nouma
- Date of birth: 6 January 1972 (age 54)
- Place of birth: Épinay-sur-Seine, Seine-Saint-Denis, France
- Height: 1.86 m (6 ft 1 in)
- Positions: Midfielder; striker

Senior career*
Years	Team	Apps	(Gls)
1989–1992	Paris Saint-Germain	19	(0)
1992–1993	Lille	22	(2)
1993–1994	Caen	32	(7)
1994–1996	Paris Saint-Germain	51	(10)
1996–1998	Strasbourg	57	(22)
1998–2000	Lens	46	(16)
2000–2001	Beşiktaş	24	(18)
2001–2002	Marseille	11	(1)
2002–2003	Beşiktaş	19	(4)
2003–2004	Al Khor	3	(0)
2004–2005	Livingston	2	(0)
Total		286	(80)
- * Club domestic league appearances and goals

Pascal Olivier Nouma (born 6 January 1972) is a French former professional footballer who played as a midfielder or striker.

== Career ==
Nouma started his career in the Paris Saint-Germain youth team before moving around other teams in France. He played for Lille and Caen before moving back to PSG for two seasons in 1994. He helped PSG win both the 1994–95 Coupe de la Ligue and the 1994–95 Coupe de France, playing as a substitute in both finals, the latter against future club Strasbourg. He also scored as PSG won the 1995 Trophée des Champions. In 1996 he left for Strasbourg, winning the Coupe de la Ligue there in 1997 and staying for two seasons, before moving to Lens. While at Lens he played in the final as they won the 1998–99 Coupe de la Ligue, which was the third time he'd won the trophy in five seasons and with three different teams.

After two seasons at Lens, he left for Turkish club Beşiktaş, where he achieved phenomenal success and still maintains his popularity among Beşiktaş fans, who composed special songs for him. He played for them for one season before moving to play for Marseille the next year. He returned for a short spell at Beşiktaş the next season, but received a seven-month suspension for celebrating a goal against arch-rivals Fenerbahçe by putting his hands down his shorts, a gesture he described as "a private moment of joy". The Beşiktaş board were forced to cancel his contract as a result. The incident did not diminish his popularity with Beşiktaş fans, who still look back fondly on his lob shot against Dynamo Kyiv in the third round of the UEFA Cup in 2003.

Following this incident he played in Qatar and went on trial at clubs in countries like the US and Scotland.

== Personal life ==
Born in Épinay-sur-Seine, Seine-Saint-Denis, France, Nouma's ancestors are from Cameroon. He is particularly famous for his eccentric behaviour both on and off the pitch. During an interview with Hürriyet he claimed to be a Turk and to feel that Turkey was his home country.

Nouma works as an actor, and made his film debut in a Turkish movie, Dünyayı Kurtaran Adamın Oğlu (The Son of the Man Who Saved the World).

Nouma co-hosted radio show "Aragaz" along with professional radio host Kadir Çöpdemir at local radio station Metro FM.

Nouma became a member of Beşiktaş Congress in July 2012. In 2017, he played with Mustafa Topaloğlu in "Didi" commercials.

== Honours ==
Paris Saint-Germain

- Coupe de France: 1994–95
- Coupe de la Ligue: 1994–95
- Trophée des Champions: 1995
- UEFA Cup Winners' Cup: 1995–96

Strasbourg

- Coupe de la Ligue: 1996–97

Lens

- Coupe de la Ligue: 1998–99
