= Oumar Dieng =

French-Senegalese footballer (born 1972)

Personal information
- Date of birth: 30 December 1972 (age 53)
- Place of birth: Dakar, Senegal
- Height: 1.82 m (6 ft 0 in)
- Position: Defender

Youth career
- Jeanne d'Arc

Senior career*
Years	Team	Apps	(Gls)
1989–1991	Lille	21	(0)
1991–1992	→ Louhans-Cuiseaux (loan)	33	(0)
1992–1994	Lille	62	(0)
1994–1996	Paris Saint-Germain	35	(1)
1996–1998	Sampdoria	28	(0)
1998–1999	Auxerre	28	(0)
1999–2000	→ Sedan (loan)	17	(0)
2000–2002	Çaykur Rizespor	52	(0)
2002–2004	Trabzonspor	17	(0)
2004–2005	→ Konyaspor (loan)	24	(0)
2005–2006	Akratitos	10	(0)
2006–2007	Kavala		

International career
- France olympic team
- * Club domestic league appearances and goals

Oumar Dieng (born 30 December 1972) is a former professional footballer who played as a defender. He represented the France olympic team at the 1993 Mediterranean Games.

== Club career ==
Born in Dakar, Dieng began playing youth football with ASC Jeanne d'Arc. The defender moved to France at age 15, and signed with Lille OSC after being recommended by Bernard Lama. He made his Ligue 1 debut with Lille in 1989. After a few matches with the first team, he went on loan to CS Louhans-Cuiseaux for one season. Dieng would return to Lille until he transferred to Paris Saint-Germain in 1996.

Dieng spent most of his career in France's Ligue 1. He has also played for Sampdoria in Italy's Serie A, Çaykur Rizespor, Trabzonspor and Konyaspor in the Turkish Super Lig, and with Kavala F.C. in the Super League Greece.

== International career ==
Dieng played for France at the 1996 Summer Olympics in Atlanta.

== Honours ==
Trabzonspor

- Turkish Cup: 2002–03
