= José Cobos (footballer) =

French footballer (born 1968)

Personal information
- Full name: José Javier Cobos Castillo
- Date of birth: 23 April 1968 (age 58)
- Place of birth: Strasbourg, France
- Height: 1.80 m (5 ft 11 in)
- Positions: Left-back; centre-back

Youth career
- Strasbourg

Senior career*
Years	Team	Apps	(Gls)
1988–1993	Strasbourg	153	(10)
1993–1996	Paris Saint-Germain	76	(1)
1996–1998	Espanyol	54	(1)
1998–1999	Toulouse	21	(0)
1999–2005	Nice	171	(7)
Total		475	(19)

Managerial career
- 2005–2007: Nice (assistant)
- * Club domestic league appearances and goals

José Javier Cobos Castillo (born 23 April 1968), known as Cobos, is a French former professional footballer who played as a left-back.

== Career ==
Born in Strasbourg, Cobos started playing professionally with hometown club Strasbourg, helping it return to Ligue 1 in 1992. He had already played in the top flight in the 1988–89 season, his official debut coming on 30 July 1988 in a 1–0 away loss against Montpellier.

Afterwards, Cobos spent three-and-a-half years with Paris Saint-Germain, helping with 14 matches as the capital side won the league in 1994 and he was a more important part of the first-team unit in the following season, as they conquered the Coupe de France. Additionally, in the latter season, he played in all the games to help his team reach the last-four in the European Cup. He also helped them win the 1995–96 UEFA Cup Winners' Cup, but he was not part of the squad for the final, and the 1995 Trophée des Champions.

Late into 1996, Cobos moved to the land of his ancestors, signing with Spain's Espanyol and being a regular during his stay. Aged 30, he returned to his country, playing one year with Toulouse then joining Nice, which he helped promote to the top level in his third season by appearing in ten matches – ironically, he would feature significantly more in the following years, with the Côte d'Azur side always maintaining their division status.

After retiring, with French first division totals of 251 games and 13 goals (plus 170 and five in Ligue 2), Cobos continued to work with his last club, serving a two-year spell as assistant coach. In January 2009, two years after leaving Nice, he joined Monaco as its director of football, but only lasted three months in office.

== Personal life ==
Cobos' older brother, Vincent, was also a footballer and a defender. He too played mainly for Strasbourg, and the siblings shared teams from 1988 to 1991.
