= Francis Llacer =

French footballer (born 1971)

Personal information
- Date of birth: 9 September 1971 (age 55)
- Place of birth: Lagny-sur-Marne, France
- Height: 1.75 m (5 ft 9 in)
- Position: Defender

Youth career
- Chalifert
- CS Meaux
- 1985–1989: Paris Saint-Germain

Senior career*
Years	Team	Apps	(Gls)
1989–1999	Paris Saint-Germain	154	(4)
1996–1997	→ Strasbourg (loan)	14	(0)
2000	Feyenoord	19	(0)
2000–2001	Lille	22	(1)
2001–2003	Paris Saint-Germain	25	(0)
Total		234	(5)

International career
–1994	France U-21/Olympic	30	
	France A'	1	(0)
- * Club domestic league appearances and goals

Francis Llacer (born 9 September 1971) is a French former professional footballer who played as a defender.

During a 14-year professional career, Llacer played mainly for Paris Saint-Germain, and retired in 2003.

== Honours ==
Paris Saint-Germain

- Ligue 1: 1993–94
- Coupe de la Ligue: 1994–95
- Coupe de France: 1994–95
- UEFA Cup Winners' Cup: 1995–96
