= Stéphane Dedebant =

French footballer (born 1970)

Personal information
- Date of birth: 17 October 1970 (age 56)
- Place of birth: Paris
- Height: 1.70 m (5 ft 7 in)
- Position: Midfielder

Senior career*
Years	Team	Apps	(Gls)
1987–1992	Racing Club de France		
1992–1997	SM Caen		
1997–1998	LB Châteauroux		
1998–2001	FC Sochaux-Montbéliard		
2003-2005	AJS Ouistreham		
- * Club domestic league appearances and goals

Stéphane Dedebant (born 17 October 1970) is a retired French football midfielder. Following a career in France, he trialled with Hearts in 2001 before retiring. However after 2 years he played two seasons for AJS Ouistreham after moving to the area.
