= Paul Le Guen =

French football manager (born 1964)

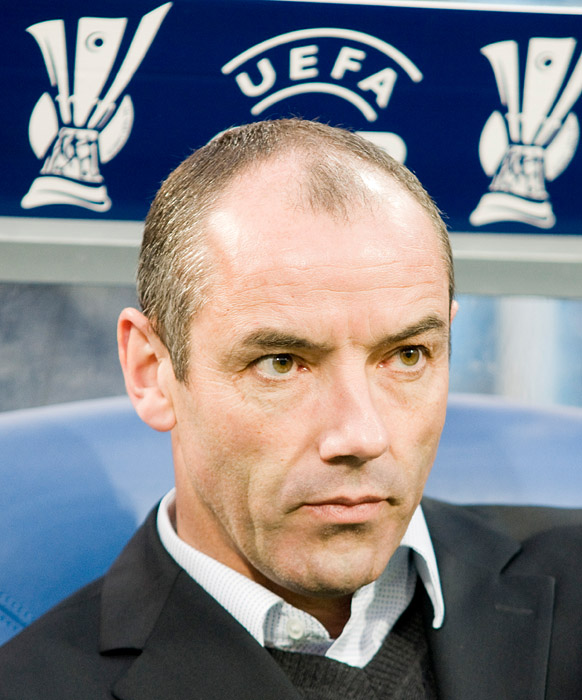
- Le Guen in 2009

Personal information
- Full name: Paul Joseph Marie Le Guen
- Date of birth: 1 March 1964 (age 62)
- Place of birth: Pencran, Finistère, France
- Height: 1.86 m (6 ft 1 in)
- Position: Midfielder

Youth career
- 1971–1977: GA Landerneau
- 1977–1982: US Pencran
- 1982–1983: AS Brest
- 1983–1984: Brest

Senior career*
Years	Team	Apps	(Gls)
1984–1989	Brest	120	(4)
1989–1991	Nantes	76	(1)
1991–1998	Paris Saint-Germain	248	(16)
Total		444	(21)

International career
1993–1995	France	17	(1)
1998	Brittany	1	(0)

Managerial career
- 1998–2001: Rennes
- 2002–2005: Lyon
- 2006–2007: Rangers
- 2007–2009: Paris Saint-Germain
- 2009–2010: Cameroon
- 2011–2015: Oman
- 2017–2018: Bursaspor
- 2019–2022: Le Havre
- * Club domestic league appearances and goals

Paul Joseph Marie Le Guen (French: [pɔl lə ɡwɛn], Breton: [pawl lø ɡwɛnː]; born 1 March 1964) is a French professional football manager and former player. He was most recently the manager of French club Le Havre.

During his playing career, Le Guen played as a midfielder, and enjoyed a successful stay with Paris Saint-Germain between 1991 and 1998, and won 17 caps for the France national team. As a manager, his most notable achievement has been winning the Ligue 1 title in each of his three seasons in charge of Lyon between 2002 and 2005.

== Club career ==
Le Guen was born in Pencran, Finistère. During his playing career, he played at Brest for five years and Nantes Atlantique for two years, before leaving his home region of Brittany for Paris Saint-Germain. In seven seasons at the Parc des Princes, he made 478 appearances, winning a league title, three French Cups, two League Cups and the Cup Winners' Cup medal in 1996. Le Guen scored the winning goal in the 1995 Coupe de France Final against Strasbourg.

== International career ==
At international level, Le Guen played 17 times for France, due to injuries and he was part of the team which lost out on a trip to the 1994 FIFA World Cup, along with Eric Cantona and David Ginola. He ended his playing career by taking part in a friendly where Brittany faced Cameroon on 21 May 1998. The match finished in a 1–1 draw.

== Managerial career ==
Le Guen had a successful managerial career in France, most notably leading Olympique Lyonnais to three consecutive Ligue 1 titles. He has also managed Stade Rennais, Paris Saint-Germain, Rangers, the Cameroon national team, the Oman national team, Bursaspor and Le Havre. In July 2016, he was to be named manager of the Nigeria national team, but didn't agree to the contract terms.

=== Rennes ===
During his time at Rennes between 1998 and 2001, Le Guen was noted for signing then unknown players, such as Shabani Nonda and El Hadji Diouf, who under his guidance, developed into talented footballers. He resigned from Rennes in 2001 after a fall-out with the club's board. This led to him taking a year off from football.

=== Lyon ===
Le Guen replaced Jacques Santini as manager of Olympique Lyonnais on 21 May 2002 after they captured their first league title. Le Guen experienced a grim start to his managerial career at Lyon, winning only three games of the first nine, but eventually took Lyon to a further three consecutive championships and reached the UEFA Champions League quarter-final. He resigned from his position at Lyon on 9 May 2005, the day after the club won their fourth consecutive Ligue 1 championship, with Gérard Houllier taking over.

After leaving the club, Le Guen embarked upon another year away from football management. During this time, he turned down management positions at several top European clubs, including Benfica and Lazio, and also stated that he would not return to manage his former club Paris Saint-Germain.

=== Rangers ===
On 11 March 2006, it was confirmed that Le Guen had agreed to replace Alex McLeish as manager of Rangers starting in the 2006–07 season. Le Guen signed a three-year contract with the option to extend his stay at Ibrox, and quickly acquired a number of players. Le Guen was the first Catholic to manage Rangers, a team with a historically Protestant identity.

Le Guen made a poor start to his Ibrox career. His record across his first ten league games was the worst start to a season by an Old Firm debutant since John Greig's team won only two, drew six and lost two of their opening ten games in 1978–79.

On 8 November, Rangers were knocked out of the Scottish League Cup at the quarter-final stage by First Division side St Johnstone. The result, the first time Rangers had been knocked out of a cup tournament by a lower league side at home, prompted protests outside Ibrox and demands for the situation to improve.

On 1 January 2007, Rangers announced that Le Guen had stripped Barry Ferguson of his captaincy of the club and dropped him from the squad for a match the following day. BBC Sport reported that Ferguson would not play for Rangers again under Le Guen.

Club chairman David Murray announced on 4 January 2007 that Le Guen had left Rangers by mutual consent. At the time, this made him the club's shortest-serving manager, and the only one to leave the club without completing a full season in charge.

Le Guen's European record with Rangers has been described as being 'excellent' after remaining unbeaten in the 2006–07 UEFA Cup and finishing at the top of their group. However, it was the poor domestic results that ultimately led to his departure.

=== Paris Saint-Germain ===
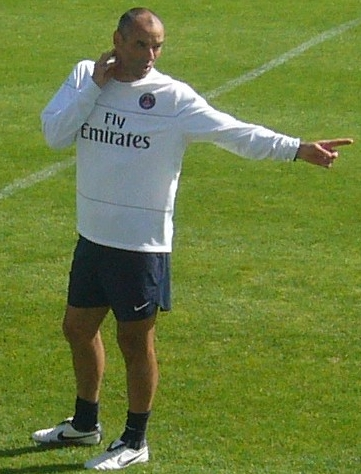
Le Guen during a training session with Paris Saint-Germain in November 2009

It was announced on 15 January 2007 that Le Guen would return to the club he once skippered as a player as first team coach replacing Guy Lacombe at Paris Saint-Germain. When Le Guen arrived, PSG were lying 17th in Ligue 1 but he led them to safety in his first season finishing 15th. As the 2007–08 season in Ligue 1 unfolded, it was clear that Le Guen was getting inconsistent performances from the crop of players, as the club was in the relegation zone with four games in the league season remaining, while winning the Coupe de la Ligue after beating Lens with 2–1, as well as qualifying for the final of the Coupe de France. Winning the Coupe de la Ligue guaranteed the side a place in the UEFA Cup for the 2008–09 season. PSG announced on 5 May 2009 that Le Guen would not be offered a new contract and would leave at the end of the 2008–09 season.

=== Cameroon national football team ===
Le Guen was named Cameroon national football team manager on 15 July 2009, penning a six-month contract. He made an immediate impact by leading the team to qualification for the 2010 FIFA World Cup. Le Guen also stripped veteran defender Rigobert Song of the captaincy and the appointment of Samuel Eto'o as the new captain. Both players responded well to the change with Eto'o scoring goals, and Song winning back his starting spot as the Lions qualified for the finals. However, Cameroon were the first team officially knocked out of the 2010 World Cup. Le Guen announced his resignation on 24 June 2010.

=== Oman national football team ===
Towards the end of the 2010–11 season, Le Guen claimed he had received job offers from several Ligue 1 clubs that were seeking new candidates to fill the remaining vacancies, but he turned them all down. He eventually accepted an offer from Oman national football team on 11 June 2011. He led Oman to qualification for the 2015 AFC Asian Cup, where they were to be absent in 2011. Oman were eliminated in the group stage of the tournament with one win and two losses. Le Guen was sacked on 19 November 2015 after a poor start of the 2018 FIFA World Cup qualification campaign.

=== Bursaspor ===
Le Guen was announced as the new manager of Süper Lig team Bursaspor on 22 June 2017, His first game was on 11 August 2017, a 1–0 league defeat away to İstanbul Başakşehir. However, a string of poor results meant he was removed from his managerial post on 10 April 2018.

=== Le Havre ===
On 29 May 2019, after ten years of managing abroad, Le Guen returned to France to become the new manager of Le Havre, replacing Oswald Tanchot. His debut game as manager came on 26 July 2019, ending in a 2–2 away draw to Ajaccio.

After a 6th-place finish in his debut campaign, Le Guen signed a new contract in August 2020, extending his deal by two years to 2023. He was dismissed in June 2022, having not led the team to promotion and amidst negotiations for a sale of the club to a North American consortium.

== Personal life ==
Le Guen met his wife Claude during his studies for a master's degree in Economic Sciences at the University of Western Brittany in Brest. As of 2006, they have three children. Le Guen ran the Marathon des Sables in the Moroccan desert in 2006.

== Managerial statistics ==
As of match played 19 June 2022

Managerial record by team and tenure
Team	From	To	Record					Ref.
Team	From	To	P	W	D	L	Win %	Ref.
Rennes	June 1998	May 2001	121	52	23	46	42.98	
Lyon	21 May 2002	9 May 2005	156	85	43	28	54.49	
Rangers	9 May 2006	4 January 2007	31	16	8	7	51.61	
Paris Saint-Germain	15 January 2007	1 June 2009	132	62	30	40	46.97	
Cameroon	15 July 2009	24 June 2010	19	7	5	7	36.84	
Oman	12 June 2011	19 November 2015	85	31	28	26	36.47	
Bursaspor	22 June 2017	10 April 2018	34	13	7	14	38.24	
Le Havre	29 May 2019	19 June 2022	110	37	37	36	33.64	
Total			688	303	181	204	44.04	

== Honours ==
=== Player ===
Paris Saint-Germain

- Division 1: 1993–94
- Coupe de France: 1992–93, 1994–95, 1997–98
- Coupe de la Ligue: 1994–95, 1997–98
- Trophée des Champions: 1995
- UEFA Cup Winners' Cup: 1995–96; runner-up: 1996–97

=== Manager ===
Lyon

- Ligue 1: 2002–03, 2003–04, 2004–05
- Trophée des Champions: 2002, 2003, 2004

Paris Saint-Germain

- Coupe de la Ligue: 2007–08
- Coupe de France runner-up: 2007–08
