= Vincent Fernandez =

French footballer (born 1975)

Personal information
- Full name: Vincent Fernandez
- Date of birth: 31 January 1975 (age 51)
- Place of birth: Saint-Germain-en-Laye, France
- Height: 1.83 m (6 ft 0 in)
- Position: Goalkeeper

Youth career
- 1991–1993: Paris Saint-Germain

Senior career*
Years	Team	Apps	(Gls)
1993–1998	Paris Saint-Germain	13	(0)
1995–1996	→ Châteauroux (loan)	39	(0)
1998–2002	Sochaux	133	(0)
2002–2004	Strasbourg	38	(0)
2004–2012	Châteauroux	223	(0)
Total		446	(0)

International career
1995–1996	France U21	5	(0)
- * Club domestic league appearances and goals

Vincent Fernandez (born 31 January 1975) is a French former professional footballer who played as a goalkeeper.

Born in Saint-Germain-en-Laye, Yvelines, Fernandez began his career with Paris Saint-Germain. He was loaned to LB Châteauroux to experience first-team football and when he returned to PSG, he became sub for Bernard Lama, and then Dominique Casagrande. The 1997–98 season was one of his best, because even though he did not play much in the championship, he still won two cups, playing in both the Coupe de la Ligue final and the Coupe de France final against Bordeaux and Lens respectively. In 1998 FC Sochaux, who had recently reached Ligue 1, offered him a place, which he took up and kept until Teddy Richert convinced him to play for RC Strasbourg. He played there for two years, but did not manage to shine, so he moved to the Ligue 2 side Châteauroux. He played for the club as starting goalkeeper for 8 years. (Note: Vincent Fernandez – French league stats at LFP – also available in French (archived))
