= Vincent Guérin =

French footballer (born 1965)

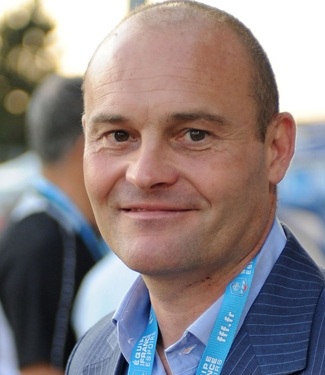
- Guérin in 2013

Personal information
- Date of birth: 22 November 1965 (age 60)
- Place of birth: Boulogne-Billancourt, France
- Height: 1.74 m (5 ft 9 in)
- Position: Midfielder

Senior career*
| Years | Team | Apps | (Gls) |
| 1984–1988 | Brest | 91 | (10) |
| 1988–1989 | Matra Racing | 34 | (2) |
| 1989–1992 | Montpellier | 98 | (9) |
| 1992–1998 | Paris Saint-Germain | 182 | (16) |
| 1998–1999 | Heart of Midlothian | 19 | (1) |
| Total | | 424 | (38) |

International career
| 1993–1996 | France | 19 | (2) |
- * Club domestic league appearances and goals

Vincent Guérin (French pronunciation: [vɛ̃sɑ̃ ɡeʁɛ̃]; born 22 November 1965) is a French former professional footballer who played as a central midfielder.

== Career ==
Guérin was born in Boulogne-Billancourt. In a career stretching from 1984 to 2002, he played for Stade Brestois 29, Matra Racing, Montpellier Hérault, Paris Saint-Germain, Heart of Midlothian in Scotland and, finally, with Red Star 93.

With Paris Saint Germain he won one Ligue 1 in 1994, placed second in 1993, 1996 and 1997, won the Coupe de France twice, in 1993 and 1995, won one Coupe de la Ligue in 1995, and one Cup Winners' Cup in 1996. He was also a finalist in the Cup Winners' Cup in 1997, and won another Coupe de France in 1990 with Montpellier.

With France, he made 13 appearances at under-21 level, winning the 1988 UEFA European Under-21 Championship in 1988. He earned 19 full international caps between 1993 and 1996, scoring 2 goals, as well as participating at Euro 1996.

== Doping controversy ==
In 1997, the French Football Federation moved to suspend Guérin after he failed a drugs test administered after a PSG game on 5 October. Guérin appealed unsuccessfully to the FFF's doping appeals commission, who awarded him an 18-month ban, 12 months of which were suspended. Guérin subsequently appealed to the French federal Administrative Court at Versaille, contesting the FFF's decision on several counts. The court at Versailles upheld one of Guérin's contentions, that the drugs test was improperly administered, and thus decreed that the entire process should be deemed void. Resultantly, the FFF-imposed suspension was annulled.

== Career statistics ==
Scores and results list France's goal tally first, score column indicates score after each Guérin goal.

List of international goals scored by Vincent Guérin
| No. | Date | Venue | Opponent | Score | Result | Competition |
|---|---|---|---|---|---|---|
| 1 | 26 April 1995 | Stade de la Beaujoire, Nantes, France | Slovakia | 4–0 | 4–0 | UEFA Euro 1996 qualifying |
| 2 | 6 September 1995 | Stade de l'Abbé-Deschamps, Auxerre, France | Azerbaijan | 3–0 | 10–0 | UEFA Euro 1996 qualifying |

== Honours ==
Montpellier

- Coupe de France: 1989–90

Paris Saint-Germain

- Division 1: 1993–94
- Coupe de France: 1992–93, 1994–95
- Coupe de la Ligue: 1994–95
- UEFA Cup Winners' Cup: 1995–96

Individual

- Division 1 Player of the Year: 1994–95
- French Player of the Year: 1997
