= 1994–95 Coupe de la Ligue =

French League Cup

Tournament details
- Country: France
- Dates: 29 November 1994 – 3 May 1995
- Teams: 44

Final positions
- Champions: Paris Saint-Germain (1st title)
- Runners-up: Bastia

Tournament statistics
- Matches played: 43
- Goals scored: 105 (2.44 per match)
- Top goal scorer: Stéphane Guivarc'h (4 goals)

The 1994–95 Coupe de la Ligue began on 29 November 1994 and the final took place on 3 May 1995 at the Stade de France. Paris Saint-Germain went on to win the tournament, beating Bastia 2–0 in the final.

== First round ==
The matches were played on 29 November 1994.

Team 1	Score	Team 2
Sedan	2–0	Valence
Nancy	2–2 (a.e.t.) (2–4 p)	Perpignan
Châteauroux	2–0	Nîmes
Le Mans	3–0	Beauvais
Gueugnon	1–2	Red Star
Charleville	0–2	Dunkerque
Guingamp	2–0	Rouen
Amiens	2–2 (a.e.t.) (5–4 p)	Angers
Valenciennes	2–0	Laval
Toulouse	2–1	Mulhouse
Niort	1–0 (a.e.t.)	Marseille
Alès	1–1 (a.e.t.) (3–5 p)	Stade Briochin

== Second round ==
The matches were played on 3 and 4 January 1995.

Team 1	Score	Team 2
Bastia	3–0	Amiens
Cannes	2–3	Lyon
Caen	3–1	Saint-Étienne
Dunkerque	1–0	Martigues
Guingamp	1–0	Valenciennes
Châteauroux	3–1 (a.e.t.)	Bordeaux
Le Mans	0–0 (a.e.t.) (4–2 p)	Stade Briochin
Le Havre	1–0	Lille
Metz	1–4	Monaco
Nice	0–3	Nantes
Niort	2–3	Lens
Perpignan	2–0	Strasbourg
Red Star	0–1	Montpellier
Rennes	1–0	Sedan
Toulouse	2–1	Sochaux
Paris Saint-Germain	1–0	Auxerre

== Round of 16 ==
The matches were played on 24, 25 January and 1 February 1995.

Team 1	Score	Team 2
Guingamp	2–1	Le Mans
Le Havre	2–1	Caen
Monaco	2–0	Dunkerque
Perpignan	1–1 (a.e.t.) (5–6 p)	Montpellier
Toulouse	2–2 (a.e.t.) (2–1 p)	Lens
Nantes	0–1 (a.e.t.)	Bastia
Paris Saint-Germain	2–1	Lyon
Châteauroux	1–1 (a.e.t.) (3–1 p)	Rennes

== Quarter-finals ==
The matches were played on 14 and 15 February 1995.

Team 1	Score	Team 2
Montpellier	2–0	Monaco
Bastia	1–1 (a.e.t.) (4–3 p)	Guingamp
Châteauroux	0–1	Le Havre
Paris Saint-Germain	3–0	Toulouse

== Semi-finals ==
The matches were played on 25 March 1995.

Team 1	Score	Team 2
Bastia	3–1	Montpellier
Le Havre	0–1	Paris Saint-Germain

== Final ==
The final was played on 3 May 1995 at the Parc des Princes.

3 May 1995
20:30

Paris Saint-Germain	2–0	Bastia
Roche 21'; Raí 84'

Parc des Princes, Paris
Attendance: 24,663
Referee: Marcel Lainé
