= Alain Roche (footballer) =

French footballer (born 1967)

Personal information
- Full name: Alain Roche
- Date of birth: 14 October 1967 (age 59)
- Place of birth: Brive-la-Gaillarde, Corrèze, France
- Height: 1.82 m (6 ft 0 in)
- Position: Defender

Senior career*
Years	Team	Apps	(Gls)
1985–1989	Bordeaux	131	(5)
1989–1990	Marseille	27	(0)
1990–1992	Auxerre	76	(7)
1992–1998	Paris Saint-Germain	193	(10)
1998–2000	Valencia	34	(3)
2000–2002	Bordeaux	58	(2)
Total		519	(25)

International career
1988–1996	France	25	(1)
- * Club domestic league appearances and goals

Alain Roche (born 14 October 1967) is a French former professional footballer who played as a defender. He spent significant time at Paris Saint-Germain, where he notably won the European Cup Winners' Cup. He earned his first international cap for France on 19 November 1988 against Yugoslavia in a 3–2 loss.

== Career ==
Roche played for Bordeaux, Marseille, Auxerre, Paris SG and Valencia. Whilst at PSG he scored when they won both the 1993 Coupe de France Final and the 1995 Coupe de la Ligue Final.

== Honours ==
Bordeaux

- Division 1: 1986–87
- Coupe de France: 1985–86, 1986–87

Marseille

- Division 1: 1989–90

Paris Saint-Germain

- Division 1: 1993–94
- Coupe de France: 1992–93, 1994–95, 1997–98
- Coupe de la Ligue: 1994–95, 1997–98
- UEFA Cup Winners' Cup: 1995–96

Valencia

- Copa del Rey: 1998–99
- UEFA Intertoto Cup: 1998

France U21

- UEFA European Under-21 Championship: 1988

Individual

- French Player of the Year: 1992
- Onze de Onze: 1994, 1995
