= Cyrille Pouget =

French footballer (born 1972)

Personal information
- Date of birth: 6 December 1972 (age 53)
- Place of birth: Metz, France
- Height: 1.76 m (5 ft 9 in)
- Position: Striker

Youth career
- Metz

Senior career*
Years	Team	Apps	(Gls)
1994–1996	Metz	68	(22)
1996	Servette	20	(9)
1997	Paris Saint-Germain	14	(2)
1997–1999	Le Havre	51	(15)
2000–2001	Marseille	23	(5)
2001	Bellinzona	7	(1)
2001–2002	Saint-Étienne	8	(1)
2003	Metz	11	(2)
2003–2006	Jeunesse Esch		

International career
1996	France	3	(0)
- * Club domestic league appearances and goals

Cyrille Pouget (French: [siʁil puʒɛ]; born 6 December 1972) is a French former professional footballer who played as a striker. While at Metz he played in the final as they won the 1995–96 Coupe de la Ligue.
