= 1994–95 Coupe de France =

Tournament details
- Country: France

Final positions
- Champions: Paris Saint-Germain
- Runners-up: Strasbourg

Tournament statistics
- Top goal scorer: Six players (3 goals)

The Coupe de France 1994–95 was its 78th edition. It was won by Paris SG.

== Round of 64 ==
| Team 1 | Score | Team 2 |
|---|---|---|
| Montpellier (D1) | 2–0 | Saint-Étienne (D1) |
| Paris Saint-Germain (D1) | 3–1 (a.e.t.) | Rennes (D1) |
| Sochaux (D1) | 0–0 (a.e.t.) (4–5 p) | Marseille (D2) |
| Metz (D1) | 2–0 | Dunkerque (D2) |
| Martigues (D1) | 1–0 | Le Mans (D2) |
| Caen (D1) | 1–3 | Saint-Brieuc (D2) |
| Sète (Nat.1) | 0–2 | Lille (D1) |
| Pau (Nat.1) | 1–2 | Nice (D1) |
| Dijon (Nat.1) | 0–1 (a.e.t.) | Bastia (D1) |
| Louhans-Cuiseaux (Nat.1) | 3–4 | Strasbourg (D1) |
| La Roche (Nat.1) | 0–2 | Auxerre (D1) |
| Château-Thierry (Nat.2) | 0–2 | Le Havre (D1) |
| Trélissac (Nat.2) | 0–4 | Lyon (D1) |
| Cluses-Scionzier (Nat.3) | 1–2 | Nantes (D1) |
| Forbach (Nat.3) | 2–4 | Bordeaux (D1) |
| Vitrolles (Nat.3) | 0–1 | Lens (D1) |
| Saint-Louisienne (Réu.) | 0–2 | Cannes (D1) |
| La Vitréenne (Ligue) | 0–5 | Monaco (D1) |
| Rouen (Nat.1) | 0–0 (a.e.t.) (4–5 p) | Châteauroux (D2) |
| Red Star (D2) | 0–1 (a.e.t.) | Stade Poitevin (Nat.1) |
| Cherbourg (Nat.2) | 3–1 | Laval (D2) |
| Montauban (Nat.3) | 1–2 | Beauvais (D2) |
| Châteaubriant (Nat.3) | 1–1 (a.e.t.) (1–3 p) | Angers (D2) |
| Ambert (Nat.3) | 0–1 | Nancy (D2) |
| Cagnes-sur-mer (DH) | 1–3 | Mulhouse (D2) |
| Schiltigheim (Nat.2) | 0–3 | Aubervilliers (Nat.1) |
| Noisy-le-Sec (Nat.1) | 2–0 (a.e.t.) | Saint-Priest (Nat.2) |
| Saint-Leu (Nat.1) | 3–0 | Vaulx-en-Velin (Nat.2) |
| Wasquehal (Nat.2) | 0–0 (a.e.t.) (1–4 p) | Fécamp (Nat.1) |
| Thouars (Nat.1) | 0–0 (a.e.t.) (4–3 p) | Vannes (Nat.2) |
| Saint-Lô (Nat.2) | 2–1 | Brest (Nat.1) |
| Niort Saint-Liguaire (DH) | 1–3 | Mont-de-Marsan (Nat.2) |

== Round of 32 ==
| Team 1 | Score | Team 2 |
|---|---|---|
| Strasbourg (D1) | 1–0 | Lille (D1) |
| Bastia (D1) | 3–0 | Cannes (D1) |
| Auxerre (D1) | 0–0 (a.e.t.) (4–3 p) | Lens (D1) |
| Martigues (D1) | 0–1 | Paris Saint-Germain (D1) |
| Nice (D1) | 0–1 | Marseille (D2) |
| Lyon (D1) | 1–3 | Angers (D2) |
| Aubervilliers (Nat.1) | 0–1 | Montpellier (D1) |
| Saint-Leu (Nat.1) | 1–1 (a.e.t.) (4–2 p) | Nantes (D1) |
| Stade Poitevin (Nat.1) | 2–1 | Monaco (D1) |
| Thouars (Nat.1) | 1–2 | Le Havre (D1) |
| Noisy-le-Sec (Nat.1) | 2–2 (a.e.t.) (2–3 p) | Metz (D1) |
| Mont-de-Marsan (Nat.2) | 1–2 | Bordeaux (D1) |
| Nancy (D2) | 2–1 | Saint-Brieuc (D2) |
| Fécamp (Nat.1) | 2–3 | Châteauroux (D2) |
| Cherbourg (Nat.2) | 1–3 | Beauvais (D2) |
| Saint-Lô (Nat.2) | 1–1 (a.e.t.) (2–4 p) | Mulhouse (D2) |

== Round of 16 ==
| Team 1 | Score | Team 2 |
|---|---|---|
| Le Havre (D1) | 0–0 (a.e.t.) (3–4 p) | Paris Saint-Germain (D1) |
| Auxerre (D1) | 1–2 | Bordeaux (D1) |
| Montpellier (D1) | 1–2 | Metz (D1) |
| Bastia (D1) | 0–1 | Nancy (D2) |
| Angers (D2) | 0–1 | Mulhouse (D2) |
| Marseille (D2) | 2–0 (a.e.t.) | Beauvais (D2) |
| Saint-Leu (Nat.1) | 1–3 | Strasbourg (D1) |
| Châteauroux (D2) | 4–1 | Stade Poitevin (Nat.1) |

== Quarter-finals ==
| 17 March 1995 | Strasbourg (1) | 2–0 (a.e.t.) | Bordeaux (1) | Strasbourg |
| | Mostovoi 99'; Sauzée 110' (pen.) | | | Stadium: Stade de la Meinau; Attendance: 20,155; Referee: Rémi Harrel |

| 17 March 1995 | Marseille (2) | 2–0 | Châteauroux (2) | Marseille |
| | Cascarino 51'; Cantona 53' | | | Stadium: Stade Vélodrome; Attendance: 20,000; Referee: Antoine De Pandis |

| 18 March 1995 | Nancy (2) | 0–2 | Paris Saint-Germain (1) | Tomblaine |
| | | | Ricardo 45', 57' | Stadium: Stade Marcel Picot; Attendance: 16,976; Referee: Bernard Saules |

| 18 March 1995 | Metz (1) | 2–0 | Mulhouse (2) | Metz |
| | Pouget 66'; Kastendeuch 83' (pen.) | | | Stadium: Stade Saint-Symphorien; Attendance: 13,265; Referee: Antoine De Pandis |

== Semi-finals ==
| 11 April 1995 | Paris Saint-Germain (1) | 2–0 | Marseille (2) | Paris |
| | Ricardo 4'; Weah 33' | | | Stadium: Parc des Princes; Attendance: 46,000; Referee: Didier Pauchard |

| 12 April 1995 | Strasbourg (1) | 1–0 | Metz (1) | Strasbourg |
| | Pouliquen 75' | | | Stadium: Stade de la Meinau; Attendance: 36,229; Referee: Gilles Veissière |

== Final ==
13 May 1995
20:00

| Paris Saint-Germain | 1–0 | Strasbourg |
|---|---|---|
| Le Guen 49' |

Parc des Princes, Paris
Attendance: 46,698
Referee: Philippe Leduc

== Topscorer ==
Anthony Bancarel (3 goals)
Tony Cascarino (3 goals)
Cyrille Pouget (3 goals)
Ricardo Gomes (3 goals)
Bruno Roux (3 goals)
Sonny Anderson (3 goals)
