= 1998–99 Paris Saint-Germain FC season =

Paris Saint-Germain
1998–99 season
- President: Charles Biétry (until 22 December 1998); Laurent Perpère (from 22 December 1998)
- Head coach: Alain Giresse (until 8 October 1998); Artur Jorge (8 October 1998 - 13 March 1999); Philippe Bergeroo (from 13 March 1999)
- Stadium: Parc des Princes
- Division 1: 9th
- Coupe de France: Round of 32
- Coupe de la Ligue: Quarter-finals
- Trophée des Champions: Winners
- UEFA Cup Winners' Cup: First round
- Top goalscorer: League: Marco Simone (9); All: Marco Simone (10)
- Highest home attendance: 45,597 (vs Monaco, 20 September 1998)
- Lowest home attendance: 24,534 (vs Montpellier, 6 March 1999)
- Average home league attendance: 40,910
Home colours	Away colours

The 1998–99 season was Paris Saint-Germain's 29th season in existence. PSG played their home league games at the Parc des Princes in Paris, registering an average attendance of 40,910 spectators per match. The club was presided by Charles Biétry and Laurent Perpère and the team was coached by Alain Giresse, Artur Jorge and Philippe Bergeroo. Marco Simone was the team captain.

== Players ==
As of the 1998–99 season.

=== Squad ===
Note: Flags indicate national team as defined under FIFA eligibility rules; some limited exceptions apply. Players may hold more than one non-FIFA nationality.

No.	Pos.	Nation	Player
1	GK	FRA	Bernard Lama
3	DF	FRA	Nicolas Laspalles
4	DF	GER	Christian Wörns
5	DF	FRA	Alain Goma
6	MF	FRA	Bruno Carotti
7	MF	POR	Hélder Baptista
8	MF	FRA	Yann Lachuer
9	FW	ITA	Marco Simone (captain)
10	MF	NGA	Jay-Jay Okocha
11	MF	FRA	Xavier Gravelaine
14	DF	FRA	Francis Llacer
15	DF	FRA	Éric Rabésandratana
16	GK	FRA	Dominique Casagrande

No.	Pos.	Nation	Player
17	DF	FRA	Jimmy Algerino
18	FW	FRA	Nicolas Ouédec
19	FW	FRA	Laurent Leroy
20	FW	BRA	Adaílton
21	FW	FRA	Bruno Rodriguez
22	MF	RUS	Igor Yanovsky
23	MF	FRA	Pierre Ducrocq
24	FW	FRA	Mickaël Madar
25	DF	FRA	Grégory Paisley
26	DF	SEN	Aliou Cissé
27	FW	FRA	Didier Martel
28	MF	FRA	Jérôme Leroy
30	GK	FRA	Laurent Quievreux

== Pre-season and friendlies ==
Win Draw Loss

11 July 1998 Friendly	Villefranche-sur-Saône (France)	1–9	(France) Paris Saint-Germain	France

18 July 1998 Friendly	Paris Saint-Germain (France)	3–1	(Poland) Lech Poznan	France

22 July 1998 Friendly	Paris Saint-Germain (France)	1–0	(Bulgaria) Lokomotiv Sofia	France

25 July 1998 Friendly	Paris Saint-Germain (France)	1–1	(Spain) Athletic Bilbao	France

4 September 1998 Friendly	Paris Saint-Germain (France)	2–1	(France) Thouars	France

6 January 1999 Friendly	Nîmes (France)	1–2	(France) Paris Saint-Germain	France

28 March 1999 Friendly	Celta Vigo (Spain)	4–1	(France) Paris Saint-Germain	Vigo, Spain
		Report		Stadium: Balaídos

8 April 1999 Friendly	Red Star (France)	0–1	(France) Paris Saint-Germain	La Courneuve, France
		Report		Stadium: Stade Marville; Attendance: 900

17 April 1999 Friendly	Paris Saint-Germain (France)	3–1	(France) Raon-L’Etape	France

14 May 1999 Friendly	Auxerre (France)	0–0	(France) Paris Saint-Germain	France

== Competitions ==
=== Overall record ===
Competition	First match	Last match	Starting round	Final position	Record							
Competition	First match	Last match	Starting round	Final position	Pld	W	D	L	GF	GA	GD	Win %
Division 1	8 August 1998	29 May 1999	Matchday 1	9th	34	10	9	15	34	35	−1	29.41
Coupe de France	January 1999	February 1999	Round of 64	Round of 32	2	1	1	0	3	2	+1	50.00
Coupe de la Ligue	9 January 1999	6 March 1999	Round of 32	Quarter-finals	3	1	1	1	1	2	−1	33.33
Trophée des Champions	30 July 1998		Final	Winners	1	1	0	0	1	0	+1	100.00
UEFA Cup Winners' Cup	17 September 1998	1 October 1998	First round	First round	2	0	1	1	3	4	−1	0.00
Total					42	13	12	17	42	43	−1	30.95

Source: Competitions

=== Division 1 ===
==== League table ====
Pos	Team	Pld	W	D	L	GF	GA	GD	Pts	Qualification or relegation
7	Nantes	34	12	12	10	40	34	+6	48	Qualification to UEFA Cup first round (Note: Lens was qualified for the 1999–2000 UEFA Cup as winners of the 1998–99 Coupe de la Ligue. Also, Nantes was qualified for the 1999–2000 UEFA Cup as winners of the 1998–99 Coupe de France.)
8	Montpellier	34	11	10	13	53	50	+3	43	Qualification to Intertoto Cup second round
9	Paris Saint-Germain	34	10	9	15	34	35	−1	39	
10	Metz	34	9	12	13	28	37	−9	39	Qualification to Intertoto Cup second round
11	Nancy	34	10	9	15	35	45	−10	39	

Source: Ligue 1
Rules for classification: 1) points; 2) goal difference; 3) number of goals scored.

==== Results summary ====
Overall								Home						Away					
Pld	W	D	L	GF	GA	GD	Pts	W	D	L	GF	GA	GD	W	D	L	GF	GA	GD
34	10	9	15	34	35	−1	39	7	4	6	20	15	+5	3	5	9	14	20	−6

Source: Division 1

==== Results by round ====
Round	1	2	3	4	5	6	7	8	9	10	11	12	13	14	15	16	17	18	19	20	21	22	23	24	25	26	27	28	29	30	31	32	33	34
Ground	A	H	A	H	A	H	A	H	A	A	H	A	H	A	H	A	H	A	H	A	H	A	H	A	H	H	A	H	A	H	A	H	A	H
Result	L	W	W	L	D	W	L	L	D	D	W	L	D	W	W	D	D	L	D	L	L	L	W	L	L	D	W	L	D	W	L	W	L	L
Position	17	7	5	8	10	8	8	12	10	9	8	10	11	8	6	6	7	8	9	11	11	11	11	11	12	12	9	10	9	9	10	8	9	9

Source: Division 1
A = Away; H = Home; W = Win; D = Draw; L = Loss

==== Matches ====
8 August 1998 1	Bordeaux	3–1	Paris Saint-Germain	Bordeaux
20:00 CEST (UTC+2)	Laslandes 56'; Wiltord 58'; Benarbia 88'		Okocha 77'	Stadium: Parc Lescure; Attendance: 38,893; Referee: Alain Sars

15 August 1998 2	Paris Saint-Germain	2–0	Bastia	Paris
20:00 CEST (UTC+2)	Wörns 26'; Simone 54'			Stadium: Parc des Princes; Attendance: 38,004; Referee: Rémy Harrel

22 August 1998 3	Strasbourg	0–1	Paris Saint-Germain	Strasbourg
20:00 CEST (UTC+2)			Simone 63'	Stadium: Stade de la Meinau; Attendance: 25,527; Referee: Gilles Chéron

29 August 1998 4	Paris Saint-Germain	1–2	Lorient	Paris
20:00 CEST (UTC+2)	Simone 10' (pen.)		Soumah 77'; Pédron 78'	Stadium: Parc des Princes; Attendance: 41,107; Referee: Bruno Ruffray

11 September 1998 5	Nancy	0–0	Paris Saint-Germain	Tomblaine
20:00 CEST (UTC+2)				Stadium: Stade Marcel Picot; Attendance: 15,555; Referee: Gilles Veissière

20 September 1998 6	Paris Saint-Germain	1–0	Monaco	Paris
20:30 CEST (UTC+2)	Lachuer 13'			Stadium: Parc des Princes; Attendance: 45,597; Referee: Bernard Saules

25 September 1998 7	Sochaux	1–0	Paris Saint-Germain	Montbéliard
20:00 CEST (UTC+2)	Dallet 84'			Stadium: Stade Auguste-Bonal; Attendance: 8,665; Referee: Bruno Coué

4 October 1998 8	Paris Saint-Germain	0–1	Lens	Paris
20:30 CEST (UTC+2)			Eloi 83'	Stadium: Parc des Princes; Attendance: 40,081; Referee: Laurent Duhamel

16 October 1998 9	Lyon	1–1	Paris Saint-Germain	Lyon
20:30 CEST (UTC+2)	Cocard 47'		Simone 18'	Stadium: Stade de Gerland; Attendance: 37,413; Referee: Gilles Veissière

24 October 1998 10	Nantes	0–0	Paris Saint-Germain	Nantes
20:00 CEST (UTC+2)				Stadium: Stade de la Beaujoire; Attendance: 33,159; Referee: Rémi Harrel

30 October 1998 11	Paris Saint-Germain	2–0	Auxerre	Paris
20:00 CET (UTC+1)	Okocha 8', 54'			Stadium: Parc des Princes; Attendance: 44,520; Referee: Alain Sars

7 November 1998 12	Montpellier	2–1	Paris Saint-Germain	Montpellier
20:00 CET (UTC+1)	Delaye 30'; Džodić 45'		Okocha 64'	Stadium: Stade de la Mosson; Attendance: 22,242; Referee: Stéphane Bré

11 November 1998 13	Paris Saint-Germain	2–2	Metz	Paris
20:00 CET (UTC+1)	Kastendeuch 67' (o.g.); Simone 69' (pen.)		Meyrieu 31'; Rodriguez 80'	Stadium: Parc des Princes; Attendance: 42,989; Referee: Eric Poulat

15 November 1998 14	Le Havre	0–4	Paris Saint-Germain	Le Havre
20:30 CET (UTC+1)			Algerino 23'; Simone 36', 69'; Paisley 40'	Stadium: Stade Jules Deschaseaux; Attendance: 13,905; Referee: Claude Colombo

20 November 1998 15	Paris Saint-Germain	2–1	Rennes	Paris
20:00 CET (UTC+1)	Rabésandratana 38'; Leroy 67'		Nonda 65'	Stadium: Parc des Princes; Attendance: 42,853; Referee: Marc Batta

29 November 1998 16	Marseille	0–0	Paris Saint-Germain	Marseille
20:30 CET (UTC+1)				Stadium: Parc des Princes; Attendance: 56,346; Referee: Stéphane Bré

4 December 1998 17	Paris Saint-Germain	0–0	Toulouse	Paris
20:00 CET (UTC+1)				Stadium: Parc des Princes; Attendance: 36,010; Referee: Bertrand Layec

12 December 1998 18	Bastia	2–0	Paris Saint-Germain	Furiani
20:00 CET (UTC+1)	Née 3', 45'			Stadium: Stade Armand-Cesari; Attendance: 5,143; Referee: Marc Batta

16 December 1998 19	Paris Saint-Germain	0–0	Strasbourg	Paris
20:00 CET (UTC+1)				Stadium: Parc des Princes; Attendance: 35,435; Referee: Patrick Anton

19 December 1998 20	Lorient	2–0	Paris Saint-Germain	Lorient
20:00 CET (UTC+1)	Loko 42' (pen.), 77'			Stadium: Stade du Moustoir; Attendance: 14,000; Referee: Philippe Kalt

17 January 1999 21	Paris Saint-Germain	1–2	Nancy	Paris
20:30 CET (UTC+1)	Fischer 90' (o.g.)		Koné 55'; Wiart 60'	Stadium: Parc des Princes; Attendance: 38,970; Referee: Stéphane Moulin

29 January 1999 22	Monaco	2–1	Paris Saint-Germain	Monaco
20:00 CET (UTC+1)	Ikpeba 5'; Cissé 80' (o.g.)		Rodriguez 28'	Stadium: Stade Louis II; Attendance: 6,464; Referee: Jean-Claude Puyalt

6 February 1999 23	Paris Saint-Germain	2–1	Sochaux	Paris
20:00 CET (UTC+1)	Madar 23'; Rodriguez 50'		Bouger 63'	Stadium: Parc des Princes; Attendance: 36,473; Referee: Claude Colombo

13 February 1999 24	Lens	2–1	Paris Saint-Germain	Lens
20:00 CET (UTC+1)	Dalmat 11'; Laspalles 84'		Simone 66'	Stadium: Stade Félix Bollaert; Attendance: 39,058; Referee: Serge Leon

25 February 1999 25	Paris Saint-Germain	0–1	Lyon	Paris
20:30 CET (UTC+1)			Caveglia 79' (pen.)	Stadium: Parc des Princes; Attendance: 38,906; Referee: Bernard Saules

10 March 1999 26	Paris Saint-Germain	0–0	Nantes	Paris
20:00 CET (UTC+1)				Stadium: Parc des Princes; Attendance: 40,640; Referee: Gilles Chéron

20 March 1999 27	Auxerre	0–1	Paris Saint-Germain	Auxerre
20:00 CET (UTC+1)			Rodriguez 43'	Stadium: Stade de l'Abbé Deschamps; Attendance: 13,085; Referee: Jean-Claude Puyalt

3 April 1999 28	Paris Saint-Germain	0–1	Montpellier	Paris
20:00 CEST (UTC+2)			Ouédec 77'	Stadium: Parc des Princes; Attendance: 40,563; Referee: Gilles Veissière

14 April 1999 29	Metz	1–1	Paris Saint-Germain	Metz
20:00 CEST (UTC+2)	Jestrović 57'		Algerino 46'	Stadium: Stade Saint-Symphorien; Attendance: 19,026; Referee: Marc Batta

25 April 1999 30	Paris Saint-Germain	3–0	Le Havre	Paris
18:00 CEST (UTC+2)	Madar 43', 54'; Wörns 45'			Stadium: Parc des Princes; Attendance: 42,882; Referee: Stéphane Bré

1 May 1999 31	Rennes	2–1	Paris Saint-Germain	Rennes
20:00 CEST (UTC+2)	Grégoire 14'; Bardon 89'		Adaílton 51'	Stadium: Stade de la Route de Lorient; Attendance: 15,538; Referee: Stéphane Moulin

4 May 1999 32	Paris Saint-Germain	2–1	Marseille	Paris
20:30 CEST (UTC+2)	Simone 84'; Rodriguez 88'		Maurice 21'	Stadium: Parc des Princes; Attendance: 44,939; Referee: Alain Sars

22 May 1999 33	Toulouse	2–1	Paris Saint-Germain	Toulouse
20:00 CEST (UTC+2)	Sié 18'; Batlles 83'		Algerino 7'	Stadium: Stade de Toulouse; Attendance: 15,270; Referee: Éric Poulat

29 May 1999 34	Paris Saint-Germain	2–3	Bordeaux	Paris
20:00 CEST (UTC+2)	Rodriguez 57'; Adaílton 77'		Wiltord 18', 60'; Feindouno 89'	Stadium: Parc des Princes; Attendance: 45,086; Referee: Claude Colombo

=== Coupe de France ===
9 February 1999 Round of 64	Thouars Foot 79	1–2 (a.e.t.)	Paris Saint-Germain	Poitiers
20:30 CET (UTC+1)	Dudoit 45'		Adaílton 33', 108'	Stadium: Stade de la Pépinière; Attendance: 10,000; Referee: Bruno Ruffray

20 February 1999 Round of 32	Paris Saint-Germain	1–1 (a.e.t.) (4–5 p)	Nantes	Paris
20:30 CET (UTC+1)	Ducrocq 85'		Decroix 7'	Stadium: Parc des Princes; Attendance: 25,000; Referee: Marc Batta

=== Coupe de la Ligue ===
9 January 1999 Round of 32	Paris Saint-Germain	1–0	Saint-Étienne	Paris
17:00 CET (UTC+1)	Madar 64'			Stadium: Parc des Princes; Attendance: 41,485; Referee: Bruno Coué

1 February 1999 Round of 16	Monaco	0–0 (a.e.t.) (2–3 p)	Paris Saint-Germain	Monaco
20:45 CET (UTC+1)				Stadium: Stade Louis II; Attendance: 4,000; Referee: Alain Sars

6 March 1999 Quarter-finals	Paris Saint-Germain	0–2	Montpellier	Paris
20:45 CET (UTC+1)			Mahouvé 58'; Silvestre 81'	Stadium: Parc des Princes; Attendance: 24,534; Referee: Rémi Harrel

=== Trophée des Champions ===
30 July 1998 Final	Lens	0–1	Paris Saint-Germain	Tours
21:00 CEST (UTC+2)			Lachuer 54'	Stadium: Stade de la Vallée du Cher; Attendance: 10,365; Referee: Gilles Chéron

=== UEFA Cup Winners' Cup ===
==== First round ====
17 September 1998 First leg	Paris Saint-Germain (France)	1–1	(Israel) Maccabi Haifa	Paris, France
20:45 CEST (UTC+2)	Simone 82' (pen.)	Report	Benayoun 87'	Stadium: Parc des Princes; Attendance: 28,183; Referee: Herbert Fandel (Germany)

1 October 1998 Second leg	Maccabi Haifa (Israel)	3–2 (4–3 agg.)	(France) Paris Saint-Germain	Haifa, Israel
20:30 CEST (UTC+2)	Keisi 57'; Mizrahi 77', 90'	Report	Ouédec 72'; Okocha 86'	Stadium: Kiryat Eliezer Stadium; Attendance: 10,500; Referee: Fernand Meese (Belgium)
