= 1994–95 FC Nantes Atlantique season =

Nantes Atlantique
1994–95 season
- Chairman: Guy Scherrer
- Manager: Jean-Claude Suaudeau
- Stadium: Stade de la Beaujoire
- Division 1: 1st (champions)
- Coupe de France: Round of 32
- Coupe de la Ligue: Round of 16
- UEFA Cup: Quarter-finals
- Top goalscorer: League: Patrice Loko (22); All: Nicolas Ouédec (26)
- Average home league attendance: 23,223

During the 1994–95 season, Nantes Atlantique competed in the French Division 1, the Coupe de France, Coupe de la Ligue, and the UEFA Cup.

Nantes Atlantique won their seventh French league title, thereby qualifying for the 1995–96 UEFA Champions League. With only one loss, against RC Strasbourg on matchday 33, the club holds the record for fewest losses in a Ligue 1 season and most consecutive matches unbeaten in a single season at 32. Paris Saint-Germain would later equal Nantes' streak of 32 matches without defeat during the 2015–16 Ligue 1 season.

== Squad ==
Note: Flags indicate national team as defined under FIFA eligibility rules; some limited exceptions apply. Players may hold more than one non-FIFA nationality.

| No. | Pos. | Nation | Player |
|---|---|---|---|
| 1 | GK | FRA | Dominique Casagrande |
| 2 | DF | FRA | Christian Karembeu |
| 3 | DF | FRA | Serge Le Dizet |
| 4 | DF | FRA | Eddy Capron |
| 5 | DF | FRA | Éric Decroix |
| 6 | MF | FRA | Jean-Michel Ferri |
| 7 | MF | FRA | Claude Makelele |
| 8 | MF | FRA | Reynald Pedros |
| 9 | FW | FRA | Nicolas Ouédec |
| 10 | MF | CHA | Japhet N'Doram |
| 11 | FW | FRA | Patrice Loko |
| 33 | FW | NGA | Samson Siasia |

| No. | Pos. | Nation | Player |
|---|---|---|---|
| — | GK | FRA | Jean-Louis Garcia |
| — | GK | FRA | Éric Loussouarn |
| — | GK | FRA | David Marraud |
| — | DF | FRA | Laurent Guyot |
| — | DF | FRA | Stéphane Moreau |
| — | DF | FRA | Christophe Pignol |
| — | MF | FRA | Benoit Cauet |
| — | FW | FRA | Franck Renou |
| — | FW | FRA | David Garcion |

== Overall record ==
| Competition | First match | Last match | Starting round | Final position | Record | | | | | | | |
| Competition | First match | Last match | Starting round | Final position | Pld | W | D | L | GF | GA | GD | Win % |
|---|---|---|---|---|---|---|---|---|---|---|---|---|
| Division 1 | 29 July 1994 | 31 May 1995 | Matchday 1 | Winners | 38 | 21 | 16 | 1 | 71 | 34 | +37 | 55.26 |
| Coupe de France | 15 January 1995 | 4 February 1995 | Round of 64 | Round of 32 | 2 | 1 | 1 | 0 | 3 | 2 | +1 | 50.00 |
| Coupe de la Ligue | 3 January 1995 | 25 January 1995 | Round of 32 | Round of 16 | 2 | 1 | 0 | 1 | 3 | 1 | +2 | 50.00 |
| UEFA Cup | 13 September 1994 | 14 March 1995 | First round | Quarter-finals | 8 | 4 | 2 | 2 | 16 | 11 | +5 | 50.00 |
| Total | | | | | 50 | 27 | 19 | 4 | 93 | 48 | +45 | 54.00 |

Source: Competitions

== Competitions ==
=== French Division 1 ===
==== League table ====
| Pos | Team | Pld | W | D | L | GF | GA | GD | Pts | Qualification or relegation |
|---|---|---|---|---|---|---|---|---|---|---|
| 1 | Nantes (C) | 38 | 21 | 16 | 1 | 71 | 34 | +37 | 79 | Qualification to Champions League group stage |
| 2 | Lyon | 38 | 19 | 12 | 7 | 56 | 38 | +18 | 69 | Qualification to UEFA Cup first round |
| 3 | Paris Saint-Germain | 38 | 20 | 7 | 11 | 58 | 41 | +17 | 67 | Qualification to Cup Winners' Cup first round (Note: Paris Saint-Germain qualified for the 1995–96 UEFA Cup Winners' Cup as winners of the 1994–95 Coupe de France and 1994–95 Coupe de la Ligue.) |
| 4 | Auxerre | 38 | 15 | 17 | 6 | 59 | 34 | +25 | 62 | Qualification to UEFA Cup first round |
| 5 | Lens | 38 | 15 | 14 | 9 | 48 | 44 | +4 | 59 | Qualification to UEFA Cup first round |

Source: Ligue 1
Rules for classification: 1) points; 2) goal difference; 3) number of goals scored.
(C) Champions

==== Results summary ====
| Overall | | | | | | | | Home | | | | | | Away | | | | | |
| Pld | W | D | L | GF | GA | GD | Pts | W | D | L | GF | GA | GD | W | D | L | GF | GA | GD |
|---|---|---|---|---|---|---|---|---|---|---|---|---|---|---|---|---|---|---|---|
| 38 | 21 | 16 | 1 | 71 | 34 | +37 | 79 | 14 | 5 | 0 | 42 | 15 | +27 | 7 | 11 | 1 | 29 | 19 | +10 |

Source: Ligue 1

==== Results by round ====
| Round | 1 | 2 | 3 | 4 | 5 | 6 | 7 | 8 | 9 | 10 | 11 | 12 | 13 | 14 | 15 | 16 | 17 | 18 | 19 | 20 | 21 | 22 | 23 | 24 | 25 | 26 | 27 | 28 | 29 | 30 | 31 | 32 | 33 | 34 | 35 | 36 | 37 | 38 |
|---|---|---|---|---|---|---|---|---|---|---|---|---|---|---|---|---|---|---|---|---|---|---|---|---|---|---|---|---|---|---|---|---|---|---|---|---|---|---|
| Ground | H | A | H | A | H | A | H | A | H | A | H | A | H | A | H | H | A | H | A | H | A | H | A | H | A | H | A | H | A | H | A | H | A | A | H | A | H | A |
| Result | D | W | W | W | W | D | W | D | W | W | D | D | W | D | W | W | D | D | W | D | W | W | W | W | D | W | D | W | D | W | D | W | L | W | D | D | W | D |
| Position | 5 | 3 | 2 | 2 | 1 | 1 | 1 | 1 | 1 | 1 | 1 | 1 | 1 | 1 | 1 | 1 | 1 | 1 | 1 | 1 | 1 | 1 | 1 | 1 | 1 | 1 | 1 | 1 | 1 | 1 | 1 | 1 | 1 | 1 | 1 | 1 | 1 | 1 |

Source: Ligue 1
A = Away; H = Home; W = Win; D = Draw; L = Loss

=== Coupe de France ===
| 15 January 1995 Round of 64 | Cluses-Scionzier | 1–2 | Nantes | Cluses |
| | | | | Stadium: Stade Intercommunal Cluses-Scionzier |

| 4 February 1995 Round of 32 | Saint-Leu 95 | 1–1 (a.e.t.) (4–2 p) | Nantes | Saint-Leu-la-Forêt |
| | | | | Stadium: Les Andresys |

=== UEFA Cup ===
==== First round ====
| 13 September 1994 First leg | Rotor Volgograd (Russia) | 3–2 | (France) Nantes | Volgograd |
| | Gerashchenko 42'; Nechay 65'; Veretennikov 76' | Report | Ouédec 28'; N'Doram 83' | Referee: Sándor Varga (Hungary) |

| 27 September 1994 Second leg | Nantes (France) | 3–0 (5–3 agg.) | (Russia) Rotor Volgograd | Nantes |
| | Ouédec 29', 61'; Loko 75' | Report | | Referee: Manfred Schüttengruber (Austria) |

==== Second round ====
| 18 October 1994 First leg | Nantes (France) | 2–0 | (Russia) Tekstilshchik Kamyshin | Nantes |
| | Ouédec 32' (pen.), 62' | Report | | Referee: Charles Agius (Malta) |

| 1 November 1994 Second leg | Tekstilshchik Kamyshin (Russia) | 1–2 (1–4 agg.) | (France) Nantes | Moscow |
| | Polstyanov 67' | Report | Ouédec 48', 64' | Referee: Roy Olsen (Norway) |

==== Third round ====
| 24 November 1994 First leg | Nantes (France) | 4–0 | (Switzerland) Sion | Nantes |
| | Loko 15'; Ferri 33'; N'Doram 51'; Makélélé 78' | Report | | Referee: Dermot Gallagher (England) |

| 8 December 1994 Second leg | Sion (Switzerland) | 2–2 (2–6 agg.) | (France) Nantes | Nantes |
| | Herr 76'; Marin 82' | Report | Loko 30'; N'Doram 31' | Referee: Hellmut Krug (Germany) |

==== Quarter-final ====
| 28 February 1995 First leg | Bayer Leverkusen (Germany) | 5–1 | (France) Nantes | Leverkusen |
| | Lehnhoff 9'; Kirsten 18', 89'; Paulo Sérgio 79', 84' | Report | Ouédec 64' (pen.) | Referee: Jorge Coroado (Portugal) |

| 14 March 1995 Second leg | Nantes (France) | 0–0 (1–5 agg.) | (Germany) Bayer Leverkusen | Nantes |
| | | Report | | Referee: Piero Ceccarini (Italy) |

== Statistics ==
=== Goal scorers ===
| Rank. | Name | Division 1 | Coupe de France | Coupe de la Ligue | UEFA Cup | Total |
|---|---|---|---|---|---|---|
| 1 | (France) Nicolas Ouédec | 18 | 0 | 0 | 8 | 26 |
| 2 | (France) Patrice Loko | 22 | 0 | 0 | 3 | 25 |
| 3 | (Chad) Japhet N'Doram | 12 | 0 | 1 | 3 | 16 |
| 4 | (France) Reynald Pedros | 5 | 0 | 1 | 0 | 6 |
| 5 | (France) Claude Makelele | 3 | 0 | 1 | 1 | 5 |
| 6 | (France) Christian Karembeu | 3 | 0 | 0 | 0 | 3 |
| 7 | (France) Christophe Pignol | 2 | 0 | 0 | 0 | 2 |
| 7 | (France) Jean-Michel Ferri | 1 | 0 | 0 | 1 | 2 |
| 7 | (France) Franck Renou | 2 | 0 | 0 | 0 | 2 |
| 10 | (France) Eddy Capron | 1 | 0 | 0 | 0 | 1 |
| 10 | (France) Éric Decroix | 0 | 1 | 0 | 0 | 1 |
| 10 | (France) Laurent Guyot | 0 | 1 | 0 | 0 | 1 |
| 10 | (France) Benoit Cauet | 1 | 0 | 0 | 0 | 1 |
| 10 | (Nigeria) Samson Siasia | 0 | 1 | 0 | 0 | 1 |
| Own goals | | 1 | 0 | 0 | 0 | 1 |
| Total | | 71 | 3 | 3 | 16 | 93 |
