= 1995–96 Paris Saint-Germain FC season =

26th season in existence of Paris Saint-Germain

Paris Saint-Germain
1995–96 season
- President: Michel Denisot
- Manager: Luis Fernandez
- Stadium: Parc des Princes
- Division 1: 2nd
- Coupe de France: Round of 16
- Coupe de la Ligue: Round of 32
- Trophée des Champions: Winners
- UEFA Cup Winners' Cup: Winners
- Top goalscorer: League: Julio Dely Valdés (15); All: Youri Djorkaeff (20)
- Average home league attendance: 37,353
Home colours	Away colours

The 1995–96 season was Paris Saint-Germain's 26th season in existence. PSG played their home league games at the Parc des Princes in Paris, registering an average attendance of 37,353 spectators per match. The club was presided by Michel Denisot and the team was coached by Luis Fernandez. Bernard Lama was the team captain.

== Players ==
As of the 1995–96 season.

=== Squad ===
Note: Flags indicate national team as defined under FIFA eligibility rules; some limited exceptions apply. Players may hold more than one non-FIFA nationality.

No.	Pos.	Nation	Player
—	GK	FRA	Bernard Lama (captain)
—	GK	FRA	Richard Dutruel
—	DF	FRA	Alain Roche
—	DF	FRA	Bruno Ngotty
—	DF	FRA	Paul Le Guen
—	DF	FRA	Oumar Dieng
—	DF	FRA	Stéphane Mahé
—	DF	FRA	Francis Llacer
—	DF	FRA	Didier Domi
—	DF	FRA	José Cobos
—	DF	FRA	Patrick Colleter
—	MF	FRA	Pierre Ducrocq

No.	Pos.	Nation	Player
—	MF	FRA	Laurent Fournier
—	MF	FRA	Daniel Bravo
—	MF	FRA	Vincent Guérin
—	MF	FRA	Cédric Pardeilhan
—	MF	BRA	Raí
—	MF	FRA	Bernard Allou
—	FW	ALG	Djamel Belmadi
—	FW	FRA	Youri Djorkaeff
—	FW	FRA	Patrice Loko
—	FW	PAN	Julio Dely Valdés
—	FW	FRA	Pascal Nouma
—	FW	FRA	Nicolas Anelka

=== Out on loan ===
Note: Flags indicate national team as defined under FIFA eligibility rules; some limited exceptions apply. Players may hold more than one non-FIFA nationality.

No.	Pos.	Nation	Player
—	GK	FRA	Vincent Fernandez (at Châteauroux)
—	DF	FRA	Jean-Claude Fernandes (at Nancy)
—	MF	FRA	Jérôme Leroy (at Laval)
—	MF	ALB	Edvin Murati (at Châteauroux)

No.	Pos.	Nation	Player
—	MF	FRA	Roméo Calenda (at Châteauroux)
—	MF	FRA	Xavier Gravelaine (at Guingamp)
—	FW	CMR	Patrick M'Boma (at Metz)

== Transfers ==
As of the 1995–96 season.

=== Arrivals ===
Note: Flags indicate national team as defined under FIFA eligibility rules; some limited exceptions apply. Players may hold more than one non-FIFA nationality.

No.	Pos.	Nation	Player
—	GK	FRA	Richard Dutruel (from Caen, end of loan)
—	DF	FRA	Stéphane Mahé (from Auxerre)
—	DF	FRA	Bruno Ngotty (from Lyon)
—	MF	FRA	Cédric Pardeilhan (from Pau)
—	MF	FRA	Laurent Fournier (from Bordeaux)
—	MF	FRA	Xavier Gravelaine (from Strasbourg, end of loan)
—	MF	FRA	Jérôme Leroy (from PSG Academy)

No.	Pos.	Nation	Player
—	MF	ALB	Edvin Murati (from PSG Academy)
—	FW	FRA	Nicolas Anelka (from PSG Academy)
—	FW	ALG	Djamel Belmadi (from PSG Academy)
—	FW	PAN	Julio Dely Valdés (from Cagliari)
—	FW	FRA	Youri Djorkaeff (from Monaco)
—	FW	FRA	Patrice Loko (from Nantes)

=== Departures ===
Note: Flags indicate national team as defined under FIFA eligibility rules; some limited exceptions apply. Players may hold more than one non-FIFA nationality.

No.	Pos.	Nation	Player
—	GK	FRA	Vincent Fernandez (loaned to Châteauroux)
—	GK	FRA	Luc Borrelli (to Caen)
—	DF	FRA	Jean-Claude Fernandes (loaned to Nancy)
—	DF	FRA	Antoine Kombouaré (to Sion)
—	DF	BRA	Ricardo (to Benfica)
—	MF	BRA	Valdo (to Benfica)
—	MF	FRA	Jérôme Leroy (loaned to Laval)

No.	Pos.	Nation	Player
—	MF	ALB	Edvin Murati (loaned to Châteauroux)
—	MF	FRA	Roméo Calenda (loaned to Châteauroux)
—	MF	FRA	Xavier Gravelaine (loaned to Guingamp)
—	FW	FRA	David Ginola (to Newcastle United)
—	FW	CMR	Patrick M'Boma (loaned to Metz)
—	FW	FRA	Jean-Philippe Séchet (to Saint-Étienne)
—	FW	LBR	George Weah (to AC Milan)

== Kits ==
Opel was the shirt sponsor, and Nike was the kit supplier.

Home	Away

== Competitions ==
=== Overview ===
Competition	First match	Last match	Starting round	Final position	Record							
Competition	First match	Last match	Starting round	Final position	Pld	W	D	L	GF	GA	GD	Win %
Division 1	18 July 1995	18 May 1996	Matchday 1	2nd	38	19	11	8	65	36	+29	50.00
Coupe de France	13 January 1996	24 February 1996	Round of 64	Round of 16	3	2	0	1	6	4	+2	66.67
Coupe de la Ligue	12 December 1995		Round of 32	Round of 32	1	0	0	1	1	2	−1	0.00
Trophée des Champions	3 January 1996		Final	Winners	1	0	1	0	2	2	+0	0.00
UEFA Cup Winners' Cup	14 September 1995	8 May 1996	First round	Winners	9	8	0	1	16	4	+12	88.89
Total					52	29	12	11	90	48	+42	55.77

Source: Competitions

=== Trophée des Champions ===
3 January 1996 Final	Paris Saint-Germain	2–2 (a.e.t.) (6–5 p)	Nantes	Brest
	Nouma 15'; Djorkaeff 38'		Ouédec 27'; Cauet 32'	Stadium: Stade Francis-Le Blé; Attendance: 12,000; Referee: Didier Pauchard
	Penalties
	Le Guen (penalty scored); Djorkaeff (penalty scored); Raí (penalty scored); Nouma (penalty scored); Colleter (penalty missed); Dely Valdés (penalty scored); Fournier (penalty scored)		(penalty scored) Carotti; (penalty scored) Gourvennec; (penalty missed) Pignol; (penalty scored) Pedros; (penalty scored) Cauet; (penalty scored) Peyrelade; (penalty missed) Makélélé

=== Division 1 ===
==== League table ====
Pos	Team	Pld	W	D	L	GF	GA	GD	Pts	Qualification or relegation
1	Auxerre (C)	38	22	6	10	66	30	+36	72	Qualification to Champions League group stage
2	Paris Saint-Germain	38	19	11	8	65	36	+29	68	Qualification to Cup Winners' Cup first round (Note: Paris Saint-Germain qualified for the Cup Winners' Cup as defending champions.)
3	Monaco	38	19	11	8	64	39	+25	68	Qualification to UEFA Cup first round
4	Metz	38	18	11	9	42	30	+12	65	Qualification to UEFA Cup first round
5	Lens	38	16	15	7	45	31	+14	63	Qualification to UEFA Cup first round

Source: Ligue 1
Rules for classification: 1) points; 2) goal difference; 3) number of goals scored.
(C) Champions

==== Results by round ====
Round	1	2	3	4	5	6	7	8	9	10	11	12	13	14	15	16	17	18	19	20	21	22	23	24	25	26	27	28	29	30	31	32	33	34	35	36	37	38
Ground	A	H	A	H	A	H	A	H	A	H	A	H	A	H	A	H	A	A	H	A	H	A	H	A	H	A	H	A	H	A	H	A	H	A	H	H	A	H
Result	D	D	W	W	W	W	W	W	L	W	L	D	D	W	W	W	W	D	W	D	W	D	D	D	W	L	L	L	W	W	W	L	L	W	D	L	D	W
Position	7	13	8	3	1	1	1	1	1	1	2	3	4	3	2	1	1	1	1	1	1	1	1	1	1	1	1	1	1	1	1	1	2	2	2	3	2	2

Source: Histoire du PSG
A = Away; H = Home; W = Win; D = Draw; L = Loss

==== Matches ====
18 July 1995 1	Bastia	2–2	Paris Saint-Germain	Furiani
	Laurent 21'; Drobnjak 89'		Raí 11', 17'	Stadium: Stade Armand-Cesari; Attendance: 7,000; Referee: Rémy Harrel

26 July 1995 2	Paris Saint-Germain	1–1	Guingamp	Paris
	Dely Valdés 42'		Divert 57'	Stadium: Parc des Princes; Attendance: 37,388; Referee: Philippe Kalt

4 August 1995 3	Nantes	1–2	Paris Saint-Germain	Nantes
	N'Doram 7'		Raí 21'; Nouma 83'	Stadium: Stade de la Beaujoire; Attendance: 32,410; Referee: Marc Batta

9 August 1995 4	Paris Saint-Germain	4–0	Saint-Étienne	Paris
	Djorkaeff 30', 76'; Dely Valdés 31'; Raí 70'			Stadium: Parc des Princes; Attendance: 32,989; Referee: Éric Poulat

19 August 1995 5	Gueugnon	1–3	Paris Saint-Germain	Gueugnon
	Fanzel 90'		Dely Valdés 4'; Raí 67'; Gravelaine 87'	Stadium: Stade Jean Laville; Attendance: 10,220; Referee: Jean-Claude Puyalt

26 August 1995 6	Paris Saint-Germain	2–0	Le Havre	Paris
	Dely Valdés 29'; Djorkaeff 90'			Stadium: Parc des Princes; Attendance: 31,315; Referee: Patrick Anton

29 August 1995 7	Cannes	0–2	Paris Saint-Germain	Cannes
			Dely Valdés 61'; Raí 85'	Stadium: Stade Pierre de Coubertin; Attendance: 10,000; Referee: Stéphane Bré

9 September 1995 8	Paris Saint-Germain	2–1	Monaco	Paris
	Dely Valdés 23'; Fournier 38'		Anderson 26'	Stadium: Parc des Princes; Attendance: 39,317; Referee: Bernard Saules

17 September 1995 9	Montpellier	1–0	Paris Saint-Germain	Montpellier
	Ngotty 19' (o.g.)			Stadium: Stade de la Mosson; Attendance: 13,352; Referee: Philippe Leduc

22 September 1995 10	Paris Saint-Germain	2–0	Strasbourg	Paris
	Dely Valdés 17', 64'			Stadium: Parc des Princes; Attendance: 33,093; Referee: Rémy Harrel

1 October 1995 11	Lens	3–1	Paris Saint-Germain	Lens
	Wallemme 8'; Camara 50'; Vairelles 83'		Nouma 77'	Stadium: Stade Bollaert-Delelis; Attendance: 33,215; Referee: Éric Poulat

4 October 1995 12	Paris Saint-Germain	1–1	Rennes	Paris
	Loko 28'		André 62'	Stadium: Parc des Princes; Attendance: 31,575; Referee: Claude Colombo

14 October 1995 13	Lyon	0–0	Paris Saint-Germain	Lyon
				Stadium: Stade de Gerland; Attendance: 30,725; Referee: Alain Sars

22 October 1995 14	Paris Saint-Germain	3–1	Auxerre	Paris
	Djorkaeff 2'; Raí 57'; Nouma 68'		Cocard 53'	Stadium: Parc des Princes; Attendance: 36,167; Referee: Gilles Chéron

26 October 1995 15	Metz	0–3	Paris Saint-Germain	Metz
			Guérin 12'; Raí 37', 90'	Stadium: Stade Saint-Symphorien; Attendance: 24,582; Referee: Bernard Saules

5 November 1995 16	Paris Saint-Germain	3–2	Nice	Paris
	Dely Valdés 47', 81'; Raí 71'		Le Guen 10' (o.g.); Debbah 56'	Stadium: Parc des Princes; Attendance: 32,155; Referee: Philippe Kalt

8 November 1995 17	Martigues	2–4	Paris Saint-Germain	Martigues
	Flachez 51'; Ichoua 80' (pen.)		Djorkaeff 43', 60'; Dely Valdés 55'; Nouma 90'	Stadium: Stade Francis Turcan; Attendance: 7,000; Referee: Serge Léon

18 November 1995 18	Lille	0–0	Paris Saint-Germain	Lille
				Stadium: Stade Grimonprez-Jooris; Attendance: 12,000; Referee: Alain Sars

25 November 1995 19	Paris Saint-Germain	3–0	Bordeaux	Paris
	Loko 2', 50'; Raí 53'			Stadium: Parc des Princes; Attendance: 42,012; Referee: Didier Pauchard

1 December 1995 20	Guingamp	0–0	Paris Saint-Germain	Guingamp
				Stadium: Stade de Roudourou; Attendance: 15,747; Referee: Patrick Anton

9 December 1995 21	Paris Saint-Germain	5–0	Nantes	Paris
	Dely Valdés 5'; Djorkaeff 31'; Loko 42'; Raí 46'; Nouma 89'			Stadium: Parc des Princes; Attendance: 42,034; Referee: Philippe Leduc

16 December 1995 22	Saint-Étienne	1–1	Paris Saint-Germain	Saint-Étienne
	Séchet 63' (pen.)		Dely Valdés 67'	Stadium: Stade Geoffroy-Guichard; Attendance: 15,467; Referee: Marc Batta

10 January 1996 23	Paris Saint-Germain	1–1	Gueugnon	Paris
	Djorkaeff 29'		Brunel 44'	Stadium: Parc des Princes; Attendance: 34,121; Referee: Claude Colombo

19 January 1996 24	Le Havre	1–1	Paris Saint-Germain	Le Havre
	Caveglia 90'		Raí 57'	Stadium: Stade Jules Deschaseaux; Attendance: 12,607; Referee: Stéphane Bré

27 January 1996 25	Paris Saint-Germain	2–1	Cannes	Paris
	Loko 43', 60'		Charvet 78'	Stadium: Parc des Princes; Attendance: 33,436; Referee: Patrick Anton

7 February 1996 26	Monaco	1–0	Paris Saint-Germain	Fontvieille
	Petit 66'			Stadium: Stade Louis II; Attendance: 8,000; Referee: Alain Sars

11 February 1996 27	Paris Saint-Germain	2–3	Montpellier	Paris
	Dely Valdés 49'; Llacer 76'		Sanchez 77'; Lefèvre 79'; Robert 81'	Stadium: Parc des Princes; Attendance: 32,967; Referee: Rémy Harrel

17 February 1996 28	Strasbourg	1–0	Paris Saint-Germain	Strasbourg
	Leboeuf 42' (pen.)			Stadium: Stade de la Meinau; Attendance: 18,690; Referee: Philippe Leduc

27 February 1996 29	Paris Saint-Germain	1–0	Lens	Paris
	Loko 35'			Stadium: Parc des Princes; Attendance: 44,526; Referee: Marc Batta

2 March 1996 30	Rennes	0–1	Paris Saint-Germain	Rennes
			Raí 20'	Stadium: Roazhon Park; Attendance: 17,531; Referee: Claude Colombo

10 March 1996 31	Paris Saint-Germain	2–0	Lyon	Paris
	Loko 42'; Ngotty 78'			Stadium: Parc des Princes; Attendance: 36,800; Referee: Jean-Claude Puyalt

24 March 1996 32	Auxerre	3–0	Paris Saint-Germain	Auxerre
	Diomède 44'; Martins 60'; Colleter 72' (o.g.)			Stadium: Stade de l'Abbé-Deschamps; Attendance: 16,000; Referee: Bernard Saules

30 March 1996 33	Paris Saint-Germain	2–3	Metz	Paris
	Fournier 57'; Le Guen 83'		Pires 37', 65'; Pouget 52'	Stadium: Parc des Princes; Attendance: 42,136; Referee: Stéphane Bré

9 April 1996 34	Nice	1–2	Paris Saint-Germain	Nice
	Chaouch 80'		Djorkaeff 65'; Le Guen 89'	Stadium: Stade du Ray; Attendance: 9,375; Referee: Patrick Anton

23 April 1996 35	Paris Saint-Germain	0–0	Martigues	Paris
				Stadium: Parc des Princes; Attendance: 41,428; Referee: Gilles Chéron

27 April 1996 36	Paris Saint-Germain	0–1	Lille	Paris
			Collot 87'	Stadium: Parc des Princes; Attendance: 37,762; Referee: Claude Colombo

11 May 1996 37	Bordeaux	2–2	Paris Saint-Germain	Bordeaux
	Bancarel 52', 62'		Djorkaeff 43'; Dieng 89'	Stadium: Stade Chaban-Delmas; Attendance: 25,635; Referee: Marc Batta

18 May 1996 38	Paris Saint-Germain	5–1	Bastia	Paris
	Dely Valdés 42'; Djorkaeff 39' (pen.), 58', 64'; Soumah 68' (o.g.)		Laurent 89'	Stadium: Parc des Princes; Attendance: 43,071; Referee: Didier Pauchard

=== Coupe de France ===
13 January 1996 Round of 64	Paris Saint-Germain	3–1	Châteauroux	Paris
	Loko 4', 63'; Djorkaeff 34'	Report	Murati 39'	Stadium: Parc des Princes; Attendance: 20,177; Referee: Gilles Cheron

3 February 1996 Round of 32	Paris Saint-Germain	2–0	Angers	Paris
	Ngotty 45'; Raí 88' (pen.)	Report		Stadium: Parc des Princes; Attendance: 15,913; Referee: Serge Leon

24 February 1996 Round of 16	Auxerre	3–1	Paris Saint-Germain	Auxerre
	Laslandes 5', 64'; Lamouchi 43'	Report	Djorkaeff 57'	Stadium: Stade de l'Abbé-Deschamps; Attendance: 15,000; Referee: Patrick Anton

=== Coupe de la Ligue ===
12 December 1995 Round of 32	Guingamp	2–1	Paris Saint-Germain	Guingamp
	Domi 73' (o.g.); Ray 98'	Report	Loko 40'	Stadium: Stade de Roudourou; Attendance: 6,000; Referee: Jean-Marc Gonon

=== UEFA Cup Winners' Cup ===
==== First round ====
14 September 1995 First leg	Molde (Norway)	2–3	(France) Paris Saint-Germain	Molde, Norway
20:30	Solskjær 56'; Stavrum 81'	Report	Le Guen 76'; Djorkaeff 78' (pen.); Dely Valdés 84'	Stadium: Molde Idrettspark; Attendance: 3,379; Referee: John Rowbotham (Scotland)

28 September 1995 Second leg	Paris Saint-Germain (France)	3–0 (6–2 agg.)	(Norway) Molde	Paris, France
20:30	Nouma 7', 13'; Djorkaeff 77'	Report		Stadium: Parc des Princes; Attendance: 18,898; Referee: Sándor Piller (Hungary)

==== Second round ====
19 October 1995 First leg	Paris Saint-Germain (France)	1–0	(Scotland) Celtic	Paris, France
20:30	Djorkaeff 76'	Report		Stadium: Parc des Princes; Attendance: 30,010; Referee: Günter Benkö (Austria)

2 November 1995 Second leg	Celtic (Scotland)	0–3 (0–4 agg.)	(France) Paris Saint-Germain	Glasgow, Scotland
19:45		Report	Loko 36', 42'; Nouma 68'	Stadium: Celtic Park; Attendance: 34,822; Referee: Kurt Röthlisberger (Switzerland)

==== Quarter-finals ====
7 March 1996 First leg	Parma (Italy)	1–0	(France) Paris Saint-Germain	Parma, Italy
20:45	Stoichkov 58'	Report		Stadium: Stadio Ennio Tardini; Attendance: 12,447; Referee: Sándor Puhl (Hungary)

21 March 1996 Second leg	Paris Saint-Germain (France)	3–1 (3–2 agg.)	(Italy) Parma	Paris, France
20:30	Raí 9' (pen.), 69' (pen.); Loko 38'	Report	Melli 26'	Stadium: Parc des Princes; Attendance: 43,686; Referee: Leif Sundell (Sweden)

==== Semi-finals ====
4 April 1996 First leg	Deportivo La Coruña (Spain)	0–1	(France) Paris Saint-Germain	A Coruña, Spain
21:00		Report	Djorkaeff 90'	Stadium: Estadio Riazor; Attendance: 21,100; Referee: Markus Merk (Germany)

18 April 1996 Second leg	Paris Saint-Germain (France)	1–0 (2–0 agg.)	(Spain) Deportivo La Coruña	Paris, France
21:00	Loko 59'			Stadium: Parc des Princes; Attendance: 43,965; Referee: Alfredo Trentalange (Italy)

==== Final ====
8 May 1996 Final	Paris Saint-Germain (France)	1–0	(Austria) Rapid Wien	Brussels, Belgium
20:15 CEST	Ngotty 29'			Stadium: King Baudouin Stadium; Attendance: 37,500; Referee: Pierluigi Pairetto (Italy)

== Statistics ==
As of the 1995–96 season.

=== Appearances and goals ===
No.	Pos	Nat	Player	Total		Division 1		Coupe de France		Coupe de la Ligue		Trophée des Champions		UEFA Cup Winners' Cup	
No.	Pos	Nat	Player	Apps	Goals	Apps	Goals	Apps	Goals	Apps	Goals	Apps	Goals	Apps	Goals
Goalkeepers
	GK	(France) FRA	Bernard Lama	44	0	34	0	2	0	0	0	1	0	7	0
	GK	(France) FRA	Richard Dutruel	10	0	6	0	1	0	1	0	0	0	2	0
Defenders
	DF	(France) FRA	Paul Le Guen	49	3	36	2	2	0	1	0	1	0	9	1
	DF	(France) FRA	Patrick Colleter	47	0	33	0	3	0	1	0	1	0	9	0
	DF	(France) FRA	Francis Llacer	40	1	28	1	2	0	1	0	0	0	9	0
	DF	(France) FRA	José Cobos	37	0	28	0	3	0	1	0	1	0	4	0
	DF	(France) FRA	Bruno Ngotty	33	3	24	1	2	1	0	0	0	0	7	1
	DF	(France) FRA	Stéphane Mahé	33	0	23	0	3	0	0	0	1	0	6	0
	DF	(France) FRA	Alain Roche	20	0	14	0	2	0	0	0	0	0	4	0
	DF	(France) FRA	Oumar Dieng	17	1	13	1	0	0	1	0	0	0	3	0
	DF	(France) FRA	Didier Domi	2	0	1	0	0	0	1	0	0	0	0	0
Midfielders
	MF	(France) FRA	Laurent Fournier	46	2	34	2	3	0	0	0	1	0	8	0
	MF	(France) FRA	Daniel Bravo	43	0	32	0	3	0	0	0	0	0	8	0
	MF	(France) FRA	Vincent Guérin	41	1	31	1	2	0	0	0	0	0	8	0
	MF	(Brazil) BRA	Raí	38	17	27	14	3	1	1	0	1	0	6	2
	MF	(France) FRA	Bernard Allou	24	0	19	0	1	0	1	0	0	0	3	0
	MF	(France) FRA	Pierre Ducrocq	3	0	1	0	0	0	1	0	1	0	0	0
	MF	(France) FRA	Cédric Pardeilhan	2	0	1	0	0	0	1	0	0	0	0	0
Forwards
	FW	(France) FRA	Youri Djorkaeff	47	20	35	13	2	2	1	0	1	1	8	4
	FW	(Panama) PAN	Julio Dely Valdés	43	16	33	15	3	0	0	0	1	0	6	1
	FW	(France) FRA	Patrice Loko	39	15	27	8	3	2	1	1	0	0	8	4
	FW	(France) FRA	Pascal Nouma	38	9	27	5	1	0	1	0	1	1	8	3
	FW	(France) FRA	Nicolas Anelka	2	0	2	0	0	0	0	0	0	0	0	0
	FW	(Algeria) ALG	Djamel Belmadi	1	0	1	0	0	0	0	0	0	0	0	0
Players transferred / loaned out during the season
	MF	(France) FRA	Xavier Gravelaine	6	1	5	1	0	0	0	0	0	0	1	0

Source: Competitions
