= 1995 Trophée des Champions =

- Event: Trophée des Champions
Paris Saint-Germain	Nantes
2	2
- Paris Saint-Germain won 6–5 on penalties
- Date: 3 January 1996
- Venue: Stade Francis-Le Blé, Brest, France
- Referee: Didier Pauchard
- Attendance: 12,000

The 1995 Trophée des Champions was a football match held at Stade Francis-Le Blé, Brest on 3 January 1996, that saw 1994–95 Coupe de France winners Paris Saint-Germain F.C. defeat 1994–95 Division 1 champions FC Nantes 6–5 on penalty kicks after a draw of 2–2.

== Match details ==
3 January 1996
20:35 CET

Paris Saint-Germain	2–2	Nantes
Nouma 5'; Djorkaeff 38'	Report	Ouédec 27'; Cauet 32'
Penalties
Le Guen (penalty scored); Djorkaeff (penalty scored); Raí (penalty scored); Nouma (penalty scored); Colleter (penalty missed); Dely Valdés (penalty scored); Fournier (penalty scored)	6–5	(penalty scored) Carotti; (penalty scored) Gourvennec; (penalty missed) Pignol; (penalty scored) Pedros; (penalty scored) Cauet; (penalty scored) Peyrelade; (penalty missed) Makélélé

Stade Francis-Le Blé, Brest
Attendance: 12,000
Referee: Didier Pauchard

Paris Saint-Germain	Nantes

PARIS-SAINT-GERMAIN:
GK	(France) Bernard Lama
RB	(France) José Cobos
CB	(France) Stéphane Mahé
CB	(France) Paul Le Guen
LB	(France) Patrick Colleter
MF	(France) Laurent Fournier
MF	(Brazil) Raí (c)
MF	(France) Pierre Ducrocq
MF	(France) Youri Djorkaeff
FW	(Panama) Julio Dely Valdés
FW	(France) Pascal Nouma
Manager:
(France) Luis Fernández

NANTES:
GK	(France) Dominique Casagrande
RB	(France) Serge Le Dizet	(substituted off) 46'
CB	(France) Bruno Carotti
CB	(France) Éric Decroix
LB	(France) Christophe Pignol
MF	(France) Claude Makélélé
MF	(France) Jean-Michel Ferri (c)
MF	(France) Benoît Cauet
MF	(France) Reynald Pedros
FW	(Chad) Japhet N'Doram	(substituted off) 69'
FW	(France) Nicolas Ouédec	(substituted off) 46'
Substitutes:
DF	(France) Jean-Marc Chanelet	(substituted on) 46'
MF	(France) Jocelyn Gourvennec	(substituted on) 46'
FW	(France) Laurent Peyrelade	(substituted on) 69'
Manager:
(France) Jean-Claude Suaudeau

== See also ==
- 1995–96 French Division 1
- 1995–96 Coupe de France
- 1995–96 Paris Saint-Germain FC season
