= Bruno Ngotty =

French footballer (born 1971)

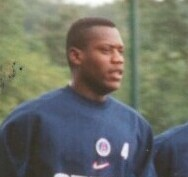
- Ngotty with Paris Saint-Germain, 1997 or 1998

Personal information
- Full name: Bruno Ngotty
- Date of birth: 10 June 1971 (age 55)
- Place of birth: Lyon, France
- Height: 1.85 m (6 ft 1 in)
- Position: Centre-back

Youth career
- Lyon

Senior career*
Years	Team	Apps	(Gls)
1988–1995	Lyon	237	(13)
1995–1998	Paris Saint-Germain	80	(7)
1998–2000	AC Milan	34	(1)
1999	→ Venezia (loan)	16	(0)
2000–2002	Marseille	32	(0)
2001–2002	→ Bolton Wanderers (loan)	14	(0)
2002–2006	Bolton Wanderers	134	(5)
2006–2007	Birmingham City	25	(1)
2007–2009	Leicester City	38	(0)
2008	→ Hereford United (loan)	8	(0)
2011	l’AS Lattes	0	(0)
Total		618	(27)

International career
1994–1997	France	6	(0)
- * Club domestic league appearances and goals

Bruno Ngotty (born 10 June 1971) is a French former professional footballer. He played as a centre-back from 1988 until 2008; however, he came out of retirement briefly in 2011.

As well as his native country, he has played in the top-flight divisions in both Italy and England. He has notably played for Olympique Lyonnais, Paris Saint-Germain, AC Milan, Olympique Marseille and Bolton Wanderers as well as earning six caps for France. He has also played for Venezia, Birmingham City, Leicester City and Hereford United. He came out of retirement to join French 6th-tier side l'AS Lattes in 2011.

== Early life ==
Ngotty was born in Lyon.

== Club career ==
=== Lyon ===
Ngotty started his career with Olympique Lyonnais from the opening of the 1988–89 season to the close of the 1994–95 season. Ngotty played 237 league games, scoring 13 goals during his time at Lyon.

=== Paris Saint-Germain ===
Ngotty scored the winning goal, which defeated Austrian club Rapid Wien in the 1996 UEFA Cup Winners' Cup Final, giving Paris Saint-Germain their only cup triumph in the tournament. He was also included in the squad that reached the final again the next year, losing to Barcelona 1–0 at Feyenoord Stadion.

=== AC Milan ===
Ngotty was part of the AC Milan team that won the Serie A title in 1999, making 25 league appearances for the club. He played alongside the likes of Paolo Maldini during his time there. He was sent on loan to Venezia during 1999, where he played 16 matches.

=== Marseille ===
After his relatively short spell at Milan, he returned to France with Olympique Marseille. This turned out to be an even shorter spell than his stay in Milan, which lasted for one season. He managed to play in 32 games during his only season at the club.

=== Bolton Wanderers ===
Ngotty originally rejected Bolton Wanderers' loan offer, but later agreed to spend the rest of the season with the club. The move eventually became a permanent deal. He made his Bolton debut against Blackburn Rovers, in a match which finished in a 1–1 draw, on 19 September 2001. He scored his debut goal for the club seven months later, his only goal of the season coming in a 3–1 defeat at Everton.

In January 2002, this move became permanent, Ngotty being cited as one of the prime chances for Bolton's success. His first full season for the club started in unfortunate style, as he received two yellow cards and one red card in his first six games. After this rather disappointing start, he became a regular part of the first team and was voted supporters' player of the year for the 2005 season. He originally wanted to end his career at the Reebok Stadium, but with manager Sam Allardyce wanting to reduce the average age of the squad, Ngotty was released at the end of his contract in May 2006.

=== Birmingham City ===
Ngotty was signed by Birmingham City on a one-year deal on 6 July. The team achieved promotion to the Premier League that same season, finishing as runners-up. He decided not to take up the option of another year at Birmingham. He scored two goals during his stay at Birmingham, against QPR in the league and Newcastle in the FA Cup.

=== Leicester City ===
On 4 June 2007, Ngotty moved to Leicester City on a free transfer, signing a two-year contract. Chairman Milan Mandarić revealed on 27 September that Ngotty was signed by him, and not then-manager Martin Allen, during a face-to-face meeting with the club's fans. Ngotty was named in the Championship Team of the Week following the club's 1–1 draw against Stoke City on 29 September, together with teammate Márton Fülöp. He played his 500th competitive game in an M69 Derby on 12 January 2008, in which Leicester won 2–0. Ngotty played a total of 38 league games as Leicester were relegated from the Championship.

When Nigel Pearson replaced Ian Holloway as the club's new manager, Ngotty played in only one pre-season game and was neither in the squad's tour of Slovenia nor the opening match of the season. On 25 September 2008, Ngotty joined Hereford United on loan for a month. Making his debut in Hereford's 1–0 defeat to Leeds United. The loan was extended for a further month on 25 October. However, it was cut short after Ngotty suffered a serious injury in a match against Peterborough United, leaving the field after nine minutes with a suspected ruptured Achilles. On 29 May 2009, Ngotty was released at the end of his contract.

In January 2011, Ngotty joined French 6th-tier side l'AS Lattes.

== International career ==
Ngotty was born in France and is of Cameroonian descent. Though many observers predicted that Ngotty's international career was to be successful, he made only six appearances with Les Bleus, making his debut on 17 August 1994 against the Czech Republic alongside Zinedine Zidane and Lilian Thuram, but while the two were soon able to secure their places in the national team, Ngotty failed to impress Aimé Jacquet and played only five more matches until 1997, never being called up for a major event.

== Career statistics ==
Appearances and goals by club, season and competition
Club	Season	League			National cup (Note: Includes Coupe de France, Coppa Italia, FA Cup)		League cup (Note: Includes Coupe de la Ligue, Football League Cup)		Continental		Other		Total	
Club	Season	Division	Apps	Goals	Apps	Goals	Apps	Goals	Apps	Goals	Apps	Goals	Apps	Goals
Lyon	1988–89	Division 2	30	1					–		–		30	1
Lyon	1989–90	Division 1	27	0					–		–		27	0
Lyon	1990–91	Division 1	37	2					–		–		37	2
Lyon	1991–92	Division 1	36	1					3 (Note: Appearances in UEFA Cup)	0	–		39	1
Lyon	1992–93	Division 1	36	3					–		–		36	3
Lyon	1993–94	Division 1	36	3					–		–		36	3
Lyon	1994–95	Division 1	35	3			1	0	–		–		36	3
Lyon	Total		237	13			1	0	3	0	–		241	13
Paris Saint-Germain	1995–96	Division 1	24	1			0	0	7 (Note: Appearances in UEFA Cup Winners' Cup)	1	–		31	2
Paris Saint-Germain	1996–97	Division 1	30	4			1	0	8	0	1 (Note: Appearance in UEFA Super Cup)	0	39	4
Paris Saint-Germain	1997–98	Division 1	26	2			2	0	6 (Note: Appearances in UEFA Champions League)	1	–		34	3
Paris Saint-Germain	Total		80	7			3	0	20	2	1	0	104	9
AC Milan	1998–99	Serie A	25	1	4	0	–		–		–		29	1
AC Milan	1999–2000	Serie A	9	0	1	0	–		2	0	1 (Note: Appearance in Supercoppa Italiana)	0	13	0
AC Milan	Total		34	1	5	0	–		2	0	1	0	42	1
Venezia (loan)	1999–2000	Serie A	16	0	2	0	–		–		–		18	0
Marseille	2000–01	Division 1	30	0	2	0	1	0	–		–		33	0
Marseille	2001–02	Division 1	2	0	0	0	0	0	–		–		2	0
Marseille	Total		32	0	2	0	1	0	–		–		35	0
Bolton Wanderers	2001–02	Premier League	26	1	0	0	3	0	–		–		29	1
Bolton Wanderers	2002–03	Premier League	23	1	1	0	0	0	–		–		24	1
Bolton Wanderers	2003–04	Premier League	33	3	0	0	6	1	–		–		39	4
Bolton Wanderers	2004–05	Premier League	37	0	4	0	0	0	–		–		41	0
Bolton Wanderers	2005–06	Premier League	29	0	2	0	1	0	7	1	–		39	1
Bolton Wanderers	Total		148	5	7	0	10	1	7	1	–		172	7
Birmingham City	2006–07	Championship	25	1	2	1	0	0	–		–		27	2
Leicester City	2007–08	Championship	38	0	1	0	4	0	–		–		43	0
Leicester City	2008–09	League One	0	0	0	0	0	0	–		–		0	0
Leicester City	Total		38	0	1	0	4	0	–		–		43	0
Hereford United (loan)	2008–09	League One	8	0	0	0	0	0	–		–		8	0
Career total			618	27	19	1	19	1	32	3	2	0	690	32

== Honours ==
Paris Saint-Germain

- Coupe de France: 1997–98
- Coupe de la Ligue: 1997–98
- Trophée des Champions: 1995
- UEFA Cup Winners' Cup: 1995–96

AC Milan

- Serie A: 1998–99

Bolton Wanderers

- Football League Cup runner-up: 2003–04
