= 1998 Trophée des Champions =

- Event: Trophée des Champions
Lens	Paris Saint-Germain
0	1
- Date: 30 July 1998
- Venue: Stade de la Vallée du Cher, Tours, France
- Referee: Gilles Chéron
- Attendance: 10,365

The 1998 Trophée des Champions was a football match held at Stade de la Vallée du Cher, Tours on 30 July 1998, that saw 1997–98 Coupe de France winners Paris Saint-Germain F.C. defeat 1997–98 Division 1 champions RC Lens 1–0.

== Match details ==
30 July 1998
21:00 CET

Lens	0–1	Paris Saint-Germain
	Report	Lachuer 54'

Stade de la Vallée du Cher, Tours
Attendance: 10,365
Referee: Gilles Chéron

LENS:
GK	1	(France) Guillaume Warmuz
RB	2	(France) Éric Sikora (c)
CB	13	(France) Frédéric Déhu
CB	22	(France) Xavier Méride
LB	3	(France) Yohan Lachor
MF	7	(France) Mickaël Debève	(substituted off) 74'
MF	8	(France) Stéphane Dalmat
MF	9	(Ghana) Alex Nyarko
FW	11	(France) Tony Vairelles
FW	19	(Czech Republic) Vladimír Šmicer
FW	21	(France) Pascal Nouma
Substitutes:
MF	18	(France) Philippe Brunel	(substituted on) 74'
Manager:
(France) Daniel Leclercq

PARIS-SAINT-GERMAIN:
GK	16	(France) Dominique Casagrande
RB	17	(France) Jimmy Algerino
CB	4	(Germany) Christian Wörns
CB	5	(France) Alain Goma
LB	21	(France) Didier Domi
CM	6	(France) Bruno Carotti (c)
CM	8	(France) Yann Lachuer
CM	23	(France) Pierre Ducrocq
FW	9	(Italy) Marco Simone
FW	11	(France) Patrice Loko
FW	18	(France) Nicolas Ouédec	(substituted off) 81'
Substitutes:
MF	19	(France) Jérôme Leroy	(substituted on) 81'
Manager:
(France) Alain Giresse

== See also ==
- 1998–99 French Division 1
- 1998–99 Coupe de France
- 1998–99 Paris Saint-Germain FC season
