= 1998–99 AS Nancy Lorraine season =

Nancy
1998–99 season
- Owner: Jacques Rousselot
- President: Jacques Rousselot
- Head coach: László Bölöni
- Stadium: Stade Marcel Picot
- French Division 1: 11th
- Coupe de France: Round of 64
- Coupe de la Ligue: Round of 16
- Top goalscorer: League: Tony Cascarino (12); All: Tony Cascarino (12)
- Highest home attendance: 18,516 vs Marseille
- Average home league attendance: 11,122

The 1998–99 AS Nancy Lorraine season was the club's 89th season in existence and the third consecutive season in the top flight of French football. In addition to the domestic league, Nancy participated in this season's editions of the Coupe de France and the Coupe de la Ligue. The season covered the period from 1 July 1998 to 30 June 1999.

== Pre-season and friendlies ==
Win Draw Loss

== Competitions ==
=== Overview ===
Competition	First match	Last match	Starting round	Final position	Record							
Competition	First match	Last match	Starting round	Final position	Pld	W	D	L	GF	GA	GD	Win %
French Division 1	8 August 1998	29 May 1999	Matchday 1	11th	34	10	9	15	35	45	−10	29.41
Coupe de France	23 January 1999		Round of 64	Round of 64	1	0	0	1	0	1	−1	0.00
Coupe de la Ligue	10 January 1999	2 Februar 1999	Round of 32	Round of 16	2	1	0	1	2	2	+0	50.00
Total					37	11	9	17	37	48	−11	29.73

Source: Competitions

=== French Division 1 ===
==== League table ====
Pos	Team	Pld	W	D	L	GF	GA	GD	Pts	Qualification or relegation
9	Paris Saint-Germain	34	10	9	15	34	35	−1	39	
10	Metz	34	9	12	13	28	37	−9	39	Qualification to Intertoto Cup second round
11	Nancy	34	10	9	15	35	45	−10	39	
12	Strasbourg	34	8	14	12	30	36	−6	38	
13	Bastia	34	10	8	16	37	46	−9	38	

Source: Ligue 1
Rules for classification: 1) points; 2) goal difference; 3) number of goals scored.

==== Results summary ====
Overall								Home						Away					
Pld	W	D	L	GF	GA	GD	Pts	W	D	L	GF	GA	GD	W	D	L	GF	GA	GD
34	10	9	15	35	45	−10	39	5	5	7	16	16	0	5	4	8	19	29	−10

Source: French Division 1

==== Results by round ====
Round	1	2	3	4	5	6	7	8	9	10	11	12	13	14	15	16	17	18	19	20	21	22	23	24	25	26	27	28	29	30	31	32	33	34
Ground	H	A	H	A	H	A	H	A	H	A	H	A	H	A	H	A	A	H	A	H	A	H	A	H	A	H	A	H	A	H	A	H	H	A
Result	D	L	W	L	D	D	D	W	L	L	L	W	L	D	W	W	L	D	L	L	W	L	L	W	L	L	W	D	L	W	D	W	L	D
Position	8	11	10	12	12	12	12	10	12	12	13	12	13	14	13	13	13	13	14	14	14	14	14	14	15	16	14	15	15	12	13	10	12	11

Source: French Division 1
A = Away; H = Home; W = Win; D = Draw; L = Loss

==== Matches ====
8 August 1998 1	Nancy	1–1	Sochaux	Tomblaine
				Stadium: Stade Marcel Picot

15 August 1998 2	Auxerre	3–2	Nancy	Auxerre

23 August 1998 3	Nancy	1–0	Nantes	Tomblaine
				Stadium: Stade Marcel Picot

29 August 1998 4	Lens	2–1	Nancy	Lens

11 September 1998 5	Nancy	0–0	Paris Saint-Germain	Tomblaine
				Stadium: Stade Marcel Picot

19 September 1998 6	Montpellier	1–1	Nancy	Montpellier

25 September 1998 7	Nancy	0–0	Lyon	Tomblaine
				Stadium: Stade Marcel Picot

4 October 1998 8	Metz	2–3	Nancy	Metz

17 October 1998 9	Nancy	0–1	Rennes	Tomblaine
				Stadium: Stade Marcel Picot

25 October 1998 10	Bordeaux	2–0	Nancy	Bordeaux

30 October 1998 11	Nancy	1–2	Bastia	Tomblaine
				Stadium: Stade Marcel Picot

7 November 1998 12	Strasbourg	1–2	Nancy	Strasbourg

10 November 1998 13	Nancy	2–3	Marseille	Tomblaine
20:30	Cascarino 52'; Kone 90'		Maurice 11', 78'; Gourvennec 22'	Stadium: Stade Marcel Picot; Attendance: 18,516; Referee: Patrick Anton

14 November 1998 14	Toulouse	1–1	Nancy	Toulouse

20 November 1998 15	Nancy	1–0	Le Havre	Tomblaine
				Stadium: Stade Marcel Picot

28 November 1998 16	Lorient	0–1	Nancy	Lorient

3 December 1998 17	Monaco	3–0	Nancy	Monaco

12 December 1998 18	Nancy	1–1	Auxerre	Tomblaine
				Stadium: Stade Marcel Picot

16 December 1998 18	Nantes	2–0	Nancy	Nantes

19 December 1998 20	Nancy	0–1	Lens	Tomblaine
				Stadium: Stade Marcel Picot

17 January 1999 21	Paris Saint-Germain	1–2	Nancy	Paris

30 January 1999 22	Nancy	0–1	Montpellier	Tomblaine
				Stadium: Stade Marcel Picot

6 February 1999 23	Lyon	2–1	Nancy	Lyon

26 February 1999 25	Rennes	2–1	Nancy	Rennes

9 March 1999 26	Nancy	2–3	Bordeaux	Tomblaine
				Stadium: Stade Marcel Picot

19 March 1999 27	Bastia	1–2	Nancy	Furiani

3 April 1999 28	Nancy	1–1	Strasbourg	Tomblaine
				Stadium: Stade Marcel Picot

9 April 1999 24	Nancy	1–0	Metz	Tomblaine
				Stadium: Stade Marcel Picot

15 April 1999 29	Marseille	4–0	Nancy	Marseille
20:00	Miolo 29'; Gourvennec 58'; Ravanelli 62'; Maurice 80'			Stadium: Stade Vélodrome; Attendance: 23,306; Referee: Patrick Lhermite

24 April 1999 30	Nancy	2–0	Toulouse	Tomblaine
20:00	Méride 80' (o.g.); Correa 90'			Stadium: Stade Marcel Picot; Attendance: 9,208; Referee: Marc Batta

1 May 1999 31	Le Havre	1–1	Nancy	Le Havre
				Stadium: Stade Jules Deschaseaux

5 May 1999 32	Nancy	2–0	Lorient	Tomblaine
				Stadium: Stade Marcel Picot

22 May 1999 33	Nancy	1–2	Monaco	Tomblaine
	Biancalani 19'		Giuly 13'; Costinha 90+1'	Stadium: Stade Marcel Picot; Attendance: 16,393; Referee: Stéphane Bré

29 May 1999 34	Sochaux	1–1	Nancy	Montbéliard
	Meriem 31'		Wiart 17'	Stadium: Stade Auguste Bonal; Attendance: 7,368; Referee: Bertrand Layec

=== Coupe de France ===
23 January 1999 Round of 64	Laval	1–0	Nancy	Laval
20:00	Calenda 35'			Stadium: Stade Francis Le Basser; Attendance: 3,760; Referee: Stéphane Bré

=== Coupe de la Ligue ===
10 January 1999 Round of 32	Nancy	1–0	Beauvais	Tomblaine
16:00	Kone 24'			Stadium: Stade Marcel Picot; Attendance: 3,500; Referee: Régis Champet

2 February 1999 Round of 16	Sochaux	2–1	Nancy	Montbéliard
16:45	Lang 57'; Ljuboja 90+1'		Rodrigues 74'	Stadium: Stade Auguste Bonal; Attendance: 2,500; Referee: Gilles Veissière
