= Alain Goma =

French footballer (born 1972)

Personal information
- Full name: Alain Goma
- Date of birth: 5 October 1972 (age 54)
- Place of birth: Sault, Vaucluse, France
- Height: 1.83 m (6 ft 0 in)
- Position: Centre-back

Youth career
- 1982–1988: Versailles
- 1988–1990: Auxerre

Senior career*
Years	Team	Apps	(Gls)
1990–1998	Auxerre	166	(4)
1998–1999	Paris Saint-Germain	30	(0)
1999–2001	Newcastle United	33	(1)
2001–2006	Fulham	117	(0)
2007–2008	Al-Wakrah		
Total		346	(5)

International career
1996–1998	France	2	(0)
- * Club domestic league appearances and goals

Alain Goma (born 5 October 1972) is a French former professional footballer who played as a centre-back. In a 16-year professional career he appeared in 196 Ligue 1 games, mostly for Auxerre. He then played 147 matches in the Premier League, with Newcastle and Fulham.

== Club career ==
Born in Sault, Vaucluse, Goma started his football career playing for Paris-suburb club Versailles, joining Auxerre's famed youth academy in 1988 at the age of 15. Three years later, he made his Ligue 1 debut for the team led by Guy Roux.

In 1992–93, Goma took part in Auxerre's unprecedented semifinal run in the UEFA Cup, where they lost in the semi-finals to Ajax in a penalty shootout. At the end of the season, he signed his very first professional contract, going on to be instrumental in the side's 1996 double while also helping them to the 1996–97 UEFA Champions League quarter-finals – losing to eventual winners Borussia Dortmund – after winning the group stage over Ajax.

After ten years at Auxerre, Goma moved to Paris Saint-Germain, conquering the 1998 Trophée des Champions soon after signing. After that single campaign, he joined Newcastle United for £4.7 million, becoming an important player at the start of 2000–01 and scoring in a 3–1 win against Middlesbrough in October 2000.

On 13 March 2001, following a dispute with the Magpies, Goma signed with First Division leaders Fulham, who paid a club record £4 million for his services. On 21 April 2001 he made his debut in a 1–1 draw at Portsmouth, and became a vital player for the club in its debut season in the Premier League, eventually serving as captain under countryman Jean Tigana.

Goma's form earned him a new contract during 2003–04, to keep him at the Cottagers until the summer of 2006. Despite missing two months due to injury, he made his 100th appearance during the campaign but, after the emergence of younger players such as Zat Knight, his importance and role gradually diminished in 2005–06; he was the most notable of six players released on 18 May 2006, after being unable to agree on a new deal.

Goma subsequently retired, aged 33. However, in 2007, he came out of retirement, joining Al-Wakrah in Qatar, and retiring for good the following year.

== International career ==
After starting representing the French under-21s in 1992, Goma would go on to earn two caps for the senior side. The first was on 9 October 1996, starting in a 4–0 friendly win against Turkey, and the second was in another exhibition game, coming on as a substitute for Frank Lebœuf for the last ten minutes of a 2–2 draw in Austria on 19 August 1998.

== Career statistics ==
Appearances and goals by club, season and competition
Club	Season	League			National cup (Note: Includes Coupe de France, FA Cup, Emir of Qatar Cup.)		League cup (Note: Includes Coupe de la Ligue, Football League Cup.)		Continental		Total	
Club	Season	Division	Apps	Goals	Apps	Goals	Apps	Goals	Apps	Goals	Apps	Goals
Auxerre	1990–91	French Division 1	1	0								
Auxerre	1991–92	French Division 1	1	0								
Auxerre	1992–93	French Division 1	15	1								
Auxerre	1993–94	French Division 1	33	0								
Auxerre	1994–95	French Division 1	28	0								
Auxerre	1995–96	French Division 1	32	0								
Auxerre	1996–97	French Division 1	34	2								
Auxerre	1997–98	French Division 1	22	1								
Auxerre	Total		166	4							166	4
Paris Saint-Germain	1998–99	French Division 1	30	0							30	0
Newcastle United	1999–2000	Premier League	14	0	1	0	0	0	2 (Note: Appearances in UEFA Cup)	0	17	0
Newcastle United	2000–01	Premier League	19	1	2	0	3	0	0	0	24	1
Newcastle United	Total		33	1	3	0	3	0	2	0	41	1
Fulham	2000–01	First Division	3	0	0	0	0	0	0	0	3	0
Fulham	2001–02	Premier League	33	0	6	0	1	0	0	0	40	0
Fulham	2002–03	Premier League	29	0	3	0	0	0	13 (Note: Eight appearances in UEFA Intertoto Cup, five appearances in UEFA Cup)	0	45	0
Fulham	2003–04	Premier League	23	0	6	0	0	0	0	0	29	0
Fulham	2004–05	Premier League	16	0	3	0	1	0	0	0	20	0
Fulham	2005–06	Premier League	13	0	1	0	1	0	0	0	15	0
Fulham	Total		117	0	19	0	3	0	13	0	152	0
Al-Wakrah	2007–08	Qatar Stars League										
Career total			346	5	22	0	6	0	15	0	389	5

== Honours ==
Auxerre

- Division 1: 1995–96
- Coupe de France: 1993–94, 1995–96

Paris Saint-Germain

- Trophée des Champions: 1998

Fulham

- Football League First Division: 2000–01
- UEFA Intertoto Cup: 2002
