= Franck Renou =

French footballer (born 1973)

Personal information
- Date of birth: 19 November 1973 (age 52)
- Place of birth: Ancenis
- Position: Midfielder

Youth career
- Nantes

Senior career*
Years	Team	Apps	(Gls)
1993–1996	Nantes		
1996–1999	Lille		
1999–2001	Sion		
2001–2002	Brest		
- * Club domestic league appearances and goals

Franck Renou (born 19 November 1973) is a French former professional footballer who played as a midfielder.

== Personal life ==
As of 2025, Renou was working as the director of a real estate agency in Valais, Switzerland.

== Honours ==
Nantes

- Division 1: 1994–95
