= 1998–99 AC Milan season =

Milan
1998–99 season
- President: Silvio Berlusconi
- Manager: Alberto Zaccheroni
- Stadium: San Siro
- Serie A: 1st
- Coppa Italia: Round of 16
- Top goalscorer: League: Oliver Bierhoff (20); All: Oliver Bierhoff (20)
- Average home league attendance: 57,760
Home colours	Away colours	Third colours

In the 1998–99 season, Associazione Calcio Milan returned to their previous winning ways under the guidance of new manager Alberto Zaccheroni. Hired from Udinese, Zaccheroni brought striker Oliver Bierhoff and right-wingback Thomas Helveg with him from his former club. He introduced Milan to his unorthodox 3–4–3 formation (in the latter half of the season modified to 3–4–1–2, to allow space for a creative attacking midfielder) in which Bierhoff was a perfect centre forward, scoring 20 goals in the league.

Milan had a marvelous second half of the season, in which they competed for the Serie A title with Lazio and Fiorentina. After seven straight wins in the last seven matches, Milan clinched the scudetto, becoming champions of Italy for the 16th time in their history.

== Squad ==
Note: Flags indicate national team as defined under FIFA eligibility rules; some limited exceptions apply. Players may hold more than one non-FIFA nationality.

No.	Pos.	Nation	Player
1	GK	ITA	Sebastiano Rossi
2	MF	DEN	Thomas Helveg
3	DF	ITA	Paolo Maldini
4	MF	ITA	Demetrio Albertini
5	DF	ITA	Alessandro Costacurta
7	MF	FRA	Ibrahim Ba
8	MF	ITA	Roberto Donadoni
9	FW	LBR	George Weah
10	MF	CRO	Zvonimir Boban
11	FW	ITA	Maurizio Ganz
12	GK	ITA	Christian Abbiati
13	MF	ITA	Giampiero Maini
13	FW	ITA	Alessandro Iannuzzi
14	DF	ARG	Roberto Ayala
15	DF	BRA	André Cruz

No.	Pos.	Nation	Player
16	GK	GER	Jens Lehmann
17	DF	GER	Christian Ziege
18	MF	BRA	Leonardo
19	DF	FRA	Samir Beloufa
20	FW	GER	Oliver Bierhoff
21	FW	NGA	Mohammed Aliyu Datti
21	DF	ITA	Giuseppe Cardone
23	MF	ITA	Massimo Ambrosini
24	MF	ARG	Andres Guly
25	MF	FRA	Bruno N'Gotty
26	DF	ITA	Luigi Sala
27	DF	ITA	Francesco Coco
30	MF	ITA	Domenico Morfeo
31	GK	ITA	Giorgio Frezzolini
32	MF	ITA	Federico Giunti

=== Transfers ===
In
Pos.	Name	from	Type
FW	Oliver Bierhoff	Udinese	-
MF	Thomas Helveg	Udinese	-
GK	Jens Lehmann	Schalke 04	
MF	Andres Guly	Gimnasia LP	-
DF	Roberto Ayala	Napoli	-
MF	Domenico Morfeo	Fiorentina	loan
MF	Bruno N'Gotty	Paris SG	
DF	Luigi Sala	Bari	-
GK	Christian Abbiati	Monza	
FW	Aliyu Datti	Ravenna	
MF	Massimo Ambrosini	Vicenza	loan ended
DF	Francesco Coco	Vicenza	loan ended
FW	Luca Saudati	Lecco	loan ended

Out
Pos.	Name	To	Type
FW	Patrick Kluivert	Barcelona	
FW	Dejan Savićević		
DF	Marcel Desailly	Chelsea	
FW	Filippo Maniero	Venezia	-
MF	Giampiero Maini	Bologna	
DF	Steinar Nilsen	SSC Napoli	
DF	Dario Smoje	Monza	
GK	Gabriele Aldegani	Como	
GK	Massimo Taibi	Veneza	
GK	Simone Braglia	Monza	
DF	Daniele Daino	SSC Napoli	loan
FW	Luca Saudati	Como	loan

==== Winter ====
In
Pos.	Name	from	Type
GK	Giorgio Frezzolini	Inter Milan	loan
GK	Dida	Cruzeiro	
MF	Federico Giunti	Parma	
FW	Alessandro Iannuzzi	Lazio	loan

Out
Pos.	Name	To	Type
GK	Jens Lehmann	Borussia Dortmund	-
DF	André Cruz	Standard Liege	-
DF	Giuseppe Cardone	Vicenza	-
GK	Dida	Lugano	loan

Starting line-up since Zaccheroni adopted, at the end of the first half of the season, a formation with a trequartista. Earlier, he had used a 3-4-3.

== Competitions ==
=== Serie A ===
==== League table ====
Pos	Team	Pld	W	D	L	GF	GA	GD	Pts	Qualification or relegation
1	Milan (C)	34	20	10	4	59	34	+25	70	Qualification to Champions League group stage
2	Lazio	34	20	9	5	65	31	+34	69	Qualification to Champions League group stage
3	Fiorentina	34	16	8	10	55	41	+14	56	Qualification to Champions League third qualifying round
4	Parma	34	15	10	9	55	36	+19	55	Qualification to Champions League third qualifying round
5	Roma	34	15	9	10	69	49	+20	54 (Note: ROM 7pts. JUV 5pts. UDI 4pts.)	Qualification to UEFA Cup first round

Source: Serie A, RSSSF.com, Soccerway
Rules for classification: 1) Points; 2) Head-to-head points; 3) Head-to-head goal difference; 4) Goal difference; 5) Goals scored; 6) Draw. (Note: Head-to-head record is used only after all the matches between the teams in question have been played).
(C) Champions

==== Results summary ====
Overall								Home						Away					
Pld	W	D	L	GF	GA	GD	Pts	W	D	L	GF	GA	GD	W	D	L	GF	GA	GD
34	20	10	4	59	34	+25	70	13	3	1	35	17	+18	7	7	3	24	17	+7

Source: Competitive matches

==== Results by round ====
Round	1	2	3	4	5	6	7	8	9	10	11	12	13	14	15	16	17	18	19	20	21	22	23	24	25	26	27	28	29	30	31	32	33	34
Ground	H	A	H	A	A	H	A	H	A	H	A	H	H	A	H	A	H	A	H	A	H	H	A	H	A	H	A	H	A	A	H	A	H	A
Result	W	W	L	W	L	W	D	D	D	W	L	W	W	D	D	D	W	W	W	D	W	W	L	W	D	D	D	W	W	W	W	W	W	W
Position	1	1	5	3	5	3	3	3	5	2	4	4	2	3	3	4	4	3	3	3	3	2	4	3	2	3	3	2	2	2	2	2	1	1

Source: Competitive matches
A = Away; H = Home; W = Win; D = Draw; L = Loss; P = Postponed; = Leader, 1999–2000 UEFA Champions League Group stage; = 1999–2000 UEFA Champions League Group stage; = 1999–2000 UEFA Champions League Qualifying round; = 1999–2000 UEFA Cup First round; = Qualification to Intertoto Cup; = 1999–2000 Serie B

==== Matches ====
12 September 1998 1	Milan	3–0	Bologna	Milan
20:30 CEST	Cappioli 45' (o.g.); Bierhoff 51' (pen.); Leonardo 82'	Report		Stadium: San Siro; Attendance: 50 732; Referee: Bazzoli

20 September 1998 2	Salernitana	1–2	Milan	Salerno
15:00 CEST	Breda 88'	Report	Bierhoff 68'; Leonardo 87'	Stadium: Arechi; Attendance: 34 412; Referee: Racalbuto

26 September 1998 3	Milan	1–3	Fiorentina	Milan
16:00 CEST	Bierhoff 69' (pen.)	Report	Batistuta 6, 46, 52'	Stadium: San Siro; Attendance: 67 970; Referee: Braschi

4 October 1998 4	Venezia	0–2	Milan	Venice
15:00 CEST		Report	Bierhoff 3'; Leonardo 69'	Stadium: Pierluigi Penzo; Attendance: 12 628; Referee: Ceccarini

18 October 1998 5	Cagliari	1–0	Milan	Cagliari
15:00 CEST	De Patre 19'	Report		Stadium: Sant'Elia; Attendance: 24045; Referee: Treossi

25 October 1998 6	Milan	3–2	Roma	Milan
15:00 CET	Leonardo 45'; Ziege 58'; Weah 72'	Report	Delvecchio 8, 69'	Stadium: San Siro; Attendance: 57 331; Referee: Collina

1 November 1998 7	Piacenza	1–1	Milan	Piacenza
15:00 CET	S. Inzaghi 44'	Report	Ganz 90 + 2'	Stadium: Leonardo Garilli; Attendance: 14 602; Referee: Pellegrino

8 November 1998 8	Milan	2–2	Inter Milan	Milan
20:30 CET	Weah 13'; Albertini 90' (pen.)	Report	Ronaldo 7'; Moriero 48'	Stadium: San Siro; Attendance: 80 814; Referee: Tombolini

15 November 1998 9	Bari	0–0	Milan	Bari
20:30 CET		Report		Stadium: San Nicola; Attendance: 39 114; Referee: Ceccarini

22 November 1998 10	Milan	1–0	Lazio	Milan
20:30 CET	Leonardo 90'	Report		Stadium: San Siro; Attendance: 45 935; Referee: Farina

29 November 1998 11	Parma	4–0	Milan	Parma
15:00 CET	Chiesa 25'; Crespo 36, 60'; Boghossian 90'	Report		Stadium: Il Tardini; Attendance: 27 641; Referee: De Santis

6 December 1998 12	Milan	3–0	Udinese	Milan
15:00 CET	Weah 22'; Leonardo 41'; Bierhoff 60'	Report		Stadium: San Siro; Attendance: 49 656; Referee: Collina

13 December 1998 13	Milan	1–0	Vicenza	Milan
15:00 CET	Weah 84'	Report		Stadium: San Siro; Attendance: 46258; Referee: Tombolini

20 December 1998 14	Sampdoria	2–2	Milan	Genoa
15:00 CET	Palmieri 58'; Ortega 86'	Report	Leonardo 39'; Bierhoff 73'	Stadium: Luigi Ferraris; Attendance: 22 763; Referee: Bettin

6 January 1999 15	Milan	1–1	Juventus	Milan
20:30 CET	Albertini 27' (pen.)	Report	Fonseca 85'	Stadium: San Siro; Attendance: 81 925; Referee: Bettin

10 January 1999 16	Empoli	1–1	Milan	Empoli
15:00 CET	Di Napoli 59'	Report	Ziege 84'	Stadium: Carlo Castellani; Attendance: 13 360; Referee: Collina

17 January 1999 17	Milan	2–1	Perugia	Milan
15:00 CET	Guly 37'; Bierhoff 40'	Report	Nakata 90' (pen.)	Stadium: San Siro; Attendance: 46 417; Referee: Bettin

24 January 1999 18	Bologna	2–3	Milan	Bologna
15:00 CET	Signori 15, 44'	Report	Guly 21'; Magoni 52' (o.g.); Ngotty 90'	Stadium: Renato Dall'Ara; Attendance: 34 938; Referee: Borriello

31 January 1999 19	Milan	3–2	Salernitana	Milan
15:00 CET	Bierhoff 3, 60'; Weah 25'	Report	Giampaolo 7'; Del Grosso 14'	Stadium: San Siro; Attendance: 47 756; Referee: Pellegrino

7 February 1999 20	Fiorentina	0–0	Milan	Florence
15:00 CET		Report		Stadium: Artemio Franchi; Attendance: 42 067; Referee: Trentalange

14 February 1999 21	Milan	2–1	Venezia	Milan
15:00 CET	Guly 39'; Ganz 53'	Report	Tuta 70'	Stadium: San Siro; Attendance: 47 579; Referee: Rosetti

21 February 1999 22	Milan	1–0	Cagliari	Milan
15:00 CET	M. Villa 49' (o.g.)	Report		Stadium: San Siro; Attendance: 52 811; Referee: Messina

27 February 1999 23	Roma	1–0	Milan	Rome
15:00 CET	Paulo Sérgio 64'	Report		Stadium: Olimpico; Attendance: 63 944; Referee: Bettin

7 March 1999 24	Milan	1–0	Piacenza	Milan
15:00 CET	Bierhoff 43'	Report		Stadium: San Siro; Attendance: 46 629; Referee: Cesari

13 March 1999 25	Inter Milan	2–2	Milan	Milan
20:30 CET	Ngotty 7' (o.g.); J. Zanetti 77'	Report	Leonardo 14, 52'	Stadium: Giuseppe Meazza; Attendance: 79 450; Referee: Collina

21 March 1999 26	Milan	2–2	Bari	Milan
15:00 CET	Bierhoff 42'; Ganz 90'	Report	Osmanovski 6, 80'	Stadium: San Siro; Attendance: 50 553; Referee: Pellegrino

3 April 1999 27	Lazio	0–0	Milan	Rome
15:00 CEST		Report		Stadium: Olimpico; Attendance: 63 875; Referee: Cesari

11 April 1999 28	Milan	2–1	Parma	Milan
15:00 CEST	Maldini 59'; Ganz 72'	Report	Balbo 39'	Stadium: San Siro; Attendance: 66 279; Referee: De Santis

18 April 1999 29	Udinese	1–5	Milan	Udine
15:00 CEST	Amoroso 58'	Report	Boban 15, 37'; Bierhoff 45, 60'; Weah 63'	Stadium: Friuli; Attendance: 38 663; Referee: Boggi

25 April 1999 30	Vicenza	0–2	Milan	Vicenza
15:00 CEST		Report	Bierhoff 40'; Leonardo 72'	Stadium: Romeo Menti; Attendance: 19 715; Referee: Tombolini

2 May 1999 31	Milan	3–2	Sampdoria	Milan
15:00 CEST	Ambrosini 17'; Leonardo 79'; Castellini 90' (o.g.)	Report	Montella 60'; Franceschetti 86'	Stadium: San Siro; Attendance: 68 653; Referee: Treossi

9 May 1999 32	Juventus	0–2	Milan	Turin
15:00 CEST		Report	Weah 46', 62'	Stadium: Delle Alpi; Attendance: 59 125; Referee: Cesari

15 May 1999 33	Milan	4–0	Empoli	Milan
16:30 CEST	Bierhoff 32, 55, 60'; Leonardo 88'	Report		Stadium: San Siro; Attendance: 74 758; Referee: Pellegrino

23 May 1999 34	Perugia	1–2	Milan	Perugia
15:00 CEST	Nakata 34' (pen.)	Report	Guly 11'; Bierhoff 31'	Stadium: Renato Curi; Attendance: 28 143; Referee: Braschi

=== Coppa Italia ===
==== Round of 32 ====
8 September 1998 1	Torino	2–0	Milan	Turin
	Ferrante 12', 37' (pen.)	Report		Stadium: Delle Alpi; Attendance: 18,136; Referee: Collina

23 September 1998 2	Milan	3–0 (3–2 agg.)	Torino	Milan
	Helveg 54'; Weah 57'; Bierhoff 87'	Report		Stadium: San Siro; Attendance: 32,194; Referee: Braschi

==== Round of 16 ====
29 October 1998 1	Lazio	3–1	Milan	Roma
	Mihajlović 28'; Mancini 71', 90'	Report	Bierhoff 7'	Stadium: Olimpico; Attendance: 22,520; Referee: Trentalange

11 November 1998 2	Milan	1–1 (2–4 agg.)	Lazio	Milan
	Ganz 55'	Report	Salas 41'	Stadium: San Siro; Attendance: 22,702; Referee: Braschi

== Statistics ==
=== Players statistics ===
No.	Pos	Nat	Player	Total		Serie A		Coppa Italia	
No.	Pos	Nat	Player	Apps	Goals	Apps	Goals	Apps	Goals
12	GK	(Italy) ITA	Abbiati	18	-15	17+1	-15	0	0
5	DF	(Italy) ITA	Costacurta	32	0	29	0	3	0
26	DF	(Italy) ITA	Sala	25	0	24	0	1	0
3	DF	(Italy) ITA	Maldini	33	1	31	1	2	0
2	MF	(Denmark) DEN	Helveg	31	1	26+1	0	4	1
4	MF	(Italy) ITA	Albertini	32	2	29	2	3	0
23	MF	(Italy) ITA	Ambrosini	29	1	23+3	1	3	0
24	MF	(Argentina) ARG	Guly	23	4	20+1	4	2	0
10	AM	(Croatia) CRO	Boban	31	2	21+6	2	4	0
20	FW	(Germany) GER	Bierhoff	37	21	34	19	3	2
9	FW	(Liberia) LBR	Weah	30	9	26	8	4	1
1	GK	(Italy) ITA	Rossi	16	-19	12+1	-14	3	-5
18	MF	(Brazil) BRA	Leonardo	29	12	16+11	12	2	0
25	MF	(France) FRA	N'Gotty	29	1	15+10	1	4	0
17	DF	(Germany) GER	Ziege	20	2	14+3	2	3	0
11	FW	(Italy) ITA	Ganz	24	5	11+9	4	4	1
7	MF	(France) FRA	Ba	18	0	6+9	0	3	0
14	DF	(Argentina) ARG	Ayala	13	0	6+5	0	2	0
30	MF	(Italy) ITA	Morfeo	13	0	6+5	0	2	0
16	GK	(Germany) GER	Lehmann	6	-6	5	-5	1	-1
32	MF	(Italy) ITA	Giunti	6	0	2+4	0	0	0
15	DF	(Brazil) BRA	André Cruz	3	0	1+1	0	1	0
8	MF	(Italy) ITA	Donadoni	10	0	0+9	0	1	0
27	DF	(Italy) ITA	Coco	6	0	0+6	0	0	0
13	MF	(Italy) ITA	Maini	1	0	0+1	0	0	0
21	FW	(Nigeria) NGA	Aliyu Datti	1	0	0+1	0	0	0
19	DF	(France) FRA	Beloufa	0	0	0	0	0	0
21	DF	(Italy) ITA	Cardone	0	0	0	0	0	0
31	GK	(Italy) ITA	Frezzolini	0	0	0	0	0	0
13	FW	(Italy) ITA	Iannuzzi	0	0	0	0	0	0

- Source: http://calcio-seriea.net/presenze/1998/1148/
