= Olivier Ichoua =

French footballer (born 1970)

Personal information
- Date of birth: 3 October 1970 (age 56)
- Place of birth: Nantes
- Position: Midfielder

Senior career*
Years	Team	Apps	(Gls)
1990–1991	FC Metz		
1991–1992	La Roche VF		
1992–1995	FC Metz		
1995–1996	FC Martigues		
1996–1998	FC Sochaux		
- * Club domestic league appearances and goals

Olivier Ichoua (born 3 October 1970) is a retired French football midfielder.
