= Stéphane Dalmat =

French footballer (born 1979)

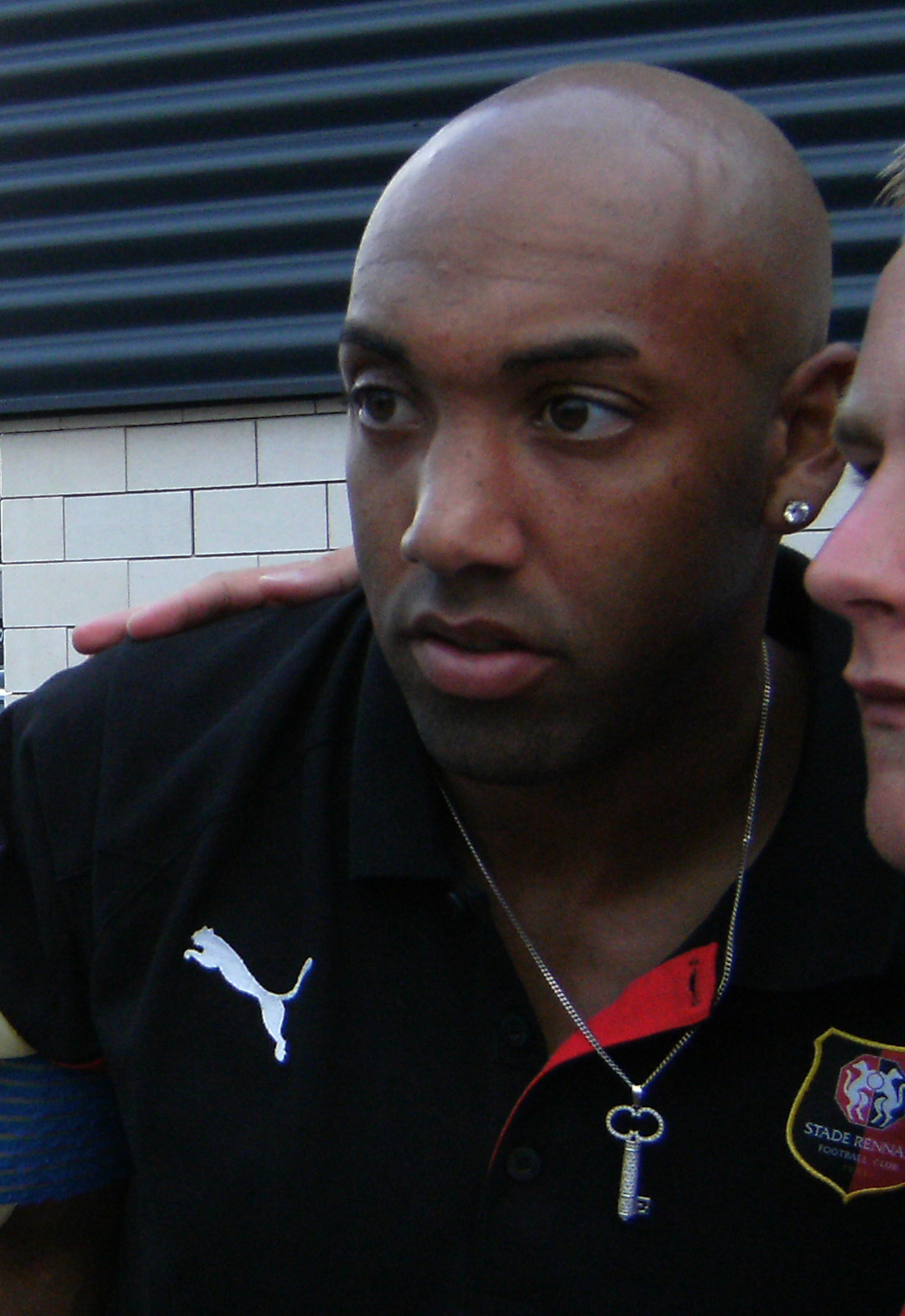
- Dalmat with Rennes

Personal information
- Date of birth: 16 February 1979 (age 47)
- Place of birth: Joué-lès-Tours, France
- Height: 1.86 m (6 ft 1 in)
- Position: Midfielder

Youth career
- Châteauroux

Senior career*
Years	Team	Apps	(Gls)
1997–1998	Châteauroux	29	(1)
1998–1999	Lens	25	(3)
1999–2000	Marseille	29	(1)
2000–2001	Paris Saint-Germain	19	(1)
2001–2005	Inter Milan	48	(3)
2003–2004	→ Tottenham Hotspur (loan)	22	(3)
2004–2005	→ Toulouse (loan)	19	(1)
2005–2006	Racing Santander	16	(1)
2006–2007	Bordeaux	13	(0)
2007–2010	Sochaux	91	(8)
2010–2012	Rennes	37	(2)
2012–2013	Nîmes	0	(0)
Total		348	(24)
- * Club domestic league appearances and goals

Stéphane Dalmat (born 16 February 1979) is a French former professional footballer who played as a midfielder.

== Club career ==
Dalmat was born in Joué-lès-Tours. His first professional match was for Châteauroux against Cannes, which was lost 2–1 on 30 August 1997. He performed well with Châteauroux, and soon a big change was to happen.

He was snapped up by Lens in 1998–99, playing as an attacking central midfielder and earned favourable comparisons to Zinedine Zidane. He quickly moved on to Marseille but, after a dodgy season for the team – where he was often used out of position at left back by a coach he did not get on with, he moved on to Paris Saint-Germain. There he formed a midfield alongside Ali Benarbia and Laurent Robert. After a new coach was installed Dalmat found himself being moved on to Inter Milan.

Two-and-a-half seasons of frustration at Inter, during which time he never succeeded in securing an extended run in the team, were followed by a loan move to Tottenham Hotspur for the rest of the 2003–04 season, for what looked like an ideal replacement for Christian Ziege. The playmaker's fortunes did not get much better at White Hart Lane where, despite winning over the Spurs fans with some dynamic performances, he did not win over the confidence of then Coach David Pleat.

His debut for Spurs came on 13 September 2003 as a substitute in a 4–2 defeat at Chelsea. However, he suffered with injuries for most of the season. The highlight of his spell at Spurs was scoring a brace in the 4–1 win over Birmingham in January 2004. He scored one other league goal for Spurs, in the 5–2 win over Wolves in December 2003.

Dalmat's performances in the first three months of the 2003–04 season impressed many but off the field his attitude convinced Tottenham not to make his move permanent.

On his arrival at Toulouse in the summer of 2004, the midfielder declared his reasons behind the switch: “Playing for Toulouse will be a beautiful adventure from both a human and sporting point of view.”

Relief at rediscovering the sort of form that attracted Inter three years ago disappeared in October 2004, when he fractured a bone in his foot in a friendly match against Nantes. Just days before the injury, Toulouse defender Lucien Aubey had said prophetically: “Some of the players are exhausted because we’ve been playing a match every three days. A guy like Dalmat, who hasn’t played much in recent months, must find it especially hard.”

Dalmat returned to play in the last few months of the season, but Toulouse's bid to seal a European finish had floundered in the absence of Dalmat and Moreira, both of whom missed a large portion of the season through injury.

On 13 July 2005, Racing de Santander announced the signing of Dalmat, on a free transfer signing a five-year deal. Santander followed up his capture with that of his brother Wilfried, who followed Stéphane to El Sardinero, penning a season-long deal.

However, the French midfielder did not have the expected impact at Racing many hoped. The brothers sustained criticism from president Manuel Huerta after returning from their Christmas holidays four days late. The attack on their attitudes appeared to have hastened their exit from the La Liga outfit, but neither were sold by the club during the January 2006 transfer window.

On 14 August 2006 Dalmat returned to France signing for Bordeaux on a free transfer. Stéphane Dalmat has since moved again on another free transfer to Sochaux in July 2007.

On 6 July 2012, Dalmat moved to Ligue 2 side Nîmes from Rennes where he played two seasons, but on 24 July, he announced that he is unable to continue as a player.

== International career ==
At international level, Dalmat was capped by the France under-21 national team.

== Honours ==
Lens

- Coupe de la Ligue: 1998–99
