= Jimmy Algerino =

French footballer (born 1971)

Personal information
- Date of birth: 28 October 1971 (age 55)
- Place of birth: Toulouse, France
- Position: Defender

Senior career*
Years	Team	Apps	(Gls)
1990–1991	Chamois Niortais	15	(0)
1991–1992	Monaco	3	(0)
1992–1993	SAS Épinal	33	(1)
1993–1996	Châteauroux	104	(4)
1996–2001	Paris Saint-Germain	128	(7)
2001	Venezia	8	(0)
2001–2002	Sochaux	11	(0)
2002–2004	Châteauroux	32	(2)
2004–2005	Legnano	4	(0)
Total		338	(14)
- * Club domestic league appearances and goals

Jimmy Algerino (born 28 October 1971) is a French former professional footballer who played as a defender.

Born into a family of Italian immigrants in Toulouse, Algerino grew up in the Empalot district, next to the Stadium Municipal.

He most notably played for Paris Saint-Germain for five seasons followed by a short spell in Italy at S.S.C. Venezia.

== Titles ==
- European Supercup: 1996 runner-up
- UEFA Cup Winners' Cup Final 1997 runner-up
- Coupe de France: 1998
- Coupe de la Ligue: 1998
- Trophée des Champions: 1998
- Coupe de France: 2004 runner-up
