= Cédric Pardeilhan =

French footballer (born 1976)

Personal information
- Full name: Cédric Pardeilhan
- Date of birth: 4 May 1976 (age 50)
- Place of birth: Pau, France
- Height: 1.82 m (5 ft 11 1/2 in)
- Position: Defender

Senior career*
Years	Team	Apps	(Gls)
1993–1995	Pau	22	(1)
1995–1996	Paris Saint-Germain	1	(0)
1996–1997	Toulouse	2	(0)
1997–1998	Le Mans	23	(0)
1998–1999	Gazélec Ajaccio	27	(0)
1999–2000	Chamois Niortais	26	(0)
2001–2003	Beauvais	43	(1)
2003–2008	Bayonne	74	(5)
- * Club domestic league appearances and goals

Cédric Pardeilhan (born 4 May 1976) is a coach and former footballer who played as a defender. He currently coaches Genêts Anglet.
