= Soufiane Koné =

French footballer (born 1980)

Soufiane Koné (born 8 June 1980) is a French footballer.

Koné was born in Toulouse, France, on 8 June 1980.

He played as a forward, participating in 32 matches and scoring 6 goals for AS Nancy in Ligue 1 between 1998 and 2000, and in two matches for AS Cannes in 2003–4.
