= Pierre Ducrocq =

French footballer (born 1976)

Personal information
- Date of birth: 18 December 1976 (age 49)
- Place of birth: Pontoise, France
- Height: 1.79 m (5 ft 10 in)
- Positions: Defender; midfielder

Youth career
- 1992–1994: Paris Saint-Germain

Senior career*
Years	Team	Apps	(Gls)
1994–2002	Paris Saint-Germain	104	(2)
1996–1997	→ Laval (loan)	35	(1)
2001–2002	→ Derby County (loan)	19	(0)
2002–2007	Le Havre	160	(0)
2007–2009	Strasbourg	45	(0)
2009–2011	Kavala	49	(0)
Total		412	(3)

International career
- France U16
- * Club domestic league appearances and goals

Pierre Ducrocq (born 18 December 1976) is a French former professional footballer who played as a defender or midfielder.

== Club career ==
Born in Pontoise, Ducrocq started his career at Paris Saint-Germain, progressing through the youth ranks and making his debut in the 1994–95 season. He was loaned to Stade Lavallois during the 1996–97 season, later becoming a regular for the first team after returning.

He was loaned to Derby County in October 2001, with a view to a permanent deal. However, the club would not be able to purchase the player after being relegated from the Premier League and Ducrocq returned to PSG, signing for Ligue 1 newcomers Le Havre where his friend and former teammate Grégory Paisley was playing. Despite being relegated from the Ligue 1 in his first season, Ducrocq played for the club until 2007. Before the start of the 2007–08, he submitted a transfer request in order to seek an opportunity to play at the top flight again.

Ducrocq first travelled to Israeli club Maccabi Tel Aviv, but the move was cancelled after manager Eli Cohen left the club. He then went to Turkish side Bursaspor, but rejected a move after being told that there were staff disagreements at the club. Ultimately, he joined his friend Grégory Paisley again in a two-year contract move to Strasbourg, suffering relegation at the 2007–08 Ligue 1 and losing a promotion spot in the last match of the 2008–09 Ligue 2 after a defeat against Montpellier and a Boulogne victory in another match, falling from second to fourth place.

He signed with Greek club Kavala, finishing 6th in his first Super League Greece season and 7th in the 2010–11 before the club was relegated after found guilty of match-fixing. Ducrocq suffered an herniated disc near the end of the season and decided to quit football.

== International career ==
Ducrocq played for the France national under-16 football team at the 1993 UEFA European Under-16 Championship.

== Honours ==
Paris Saint-Germain

- Trophée des Champions: 1995, 1998
- Coupe de la Ligue: 1997–98
- Coupe de France: 1997–98
- UEFA Intertoto Cup: 2001
