= Reynald Pedros =

French football manager (born 1971)

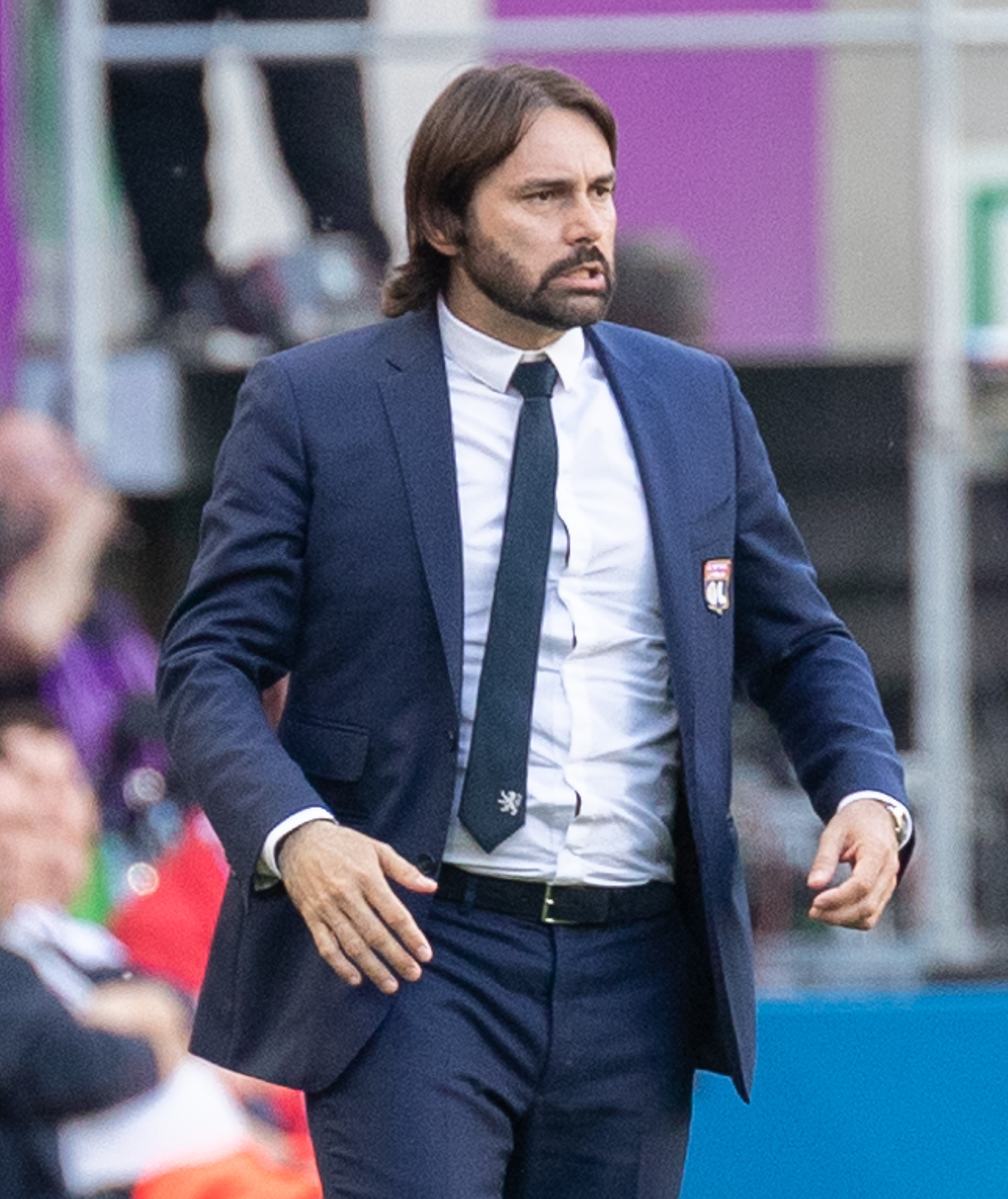
- Pedros as manager of Lyon Women in 2019

Personal information
- Full name: Reynald Michel Sebastian Pedros
- Date of birth: 10 October 1971 (age 55)
- Place of birth: Orléans, France
- Height: 1.72 m (5 ft 8 in)
- Position: Attacking midfielder

Senior career*
Years	Team	Apps	(Gls)
1987–1992	Nantes B	70	(11)
1990–1996	Nantes	152	(22)
1996	Marseille	23	(0)
1997	Parma	4	(0)
1997	Napoli	3	(0)
1997–1998	Lyon	15	(2)
1998–1999	Parma	1	(0)
1999–2000	Montpellier	3	(0)
1999–2000	Montpellier B	4	(1)
2000–2001	Toulouse	8	(1)
2001–2003	Bastia	15	(0)
2001–2002	Bastia B	7	(0)
2004–2005	Al-Khor		
2005–2006	Sud Nivernais Imphy Decize		
2006–2007	Bouchemaine La Baule-Escoublac		
2007–2009	Baulmes	12	(1)
Total		317	(38)

International career
1993–1996	France	25	(4)

Managerial career
- 2008–2009: St-Jean-Ruelle
- 2009–2012: St-Pryvé St-Hilaire
- 2015–2017: Orléans (president adviser)
- 2017–2019: Lyon Women
- 2021–2023: Morocco Women
- 2025–: Ivory Coast Women
- * Club domestic league appearances and goals

Reynald Michel Sebastian Pedros (born 10 October 1971) is a French professional football manager and former player who played as a midfielder, who currently serves as the head coach of the Ivory Coast women's national team.

== Early life and club career ==
Reynald Michel Sebastian Pedros was born on 10 October 1971 in Orléans, Loiret, and is of Portuguese and Spanish descent. He played as a left-footed attacking midfielder, formed in Nantes. He was part of the magic trio of FC Nantes with Patrice Loko and Nicolas Ouédec. He won the Division 1 title with Nantes in 1995. The following year he reached the semi-finals of the UEFA Champions League.

== International career ==
Pedros played for the France national team. His career bears some similarity to David Ginola's – a mistake in the last 1994 FIFA World Cup qualifying match leading to French elimination, and subsequently being dropped from the national team.

Before UEFA Euro 1996, he was considered one of the best French midfielders, on par with Zinedine Zidane, and was selected for the tournament. France reached the semi-final to face the Czech Republic, and the two teams could not be separated over ninety minutes. The match thus went into extra time and subsequently a penalty shoot-out. After five successful penalties for each team, Pedros was to take the first of the penalties in sudden death. His shot was weak and slow, and was easily saved by the Czech goalkeeper, Petr Kouba. Miroslav Kadlec came to take the next penalty, scored it, and knocked France out of the tournament.

Following this elimination, Pedros was made a pariah by the media and was greatly disliked by French fans. He attempted to make a comeback, in Ligue 2, but he was never able to come back to the top of his game.

== Managerial career ==
Pedros worked as president adviser at Orléans for two years. On 2 June 2017, he took over as head coach of Olympique Lyonnais Féminin. He led them to retain the Division 1 Féminine championship for the 12th and 13th time. He also succeeded in guiding the team to retaining the UEFA Women's Champions League for the 3rd and 4th time.

In November 2020, Pedros became the coach of the Moroccan women's national team. This recruitment took place in the context of the effort made by the FRMF and its President Fouzi Lekjaa to develop women's football in Morocco, particularly mass football, with the aim of becoming a stronghold of women's football at continental and world level. His first tournament was the 2022 Women's Africa Cup of Nations, at which he guided Morocco to reach the final of the WAFCON for the first time in its only third appearance. This included a win on penalties win over African powerhouse Nigeria in the semi-finals, which was seen as a redemption for his penalty defeat in Euro 1996.

In August 2023, he took Morocco women's team to the knockout stages of the 2023 FIFA Women's World Cup on their debut appearance at the tournament.

In January 2025, Pedros became the head coach of the Ivory Coast women's national team. Pedros' side originally failed to qualify for the 2026 Women's Africa Cup of Nations (WAFCON), losing to Senegal on penalties after their two-legged tie ended goalless. They were later granted admission due to having a higher FIFA ranking as the tournament was expanded after the qualification cycle had concluded, marking their first qualification for WAFCON since 2014.

== Career statistics ==
=== International goals ===
Scores and results list France's goal tally first, score column indicates score after each Pedros goal.

List of international goals scored by Reynald Pedros
No.	Date	Venue	Opponent	Score	Result	Competition	Ref.
1	6 September 1995	Stade de l'Abbé-Deschamps, Auxerre, France	Azerbaijan	4–0	10–0	UEFA Euro 1996 qualifying	
2	24 January 1996	Parc des Princes, Paris, France	Portugal	3–2	3–2	Friendly	
3	29 May 1996	Stade de la Meinau, Strasbourg, France	Finland	2–0	2–0	Friendly	
4	9 October 1996	Parc des Princes, Paris, France	Turkey	2–0	4–0	Friendly	

== Honours ==
=== Manager ===
Lyon

- Division 1 Féminine: 2017–18, 2018–19
- Coupe de France Féminine: 2018–19
- UEFA Women's Champions League: 2018–19, 2019–20

Morocco

- Women's Africa Cup of Nations runner-up: 2022
