= Ali Benarbia =

Algerian footballer (born 1968)

Personal information
- Full name: Ali Benarbia
- Date of birth: 8 October 1968 (age 58)
- Place of birth: Oran, Algeria
- Height: 1.71 m (5 ft 7 in)
- Position: Midfielder

Senior career*
Years	Team	Apps	(Gls)
1985–1995	Martigues	201	(23)
1995–1998	Monaco	90	(8)
1998–1999	Bordeaux	25	(3)
1999–2001	Paris Saint-Germain	42	(0)
2001–2003	Manchester City	71	(11)
2003–2005	Al-Rayyan	19	(8)
2005–2006	Qatar SC	6	(1)
Total		454	(54)

International career
2000–2001	Algeria	7	(0)
- * Club domestic league appearances and goals

Ali Benarbia (Arabic: علي بن عربية; born 8 October 1968) is an Algerian former professional footballer who played as a midfielder. He is a TV presenter for Al Jazeera Sports in Doha.

As a player he was a midfielder who notably spent time playing in Ligue 1 and the Premier League between 1995 and 2003 playing with Monaco, Bordeaux, Paris Saint-Germain and Manchester City. He also had spells with Martigues, Al-Rayyan and Qatar SC. He was capped seven times by Algeria between 2000 and 2001.

Benarbia is fondly remembered for his time at Manchester City and was nicknamed "The Algerian Magician".

== Early life ==
Ali Benarbia was born in Oran, Algeria, with his family originating from Sidi Bel Abbès. When he was only a year old, the family settled in south of France. It was not long before the young Ali started kicking a ball around on the streets.

== Club career ==
Benarbia grabbed the attention of district side ROC Narbonne at only 10 years and seven years later he signed for FC Martigues. Encouraged by his father, Benarbia wanted to have a professional career in the game but knew that it would only come through hard-work. Playing in the youth team, Benarbia was quickly promoted to the first team in 1987 and went on to help the club into the French first division after winning the second division title in 1993. He was part of the side that was promoted to Ligue 1 in 1993, operating as a midfielder.

=== Monaco ===
After Martigues were relegated in 1995, Benarbia was signed by AS Monaco and two seasons later he helped the club to a league title. In season 1997–98, he was named Player of the Year in the France but still no call came from the French coach. Bénarbia had turned down several offers to play for his home country of Algeria, as he had always hoped to play for France. Benarbia also played in Jean Tigana's talented Monaco side which famously put Manchester United out of the Champions League in 1998 on away goals after a 1–1 draw at Old Trafford.

=== Bordeaux ===
After three seasons with AS Monaco, Benarbia moved to Bordeaux for £1 million and helped the club, where Zinedine Zidane made his name, to the league title. With Benarbia playing the best football of his career, Paris Saint-Germain tabled an offer of £2 million for the Algerian player only a month before the end of the season. The club accepted but the deal was kept quiet until Bordeaux had clinched the title.

=== Paris Saint-Germain ===
Benarbia was named captain of the PSG side, which featured Nigerian Jay-Jay Okocha and later Nicolas Anelka. The team failed to win anything, though they did manage to qualify for the second round of the 2000–01 UEFA Champions League, finishing last in their group with Deportivo de La Coruña, Galatasaray S.K. and A.C. Milan.

=== Manchester City ===
Benarbia left France in 2001 and was signed on a free transfer by Manchester City, whose manager, Kevin Keegan he impressed whilst on trial. Keegan was urged to sign him by his assistant Arthur Cox, who recalled his performance for AS Monaco against Newcastle United after Keegan had resigned. He became a firm favourite amongst the supporters as City won the First Division and promotion back to the Premier League, winning the club's player of the year award and being named in the select side for the Division. He was made captain the following season, although he found the pace of the Premier League harder and was much less influential in his second season. He played his final game in a City shirt in 2003 against FC Barcelona in a game to mark the opening of the City of Manchester Stadium, before announcing his retirement.

=== Al-Rayyan ===
Only five days after this announcement, on 27 July 2003, Benarbia signed up to play for Al-Rayyan of Qatar. After two years with the club, he moved on to play for Nadi Qatar before announcing his retirement a year later.

== International career ==
Benarbia was first approached by the Algerian Football Federation in 1986. In a rare interview with Algerian website LeButeur published in 2009, Benarbia said that he never refused to play for Algeria. He stated that he was unhappy with the lack of professionalism within the national team and wanted the Federation to provide assurances for professional footballers' safety. During the time of Benarbia's playing career, Algeria struggled with political situations such as the 1986 oil price collapse, Black October and the Algerian Civil War.

He made his debut in a 2002 African Cup of Nations Group 4 qualifying game against Burkina Faso in September 2000. He represented Algeria a total of seven times, participating in; three World Cup qualifying games, two Africa Cup of Nations Cup qualifiers and two friendlies.

== Honours ==
FC Martigues

- Division 2: 1992–93

Monaco

- Division 1: 1996–97
- Trophée des Champions: 1997

Bordeaux

- Division 1: 1998–99

Paris Saint-Germain

- UEFA Intertoto Cup: 2001

Manchester City

- Football League First Division: 2001–02

Individual

- French Division 1 Player of the Year: 1998–99
- PFA Team of the Year: 2001–02 First Division
- Manchester City Player of the Year: 2001–02

Sporting positions
Preceded by Marco Simone	Paris Saint-Germain captain 1999–2000	Succeeded by Éric Rabésandratana
Preceded by Stuart Pearce	Manchester City captain 2002–2003	Succeeded by Sylvain Distin
