= Christophe Pignol =

French footballer (born 1969)

Personal information
- Date of birth: 15 October 1969 (age 57)
- Place of birth: Aubagne
- Position: Defender

Senior career*
Years	Team	Apps	(Gls)
1986–1991	Saint-Étienne II		
1987–1990	Saint-Étienne		
1991–1993	Istres		
1993–1997	Nantes		
1997–2000	Monaco		
2000–2001	Lille		
2001–2002	Lille II		
2002–2003	Andrézieux-Bouthéon		
- * Club domestic league appearances and goals

Christophe Pignol (born 15 October 1969) is a retired French football defender.

== Personal life ==
Born in France, Pignol is of Spanish descent. Pignol's younger brother, Stéphane Pignol was also a professional footballer and a defender.

== Honours ==
- Trophée des Champions: 1997
- Ligue 1: 1999–2000
