= Dominique Casagrande =

French footballer (born 1971)

Personal information
- Full name: Dominique Paul Antoine Casagrande
- Date of birth: 8 May 1971 (age 55)
- Place of birth: L'Union, Haute-Garonne, France
- Height: 1.89 m (6 ft 2 in)
- Position: Goalkeeper

Youth career
- 1993–1994: Muret

Senior career*
Years	Team	Apps	(Gls)
1994–1997	Nantes	51	(0)
1997–1998	Sevilla	31	(0)
1998–2001	Paris Saint-Germain	12	(0)
2001–2003	Saint-Étienne	48	(0)
2003–2004	Créteil	31	(0)
Total		173	(0)
- * Club domestic league appearances and goals

Dominique Paul Antoine Casagrande (born 8 May 1971) is a French former professional footballer who played as a goalkeeper.

== Honours ==
Paris Saint-Germain

- Trophée des Champions: 1998
