= Nicolas Ouédec =

French footballer (born 1971)

Personal information
- Full name: Nicolas Pierre Ouédec
- Date of birth: 28 October 1971 (age 55)
- Place of birth: Lorient, France
- Height: 1.80 m (5 ft 11 in)
- Position: Striker

Youth career
- 1980–1986: CS Queven
- 1986–1990: Nantes

Senior career*
Years	Team	Apps	(Gls)
1989–1996	Nantes	150	(63)
1996–1998	Espanyol	59	(17)
1998	Paris Saint-Germain	12	(0)
1999–2001	Montpellier	44	(7)
2001–2002	La Louvière	11	(3)
2002	Dalian Shide	20	(10)
2003–2004	Shandong Luneng	36	(9)
Total		332	(109)

International career
1992–1994	France U21	18	(11)
1994–1997	France	7	(1)
- * Club domestic league appearances and goals

Nicolas Pierre Ouédec (born 28 October 1971) is a retired French professional footballer who played as a striker.

== Club career ==
Born in Lorient, Morbihan, Ouédec was a product of FC Nantes's famous youth academy. He made his Division 1 debuts at the age of 17. He finished joint-top scorer in the 1993–94 season, netting 20 goals to help his team qualify for the UEFA Cup as fifth; he added a further 18 the following season, and the Canaries won the seventh national championship of their history.

After two solid campaigns at Spain's RCD Espanyol, Ouédec moved to Paris Saint-Germain, and from there his career never improved: two-and-a-half seasons at Montpellier HSC (where he reformed, with little impact, Nantes' attacking trio which also comprised Patrice Loko and Reynald Pedros) and one with Belgian club R.A.A. Louviéroise with only nine goals combined. He retired from football after representing two sides in China, aged 32.

== International career ==
A France international on seven occasions, Ouédec was, however, never selected for any major tournament's final stages. He earned his first cap on 29 May 1994, coming on as a 71st-minute substitute for Éric Di Meco in a 4–1 win against Japan for the Kirin Cup.

== Post-retirement ==
After retiring, Ouédec worked as a youth system coordinator at Nantes, also buying a hotel in the city. He later settled in the Philippines with his wife, where he was involved in the meat packing industry business.

== Honours ==
Nantes

- French Division 1: 1994–95

Paris Saint-Germain

- Trophée des Champions: 1998

Dalian Shide

- Chinese Jia-A League: 2002

Shandong Luneng

- Chinese FA Cup: 2004
