= 1998–99 French Division 1 =

61st season of French Division 1

Division 1
- Season: 1998–99
- Dates: 7 August 1998 – 29 May 1999
- Champions: Bordeaux (5th title)
- Relegated: Lorient; Sochaux; Toulouse
- Matches: 306
- Goals: 723 (2.36 per match)
- Best player: Ali Benarbia
- Top goalscorer: Sylvain Wiltord (22 goals)

The 1998–99 Ligue 1 season (then called Division 1) was the 61st since its establishment. FC Girondins de Bordeaux won the French Association Football League with 72 points.

== Participating teams ==
- AJ Auxerre
- SC Bastia
- FC Girondins de Bordeaux
- Le Havre AC
- RC Lens
- FC Lorient
- Olympique Lyonnais
- Olympique de Marseille
- FC Metz
- AS Monaco
- Montpellier HSC
- AS Nancy-Lorraine
- FC Nantes Atlantique
- Paris Saint-Germain
- Stade Rennais
- FC Sochaux-Montbéliard
- RC Strasbourg
- Toulouse FC
Location of teams in 1998–99 Division 1

== League table ==
Pos	Team	Pld	W	D	L	GF	GA	GD	Pts	Qualification or relegation
1	Bordeaux (C)	34	22	6	6	66	29	+37	72	Qualification to Champions League first group stage
2	Marseille	34	21	8	5	56	28	+28	71	Qualification to Champions League first group stage
3	Lyon	34	18	9	7	51	31	+20	63	Qualification to Champions League third qualifying round
4	Monaco	34	18	8	8	52	32	+20	62	Qualification to UEFA Cup first round
5	Rennes	34	17	8	9	45	38	+7	59	Qualification to Intertoto Cup third round
6	Lens	34	14	7	13	46	43	+3	49	Qualification to UEFA Cup first round (Note: Lens was qualified for the 1999–2000 UEFA Cup as winners of the 1998–99 Coupe de la Ligue. Also, Nantes was qualified for the 1999–2000 UEFA Cup as winners of the 1998–99 Coupe de France.)
7	Nantes	34	12	12	10	40	34	+6	48	Qualification to UEFA Cup first round
8	Montpellier	34	11	10	13	53	50	+3	43	Qualification to Intertoto Cup second round
9	Paris Saint-Germain	34	10	9	15	34	35	−1	39	
10	Metz	34	9	12	13	28	37	−9	39	Qualification to Intertoto Cup second round
11	Nancy	34	10	9	15	35	45	−10	39	
12	Strasbourg	34	8	14	12	30	36	−6	38	
13	Bastia	34	10	8	16	37	46	−9	38	
14	Auxerre	34	9	10	15	40	45	−5	37	
15	Le Havre	34	8	11	15	23	38	−15	35	
16	Lorient (R)	34	8	11	15	33	49	−16	35	Relegation to French Division 2
17	Sochaux (R)	34	6	15	13	30	54	−24	33	Relegation to French Division 2
18	Toulouse (R)	34	6	11	17	24	53	−29	29	Relegation to French Division 2

Source: Ligue 1
Rules for classification: 1) points; 2) goal difference; 3) number of goals scored.
(C) Champions; (R) Relegated
Notes:

Promoted from Ligue 2, who will play in Division 1 season 1999/2000

- AS Saint-Étienne: champion of Ligue 2
- CS Sedan-Ardennes: runners-up
- Troyes AC: third place

== Results ==
Home \ Away	AUX	BAS	BOR	LHA	RCL	LOR	OL	OM	MET	ASM	MHS	NNC	FCN	PSG	REN	SOC	RCS	TFC
Auxerre		1–0	3–1	0–0	1–2	5–0	1–0	1–1	1–0	0–3	2–2	3–2	1–1	0–1	2–0	3–1	3–1	1–2
Bastia	2–0		2–0	2–0	1–1	2–1	4–1	0–2	3–0	3–1	2–2	1–2	1–0	2–0	0–1	1–1	0–0	1–1
Bordeaux	1–0	2–0		3–0	1–0	0–0	1–0	4–1	6–0	0–1	3–1	2–0	2–0	3–1	4–0	0–0	1–0	3–1
Le Havre	2–1	1–1	2–3		3–1	0–1	1–0	0–0	0–0	1–2	1–1	1–1	2–1	0–4	2–0	3–0	0–1	0–0
Lens	2–2	1–0	2–4	0–1		1–1	0–3	4–0	2–0	1–1	1–0	2–1	2–4	2–1	3–1	1–1	3–0	3–1
Lorient	1–1	3–1	0–2	0–0	1–1		0–1	1–3	1–1	1–2	1–1	0–1	1–1	2–0	1–1	4–1	0–1	1–0
Lyon	2–1	2–1	2–1	0–0	3–1	2–2		2–1	2–0	1–1	2–0	2–1	2–1	1–1	1–2	4–1	3–2	6–1
Marseille	1–0	3–1	2–2	2–0	1–0	4–1	0–0		3–0	1–0	5–4	4–0	2–0	0–0	1–1	4–0	1–0	2–0
Metz	2–0	4–0	0–2	1–0	0–1	3–0	3–2	0–1		1–0	3–1	2–3	1–0	1–1	0–0	1–1	1–0	0–0
Monaco	3–2	1–1	0–2	3–0	2–0	1–0	0–1	1–2	0–0		2–0	3–0	3–1	2–1	4–2	4–1	2–1	1–1
Montpellier	3–0	3–0	1–1	2–0	1–0	5–1	1–3	0–1	1–1	2–3		1–1	1–2	2–1	4–2	0–0	1–1	3–0
Nancy	1–1	1–2	2–3	1–0	0–1	2–0	0–0	2–3	1–0	1–2	0–1		1–0	0–0	0–1	1–1	1–1	2–0
Nantes	2–2	2–0	0–0	1–1	2–0	1–1	2–0	0–1	0–0	0–1	1–1	2–0		0–0	2–1	2–0	1–0	2–0
Paris SG	2–0	2–0	2–3	3–0	0–1	1–2	0–1	2–1	2–2	1–0	0–1	1–2	0–0		2–1	2–1	0–0	0–0
Rennes	1–0	2–0	1–1	2–1	2–0	1–0	0–0	1–1	1–0	2–1	3–2	2–1	2–3	2–1		4–0	1–1	1–0
Sochaux	1–1	2–1	2–0	1–0	0–4	0–1	1–2	0–0	1–1	1–1	4–0	1–1	1–1	1–0	0–3		1–1	2–1
Strasbourg	2–1	1–1	3–2	0–1	1–1	2–0	0–0	0–2	0–0	1–1	2–1	1–2	2–2	0–1	1–1	1–1		2–0
Toulouse	0–0	2–1	0–3	0–0	3–2	1–4	0–0	1–0	1–0	0–0	2–5	1–1	2–3	2–1	0–1	1–1	0–1	

Source: Ligue 1
Legend: Blue = home team win; Yellow = draw; Red = away team win.

== Top goalscorers ==
Rank	Player	Club	Goals
1	(France) Sylvain Wiltord	Bordeaux	22
2	(France) Alain Caveglia	Lyon	17
3	(France) Lilian Laslandes	Bordeaux	15
3	(Democratic Republic of the Congo) Shabani Nonda	Rennes	15
5	(France) Florian Maurice	Marseille	14
6	(Italy) Fabrizio Ravanelli	Marseille	13
7	(France) David Trezeguet	AS Monaco	12
7	(Republic of Ireland) Tony Cascarino	Nancy	12
9	(France) Frédéric Née	Bastia	11
9	(Nigeria) Victor Ikpeba	Monaco	11
9	(France) Laurent Robert	Montpellier	11
9	(France) Bruno Rodriguez	Metz (6); Paris Saint-Germain (5)	11

== Awards ==
=== Individual awards ===
Award	Winner	Club
Ligue 1 Player of the Year	(Algeria) Ali Benarbia	Bordeaux
Ligue 1 Young Player of the Year	(France) Olivier Monterrubio	Nantes
Ligue 1 Manager of the Year	(France) Élie Baup	Bordeaux

Team of the Year
Goalkeeper	(France) Fabien Barthez (Monaco)			
Defenders	(France) Patrice Carteron (Lyon)	(France) Laurent Blanc (Marseille)	(Argentina) Néstor Fabbri (Nantes)	(France) Manuel Dos Santos (Montpellier)
Midfielders	(Algeria) Ali Benarbia (Bordeaux)	(France) Michel Pavon (Bordeaux)	(France) Johan Micoud (Bordeaux)	(France) Vikash Dhorasoo (Lyon)
Forwards	(France) Lilian Laslandes (Bordeaux)	(France) Sylvain Wiltord (Bordeaux)		

== Attendances ==
No.	Club	Average attendance	Change
1	Paris Saint-Germain FC	35,582	-4.7%
2	RC Lens	22,977	-9.9%
3	FC Nantes	22,372	-8.6%
4	Olympique lyonnais	21,624	-2.8%
5	Girondins de Bordeaux	20,249	37.2%
6	Olympique de Marseille	17,862	-0.5%
7	RC Strasbourg	17,341	13.1%
8	SM Caen	15,893	24.7%
9	FC Metz	14,701	-8.1%
10	Stade rennais	13,177	1.1%
11	Le Havre AC	10,586	10.4%
12	AJ auxerroise	10,503	-4.6%
13	LOSC	10,347	19.3%
14	MHSC	10,125	2.0%
15	AS Nancy	9,239	29.7%
16	EA Guingamp	8,434	-26.6%
17	AS Saint-Étienne	8,061	-41.4%
18	AS Monaco	7,103	12.6%
19	SC Bastia	5,415	12.4%
20	OGC Nice	5,024	-7.5%
