= 1994–95 French Division 1 =

57th season of French Division 1

Division 1
- Season: 1994–95
- Dates: 28 July 1994 – 31 May 1995
- Champions: Nantes (7th title)
- Relegated: Caen; Sochaux
- Champions League: Nantes
- Cup Winners' Cup: Paris Saint-Germain
- UEFA Cup: Bordeaux; Monaco; Lens; Strasbourg; Lyon; Auxerre
- Matches: 380
- Goals: 951 (2.5 per match)
- Best Player: Vincent Guérin
- Top goalscorer: Patrice Loko (22 goals)

FC Nantes won Division 1 season 1994/1995 of the French Association Football League with 79 points and only one defeat.

== Participating teams ==
- Auxerre
- SC Bastia
- Bordeaux
- SM Caen
- AS Cannes
- Le Havre AC
- Lens
- Lille
- Olympique Lyonnais
- FC Martigues
- FC Metz
- AS Monaco
- Montpellier HSC
- FC Nantes Atlantique
- OGC Nice
- Paris Saint-Germain FC
- Stade Rennais FC
- AS Saint-Etienne
- FC Sochaux-Montbéliard
- RC Strasbourg
Location of teams in 1994–95 Division 1

== League table ==
Pos	Team	Pld	W	D	L	GF	GA	GD	Pts	Qualification or relegation
1	Nantes (C)	38	21	16	1	71	34	+37	79	Qualification to Champions League group stage
2	Lyon	38	19	12	7	56	38	+18	69	Qualification to UEFA Cup first round
3	Paris Saint-Germain	38	20	7	11	58	41	+17	67	Qualification to Cup Winners' Cup first round (Note: Paris Saint-Germain qualified for the 1995–96 UEFA Cup Winners' Cup as winners of the 1994–95 Coupe de France and 1994–95 Coupe de la Ligue.)
4	Auxerre	38	15	17	6	59	34	+25	62	Qualification to UEFA Cup first round
5	Lens	38	15	14	9	48	44	+4	59	Qualification to UEFA Cup first round
6	Monaco	38	15	12	11	60	39	+21	57	Qualification to UEFA Cup first round
7	Bordeaux	38	16	9	13	52	47	+5	57	Qualification to Intertoto Cup group stage
8	Metz	38	16	8	14	50	44	+6	56	Qualification to Intertoto Cup group stage
9	Cannes	38	15	8	15	56	48	+8	53	Qualification to Intertoto Cup group stage
10	Strasbourg	38	13	12	13	43	43	0	51	Qualification to Intertoto Cup group stage
11	Martigues	38	13	12	13	37	49	−12	51	
12	Le Havre	38	12	13	13	46	49	−3	49	
13	Rennes	38	12	12	14	53	55	−2	48	
14	Lille	38	13	9	16	29	44	−15	48	
15	Bastia	38	11	11	16	44	56	−12	44	
16	Nice	38	11	10	17	39	52	−13	43	
17	Montpellier	38	9	14	15	38	53	−15	41	
18	Saint-Étienne	38	9	11	18	45	55	−10	38	Reprived from relegation (Note: Saint-Étienne were reprived from relegation due to Marseille's denied promotion from Division 2.)
19	Caen (R)	38	10	6	22	38	58	−20	36	Relegation to French Division 2
20	Sochaux (R)	38	6	5	27	29	68	−39	23	Relegation to French Division 2

Source: Ligue 1
Rules for classification: 1) points; 2) goal difference; 3) number of goals scored.
(C) Champions; (R) Relegated
Notes:

Promoted from Ligue 2, who will play in Division 1 season 1995/1996

- Olympique Marseille : champion of Ligue 2: Due to financial problems, Olympique Marseille remains in Ligue 2, AS Saint-Etienne is not relegated even though they finished 18th.
- EA Guingamp : runners-up
- FC Gueugnon : third place

== Results ==
Home \ Away	AUX	BAS	BOR	CAE	CAN	LHA	RCL	LIL	OL	MAR	MET	ASM	MHS	FCN	NIC	PSG	REN	STE	SOC	RCS
Auxerre		2–1	1–0	1–1	3–0	1–1	3–0	2–0	0–0	3–0	1–1	2–2	0–1	1–2	3–0	1–1	2–2	3–0	4–0	1–0
Bastia	0–1		0–0	1–0	6–3	3–2	1–3	3–1	0–1	2–0	0–3	0–2	1–1	2–2	1–1	1–2	1–2	2–1	1–0	0–1
Bordeaux	3–1	1–0		2–0	0–2	0–1	1–2	1–0	1–1	1–1	4–2	0–3	2–0	1–1	1–0	3–0	2–1	2–1	2–1	2–0
Caen	1–5	2–1	4–2		0–1	2–2	0–0	2–0	0–1	0–1	2–0	0–1	1–0	0–2	0–0	1–2	5–1	3–0	3–1	4–0
Cannes	3–1	0–0	2–0	1–0		2–2	2–0	0–0	5–1	0–1	1–0	2–2	3–0	0–1	2–0	3–2	0–1	4–1	0–0	2–2
Le Havre	1–4	2–2	1–1	1–1	1–0		2–3	0–1	2–0	1–0	0–3	1–0	1–2	0–0	1–1	0–0	4–0	2–0	2–0	1–0
Lens	1–1	3–0	2–1	2–0	0–2	1–1		1–1	4–0	2–1	2–2	0–0	1–1	1–1	2–1	1–2	5–0	0–0	1–0	1–0
Lille	0–0	3–0	1–0	1–1	0–3	1–1	3–1		1–4	1–0	1–0	1–0	0–0	1–2	1–0	1–0	1–0	1–0	1–0	1–0
Lyon	3–0	0–0	1–1	1–0	3–1	2–0	1–1	3–1		3–0	1–0	3–1	2–1	1–1	1–1	2–0	3–0	1–0	4–0	1–0
Martigues	2–1	5–2	1–0	4–1	0–0	2–1	0–0	1–0	2–0		1–1	1–1	2–1	3–3	0–1	1–1	1–0	1–1	2–0	0–0
Metz	1–1	1–2	2–3	4–0	3–2	2–1	3–1	1–1	2–1	0–0		2–0	0–0	0–2	0–0	2–0	1–0	1–0	3–0	3–2
Monaco	0–0	2–1	6–3	3–0	0–0	1–2	6–0	2–0	1–1	1–0	0–1		2–0	2–2	0–2	2–1	0–0	0–0	3–1	3–1
Montpellier	1–1	0–0	0–1	3–2	5–3	2–1	1–2	1–0	2–2	0–1	2–0	2–2		2–2	0–0	0–3	0–1	3–2	1–0	1–1
Nantes	0–0	0–0	3–3	2–1	2–1	3–2	3–0	3–0	1–1	3–0	3–1	3–3	3–2		2–1	1–0	2–0	3–0	2–0	3–0
Nice	1–3	1–2	0–2	0–1	2–1	0–2	1–1	1–0	1–2	1–1	1–0	3–1	0–0	1–3		0–4	1–0	3–0	1–0	3–4
Paris SG	1–1	3–0	0–0	2–0	2–1	2–2	1–0	3–0	4–1	3–0	3–0	1–0	3–1	0–3	2–3		2–1	1–0	1–1	1–0
Rennes	2–2	2–2	2–0	5–0	3–1	0–0	0–1	1–0	1–1	5–1	1–2	1–3	2–2	1–1	3–1	4–0		2–2	2–1	1–1
Saint-Étienne	1–1	1–2	2–1	2–0	1–0	4–1	1–2	3–3	1–1	3–0	0–1	1–0	4–0	1–1	3–3	1–3	1–1		4–0	2–0
Sochaux	0–1	1–3	1–4	2–0	2–1	0–1	1–1	3–0	1–2	1–1	4–2	0–5	2–0	0–0	0–1	1–2	1–3	2–0		0–1
Strasbourg	1–1	1–1	1–1	1–0	1–2	3–0	0–0	1–1	1–0	5–0	1–0	1–0	0–0	2–0	3–2	2–0	2–2	1–1	3–2	

Source: Ligue 1
Legend: Blue = home team win; Yellow = draw; Red = away team win.

== Top goalscorers ==
Rank	Player	Club	Goals
1	(France) Patrice Loko	Nantes	22
2	(France) Alain Caveglia	Le Havre	20
3	(France) Nicolas Ouedec	Nantes	18
4	(France) Florian Maurice	Lyon	15
4	(Switzerland) Marco Grassi	Rennes	15
6	(Ivory Coast) Joël Tiéhi	Lens	14
6	(France) Youri Djorkaeff	Monaco	14
8	(Croatia) Ardian Kozniku	Cannes	13
8	(France) Didier Tholot	Martigues	13
8	(France) Laurent Blanc	Saint-Étienne	13

== Attendances ==
#	Club	Average
1	PSG	34,700
2	Lens	27,461
3	Nantes	24,337
4	Olympique lyonnais	21,438
5	Strasbourg	18,017
6	Caen	16,721
7	Saint-Étienne	15,932
8	Girondins	15,841
9	Stade rennais	11,706
10	Metz	10,101
11	AJA	9,591
12	MHSC	9,578
13	Le Havre	9,224
14	LOSC	7,756
15	Cannes	6,109
16	Monaco	5,950
17	Sochaux	5,012
18	Bastia	4,823
19	Nice	4,696
20	Martigues	4,135
