= Patrice Loko =

French footballer (born 1970)

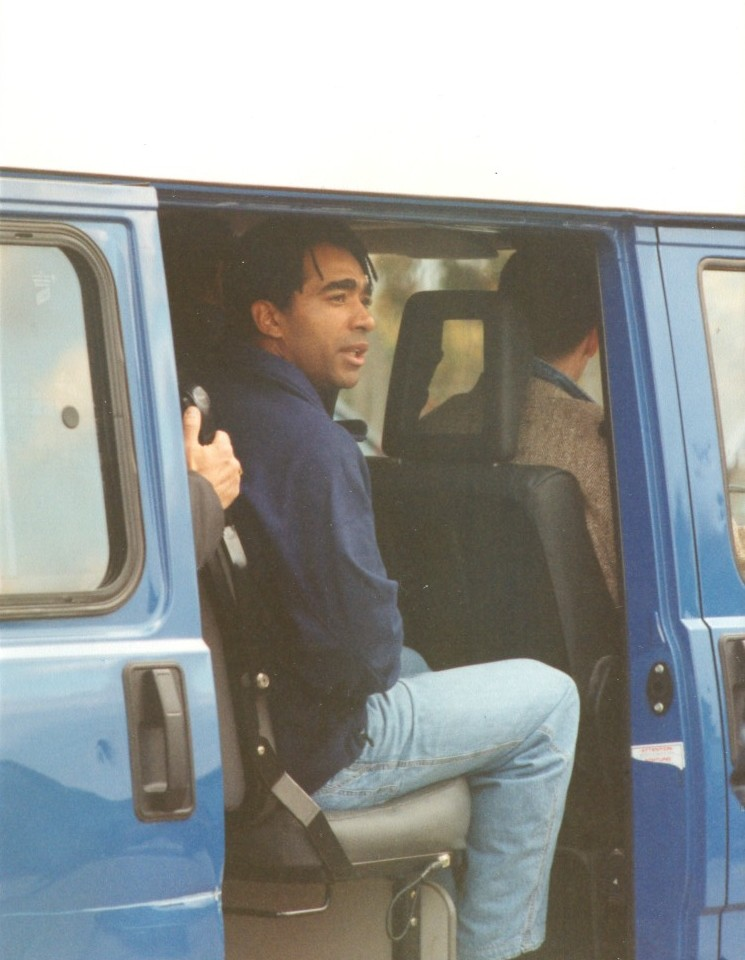
- Loko in 1996

Personal information
- Date of birth: 6 February 1970 (age 56)
- Place of birth: Sully-sur-Loire, France
- Height: 1.78 m (5 ft 10 in)
- Position: Striker

Senior career*
Years	Team	Apps	(Gls)
1988–1995	Nantes	180	(41)
1995–1998	Paris Saint-Germain	84	(23)
1998–1999	Lorient	20	(9)
1999–2000	Montpellier	27	(8)
2001	Lyon	2	(0)
2001–2002	Troyes	27	(8)
2002–2004	Lorient	48	(10)
2004	Ajaccio	13	(1)
Total		400	(100)

International career
1993–1997	France	26	(7)
- * Club domestic league appearances and goals

Patrice Loko (born 6 February 1970) is a French former professional footballer who played as a striker.

== Career ==
Loko began his career at Nantes and then moved on to Paris Saint-Germain, where he was part of the team that won the 1996 Cup Winners' Cup and lost to Barcelona in the 1997 Cup Winners' Cup final. From there he went on to play for Montpellier, Lyon, Troyes, Lorient and Ajaccio. He also made appearances for the France national team, including scoring at Euro 1996 against Bulgaria.

== Career statistics ==
Scores and results list France's goal tally first, score column indicates score after each Loko goal.

List of international goals scored by Patrice Loko
No.	Date	Venue	Opponent	Score	Result	Competition	Ref.
1	13 December 1994	Hüseyin Avni Aker Stadium, Trabzon, Turkey	Azerbaijan	2–0	2–0	Euro 1996 Q	
2	18 January 1995	Stadion Galgenwaard, Utrecht, Netherlands	Netherlands	1–0	1–0	Friendly	
3	21 February 1996	Stade des Costières, Nîmes, France	Greece	1–1	3–1	Friendly	
4	21 February 1996	Stade des Costières, Nîmes, France	Greece	2–1	3–1	Friendly	
5	29 May 1996	Stade de la Meinau, Strasbourg, France	Finland	1–0	2–0	Friendly	
6	18 June 1996	St James' Park, Newcastle upon Tyne, England	Bulgaria	3–1	3–1	UEFA Euro 1996	
7	26 February 1997	Parc des Princes, Paris, France	Netherlands	2–1	2–1	Friendly	

== Honours ==
Nantes

- Division 1: 1994–95

Paris Saint-Germain

- UEFA Cup Winners' Cup: 1995–96
- Coupe de France: 1997–98
- Coupe de la Ligue: 1997–98
- Trophée des Champions: 1998

Montpellier

- UEFA Intertoto Cup: 1999

Lyon

- Coupe de la Ligue: 2000–01

Troyes

- UEFA Intertoto Cup: 2001
