= 1997–98 Paris Saint-Germain FC season =

Paris Saint-Germain
1997–98 season
- President: Michel Denisot
- Head coach: Ricardo
- Stadium: Parc des Princes
- Division 1: 8th
- Coupe de France: Winners
- Coupe de la Ligue: Winners
- UEFA Champions League: Group stage
- Top goalscorer: League: Marco Simone (13); All: Marco Simone (22)
- Average home league attendance: 36,723
Home colours	Away colours	Third colours

The 1997–98 season was Paris Saint-Germain's 28th season in existence. PSG played their home league games at the Parc des Princes in Paris, registering an average attendance of 36,723 spectators per match. The club was presided by Michel Denisot and the team was coached by Ricardo. Raí was the team captain.

== Players ==
As of the 1997–98 season.

=== Squad ===
Note: Flags indicate national team as defined under FIFA eligibility rules; some limited exceptions apply. Players may hold more than one non-FIFA nationality.

No.	Pos.	Nation	Player
1	GK	FRA	Christophe Revault
2	MF	FRA	Bernard Allou
4	DF	FRA	Bruno Ngotty
5	DF	FRA	Alain Roche
6	DF	FRA	Paul Le Guen
7	FW	LBR	James Debbah
8	MF	FRA	Vincent Guérin
9	FW	ITA	Marco Simone
10	MF	BRA	Raí (captain)
11	FW	FRA	Patrice Loko
12	MF	ALB	Edvin Murati
13	MF	FRA	Laurent Fournier
14	DF	FRA	Francis Llacer
15	MF	FRA	Éric Rabésandratana

No.	Pos.	Nation	Player
16	GK	FRA	Vincent Fernandez
17	DF	FRA	Jimmy Algerino
18	FW	FRA	Florian Maurice
19	MF	FRA	Jérôme Leroy
20	MF	FRA	Franck Gava
21	MF	BRA	Edmilson
22	FW	YUG	Marko Pantelić
23	MF	FRA	Pierre Ducrocq
24	MF	FRA	Édouard Cissé
25	DF	FRA	Grégory Paisley
27	FW	FRA	Didier Martel
28	DF	FRA	Fabrice Kelban
29	DF	FRA	Didier Domi

== Competitions ==
=== Overall record ===
Competition	First match	Last match	Starting round	Final position	Record							
Competition	First match	Last match	Starting round	Final position	Pld	W	D	L	GF	GA	GD	Win %
Division 1	2 August 1997	31 May 1998	Matchday 1	8th	34	14	8	12	43	35	+8	41.18
Coupe de France	January 1998	2 May 1998	Round of 64	Winners	6	6	0	0	9	2	+7	100.00
Coupe de la Ligue	4 January 1998	4 April 1998	Round of 32	Winners	5	4	1	0	8	3	+5	80.00
UEFA Champions League	13 August 1997	10 December 1997	Second qualifying round	Group stage	8	5	0	3	16	13	+3	62.50
Total					53	29	9	15	76	53	+23	54.72

Source: Competitions

=== Division 1 ===
==== League table ====
Pos	Team	Pld	W	D	L	GF	GA	GD	Pts	Qualification or relegation
6	Lyon	34	16	5	13	39	37	+2	53	Qualification to UEFA Cup first round
7	Auxerre	34	14	9	11	55	45	+10	51	Qualification to Intertoto Cup third round
8	Paris Saint-Germain	34	14	8	12	43	35	+8	50	Qualification to Cup Winners' Cup first round (Note: Paris Saint-Germain qualified for the 1998–99 UEFA Cup Winners' Cup as winners of the 1997–98 Coupe de France and 1997–98 Coupe de la Ligue.)
9	Bastia	34	13	11	10	36	31	+5	50	Qualification to Intertoto Cup second round
10	Le Havre	34	10	14	10	38	35	+3	44	

Source: Ligue 1
Rules for classification: 1) points; 2) goal difference; 3) number of goals scored.

==== Results summary ====
Overall								Home						Away					
Pld	W	D	L	GF	GA	GD	Pts	W	D	L	GF	GA	GD	W	D	L	GF	GA	GD
34	14	8	12	43	35	+8	50	9	3	5	28	16	+12	5	5	7	15	19	−4

Source: Division 1

==== Results by round ====
Round	1	2	3	4	5	6	7	8	9	10	11	12	13	14	15	16	17	18	19	20	21	22	23	24	25	26	27	28	29	30	31	32	33	34
Ground	H	A	H	A	H	A	H	A	H	A	H	A	H	A	H	A	A	H	A	H	A	H	A	H	A	H	A	H	A	H	A	H	H	A
Result	W	W	W	L	W	W	W	D	D	D	W	W	W	L	L	D	L	W	W	D	W	W	L	L	L	L	D	D	L	W	D	L	L	L
Position	4	2	1	2	2	2	2	2	2	2	2	1	1	1	1	2	4	3	3	3	2	2	2	4	5	5	5	5	5	5	5	6	8	8

Source: Division 1
A = Away; H = Home; W = Win; D = Draw; L = Loss

==== Matches ====
2 August 1997 1	Paris Saint-Germain	2–0	Châteauroux	Paris
20:00 CEST (UTC+2)	Maurice 50'; Moulin 70' (o.g.)			Stadium: Parc des Princes; Attendance: 30,404; Referee: Jean-Marc Gonon

7 August 1997 2	Auxerre	2–3	Paris Saint-Germain	Auxerre
20:30 CEST (UTC+2)	Guivarc'h 29'; Marlet 43'		Simone 53'; Maurice 74'; Raí 88'	Stadium: Stade de l'Abbé Deschamps; Attendance: 20,000; Referee: Bernard Saules

16 August 1997 3	Paris Saint-Germain	3–1	Cannes	Paris
20:00 CEST (UTC+2)	Simone 10'; Gava 58'; Raí 89' (pen.)		Jensen 39' (pen.)	Stadium: Parc des Princes; Attendance: 27,956; Referee: Philippe Kalt

22 August 1997 4	Metz	2–1	Paris Saint-Germain	Metz
20:00 CEST (UTC+2)	Pirès 62' (pen.); Rodriguez 84'		Simone 90'	Stadium: Stade Saint-Symphorien; Attendance: 25,142; Referee: Claude Colombo

30 August 1997 5	Paris Saint-Germain	4–1	Rennes	Paris
20:00 CEST (UTC+2)	N'Gotty 34'; Simone 70', 74'; Le Guen 89'		Lambert 75'	Stadium: Parc des Princes; Attendance: 34,793; Referee: Serge Leon

5 September 1997 6	Strasbourg	0–3	Paris Saint-Germain	Strasbourg
20:30 CEST (UTC+2)			Raí 20' (pen.); Simone 80'; Maurice 86'	Stadium: Parc des Princes; Attendance: 26,250; Referee: Éric Poulat

12 September 1997 7	Paris Saint-Germain	2–0	Bastia	Paris
20:00 CEST (UTC+2)	Simone 37'; Maurice 87'			Stadium: Parc des Princes; Attendance: 40,000; Referee: Marc Batta

20 September 1997 8	Le Havre	1–1	Paris Saint-Germain	Le Havre
20:00 CEST (UTC+2)	Soloy 39'		Maurice 22'	Stadium: Stade Jules Deschaseaux; Attendance: 15,039; Referee: Alain Sars

26 September 1997 9	Paris Saint-Germain	1–1	Montpellier	Paris
20:00 CEST (UTC+2)	Raí 29' (pen.)		Baills 48'	Stadium: Parc des Princes; Attendance: 34,073; Referee: Gilles Veissière

5 October 1997 10	Nantes	0–0	Paris Saint-Germain	Nantes
20:30 CEST (UTC+2)				Stadium: Stade de la Beaujoire; Attendance: 23,000; Referee: Gilles Chéron

8 October 1997 11	Paris Saint-Germain	4–2	Guingamp	Paris
20:00 CEST (UTC+2)	Gava 3'; Raí 59' (pen.), 63'; Maurice 86'		Rouxel 14', 26'	Stadium: Parc des Princes; Attendance: 33,031; Referee: Franck Glochon

17 October 1997 12	Toulouse	0–2	Paris Saint-Germain	Toulouse
20:00 CEST (UTC+2)			Arribagé 26' (o.g.); Maurice 55'	Stadium: Stade de Toulouse; Attendance: 18,264; Referee: Rémi Harrel

25 October 1997 13	Paris Saint-Germain	2–0	Lens	Paris
20:00 CEST (UTC+2)	N'Gotty 21'; Raí 46'			Stadium: Parc des Princes; Attendance: 40,826; Referee: Laurent Duhamel

31 October 1997 14	Lyon	1–0	Paris Saint-Germain	Lyon
20:00 CET (UTC+1)	Kanouté 49'			Stadium: Stade de Gerland; Attendance: 22,000; Referee: Serge Leon

9 November 1997 15	Paris Saint-Germain	1–2	Marseille	Paris
20:30 CET (UTC+1)	Leroy 33'		Gravelaine 14'; Blanc 65' (pen.)	Stadium: Parc des Princes; Attendance: 43,307; Referee: Jean-Claude Puyalt

15 November 1997 16	Bordeaux	0–0	Paris Saint-Germain	Bordeaux
20:00 CET (UTC+1)				Stadium: Parc Lescure; Attendance: 32,000; Referee: Bernard Saules

20 November 1997 17	Monaco	3–0	Paris Saint-Germain	Monaco
20:30 CET (UTC+1)	Ikpeba 14'; Trezeguet 24', 42'			Stadium: Stade Louis II; Attendance: 9,000; Referee: Stéphane Bré

30 November 1997 18	Paris Saint-Germain	1–0	Auxerre	Paris
20:30 CET (UTC+1)	Danjou 90' (o.g.)			Stadium: Parc des Princes; Attendance: 38,878; Referee: Gilles Chéron

5 December 1997 19	Cannes	0–1	Paris Saint-Germain	Cannes
20:00 CET (UTC+1)			Raí 89'	Stadium: Stade Pierre De Coubertin; Attendance: 4,525; Referee: Patrick Anton

14 December 1997 20	Paris Saint-Germain	1–1	Metz	Paris
20:30 CET (UTC+1)	Raí 62'		Pirès 69'	Stadium: Parc des Princes; Attendance: 38,146; Referee: Marc Batta

19 December 1997 21	Rennes	1–2	Paris Saint-Germain	Rennes
20:00 CET (UTC+1)	Goussé 63'		Rabésandratana 44'; Algerino 81'	Stadium: Stade de la Route de Lorient; Attendance: 12,532; Referee: Claude Colombo

11 January 1998 22	Paris Saint-Germain	2–1	Strasbourg	Paris
18:30 CET (UTC+1)	Rabésandratana 55'; Simone 71'		Nouma 82'	Stadium: Parc des Princes; Attendance: 37,907; Referee: Laurent Duhamel

21 January 1998 23	Bastia	2–0	Paris Saint-Germain	Furiani
20:00 CET (UTC+1)	Laurent 36'; Kozniku 90'			Stadium: Stade Armand-Cesari; Attendance: 5,000; Referee: Gilles Veissière

24 January 1998 24	Paris Saint-Germain	0–2	Le Havre	Paris
20:00 CET (UTC+1)			Pouget 22', 72'	Stadium: Parc des Princes; Attendance: 33,431; Referee: Serge Leon

4 February 1998 25	Montpellier	2–1	Paris Saint-Germain	Montpellier
20:00 CET (UTC+1)	Fugier 57'; Sanchez 66'		Simone 33'	Stadium: Stade de la Mosson; Attendance: 16,051; Referee: Gilles Chéron

13 February 1998 26	Paris Saint-Germain	0–1	Nantes	Paris
20:00 CET (UTC+1)			Gourvennec 87' (pen.)	Stadium: Parc des Princes; Attendance: 39,987; Referee: Rémi Harrel

21 February 1998 27	Guingamp	0–0	Paris Saint-Germain	Guingamp
20:00 CET (UTC+1)				Stadium: Stade de Roudourou; Attendance: 17,943; Referee: Claude Colombo

7 March 1998 28	Paris Saint-Germain	1–1	Toulouse	Paris
20:00 CET (UTC+1)	Simone 58'		Tiéhi 59'	Stadium: Parc des Princes; Attendance: 34,639; Referee: Marc Batta

15 March 1998 29	Lens	3–0	Paris Saint-Germain	Lens
18:30 CET (UTC+1)	Vairelles 6'; Ziani 43'; Foé 75'			Stadium: Stade Félix Bollaert; Attendance: 40.293; Referee: Gilles Veissière

28 March 1998 30	Paris Saint-Germain	3–0	Lyon	Paris
20:00 CET (UTC+1)	Simone 17', 73'; Raí 20'			Stadium: Parc des Princes; Attendance: 37,031; Referee: Laurent Duhamel

8 April 1998 31	Marseille	0–0	Paris Saint-Germain	Marseille
20:30 CEST (UTC+2)				Stadium: Parc des Princes; Attendance: 56,346; Referee: Stéphane Bré

18 April 1998 32	Paris Saint-Germain	0–1	Bordeaux	Paris
20:00 CEST (UTC+2)			Wiltord 39'	Stadium: Parc des Princes; Attendance: 36,488; Referee: Éric Poulat

25 April 1998 33	Paris Saint-Germain	1–2	Monaco	Paris
20:00 CEST (UTC+2)	Ducrocq 25'		Ikpeba 28'; Trezeguet 90'	Stadium: Parc des Princes; Attendance: 39,239; Referee: Bernard Saules

9 May 1998 34	Châteauroux	2–1	Paris Saint-Germain	Châteauroux
20:00 CEST (UTC+2)	Tébily 27'; Čakar 59'		Simone 36'	Stadium: Stade Gaston Petit; Attendance: 14,280; Referee: Patrick Anton

=== Coupe de France ===
17 January 1998 Round of 64	CSC Thouars	1–3	Paris Saint-Germain	Niort
20:00 CET (UTC+1)	Zouaoui 78' (pen.)		Raí 14'; Fournier 35'; Maurice 61'	Stadium: Stade René Gaillard; Attendance: 10,500; Referee: Philippe Kalt

7 February 1998 Round of 32	Lorient	0–1	Paris Saint-Germain	Lorient
20:30 CET (UTC+1)			Simone 68'	Stadium: Stade du Moustoir; Attendance: 13,000; Referee: Bernard Saules

27 February 1998 Round of 16	Pau	0–1 (a.e.t.)	Paris Saint-Germain	Pau
20:30 CET (UTC+1)			Raí 113'	Stadium: Stade du Hameau; Attendance: 14,500; Referee: Patrick Anton

21 March 1998 Quarter-finals	Paris Saint-Germain	1–0	Monaco	Paris
20:45 CET (UTC+1)	Dumas 78' (o.g.)			Stadium: Parc des Princes; Attendance: 19,377; Referee: Alain Sars

12 April 1998 Semi-finals	Paris Saint-Germain	1–0	Guingamp	Paris
20:30 CEST (UTC+2)	Maurice 4'			Stadium: Parc des Princes; Attendance: 24,106; Referee: Claude Colombo

2 May 1998 Final	Paris Saint-Germain	2–1	Lens	Saint-Denis
20:00 CEST (UTC+2)	Raí 25'; Simone 53'		Šmicer 83'	Stadium: Stade de France; Attendance: 78,265; Referee: Gilles Veissière

=== Coupe de la Ligue ===
6 January 1998 Round of 32	Paris Saint-Germain	1–0	Lyon	Paris
21:00 CET (UTC+1)	Maurice 32'			Stadium: Parc des Princes; Attendance: 12,380; Referee: Rémi Harrel

1 February 1998 Round of 16	Paris Saint-Germain	2–0	Montpellier	Paris
21:00 CET (UTC+1)	Debbah 20'			Stadium: Parc des Princes; Attendance: 18,177; Referee: Patrick Anton

16 February 1998 Quarter-finals	Paris Saint-Germain	1–0	Metz	Paris
21:00 CET (UTC+1)	Maurice 60'			Stadium: Parc des Princes; Attendance: 19,282; Referee: Éric Poulat

12 March 1998 Semi-finals	Paris Saint-Germain	2–1	Lens	Paris
20:45 CET (UTC+1)	Simone 52', 56'		Ziani 37'	Stadium: Parc des Princes; Attendance: 28,692; Referee: Bernard Saules

4 April 1998 Final	Paris Saint-Germain	2–2 (a.e.t.) (4–2 p)	Bordeaux	Saint-Denis
20:45 CEST (UTC+2)	Simone 80'; Raí 107'		Micoud 30'; Papin 114'	Stadium: Stade de France; Attendance: 77,700; Referee: Rémi Harrel
	Penalties
	Rabesandratana (penalty scored); Simone (penalty scored); Raí (penalty scored); Loko (penalty scored)		(penalty missed) Gralak; (penalty missed) Papin; (penalty scored) Luccin; (penalty scored) Micoud

=== UEFA Champions League ===
==== Second qualifying round ====
13 August 1997 First leg	Steaua București (Romania)	3–0	(France) Paris Saint-Germain	Bucharest, Romania
18:30 CEST (UTC+2)	Rotariu 53' (pen.); Şerban 70'; Lăcătuş 77'	Report	Guérin 18'; Maurice 64'	Stadium: Stadionul Steaua; Attendance: 20,500; Referee: José García Aranda (Spain)
Note: Match awarded because Paris Saint-Germain fielded an ineligible player.

27 August 1997 Second leg	Paris Saint-Germain (France)	5–0 (5–3 agg.)	(Romania) Steaua București	Paris, France
19:45 CEST (UTC+2)	Raí 2', 21' (pen.), 55' (pen.); Simone 30'; Maurice 40'	Report		Stadium: Parc des Princes; Attendance: 42,585; Referee: Dick Jol (Netherlands)

==== Group stage ====
Pos	Team	Pld	W	D	L	GF	GA	GD	Pts	Qualification
1	(Germany) Bayern Munich	6	4	0	2	13	6	+7	12	Advance to knockout stage
2	(France) Paris Saint-Germain	6	4	0	2	11	10	+1	12	
3	(Turkey) Beşiktaş	6	2	0	4	6	9	−3	6	
4	(Sweden) IFK Göteborg	6	2	0	4	4	9	−5	6	

Source: UEFA

17 September 1997 1	Paris Saint-Germain (France)	3–0	(Sweden) IFK Göteborg	Paris, France
20:45 CEST (UTC+2)	Ngotty 27'; Lučić 51' (o.g.); Raí 82' (pen.)	Report		Stadium: Parc des Princes; Attendance: 26,189; Referee: Paul Durkin (England)

1 October 1997 2	Beşiktaş (Turkey)	3–1	(France) Paris Saint-Germain	Istanbul, Turkey
20:45 CEST (UTC+2)	Derelioğlu 5', 42' Sağlam 83'	Report	Simone 66'	Stadium: BJK İnönü Stadium; Attendance: 12,056; Referee: Günter Benkö (Austria)

22 October 1997 3	Bayern Munich (Germany)	5–1	(France) Paris Saint-Germain	Munich, Germany
20:45 CEST (UTC+2)	Élber 4', 73'; Jancker 21', 47'; Helmer 51'	Report	Simone 48'	Stadium: Olympiastadion; Attendance: 46,000; Referee: Manuel Díaz Vega (Spain)

5 November 1997 4	Paris Saint-Germain (France)	3–1	(Germany) Bayern Munich	Paris, France
20:45 CET (UTC+1)	Gava 17'; Maurice 73'; Leroy 75'	Report	Babbel 28'	Stadium: Parc des Princes; Attendance: 32,274; Referee: Piero Ceccarini (Italy)

26 November 1997 5	IFK Göteborg (Sweden)	0–1	(France) Paris Saint-Germain	Gothenburg, Sweden
20:45 CET (UTC+1)		Report	Rabésandratana 88'	Stadium: Ullevi; Attendance: 19,323; Referee: Giorgos Bikas (Greece)

10 December 1997 6	Paris Saint-Germain (France)	2–1	(Turkey) Beşiktaş	Paris, France
20:45 CET (UTC+1)	Gava 23'; Simone 58'	Report	Özdilek 37'	Stadium: Parc des Princes; Attendance: 34,038; Referee: Antonio López Nieto (Spain)
