= 1996–97 Coupe de la Ligue =

French League Cup

Tournament details
- Country: France
- Dates: 28 August 1996 – 12 April 1997
- Teams: 47

Final positions
- Champions: Strasbourg (1st title)
- Runners-up: Bordeaux

Tournament statistics
- Matches played: 46
- Goals scored: 120 (2.61 per match)
- Top goal scorer: David Zitelli (5 goals)

The 1996–97 Coupe de la Ligue began on 28 August 1996 and the final took place on 12 April 1997 at the Stade de France. Metz were the defending champions, but were knocked-out by Caen in the Round of 16. Strasbourg went on to win the tournament, beating Bordeaux 6–5 on penalties in the final.

== First preliminary round ==
The match was played on 28 August 1996.

| Team 1 | Score | Team 2 |
|---|---|---|
| Alès | 1–2 | Nîmes |

== Second preliminary round ==
The matches were played on 1 October and 13 November 1996.

| Team 1 | Score | Team 2 |
|---|---|---|
| Stade Poitevin | 0–1 | Dunkerque |
| Nîmes | 0–0 (a.e.t.) (4–3 p) | Angers |

== First round ==
The matches were played on 23 October and 20 November 1996.

| Team 1 | Score | Team 2 |
|---|---|---|
| Nîmes | 1–0 | Beauvais |
| Louhans-Cuiseaux | 5–1 | Gueugnon |
| Amiens | 0–0 (a.e.t.) (5–6 p) | Saint-Étienne |
| Épinal | 1–0 | Perpignan |
| Toulouse | 3–1 (a.e.t.) | Stade Briochin |
| Troyes | 2–0 | Sochaux |
| Toulon | 2–1 | Laval |
| Châteauroux | 2–2 (a.e.t.) (4–2 p) | Mulhouse |
| Valence | 1–0 | Charleville |
| Red Star | 1–4 | Lorient |
| Le Mans | 1–1 (a.e.t.) (3–2 p) | Martigues |
| Niort | 4–1 | Dunkerque |

== Second round ==
The matches were played on 10 and 11 December 1996.

| Team 1 | Score | Team 2 |
|---|---|---|
| Marseille | 3–2 | Auxerre |
| Lyon | 2–1 | Paris Saint-Germain |
| Monaco | 3–3 (a.e.t.) (4–2 p) | Troyes |
| Montpellier | 2–2 (a.e.t.) (4–2 p) | Bastia |
| Rennes | 1–0 | Le Havre |
| Nice | 2–2 (a.e.t.) (4–5 p) | Caen |
| Cannes | 1–0 | Nancy |
| Niort | 0–2 | Lens |
| Metz | 2–0 | Lorient |
| Nantes | 2–1 | Valence |
| Strasbourg | 3–0 | Saint-Étienne |
| Toulon | 2–1 | Lille |
| Bordeaux | 3–0 | Châteauroux |
| Nîmes | 1–0 | Guingamp |
| Le Mans | 2–0 | Épinal |
| Toulouse | 2–3 | Louhans-Cuiseaux |

== Round of 16 ==
The matches were played on 10, 11, 12 and 15 January 1997.

| Team 1 | Score | Team 2 |
|---|---|---|
| Nîmes | 0–1 | Montpellier |
| Strasbourg | 2–0 | Cannes |
| Toulon | 0–1 | Lens |
| Bordeaux | 1–0 (a.e.t.) | Marseille |
| Caen | 1–0 | Metz |
| Louhans-Cuiseaux | 0–0 (a.e.t.) (4–2 p) | Nantes |
| Le Mans | 1–3 | Monaco |
| Rennes | 4–3 | Lyon |

== Quarter-finals ==
The matches were played on 28 and 29 January 1997.

| Team 1 | Score | Team 2 |
|---|---|---|
| Strasbourg | 5–1 (a.e.t.) | Louhans-Cuiseaux |
| Montpellier | 2–1 (a.e.t.) | Rennes |
| Bordeaux | 0–0 (a.e.t.) (4–2 p) | Caen |
| Lens | 0–1 | Monaco |

== Semi-finals ==
The matches were played on 18 and 19 February 1997.

| Team 1 | Score | Team 2 |
|---|---|---|
| Bordeaux | 2–2 (a.e.t.) (7–6 p) | Montpellier |
| Strasbourg | 2–1 | Monaco |

== Final ==
The final was played on 12 April 1997 at the Parc des Princes.

12 April 1997
20:45

| Strasbourg | 0–0 | Bordeaux |
Penalties
| Nouma (penalty scored); Suchopárek (penalty scored); Ismaël (penalty scored); M'Ghoghi (penalty scored); Rott (penalty scored); Collet (penalty scored); Baticle (penalty missed); Raschke (penalty missed); Petit (penalty missed) | 6–5 | (penalty scored) Tholot; (penalty scored) Gralak; (penalty scored) Pavon; (penalty scored) Colleter; (penalty scored) Luccin; (penalty missed) Grenet; (penalty missed) Domoraud; (penalty missed) Lambourde; (penalty missed) Diawara |

Parc des Princes, Paris
Attendance: 39,878
Referee: Philippe Leduc
