= Pavon =

Pavón or Pavon can refer to:

== Animals ==
- Doxocopa pavon, a brush-footed butterfly commonly known as the pavon
- Horned guan (Spanish, pavón)
- Peacock bass (Cichla), also known as the pavon

== Places ==
- Pavón, Costa Rica, a town in Puntarenas Province, Costa Rica
- Pavón, Santa Fe, a town in Santa Fe, Argentina
  - Battle of Pavón (1861)
- Pavón Prison, a notorious prison at Fraijanes, Guatemala
- Isla Pavón, an island in the Santa Cruz River in southern Argentina
- Teatro Pavón, a theatre in Seville

== People ==
- Adri Pavón (born 1989), Spanish footballer
- Andrés Pavón (born 1962), Honduran politician and Human Rights activist
- Blanca Estela Pavón (1926–1949), Mexican actress
- Carlos Pavón (born 1973), Honduran footballer
- Camerina Pavón y Oviedo (1862–1893), Mexican poet, granddaughter of José Ignacio Pavón
- Cecilia Pavón (born 1973), Argentine writer, poet, and translator
- Cristian Pavón (born 1996), Argentine footballer
- Cristopher Pavón (born 1993), Honduran weightlifter
- Daniel Pavón (born 1972), Spanish Olympic diver
- Enrique Pavón Pereyra (1921–2004), Argentine historian and biographer
- Eulises Pavón (born 1993), Nicaraguan footballer
- Francisco Pavón (born 1980), Spanish football defender
- Francisco Pavón (Honduran footballer) (born 1977), Honduran football midfielder
- Iñaki Caña Pavón (born 1975), Spanish football player and coach
- José Antonio Pavón Jiménez (1754-1840), Spanish botanist based in South America
- José Ignacio Pavón (1791–1866), Mexican civil servant, and briefly, interim President of Mexico
- José María Morelos y Pavon, a military leader who fought in the Mexican War of Independence
- Juan Pavón (born 1962), Spanish computer scientist
- Juan Manuel Pavón (born 1976), Spanish footballer and manager
- Juana Pavón (1945–2019), Honduran poet and actress
- Julia Pavón (born 1968), Spanish historian and Professor of Medieval History
- Luz Pavon, Model and the founder of PAVON NYC, a clothing brand
- Manuel Pavón (born 1984), Spanish footballer
- Manuel Francisco Pavón Aycinena (1798–1855), Guatemalan politician
- Matthieu Pavon (born 1992), French golfer
- Michel Pavon (born 1968), French footballer and coach, son of Pépito Pavon
- Pablo Pavón Vinales (born 1945), Mexican trade union leader and politician
- Pastora Pavón (189 –1969), better known as La Niña de los Peines, Spanish flamenco singer
- Pépito Pavon (1941–2012), Spanish footballer
- Rafael Pavón (born 1951), Argentine footballer.
