= 1998 Coupe de la Ligue final =

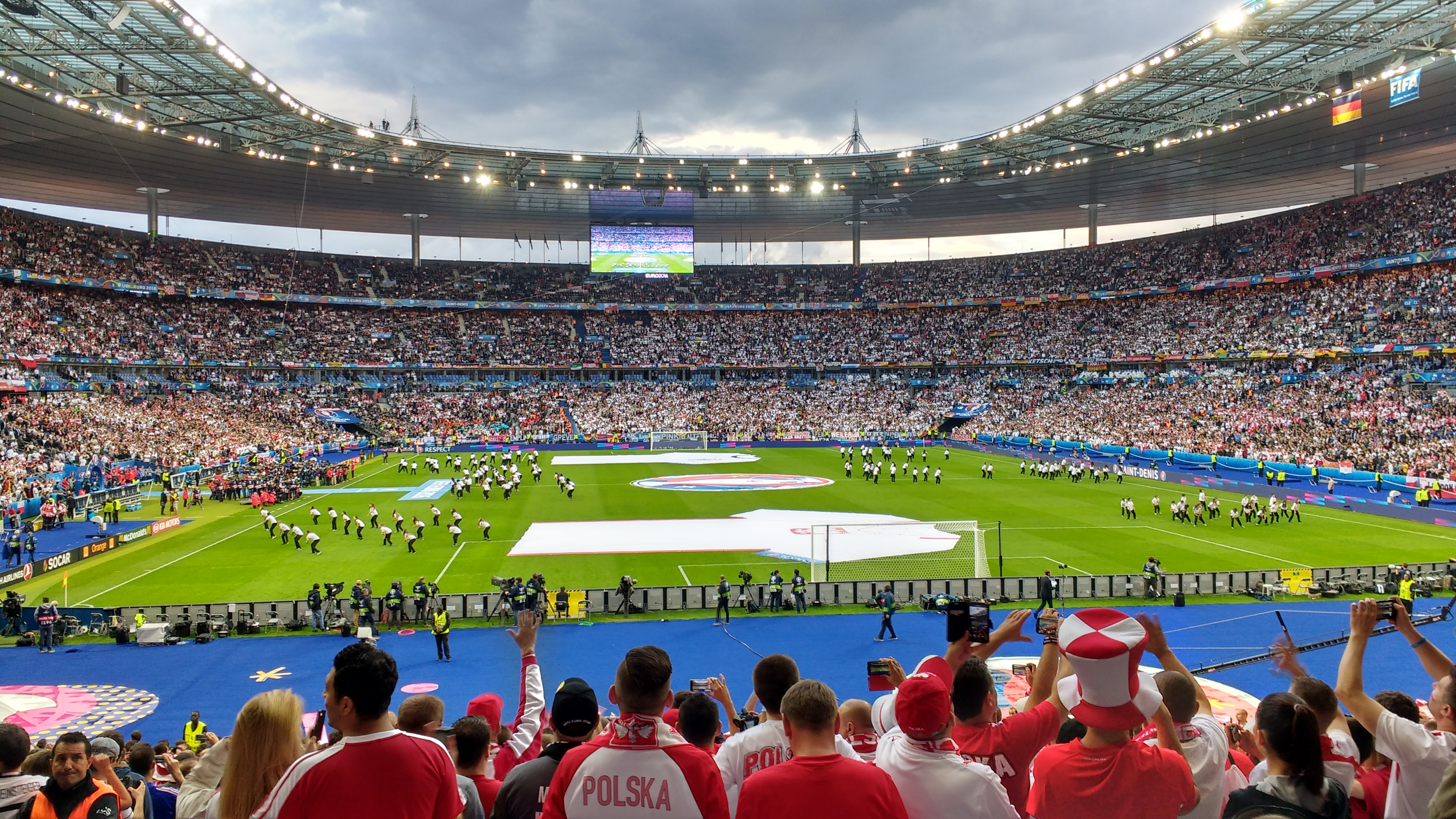
- Event: 1997–98 Coupe de la Ligue
Paris Saint-Germain	Bordeaux
Division 1	Division 1
2	2
- After extra time Paris Saint-Germain won 4–2 on penalties
- Date: 4 April 1998
- Venue: Stade de France, Saint-Denis
- Referee: Rémi Harrel
- Attendance: 77,700

The 1998 Coupe de la Ligue final was a football match held at Stade de France, Saint-Denis on 4 April 1998, that saw Paris Saint-Germain defeat Bordeaux in a penalty shoot-out.

== Route to the final ==
Note: In all results below, the score of the finalist is given first (H: home; A: away).

Paris Saint-Germain		Round	Bordeaux	
Opponent	Result	1997–98 Coupe de la Ligue	Opponent	Result
Lyon (H)	1–0	Second round	Mulhouse (A)	3–0
Montpellier (H)	2–0	Round of 16	Le Mans (H)	5–1
Metz (H)	1–0	Quarter-finals	Stade Poitevin (H)	4–3 (a.e.t.)
Lens (H)	2–1	Semi-finals	Auxerre (H)	1–1 (a.e.t.) (4–2 p)

== Match details ==
4 April 1998
20:45

Paris Saint-Germain	2–2 (a.e.t.)	Bordeaux
Simone 80'; Raí 107'		Micoud 30'; Papin 114'
Penalties
Rabesandratana (penalty scored); Simone (penalty scored); Raí (penalty scored); Loko (penalty scored)	4–2	(penalty missed) Gralak; (penalty missed) Papin; (penalty scored) Luccin; (penalty scored) Micoud

Stade de France, Saint-Denis
Attendance: 77,700
Referee: Rémi Harrel

PARIS SAINT-GERMAIN FC:
GK	16	(France) Vincent Fernandez
DF	17	(France) Jimmy Algerino
DF	5	(France) Alain Roche	(substituted off) 77'
DF	6	(France) Paul Le Guen
DF	15	(Madagascar) Éric Rabésandratana
MF	3	(France) Didier Domi	(substituted off) 110'
MF	23	(France) Pierre Ducrocq
MF	10	(Brazil) Raí (c)
MF	20	(France) Franck Gava
FW	9	(Italy) Marco Simone
FW	18	(France) Florian Maurice	(substituted off) 74'
Substitutes:
FW	11	(France) Patrice Loko	(substituted on) 74'
MF	13	(France) Laurent Fournier	(substituted on) 77'
MF	24	(France) Édouard Cissé	(substituted on) 110'
Manager:
(Brazil) Ricardo Gomes Assistant Referees: Fourth Official:

FC GIRONDINS DE BORDEAUX:
GK	16	(France) Ulrich Ramé
DF	19	(France) Patrick Blondeau	(substituted off) 80'
DF	4	(Federal Republic of Yugoslavia) Niša Saveljić
DF	3	(Brazil) Paulo Sérgio Gralak
DF	2	(France) (Tunisia) David Jemmali
MF	14	(France) François Grenet	(substituted off) 29'
MF	7	(France) Michel Pavon (c)
MF	26	(France) Peter Luccin
MF	8	(France) Johan Micoud
FW	9	(France) Lilian Laslandes
FW	11	(France) Sylvain Wiltord
Substitutes:
FW	27	(France) Jean-Pierre Papin	(substituted on) 29'
DF	17	(France) Kodjo Afanou	(substituted on) 80'
Manager:
(France) Élie Baup

== See also ==
- 1998 Coupe de France final
- 1997–98 Paris Saint-Germain FC season
