= 1997 Coupe de la Ligue final =

- Event: 1996–97 Coupe de la Ligue
Strasbourg	Bordeaux
Division 1	Division 1
0	0
- After extra time Strasbourg won 6–5 on penalties
- Date: 12 April 1997
- Venue: Parc des Princes, Paris
- Referee: Philippe Leduc
- Attendance: 39,878

The 1997 Coupe de la Ligue final was a football match held at Parc des Princes, Paris on 12 April 1997, that saw RC Strasbourg defeat FC Girondins de Bordeaux in a penalty shootout

== Route to the final ==
Note: In all results below, the score of the finalist is given first (H: home; A: away).

Strasbourg		Round	Bordeaux	
Opponent	Result	1996–97 Coupe de la Ligue	Opponent	Result
Saint-Étienne (H)	3–0	Second round	Châteauroux (H)	3–0
Cannes (H)	2–0	Round of 16	Marseille (H)	1–0 (a.e.t.)
Louhans-Cuiseaux (H)	5–1 (a.e.t.)	Quarter-finals	Caen (H)	0–0 (a.e.t.) (4–2 p)
Monaco (H)	2–1	Semi-finals	Montpellier (H)	2–2 (a.e.t.) (7–6 p)

== Match details ==
12 April 1997
20:45

Strasbourg	0–0	Bordeaux
Penalties
Nouma (penalty scored); Suchopárek (penalty scored); Ismaël (penalty scored); M'Ghoghi (penalty scored); Rott (penalty scored); Collet (penalty scored); Baticle (penalty missed); Raschke (penalty missed); Petit (penalty missed)	6–5	(penalty scored) Tholot; (penalty scored) Gralak; (penalty scored) Pavon; (penalty scored) Colleter; (penalty scored) Luccin; (penalty missed) Grenet; (penalty missed) Domoraud; (penalty missed) Lambourde; (penalty missed) Diawara

Parc des Princes, Paris
Attendance: 39,878
Referee: Philippe Leduc

GK	1	(Slovakia) Alexander Vencel
DF	2	(France) Philippe Raschke
DF	6	(France) Jean-Luc Dogon	(substituted off) 110'
DF	5	(France) Valérien Ismaël
DF	3	(Czech Republic) Jan Suchopárek
MF	4	(France) Olivier Dacourt	(substituted off) 107'
MF	8	(Nigeria) Godwin Okpara
MF	7	(Madagascar) Stéphane Collet
FW	9	(France) Gérald Baticle
FW	11	(France) Pascal Nouma
FW	10	(France) David Zitelli	(substituted off) 95'
Substitutes:
FW	14	(France) Vincent Petit	(substituted on) 95'
MF	15	(Belgium) Karim M'Ghoghi	(substituted on) 77'
DF	16	(France) Yannick Rott	(substituted on) 110'
Manager:
(France) Jacky Duguépéroux

GK	1	(Belgium) Gilbert Bodart
DF	3	(Ivory Coast) Cyrille Domoraud
DF	2	(France) Bernard Lambourde
DF	4	(Brazil) Paulo Sérgio Gralak
DF	6	(France) Patrick Colleter
MF	5	(France) Michel Pavon
MF	7	(France) Ibrahim Ba	(substituted off) 105'
MF	8	(France) Johan Micoud
MF	10	(France) Stéphane Ziani	(substituted off) 75'
FW	9	(France) Jean-Pierre Papin	(substituted off) 76'
FW	11	(France) Didier Tholot
Substitutes:
MF	14	(France) Peter Luccin	(substituted on) 75'
DF	13	(Guinea) Kaba Diawara	(substituted on) 76'
DF	15	(France) François Grenet	(substituted on) 105'
Manager:
(France) Rolland Courbis

== See also ==
- 1997 Coupe de France final
