= Ulrich Ramé =

French footballer (born 1972)

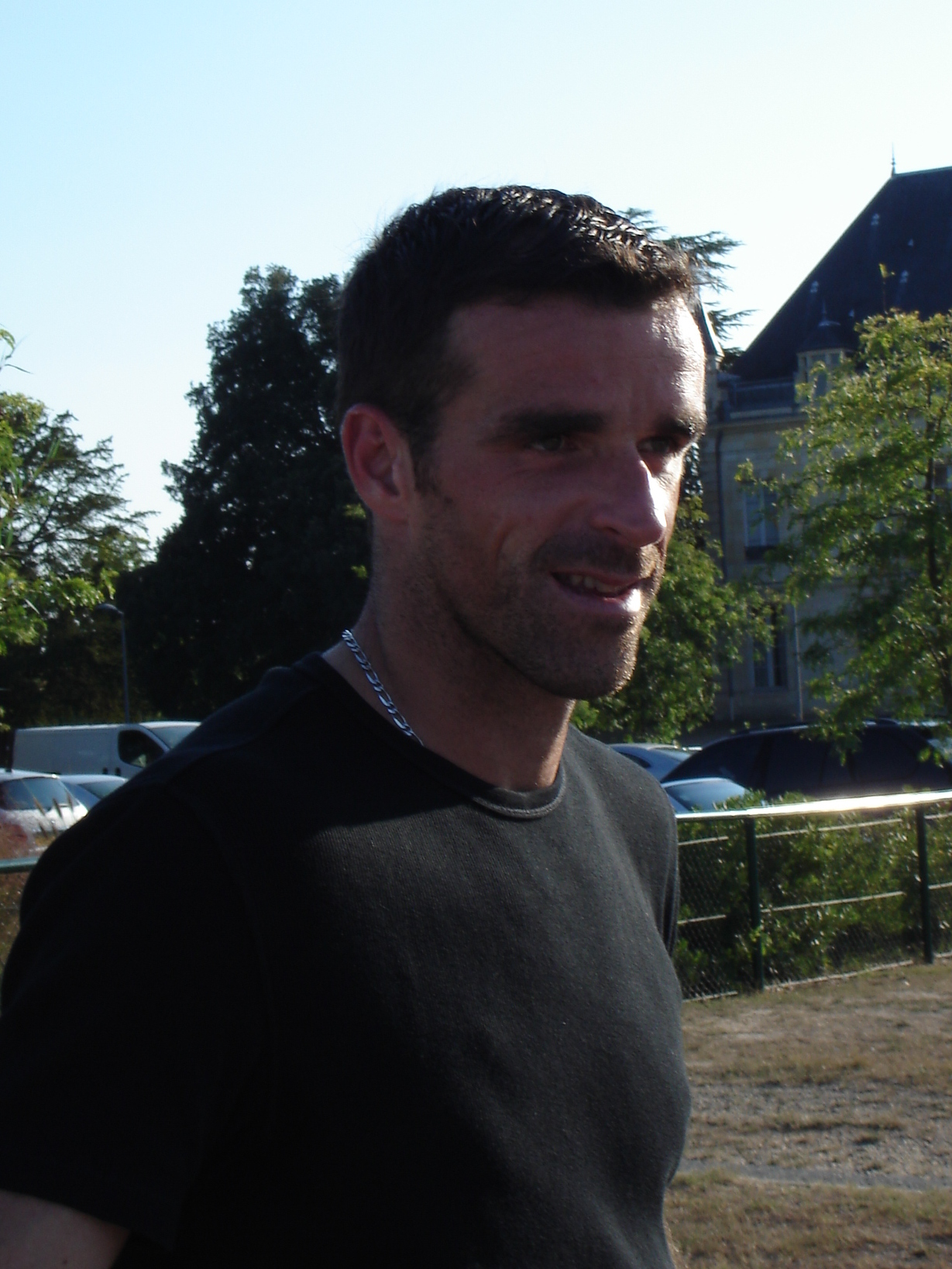
- Ramé in 2005

Personal information
- Full name: Ulrich Jean Eugène Ramé
- Date of birth: 19 September 1972 (age 54)
- Place of birth: Nantes, Loire-Atlantique, France
- Height: 1.87 m (6 ft 2 in)
- Position: Goalkeeper

Youth career
- Angers

Senior career*
Years	Team	Apps	(Gls)
1991–1997	Angers	76	(0)
1997–2011	Bordeaux	406	(0)
2011–2013	Sedan	46	(0)
Total		527	(0)

International career
1999–2003	France	12 (Note: Including one match against FIFA XI team)	(0)

Managerial career
- 2016: Bordeaux
Medal record
Men's football
Representing France
UEFA European Championship
Winner	2000
FIFA Confederations Cup
Winner	2001
- * Club domestic league appearances and goals

Ulrich Jean Eugène Ramé (born 19 September 1972) is a French former professional footballer who played as a goalkeeper.

In a professional career which spanned two decades, he played mainly for Bordeaux (14 seasons), appearing in more than 500 official matches and winning six major titles.

A French international during four years, Ramé represented the nation at Euro 2000.

== Club career ==
Born in Nantes, Loire-Atlantique, Ramé started playing professionally with SCO Angers, making his Ligue 1 debut in 1993–94 but being immediately relegated. Two years later the Maine-et-Loire club dropped down another division, but the player returned to the top flight the following season, signing for FC Girondins de Bordeaux.

After 23 appearances in his debut campaign, helping his team finish fifth and reach the domestic League Cup final the following year, Ramé became Bordeaux's undisputed first-choice. He helped the side win two national championships – separated by ten years – and three more league cups.

In the 2009–10 campaign, after Cédric Carrasso's signing, 37-year-old Ramé became the backup. In June 2011, after 520 matches played with the Girondins all competitions comprised, he returned to Ligue 2 and joined CS Sedan Ardennes.

== International career ==
Ramé made his debut for France on 9 June 1999, in a UEFA Euro 2000 qualifying 1–0 win in Andorra. He was subsequently picked for the final stages' squad, with the national team winning the tournament; after Bernard Lama's international retirement, he became second-choice.

Ramé played three matches at the 2001 FIFA Confederations Cup, with France again emerging victorious. Again as a backup, he represented the nation in the 2002 FIFA World Cup, also in South Korea; after making a blunder against Czech Republic on 12 February 2003, however, he fell out of favor with manager Jacques Santini and was not recalled again.

== Career statistics ==
Appearances and goals by club, season and competition
Club	Season	League			National cup (Note: Includes Coupe de France)		League cup (Note: Includes Coupe de la Ligue)		Europe (Note: Includes UEFA Champions League, UEFA Cup)		Other		Total	
Club	Season	Division	Apps	Goals	Apps	Goals	Apps	Goals	Apps	Goals	Apps	Goals	Apps	Goals
Angers	1991–92	Division 2	1	0	1	0	—		—		—		2	0
Angers	1992–93	Division 2	1	0	0	0	—		—		2	0	3	0
Angers	1993–94	Division 1	2	0	0	0	—		—		—		2	0
Angers	1994–95	Division 2	9	0	1	0	0	0	—		—		10	0
Angers	1995–96	Division 2	28	0	1	0	1	0	—		—		30	0
Angers	1996–97	Championnat National	35	0	0	0	1	0	—		—		36	0
Angers	Total		76	0	3	0	2	0	—		2	0	83	0
Bordeaux	1997–98	Division 1	23	0	6	0	4	0	2	0	—		31	0
Bordeaux	1998–99	Division 1	32	0	1	0	0	0	8	0	—		41	0
Bordeaux	1999–2000	Division 1	34	0	5	0	2	0	11	0	1	0	52	0
Bordeaux	2000–01	Division 1	34	0	2	0	2	0	6	0	—		44	0
Bordeaux	2001–02	Division 1	34	0	1	0	0	0	5	0	—		40	0
Bordeaux	2002–03	Ligue 1	28	0	4	0	0	0	6	0	—		38	0
Bordeaux	2003–04	Ligue 1	35	0	2	0	1	0	10	0	—		48	0
Bordeaux	2004–05	Ligue 1	37	0	1	0	0	0	—		—		38	0
Bordeaux	2005–06	Ligue 1	35	0	1	0	3	0	—		—		39	0
Bordeaux	2006–07	Ligue 1	38	0	2	0	4	0	8	0	—		52	0
Bordeaux	2007–08	Ligue 1	36	0	4	0	1	0	7	0	—		48	0
Bordeaux	2008–09	Ligue 1	26	0	0	0	0	0	5	0	1	0	32	0
Bordeaux	2009–10	Ligue 1	10	0	3	0	3	0	2	0	0	0	18	0
Bordeaux	2010–11	Ligue 1	3	0	0	0	0	0	—		—		3	0
Bordeaux	Total		405	0	32	0	20	0	70	0	2	0	529	0
Sedan	2011–12	Ligue 2	32	0	3	0	2	0	—		—		37	0
Sedan	2012–13	Ligue 2	14	0	0	0	0	0	—		—		14	0
Sedan	Total		46	0	3	0	2	0	—		—		51	0
Career total			527	0	38	0	24	0	70	0	4	0	663	0

== Managerial statistics ==
As of 14 May 2016

Team	From	To	Record							
Team	From	To	G	W	D	L	GF	GA	GD	Win %
Bordeaux	14 March 2016	27 May 2016	7	3	2	2	11	8	+3	42.86
Total			7	3	2	2	11	8	+3	42.86

== Honours ==
Bordeaux

- Division/Ligue 1: 1998–99, 2008–09
- Coupe de la Ligue: 2001–02, 2006–07, 2008–09; runner-up: 1997–98, 2009–10
- Trophée des Champions: 2008, 2009; runner-up: 1999

France

- UEFA European Championship: 2000
- FIFA Confederations Cup: 2001
