= 2010–11 FC Girondins de Bordeaux season =

Bordeaux
2010–11 season
- President: Jean-Louis Triaud
- Head coach: Jean Tigana
- Stadium: Stade Chaban-Delmas
- Ligue 1: 7th
- Coupe de France: Round of 32
- Coupe de la Ligue: Round of 16
- Top goalscorer: League: Anthony Modeste (10); All: Anthony Modeste (12)
Home colours	Away colours	Third colours

The 2010–11 season was the 121st season in the existence of FC Girondins de Bordeaux and the club's 20th consecutive season in the top flight of French football. In addition to the domestic league, Bordeaux participated in this season's editions of the Coupe de France and the Coupe de la Ligue.

== Season summary ==
Under new manager Jean Tigana, Bordeaux would record their lowest finish since 2004-05, when they finished 7th in the league. they would be knocked out by Angers in the Coupe de France round of 32, and knocked out by Saint-Étienne in the Coupe de la Ligue round of 16. Tigana would leave his role as Head coach on 7 May 2011, being replaced by Éric Bedouet on an interim basis until the end of the season.

== Squad ==
Squad at end of season

Note: Flags indicate national team as defined under FIFA eligibility rules; some limited exceptions apply. Players may hold more than one non-FIFA nationality.

No.	Pos.	Nation	Player
1	GK	FRA	Cédric Carrasso
2	DF	FRA	Michaël Ciani
3	DF	BRA	Henrique
4	MF	FRA	Alou Diarra
5	MF	BRA	Fernando Menegazzo
6	DF	SEN	Salif Sane
7	FW	FRA	Yoan Gouffran
8	MF	TUN	Fahid Ben Khalfallah
9	FW	BRA	André
10	FW	BRA	Jussiê
14	MF	TOG	Floyd Ayité
15	DF	SRB	Vujadin Savić
16	GK	FRA	Ulrich Ramé
17	MF	BRA	Wendel

No.	Pos.	Nation	Player
18	MF	CZE	Jaroslav Plašil
19	MF	FRA	Pierre Ducasse
21	DF	FRA	Matthieu Chalmé
22	FW	FRA	Anthony Modeste
23	DF	FRA	Florian Marange
25	FW	MLI	Cheikh Diabaté
27	DF	FRA	Marc Planus
28	DF	FRA	Benoît Trémoulinas
29	DF	SEN	Lamine Sané (Note: Sané was born in Villeneuve-sur-Lot, France, but also qualified to represent Senegal internationally.)
30	GK	FRA	Kévin Olimpa
33	MF	FRA	Rémi Elissalde
40	GK	FRA	Abdoulaye Keita
50	GK	SLO	Ažbe Jug

== Competitions ==
=== Overview ===
Competition	First match	Last match	Starting round	Final position	Record							
Competition	First match	Last match	Starting round	Final position	Pld	W	D	L	GF	GA	GD	Win %
Ligue 1	7 August 2010	29 May 2011	Matchday 1	7th	38	12	15	11	43	42	+1	31.58
Coupe de France	8 January 2011	22 January 2011	Round of 64	Round of 32	2	1	0	1	3	2	+1	50.00
Coupe de la Ligue	22 September 2010	26 October 2010	Third round	Round of 16	2	1	0	1	2	2	+0	50.00
Total					42	14	15	13	48	46	+2	33.33

Source: Soccerway

=== Ligue 1 ===
==== League table ====
Pos	Team	Pld	W	D	L	GF	GA	GD	Pts	Qualification or relegation
5	Sochaux	38	17	7	14	60	43	+17	58	Qualification to Europa League play-off round (Note: As 2010–11 Coupe de France winners Lille qualified for the UEFA Champions League and cup runners-up Paris St. Germain were already ensured of a UEFA Europa League spot via league placement, the play-off round berth reserved for the cup winners was awarded to Sochaux, the fifth-placed team.)
6	Rennes	38	15	11	12	38	35	+3	56	Qualification to Europa League third qualifying round (Note: As Coupe de la Ligue winners Marseille qualified for the UEFA Champions League, the UEFA Europa League third qualification round berth reserved for the League Cup winners was awarded to Rennes, the sixth-placed team.)
7	Bordeaux	38	12	15	11	43	42	+1	51	
8	Toulouse	38	14	8	16	38	36	+2	50	
9	Auxerre	38	10	19	9	45	41	+4	49	

Source: Ligue 1
Rules for classification: 1) points; 2) goal difference; 3) number of goals scored.

==== Results summary ====
Overall								Home						Away					
Pld	W	D	L	GF	GA	GD	Pts	W	D	L	GF	GA	GD	W	D	L	GF	GA	GD
38	12	15	11	43	42	+1	51	8	6	5	22	17	+5	4	9	6	21	25	−4

Source: Ligue 1

==== Results by round ====
Round	1	2	3	4	5	6	7	8	9	10	11	12	13	14	15	16	17	18	19	20	21	22	23	24	25	26	27	28	29	30	31	32	33	34	35	36	37	38
Ground	A	H	A	H	A	H	A	H	A	H	A	H	H	A	H	A	H	A	H	A	H	A	H	A	H	A	H	A	A	H	A	H	A	H	A	H	A	H
Result	L	L	W	D	L	W	D	W	W	L	D	D	W	W	D	D	D	D	D	L	W	D	L	L	W	W	L	D	D	D	D	W	D	L	L	W	L	W
Position	18	20	17	14	18	13	13	10	7	9	9	10	8	7	7	8	8	9	8	10	8	9	9	12	10	7	8	8	8	8	10	6	8	9	11	8	9	7

Source: Ligue 1
A = Away; H = Home; W = Win; D = Draw; L = Loss

==== Matches ====
8 August 2010 1	Montpellier	1-0	Bordeaux	Montpellier
20:00				Stadium: Stade de la Mosson; Attendance: 21,915

15 August 2010 2	Bordeaux	1-2	Toulouse	Bordeaux
16:00				Stadium: Stade Chaban-Delmas; Attendance: 31,614

22 August 2010 3	Paris SG	1-2	Bordeaux	Paris
20:00				Stadium: Parc des Princes; Attendance: 30,073

29 August 2010 4	Bordeaux	1-1	Marseille	Bordeaux
20:00				Stadium: Stade Chaban-Delmas; Attendance: 32,805

12 September 2010 5	Nice	1-2	Bordeaux	Nice
16:00				Stadium: Allianz Riviera; Attendance: 10,309

19 September 2010 6	Bordeaux	2-0	Lyon	Bordeaux
20:00				Stadium: Stade Chaban-Delmas; Attendance: 29,890

25 September 2010 7	Caen	0-0	Bordeaux	Caen
18:00				Stadium: Stade Michel d'Ornano; Attendance: 19,467

2 October 2010 8	Bordeaux	1-0	Lorient	Bordeaux
18:00				Stadium: Stade Chaban-Delmas; Attendance: 23,944

16 October 2010 9	Auxerre	0-1	Bordeaux	Auxerre
18:00				Stadium: Stade de l'Abbé-Deschamps; Attendance: 10,270

23 October 2010 10	Bordeaux	0-2	Brest	Bordeaux
18:00				Stadium: Stade Chaban-Delmas; Attendance: 24,160

2 November 2010 11	Monaco	2-2	Bordeaux	Monaco
18:00				Stadium: Stade Louis II; Attendance: 5,105

6 November 2010 12	Bordeaux	1-1	Valenciennes	Bordeaux
18:00				Stadium: Stade Chaban-Delmas; Attendance: 21,679

13 November 2010 13	Bordeaux	2-1	Nancy	Bordeaux
18:00				Stadium: Stade Chaban-Delmas; Attendance: 22,640

21 November 2010 14	Arles-Avignon	2-4	Bordeaux	Avignon
16:00				Stadium: Parc des Sports; Attendance: 9,285

27 November 2010 15	Bordeaux	1-1	Lille	Bordeaux
20:00				Stadium: Stade Chaban-Delmas; Attendance: 26,066

5 December 2010 16	Saint-Étienne	2-2	Bordeaux	Saint-Étienne
20:00				Stadium: Stade Geoffroy-Guichard; Attendance: 19,008

12 December 2010 17	Bordeaux	0-0	Rennes	Bordeaux
20:00				Stadium: Stade Chaban-Delmas; Attendance: 19,991

19 December 2010 18	Sochaux	1-1	Bordeaux	Montbéliard
16:00				Stadium: Stade Auguste Bonal; Attendance: 12,030

22 December 2010 19	Bordeaux	2-2	Lens	Bordeaux
20:00				Stadium: Stade Chaban-Delmas; Attendance: 24,014

16 January 2011 20	Marseille	2-1	Bordeaux	Marseille
20:00				Stadium: Stade Vélodrome; Attendance: 48,147

30 January 2011 21	Bordeaux	2-0	Nice	Bordeaux
16:00				Stadium: Stade Chaban-Delmas; Attendance: 20,368

6 February 2011 22	Lyon	0-0	Bordeaux	Lyon
20:00				Stadium: Groupama Stadium; Attendance: 35,909

12 February 2011 23	Bordeaux	1-2	Caen	Bordeaux
18:00				Stadium: Stade Chaban-Delmas; Attendance: 21,852

19 February 2011 24	Lorient	5-1	Bordeaux	Lorient
20:00				Stadium: Stade du Moustoir; Attendance: 15,513

26 February 2011 25	Bordeaux	3-0	Auxerre	Bordeaux
20:00				Stadium: Stade Chaban-Delmas; Attendance: 23,105

6 March 2011 26	Brest	1-3	Bordeaux	Brest
16:00				Stadium: Stade Francis-Le Blé; Attendance: 14,034

13 March 2011 27	Bordeaux	0-1	Monaco	Bordeaux
16:00				Stadium: Stade Chaban-Delmas; Attendance: 26,811

19 March 2011 28	Valenciennes	2-2	Bordeaux	Valenciennes
18:00				Stadium: Stade du Hainaut; Attendance: 11,072

2 April 2011 29	Nancy	0-0	Bordeaux	Nancy
18:00				Stadium: Stade Marcel Picot; Attendance: 19,022

9 April 2011 30	Bordeaux	0-0	Arles-Avignon	Bordeaux
18:00				Stadium: Stade Chaban-Delmas; Attendance: 24,250

16 April 2011 31	Lille	1-1	Bordeaux	Lille
20:00				Stadium: Stade Pierre-Mauroy; Attendance: 17,069

24 April 2011 32	Bordeaux	2-0	Saint-Étienne	Bordeaux
16:00				Stadium: Stade Chaban-Delmas; Attendance: 29,657

30 April 2011 33	Rennes	0-0	Bordeaux	Rennes
18:00				Stadium: Roazhon Park; Attendance: 22,010

7 May 2011 34	Bordeaux	0-4	Sochaux	Bordeaux
18:00				Stadium: Stade Chaban-Delmas; Attendance: 24,143

11 May 2011 35	Lens	0-1	Bordeaux	Lens
18:00				Stadium: Stade Bollaert-Delelis; Attendance: 28,209

18 May 2011 36	Bordeaux	1-0	Paris SG	Bordeaux
18:00				Stadium: Stade Chaban-Delmas; Attendance: 25,648

21 May 2011 37	Toulouse	0-0	Bordeaux	Toulouse
20:00				Stadium: Stadium de Toulouse; Attendance: 19,272

29 May 2011 38	Bordeaux	2-0	Montpellier	Bordeaux
20:00				Stadium: Stade Chaban-Delmas; Attendance: 29,317

=== Coupe de France ===
8 January 2011 Round of 64	Bordeaux	3–1	Rouen	Bordeaux
16:45 CET (UTC+1)				Stadium: Stade Chaban-Delmas

22 January 2011 Round of 32	Angers	1–0	Bordeaux	Angers
17:45 CET (UTC+1)				Stadium: Stade Raymond Kopa

=== Coupe de la Ligue ===
22 September 2010 Third Round	Nancy	1-2	Bordeaux	Tomblaine
20:45 CET (UTC+1)				Stadium: Stade Marcel-Picot

26 October 2010 Round of 16	Saint-Étienne	1–0	Bordeaux	Saint-Étienne
20:45 CET (UTC+1)				Stadium: Stade Geoffroy-Guichard
