= Perón: apuntes para una biografía =

- Directed by: Jorge Coscia
- Written by: Jorge Coscia
- Edited by: Celeste Maidana, Liliana Nadal
- Music by: José Luis Castiñeira
- Release date: November 18, 2010 (Buenos Aires)
- Running time: 85 minutes
- Country: Argentina
- Language: Spanish

Perón: apuntes para una biografía (Spanish: Perón: Notes for a biography) is a 2010 Argentine documentary film about Juan Domingo Perón. It features a number of Argentine historians like Norberto Galasso, and it is focused mainly in Perón early life and his intervention in the Revolution of '43. His government is described in a brief summary at the end, and it doesn't reference his life after the Revolución Libertadora military coup that ousted him from power. It is written and directed by the Argentine secretary of culture, Jorge Coscia. It is the eight biography film produced by Caras y Caretas.

The film includes old photos, video archives, recordings at key sites of his early life and interviews with historians.

== See also ==
- Early life of Juan Perón
