= Yannick Rott =

French footballer (born 1974)

Personal information
- Date of birth: 27 September 1974 (age 52)
- Place of birth: Schiltigheim, France
- Height: 1.75 m (5 ft 9 in)
- Position: Defender

Senior career*
| Years | Team | Apps | (Gls) |
| 1992–1998 | Strasbourg | 140 | (1) |
| 1998–2000 | Toulouse | 38 | (0) |
| 2000–2003 | Créteil | 28 | (0) |
| 2003–2004 | Gazélec Ajaccio | 24 | (0) |
| 2004–2006 | Gap | 45 | (0) |
| 2006–2008 | Fréjus | 21 | (0) |
| 2008–2009 | Muret | ? | (?) |

International career
- France U-21
- * Club domestic league appearances and goals

Yannick Rott (born 27 September 1974) is a French former professional footballer who played as a defender. Whilst at Strasbourg he won the 1995 UEFA Intertoto Cup and the Coupe de la Ligue in 1997, playing in the final.
