= Battle of Alcantra =

1839 battle

Battle of Acajete
Date	3 – 4 October 1839
Location	Alcantra, Alamo River
Result	Insurgent victory

Belligerents
Centralists	Insurgents

Commanders and leaders
José Ignacio Pavón	Antonio Canales Rosillo

Strength
Unknown	Unknown

Casualties and losses
Unknown	Unknown

The Battle of Alcantra was fought at Alcantra, on the Alamo River on 3–4 October 1839 between insurgents under the command of General Antonio Canales Rosillo, and Centerists under the command of General José Ignacio Pavón. The insurgents won decisive victory which led to Pavón being replaced by General Mariano Arista.
