= Marco Simone =

Italian footballer and manager (born 1969)

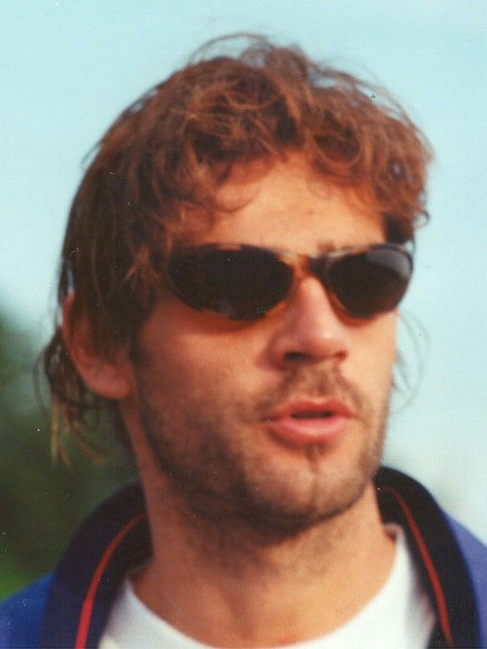
- Simone in early 2000s

Personal information
- Date of birth: 7 January 1969 (age 57)
- Place of birth: Castellanza, Italy
- Height: 1.70 m (5 ft 7 in)
- Positions: Striker; winger

Senior career*
Years	Team	Apps	(Gls)
1986–1989	Como	36	(6)
1987–1988	→ Virescit Boccaleone (loan)	33	(15)
1989–1997	AC Milan	168	(49)
1997–1999	Paris Saint-Germain	59	(22)
1999–2001	Monaco	69	(28)
2001–2002	AC Milan	9	(1)
2002–2003	Monaco	5	(0)
2004	Nice	7	(0)
2005–2006	Legnano	1	(0)
Total		387	(120)

International career
1988–1990	Italy U21	16	(7)
1992–1996	Italy	4	(0)

Managerial career
- 2011–2012: Monaco
- 2014–2015: Lausanne-Sport
- 2015–2016: Tours
- 2016–2017: Laval
- 2017–2018: Club Africain
- 2019: Ratchaburi Mitr Phol
- 2019: Mohammédia
- 2021: Châteauroux
- * Club domestic league appearances and goals

Marco Simone (Italian pronunciation: [ˈmarko siˈmoːne]; born 7 January 1969) is an Italian professional football manager and former player. As a player, he was a striker and winger.

He most prominently played for Milan, with whom he won four Serie A championships and two UEFA Champions League titles, as well as in France's Ligue 1 for Paris Saint-Germain and Monaco. At international level, Simone played four games for the Italy national team.

As a manager, Simone has coached Monaco, Tours, Laval and Châteauroux. He also had brief spells in Switzerland, Tunisia, Thailand and Morocco.

== Club career ==
=== Early career ===
Simone was born in Castellanza. He debuted in Serie A for Como on 11 January 1987. After a few appearances in the top-flight Serie A, he was put on loan at Virescit Boccaleone in the secondary Serie C1 league. He scored 15 goals for Virescit in the 1987–88 season, and finished as top scorer of the Serie C1 league.

He returned to Como for the 1988–89 Serie A season, in which he scored 6 goals. Como finished dead last in the tournament, and was relegated to Serie B.

=== AC Milan ===
In the summer of 1989, Simone was brought into the squad of third-place finishers AC Milan by manager Arrigo Sacchi. His stay at Milan would be long and successful, as he won the 1990 European Cup under manager Sacchi, as well as four Serie A titles in five years from 1992 to 1996 and the 1994 UEFA Champions League under the management of Fabio Capello.

His best season for AC Milan came during the 1994–95 Serie A season, where he scored 17 goals in 30 games, as well as 4 in the Champions League, for a total of 21 goals in all competitions, as Milan reached the 1995 UEFA Champions League final, only to be defeated by Ajax. He also managed 11 goals in all competitions during the 1995–96 season, 8 of which came in Serie A, finishing as the club's second highest goalscorer behind George Weah as Milan won the Serie A title. Despite competing for the attacking spots at Milan with the three FIFA World Player of the Year award winners Marco van Basten (1992), Roberto Baggio (1993) and George Weah (1995) (as well as the presence of Ruud Gullit, Dejan Savićević, Daniele Massaro, Paolo Di Canio, Jean-Pierre Papin, Christophe Dugarry, and Brian Laudrup), he scored a total of 74 goals in 245 games in all competitions for Milan.

=== Later career in France, Monaco and return to Italy ===
In 1997, Simone moved abroad to play for French club Paris Saint-Germain, with whom he won both domestic cups in his first season. He scored in both the Coupe de la Ligue final and the Coupe de France final against Bordeaux and Lens respectively. He transferred to Monaco in 1999. He scored 21 goals and made 15 assists in 34 games during the 1999–2000 season, and helped Monaco win the Ligue 1 championship in 2000. He returned to Milan for parts of the 2001–02 Serie A season, scoring his last goal with the Rossoneri in Coppa Italia against Lazio in 2002. He returned to Monaco, but rarely played during the 2002–03 Ligue 1 season.

Following an unsuccessful season playing for Nice, he retired from football in 2004, at the age of 35. He made a short come-back as he played a single game for Serie C2 club Legnano in 2005.

== International career ==
During his time with Milan, Simone also made his senior debut for the Italy national team on 19 December 1992, under then national team manager Arrigo Sacchi, in a 2–1 away win in a 1994 World Cup qualifier against Malta. He would go on to play four games in total for the national team between 1992 and 1996, but did not score any goals for Italy.

== Style of play ==
Simone was a diminutive forward, gifted with pace, good movement, an eye for goal, and excellent technique. He was capable of playing in several attacking positions, and was best used as a second striker, due to his small stature and slender physical build, although he was also capable of playing in a central role as a main striker, or even as a winger.

== Managerial career ==
=== Monaco ===
On 12 September 2011, Simone got his first managerial job at former club Monaco, succeeding Laurent Banide at a club 17th in Ligue 2. He was fired at the end of the season with the club having finished 8th and not met their aim of instant promotion, despite the investment of billionaire new owner Dmitry Rybolovlev.

=== Lausanne-Sport ===
Simone became Technical Director at Lausanne-Sport of the Swiss Challenge League in November 2013, and 11 months later he replaced Francesco Gabriele as manager. He was sacked on 24 March 2015 with the team in seventh having earned one point from six games in the calendar year.

=== Tours and Laval ===
On 25 June 2015, Simone returned to France's second tier with Tours FC. He finished the season in 9th, and quit despite having a year left on his contract, due to disputes with the board.

Still in the same league, Simone was hired at 18th-placed Laval on 8 November 2016. The following 11 April he was dismissed, with the team in last position.

=== Club Africain ===
In July 2017, Simone joined Club Africain in Tunisia. Four months into a two-year contract, he quit the 12th-placed club. Through FIFA, he sued the club for the remainder of his salary, and won €630,000 in July 2019. In April 2018 he was one of 77 applicants for the vacant Cameroon national team job.

=== Ratchaburi Mitr Phol and Mohammédia ===
Simone became manager of the Thai Premier League's Ratchaburi Mitr Phol F.C. on 25 March 2019. He left in July, with a record of eight wins from 18 games, as he said he had an offer from a European club. He instead joined SCC Mohammédia in Morocco's Botola 2. Within another four months, he was dismissed despite the team leading the league, and refused a backroom job with the club.

=== Châteauroux ===
On 10 March 2021, Simone became the manager of Ligue 2 club Châteauroux. He was appointed following the takeover by Saudi prince Abdullah bin Musa'ad bin Abdulaziz Al Saud and his United World Group. Châteauroux was in last place at the time he was hired, and remained in that position until the end of the season, getting relegated to the third-tier Championnat National. He was fired by Châteauroux on 11 October 2021, following a home loss to Concarneau, with the club in the middle of the table.

== Career statistics ==
=== Club ===
Appearances and goals by club, season and competition
Club	Season	League			National cup (Note: Includes Coppa Italia, Coupe de France)		League cup (Note: Includes Coupe de la Ligue)		Europe		Other		Total	
Club	Season	Division	Apps	Goals	Apps	Goals	Apps	Goals	Apps	Goals	Apps	Goals	Apps	Goals
Milan	1989–90	Serie A	21	1	3	1	–		5 (Note: Appearances in European Cup)	1	3 (Note: One appearance in Intercontinental Cup, two appearances in European Super Cup)	0	32	3
Milan	1990–91	Serie A	14	4	6	2	–		2	0	–		22	6
Milan	1991–92	Serie A	15	7	4	1	–		–		–		19	8
Milan	1992–93	Serie A	13	5	4	0	–		8 (Note: Appearances in UEFA Champions League)	4	–		25	9
Milan	1993–94	Serie A	25	3	1	0	–		7	2	1 (Note: Appearance in Supercoppa Italiana)	1	34	6
Milan	1994–95	Serie A	30	17	3	0	–		9	4	3 (Note: One appearance in Intercontinental Cup, one appearance in European Super Cup, one appearance in Supercoppa Italiana)	0	45	21
Milan	1995–96	Serie A	27	8	3	1	–		5 (Note: Appearances in UEFA Cup)	2	–		35	11
Milan	1996–97	Serie A	23	4	3	2	–		6	4	1	0	33	10
Milan	Total		168	49	27	7	–		42	17	8	1	245	74
Paris Saint-Germain	1997–98	Division 1	28	13	3	2	4	3	6	4	–		41	22
Paris Saint-Germain	1998–99	Division 1	31	9	1	0	2	0	2 (Note: Appearances in UEFA Cup Winners' Cup)	1	1 (Note: Appearance in Trophée des Champions)	0	37	10
Paris Saint-Germain	Total		59	22	4	2	6	3	8	5	1	0	78	32
Monaco	1999–2000	Division 1	34	21	2	1	2	0	7	6	–		45	28
Monaco	2000–01	Division 1	30	7	1	0	5	3	6	6	1	0	43	16
Monaco	2001–02	Division 1	5	0	0	0	0	0	0	0	–		5	0
Monaco	Total		69	28	3	1	7	3	13	12	1	0	93	44
Milan	2001–02	Serie A	9	0	3	1	–		3	0	–		15	1
Monaco	2002–03	Ligue 1	5	0	0	0	0	0	0	0	–		5	0
Career total			310	99	37	11	13	6	66	34	10	1	436	151

=== International ===
Appearances and goals by national team and year
National team	Year	Apps	Goals
Italy	1992	1	0
Italy	1993	0	0
Italy	1994	0	0
Italy	1995	2	0
Italy	1996	1	0
Total		4	0

== Honours ==
AC Milan

- Serie A: 1991–92, 1992–93, 1993–94, 1995–96
- Supercoppa Italiana: 1993, 1994
- European Cup/UEFA Champions League: 1989–90, 1993–94
- European Super Cup: 1989, 1994
- Intercontinental Cup: 1989

Paris Saint-Germain

- Coupe de France: 1997–98
- Coupe de la Ligue: 1997–98
- Trophée des Champions: 1998

Monaco

- French Division 1: 1999–2000
- Trophée des Champions: 2000

Individual

- Serie C1 top-scorer: 1987–88 (15 goals)
- Ligue 1 Player of the Year: 1998
- France Football's Best Foreign Player in France: 1997–98, 1999–2000
- AC Milan Hall of Fame
