= Kaba Diawara =

Guinean football manager (born 1975)

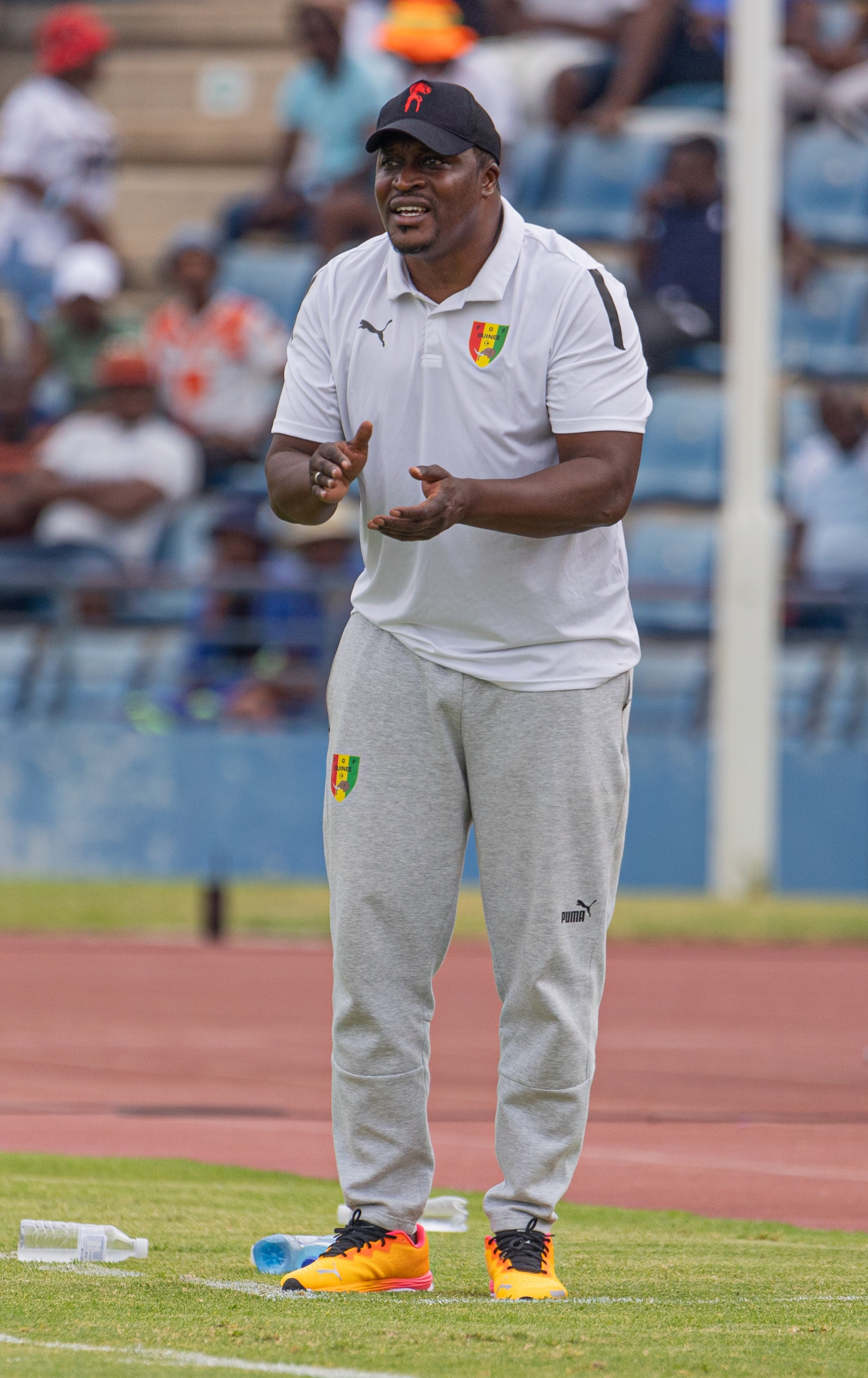
- Diawara in 2023 with Guinea

Personal information
- Full name: Kaba Diawara
- Date of birth: 16 December 1975 (age 50)
- Place of birth: Toulon, Var, France
- Height: 1.83 m (6 ft 0 in)
- Position: Striker

Senior career*
Years	Team	Apps	(Gls)
1993–1994	Toulon	40	(11)
1994–1999	Bordeaux	60	(14)
1998	→ Rennes (loan)	12	(1)
1999	Arsenal	12	(0)
1999–2000	Marseille	15	(0)
2000–2003	Paris Saint-Germain	14	(0)
2000	→ Blackburn Rovers (loan)	5	(0)
2000–2001	→ West Ham United (loan)	11	(0)
2002	→ Racing Ferrol (loan)	15	(5)
2002–2003	→ Nice (loan)	37	(12)
2003–2004	Al-Gharrafa	?	(?)
2005	Al-Kharitiyath	?	(?)
2005–2006	Ajaccio	20	(2)
2006–2007	Gaziantepspor	27	(8)
2008	Ankaragücü	12	(1)
2008–2009	Alki Larnaca	11	(3)
2009–2011	Arles-Avignon	50	(8)
Total		341	(65)

International career
2004	France U21		
2004–2009	Guinea	30	(11)

Managerial career
- 2021–2024: Guinea
- * Club domestic league appearances and goals

Kaba Diawara (born 16 December 1975) is a football manager and former player who played as a striker.

Diawara played for French teams Sporting Toulon, Bordeaux, Rennes, Marseille, Nice, Paris Saint-Germain and Arles-Avignon, for English clubs Blackburn Rovers, West Ham United and Arsenal, and for clubs in Spain and Turkey. Diawara was born in France and represented the country at under-21 level before playing senior international football for Guinea.

== Club career ==
=== Beginnings in France ===
Born in Toulon, Var, Diawara at first played in 1993 for Toulon and then journeyed to Bordeaux a year later. With Bordeaux, he played in the 1997 Coupe de la Ligue Final. After six years at the club, he moved to Premier League club Arsenal in January 1999. Six months after he left Bordeaux they won the 1999 Division 1 title.

=== Premier League ===
He made his debut for Arsenal on 31 January 1999 in a league match against Chelsea. He went on to make 15 appearances for Arsenal, 12 of which were in the league, but failed to score as Arsenal were involved in an ultimately unsuccessful title race with Manchester United.

=== Return to France ===
During the summer of 1999, Diawara returned to France and signed for Marseille. He stayed at Marseille for six months and in January 2000 he signed for club rival Paris St Germain with whom he played in the 2000 Coupe de la Ligue Final.

=== Return to England ===
In the summer of 2000, he was linked with a return to England with Premier League side Everton, however they re-signed Duncan Ferguson instead. However, he did return to England when in August 2000 he joined Division One side Blackburn Rovers on loan. At Blackburn, he scored his first and only goal in English football, in a League Cup tie with Rochdale. After his loan at Blackburn finished, he then joined Premier League side West Ham United on loan for the rest of the 2000-01 season.

=== Later career ===
After returning to Paris St Germain, he had further loan spells at Racing Ferrol and Nice.

In the 2006–07 season, he transferred to Süper Lig team Gaziantepspor. At Gaziantepspor he got little playing time. As such, in January 2008, he signed a six-month contract with fellow Turkish side Ankaragücü. In August 2008, he moved to Alki Larnaca of Cyprus. He was eventually released by Larnaca in December of that year. Diawara then signed for French side Arles-Avignon on a free transfer in 2009. At Avignon, Diawara went on to bring an end to his playing days.

== International career ==
Diawara played for the French national U-21 team, but chose to represent Guinea at senior level. Diawara was then called up to Guinea's squad for the 2006 African Cup of Nations. Guinea went on to the quarterfinals of the tournament against where Diawara scored in an eventual 3–2 defeat to Senegal.

== Coaching career ==
In October 2021, Diawara was named as head coach of the Guinea national football team, replacing former French international Didier Six.

== Personal life ==
After retirement, Diawara became a football pundit with French network Canal +.

== Honours ==
Bordeaux

- Division 1: 1998–99
- Coupe de la Ligue runner-up: 1996–97

Paris Saint-Germain

- Coupe de la Ligue runner-up: 1999–2000
