= Jan Suchopárek =

Czech footballer (born 1969)

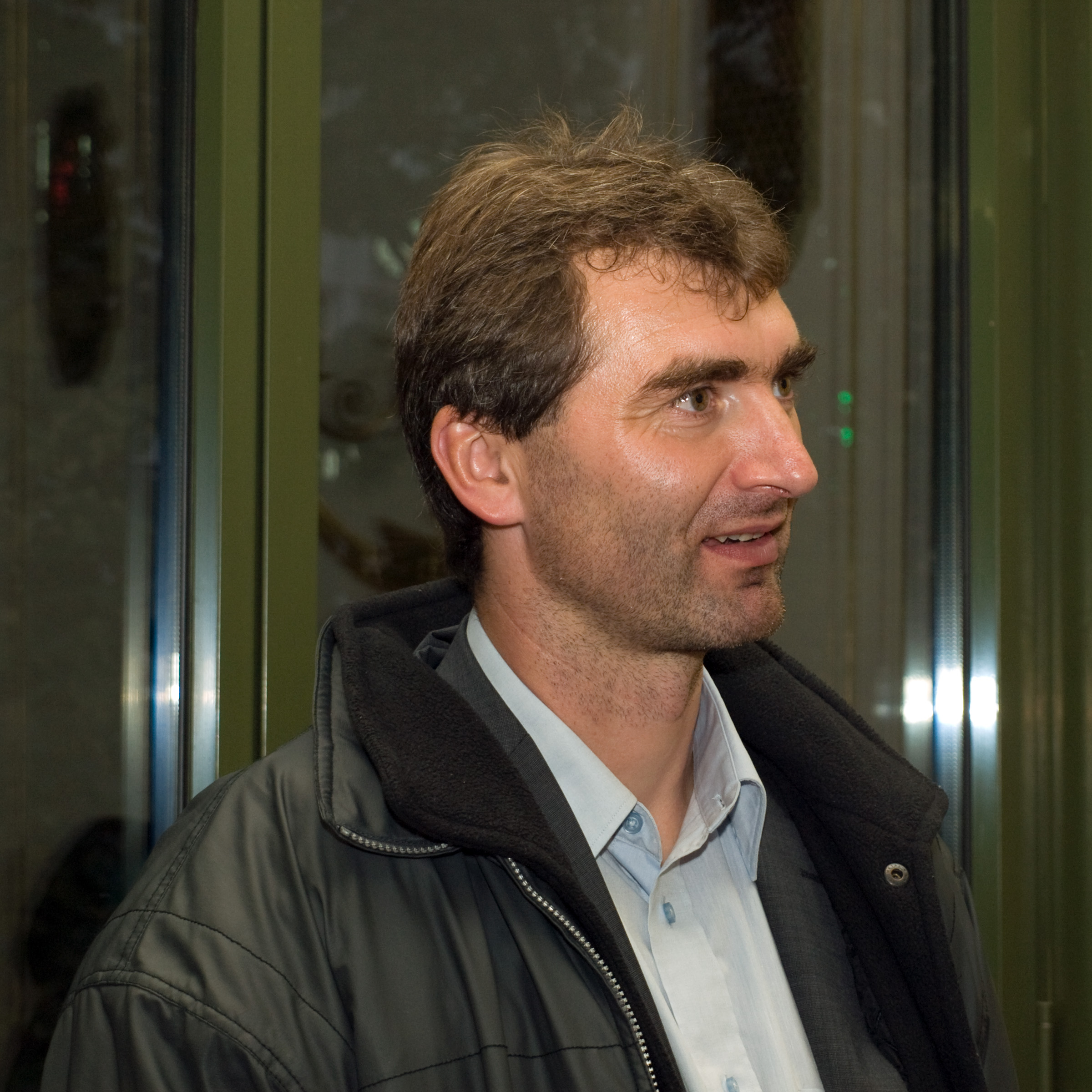
- Suchopárek in 2010

Personal information
- Date of birth: 23 September 1969 (age 57)
- Place of birth: Kladno, Czechoslovakia
- Height: 1.86 m (6 ft 1 in)
- Position: Defender

Youth career
- 1974–1988: Poldi Kladno

Senior career*
Years	Team	Apps	(Gls)
1988–1991	Dukla Prague	66	(7)
1991–1996	Slavia Prague	132	(24)
1996–1999	Strasbourg	76	(1)
1999–2000	Tennis Borussia Berlin	23	(1)
2000–2003	Slavia Prague	17	(0)
2003–2005	Kladno	51	(9)
Total		365	(42)

International career
1990–1992	Czechoslovakia U21	14	(1)
1991–1993	Czechoslovakia	13	(0)
1994–2000	Czech Republic	48	(4)

Managerial career
- 2003–2010: Kladno (youth)
- 2010–2016: Dukla Prague (assistant)
- 2016–2017: Czech Republic U19
- 2017–2018: Czech Republic U18
- 2018–2019: Czech Republic U19
- 2019–2020: Czech Republic U18
- 2020–2021: Czech Republic U19
- 2021–2025: Czech Republic U21
- 2025–2026: Czech Republic (assistant)
Medal record
Men's football
Representing Czech Republic
UEFA European Championship
Runner-up	1996 England
- * Club domestic league appearances and goals

Jan Suchopárek (born 23 September 1969) is a Czech football coach and former defender.

He played for Czechoslovakia and later the Czech Republic, playing a combined total of 61 international matches, scoring four goals. Suchopárek was a participant at UEFA Euro 1996, where the Czech Republic won the silver medal. He scored in the group stage against Russia and played in the UEFA Euro 1996 Final, where the Czech Republic lost to Germany.

At club level, Suchopárek played for Prague teams Dukla and Slavia before moving to France, where he played for RC Strasbourg, and Germany, for Tennis Borussia Berlin. He finished his career in the Czech Second League, where he played for Kladno.

As a coach, Suchopárek took roles at Kladno (youth coach) and Dukla Prague (assistant coach) before moving into the Czech Republic national youth teams. He served as head coach of the Czech Republic U21 national team from 2021 to 2025, leading the side to the group stage of the final tournament in the 2023 and 2025 European Championships.

== Club career ==
=== Early career ===
Suchopárek was born in Kladno. He played in the Czechoslovak First League for Dukla Prague between 1988 and 1991, during which time the club won the Czech and Czechoslovak Cup in the 1989–90 season. He then moved on to Slavia Prague, where he played from 1991 to 1996. In this time he captained the title-winning team in the 1995–96 Czech First League.

=== France and Germany ===
Suchopárek was one of four players from the Czech squad at UEFA Euro 1996 who left the Czech Republic to play in another country after the tournament, signing for RC Strasbourg in July 1996. He played for three years in France with Strasbourg.

In August 1999, Suchopárek was one of seven players signed by manager Winfried Schäfer of German 2. Bundesliga side Tennis Borussia Berlin. He scored his only league goal that season in a 2–2 draw against Borussia Mönchengladbach on 8 November 1999. Suchopárek went on to record 23 league appearances in the 1999–2000 season, but had meniscus surgery in April 2000, curtailing his season.

=== Return to the Czech Republic ===
Suchopárek returned to the Czech Republic to play for Slavia Prague again in October 2000.

Suchopárek captained Slavia during his second spell. He had surgery in March 2001 following a tear of meniscus, being the second knee operation he had within a year. In 2001, following Slavia's exit from the 2001–02 UEFA Cup in the first round, Suchopárek was sent to the "B" team of Slavia due to inadequate performances.

He later moved to SK Kladno to finish his playing career in the Czech 2. Liga. While playing for Kladno in 2004, Suchopárek dislocated his shoulder attempting a bicycle kick.

Suchopárek retired from professional football following the end of the 2004–05 Czech 2. Liga, in which Kladno finished fourth and missed promotion to the Czech First League on the last day of the season.

== International career ==
Suchopárek made his international debut in 1991 for Czechoslovakia, having started playing for the nation's under-21 side the year before. He made his senior debut against Norway on 25 September 1991 in a friendly match which finished 3–2 to Czechoslovakia.

=== UEFA Euro 1996 ===
Suchopárek played in the Czech Republic's opening game of the UEFA Euro 1996 tournament, a loss to Germany. He picked up a yellow card in the next group match against Italy, which the Czechs won against expectations, by a 2–1 scoreline. Suchopárek scored with a header in the last group match against Russia, which finished 3–3 and meant that the Czech Republic advanced to the quarter-finals of the tournament.

Suchopárek was shown the yellow card in the first minute of the quarter-final match against Portugal, which the Czechs went on to win 1–0 thanks to a Karel Poborský strike. As this was his second yellow card of the tournament, Suchopárek was one of four Czech players to miss the semi-final clash with France due to suspension. He returned to the team for the final against Germany, although again the Germans prevailed, winning 2–1 thanks to a golden goal in extra time.

Following Euro 1996, Suchopárek continued to represent his national team, playing the complete 90 minutes of seven consecutive games in UEFA Euro 2000 qualifying. However, despite the Czech Republic qualifying, Suchopárek missed the UEFA Euro 2000 tournament due to a knee injury.

== Coaching career ==
During his time at Kladno, Suchopárek started studying for the UEFA Pro Licence, which he completed after two years.

Following his playing career, Suchopárek became a coach at SK Kladno, where he remained until 2010, when he moved to FK Dukla Prague to become assistant to Luboš Kozel. He is also a coach for the Czech Republic U21 national team. At the end of the 2015–16 season, Suchopárek left Dukla, along with Kozel, following the expiry of their contracts. He was named new head coach of the Czech Republic U19, replacing Pavel Malura.

Suchopárek led the U21 national team in two major tournaments. His side were eliminated in the group stage of the 2023 UEFA European Under-21 Championship after a loss against Israel, during which he rested a number of key players. He again led the side at the 2025 UEFA European Under-21 Championship, leaving his role after his side's elimination in the group stage.

== Career statistics ==
=== International ===
Appearances and goals by national team and year
National team	Year	Apps	Goals
Czechoslovakia	1991	3	0
Czechoslovakia	1992	4	0
Czechoslovakia	1993	6	0
Czech Republic	1994	8	1
Czech Republic	1995	7	1
Czech Republic	1996	11	2
Czech Republic	1997	5	0
Czech Republic	1998	8	0
Czech Republic	1999	8	0
Czech Republic	2000	1	0
Total		61	4

Results list the Czech Republic's goal tally first.

List of international goals scored by Jan Suchopárek
No.	Date	Venue	Opponent	Result	Competition
1	5 June 1994	Lansdowne Road, Dublin, Ireland	Republic of Ireland	3–1	Friendly
2	16 August 1995	Ullevaal Stadion, Oslo, Norway	Norway	1–1	Euro 1996 qualifying
3	26 March 1996	Městský stadion, Ostrava, Czech Republic	Turkey	3–0	Friendly
4	19 June 1996	Anfield, Liverpool, England	Russia	3–3	Euro 1996

== Honours ==
Dukla Prague

- Czechoslovak Cup: 1989–90

Slavia Prague

- Czech First League: 1995–96
- Czech Cup: 2001–02

Strasbourg

- Coupe de la Ligue: 1997

Czech Republic

- UEFA European Championship runners-up: 1996
