= Early life of Juan Perón =

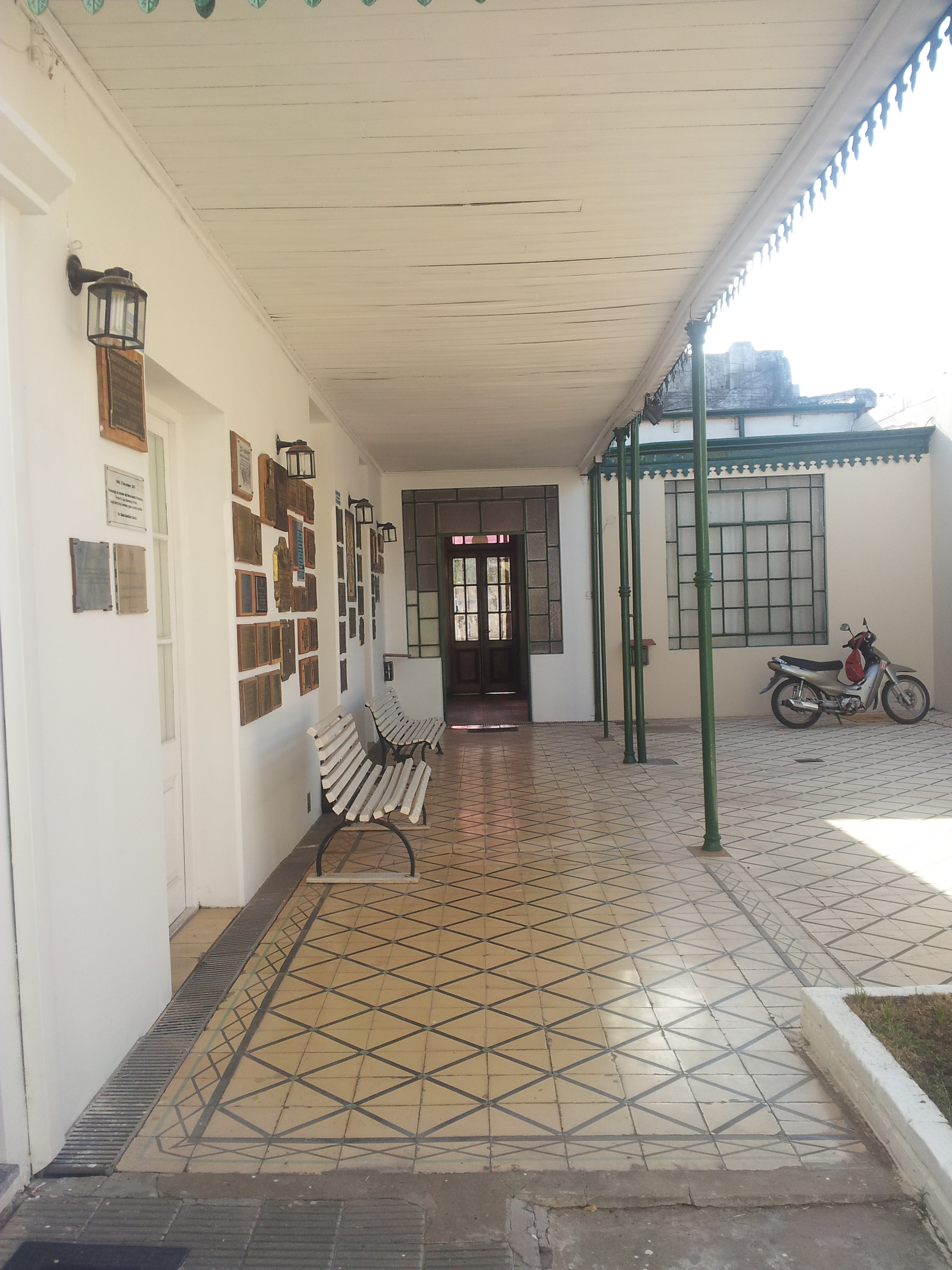
Patio inside the home where Perón was born in 1895

Juan Domingo Perón was an Argentine military officer and politician, who served three times as President of Argentina.

== Birth controversy ==
Perón's date and place of birth (October 8, 1895, in Lobos) are disputed by recent investigations by Hipólito Barreiro, who suggests October 7, 1893, in Roque Pérez.

Juan Domingo Perón was the son of Mario Tomás Perón and Juana Sosa. Their first son was Avelino Mario, born on November 30, 1891, in Lobos. Mario and Juana began to cohabitate the following year, in a house built in Roque Pérez (a small village near Lobos). They had a new son on October 7, 1893, named Juan, but they did not report the birth in Lobos. Mario reported his birth on October 8, 1895, as if Juan had been born the previous day. He added the middle name "Domingo" after the late Dominga Dutey de Perón, Juan's paternal grandmother. Oddly enough, the birth certificate reports only Juan's father, and not his mother.

Mario and Juana were not married, and their relationship was not stable. In 1894 Mario acknowledged only Avelino as his natural son, and Juan was baptized in 1895 as the son of Juana, without mention of Mario. Mario and Juana finally got married on September 25, 1901, and acknowledged both Avelino and Juan as their natural sons.

Juan Domingo Perón attended elementary school without problems, despite his complex legal situation. However, his grandmother feared in 1910 that he would not be accepted by the military school. Under the highly strict social customs of the time, an illegitimate son would not be accepted by the military, nor a child with indigenous ancestry. Juana Sosa was the daughter of a Tehuelche father and a Quechua mother. So, with the help of social relations of her late husband, she forged a birth certificate that would allow Juan to pass the requirements.

== Military career ==
Perón passed the exams to join the National Military College by the end of 1910, and was accepted by March 1911. He had no problems adapting to military discipline. The Argentine army was highly Germanophile, an influence that began about 1904 (predating the World Wars) and was based on not a rejection of democracy but an admiration of German military history. By his first year in college, Perón had chosen the infantry. He began boxing training as well, besides his military career, but he gave up after a bad punch injured the metacarpal bones in his hand.

There were political discussions in Argentina by this time about the implementation of universal suffrage, promoted by the Radical Civic Union and resisted by the governments, until it was sanctioned by the Sáenz Peña Law in 1912. It is unknown whether Perón had specific political views about these topics, but the usual isolation of military service, his weak family relations, and the unlikely political concerns of his grandmother and aunts (as few women were concerned about politics at the time) suggest that Perón focused his mind only on military topics. He distrusted the lessons of history, as he noticed that it focused on circumstantial details about José de San Martín's life as a moral example but did not analyze his reasons for leaving South America and spending his last years in Europe.

Basic training ended in 1913, with a military exercise conducted near Concordia, Entre Ríos. The exercise was organized by Agustín Pedro Justo and generated a press scandal as he left the army stationed in the open during the summer noon day sun. Half the recruits fainted of heatstroke, eventually the formation gave up the exercise and took the fainted recruits to Concordia's hospital. Perón became a sub lieutenant on December 18, 1913, and was assigned to Regiment 12 in Parana.

He was promoted to lieutenant in December 1915, and Regiment 12 moved to Santa Fe, serving under Bartolomé Descalzo. He voted for Hipólito Yrigoyen in the 1916 presidential elections. He was appointed to the Esteban de Luca Unit in 1918, in Buenos Aires.

=== Tragic Week ===
There was a massive riot in January 1919 in Buenos Aires, known as the Tragic Week. A large number of anarchist workers started the riot, which was fought by both the police and the army. Historians disagree on Perón's precise role during those events: Peronist historians try to negate, conceal, or justify his intervention, and anti-Peronist historians view it as contradictory with his future ideas. Enrique Pavón Pereyra, a Peronist, wrote that Perón was located in Santa Fe province at the time and moved to Buenos Aires by mid-1919 and thus was absent from the events. However, his military records date his return to Buenos Aires in 1918 and his return to Santa Fe in February 1919, after the riots. Tomás Eloy Martínez, an anti-Peronist, conducted an interview with Perón that confirmed his intervention but that he used only the supply of ammunition that was present. Martínez had a later interview with Vicente Carlos Aloé, the governor of Buenos Aires Province during Perón's second presidency, suggesting that Perón was actively involved in the repression. However, Martínez did not check the validity of Aloé's claims. Aloé was not a direct witness of the event and did not know Perón until years later.

As a military man, it was unlikely that Perón supported the rioters because anarchism calls for the disestablishment of the government and the armed forces and rejects nationalism. However, he made sympathetic comments about the riot years later but rejected the anarchist or communist affiliation of the rioters and considered them as mere workers.

=== Contact with labor conflicts ===
Perón returned to Regiment 12 in Santa Fe the following February. There were labor conflicts at the north of the province, where the British Forestal Land, Timber and Railways Company faced the first local strike action. Employees asked for better wages, the end of unjustified dismissals, and an eight-hour workday. The company rallied a band of thugs to attack the strikers, arranged blackouts, cut the water supply, and closed the single warehouse in the area. When Perón arrived there, the laborers explained the events. He then met with the warehouse owner, who refused to open it and claimed that the timber company was the only authority in the area. Perón resorted to a death threat to have the warehouse opened.

There was a new strike in December 1919. Although Perón also mediated that conflict, the details of his intervention are unknown. He returned to Buenos Aires in 1920 as a first lieutenant. He was assigned to Santiago del Estero.

=== Sargento Cabral Military School ===
Perón joined the Sargento Cabral Military School on January 16, 1920, with good qualifications. He was paternalistic towards the soldiers under his command. He wrote many chapters of the Applicant's Manual, which was published by the army in 1924 and was his first published work. He was promoted to captain in December 1924, and Commander of the First Company of Infantry in 1925. In his spare time, he enjoyed practicing swordsmanship, polo, and basketball.

== First wife ==
Perón's first wife was Aurelia Tizón, a school teacher. When they met, Perón was aged 30 and Aurelia 23. Her middle-class family belonged to the Radical Civic Union. She was highly religious and had interests in the English and French languages, geography, history, and the arts. Perón took her to see movies and visited her family house. The relation helped him to reduce the machismo influence of his military life.

Peron continued both his military career, his history studies, and his romantic relation with Aurelia. Mario Perón, who was very ill, moved from Patagonia to Buenos Aires with Juana, and Juan Perón moved to live with his parents during their last years. By then, Perón was engaged to Aurelia. Mario died on November 10, 1928, a few days before Juan and Aurelia's wedding. They married in a private ceremony on January 5, 1929.

Juana returned to Patagonia with her son Mario Avelino (who visited Buenos Aires for his father's funeral); Juan Perón would have little contact with them afterwards. Juan and Aurelia had a brief honeymoon in Bariloche and returned to Buenos Aires.

== Infamous Decade ==
Hipólito Yrigoyen was elected for a second term as president in 1928. He was supported by the poor people and rejected by the conservatives and the press. In January 1929, Perón became an appointed official under the command of Francisco Fasola Castaño. Perón and Castaño made a trip to visit to the Andes in Patagonia.

When he returned, Yrigoyen was facing an even greater political crisis fostered by the economic crisis caused by the Great Depression, which started in the United States. The army began to plot against Yrigoyen, and Perón was invited to the discussions by Ángel Solari. Solari was aligned with José Félix Uriburu, one of the heads of the Argentine military in those years, the other being Agustín Pedro Justo. Perón had a positive view of Uriburu but did not trust some of Uriburu's allies and feared that the military plot had no clear ideas or notable support (hardly more than 20 members of the top military).

In later years, he would completely regret his role in the military plot and point out that he had focused only on his military career and that most of the military joined in it solely out of obedience to orders from superior officers.

== Bibliography ==
- Galasso, Norberto (2006). Perón: Formación, ascenso y caída (1893-1955). Buenos Aires: Colihue. ISBN 950-581-399-6.
