= 1997–98 Coupe de la Ligue =

French League Cup

Tournament details
- Country: France
- Dates: 11 November 1997 – 4 April 1998
- Teams: 43

Final positions
- Champions: Paris Saint-Germain (2nd title)
- Runners-up: Bordeaux

Tournament statistics
- Matches played: 42
- Goals scored: 124 (2.95 per match)
- Top goal scorer: Stéphane Guivarc'h (7 goals)

The 1997–98 Coupe de la Ligue began on 11 November 1997 and the final took place on 4 April 1998 at the Stade de France. Strasbourg were the defending champions, but were knocked-out by Cannes in the Second round. Paris Saint-Germain went on to win the tournament, beating Bordeaux 4–2 on penalties in the final.

== First round ==
The matches were played on 11, 25 November, 16 and 17 December 1997.

Team 1	Score	Team 2
Lorient	3–1	Red Star
Wasquehal	0–3	Nancy
Beauvais	1–0	Angers
Nîmes	3–0	Louhans-Cuiseaux
Gueugnon	3–2	Valence
Le Mans	3–2	Amiens
Niort	2–0	Troyes
Martigues	1–0	Toulon
Lille	2–2 (a.e.t.) (3–2 p)	Caen
Épinal	2–2 (a.e.t.) (6–5 p)	Laval
Stade Poitevin	2–1	Nice

== Second round ==
The matches were played on 4, 5, 6 and 13 January 1998.

Team 1	Score	Team 2
Paris Saint-Germain	1–0	Lyon
Auxerre	3–0	Guingamp
Gueugnon	1–2	Metz
Stade Poitevin	2–1	Nîmes
Cannes	3–2	Strasbourg
Martigues	1–0	Beauvais
Nancy	2–2 (a.e.t.) (3–2 p)	Bastia
Le Havre	5–3 (a.e.t.)	Lorient
Lens	1–0	Rennes
Monaco	1–1 (a.e.t.) (1–3 p)	Niort
Saint-Étienne	1–1 (a.e.t.) (2–4 p)	Sochaux
Le Mans	1–0	Lille
Mulhouse	0–3	Bordeaux
Montpellier	1–0	Nantes
Marseille	1–0	Châteauroux
Épinal	0–2	Toulouse

== Round of 16 ==
The matches were played on 30, 31 January and 1 February 1998.

Team 1	Score	Team 2
Bordeaux	5–1	Le Mans
Auxerre	3–1 (a.e.t.)	Toulouse
Lens	1–0 (a.e.t.)	Niort
Marseille	3–0	Nancy
Martigues	0–2	Metz
Sochaux	1–0	Cannes
Stade Poitevin	2–1	Le Havre
Paris Saint-Germain	2–0	Montpellier

== Quarter-finals ==
The matches were played on 16, 17 and 18 February 1998.

Team 1	Score	Team 2
Paris Saint-Germain	1–0	Metz
Marseille	2–3	Auxerre
Sochaux	1–4	Lens
Bordeaux	4–3 (a.e.t.)	Stade Poitevin

== Semi-finals ==
The matches were played on 10 and 12 March 1998.

Team 1	Score	Team 2
Bordeaux	1–1 (a.e.t.) (4–2 p)	Auxerre
Paris Saint-Germain	2–1	Lens

== Final ==
The final was played on 4 April 1998 at the Stade de France.

4 April 1998
20:45

Paris Saint-Germain	2–2 (a.e.t.)	Bordeaux
Simone 80'; Raí 107'		Micoud 30'; Papin 114'
Penalties
Rabesandratana (penalty scored); Simone (penalty scored); Raí (penalty scored); Loko (penalty scored)	4–2	(penalty missed) Gralak; (penalty missed) Papin; (penalty scored) Luccin; (penalty scored) Micoud

Stade de France, Saint-Denis
Attendance: 77,700
Referee: Rémi Harrel
