= Stéphane Collet =

Malagasy footballer (born 1972)

Personal information
- Date of birth: 13 June 1972
- Place of birth: Antsiranana, Madagascar
- Height: 1.68 m (5 ft 6 in)
- Position: Midfielder

Senior career*
Years	Team	Apps	(Gls)
1991–1996	Nice	107	(5)
1996–1999	Strasbourg	95	(3)
1999–2000	Lens	4	(0)
2000–2004	Real Sociedad	6	(0)
2001–2002	→ Strasbourg (loan)	14	(0)
2002–2004	Real Sociedad B	0	(0)
2004–2005	ROS Menton		

International career
2003	Madagascar	3	(0)
- * Club domestic league appearances and goals

Stéphane Collet (born 13 June 1972) is a Malagasy former professional footballer who played as a midfielder.

== Personal life ==
Collet was born in Antsiranana, Madagascar. He holds Malagasy and French nationalities.

== Career ==
Collet debuted professionally for OGC Nice, and spent his career in Ligue 1 and La Liga. He has represented the Madagascar national team. While at Strasbourg he won the Coupe de la Ligue in 1997, playing in the final.
