= Camerina Pavón y Oviedo =

Mexican poet

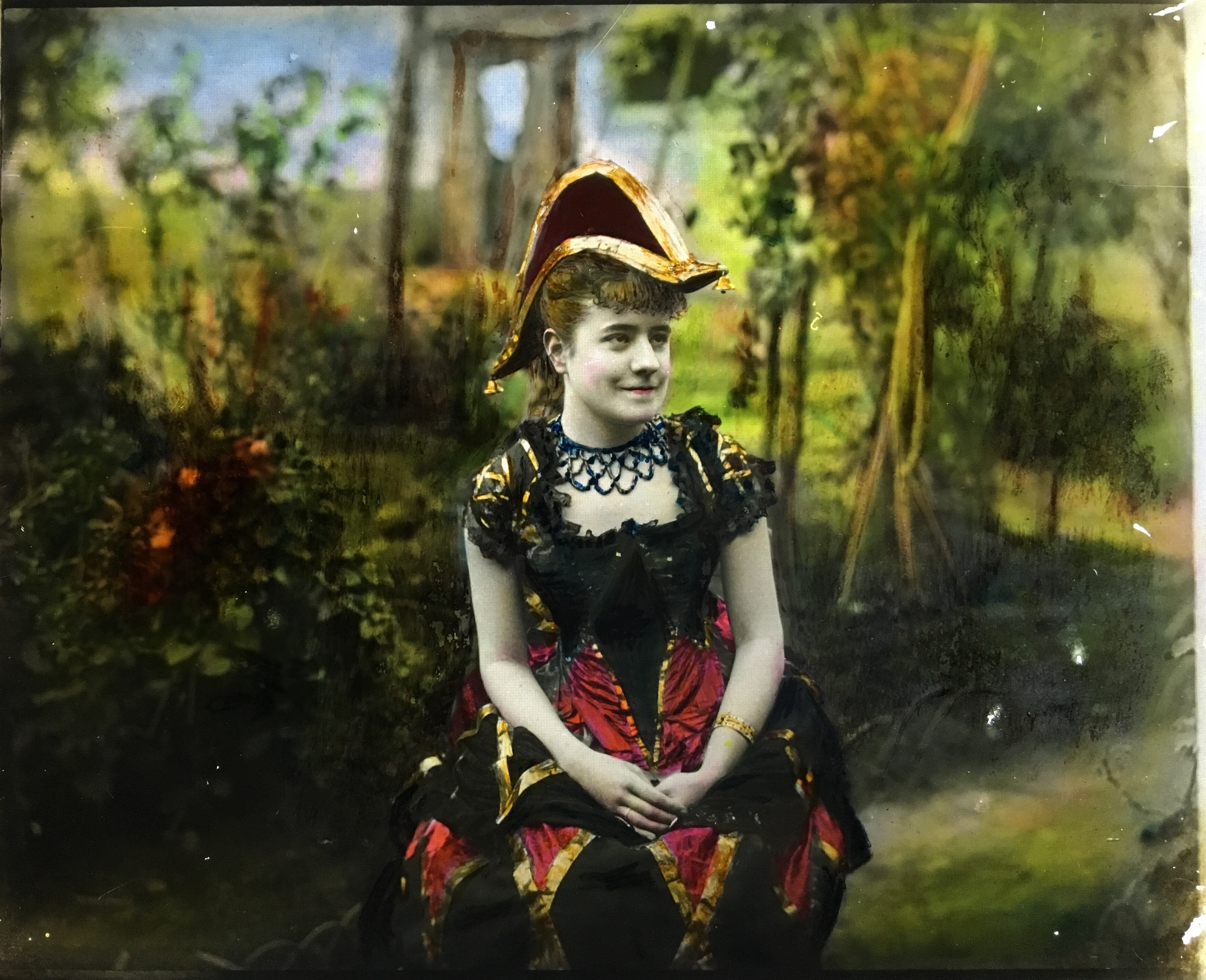
- Artistically colorized photograph featuring the poet herself
- Born: Camerina Luisa Pavón y Oviedo; 28 July 1862; Mexico City, Mexico
- Died: 18 July 1893 (aged 30); Mexico City, Mexico
- Occupation: Poet
- Relatives: José Ignacio Pavón (paternal grandfather)
- Writing career
- Period: Late 19th century

Camerina Pavón y Oviedo (born Camerina Luisa Pavón y Oviedo; 21 July 1862 – 18 July 1893) was a Mexican poet.

== Life ==
Camerina Pavón was baptized at the Mexico City Metropolitan Cathedral and was the fourth daughter of the criminal lawyer and public defender, José María Pavón González del Castillo (1827-1900), born in Mexico City and his wife, Manuela Oviedo Ortiz de Pavón (1835-1893), originally from Álamos, Sonora, who were progressive, political supporters, in times of the Empire and the Itinerant Republic of Benito Juárez, of the Restored Republic and the Porfiriato. They educated their daughters in the humanities, so that they would not only sew, embroider and play the piano, as was the case at that time for Mexican women of high social classes.

Member of an ideologically divided family, granddaughter of José Ignacio Pavón, the President of the Supreme Court of Justice (1858), Acting President of the country (1860) and supporter of bringing Maximilian to Mexico as king, her father was liberal and Catholic, like herself, and close to the presidents Benito Juárez and Porfirio Díaz. She was born into a wealthy family, which later had shortcomings, partly due to the struggles between the Conservative Party and the Liberal Party. To cope better with things, the family moved to Doctora 118 Street in Tacubaya, then a suburb of Mexico City.

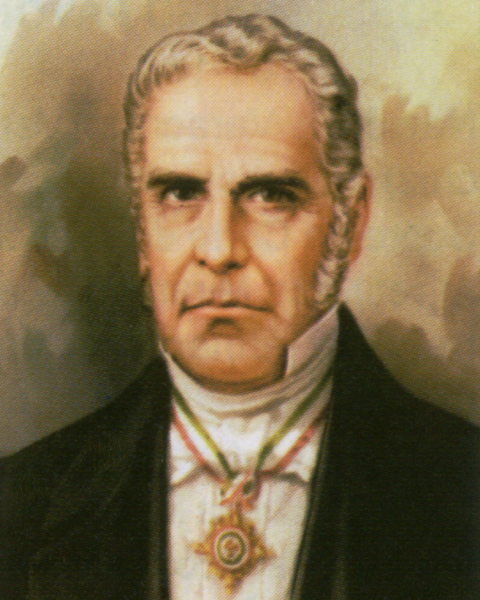
José Ignacio Pavón, grandfather of Camerina Pavón y Oviedo.

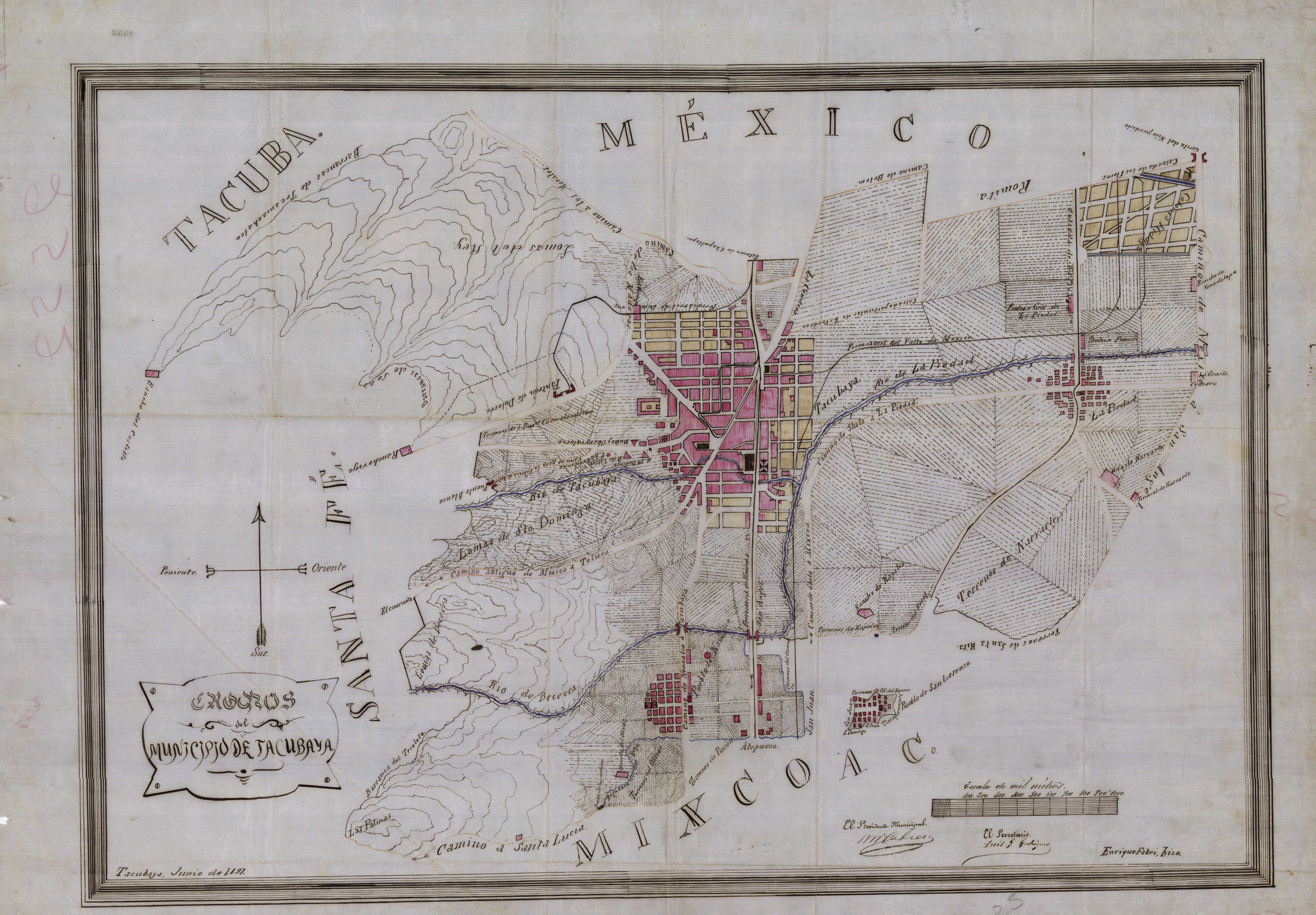
Map of the Tacubaya municipality at the end of the 19th century.

== Work ==
She published her poetry in the liberal newspaper El Monitor Republicano, founded and directed by the Mexican journalist Vicente García Torres, and in the Diario del Hogar of Filomeno Mata, who described her as a "distinguished collaborator." Among her production, is the verse she wrote to Matilde Montoya, the first woman who studied and practiced medicine professionally in Mexico:

I want, Matilde, in the name of my sex,
to dedicate my song to you, so moved
because you have opened a bright future
to women in the venturous life...

She participated in the gatherings of intellectuals and writers and was part of the circle of Mexican poets who prepared to send her work to the Chicago World's Fair. Vicente Riva Palacio included her in his work El parnaso mexicano ("The Mexican Parnassus").

== Death ==
Pavón y Oviedo died at the age of 30 stricken by scarlet fever. Journalist Arturo Paz summoned the circle of poets they belonged to contribute a verse about her. The result was part of the Corona fúnebre dedicada a la Sra. Manuela Oviedo de Pavón y su hija Camerina ("Funeral crown dedicated to Mrs. Manuela Oviedo de Pavón and her daughter Camerina") published by her father José María Pavón with the verses and texts of poets and intellectuals of his time. Also, an unpublished verse called Último canto ("Last Song") and dedicated to her "idolized mother" that the poet wrote a few days earlier when her mother died was included in the publication:

Si hay un dolor que llegue al infinito,
Es de una madre la eternal ausencia,
Que afecto como el suyo, tan bendito,
No se vuelve a encontrar en la existencia.

Esa dicha que brindan sus amores,
Esa sombra que imparte su cuidado
Para evitar mayores sinsabores
Al hijo a quien su vida ha consagrado.

Nadie la vuelve a dar, nada semeja
Esa ternura, su cariño santo,
Por eso es, la ventura que se aleja
