= Fabrice Kelban =

French footballer (born 1978)

Personal information
- Date of birth: 9 October 1978 (age 48)
- Place of birth: Villeneuve-Saint-Georges, France
- Position: Defender

Youth career
- 1992–1997: Paris Saint-Germain

Senior career*
Years	Team	Apps	(Gls)
1997–2001	Paris Saint-Germain	2	(0)
1999–2000	→ Créteil (loan)	18	(0)
2001–2003	Charleroi	2	(0)

International career
1997	France U18		
1998	France U21	3	(0)
- * Club domestic league appearances and goals

Fabrice Kelban (born 9 October 1978) is a French former professional footballer who played two matches for Paris Saint-Germain in Ligue 1 in the 1997–98 season and 18 matches for Créteil in Ligue 2 in the 1999–2000 season.

== Career ==
Kelbran won the 1997 UEFA European Under-18 Championship with France.
