= Pépito Pavon =

Spanish footballer (1941–2012)

Personal information
- Date of birth: 12 February 1941
- Place of birth: Madrid, Spain
- Date of death: 17 October 2012 (aged 71)
- Place of death: La Ciotat, France
- Position: Midfielder

Youth career
- Étoile sportive La Ciotat

Senior career*
Years	Team	Apps	(Gls)
1960–1964	Marseille	49	(2)
1964–1974	Étoile sportive La Ciotat		
- * Club domestic league appearances and goals

Ignacio "Pépito" Pavon (12 February 1941 – 17 October 2012) was a Spanish footballer who played as a midfielder. He was the father of Michel Pavon.
