= Michel Pavon =

French footballer and coach (born 1968)

Personal information
- Date of birth: 7 November 1968 (age 57)
- Place of birth: La Ciotat, France
- Height: 1.80 m (5 ft 11 in)
- Position: Midfielder

Youth career
- 1983–1986: Toulouse

Senior career*
Years	Team	Apps	(Gls)
1986–1994	Toulouse	197	(29)
1994–1996	Montpellier	53	(9)
1996–2000	Bordeaux	128	(4)
2000–2001	Betis	10	(0)
Total		388	(42)

Managerial career
- 2003–2005: Bordeaux
- 2010–2011: Bordeaux (assistant)
- 2013–2014: Blanquefort
- 2014–2016: Libourne
- * Club domestic league appearances and goals

Michel Pavon (born 7 November 1968) is a French former professional footballer, and is a coach.

During his playing career, the defensive midfielder appeared for three teams in 14 years while appearing in 378 Ligue 1 matches as a professional (a very brief spell in Spain notwithstanding), and worked mainly with Bordeaux as both a player and coach.

== Playing career ==
Pavon was born in La Ciotat, Bouches-du-Rhône (in the Marseille region) to a Spanish father, Pépito Pavon, who was also a footballer, and a French mother, and started his professional football career with Toulouse FC, playing his first Ligue 1 match on 7 November 1986 against Paris Saint-Germain FC (3–2 away win on the day of his 18th birthday). During his long period at Toulouse he was selected for the France under-21 team, and had a successful last season scoring seven goals.

In 1994, Pavon moved to Montpellier HSC on a two-year contract. When it expired he signed with FC Girondins de Bordeaux, where he garnered a firm fan base due to his enthusiastic play and hard work. He became captain of the side within a short period, helping them reach the 1997 and 1998 League Cup finals and also winning the top division title in 1999.

In his last years with Bordeaux, it was rumoured that Pavon would move to Olympique de Marseille – although raised in that area, he gave his heart to Bordeaux and ignored the rumours, playing his last match on 26 August 2000 against RC Lens. After four successful seasons he finally left the Girondins to play in his father's native country, signing a three-year contract with Real Betis in Segunda División; after only ten matches to help the Andalusians win promotion to La Liga, he decided to retire at the age of 32 after suffering a serious injury.

== Coaching career ==
On 24 October 2003, Pavon became head coach at Bordeaux after replacing the dismissed Élie Baup, earning a two-year extension at the season's end. In 2004–05, he suffered from a heart problem which caused him to miss the last three games of the campaign, and president Jean-Louis Triaud announced in June 2005 that the manager was standing down; he continued his work at the club in a scouting function, as Ricardo Gomes took charge.

In late May 2010, Pavon returned again to Bordeaux, being named newly appointed coach Jean Tigana's assistant. In February of the following year, he left his post.

Pavon worked in lower league and amateur football in the following years, being in charge of ES Blanquefort and FC Libourne.

== Personal life ==
Pavon is the father of professional golfer Matthieu Pavon.
