= Franck Gava =

French footballer (born 1970)

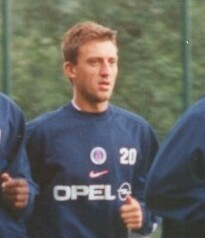
- Gava, 1997 or 1998

Personal information
- Full name: Franck Roger Antoine Gava
- Date of birth: 3 February 1970 (age 56)
- Place of birth: Montargis, Loiret, France
- Height: 1.80 m (5 ft 11 in)
- Position: Midfielder

Youth career
- Nancy

Senior career*
Years	Team	Apps	(Gls)
1987–1992	Nancy	165	(19)
1992–1997	Lyon	155	(29)
1997–1998	Paris Saint-Germain	31	(2)
1998–1999	Monaco	27	(2)
1999–2000	Rennes	18	(1)

International career
1996–1997	France	3	(0)
- * Club domestic league appearances and goals

Franck Roger Antoine Gava (born 3 February 1970) is a French former professional footballer who played as a midfielder.

== Early life and club career ==
Gava was born in Montargis, Loiret. He emerged through AS Nancy-Lorraine's youth system, making his professional debuts at age 17. However, he would grow to prominence in the first division at Olympique Lyonnais, being a very valuable offensive unit alongside Florian Maurice.

In 1997, Gava signed - alongside close friend Maurice - with capital side Paris Saint-Germain, scoring seven goals in his first season and helping the club capture both the Cup and League cup that year.

After that, he played with AS Monaco FC and Stade Rennais one season apiece, being forced to retire at 30 due to foot ailments; he did amass more than 400 official matches counting both major divisions in France.

== International career ==
Gava collected three caps for France in a one-year span, all in friendlies and as a substitute; the first arrived on 9 October 1996, against Turkey.
