= José Ignacio Pavón =

President of Mexico in 1860

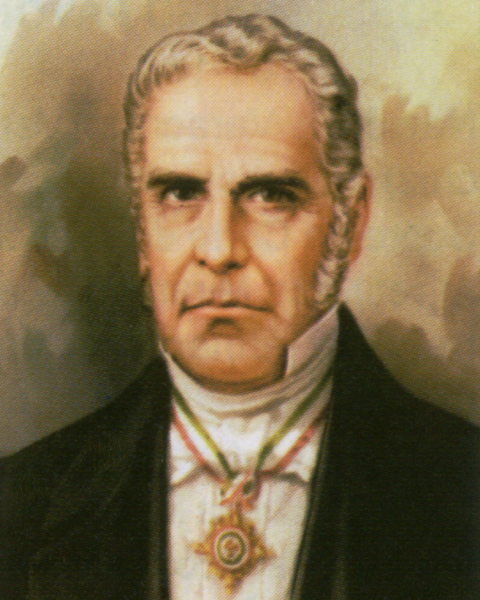
- Photograph of Pavón

30th President of Mexico by the Plan of Tacubaya
- In office 13 August 1860 – 15 August 1860
- Preceded by: Miguel Miramón
- Succeeded by: Miguel Miramón

Personal details
- Born: 11 August 1791 Veracruz, Veracruz
- Died: 25 May 1866 (Age 74) Mexico City, Mexico
- Party: Conservative
- Awards: Order of Guadalupe

José Ignacio María del Corazón de Jesús de Santa Clara Francisco Javier Juan Nepomuceno Antonio de Padua Pavón Jiménez (11 August 1791 – 25 May 1866), known as José Ignacio Pavón, was a Mexican civil servant, and briefly, for two days, interim President of Mexico during the final months of a civil war, the War of Reform, being waged between conservatives and liberals, in which he served as president for the Conservatives, in opposition to President Benito Juárez, head of the Liberals.

== Biography ==
Pavón was born in Veracruz, where he began his studies. He continued his education in the Colegio de San Ildefonso in Mexico City, where he studied philosophy and law (cánones y leyes).

He was an honorary city councilman of Mexico City in 1818 and secretary of the censorship committee in 1820. After Mexico gained its independence in 1821, and political parties emerged supporting either a republic or a monarchy, Ignacio tended to keep his distance from both factions, though he leaned towards the republicans.

As the First Mexican Empire fell in 1822, he rejoiced in the fall of the monarchy and took an active role in politics, hoping that the installation of a new congress could proceed quickly. The governing junta that now gained power gave him the task of writing the criminal code. He was a member of the economic society Amigos del País (friends of the nation) and was in charge of the treasury for the Academy of Jurisprudence, and an honorary member for a child welfare organization. He was also an associate of the Mexican Atheneum. From 1822 to 1823 he was juez de hecho (legal expert) on the law of the press for the municipal government of Mexico City.

In April 1823 the Supreme Executive Power assigned him a senior post within the Department of the Treasury, and also made him interim governor of the State of Tabasco. In 1825, he was placed in charge of the Department of Foreign Relations, and negotiated British recognition of Mexican independence.

He fought in the Mexican Federalist War and was defeated by Antonio Rosillo in the Battle of Alcantra on 3 October 1839.

He was named to the Mexican Supreme Court in 1841.

His appointment to the presidency during the War of Reform, in August of 1860, was a simple bureaucratic formality. As the tide of the war turned against the conservatives, Miguel Miramón asked the conservative government for a vote of confidence. He resigned, and in the meantime, Ignacio Pavón, as president of the supreme court, was assigned the position of interim president. The government voted to support Miramón, and Ignacio Pavón's only presidential act was publishing the results of that election.

== See also ==
- List of heads of state of Mexico

== Footnotes ==
Preceded by Miguel Miramón	Provisional President of Mexico; 13–15 August 1860	Succeeded by Miguel Miramón
