= Enrique Pavón Pereyra =

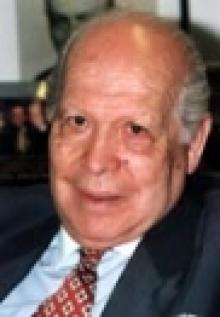
- Born: 2 April 1921; Santiago del Estero, Argentina
- Died: January 9, 2004 (aged 82); Buenos Aires, Argentina
- Occupation: Historian, Perón's biographer
- Literary movement: Peronism
- Children: Valeria Pavón Pereyra; Enrique Manuel Pavón Pereyra

Enrique Pavón Pereyra (1921-2004) was a historian and Peronist politician known for biographical works on Juan Perón to whom he was very close. He was secretary of Juan Perón during his exile in Francoist Spain and served later as director of the National Library of the Argentine Republic. He was also one of the founders of the Juan Domingo Perón Museum.
