= Peter Luccin =

French footballer (born 1979)

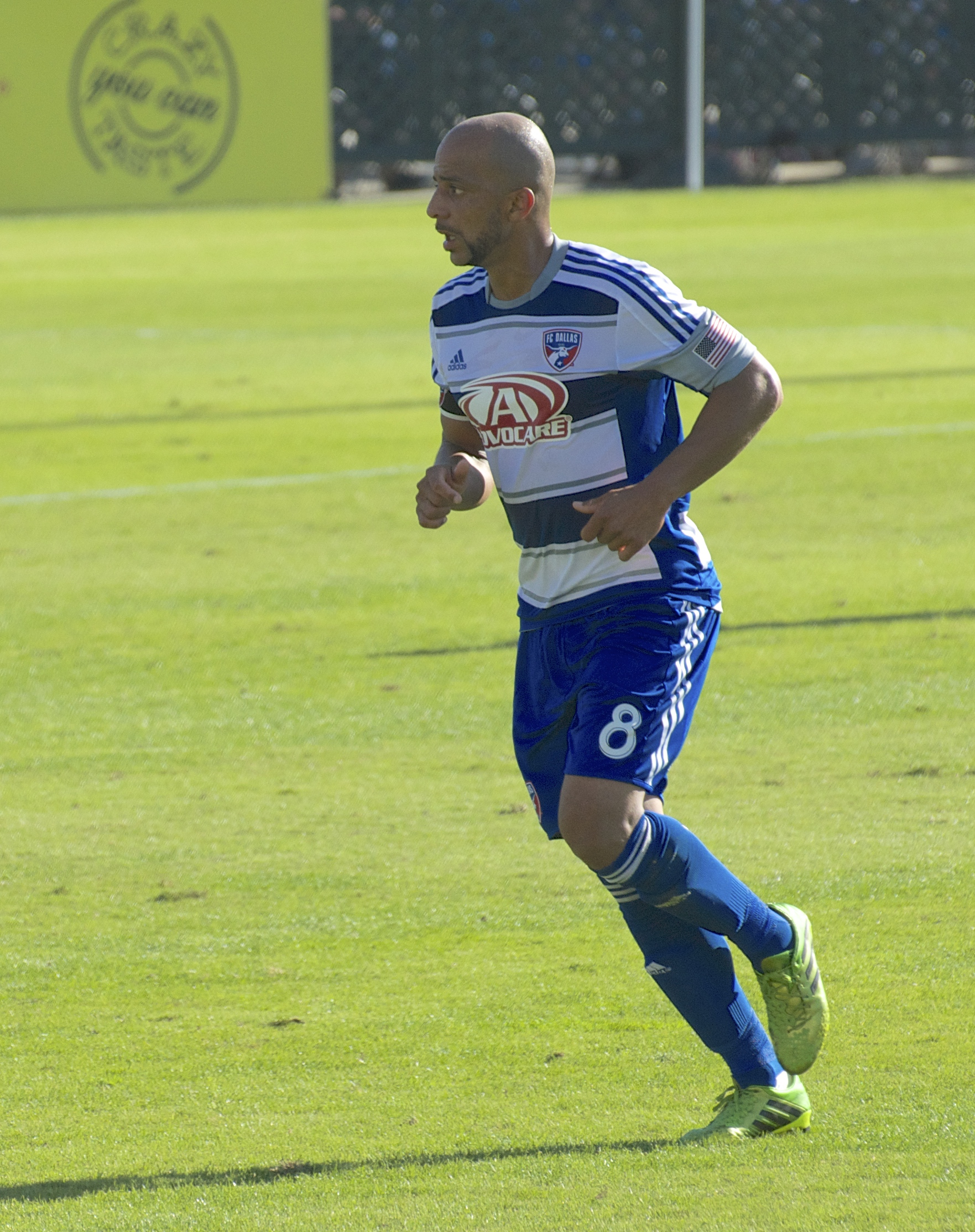
- Luccin playing for Dallas

Personal information
- Full name: Peter Bernard Luccin
- Date of birth: 9 April 1979 (age 47)
- Place of birth: Marseille, Bouches-du-Rhône, France
- Height: 1.81 m (5 ft 11 in)
- Position: Defensive midfielder

Team information
- Current team: Atlético Dallas (manager)

Youth career
- 1987–1989: Saint-Joseph
- 1989–1992: Vivaux-Maronniers
- 1992–1994: SO Caillols
- 1994–1996: Cannes

Senior career*
Years	Team	Apps	(Gls)
1996–1997	Cannes	13	(0)
1997–1998	Bordeaux	41	(0)
1998–2000	Marseille	51	(2)
2000–2002	Paris Saint-Germain	26	(1)
2001–2002	→ Celta (loan)	33	(1)
2002–2004	Celta	64	(6)
2004–2007	Atlético Madrid	89	(2)
2007–2010	Zaragoza	31	(0)
2008–2009	→ Racing Santander (loan)	23	(2)
2011–2012	Lausanne-Sport	7	(1)
2013–2014	FC Dallas	14	(0)
Total		391	(15)

International career
1997	France U20	5	(2)

Managerial career
- 2024: FC Dallas (interim)
- 2026–: Atlético Dallas
- * Club domestic league appearances and goals

Peter Bernard Luccin (French pronunciation: [lyksɛ̃]; born 9 April 1979) is a French professional football manager and former player who played as a defensive midfielder. He is the manager of USL Championship club Atlético Dallas.

After arriving in Spain at age 22, he went on to appear in more than 300 official matches for a handful of clubs in the country. In La Liga, he amassed totals of 239 games and 11 goals over the course of eight seasons, spending three years apiece with Celta and Atlético Madrid.

== Club career ==
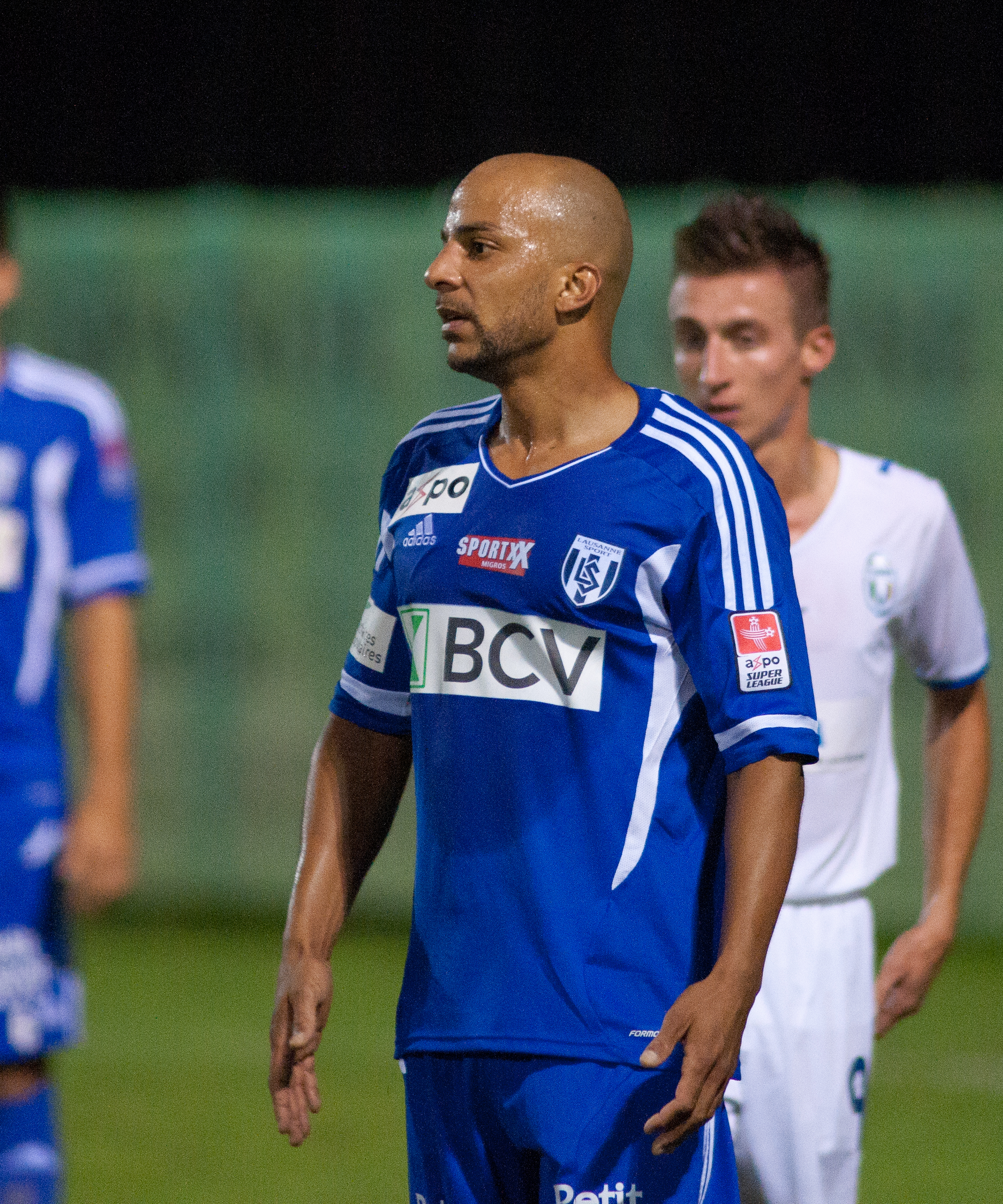
Luccin playing for Lausanne

Luccin was born in Marseille, Bouches-du-Rhône. After emerging through Cannes' youth system he appeared in his country for Bordeaux, Marseille and Paris Saint-Germain (where he collected 13 yellow cards during the 2000–01 season).

Luccin's first adventure abroad came in summer 2001 when he arrived on loan to Celta, which later became permanent. In July 2004 he transferred to fellow La Liga club Atlético Madrid from relegated Celta (even though he scored a career-best five goals that season, also being sent off twice). He helped the Colchoneros qualify to the UEFA Cup in the 2006–07 campaign and, during his three-year spell, appeared in an average of 30 games per season, receiving 39 yellow cards and five red in the process.

Luccin was signed by Real Zaragoza at the last minute of the transfer window in August 2007, rejoining his former Celta coach Víctor Fernández. During that season the team dropped down a level and he picked 14 yellow cards, receiving his marching orders in a 3–3 home draw with Espanyol.

Again, on the last day of the summer transfer window, Racing Santander completed the signing of Luccin from relegated Zaragoza – he signed a one-year loan at El Sardinero, seen as a direct replacement for Aldo Duscher who joined Sevilla at the same time. Returning to the Aragonese after an irregular 2008–09 he missed the entire campaign due to injury, and left the team after 2009–10.

In July 2010, Luccin had a trial with Scottish Premier League side Celtic, but nothing came of it. In October 2011, after nearly two years away from competitive football, he signed for Lausanne-Sport in the Swiss Super League.

In April 2012, Luccin left Lausanne after reportedly falling out with the club. He signed with Major League Soccer's FC Dallas on 10 December, leaving two years later after the team declined the option to retain him.

== International career ==
Luccin played for France in the 1997 FIFA World Youth Championship, as the youngest member for the eventual quarter-finalists.

== Coaching career ==
Luccin's first coaching positions for FC Dallas were with the youth and academy levels, working with the U12, U13, and U14 boys teams from 2014 to 2019. He was then promoted to first team assistant coach in 2019 before being named the interim head coach on 9 June 2024. After the 2024 season ended, he was not retained as the permanent head coach and left the club.

On 10 February 2026, Luccin was announced as the first team manager for Atlético Dallas ahead of their inaugural USL Championship season beginning in 2027.

== Career statistics ==
Appearances and goals by club, season and competition
Club	Season	League			Cup (Note: Includes Coupe de la Ligue, Coupe de France, Copa del Rey and U.S. Open Cup.)		Continental (Note: Includes UEFA Champions League, UEFA Cup and UEFA Intertoto Cup.)		Total	
Club	Season	Division	Apps	Goals	Apps	Goals	Apps	Goals	Apps	Goals
Cannes	1996–97	Division 1	13	0	–		–		13	0
Bordeaux	1996–97	Division 1	11	0	5	0	–		16	0
Bordeaux	1997–98	Division 1	30	0	5	0	2	0	37	0
Bordeaux	Total		41	0	10	0	2	0	53	0
Marseille	1998–99	Division 1	23	1	2	0	10	0	35	1
Marseille	1999–00	Division 1	28	1	3	0	12	0	43	1
Marseille	Total		51	2	5	0	22	0	78	2
Paris Saint-Germain	2000–01	Ligue 1	25	1	1	0	11	1	37	2
Celta (loan)	2001–02	Primera División	33	1	2	0	2	0	37	1
Celta	2002–03	Primera División	35	1	–		5	0	40	1
Celta	2003–04	Primera División	29	5	6	0	6	1	41	6
Celta	Total		64	6	6	0	11	1	81	7
Atlético Madrid	2004–05	Primera División	29	0	3	0	–		32	0
Atlético Madrid	2005–06	Primera División	29	2	3	0	–		32	2
Atlético Madrid	2006–07	Primera División	31	0	4	0	2	0	37	0
Atlético Madrid	Total		89	2	11	0	2	0	102	2
Zaragoza	2007–08	Primera División	31	0	2	0	2	0	35	0
Racing Santander (loan)	2008–09	Primera División	23	2	3	0	5	0	31	2
Lausanne	2010–11	Super League	7	1	–		–		7	1
FC Dallas	2013	MLS	3	0	–		–		3	0
FC Dallas	2014	MLS	11	0	1	0	–		12	0
FC Dallas	Total		14	0	1	0	0	0	15	0
Career total			391	15	41	0	57	2	489	17
