= Gralak =

Brazilian footballer (born 1969)

Personal information
- Full name: Paulo Sérgio Gralak
- Date of birth: 18 September 1969 (age 57)
- Place of birth: Reboucas, Paraná, Brazil
- Position: Defender

Senior career*
Years	Team	Apps	(Gls)
1988–1989	Pinheiros		
1989–1993	Paraná Clube		
1993–1994	Corinthians		
1994–1995	Coritiba		
1996–1998	Bordeaux	51	(1)
1998–2001	İstanbulspor		
- * Club domestic league appearances and goals

Paulo Sérgio Gralak (born 18 September 1969), known as just Gralak, is a Brazilian former professional footballer who played as a defender.
