= Coupe de la Ligue =

French football tournament

- Founded: 1994; 32 years ago
- Abolished: 2020; 6 years ago
- Region: France
- Teams: 42
- Qualifier for: UEFA Europa League
- Last champions: Paris Saint-Germain (9th title)
- Most championships: Paris Saint-Germain (9 titles)

The Coupe de la Ligue (French pronunciation: [kup də la liɡ]), known outside France as the French League Cup, was a knockout cup competition in French football organized by the Ligue de Football Professionnel. The tournament was established in 1993 and, unlike the Coupe de France, was only open to professional clubs in France which play in country's top three football divisions, though the third is not fully professional.

The most successful team in the competition was Paris Saint-Germain with nine wins, including the last edition in 2019–20. The LFP voted to suspend the competition indefinitely to "reduce the season schedule".

== Precursors ==
Another competition named Coupe de la Ligue existed from 1963 to 1965. In 1982, a Coupe d'Eté (Summer cup) was held before the start of the French league season; the cup was won by Laval. This tournament continued under the name of Coupe de la Ligue, until 1994, before the beginning of the French season. (The 1991 edition was open only for Division 2 Teams).

== History ==
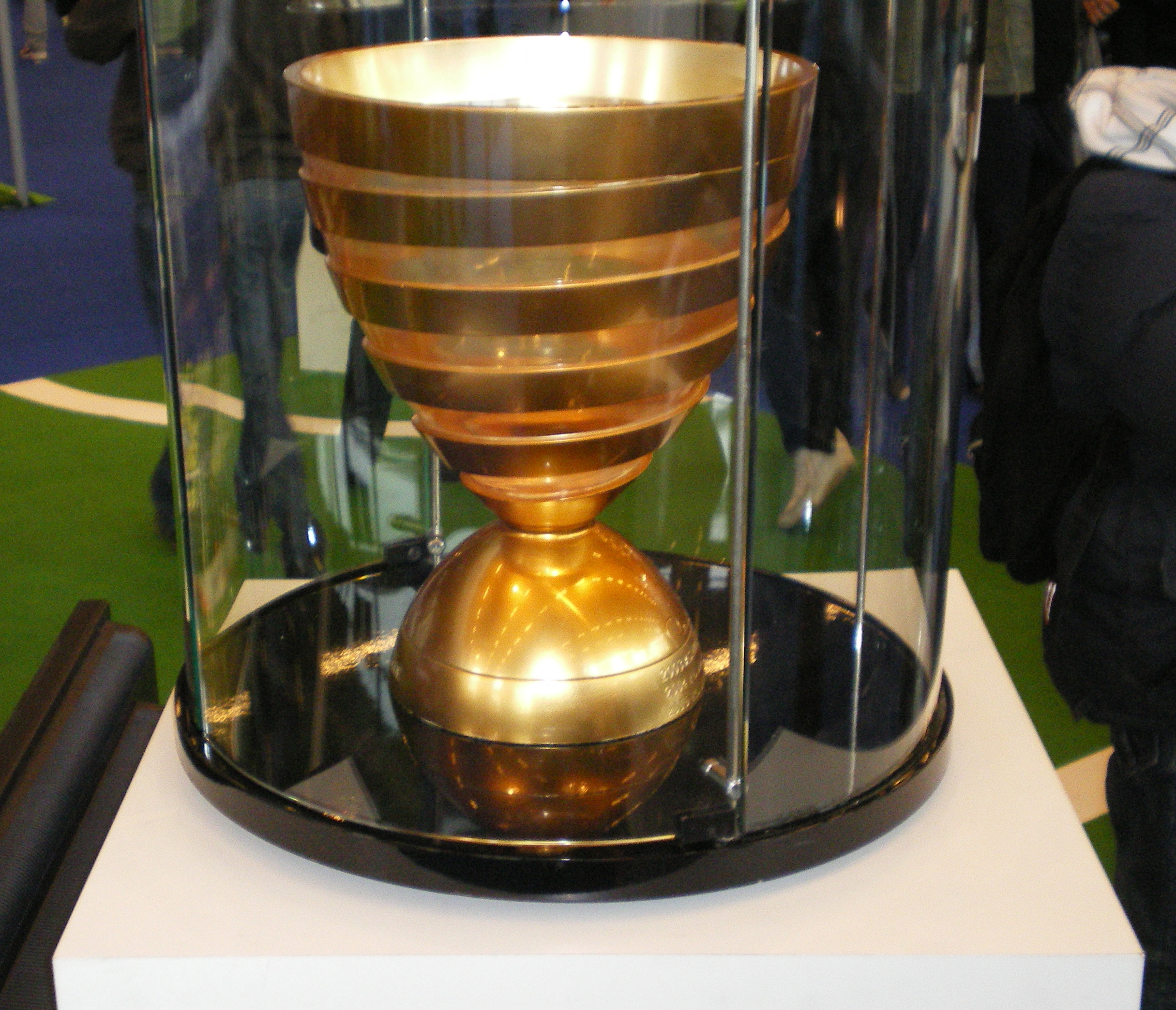
The second and last version of the Coupe de la Ligue trophy

The tournament in its last format started in 1994 and was initiated by the professional teams because of their displeasure with the Coupe de France, thanks to its built-in home advantage for teams playing in the lower leagues. Entrance to the UEFA Cup, now called the UEFA Europa League, was offered to the winning team. Its first winner was Paris Saint-Germain, after their 2–0 victory over Bastia. The first final decided by a penalty shootout was in 1996 when Metz beat Lyon. The first three finals were held at Parc des Princes; from the 1998 edition until 2015, the finals have been held at the Stade de France. Strasbourg and Paris Saint-Germain won the competition at both stadiums. Gueugnon became the first team below the top division of France to win the cup after beating Paris Saint-Germain in the 2000 final. Overall, there were 14 winners of the competition since its inception.

For over 20 years from its inception, finals of the tournament were only held in the Paris area: the first three were at the Parc des Princes and the rest at the Stade de France. This changed in September 2016 when the LFP announced that the next three finals would be held in Lyon, Bordeaux and Lille respectively. The LFP suspended the competition indefinitely after the 2019–20 season, to reduce fixture congestion. In the last final in 2020, Paris Saint-Germain and Lyon drew 0–0 and the former won 6–5 on penalties.

== Winners ==
Team	Winners	Runners-up	Years won	Years runner-up
Paris Saint-Germain	9	1	1995, 1998, 2008, 2014, 2015, 2016, 2017, 2018, 2020	2000
Strasbourg	4	0	1964, 1997, 2005, 2019	—
Bordeaux	3	3	2002, 2007, 2009	1997, 1998, 2010
Marseille	3	0	2010, 2011, 2012	—
Metz	2	1	1986, 1996	1999
Lens	2	1	1994, 1999	2008
Laval	2	0	1982, 1984	—
Lyon	1	5	2001	1996, 2007, 2012, 2014, 2020
Monaco	1	4	2003	1984, 2001, 2017, 2018
Montpellier	1	2	1992	1994, 2011
Nantes	1	1	1965	2004
Sochaux	1	1	2004	2003
Nancy	1	1	2006	1982
Reims	1	0	1991	—
Gueugnon	1	0	2000	—
Saint-Étienne	1	0	2013	—

== Records ==
- Most tournament wins (team): 9, Paris Saint-Germain
- Most final appearances (team): 10, Paris Saint-Germain
- Most tournament wins (player): 6, Edinson Cavani, Marquinhos, Thiago Silva and Marco Verratti (2014, 2015, 2016, 2017, 2018 and 2020)
- Most tournament wins (manager): 4, Didier Deschamps (2003, 2010, 2011 and 2012) and Laurent Blanc (2009, 2014, 2015 and 2016)
- All-time top goalscorer (player): Edinson Cavani and Pauleta, 15 goals each
- Most goals scored in a season (player): 7, Stéphane Guivarc'h (1997–98)
- Most goals scored in the final (player): 8, Edinson Cavani (2 in 2014, 2 in 2015, 2 in 2017, 2 in 2018)
