= 1999–2000 Paris Saint-Germain FC season =

Paris Saint-Germain
1999–2000 season
- President: Laurent Perpère
- Head coach: Philippe Bergeroo
- Stadium: Parc des Princes
- Division 1: 2nd
- Coupe de France: Round of 16
- Coupe de la Ligue: Runners-up
- Top goalscorer: League: Christian (16); All: Christian (19)
- Highest home attendance: 44,784 (vs Marseille, 12 October 1999)
- Lowest home attendance: 29,627 (vs Nancy, 20 February 2000)
- Average home league attendance: 43,185
Home colours	Away colours	Third colours

The 1999–2000 season was Paris Saint-Germain's 30th season in existence. PSG played their home league games at the Parc des Princes in Paris, registering an average attendance of 43,185 spectators per match. The club was presided by Laurent Perpère and the team was coached by Philippe Bergeroo. Ali Benarbia was the team captain.

== Players ==
As of the 1999–2000 season.

=== Squad ===
Note: Flags indicate national team as defined under FIFA eligibility rules; some limited exceptions apply. Players may hold more than one non-FIFA nationality.

No.	Pos.	Nation	Player
1	GK	FRA	Bernard Lama
3	DF	FRA	Nicolas Laspalles
4	DF	MAR	Talal El Karkouri
5	DF	BRA	César Belli
6	DF	NGR	Godwin Okpara
7	FW	BRA	Christian
8	FW	GUI	Kaba Diawara
9	MF	ALG	Ali Benarbia (captain)
10	MF	NGR	Jay-Jay Okocha
11	FW	FRA	Laurent Robert
15	DF	MAD	Éric Rabésandratana
16	GK	FRA	Dominique Casagrande

No.	Pos.	Nation	Player
17	DF	FRA	Jimmy Algerino
18	MF	ALB	Edvin Murati
19	FW	FRA	Laurent Leroy
20	MF	FRA	Édouard Cissé
22	MF	RUS	Igor Yanovsky
23	MF	FRA	Pierre Ducrocq
24	FW	FRA	Mickaël Madar
25	DF	FRA	Grégory Paisley
26	DF	SEN	Aliou Cissé
28	MF	FRA	Fabrice Abriel
30	GK	FRA	Laurent Quievreux

== Pre-season and friendlies ==
Win Draw Loss

9 July 1999 Friendly	Le Mans (France)	1–1	(France) Paris Saint-Germain	Orléans
		Report		Stadium: Stade de La Source

14 July 1999 Friendly	Paris Saint-Germain (France)	3–1	(Switzerland) Servette	Vittel
		Report		Stadium: Stade Jean Bouloumié; Attendance: 3,000

21 July 1999 Friendly	Paris Saint-Germain (France)	2–0	(Slovakia) Teplice	Bondoufle
		Report		Stadium: Stade Robert Bobin; Attendance: 5,500

24 July 1999 Friendly	Toulouse (France)	1–2	(France) Paris Saint-Germain	La Sauvetat-du-Dropt
		Report		Stadium: Stade Intercommunal Pierre Perie; Attendance: 3,000

4 September 1999 Friendly	Paris Saint-Germain (France)	1–1	Cameroon	Paris
		Report		Stadium: Parc des Princes; Attendance: 17,805

30 December 1999 Friendly	Racing Club de France	1–0	(France) Paris Saint-Germain	Colombes
		Report		Stadium: Stade Yves-du-Manoir; Attendance: 2,000

17 March 2000 Friendly	Créteil (France)	0–1	(France) Paris Saint-Germain	Créteil
		Report		Stadium: Stade Dominique Duvauchelle

17 May 2000 Friendly	Martinique	2–3	(France) Paris Saint-Germain	Fort-de-France
		Report		Stadium: Stade Pierre-Aliker

20 May 2000 Friendly	Paris Saint-Germain (France)	1–0	(France) Lyon	Baie-Mahault
		Report		Stadium: Stade Municipal

== Competitions ==
Competition	First match	Last match	Starting round	Final position	Record							
Competition	First match	Last match	Starting round	Final position	Pld	W	D	L	GF	GA	GD	Win %
Division 1	28 July 1999	21 May 2000	Matchday 1	2nd	34	16	10	8	54	40	+14	47.06
Coupe de France	22 January 1999	5 March 2000	Round of 64	Round of 16	3	2	0	1	6	4	+2	66.67
Coupe de la Ligue	8 January 1999	22 April 2000	Round of 32	Runners-up	5	4	0	1	12	5	+7	80.00
Total					42	22	10	10	72	49	+23	52.38

Source: Competitions

=== Division 1 ===
==== League table ====
Pos	Team	Pld	W	D	L	GF	GA	GD	Pts	Qualification or relegation
1	Monaco (C)	34	20	5	9	69	38	+31	65	Qualification to Champions League first group stage
2	Paris Saint-Germain	34	16	10	8	54	40	+14	58	Qualification to Champions League first group stage
3	Lyon	34	16	8	10	45	42	+3	56	Qualification to Champions League third qualifying round
4	Bordeaux	34	15	9	10	52	40	+12	54	Qualification to UEFA Cup first round
5	Lens	34	14	7	13	42	41	+1	49	Qualification to Intertoto Cup third round

Source: Ligue 1
Rules for classification: 1) points; 2) goal difference; 3) number of goals scored.
(C) Champions

==== Results summary ====
Overall								Home						Away					
Pld	W	D	L	GF	GA	GD	Pts	W	D	L	GF	GA	GD	W	D	L	GF	GA	GD
34	16	10	8	54	40	+14	58	11	4	2	30	17	+13	5	6	6	24	23	+1

Source: Ligue 1

==== Results by round ====
Round	1	2	3	4	5	6	7	8	9	10	11	12	13	14	15	16	17	18	19	20	21	22	23	24	25	26	27	28	29	30	31	32	33	34
Ground	H	A	H	H	A	H	A	H	A	H	A	H	A	H	A	H	A	H	A	A	H	A	H	A	H	A	H	A	H	A	H	A	H	A
Result	W	W	W	D	L	W	D	L	W	L	D	W	L	W	L	W	W	W	W	L	D	D	W	L	D	L	D	D	W	D	W	W	W	D
Position	6	1	1	1	2	1	1	3	2	5	5	5	5	4	4	4	3	2	2	3	3	2	2	3	2	2	3	3	3	3	3	2	2	2

Source: Ligue 1
A = Away; H = Home; W = Win; D = Draw; L = Loss

==== Matches ====
31 July 1999 1	Paris Saint-Germain	1–0	Troyes	Paris
20:00 CEST (UTC+2)	Zavagno 61' (o.g.)			Stadium: Parc des Princes; Attendance: 43,542; Referee: Franck Glochon

7 August 1999 2	Rennes	1–3	Paris Saint-Germain	Rennes
20:00 CEST (UTC+2)	Diatta 31'		Robert 13', 90'; Madar 52' (pen.)	Stadium: Stade de la Route de Lorient; Attendance: 14,857; Referee: Gilles Chéron

14 August 1999 3	Paris Saint-Germain	2–1	Metz	Paris
20:00 CEST (UTC+2)	Algerino 5'; Okocha 30'		Meyrieu 10'	Stadium: Parc des Princes; Attendance: 41,549; Referee: Bruno Coué

20 August 1999 4	Paris Saint-Germain	1–1	Auxerre	Paris
20:00 CEST (UTC+2)	B. Rodriguez 85'		Guivarc'h 35'	Stadium: Parc des Princes; Attendance: 42,161; Referee: Stéphane Moulin

29 August 1999 5	Lyon	1–0	Paris Saint-Germain	Lyon
20:45 CEST (UTC+2)	Anderson 51' (pen.)			Stadium: Stade de Gerland; Attendance: 38,541; Referee: Damien Ledentu

12 September 1999 6	Paris Saint-Germain	2–1	Bordeaux	Paris
20:45 CEST (UTC+2)	Madar 22'; Okocha 79'		Wiltord 83' (pen.)	Stadium: Parc des Princes; Attendance: 43,735; Referee: Stéphane Bré

19 September 1999 7	Strasbourg	1–1	Paris Saint-Germain	Strasbourg
18:00 CEST (UTC+2)	Echouafni 69'		Madar 65' (pen.)	Stadium: Stade de la Meinau; Attendance: 30,798; Referee: Gilles Veissière

25 September 1999 8	Paris Saint-Germain	0–3	Monaco	Paris
20:00 CEST (UTC+2)			Trezeguet 65'; Léonard 82'; Giuly 90'	Stadium: Parc des Princes; Attendance: 43,899; Referee: Laurent Duhamel

3 October 1999 9	Nantes	0–4	Paris Saint-Germain	Nantes
20:45 CEST (UTC+2)			Algerino 7'; Madar 28'; Leroy 65', 85'	Stadium: Stade de la Beaujoire; Attendance: 27,323; Referee: Philippe Kalt

12 October 1999 10	Paris Saint-Germain	0–2	Marseille	Paris
20:45 CEST (UTC+2)			Ravanelli 73'; Maurice 82'	Stadium: Parc des Princes; Attendance: 44,784; Referee: Éric Poulat

16 October 1999 11	Nancy	1–1	Paris Saint-Germain	Tomblaine
20:00 CEST (UTC+2)	Wiart 39'		Madar 80'	Stadium: Stade Marcel Picot; Attendance: 11,084; Referee: Gilles Chéron

24 October 1999 12	Paris Saint-Germain	3–2	Sedan	Paris
18:00 CEST (UTC+2)	Madar 12'; Christian 34'; Robert 79'		N'Diefi 19'; Deblock 46'	Stadium: Parc des Princes; Attendance: 43,796; Referee: Bruno Ruffray

30 October 1999 13	Le Havre	3–1	Paris Saint-Germain	Le Havre
20:00 CET (UTC+1)	Lesage 34', 51'; Beuzelin 67'; Christian 85'			Stadium: Stade Jules Deschaseaux; Attendance: 13,329; Referee: Bruno Coué

6 November 1999 14	Paris Saint-Germain	2–0	Saint-Étienne	Paris
20:00 CET (UTC+1)	Madar 35'; Leroy 89'			Stadium: Parc des Princes; Attendance: 44,596; Referee: Claude Colombo

10 November 1999 15	Lens	3–2	Paris Saint-Germain	Lens
19:00 CET (UTC+1)	Job 52', 71'; Nouma 54'		Madar 21'; Christian 75' (pen.)	Stadium: Stade Félix Bollaert; Attendance: 38,731; Referee: Jean-Claude Puyalt

19 November 1999 16	Paris Saint-Germain	2–0	Bastia	Paris
20:00 CET (UTC+1)	Belli 52'; Leroy 54'			Stadium: Parc des Princes; Attendance: 41,613; Referee: Laurent Duhamel

27 November 1999 17	Montpellier	0–1	Paris Saint-Germain	Montpellier
20:00 CET (UTC+1)			Christian 59'	Stadium: Stade de la Mosson; Attendance: 15,859; Referee: Éric Poulat

5 December 1999 18	Paris Saint-Germain	1–0	Rennes	Paris
20:45 CET (UTC+1)	Cissé 2'			Stadium: Parc des Princes; Attendance: 43,991; Referee: Alain Sars

12 December 1999 19	Metz	1–3	Paris Saint-Germain	Metz
18:45 CET (UTC+1)	Jestrović 58'		Christian 17', 19', 79'	Stadium: Stade Saint-Symphorien; Attendance: 19,989; Referee: Bertrand Layec

17 December 1999 20	Auxerre	1–0	Paris Saint-Germain	Auxerre
20:45 CET (UTC+1)	Baticle 79'			Stadium: Stade de l'Abbé Deschamps; Attendance: 14,104; Referee: Gilles Veissière

11 January 2000 21	Paris Saint-Germain	2–2	Lyon	Paris
20:45 CET (UTC+1)	Christian 15'; Robert 60'		Anderson 81'; Vairelles 88'	Stadium: Parc des Princes; Attendance: 43,807; Referee: Laurent Duhamel

16 January 2000 22	Bordeaux	1–1	Paris Saint-Germain	Bordeaux
20:45 CET (UTC+1)	Laslandes 42'		Christian 12'	Stadium: Stade du Parc Lescure; Attendance: 32,083; Referee: Claude Colombo

26 January 2000 23	Paris Saint-Germain	4–2	Strasbourg	Paris
20:00 CET (UTC+1)	Christian 3', 10', 53', 80'		Ehret 84', 89'	Stadium: Parc des Princes; Attendance: 40,698; Referee: Dominique Fraise

1 February 2000 24	Monaco	1–0	Paris Saint-Germain	Monaco
20:45 CET (UTC+1)	Trezeguet 84'			Stadium: Stade Louis II; Attendance: 14,915; Referee: Damien Ledentu

5 February 2000 25	Paris Saint-Germain	0–0	Nantes	Paris
20:00 CET (UTC+1)				Stadium: Parc des Princes; Attendance: 43,659; Referee: Gilles Veissière

15 February 2000 26	Marseille	4–1	Paris Saint-Germain	Marseille
20:45 CET (UTC+1)	Pérez 24'; Pouget 59'; Abardonado 67'; Maurice 78'		Christian 7'	Stadium: Stade Vélodrome; Attendance: 54,876; Referee: Éric Poulat

26 February 2000 27	Paris Saint-Germain	1–1	Nancy	Paris
19:00 CET (UTC+1)	Rabésandratana 90+5'		Cascarino 85'	Stadium: Parc des Princes; Attendance: 42,103; Referee: Gilles Chéron

11 March 2000 28	Sedan	1–1	Paris Saint-Germain	Sedan
20:00 CET (UTC+1)	Mionnet 44'		Christian 59'	Stadium: Stade Émile Albeau; Attendance: 17,077; Referee: Stéphane Moulin

25 March 2000 29	Paris Saint-Germain	2–1	Le Havre	Paris
20:00 CET (UTC+1)	Yanovsky 36'; Leroy 56'		Mamouni 28'	Stadium: Parc des Princes; Attendance: 42,459; Referee: Philippe Kalt

8 April 2000 30	Saint-Étienne	1–1	Paris Saint-Germain	Saint-Étienne
20:00 CET (UTC+1)	Masudi 37'		Robert 27'	Stadium: Stade Geoffroy-Guichard; Attendance: 32,286; Referee: Franck Glochon

14 April 2000 31	Paris Saint-Germain	4–1	Lens	Paris
18:45 CET (UTC+1)	Leroy 33', 48', 84'; Robert 44'		B. Rodriguez 37'	Stadium: Parc des Princes; Attendance: 44,436; Referee: Bruno Ruffray

30 April 2000 32	Bastia	1–2	Paris Saint-Germain	Furiani
18:45 CET (UTC+1)	Petersen 90' (pen.)		Robert 70'; Yanovsky 75'	Stadium: Stade Armand-Cesari; Attendance: 10,800; Referee: Alain Sars

4 May 2000 33	Paris Saint-Germain	3–0	Montpellier	Paris
20:00 CET (UTC+1)	Robert 3'; M. Rodriguez 67' (o.g.); Ducrocq 90'			Stadium: Parc des Princes; Attendance: 36,683; Referee: Laurent Duhamel

13 May 2000 34	Troyes	2–2	Paris Saint-Germain	Troyes
20:00 CET (UTC+1)	Đukić 17' (pen.), 40'		Robert 21'; Christian 36'	Stadium: Stade de l'Aube; Attendance: 17,734; Referee: Philippe Kalt

=== Coupe de France ===
22 January 2000 Round of 64	Limoges FC	3–4	Paris Saint-Germain	Limoges
20:00 CET (UTC+1)	Soury 31'; Roussy 64'; Bouftata 70'		Diawara 20'; Christian 25', 75'; Leroy 83'	Stadium: Stade Saint-Lazare; Attendance: 9,700; Referee: Bruno Coué

12 February 2000 Round of 32	Baume-les-Dames	0–2	Paris Saint-Germain	Montbéliard
20:00 CET (UTC+1)			Algerino 13'; Rabésandratana 63'	Stadium: Stade Auguste-Bonal; Attendance: 9,607; Referee: Philippe Kalt

5 March 2000 Round of 16	Strasbourg	1–0	Paris Saint-Germain	Strasbourg
17:00 CET (UTC+1)	Bertin 86'			Stadium: Stade de la Meinau; Attendance: 15,302; Referee: Stéphane Bré

=== Coupe de la Ligue ===
8 January 2000 Round of 32	Paris Saint-Germain	4–3	Créteil	Paris
20:00 CET (UTC+1)	Robert 19', 45' (pen.); Rabésandratana 64'; Cissé 69'		Histilloles 13', 87'; Rabésandratana 32' (o.g.)	Stadium: Parc des Princes; Attendance: 33,269; Referee: Stéphane Moulin

29 January 2000 Round of 16	Châteauroux	0–1	Paris Saint-Germain	Châteauroux
17:30 CET (UTC+1)			Diawara 74'	Stadium: Stade Gaston-Petit; Attendance: 12,744; Referee: Stéphane Bré

20 February 2000 Quarter-finals	Paris Saint-Germain	3–0	Nancy	Paris
20:45 CET (UTC+1)	Madar 17'; Murati 76'; Robert 87'			Stadium: Parc des Princes; Attendance: 29,627; Referee: Claude Colombo

1 April 2000 Semi-finals	Paris Saint-Germain	4–2	Bastia	Paris
20:45 CEST (UTC+2)	Rabésandratana 37'; Leroy 64'; Christian 75'; Madar 90+3'		André 13'; Petersen 90+2'	Stadium: Parc des Princes; Attendance: 38,134; Referee: Gilles Veissière

22 April 2000 Final	Gueugnon	2–0	Paris Saint-Germain	Saint-Denis
20:45 CEST (UTC+2)	Trapasso 65'; Flauto 90+2'			Stadium: Stade de France; Attendance: 75,317; Referee: Éric Poulat
