= 2000–01 Paris Saint-Germain FC season =

31st season in existence of Paris Saint-Germain

Paris Saint-Germain
2000–01 season
- President: Laurent Perpère
- Head coach: Philippe Bergeroo (until 3 December 2000); Luis Fernandez (from 3 December 2000)
- Stadium: Parc des Princes
- Division 1: 9th
- Coupe de France: Round of 32
- Coupe de la Ligue: Round of 32
- UEFA Champions League: Second group stage
- Top goalscorer: League: Laurent Robert (14); All: Laurent Robert (18)
- Highest home attendance: 44,757 (vs Saint-Étienne, 9 September 2000)
- Lowest home attendance: 25,583 (vs Auxerre, 10 February 2001)
- Average home league attendance: 42,759
Home colours	Away colours

The 2000–01 season was Paris Saint-Germain's 31st season in existence. PSG played their home league games at the Parc des Princes in Paris, registering an average attendance of 42,759 spectators per match. The club was presided by Laurent Perpère and the team was coached by Philippe Bergeroo and Luis Fernández. Éric Rabésandratana and Frédéric Déhu were the team captains.

== Players ==
As of the 2000–01 season.

=== Squad ===
Note: Flags indicate national team as defined under FIFA eligibility rules; some limited exceptions apply. Players may hold more than one non-FIFA nationality.

No.	Pos.	Nation	Player
1	GK	FRA	Dominique Casagrande
3	MF	BRA	Vampeta
4	MF	ESP	Mikel Arteta (on loan from Barcelona B)
5	MF	FRA	Peter Luccin
6	DF	NGA	Godwin Okpara
7	FW	BRA	Christian
8	MF	ALG	Ali Benarbia
9	FW	FRA	Nicolas Anelka
10	MF	NGA	Jay-Jay Okocha
11	FW	FRA	Laurent Robert
13	DF	FRA	Frédéric Déhu (captain)
14	DF	ARG	Mauricio Pochettino
15	DF	FRA	Éric Rabésandratana

No.	Pos.	Nation	Player
16	GK	FRA	Lionel Letizi
17	DF	FRA	Jimmy Algerino
19	FW	FRA	Laurent Leroy
20	MF	FRA	Édouard Cissé
21	DF	FRA	Sylvain Distin
22	MF	RUS	Igor Yanovsky
23	MF	FRA	Pierre Ducrocq
24	DF	FRA	Bernard Mendy
25	DF	FRA	Grégory Paisley
26	DF	SEN	Aliou Cissé
27	MF	ESP	Enrique de Lucas (on loan from Espanyol)
28	FW	FRA	Mickaël Madar
30	GK	FRA	Thomas Levaux

== Competitions ==
Competition	First match	Last match	Starting round	Final position	Record							
Competition	First match	Last match	Starting round	Final position	Pld	W	D	L	GF	GA	GD	Win %
Division 1	28 July 2000	21 May 2001	Matchday 1	9th	34	12	8	14	44	45	−1	35.29
Coupe de France	20 January 2001	February 2001	Round of 64	Round of 32	2	1	0	1	2	4	−2	50.00
Coupe de la Ligue	7 January 2001		Round of 32	Round of 32	1	0	0	1	1	3	−2	0.00
UEFA Champions League	13 September 2000	13 March 2001	First group stage	Second group stage	11	4	2	5	22	19	+3	36.36
Total					48	17	10	21	69	71	−2	35.42

Source: Competitions

=== Division 1 ===
==== League table ====
Pos	Team	Pld	W	D	L	GF	GA	GD	Pts	Qualification or relegation
7	Troyes	34	11	13	10	45	47	−2	46	Qualification to Intertoto Cup second round
8	Bastia	34	13	6	15	45	41	+4	45	Qualification to Intertoto Cup second round
9	Paris Saint-Germain	34	12	8	14	44	45	−1	44	Qualification to Intertoto Cup second round
10	Guingamp	34	11	11	12	40	48	−8	44	
11	Monaco	34	12	7	15	53	50	+3	43	

Source: Ligue 1
Rules for classification: 1) points; 2) goal difference; 3) number of goals scored.

==== Results summary ====
Overall								Home						Away					
Pld	W	D	L	GF	GA	GD	Pts	W	D	L	GF	GA	GD	W	D	L	GF	GA	GD
34	12	8	14	44	45	−1	44	10	4	3	31	15	+16	2	4	11	13	30	−17

Source: Ligue 1

==== Results by round ====
Round	1	2	3	4	5	6	7	8	9	10	11	12	13	14	15	16	17	18	19	20	21	22	23	24	25	26	27	28	29	30	31	32	33	34
Ground	H	A	H	A	H	A	H	A	H	A	H	A	H	A	H	A	A	H	A	H	A	H	A	H	A	H	A	H	A	H	A	H	H	A
Result	W	D	W	L	W	L	W	D	W	D	W	W	L	L	D	L	L	L	L	W	D	D	L	W	L	L	L	W	L	W	L	D	D	W
Position	1	5	2	6	3	4	3	3	1	2	1	1	1	2	3	4	6	7	10	8	11	11	11	10	11	11	12	11	12	10	12	12	11	9

Source: Ligue 1
A = Away; H = Home; W = Win; D = Draw; L = Loss

==== Matches ====
28 July 2000 1	Paris Saint-Germain	3–1	Strasbourg	Paris
20:45 CEST (UTC+2)	Christian 39'; Fischer 53' (o.g.); Robert 68'		Ljuboja 24'	Stadium: Parc des Princes; Attendance: 39,729; Referee: Bertrand Layec

5 August 2000 2	Rennes	1–1	Paris Saint-Germain	Rennes
20:00 CEST (UTC+2)	Chapuis 29'		Dalmat 77'	Stadium: Stade de la Route de Lorient; Attendance: 23,168; Referee: Éric Poulat

13 August 2000 3	Paris Saint-Germain	2–1	Sedan	Paris
18:45 CEST (UTC+2)	Robert 13'; Christian 46'		Quint 38' (pen.)	Stadium: Parc des Princes; Attendance: 43,419; Referee: Franck Glochon

19 August 2000 4	Metz	1–0	Paris Saint-Germain	Metz
20:00 CEST (UTC+2)	Hassli 75'			Stadium: Stade Saint-Symphorien; Attendance: 19,178; Referee: Stéphane Moulin

27 August 2000 5	Paris Saint-Germain	3–1	Bastia	Paris
20:45 CEST (UTC+2)	Robert 19'; Anelka 36', 51'		Prince 74'	Stadium: Parc des Princes; Attendance: 40,985; Referee: Stéphane Bré

6 September 2000 6	Troyes	5–3	Paris Saint-Germain	Troyes
20:00 CEST (UTC+2)	Đukić 2' (pen.), 72'; Rothen 49'; Arpinon (p) 57' (pen.); Robert 69' (o.g.)		Robert 23', 33'; Anelka 74'	Stadium: Stade de l'Aube; Attendance: 15,350; Referee: Gilles Veissière

9 September 2000 7	Paris Saint-Germain	5–1	Saint-Étienne	Paris
17:15 CEST (UTC+2)	Anelka 22', 90'; Okocha 53' (pen.); Levytskyi 61' (o.g.); Christian 70'		Huard 65'	Stadium: Parc des Princes; Attendance: 44,757; Referee: Alain Sars

16 September 2000 8	Lens	1–1	Paris Saint-Germain	Lens
17:15 CEST (UTC+2)	Diouf 57'		Leroy 62'	Stadium: Stade Félix Bollaert; Attendance: 39,984; Referee: Claude Colombo

23 September 2000 9	Paris Saint-Germain	2–1	Nantes	Paris
20:00 CEST (UTC+2)	Anelka 10'; Robert 57'		Moldovan 53'	Stadium: Parc des Princes; Attendance: 43,519; Referee: Bruno Coué

30 September 2000 10	Guingamp	1–1	Paris Saint-Germain	Guingamp
17:15 CEST (UTC+2)	Rodriguez 60' (pen.)		Luccin 88'	Stadium: Stade de Roudourou; Attendance: 17,136; Referee: Dominique Fraise

13 October 2000 11	Paris Saint-Germain	2–0	Marseille	Paris
20:45 CEST (UTC+2)	Robert 62'; Christian 90'			Stadium: Parc des Princes; Attendance: 44,084; Referee: Éric Poulat

21 October 2000 12	Toulouse	2–3	Paris Saint-Germain	Toulouse
17:15 CEST (UTC+2)	Dieuze 24', 42'		Robert 13', 77'; Rabesandratana 71'	Stadium: Stadium de Toulouse; Attendance: 29,200; Referee: Bruno Coué

29 October 2000 13	Paris Saint-Germain	1–2	Bordeaux	Paris
19:00 CET (UTC+1)	Ramé 68' (o.g.)		Pauleta 23', 75'	Stadium: Parc des Princes; Attendance: 43,432; Referee: Claude Colombo

4 November 2000 14	Auxerre	1–0	Paris Saint-Germain	Auxerre
17:15 CET (UTC+1)	Kapo 61'			Stadium: Stade de l'Abbé Deschamps; Attendance: 17,233; Referee: Stéphane Bré

11 November 2000 15	Paris Saint-Germain	1–1	Lyon	Paris
17:15 CET (UTC+1)	Robert 41' (pen.)		Marlet 44'	Stadium: Parc des Princes; Attendance: 43,591; Referee: Laurent Duhamel

18 November 2000 16	Monaco	2–0	Paris Saint-Germain	Monaco
15:00 CET (UTC+1)	Nonda 4', 25'			Stadium: Stade Louis II; Attendance: 12,729; Referee: Alain Sars

28 November 2000 18	Paris Saint-Germain	0–1	Rennes	Paris
17:15 CET (UTC+1)			Chapuis 30'	Stadium: Parc des Princes; Attendance: 42,747; Referee: Dominique Fraise

2 December 2000 19	Sedan	5–1	Paris Saint-Germain	Sedan
20:00 CET (UTC+1)	N'Diefi 3', 49', 51'; N'Diaye 72'; Mionnet 90'		Robert 44'	Stadium: Stade Louis Dugauguez; Attendance: 16,237; Referee: Stéphane Bré

9 December 2000 20	Paris Saint-Germain	1–0	Metz	Paris
17:15 CET (UTC+1)	Anelka 47'			Stadium: Parc des Princes; Attendance: 42,965; Referee: Bruno Ruffray

13 December 2000 17	Lille	2–0	Paris Saint-Germain	Lille
20:00 CET (UTC+1)	Sterjovski 13', 71'			Stadium: Stade Grimonprez-Jooris; Attendance: 14,719; Referee: Claude Colombo

17 December 2000 21	Bastia	1–1	Paris Saint-Germain	Furiani
20:45 CET (UTC+1)	Née 57'		Mendy 24' (o.g.)	Stadium: Stade Armand-Cesari; Attendance: 9,212; Referee: Gilles Veissière

21 December 2000 22	Paris Saint-Germain	0–0	Troyes	Paris
20:30 CET (UTC+1)				Stadium: Parc des Princes; Attendance: 41,797; Referee: Bruno Coué

13 January 2001 23	Saint-Étienne	1–0	Paris Saint-Germain	Saint-Étienne
20:00 CET (UTC+1)	Sanchez 51' (pen.)			Stadium: Stade Geoffroy Guichard; Attendance: 29,019; Referee: Laurent Duhamel

27 January 2001 24	Paris Saint-Germain	1–0	Lens	Paris
20:00 CET (UTC+1)	Cissé 7'			Stadium: Parc des Princes; Attendance: 44,495; Referee: Alain Sars

3 February 2001 25	Nantes	1–0	Paris Saint-Germain	Nantes
17:15 CET (UTC+1)	Monterrubio 58'			Stadium: Stade de la Beaujoire; Attendance: 32,740; Referee: Philippe Kalt

7 February 2001 26	Paris Saint-Germain	1–3	Guingamp	Paris
20:00 CET (UTC+1)	Pochettino 22'		Rodriguez 7'; Bourdeau 35'; Tasfaout 83'	Stadium: Parc des Princes; Attendance: 42,511; Referee: Franck Glochon

17 February 2001 27	Marseille	1–0	Paris Saint-Germain	Marseille
17:15 CET (UTC+1)	Bakayoko 74'			Stadium: Stade Vélodrome; Attendance: 56,315; Referee: Stéphane Bré

3 March 2001 28	Paris Saint-Germain	3–0	Toulouse	Paris
20:00 CET (UTC+1)	Okocha 66'; Leroy 77'; Anelka 85'			Stadium: Parc des Princes; Attendance: 41,374; Referee: Gilles Veissière

18 March 2001 29	Bordeaux	2–0	Paris Saint-Germain	Bordeaux
20:45 CET (UTC+1)	Dugarry 41'; Vairelles 62'			Stadium: Stade Chaban-Delmas; Attendance: 31,703; Referee: Bertrand Layec

7 April 2001 30	Paris Saint-Germain	3–0	Auxerre	Paris
20:00 CEST (UTC+2)	Leroy 45'; Vampeta 66'; Cissé 71'			Stadium: Parc des Princes; Attendance: 41,764; Referee: Bruno Coué

15 April 2001 31	Lyon	2–0	Paris Saint-Germain	Lyon
20:45 CEST (UTC+2)	Anderson 44'; Marlet 81'			Stadium: Stade de Gerland; Attendance: 38,366; Referee: Stéphane Moulin

28 April 2001 32	Paris Saint-Germain	1–1	Monaco	Paris
20:00 CEST (UTC+2)	Robert 74'		Simone 65'	Stadium: Parc des Princes; Attendance: 41,734; Referee: Bruno Ruffray

12 May 2001 33	Paris Saint-Germain	2–2	Lille	Paris
20:00 CEST (UTC+2)	Arteta 56'; Madar 89'		Cheyrou 12', 69'	Stadium: Parc des Princes; Attendance: 43,283; Referee: Éric Poulat

19 May 2001 34	Strasbourg	1–2	Paris Saint-Germain	Strasbourg
20:00 CEST (UTC+2)	Luyindula 51'		Robert 50', 85'	Stadium: Stade de la Meinau; Attendance: 16,469; Referee: Dominique Fraise

=== Coupe de France ===
20 January 2001 Round of 64	Thouars Foot 79	0–2 (a.e.t.)	Paris Saint-Germain	Poitiers
20:00 CET (UTC+1)			Madar 106', 117'	Stadium: Stade de la Pépinière; Attendance: 10,000; Referee: Gilles Chéron

10 February 2001 Round of 32	Paris Saint-Germain	0–4	Auxerre	Paris
20:00 CET (UTC+1)			Fadiga 1', 58'; D. Cissé 2', 68'	Stadium: Parc des Princes; Attendance: 25,583; Referee: Claude Colombo

=== Coupe de la Ligue ===
7 January 2001 Round of 32	Nancy	3–1	Paris Saint-Germain	Tomblaine
15:00 CET (UTC+1)	Moustaïd 31'; Zé Alcino 55'; Nicaise 67'		Benarbia 63'	Stadium: Stade Marcel Picot; Attendance: 10,300; Referee: Bertrand Layec

=== UEFA Champions League ===
==== First group stage ====
Pos	Team	Pld	W	D	L	GF	GA	GD	Pts	Qualification
1	(Germany) Bayern Munich	6	3	2	1	9	4	+5	11	Advance to second group stage
2	(France) Paris Saint-Germain	6	3	1	2	14	9	+5	10	Advance to second group stage
3	(Norway) Rosenborg	6	2	1	3	13	15	−2	7	Transfer to UEFA Cup
4	(Sweden) Helsingborgs IF	6	1	2	3	6	14	−8	5	

Source: UEFA

13 September 2000 1	Rosenborg (Norway)	3–1	(France) Paris Saint-Germain	Trondheim, Norway
20:45	Berg 18'; Johnsen 62'; Skammelsrud 90+2' (pen.)	Report	Christian 7'	Stadium: Lerkendal Stadion; Attendance: 13,230; Referee: Oğuz Sarvan (Turkey)

19 September 2000 2	Paris Saint-Germain (France)	4–1	(Sweden) Helsingborg	Paris, France
20:45	Anelka 25'; Robert 63'; Christian 81'; El Karkouri 90'	Report	Johansen 45+1'	Stadium: Parc des Princes; Attendance: 28,300; Referee: Hugh Dallas (Scotland)

26 September 2000 3	Paris Saint-Germain (France)	1–0	(Germany) Bayern Munich	Paris, France
20:45	Leroy 90+2'	Report		Stadium: Parc des Princes; Attendance: 42,000; Referee: Domenico Messina (Italy)

18 October 2000 4	Bayern Munich (Germany)	2–0	(France) Paris Saint-Germain	Munich, Germany
20:45	Salihamidžić 3'; Paulo Sérgio 89'	Report		Stadium: Olympiastadion; Attendance: 33,000; Referee: Vítor Melo Pereira (Portugal)

24 October 2000 5	Paris Saint-Germain (France)	7–2	(Norway) Rosenborg	Paris, France
20:45	Déhu 16'; Christian 25'; Anelka 35', 90+2'; Luccin 45+2'; Leroy 76'; Robert 87' (pen.)	Report	George 36', 38'	Stadium: Parc des Princes; Attendance: 39,550; Referee: José García-Aranda (Spain)

8 November 2000 6	Helsingborg (Sweden)	1–1	(France) Paris Saint-Germain	Helsingborg, Sweden
20:45	Persson 71'	Report	Anelka 34'	Stadium: Olympia; Attendance: 12,600; Referee: Graham Poll (England)

==== Second group stage ====
Pos	Team	Pld	W	D	L	GF	GA	GD	Pts	Qualification
1	(Spain) Deportivo La Coruña	6	3	1	2	10	7	+3	10	Advance to knockout stage
2	(Turkey) Galatasaray	6	3	1	2	6	6	0	10	Advance to knockout stage
3	(Italy) Milan	6	1	4	1	6	7	−1	7	
4	(France) Paris Saint-Germain	6	1	2	3	8	10	−2	5	

Source: UEFA

21 November 2000 1	Paris Saint-Germain (France)	1–3	(Spain) Deportivo La Coruña	Paris, France
20:45	Algerino 37'	Report	Naybet 64'; Turu Flores 70'; Makaay 90+2'	Stadium: Parc des Princes; Attendance: 31,900; Referee: Hellmut Krug (Germany)

6 December 2000 2	Galatasaray (Turkey)	1–0	(France) Paris Saint-Germain	Istanbul, Turkey
20:45	Davala 51' (pen.)	Report		Stadium: Ali Sami Yen Stadium; Attendance: 21,000; Referee: Ryszard Wójcik (Poland)

14 February 2001 3	Milan (Italy)	1–1	(France) Paris Saint-Germain	Milan, Italy
20:45	Leonardo 27'	Report	Anelka 30'	Stadium: San Siro; Attendance: 50,050; Referee: Anders Frisk (Sweden)

20 February 2001 4	Paris Saint-Germain (France)	1–1	(Italy) Milan	Paris, France
20:45	Robert 75'	Report	José Mari 90+1'	Stadium: Parc des Princes; Attendance: 41,450; Referee: Jan Wegereef (Netherlands)

7 March 2001 5	Deportivo La Coruña (Spain)	4–3	(France) Paris Saint-Germain	A Coruña, Spain
20:45	Pandiani 57', 76', 84'; Tristán 60'	Report	Okocha 29'; Leroy 43', 55'	Stadium: Estadio Riazor; Attendance: 35,000; Referee: Urs Meier (Switzerland)

13 March 2001 6	Paris Saint-Germain (France)	2–0	(Turkey) Galatasaray	Paris, France
20:45	Christian 3', 27'	Report		Stadium: Parc des Princes; Attendance: 31,250; Referee: Vítor Melo Pereira (Portugal)
