= 1998–99 CS Sedan Ardennes season =

CS Sedan Ardennes
1998–99 season
- Manager: Patrick Rémy
- Stadium: Stade Émile Albeau
- French Division 2: 2nd
- Coupe de France: Runners-up
- Coupe de la Ligue: First round
- Top goalscorer: League: Cédric Mionnet (16); All: Cédric Mionnet (17)

The 1998–99 season was CS Sedan Ardennes' 80th season in existence and the club's first season back in the second division of French football. In addition to the domestic league, Sedan participated in this season's editions of the Coupe de France and the Coupe de la Ligue. The season covers the period from 1 July 1998 to 30 June 1999.

== Pre-season and friendlies ==
Win Draw Loss

August 1998 Friendly	Sedan (France)	v	(France)
CEST (UTC+2)

== Competitions ==
=== Overview ===
Competition	First match	Last match	Starting round	Final position	Record							
Competition	First match	Last match	Starting round	Final position	Pld	W	D	L	GF	GA	GD	Win %
French Division 2	8 August 1998	29 May 1999	Matchday 1	2nd	38	18	12	8	59	31	+28	47.37
Coupe de France	23 January 1999	15 May 1999	Round of 64	Runners-up	6	5	0	1	15	5	+10	83.33
Coupe de la Ligue	28 October 1998		First round	First round	1	0	1	0	0	0	+0	0.00
Total					45	23	13	9	74	36	+38	51.11

Source: Competitions

=== French Division 2 ===
==== League table ====
Pos	Team	Pld	W	D	L	GF	GA	GD	Pts	Promotion or Relegation
1	Saint-Étienne (C, P)	38	18	14	6	56	38	+18	68	Promotion to French Division 1
2	Sedan (P)	38	18	12	8	59	31	+28	66	Promotion to French Division 1
3	Troyes (P)	38	17	13	8	48	31	+17	64	Promotion to French Division 1
4	Lille	38	19	7	12	45	35	+10	64	
5	Caen	38	16	11	11	47	39	+8	59	

Source: Ligue 2
(C) Champions; (P) Promoted

==== Results summary ====
Overall								Home						Away					
Pld	W	D	L	GF	GA	GD	Pts	W	D	L	GF	GA	GD	W	D	L	GF	GA	GD
38	18	12	8	59	31	+28	66	13	4	2	37	10	+27	5	8	6	22	21	+1

==== Results by round ====
Round	1	2	3	4	5	6	7	8	9	10	11	12	13	14	15	16	17	18	19	20	21	22	23	24	25	26	27	28	29	30	31	32	33	34	35	36	37	38
Ground	A	H	A	H	A	H	A	A	H	A	H	A	H	A	H	A	H	A	H	A	H	A	H	A	H	H	A	H	A	H	A	H	A	H	A	H	A	H
Result	D	W	D	W	L	D	D	L	L	W	L	L	D	W	W	D	W	D	D	D	W	D	W	L	W	W	W	W	W	W	W	W	D	D	L	W	L	W
Position	5	4	6	3	4	5	8	12	13	8	12	14	13	11	10	10	9	8	9	10	9	8	9	10	5	3	3	3	3	3	3	3	3	2	2	2	2	2

A = Away; H = Home; W = Win; D = Draw; L = Loss

==== Matches ====
8 August 1998 1	Saint-Étienne	1–1	Sedan	Saint-Étienne
CET (UTC+1)				Stadium: Stade Geoffroy-Guichard

15 August 1998 2	Sedan	4–0	Nice	Sedan
CET (UTC+1)				Stadium: Stade Émile Albeau

22 August 1998 3	Valence	1–1	Sedan	Valence
CET (UTC+1)				Stadium: Stade Georges Pompidou

29 August 1998 4	Sedan	3–0	Ajaccio	Sedan
CET (UTC+1)				Stadium: Stade Émile Albeau

4 September 1998 5	Amiens	3–1	Sedan	Amiens
CET (UTC+1)				Stadium: Stade Moulonguet

12 September 1998 6	Sedan	1–1	Châteauroux	Sedan
CET (UTC+1)				Stadium: Stade Émile Albeau

19 September 1998 7	Laval	0–0	Sedan	Laval
CET (UTC+1)				Stadium: Stade Francis Le Basser

23 September 1998 8	Guingamp	2–1	Sedan	Guingamp
CET (UTC+1)				Stadium: Stade de Roudourou

26 September 1998 9	Sedan	1–2	Beauvais	Sedan
CET (UTC+1)				Stadium: Stade Émile Albeau

3 October 1998 10	Wasquehal	0–1	Sedan	Wasquehal
CET (UTC+1)

9 October 1998 11	Sedan	0–1	Caen	Sedan
CET (UTC+1)				Stadium: Stade Émile Albeau

17 October 1998 12	Cannes	2–1	Sedan	Cannes
CET (UTC+1)				Stadium: Stade Pierre de Coubertin

24 October 1998 13	Sedan	1–1	Troyes	Sedan
CET (UTC+1)				Stadium: Stade Émile Albeau

31 October 1998 14	Le Mans	1–2	Sedan	Le Mans
CET (UTC+1)				Stadium: Stade Léon-Bollée

7 November 1998 15	Sedan	2–0	Niort	Sedan
CET (UTC+1)				Stadium: Stade Émile Albeau

11 November 1998 16	Nîmes	1–1	Sedan	Nîmes
CET (UTC+1)				Stadium: Stade des Costières

14 November 1998 17	Sedan	5–0	Red Star	Sedan
CET (UTC+1)				Stadium: Stade Émile Albeau

18 November 1998 18	Gueugnon	1–1	Sedan	Gueugnon
CET (UTC+1)				Stadium: Stade Jean Laville

21 November 1998 19	Sedan	1–1	Lille	Sedan
CET (UTC+1)				Stadium: Stade Émile Albeau

2 December 1998 20	Nice	0–0	Sedan	Nice
CET (UTC+1)				Stadium: Stade du Ray

5 December 1998 21	Sedan	3–1	Valence	Sedan
CET (UTC+1)				Stadium: Stade Émile Albeau

12 December 1998 22	Ajaccio	2–2	Sedan	Ajaccio
CET (UTC+1)				Stadium: Stade François Coty

16 January 1999 24	Châteauroux	1–0	Sedan	Châteauroux
CET (UTC+1)				Stadium: Stade Gaston-Petit

27 January 1999 23	Sedan	1–0	Amiens	Sedan
CET (UTC+1)				Stadium: Stade Émile Albeau

30 January 1999 25	Sedan	1–0	Laval	Sedan
CET (UTC+1)				Stadium: Stade Émile Albeau

6 February 1999 26	Sedan	2–0	Guingamp	Sedan
CET (UTC+1)				Stadium: Stade Émile Albeau

13 February 1999 27	Beauvais	0–2	Sedan	Beauvais
CET (UTC+1)				Stadium: Stade Pierre Brisson

27 February 1999 28	Sedan	2–0	Wasquehal	Sedan
CET (UTC+1)				Stadium: Stade Émile Albeau

20 March 1999 30	Sedan	3–1	Cannes	Sedan
CET (UTC+1)				Stadium: Stade Émile Albeau

26 March 1999 31	Troyes	0–2	Sedan	Troyes
CET (UTC+1)				Stadium: Stade de l'Aube

3 April 1999 32	Sedan	1–0	Le Mans	Sedan
CEST (UTC+2)				Stadium: Stade Émile Albeau

14 April 1999 33	Niort	1–1	Sedan	Niort
CEST (UTC+2)				Stadium: Stade René Gaillard

17 April 1999 29	Caen	1–3	Sedan	Caen
CEST (UTC+2)				Stadium: Stade Michel d'Ornano

24 April 1999 34	Sedan	1–1	Nîmes	Sedan
CEST (UTC+2)				Stadium: Stade Émile Albeau

1 May 1999 35	Red Star	3–2	Sedan	Paris
CEST (UTC+2)				Stadium: Stade Bauer

7 May 1999 36	Sedan	2–1	Gueugnon	Sedan
CEST (UTC+2)				Stadium: Stade Émile Albeau

22 May 1999 37	Lille	1–0	Sedan	Lille
CEST (UTC+2)				Stadium: Stade Grimonprez-Jooris

29 May 1999 38	Sedan	3–0	Saint-Étienne	Sedan
CEST (UTC+2)				Stadium: Stade Émile Albeau

=== Coupe de France ===
23 January 1999 Round of 64	Chaumont FC	0–3	Sedan	Chaumont
18:00 CET (UTC+1)			Quint 24', 57'; N'Diefi 79'	Stadium: Stade Georges Dodin; Attendance: 2,500; Referee: Hervé Piccirillo

20 February 1999 Round of 32	Dijon	0–4	Sedan	Dijon
19:00 CET (UTC+1)	Firly (penalty missed) 79'		Eduardo Oliveira 68'; Di Rocco 77'; N'Diefi 86'; Mionnet 90'	Stadium: Stade Gaston Gérard; Attendance: 6,032; Referee: Patrick Anton

13 March 1999 Round of 16	Amiens	1–2	Sedan	Amiens
20:00 CET (UTC+1)	Desgeorges 42'		Quint 31', 87'	Stadium: Stade Moulonguet; Attendance: 7,000; Referee: Philippe Kalt

11 April 1999 Quarter-finals	Olympique du Grand Rouen	0–2	Sedan	Le Petit-Quevilly
20:00 CEST (UTC+2)			Di Rocco 21'; Borbiconi 52'	Stadium: Stade Robert Diochon; Attendance: 7,200; Referee: Bruno Derrien

27 April 1999 Semi-finals	Sedan	4–3 (a.e.t.)	Le Mans	Sedan
20:00 CEST (UTC+2)	Di Rocco 76'; Quint 96'; N'Diefi 108', 118'		Bakari 41' (pen.); Chagnaud 114'; Revillet 119'	Stadium: Stade Émile Albeau; Attendance: 13,580; Referee: Marc Batta

15 May 1999 Final	Nantes	1–0	Sedan	Saint-Denis
20:45 CEST (UTC+2)	Monterrubio 58' (pen.)			Stadium: Stade de France; Attendance: 78,610; Referee: Pascal Garibian

=== Coupe de la Ligue ===
28 October 1998 Final	Caen	0–0 (a.e.t.) (6–5 p)	Sedan	Caen
CEST (UTC+2)				Stadium: Stade Michel d'Ornano
