= 2000–01 UEFA Champions League first group stage =

International football competition

The first group stage of the 2000–01 UEFA Champions League was played from 12 September to 8 November 2000. 16 winners from the third qualifying round, 10 champions from countries ranked 1–10, and six second-placed teams from countries ranked 1–6 were drawn into eight groups of four teams each. The top two teams in each group advanced to the second group stage, and the third placed team in each group advanced to round 3 of the 2000–01 UEFA Cup.

Deportivo La Coruña, Hamburger SV, Heerenveen, Helsingborgs IF, Leeds United, Lyon and Shakhtar Donetsk made their debut in the first group stage.

== Teams ==
Seeding was determined by the UEFA coefficients. Clubs from the same association were split between groups A–D and E–H, ensuring that they not play on the same day if possible.

Key to colors
Teams advance to the second group stage
Teams enter the UEFA Cup round of 32

Pot 1
| Team | Notes | Coeff. |
|---|---|---|
| (Spain) Real Madrid | | 99.799 |
| (Italy) Juventus | | 109.963 |
| (Spain) Barcelona | | 103.799 |
| (Germany) Bayern Munich | | 103.201 |
| (Italy) Lazio | | 94.963 |
| (England) Manchester United | | 89.727 |
| (France) Monaco | | 75.363 |
| (Spain) Valencia | | 69.799 |

Pot 2
| Team | Notes | Coeff. |
|---|---|---|
| (Russia) Spartak Moscow | | 65.637 |
| (France) Paris Saint-Germain | | 64.363 |
| (France) Lyon | | 60.364 |
| (Italy) Milan | | 53.964 |
| (Spain) Deportivo La Coruña | | 53.799 |
| (England) Arsenal | | 52.727 |
| (Netherlands) PSV Eindhoven | | 52.333 |
| (Turkey) Galatasaray | | 51.925 |

Pot 3
| Team | Notes | Coeff. |
|---|---|---|
| (Ukraine) Dynamo Kyiv | | 51.583 |
| (Norway) Rosenborg | | 51.050 |
| (Germany) Bayer Leverkusen | | 48.201 |
| (Greece) Olympiacos | | 45.433 |
| (Greece) Panathinaikos | | 44.433 |
| (England) Leeds United | | 43.728 |
| (Czech Republic) Sparta Prague | | 43.562 |
| (Scotland) Rangers | | 32.250 |

Pot 4
| Team | Notes | Coeff. |
|---|---|---|
| (Portugal) Sporting CP | | 30.274 |
| (Germany) Hamburger SV | | 30.201 |
| (Belgium) Anderlecht | | 27.525 |
| (Turkey) Beşiktaş | | 26.925 |
| (Austria) Sturm Graz | | 26.250 |
| (Netherlands) Heerenveen | | 24.333 |
| (Sweden) Helsingborgs IF | | 16.766 |
| (Ukraine) Shakhtar Donetsk | | 15.583 |

Notes

1. ^{TH} Champions League title holders (automatic top seed of pot 1)
2. ^{Q3} Winners of the third qualifying round

== Groups ==
=== Group A ===
| Pos | Team | Pld | W | D | L | GF | GA | GD | Pts | Qualification | RMA | SPM | LEV | SPO |
|---|---|---|---|---|---|---|---|---|---|---|---|---|---|---|
| 1 | (Spain) Real Madrid | 6 | 4 | 1 | 1 | 15 | 8 | +7 | 13 | Advance to second group stage | — | 1–0 | 5–3 | 4–0 |
| 2 | (Russia) Spartak Moscow | 6 | 4 | 0 | 2 | 9 | 3 | +6 | 12 | Advance to second group stage | 1–0 | — | 2–0 | 3–1 |
| 3 | (Germany) Bayer Leverkusen | 6 | 2 | 1 | 3 | 9 | 12 | −3 | 7 | Transfer to UEFA Cup | 2–3 | 1–0 | — | 3–2 |
| 4 | (Portugal) Sporting CP | 6 | 0 | 2 | 4 | 5 | 15 | −10 | 2 | | 2–2 | 0–3 | 0–0 | — |

Source: UEFA
12 September 2000
18:00

| Spartak Moscow (Russia) | 2–0 | (Germany) Bayer Leverkusen |
|---|---|---|
| Titov 51'; Bezrodny 89' | Report |

Luzhniki Stadium, Moscow
Attendance: 55,000
Referee: Paul Durkin (England)
12 September 2000
20:45

| Sporting CP (Portugal) | 2–2 | (Spain) Real Madrid |
|---|---|---|
| Sá Pinto 39'; André Cruz 42' | Report | Roberto Carlos 50'; Rui Jorge 76' (o.g.) |

Estádio José Alvalade, Lisbon
Attendance: 39,850
Referee: Alfredo Trentalange (Italy)

20 September 2000
20:45

| Bayer Leverkusen (Germany) | 3–2 | (Portugal) Sporting CP |
|---|---|---|
| Ramelow 65'; Brdarić 73'; Neuville 77' | Report | André Cruz 12'; Sá Pinto 79' (pen.) |

BayArena, Leverkusen
Attendance: 22,500
Referee: Knud Erik Fisker (Denmark)
20 September 2000
20:45

| Real Madrid (Spain) | 1–0 | (Russia) Spartak Moscow |
|---|---|---|
| Helguera 51' | Report |

Santiago Bernabéu, Madrid
Attendance: 32,000
Referee: Leslie Irvine (Northern Ireland)

27 September 2000
18:00

| Spartak Moscow (Russia) | 3–1 | (Portugal) Sporting CP |
|---|---|---|
| Robson 44'; Marcão 68', 82' | Report | Sá Pinto 24' |

Luzhniki Stadium, Moscow
Attendance: 56,000
Referee: Alain Hamer (Luxembourg)
27 September 2000
20:45

| Bayer Leverkusen (Germany) | 2–3 | (Spain) Real Madrid |
|---|---|---|
| Schneider 27'; Ballack 44' | Report | Roberto Carlos 32', 75'; Guti 69' |

BayArena, Leverkusen
Attendance: 22,500
Referee: Karl-Erik Nilsson (Sweden)

17 October 2000
20:45

| Sporting CP (Portugal) | 0–3 | (Russia) Spartak Moscow |
|---|---|---|
| | Report | Dimas 16' (o.g.); Titov 52', 68' |

Estádio José Alvalade, Lisbon
Attendance: 20,000
Referee: Graham Barber (England)
17 October 2000
20:45

| Real Madrid (Spain) | 5–3 | (Germany) Bayer Leverkusen |
|---|---|---|
| Guti 4', 64'; Helguera 24'; Raúl 75'; Figo 87' (pen.) | Report | Brdarić 20'; Kirsten 55'; Rink 77' |

Santiago Bernabéu, Madrid
Attendance: 59,327
Referee: Domenico Messina (Italy)

25 October 2000
20:45

| Bayer Leverkusen (Germany) | 1–0 | (Russia) Spartak Moscow |
|---|---|---|
| Ballack 52' | Report |

BayArena, Leverkusen
Attendance: 22,500
Referee: Ryszard Wójcik (Poland)
25 October 2000
20:45

| Real Madrid (Spain) | 4–0 | (Portugal) Sporting CP |
|---|---|---|
| Guti 12'; Sávio 42'; Morientes 62', 70' | Report |

Santiago Bernabéu, Madrid
Attendance: 55,029
Referee: Urs Meier (Switzerland)

7 November 2000
18:00

| Spartak Moscow (Russia) | 1–0 | (Spain) Real Madrid |
|---|---|---|
| Geremi 47' (o.g.) | Report |

Luzhniki Stadium, Moscow
Attendance: 75,000
Referee: Stéphane Bré (France)
7 November 2000
20:45

| Sporting CP (Portugal) | 0–0 | (Germany) Bayer Leverkusen |
|---|---|---|
| | Report |

Estádio José Alvalade, Lisbon
Attendance: 8,000
Referee: Oğuz Sarvan (Turkey)

=== Group B ===
| Pos | Team | Pld | W | D | L | GF | GA | GD | Pts | Qualification | ARS | LAZ | SHK | SPP |
|---|---|---|---|---|---|---|---|---|---|---|---|---|---|---|
| 1 | (England) Arsenal | 6 | 4 | 1 | 1 | 11 | 8 | +3 | 13 | Advance to second group stage | — | 2–0 | 3–2 | 4–2 |
| 2 | (Italy) Lazio | 6 | 4 | 1 | 1 | 13 | 4 | +9 | 13 | Advance to second group stage | 1–1 | — | 5–1 | 3–0 |
| 3 | (Ukraine) Shakhtar Donetsk | 6 | 2 | 0 | 4 | 10 | 15 | −5 | 6 | Transfer to UEFA Cup | 3–0 | 0–3 | — | 2–1 |
| 4 | (Czech Republic) Sparta Prague | 6 | 1 | 0 | 5 | 6 | 13 | −7 | 3 | | 0–1 | 0–1 | 3–2 | — |

Source: UEFA
12 September 2000
20:45

| Sparta Prague (Czech Republic) | 0–1 | (England) Arsenal |
|---|---|---|
| | Report | Sylvinho 33' |

Stadion Letná, Prague
Attendance: 17,666
Referee: Gilles Veissière (France)
12 September 2000
20:45

| Shakhtar Donetsk (Ukraine) | 0–3 | (Italy) Lazio |
|---|---|---|
| | Report | López 27'; Nedvěd 68'; Inzaghi 78' |

Shakhtar Stadium, Donetsk
Attendance: 31,511
Referee: Michel Piraux (Belgium)

20 September 2000
20:45

| Arsenal (England) | 3–2 | (Ukraine) Shakhtar Donetsk |
|---|---|---|
| Wiltord 45+4'; Keown 85', 90+2' | Report | Bakharev 26'; Vorobey 29' |

Highbury, London
Attendance: 33,922
Referee: Hartmut Strampe (Germany)
20 September 2000
20:45

| Lazio (Italy) | 3–0 | (Czech Republic) Sparta Prague |
|---|---|---|
| Inzaghi 35', 70'; Simeone 58' | Report |

Stadio Olimpico, Rome
Attendance: 45,100
Referee: Kyros Vassaras (Greece)

27 September 2000
20:45

| Arsenal (England) | 2–0 | (Italy) Lazio |
|---|---|---|
| Ljungberg 43', 56' | Report |

Highbury, London
Attendance: 34,521
Referee: José García-Aranda (Spain)
27 September 2000
20:45

| Sparta Prague (Czech Republic) | 3–2 | (Ukraine) Shakhtar Donetsk |
|---|---|---|
| Rosický 54'; Horňák 73'; Jarošík 82' | Report | Zubov 56'; Horňák 84' (o.g.) |

Stadion Letná, Prague
Attendance: 7,391
Referee: Konrad Plautz (Austria)

17 October 2000
20:45

| Lazio (Italy) | 1–1 | (England) Arsenal |
|---|---|---|
| Nedvěd 24' | Report | Pires 88' |

Stadio Olimpico, Rome
Attendance: 40,151
Referee: Hellmut Krug (Germany)
17 October 2000
20:45

| Shakhtar Donetsk (Ukraine) | 2–1 | (Czech Republic) Sparta Prague |
|---|---|---|
| Gleveckas 35'; Zubov 87' (pen.) | Report | Jarošík 16' |

Shakhtar Stadium, Donetsk
Attendance: 20,000
Referee: Atanas Uzunov (Bulgaria)

25 October 2000
20:45

| Lazio (Italy) | 5–1 | (Ukraine) Shakhtar Donetsk |
|---|---|---|
| López 48', 68', 90+3'; Favalli 54'; Verón 57' | Report | Vorobey 41' |

Stadio Olimpico, Rome
Attendance: 14,746
Referee: Alain Sars (France)
25 October 2000
20:45

| Arsenal (England) | 4–2 | (Czech Republic) Sparta Prague |
|---|---|---|
| Parlour 5'; Lauren 8'; Dixon 35'; Kanu 51' | Report | Labant 40' (pen.); Rosický 90+3' |

Highbury, London
Attendance: 34,397
Referee: Alain Hamer (Luxembourg)

7 November 2000
20:45

| Sparta Prague (Czech Republic) | 0–1 | (Italy) Lazio |
|---|---|---|
| | Report | Ravanelli 43' |

Letná Stadium, Prague
Attendance: 19,414
Referee: Arturo Daudén Ibáñez (Spain)
7 November 2000
20:45

| Shakhtar Donetsk (Ukraine) | 3–0 | (England) Arsenal |
|---|---|---|
| Atelkin 34'; Vorobey 57'; Byelik 66' | Report |

Shakhtar Stadium, Donetsk
Attendance: 30,750
Referee: Knud Erik Fisker (Denmark)

=== Group C ===
| Pos | Team | Pld | W | D | L | GF | GA | GD | Pts | Qualification | VAL | LYO | OLY | HVN |
|---|---|---|---|---|---|---|---|---|---|---|---|---|---|---|
| 1 | (Spain) Valencia | 6 | 4 | 1 | 1 | 7 | 4 | +3 | 13 | Advance to second group stage | — | 1–0 | 2–1 | 1–1 |
| 2 | (France) Lyon | 6 | 3 | 0 | 3 | 8 | 6 | +2 | 9 | Advance to second group stage | 1–2 | — | 1–0 | 3–1 |
| 3 | (Greece) Olympiacos | 6 | 3 | 0 | 3 | 6 | 5 | +1 | 9 | Transfer to UEFA Cup | 1–0 | 2–1 | — | 2–0 |
| 4 | (Netherlands) Heerenveen | 6 | 1 | 1 | 4 | 3 | 9 | −6 | 4 | | 0–1 | 0–2 | 1–0 | — |

Source: UEFA
12 September 2000
20:45

| Valencia (Spain) | 2–1 | (Greece) Olympiacos |
|---|---|---|
| Baraja 36'; Diego Alonso 45' | Report | Đorđević 74' |

Mestalla, Valencia
Attendance: 30,722
Referee: Anders Frisk (Sweden)
12 September 2000
20:45

| Lyon (France) | 3–1 | (Netherlands) Heerenveen |
|---|---|---|
| Anderson 2'; Houttuin 10' (o.g.); Marlet 58' | Report | Talan 35' |

Stade de Gerland, Lyon
Attendance: 22,687
Referee: Stuart Dougal (Scotland)

20 September 2000
20:45

| Olympiacos (Greece) | 2–1 | (France) Lyon |
|---|---|---|
| Ofori-Quaye 19'; Giovanni 34' | Report | Foé 88' |

Spiros Louis Olympic Stadium, Athens
Attendance: 69,048
Referee: Graham Poll (England)
20 September 2000
20:45

| Heerenveen (Netherlands) | 0–1 | (Spain) Valencia |
|---|---|---|
| | Report | González 38' |

Abe Lenstra Stadion, Heerenveen
Attendance: 14,300
Referee: Valentin Ivanov (Russia)

27 September 2000
20:45

| Valencia (Spain) | 1–0 | (France) Lyon |
|---|---|---|
| Zahovič 78' | Report |

Mestalla, Valencia
Attendance: 30,720
Referee: Stefano Braschi (Italy)
27 September 2000
20:45

| Olympiacos (Greece) | 2–0 | (Netherlands) Heerenveen |
|---|---|---|
| Giovanni 52', 69' | Report |

Spiros Louis Olympic Stadium, Athens
Attendance: 42,202
Referee: Claus Bo Larsen (Denmark)

17 October 2000
20:45

| Lyon (France) | 1–2 | (Spain) Valencia |
|---|---|---|
| Marlet 90' | Report | Juan Sánchez 45+1'; Baraja 86' |

Stade de Gerland, Lyon
Attendance: 37,669
Referee: Paul Durkin (England)
17 October 2000
20:45

| Heerenveen (Netherlands) | 1–0 | (Greece) Olympiacos |
|---|---|---|
| Jensen 83' | Report |

Abe Lenstra Stadion, Heerenveen
Attendance: 14,200
Referee: Hartmut Strampe (Germany)

25 October 2000
20:45

| Olympiacos (Greece) | 1–0 | (Spain) Valencia |
|---|---|---|
| Đorđević 65' (pen.) | Report |

Spiros Louis Olympic Stadium, Athens
Attendance: 53,059
Referee: Alfredo Trentalange (Italy)
25 October 2000
20:45

| Heerenveen (Netherlands) | 0–2 | (France) Lyon |
|---|---|---|
| | Report | Malbranque 68'; Marlet 78' |

Abe Lenstra Stadion, Heerenveen
Attendance: 14,300
Referee: Lucílio Batista (Portugal)

7 November 2000
20:45

| Lyon (France) | 1–0 | (Greece) Olympiacos |
|---|---|---|
| Laigle 2' | Report |

Stade de Gerland, Lyon
Attendance: 37,908
Referee: Günter Benkö (Austria)
7 November 2000
20:45

| Valencia (Spain) | 1–1 | (Netherlands) Heerenveen |
|---|---|---|
| Diego Alonso 10' | Report | Venema 37' |

Mestalla, Valencia
Attendance: 19,079
Referee: Michel Piraux (Belgium)

=== Group D ===
| Pos | Team | Pld | W | D | L | GF | GA | GD | Pts | Qualification | STM | GAL | RAN | MON |
|---|---|---|---|---|---|---|---|---|---|---|---|---|---|---|
| 1 | (Austria) Sturm Graz | 6 | 3 | 1 | 2 | 9 | 12 | −3 | 10 | Advance to second group stage | — | 3–0 | 2–0 | 2–0 |
| 2 | (Turkey) Galatasaray | 6 | 2 | 2 | 2 | 10 | 13 | −3 | 8 | Advance to second group stage | 2–2 | — | 3–2 | 3–2 |
| 3 | (Scotland) Rangers | 6 | 2 | 2 | 2 | 10 | 7 | +3 | 8 | Transfer to UEFA Cup | 5–0 | 0–0 | — | 2–2 |
| 4 | (France) Monaco | 6 | 2 | 1 | 3 | 13 | 10 | +3 | 7 | | 5–0 | 4–2 | 0–1 | — |

Source: UEFA
12 September 2000
20:45

| Galatasaray (Turkey) | 3–2 | (France) Monaco |
|---|---|---|
| Jardel 16'; Hagi 29'; Capone 80' | Report | Nonda 50'; Simone 62' (pen.) |

Ali Sami Yen Stadium, Istanbul
Attendance: 17,905
Referee: Arturo Daudén Ibáñez (Spain)
12 September 2000
20:45

| Rangers (Scotland) | 5–0 | (Austria) Sturm Graz |
|---|---|---|
| Mols 9'; De Boer 19'; Albertz 29'; Van Bronckhorst 72'; Dodds 85' | Report |

Ibrox Stadium, Glasgow
Attendance: 49,317
Referee: Lucílio Batista (Portugal)

20 September 2000
20:45

| Sturm Graz (Austria) | 3–0 | (Turkey) Galatasaray |
|---|---|---|
| Yuran 32'; Schopp 64', 81' | Report |

Arnold Schwarzenegger Stadium, Graz
Attendance: 15,400
Referee: René Temmink (Netherlands)
20 September 2000
20:45

| Monaco (France) | 0–1 | (Scotland) Rangers |
|---|---|---|
| | Report | Van Bronckhorst 8' |

Stade Louis II, Monaco
Attendance: 11,161
Referee: Atanas Uzunov (Bulgaria)

27 September 2000
20:45

| Galatasaray (Turkey) | 3–2 | (Scotland) Rangers |
|---|---|---|
| Bülent Akın 51'; Hakan Ünsal 57'; Jardel 70' | Report | Kanchelskis 72'; Van Bronckhorst 90+5' |

Ali Sami Yen Stadium, Istanbul
Attendance: 20,954
Referee: Pierluigi Collina (Italy)
27 September 2000
20:45

| Monaco (France) | 5–0 | (Austria) Sturm Graz |
|---|---|---|
| Simone 13', 38', 41'; Farnerud 77'; Nonda 84' | Report |

Stade Louis II, Monaco
Attendance: 7,600
Referee: Eric Romain (Belgium)

17 October 2000
20:45

| Rangers (Scotland) | 0–0 | (Turkey) Galatasaray |
|---|---|---|
| | Report |

Ibrox Stadium, Glasgow
Attendance: 49,603
Referee: Markus Merk (Germany)
17 October 2000
20:45

| Sturm Graz (Austria) | 2–0 | (France) Monaco |
|---|---|---|
| Schopp 39', 88' | Report |

Arnold Schwarzenegger Stadium, Graz
Attendance: 15,400
Referee: Graziano Cesari (Italy)

25 October 2000
20:45

| Sturm Graz (Austria) | 2–0 | (Scotland) Rangers |
|---|---|---|
| Yuran 20'; Prilasnig 90+4' | Report |

Arnold Schwarzenegger Stadium, Graz
Attendance: 15,400
Referee: Antonio López Nieto (Spain)
25 October 2000
20:45

| Monaco (France) | 4–2 | (Turkey) Galatasaray |
|---|---|---|
| Contreras 6'; Bonnal 19'; Simone 22'; Nonda 26' | Report | Hakan Ünsal 24'; Bülent Korkmaz 63' |

Stade Louis II, Monaco
Attendance: 10,690
Referee: Rune Pedersen (Norway)

7 November 2000
20:45

| Galatasaray (Turkey) | 2–2 | (Austria) Sturm Graz |
|---|---|---|
| Ergün 30' (pen.); Jardel 75' | Report | Yuran 64'; Hakan Ünsal 80' (o.g.) |

Ali Sami Yen Stadium, Istanbul
Attendance: 20,350
Referee: Karl-Erik Nilsson (Sweden)
7 November 2000
20:45

| Rangers (Scotland) | 2–2 | (France) Monaco |
|---|---|---|
| Miller 3'; Mols 52' | Report | Costinha 39'; Simone 78' |

Ibrox Stadium, Glasgow
Attendance: 50,228
Referee: Ľuboš Micheľ (Slovakia)

=== Group E ===
| Pos | Team | Pld | W | D | L | GF | GA | GD | Pts | Qualification | DEP | PAN | HAM | JUV |
|---|---|---|---|---|---|---|---|---|---|---|---|---|---|---|
| 1 | (Spain) Deportivo La Coruña | 6 | 2 | 4 | 0 | 6 | 4 | +2 | 10 | Advance to second group stage | — | 1–0 | 2–1 | 1–1 |
| 2 | (Greece) Panathinaikos | 6 | 2 | 2 | 2 | 6 | 5 | +1 | 8 | Advance to second group stage | 1–1 | — | 0–0 | 3–1 |
| 3 | (Germany) Hamburger SV | 6 | 1 | 3 | 2 | 9 | 9 | 0 | 6 | Transfer to UEFA Cup | 1–1 | 0–1 | — | 4–4 |
| 4 | (Italy) Juventus | 6 | 1 | 3 | 2 | 9 | 12 | −3 | 6 | | 0–0 | 2–1 | 1–3 | — |

Source: UEFA
13 September 2000
20:45

| Hamburger SV (Germany) | 4–4 | (Italy) Juventus |
|---|---|---|
| Yeboah 17'; Mahdavikia 65'; Butt 72' (pen.); Kovač 82' | Report | Tudor 6'; Inzaghi 36', 52', 88' (pen.) |

Volksparkstadion, Hamburg
Attendance: 48,500
Referee: Vítor Melo Pereira (Portugal)
13 September 2000
20:45

| Panathinaikos (Greece) | 1–1 | (Spain) Deportivo La Coruña |
|---|---|---|
| Warzycha 29' | Report | Naybet 84' |

Olympic Stadium, Athens
Attendance: 48,059
Referee: Hugh Dallas (Scotland)

19 September 2000
20:45

| Juventus (Italy) | 2–1 | (Greece) Panathinaikos |
|---|---|---|
| Tacchinardi 35'; Trezeguet 83' | Report | Goumas 45+2' |

Stadio delle Alpi, Turin
Attendance: 35,422
Referee: Rune Pedersen (Norway)
19 September 2000
20:45

| Deportivo La Coruña (Spain) | 2–1 | (Germany) Hamburger SV |
|---|---|---|
| Pandiani 44'; Scaloni 90+4' | Report | Barbarez 53' |

Estadio Riazor, A Coruña
Attendance: 20,050
Referee: Dick Jol (Netherlands)

26 September 2000
20:45

| Juventus (Italy) | 0–0 | (Spain) Deportivo La Coruña |
|---|---|---|
| | Report |

Stadio delle Alpi, Turin
Attendance: 35,753
Referee: Urs Meier (Switzerland)
26 September 2000
20:45

| Hamburger SV (Germany) | 0–1 | (Greece) Panathinaikos |
|---|---|---|
| | Report | Nasiopoulos 36' |

Volksparkstadion, Hamburg
Attendance: 44,363
Referee: Dermot Gallagher (England)

18 October 2000
20:45

| Deportivo La Coruña (Spain) | 1–1 | (Italy) Juventus |
|---|---|---|
| Víctor 11' | Report | Inzaghi 10' |

Estadio Riazor, A Coruña
Attendance: 25,789
Referee: Gilles Veissière (France)
18 October 2000
20:45

| Panathinaikos (Greece) | 0–0 | (Germany) Hamburger SV |
|---|---|---|
| | Report |

Spiros Louis Olympic Stadium, Athens
Attendance: 37,680
Referee: Leslie Irvine (Northern Ireland)

24 October 2000
20:45

| Juventus (Italy) | 1–3 | (Germany) Hamburger SV |
|---|---|---|
| Kovačević 56' | Report | Präger 24'; Yeboah 48'; Panadić 62' |

Stadio delle Alpi, Turin
Attendance: 35,209
Referee: Stuart Dougal (Scotland)
24 October 2000
20:45

| Deportivo La Coruña (Spain) | 1–0 | (Greece) Panathinaikos |
|---|---|---|
| Pandiani 82' | Report |

Estadio Riazor, A Coruña
Attendance: 22,326
Referee: Kim Milton Nielsen (Denmark)

8 November 2000
20:45

| Panathinaikos (Greece) | 3–1 | (Italy) Juventus |
|---|---|---|
| Sousa 7'; Basinas 58' (pen.); Warzycha 65' | Report | Inzaghi 24' |

Spiros Louis Olympic Stadium, Athens
Attendance: 66,910
Referee: Dick Jol (Netherlands)
8 November 2000
20:45

| Hamburger SV (Germany) | 1–1 | (Spain) Deportivo La Coruña |
|---|---|---|
| Mahdavikia 10' | Report | Makaay 58' |

Volksparkstadion, Hamburg
Attendance: 48,500
Referee: Alain Hamer (Luxembourg)

=== Group F ===
| Pos | Team | Pld | W | D | L | GF | GA | GD | Pts | Qualification | BAY | PAR | ROS | HEL |
|---|---|---|---|---|---|---|---|---|---|---|---|---|---|---|
| 1 | (Germany) Bayern Munich | 6 | 3 | 2 | 1 | 9 | 4 | +5 | 11 | Advance to second group stage | — | 2–0 | 3–1 | 0–0 |
| 2 | (France) Paris Saint-Germain | 6 | 3 | 1 | 2 | 14 | 9 | +5 | 10 | Advance to second group stage | 1–0 | — | 7–2 | 4–1 |
| 3 | (Norway) Rosenborg | 6 | 2 | 1 | 3 | 13 | 15 | −2 | 7 | Transfer to UEFA Cup | 1–1 | 3–1 | — | 6–1 |
| 4 | (Sweden) Helsingborgs IF | 6 | 1 | 2 | 3 | 6 | 14 | −8 | 5 | | 1–3 | 1–1 | 2–0 | — |

Source: UEFA
13 September 2000
20:45

| Rosenborg (Norway) | 3–1 | (France) Paris Saint-Germain |
|---|---|---|
| Berg 18'; Johnsen 62'; Skammelsrud 90+2' (pen.) | Report | Christian 7' |

Lerkendal Stadion, Trondheim
Attendance: 13,224
Referee: Oğuz Sarvan (Turkey)
13 September 2000
20:45

| Helsingborgs IF (Sweden) | 1–3 | (Germany) Bayern Munich |
|---|---|---|
| Johansen 90+3' | Report | Scholl 7'; Salihamidžić 48'; Jancker 55' |

Olympia, Helsingborg
Attendance: 12,623
Referee: Graham Barber (England)

19 September 2000
20:45

| Paris Saint-Germain (France) | 4–1 | (Sweden) Helsingborgs IF |
|---|---|---|
| Anelka 25'; Robert 63'; Christian 81'; El Karkouri 90' | Report | Johansen 45+1' |

Parc des Princes, Paris
Attendance: 28,303
Referee: Hugh Dallas (Scotland)
19 September 2000
20:45

| Bayern Munich (Germany) | 3–1 | (Norway) Rosenborg |
|---|---|---|
| Jancker 73'; Élber 77'; Linke 80' | Report | Sørensen 38' |

Olympiastadion, Munich
Attendance: 20,000
Referee: Juan Fernández Marin (Spain)

26 September 2000
20:45

| Paris Saint-Germain (France) | 1–0 | (Germany) Bayern Munich |
|---|---|---|
| Leroy 90+2' | Report |

Parc des Princes, Paris
Attendance: 42,009
Referee: Domenico Messina (Italy)
26 September 2000
20:45

| Rosenborg (Norway) | 6–1 | (Sweden) Helsingborgs IF |
|---|---|---|
| Johnsen 21', 29', 79'; Strand 51', 52'; S. Johansen 65' (o.g.) | Report | Prica 90+2' |

Lerkendal Stadion, Trondheim
Attendance: 13,700
Referee: Jan Wegereef (Netherlands)

18 October 2000
20:45

| Bayern Munich (Germany) | 2–0 | (France) Paris Saint-Germain |
|---|---|---|
| Salihamidžić 3'; Paulo Sérgio 89' | Report |

Olympiastadion, Munich
Attendance: 33,000
Referee: Vítor Melo Pereira (Portugal)
18 October 2000
20:45

| Helsingborgs IF (Sweden) | 2–0 | (Norway) Rosenborg |
|---|---|---|
| Jansson 32'; Álvaro 77' | Report |

Olympia, Helsingborg
Attendance: 12,587
Referee: Valentin Ivanov (Russia)

24 October 2000
20:45

| Paris Saint-Germain (France) | 7–2 | (Norway) Rosenborg |
|---|---|---|
| Déhu 16'; Christian 25'; Anelka 35', 90+2'; Luccin 45+2'; Leroy 76'; Robert 87' (pen.) | Report | George 36', 38' |

Parc des Princes, Paris
Attendance: 39,536
Referee: José García-Aranda (Spain)
24 October 2000
20:45

| Bayern Munich (Germany) | 0–0 | (Sweden) Helsingborgs IF |
|---|---|---|
| | Report |

Olympiastadion, Munich
Attendance: 19,000
Referee: Kyros Vassaras (Greece)

8 November 2000
20:45

| Helsingborgs IF (Sweden) | 1–1 | (France) Paris Saint-Germain |
|---|---|---|
| Persson 71' | Report | Anelka 34' |

Olympia, Helsingborg
Attendance: 12,583
Referee: Graham Poll (England)
8 November 2000
20:45

| Rosenborg (Norway) | 1–1 | (Germany) Bayern Munich |
|---|---|---|
| Johnsen 27' | Report | Jeremies 88' |

Lerkendal Stadion, Trondheim
Attendance: 13,965
Referee: René Temmink (Netherlands)

=== Group G ===
| Pos | Team | Pld | W | D | L | GF | GA | GD | Pts | Qualification | AND | MUN | PSV | DKV |
|---|---|---|---|---|---|---|---|---|---|---|---|---|---|---|
| 1 | (Belgium) Anderlecht | 6 | 4 | 0 | 2 | 11 | 14 | −3 | 12 | Advance to second group stage | — | 2–1 | 1–0 | 4–2 |
| 2 | (England) Manchester United | 6 | 3 | 1 | 2 | 11 | 7 | +4 | 10 | Advance to second group stage | 5–1 | — | 3–1 | 1–0 |
| 3 | (Netherlands) PSV Eindhoven | 6 | 3 | 0 | 3 | 9 | 9 | 0 | 9 | Transfer to UEFA Cup | 2–3 | 3–1 | — | 2–1 |
| 4 | (Ukraine) Dynamo Kyiv | 6 | 1 | 1 | 4 | 7 | 8 | −1 | 4 | | 4–0 | 0–0 | 0–1 | — |

Source: UEFA
13 September 2000
20:45

| Manchester United (England) | 5–1 | (Belgium) Anderlecht |
|---|---|---|
| Cole 15', 50', 72'; Irwin 32' (pen.); Sheringham 42' | Report | Koller 55' |

Old Trafford, Manchester
Attendance: 62,749
Referee: Terje Hauge (Norway)
13 September 2000
20:45

| PSV Eindhoven (Netherlands) | 2–1 | (Ukraine) Dynamo Kyiv |
|---|---|---|
| Lucius 39'; Bruggink 53' | Report | Shatskikh 6' |

Philips Stadion, Eindhoven
Attendance: 27,500
Referee: Graziano Cesari (Italy)

19 September 2000
20:45

| Dynamo Kyiv (Ukraine) | 0–0 | (England) Manchester United |
|---|---|---|
| | Report |

Olimpiyskiy National Sports Complex, Kyiv
Attendance: 65,000
Referee: Kim Milton Nielsen (Denmark)
19 September 2000
20:45

| Anderlecht (Belgium) | 1–0 | (Netherlands) PSV Eindhoven |
|---|---|---|
| Dheedene 80' | Report |

Constant Vanden Stock Stadium, Brussels
Attendance: 21,700
Referee: Antonio López Nieto (Spain)

26 September 2000
20:45

| PSV Eindhoven (Netherlands) | 3–1 | (England) Manchester United |
|---|---|---|
| Bouma 17'; Van Bommel 38'; Kežman 64' | Report | Scholes 3' (pen.) |

Philips Stadion, Eindhoven
Attendance: 28,000
Referee: Markus Merk (Germany)
26 September 2000
20:45

| Dynamo Kyiv (Ukraine) | 4–0 | (Belgium) Anderlecht |
|---|---|---|
| Husin 52'; Shatskikh 82'; Demetradze 89', 90+4' | Report |

Olimpiyskiy National Sports Complex, Kyiv
Attendance: 41,000
Referee: Alain Sars (France)

18 October 2000
20:45

| Manchester United (England) | 3–1 | (Netherlands) PSV Eindhoven |
|---|---|---|
| Sheringham 8'; Scholes 82'; Yorke 87' | Report | Van Bommel 76' |

Old Trafford, Manchester
Attendance: 66,313
Referee: Juan Fernández Marin (Spain)
18 October 2000
20:45

| Anderlecht (Belgium) | 4–2 | (Ukraine) Dynamo Kyiv |
|---|---|---|
| Vashchuk 10' (o.g.); Radzinski 38', 41'; Stoica 45' | Report | Kaladze 1'; Byalkevich 87' |

Constant Vanden Stock Stadium, Brussels
Attendance: 22,504
Referee: Herbert Fandel (Germany)

24 October 2000
20:45

| Anderlecht (Belgium) | 2–1 | (England) Manchester United |
|---|---|---|
| Radzinski 15', 34' | Report | Irwin 36' (pen.) |

Constant Vanden Stock Stadium, Brussels
Attendance: 22,503
Referee: Stefano Braschi (Italy)
24 October 2000
20:45

| Dynamo Kyiv (Ukraine) | 0–1 | (Netherlands) PSV Eindhoven |
|---|---|---|
| | Report | Ooijer 45' |

Olimpiyskiy National Sports Complex, Kyiv
Attendance: 40,000
Referee: Konrad Plautz (Austria)

8 November 2000
20:45

| Manchester United (England) | 1–0 | (Ukraine) Dynamo Kyiv |
|---|---|---|
| Sheringham 18' | Report |

Old Trafford, Manchester
Attendance: 66,776
Referee: Claude Colombo (France)
8 November 2000
20:45

| PSV Eindhoven (Netherlands) | 2–3 | (Belgium) Anderlecht |
|---|---|---|
| Ramzi 45+2', 47' | Report | Crasson 9'; Koller 37'; Youla 90+3' |

Philips Stadion, Eindhoven
Attendance: 32,500
Referee: Pierluigi Collina (Italy)

=== Group H ===
| Pos | Team | Pld | W | D | L | GF | GA | GD | Pts | Qualification | MIL | LEE | BAR | BES |
|---|---|---|---|---|---|---|---|---|---|---|---|---|---|---|
| 1 | (Italy) Milan | 6 | 3 | 2 | 1 | 12 | 6 | +6 | 11 | Advance to second group stage | — | 1–1 | 3–3 | 4–1 |
| 2 | (England) Leeds United | 6 | 2 | 3 | 1 | 9 | 6 | +3 | 9 | Advance to second group stage | 1–0 | — | 1–1 | 6–0 |
| 3 | (Spain) Barcelona | 6 | 2 | 2 | 2 | 13 | 9 | +4 | 8 | Transfer to UEFA Cup | 0–2 | 4–0 | — | 5–0 |
| 4 | (Turkey) Beşiktaş | 6 | 1 | 1 | 4 | 4 | 17 | −13 | 4 | | 0–2 | 0–0 | 3–0 | — |

Source: UEFA
13 September 2000
20:45

| Milan (Italy) | 4–1 | (Turkey) Beşiktaş |
|---|---|---|
| Coco 36'; Bierhoff 44'; Shevchenko 45+2' (pen.), 77' | Report | Tayfur 20' (pen.) |

San Siro, Milan
Attendance: 53,436
Referee: Ryszard Wójcik (Poland)
13 September 2000
20:45

| Barcelona (Spain) | 4–0 | (England) Leeds United |
|---|---|---|
| Rivaldo 10'; De Boer 20'; Kluivert 75', 84' | Report |

Estadi del FC Barcelona, Barcelona
Attendance: 90,838
Referee: Markus Merk (Germany)

19 September 2000
20:45

| Leeds United (England) | 1–0 | (Italy) Milan |
|---|---|---|
| Bowyer 89' | Report |

Elland Road, Leeds
Attendance: 35,398
Referee: Günter Benkö (Austria)
19 September 2000
20:45

| Beşiktaş (Turkey) | 3–0 | (Spain) Barcelona |
|---|---|---|
| Ahmet Dursun 38', 75'; Nouma 87' | Report |

BJK İnönü Stadium, Istanbul
Attendance: 13,600
Referee: Claude Colombo (France)

26 September 2000
20:45

| Barcelona (Spain) | 0–2 | (Italy) Milan |
|---|---|---|
| | Report | Coco 45+1'; Bierhoff 71' |

Estadi del FC Barcelona, Barcelona
Attendance: 95,000
Referee: Hellmut Krug (Germany)
26 September 2000
20:45

| Leeds United (England) | 6–0 | (Turkey) Beşiktaş |
|---|---|---|
| Bowyer 7', 90+4'; Viduka 12'; Matteo 22'; Bakke 65'; Huckerby 90' | Report |

Elland Road, Leeds
Attendance: 34,435
Referee: Vítor Melo Pereira (Portugal)

18 October 2000
20:45

| Milan (Italy) | 3–3 | (Spain) Barcelona |
|---|---|---|
| Albertini 26', 39'; José Mari 45' | Report | Rivaldo 19', 43', 68' |

San Siro, Milan
Attendance: 79,945
Referee: Hugh Dallas (Scotland)
18 October 2000
20:45

| Beşiktaş (Turkey) | 0–0 | (England) Leeds United |
|---|---|---|
| | Report |

BJK İnönü Stadium, Istanbul
Attendance: 16,021
Referee: Jan Wegereef (Netherlands)

24 October 2000
20:45

| Beşiktaş (Turkey) | 0–2 | (Italy) Milan |
|---|---|---|
| | Report | Shevchenko 38'; José Mari 43' |

BJK İnönü Stadium, Istanbul
Attendance: 15,606
Referee: Hartmut Strampe (Germany)
24 October 2000
20:45

| Leeds United (England) | 1–1 | (Spain) Barcelona |
|---|---|---|
| Bowyer 5' | Report | Rivaldo 90+4' |

Elland Road, Leeds
Attendance: 36,721
Referee: Terje Hauge (Norway)

8 November 2000
20:45

| Milan (Italy) | 1–1 | (England) Leeds United |
|---|---|---|
| Serginho 68' | Report | Matteo 45' |

San Siro, Milan
Attendance: 52,289
Referee: Kim Milton Nielsen (Denmark)
8 November 2000
20:45

| Barcelona (Spain) | 5–0 | (Turkey) Beşiktaş |
|---|---|---|
| Cocu 11'; Luis Enrique 17', 49'; Rivaldo 81' (pen.); Gabri 88' | Report |

Estadi del FC Barcelona, Barcelona
Attendance: 55,000
Referee: Urs Meier (Switzerland)
