= 1996–97 French Division 2 =

58th season of the second-tier football league in France

Division 2
- Season: 1996–97

The 1996–97 Division 2 season, organised by the LNF was won by LB Châteauroux and saw the promotions of LB Châteauroux and Toulouse FC, whereas FC Perpignan, FCO Charleville, SAS Épinal and Stade Briochin were relegated to National.

== 22 participating teams ==
- Amiens
- Beauvais
- Charleville
- Châteauroux
- Épinal
- Gueugnon
- Laval
- Le Mans
- Lorient
- Louhans-Cuiseaux
- Martigues
- Mulhouse
- Niort
- Perpignan
- Red Star
- Saint-Brieuc
- Saint-Étienne
- Sochaux
- Toulon
- Toulouse
- Troyes
- Valence

== League table ==
Pos	Team	Pld	W	D	L	GF	GA	GD	Pts	Promotion or Relegation
1	Châteauroux (C, P)	42	20	16	6	54	27	+27	76	Promotion to French Division 1
2	Toulouse (P)	42	22	9	11	61	32	+29	75	Promotion to French Division 1
3	Martigues	42	17	16	9	54	33	+21	67	
4	Gueugnon	42	19	10	13	54	47	+7	67	
5	Niort	42	16	17	9	44	36	+8	65	
6	Le Mans	42	15	17	10	49	41	+8	62	
7	Beauvais	42	15	16	11	43	43	0	61	
8	Laval	42	14	16	12	48	39	+9	58	
9	Lorient	42	15	13	14	50	50	0	58	
10	Valence	42	17	7	18	48	53	−5	58	
11	Sochaux	42	14	15	13	54	47	+7	57	
12	Mulhouse	42	14	12	16	51	49	+2	54	
13	Red Star	42	12	18	12	50	48	+2	54	
14	Toulon	42	14	12	16	50	57	−7	54	
15	Amiens	42	13	13	16	44	47	−3	52	
16	Perpignan (R)	42	11	18	13	38	42	−4	51	Relegation to Division d'Honneur
17	Saint-Étienne	42	12	15	15	48	56	−8	51	
18	Louhans-Cuiseaux	42	13	12	17	39	52	−13	51	
19	Charleville (R)	42	10	19	13	37	48	−11	49	Relegation to Championnat National
20	Troyes (T)	42	10	18	14	36	42	−6	48	Spared from relegation
21	Épinal (R)	42	6	8	28	26	75	−49	26	Relegation to Championnat National
22	Saint-Brieuc (R, D)	42	9	11	22	32	46	−14	38	Relegation to CFA 2 [fr]

Source: Ligue 2
(C) Champions; (D) Disqualified; (P) Promoted; (R) Relegated; (T) Qualified, but not yet for the particular phase indicated

== Recap ==
- Promoted to L1 : LB Châteauroux, Toulouse FC
- Relegated to L2 : SM Caen, AS Nancy, Lille OSC, OGC Nice
- Promoted to L2 : Nîmes Olympique, ES Wasquehal
- Relegated to National : FCO Charleville, SAS Épinal
- Relegated to lower divisions : FC Perpignan, Stade Briochin (Banned during the season)

== Results ==
Home \ Away	AMI	BEA	CHR	CHA	ÉPI	GUE	LAV	MFC	LOR	LOU	MAR	MUL	NRT	PER	RS	STE	SOC	SBR	SCT	TFC	TRO	VLN
Amiens		0–0	0–0	0–2	6–1	1–0	1–0	2–2	1–1	2–0	0–0	1–0	2–1	2–2	1–0	2–0	1–2	0–2	1–0	1–3	0–0	2–2
Beauvais	2–0		1–0	0–0	2–0	2–1	1–1	1–2	1–1	2–0	1–1	1–2	0–2	1–0	3–2	0–0	1–0	1–0 (Note: Match awarded due to expulsion of Saint-Brieuc.)	2–0	3–0	1–0	0–0
Charleville	0–0	2–2		1–1	2–2	1–2	0–1	2–2	2–1	2–1	2–0	0–1	1–1	0–2	1–1	0–1	1–1	1–0	0–3	1–0	2–2	1–0
Châteauroux	3–1	1–1	1–0		2–0	1–0	4–1	1–1	4–0	2–0	1–0	1–1	2–0	0–0	0–0	5–3	1–0	2–0	1–0	2–1	0–0	2–1
Épinal	0–3	2–0	0–1	0–3		0–1	1–1	0–2	2–0	0–1	3–3	3–1	1–3	0–1	1–1	2–1	0–1	1–1	0–1	1–2	0–2	1–0
Gueugnon	4–2	2–2	0–0	1–1	3–0		0–0	3–1	1–0	0–1	1–0	4–3	1–0	3–1	1–1	4–2	1–0	2–1	2–1	0–1	0–2	3–1
Laval	1–0	2–1	0–0	0–0	4–0	3–0		1–2	1–2	0–0	0–1	0–0	1–1	1–0	3–1	0–0	4–1	4–1	0–0	2–1	2–0	4–1
Le Mans	2–0	0–0	2–2	1–1	5–1	2–1	1–0		0–3	0–1	0–0	2–0	0–0	0–0	0–1	2–0	2–1	1–0	1–1	0–0	3–0	2–0
Lorient	0–2	1–0	0–2	1–0	0–0	1–0	2–2	4–1		4–0	0–1	0–0	1–1	0–0	2–1	2–0	2–2	1–1	2–1	1–1	1–0	1–0
Louhans-Cuiseaux	1–0	2–1	0–2	0–1	0–1	1–1	1–1	2–0	2–2		0–0	0–4	0–0	1–1	0–1	3–0	2–0	1–1	0–1	2–0	1–1	3–0
Martigues	2–0	4–0	3–0	2–0	4–0	4–1	0–0	1–3	3–1	1–1		2–0	1–2	2–1	0–1	0–0	0–1	2–1	3–1	1–0	1–1	2–1
Mulhouse	3–0	1–2	2–2	2–0	3–1	1–2	0–0	1–0	2–1	2–0	1–0		0–2	6–1	2–0	1–1	0–0	0–1	2–1	1–2	2–1	1–2
Niort	1–0	1–1	2–0	1–1	2–1	0–0	1–0	1–1	2–0	1–2	1–1	1–1		0–0	1–0	0–0	2–1	0–1	1–1	1–2	3–1	2–0
Perpignan	0–0	0–0	0–0	0–0	2–0	0–2	0–4	0–0	2–1	4–0	2–1	3–0	3–0		2–2	1–0	0–0	1–0	1–1	0–1	0–0	1–3
Red Star	1–1	0–1	0–0	1–1	1–0	0–0	0–0	0–0	2–1	1–4	1–1	2–2	3–1	0–2		1–1	7–2	2–0	2–1	1–1	1–0	2–0
Saint-Étienne	0–2	2–2	1–1	2–0	3–0	2–1	4–0	2–0	2–2	0–3	1–1	2–0	0–1	2–1	3–3		1–1	1–0	2–1	1–1	0–0	1–0
Sochaux	2–0	4–1	3–0	1–1	0–0	2–2	2–0	1–1	0–1	2–1	0–0	3–0	0–0	3–0	1–1	4–1		1–1	7–2	0–0	2–1	0–1
Saint-Brieuc	1–0	4–0	4–1	0–4	1–0	0–1	0–1	0–0	0–1	0–0	1–2	0–0	0–1	2–2	1–1	2–2	1–2		1–2	0–1	1–1	0–1
Toulon	1–3	1–1	1–1	0–1	3–1	2–0	4–1	1–2	2–2	2–2	0–0	1–0	2–2	1–1	1–0	1–0	2–1	1–0		1–3	3–0	1–1
Toulouse	2–1	0–1	2–0	2–0	1–0	4–1	1–1	2–1	0–1	7–0	1–2	0–0	3–0	0–0	3–2	3–1	2–0	0–1	2–0		0–1	2–0
Troyes	2–2	1–1	1–1	1–1	2–0	0–0	2–0	1–1	2–0	1–0	0–0	2–2	0–0	1–0	0–1	0–2	0–0	1–0	5–0	0–4		0–1
Valence	1–1	1–0	1–2	1–0	0–0	0–2	2–1	3–1	4–3	1–0	2–2	2–1	1–2	2–1	3–2	3–1	3–0	0–1	0–1	0–0	3–1	

Source: Ligue 2
Legend: Blue = home team win; Yellow = draw; Red = away team win.

== Top goalscorers ==
Rank	Player	Club	Goals
1	(France) Samuel Michel	Sochaux	23
2	(Senegal) Samba N'Diaye	Saint-Étienne	19
3	(France) Bernard Bouger	Lorient	18
4	(France) Jean-Marc Ferreri	Toulon	17
5	(France) Yannick Le Saux	Red Star/Saint-Brieuc	14
5	(France) Régis Brouard	Red Star	14
7	(Algeria) Lakhdar Adjali	Amiens	13
7	(France) Olivier Pickeu	Amiens	13
7	(France) Laurent Dufresne	Châteauroux	13
7	(France) David Rincon	Mulhouse	13
