= Aliou Cissé =

Senegalese football manager (born 1976)

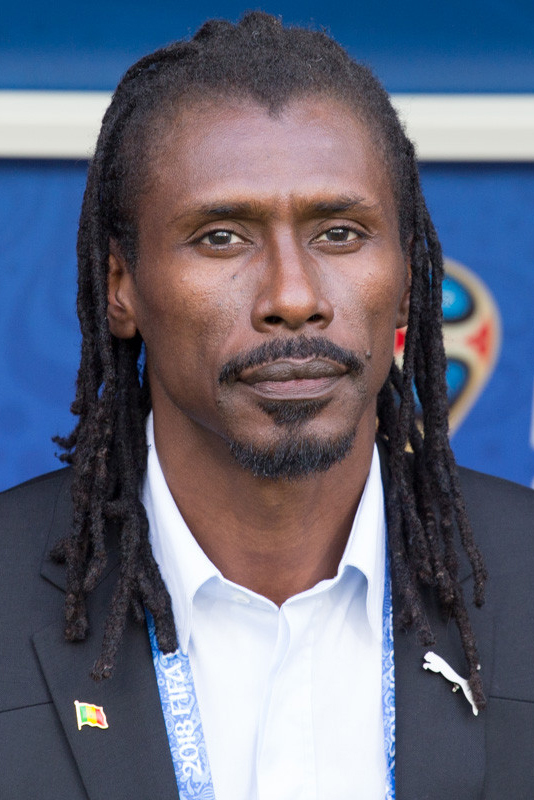
- Cissé as Senegal manager at the 2018 FIFA World Cup

Personal information
- Date of birth: 24 March 1976 (age 50)
- Place of birth: Ziguinchor, Senegal
- Height: 1.80 m (5 ft 11 in)
- Positions: Midfielder; centre-back

Team information
- Current team: Angola (manager)

Senior career*
Years	Team	Apps	(Gls)
1994–1997	Lille	6	(0)
1997–1998	Sedan	0	(0)
1998–2002	Paris Saint-Germain	43	(1)
2001–2002	→ Montpellier (loan)	17	(1)
2002–2004	Birmingham City	36	(0)
2004–2006	Portsmouth	23	(0)
2006–2008	Sedan	21	(1)
2008–2009	Nîmes	7	(0)
Total		153	(3)

International career
1999–2005	Senegal	35	(0)

Managerial career
- 2012: Senegal (caretaker)
- 2013–2015: Senegal U23
- 2015–2024: Senegal
- 2025–2026: Libya
- 2026–: Angola
Medal record
Men's football
Africa Cup of Nations
Representing Senegal (as manager)
Winner	2021 Cameroon
Runner-up	2019 Egypt
Representing Senegal (as player)
Runner-up	2002 Mali
- * Club domestic league appearances and goals

Aliou Cissé (born 24 March 1976) is a Senegalese professional football coach and former player who is the head coach of Angola national team. Cissé is best known for captaining the Senegal team which reached the 2002 Africa Cup of Nations Final and for being the first Senegal manager to win the tournament in 2022 after reaching the final in 2019.

Having begun his career in France, he later played for English clubs Birmingham City and Portsmouth. Cissé was a defensive midfielder who also, on occasion, played at centre-back.

Cissé was the head coach of Senegal from 2015 to 2024, having briefly taken charge of them following Amara Traoré's sacking, in a caretaker role in 2012. He was also the assistant coach of the under-23 side from 2012 to 2013, becoming head coach from 2013 to 2015.

== Club career ==
Born in Ziguinchor, Senegal, Cissé moved to Paris at the age of nine, where he grew up with dreams of playing for Paris Saint-Germain. He began his career with Lille before moving onto Sedan and then Paris Saint-Germain. He also spent the majority of the 2001–02 season on loan at Montpellier.

After captaining the Senegal national team to the quarter-finals of the 2002 FIFA World Cup, Cissé transferred to English club Birmingham City for their 2002–03 season, their debut season in the Premier League. Cissé made his first appearance for the club at Arsenal on the opening day of the season, but was sent off. Though the sending-off was rescinded, he went on to receive five yellow cards in six games, ultimately accumulating ten yellow cards before the New Year. His season, however, was cut short after picking up an injury in February that ruled him out for the rest of the season.

Cissé returned late to pre-season training in July 2003, which led manager Steve Bruce to place him on the transfer list. Cissé eventually got himself back into the first team picture, but his relationship with Bruce continued to sour. After Christmas, Cissé only played three more games that season. At the end of the season, he signed for Portsmouth for £300,000 on a two-year contract, despite a strong transfer link to Premiership rivals Bolton Wanderers. The transfer was ultimately one of several included in the Stevens report released in June 2007, which expressed concerns of corruption within English football. Regarding Cissé, the report stated: "Agent Willie McKay acted for Portsmouth in the transfer of Cissé and [...] the inquiry is not prepared to clear these transfers at this stage".

After two years at Portsmouth, Cissé returned to Sedan in November 2006, after undergoing a two-week trial. He then signed for French Ligue 2 side Nîmes from Sedan in September 2008. Cissé played seven games during the 2008–09 season, before retiring from club football at the age of 33.

== International career ==
Cissé captained the Senegal national team at the 2002 FIFA World Cup. After a 1–0 victory over reigning world champions France on matchday one, the team made it all the way to the quarter-finals where they lost 1–0 to Turkey. Cissé was also part of the Senegal team who were the runners-up in the 2002 African Cup of Nations, but was one of the players who missed a penalty during the shootout in the final as they lost to Cameroon.

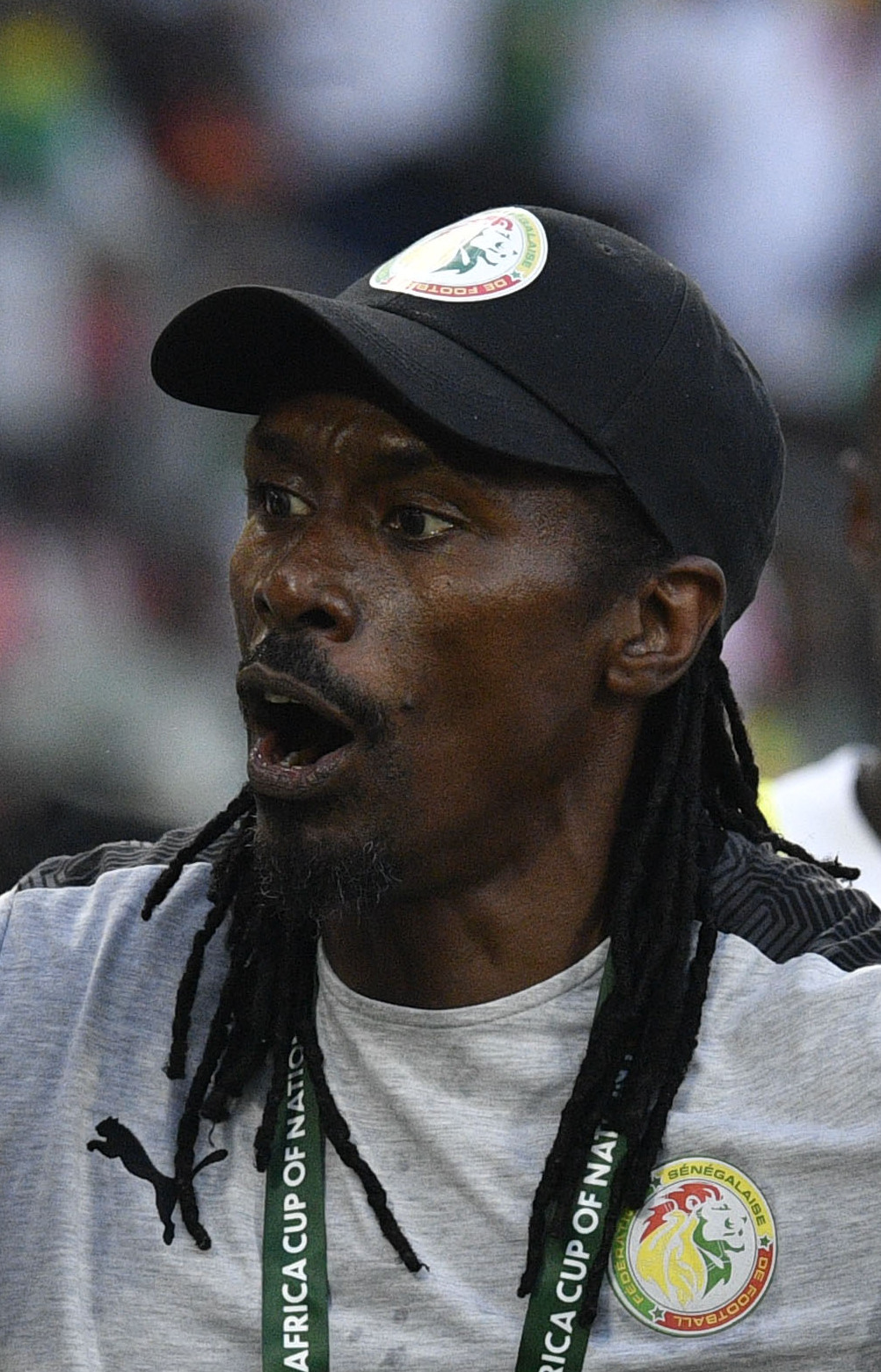
Cissé with Senegal at the 2023 Africa Cup of Nations

== Managerial career ==
=== Senegal ===
In early March 2015, Cissé was officially appointed as the head coach for the Senegal national team. The team qualified for the 2018 FIFA World Cup on 10 November 2017, with a 2–0 away win against South Africa. Ultimately, Senegal were knocked out in the group stage of the tournament after becoming the first team in FIFA World Cup history to be eliminated due to fair play tiebreaker rules. "This is one of the rules. We have to respect it", said Cissé. "Of course, we would prefer to be eliminated another way. It's a sad day for us but we knew these were the regulations." Cissé coached Senegal at the 2019 Africa Cup of Nations tournament, helping Senegal to its first final since 2002, a tournament in which Cissé himself had participated as the team's captain. However, his Senegal was defeated 1–0 in the final by Algeria, after losing by the same score in the group stage, and missed out on its first ever African trophy. In February 2019, Senegal's Football Federation (FSF) extended Cissé and his staff's contracts until August 2021. On 6 February 2022, Cissé led Senegal to victory at the 2021 Africa Cup of Nations. In the final they beat Egypt 4–2 on penalties to clinch their first title, thus redeemed himself after two previous final defeats.

In the 2022 FIFA World Cup, he led the Senegalese national team to the knockout stage for the first time since he was a player in 2002.

On 2 October 2024, Cissé was dismissed from the job as Senegal coach after the team's round of 16 exit at the 2023 Africa Cup of Nations and their underwhelming performance during the 2026 FIFA World Cup qualification, ending his nine-year tenure as the Senegal head coach.

=== Libya ===
In March 2025, Cissé was appointed the head coach for the Libya national team.

In 8 April 2026, Cissé left as the head coach for the Libya national team.

=== Angola ===
In 8 April 2026, Cissé was appointed the head coach for the Angola national team.

== Personal life ==
Cissé lost several members of his family in the MV Le Joola ferry disaster that occurred off the coast of The Gambia on 26 September 2002. To honour the lives lost, Cissé participated in a charity match between Senegal and Nigeria that raised money for the families of the more than 1,000 reported victims. Birmingham City, one of his former clubs, collected money for the victims' families and honored Cissé by displaying a giant Senegal flag during a game against Manchester City.

== Career statistics ==
=== Club ===
Appearances and goals by club, season and competition
Club	Season	League			National cup		League cup		Continental		Total	
Club	Season	Division	Apps	Goals	Apps	Goals	Apps	Goals	Apps	Goals	Apps	Goals
Lille	1994–95	Division 1	6	0	1	0	0	0	0	0	7	0
Lille	1995–96	Division 1	0	0	0	0	0	0	0	0	0	0
Lille	1996–97	Division 1	0	0	0	0	0	0	0	0	0	0
Lille	Total		6	0	1	0	0	0	0	0	7	0
Sedan	1997–98	Championnat National	0	0	1	0	0	0	0	0	1	0
Paris Saint-Germain	1998–99	Division 1	8	0	3	0	5	1	0	0	16	1
Paris Saint-Germain	1999–2000	Division 1	25	1	2	0	1	0	4	0	32	1
Paris Saint-Germain	2000–01	Division 1	10	0	1	0	1	0	0	0	12	0
Paris Saint-Germain	2001–02	Division 1	0	0	0	0	0	0	2	0	2	0
Paris Saint-Germain	Total		43	1	6	0	7	1	6	0	62	2
Montpellier (loan)	2001–02	Division 1	17	1	0	0	0	0	0	0	17	1
Birmingham City	2002–03	Premier League	21	0	0	0	0	0	0	0	21	0
Birmingham City	2003–04	Premier League	15	0	0	0	0	0	0	0	15	0
Birmingham City	Total		36	0	0	0	0	0	0	0	36	0
Portsmouth	2004–05	Premier League	20	0	0	0	0	0	0	0	20	0
Portsmouth	2005–06	Premier League	3	0	1	0	0	0	0	0	4	0
Portsmouth	Total		23	0	1	0	0	0	0	0	24	0
Sedan	2006–07	Ligue 1	11	0	3	0	0	0	0	0	14	0
Sedan	2007–08	Ligue 2	10	1	1	0	1	0	0	0	12	0
Sedan	Total		21	1	4	0	1	0	0	0	26	1
Nîmes	2008–09	Ligue 2	7	0	0	0	1	0	0	0	8	0
Career total			153	3	12	0	9	1	6	0	181	4

=== Managerial ===
As of matches played 17 November 2026

Managerial record by team and tenure
Team	From	To	Record					Ref
Team	From	To	P	W	D	L	Win %	Ref
Senegal	5 March 2015	2 October 2024	136	82	33	21	60.29	
Libya	12 March 2025	8 April 2026	8	3	5	0	37.50	
Angola	8 April 2026	present	6	4	2	0	66.67	
Total			150	89	40	21	59.33	—

== Honours ==
=== Player ===
Paris Saint-Germain

- UEFA Intertoto Cup: 2001
- Coupe de la Ligue runner-up: 1999–2000

Senegal

- Africa Cup of Nations runner-up: 2002

=== Manager ===
Senegal

- Africa Cup of Nations: 2021; runner-up: 2019

Individual

- Africa Cup of Nations Coach of the Tournament: 2021
- CAF Coach of the Year: 2022
