= Thomas Robert =

French footballer (born 2000)

Personal information
- Date of birth: 31 August 2000 (age 26)
- Place of birth: Paris, France
- Height: 1.75 m (5 ft 9 in)
- Position: Midfielder

Team information
- Current team: FC Mondercange

Senior career*
Years	Team	Apps	(Gls)
2017–2020	Montpellier II	18	(0)
2020–2021	Airdrieonians	18	(3)
2021–2022	Mouscron	3	(0)
2022–2023	Béziers	18	(1)
2023–2024	Wasquehal	9	(0)
2024–	FC Mondercange	22	(4)
- * Club domestic league appearances and goals as of 16:36, 1 June 2025 (UTC)

Thomas Robert (born 31 August 2000) is a French professional footballer who plays for FC Mondercange as a midfielder.

== Early and personal life ==
Born in Paris, Robert is the son of former footballer Laurent Robert and nephew of Bertrand Robert.

== Career ==
Robert began his career with Montpellier II, and was linked with Rangers, Celtic, and Newcastle United, before signing for Scottish club Airdrieonians in July 2020.

Whilst with Airdrieonians he had trials at a number of clubs including Rangers, Celtic, Burnley and Salford City, before signing for Belgian club Mouscron in September 2021.

After leaving Mouscron he returned to France with Béziers in October 2022, moving to Wasquehal in October 2023. He signed for Luxembourg club FC Mondercange for the 2024–25 season.
