= Laurent Robert =

French footballer (born 1975)

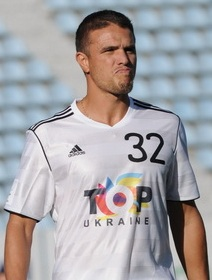
- Robert in 2011

Personal information
- Full name: Pierre Laurent Robert
- Date of birth: 21 May 1975 (age 51)
- Place of birth: Saint-Benoît, Réunion
- Height: 1.73 m (5 ft 8 in)
- Position: Left winger

Senior career*
Years	Team	Apps	(Gls)
1994–1999	Montpellier	124	(19)
1999–2001	Paris Saint-Germain	61	(24)
2001–2006	Newcastle United	129	(22)
2005–2006	→ Portsmouth (loan)	17	(1)
2006	Benfica	13	(2)
2006–2007	Levante	13	(0)
2008	Derby County	4	(0)
2008	Toronto FC	17	(1)
2008–2009	AEL	6	(0)
Total		384	(69)

International career
1999–2001	France	9	(1)

Managerial career
- 2015–2020: Montpellier (academy coach)
Medal record
Men's football
Representing France
FIFA Confederations Cup
Winner	2001 Korea/Japan
- * Club domestic league appearances and goals

Pierre Laurent Robert (born 21 May 1975) is a former professional footballer who played as a left winger. He was known for his powerful shot, particularly from free kicks.

Born in Réunion, he moved to mainland France aged 16 and began his professional career with Montpellier and Paris Saint Germain, playing and scoring in the UEFA Champions League with the latter. In 2001, he transferred to Premier League club Newcastle United for a £10 million fee, helping them qualify for several European tournaments including the semi-finals of the UEFA Cup in 2003–04. The following season, he was fined and disciplined for publicly criticising manager Graeme Souness, leading to a loan to Portsmouth and transfer to Benfica in the Portuguese Primeira Liga in January 2006. He scored a winning free kick against O Clássico rivals Porto and played in a run to the Champions League quarter-finals, but moved on six months later to Levante in La Liga. He ended his career with brief spells at Derby County, Toronto FC and Larissa.

Robert played nine games for France between 1999 and 2001, scoring one goal and winning the FIFA Confederations Cup in 2001. His younger brother Bertrand also became footballer, as did his son Thomas.

== Early and personal life ==
Robert was born in Saint-Benoît, Réunion. His father was a local footballer, who shared his reputation for free kick goals. His younger brother Bertrand was also a footballer, and also began his career at Montpellier before spending most of it in Greece. His son Thomas signed for Airdrieonians in Scottish League One in 2020. He is the brother of Fabien Robert.

== Club career ==
=== Montpellier ===
Robert played with the Réunion team that were French youth cup winners when he was 13, and league champions a year later. At 16, he moved to mainland France to play for Brest. Six months into his spell, the Breton club filed for bankruptcy, and he moved to Auxerre in December 1991. Shocked by the cold, he moved on one week later to Montpellier, so he could be with fellow Réunionnais goalkeeper Claude Barrabé; he was transported by former Montpellier player Fleury Di Nallo when Auxerre manager Guy Roux was absent.

On 20 January 1996, Robert scored his first professional goal in a 2–0 home win over Martigues, having asked manager Michel Mézy to bring him on as a substitute to take the free kick. He came off the bench for the final 15 minutes on 11 February as his team were losing 2–0 at Paris Saint-Germain, and assisted the first goal and scored the winner in a 3–2 victory that would cost his future employer the league title.

=== Paris Saint-Germain ===
After scoring 11 goals in 32 games in 1998–99, Robert was close to a transfer to Marseille, but backed out when manager Rolland Courbis said that his strategy was to rotate all of his players, including French internationals Robert Pires and Christophe Dugarry. He then signed for PSG, who had finished the previous season in 9th.

Robert continued his reputation for free kicks at PSG, where he shared responsibilities with Éric Rabésandratana. On 4 May 2000, he netted one in a 3–0 home win over Montpellier from 30 metres out. In the 2000–01 UEFA Champions League, he scored once and assisted twice in a 7–2 win over Rosenborg in what he called his "perfect match", as well as scoring a free kick against A.C. Milan in the second group stage in a 1–1 draw at the Parc des Princes.

Halfway through the 2000–01 season, when Robert was the league's top scorer with 12 goals, manager Philippe Bergeroo was dismissed and replaced with Luis Fernandez. Robert did not get along with Fernandez and in 2018, he blamed his arrival for PSG's title challenge failing. In July 2001, Robert contributed to PSG winning the UEFA Intertoto Cup, scoring four goals over the two legs of the second round against FC Jazz of Finland; he played as a forward due to injuries to Nicolas Anelka and Laurent Leroy.

=== Newcastle United ===
On 1 August 2001, Robert signed a five-year deal with Newcastle United of the English Premier League, for a fee of £10 million. Cup-tied for their Intertoto campaign, he made his debut on 19 August in the season opener away to Chelsea; his 25-yard shot in a free-kick situation was spilt by goalkeeper Ed de Goey, allowing Clarence Acuña to equalise in a 1–1 draw. On 8 September, away to rivals Middlesbrough, he won a penalty from which goalkeeper Mark Schwarzer was sent off and Alan Shearer scored, assisted a goal by Nikos Dabizas and scored his own first goal in a 4–1 win. A week later, his fifth-minute free kick opened a 4–3 win over three-times defending champions Manchester United at St James' Park. He scored five free-kick goals as Newcastle came fourth in 2001–02; as of August 2023, this remained a joint record alongside David Beckham's five for Manchester United a season earlier. Robert's 11 free-kick goals in the Premier League ranks joint sixth in all-time ranking, and his average of 994 playing minutes per free-kick goal remains the best of any player with at least 8 such goals.

On 9 February 2003, Robert opened the scoring at home to defending champions Arsenal in the 53rd minute after receiving a pass from Gary Speed 35 yards out, but was sent off within five minutes for two yellow cards in a 1–1 draw. The second yellow card was for being too close to Dennis Bergkamp's free kick, a decision for which Newcastle manager Bobby Robson took issue with referee Neale Barry. He built up a strong left-sided partnership with compatriot full-back Olivier Bernard. In one match in 2003, his shot hit Bernard in the head and knocked him out; Bernard recovered and assisted a goal but had no memory of the event.

Robert was sent off in the 40th minute of a 2–2 draw at Everton on 13 September 2003. Three months later, he scored "two contenders for goal of the season" and took the two corner kicks from which Alan Shearer scored the other two goals in a 4–0 victory against Tottenham Hotspur. In a run to the semi-finals of the UEFA Cup, he scored against NAC Breda, FC Basel and RCD Mallorca.

In April 2005, Robert publicly criticised Newcastle as not being as good as the previous season, and expressed his displeasure at being substituted. Manager Graeme Souness deemed these comments to be selfish, as they preceded a UEFA Cup quarter-final against Sporting CP and an FA Cup semi-final against Manchester United. That June, when still contracted to Newcastle, he made two interviews in The Sun, in which he criticised Souness again. He said that the team would have won the UEFA Cup if the manager were intelligent, and said that Jermaine Jenas was going to leave because of problems with the manager. He was fined two weeks' wages for each interview, totalling £180,000.

=== Portsmouth ===
Following his time at Newcastle United and a falling out with the club, Robert moved to fellow Premier League team Portsmouth in June 2005 on a year-long loan, with two additional years agreed following the completion of the loan. Portsmouth chief executive Peter Storrie said it was a permanent deal for an undisclosed fee with a release clause in case of relegation, but club chairman Milan Mandarić clarified the deal.

Robert made his debut on 13 August 2005 in a 2–0 home loss to Tottenham on the opening day, and a week later scored his only goal of 17 Pompey appearances, in a 2–1 away loss to West Bromwich Albion. On 29 October, he refused to sit on the substitutes' bench in a 4–1 win at Sunderland. It transpired that he was called up for the game as a late replacement for the injured Salif Diao, but failed to communicate that he himself was injured until the game was due to begin; he was fined while manager Alain Perrin appreciated it was a mistake. He was sent off on 26 December in a 1–1 draw with West Ham United at Fratton Park, after having set up the goal for Gary O'Neil. In his final game on 2 January 2006, he enraged manager Harry Redknapp by missing a late free kick that could have been passed for an equaliser in a 2–1 loss at Blackburn Rovers.

=== Benfica ===
On 4 January 2006, Robert signed a 2 1/2-year deal at Benfica in the Portuguese Primeira Liga. He signed on a free transfer after being removed from Redknapp's plans. Media reports suggested that Robert was signed as a potential replacement for Benfica captain Simão Sabrosa, a player in the same position who was heavily linked with a move to Liverpool.

On his first start on 11 January 2006, Robert scored in a 2–0 Taça de Portugal fifth round win at Tourizense. His first of two league goals was the game's only at home to Porto in O Clássico on 26 February, a free kick past Vítor Baía; the other six days later equalised in a 2–1 win at nearby Estrela da Amadora. Later in March, he started in both legs of Benfica's Champions League last-16 win over title holders Liverpool.

=== Levante ===
On 11 July 2006, Robert moved to Spanish La Liga club Levante on a two-year deal, having chosen them over an offer from Turkey's Beşiktaş. At his first press conference, he said "Everyone knows my game. I've been a professional for ten years and this year they will need two players to mark me". He was one of four Frenchmen to join the Valencia-based club that summer, alongside Laurent Courtois, Frédéric Déhu and Olivier Kapo.

Substituted at half time on his debut in a 4–0 loss at Sevilla, he returned 14 weeks later as a substitute against Celta Vigo and assisted Álvaro's headed equaliser in a 1–1 draw. Three days later on 20 December, he was sent off in a 2–1 loss at Osasuna. On 30 November 2007, with only 13 games to his name, he left by mutual consent.

=== Derby County ===
On 11 January 2008, Robert returned to the Premier League by signing for Derby County for the rest of the season, after impressing manager Paul Jewell on his trial. He joined a club with 7 points from 21 games and ten points inside the relegation zone. He made his first of four appearances the following day in a 1–0 home loss to Wigan Athletic, being replaced by Marc Edworthy after 59 minutes. The Rams finished the season with an all-time low of 11 points from 38 games.

=== Toronto FC ===
On 2 April 2008, Robert had his Derby contract cancelled by mutual consent and moved to Toronto FC in Major League Soccer. He had worked with their head coach John Carver at Newcastle. He played 17 league games – all bar one as a starter – and scored once on 19 April from a free kick against Real Salt Lake for the only goal of their first home game of the season. After what the Canadian Broadcasting Corporation described as "a series of uneven and uninspired performances", he was waived on 19 August.

=== Larissa ===
On 27 August 2008, Robert signed a two-year deal at Larissa of Super League Greece. He reunited with former Newcastle teammates Nikos Dabizas and Nolberto Solano. He terminated his deal a year early, saying it was because Greece was "a bit special", returned to Paris for family reasons and trained with PSG's reserves in the summer of 2009.

== International career ==
Robert appeared nine times for France, making his debut against Northern Ireland on 18 August 1999, as a 55th-minute substitute in a 1–1 draw. He was the first person from Réunion to play for France. He scored his only goal for his country on 15 November 2000 in a 4–0 win over Turkey, again off the bench in another away friendly.

Robert was selected in the France team that won the 2001 FIFA Confederations Cup in South Korea and Japan. He started in the 1–0 loss to Australia in the second group game, for which a completely new squad was picked by manager Roger Lemerre.

== Coaching career ==
After his retirement from football, Robert returned to his former club, Montpellier, where he began working as a forward coach within the clubs academy and women's section. A position he left in July 2020.

== In film ==
Robert's goal against Liverpool in the 2004–05 season at St James' Park is used as the winner against the same team in Goal!. Character Santiago Muñez (Kuno Becker) strikes it and it zooms out as Robert's free kick hits the top corner. In Goal! 2: Living the Dream..., his overhead kick against Fulham is featured as Muñez's goal at the start.

== Career statistics ==
=== Club ===
Appearances and goals by club, season and competition
Club	Season	League			National Cup		League Cup		Other		Total	
Club	Season	Division	Apps	Goals	Apps	Goals	Apps	Goals	Apps	Goals	Apps	Goals
Montpellier	1994–95	Division 1	7	0	1	0	2	0			10	0
Montpellier	1995–96	Division 1	21	5	4	0	1	0			26	5
Montpellier	1996–97	Division 1	38	1	3	0	3	2	1 (Note: Appearance in UEFA Cup)	0	45	3
Montpellier	1997–98	Division 1	26	2	1	0	2	0			29	2
Montpellier	1998–99	Division 1	32	11	1	0	4	0			37	11
Montpellier	Total		124	19	10	0	12	2	1	0	147	21
Paris Saint-Germain	1999–2000	Division 1	28	9	2	0	5	3	—		35	12
Paris Saint-Germain	2000–01	Division 1	32	15	1	0	0	0	10 (Note: Appearances in UEFA Champions League)	3	43	18
Paris Saint-Germain	2001–02	Division 1	1	0	0	0	1	0	4 (Note: Appearances in UEFA Intertoto Cup)	4	6	4
Paris Saint-Germain	Total		61	24	3	0	7	3	14	7	85	34
Newcastle United	2001–02	Premier League	36	8	3	1	3	1	—		42	10
Newcastle United	2002–03	Premier League	27	5	1	0	1	0	11	0	40	5
Newcastle United	2003–04	Premier League	35	6	2	2	1	1	14 (Note: Two appearances in Champions League, twelve appearances two goals in UEFA Cup)	3	52	12
Newcastle United	2004–05	Premier League	31	3	4	0	2	0	10	2	47	5
Newcastle United	Total		129	22	10	3	7	2	35	5	181	32
Portsmouth (loan)	2005–06	Premier League	17	1	0	0	0	0	—		17	1
Benfica	2005–06	Primeira Liga	13	2	3	1	—		4	0	20	3
Levante	2006–07	La Liga	13	0	0	0	—		—		13	0
Levante	2006–07	La Liga	0	0	0	0	—		—		0	0
Levante	Total		13	0	0	0	0	0	—		13	0
Derby County	2007–08	Premier League	4	0	0	0	0	0	—		4	0
Toronto FC	2008	Major League Soccer	17	1	—		—		4 (Note: Appearances in Canadian Championship)	0	21	1
AEL	2008–09	Super League Greece	6	0	0	0	0	0	—		6	0
Total			384	69	26	4	25	7	58	12	493	92

=== International ===
Appearances and goals by national team and year
National team	Year	Apps	Goals
France	1999	2	0
France	2000	3	1
France	2001	4	0
Total		9	1

== Honours ==
France

- FIFA Confederations Cup: 2001
