= 1997–98 Championnat National =

Championnat National
- Season: 1997–98

The 1997–98 Championnat National season was the first season of Championnat National in one group.

== League table ==
Pos	Team	Pld	W	D	L	GF	GA	GD	Pts	Promotion or Relegation
1	AC Ajaccio (C, P)	34	23	8	3	64	22	+42	77	Promotion to French Division 2
2	CS Sedan-Ardennes (P)	34	23	6	5	65	26	+39	75	Promotion to French Division 2
3	US Créteil-Lusitanos	34	22	6	6	46	21	+25	72	
4	FC Istres	34	16	10	8	61	43	+18	58	
5	Gazélec Ajaccio	34	16	9	9	52	33	+19	57	
6	Paris FC	34	14	11	9	46	33	+13	53	
7	Stade Poitevin FC (R)	34	10	15	9	43	48	−5	45	Relegation to Championnat de France amateur
8	Tours FC (R)	34	12	7	15	39	39	0	43	Relegation to Championnat de France amateur
9	RC France	34	10	13	11	33	38	−5	43	
10	US Lusitanos Saint-Maur	34	11	10	13	33	39	−6	43	
11	AS Angoulême-Charente 92	34	10	9	15	35	43	−8	39	
12	Olympique Noisy-le-Sec	34	11	6	17	30	45	−15	39	
13	Saint-Denis Saint-Leu (R)	34	9	11	14	32	42	−10	38	Relegation to Championnat de France amateur
14	Thouars Foot 79	34	8	11	15	37	42	−5	35	
15	US Raon	34	9	5	20	27	42	−15	32	
16	SAS Épinal (R)	34	7	10	17	24	54	−30	31	Relegation to Championnat de France amateur
17	SCO Angers	34	4	14	16	25	51	−26	26	
18	ES Fréjus	34	4	13	17	35	66	−31	25	
19	FCO Charleville (R)	0	0	0	0	0	0	0	0	Relegation to Championnat de France amateur
20	FC Bourges (R)	0	0	0	0	0	0	0	0	Relegation to Championnat de France amateur

(C) Champions; (P) Promoted; (R) Relegated
