= Ronny Venema =

Dutch footballer (born 1974)

Ronny Venema (born 16 October 1974) is a Dutch former professional footballer who played as a right-back.

== Early life ==
Venema was born in Meppel and grew up in Wilhelminaoord in Drenthe.

== Career ==
Venema made his debut for the first team of sc Heerenveen on 2 April 1995 at home against Ajax in a 3-3. He was right back and had Marc Overmars as his direct opponent. He then left for Veendam, but returned to Heerenveen in 1999 and stayed with the Frisian club for five more years. As a right-back Venema was part of the sc Heerenveen team that finished second in the Eredivisie in 1999-2000 under the leadership of coach Foppe de Haan and with players such as Hans Vonk, Johan Hansma, Jeffrey Talan, and Mika Nurmela. The following season they competed in the 2000–01 UEFA Champions League and Venema scored at the Mestalla Stadium in a 1–1 draw against Valencia CF. He finished his playing career at Cambuur Leeuwarden. In February 2020 Venema was coaching in Holland at VV Steenwijk.
