= Emmanuel Desgeorges =

French footballer (born 1970)

Personal information
- Date of birth: 15 May 1970 (age 56)
- Place of birth: Issoire, France
- Height: 1.74 m (5 ft 9 in)
- Position: Striker

Senior career*
Years	Team	Apps	(Gls)
1994–1995	Aurillac FCA		
1995–1996	SO Romorantin		
1996–1997	US Joué-lès-Tours		
1997–1998	FC Gueugnon	39	(13)
1998–2000	Amiens SC	58	(16)
2000–2002	FC Gueugnon	55	(7)
2002–2005	ES Wasquehal	90	(14)
- * Club domestic league appearances and goals

Emmanuel Desgeorges (born 15 May 1970) is a French former professional footballer who played as a centre forward. He played in Ligue 2 with FC Gueugnon, Amiens SC and ES Wasquehal.

He later was a trainer for RC Vichy.
