= 1998–99 French Division 2 =

60th season of the second-tier football league in France

Division 2
- Season: 1998–99

The Division 2 season 1998/1999, organised by the LNF was won by AS Saint-Étienne and saw the promotions of AS Saint-Étienne, CS Sedan Ardennes and Troyes AC, whereas Red Star Saint-Ouen and AS Beauvais were relegated to National.

== 20 participating teams ==
- Ajaccio
- Amiens
- Beauvais
- Caen
- Cannes
- Châteauroux
- Gueugnon
- Guingamp
- Laval
- Le Mans
- Lille
- Nice
- Nîmes
- Niort
- Red Star
- Saint-Étienne
- Sedan
- Troyes
- Valence
- Wasquehal

== League table ==
Pos	Team	Pld	W	D	L	GF	GA	GD	Pts	Promotion or Relegation
1	Saint-Étienne (C, P)	38	18	14	6	56	38	+18	68	Promotion to French Division 1
2	Sedan (P)	38	18	12	8	59	31	+28	66	Promotion to French Division 1
3	Troyes (P)	38	17	13	8	48	31	+17	64	Promotion to French Division 1
4	Lille	38	19	7	12	45	35	+10	64	
5	Caen	38	16	11	11	47	39	+8	59	
6	Gueugnon	38	14	15	9	44	39	+5	57	
7	Guingamp	38	14	11	13	36	38	−2	53	
8	Châteauroux	38	12	15	11	38	38	0	51	
9	Ajaccio	38	13	12	13	49	56	−7	51	
10	Laval	38	12	14	12	37	35	+2	50	
11	Niort	38	11	15	12	41	40	+1	48	
12	Cannes	38	12	11	15	34	45	−11	47	
13	Nîmes	38	11	13	14	49	46	+3	46	
14	Nice	38	11	13	14	31	34	−3	46	
15	Wasquehal	38	11	12	15	35	41	−6	45	
16	Amiens	38	11	11	16	39	43	−4	44	
17	Le Mans	38	9	15	14	41	41	0	42	
18	Valence	38	10	10	18	41	56	−15	40	
19	Red Star (R)	38	9	12	17	52	72	−20	39	Relegation to Championnat National [fr]
20	Beauvais (R)	38	10	8	20	43	67	−24	38	Relegation to Championnat National [fr]

Source: Ligue 2
(C) Champions; (P) Promoted; (R) Relegated

== Recap ==
- Promoted to L1 : AS Saint-Étienne, CS Sedan Ardennes, Troyes AC
- Relegated to L2 : FC Lorient, FC Sochaux-Montbéliard, Toulouse FC
- Promoted to L2 : CS Louhans-Cuiseaux, US Créteil
- Relegated to National : Red Star Saint-Ouen, AS Beauvais (ASOA Valence were not relegated because Gazélec Ajaccio was not allowed to compete in Division 2)

== Results ==
Home \ Away	ACA	AMI	BEA	CAE	CAN	CHA	GUE	GUI	LAV	MFC	LIL	NIC	NMS	NRT	RS	STE	SED	TRO	VLN	WAS
Ajaccio		1–1	2–1	2–1	0–0	1–0	1–3	1–3	1–0	4–1	0–2	0–0	2–1	1–1	4–3	1–1	2–2	0–3	0–0	1–1
Amiens	0–2		1–1	3–1	2–0	3–0	1–0	1–0	1–1	0–2	1–3	0–1	1–1	0–2	3–0	3–0	3–1	0–2	3–1	2–5
Beauvais	3–1	3–2		3–1	3–1	2–2	1–1	0–2	1–1	2–0	1–0	0–3	3–1	3–2	1–1	1–2	0–2	0–3	0–5	1–0
Caen	1–1	0–0	2–0		1–0	1–0	1–1	4–1	2–1	3–2	0–1	2–0	3–2	3–1	3–1	1–1	1–3	2–0	1–1	2–0
Cannes	1–0	1–0	1–0	1–1		0–1	0–0	0–1	0–0	1–0	1–0	0–1	1–0	0–3	1–1	0–0	2–1	0–2	1–1	3–2
Châteauroux	0–1	0–0	1–1	2–1	1–1		2–1	2–1	1–0	1–1	0–1	0–0	1–0	2–1	1–4	0–2	1–0	0–1	5–0	0–0
Gueugnon	3–1	1–0	1–0	2–1	1–0	2–1		0–0	1–1	1–1	0–1	2–0	2–2	1–1	1–1	4–1	1–1	1–0	2–1	1–0
Guingamp	1–2	2–2	3–0	0–0	0–0	1–4	0–2		1–3	1–1	0–2	2–0	0–0	2–0	2–1	1–0	2–1	2–0	0–2	0–1
Laval	2–1	1–0	2–1	2–1	1–2	1–2	1–1	0–1		0–0	1–0	1–0	2–1	1–1	4–2	1–1	0–0	0–1	0–1	1–0
Le Mans	0–0	1–0	1–1	2–1	1–0	1–1	2–2	0–1	0–0		2–1	1–0	4–0	0–0	1–2	1–2	1–2	2–2	6–0	1–1
Lille	1–3	0–1	1–0	0–0	0–2	2–2	1–0	1–2	2–1	3–3		2–0	3–0	1–0	2–0	1–2	1–0	1–0	2–1	1–1
Nice	3–0	0–0	1–1	0–0	0–3	1–1	4–0	0–0	1–3	2–0	0–0		2–1	0–0	3–0	0–1	0–0	0–0	2–0	0–2
Nîmes	2–1	3–0	4–0	3–1	4–1	0–0	0–0	0–0	0–1	1–1	3–0	0–1		1–1	2–0	3–3	1–1	2–2	3–0	1–2
Niort	1–4	1–0	4–0	1–2	3–2	3–0	3–1	1–1	0–0	0–0	0–0	1–0	0–1		3–1	1–0	1–1	1–1	1–0	1–1
Red Star	1–1	1–4	4–3	0–0	1–1	1–1	2–2	0–0	3–1	1–0	2–3	3–2	1–2	2–0		1–2	3–2	2–2	1–2	0–0
Saint-Étienne	2–2	0–0	2–1	2–0	6–1	0–0	3–0	0–0	1–1	1–0	3–2	0–2	3–1	2–0	2–1		1–1	0–0	1–0	3–0
Sedan	3–0	1–0	1–2	0–1	3–1	1–1	2–1	2–0	1–0	1–0	1–1	4–0	1–1	2–0	5–0	3–0		1–1	3–1	2–0
Troyes	0–4	3–0	2–1	0–1	2–1	0–0	0–0	2–1	1–1	2–1	1–0	2–0	1–0	1–1	3–1	1–1	0–2		0–0	3–0
Valence	4–1	1–1	3–2	0–1	1–3	1–2	1–2	2–0	2–1	0–1	1–2	0–0	1–1	2–0	1–1	2–2	1–1	0–3		2–0
Wasquehal	4–0	0–0	1–0	0–0	1–1	1–0	1–0	1–2	0–0	1–0	0–1	2–2	0–1	1–1	2–3	1–3	0–1	2–1	1–0	

Source: Ligue 2
Legend: Blue = home team win; Yellow = draw; Red = away team win.

== Top goalscorers ==
Rank	Player	Club	Goals
1	(Ivory Coast) Hamed Diallo	Laval	20
2	(Senegal) Lamine Sakho	Nîmes	18
3	(France) Cédric Mionnet	Sedan	16
3	(France) Samuel Boutal	Caen	16
5	(France) Laurent Peyrelade	Lille	15
6	(France) David Faderne	Ajaccio	13
6	(Croatia) Dado Pršo	Ajaccio	13
6	(France) Patrick Revelles	Saint-Étienne	13
6	(France) Joël Bossis	Niort	13
6	(Armenia) Éric Assadourian	Beauvais	13
