= Stade Émile Albeau =

Demolished multi-use stadium in Sedan, France

Stade Emile Albeau
- Interactive map of Stade Emile Albeau
- Full name: Stade Emile Albeau
- Location: Sedan, France
- Owner: CS Sedan Ardennes
- Operator: CS Sedan Ardennes
- Capacity: 17,000

Construction
- Closed: 2000
- Demolished: 2000

Tenant
- CS Sedan Ardennes

Stade Emile Albeau was a multi-use stadium in Sedan, France. It was initially used as the stadium of CS Sedan Ardennes matches. It was replaced by the current Stade Louis Dugauguez in 2000. The capacity of the stadium was 17,000 spectators.

== History ==
The Émile-Albeau stadium has been in use since 1953, the first year of UA Sedan-Torcy's professional soccer section. The stadium's main stand, built five years earlier to replace a wooden one, was completed in 1955 with the construction of a "Grande Tribune". The stadium was the site of two French Cup victories in 1956 and 1961. In 1961, the club competed in the European Cup Winners' Cup, and 18,000 spectators attended the first-round match against Spain's Atlético Madrid, which remains the record for attendance at the Émile Albeau stadium (the record was broken on May 12, 2006 against Guingamp in the new stadium). In 1973, the stadium officially had a capacity of 18,000, including 3,000 seats.
