= Mickaël Madar =

French footballer (born 1968)

Personal information
- Full name: Mickaël Madar
- Date of birth: 8 May 1968 (age 58)
- Place of birth: Paris, France
- Height: 1.80 m (5 ft 11 in)
- Position: Striker

Youth career
- Paris FC
- Sochaux

Senior career*
Years	Team	Apps	(Gls)
1987–1989	Sochaux	30	(8)
1989–1990	Laval	29	(9)
1990–1992	Sochaux	40	(3)
1992–1994	Cannes	54	(26)
1994–1996	Monaco	52	(14)
1996–1997	Deportivo La Coruña	17	(3)
1997–1998	Everton	19	(6)
1998–2001	Paris Saint-Germain	35	(12)
2001–2002	Créteil	11	(2)
Total		287	(83)

International career
1995–1996	France	3	(1)
- * Club domestic league appearances and goals

Mickaël Madar (born 8 May 1968) is a French former professional footballer who played as a striker. He played for the France national team. Madar works as a football pundit on French TV channel Canal+.

== Career ==
Madar was born in Paris, France, and is Jewish.

He began his professional career with Sochaux. Madar then spent one season with Laval before returning to Sochaux.

In 1992, Madar moved to Cannes before moving to Monaco in 1994. In 1996, he moved to Spain and signed for Deportivo de La Coruña, He was out for a year with a broken leg. After a season he had a confrontation with the new coach Carlos Alberto Silva (who came in summer 1997 to replace John Toshack), and Deportivo decided to let him go.

After recovering from his injury, Madar left Spain for England where he was signed by then-Everton manager Howard Kendall in January 1998. Over the next 12 months, and two partial seasons, he played 19 league games for the club, scoring six goals, including one on his debut against Crystal Palace, as well as missing an open goal in the Merseyside derby when Everton were leading 1–0 (the match finished 1-1).

In December 1998 Madar moved to Paris Saint-Germain. Then in 2001 he transferred to Créteil. Madar retired at the end of the season in 2002.

Madar was picked three times for France national football team, and was in the French squad for Euro 96.

== Post-football career ==
After playing football, Madar has worked as a football pundit on French TV channel Canal+. He also owns a women's clothes shop.

== See also ==
- List of select Jewish football (association; soccer) players
