= Slađan Đukić =

Serbian footballer (born 1966)

Personal information
- Full name: Slađan Đukić
- Date of birth: 21 December 1966 (age 59)
- Place of birth: Ploča, SR Serbia, SFR Yugoslavia
- Height: 1.85 m (6 ft 1 in)
- Position: Forward

Youth career
- Proleter Banatski Karlovac

Senior career*
Years	Team	Apps	(Gls)
198x–198x	Vršac		
1989–1990	OFK Kikinda	31	(0)
1991–1992	Partizan	13	(1)
1991	→ Zemun (loan)	6	(0)
1992	→ Budućnost Titograd (loan)	13	(3)
1992–1993	OFK Kikinda	27	(7)
1993–1995	Brest		
1995–1997	Lorient	66	(10)
1997–2001	Troyes	137	(51)
2002	Nîmes	11	(0)
Total		304+	(72+)
- * Club domestic league appearances and goals

Slađan Đukić (Serbian Cyrillic: Слађан Ђукић; born 21 December 1966) is a Serbian former professional footballer who played as a forward. He is best remembered for his time at Troyes, helping the club become the UEFA Intertoto Cup joint winners in 2001.

== Career ==
Đukić started out at Proleter Banatski Karlovac, making his first-team debut at the age of 18. He also played for Vršac, before joining OFK Kikinda. In the 1991 winter transfer window, Đukić was transferred to Partizan, making 13 appearances and scoring one goal for the Belgrade side in the remainder of the 1990–91 Yugoslav First League. He was subsequently sent out on loan to Zemun and Budućnost Titograd during the 1991–92 Yugoslav First League. The next season, Đukić returned to OFK Kikinda, as the club played in the First League of FR Yugoslavia.

In 1993, Đukić moved abroad to France and signed with Championnat National side Brest, scoring 22 goals over the next two seasons. He then spent two years with Lorient in the French Division 2, amassing 66 appearances and netting 10 goals. In 1997, Đukić was transferred to Troyes, helping them win promotion to the top flight in 1999. He totaled 137 league appearances and scored 51 goals over the course of his four-and-a-half seasons with the club. In the 2002 winter transfer window, Đukić switched to Nîmes.

He acquired French nationality by naturalization on 20 December 2001.

== Honours ==
Troyes

- UEFA Intertoto Cup: 2001
