= Christian (footballer, born 1975) =

Brazilian footballer (born 1975)

Personal information
- Full name: Christian Corrêa Dionisio
- Date of birth: 23 April 1975 (age 51)
- Place of birth: Porto Alegre, Brazil
- Height: 1.86 m (6 ft 1 in)
- Position: Striker

Youth career
- 1989–1992: Internacional

Senior career*
Years	Team	Apps	(Gls)
1992	Internacional		
1992–1993	Marítimo	13	(3)
1993–1994	Estoril	7	(0)
1994–1995	Farense	30	(4)
1995–1999	Internacional	50	(38)
1999–2001	Paris Saint-Germain	53	(20)
2001–2003	Bordeaux	18	(2)
2002	→ Palmeiras (loan)	19	(8)
2002–2003	→ Galatasaray (loan)	11	(3)
2003–2004	→ Grêmio (loan)	62	(25)
2005	Omiya Ardija	15	(6)
2005	→ São Paulo (loan)	20	(8)
2006	Botafogo	5	(1)
2006	Juventude	32	(11)
2007	Corinthians	5	(5)
2007	Internacional	19	(4)
2008	Portuguesa		
2008	Pachuca	13	(3)
2009	Portuguesa	10	(1)
2010	Monte Azul	5	(0)
2010	São Caetano	3	(0)
2011	Pelotas		

International career
1997–2001	Brazil	11	(0)
- * Club domestic league appearances and goals

Christian Corrêa Dionisio (born 23 April 1975), known simply as Christian, is a Brazilian former professional footballer who played as a striker.

== Career ==
Born in Porto Alegre, Rio Grande do Sul, Christian began his career with hometown's Sport Club Internacional, and moved at just 17 to Portuguese club C.S. Marítimo, representing another two modest teams in the country in the following two seasons but always in the Primeira Liga.

In 1996, he returned to Internacional, where his performances eventually awarded him a callup to the Brazil national team, and he was eventually part of the 1999 Copa América-winning squad – 17 minutes against Chile in the group stage (1–0 win) and ten against Argentina in the quarterfinals (2–1) – eventually signing with Paris Saint-Germain.

In the French capital side, however, Christian failed to perform, also being loaned to two clubs before being released in June 2003. During his two-year loan spell at Grêmio Foot-Ball Porto Alegrense the team narrowly avoided relegation to the Série B in his first year, but it befell in the following.

Subsequently, Christian represented Omiya Ardija, São Paulo FC, Botafogo de Futebol e Regatas, Esporte Clube Juventude and Sport Club Corinthians Paulista, returning to Internacional in early 2007. The following year he joined Associação Portuguesa de Desportos, then moved to Mexico's C.F. Pachuca, switching back to Portuguesa shortly after, with the club now in the second level.

== Career statistics ==
=== Club ===
Appearances and goals by club, season and competition
Club	Season	League		
Club	Season	Division	Apps	Goals
Marítimo	1993–94	Primeira Liga	13	3
Estoril	1994–95	Primeira Liga	7	0
Farense	1995–96	Primeira Liga	30	4
Internacional	1996	Série A	1	0
Internacional	1997	Série A	26	24
Internacional	1998	Série A	20	12
Internacional	1999	Série A	3	2
Internacional	Total		50	38
Paris Saint-Germain	1999–2000	Ligue 1	29	16
Paris Saint-Germain	2000–01	Ligue 1	24	4
Paris Saint-Germain	Total		53	20
Bordeaux	2001–02	Ligue 1	18	2
Palmeiras	2002	Série A	19	8
Galatasaray	2002–03	Süper Lig	11	3
Grêmio	2003	Série A	28	10
Grêmio	2004	Série A	34	15
Grêmio	Total		62	25
Omiya Ardija	2005	J1 League	15	6
São Paulo	2005	Série A	20	8
Botafogo	2006	Série A	4	1
Juventude	2006	Série A	28	11
Internacional	2007	Série A	19	4
Portuguesa	2008	Série A	5	1
Pachuca	2008–09	Liga MX	13	3
Portuguesa	2009	Série B	10	1
Portuguesa	2009–10	Série B		
Portuguesa	Total		10	1
Career total			377	138

=== International ===
Appearances and goals by national team and year
National team	Year	Apps	Goals
Brazil	1997	2	0
Brazil	1998	2	0
Brazil	1999	6	0
Brazil	2000	0	0
Brazil	2001	1	0
Total		11	0

== Honours ==
- Campeonato Gaúcho: 1991, 1992, 1997
- FIFA Club World Cup: 2005
- Campeonato Carioca: 2006

Brazil

- Copa América: 1999

Individual

- Copa Sul-Minas: Best player 1999
