= Laurent Leroy =

French footballer (born 1976)

Personal information
- Date of birth: 16 April 1976 (age 50)
- Place of birth: Saint-Saulve, France
- Height: 1.78 m (5 ft 10 in)
- Position: Forward

Senior career*
Years	Team	Apps	(Gls)
1993–1996	Valenciennes		
1996–1998	Cannes	41	(6)
1998–2003	Paris Saint Germain	67	(12)
1999	→ Servette	0	(0)
2003	→ Troyes (loan)	9	(0)
2003–2004	Neuchâtel Xamax	2	(0)
2004–2005	Cannes	14	(1)
2005–2006	Bordeaux	2	(0)
2006	US Créteil	11	(1)
2007	Shanghai Shenhua		
2007–2009	Stade Raphaëlois		
2009	Étoile Fréjus Saint-Raphaël		
2009–2011	RC Grasse		
2011–2012	Pégomas		
- * Club domestic league appearances and goals

Laurent Leroy (born 16 April 1976) is a French former professional footballer who played as a forward.

== Career ==
Leroy joined Paris Saint Germain in 1999. He did not become a regular starter in his time there. In January 2003 he joined Troyes on loan for the remainder of the 2002–03 season.
