= Cédric Mionnet =

French footballer (born 1974)

Personal information
- Date of birth: 8 July 1974 (age 52)
- Place of birth: Montreuil-sur-Mer, France
- Height: 1.74 m (5 ft 9 in)
- Position: Forward

Youth career
- US Montreuil-sur-Mer
- Le Touquet

Senior career*
Years	Team	Apps	(Gls)
1993–1996	Le Touquet		
1996–1997	Lens B		
1997–2003	Sedan	114+ (Note: Statistics are missing for the 1997–98 season.)	(37+)
2003–2004	Nice	13	(2)
2003–2004	→ Sedan (loan)	18	(1)
2004–2005	Rouen		
2005–2006	Tours	4	(0)
2006–2007	Bertrix		
2007–2008	US Bazeilles		
- * Club domestic league appearances and goals

Cédric Mionnet (born 8 July 1974) is a French former professional footballer who played as a forward. He most notably played for Sedan.

== Personal life ==
Following his retirement from football, Mionnet became responsible for the sports department of the General Council of the Ardennes.

== Honours ==
Sedan

- Coupe de France runner-up: 1998–99
