= 2001–02 FC Lorient season =

FC Lorient
2001–02 season
- President: André Jegouzo
- Head coach: Ángel Marcos (until December); Yvon Pouliquen (from December)
- Stadium: Stade du Moustoir
- Division 1: 18th (relegated)
- Coupe de France: Winners
- Coupe de la Ligue: Runners-up
- Top goalscorer: League: Jean-Claude Darcheville (19); All: Jean-Claude Darcheville (24)
- Average home league attendance: 12,212
- Biggest win: Lorient 6–2 Guingamp
- Biggest defeat: Sedan 5–0 Lorient; Paris Saint-Germain 5–0 Lorient
Home colours	Away colours

The 2001–02 season was the 75th season in the existence of FC Lorient and the club's first season back in the top flight of French football. In addition to the domestic league, Lorient participated in this season's edition of the Coupe de France and the Coupe de la Ligue. The season covered the period from 1 July 2001 to 30 June 2002.

== Transfers ==
=== In ===
No.	Pos	Player	Transferred from	Fee	Date	Source
27	DF	(Senegal) Pape Malick Diop	(Switzerland) Neuchâtel Xamax			
19	DF	(France) Jacques Abardonado	(France) Marseille	Free		
	GK	(France) Guillaume Gauclin	(France) Guingamp	Loan		
16	GK	(France) Sébastien Hamel	(France) Lens	Free		

=== Out ===
No.	Pos	Player	Transferred to	Fee	Date	Source
11	MF	(France) Ulrich Le Pen	(England) Ipswich Town			
23	FW	(Togo) Koffi Fiawoo	(France) US Créteil			

== Pre-season and friendlies ==
Win Draw Loss

21 July 2001 Friendly	Lorient (France)	2–3	(France) Marseille	Lorient
				Stadium: Stade du Moustoir

== Competitions ==
=== Overview ===
Competition	First match	Last match	Starting round	Final position	Record							
Competition	First match	Last match	Starting round	Final position	Pld	W	D	L	GF	GA	GD	Win %
French Division 1	28 July 2001	4 May 2002	Matchday 1	18th	34	7	10	17	43	64	−21	20.59
Coupe de France	15 December 2001	11 May 2002	Round of 64	Winners	6	5	1	0	10	4	+6	83.33
Coupe de la Ligue	1 December 2001	20 April 2002	Round of 32	Runners-up	5	3	1	1	8	8	+0	60.00
Total					45	15	12	18	61	76	−15	33.33

Source: Soccerway

=== French Division 1 ===
==== League table ====
Pos	Team	Pld	W	D	L	GF	GA	GD	Pts	Qualification or relegation
14	Sedan	34	8	15	11	35	39	−4	39	
15	Monaco	34	9	12	13	36	41	−5	39	
16	Guingamp	34	9	8	17	34	57	−23	35	
17	Metz (R)	34	9	6	19	31	47	−16	33	Relegation to Ligue 2
18	Lorient (R)	34	7	10	17	43	64	−21	31	UEFA Cup first round and relegated to Ligue 2 (Note: Lorient was qualified for the 2002–03 UEFA Cup as winners of the 2001–02 Coupe de France.)

Source: Ligue 1
Rules for classification: 1) points; 2) goal difference; 3) number of goals scored.
(R) Relegated

==== Results summary ====
Overall								Home						Away					
Pld	W	D	L	GF	GA	GD	Pts	W	D	L	GF	GA	GD	W	D	L	GF	GA	GD
34	7	10	17	43	64	−21	31	6	5	6	23	22	+1	1	5	11	20	42	−22

Source: French Division 1

==== Results by round ====
Round	1	2	3	4	5	6	7	8	9	10	11	12	13	14	15	16	17	18	19	20	21	22	23	24	25	26	27	28	29	30	31	32	33	34
Ground	H	A	H	A	H	A	H	H	A	H	A	H	A	H	A	H	A	H	A	H	A	H	A	A	H	A	H	A	H	A	H	A	H	A
Result	W	L	L	D	W	D	D	L	W	L	L	W	L	L	L	L	L	L	D	D	L	W	L	L	W	D	W	L	D	L	D	L	D	D
Position	5	9	11	12	8	8	8	11	9	11	13	9	10	15	16	17	17	17	17	18	18	17	18	18	18	18	16	17	17	18	17	18	18	18

Source: French Division 1
A = Away; H = Home; W = Win; D = Draw; L = Loss

==== Matches ====
28 July 2001 1	Lorient	1–0	Metz	Lorient
20:00 CEST (UTC+2)	Feindouno 82'			Stadium: Stade du Moustoir; Attendance: 10,930; Referee: Dominique Fraise

4 August 2001 2	Lille	3–1	Lorient	Lille
20:00 CEST (UTC+2)				Stadium: Stade Grimonprez-Jooris; Attendance: 15,941; Referee: Alain Hamer (Luxembourg)

12 August 2001 3	Lorient	0–1	Auxerre	Lorient
18:00 CEST (UTC+2)			Cissé 37'	Stadium: Stade du Moustoir; Attendance: 13,963; Referee: Laurent Duhamel

18 August 2001 4	Sochaux	2–2	Lorient	Montbéliard
20:00 CEST (UTC+2)				Stadium: Stade Auguste Bonal; Attendance: 15,166; Referee: Thierry Auriac

25 August 2001 5	Lorient	2–0	Monaco	Lorient
20:00 CEST (UTC+2)	Druon 17'; Darcheville 29'			Stadium: Stade du Moustoir; Attendance: 12,739; Referee: Éric Poulat

8 September 2001 6	Rennes	1–1	Lorient	Rennes
20:00 CEST (UTC+2)	Chapuis 59'		Bouard 77'	Stadium: Stade de la Route de Lorient; Attendance: 19,550; Referee: Claude Colombo

15 September 2001 7	Lorient	1–1	Paris Saint-Germain	Lorient
20:00 CEST (UTC+2)	Feindouno 78'		Anelka 88'	Stadium: Stade du Moustoir; Attendance: 14,466; Referee: Thierry Auriac

23 September 2001 8	Lorient	0–2	Bordeaux	Lorient
20:00 CEST (UTC+2)			Dugarry 56'; Pauleta 88'	Stadium: Stade du Moustoir; Attendance: 12,127; Referee: Stéphane Moulin

29 September 2001 9	Montpellier	1–3	Lorient	Montpellier
20:00 CEST (UTC+2)				Stadium: Stade de la Mosson; Attendance: 8,324; Referee: Jean-Marc Bonnin

13 October 2001 10	Lorient	2–3	Lens	Lorient
20:00 CEST (UTC+2)				Stadium: Stade du Moustoir; Attendance: 12,157; Referee: Claude Colombo

21 October 2001 11	Troyes	4–2	Lorient	Troyes
18:00 CEST (UTC+2)				Stadium: Stade de l'Aube; Attendance: 12,629; Referee: Damien Ledentu

27 October 2001 12	Lorient	6–2	Guingamp	Lorient
20:00 CEST (UTC+2)				Stadium: Stade du Moustoir; Attendance: 13,674; Referee: Jean-Marc Bonnin

3 November 2001 13	Bastia	3–1	Lorient	Furiani
20:00 CEST (UTC+2)				Stadium: Stade Armand Cesari; Attendance: 5,766; Referee: Bruno Coué

17 November 2001 14	Lorient	0–3	Lyon	Lorient
20:00 CEST (UTC+2)				Stadium: Stade du Moustoir; Attendance: 12,765; Referee: Hervé Piccirillo

24 November 2001 15	Sedan	5–0	Lorient	Sedan
20:00 CEST (UTC+2)				Stadium: Stade Louis Dugauguez; Attendance: 14,757; Referee: Claude Colombo

28 November 2001 16	Lorient	1–2	Nantes	Lorient
20:30 CEST (UTC+2)	Guel 22'		André 73'; Vahirua 85'	Stadium: Stade du Moustoir; Attendance: 14,687; Referee: Pascal Viléo

8 December 2001 17	Marseille	3–2	Lorient	Marseille
20:00 CEST (UTC+2)				Stadium: Stade Vélodrome; Attendance: 47,703; Referee: Pascal Garibian

19 December 2001 18	Lorient	2–4	Lille	Lorient
20:30 CEST (UTC+2)				Stadium: Stade du Moustoir; Attendance: 9,404; Referee: Jean-Marc Bonnin

5 January 2002 20	Lorient	1–1	Sochaux	Lorient
20:00 CEST (UTC+2)				Stadium: Stade du Moustoir; Attendance: 9,289; Referee: Alain Sars

12 January 2002 21	Monaco	1–0	Lorient	Monaco
20:00 CEST (UTC+2)				Stadium: Stade Louis II; Attendance: 5,410; Referee: Patrick Lhermite

16 January 2002 19	Auxerre	2–2	Lorient	Auxerre
20:30 CEST (UTC+2)				Stadium: Stade de l'Abbé Deschamps; Attendance: 7,495; Referee: Alfons Berg (Germany)
Note: The match was originally scheduled for 22 December 2001, but was postponed due to unsuitable ground.

23 January 2002 22	Lorient	2–0	Rennes	Lorient
20:30 CEST (UTC+2)				Stadium: Stade du Moustoir; Attendance: 12,377; Referee: Thierry Auriac

30 January 2002 23	Paris Saint-Germain	5–0	Lorient	Paris
20:30 CEST (UTC+2)				Stadium: Parc des Princes; Attendance: 37,680; Referee: Dominique Fraise

2 February 2002 24	Bordeaux	2–1	Lorient	Bordeaux
20:00 CEST (UTC+2)				Stadium: Stade Chaban-Delmas; Attendance: 27,278; Referee: Franck Glochon

6 February 2002 25	Lorient	1–0	Montpellier	Lorient
20:30 CEST (UTC+2)	Esceth-N'Zi 88'			Stadium: Stade du Moustoir; Attendance: 9,098; Referee: Gilles Veissière

16 February 2002 26	Lens	1–1	Lorient	Lens
20:00 CEST (UTC+2)	Coridon 10'		Darcheville 45'	Stadium: Stade Félix-Bollaert; Attendance: 36,948; Referee: Éric Poulat

23 February 2002 27	Lorient	1–0	Troyes	Lorient
20:00 CEST (UTC+2)	Feindouno 61'			Stadium: Stade du Moustoir; Attendance: 10,198; Referee: Philippe Kalt

6 March 2002 28	Guingamp	4–3	Lorient	Guingamp
20:30 CEST (UTC+2)				Stadium: Stade Municipal de Roudourou; Attendance: 15,823; Referee: Patrick Lhermite

16 March 2002 29	Lorient	0–0	Bastia	Lorient
20:00 CEST (UTC+2)				Stadium: Stade du Moustoir; Attendance: 10,977; Referee: Hervé Piccirillo

23 March 2002 30	Lyon	2–0	Lorient	Lyon
20:00 CEST (UTC+2)				Stadium: Stade de Gerland; Attendance: 36,221; Referee: Pascal Viléo

6 April 2002 31	Lorient	1–1	Sedan	Lorient
20:00 CEST (UTC+2)				Stadium: Stade du Moustoir; Attendance: 12,830; Referee: Bruno Coué

13 April 2002 32	Nantes	2–0	Lorient	Nantes
20:00 CEST (UTC+2)				Stadium: Stade de la Beaujoire; Attendance: 34,940; Referee: Bruno Derrien

27 April 2002 33	Lorient	2–2	Marseille	Lorient
20:00 CEST (UTC+2)	Darcheville 77' (pen.); Esceth-N'Zi 90'		Fernandão 32'; Sakho 87'	Stadium: Stade du Moustoir; Attendance: 15,896; Referee: Stéphane Moulin

4 May 2002 34	Metz	1–1	Lorient	Metz
20:00 CEST (UTC+2)	Jäger 7'		Darcheville 14'	Stadium: Stade Saint-Symphorien; Attendance: 25,697; Referee: Claude Colombo

=== Coupe de France ===
15 December 2001 Round of 64	SC Douai	1–3 (a.e.t.)	Lorient	Douai
18:00 CET (UTC+1)	Deloffre 8'		Bouzin 44'; Bouard 108'; Eveno 110'	Stadium: Stade Demeny; Attendance: 3,000; Referee: Jean-Marc Rodolphe

19 January 2002 Round of 32	Rennes	1–2	Lorient	Rennes
19:00 CET (UTC+1)	Piquionne 11'		Bedrossian 19'; Darcheville 83'	Stadium: Stade de la Route de Lorient; Attendance: 7,817; Referee: Gilles Veissière

10 February 2002 Round of 16	CS Louhans-Cuiseaux	2–2 (a.e.t.) (5–6 p)	Lorient	Louhans
19:00 CET (UTC+1)	Chapuis 33'; De Carvalho 76'		Kroupi 53', 56'	Stadium: Stade du Bram; Attendance: 6,500; Referee: Bruno Derrien

9 March 2002 Quarter-finals	Paris Saint-Germain	0–1	Lorient	Paris
17:00 CET (UTC+1)			Chabert 32'	Stadium: Parc des Princes; Attendance: 19,794; Referee: Éric Poulat

31 March 2002 Semi-finals	Lorient	1–0	Nîmes	Lorient
18:00 CEST (UTC+2)	Diop 76'			Stadium: Stade du Moustoir; Attendance: 10,280; Referee: Claude Colombo

11 May 2002 Final	Bastia	0–1	Lorient	Saint-Denis
21:05 CEST (UTC+2)			Darcheville 41'	Stadium: Stade de France; Attendance: 66,215; Referee: Éric Poulat

=== Coupe de la Ligue ===
1 December 2001 Round of 32	Lorient	5–4	Metz	Lorient
18:00 CET (UTC+1)	Keïta 23'; Feindouno 30'; Darcheville 59'; Medina 88'; Druon 90+4'		Jäger 25', 40'; Baticle 56'; Sané 90'	Stadium: Stade du Moustoir; Attendance: 6,731; Referee: Philippe Kalt

9 January 2002 Round of 16	Lorient	1–0	Auxerre	Lorient
16:15 CET (UTC+1)	Darcheville 55'			Stadium: Stade du Moustoir; Attendance: 5,339; Referee: Pascal Garibian

27 January 2002 Quarter-finals	Lorient	1–1 (a.e.t.) (4–2 p)	Bastia	Lorient
20:00 CET (UTC+1)	Feindouno 43'		Lambourde 58'	Stadium: Stade du Moustoir; Attendance: 7,617; Referee: Claude Colombo

3 March 2002 Semi-finals	Lorient	1–0	Rennes	Lorient
20:45 CET (UTC+1)	Darcheville 65'			Stadium: Stade du Moustoir; Attendance: 11,638; Referee: Laurent Duhamel

20 April 2002 Final	Lorient	0–3	Bordeaux	Saint-Denis
20:45 CEST (UTC+2)			Pauleta 5', 60'; Meriem 42'	Stadium: Stade de France; Attendance: 75,923; Referee: Alain Sars

== Statistics ==
=== Goalscorers ===
Rank	No.	Pos.	Nat.	Name	Division 1	Coupe de France	Coupe de la Ligue	Total
1	9	FW	(France)	Jean-Claude Darcheville	19	2	3	24
2	14	MF	(Guinea)	Pascal Feindouno	6	0	2	8
3	15	MF	(Ivory Coast)	Tchiressoua Guel	6	0	0	6
4	22	FW	(Ivory Coast)	Élie Kroupi	2	2	0	4
5	25	MF	(France)	Cédric Chabert	1	1	0	2
5	13	MF	(France)	Nicolas Esceth-N'Zi	2	0	0	2
5	2	DF	(France)	Loïc Druon	1	0	1	2
8	8	MF	(Mali)	Seydou Keïta	0	0	1	1
8	27	DF	(Senegal)	Pape Malick Diop	0	1	0	1
8	10	FW	(France)	Pascal Bedrossian	0	1	0	1
8	20	DF	(Argentina)	Hernán Medina	0	0	1	1
8	31	MF	(Algeria)	Moussa Saïb	1	0	0	1
8	3	DF	(France)	Arnaud Le Lan	1	0	0	1
8	26	DF	(France)	Richard Martini	1	0	0	1
8	29	DF	(France)	Yohan Bouzin	0	1	0	1
8	21	MF	(France)	David Bouard	0	1	0	1
8		FW	(France)	Jean-Marie Eveno	0	1	0	1
Totals					43	10	8	61
