= 2002 Coupe de la Ligue final =

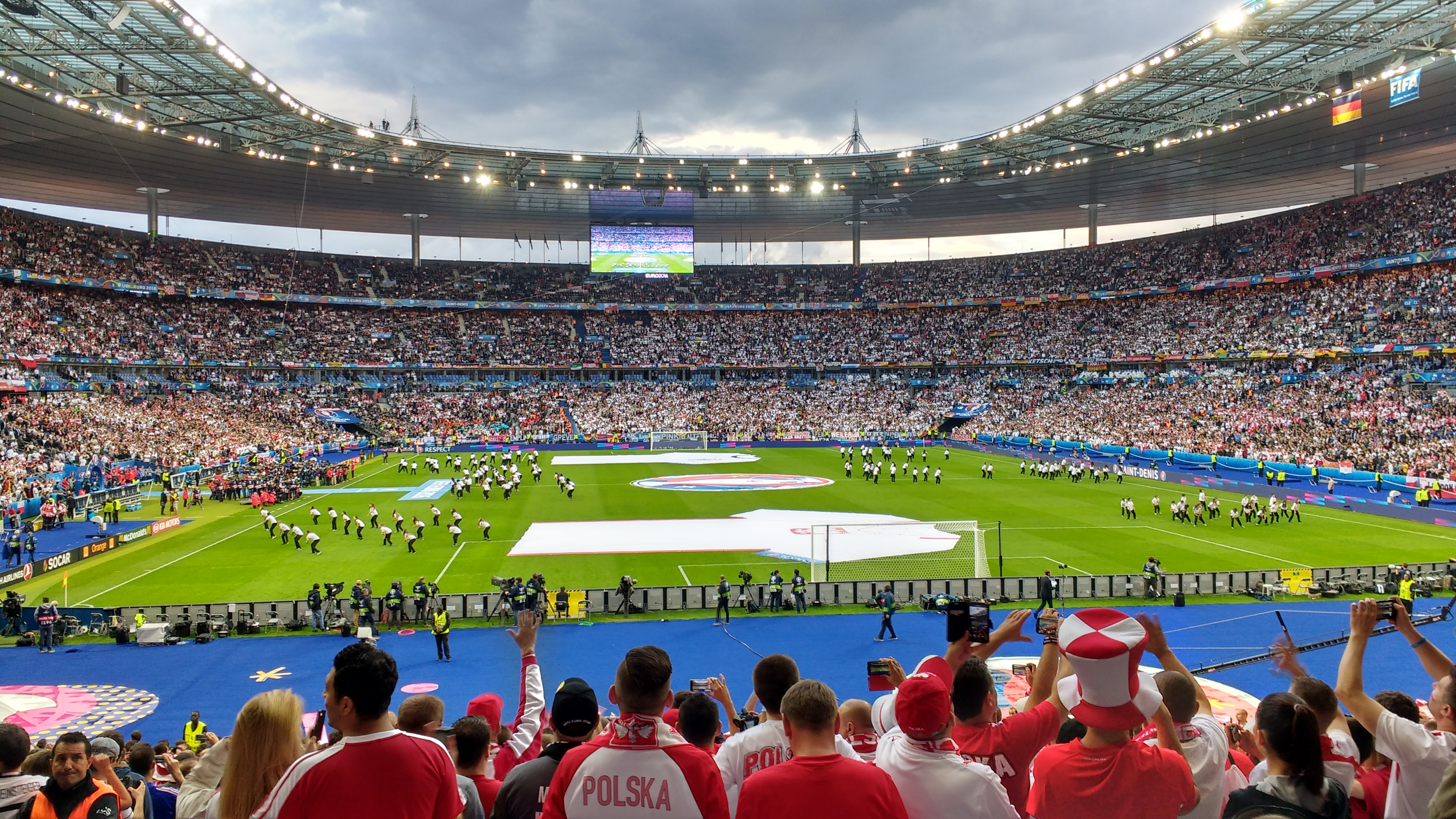
- Event: 2001–02 Coupe de la Ligue
| Bordeaux | Lorient |
| Division 1 | Division 1 |
| 3 | 0 |
- Date: 20 April 2002
- Venue: Stade de France, Saint-Denis
- Referee: Alain Sars
- Attendance: 75,923

The 2002 Coupe de la Ligue final was a football match held at Stade de France, Saint-Denis on 20 April 2002, that saw Bordeaux defeat Lorient 3–0 thanks to two goals by Pauleta and one by Camel Meriem.

== Route to the final ==
Note: In all results below, the score of the finalist is given first (H: home; A: away).

| Bordeaux | | Round | Lorient | |
|---|---|---|---|---|
| Opponent | Result | 2001–02 Coupe de la Ligue | Opponent | Result |
| Cannes (A) | 2–1 | Second round | Metz (H) | 5–4 |
| Lyon (H) | 1–1 (a.e.t.) (4–2 p) | Round of 16 | Auxerre (H) | 1–0 |
| Monaco (H) | 2–1 | Quarter-finals | Bastia (H) | 1–1 (a.e.t.) (4–2 p) |
| Paris Saint-Germain (A) | 1–0 | Semi-finals | Rennes (H) | 1–0 (a.e.t.) |

== Match details ==
20 April 2002
20:45

| Bordeaux | 3–0 | Lorient |
|---|---|---|
| Pauleta 5', 59'; Meriem 42' |

Stade de France, Saint-Denis
Attendance: 75,923
Referee: Alain Sars

FC GIRONDINS DE BORDEAUX:
| GK | 1 | (France) Frédéric Roux |
| DF | 2 | (Tunisia) David Jemmali |
| DF | 4 | (France) Kodjo Afanou |
| DF | 15 | (France) David Sommeil |
| DF | 19 | (Portugal) Bruno Basto |
| MF | 7 | (Brazil) Eduardo Costa |
| MF | 8 | (Russia) Alexei Smertin |
| MF | 10 | (France) Vikash Dhorasoo |
| MF | 27 | (France) Camel Meriem | (substituted off) 86' |
| FW | 21 | (France) Christophe Dugarry (c) |
| FW | 22 | (Portugal) Pauleta | (substituted off) 87' |
Substitutes:
| MF | 23 | (Brazil) Paulo Miranda de Oliveira | (substituted on) 86' |
| FW | 26 | (France) Christophe Sanchez | (substituted on) 87' |
Unused substitutes:
| GK | 16 | (France) Ulrich Ramé |
| DF | 24 | (France) Hervé Alicarte |
| FW | 11 | (Sweden) Yksel Osmanovski |
Manager:
(France) Élie Baup Assistant Referees: Fourth Official:

FC LORIENT:
| GK | 1 | (France) Stéphane Le Garrec |
| DF | 2 | (France) Loïc Druon |
| DF | 29 | (France) Pascal Delhommeau | (substituted off) 63' |
| DF | 5 | (France) Christophe Ferron |
| DF | 27 | (Senegal) Pape Malick Diop |
| DF | 28 | (France) Yohan Bouzin |
| MF | 25 | (France) Cédric Chabert | (substituted off) 46' |
| MF | 19 | (France) Jacques Abardonado (c) |
| MF | 10 | (France) Pascal Bedrossian |
| FW | 9 | (France) Jean-Claude Darcheville | (substituted off) 74' |
| FW | 14 | (Guinea) Pascal Feindouno |
Substitutes:
| MF | 8 | (Mali) Seydou Keita | (substituted on) 46' |
| DF | 26 | (France) Richard Martini | (substituted on) 63' |
| MF | 15 | (Ivory Coast) Tchiressoua Guel | (substituted on) 74' |
Unused substitutes:
| GK | 16 | (France) Sébastien Hamel |
| MF | 31 | (Algeria) Moussa Saïb |
Manager:
(France) Yvon Pouliquen

== See also ==
- 2002 Coupe de France final
- 2001–02 FC Lorient season
