= 2002 Trophée des Champions =

- Event: Trophée des Champions
Lyon	Lorient
5	1
- Date: 27 July 2002
- Venue: Stade Pierre de Coubertin, Cannes, France
- Referee: Bruno Coué
- Attendance: 5,041

The 2002 Trophée des Champions was a football match held at Stade Pierre de Coubertin, Cannes on 27 July 2002, that saw 2001–02 Division 1 champions Olympique Lyonnais defeat 2001–02 Coupe de France winners FC Lorient 5–1.

== Presentation ==
The match refereed by Bruno Coué took place on 27 July 2002 at the Stade Pierre-de-Coubertin in the La Bocca district of Cannes, and was broadcast in France on M6. The Lyonnais won the game with a score of 5–1, thanks to a hat-trick from Sidney Govou, and goals from Vikash Dhorasoo and Peguy Luyindula, the only Lorient goal being the work of Patrice Loko. Olympique Lyonnais thus won its first Champions Trophy.

== Match details ==
27 July 2002
20:45 CET

Lyon	5–1	Lorient
Govou 8', 25', 74'; Dhorasoo 40'; Luyindula 79'	Report	Loko 27'

Stade Pierre de Coubertin, Cannes
Attendance: 5,041
Referee: Bruno Coué

LYON:
GK	1	(France) Grégory Coupet
RB	19	(France) Jean-Marc Chanelet
CB	5	(Brazil) Caçapa
CB	20	(Switzerland) Patrick Müller
LB	13	(France) Jérémie Bréchet
MF	6	(France) Philippe Violeau
MF	8	(Brazil) Juninho	(substituted off) 63'
MF	10	(France) Eric Carrière
MF	24	(France) Vikash Dhorasoo
FW	9	(Brazil) Sonny Anderson (c)	(substituted off) 75'
FW	14	(France) Sidney Govou	(substituted off) 75'
Substitutes:
GK	30	(France) Nicolas Puydebois
DF	4	(France) Florent Laville
MF	7	(Mali) Mahamadou Diarra	(substituted on) 63'
FW	11	(France) Tony Vairelles	(substituted on) 75'
FW	18	(France) Péguy Luyindula	(substituted on) 75'
Manager:
(France) Paul Le Guen

LORIENT:
GK	1	(France) Stéphane Le Garrec
RB	2	(France) Loïc Druon
CB	5	(France) Christophe Ferron
CB	15	(France) Richard Martini
LB	20	(France) Yohan Bouzin	(yellow card) 54'	(substituted off) 59'
MF	6	(France) Sylvain Ripoll
MF	8	(Ivory Coast) Samassi Abou
MF	10	(France) Pascal Bedrossian (c)
MF	27	(Senegal) Pape Malick Diop		(substituted off) 46'
LW	11	(France) Patrice Loko		(substituted off) 63'
FW	22	(France) Élie Kroupi	(yellow card) 34'
Substitutes:
GK	30	(France) Fabien Garnier
DF	3	(France) Marc Boutruche		(substituted on) 59'
DF	4	(France) Anthony Gauvin		(substituted on) 46'
MF	14	(Ivory Coast) Tchiressoua Guel		(substituted on) 63'
FW	7	(France) Nicolas Esceth-N'Zi
Manager:
(France) Yvon Pouliquen

MATCH OFFICIALS

- Assistant referees:
  - Jacques Clavet
  - Jean-Philippe Izzo
- Fourth official: Claude Medam

== See also ==
- 2002–03 Ligue 1
- 2002–03 Coupe de France
- 2002–03 Olympique Lyonnais season
