= 2001–02 En Avant de Guingamp season =

En Avant de Guingamp
2001–02 season
- President: Alain Aubert
- Head coach: Guy Lacombe
- Stadium: Stade de Roudourou
- French Division 1: 16th
- Coupe de France: Round of 32
- Coupe de la Ligue: Round of 16
- Average home league attendance: 12,206
- Biggest win: Metz 2–4 Guingamp
- Biggest defeat: Lorient 6–2 Guingamp

The 2001–02 season was the 90th season in the history of En Avant de Guingamp and the club's second consecutive season in the top flight of French football. In addition to the domestic league, Guingamp participated in this season's editions of the Coupe de France and the Coupe de la Ligue.

== Pre-season and friendlies ==
Win Draw Loss

10 July 2001 Friendly	Lens (France)	0–1	(France) Guingamp	Saint-Malo
18:00

18 July 2001 Friendly	Guingamp (France)	3–3 (4–5 p)	(France) Marseille	Lorient
				Stadium: Stade du Moustoir

== Competitions ==
=== Overall record ===
Competition	First match	Last match	Starting round	Final position	Record							
Competition	First match	Last match	Starting round	Final position	Pld	W	D	L	GF	GA	GD	Win %
French Division 1	28 July 2001	4 May 2002	Matchday 1	16th	34	9	8	17	34	57	−23	26.47
Coupe de France	14 December 2001	January 2002	Round of 64	Round of 32	2	0	1	1	2	4	−2	0.00
Coupe de la Ligue	December 2001	8 January 2002	Round of 32	Round of 16	2	1	0	1	5	3	+2	50.00
Total					38	10	9	19	41	64	−23	26.32

Source: Competitions

=== French Division 1 ===
==== League table ====
Pos	Team	Pld	W	D	L	GF	GA	GD	Pts	Qualification or relegation
14	Sedan	34	8	15	11	35	39	−4	39	
15	Monaco	34	9	12	13	36	41	−5	39	
16	Guingamp	34	9	8	17	34	57	−23	35	
17	Metz (R)	34	9	6	19	31	47	−16	33	Relegation to Ligue 2
18	Lorient (R)	34	7	10	17	43	64	−21	31	UEFA Cup first round and relegated to Ligue 2 (Note: Lorient was qualified for the 2002–03 UEFA Cup as winners of the 2001–02 Coupe de France.)

Source: Ligue 1
Rules for classification: 1) points; 2) goal difference; 3) number of goals scored.
(R) Relegated

==== Results summary ====
Overall								Home						Away					
Pld	W	D	L	GF	GA	GD	Pts	W	D	L	GF	GA	GD	W	D	L	GF	GA	GD
34	9	8	17	34	57	−23	35	8	5	4	19	17	+2	1	3	13	15	40	−25

Source: French Division 1

==== Results by round ====
Round	1	2	3	4	5	6	7	8	9	10	11	12	13	14	15	16	17	18	19	20	21	22	23	24	25	26	27	28	29	30	31	32	33	34
Ground	A	H	A	A	H	A	H	A	H	A	H	A	H	A	H	A	H	A	H	H	A	H	A	H	A	H	A	H	A	H	A	H	A	H
Result	L	W	D	L	W	L	L	D	W	L	W	L	D	D	D	L	W	L	L	L	L	D	W	D	L	D	L	W	L	L	L	W	L	W
Position	17	10	10	13	10	11	14	15	11	12	9	12	12	12	11	14	11	13	15	15	16	15	14	15	16	16	17	16	16	16	18	17	17	16

Source: French Division 1
A = Away; H = Home; W = Win; D = Draw; L = Loss

==== Matches ====
28 July 2001 1	Troyes	3–0	Guingamp

4 August 2001 2	Guingamp	1–0	Bastia

12 August 2001 3	Sedan	1–1	Guingamp

18 August 2001 4	Lyon	3–0	Guingamp

25 August 2001 5	Guingamp	1–0	Nantes

8 September 2001 6	Lille	1–0	Guingamp

15 September 2001 7	Guingamp	0–2	Metz

22 September 2001 8	Auxerre	2–2	Guingamp

29 September 2001 9	Guingamp	1–0	Marseille

13 October 2001 10	Rennes	2–1	Guingamp

20 October 2001 11	Guingamp	2–1	Monaco

27 October 2001 12	Lorient	6–2	Guingamp

3 November 2001 13	Guingamp	0–0	Sochaux

17 November 2001 14	Paris Saint-Germain	1–1	Guingamp

24 November 2001 15	Guingamp	2–2	Montpellier

28 November 2001 16	Bordeaux	2–0	Guingamp

8 December 2001 17	Guingamp	1–0	Lens

19 December 2001 18	Bastia	3–0	Guingamp

22 December 2001 19	Guingamp	1–2	Sedan

5 January 2002 20	Guingamp	2–4	Lyon

12 January 2002 21	Nantes	2–0	Guingamp

23 January 2002 22	Guingamp	0–0	Lille

30 January 2002 23	Metz	2–4	Guingamp

2 February 2002 24	Guingamp	0–0	Auxerre

6 February 2002 25	Marseille	2–1	Guingamp

16 February 2002 26	Guingamp	1–1	Rennes

23 February 2002 27	Monaco	3–1	Guingamp

6 March 2002 28	Guingamp	4–3	Lorient

16 March 2002 29	Sochaux	1–0	Guingamp

23 March 2002 30	Guingamp	0–1	Paris Saint-Germain

6 April 2002 31	Montpellier	2–1	Guingamp

13 April 2002 32	Guingamp	2–1	Bordeaux

27 April 2002 33	Lens	4–1	Guingamp

4 May 2002 34	Guingamp	1–0	Troyes

=== Coupe de France ===
15 December 2001 Round of 64	Tours	2–2 (a.e.t.) (1–4 p)	Guingamp	Tours
20:00				Stadium: Stade de la Vallée du Cher; Attendance: 8,200; Referee: Stéphane Lannoy

19 January 2002 Round of 32	CS Louhans-Cuiseaux	2–0	Guingamp	Louhans
20:00				Stadium: Stade du Bram; Attendance: 2,331; Referee: Dominique Fraise
