= Pascal Feindouno =

Guinean footballer (born 1981)

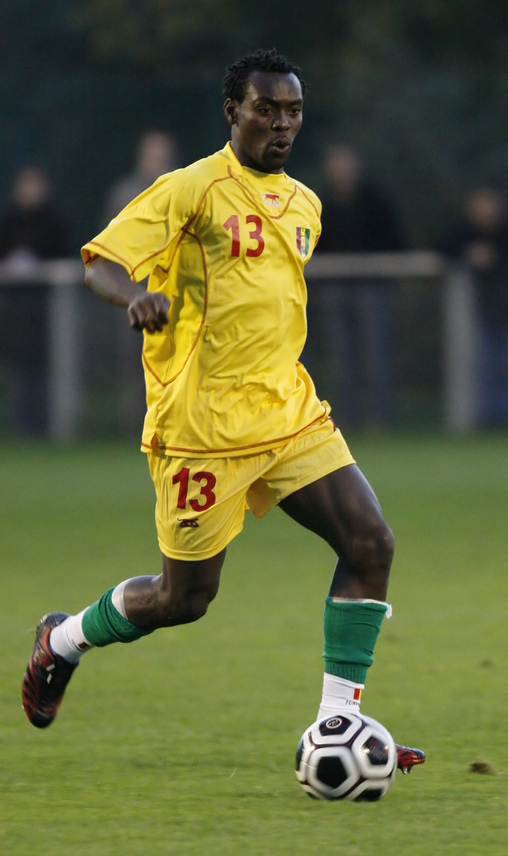
- Feindouno with Guinea in 2006

Personal information
- Date of birth: 27 February 1981 (age 45)
- Place of birth: Conakry, Guinea
- Height: 1.76 m (5 ft 9 in)
- Positions: Winger; attacking midfielder

Senior career*
| Years | Team | Apps | (Gls) |
| 1996–1997 | CI Kamsar | | |
| 1998–2004 | Bordeaux | 94 | (10) |
| 2001–2002 | → Lorient (loan) | 30 | (6) |
| 2004–2008 | Saint-Étienne | 138 | (34) |
| 2008–2010 | Al Sadd | 24 | (11) |
| 2009–2010 | → Al-Rayyan (loan) | 14 | (5) |
| 2010 | → Al-Nassr (loan) | 5 | (2) |
| 2011 | Monaco | 5 | (0) |
| 2011 | Sion | 9 | (3) |
| 2012–2013 | Elazığspor | 10 | (1) |
| 2013 | AS Kaloum | | |
| 2013–2014 | Lausanne-Sport | 17 | (4) |
| 2015–2016 | Hassania Agadir | 0 | (0) |
| 2015–2016 | Sedan | 0 | (0) |
| 2016 | FK Atlantas | 3 | (0) |

International career
| 1998–2012 | Guinea | 85 | (30) |
- * Club domestic league appearances and goals

Pascal Feindouno (born 27 February 1981) is a Guinean former professional footballer who played as a winger. He scored 30 goals in 85 appearances between 1998 and 2012 for the Guinea national team.

== Club career ==
=== Early career ===
Born in Conakry, Feindouno began his career with Club Industriel de Kamsar where played for two years before signing with Hirondelles de Conakry in January 1998.

=== Bordeaux, and Lorient loan ===
Feindouno started his European career at FC Girondins de Bordeaux in July 1998, and scored the goal which gave the club the Ligue 1 Championship title in 1999. He spent the 2001–02 season on loan at Lorient. Whilst at Lorient Feindouno played in the 2002 Coupe de France Final in which they beat SC Bastia.

=== Saint-Étienne ===
Feindouno left Bordeaux to join Saint-Étienne before the 2004–05 season. He missed Guinea's lost quarter final against the Ivory Coast in the 2008 African Nations due to suspension.

In summer 2007 he was linked with a move away from his club, with many sides from all over Europe interested in his services. Feindouno stated his desire to link up with close friend and former Lorient teammate Jean-Claude Darcheville at Scottish side Rangers in May 2007 or in the January transfer window of 2008. On 12 October 2007, it was reported that Premiership club Liverpool's manager Rafael Benítez was to make a bid to sign him in the January transfer window.

=== Qatar and Saudi Arabia ===
On 24 September 2008, Feindouno moved to Al Sadd SC of the Qatar National First Division for €7 million, signing a contract for four years. After one year at Al Sadd, he was transferred to Al Rayyan Sports Club on a one-year loan. On 29 January 2010, he moved to Al-Nassr on a three-month loan.

In the summer 2010 transfer window, he reportedly attracted interest from Everton, Blackburn Rovers and Bolton Wanderers but nothing came of it. Celtic were reported to have offered him a contract worth £10,000 a week on 11 December 2010.

=== Later career ===
In February 2011, he confirmed that he had signed for Monaco after trials with Celtic and Wigan Athletic.

He left Monaco after their relegation and on 22 June joined Swiss Super League outfit FC Sion, but left in January 2012 after the Swiss Football Association deducted 36 points for fielding ineligible players.

In July 2012, he signed for the Turkish club Elazığspor and his contract was terminated in February 2013, before the end of the 2012–13 season. In April 2013, he returned to Guinea, signing a four-month contract with AS Kaloum Star.

On 30 August 2013, Swiss Super League team Lausanne-Sport announced that Feindouno had agreed to a short-term deal until Christmas Day, with an option to extend for a further year.

In September 2014, Feindouno signed a one-year contract with Moroccan club Hassania Agadir. In February 2015, he agreed the termination of his contract.

On 17 November 2015, Feindouno joined CS Sedan Ardennes, along with his stepson Abdoul Karim Sylla. On 2 December, it was reported that the club's doctor had refused to grant him permission to play football after cardiac tests had shown "abnormalities" in the size of an artery. Two days later, he was linked with a move to Congolese side TP Mazembe.

In May 2016, he moved to Lithuanian side FK Atlantas, again with Abdoul Karim Sylla.

== International career ==
Feindouno was a member of the Guinea national team squad that participated in the 2004 Africa Cup of Nations. Guinea recorded one win and two draws in the group stage, finishing second in their group to qualify for the quarter-finals. However, they were eliminated after losing 2–1 to the Mali.

At the 2006 Africa Cup of Nations in Egypt, Feindouno again represented Guinea and attracted attention by scoring four goals. On 26 January 2006, he scored twice in a group-stage match against the Zambia, leading Guinea to a 2–1 victory. Guinea advanced to the quarter-finals but lost 3–2 to the Senegal on 3 February. Feindouno finished the tournament with four goals, ranking joint second in the scoring charts behind Samuel Eto'o.

He also participated in the 2008 Africa Cup of Nations in Ghana. Although Guinea lost to the host nation, the Ghana, in the group stage, they strengthened their chances of reaching the quarter-finals with a 3–2 victory over the Morocco on 24 January. Feindouno scored twice in the match, finding the net in the 11th minute and the 63rd minute, but was sent off in the 67th minute. Guinea advanced from the group stage but were eliminated in the quarter-finals after suffering a 5–0 defeat to the Ivory Coast.

Feindouno also participated in the 2012 Africa Cup of Nations, co-hosted by Gabon and Equatorial Guinea. He started in Guinea's opening group-stage match against the Mali and provided an assist for Abdoul Camara in a 6–1 victory over the Botswana on 28 January. He also featured in the final group-stage match against the Ghana national team, but Guinea finished third in their group and were eliminated.

== Personal life ==
Feindouno acquired French nationality by naturalization on 21 October 2004.

Pascal Feindouno's brother is midfielder Simon Feindouno. His other brother Benjamin Feindouno also played football but was found dead at his home in August 2025. His stepson Abdoul Karim Sylla is a footballer as well.

== Career statistics ==
=== Club ===
Appearances and goals by club, season and competition
| Club | Season | League | | | National cup | | League cup | | Continental | | Total | | Ref. |
| Club | Season | Division | Apps | Goals | Apps | Goals | Apps | Goals | Apps | Goals | Apps | Goals | Ref. |
|---|---|---|---|---|---|---|---|---|---|---|---|---|---|
| Bordeaux | 1998–99 | Ligue 1 | 3 | 1 | | | | | | | 3 | 1 | |
| Bordeaux | 1999–00 | Ligue 1 | 11 | 0 | | | | | 5 | 1 | 16 | 1 | |
| Bordeaux | 2000–01 | Ligue 1 | 14 | 1 | 2 | 0 | 1 | 0 | 4 | 2 | 21 | 3 | |
| Bordeaux | 2002–03 | Ligue 1 | 35 | 4 | 5 | 2 | 2 | 0 | 6 | 5 | 48 | 11 | |
| Bordeaux | 2003–04 | Ligue 1 | 31 | 4 | 1 | 0 | 2 | 0 | 9 | 1 | 43 | 5 | |
| Bordeaux | Total | | 94 | 10 | 8 | 2 | 5 | 0 | 24 | 9 | 131 | 21 | – |
| Lorient (loan) | 2001–02 | Ligue 1 | 30 | 6 | 4 | 0 | 5 | 2 | 0 | 0 | 39 | 8 | |
| Saint-Étienne | 2004–05 | Ligue 1 | 36 | 13 | 1 | 0 | 3 | 1 | 0 | 0 | 40 | 14 | |
| Saint-Étienne | 2005–06 | Ligue 1 | 28 | 3 | 1 | 0 | 0 | 0 | 4 | 1 | 33 | 4 | |
| Saint-Étienne | 2006–07 | Ligue 1 | 36 | 9 | 0 | 0 | 1 | 0 | 0 | 0 | 37 | 9 | |
| Saint-Étienne | 2007–08 | Ligue 1 | 33 | 8 | 0 | 0 | 1 | 0 | 0 | 0 | 34 | 8 | |
| Saint-Étienne | 2008–09 | Ligue 1 | 5 | 1 | 0 | 0 | 0 | 0 | 0 | 0 | 5 | 1 | |
| Saint-Étienne | Total | | 138 | 34 | 2 | 0 | 5 | 1 | 4 | 1 | 149 | 36 | – |
| Al Sadd | 2008–09 | Qatar Stars League | 24 | 11 | | | | | | | 24 | 11 | |
| Al-Rayyan | 2009–10 | Qatar Stars League | 14 | 5 | | | | | | | 14 | 5 | |
| Al-Nassr | 2009–10 | Saudi Professional League | 5 | 2 | | | | | | | 5 | 2 | |
| Monaco | 2010–11 | Ligue 1 | 5 | 0 | 0 | 0 | 0 | 0 | 0 | 0 | 5 | 0 | |
| Sion | 2011–12 | Swiss Super League | 9 | 3 | 1 | 1 | – | | 2 | 2 | 12 | 6 | |
| Elazığspor | 2012–13 | Süper Lig | 10 | 1 | 1 | 1 | – | | 0 | 0 | 11 | 2 | |
| Lausanne-Sport | 2013–14 | Swiss Super League | 17 | 4 | | | – | | 0 | 0 | 17 | 4 | |
| Atlantas | 2016 | A Lyga | 3 | 0 | | | – | | 0 | 0 | 3 | 0 | |
| Career total | | | 349 | 76 | 16 | 4 | 15 | 3 | 30 | 12 | 410 | 95 | – |

=== International ===
Scores and results list Guinea's goal tally first, score column indicates score after each Feindouno goal.

List of international goals scored by Pascal Feindouno
| No. | Date | Venue | Opponent | Score | Result | Competition |
|---|---|---|---|---|---|---|
| 1 | 8 April 2000 | Nakivubo Stadium, Kampala, Uganda | Uganda | 4–3 | 4–4 | 2002 FIFA World Cup qualification |
| 2 | 23 April 2000 | Stade du 28 Septembre, Conakry, Guinea | Uganda | 2–0 | 3–0 | 2002 FIFA World Cup qualification |
| 3 | 23 April 2000 | Stade du 28 Septembre, Conakry, Guinea | Uganda | 3–0 | 3–0 | 2002 FIFA World Cup qualification |
| 4 | 14 May 2000 | Estádio da Várzea, Praia, Cape Verde | Mali | 2–0 | 2–0 | 2000 Amílcar Cabral Cup |
| 5 | 9 July 2000 | Stade du 4 Août, Ouagadougou, Burkina Faso | Burkina Faso | 3–2 | 3–2 (a) | 2002 FIFA World Cup qualification |
| 6 | 2 September 2000 | Nakivubo Stadium, Kampala, Uganda | Uganda | 1–2 | 1–3 (a) | 2002 Africa Cup of Nations qualification |
| 7 | 6 July 2003 | Stade du 28 Septembre, Conakry, Guinea | Ethiopia | 2–0 | 4–0 | 2004 Africa Cup of Nations qualification |
| 8 | 25 January 2004 | Stade El Menzah, Tunis, Tunisia | DR Congo | 2–1 | 2–1 | 2004 Africa Cup of Nations |
| 9 | 7 February 2004 | Stade El Menzah, Tunis, Tunisia | Mali | 1–0 | 1–2 | 2004 Africa Cup of Nations |
| 10 | 28 April 2004 | Aix-les-Bains, France | Ivory Coast | 1–1 | 2–4 | Friendly |
| 11 | 5 September 2004 | Stade du 28 Septembre, Conakry, Guinea | Botswana | 1–0 | 4–0 | 2006 FIFA World Cup qualification |
| 12 | 17 November 2004 | Nyayo National Stadium, Nairobi, Kenya | Kenya | 1–1 | 1–2 | 2006 FIFA World Cup qualification |
| 13 | 9 February 2004 | Stade de France, Paris, France | Mali | 2–2 | 2–2 | Friendly |
| 14 | 4 September 2005 | Stade du 28 Septembre, Conakry, Guinea | Malawi | 1–0 | 3–1 | 2006 FIFA World Cup qualification |
| 15 | 26 January 2006 | Haras El Hodoud Stadium, Alexandria, Egypt | Zambia | 1–1 | 2–1 | 2006 Africa Cup of Nations |
| 16 | 26 January 2006 | Haras El Hodoud Stadium, Alexandria, Egypt | Zambia | 2–1 | 2–1 | 2006 Africa Cup of Nations |
| 17 | 30 January 2006 | Haras El Hodoud Stadium, Alexandria, Egypt | Tunisia | 2–0 | 3–0 | 2006 Africa Cup of Nations |
| 18 | 3 February 2006 | Haras El Hodoud Stadium, Alexandria, Egypt | Senegal | 2–3 | 2–3 | 2006 Africa Cup of Nations |
| 19 | 24 March 2007 | Independence Stadium, Bakau, Gambia | Gambia | 2–0 | 2–0 | 2008 Africa Cup of Nations qualification |
| 20 | 16 June 2007 | July 5, 1962 Stadium, Algiers, Algeria | Algeria | 2–0 | 2–0 | 2008 Africa Cup of Nations qualification |
| 21 | 9 September 2007 | Stade du 28 Septembre, Conakry, Guinea | Cape Verde | 1–0 | 4–0 | 2008 Africa Cup of Nations qualification |
| 22 | 24 January 2008 | Ohene Djan Stadium, Accra, Ghana | Morocco | 1–0 | 3–2 | 2008 Africa Cup of Nations |
| 23 | 24 January 2008 | Ohene Djan Stadium, Accra, Ghana | Morocco | 3–1 | 3–2 | 2008 Africa Cup of Nations |
| 24 | 14 June 2008 | Sam Nujoma Stadium, Windhoek, Namibia | Namibia | 2–1 | 2–1 | 2010 FIFA World Cup qualification |
| 25 | 22 June 2008 | Stade du 28 Septembre, Conakry, Guinea | Namibia | 1–0 | 4–0 | 2010 FIFA World Cup qualification |
| 26 | 11 February 2009 | Stade Robert Bobin, Bondoufle, France | Cameroon | 1–2 | 1–3 | Friendly |
| 27 | 28 March 2009 | Stade du 4 Août, Ouagadougou, Burkina Faso | Burkina Faso | 1–3 | 2–4 | 2010 FIFA World Cup qualification |
| 28 | 21 June 2009 | Stade du 28 Septembre, Conakry, Guinea | Malawi | 1–0 | 2–1 | 2010 FIFA World Cup qualification |
| 29 | 21 June 2009 | Stade du 28 Septembre, Conakry, Guinea | Malawi | 2–0 | 2–1 | 2010 FIFA World Cup qualification |
| 30 | 11 November 2011 | Stade Aimé Bergeal, Paris, France | Senegal | 1–4 | 1–4 | Friendly |

- (a): Match annulled after Guinea were banned from FIFA competitions due to governmental interference

== Honours ==
Bordeaux

- Ligue 1: 1998–99

Lorient

- Coupe de France: 2001–02
- Coupe de la Ligue runner-up: 2001–02
