= Stéphane Le Garrec =

French footballer (born 1969)

Personal information
- Date of birth: 7 April 1969 (age 57)
- Place of birth: Puteaux, France
- Height: 1.83 m (6 ft 0 in)
- Position: Goalkeeper

Team information
- Current team: Pontivy (manager)

Youth career
- US Montagnarde
- Lorient

Senior career*
Years	Team	Apps	(Gls)
1986–1990	Lorient		
1990–1993	Guingamp	97	(0)
1993–1995	Valenciennes		
1995–1996	Rennes	0	(0)
1996–1998	Laval	1	(0)
1998–2005	Lorient	141	(0)
2006–2007	Lorient B		
Total		312+	(0+)

International career
1988	Brittany	1	(0)

Managerial career
- 2005–2018: Lorient B (assistant)
- 2019–: Pontivy
- * Club domestic league appearances and goals

Stéphane Le Garrec (born 7 April 1969) is a French professional football manager and former player who is the head coach of Championnat National 3 club Pontivy. As a player, he was a goalkeeper, and most notably played for Lorient, where he made over 180 league appearances.

== Honours ==
Lorient

- Coupe de France: 2001–02
- Coupe de la Ligue runner-up: 2001–02
