= Richard Martini =

Richard Martini may refer to:

- Richard Martini (director) (born 1955), American film director
- Richard Martini (footballer) (born 1978), French footballer
- Rich Martini, American football player
