= Nicolas Esceth-N'Zi =

Footballer (born 1977)

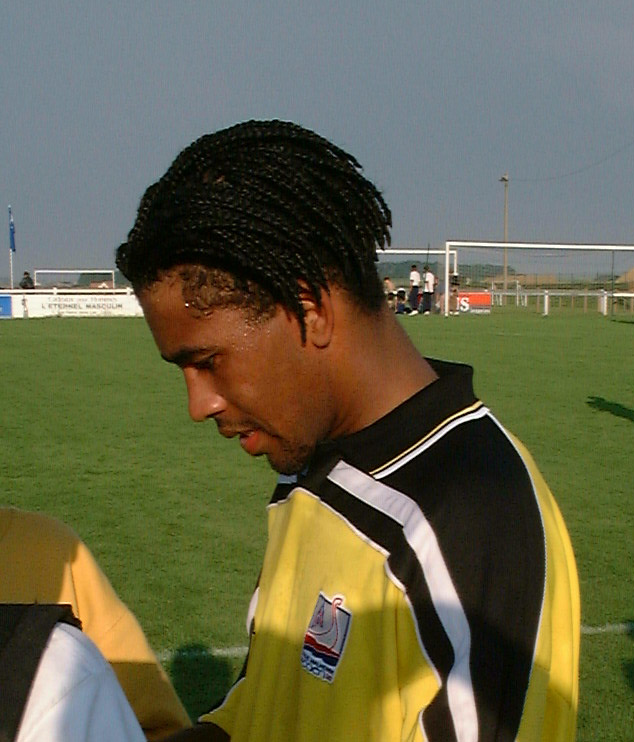
- Esceth-N'Zi with Caen in 2000

Personal information
- Date of birth: 24 June 1977 (age 49)
- Place of birth: Amboise, France
- Height: 1.75 m (5 ft 9 in)
- Position: Midfielder

Youth career
- 1983–1991: Orléans
- 1991–1994: Bourges
- 1994–1995: Gueugnon

Senior career*
Years	Team	Apps	(Gls)
1995–2000	Gueugnon	90	(7)
2000–2001	Caen	20	(2)
2001–2003	Lorient	31	(3)
2003–2004	Lorient B		
2004–2005	Montpellier	7	(0)
2005–2006	Montpellier B		
2006–2007	Dubai CSC		
2007–2009	Stade Raphaëlois		
2009–2010	Draguignan		
Total		148+	(12+)

International career
2002	Ivory Coast	1	(0)
- * Club domestic league appearances and goals

Nicolas Esceth-N'Zi (born 24 June 1977) is a former professional footballer who played as a midfielder. Born in France, he played one match for the Ivory Coast national team.

== International career ==
On 8 September 2002, Esceth-N'Zi made his international debut for the Ivory Coast national team in a 0–0 draw to South Africa in African Cup of Nations qualification.

== Honours ==
Gueugnon

- Coupe de la Ligue: 1999–2000

Lorient

- Coupe de France: 2001–02
- Coupe de la Ligue runner-up: 2001–02
