= Moussa Guel =

Ivorian footballer (born 1999)

Personal information
- Date of birth: 23 June 1999 (age 27)
- Place of birth: Cocody, Ivory Coast
- Height: 1.70 m (5 ft 7 in)
- Position: Forward

Team information
- Current team: Tikvesh
- Number: 22

Youth career
- 2009–2017: Lorient

Senior career*
Years	Team	Apps	(Gls)
2016–2019	Lorient II	53	(7)
2017–2020	Lorient	7	(0)
2019–2020	→ Quevilly-Rouen (loan)	24	(4)
2020–2022	Valenciennes	20	(1)
2021–2022	→ Red Star (loan)	30	(3)
2022–2023	Red Star	14	(1)
2023–2025	Samsunspor	2	(0)
2023–2024	→ Dunkerque (loan)	8	(0)
2025	Paris 13 Atletico	15	(2)
2025–2026	Bourg-Péronnas	15	(0)
2026–	Tikvesh	15	(1)
- * Club domestic league appearances and goals as of 18 June 2026

Moussa Yann Cedric Guel (born 23 June 1999) is an Ivorian professional footballer who plays as a forward for Macedonian First Football League club Tikvesh.

== Career ==
Guel started playing at the age of five, but formally joined FC Lorient in 2009, at ten years of age. He made his professional debut for Lorient in a 2–1 Ligue 2 win over FC Sochaux-Montbéliard on 8 December 2017.

After playing for Red Star on loan in the 2021–22 season, on 6 July 2022 Guel rejoined the club on a permanent basis.

He signed a 2.5-year contract with Samsunspor in January 2023.

== Personal life ==
Moussa Guel holds both French and Ivorian nationalities. His father, Tchiressoua Guel, was also a professional footballer and represented the Ivory Coast national team.
