= Jérémie Bréchet =

French association football player (born 1979)

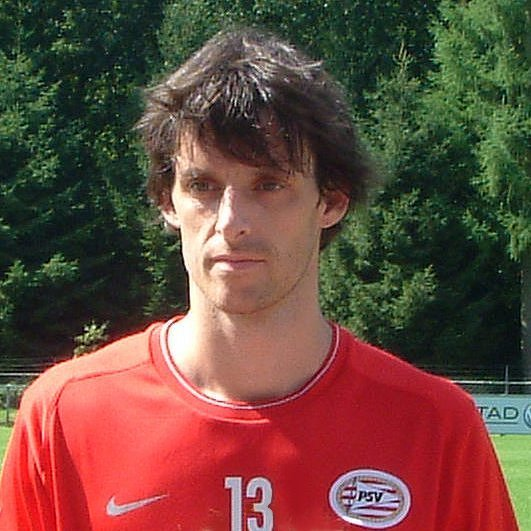
- Bréchet with PSV in 2008

Personal information
- Full name: Jérémie Pierre Bréchet
- Date of birth: 14 August 1979 (age 47)
- Place of birth: Lyon, Rhône-Alpes, France
- Height: 1.86 m (6 ft 1 in)
- Positions: Left-back; left midfielder

Team information
- Current team: Lille (assistant coach)

Youth career
- 1996–1998: Lyon

Senior career*
Years	Team	Apps	(Gls)
1998–2003	Lyon	117	(0)
2003–2004	Inter Milan	9	(0)
2004–2006	Real Sociedad	20	(0)
2006–2008	Sochaux	51	(2)
2008–2009	PSV	27	(1)
2009–2012	Sochaux	58	(2)
2012–2013	Troyes	24	(2)
2013–2014	Bordeaux	4	(0)
2014–2018	Gazélec Ajaccio	112	(4)
Total		422	(9)

International career
2001–2003	France	3	(0)

Managerial career
- 2023–2024: Lyon (assistant)
- 2024–: Lille (assistant)
Medal record
Men's football
Representing France
FIFA Confederations Cup
Winner	2001 Korea/Japan
UEFA European Under-21 Championship
Runner-up	2002 Switzerland
- * Club domestic league appearances and goals

Jérémie Pierre Bréchet (French: [ʒeʁemi bʁeʃɛ]; born 14 August 1979) is a French professional football coach and former player who is the assistant head coach of Ligue 1 club Lille. He was usually used as a left-back but could play as a centre-back. Because of his technical skills he could also play in midfield.

He was capped three times for the French national side.

== Playing career ==
=== Lyon ===
Born in Lyon, Rhône-Alpes, France, Jérémie Bréchet started his career at local club Olympique Lyonnais. He made his debut in the professional football during the 1998–99 season. In that season he played 15 times. Bréchet played in Lyon until 2003, amassing a total of 116 games for the club and winning the Ligue 1 championship in the 2001–02 and the 2002–03 seasons. In July 2003, Bréchet was transferred to Inter Milan.

=== Inter Milan ===
The 2003–04 season started well for Inter, but after six average games, manager Héctor Cúper was fired from Inter and Corrado Verdelli took over. Following the new manager appointment and having sustained an injury, Bréchet was featured for only a few more games. In total, Bréchet played nine games for Inter. Inter informed him that he could leave the club. In 2004, Bréchet signed a contract with Real Sociedad.

=== Real Sociedad ===
Bréchet played for Real Sociedad in the La Liga for two seasons. As Bréchet was injured seriously, he managed only 20 appearances for the club.

=== Sochaux ===
At the ambitious FC Sochaux, Bréchet made an impressive start on the pitch. After three games, he was appointed captain of the squad. At "Les Lionceaux", he had two strong seasons and became a key player for the team staying injury-free. During his captaincy Sochaux managed to win the Coupe de France twice. In June 2008, Bréchet left the club and moved to PSV.

=== PSV ===
In the 2008–09 season, Bréchet signed for Dutch club PSV on a three-year contract.

=== Return to Sochaux ===
On 22 June 2009, Bréchet agreed a move back to FC Sochaux, insisting his decision was because of his family. Following the end of the 2011–12 season, Bréchet became a free agent as his contract was not extended.

=== Troyes ===
On 9 August 2012, he signed a one-year contract with newly promoted Ligue 1 side Troyes AC.

=== Bordeaux ===
In June 2013, Bréchet joined Bordeaux on a one-year deal.

=== Gazélec Ajaccio ===
After one year with Bordeaux, Bréchet signed for a Ligue 2 team for the first time in his career, joining Gazélec Ajaccio on a one-year deal.

== Managerial career ==
After his retirement, Bréchet worked as a manager in the youth teams of his former club Lyon. In December 2023, he joined Lyon's first team staff and was named as the assistant manager for Pierre Sage.

== Career statistics ==
Appearances and goals by club, season and competition
Club	Season	League			Cup (Note: Includes Coupe de France, Coupe de la Ligue, Coppa Italia and Dutch Supercup.)		Continental (Note: Includes UEFA Champions League and UEFA Cup.)		Total	
Club	Season	Division	Apps	Goals	Apps	Goals	Apps	Goals	Apps	Goals
Lyon	1998–99	Division 1	15	0	2	0	1	0	18	0
Lyon	1999–00	Division 1	16	0	1	0	4	0	21	0
Lyon	2000–01	Division 1	27	0	8	0	14	0	49	0
Lyon	2001–02	Division 1	28	0	4	0	8	0	40	0
Lyon	2002–03	Ligue 1	31	0	3	0	7	0	41	0
Lyon	Total		117	0	18	0	34	0	169	0
Inter Milan	2003–04	Serie A	9	0	2	0	3	0	14	0
Real Sociedad	2004–05	Primera	17	0	–		–		17	0
Real Sociedad	2005–06	Primera	3	0	–		–		3	0
Real Sociedad	Total		20	0	0	0	0	0	20	0
Sochaux	2006–07	Ligue 1	30	0	5	0	–		35	0
Sochaux	2007–08	Ligue 1	21	2	3	0	–		24	2
Sochaux	Total		51	2	8	0	0	0	59	2
PSV	2008–09	Eredivisie	27	1	1	0	5	0	33	1
Sochaux	2009–10	Ligue 1	33	2	3	0	–		36	2
Sochaux	2010–11	Ligue 1	20	0	3	0	–		23	0
Sochaux	2011–12	Ligue 1	5	0	1	0	–		6	0
Sochaux	Total		58	2	7	0	0	0	65	2
Troyes	2012–13	Ligue 1	24	2	4	1	–		28	3
Bordeaux	2013–14	Ligue 1	4	0	1	0	5	0	10	0
Ajaccio	2014–15	Ligue 2	28	2	–		–		28	2
Ajaccio	2015–16	Ligue 1	23	0	4	0	–		27	0
Ajaccio	2016–17	Ligue 2	30	0	1	0	–		31	0
Ajaccio	2017–18	Ligue 2	31	2	1	0	–		32	2
Ajaccio	Total		112	4	6	0	0	0	118	4
Career total			422	9	47	1	47	0	516	10

== Honours ==
Lyon

- Division/Ligue 1: 2001–02, 2002–03
- Coupe de la Ligue: 2000–01
- Trophée des Champions: 2002

Sochaux

- Coupe de France: 2006–07

PSV

- Johan Cruyff Shield: 2008

France

- FIFA Confederations Cup: 2001
