= Cédric Chabert =

French footballer (born 1973)

Personal information
- Date of birth: 3 December 1973 (age 52)
- Place of birth: La Voulte-sur-Rhône, France
- Height: 1.80 m (5 ft 11 in)
- Position: Midfielder

Senior career*
Years	Team	Apps	(Gls)
1994–1999	Valence	136	(11)
1999–2000	Gueugnon	28	(1)
2000–2001	Le Mans	33	(2)
2001–2004	Lorient	66	(4)
2004–2005	Amiens	17	(0)
2006–2007	Pont-de-Chéruy		
Total		280+	(18+)
- * Club domestic league appearances and goals

Cédric Chabert (born 3 December 1973) is a French former professional footballer who played as a midfielder.

== Honours ==
Gueugnon

- Coupe de la Ligue: 1999–2000

Lorient

- Coupe de France: 2001–02
- Coupe de la Ligue runner-up: 2001–02
