= Yohan Bouzin =

French footballer (born 1974)

Personal information
- Date of birth: 20 August 1974 (age 52)
- Place of birth: Boulogne-sur-Mer, France
- Height: 1.80 m (5 ft 11 in)
- Position: Left-back

Senior career*
Years	Team	Apps	(Gls)
1994–1996	Le Touquet		
1996–1998	Bourges		
1998–1999	Beauvais	33	(0)
1999–2001	Gueugnon	85	(1)
2001–2003	Lorient	32	(2)
2003–2004	Clermont	30	(1)
2004–2005	Amiens	24	(0)
2005–2006	Calais		
2006–2008	Yzeure	28	(1)
2008–2009	Boulogne B		
2011–2012	Gueugnon		
- * Club domestic league appearances and goals

Yohan Bouzin (born 20 August 1974) is a French former professional footballer who played as a left-back.

== Honours ==
Gueugnon

- Coupe de la Ligue: 1999–2000

Lorient

- Coupe de France: 2001–02
- Coupe de la Ligue runner-up: 2001–02
