= 2000–01 FC Girondins de Bordeaux season =

Bordeaux
2000–01 season
- Head coach: Élie Baup
- Stadium: Stade Chaban-Delmas
- French Division 1: 4th
- Coupe de France: Round of 32
- UEFA Cup: Fourth round
- Top goalscorer: Pauleta (20)
- Average home league attendance: 29,494
colours	colours	colours

The 2000–01 season was the 120th season in the existence of FC Girondins de Bordeaux and the club's 7th consecutive season in the top flight of French football. In addition to the domestic league, Bordeaux participated in this season's edition of the Coupe de France.

== Competitions ==
=== Overall record ===
Competition	First match	Last match	Starting round	Final position	Record							
Competition	First match	Last match	Starting round	Final position	Pld	W	D	L	GF	GA	GD	Win %
French Division 1	29 July 2000	19 May 2001	Matchday 1	4th	34	15	12	7	48	33	+15	44.12
Coupe de France	19 January 2001	10 February 2001	Round of 64	Round of 32	2	1	0	1	5	1	+4	50.00
Total					36	16	12	8	53	34	+19	44.44

Source: Competitions

=== French Division 1 ===
==== League table ====
Pos	Team	Pld	W	D	L	GF	GA	GD	Pts	Qualification or relegation
2	Lyon	34	17	13	4	57	30	+27	64	Qualification to Champions League first group stage
3	Lille	34	16	11	7	43	27	+16	59	Qualification to Champions League third qualifying round
4	Bordeaux	34	15	12	7	48	33	+15	57	Qualification to UEFA Cup first round
5	Sedan	34	14	10	10	47	40	+7	52	Qualification to UEFA Cup first round
6	Rennes	34	15	5	14	46	37	+9	50	Qualification to Intertoto Cup third round

Source: Ligue 1
Rules for classification: 1) points; 2) goal difference; 3) number of goals scored.

==== Results summary ====
Overall								Home						Away					
Pld	W	D	L	GF	GA	GD	Pts	W	D	L	GF	GA	GD	W	D	L	GF	GA	GD
34	15	12	7	48	33	+15	57	9	6	2	25	15	+10	6	6	5	23	18	+5

Source: French Division 1

==== Results by round ====
Round	1	2	3	4	5	6	7	8	9	10	11	12	13	14	15	16	17	18	19	20	21	22	23	24	25	26	27	28	29	30	31	32	33	34
Ground	H	A	H	A	H	A	H	A	H	A	A	H	A	H	A	H	A	H	A	H	A	H	A	H	A	H	H	A	H	A	H	A	H	A
Result	D	L	D	L	D	W	L	W	W	D	W	D	W	W	W	W	D	D	L	W	D	L	D	W	D	W	W	L	W	D	W	W	D	L
Position	10	16	16	16	16	14	16	16	11	11	5	8	6	3	2	1	1	1	3	1	3	4	3	3	4	3	3	5	4	4	4	3	3	4

Source: French Division 1
A = Away; H = Home; W = Win; D = Draw; L = Loss

==== Matches ====
29 July 2000 1	Bordeaux	1–1	Metz	Bordeaux
CEST (UTC+2)				Stadium: Stade Chaban-Delmas

5 August 2000 2	Bastia	2–0	Bordeaux	Furiani
CEST (UTC+2)

12 August 2000 3	Bordeaux	2–2	Troyes	Bordeaux
CEST (UTC+2)				Stadium: Stade Chaban-Delmas

19 August 2000 4	Saint-Étienne	1–0	Bordeaux	Saint-Étienne
CEST (UTC+2)

26 August 2000 5	Bordeaux	1–1	Lens	Bordeaux
CEST (UTC+2)				Stadium: Stade Chaban-Delmas

6 September 2000 6	Nantes	0–5	Bordeaux	Nantes
CEST (UTC+2)

9 September 2000 7	Bordeaux	0–2	Guingamp	Bordeaux
CEST (UTC+2)				Stadium: Stade Chaban-Delmas

16 September 2000 8	Marseille	0–1	Bordeaux	Marseille
CEST (UTC+2)

23 September 2000 9	Bordeaux	2–1	Toulouse	Bordeaux
CEST (UTC+2)				Stadium: Stade Chaban-Delmas

30 September 2000 10	Monaco	2–2	Bordeaux	Monaco
CEST (UTC+2)

15 October 2000 11	Auxerre	0–2	Bordeaux	Auxerre
CEST (UTC+2)

21 October 2000 12	Bordeaux	1–1	Lyon	Bordeaux
20:00 CEST (UTC+2)				Stadium: Stade Chaban-Delmas; Attendance: 30,126

29 October 2000 13	Paris Saint-Germain	1–2	Bordeaux	Paris
19:00 CEST (UTC+2)				Stadium: Parc des Princes; Attendance: 43,432

4 November 2000 14	Bordeaux	1–0	Lille	Bordeaux
CET (UTC+1)				Stadium: Stade Chaban-Delmas

12 November 2000 15	Strasbourg	0–2	Bordeaux	Strasbourg
17:30 CET (UTC+1)				Stadium: Stade de la Meinau; Attendance: 20,987

19 November 2000 16	Bordeaux	3–0	Rennes	Bordeaux
CET (UTC+1)				Stadium: Stade Chaban-Delmas

26 November 2000 17	Sedan	0–0	Bordeaux	Sedan
20:45 CET (UTC+1)				Stadium: Stade Louis Dugauguez; Attendance: 16,697

29 November 2000 18	Bordeaux	0–0	Bastia	Bordeaux
CET (UTC+1)				Stadium: Stade Chaban-Delmas

2 December 2000 19	Troyes	1–0	Bordeaux	Troyes
20:00 CET (UTC+1)				Stadium: Stade de l'Aube; Attendance: 14,694

10 December 2000 20	Bordeaux	2–1	Saint-Étienne	Bordeaux
CET (UTC+1)				Stadium: Stade Chaban-Delmas

16 December 2000 21	Lens	2–2	Bordeaux	Lens
CEST (UTC+2)

21 December 2000 22	Bordeaux	0–2	Nantes	Bordeaux
CET (UTC+1)				Stadium: Stade Chaban-Delmas

13 January 2001 23	Guingamp	1–1	Bordeaux	Guingamp
CEST (UTC+2)

26 January 2001 24	Bordeaux	3–0	Marseille	Bordeaux
CET (UTC+1)				Stadium: Stade Chaban-Delmas

3 February 2001 25	Toulouse	1–1	Bordeaux	Toulouse
CEST (UTC+2)

7 February 2001 26	Bordeaux	2–1	Monaco	Bordeaux
CET (UTC+1)				Stadium: Stade Chaban-Delmas

18 February 2001 27	Bordeaux	1–0	Auxerre	Bordeaux
CET (UTC+1)				Stadium: Stade Chaban-Delmas

3 March 2001 28	Lyon	2–1	Bordeaux	Lyon
CEST (UTC+2)

18 March 2001 29	Bordeaux	2–0	Paris Saint-Germain	Bordeaux
20:45 CET (UTC+1)				Stadium: Stade Chaban-Delmas; Attendance: 31,703

6 April 2001 30	Lille	2–2	Bordeaux	Lille
CEST (UTC+2)

14 April 2001 31	Bordeaux	2–1	Strasbourg	Bordeaux
CEST (UTC+2)				Stadium: Stade Chaban-Delmas

28 April 2001 32	Rennes	1–2	Bordeaux	Rennes
CEST (UTC+2)

12 May 2001 33	Bordeaux	2–2	Sedan	Bordeaux
CEST (UTC+2)				Stadium: Stade Chaban-Delmas

19 May 2001 34	Metz	2–0	Bordeaux	Metz
CEST (UTC+2)

=== Coupe de France ===
19 January 2001 Round of 64	US Issoire	0–5	Bordeaux
CEST (UTC+2)

10 February 2001 Round of 32	Bordeaux	0–1	Nantes	Bordeaux
CEST (UTC+2)				Stadium: Stade Chaban-Delmas
