= Élie Baup =

French footballer and manager (born 1955)

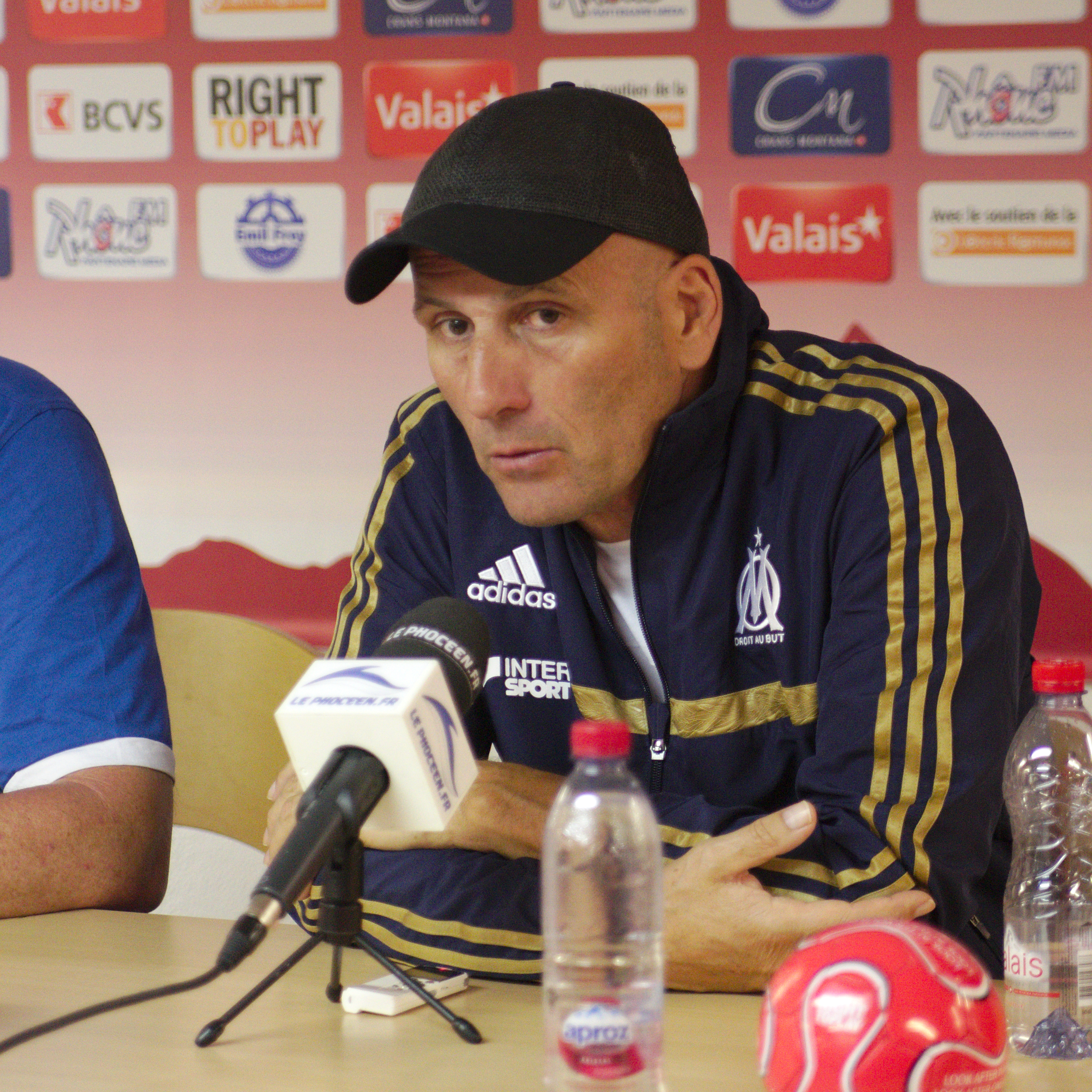
- Baup in 2013

Personal information
- Full name: Élie Baup
- Date of birth: 17 March 1955 (age 71)
- Place of birth: Saint-Gaudens, France
- Height: 1.84 m (6 ft 0 in)
- Position: Goalkeeper (Note: Baup played for the Toulouse youth team in 1970–1974. He also played for US Larroque (1966–1970), SO Mazamet (1974–1978) and AS Muret (1978–1981), but there is no information about appearances and goals.)

Managerial career
- Years: Team
- 1994–1996: Saint-Étienne
- 1998–2003: Bordeaux
- 2004–2006: Saint-Étienne
- 2006–2008: Toulouse
- 2008–2009: Nantes
- 2012–2013: Marseille

Élie Baup (French pronunciation: [eli ˈbop]; born 17 March 1955) is a French football manager and a former footballer who played as a goalkeeper. His last post was the manager of Ligue 1 side Marseille.

== Managerial career ==
=== 1994–2009 ===
As the club manager of Bordeaux, Baup won the French Division 1 championships in 1999 and the Coupe de la Ligue in 2002. He was sacked on 24 October 2003 by the club president Jean-Louis Triaud.

Baup signed on as the manager of Saint-Étienne in 2004, bringing to the club one of his favourite players, Pascal Feindouno. Saint-Étienne had won promotion to Ligue 1 at the end of the 2003–04 season. During Baup's tenure, the club finished sixth and thirteenth in the table respectively in the 2004–05 Ligue 1 and 2005–06 Ligue 1 seasons. He resigned from the club at the end of the 2005–06 season.

In his first season as the manager of the club, Baup guided Toulouse to finish third in the table in the 2006–07 Ligue 1 season. Toulouse thus earned a place in the 2007–08 UEFA Champions League third qualifying round, where it lost to Liverpool 5–0 on aggregate. With Toulouse finishing only 17th in the table in the 2007–08 Ligue 1 season and barely escaping relegation to Ligue 2, Baup was sacked on 30 May 2008, with one year left on his contract.

Baup became the manager of Ligue 1 club Nantes on 28 August 2008. He resigned from the club on 2 June 2009, with over a year to run on his contract, after he had failed to save it from relegation to Ligue 2.

From 2009 to 2012, Baup worked as a football consultant in Canal Football Club, a program that shows highlights of Ligue 1 matches on Canal+.

=== Marseille ===
On 4 July 2012, Baup signed a two-year contract with Marseille as its new manager, succeeding Didier Deschamps, who had left the club two days earlier to become the manager of France. On 2 August 2012, Baup oversaw his first competitive match as Marseille manager, a 1–1 away draw in the 2012–13 Europa League third qualifying round first leg against Turkish club Eskişehirspor. Seven days later, Marseille beat Eskişehirspor 3–0 in the return leg, winning the tie 4–1 on aggregate and thus secured a place in the 2012–13 Europa League play-off round. Marseille eventually qualified for the 2012–13 Europa League group stage, but did not progress from it to the knockout phase. On 12 August 2013, Baup's Marseille won its opening 2012–13 Ligue 1 match away against Reims with a 1–0 scoreline. The club would later achieve its best-ever start to a Ligue 1 or Division 1 season by winning its first six 2012–13 Ligue 1 matches. Marseille would eventually finish the 2012–13 Ligue 1 season in runner-up position, 12 points behind Paris Saint-Germain. Coincidentally, Marseille was defeated in the round of 16 of the 2012–13 Coupe de France and 2012–13 Coupe de la Ligue by Paris Saint-Germain by the same scoreline of 2–0.

In the afternoon of 7 December 2013, the club announced on its website that Baup was no longer the Olympique de Marseille manager. The club president (Vincent Labrune) and Baup had earlier held a meeting right after the end of the training session conducted in the morning of 7 December 2013. "The board feel that, after 17 league matches into the season, results have not corresponded with our objectives and a firm decision had to be taken to get the team moving in the right direction again in the coming weeks," read a statement on the club's official website. Vincent Labrune said that the decision to dismiss Baup was "the most difficult and painful he had had to take since he came to the club". "Elie Baup is unanimously appreciated for his qualities as a person," Labrune added. "Nobody can forget the job he has done at Olympique de Marseille. He enabled us to finish second last season when nobody expected us to." The decision to sack Baup came just a day after Marseille lost 1–0 to Nantes at the Stade Velodrome in a Ligue 1 match that left them in fifth position and 13 points behind leaders Paris Saint-Germain in the Ligue 1 table at the conclusion of the week 17 matches. Marseille had also fared poorly in the 2013–14 UEFA Champions League. They had so far failed to pick up a single point from their first five Group F matches against Arsenal, Borussia Dortmund and Napoli, thus ensuring that they would finish at the bottom of the group.

== Trophies as a manager ==
Bordeaux

- French Division 1: 1998–99
- Coupe de la Ligue: 2001–02

== Managerial statistics ==
As of 7 December 2013.

Team	From	To	Record				
Team	From	To	G	W	D	L	Win %
Saint-Étienne	1994	1996	68	15	23	30	22.06
Bordeaux	1998	24 October 2003	274	134	66	74	48.91
Saint-Étienne	1 July 2004	31 May 2006	87	27	34	26	31.03
Toulouse	31 May 2006	30 May 2008	90	27	27	36	30.00
Nantes	4 September 2008	1 June 2009	40	9	11	20	22.50
Marseille	4 July 2012	7 December 2013	71	32	15	24	45.07
Total			630	244	176	210	38.73
