= David Bouard =

French footballer (born 1977)

Personal information
- Full name: David Bouard
- Date of birth: 12 March 1977 (age 49)
- Place of birth: Quimper, France
- Height: 1.82 m (5 ft 11 1/2 in)
- Position: Midfielder

Senior career*
Years	Team	Apps	(Gls)
1997–1998	Caen B	29	(3)
1998–1999	Lorient B	31	(4)
1999–2004	Lorient	125	(5)
2004–2007	Niort	91	(5)
2007–2010	Brest	83	(1)
2010–2011	Vannes	23	(0)
Total		382	(18)

International career
2011	Brittany	1	(0)
- * Club domestic league appearances and goals

David Bouard (born 12 March 1977) is a retired French footballer who played as a midfielder.

His previous clubs include SM Caen, FC Lorient, Chamois Niortais and Stade Brestois 29.

== Honours ==
Lorient

- Coupe de France winners: 2001–02

Chamois Niortais

- Championnat National champions: 2005–06
