= Loïc Druon =

French footballer (born 1971)

Personal information
- Date of birth: 23 August 1971 (age 55)
- Place of birth: Quimper, France
- Height: 1.74 m (5 ft 9 in)
- Position: Defender

Youth career
- –1993: Quimper

Senior career*
Years	Team	Apps	(Gls)
1992–1993	Quimper		
1993–1997	Stade Briochin	114+ (Note: Statistics are missing for the 1995–96 season.)	(1+)
1997–1998	Châtearoux	30	(0)
1998–2003	Lorient	158	(5)
2003–2005	Clermont	37	(0)
2005–2007	Concarneau		
2007–2008	US Crozon Morgat		
2009–2014	AS Plouhinec		

International career
1998	Brittany	1	(0)

Managerial career
- 2009–2014: AS Plouhinec
- 2014–2020: ES Clohars-Fouesnant
- * Club domestic league appearances and goals

Loïc Druon (born 23 August 1971) is a French football manager and former player who played as a defender.

== Honours ==
Châteauroux

- Division 2: 1996–97

Lorient

- Coupe de France: 2001–02
- Coupe de la Ligue runner-up: 2001–02
