= Antoine Cuissard =

French footballer (1924–1997)

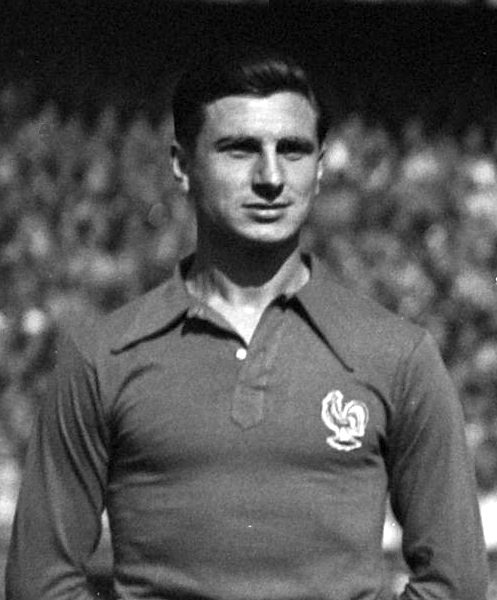
- Cuissard in 1949

Personal information
- Date of birth: 19 July 1924
- Place of birth: Saint-Étienne, France
- Date of death: 3 November 1997 (aged 73)
- Place of death: Saint-Brieuc, France
- Position: Midfielder

Youth career
- –1944: Lorient

Senior career*
Years	Team	Apps	(Gls)
1944–1946	Saint-Étienne		
1946–1947	Lorient		
1947–1952	Saint-Étienne	109	(23)
1952–1953	Cannes	7	(2)
1953–1955	Nice	79	(15)
1955–1959	Rennes	116	(44)

International career
1946–1954	France	27	(1)

Managerial career
- 1961–1964: Rennes
- 1967–1969: Lorient
- 1971–1972: Ajaccio
- 1972–1974: Vevey Sports
- 1975–1976: Rennes
- * Club domestic league appearances and goals

Antoine Cuissard (19 July 1924 – 3 November 1997) was a French football midfielder and manager.
