= 2001–02 French Division 1 =

64th season of French Division 1

Division 1
- Season: 2001–02
- Dates: 27 July 2001 – 4 May 2002
- Champions: Lyon (1st title)
- Relegated: Metz; Lorient
- Matches: 306
- Goals: 736 (2.41 per match)
- Best player: Pauleta
- Top goalscorer: Djibril Cissé (22 goals)

Lyon won Division 1 season 2001/2002 of the French Association Football League with 66 points. The title was decided in the very final game of the season when Lyon defeated erstwhile championship leaders Lens at Stade Gerland. Lyon had to win the match to take the title, and won 3–1, ending Lens's title dream. It was Lyon's first league championship, and it began their record seven successive league titles.

== Participating teams ==
- Auxerre
- Bastia
- Bordeaux
- Guingamp
- Lens
- Lille
- Lorient
- Lyon
- Marseille
- Metz
- Monaco
- Montpellier
- Nantes
- Paris Saint-Germain
- Rennes
- Sedan
- Sochaux
- Troyes
Location of teams in 2001–02 Ligue 1

== League table ==
Pos	Team	Pld	W	D	L	GF	GA	GD	Pts	Qualification or relegation
1	Lyon (C)	34	20	6	8	62	32	+30	66	Qualification to Champions League first group stage
2	Lens	34	18	10	6	55	30	+25	64	Qualification to Champions League first group stage
3	Auxerre	34	16	11	7	48	38	+10	59	Qualification to Champions League third qualifying round
4	Paris Saint-Germain	34	15	13	6	43	24	+19	58	Qualification to UEFA Cup first round
5	Lille	34	15	11	8	39	32	+7	56	Qualification to Intertoto Cup third round
6	Bordeaux	34	14	8	12	34	31	+3	50	Qualification to UEFA Cup first round (Note: Bordeaux was qualified for the 2002–03 UEFA Cup as winners of the 2001–02 Coupe de la Ligue.)
7	Troyes	34	13	8	13	40	35	+5	47	Qualification to Intertoto Cup second round
8	Sochaux	34	12	10	12	41	40	+1	46	Qualification to Intertoto Cup second round
9	Marseille	34	11	11	12	34	39	−5	44	
10	Nantes	34	12	7	15	35	41	−6	43	
11	Bastia	34	12	5	17	38	44	−6	41	
12	Rennes	34	11	8	15	40	51	−11	41	
13	Montpellier	34	9	13	12	28	31	−3	40	
14	Sedan	34	8	15	11	35	39	−4	39	
15	Monaco	34	9	12	13	36	41	−5	39	
16	Guingamp	34	9	8	17	34	57	−23	35	
17	Metz (R)	34	9	6	19	31	47	−16	33	Relegation to Ligue 2
18	Lorient (R)	34	7	10	17	43	64	−21	31	UEFA Cup first round and relegated to Ligue 2 (Note: Lorient was qualified for the 2002–03 UEFA Cup as winners of the 2001–02 Coupe de France.)

Source: Ligue 1
Rules for classification: 1) points; 2) goal difference; 3) number of goals scored.
(C) Champions; (R) Relegated
Notes:

Promoted from Ligue 2, who will play in Ligue 1 season 2002/2003

- AC Ajaccio : champion of Ligue 2
- RC Strasbourg : runners-up
- OGC Nice : third place
- Le Havre AC : fourth place

=== Position by round ===
Team ╲ Round	1	2	3	4	5	6	7	8	9	10	11	12	13	14	15	16	17	18	19	20	21	22	23	24	25	26	27	28	29	30	31	32	33	34
Lyon	16	8	4	3	2	3	3	4	1	3	3	4	3	2	2	2	2	2	2	2	2	2	2	2	2	2	2	2	2	2	2	2	2	1
Lens	4	1	1	1	1	2	1	3	4	2	1	1	1	1	1	1	1	1	1	1	1	1	1	1	1	1	1	1	1	1	1	1	1	2
Auxerre	1	3	2	2	3	1	2	1	2	4	4	3	4	3	4	4	3	3	3	3	3	3	3	3	3	3	3	3	3	3	4	3	3	3
PSG	12	13	8	7	4	6	5	6	8	8	8	7	8	8	8	7	5	5	5	6	5	4	4	4	4	4	4	4	4	4	3	4	4	4
Lille	11	4	6	4	5	4	4	2	3	1	2	2	2	4	3	3	4	4	4	4	6	6	5	5	5	5	5	5	5	5	5	5	5	5
Bordeaux	3	5	7	10	12	14	12	7	6	6	7	5	5	7	5	5	6	6	6	5	4	5	6	6	6	6	6	6	6	6	6	6	6	6
Troyes	2	6	9	5	7	9	13	9	10	7	6	8	7	6	6	6	8	7	7	7	7	7	7	7	7	7	7	7	7	7	7	7	7	7
Sochaux	6	2	3	6	6	5	6	5	5	5	5	6	6	5	7	8	7	8	8	8	9	9	9	9	9	12	9	8	8	8	8	8	8	8
Marseille	9	12	15	16	16	16	17	16	17	14	14	15	13	14	9	10	10	10	10	12	12	12	12	13	12	8	10	9	10	10	12	10	9	9
Nantes	15	17	17	18	18	18	18	18	18	18	18	18	18	18	18	18	18	18	18	17	14	14	13	12	13	14	14	14	13	12	11	9	11	10
Bastia	10	14	16	11	9	7	7	8	7	9	11	13	9	11	14	15	13	11	11	13	13	13	14	14	14	13	13	13	14	13	14	13	14	11
Rennais	18	18	12	8	13	10	9	14	16	13	10	11	14	9	10	11	12	12	14	14	15	18	16	16	15	15	15	15	15	15	15	15	15	12
Montpellier	8	11	5	9	11	12	10	13	14	16	16	14	16	13	13	9	9	9	9	9	8	8	8	8	8	10	11	12	12	14	13	14	10	13
Sedan	7	16	14	15	14	13	11	17	15	17	17	17	17	17	17	16	16	14	12	11	11	10	11	10	10	9	12	10	9	9	9	11	13	14
Monaco	13	15	18	17	17	15	15	10	13	10	12	10	11	10	12	12	14	15	13	10	10	11	10	11	11	11	8	11	11	11	10	12	12	15
Guingamp	17	10	10	13	10	11	14	15	11	12	9	12	12	12	11	14	11	13	15	15	16	16	15	15	17	16	17	16	16	16	18	17	17	16
Metz	14	7	13	14	15	17	16	12	12	15	15	16	15	16	15	13	15	16	16	16	17	15	17	17	16	17	18	18	18	17	16	16	16	17
Loreint	5	9	11	12	8	8	8	11	9	11	13	9	10	15	16	17	17	17	17	18	18	17	18	18	18	18	16	17	17	18	17	18	18	18

Champions of 2001-02 Division 1
Qualified for UEFA Champions League
Qualified for UEFA Cup
Relegation to Ligue 2

First match(es) will be played on ?. Source:

== Results ==
Home \ Away	AUX	BAS	BOR	GUI	RCL	LIL	LOR	OL	OM	MET	ASM	MHS	NAN	PSG	REN	SED	SOC	TRO
Auxerre		1–0	0–1	2–2	1–0	2–1	2–2	0–1	2–0	3–2	2–0	1–0	2–1	1–1	2–3	2–1	2–0	1–3
Bastia	0–1		1–2	3–0	3–1	1–0	3–1	1–2	1–0	1–2	1–0	3–0	0–2	0–1	1–2	1–1	3–0	2–0
Bordeaux	1–1	2–1		2–0	2–1	0–0	2–1	0–1	0–0	1–0	0–0	3–1	2–0	1–0	2–1	2–1	0–1	2–3
Guingamp	0–0	1–0	2–1		1–0	0–0	4–3	2–4	1–0	0–2	2–1	2–2	1–0	0–1	1–1	1–2	0–0	1–0
Lens	1–1	7–0	0–0	4–1		1–1	1–1	2–0	2–0	2–2	1–0	2–0	3–0	1–1	2–0	1–0	3–0	0–0
Lille	2–3	2–1	2–2	1–0	0–1		3–1	2–0	2–0	2–0	1–1	2–1	1–0	1–0	1–0	1–1	1–2	1–0
Lorient	0–1	0–0	0–2	6–2	2–3	2–4		0–3	2–2	1–0	2–0	1–0	1–2	1–1	2–0	1–1	1–1	1–0
Lyon	3–0	0–0	1–0	3–0	3–1	4–2	2–0		4–0	4–1	1–0	0–0	4–1	3–0	4–0	2–0	1–1	3–1
Marseille	3–0	2–2	0–0	2–1	1–2	0–0	3–2	0–0		1–0	1–1	1–0	2–0	1–0	2–1	2–1	4–2	0–1
Metz	2–0	0–1	1–2	2–4	0–1	0–1	1–1	2–0	0–2		1–0	0–0	2–0	0–2	3–1	2–3	2–0	2–1
Monaco	1–1	1–1	3–1	3–1	3–0	2–2	1–0	2–1	1–1	2–2		0–0	1–2	2–2	3–1	2–0	0–1	2–0
Montpellier	0–0	2–1	0–0	2–1	1–2	2–0	1–3	3–0	1–1	3–0	1–1		3–0	0–0	0–0	0–0	0–0	2–0
Nantes	2–2	1–2	2–1	2–0	1–2	0–1	2–0	3–0	3–1	0–0	2–1	1–2		1–2	3–1	1–1	0–0	1–0
Paris SG	0–0	1–0	1–0	1–1	2–2	0–0	5–0	2–2	0–0	2–0	1–2	0–0	1–1		3–0	3–0	1–0	3–1
Rennes	0–5	2–1	1–0	2–1	1–2	4–0	1–1	2–2	2–1	0–0	3–0	2–0	2–0	1–2		1–0	1–1	0–1
Sedan	3–3	0–2	1–0	1–1	1–1	1–1	5–0	2–1	1–1	2–0	0–0	2–0	0–0	1–2	0–0		2–1	0–0
Sochaux	1–2	4–1	2–0	1–0	0–2	0–0	2–2	2–1	3–0	2–0	3–0	0–1	0–1	0–2	4–3	3–0		2–2
Troyes	1–2	3–0	2–0	3–0	1–1	0–1	4–2	0–2	1–0	2–0	3–0	2–0	0–0	1–0	1–1	1–1	2–2	

Source: Ligue 1
Legend: Blue = home team win; Yellow = draw; Red = away team win.

== Top goalscorers ==
Rank	Player	Club	Goals
1	(France) Djibril Cissé	Auxerre	22
1	(Portugal) Pauleta	Bordeaux	22
3	(France) Jean-Claude Darcheville	Lorient	19
4	(France) Nicolas Goussé	Troyes	15
5	(Democratic Republic of the Congo) Shabani Nonda	Monaco	14
5	(France) Pierre-Alain Frau	Sochaux	14
5	(Brazil) Sonny Anderson	Lyon	14
5	(France) Tony Vairelles	Bastia	14
9	(France) Daniel Moreira	Lens	11
9	(France) Bruno Cheyrou	Lille	11

== Awards ==
=== Individual awards ===
Award	Winner	Club
Ligue 1 Player of the Year	(Portugal) Pauleta	Bordeaux
Ligue 1 Young Player of the Year	(France) Djibril Cissé	AJ Auxerre
Ligue 1 Goalkeeper of the Year	(France) Ulrich Ramé	Bordeaux
Ligue 1 Manager of the Year	(France) Joël Muller	RC Lens

Team of the Year
Goalkeeper	(France) Ulrich Ramé (Bordeaux)			
Defenders	(France) Stéphane Pichot (Lille)	(France) Philippe Mexès (Auxerre)	(France) David Sommeil (Bordeaux)	(Argentina) Gabriel Heinze (Paris Saint-Germain)
Midfielders	(France) Stéphane Pédron (Lens)	(Spain) Mikel Arteta (Paris Saint-Germain)	(France) Jocelyn Blanchard (Lens)	(Brazil) Ronaldinho (Paris Saint-Germain)
Forwards	(France) Djibril Cissé (Auxerre)	(Portugal) Pauleta (Bordeaux)		

== Attendances ==
No.	Club	Average attendance	Change	Highest
1	Olympique de Marseille	50,072	-1.4%	58,000
2	Paris Saint-Germain FC	41,040	-4.0%	45,000
3	RC Lens	37,506	-5.4%	40,811
4	Olympique lyonnais	34,844	0.3%	42,000
5	FC Nantes	33,385	3.0%	36,000
6	Girondins de Bordeaux	27,867	-5.5%	33,000
7	FC Metz	17,935	-2.5%	25,697
8	Stade rennais	17,877	-7.8%	22,656
9	LOSC	17,837	4.4%	20,380
10	CS Sedan	16,582	14.7%	22,008
11	FC Sochaux	16,477	27.2%	19,907
12	ESTAC	13,926	-4.9%	18,000
13	MHSC	13,864	57.2%	30,000
14	AJ Auxerre	12,248	16.5%	20,000
15	EA Guingamp	12,201	-7.0%	16,400
16	FC Lorient	12,163	79.7%	18,000
17	AS Monaco	8,543	-5.5%	15,000
18	SC Bastia	7,221	-2.7%	11,640
