= Tchiressoua Guel =

Ivorian footballer (born 1975)

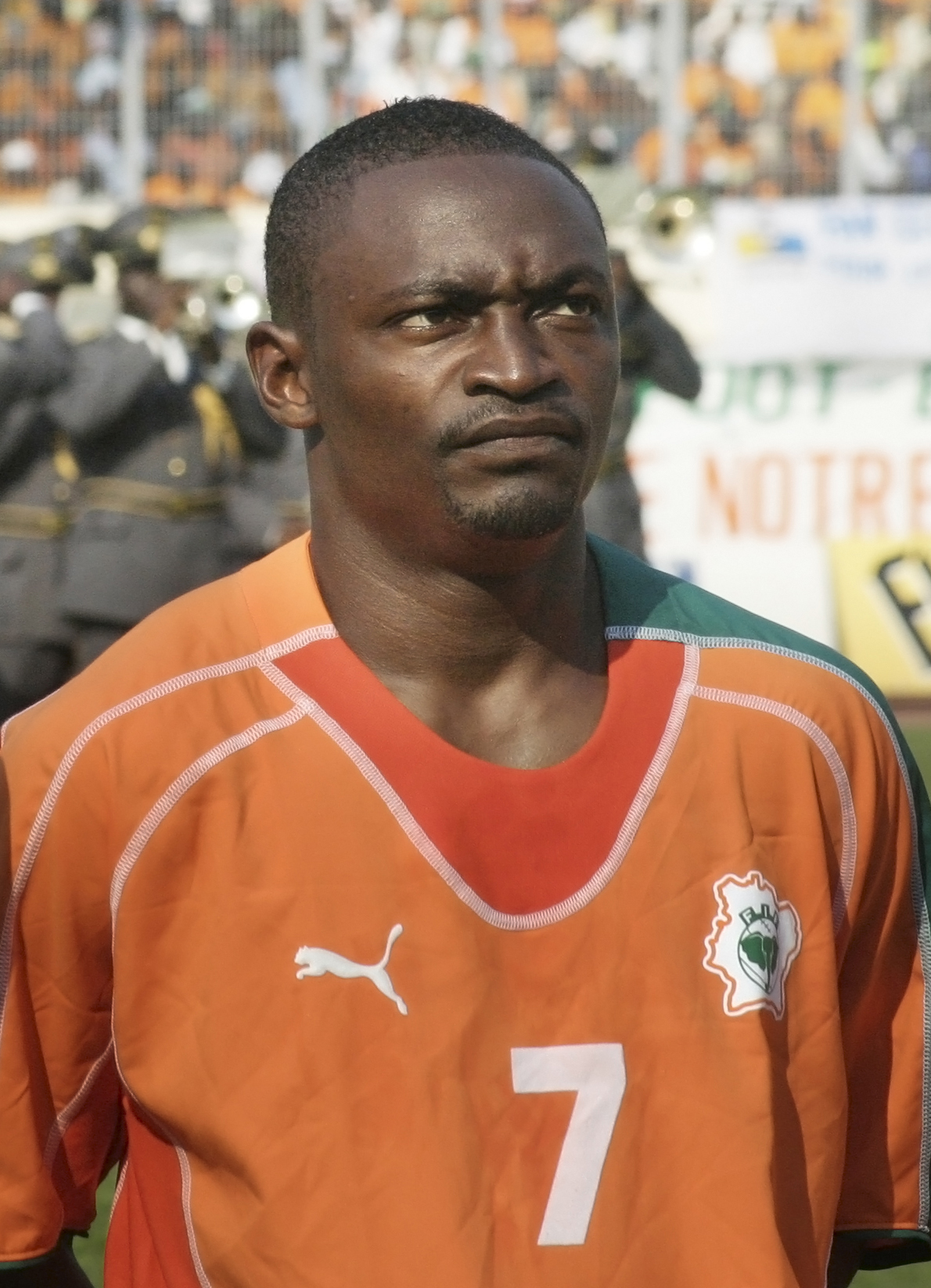
- Tchiressoua Guel in 2005

Personal information
- Full name: Tchiressoua Guel
- Date of birth: 27 December 1975 (age 50)
- Place of birth: Sikensi, Ivory Coast
- Height: 1.66 m (5 ft 5 in)
- Position: Midfielder

Senior career*
Years	Team	Apps	(Gls)
1995–1998	ASEC Mimosas	?	(?)
1998–1999	Marseille	2	(0)
1999–2001	Saint-Étienne	52	(3)
2001–2004	Lorient	95	(17)
2004–2005	Ankaragücü	15	(0)
2005	Nancy	6	(0)
2005–2006	Lorient	19	(2)
2007–2008	Ironi Kiryat Shmona	33	(2)
Total		222	(24)

International career
1993–2006	Ivory Coast	72	(10)
- * Club domestic league appearances and goals

Tchiressoua Guel (born 27 December 1975) is an Ivorian former professional footballer who played as a midfielder.

Guel played for various clubs in France's Ligue 1 and Ligue 2, including Olympique de Marseille, AS Saint-Étienne and FC Lorient. (Note: Tchiressoua Guel – French league stats at LFP – also available in French (archived)) He also spent a period in the Turkish Süper Lig with MKE Ankaragücü.

Guel made 72 appearances scoring nine goals for Ivory Coast, including participating at the 1994, 1996, 1998, 2000 and 2002 African Cup of Nations.

== Club career ==
Guel was born in Sikensi, Ivory Coast.

In October 2008 Guel stated he wanted a move to an English side and it was reported that he had attracted attention from London clubs Millwall and Charlton Athletic.

== Personal life ==
Guel acquired French nationality by naturalization on 9 July 2003. His son, Moussa Guel, is a professional footballer with FC Lorient.

== Career statistics ==
=== International ===
Scores and results list Ivory Coast's goal tally first, score column indicates score after each Gual goal.

List of international goals scored by Tchiressoua Guel
No.	Date	Venue	Opponent	Score	Result	Competition
1	27 March 1994	Sousse Olympic Stadium, Sousse, Tunisia	Sierra Leone	2–0	4–0	1994 Africa Cup of Nations
2	8 January 1997	Stade Bouaké, Bouaké, Ivory Coast	Guinea	2–1	2–1	Friendly
3	26 January 1997	Stade Bouaké, Bouaké, Ivory Coast	Benin	1–0	1–0	1998 Africa Cup of Nations qualification
4	27 July 1997	Stade Bouaké, Bouaké, Ivory Coast	Mali	3–1	4–2	1998 Africa Cup of Nations qualification
5	16 February 1998	Stade Municipal, Ouagadougou, Burkina Faso	Angola	1–0	5–2	1998 Africa Cup of Nations
6	16 February 1998	Stade Municipal, Ouagadougou, Burkina Faso	Angola	2–0	5–2	1998 Africa Cup of Nations
7	29 December 1999	Felix Houphouet Boigny Stadium, Abidjan, Ivory Coast	Burkina Faso	1–1	3–1	Friendly
8	24 January 2000	Accra Sports Stadium, Accra, Ghana	Togo	1–0	1–1	2000 African Cup of Nations
9	10 March 2001	Stade des Martyrs, Kinshasa, DR Congo	DR Congo	1–0	2–1	2002 FIFA World Cup qualification
10	11 February 2003	Stade Gaston-Petit, Châteauroux, France	Cameroon	1–0	3–0	Friendly

== Honours ==
=== Club ===
ASEC Mimosas

- Ligue 1: 1997, 1998
- Coupe de Côte d'Ivoire: 1997
- Coupe Houphouët-Boigny: 1997, 1998
- CAF Champions League: 1998

Marseille

- French Division 1: 1998–99 runner-up
- UEFA Cup: 1998–99 runner-up

Lorient

- Coupe de la Ligue: 2002 runner-up
- Coupe de France: 2002
- Trophée des Champions: 2002 runner-up

=== International ===
Ivory Coast

- African Cup of Nations: 1994 bronze medalist

=== Individual ===
- Ligue 1 top scorer: 1997
