= Richard Martini (footballer) =

French footballer (born 1978)

Personal information
- Date of birth: 26 August 1978 (age 48)
- Place of birth: Marseille, France
- Height: 1.84 m (6 ft 0 in)
- Position: Defender

Team information
- Current team: US La Cadière

Senior career*
Years	Team	Apps	(Gls)
1997–2002	Marseille B		
1999–2002	Marseille	3	(0)
2000–2001	→ Martigues (loan)	37	(2)
2001–2005	Lorient	95	(5)
2005–2007	Guingamp	67	(1)
2007–2009	Châteauroux	37	(0)
2010–2012	AS Gémenos		
2012–2014	CA Gombertois		

Managerial career
- 2015–2016: Toulon-Le Las (assistant)
- 2016–2017: Toulon B (assistant)
- 2017–: US La Cadière
- * Club domestic league appearances and goals

Richard Martini (born 26 August 1978) is a French football manager and former player who, as of 2021, is the head coach of Départemental 2 club US La Cadière. As a player, he was a defender, and played professional football for Marseille, Martigues, Lorient, Guingamp, and Châteauroux.

== Honours ==
Marseille B

- Championnat de France Amateur: 2001–02

Lorient

- Coupe de France: 2001–02
- Coupe de la Ligue runner-up: 2001–02
