= Camel Meriem =

French footballer (born 1979)

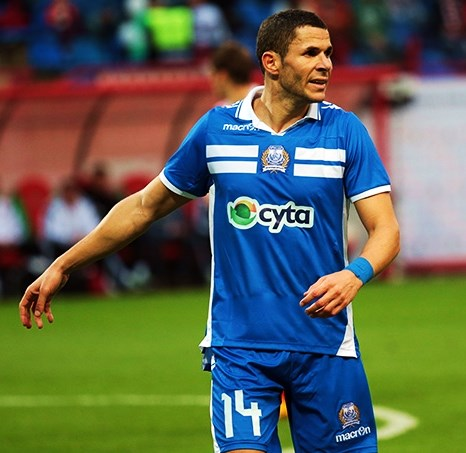
- Meriem with Apollon Limassol in 2014

Personal information
- Date of birth: 18 October 1979 (age 47)
- Place of birth: Audincourt, Doubs, France
- Height: 1.74 m (5 ft 9 in)
- Position: Midfielder

Youth career
- 1992–1998: Sochaux

Senior career*
Years	Team	Apps	(Gls)
1998–2002	Sochaux	82	(9)
2002–2005	Bordeaux	82	(8)
2003–2004	→ Marseille (loan)	31	(3)
2005–2010	Monaco	110	(8)
2010	Aris	9	(0)
2010–2011	Arles-Avignon	32	(2)
2011–2013	Nice	38	(3)
2013–2015	Apollon Limassol	61	(4)
Total		445	(37)

International career
1999–2002	France U21	12	(0)
2004–2005	France	3	(0)
Medal record
Men's football
Representing France
UEFA European Under-21 Championship
Runner-up	2002
- * Club domestic league appearances and goals

Camel Meriem (born 18 October 1979) is a French former professional footballer who played as a midfielder for Sochaux, Bordeaux, Marseille, AS Monaco, Aris, Arles-Avignon, OGC Nice, and Apollon Limassol. He has represented France at international level.

== Club career ==
Born in Audincourt, Doubs, to Algerian parents, Meriem began his career with Sochaux, where he played 82 games and scored eight goals in five years.

In January 2002 he signed for Bordeaux and later that season he played and scored as his new side won the 2002 Coupe de la Ligue Final. He played three seasons with Bordeaux, representing his team in another 82 games, scoring eight goals before playing in the 2003–04 season on loan for Marseille, for whom he played in the 2004 UEFA Cup Final.

After the end of the season 2003–04 he returned to Bordeaux before signing in August 2005 for Monaco. After 110 games and eight goals in four seasons he was released by Monaco in the summer of 2009. He became a free agent and joined Bolton Wanderers on trial on 14 October 2009. On 26 October 2009, it was revealed that Meriem was now training and having talks with Sam Allardyce at Blackburn Rovers in a deal that could see him joining the Lancashire based club until the end of the 2009–10 Premier League season. He returned to Blackburn Rovers for a second round of trials, however the trial was terminated early when Meriem picked up a knee injury. He returned to Rovers just after the new year (2009–2010) for a third trial and talks over a deal to join the club.

On 5 February 2010, Meriem signed a contract with Greek club Aris on a 1.5-year contract. On 24 June 2010, Aris re-signed his contract and released the French midfielder into the free agent pool.

On 9 August, Meriem signed a one-year contract plus an option for another year with newly promoted Ligue 1 club AC Arles-Avignon. He left Arles-Avignon in June 2011 on a free transfer and OGC Nice. Nice released him after him in 2013.

Apollon Limassol announced the signing of 33-year-old French midfielder Camel Meriem on a 1+1 year contract. At the end of the season 2014–15 Meriem decided to leave the island of Cyprus, leaving behind two successful years with Apollon Limassol. Apollon Limassol finished 3rd and participated in the Europa League group stages both years.

In January 2017, Meriem joined AS Monaco third's team in the French seventh tier.

== International career ==
Meriem earned his first national cap with the France national team on 17 November 2004 against Poland in a 0–0 draw.

== Style of play ==
Meriem was a playmaker well known for his vision and precise passing.

== Personal life ==
His brother is FC Tournai midfielder Samir Meriem.

== Honours ==
Sochaux

- Division 2: 2000–01

Bordeaux

- Coupe de la Ligue: 2001–02
