= Sébastien Hamel =

French footballer (born 1975)

Sébastian Hamel
Personal information
- Date of birth: 20 November 1975 (age 50)
- Place of birth: Arpajon, France
- Height: 1.82 m (6 ft 0 in)
- Position: Goalkeeper

Youth career
- 1991–1993: Monaco

Senior career*
Years	Team	Apps	(Gls)
1993–1994	Monaco	0	(0)
1994–2000	Le Havre	65	(0)
2000–2001	Lens	0	(0)
2001–2002	Lorient	15	(0)
2002–2006	Auxerre	3	(0)
2006–2008	Marseille	0	(0)
2008–2009	Toulouse	0	(0)
Total		83	(0)
- * Club domestic league appearances and goals

Sébastien Hamel (born 20 November 1975) is a French former professional footballer who played as a goalkeeper.

== Career ==
=== Monaco ===
Born in Arpajon, Essonne, Hamel started his career at AS Monaco as a trainee in 1991 before turning professional in 1993. He failed to make an appearance in his one professional season with Monaco and joined fellow Ligue 1 side, Le Havre, in the summer of 1994.

=== Le Havre ===
Hamel again failed to become a regular for his new club, going three seasons without a league appearance until he made his debut in the 1997–98 season. He established himself as the number one goalkeeper at the club in his final season with them, and at the end of the 1999–2000 season, with Le Havre relegated to Ligue 2, he moved to Lens in order to stay in the top French division.

=== Lens ===
Hamel only spent one unsuccessful season with Lens. After failing to make an appearance in any competition, he left to join fellow Ligue 1 side, FC Lorient in 2001.

=== Lorient ===
Hamel played inconsistently at Lorient, appearing for them in 15 league matches, and after Lorient were relegated at the end of the season, Hamel again moved to preserve his top flight status, joining UEFA Champions League qualifiers AJ Auxerre.

Whilst at Lorient Hamel played in the 2002 Coupe de France Final in which they beat SC Bastia.

=== Auxerre ===
Hamel spent four seasons at Auxerre and made three appearances. One came in the 2004–05 season and two more in the 2005–06 season. After his contract expired at the end of the season, he joined Olympique Marseille in the summer of 2006.

=== Marseille ===
Again Hamel was only used as a backup goalkeeper, and after two seasons with Marseille and not one appearance, he once again changed clubs, joining Toulouse for the beginning of the 2008–09 season.
