= Pascal Bedrossian =

French professional footballer (born 1974)

Personal information
- Date of birth: 28 November 1974 (age 51)
- Place of birth: Marseille, France
- Height: 1.73 m (5 ft 8 in)
- Positions: Attacking midfielder; striker

Team information
- Current team: UGA Ardziv

Youth career
- 1992–1994: Cannes

Senior career*
Years	Team	Apps	(Gls)
1992–1997	Cannes	84	(7)
1997–1998	Rennes	6	(0)
1998–2004	Lorient	58	(4)
2004–2005	Angers	18	(1)
2006–2007	Chicago Fire	7	(0)
2007–2008	US Crozon-Morgat		
2008–2009	UGA Ardziv		
- * Club domestic league appearances and goals

Pascal Bedrossian (born 28 November 1974) is a French professional footballer who is head coach at Chicago Fire's Academy.

== Career ==
Born in Marseille, France, Bedrossian began his playing career for the France nationalUnder-15 team, representing them to the Under-21 level. He then played club football on the youth squad of AS Cannes in 1993, and played in the same youth squad that produced the likes of David Jemmali, Patrick Vieira, and Johan Micoud. After enjoying spells with AS Cannes and Stade Rennais, Bedrossian was involved in two relegation campaigns and one promotion campaign to Ligue 1 for Lorient, and, more prominently, was a member of the Lorient squad that won the 2002 Coupe de France, the team's first and only championship in the history of the tournament. Later that year, Bedrossian appeared in both legs in Lorient's UEFA Cup exit from qualification at the hands of Turkish side Denizlispor, losing 3–3 on aggregate. In 2004, Bedrossian joined Ligue 2 side Angers SCO. At the end of that campaign, he suffered an injury that has kept him away from football for the 2005 season. He then signed with the American side Chicago Fire.

Bedrossian was released from the Chicago Fire in June 2007.

He is now head coach at Chicago Fire's Academy.

Furthermore, Bedrossian is a soccer coach for middle and high school at the Lycée Français de Chicago. He is also employed as the Dean's assistant and helps with many extracurricular activities. He sometimes accompanies students for sports tournaments and various competitions across the globe.

== Personal life ==
Bedrossian's idol is basketball star Michael Jordan, and one of the first things Bedrossian did after arriving in Chicago was to find Jordan's house and take a photograph of it.
