= Pape Malick Diop =

Senegalese footballer (born 1974)

Personal information
- Date of birth: 29 December 1974 (age 51)
- Place of birth: Cherif-Lô, Senegal
- Height: 1.87 m (6 ft 2 in)
- Position: Defender

Senior career*
Years	Team	Apps	(Gls)
1995–1998	ASC Jeanne d'Arc	72	(3)
1999–2000	Strasbourg	5	(0)
2000–2001	Neuchâtel Xamax	21	(0)
2001–2005	Lorient	22	(2)
2005–2006	Guingamp	83	(3)
2006–2008	Metz	4	(0)
Total		207	(8)

International career
1998–2006	Senegal	56	(2)
- * Club domestic league appearances and goals

Pape Malick Diop (born 29 December 1974) is a Senegalese former professional footballer who played as a defender for ASC Jeanne d'Arc, Strasbourg, Neuchâtel Xamax, Lorient, Guingamp and Metz. At international level, he made 56 appearances the Senegal national team scoring twice, also participating at the 2002 FIFA World Cup.

Whilst at Lorient Diop played in the 2002 Coupe de France final in which they beat Bastia.
