= Jean-Claude Darcheville =

French footballer (born 1975)

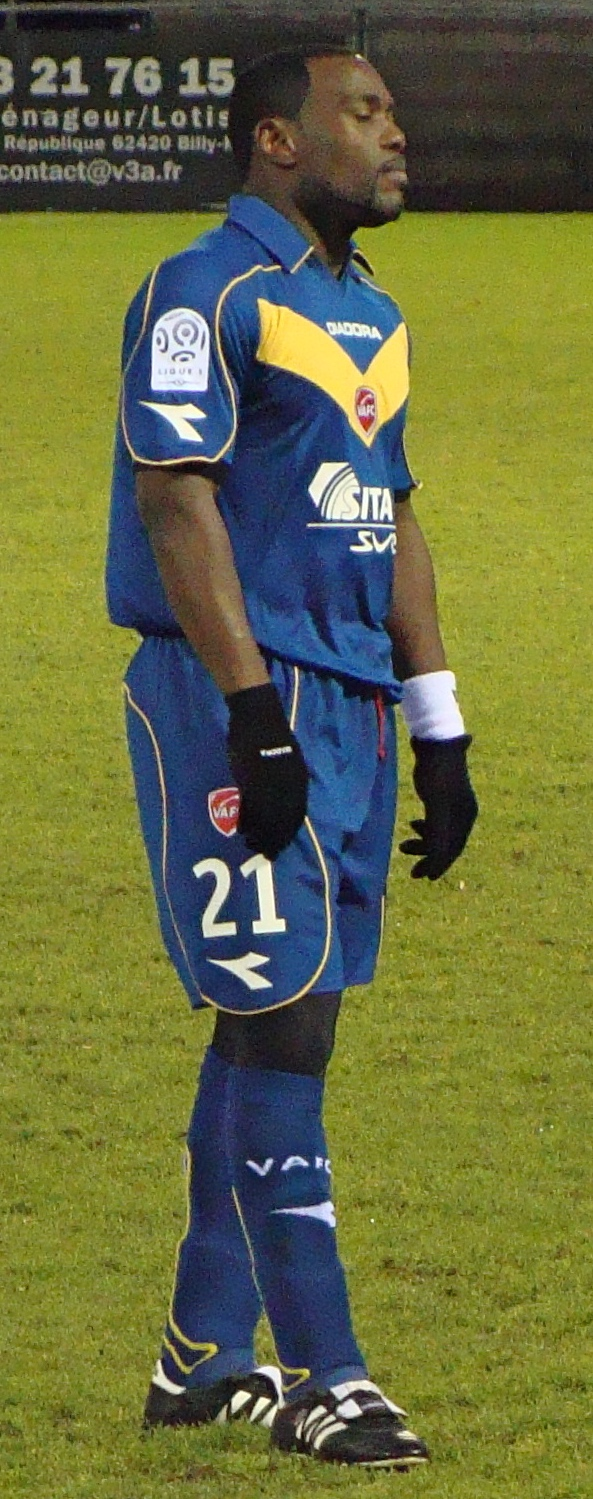
- Darcheville in 2009

Personal information
- Full name: Jean-Claude Jacques Ducan Darcheville
- Date of birth: 25 July 1975 (age 51)
- Place of birth: Sinnamary, French Guiana, France
- Height: 1.78 m (5 ft 10 in)
- Position: Striker

Team information
- Current team: Saint Martin (manager)

Senior career*
Years	Team	Apps	(Gls)
1994–1995	Sinnamary	9	(1)
1995–1999	Rennes	42	(5)
1998–1999	→ Nottingham Forest (loan)	16	(2)
1999–2002	Lorient	102	(44)
2002–2007	Bordeaux	131	(37)
2007–2009	Rangers	38	(13)
2009	Valenciennes	10	(4)
2009–2010	Nantes	27	(6)
2010–2011	Kavala	9	(2)
2011–2013	Sinnamary		
2013–2014	Saint-Georges		(4)
Total		384+	(118+)

International career
1993	France U21	1	(0)
2012	French Guiana	7	(3)

Managerial career
- 2022–2025: French Guiana
- 2025–: Saint Martin
- * Club domestic league appearances and goals

Jean-Claude Jacques Ducan Darcheville (French pronunciation: [ʒɑ̃ klod dykɑ̃ daʁʃ(ə)vil]; born 25 July 1975) is a French former professional footballer who played as a striker. He played for various clubs in France, England, Scotland, and Greece. He represented French Guiana at the 2012 Caribbean Cup. He is currently the manager of the Saint Martin national team.

== Career ==
=== Early career ===
Darcheville was born in Sinnamary, French Guiana. He began his professional career in France at Rennes. He played his first game for Rennes in a 3–1 defeat to Monaco in 1995. He spent three seasons at Rennes, scoring five goals in 42 matches.

He then joined English Premier League club Nottingham Forest on loan for a season but failed to settle, scoring only two goals in 16 matches. He was still coming to terms with the death of his wife and children in a car accident in 1998.

=== Return to France ===
After a disappointing season in England, Darcheville decided to continue his career in France and joined Lorient. He spent three seasons with Lorient, scoring 44 goals in 102 matches, including the winning goal in the Coupe de France as Lorient beat Bastia 1–0. He was also on the losing side in the Coupe de la Ligue final as Lorient lost 3–0 to Bordeaux.

When Lorient were relegated from the top-flight Ligue 1, Darcheville joined Bordeaux. During the previous season, he had scored 19 goals in 32 matches for the doomed Lorient and his good form continued for Bordeaux, where he scored 11 league goals in his first season. Overall, he scored 37 goals in 131 league games and netted seven goals in European competition.

=== Rangers ===
Darcheville signed a two-year contract with Scottish side Rangers on 9 May 2007 to join the club on 1 July. He was signed by Walter Smith, after Rangers' two previous managers, Alex McLeish and Paul Le Guen, were also linked with him. Darcheville made his Rangers debut against Montenegrin side Zeta on 31 July 2007, in a 2–0 victory. He then went on to score his first and second goals for the club in a match against Falkirk on 18 August 2007.

On 12 December 2007, in Rangers' final "make-or-break" 2007–08 UEFA Champions League match against Lyon, Darcheville missed an open goal from five yards out and was later sent off for stamping on Kim Källström. He later received a three match suspension for this offence and missed the UEFA Cup third round tie against Panathinaikos (Rangers would eventually go through to the next round on the away goals rule after drawing 1–1 in Athens) and was also unavailable for the first leg of the last-16 clash with German side Werder Bremen. Darcheville did, however, score away from home in the next round against Sporting CP, and helped Rangers defeat Fiorentina to reach the final against Zenit Saint Petersburg. Rangers lost the final 2–0; the game was Darcheville's only full match for the club. Darcheville scored his first goal of the 2008–09 season, and his first in six months for Rangers, against Aberdeen on 22 November in a 2–0 win at Ibrox. This was to prove to be his last goal for the Ibrox club.

=== Later career ===
Darcheville left Rangers on 1 January 2009 to join Valenciennes in France.

On 7 August 2009, Nantes signed Darcheville on a free transfer until the end of the 2009–10 season.

On 28 August 2010, Darcheville signed a one-year contract for Kavala of Greece.

== Honours ==
Lorient

- Coupe de France: 2001–02

Bordeaux

- Coupe de la Ligue: 2006–07

Rangers

- Scottish Cup: 2007–08
- Scottish League Cup: 2007–08
- UEFA Cup runner-up: 2007–08
