= 2001–02 Coupe de France =

Tournament details
- Country: France
- Teams: 5,848

Final positions
- Champions: Lorient
- Runners-up: Bastia

Tournament statistics
- Top goal scorer(s): Pauleta; Tony Vairelles (4 goals)

The Coupe de France 2001–02 was its 85th edition. It was won by FC Lorient.

The cup winner qualified for First round of UEFA Cup.

== Round of 64 ==
Team 1	Score	Team 2
Bastia (D1)	3–1	Nantes (D1)
Troyes (D1)	0–0 (a.e.t.) (2–0 p)	Nice (D2)
Metz (D1)	5–0	Grenoble (D2)
Montpellier (D1)	3–2	Martigues (D2)
Boulogne (CFA)	1–5 (a.e.t.)	Sochaux (D1)
Valenciennes (CFA)	0–1	Lens (D1)
Vesoul (CFA)	2–3 (a.e.t.)	Monaco (D1)
Tours (CFA)	2–2 (a.e.t.) (1–4 p)	Guingamp (D1)
Saint-Priest (CFA)	0–0 (a.e.t.) (5–3 p)	Auxerre (D1)
Fréjus (CFA)	0–6	Bordeaux (D1)
Libourne-Saint-Seurin (CFA)	2–0	Lille (D1)
Balma (CFA)	0–1 (a.e.t.)	Rennes (D1)
Douai (CFA2)	1–3 (a.e.t.)	Lorient (D1)
Saint-Malo (CFA2)	0–6	Lyon (D1)
Chalon (CFA2)	2–3 (a.e.t.)	Sedan (D1)
Luçon (DH)	0–2	Paris Saint-Germain (D1)
Marseille (D1)	2–0	Saint-Leu (DHR)
Strasbourg (D2)	3–1	Le Mans (D2)
Nancy (D2)	3–1 (a.e.t.)	Niort (D2)
Le Havre (D2)	0–0 (a.e.t.) (3–5 p)	Nîmes (D2)
Louhans-Cuiseaux (Nat.)	1–0 (a.e.t.)	Saint-Étienne (D2)
Trélissac (CFA)	0–1	Amiens (D2)
Fontenay (CFA)	0–1	Laval (D2)
La Flèche (CFA2)	0–1	Châteauroux (D2)
Montagnarde (DH)	2–1 (a.e.t.)	Caen (D2)
Millau SO (DHR)	0–1	Ajaccio (D2)
Reims (Nat.)	1–0	RC France (Nat.)
La Roche (Nat.)	1–0 (a.e.t.)	Clermont (Nat.)
Creutzwald (CFA2)	0–0 (a.e.t.) (1–3 p)	Saint-Maur (Nat.)
Yzeure (CFA2)	2–1	Cannes (Nat.)
Aurillac (CFA)	1–3 (a.e.t.)	Changé (CFA2)
Issy-les-Moulineaux (DSR)	2–1 (a.e.t.)	Avion (CFA)

== Round of 32 ==
Team 1	Score	Team 2
Bastia (D1)	2–1 (a.e.t.)	Sochaux (D1)
Lens (D1)	0–1	Marseille (D1)
Monaco (D1)	2–1	Montpellier (D1)
Rennes (D1)	1–2	Lorient (D1)
Sedan (D1)	1–0	Ajaccio (D2)
Strasbourg (D2)	1–0 (a.e.t.)	Troyes (D1)
Lyon (D1)	0–2	Châteauroux (D2)
Saint-Maur (Nat.)	2–0	Bordeaux (D1
Louhans-Cuiseaux (Nat.)	2–0	Guingamp (D1)
Libourne-Saint-Seurin (CFA)	2–1 (a.e.t.)	Metz (D1)
Yzeure (CFA2)	0–1	Paris Saint-Germain (D1)
Laval (D2)	0–0 (a.e.t.) (3–5 p)	Nîmes (D2)
Saint-Priest (CFA)	0–2	Nancy (D2)
Issy-les-Moulineaux (DHR)	0–1	Amiens (D2)
Changé (CFA2)	0–3	Reims (Nat.)
Montagnarde (DH)	4–2	La Roche (Nat.)

== Round of 16 ==
Team 1	Score	Team 2
Paris Saint-Germain (D1)	1–1 (a.e.t.) (7–6 p)	Marseille (D1)
Montagnarde (DH)	0–1	Monaco (D1)
Amiens (D2)	0–2	Nîmes (D2)
Bastia (D1)	2–0	Nancy (D2)
Reims (Nat.)	1–1 (a.e.t.) (3–4 p)	Sedan (D1)
Louhans-Cuiseaux (Nat.)	2–2 (a.e.t.) (5–6 p)	Lorient (D1)
Strasbourg (D2)	2–1	Saint-Maur (Nat.)
Libourne-Saint-Seurin (CFA)	2–0	Châteauroux (D2)

== Quarter-finals ==
9 March 2002	Libourne-Saint-Seurin (4)	0–1 (a.e.t.)	Bastia (1)	Bordeaux
			Vairelles 111'	Stadium: Stade Chaban Delmas; Attendance: 16,552; Referee: Bertrand Layec

9 March 2002	Paris Saint-Germain (1)	0–1	Lorient (1)	Paris
			Chabert 32'	Stadium: Parc des Princes; Attendance: 19,794; Referee: Éric Poulat

9 March 2002	Sedan (1)	1–0	Strasbourg (2)	Sedan
	Asuar 32'			Stadium: Stade Louis Dugauguez; Attendance: 18,154; Referee: Gilles Veissière

10 March 2002	Nîmes (2)	1–1 (a.e.t.) (3–1 p)	Monaco (1)	Nîmes
	Charpenet 79'		Camara 34'	Stadium: Stade des Costières; Attendance: 19,503; Referee: Laurent Duhamel
	Penalties
	Charpenet (penalty scored); Talay (penalty scored); Jouffre (penalty scored)		(penalty missed) Márquez; (penalty scored) Carole; (penalty missed) Givet; (penalty missed) Bernardi

== Semi-finals ==
30 March 2002	Bastia (1)	1–0 (a.e.t.)	Sedan (1)	Bastia
	Vairelles 93'			Stadium: Stade Furiani; Attendance: 11,640; Referee: Stéphane Bré

30 March 2002	Lorient (1)	1–0	Nîmes (2)	Lorient
	Diop 76'			Stadium: Stade du Moustoir; Attendance: 10,280; Referee: Claude Colombo

== Final ==
11 May 2002
20:45

Bastia	0–1	Lorient
		Darcheville 41'

Stade de France, Saint-Denis
Attendance: 66,215
Referee: Éric Poulat

== Topscorer ==
Pauleta (4 goals)
Tony Vairelles (4 goals)
