= 2001–02 Coupe de la Ligue =

Football competition

French League Cup

Tournament details
- Country: France
- Dates: 1 September 2001 – 20 April 2002
- Teams: 43

Final positions
- Champions: Bordeaux (1st title)
- Runners-up: Lorient

Tournament statistics
- Matches played: 42
- Goals scored: 121 (2.88 per match)
- Top goal scorer: Danijel Ljuboja (5 goals)

The 2001–02 Coupe de la Ligue began on 1 September 2001 and the final took place on 20 April 2002 at the Stade de France. Lyon were the defending champions, but were knocked-out by Bordeaux in the Round of 16. Bordeaux went on to win the tournament, beating Lorient 3–0 in the final.

== First round ==
The matches were played on 1 September 2001.

Team 1	Score	Team 2
Le Havre	2–1	Wasquehal
Martigues	3–0	Toulouse
Le Mans	2–1	Nice
Laval	1–0	Beauvais
Saint-Étienne	2–0	Gueugnon
Amiens	2–1	Angers
Ajaccio	0–0 (a.e.t.) (3–4 p)	Nîmes
Créteil	4–2	Valence
Cannes	1–0	Grenoble
Louhans-Cuiseaux	2–0	Istres
Strasbourg	3–0	Niort

== Second round ==
The matches were played on 1 and 2 December 2001.

Team 1	Score	Team 2
Lyon	1–1 (a.e.t.) (4–3 p)	Sochaux
Lorient	5–4	Metz
Nantes	3–2 (a.e.t.)	Sedan
Le Mans	2–3	Bastia
Rennes	3–1	Créteil
Lille	0–2	Nancy
Guingamp	4–0	Saint-Étienne
Laval	0–3	Auxerre
Cannes	1–2	Bordeaux
Amiens	2–0	Nîmes
Louhans-Cuiseaux	0–1	Le Havre
Strasbourg	2–0	Caen
Châteauroux	2–1	Martigues
Monaco	4–1	Lens
Troyes	0–4	Paris Saint-Germain
Marseille	0–0 (a.e.t.) (4–2 p)	Montpellier

== Round of 16 ==
The matches were played on 8, 9 and 16 January 2002.

Team 1	Score	Team 2
Rennes	2–0	Le Havre
Nantes	1–3	Bastia
Amiens	0–2	Strasbourg
Paris Saint-Germain	3–1	Guingamp
Bordeaux	1–1 (a.e.t.) (4–2 p)	Lyon
Lorient	1–0	Auxerre
Monaco	2–1	Marseille
Nancy	3–2	Châteauroux

== Quarter-finals ==
The matches were played on 26 and 27 January 2002.

Team 1	Score	Team 2
Bordeaux	2–1	Monaco
Rennes	3–2	Strasbourg
Lorient	1–1 (a.e.t.) (4–2 p)	Bastia
Paris Saint-Germain	1–1 (a.e.t.) (4–3 p)	Nancy

== Semi-finals ==
The matches were played on 2 and 3 March 2002.

Team 1	Score	Team 2
Paris Saint-Germain	0–1	Bordeaux
Lorient	1–0	Rennes

== Final ==
The final was played on 20 April 2002 at the Stade de France.

20 April 2002
20:45

Bordeaux	3–0	Lorient
Pauleta 5', 59'; Meriem 42'

Stade de France, Saint-Denis
Attendance: 75,923
Referee: Alain Sars

== Topscorer ==
Danijel Ljuboja (5 goals)
