= FC Lorient =

Association football club in France

Lorient
- Full name: Football Club Lorient
- Nicknames: Les Merlus (The Merlucciidaes); Le FCL; Les tangos et noirs (The dark orange and black)
- Founded: 2 April 1926; 100 years ago
- Stadium: Stade du Moustoir
- Capacity: 18,110
- Owner: Black Knight Football Club
- President: Loïc Féry
- Head coach: Alexandre Dujeux
- League: Ligue 1
- 2025–26: Ligue 1, 10th of 18
- Website: www.fclorient.bzh
Home colours	Away colours	Third colours

Football Club Lorient (French pronunciation: [lɔʁjɑ̃ bʁətaɲ syd];), commonly referred to as FC Lorient (Breton: An Oriant), is a French professional association football club based in Lorient, Brittany. The club was founded in 1926 and currently competes in Ligue 1, having been promoted from Ligue 2 at the end of the 2024–25 season. Lorient plays its home matches at the Stade Yves Allainmat, named after the former mayor of Lorient. The stadium is surnamed Stade du Moustoir because of its location within the city.

Lorient had a relatively bleak history nationally before 1998 when the club made its first appearance in Ligue 1 in the 1998–99 season. Before that, Lorient spent most of its life as an amateur club. Lorient's achieved its biggest honour in 2002 when the club won the Coupe de France defeating Bastia 1–0 in the final. Lorient has never won Ligue 1, but has won the Championnat National earning this honour in 1995. Regionally, the club has won five Brittany Division d'Honneur titles and six Coupe de Bretagne.

Lorient has most notably served as a springboard club for several international players in recent years, including Laurent Koscielny, André-Pierre Gignac, Michaël Ciani, Kevin Gameiro, Karim Ziani, Bakari Koné, Matteo Guendouzi, and Seydou Keita. French international Yoann Gourcuff, the son of Christian Gourcuff, began his career at the club before moving to Derby Breton rivals Rennes.

== History ==
Football Club Lorient was founded on 2 April 1926. Lorient was formed off of La Marée Sportive, a club founded a year earlier by Madame Cuissard, a store patron who originated from Saint-Étienne, and her son Joseph. In 1929, The club began play as an amateur club under the Czechoslovak manager Jozef Loquay and won the Champions de l'Ouest, which placed the club into the Division d'Honneur of the Brittany region. In 1932, Lorient won the league and, four years later, repeated this performance. The onset of World War II limited the club's meteoric rise in the region and the departure of several players who either joined the war effort or left to play abroad effectively disseminated the club.

Following the war, Antoine Cuissard, the grandson of Madame Cuissard, joined the club as a player with intentions of rebuilding it in honour of his grandmother. Lorient began play in the Division d'Honneur. Cuissard began one of the first Lorient players to maintain a place in the France national team while playing with the club. In 1954, he played on the team that qualified for the 1954 FIFA World Cup. Lorient quickly recovered and, by 1948, was playing in the Championnat de France amateur (CFA). The club spent two years in the league before falling back to the Division d'Honneur. In 1957, Lorient was promoted back to the CFA, but struggled due to being limited financially. Subsequently, the club sought sponsors with the hopes of becoming professional. In 1967, under the chairmanship of both Jean Tomine and René Fougère, Lorient placed a bid to turn professional and was elected to Division 2 by the French League. Incoming president Henri Ducassou agreed to do his best to make professionalism prosper in Lorient.

In the second division, Lorient struggled in the early seventies to consistently stay up in the league table. In the 1974–75 and 1975–76 seasons, the club came close to promotion to Division 1, finishing 3rd in its group on each occasion, one place short of the promotion play-offs. However, the following season, Lorient was relegated to Division 3. The potential of that team had proved above its classification when the club qualified for its first French FA Cup quarter-finals in history. The club subsequently struggled financially and domestically. It went bankrupt in 1978. During this period, under the name "Club des Supporters du FC Lorient" (the supporters legally took over to keep the FC Lorient name alive), Lorient played in the Division Supérieure Régionale (sixth tier of the French football pyramid). In the early 1980s, Georges Guenoum took over the club as president and hired former Lorient player Christian Gourcuff as manager. Surprisingly, under Gourcuff, Lorient quickly climbed back up the French football ladder. In 1983, the club won the Brittany Division d'Honneur title and, the following season, won Division 4. In 1985, they won Division 3 and so were back in Division 2 eight years after their demise at that level! Gourcuff left the club after its first Division 2 campaign, with relegation only being effective through an unfavourable goal difference. Lorient spent the next five years in Division 3 playing under two managers. It went financially bust again in 1990 but was nevertheless allowed to stay in Division 3. In 1991, Gourcuff returned to the club and after almost a decade playing in Division 3, Lorient earned promotion back to Division 2 after winning the second edition of the Championnat National.

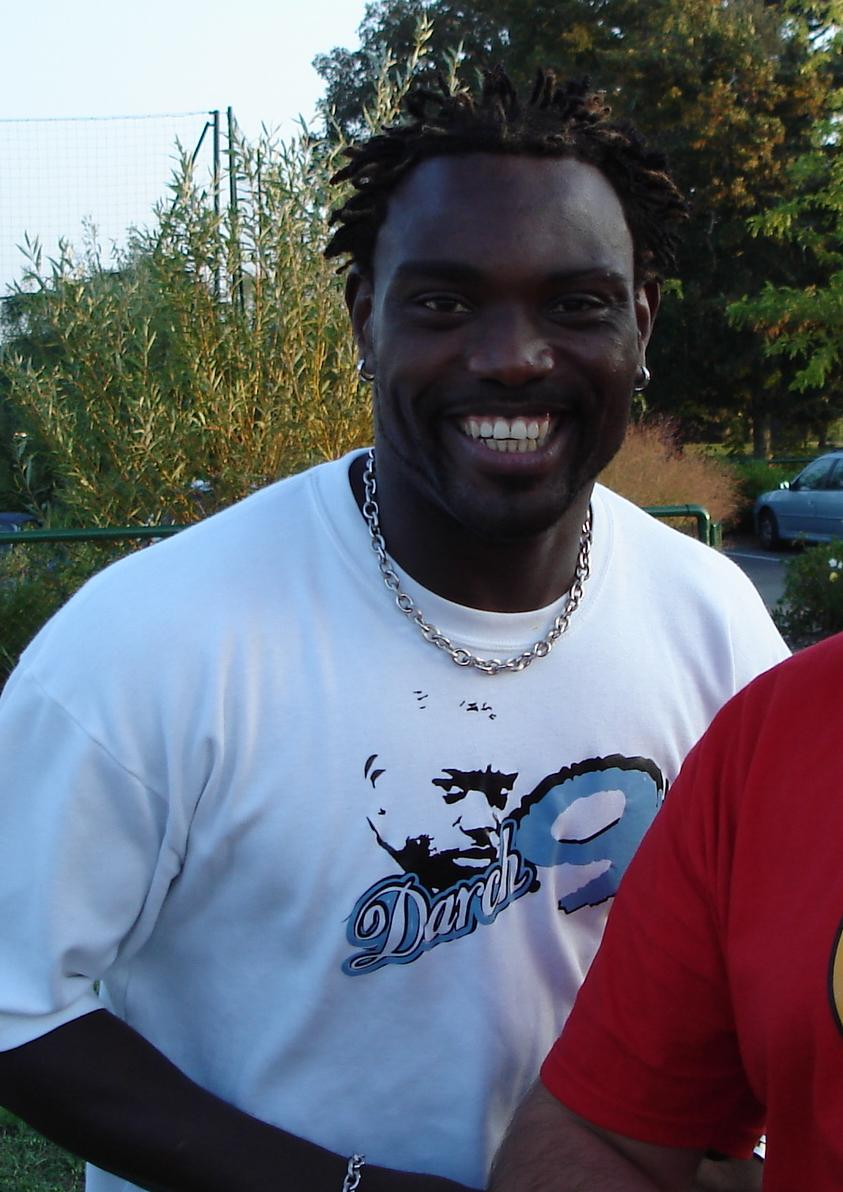
Jean-Claude Darcheville scored the game-winning goal for Lorient in the 2002 Coupe de France final.

Lorient spent two seasons in the second division and, in the 1997–98 season, surprised many by running away with the league alongside champions Nancy. The 1998–99 season marked Lorient's first appearance in Division 1 in the club's history. The appearance was brief with Lorient struggling to meet the financial demands and stronger competition of the league. The club finished in 16th place and were relegated. Amazingly, Lorient finished equal on points with Le Havre with both clubs having the same number of wins, losses, and draws. However, due to Le Havre having a better goal difference, Lorient was relegated. After only two seasons in Division 2, Lorient were back in the first division for the 2001–02 season. Before the promotion, in April 2001, a takeover of the club led by Alain Le Roch led to internal problems, which resulted in the departure of Gourcuff and one of the club's best players, Ulrich Le Pen, soon after. The club hired Argentine manager Ángel Marcos to replace Gourcuff. However, Marcos lasted only a few months.

Despite the initial issues, Lorient strengthened its squad in preparation for its return to the first division by recruiting players such as Pascal Delhommeau, Moussa Saïb, Johan Cavalli, and Pape Malick Diop. Led by Yvon Pouliquen, the new signings joined the likes of Jean-Claude Darcheville, Arnaud Le Lan, and Seydou Keita and surprised many by reaching the final of the Coupe de la Ligue. Lorient was defeated by Bordeaux in the final. Lorient continued its impressive cup form by winning the Coupe de France just two months later. In the match, Lorient faced Bastia and defeated the Corsicans 1–0 courtesy of a goal from Darcheville. The title was the club's first major honour. The celebration would however end on a sourer note as Lorient was relegated from league play in the same season. The club participated in the UEFA Cup the following season, falling to Turkish side Denizlispor in the first round on away goals.

Lorient returned to the first division, now called Ligue 1, in 2006 with a completely revamped team. Instead of spending money on players, the club focused its efforts on improving its academy and promoted several players to the first-team such as André-Pierre Gignac, Virgile Reset, Jérémy Morel, and Diego Yesso during the club's stint in Ligue 2. Lorient was also influenced by the arrival of the Malian international Bakari Koné. The club, in its return to Ligue 1, finished mid-table in three straight seasons. In the 2009–10 season, Lorient performed well domestically. In October 2009, the club reached 5th place in the table; its highest position that late in the season ever. Lorient eventually finished the campaign in 7th place; its best finish in Ligue 1.

In the 2016-2017 Ligue 1 season, Lorient played against Ligue 2 side Troyes in the promotion/relegation play off match. Lorient lost the tie 2–1 and were relegated to Ligue 2 after an 11 year stay in the top flight.

On 30 April 2020, Lorient were promoted to Ligue 1 after the LFP decided to end the seasons of both Ligue 1 and Ligue 2 early due to the Coronavirus pandemic. Lorient were top of the Ligue 2 table at the time of the decision. In the 2023–24 Ligue 1 season, Lorient were relegated back to Ligue 2 on goal difference. On the final day of the season, Lorient needed a five goal turnaround to avoid demotion. The club would achieve this beating already relegated Clermont but due to Metz having a better head to head record in the league against Lorient, they were sent down to the second division.

On 10 May 2025, Lorient was crowned Ligue 2 champion, returning to Ligue 1 one season after being relegated.

On 28 January 2026, Black Night Football Club become the sole shareholder of the club and becoming the second club fully owned by Black Night Football Club after AFC Bournemouth.

== Players ==
=== Current squad ===
As of 1 September 2026

Note: Flags indicate national team as defined under FIFA eligibility rules; some limited exceptions apply. Players may hold more than one non-FIFA nationality.

No.	Pos.	Nation	Player
1	GK	FRA	Benjamin Leroy
2	DF	FRA	Alec Georgen
3	DF	TUN	Montassar Talbi
5	DF	SEN	Formose Mendy
7	MF	FRA	Bandiougou Fadiga
8	MF	GLP	Noah Cadiou
9	FW	CIV	Mohamed Bamba
10	FW	DEN	Isak Jensen (on loan from AZ)
11	MF	FRA	Théo Le Bris
15	FW	BEN	Aiyegun Tosin
17	MF	FRA	Jean-Victor Makengo
18	FW	FRA	Ibrahima Baldé (on loan from Rodez)
19	FW	SEN	Souleymane Faye (on loan from Sporting)
20	DF	GUI	Dembo Sylla

No.	Pos.	Nation	Player
21	GK	SEN	Bingourou Kamara
23	MF	POR	Daniel Semedo
30	DF	SLO	Srđan Kuzmić
32	DF	GHA	Nathaniel Adjei
33	MF	FRA	Gabin Bernardeau
38	GK	SUI	Yvon Mvogo
42	FW	CIV	Mamadou Koné
43	DF	BFA	Arsène Kouassi
55	DF	ITA	Nosa Edward Obaretin (on loan from Napoli)
62	MF	CMR	Arthur Avom
72	MF	COD	Noah Mbamba (on loan from Bayer Leverkusen)
77	MF	GRE	Panos Katseris
95	DF	FRA	Isaak Touré

=== Out on loan ===
Note: Flags indicate national team as defined under FIFA eligibility rules; some limited exceptions apply. Players may hold more than one non-FIFA nationality.

No.	Pos.	Nation	Player
—	DF	FRA	Enzo Genton (on loan to Amiens)
—	DF	FRA	Isaac Monnier (on loan to Bastia)

No.	Pos.	Nation	Player
—	MF	FRA	Jérémy Hatchi (on loan to Montpellier)

=== Former players ===
For a complete list of FC Lorient players with a Wikipedia article, see Category:FC Lorient players

== Management and staff ==
=== Club officials ===
Senior club staff

- President: Loïc Féry
- General Director: Arnaud Tanguy, Tim Bezbatchenko
- Sporting Director: Laurent Koscielny
- Sports coordinator: Aziz Mady Mogne
- Head coach: Alexandre Dujeux
- Assistant head coach: Ingo Goetze, Lamine Mbaye, Romain Hequet, Jérémy Morel
- Goalkeeper coach: Olivier Lagarde, Ronald Thomas
- Scout: Roland Itoua, Nicolas Flégeau, Valentin Trouiller, Elie Kroupi
- Club doctor: Vincent Detaille
- Medical Director Physiotherapy: Régis Bouyaux

=== Coaching history ===
Dates	Name
1929–32	Jozef Loquay
19??	Alex Bohm
1946–48	Jean Snella
1948–51	Marcel Lisieiro
1951–52	Robert Hennequin
1952–59	Georges Girot
1959	Antoine Cuissard
1960	Lucien Philipot
1961–67	Daniel Carpentier
1967–68	Antoine Cuissard
1968–69	Yves Boutet
1969–71	Émile Rummelhardt
1971–72	André Mori
1972–76	Jean Vincent
1977–78	Louis Hon
1978–79	Paul Le Bellec
1979–81	Bernard Goueffic

Dates	Name
1981–82	Louis Lagadec
1982–86	Christian Gourcuff
1986–88	Michel Le Calloch
1988–90	Alain Thiboult
1990–91	Patrick Le Pollotec
1 July 1991 – 30 June 2001	Christian Gourcuff
1 July 2001 – 1 December 2001	Ángel Marcos
1 July 2001 – 30 June 2003	Yvon Pouliquen
1 July 2003 – 25 May 2014	Christian Gourcuff
25 May 2014 – 23 October 2016	Sylvain Ripoll
8 November 2016 – 29 May 2017	Bernard Casoni
30 May 2017 – 28 May 2019	Mickaël Landreau
29 May 2019 – 25 June 2022	Christophe Pélissier
1 July 2022 – 22 June 2024	Régis Le Bris
2 July 2024 – 17 May 2026	Olivier Pantaloni
9 June 2026 –	Alexandre Dujeux

== Honours ==
=== Domestic ===
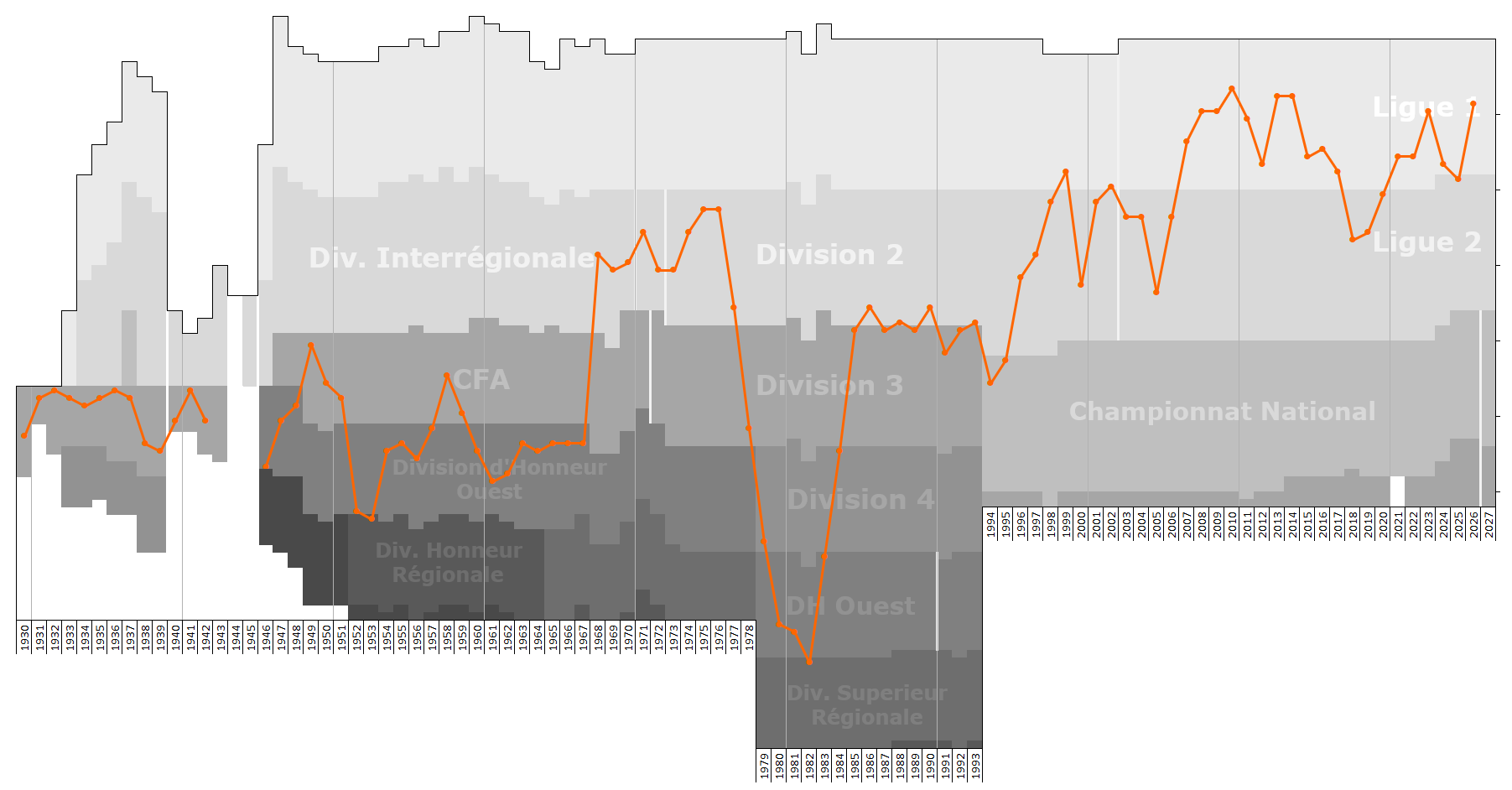
Historical league performance chart of FC Lorient

- Ligue 2
  - Champions: 2019–20, 2024–25
- Championnat National
  - Champions: 1994–95
- Coupe de France
  - Champions: 2001–02
- Coupe de la Ligue
  - Runners-up: 2001–02
- Trophée des Champions
  - Runners-up: 2002

=== Regional ===
- Division d'Honneur (Bretagne)
  - Champions (5): 1932, 1936, 1957, 1983, 1995
- Coupe de Bretagne
  - Champions (6): 1958, 1970, 1982, 1990, 2000, 2002

=== European football ===
FC Lorient in Europe
Season	Competition	Round	Country	Club	Home	Away	Aggregate
2002–03	UEFA Cup	First round	(Turkey)	Denizlispor	3–1	0–2	3–3 (a)
