= 2002–03 SC Bastia season =

SC Bastia
2002–03 season
- Chairman: François Nicolaï
- Manager: Gérard Gili
- Stadium: Stade Armand Cesari
- Ligue 1: 12th
- Coupe de France: End of 64
- Coupe de la Ligue: End of 32
- Top goalscorer: League: Florian Maurice (10); All: Florian Maurice (10)
- Highest home attendance: 10,055 vs AS Monaco (17 August 2002)
- Lowest home attendance: 5,747 vs Guingamp (16 November 2002)
- Average home league attendance: 7,579
Home colours	Away colours

French football club SC Bastia's 2002–03 season. Finished 12th place in league. Top scorer of the season, including 10 goals in 10 league matches have been Florian Maurice. Was eliminated to Coupe de France end of 64, the Coupe de la Ligue was able to be among the final 32 teams.

== Transfers ==
=== In ===
Summer

- Hassan Ahamada from Nantes
- Jocelyn Gourvennec from Rennes
- Samir Beloufa from G. Beerschot
- Anthar Yahia from Inter
- Florian Maurice from Celta Vigo
- Paul Essola from Créteil
- Benjamin Longue from Bastia B team
- Chaouki Ben Saada from Bastia B team
- Nicolas Alnoudji from Çaykur Rizespor
- Lilian Laslandes from Sunderland

Winter

- Laurent Batlles from Rennes
- Franck Silvestre from Montpellier
- Grégory Vignal from Liverpool
- Philippe Billy from Lecce

=== Out ===
Summer

- Stéphane Odet to Beauvais
- Benjamin Ajiboye to EP Manosque
- Pierre Deblock to Auxerre
- Patrick Beneforti to Udinese
- Tony Vairelles to Lyon
- Damian Manso to Newell's Old Boys
- Daniel Popovic to NK Osijek
- Ishmael Addo to Maccabi Netanya
- Christophe Deguerville to free
- Ousmane Soumah to retired
- Lilian Nalis to Chievo

Winter

- Prince Daye to Club Africain
- Cyril Jeunechamp to Rennes
- Nicolas Dieuze to Toulouse
- Reynald Pedros to Maccabi Nazareth
- Fabrice Jau to St. Etienne
- Bernard Lambourde to Nancy
- Price Jolibois to Beauvais

== Squad ==
As of 27 May 2012

Note: Flags indicate national team as defined under FIFA eligibility rules; some limited exceptions apply. Players may hold more than one non-FIFA nationality.

No.	Pos.	Nation	Player
1	GK	(France) FRA	Nicolas Penneteau
2	DF	(France) FRA	Patrick Moreau
3	DF	(Guinea) GUI	Morlaye Soumah
4	DF	(France) FRA	Cédric Uras
5	DF	(Brazil) BRA	Demetrius Ferreira
6	MF	(France) FRA	Reynald Pedros
7	MF	(France) FRA	Cyril Jeunechamp
7	MF	(France) FRA	Laurent Batlles
8	MF	(Cameroon) CMR	Paul Essola
9	FW	(France) FRA	Lilian Laslandes
10	MF	(France) FRA	Jocelyn Gourvennec
11	FW	(France) FRA	Hassan Ahamada
12	MF	(France) FRA	Sébastien Piocelle
13	DF	(France) FRA	Grégory Vignal
14	MF	(France) FRA	Frédéric Mendy
15	MF	(France) FRA	Nicolas Dieuze
16	GK	(Tunisia) TUN	Ali Boumnijel

No.	Pos.	Nation	Player
17	MF	(France) FRA	Franck Matingou
18	FW	(France) FRA	Prince Daye
19	FW	(France) FRA	Florian Maurice
20	MF	(France) FRA	Fabrice Jau
21	DF	(Algeria) ALG	Anthar Yahia
22	DF	(Algeria) ALG	Samir Beloufa
23	DF	(Algeria) ALG	Adel Guemari
23	MF	(France) FRA	Price Jolibois
24	DF	(France) FRA	Franck Silvestre
25	MF	(Ghana) GHA	Michael Essien
26	MF	(Cameroon) CMR	Nicolas Alnoudji
27	DF	(New Caledonia) NCL	Benjamin Longue
28	DF	(United States) USA	Greg Vanney
29	MF	(Tunisia) TUN	Chaouki Ben Saada
30	GK	(France) FRA	Arnaud Paoli
—	MF	(France) FRA	Samir Bertin d'Avesnes
—	FW	(Ivory Coast) CIV	Hervé Guy

== Ligue 1 ==
=== League table ===
Pos	Team	Pld	W	D	L	GF	GA	GD	Pts	Qualification or relegation
10	Nice	38	13	16	9	39	31	+8	55	Qualification to Intertoto Cup second round
11	Paris Saint-Germain	38	14	12	12	47	36	+11	54	
12	Bastia	38	12	11	15	40	48	−8	47	
13	Strasbourg	38	11	12	15	40	54	−14	45	
14	Lille	38	10	12	16	29	44	−15	42	

Source: Ligue 1
Rules for classification: 1) points; 2) goal difference; 3) number of goals scored.

=== Results summary ===
Overall								Home						Away					
Pld	W	D	L	GF	GA	GD	Pts	W	D	L	GF	GA	GD	W	D	L	GF	GA	GD
38	12	11	15	40	48	−8	47	10	5	4	28	17	+11	2	6	11	12	31	−19

Source: LFP

=== Results by round ===
Round	1	2	3	4	5	6	7	8	9	10	11	12	13	14	15	16	17	18	19	20	21	22	23	24	25	26	27	28	29	30	31	32	33	34	35	36	37	38
Ground	H	A	H	A	H	A	H	A	H	A	H	A	H	A	H	A	H	H	A	H	A	H	A	H	A	H	A	H	A	H	A	H	A	H	A	A	H	A
Result	D	L	W	L	W	L	L	D	W	L	W	L	W	L	L	D	W	L	L	W	D	W	W	W	D	W	W	D	L	D	D	D	L	L	L	D	D	L
Position	12	14	11	15	11	12	15	15	12	14	12	13	13	14	15	14	14	15	15	14	15	13	13	11	10	10	9	9	11	11	11	12	12	12	12	12	12	12

Source: LFP
A = Away; H = Home; W = Win; D = Draw; L = Loss

=== Matches ===
Date	Opponent	H / A	Result	Goal(s)	Attendance	Referee
3 August 2002	Lens	H	1 - 1	Essien 61', Maurice (yellow card) 89' (red card)	9,139	Alain Sars
10 August 2002	Nantes	A	1 - 0		34,336	Claude Colombo
17 August 2002	AS Monaco	H	1 - 0	Maurice (yellow card) 59' (yellow-red card) , Prince 67'	10,055	Bertrand Layec
24 August 2002	Lyon	A	4 - 1	Ahamada 23'	38,777	Stéphane Bré
31 August 2002	Rennes	H	3 - 1	Gourvennec 12', Ahamada 22' - (yellow card) 42' (yellow-red card) , Maurice 70'	6,758	Bruno Coué
11 September 2002	Auxerre	A	1 - 0	Uras (yellow card) 88' (yellow-red card)	7,461	Éric Poulat
15 September 2002	Ajaccio	H	1 - 2	Laslandes 27'	8,488	Gilles Veissière
22 September 2002	Paris SG	A	1 - 1	Laslandes 56'	36,169	Laurent Duhamel
28 September 2002	Bordeaux	H	2 - 1	Maurice 15' (pen.), Laslandes 62'	7,167	Stéphane Moulin
5 October 2002	Nice	A	2 - 0		13,060	Damien Ledentu
19 October 2002	Le Havre	H	3 - 1	F. Mendy 2', Maurice 5', Gourvennec 57'	6,018	Thierry Auriac
26 October 2002	Strasbourg	A	2 - 0	Yahia (red card) 29'	11,134	Ameziane Khendek
2 November 2002	Lille	H	1 - 0	Laslandes 24'	6,278	Pascal Garibian
9 November 2002	Troyes	A	3 - 0	Jeunechamp (red card) 79'	10,424	Hervé Piccirillo
16 November 2002	Guingamp	H	0 - 2		5,747	Philippe Kalt
23 November 2002	Montpellier	A	2 - 2	Essien 51', Uras 82'	10,304	Stéphane Moulin
30 November 2002	Marseille	H	2 - 0	Ben Saada 74', 86'	9,008	Damien Ledentu
4 December 2002	Sedan	H	0 - 1		7,219	Bruno Derrien
14 December 2002	Sochaux	A	2 - 0		10,934	Gilles Veissière
20 December 2002	Nantes	H	3 - 1	Batlles 34', Essien 73', Laslandes 86'	7,706	Éric Poulat
11 January 2003	AS Monaco	A	0 - 0		5,632	Bruno Derrien
15 January 2003	Lyon	H	2 - 0	Essien 65', Maurice 80'	6,516	Pascal Viléo
22 January 2003	Rennes	A	0 - 1	Ben Saada 57'	14,624	Patrick Lhermite
29 January 2003	Auxerre	H	2 - 0	Silvestre 69', Maurice 80'	6,506	Bruno Coué
1 February 2003	Ajaccio	A	1 - 1	Silvestre 76'	7,910	Stéphane Bré
5 February 2003	Paris SG	H	1 - 0	Maurice 37'	8,065	Alain Sars
8 February 2003	Bordeaux	A	0 - 2	Essien 20', Laslandes 52'	26,862	Gilles Veissière
22 February 2003	Nice	H	1 - 1	Maurice 45'	9,165	Bertrand Layec
1 March 2003	Le Havre	A	2 - 0		10,659	Stéphane Lannoy
8 March 2003	Strasbourg	H	1 - 1	Batlles 14'	7,262	Claude Colombo
22 March 2003	Lille	A	1 - 1	Essien 88'	13,737	Bruno Ruffray
5 April 2003	Troyes	H	1 - 1	Maurice 39' (pen.)	7,448	Stéphane Lannoy
12 April 2003	Guingamp	A	3 - 0	Essien (yellow card) 79' (yellow-red card)	15,548	Jean-Marc Bonnin
19 April 2003	Montpellier	H	1 - 2	Maurice 69'	7,522	Gilles Veissière
3 May 2003	Marseille	A	2 - 1	Penneteau (red card) 27', Batlles 88'	55,356	Hervé Piccirillo
10 May 2003	Sedan	A	2 - 2	Batlles 9', Maurice 35' (pen.)	21,982	Claude Colombo
20 May 2003	Sochaux	H	2 - 2	Laslandes 18', 61'	7,943	Pascal Garibian
24 May 2003	Lens	A	2 - 0		37,988	Jean-Marc Bonnin

== Coupe de France ==
Date	Round	Opponent	H / A	Result	Goal(s)	Attendance	Referee
4 January 2003	End of 64	Marseille	A	[ 2 - 0]		35,000	Alain Sars

== Coupe de la Ligue ==
Date	Round	Opponent	H / A	Result	Goal(s)	Attendance	Referee
7 December 2002	End of 32	Lyon	A	2 - 0		26,332	Claude Colombo

== Statistics ==
=== Top scorers ===
As of 26 May 2012

Place	Position	Nation	Name	Ligue 1	Coupe de France	Coupe de la Ligue	Total
1	FW	(France)	Florian Maurice	10	0	0	10
2	FW	(France)	Lilian Laslandes	8	0	0	8
3	MF	(Ghana)	Michael Essien	6	0	0	6
4	MF	(France)	Laurent Batlles	4	0	0	4
5	MF	(Tunisia)	Chaouki Ben Saada	3	0	0	3
6	FW	(France)	Hassan Ahamada	2	0	0	2
=	DF	(France)	Franck Silvestre	2	0	0	2
=	MF	(France)	Jocelyn Gourvennec	2	0	0	2
9	MF	(France)	Prince Daye	1	0	0	1
=	MF	(France)	Frédéric Mendy	1	0	0	1
=	DF	(France)	Cédric Uras	1	0	0	1

=== League top assists ===
As of 26 May 2012

Place	Position	Nation	Name	Assists
1	MF	(France)	Jocelyn Gourvennec	5
=	MF	(France)	Laurent Batlles	5
3	FW	(France)	Florian Maurice	4
=	DF	(Brazil)	Demetrius Ferreira	4
5	MF	(Tunisia)	Chaouki Ben Saada	3
=	FW	(France)	Lilian Laslandes	3
7	MF	(France)	Cyril Jeunechamp	2
=	FW	(France)	Hassan Ahamada	2
=	MF	(France)	Reynald Pedros	2
10	DF	(France)	Grégory Vignal	1
=	DF	(France)	Philippe Billy	1
=	MF	(France)	Fabrice Jau	1
=	MF	(Ghana)	Michael Essien	1
=	MF	(France)	Sébastien Piocelle	1
