= 2001–02 SC Bastia season =

SC Bastia
2001–02 season
- Chairman: François Nicolaï
- Manager: Robert Nouzaret
- Stadium: Stade Armand Cesari
- Division 1: 11th
- Coupe de France: Final
- Coupe de la Ligue: Quarter final
- UEFA Intertoto Cup: Second round
- Top goalscorer: League: Tony Vairelles (14); All: Tony Vairelles (19)
- Highest home attendance: 11,333 vs Marseille (25 August 2001)
- Lowest home attendance: 5,508 vs Nantes (5 January 2002)
- Average home league attendance: 7,210
| Home colours | Away colours |

In 2001–02 season, the French football club SC Bastia finished at the 11th place in league. The top scorer of the season, including 19 goals in 14 league matches have been Tony Vairelles. Bastia were eliminated to Coupe de France final, and in the Coupe de la Ligue it was able to make the quarter-final, and the UEFA Intertoto Cup second round.

== Transfers ==
=== In ===
Summer

- Patrick Beneforti from Bastia B
- Pierre Deblock and Cyril Jeunechamp from Auxerre
- Nicolas Dieuze, Reynald Pedros, Fabrice Jau and Cédric Uras from Toulouse
- Anthar Yahia from Inter
- Bernard Lambourde from Portsmouth
- Price Jolibois from Red Star 93
- Tony Vairelles from Lyon
- Damián Manso from Newell's Old Boys

Winter

- Daniel Popovic from free
- Ishmael Addo from Hearts of Oak
- Greg Vanney from Los Angeles Galaxy

=== Out ===
Summer

- Eric Durand to Rennes
- Patrick Moreau to Metz
- Laurent Casanova to retired
- Pierre-Yves André to Nantes
- José Clayton to Stade Tunisien
- Patrick Valery to Aris Thessaloniki
- Piotr Świerczewski to Marseille
- Yann Lachuer to Auxerre
- David Faderne to Caen
- Cyril Domoraud to AS Monaco
- Frédéric Née to Lyon
- Pierre Laurent to Strasbourg

Winter

- No.

== Squad ==
As of 26 June 2012

Note: Flags indicate national team as defined under FIFA eligibility rules; some limited exceptions apply. Players may hold more than one non-FIFA nationality.

| No. | Pos. | Nation | Player |
|---|---|---|---|
| 1 | GK | (France) FRA | Nicolas Penneteau |
| 2 | DF | (France) FRA | Bernard Lambourde |
| 3 | DF | (Guinea) GUI | Morlaye Soumah |
| 4 | DF | (Brazil) BRA | Demetrius Ferreira |
| 5 | DF | (France) FRA | Christophe Deguerville |
| 6 | MF | (France) FRA | Lilian Nalis |
| 7 | MF | (France) FRA | Cyril Jeunechamp (captain) |
| 8 | FW | (Denmark) DEN | Dan Petersen |
| 9 | FW | (France) FRA | Tony Vairelles (on loan from Lyon) |
| 10 | MF | (France) FRA | Fabrice Jau |
| 11 | FW | (France) FRA | Nicolas Dieuze |
| 12 | DF | (France) FRA | Cédric Uras |
| 13 | MF | (France) FRA | Reynald Pedros |
| 14 | DF | (France) FRA | Frédéric Mendy |
| 15 | MF | (Argentina) ARG | Damián Manso (on loan from Newell's Old Boys) |
| 16 | GK | (Tunisia) TUN | Ali Boumnijel |
| 17 | MF | (Democratic Republic of the Congo) COD | Franck Matingou |

| No. | Pos. | Nation | Player |
|---|---|---|---|
| 18 | FW | (Liberia) LBR | Prince Daye |
| 19 | MF | (France) FRA | Stéphane Odet |
| 20 | MF | (France) FRA | Pierre Deblock |
| 21 | DF | (France) FRA | Antar Yahia (on loan from Inter Milan) |
| 22 | FW | (France) FRA | Cyril Eboki Poh |
| 25 | MF | (Ghana) GHA | Michael Essien |
| 26 | MF | (France) FRA | Sébastien Piocelle |
| 27 | FW | (Guinea) GUI | Ousmane Soumah |
| 28 | MF | (France) FRA | Patrick Beneforti |
| 29 | FW | (Croatia) CRO | Danijel Popović (on loan from Vukovar '91) |
| 30 | GK | (France) FRA | Jacques Leglib |
| 31 | GK | (France) FRA | Fabien Audard |
| 32 | MF | (France) FRA | Chaouki Ben Saada |
| 35 | FW | (Ghana) GHA | Ishmael Addo (on loan from Hearts of Oak) |
| 36 | DF | (United States) USA | Greg Vanney (on loan from LA Galaxy) |
| — | MF | (France) FRA | Jean-Christophe Lamberti |

== Division 1 ==
=== League table ===
| Pos | Team | Pld | W | D | L | GF | GA | GD | Pts |
|---|---|---|---|---|---|---|---|---|---|
| 9 | Marseille | 34 | 11 | 11 | 12 | 34 | 39 | −5 | 44 |
| 10 | Nantes | 34 | 12 | 7 | 15 | 35 | 41 | −6 | 43 |
| 11 | Bastia | 34 | 12 | 5 | 17 | 38 | 44 | −6 | 41 |
| 12 | Rennes | 34 | 11 | 8 | 15 | 40 | 51 | −11 | 41 |
| 13 | Montpellier | 34 | 9 | 13 | 12 | 28 | 31 | −3 | 40 |

Source: Ligue 1
Rules for classification: 1) points; 2) goal difference; 3) number of goals scored.

=== Results summary ===
| Overall | | | | | | | | Home | | | | | | Away | | | | | |
| Pld | W | D | L | GF | GA | GD | Pts | W | D | L | GF | GA | GD | W | D | L | GF | GA | GD |
|---|---|---|---|---|---|---|---|---|---|---|---|---|---|---|---|---|---|---|---|
| 34 | 12 | 5 | 17 | 38 | 44 | −6 | 41 | 9 | 1 | 7 | 25 | 15 | +10 | 3 | 4 | 10 | 13 | 29 | −16 |

Source: LFP

=== Results by round ===
| Round | 1 | 2 | 3 | 4 | 5 | 6 | 7 | 8 | 9 | 10 | 11 | 12 | 13 | 14 | 15 | 16 | 17 | 18 | 19 | 20 | 21 | 22 | 23 | 24 | 25 | 26 | 27 | 28 | 29 | 30 | 31 | 32 | 33 | 34 |
|---|---|---|---|---|---|---|---|---|---|---|---|---|---|---|---|---|---|---|---|---|---|---|---|---|---|---|---|---|---|---|---|---|---|---|
| Ground | H | A | H | A | H | A | H | A | H | A | H | A | H | A | H | A | H | H | A | H | A | H | A | H | A | H | A | H | A | H | A | H | A | A |
| Result | D | L | L | W | W | W | L | L | W | L | L | L | W | L | L | L | W | W | D | L | D | L | L | W | D | W | L | L | D | W | L | W | L | W |
| Position | 7 | 14 | 16 | 11 | 9 | 7 | 7 | 8 | 7 | 9 | 11 | 13 | 9 | 11 | 14 | 15 | 13 | 11 | 13 | 13 | 11 | 13 | 14 | 14 | 14 | 13 | 13 | 13 | 14 | 13 | 14 | 13 | 14 | 11 |

Source: LFP
A = Away; H = Home; W = Win; D = Draw; L = Loss

=== Matches ===
| Date | Opponent | H / A | Result | Goal(s) | Attendance | Referee |
|---|---|---|---|---|---|---|
| 28 July 2001 | Sedan | H | 1 - 1 | Beneforti 83' | 6,500 | Bertrand Layec |
| 4 August 2001 | Guingamp | A | 1 - 0 | - | 10,268 | Thierry Auriac |
| 12 August 2001 | Lyon | H | 1 - 2 | Ferreira 71' (pen.) | 8,512 | Gilles Veissière |
| 18 August 2001 | Nantes | A | 1 - 2 | Essien 13', Dieuze 29' | 33,507 | Hervé Piccirillo |
| 25 August 2001 | Marseille | H | 1 - 0 | Beneforti 34' | 11,333 | Damien Ledentu |
| 8 September 2001 | Metz | A | 0 - 1 | Deblock 20', Essien (yellow card) 90+1' (yellow-red card) | 15,252 | Bruno Derrien |
| 15 September 2001 | Auxerre | H | 0 - 1 | - | 7,739 | Patrick Lhermite |
| 22 September 2001 | Lille | A | 2 - 1 | Jau 64' | 16,565 | Franck Glochon |
| 29 September 2001 | AS Monaco | H | 1 - 0 | Beneforti 31', Penneteau (red card) 70' | 6,766 | Éric Poulat |
| 13 October 2001 | Sochaux | A | 4 - 1 | Lambourde (yellow card) 55' (yellow-red card) , Ferreira 82' | 16,090 | Ameziane Khendek |
| 20 October 2001 | Rennes | H | 1 - 2 | Ferreira 87' | 5,796 | Stéphane Moulin |
| 27 October 2001 | Paris SG | A | 1 - 0 | - | 40,879 | Thierry Auriac |
| 3 November 2001 | Lorient | H | 3 - 1 | Vairelles 55' (pen.), 56', Essien 68' | 5,766 | Bruno Coué |
| 17 November 2001 | Montpellier | A | 2 - 1 | Lambourde 78' | 11,300 | Alain Sars |
| 24 November 2001 | Bordeaux | H | 1 - 2 | Vairelles 62' | 6,068 | Laurent Duhamel |
| 28 November 2001 | Lens | A | 7 - 0 | Ferreira (yellow card) 45' (yellow-red card) | 34,280 | Patrick Lhermite |
| 8 December 2001 | Troyes | H | 2 - 0 | Vairelles 48', O. Soumah 50' | 6,710 | Hervé Piccirillo |
| 19 December 2001 | Guingamp | H | 3 - 0 | Vairelles 62' (pen.), Essien 63', Dieuze (red card) 67', Bourdeau 86' (o.g.) | 6,649 | (Luxembourg) Alain Hamer |
| 16 January 2002 | Lyon | A | 0 - 0 | - | 29,506 | (Switzerland) Massimo Busacca |
| 5 January 2002 | Nantes | H | 0 - 2 | - | 5,508 | Jean-Marc Bonnin |
| 12 January 2002 | Marseille | A | 2 - 2 | Dieuze 55', Essien 69' | 47,129 | Philippe Kalt |
| 23 January 2002 | Metz | H | 1 - 2 | Vairelles 60' | 5,554 | Pascal Viléo |
| 30 January 2002 | Auxerre | A | 1 - 0 | Piocelle (yellow card) 39' (yellow-red card) | 7,165 | Hervé Piccirillo |
| 2 February 2002 | Lille | H | 1 - 0 | Beneforti 54', Jeunechamp (yellow card) 85' (yellow-red card) | 5,971 | Stéphane Bré |
| 6 February 2002 | AS Monaco | A | 1 - 1 | Vairelles 33' (pen.) | 6,016 | Jean-Marc Bonnin |
| 16 February 2002 | Sochaux | H | 3 - 0 | Nalis 15', Vairelles 54', 70' | 5,786 | Patrick Lhermite |
| 23 February 2002 | Rennes | A | 2 - 1 | Vairelles 32' (pen.), Essien (yellow card) 68' (yellow-red card) | 18,638 | Stéphane Moulin |
| 6 March 2002 | Paris SG | H | 0 - 1 | F. Mendy (yellow card) 90+2' (yellow-red card) | 9,283 | Claude Colombo |
| 16 March 2002 | Lorient | A | 0 - 0 | M. Soumah (yellow card) 90' (yellow-red card) | 10,977 | Hervé Piccirillo |
| 23 March 2002 | Montpellier | H | 3 - 0 | Manso 20', Vairelles 24' (pen.), Jau 89' | 7,704 | Franck Glochon |
| 6 April 2002 | Bordeaux | A | 2 - 1 | Jeunechamp 86' | 29,345 | Jean-Marc Bonnin |
| 13 April 2002 | Lens | H | 3 - 1 | Prince 66', Jau 81', Vairelles 89' | 10,925 | Damien Ledentu |
| 27 April 2002 | Troyes | A | 3 - 0 | - | 15,795 | Ameziane Khendek |
| 4 May 2002 | Sedan | A | 0 - 2 | Vairelles 56', 64' | 21,228 | Dominique Fraise |

== Coupe de France ==
| Date | Round | Opponent | H / A | Result | Goal(s) | Attendance | Referee |
|---|---|---|---|---|---|---|---|
| 15 December 2001 | End of 64 | Nantes | H | [ 3 - 1] | Manso 32', 69', Vairelles 53' (pen.) | 2,032 | Stéphane Moulin |
| 19 January 2002 | End of 32 | Sochaux | H | [ 2 - 1] (a.e.t.) | Vairelles 60', Beneforti 112' | 3,670 | Pascal Garibian |
| 9 February 2002 | End of 16 | Nancy | H | [ 2 - 0] | Beneforti 20', O. Soumah 90+2' | 3,394 | Éric Poulat |
| 9 March 2002 | Quarter-final | Libourne | A | [ 0 - 1] (a.e.t.) | Vairelles 111' | 16,552 | Bertrand Layec |
| 30 March 2002 | Semi-final | Sedan | H | [ 1 - 0] (a.e.t.) | Vairelles 95' | 11,640 | Stéphane Bré |
| 20 April 2002 | Final | Lorient | N | [ 0 - 1] | - | 66,215 | Éric Poulat |

== Coupe de la Ligue ==
| Date | Round | Opponent | H / A | Result | Goal(s) | Attendance | Referee |
|---|---|---|---|---|---|---|---|
| 1 December 2001 | End of 32 | Le Mans | A | 2 - 3 | Beneforti 50', Dieuze 53', Essien 88' | 4,141 | Bruno Derrien |
| 8 January 2002 | End of 16 | Nantes | A | 1 - 3 | Deguerville 42', Nalis 83', Vairelles 90' | 9,891 | Bertrand Layec |
| 27 January 2002 | Quarter-final | Lorient | A | 1 - 1 (pen. 4-2) | Lambourde 57', M. Soumah (red card) 75' | 7,617 | Claude Colombo |

== UEFA Intertoto Cup ==
30 June 2001
17:00
Second round (1. match)

| Slaven Belupo (Croatia) | 1–0 | (France) Bastia |
|---|---|---|
| Dodik 7' | Report |

Gradski stadion, Koprivnica
Attendance: 3,500
Referee: Franz-Xaver Wack (Germany)

7 July 2001
20:00
Second round (2. match)

| Bastia (France) | 0–1 | (Croatia) Slaven Belupo |
|---|---|---|
| | Report | Dodik 12' |

Stade Armand Cesari, Bastia
Attendance: 3,660
Referee: Petteri Kari (Finland)

Slaven Belupo won 2–0 on aggregate.

== Statistics ==
=== Top scorers ===
As of 25 June 2012

| Place | Position | Nation | Name | Ligue 1 | Coupe de France | Coupe de la Ligue | Intertoto Cup | Total |
|---|---|---|---|---|---|---|---|---|
| 1 | FW | (France) | Tony Vairelles | 14 | 4 | 1 | 0 | 19 |
| 2 | MF | (France) | Patrick Beneforti | 4 | 2 | 1 | 0 | 7 |
| 3 | MF | (Ghana) | Michael Essien | 4 | 0 | 1 | 0 | 5 |
| 4 | MF | (France) | Fabrice Jau | 3 | 0 | 0 | 0 | 3 |
| = | DF | (Brazil) | Demetrius Ferreira | 3 | 0 | 0 | 0 | 3 |
| = | FW | (France) | Nicolas Dieuze | 2 | 1 | 0 | 0 | 3 |
| = | MF | (Argentina) | Damián Manso | 1 | 2 | 0 | 0 | 3 |
| 8 | FW | (Guinea) | Ousmane Soumah | 1 | 1 | 0 | 0 | 2 |
| = | MF | (France) | Lilian Nalis | 1 | 0 | 1 | 0 | 2 |
| = | DF | (France) | Bernard Lambourde | 1 | 0 | 1 | 0 | 2 |
| 9 | MF | (France) | Prince Daye | 1 | 0 | 0 | 0 | 1 |
| = | MF | (France) | Pierre Deblock | 1 | 0 | 0 | 0 | 1 |
| = | MF | (France) | Cyril Jeunechamp | 1 | 0 | 0 | 0 | 1 |
| = | DF | (France) | Christophe Deguerville | 0 | 0 | 1 | 0 | 1 |

=== League top assists ===
As of 25 June 2012

| Place | Position | Nation | Name | Assists |
|---|---|---|---|---|
| 1 | MF | (France) | Cyril Jeunechamp | 6 |
| 2 | FW | (France) | Nicolas Dieuze | 5 |
| 3 | FW | (France) | Tony Vairelles | 4 |
| = | MF | (Argentina) | Damián Manso | 4 |
| 5 | MF | (France) | Fabrice Jau | 3 |
| = | MF | (Ghana) | Michael Essien | 3 |
| = | FW | (France) | Prince Daye | 3 |
| = | MF | (France) | Patrick Beneforti | 3 |
| 9 | MF | (France) | Sébastien Piocelle | 2 |
| = | DF | (France) | Cédric Uras | 2 |
| = | DF | (France) | Lilian Nalis | 2 |
| 12 | DF | (Brazil) | Demetrius Ferreira | 1 |
| = | FW | (Guinea) | Ousmane Soumah | 1 |
| = | MF | (France) | Pierre Deblock | 1 |
| = | DF | (United States) | Greg Vanney | 1 |
