= 2003–04 SC Bastia season =

SC Bastia
2003–04 season
- Chairman: François Nicolaï
- Manager: Gérard Gili
- Stadium: Stade Armand Cesari
- Ligue 1: 17th
- Coupe de France: End of 64
- Coupe de la Ligue: End of 16
- Top goalscorer: League: Florian Maurice (8); All: Florian Maurice (9)
- Highest home attendance: 8,910 vs Metz (9 August 2003)
- Lowest home attendance: 4,746 vs Rennes (3 December 2003)
- Average home league attendance: 5,896
Home colours	Away colours

French football club SC Bastia's 2003–04 season. Finished 17th place in league. Top scorer of the season, including 9 goals in 8 league matches have been Florian Maurice. Was eliminated to Coupe de France end of 64, the Coupe de la Ligue was able to be among the final 16 teams.

== Transfers ==
=== In ===
Summer

- Youssouf Hadji from Nancy
- Frédéric Née from Lyon
- Niša Saveljić from Sochaux
- Benoît Cauet from Calcio Como 1907
- Alou Diarra from Le Havre
- Angelo Hugues from Wisła Kraków
- Pascal Chimbonda from Le Havre

Winter

- Bartholomew Ogbeche from Paris SG
- Philippe Delaye from Rennes
- Vitorino Hilton from Servette

=== Out ===
Summer

- Hassan Ahamada to Nantes
- Philippe Billy to Lecce
- Grégory Vignal to Liverpool
- Ali Boumnijel to Rouen
- Samir Beloufa to Royal Mouscron-Péruwelz
- Nicolas Alnoudji to Sedan
- Michael Essien to Lyon
- Lilian Laslandes to Nice
- Franck Silvestre to Sturm Graz

Winter

- Niša Saveljić to Guingamp
- Laurent Batlles to Marseille
- Demetrius Ferreira to Marseille

== Ligue 1 ==
=== League table ===
Pos	Team	Pld	W	D	L	GF	GA	GD	Pts	Qualification or relegation
15	Ajaccio	38	10	10	18	33	55	−22	40	
16	Toulouse	38	9	12	17	31	44	−13	39	
17	Bastia	38	9	12	17	33	49	−16	39	
18	Guingamp (R)	38	10	8	20	36	58	−22	38	Relegation to Ligue 2
19	Le Mans (R)	38	9	11	18	35	57	−22	38	Relegation to Ligue 2

Source: Ligue 1
Rules for classification: 1) points; 2) goal difference; 3) number of goals scored.
(R) Relegated

=== Results summary ===
Overall								Home						Away					
Pld	W	D	L	GF	GA	GD	Pts	W	D	L	GF	GA	GD	W	D	L	GF	GA	GD
38	9	12	17	33	49	−16	39	8	6	5	22	18	+4	1	6	12	11	31	−20

Source: LFP

=== Results by round ===
Round	1	2	3	4	5	6	7	8	9	10	11	12	13	14	15	16	17	18	19	20	21	22	23	24	25	26	27	28	29	30	31	32	33	34	35	36	37	38
Ground	A	H	A	H	A	H	A	H	A	H	A	H	A	H	A	H	A	H	H	A	H	A	H	A	H	A	H	A	H	A	H	A	H	A	H	A	A	H
Result	D	L	L	W	W	W	L	W	L	W	D	D	L	L	D	W	L	D	L	L	D	D	W	L	D	L	W	D	D	L	W	D	L	L	D	L	L	L
Position	12	17	19	16	12	8	13	9	10	8	8	10	12	13	13	10	12	12	13	13	13	14	14	14	14	14	14	13	13	13	13	13	13	14	13	15	15	17

Source: LFP
A = Away; H = Home; W = Win; D = Draw; L = Loss

=== Matches ===
Date	Opponent	H / A	Result	Goal(s)	Attendance	Referee
2 August 2003	Paris SG	A	0 - 0	-	33,991	Thierry Auriac
9 August 2003	Metz	H	0 - 2	-	8,910	Philippe Kalt
16 August 2003	AS Monaco	A	2 - 0	-	11,595	Pascal Viléo
23 August 2003	Montpellier	H	1 - 0	Maurice 88' (pen.)	6,236	Dominique Fraise
30 August 2003	Toulouse	A	0 - 2	Maurice 34', Ben Saada 39'	14,152	Bruno Ruffray
13 September 2003	Guingamp	H	4 - 2	A. Diarra 16', Ben Saada 36', Née 51', 86'	5,689	Stéphane Lannoy
20 September 2003	Auxerre	A	4 - 1	A. Diarra 30'	10,067	Gilles Veissière
27 September 2003	Sochaux	H	2 - 0	Hadji 7', Flachez 21' (o.g.)	5,844	Olivier Thual
5 October 2003	Marseille	A	3 - 1	Née 49'	50,148	Bruno Derrien
18 October 2003	Lens	H	3 - 1	Saveljić 8', Hadji 25', Née 49'	5,514	Laurent Duhamel
25 October 2003	Le Mans	A	1 - 1	Maurice 19'	11,135	Bruno Ruffray
1 November 2003	Ajaccio	H	1 - 1	Maurice 44'	6,756	Pascal Garibian
8 November 2003	Nice	A	2 - 0	-	10,194	(Luxembourg) Alain Hamer
22 November 2003	Nantes	H	1 - 3	Chimbonda 6'	5,488	Alain Sars
30 November 2003	Bordeaux	A	1 - 1	Hadji 87'	20,378	Stéphane Bré
3 December 2003	Rennes	H	3 - 2	Maurice 35' (pen.), Cauet 62' (red card) 86', Hadji 80'	4,746	Hervé Piccirillo
6 December 2003	Strasbourg	A	4 - 2	Hadji 39', 70'	9,747	Fredy Faturel
13 December 2003	Lyon	H	0 - 0	-	5,492	Laurent Duhamel
20 December 2003	Lille	H	0 - 2	-	4,921	Stéphane Moulin
10 January 2004	Metz	A	1 - 0	Ferreira (yellow card) 76' (yellow-red card)	12,428	Pascal Viléo
17 January 2004	AS Monaco	H	0 - 0	-	6,068	Éric Poulat
31 January 2004	Montpellier	A	1 - 1	Cauet 65', Uras (yellow card) 77' (yellow-red card)	13,799	Stéphane Lannoy
7 February 2004	Toulouse	H	1 - 0	Ogbeche 28'	5,320	Damien Ledentu
14 February 2004	Guingamp	A	1 - 0	-	13,266	Dominique Fraise
21 February 2004	Auxerre	H	0 - 0	-	5,256	Stéphane Bré
29 February 2004	Sochaux	A	2 - 1	Maurice 50' (pen.)	15,930	Laurent Duhamel
7 March 2004	Marseille	H	4 - 1	Maurice 22', A. Diarra 27', Ben Saada 49', Ogbeche 56'	6,803	Bertrand Layec
13 March 2004	Lens	A	0 - 0	-	33,421	Olivier Thual
20 March 2004	Le Mans	H	0 - 0	-	5,565	Fredy Faturel
27 March 2004	Ajaccio	A	1 - 0	Delaye (yellow card) 65' (yellow-red card)	5,442	Éric Poulat
3 April 2004	Nice	H	2 - 1	A. Diarra 28', Maurice 37'	5,749	Pascal Viléo
10 April 2004	Nantes	A	1 - 1	Gourvennec 80'	30,095	Hervé Piccirillo
24 April 2004	Bordeaux	H	0 - 2	-	5,595	Stéphane Moulin
1 May 2004	Rennes	A	4 - 0	Hilton (red card) 75'	20,634	Fredy Faturel
8 May 2004	Strasbourg	H	0 - 0	Uras (red card) 86'	4,850	Bruno Derrien
12 May 2004	Lyon	A	1 - 0	Cauet (yellow card) 65' (yellow-red card)	38,723	Hervé Piccirillo
15 May 2004	Lille	A	2 - 0	-	14,161	Olivier Thual
23 May 2004	Paris SG	H	0 - 1	-	7,216	Claude Colombo

== Coupe de France ==
Date	Round	Opponent	H / A	Result	Goal(s)	Attendance	Referee
4 January 2004	End of 64	Besançon	A	[ 2 - 0]		4,000	Tony Chapron

== Coupe de la Ligue ==
Date	Round	Opponent	H / A	Result	Goal(s)	Attendance	Referee
29 October 2003	End of 32	Toulouse	H	1 - 0	Ben Saada 6'	3,963	Jean-Marc Bonnin
17 December 2003	End of 16	Gueugnon	A	3 - 1	Maurice 15'	6,238	Pascal Garibian

== Statistics ==
=== Top scorers ===
As of 28 May 2012

Place	Position	Nation	Name	Ligue 1	Coupe de France	Coupe de la Ligue	Total
1	FW	(France)	Florian Maurice	8	0	1	9
2	FW	(Morocco)	Youssouf Hadji	6	0	0	6
3	MF	(France)	Alou Diarra	4	0	0	4
=	FW	(France)	Frédéric Née	4	0	0	4
=	MF	(Tunisia)	Chaouki Ben Saada	3	0	1	4
6	FW	(Nigeria)	Bartholomew Ogbeche	2	0	0	2
=	MF	(France)	Benoît Cauet	2	0	0	2
8	MF	(France)	Jocelyn Gourvennec	1	0	0	1
=	DF	(Serbia and Montenegro)	Niša Saveljić	1	0	0	1
=	DF	(France)	Pascal Chimbonda	1	0	0	1

=== League top assists ===
As of 28 May 2012

Place	Position	Nation	Name	Assists
1	MF	(France)	Laurent Batlles	6
2	FW	(France)	Florian Maurice	5
3	FW	(Nigeria)	Bartholomew Ogbeche	3
=	FW	(Morocco)	Youssouf Hadji	3
5	MF	(France)	Jocelyn Gourvennec	2
=	DF	(France)	Pascal Chimbonda	2
7	MF	(Tunisia)	Chaouki Ben Saada	1
=	DF	(Brazil)	Demetrius Ferreira	1
=	MF	(France)	Alou Diarra	1
=	MF	(France)	Benoît Cauet	1
=	MF	(France)	Sébastien Piocelle	1
