= 2002 Coupe de France final =

Final of the 2001–02 edition of the Coupe de France

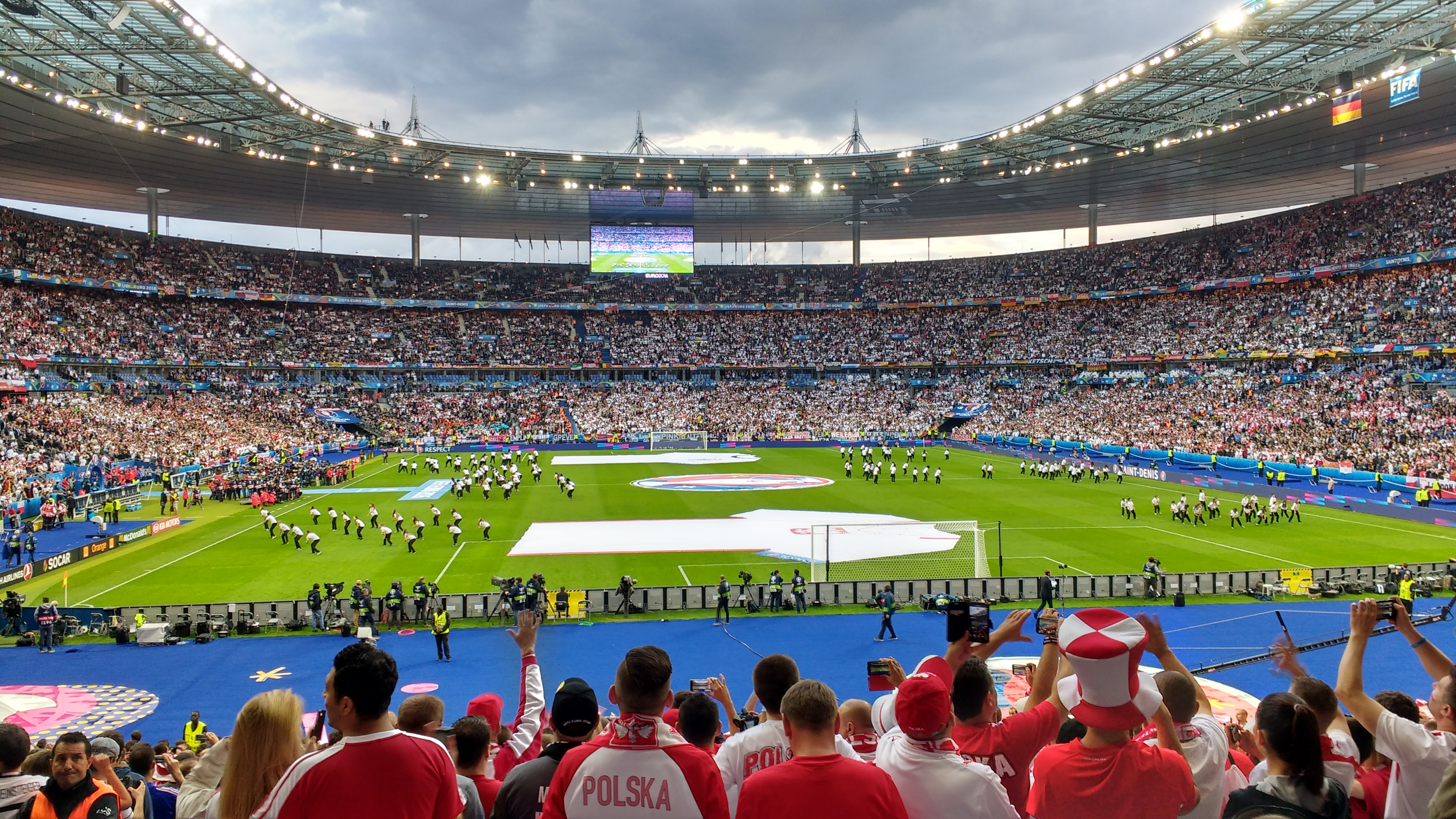
- Event: 2001–02 Coupe de France
Bastia	Lorient
0	1
- Date: 11 May 2002
- Venue: Stade de France, Saint-Denis
- Referee: Éric Poulat
- Attendance: 66,215

The 2002 Coupe de France final was a football match held at Stade de France, Saint-Denis on 11 May 2002. FC Lorient defeated SC Bastia 1–0 thanks to a goal by captain Jean-Claude Darcheville. This match was also famous for the appearance of Rémi Gaillard, who disguised himself as a Lorient player.

== Route to the final ==
Bastia			Round	Lorient
Opponent	H/A	Result	2001–02 Coupe de France	Opponent	H/A	Result
Nantes	H	3–1	Round of 64	Douai	A	3–1
Sochaux	H	2–1	Round of 32	Rennes	A	2–1
Nancy	H	2–0	Round of 16	Louhans-Cuiseaux	A	2–2 (a.e.t.); 6−5 pen.
Libourne	A	1–0	Quarter-finals	Paris SG	A	1–0
Sedan	H	1–0	Semi-finals	Nîmes	H	1–0

== Match details ==
11 May 2002
20:45

Bastia	0–1	Lorient
		Darcheville 41'

Stade de France, Saint-Denis
Attendance: 66,215
Referee: Éric Poulat

GK	1	(Tunisia) Ali Boumnijel
RB	8	(Ghana) Michael Essien
CB	3	(Guinea) Morlaye Soumah	(yellow card) 86'
CB	2	(France) Cédric Uras
LB	7	(France) Cyril Jeunechamp (c)		(substituted off) 76'
DM	4	(France) Frédéric Mendy
RM	10	(France) Fabrice Jau
CM	6	(France) Lilian Nalis
LM	5	(France) Christophe Deguerville		(substituted off) 53'
CF	9	(France) Tony Vairelles
CF	11	(Liberia) Prince Daye	(yellow card) 82'	(substituted off) 86'
Substitutes:
GK	16	(France) Nicolas Penneteau
DF	13	(Brazil) Demetrius Ferreira		(substituted on) 86'
DF	15	(France) Bernard Lambourde
MF	12	(France) Nicolas Dieuze		(substituted on) 53'
MF	14	(France) Patrick Beneforti		(substituted on) 76'
Manager:
(France) Robert Nouzaret

GK	1	(France) Sébastien Hamel
CB	5	(France) Richard Martini
CB	6	(Senegal) Pape Malick Diop
CB	4	(France) Anthony Gauvin
RWB	2	(France) Loïc Druon		(substituted off) 65'
LWB	3	(France) Arnaud Le Lan
DM	8	(Mali) Seydou Keita
RM	7	(Guinea) Pascal Feindouno
LM	10	(France) Pascal Bedrossian		(substituted off) 84'
AM	11	(Ivory Coast) Élie Kroupi	(yellow card) 55'	(substituted off) 58'
CF	9	(France) Jean-Claude Darcheville (c)	(yellow card) 42'
Substitutes:
GK	16	(France) Stéphane Le Garrec
DF	12	(France) Pascal Delhommeau		(substituted on) 65'
MF	14	(Ivory Coast) Tchiressoua Guel
MF	15	(France) Johan Cavalli		(substituted on) 58'
FW	13	(France) Nicolas Esceth-N'Zi	(yellow card) 90+2'	(substituted on) 84'
Manager:
(France) Yvon Pouliquen

== See also ==
- 2001–02 Coupe de France
