= Deblock =

Deblock may refer to:

- A directive in CONFIG.SYS
- The process of extracting data from blocks
- Pierre Deblock, a French former professional footballer
- Deblocking as done by a deblocking filter to improve visual quality of compressed video
