= Michael Essien =

Ghanaian footballer (born 1982)

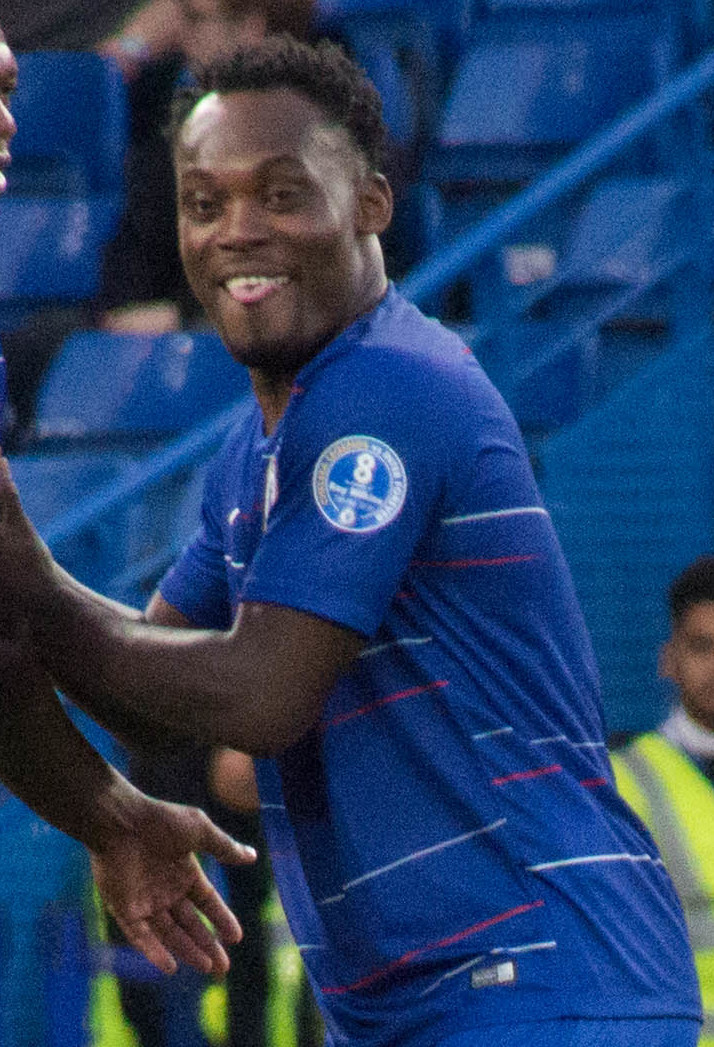
- Essien in 2018

Personal information
- Full name: Michael Essien
- Date of birth: 3 December 1982 (age 43)
- Place of birth: Accra, Ghana
- Height: 1.78 m (5 ft 10 in)
- Position: Midfielder

Team information
- Current team: Nordsjælland (assistant coach)

Youth career
- 1998–1999: Liberty Professionals

Senior career*
| Years | Team | Apps | (Gls) |
| 2000–2003 | Bastia | 66 | (11) |
| 2003–2005 | Lyon | 71 | (7) |
| 2005–2014 | Chelsea | 168 | (17) |
| 2012–2013 | → Real Madrid (loan) | 21 | (2) |
| 2014–2015 | AC Milan | 20 | (0) |
| 2015–2016 | Panathinaikos | 16 | (1) |
| 2017–2018 | Persib Bandung | 29 | (5) |
| 2019–2020 | Sabail | 14 | (0) |
| Total | | 402 | (43) |

International career
| 2002–2014 | Ghana | 59 | (9) |

Managerial career
- 2020–: Nordsjælland (assistant)
Medal record
Representing Ghana
Men's football
Africa Cup of Nations
| Third place | 2008 |
| Runner-up | 2010 |
- * Club domestic league appearances and goals

Michael Essien (born 3 December 1982) is a Ghanaian football coach and former player who is currently an assistant coach at Danish Superliga club Nordsjælland.

A midfielder, Essien started his career playing for Liberty Professionals in Ghana. In 2000, he moved to France to join Bastia, where he would spend three seasons and appear in over 60 matches before joining Ligue 1 title holders Lyon in 2003. At Lyon, Essien won back-to-back league titles in 2003–04 and 2004–05, and won Ligue 1 Player of the Year in 2005. The same year, Essien signed with Premier League side Chelsea for a £24.4 million transfer fee. The fee made him the most expensive African footballer at that time. At Chelsea, Essien helped the club win the Premier League in 2006 and 2010, as well as three FA Cups and one League Cup. He won the UEFA Champions League in 2011–12, while also placing as runner-up in the 2007–08 UEFA Champions League. He has won the Chelsea Goal of the Season award twice, in the 2006–07 and 2008–09 seasons.

He also played for the Ghana national team, earning more than 50 caps. He contributed to Ghana's third-place finish at the 1999 FIFA U-17 World Championship and their runner-up position at the 2001 FIFA World Youth Championship. Essien made his senior team debut in January 2002 and has represented his nation at three Africa Cup of Nations tournaments. Essien also represented Ghana at the 2006 and 2014 FIFA World Cups.

== Early life ==
Essien was born in Accra to Aba Gyandoh, a baker, and James Essien of Awutu Beraku, an aboriginal Guan town in central Ghana. Essien attended Gomoa Nyanyano DC Primary and JSS. He began his football career after graduating from St. Augustine's College in Cape Coast, playing at a local club, Liberty Professionals. Essien grew up a boyhood Aston Villa fan, influenced by his father's love for the Birmingham based club. Essien idolised Paul McGrath modelling many aspects of his game around the midfielder's playing style.

Essien broke through when he played in the 1999 FIFA U-17 World Championship in New Zealand. European scouts began to take notice, prompting a trial at Manchester United in April 2000. He played in the club's under-17 team's defeat to Derby County.

Manchester United offered him a contract, but he was ineligible to obtain a work permit in the United Kingdom. He, therefore, considered joining Belgian feeder club Royal Antwerp. However, his mother meanwhile preferred a move to France instead.

== Club career ==
=== Bastia ===
In July 2000, Essien was signed by Division 1 club Bastia and made his debut for the club on 30 September 2000 in a league match against Metz, appearing as a substitute for captain Laurent Casanova. Essien did not immediately command a consistent place in the team, being deployed in various positions in the back four. He ultimately finished the 2000–01 campaign with only 13 league appearances and one goal, which came in the return leg against Metz in a 3–2 defeat. The following season, Essien was given opportunity by manager Robert Nouzaret to play in central midfield and he flourished in this new role. Essien formed midfield partnerships with Nicolas Dieuze and Cyril Jeunechamp and scored vital goals in victories over Nantes, Lorient and Guingamp. On 12 January 2002, Essien scored the equalising goal against Marseille at the Stade Vélodrome to even the match at 2–2. He also scored a goal in the Coupe de la Ligue against Le Mans. Future Chelsea teammate Didier Drogba converted a goal for Le Mans in the match.

In the 2002–03 season, Essien developed into an undisputed starter under new manager Gérard Gili. However, his tenacious and physical style of play also began to take form as he received 12 yellow cards in league play. He opened the new campaign by scoring on his season debut against Lens in a 1–1 draw and converted five more league goals, which included one in a 2–0 victory over the defending champions Lyon. Following the campaign, in which Bastia finished mid-table for the third consecutive season, Essien drew interest from Paris Saint-Germain, Lyon and Marseille.

=== Lyon ===
Paris Saint-Germain made Bastia the highest offer and it was accepted. However, Essien rejected PSG's contract offer, instead agreeing terms with the two-time defending champions Lyon, who paid Bastia €7.8 million for the transfer. Upon his arrival, Essien was assigned the number 4 shirt and played as a box-to-box midfielder, which allowed him the freedom to protect and assist playmaker Juninho while defensive midfielders Edmílson and Mahamadou Diarra assisted the defence and directed the distribution. Essien made his club debut in the team's Trophée des champions match against Auxerre on 27 July 2003. In just the fifth minute of play, Essien scored his first goal for the club, and four minutes later, Diarra scored a goal. Lyon won the match 2–1, giving Essien his first club honour as a player. In just the third match of the campaign, Essien scored his first league goal for the club in a 3–1 victory over Monaco. He featured regularly for the rest of the campaign, making 33 more league appearances and scoring two more goals, against Bordeaux and Rennes respectively. On 23 May 2004, Lyon sealed their third consecutive league title by defeating Lille 3–0 at the Stade Gerland. Essien appeared as a substitute in the match. In the UEFA Champions League, Essien appeared in eight of the ten matches Lyon contested and the club was ultimately eliminated by eventual champions, Porto.

In his final season at Lyon, Essien appeared in all but one league match as Lyon were crowned champions for the fourth straight season. The match he missed was as a result of a red card endured in the previous league match. Essien also scored three goals and collected 11 yellow cards, tied for second-worst in the league. His performances in the league resulted in him being voted the 2005 Player of the Year by France's National Union of Professional Footballers (UNFP). Essien also helped Lyon to reach the quarter-finals of the 2004–05 UEFA Champions League where he put in dynamic performances and scored five goals in the tournament. Lyon was eventually eliminated from the tournament in a penalty shoot-out against PSV. At the end of the season, he was named Ligue 1 Player of the Year. His honour started a record streak of UNFP Player of the Year awards for Lyon players, with the streak coming to an end in 2008 following Karim Benzema's victory. He was also nominated for the 2005 FIFA World Player of the Year Award. He placed 22nd in 2005. His acclaim drew attention from Chelsea, which he eventually signed for.

=== Chelsea ===
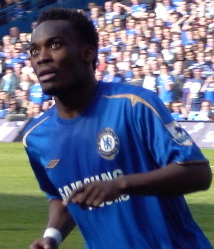
Essien playing for Chelsea in 2006

On 14 August 2005, Lyon and Chelsea agreed a £24.4 million fee for Essien, ending one of the longest-running transfer sagas. At the time, the fee made Essien Chelsea's most expensive signing of all time, surpassing the £24 million Chelsea paid for Didier Drogba the previous summer. The transfer went through on 19 August. The transfer came under scrutiny in the Stevens inquiry report, which expressed concerns because of the lack of co-operation from agents Pini Zahavi and Barry Silkman.

Essien made his debut as a second-half substitute against Arsenal on 21 August 2005, wearing the number 5 on his shirt. The match ended in a 1–0 victory to Chelsea. He made an assist in his full debut against West Bromwich Albion, and he replaced the injured Claude Makélélé in the defensive midfield role against Sunderland in the 2–0 win on 10 September 2005. He soon cemented his place in José Mourinho's side, starting in 31 domestic league matches, as well as 11 appearances in other cup competitions.

On 15 December 2005, Essien was given a two-match ban by UEFA for a controversial tackle on Dietmar Hamann, which resulted in his suspension from Chelsea's Champions League second round tie with eventual European champions Barcelona. Essien apologised to Hamann for the challenge, stating that while he desires to be perceived as a player who "unsettles" opponents, he was not a malicious or an unsporting player; Hamann publicly accepted Essien's apology. In January 2006, Essien was himself stretchered off the field after a challenge from West Ham United's captain, Nigel Reo-Coker, and was sidelined for three weeks.

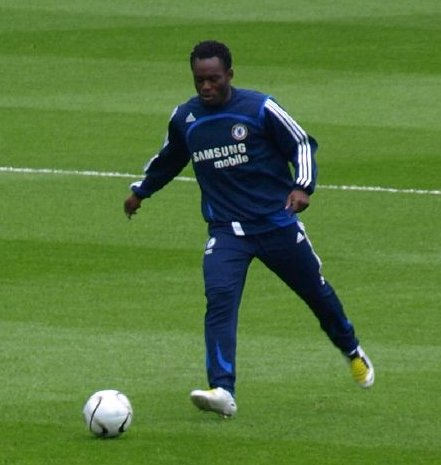
Essien warming up before a game in 2008

Essien scored his first goal for Chelsea from a low cross from Shaun Wright-Phillips on 11 March 2006, in a 2–1 victory over Tottenham Hotspur. His second goal came on 17 April 2006, against Everton with a powerful strike after an assertive burst through the defensive line. Essien ended his maiden season in England with two goals, both in the Premier League.

Essien was nominated for the 2006 FIFA World Player of the Year Award on 12 October 2006, where he placed 22nd. One week later, he was nominated for the 2006 Ballon d'Or. He was voted as the third Best African Footballer of the Year in 2006, a feat he also achieved in 2005. He won the 2006 BBC African footballer of the year award.

The following season, Essien scored several important goals, including his first Champions League goal for Chelsea in a 2–0 victory over Werder Bremen on 12 September 2006. Later in the competition, Essien scored a late winner in the quarter-final second leg against Valencia at the Mestalla Stadium to send Chelsea through to the semifinals with a 2–1 victory on the night and a 3–2 win on aggregate. It was his first match back in the team after several weeks out with a knee injury. Essien also scored a stunning late equaliser at home against Arsenal on 10 December 2006, as the match was going to end Chelsea's long unbeaten run.

On 15 May 2007, Chelsea fans voted Essien as Chelsea Player of the Year for his contributions in the 2006–07 season, becoming the first African to receive the honour. His late dramatic equalising goal against Arsenal was also voted as Chelsea Goal of the Season for 2006–07.

On 12 August 2007, Essien scored the winner with his first goal of the 2007–08 Premier League campaign, as Chelsea defeated Birmingham City to set an English record for unbeaten league matches at home, eclipsing Liverpool's previous top-flight record of 63 sets between 1978 and 1981.

On 10 October 2007, Essien was nominated for the prestigious 2007 FIFA World Player of the Year Award for the third consecutive year and on 21 October 2007, he was also nominated for the 2007 Ballon d'Or Award for the third consecutive year. He was voted 15th Best Player in the World at the 2007 FIFA World Player of the Year Awards. On 12 December 2007, he was nominated for the 2007 African Footballer of the Year, the third consecutive time he had been nominated. He was runner-up to that year's winner, Frédéric Kanouté.

On 22 July 2008, Essien signed a new five-year deal with Chelsea, keeping him at the club until 2013. He also extended his contract on 12 March 2007.

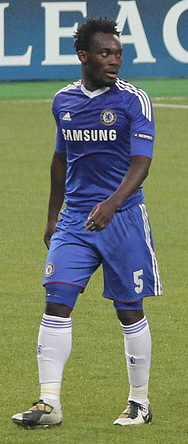
Essien playing for Chelsea in 2010

It was feared Essien would miss the 2008–09 Premier League season after sustaining anterior cruciate ligament damage on 5 September while playing for Ghana. However, on 7 March 2009, he came on as a substitute in the second half of the FA Cup match against Coventry City. In his second match back from the knee injury, Essien scored just before half-time to give Chelsea a vital away goal against Juventus in the Champions League first knockout round. Chelsea went on the draw the match 2–2 and through to the quarter-finals 3–2 on aggregate. He made his first league start from injury against Manchester City, scoring the only goal in the match.

On 6 May 2009, Essien scored a left-footed volley in the second leg of the Champions League semifinal against Barcelona, a tie that Chelsea ultimately lost due to the away goal rule. The goal was later voted as Chelsea's Goal of the Season by the club's fans.

In the 2009–10 Premier League season, Essien put in an excellent performance against Blackburn Rovers on 24 October 2009 and scored his first goal of the season with a swerving 35-yard shot on 52 minutes in a 5–0 victory at Stamford Bridge. He scored his first brace for Chelsea against Wolverhampton Wanderers with a header and a low shot from outside the box and came close to completing his first hat-trick for the club with a flurry of second-half shots, one of which was tipped onto the bar by Wolves goalkeeper Wayne Hennessey. Essien was injured on international duty during the 2010 African Nations Cup and missed the remainder of the English domestic season. On 4 June 2010, he signed a two-year extension to his existing contract which would have kept him at the club until 2015. Essien returned to action on 17 July 2010 in a friendly against Crystal Palace and scored the only goal of the match to give Chelsea the win.

After missing the 2010 FIFA World Cup through injury, Essien had a bright start to the season for Chelsea. He scored the only goal in a pre-season friendly win against Crystal Palace and was an ever-present in Chelsea's unbeaten month of August. He scored a brace against West Ham United, and he scored against MŠK Žilina in the UEFA Champions League. Essien also put in impressive performances against Marseille, Blackburn Rovers and Fulham, the latter a match in which he scored the only goal and received a red card. However, Essien would again incur an injury and missed two months of the season, during which Chelsea won just one out of nine matches. He returned to score in the penalty shoot-out loss in the FA Cup against Everton but ultimately had a poor second half of the season. After Chelsea's final match, the Ghana Football Association announced Essien had returned to the international squad.

In pre-season training for the 2011–12 Premier League season, Essien ruptured his anterior cruciate ligament and meniscus, undergoing surgery on 11 July 2011. His recovery was said to take up to six months. However, he began training lightly in late November 2011 and made his comeback on 9 January 2012, playing 75 minutes of the reserves' 3–2 defeat to West Bromwich Albion. He made his 150th Premier League appearance for Chelsea as a substitute in a 1–0 win over Sunderland. On 21 January 2012, Essien featured as late substitute in Chelsea's 0–0 draw with Norwich City at Carrow Road.

Due to missing most of the beginning half of the 2011–12 Premier League season, Essien was unable to gain favour with manager André Villas-Boas. On 21 February 2012, during a Champions League match against Napoli, Villas-Boas left Frank Lampard, Essien and Ashley Cole on the substitutes' bench. Chelsea lost 3–1 and the club's technical director asked for an explanation of the team selection on behalf of Chelsea owner Roman Abramovich. On 4 March 2012, following a 1–0 league defeat against West Brom which left Chelsea three points adrift of Arsenal in the battle for fourth place in the Premier League, Villas-Boas' employment was terminated by Chelsea, with assistant manager Roberto Di Matteo being appointed as caretaker manager on an interim basis until the end of the season. Di Matteo immediately showed favour towards veteran Chelsea players like Essien, Lampard and John Terry. Subsequently, Essien started in Chelsea's second leg champions league fixture against Napoli, with Chelsea winning 4–1 – and 5–4 on aggregate – in an entertaining match allowing Chelsea to advance to the quarter-final, where they met Benfica. Essien subsequently remained an unused substitute in Chelsea's Champions League run, culminating in the Blues' victory over Bayern Munich in the final, making Chelsea the first London-based club to win the title.

=== Real Madrid (loan) ===
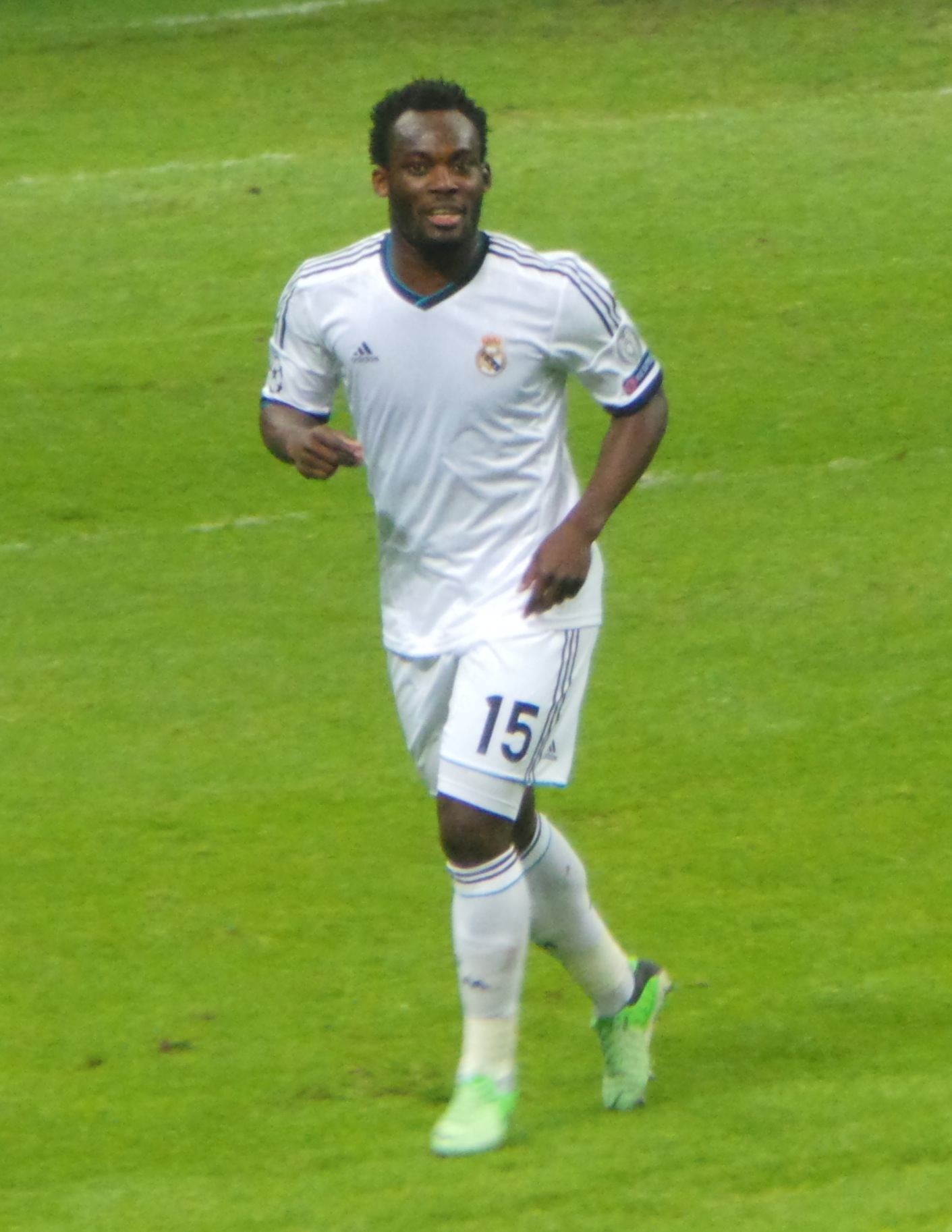
Essien playing for Real Madrid in 2013

On 31 August 2012, Essien signed a season-long loan deal with Real Madrid, reuniting him with his former manager at Chelsea, José Mourinho. At his introductory press conference with Real Madrid, Mourinho affectionally referred to Essien as "his son" while Essien referred to Mourinho as his "Daddy". On 3 November, Essien scored his first goal for Real Madrid. During the last match of the season – and Essien's last game as a Madrid player – Essien scored his second goal for Madrid, which he dedicated to Mourinho.

=== AC Milan ===
Essien signed for Italian club AC Milan on a one-and-a-half-year contract on 27 January 2014.

=== Panathinaikos ===
On 2 June 2015, Essien signed a two-year contract with Greek club Panathinaikos. The deal made him the club's highest-paid player, with an annual salary of €800,000. He spent the first three months of the season recovering from a leg injury. He was due to make his debut on 21 November 2015 against Panathinaikos' archrivals Olympiacos, but the match was cancelled. He played his first match one week later. On 24 January 2016, he scored his first goal for Panathinaikos in a 2–0 away league win over Levadiakos. After a season in Greece, Essien was omitted from Panathinaikos' squad for the 2016–17 season, with the expectation he would be released from his contract. His termination by the club was confirmed almost three months later after the two parties reached a mutual agreement over his release.

After the agreement was reached and Essien was released from his contract, the club failed to remit the money owed to him and Essien appealed to the competent court for football affairs in Greece, which ordered Panathinaikos to pay him the outstanding sum of about €36,000 or face the deduction of three points in the coming 2018/19 competition.

=== Persib Bandung ===
Essien rejected an offer from Australian A-League club Melbourne Victory in September 2016.

On 13 March 2017, Essien joined the Indonesian club side Persib Bandung, signing a one-year contract with an option to extend for an additional year. He took the number 5 shirt for the 2017 Liga 1 season, the same number he wore during his nine years at Chelsea. Speaking about his move to Indonesia, Essien told the club's official website, "I hope I am the prelude to other world players moving to Indonesia." On 22 April, he scored his first goal from the header in a 2–2 draw over PS TNI.

On 17 March 2018, Persib's club chief executive, Zainuri Hasyim said that Persib has released Essien because the club has already filled their maximum quota of foreign players based on the PSSI's regulation.

=== Sabail ===
On 16 March 2019, Essien signed a one-and-a-half-year contract with Sabail FK of the Azerbaijan Premier League, which will also see him coach their U19 team.

== International career ==
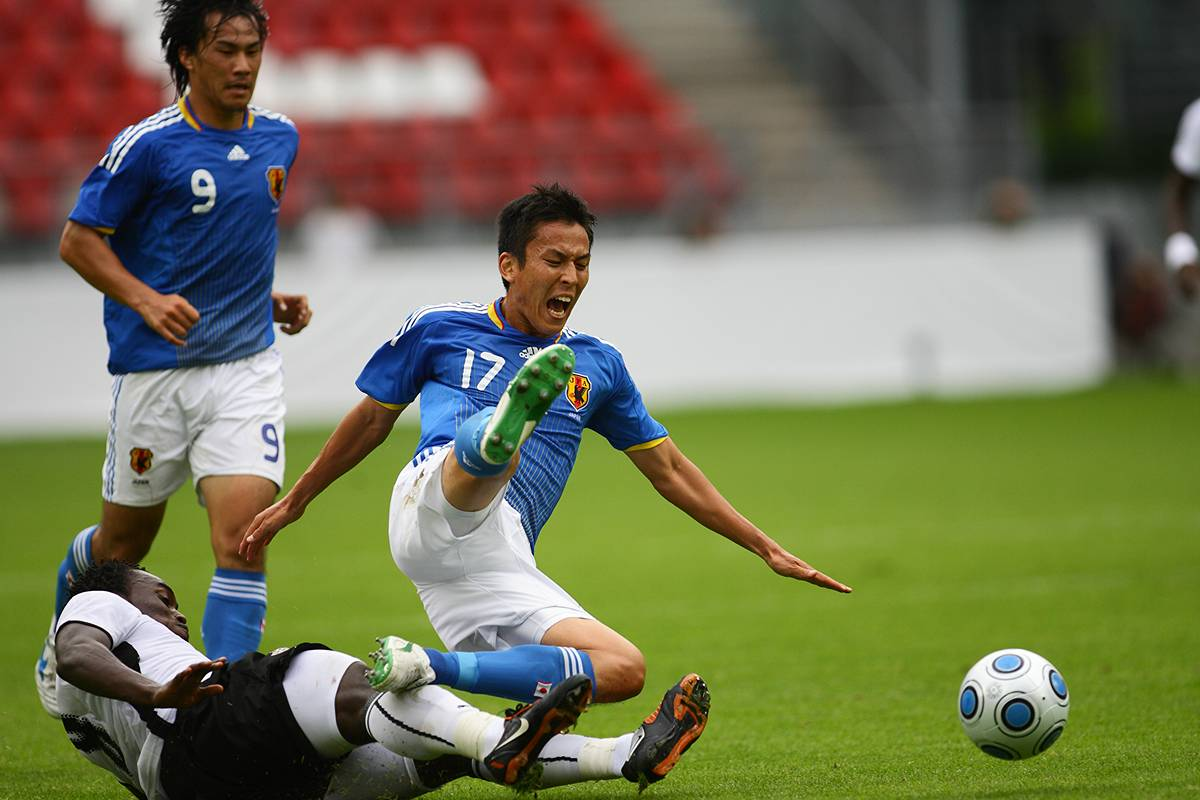
Essien tackling Makoto Hasebe of Japan in a friendly match in 2009

Essien's international career started with the Ghana under-17 national team, the Black Starlets when he played in the 1999 FIFA U-17 World Championship in New Zealand and won the bronze medal. In 2001, despite being one of the youngest players in the tournament, Essien participated in the 2001 FIFA World Youth Championship with the Black Satellites in Argentina, where the nation finished runners-up to Argentina. His exceptional performances captured the attention of many and was widely tipped to be one of Africa's next rising stars.

Essien made his competitive senior debut in the 2002 Africa Cup of Nations against Morocco on 21 January 2002. but had played for Ghana in a pre-tournament friendly against Egypt on 4 January 2002.

On 16 May 2006, Essien was selected to be part of the team that represented Ghana at the 2006 FIFA World Cup in Germany. He played in midfield with team captain Stephen Appiah and Sulley Muntari. Essien played in Ghana's 2–0 defeat to Italy, their 2–0 victory over the Czech Republic, and the 2–1 victory over the United States, and helped Ghana become the only African team to reach the second-round of the 2006 World Cup. However, he was suspended for Ghana's second round match against Brazil and could only watch as Ghana lost 3–0. Upon the team's return to Ghana, Essien said the team had gained invaluable experience and would be aiming to make the next finals, held in Africa for the first time in the tournament's history at the 2010 World Cup.

In the 2008 Africa Cup of Nations, Essien turned in another strong performance, driving the team to the semifinals with his power-packed performances. In the quarter-final against Nigeria, when team captain John Mensah was dismissed on the stroke of the hour for a professional foul on Nigeria's Peter Odemwingie, Essien assumed the captaincy for the remainder of the match as Ghana eventually won 2–1. He was voted as an All-Star Player during the tournament. The Team of the Tournament was decided by the Technical Study Group (TSG) after careful observations of all the tournament's matches.

During an international match played against Libya on 5 September 2008, Essien ruptured his anterior cruciate ligament playing for Ghana in the World Cup qualification stage and was out of action for six months, missing the majority of the 2008–09 season, before returning on 4 March to play for Chelsea Reserves against Aston Villa Reserves. He scored the last goal in the 4–3 loss. He still managed to take part in 10 of Ghana's 11 qualification matches, amassing more than 800 minutes of game time as Ghana finished at the top of their group to seal qualification to the 2010 World Cup. However, it was announced on 27 May 2010 that Essien would miss the World Cup after he was told he would not fully recover from his knee injury until the end of July, more than two weeks after the tournament was to end. Since then, Essien had announced that he would be standing down from the Ghana national side for the near future to focus on his career with Chelsea, having suffered two significant injuries while playing for Ghana in recent years. Having recovered from those injuries, Essien subsequently promised his availability to his nation "very soon".

Essien returned to Ghana's squad in August 2013 for the team's final 2014 World Cup qualifiers. He appeared as a second-half substitute in a 2–1 defeat of Zambia as the Black Stars secured qualification to the final round. He started in both play-off matches against Egypt and was named in Ghana's squad for the tournament finals. He made one appearance, coming on as a second-half substitute in the opening 2–1 defeat to the United States.

In July 2018, Essien has announced his retirement from international football, after over 12 years of active service with Ghana. He said that he even retired before the 2014 FIFA World Cup but he was called back by former Ghana coach, James Kwesi Appiah to come and help the team.

== Coaching career ==
=== Nordsjælland ===
On 19 August 2020 it was revealed that Essien was training with Danish Superliga club Nordsjælland, where he also got the opportunity to be part of the work around the Superliga team and several of the club's academy teams, just as he got a better knowledge of the teaching and development of young people off the field in FCN, as inspiration for his ongoing coaching education. Nordsjælland is in partnership with Right to Dream Academy in Ghana.

However, the club confirmed on 9 September 2020, that they had affiliated with Essien as part of the club's coaching team for the 2020–21 season. In June 2025, he signed a two-year contract to remain as assistant coach at the club.

== Style of play ==
Essien was a physically strong midfielder, who often played in a central midfield role. He was often touted as a box-to-box midfielder for his ability to exert energy in supporting both offensive and defensive play, and for his powerful and tough tackling playing style, which has earned him the nickname "The Bison". Essien could also play as a defender, both on the right of defence and in the centre. In addition to his work-rate, physicality, and defensive skills, Essien also possessed good technique, vision, tactical intelligence, and leadership qualities, and was a powerful striker of the ball from distance.

== Career statistics ==
=== Club ===
Appearances and goals by club, season and competition
| Club | Season | League | | | National cup (Note: Includes Coupe de France, FA Cup, Copa del Rey, Coppa Italia, Greek Football Cup) | | League cup (Note: Includes Coupe de la ligue, Football League Cup) | | Continental | | Other | | Total | |
| Club | Season | Division | Apps | Goals | Apps | Goals | Apps | Goals | Apps | Goals | Apps | Goals | Apps | Goals |
|---|---|---|---|---|---|---|---|---|---|---|---|---|---|---|
| Bastia | 2000–01 | Ligue 1 | 13 | 1 | 2 | 0 | 0 | 0 | — | | — | | 15 | 1 |
| Bastia | 2001–02 | Ligue 1 | 24 | 4 | 4 | 0 | 2 | 1 | 0 | 0 | — | | 30 | 5 |
| Bastia | 2002–03 | Ligue 1 | 29 | 6 | 1 | 0 | 1 | 0 | — | | — | | 31 | 6 |
| Bastia | Total | | 66 | 11 | 7 | 0 | 3 | 1 | — | | — | | 76 | 12 |
| Lyon | 2003–04 | Ligue 1 | 34 | 3 | 2 | 0 | 1 | 0 | 8 (Note: Appearances in UEFA Champions League) | 0 | 1 (Note: Appearance in Trophée des champions) | 1 | 46 | 4 |
| Lyon | 2004–05 | Ligue 1 | 37 | 4 | 2 | 0 | 0 | 0 | 10 | 5 | 1 | 0 | 50 | 9 |
| Lyon | Total | | 71 | 7 | 4 | 0 | 1 | 0 | 18 | 5 | 2 | 1 | 96 | 13 |
| Chelsea | 2005–06 | Premier League | 31 | 2 | 4 | 0 | 1 | 0 | 6 | 0 | — | | 42 | 2 |
| Chelsea | 2006–07 | Premier League | 33 | 2 | 5 | 1 | 6 | 1 | 10 | 2 | 1 (Note: Appearance in FA Community Shield) | 0 | 55 | 6 |
| Chelsea | 2007–08 | Premier League | 27 | 6 | 2 | 0 | 4 | 0 | 12 | 0 | 1 | 0 | 46 | 6 |
| Chelsea | 2008–09 | Premier League | 11 | 1 | 3 | 0 | 0 | 0 | 5 | 2 | — | | 19 | 3 |
| Chelsea | 2009–10 | Premier League | 14 | 3 | 0 | 0 | 1 | 0 | 6 | 1 | 1 | 0 | 22 | 4 |
| Chelsea | 2010–11 | Premier League | 33 | 3 | 2 | 0 | 0 | 0 | 8 | 1 | 1 | 0 | 44 | 4 |
| Chelsea | 2011–12 | Premier League | 14 | 0 | 3 | 0 | 0 | 0 | 2 | 0 | — | | 19 | 0 |
| Chelsea | 2012–13 | Premier League | 0 | 0 | — | | — | | — | | — | | 0 | 0 |
| Chelsea | 2013–14 | Premier League | 5 | 0 | 1 | 0 | 3 | 0 | — | | — | | 9 | 0 |
| Chelsea | Total | | 168 | 17 | 20 | 1 | 15 | 1 | 49 | 6 | 4 | 0 | 256 | 25 |
| Real Madrid (loan) | 2012–13 | La Liga | 21 | 2 | 7 | 0 | — | | 7 | 0 | — | | 35 | 2 |
| Milan | 2013–14 | Serie A | 7 | 0 | 0 | 0 | — | | 2 | 0 | — | | 9 | 0 |
| Milan | 2014–15 | Serie A | 13 | 0 | 0 | 0 | — | | — | | — | | 13 | 0 |
| Milan | Total | | 20 | 0 | 0 | 0 | — | | 2 | 0 | — | | 22 | 0 |
| Panathinaikos | 2015–16 | Super League Greece | 13 | 1 | 3 | 0 | — | | 0 | 0 | — | | 16 | 1 |
| Persib Bandung | 2017 | Liga 1 | 29 | 5 | — | | — | | — | | — | | 29 | 5 |
| Sabail | 2018–19 | Azerbaijan Premier League | 4 | 0 | 0 | 0 | — | | — | | — | | 4 | 0 |
| Sabail | 2019–20 | Azerbaijan Premier League | 10 | 0 | 0 | 0 | — | | 1 (Note: Appearance in UEFA Europa League) | 0 | — | | 11 | 0 |
| Sabail | Total | | 14 | 0 | 0 | 0 | — | | 1 | 0 | — | | 15 | 0 |
| Career total | | | 402 | 43 | 41 | 1 | 19 | 2 | 77 | 11 | 6 | 1 | 545 | 58 |

=== International ===
Appearances and goals by national team and year
| National team | Year | Apps | Goals |
|---|---|---|---|
| Ghana | 2002 | 4 | 0 |
| Ghana | 2003 | 2 | 0 |
| Ghana | 2004 | 5 | 1 |
| Ghana | 2005 | 3 | 2 |
| Ghana | 2006 | 11 | 2 |
| Ghana | 2007 | 6 | 0 |
| Ghana | 2008 | 12 | 3 |
| Ghana | 2009 | 8 | 1 |
| Ghana | 2010 | 1 | 0 |
| Ghana | 2011 | 1 | 0 |
| Ghana | 2012 | 0 | 0 |
| Ghana | 2013 | 3 | 0 |
| Ghana | 2014 | 3 | 0 |
| Total | | 59 | 9 |

List of international goals scored by Michael Essien
| No. | Date | Venue | Opponent | Score | Result | Competition |
|---|---|---|---|---|---|---|
| 1 | 5 September 2004 | Baba Yara Stadium, Kumasi, Ghana | Cape Verde | 1-0 | 2-0 | 2006 FIFA World Cup qualification |
| 2 | 18 June 2005 | FNB Stadium, Johannesburg, South Africa | South Africa | 2-0 | 2-0 | 2006 FIFA World Cup qualification |
| 3 | 4 September 2005 | Baba Yara Stadium, Kumasi, Ghana | Uganda | 1-0 | 2-0 | 2006 FIFA World Cup qualification |
| 4 | 6 April 2006 | Easter Road Stadium, Edinburgh, Scotland | South Korea | 3-1 | 3–1 | Friendly |
| 5 | 8 September 2006 | Seoul World Cup Stadium, Seoul, South Korea | South Korea | 2-0 | 3–1 | Friendly |
| 6 | 29 January 2008 | Ohene Djan Stadium, Accra, Ghana | Morocco | 1-0 | 2–0 | 2008 Africa Cup of Nations |
| 7 | 3 February 2008 | Ohene Djan Stadium, Accra, Ghana | Nigeria | 1-1 | 2–1 | 2008 Africa Cup of Nations |
| 8 | 26 March 2008 | Craven Cottage Stadium, Fulham, England | Mexico | 1-0 | 1–2 | Friendly |
| 9 | 6 September 2009 | Ohene Djan Stadium, Accra, Ghana | Sudan | 2-0 | 2–0 | 2010 FIFA World Cup qualification |

== Honours ==
Lyon

- Ligue 1: 2003–04, 2004–05
- Trophée des Champions: 2003, 2004

Chelsea

- Premier League: 2005–06, 2009–10
- FA Cup: 2006–07, 2008–09, 2011–12
- Football League Cup: 2006–07; runner-up: 2007–08
- FA Community Shield: 2009
- UEFA Champions League: 2011–12; runner-up: 2007–08

Real Madrid

- Copa del Rey runner-up: 2012–13

Ghana

- Africa Cup of Nations runner-up: 2010; third place: 2008
- FIFA U-17 World Cup runner-up: 1997; third place: 1999
- FIFA U-20 World Cup runner-up: 2001

=== Individual ===
- Ligue 1 Player of the Month: October 2004
- Ligue 1 Player of the Year: 2004–05
- Ligue 1 Team of the Year: 2002–03, 2004–05
- CAF Team of the Year: 2005, 2006, 2008, 2009
- BBC African Footballer of the Year: 2006
- Ghana Player of the Year: 2007
- Chelsea Player of the Year: 2007
- Chelsea Goal of the Year: 2006–07 vs Arsenal, 2008–09 vs Barcelona
- 2008 Africa Cup of Nations: Team of the Tournament
