= Antar Yahia =

Algerian footballer (born 1982)

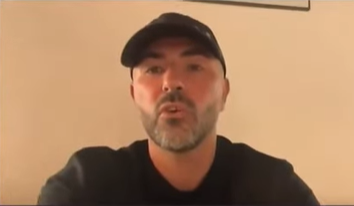
- Yahia in an interview from 2023

Personal information
- Full name: Anther Yahia
- Date of birth: 21 March 1982 (age 44)
- Place of birth: Mulhouse, France
- Height: 1.84 m (6 ft 0 in)
- Position: Centre-back

Youth career
- 1993–1996: Racing Club de Belfort
- 1996–2000: Sochaux
- 2000–2001: Inter Milan

Senior career*
Years	Team	Apps	(Gls)
2000–2002	Inter Milan	0	(0)
2001–2002	→ Bastia (loan)	6	(0)
2002–2005	Bastia	72	(2)
2005–2007	Nice	30	(0)
2006–2007	→ VfL Bochum (loan)	16	(1)
2007–2011	VfL Bochum	103	(6)
2009–2010	VfL Bochum II	2	(0)
2011–2012	Al Nassr	13	(1)
2012–2013	Kaiserslautern	13	(0)
2013	Espérance	7	(0)
2014	Platanias	11	(0)
2015–2016	Angers B	10	(1)
2016	→ Orléans (loan)	14	(1)
2016–2017	Orléans	7	(0)
Total		304	(12)

International career
1998	France U16	1	(0)
2000	France U18	2	(0)
2004	Algeria U23	1	(1)
2004–2012	Algeria	53	(6)

Managerial career
- 2017–2019: Orléans (sporting director)
- 2020–2021: USM Alger (sporting director)
- 2022: FC Spartak Moscow (director of academy)
- 2026–: Algeria (assistant)
- * Club domestic league appearances and goals

Anther Yahia (Arabic: عنتر يحيى; born 21 March 1982) is a former professional footballer who played as a centre-back.

Yahia is a former French youth international having earned caps for both the under-16 and under-18 youth teams for a brief period of time. He was the first footballer to profit from the 2004 change in FIFA eligibility rules as he had played as a French youth international. After his switch of national allegiance he was called up to the Algeria Under-23 side, scoring on his debut in a 1–0 win against Ghana in an Olympic Games qualifier on 2 January 2004. A few days later he was called up to a training camp held in Algiers in preparation of the 2004 African Nations Cup.

At international level, Yahia played for the Algeria national team prior to his retirement from international football on 1 May 2012. He is considered a national hero by many Algerians, as he was the scorer of the goal that put them into their first World Cup finals since 1986, at the expense of bitter rivals Egypt. He struck in the 40th minute of the play-off by scoring a Marco van Basten-esque goal. He participated in two continental tournaments 2004 Africa Cup of Nations and the 2010 Africa Cup of Nations, the latter in which Algeria finished fourth, and the 2010 World Cup in South Africa. Overall, he participated in 53 official games for Algeria, in which he scored six goals. He captained the team during the 2010 World Cup in South Africa, holding the position from June 2010 to May 2012.

== Early life ==
Yahia was born in Mulhouse, France, to Fatima Zohra and Boussaha Yahia, a welder by profession, both of Algerian, Chaoui descent. His parents emigrated to Alsace from the village of Sedrata in the Aurès region in eastern Algeria. In 1985, Yahia's parents decided to move the family back to Algeria as they found it difficult to cope with life in France. They lived in Algeria briefly before again returning to France. Yahia is married to Karima Ziani who is the twin sister of fellow French-Algerian football player Karim Ziani.

He was introduced to the game at the age of 10, when he decided to visit his elder brothers who were playing football. He fell in love with the game and joined the junior team of Racing Club de Belfort, a club in his neighbourhood. He later joined the FC Sochaux-Montbéliard training centre three years later.

He is Muslim and observes fasting during the Islamic month of Ramadan he speaks Arabic, French, German, Italian, English and Spanish.

== Club career ==
Yahia began playing football for the Racing Club de Belfort youth team before joining the Sochaux youth academy at the age of fourteen. However, in 2000, at the age of eighteen Yahia wanted to sign a professional contract, but his wish was denied by the then Sochaux leaders. He decided to leave Sochaux opting to join Internazionale's youth academy.

=== Bastia ===
Yahia started his professional career when he was loaned out by Internazionale in 2001 to Corsican side SC Bastia. He made his senior debut on 16 January 2002 against Lyon, replacing Cédric Uras in the 43rd minute. After four successful years on Corsica, Yahia was transferred to OGC Nice.

=== Nice ===
Yahia signed a four-year contract in the summer of 2005 with OGC Nice after the relegation of SC Bastia. In the first season he played most of the games but at the end he became a substitute. So he decided to move on to another club.

=== VfL Bochum ===
In 2007 English club Leeds United and German side VfL Bochum were interested in Yahia. He did some training exercises at both clubs and both wanted to buy him. Yahia decided to move to the club from the Bundesliga. On 30 January 2007, he played his first Bundesliga match for VfL Bochum against Bayern Munich In a short period he became an important player at the club and had a safe place in the central defense. When the loan contract was expired VfL Bochum signed Yahia for €800,000. He agreed a contract until 2011 with the club and earned on 4 January 2010 the Algerian Player of the Year 2009 award.

In January 2010 in Luanda, Angola, Yahia was presented the award of Arab player of the Year 2009 after winning a poll created by the Arab television channel MBC. One million people participated in the poll, Yahia gained the majority of the votes with 48%.

When VfL Bochum were relegated at the end of the 2009–10 season, Yahia revealed that he would like to leave the club during the summer transfer window, following the World Cup declaring "Indeed, I have decided to leave Bochum" as "I can't play at a lower level". He mentioned that he was aware of interest from clubs in France, but would make his decision after the World Cup.

On 13 October 2010, Yahia agreed a new contract with VfL Bochum that would keep him at the club until 30 June 2014.

=== Al Nassr ===
On 17 July 2011, despite still having three years remaining on his contract with Bochum, Yahia agreed to join Saudi club Al Nassr. On 1 August 2011, the move was made official with Yahia signing a two-year contract with the club. On 21 January 2012, Yahia and Al-Nassr reached a mutual agreement to terminate his contract.

=== 1. FC Kaiserslautern ===
On 25 January 2012, Yahia returned to Germany and signed and a two-year and a half contract with Bundesliga side 1. FC Kaiserslautern.

=== Esperánce ===
On 14 January 2013, Yahia signed a one-year and a half contract with Tunisian club Espérance Sportive de Tunis. A month later, he made his official debut for the club as a starter in a league match against Olympique Béja and was handed the captain's armband.

=== Platanias ===
On 28 January 2014, Yahia joined the Greek side Platanias F.C. on a four-month deal.

=== Angers ===
Six months later, Yahia made his return in France, signing a two-year contract with Ligue 2 team Angers SCO on 11 June 2014.

== International career ==
=== Youth with France ===
Yahia began his youth international career with France in 1998 as he was called up to participate in the UEFA European Under-16 Championship (qualifying round). He made his debut on 7 October 1998 against Switzerland, with the result being 3–3. This was his only appearance for the France-Under 16 as they were eliminated from the competition as they failed to qualify to the final tournament (group stage).

Yahia was called up to play for the France-Under 18 squad in 2000, a time when the team was trying to qualify for the 2001 European Championship to be held in Finland in July 2001. Yahia played his first game alongside Nadir Belhadj against Germany which they won 4–2. In his second game the team had to win if they had any chance of qualifying for the European Championship, they failed to beat the Netherlands and by doing so they were unable to qualify, the final score against the Netherlands was 2–1. The France-Under 18 side finished bottom of Group 9, which consisted of France, Germany and the Netherlands.

=== Senior with Algeria ===
Yahia was the first footballer to profit from the change in FIFA's rules on international eligibility when he made his debut for Algeria in an Olympic Games qualifier against Ghana. He managed to score the only goal of the 1–0 win over Ghana with a 19th-minute header for the Algerian under-23 side in Blida. Rabah Saâdane promoted Yahia to the senior national team after his impressive performance on his debut for Algeria's under-23 side in the Olympic qualifier against Ghana for the 2004 Summer Olympics in Athens.

Yahia started his senior international career on 15 January 2004 against Mali in a friendly in preparation for the 2004 African Cup of Nations hosted in Tunisia. During this continental competition Yahia played a part in all the group games including the 2–1 victory over Egypt and the 1–1 draw against Cameroon, the team progressed from group C alongside Cameroon to the quarter final where Algeria lost to Morocco 3–1 in extra time.

In November 2009, the Algerian team flew out to Cairo for the final world cup qualifier game, when travelling from the airport to the hotel the coach came under attack as Egyptians hurled rocks at the bus, shattering windows and showering the players and staff with broken glass several players were reported to be injured Yahia was understandably furious when they finally arrived to the hotel and said the following “They struck our bus with large bricks,” said a distraught Antar Yahia. "Players have open head wounds with blood. We were lying down in the bus. All the windows were broken. It makes you fear for your life. As long as our lives are not assured we’re afraid to play this match." Yahia then went on to say that the security guards dispatched for the team did nothing in response to the attacks. “They let them do it. You can’t launch five kilo rocks from 50 meters. They let them do it and watched. It’s shameful. In our home game we welcomed them with flowers,” he continued.

The game was not cancelled and went a head as planned, Yahia had played the whole game but it just wasn't meant to be as Egypt scored a second goal in the final minutes of the game the result was 2–0 to Egypt which meant they had the same goal difference and points. So a tie-breaker had to be played in Omdurman, Sudan. On 18 November 2009 Yahia scored in the 40th minute giving Algeria a 1–0 lead against the Pharaohs, in the 67th minute Yahia went off injured but the only goal scored in the play off by Yahia against Egypt was enough to secure Algeria's place in the 2010 World Cup.

In December 2009, Yahia was selected by Saâdane to play in the 2010 African Cup of Nations hosted in Angola, but due to an injury Yahia did not play any of the group games.

During Algeria's 2010 FIFA World Cup first round match against the United States, Yahia was ejected in the final minutes of the game after receiving his second yellow card of the match.

On 1 May 2012, Yahia announced his international retirement.

== Administrative career ==
On 27 December 2016, it was confirmed, that Yahia would retire and continue at Orléans working as sporting director. Yahia left the club officially on 22 November 2019 after a mutual agreement.

On 1 May 2020, Yahia was appointed sporting director of USM Alger. He was close to getting sacked at the end of the year, due to the team's bad results. On 6 August 2021, he was officially fired.

On 17 January 2022, Yahia was presented as the new technical director of Russian academy, F.F. Cherenkov Academy, an academy affiliated with FC Spartak Moscow. Yahia left it for family reasons in June 2022.

== Career statistics ==
=== Club ===
Appearances and goals by club, season and competition
Club	Season	League			National cup		League cup		Continental		Other		Total		Ref.
Club	Season	Division	Apps	Goals	Apps	Goals	Apps	Goals	Apps	Goals	Apps	Goals	Apps	Goals	Ref.
Bastia (loan)	2001–02	Ligue 1	6	0	2	0	1	0	—		—		9	0	
Bastia	2002–03	Ligue 1	23	0	—		1	0	—		—		24	0	
Bastia	2003–04	Ligue 1	18	0	1	0	1	0	—		—		20	0	
Bastia	2004–05	Ligue 1	31	2	1	0	1	0	—		—		33	2	
Bastia	Total		72	2	2	0	3	0	0	0	0	0	77	2	–
Nice	2005–06	Ligue 1	21	0	1	0	3	0	—		—		25	0	
Nice	2006–07	Ligue 1	9	0	1	1	1	0	—		—		11	1	
Nice	Total		30	0	2	1	4	0	0	0	0	0	36	1	–
VfL Bochum (loan)	2006–07	Bundesliga	16	1	0	0	—		—		—		16	1	
VfL Bochum	2007–08	Bundesliga	33	2	2	0	—		—		—		35	2	
VfL Bochum	2008–09	Bundesliga	24	1	2	0	—		—		—		26	1	
VfL Bochum	2009–10	Bundesliga	18	1	2	0	—		—		—		20	1	
VfL Bochum	2010–11	2. Bundesliga	28	2	0	0	—		—		2	0	30	2	
VfL Bochum	Total		103	6	6	0	0	0	0	0	2	0	111	6	–
VfL Bochum II	2008–09	Regionalliga West	1	0	—		—		—		—		1	0	
VfL Bochum II	2009–10	Regionalliga West	1	0	—		—		—		—		1	0	
VfL Bochum II	Total		2	0	0	0	0	0	0	0	0	0	2	0	–
Al Nassr	2011–12	Saudi Professional League	13	1	—		—		—		—		13	1	
1. FC Kaiserslautern	2011–12	Bundesliga	11	0	—		—		—		—		11	0	
1. FC Kaiserslautern	2012–13	2. Bundesliga	2	0	0	0	—		—		—		2	0	
1. FC Kaiserslautern	Total		13	0	0	0	0	0	0	0	0	0	13	0	–
Espérance	2012–13	CLP-1	6	0	—		—		2	0	5	0	13	0	
Espérance	2013–14	CLP-1	1	0	—		—		—		—		1	0	
Espérance	Total		7	0	0	0	0	0	2	0	5	0	14	0	–
Platanias	2013–14	Super League Greece	11	0	—		—		—		—		11	0	
Angers B	2014–15	CFA 2	3	0	—		—		—		—		3	0	
Angers B	2015–16	CFA 2	7	1	—		—		—		—		7	1	
Angers B	Total		10	1	0	0	0	0	0	0	0	0	10	1	–
Orléans (loan)	2015–16	Championnat National	14	1	—		—		—		—		14	1	
Orléans	2016–17	Ligue 2	7	0	—		—		—		—		7	0	
Career total			304	12	12	1	8	0	2	0	7	0	333	13	–

=== International ===
Appearances and goals by national team and year
National team	Year	Apps	Goals
Algeria	2004	13	0
Algeria	2005	3	2
Algeria	2006	4	0
Algeria	2007	6	1
Algeria	2008	8	1
Algeria	2009	6	1
Algeria	2010	9	0
Algeria	2011	3	0
Algeria	2012	1	1
Total		53	6

Scores and results list Algeria's goal tally first, score column indicates score after each Yahia goal.

List of international goals scored by Antar Yahia
No.	Date	Venue	Opponent	Score	Result	Competition
1	19 June 2005	Stade Ahmed Zabana, Oran, Algeria	Zimbabwe	1–0	2–2	2006 FIFA World Cup qualification
2	5 June 2007	Camp Nou, Barcelona, Spain	Argentina	1–1	3–4	Friendly
3	20 June 2008	Stade Mustapha Tchaker, Blida, Algeria	Gambia	1–0	1–0	2010 FIFA World Cup qualification
4	5 September 2008	Stade Mustapha Tchaker, Blida, Algeria	Senegal	3–1	3–2	2010 FIFA World Cup qualification
5	18 November 2009	Al Merreikh Stadium, Omdurman, Sudan	Egypt	1–0	1–0	2010 FIFA World Cup qualification
6	29 February 2012	Independence Stadium, Bakau, Gambau	Gambia	1–1	2–1	2013 Africa Nations Cup qualification

Algeria

- Africa Cup of Nations fourth place: 2010

Individual

- Arab player of the Year: 2009
