= Jean-Christophe Lamberti =

French footballer (born 1982)

Personal information
- Date of birth: January 16, 1982 (age 44)
- Place of birth: Bastia, France
- Height: 1.83 m (6 ft 0 in)
- Position: Midfielder

Youth career
- –2002: Bastia

Senior career*
Years	Team	Apps	(Gls)
2001–2003	Bastia	1	(0)
2003–2005	Gazélec Ajaccio	45	(0)
2005–2014	CA Bastia	123	(8)
2014–2016	Furiani-Agliani	14	(0)
- * Club domestic league appearances and goals as of 1 July 2015

Jean-Christophe Lamberti (born January 16, 1982) is a French former professional footballer who played as a midfielder.

He played on the professional level in Ligue 1 for SC Bastia.
