= Laurent Batlles =

French footballer and manager (born 1975)

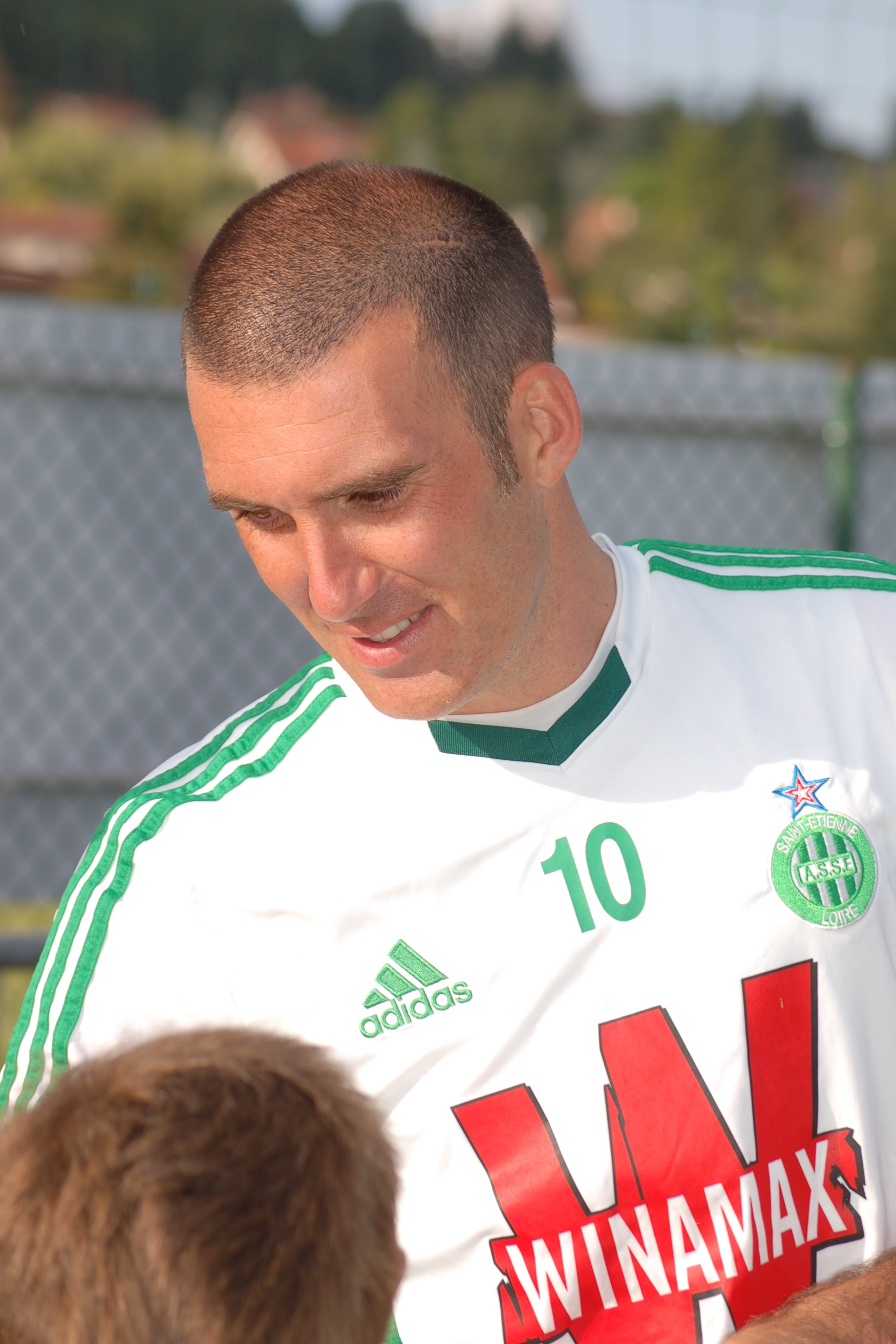
- Batlles as a Saint-Étienne player in 2011

Personal information
- Full name: Laurent Batlles
- Date of birth: 23 September 1975 (age 51)
- Place of birth: Nantes, France
- Height: 1.74 m (5 ft 9 in)
- Position: Midfielder

Youth career
- 1992–1994: Toulouse

Senior career*
Years	Team	Apps	(Gls)
1994–1999	Toulouse	158	(10)
1999–2001	Bordeaux	70	(3)
2002	Rennes	28	(2)
2003	Bastia	38	(4)
2004–2005	Marseille	49	(11)
2005–2008	Toulouse	84	(8)
2008–2010	Grenoble	70	(2)
2010–2012	Saint-Étienne	68	(8)
Total		565	(48)

International career
1991	France U16	1	(0)
1996–1997	France U21	4	(0)

Managerial career
- 2015–2016: Saint-Étienne (assistant)
- 2016–2019: Saint-Étienne (reserves)
- 2019–2021: Troyes
- 2022–2023: Saint-Étienne
- 2024–2025: Clermont Foot
- * Club domestic league appearances and goals

Laurent Batlles (born 23 September 1975) is a French former professional footballer, who played as a midfielder, and current manager.

== Playing career ==
Batlles was born in Nantes. In 1993, he emerged from the Toulouse academy into the senior squad, playing his first game in Division 1 on 2 April 1994 in a 1–0 away loss against Lyon.

In 1999, after scoring ten league goals in six seasons, two spent in Division 2, Batlles signed with Bordeaux, where he took part in exactly half of 1999–2000's league fixtures, adding eight appearances in the side's run in the UEFA Champions League, netting once. The following campaign he scored three in 32 matches, featuring in 19 league games in 2001–02 – six in the UEFA Cup – before completing the latter season at Rennes.

In January 2003, Batlles moved to Corsica and Bastia. He played the remaining 19 fixtures for his new team, a figure he repeated in the first half of 2003–04 (without scoring) before joining Marseille, in another January transfer window move.

Batlles contributed eight matches in l'OM's runner-up run in the UEFA Cup including the final, lost 2–0 to Valencia. The following season he scored eight goals in 30 games and, after starting 2005–06 at the Stade Vélodrome, rejoined Toulouse following problems with manager Jean Fernandez.

Batlles joined permanently in the 2006–07 campaign after a successful loan spell, although he had a contract with Marseille until June 2008. Again, he was an undisputed starter, as Toulouse finished third in the league and reached the third qualifying round of the Champions League, eventually bowing out to Liverpool.

In 2008–09, the 33-year-old Batlles joined newly promoted club Grenoble on a two-year deal, being first choice as it eventually retained its top-flight status. In June 2010, after being relegated, he was released, quickly signing for Saint-Étienne – the first team placed above the relegation zone – at nearly 35 years of age.

== Coaching career ==
Batlles retired from football in May 2012, with a total of 473 French top-tier games and 41 goals. He continued working with his last club, as a technical supervisor.

In June 2019, Batlles was announced as the new coach of Troyes, joining on a two-year contract. He led them back to the top flight in 2021 after a three-year absence, as champions.

Batlles left on 30 December 2021, after falling out with owners City Football Group. He agreed to a two-year deal at recently-relegated Saint-Étienne on 3 June 2022. On 6 December 2023, following five consecutive Ligue 2 defeats, Batlles was sacked.

== Managerial statistics ==
As of match played 5 December 2023

Managerial record by team and tenure
Team	Nat	From	To	Record								Ref
Team	Nat	From	To	G	W	D	L	GF	GA	GD	Win %	Ref
Troyes	(France)	14 June 2019	30 December 2021	89	43	17	29	114	94	+20	48.31	
Saint-Étienne	(France)	3 June 2022	6 December 2023	57	23	15	19	83	75	+8	40.35	
Total				146	66	32	48	197	169	+28	45.21	

== Honours ==
=== Player ===
Marseille

- UEFA Intertoto Cup: 2005

=== Manager ===
Troyes

- Ligue 2: 2020–21
