= Hassan Ahamada =

French footballer (born 1981)

Personal information
- Date of birth: 13 April 1981 (age 45)
- Place of birth: Brest, France
- Height: 1.76 m (5 ft 9 in)
- Position: Striker

Youth career
- 1992–1993: ASCB Brest
- 1993–1996: Stade Brestois
- 1996–1999: Nantes

Senior career*
Years	Team	Apps	(Gls)
1999–2005	Nantes	66	(3)
2002–2003	→ Bastia (loan)	14	(3)
2005	→ Beira Mar (loan)	15	(1)
2005–2006	Belenenses	20	(3)
2006–2007	Châteauroux	24	(3)
2007–2008	Hatta Club	18	(10)
2008–2009	Vannes	0	(0)
2011–2013	Carquefou	7	(0)
Total		164	(23)

International career
2002	France U-20	2	(1)
- * Club domestic league appearances and goals

Hassan Ahamada (born 13 April 1981) is a French former professional footballer who played as a striker.

== Career ==
Whilst at FC Nantes Ahamada contributed 12 appearances as his side won 2000–01 French Division 1.
