= Florian Maurice =

French footballer (born 1974)

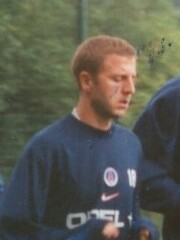
- Maurice, 1997 or 1998

Personal information
- Full name: Florian Alphonse Maurice
- Date of birth: 20 January 1974 (age 52)
- Place of birth: Sainte-Foy-lès-Lyon, Metropolis of Lyon, France
- Height: 1.76 m (5 ft 9 in)
- Position: Striker

Team information
- Current team: Nice (sports director)

Youth career
- Lyon

Senior career*
Years	Team	Apps	(Gls)
1991–1997	Lyon	126	(44)
1997–1998	Paris Saint-Germain	29	(7)
1998–2002	Marseille	83	(30)
2001–2002	→ Celta Vigo (loan)	11	(2)
2002–2004	Bastia	73	(18)
2004–2005	Istres	14	(0)
2005	Châteauroux	10	(1)
Total		325	(95)

International career
1994–1996	France U21	21	(15)
1996–1999	France	6	(1)
- * Club domestic league appearances and goals

Florian Alphonse Maurice (born 20 January 1974) is a French football executive and former professional footballer who played as a striker. He most notably won the 1998 Coupe de France and Coupe de la Ligue with French team Paris Saint-Germain. He played six games and scored a single goal for the France national team, also representing his nation at the 1996 Summer Olympics. He is currently the sports director of Ligue 1 club Nice.

== Early life and career ==
Born in Sainte-Foy-lès-Lyon, Metropolis of Lyon, Maurice started playing youth football with local top-flight team Olympique Lyonnais in 1986. A great hope in French football, Maurice was touted as the new Jean-Pierre Papin. He was included in Lyonnais' senior squad for the Ligue 1 championship in the 1991–92 season, but did not make his Ligue 1 debut until August 1992. His national breakthrough came during the 1994–95 season, when he scored 15 league goals. In the 1995–96 season, he scored 18 league goals for Lyonnais and took part in both the 1996 European Under-21 Championship and 1996 Summer Olympics tournaments.

He made his debut for the France national team in August 1996, under national manager Aimé Jacquet. However, Maurice's progress was halted during the 1996–97 season, when he suffered a ruptured achilles tendon and went through several months of recovery. In the summer 1997, he moved from Lyonnais to league rivals Paris Saint-Germain in a transfer deal worth FF 41 million. He was a part of the Paris SG team which won both the 1998 Coupe de France and Coupe de la Ligue trophies. He played a single season at Paris SG, scoring seven league goals, before he moved on to Olympique de Marseille in the summer 1998.

In his first season at Marseille, Maurice recovered his goal scoring ability, and netted 14 league goals. Marseille reached the final of the international 1999 UEFA Cup tournament, but lost 0–3 to Parma AC from Italy. The following two years at Marseille, Maurice suffered several minor injuries, and could not establish himself in the Marseille starting line-up. He played his last match for the France national team in November 1999, scoring his only national team goal in a 3–0 win against Croatia, before being dropped by new national team manager Roger Lemerre.

He moved abroad in the summer 2001, to play for Celta de Vigo in Spain. After a single, unsuccessful year at the club, he returned to France to play for Ligue 1 club SC Bastia. He had moderate success at Bastia, but when his contract expired in the summer 2004, only newly promoted team FC Istres were in need of his services. He failed to score any goals for the relegation battling Istres team, and left the club in January 2005. He moved to Ligue 2 club LB Châteauroux, where he played until he retired in September 2005.

== Later career ==
From 2009 until 2020, Maurice worked as a scout for Lyon. In June 2020, he was hired by Rennes as technical director. On 6 June 2024, he became the sports director of fellow French club Nice.

== Honours ==
Paris Saint-Germain

- Coupe de France: 1997–98
- Coupe de la Ligue: 1997–98

Individual

- Ligue 1 Young Player of the Year: 1995
