= Tony Vairelles =

French footballer (born 1973)

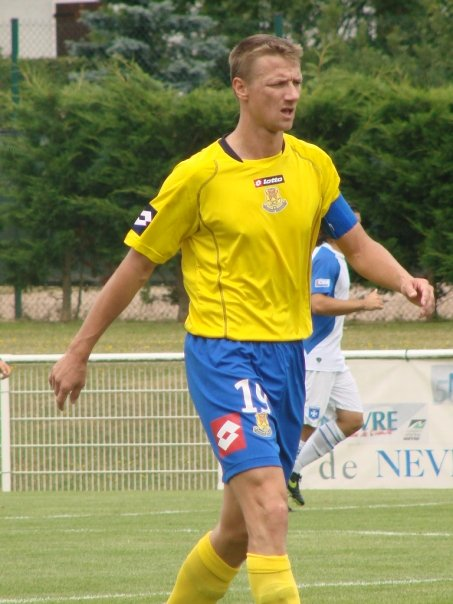
- Vairelles with Gueugnon in 2009

Personal information
- Full name: Tony Mickaël Patrice Yves Vairelles
- Date of birth: 10 April 1973 (age 53)
- Place of birth: Nancy, Meurthe-et-Moselle, France
- Height: 1.86 m (6 ft 1 in)
- Position: Forward

Youth career
- Nancy

Senior career*
Years	Team	Apps	(Gls)
1991–1995	Nancy	127	(39)
1995–1999	Lens	123	(31)
1999–2003	Lyon	63	(11)
2001	→ Bordeaux (loan)	11	(2)
2001–2002	→ Bastia (loan)	30	(14)
2003	→ Lens (loan)	12	(2)
2003–2004	Rennes	21	(1)
2004–2005	SC Bastia	27	(4)
2005–2006	Lierse	15	(0)
2006–2007	Tours	24	(5)
2007–2008	CA Bastia	13	(2)
2008–2009	Dudelange	30	(20)
2009–2011	Gueugnon	61	(17)
Total		557	(148)

International career
1992–1994	France U21	15	(3)
1996	France Olympic	3	(0)
1998–2000	France	8	(1)
- * Club domestic league appearances and goals

Tony Mickaël Patrice Yves Vairelles (born 10 April 1973) is a French former professional footballer who played as a forward.

== Club career ==
A centre-forward, Vairelles started his professional career with hometown club AS Nancy before moving to RC Lens in summer 1995. After four seasons with considerable success (one league and one cup title) he joined Olympique Lyonnais who sent him out on loan three times and finally sold him to Stade Rennais. From then he changed clubs every season. Before the 2008 Major League Soccer season he had a trial with Toronto FC but did not fit into their plans and was not signed. In 2009, he joined FC Gueugnon after a stint at F91 Dudelange. He also became the club's main investor.

In 2002, Sporting CP manager László Bölöni proposed signing Vairelles on loan from Lyon in a deal that would give the French club first option on signing Sporting's young players including Ricardo Quaresma and Cristiano Ronaldo. The deal fell through due to Lyon's lack of interest in the Portuguese players.

== International career ==
Vairelles represented France at the 1996 Summer Olympics.

He made his senior debut for France in an August 1998 friendly match against Austria and went on to earn eight caps, scoring one goal. He played his final international game in April 2000 against Slovenia.

== Personal life ==
Vairelles is the first player from the Romani community (through his maternal biological grandfather) to play for the France national team.

He has one sister, Marilyn, and five brothers, Giovan, Diego, Jimmy, Gino, and Fabrice. His cousin David Vairelles and his younger brothers Giovan and Diego are all professional footballers.

Tony Vairelles and his brothers Giovan, Jimmy, and Fabrice were held in pre-trial detention in Nancy from 25 October 2011 after a shooting in a discothèque in Essey-lès-Nancy. He was freed on 27 March 2012 and put on probation. In June 2015, the trial was still ongoing with Tony Vairelles and his brothers being charged with attempted murder.

On 16 May 2022, Vairelles was sentenced to three years in prison for his part in the attack.

== Career statistics ==
Score and result list France's goal tally first, score column indicates score after Vairelles goal.

International goal scored by Tony Vairelles
No.	Date	Venue	Opponent	Score	Result	Competition
1	13 November 1999	Stade de France, Saint Denis, France	Croatia	3–0	3–0	Friendly

== Honours ==
Lens

- Division 1: 1997–98
- Coupe de la Ligue: 1998–99

Lyon

- Trophée des Champions: 2002
- Ligue 1: 2002–03

Dudelange

- BGL Ligue: 2008–09
- Luxembourg Cup: 2008–09
