= Sébastien Piocelle =

French footballer (born 1978)

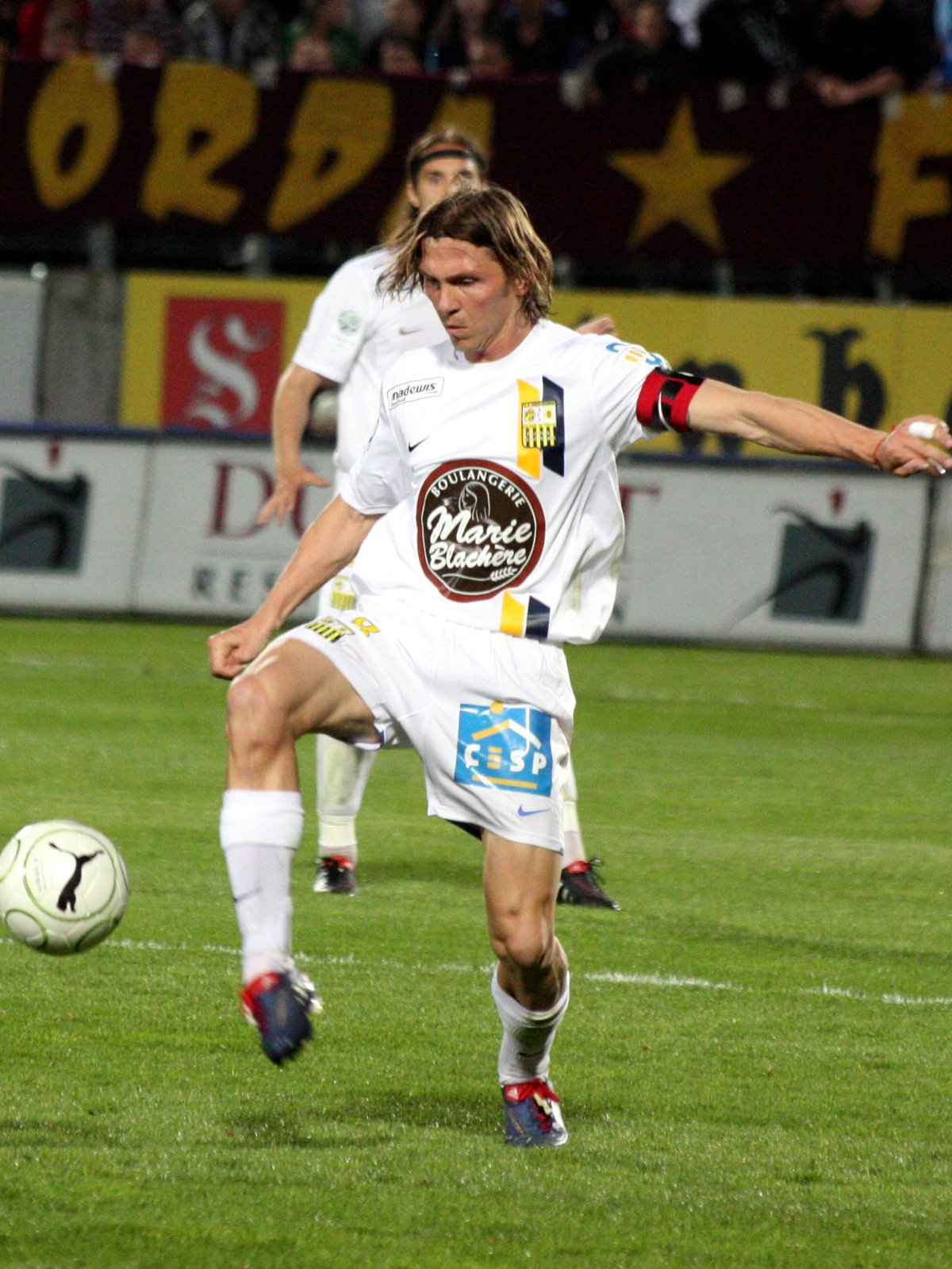
- Piocelle with Arles-Avignon in 2010

Personal information
- Date of birth: 10 November 1978 (age 47)
- Place of birth: Gouvieux, France
- Height: 1.80 m (5 ft 11 in)
- Position: Defensive midfielder

Team information
- Current team: Arles (sporting director)

Youth career
- 1994–1998: Nantes

Senior career*
Years	Team	Apps	(Gls)
1998–2001	Nantes	46	(0)
2000–2001	→ Bastia (loan)	22	(0)
2001–2005	Bastia	77	(0)
2005–2007	Crotone	63	(1)
2007–2008	Grosseto	6	(0)
2008	Verona	13	(0)
2009	Juve Stabia	6	(0)
2009–2011	Arles-Avignon	57	(1)
2011–2013	Nîmes	27	(0)
2013–2014	Le Pontet	17	(0)
Total		334	(2)

International career
1997	France U18		
1999–2000	France U21	5	(0)

Managerial career
- 2016–2017: ARC Cavaillon
- * Club domestic league appearances and goals

Sébastien Piocelle (born 10 November 1978) is a French former professional footballer who played as a defensive midfielder. He is the sporting director of AC Arles-Avignon.

== Playing career ==
Born in Gouvieux, Oise, Piocelle started his career at FC Nantes, where his made his debut on 16 October 1998, against Bordeaux.

He was loaned to league rival SC Bastia in September 2000 and the deal became permanent in summer 2001. He broke his right knee in February 2002 and again in February 2004, made him miss the rest of the 2001–02 and 2003–04 season.

In his last season for Bastia, he managed to return to football on 13 November 2004 against AS Saint-Étienne, but the club finished second from bottom and Piocelle left for Crotone of Serie B that summer.

In summer 2007, after Crotone fall to Serie C1, newly promoted Serie B club Grosseto signed Piocelle. He was then signed by Serie C1 club Verona, but failed to impress there and was consequently released on 24 June 2008.

On 29 June 2009, Arles-Avignon signed the French midfielder from Italian third division club S.S. Juve Stabia. He captained Arles-Avignon from 2009 to 2011.

Piocelle won the 1997 UEFA European Under-18 Championship with France.

== Coaching and managerial career ==
In May 2014, Piocelle worked in a recruitment role at . He left the position in January 2015

Ahead of the 2016–17 season, he was appointed manager of French club ARC Cavaillon. However, in December 2017, he left the position as manager to become the club's sporting director. He worked for the club until the end of the 2017–18 season, and then joined Olympique Mallemortais in May 2018, still as a sporting director. Alongside, he also worked as a consultant and TV commentator for French TV channel RMC Sport, which he joined at the end of 2017.

In July 2019, Piocelle was hired as sporting director by AC Arles-Avignon.

== Honours ==
Nantes

- Coupe de France: 1998–99
- Trophée des Champions: 1999
