= Chaouki Ben Saada =

Tunisian footballer (born 1984)

Personal information
- Full name: Chaouki Ben Saada
- Date of birth: 1 July 1984 (age 42)
- Place of birth: Bastia, France
- Height: 1.70 m (5 ft 7 in)
- Positions: Midfielder; forward

Youth career
- 1993–2001: Bastia

Senior career*
Years	Team	Apps	(Gls)
2001–2008	Bastia	170	(16)
2008–2011	Nice	80	(9)
2011–2012	Lens	35	(2)
2012–2014	Arles-Avignon	34	(2)
2014–2019	Troyes	95	(8)
2019–2022	Bastia	61	(7)

International career
2003–2004	France U21	5	(0)
2005–2010	Tunisia	38	(5)
- * Club domestic league appearances and goals

Chaouki Ben Saada (Arabic: شوقي بن سعادة; born 1 July 1984) is a French-born former professional footballer who played as a midfielder and forward for the Tunisia national team.

== Club career ==
Born in Bastia, France, Ben Saada made 170 appearances for Bastia, scoring 16 goals for the team.

On 2 July 2008, he signed with Ligue 1 side OGC Nice for €1.5 million along with teammate Kafoumba Coulibaly, agreeing to a three-year contract.

After a three-year stint with Nice, he signed a two-year deal with Ligue 2 outfit RC Lens on 24 August 2011.

In August 2012, Ben Saada moved to Ligue 2 club Arles-Avignon on a two-year contract. In October 2014, he then signed a one-year contract with Troyes AC, extending his stay in the Ligue 2.

== International career ==
Ben Saada played international football for France at youth level, earning an Under-17 World Championship medal in 2001. Since then, he adopted the Tunisian nationality of his parents, and first played for the national side in March 2005. He has won 12 international caps, scoring 1 goal (as of 7 June 2006). He was in the Tunisian squad for the 2006 African Cup of Nations, but was initially omitted from the squad for 2006 World Cup, before being called up to replace Issam Jomaa, who withdrew with a knee injury.

== Career statistics ==
=== International goals ===
Scores and results list Tunisia's goal tally first, score column indicates score after each Ben Saada goal.

List of international goals scored by Chaouki Ben Saada
No.	Date	Venue	Opponent	Score	Result	Competition
1	11 November 2005	Stade Sébastien Charléty, Paris, France	DR Congo	1–1	2–2	Friendly
2	27 January 2008	Tamale Stadium, Tamale, Ghana	South Africa	2–0	3–1	2008 African Cup of Nations
3	4 February 2008	Tamale Stadium, Tamale, Ghana	Cameroon	1–2	2–3	2008 African Cup of Nations
4	7 June 2008	Stade Linité, Victoria, Seychelles	Seychelles	2–0	2–0	2010 FIFA World Cup qualification (CAF)
5	21 June 2008	Stade 7 November, Radès, Tunisia	Burundi	1–0	2–1	2010 FIFA World Cup qualification (CAF)
