= Hervé Piccirillo =

French football referee

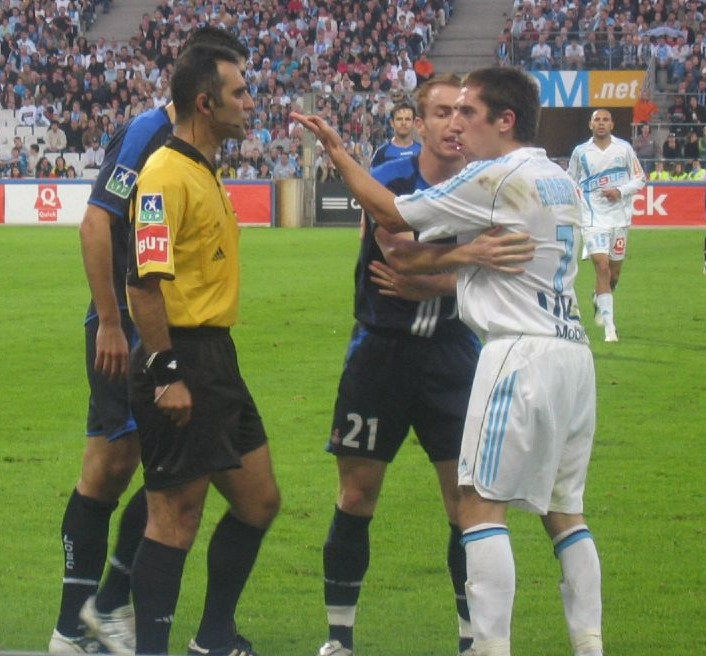
- Piccirillo in a confrontation with Franck Ribéry

Personal information
- Born: 6 March 1967 (age 59) Martigues, France
- Occupation: Football referee

Hervé Piccirillo (born 6 March 1967 in Martigues) is a French football referee. He has been a referee in the French Football Federation (FFF) since 1990 and became a FIFA referee in 2005, although he officiated one international friendly match between Morocco and Senegal in February 2003. He is no longer included on the FIFA list as of 2013.

Piccirillo served as a referee in UEFA Euro 2008 qualification and a fourth official in qualifying matches for the 2006 and 2010 World Cups.
