= Pierre Deblock =

French footballer (born 1973)

Personal information
- Date of birth: 1 May 1973 (age 53)
- Place of birth: Auchel, France
- Height: 1.78 m (5 ft 10 in)
- Position: Right midfielder

Youth career
- US Saint-Omer
- US Bomy
- Lens

Senior career*
Years	Team	Apps	(Gls)
1992–1994	Lens B	51	(2)
1994–1996	Amiens	55	(4)
1996–2000	Sedan	141	(20)
2000–2004	Auxerre	26	(1)
2001–2002	→ Bastia (loan)	13	(1)
2004–2005	Laval	33	(6)
2006–2008	La Vitréenne	20+ (Note: Statistics are missing for the 2006–07 season.)	(0+)
Total		339+	(35+)
- * Club domestic league appearances and goals

Pierre Deblock (born 1 May 1973) is a French former professional footballer who played as a right midfielder.

== Honours ==
Lens

- Coupe Gambardella: 1992

Sedan

- Coupe de France runner-up: 1998–99

Auxerre

- Coupe de France: 2002–03
- UEFA Intertoto Cup runner-up: 2000
