= Patrick Beneforti =

French footballer (born 1980)

Personal information
- Date of birth: 28 October 1980 (age 46)
- Place of birth: Bastia, France
- Height: 1.75 m (5 ft 9 in)
- Position: Midfielder

Youth career
- 1998–2001: Bastia

Senior career*
Years	Team	Apps	(Gls)
2001–2003	Bastia	28	(4)
2002–2003	→ Châteauroux (loan)	24	(0)
2003–2005	Istres	6	(0)
2005–2008	Gazélec Ajaccio	90	(11)
2008–2012	CA Bastia	88	(13)
2012–2016	Furiani-Agliani		
- * Club domestic league appearances and goals

Patrick Beneforti (born 28 October 1980) is a French former professional footballer who played as a midfielder.

He played on the professional level in Ligue 1 for SC Bastia and Ligue 2 for LB Châteauroux and FC Istres.

He played two matches for SC Bastia in the 2001 UEFA Intertoto Cup.
