= Nicolas Dieuze =

French footballer (born 1979)

Personal information
- Date of birth: 7 February 1979 (age 47)
- Place of birth: Albi, France
- Height: 1.86 m (6 ft 1 in)
- Position: Midfielder

Senior career*
Years	Team	Apps	(Gls)
1999–2001	Toulouse	24	(6)
2001–2003	Bastia	36	(2)
2003	→ Toulouse (loan)	14	(1)
2003–2008	Toulouse	157	(10)
2008–2009	Le Havre	34	(2)
2009–2011	Grenoble	70	(7)
2012–2015	Luzenac	71	(5)
Total		406	(33)
- * Club domestic league appearances and goals

Nicolas Dieuze (born 7 February 1979) is a French former professional footballer who played as a midfielder.

He signed for Grenoble from Le Havre AC on 31 July 2009.
