= Cyril Jeunechamp =

French former professional footballer (born 1975)

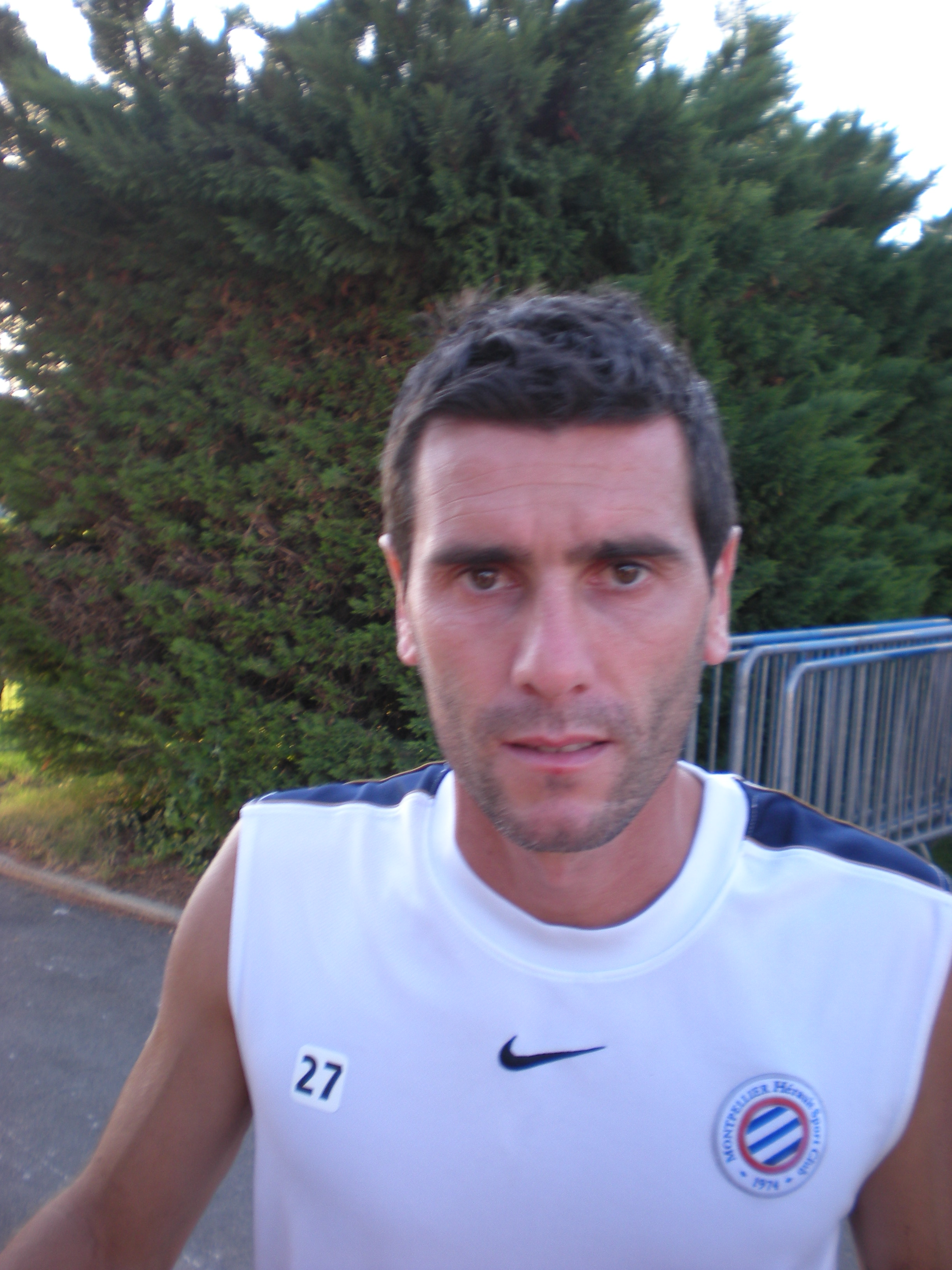
- Jeunechamp in 2012

Personal information
- Date of birth: 18 December 1975 (age 50)
- Place of birth: Nîmes, France
- Height: 1.77 m (5 ft 10 in)
- Positions: Right-back; midfielder

Team information
- Current team: Auxerre B (assistant)

Senior career*
Years	Team	Apps	(Gls)
1994–1997	Nîmes	39	(6)
1997–2001	Auxerre	113	(4)
2001–2002	Bastia	44	(1)
2002–2007	Rennes	138	(5)
2007–2009	Nice	41	(0)
2009–2013	Montpellier	91	(0)
2014–2015	Istres	31	(0)
Total		497	(16)

Managerial career
- 2016–2018: Castelnau Le Crès (youth coach)
- 2018–2020: Castelnau Le Crès (U-19 manager)
- 2020–2024: Bastia (U-19 manager)
- 2021: Bastia (interim manager)
- 2024–: Auxerre B (assistant)
- * Club domestic league appearances and goals

Cyril Jeunechamp (born 18 December 1975) is a French professional football coach and a former player. He played as a right-back or midfielder. He is currently the assistant coach of AJ Auxerre's B-team.

== Playing career ==
Born in Nîmes, Cyril Jeunechamp began his career at hometown club Nîmes Olympique, later playing for AJ Auxerre and SC Bastia when they made their way to the finals of the French Cup. In 2003, he joined Rennes, staying there for four years before moving to Côte d'Azur based side OGC Nice in 2007, he left the club on 30 June 2009.

On 18 June 2009, Montpellier HSC signed the Jeunechamp on a free transfer until June 2012. For the first time in the club's history, on 20 May 2012, it won the Ligue 1 title.

In December 2012, Jeunechamp was banned from football for a year for punching a journalist in the face following a Ligue 1 match against Valenciennes FC. The defender was unhappy with an article the reporter had written. He left Montpellier the following year and joined FC Istres, where he made 31 appearances before retiring in 2015, aged 39.

== Coaching career ==
In September 2021, he was briefly appointed caretaker manager for Bastia, following dismissal of Mathieu Chabert.

After several years as U-19 coach at Bastia, Jeunechamp moved to AJ Auxerre in June 2024, where he was appointed assistent coach of the clubs reserve/B-team under newly hired manager Sébastien Puygrenier.
