= Demetrius Ferreira =

Brazilian footballer (born 1974)

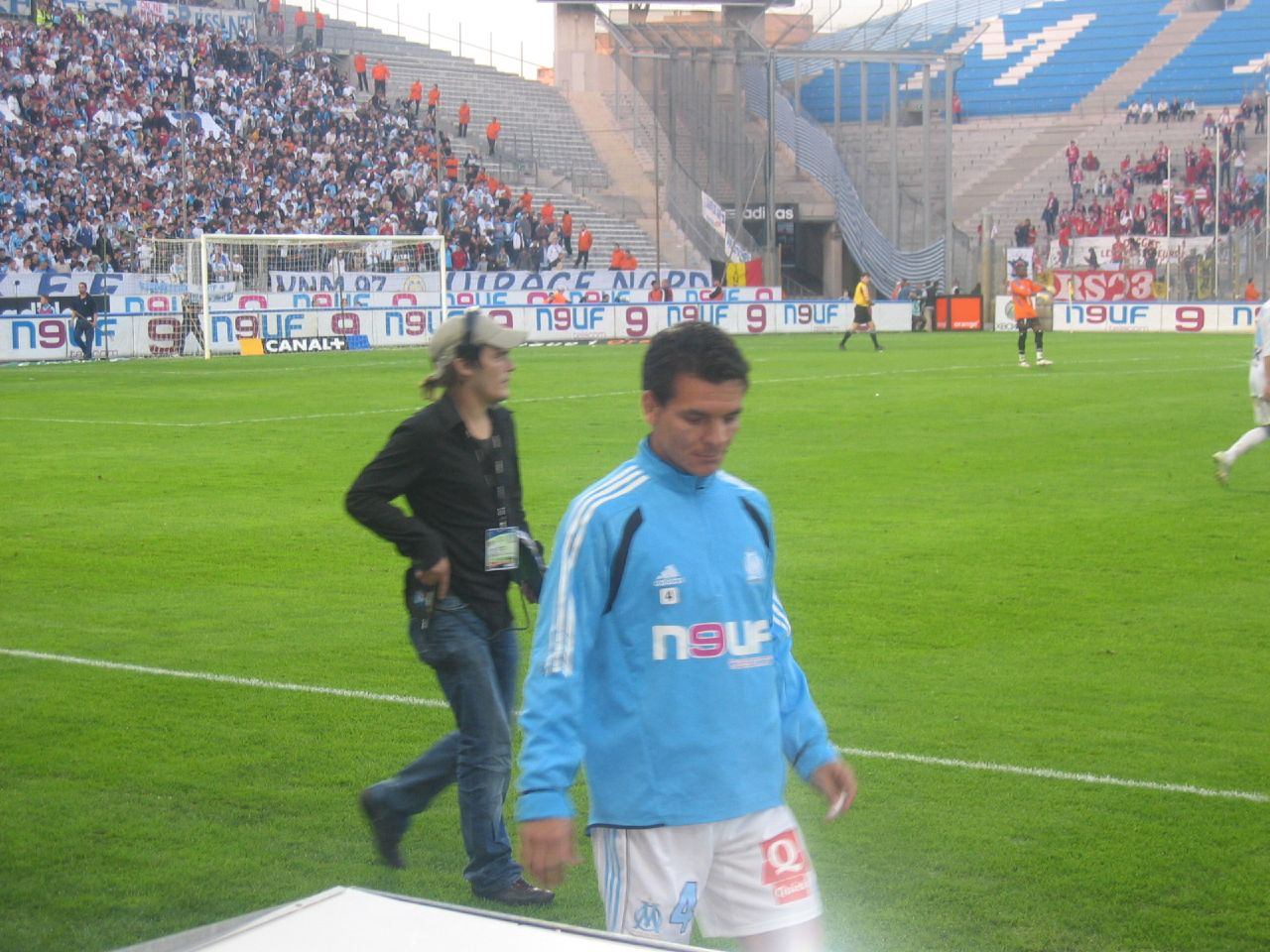
- Ferreira with Marseille in 2005

Personal information
- Full name: Demetrius Ferreira Leite
- Date of birth: 19 January 1974 (age 52)
- Place of birth: São Paulo, Brazil
- Height: 1.72 m (5 ft 8 in)
- Position: Right-back

Senior career*
Years	Team	Apps	(Gls)
1997–1998	Guarani		
1998–2000	Nancy	57	(1)
2000–2004	Bastia	96	(4)
2004–2006	Marseille	59	(2)
2006–2007	Troyes	24	(0)
2007–2008	Al Rayyan Club		
- * Club domestic league appearances and goals

Demetrius Ferreira Leite (born 19 January 1974) is a Brazilian former professional footballer who played as a right-back.

== Career ==
Efficient from his beginnings, the Brazilian knew his technical qualities shown notably in offensive stages. While he was traced by number of English clubs, the ex-Bastia defender chose to sign with Olympique de Marseille for two years in June 2004, having been on loan there since January 2004. His first complete season (2004–05) was mediocre, just like the team. Whilst at Marseille he started in the 2004 UEFA Cup Final.

In 2005–06, he played good matches before losing his place because of much more mediocre performances. He was later used merely to fill in at the end of match for injured or suspended players. His contract ended in June 2006. During the 2006–07 season, he played for Troyes AC in France.
