= Cédric Uras =

French footballer (born 1977)

Personal information
- Date of birth: 29 November 1977 (age 48)
- Place of birth: Lyon, France
- Height: 1.83 m (6 ft 0 in)
- Position: Defender

Senior career*
Years	Team	Apps	(Gls)
1996–2000	Lyon	66	(0)
2000–2001	Toulouse	34	(1)
2001–2005	Bastia	101	(1)
2005–2006	Clermont Foot	20	(0)
2006–2007	Falkirk	9	(0)
2007–2008	Litex Lovech	17	(1)
2008–2009	Ajaccio	13	(0)
2010–2011	Gueugnon	14	(0)
Total		274	(3)
- * Club domestic league appearances and goals

Cédric Uras (born 29 November 1977) is a French former footballer who played as a defender.

== Honours ==
- UEFA Intertoto Cup: 1997
