= UEFA Euro 2004 squads =

Football tournament

UEFA Euro 2004 was a football tournament that took place in Portugal between 12 June and 4 July 2004. The 16 teams that qualified for the competition were required to submit a final 23-man squad by 2 June 2004, although injured squad members could be replaced at any time up to 24 hours before their team's first match.

The players' ages, clubs, and caps were accurate as of 12 June 2004, the tournament's opening day.

== Group A ==
=== Greece ===
Manager: (Germany) Otto Rehhagel

Greece named their final squad on 23 May 2004.

No.	Pos.	Player	Date of birth (age)	Caps	Club
1	GK	Antonios Nikopolidis	14 January 1971 (aged 33)	42	(Greece) Panathinaikos
2	DF	Giourkas Seitaridis	4 June 1981 (aged 23)	18	(Greece) Panathinaikos
3	DF	Stylianos Venetidis	19 November 1976 (aged 27)	36	(Greece) Olympiacos
4	DF	Nikos Dabizas	3 August 1973 (aged 30)	67	(England) Leicester City
5	DF	Traianos Dellas	31 January 1976 (aged 28)	16	(Italy) Roma
6	MF	Angelos Basinas	3 January 1976 (aged 28)	42	(Greece) Panathinaikos
7	MF	Theodoros Zagorakis (captain)	27 October 1971 (aged 32)	88	(Greece) AEK Athens
8	MF	Stelios Giannakopoulos	12 July 1974 (aged 29)	36	(England) Bolton Wanderers
9	FW	Angelos Charisteas	9 February 1980 (aged 24)	26	(Germany) Werder Bremen
10	MF	Vasilios Tsiartas	12 November 1972 (aged 31)	57	(Greece) AEK Athens
11	FW	Demis Nikolaidis	17 September 1973 (aged 30)	50	(Spain) Atlético Madrid
12	GK	Kostas Chalkias	30 May 1974 (aged 30)	4	(Greece) Panathinaikos
13	GK	Fanis Katergiannakis	16 February 1974 (aged 30)	6	(Greece) Olympiacos
14	DF	Takis Fyssas	12 June 1973 (aged 31)	30	(Portugal) Benfica
15	FW	Zisis Vryzas	9 November 1973 (aged 30)	45	(Italy) Fiorentina
16	MF	Pantelis Kafes	24 June 1978 (aged 25)	18	(Greece) Olympiacos
17	MF	Georgios Georgiadis	8 March 1972 (aged 32)	57	(Greece) Olympiacos
18	DF	Giannis Goumas	24 May 1975 (aged 29)	27	(Greece) Panathinaikos
19	DF	Michalis Kapsis	18 October 1973 (aged 30)	8	(Greece) AEK Athens
20	MF	Giorgos Karagounis	6 March 1977 (aged 27)	30	(Italy) Internazionale
21	MF	Kostas Katsouranis	21 June 1979 (aged 24)	5	(Greece) AEK Athens
22	FW	Dimitrios Papadopoulos	20 September 1981 (aged 22)	6	(Greece) Panathinaikos
23	MF	Vasilios Lakis	10 September 1976 (aged 27)	29	(Greece) AEK Athens

=== Portugal ===
Manager: (Brazil) Luiz Felipe Scolari

Portugal named their final squad on 18 May 2004.

No.	Pos.	Player	Date of birth (age)	Caps	Club
1	GK	Ricardo	11 February 1976 (aged 28)	26	(Portugal) Sporting CP
2	DF	Paulo Ferreira	18 January 1979 (aged 25)	11	(Portugal) Porto
3	DF	Rui Jorge	27 March 1973 (aged 31)	42	(Portugal) Sporting CP
4	DF	Jorge Andrade	9 April 1978 (aged 26)	21	(Spain) Deportivo La Coruña
5	DF	Fernando Couto (captain)	2 August 1969 (aged 34)	106	(Italy) Lazio
6	MF	Costinha	1 December 1974 (aged 29)	23	(Portugal) Porto
7	MF	Luís Figo	4 November 1972 (aged 31)	103	(Spain) Real Madrid
8	MF	Petit	25 September 1976 (aged 27)	19	(Portugal) Benfica
9	FW	Pauleta	28 April 1973 (aged 31)	55	(France) Paris Saint-Germain
10	MF	Rui Costa	29 March 1972 (aged 32)	89	(Italy) Milan
11	FW	Simão	31 October 1979 (aged 24)	27	(Portugal) Benfica
12	GK	Quim	13 November 1975 (aged 28)	21	(Portugal) Braga
13	DF	Miguel	4 January 1980 (aged 24)	13	(Portugal) Benfica
14	DF	Nuno Valente	12 September 1974 (aged 29)	9	(Portugal) Porto
15	DF	Beto	3 May 1976 (aged 28)	30	(Portugal) Sporting CP
16	DF	Ricardo Carvalho	18 May 1978 (aged 26)	4	(Portugal) Porto
17	FW	Cristiano Ronaldo	5 February 1985 (aged 19)	6	(England) Manchester United
18	MF	Maniche	11 November 1977 (aged 26)	7	(Portugal) Porto
19	MF	Tiago	2 May 1981 (aged 23)	9	(Portugal) Benfica
20	MF	Deco	27 August 1977 (aged 26)	12	(Portugal) Porto
21	FW	Nuno Gomes	5 July 1976 (aged 27)	39	(Portugal) Benfica
22	GK	José Moreira	20 March 1982 (aged 22)	0	(Portugal) Benfica
23	FW	Hélder Postiga	2 August 1982 (aged 21)	6	(England) Tottenham Hotspur

=== Russia ===
Manager: Georgi Yartsev

Russia named their final squad on 2 June 2004. Aleksandr Mostovoi was sent home from the tournament on 15 June due to alleged attacks on the cohesion of the group. Caps include those for USSR, CIS, and Russia.

No.	Pos.	Player	Date of birth (age)	Caps	Club
1	GK	Sergei Ovchinnikov	10 November 1970 (aged 33)	31	(Russia) Lokomotiv Moscow
2	MF	Vladislav Radimov	26 November 1975 (aged 28)	29	(Russia) Zenit Saint Petersburg
3	FW	Dmitri Sychev	26 October 1983 (aged 20)	15	(Russia) Lokomotiv Moscow
4	MF	Alexey Smertin (captain)	1 May 1975 (aged 29)	40	(England) Portsmouth
5	MF	Andrei Karyaka	1 April 1978 (aged 26)	17	(Russia) Krylya Sovetov Samara
6	MF	Igor Semshov	6 April 1978 (aged 26)	6	(Russia) Torpedo Moscow
7	MF	Marat Izmailov	21 September 1982 (aged 21)	17	(Russia) Lokomotiv Moscow
8	MF	Rolan Gusev	17 September 1977 (aged 26)	25	(Russia) CSKA Moscow
9	FW	Dmitri Bulykin	20 November 1979 (aged 24)	8	(Russia) Dynamo Moscow
10	MF	Aleksandr Mostovoi	22 August 1968 (aged 35)	64	(Spain) Celta Vigo
11	FW	Aleksandr Kerzhakov	27 November 1982 (aged 21)	18	(Russia) Zenit Saint Petersburg
12	GK	Vyacheslav Malafeev	4 March 1979 (aged 25)	2	(Russia) Zenit Saint Petersburg
13	DF	Roman Sharonov	8 September 1976 (aged 27)	3	(Russia) Rubin Kazan
14	DF	Aleksandr Anyukov	28 September 1982 (aged 21)	1	(Russia) Krylya Sovetov Samara
15	MF	Dmitri Alenichev	20 October 1972 (aged 31)	50	(Portugal) Porto
16	DF	Vadim Evseev	8 January 1976 (aged 28)	9	(Russia) Lokomotiv Moscow
17	DF	Dmitri Sennikov	24 June 1976 (aged 27)	13	(Russia) Lokomotiv Moscow
18	FW	Dmitri Kirichenko	17 January 1977 (aged 27)	4	(Russia) CSKA Moscow
19	MF	Vladimir Bystrov	31 January 1984 (aged 20)	2	(Russia) Zenit Saint Petersburg
20	MF	Dmitri Loskov	12 February 1974 (aged 30)	13	(Russia) Lokomotiv Moscow
21	DF	Aleksei Bugayev	25 August 1981 (aged 22)	1	(Russia) Torpedo Moscow
22	MF	Evgeni Aldonin	22 January 1980 (aged 24)	12	(Russia) CSKA Moscow
23	GK	Igor Akinfeev	8 April 1986 (aged 18)	1	(Russia) CSKA Moscow

=== Spain ===
Manager: Iñaki Sáez

Spain named their initial 23-man squad on 20 May 2004. Real Madrid right-back Michel Salgado was originally named in the squad but suffered a torn thigh muscle and was replaced by Deportivo La Coruña full-back Joan Capdevila.

No.	Pos.	Player	Date of birth (age)	Caps	Club
1	GK	Santiago Cañizares	18 December 1969 (aged 34)	39	(Spain) Valencia
2	DF	Joan Capdevila	3 February 1978 (aged 26)	8	(Spain) Deportivo La Coruña
3	DF	Carlos Marchena	31 July 1979 (aged 24)	22	(Spain) Valencia
4	MF	David Albelda	1 September 1977 (aged 26)	23	(Spain) Valencia
5	DF	Carles Puyol	13 April 1978 (aged 26)	32	(Spain) Barcelona
6	DF	Iván Helguera	28 March 1975 (aged 29)	43	(Spain) Real Madrid
7	FW	Raúl (captain)	27 June 1977 (aged 26)	79	(Spain) Real Madrid
8	MF	Rubén Baraja	11 July 1975 (aged 28)	34	(Spain) Valencia
9	FW	Fernando Torres	20 March 1984 (aged 20)	9	(Spain) Atlético Madrid
10	FW	Fernando Morientes	5 April 1976 (aged 28)	36	(France) Monaco
11	FW	Albert Luque	11 March 1978 (aged 26)	9	(Spain) Deportivo La Coruña
12	DF	Gabri	10 February 1979 (aged 25)	9	(Spain) Barcelona
13	GK	Daniel Aranzubia	18 September 1979 (aged 24)	7	(Spain) Athletic Bilbao
14	MF	Vicente	16 July 1981 (aged 22)	25	(Spain) Valencia
15	DF	Raúl Bravo	14 April 1981 (aged 23)	11	(Spain) Real Madrid
16	MF	Xabi Alonso	25 November 1981 (aged 22)	12	(Spain) Real Sociedad
17	FW	Joseba Etxeberria	5 September 1977 (aged 26)	51	(Spain) Athletic Bilbao
18	DF	César Martín	3 April 1977 (aged 27)	9	(Spain) Deportivo La Coruña
19	MF	Joaquín	21 July 1981 (aged 22)	23	(Spain) Real Betis
20	MF	Xavi	25 January 1980 (aged 24)	26	(Spain) Barcelona
21	MF	Juan Carlos Valerón	17 June 1975 (aged 28)	42	(Spain) Deportivo La Coruña
22	DF	Juanito	23 July 1976 (aged 27)	7	(Spain) Real Betis
23	GK	Iker Casillas	20 May 1981 (aged 23)	39	(Spain) Real Madrid

== Group B ==
=== Croatia ===
Manager: Otto Barić

Croatia named their final squad on 2 June 2004. Goalkeeper Stipe Pletikosa sustained a thigh injury a few days before the beginning of the tournament, and so was withdrawn from the squad, with Vladimir Vasilj taking his place.

No.	Pos.	Player	Date of birth (age)	Caps	Club
1	GK	Vladimir Vasilj	6 July 1975 (aged 28)	2	(Croatia) Varteks
2	DF	Mario Tokić	23 July 1975 (aged 28)	15	(Austria) Grazer AK
3	DF	Josip Šimunić	18 February 1978 (aged 26)	27	(Germany) Hertha BSC
4	DF	Stjepan Tomas	6 March 1976 (aged 28)	37	(Turkey) Fenerbahçe
5	DF	Igor Tudor	16 April 1978 (aged 26)	39	(Italy) Juventus
6	DF	Boris Živković (captain)	15 November 1975 (aged 28)	36	(Germany) VfB Stuttgart
7	MF	Milan Rapaić	16 August 1973 (aged 30)	42	(Italy) Ancona
8	DF	Darijo Srna	1 May 1982 (aged 22)	18	(Ukraine) Shakhtar Donetsk
9	FW	Dado Pršo	5 November 1974 (aged 29)	12	(France) Monaco
10	MF	Niko Kovač	15 October 1971 (aged 32)	39	(Germany) Hertha BSC
11	FW	Tomislav Šokota	8 April 1977 (aged 27)	5	(Portugal) Benfica
12	GK	Tomislav Butina	30 March 1974 (aged 30)	14	(Belgium) Club Brugge
13	DF	Dario Šimić	12 November 1975 (aged 28)	67	(Italy) Milan
14	DF	Mato Neretljak	3 June 1979 (aged 25)	7	(Croatia) Hajduk Split
15	MF	Jerko Leko	9 April 1980 (aged 24)	19	(Ukraine) Dynamo Kyiv
16	MF	Marko Babić	28 January 1981 (aged 23)	16	(Germany) Bayer Leverkusen
17	FW	Ivan Klasnić	29 January 1980 (aged 24)	5	(Germany) Werder Bremen
18	FW	Ivica Olić	14 September 1979 (aged 24)	23	(Russia) CSKA Moscow
19	FW	Ivica Mornar	12 January 1974 (aged 30)	18	(England) Portsmouth
20	MF	Đovani Roso	17 November 1972 (aged 31)	15	(Israel) Maccabi Haifa
21	DF	Robert Kovač	6 April 1974 (aged 30)	38	(Germany) Bayern Munich
22	MF	Nenad Bjelica	20 August 1971 (aged 32)	7	(Germany) 1. FC Kaiserslautern
23	GK	Joey Didulica	14 October 1977 (aged 26)	1	Austria Wien

=== England ===
Manager: (Sweden) Sven-Göran Eriksson

England named their final squad on 17 May 2004.

No.	Pos.	Player	Date of birth (age)	Caps	Club
1	GK	David James	1 August 1970 (aged 33)	24	(England) Manchester City
2	DF	Gary Neville	18 February 1975 (aged 29)	63	(England) Manchester United
3	DF	Ashley Cole	20 December 1980 (aged 23)	26	(England) Arsenal
4	MF	Steven Gerrard	30 May 1980 (aged 24)	24	(England) Liverpool
5	DF	John Terry	7 December 1980 (aged 23)	8	(England) Chelsea
6	DF	Sol Campbell	18 September 1974 (aged 29)	58	(England) Arsenal
7	MF	David Beckham (captain)	2 May 1975 (aged 29)	68	(Spain) Real Madrid
8	MF	Paul Scholes	16 November 1974 (aged 29)	62	(England) Manchester United
9	FW	Wayne Rooney	24 October 1985 (aged 18)	13	(England) Everton
10	FW	Michael Owen	14 December 1979 (aged 24)	56	(England) Liverpool
11	MF	Frank Lampard	20 June 1978 (aged 25)	19	(England) Chelsea
12	DF	Wayne Bridge	5 August 1980 (aged 23)	17	(England) Chelsea
13	GK	Paul Robinson	15 October 1979 (aged 24)	5	(England) Tottenham Hotspur
14	DF	Phil Neville	21 January 1977 (aged 27)	48	(England) Manchester United
15	DF	Ledley King	12 October 1980 (aged 23)	5	(England) Tottenham Hotspur
16	DF	Jamie Carragher	28 January 1978 (aged 26)	12	(England) Liverpool
17	MF	Nicky Butt	21 January 1975 (aged 29)	35	(England) Manchester United
18	MF	Owen Hargreaves	20 January 1981 (aged 23)	19	(Germany) Bayern Munich
19	MF	Joe Cole	8 November 1981 (aged 22)	17	(England) Chelsea
20	MF	Kieron Dyer	29 December 1978 (aged 25)	22	(England) Newcastle United
21	FW	Emile Heskey	11 January 1978 (aged 26)	42	(England) Birmingham City
22	GK	Ian Walker	31 October 1971 (aged 32)	4	(England) Leicester City
23	FW	Darius Vassell	13 June 1980 (aged 23)	18	(England) Aston Villa

=== France ===
Manager: Jacques Santini

France named their final squad on 18 May 2004. Midfielder Ludovic Giuly tore a groin muscle during the 2004 UEFA Champions League Final on 26 May and was replaced by striker Sidney Govou three days later.

No.	Pos.	Player	Date of birth (age)	Caps	Club
1	GK	Mickaël Landreau	14 May 1979 (aged 25)	3	(France) Nantes
2	DF	Jean-Alain Boumsong	14 December 1979 (aged 24)	7	(France) Auxerre
3	DF	Bixente Lizarazu	9 December 1969 (aged 34)	93	(Germany) Bayern Munich
4	MF	Patrick Vieira	23 June 1976 (aged 27)	69	(England) Arsenal
5	DF	William Gallas	17 August 1977 (aged 26)	18	(England) Chelsea
6	MF	Claude Makélélé	18 February 1973 (aged 31)	34	(England) Chelsea
7	MF	Robert Pires	29 October 1973 (aged 30)	74	(England) Arsenal
8	DF	Marcel Desailly (captain)	7 September 1968 (aged 35)	114	(England) Chelsea
9	FW	Louis Saha	8 August 1978 (aged 25)	4	(England) Manchester United
10	MF	Zinedine Zidane	23 June 1972 (aged 31)	88	(Spain) Real Madrid
11	FW	Sylvain Wiltord	10 May 1974 (aged 30)	66	(England) Arsenal
12	FW	Thierry Henry	17 August 1977 (aged 26)	60	(England) Arsenal
13	DF	Mikaël Silvestre	9 August 1977 (aged 26)	30	(England) Manchester United
14	MF	Jérôme Rothen	31 March 1978 (aged 26)	5	(France) Monaco
15	DF	Lilian Thuram	1 January 1972 (aged 32)	99	(Italy) Juventus
16	GK	Fabien Barthez	28 June 1971 (aged 32)	66	(France) Marseille
17	MF	Olivier Dacourt	25 September 1974 (aged 29)	19	(Italy) Roma
18	MF	Benoît Pedretti	12 November 1980 (aged 23)	16	(France) Sochaux
19	DF	Willy Sagnol	18 March 1977 (aged 27)	24	(Germany) Bayern Munich
20	FW	David Trezeguet	15 October 1977 (aged 26)	50	(Italy) Juventus
21	FW	Steve Marlet	10 January 1974 (aged 30)	23	(France) Marseille
22	FW	Sidney Govou	27 July 1979 (aged 24)	12	(France) Lyon
23	GK	Grégory Coupet	31 December 1972 (aged 31)	8	(France) Lyon

=== Switzerland ===
Manager: Köbi Kuhn

Switzerland named an initial 26-man squad on 24 May 2004. Stéphane Grichting and Rémo Meyer were both cut from the final squad, while Marco Streller broke his left tibia and fibula and Léonard Thurre tore a calf muscle in training; they were replaced in the final 23-man squad by 18-year-old PSV Eindhoven forward Johan Vonlanthen.

On 6 June, midfielder Johann Lonfat was withdrawn from the squad after suffering a back injury; he was originally going to be replaced by Juventus forward Davide Chiumiento, but he declined the selection in favour of waiting for a call-up by Italy, meaning that Tranquillo Barnetta replaced Lonfat instead. Goalkeeper Fabrice Borer suffered a broken arm in training on 12 June and was replaced by Sébastien Roth before Switzerland's opening game against Croatia the next day.

No.	Pos.	Player	Date of birth (age)	Caps	Club
1	GK	Jörg Stiel (captain)	3 March 1968 (aged 36)	18	(Germany) Borussia Mönchengladbach
2	DF	Bernt Haas	8 April 1978 (aged 26)	30	(England) West Bromwich Albion
3	DF	Bruno Berner	21 November 1977 (aged 26)	16	(Germany) SC Freiburg
4	DF	Stéphane Henchoz	7 September 1974 (aged 29)	67	(England) Liverpool
5	DF	Murat Yakin	15 September 1974 (aged 29)	43	(Switzerland) Basel
6	MF	Johann Vogel	8 March 1977 (aged 27)	65	(Netherlands) PSV Eindhoven
7	MF	Ricardo Cabanas	17 January 1979 (aged 25)	19	(Switzerland) Grasshopper
8	DF	Raphaël Wicky	26 April 1977 (aged 27)	54	(Germany) Hamburger SV
9	FW	Alexander Frei	15 July 1979 (aged 24)	28	(France) Rennes
10	MF	Hakan Yakin	22 February 1977 (aged 27)	34	(Germany) VfB Stuttgart
11	FW	Stéphane Chapuisat	28 June 1969 (aged 34)	101	(Switzerland) Young Boys
12	GK	Pascal Zuberbühler	8 January 1971 (aged 33)	22	(Switzerland) Basel
13	DF	Marco Zwyssig	24 October 1971 (aged 32)	20	(Switzerland) Basel
14	DF	Ludovic Magnin	20 April 1979 (aged 25)	15	(Germany) Werder Bremen
15	MF	Daniel Gygax	28 August 1981 (aged 22)	4	(Switzerland) Zürich
16	MF	Fabio Celestini	31 October 1975 (aged 28)	28	(France) Marseille
17	DF	Christoph Spycher	30 March 1978 (aged 26)	8	(Switzerland) Grasshopper
18	MF	Benjamin Huggel	7 July 1977 (aged 26)	8	(Switzerland) Basel
19	MF	Tranquillo Barnetta	22 May 1985 (aged 19)	0	(Switzerland) St. Gallen
20	DF	Patrick Müller	17 December 1976 (aged 27)	45	(France) Lyon
21	FW	Milaim Rama	29 February 1976 (aged 28)	6	(Switzerland) Thun
22	FW	Johan Vonlanthen	1 February 1986 (aged 18)	2	(Netherlands) PSV Eindhoven
23	GK	Sébastien Roth	1 April 1978 (aged 26)	0	(Switzerland) Servette

== Group C ==
=== Bulgaria ===
Manager: Plamen Markov

Bulgaria named their squad on 19 May 2004.

No.	Pos.	Player	Date of birth (age)	Caps	Club
1	GK	Zdravko Zdravkov	4 October 1970 (aged 33)	65	(Bulgaria) Litex Lovech
2	DF	Vladimir Ivanov	6 February 1973 (aged 31)	4	(Bulgaria) Lokomotiv Plovdiv
3	DF	Rosen Kirilov	4 January 1973 (aged 31)	41	(Bulgaria) Litex Lovech
4	DF	Ivaylo Petkov	7 December 1975 (aged 28)	50	(Turkey) Fenerbahçe
5	DF	Zlatomir Zagorčić	15 June 1971 (aged 32)	22	(Bulgaria) Litex Lovech
6	DF	Kiril Kotev	8 April 1982 (aged 22)	1	(Bulgaria) Lokomotiv Plovdiv
7	MF	Daniel Borimirov	15 January 1970 (aged 34)	65	(Bulgaria) Levski Sofia
8	MF	Milen Petkov	12 January 1974 (aged 30)	38	(Greece) AEK Athens
9	FW	Dimitar Berbatov	30 January 1981 (aged 23)	31	(Germany) Bayer Leverkusen
10	MF	Velizar Dimitrov	13 April 1979 (aged 25)	12	(Bulgaria) CSKA Sofia
11	FW	Zdravko Lazarov	20 February 1976 (aged 28)	7	(Turkey) Gaziantepspor
12	GK	Stoyan Kolev	3 February 1976 (aged 28)	5	(Bulgaria) CSKA Sofia
13	DF	Georgi Peev	11 March 1979 (aged 25)	38	(Ukraine) Dynamo Kyiv
14	FW	Georgi Chilikov	23 August 1978 (aged 25)	5	(Bulgaria) Levski Sofia
15	MF	Marian Hristov	29 July 1973 (aged 30)	39	(Germany) 1. FC Kaiserslautern
16	FW	Vladimir Manchev	6 October 1977 (aged 26)	15	(France) Lille
17	MF	Martin Petrov	15 January 1979 (aged 25)	40	(Germany) VfL Wolfsburg
18	DF	Predrag Pažin	14 March 1973 (aged 31)	30	(Ukraine) Shakhtar Donetsk
19	MF	Stiliyan Petrov (captain)	5 July 1979 (aged 24)	49	(Scotland) Celtic
20	FW	Valeri Bojinov	15 February 1986 (aged 18)	2	(Italy) Lecce
21	FW	Zoran Janković	8 February 1974 (aged 30)	17	(China) Dalian Shide
22	DF	Ilian Stoyanov	20 January 1977 (aged 27)	24	(Bulgaria) Levski Sofia
23	GK	Dimitar Ivankov	30 October 1975 (aged 28)	27	(Bulgaria) Levski Sofia

=== Denmark ===
Manager: Morten Olsen

Denmark named their squad on 1 June 2004.

No.	Pos.	Player	Date of birth (age)	Caps	Club
1	GK	Thomas Sørensen	12 June 1976 (aged 28)	37	(England) Aston Villa
2	DF	Kasper Bøgelund	8 October 1980 (aged 23)	11	(Netherlands) PSV Eindhoven
3	DF	René Henriksen (captain)	27 August 1969 (aged 34)	62	(Greece) Panathinaikos
4	DF	Martin Laursen	26 July 1977 (aged 26)	36	(Italy) Milan
5	DF	Niclas Jensen	17 August 1974 (aged 29)	32	(Germany) Borussia Dortmund
6	DF	Thomas Helveg	24 June 1971 (aged 32)	88	(Italy) Internazionale
7	MF	Thomas Gravesen	11 March 1976 (aged 28)	45	(England) Everton
8	FW	Jesper Grønkjær	12 August 1977 (aged 26)	47	(England) Chelsea
9	FW	Jon Dahl Tomasson	29 August 1976 (aged 27)	61	(Italy) Milan
10	MF	Martin Jørgensen	6 October 1975 (aged 28)	50	(Italy) Udinese
11	FW	Ebbe Sand	19 July 1972 (aged 31)	63	(Germany) Schalke 04
12	MF	Thomas Kahlenberg	20 March 1983 (aged 21)	2	(Denmark) Brøndby
13	DF	Per Krøldrup	31 July 1979 (aged 24)	5	(Italy) Udinese
14	MF	Claus Jensen	29 April 1977 (aged 27)	30	(England) Charlton Athletic
15	MF	Daniel Jensen	25 June 1979 (aged 24)	7	(Spain) Real Murcia
16	GK	Peter Skov-Jensen	9 June 1971 (aged 33)	2	(Denmark) Midtjylland
17	MF	Christian Poulsen	28 February 1980 (aged 24)	19	(Germany) Schalke 04
18	DF	Brian Priske	14 May 1977 (aged 27)	6	(Belgium) Genk
19	FW	Dennis Rommedahl	22 July 1978 (aged 25)	42	(Netherlands) PSV Eindhoven
20	MF	Kenneth Perez	29 August 1974 (aged 29)	7	(Netherlands) AZ
21	FW	Peter Madsen	26 April 1978 (aged 26)	10	(Germany) VfL Bochum
22	GK	Stephan Andersen	26 November 1981 (aged 22)	1	(Denmark) AB
23	FW	Peter Løvenkrands	29 January 1980 (aged 24)	11	(Scotland) Rangers

=== Italy ===
Manager: Giovanni Trapattoni

Italy named their squad on 18 May 2004.

No.	Pos.	Player	Date of birth (age)	Caps	Club
1	GK	Gianluigi Buffon	28 January 1978 (aged 26)	41	(Italy) Juventus
2	DF	Christian Panucci	12 April 1973 (aged 31)	44	(Italy) Roma
3	DF	Massimo Oddo	14 June 1976 (aged 27)	13	(Italy) Lazio
4	MF	Cristiano Zanetti	14 April 1977 (aged 27)	20	(Italy) Internazionale
5	DF	Fabio Cannavaro (captain)	13 September 1973 (aged 30)	80	(Italy) Internazionale
6	DF	Matteo Ferrari	5 December 1979 (aged 24)	11	(Italy) Parma
7	FW	Alessandro Del Piero	9 November 1974 (aged 29)	63	(Italy) Juventus
8	MF	Gennaro Gattuso	9 January 1978 (aged 26)	29	(Italy) Milan
9	FW	Christian Vieri	12 July 1973 (aged 30)	40	(Italy) Internazionale
10	FW	Francesco Totti	27 September 1976 (aged 27)	40	(Italy) Roma
11	FW	Bernardo Corradi	30 March 1976 (aged 28)	10	(Italy) Lazio
12	GK	Francesco Toldo	2 December 1971 (aged 32)	28	(Italy) Internazionale
13	DF	Alessandro Nesta	19 March 1976 (aged 28)	62	(Italy) Milan
14	MF	Stefano Fiore	17 April 1975 (aged 29)	33	(Italy) Lazio
15	DF	Giuseppe Favalli	8 January 1972 (aged 32)	10	(Italy) Lazio
16	MF	Mauro Camoranesi	4 October 1976 (aged 27)	8	(Italy) Juventus
17	FW	Marco Di Vaio	15 July 1976 (aged 27)	12	(Italy) Juventus
18	FW	Antonio Cassano	12 July 1982 (aged 21)	3	(Italy) Roma
19	DF	Gianluca Zambrotta	19 February 1977 (aged 27)	41	(Italy) Juventus
20	MF	Simone Perrotta	17 September 1977 (aged 26)	17	(Italy) Chievo
21	MF	Andrea Pirlo	19 May 1979 (aged 25)	18	(Italy) Milan
22	GK	Angelo Peruzzi	16 February 1970 (aged 34)	26	(Italy) Lazio
23	DF	Marco Materazzi	19 August 1973 (aged 30)	14	(Italy) Internazionale

=== Sweden ===
Managers: Lars Lagerbäck & Tommy Söderberg

Sweden named their squad on 6 May 2004. Michael Svensson was ruled out of the tournament on 26 May after failing to recover from a knee injury and was replaced by another defender, Alexander Östlund.

No.	Pos.	Player	Date of birth (age)	Caps	Club
1	GK	Andreas Isaksson	3 October 1981 (aged 22)	20	(Sweden) Djurgården
2	DF	Teddy Lučić	15 April 1973 (aged 31)	62	(Germany) Bayer Leverkusen
3	DF	Olof Mellberg	3 September 1977 (aged 26)	45	(England) Aston Villa
4	DF	Johan Mjällby (captain)	9 February 1971 (aged 33)	41	(Scotland) Celtic
5	DF	Erik Edman	11 November 1978 (aged 25)	22	(Netherlands) Heerenveen
6	MF	Tobias Linderoth	21 April 1979 (aged 25)	36	(England) Everton
7	MF	Mikael Nilsson	24 June 1978 (aged 25)	17	(Sweden) Halmstads BK
8	MF	Anders Svensson	17 July 1976 (aged 27)	48	(England) Southampton
9	MF	Freddie Ljungberg	16 April 1977 (aged 27)	34	(England) Arsenal
10	FW	Zlatan Ibrahimović	3 October 1981 (aged 22)	24	(Netherlands) Ajax
11	FW	Henrik Larsson	20 September 1971 (aged 32)	32	(Scotland) Celtic
12	GK	Magnus Hedman	19 March 1973 (aged 31)	57	(Italy) Ancona
13	DF	Petter Hansson	14 December 1976 (aged 27)	7	(Netherlands) Heerenveen
14	DF	Alexander Östlund	2 November 1978 (aged 25)	6	(Sweden) Hammarby
15	DF	Andreas Jakobsson	6 October 1972 (aged 31)	33	(Denmark) Brøndby
16	MF	Kim Källström	24 August 1982 (aged 21)	19	(France) Rennes
17	MF	Anders Andersson	15 March 1974 (aged 30)	22	(Portugal) Belenenses
18	FW	Mattias Jonson	16 January 1974 (aged 30)	17	(Denmark) Brøndby
19	MF	Pontus Farnerud	4 June 1980 (aged 24)	9	(France) Strasbourg
20	FW	Marcus Allbäck	5 July 1973 (aged 30)	41	(England) Aston Villa
21	MF	Christian Wilhelmsson	8 December 1979 (aged 24)	10	(Belgium) Anderlecht
22	DF	Erik Wahlstedt	16 April 1976 (aged 28)	2	(Sweden) Helsingborg
23	GK	Magnus Kihlstedt	29 February 1972 (aged 32)	12	(Denmark) Copenhagen

== Group D ==
=== Czech Republic ===
Manager: Karel Brückner

The Czech Republic named an initial 24-man squad on 19 May 2004.

No.	Pos.	Player	Date of birth (age)	Caps	Club
1	GK	Petr Čech	20 May 1982 (aged 22)	20	(France) Rennes
2	DF	Zdeněk Grygera	14 May 1980 (aged 24)	22	(Netherlands) Ajax
3	DF	Pavel Mareš	18 January 1976 (aged 28)	6	(Russia) Zenit Saint Petersburg
4	MF	Tomáš Galásek	15 January 1973 (aged 31)	34	(Netherlands) Ajax
5	DF	René Bolf	25 February 1974 (aged 30)	22	(Czech Republic) Baník Ostrava
6	DF	Marek Jankulovski	9 May 1977 (aged 27)	33	(Italy) Udinese
7	MF	Vladimír Šmicer	24 May 1973 (aged 31)	68	(England) Liverpool
8	MF	Karel Poborský	30 March 1972 (aged 32)	95	(Czech Republic) Sparta Prague
9	FW	Jan Koller	30 March 1973 (aged 31)	52	(Germany) Borussia Dortmund
10	MF	Tomáš Rosický	4 October 1980 (aged 23)	36	(Germany) Borussia Dortmund
11	MF	Pavel Nedvěd (captain)	30 August 1972 (aged 31)	79	(Italy) Juventus
12	FW	Vratislav Lokvenc	27 September 1973 (aged 30)	60	(Germany) 1. FC Kaiserslautern
13	DF	Martin Jiránek	25 May 1979 (aged 25)	10	(Italy) Reggina
14	MF	Štěpán Vachoušek	26 July 1979 (aged 24)	15	(France) Marseille
15	FW	Milan Baroš	28 October 1981 (aged 22)	29	(England) Liverpool
16	GK	Jaromír Blažek	29 December 1972 (aged 31)	7	(Czech Republic) Sparta Prague
17	DF	Tomáš Hübschman	4 September 1981 (aged 22)	15	(Czech Republic) Sparta Prague
18	FW	Marek Heinz	4 August 1977 (aged 26)	12	(Czech Republic) Baník Ostrava
19	MF	Roman Týce	7 May 1977 (aged 27)	25	(Germany) 1860 Munich
20	MF	Jaroslav Plašil	5 January 1982 (aged 22)	2	(France) Monaco
21	DF	Tomáš Ujfaluši	24 March 1978 (aged 26)	29	(Germany) Hamburger SV
22	DF	David Rozehnal	5 July 1980 (aged 23)	6	(Belgium) Club Brugge
23	GK	Antonín Kinský	31 May 1975 (aged 29)	5	(Russia) Saturn Ramenskoye

=== Germany ===
Manager: Rudi Völler

Germany named an initial 22-man squad on 24 May 2004, with coach Rudi Völler leaving one space open for an under-21 player. Hamburger SV defender Christian Rahn withdrew from the squad on 26 May and was replaced by left-back Christian Ziege, who had recently been released by Tottenham Hotspur. VfL Bochum winger Paul Freier was also ruled out on 29 May after damaging knee ligaments in a warm-up friendly against Malta on 27 May; his withdrawal allowed both early contenders for the 23rd place in the squad, Bastian Schweinsteiger and Lukas Podolski, to be selected.

No.	Pos.	Player	Date of birth (age)	Caps	Club
1	GK	Oliver Kahn (captain)	15 June 1969 (aged 34)	73	(Germany) Bayern Munich
2	DF	Andreas Hinkel	26 March 1982 (aged 22)	11	(Germany) VfB Stuttgart
3	DF	Arne Friedrich	29 May 1979 (aged 25)	21	(Germany) Hertha BSC
4	DF	Christian Wörns	10 May 1972 (aged 32)	60	(Germany) Borussia Dortmund
5	DF	Jens Nowotny	11 January 1974 (aged 30)	43	(Germany) Bayer Leverkusen
6	DF	Frank Baumann	29 October 1975 (aged 28)	25	(Germany) Werder Bremen
7	MF	Bastian Schweinsteiger	1 August 1984 (aged 19)	7	(Germany) Bayern Munich
8	MF	Dietmar Hamann	27 August 1973 (aged 30)	55	(England) Liverpool
9	FW	Fredi Bobic	30 October 1971 (aged 32)	35	(Germany) Hertha BSC
10	FW	Kevin Kurányi	2 March 1982 (aged 22)	17	(Germany) VfB Stuttgart
11	FW	Miroslav Klose	9 June 1978 (aged 26)	43	(Germany) 1. FC Kaiserslautern
12	GK	Jens Lehmann	10 November 1969 (aged 34)	21	(England) Arsenal
13	MF	Michael Ballack	26 September 1976 (aged 27)	47	(Germany) Bayern Munich
14	FW	Thomas Brdarić	23 January 1975 (aged 29)	7	(Germany) Hannover 96
15	MF	Sebastian Kehl	13 February 1980 (aged 24)	24	(Germany) Borussia Dortmund
16	MF	Jens Jeremies	5 March 1974 (aged 30)	54	(Germany) Bayern Munich
17	DF	Christian Ziege	1 February 1972 (aged 32)	72	Unattached
18	MF	Fabian Ernst	30 May 1979 (aged 25)	12	(Germany) Werder Bremen
19	MF	Bernd Schneider	17 November 1973 (aged 30)	42	(Germany) Bayer Leverkusen
20	FW	Lukas Podolski	4 June 1985 (aged 19)	7	(Germany) 1. FC Köln
21	DF	Philipp Lahm	11 November 1983 (aged 20)	12	(Germany) VfB Stuttgart
22	MF	Torsten Frings	22 November 1976 (aged 27)	32	(Germany) Borussia Dortmund
23	GK	Timo Hildebrand	5 April 1979 (aged 25)	2	(Germany) VfB Stuttgart

=== Latvia ===
Manager: Aleksandrs Starkovs

Latvia named their squad on 29 May 2004.

No.	Pos.	Player	Date of birth (age)	Caps	Club
1	GK	Aleksandrs Koliņko	18 June 1975 (aged 28)	48	(Russia) Rostov
2	DF	Igors Stepanovs	21 January 1976 (aged 28)	68	(Belgium) Beveren
3	MF	Vitālijs Astafjevs (captain)	3 April 1971 (aged 33)	102	(Austria) Admira Wacker Mödling
4	DF	Mihails Zemļinskis	21 December 1969 (aged 34)	93	(Latvia) Skonto
5	MF	Juris Laizāns	6 January 1979 (aged 25)	54	(Russia) CSKA Moscow
6	DF	Oļegs Blagonadeždins	16 May 1973 (aged 31)	65	(Latvia) Skonto
7	DF	Aleksandrs Isakovs	16 September 1973 (aged 30)	43	(Latvia) Skonto
8	MF	Imants Bleidelis	16 August 1975 (aged 28)	78	(Denmark) Viborg
9	FW	Māris Verpakovskis	15 October 1979 (aged 24)	32	(Ukraine) Dynamo Kyiv
10	MF	Andrejs Rubins	26 November 1978 (aged 25)	55	(Russia) Shinnik Yaroslavl
11	FW	Andrejs Prohorenkovs	5 February 1977 (aged 27)	10	(Israel) Maccabi Tel Aviv
12	GK	Andrejs Piedels	17 September 1970 (aged 33)	6	(Latvia) Skonto
13	MF	Jurģis Pučinskis	1 March 1973 (aged 31)	14	(Russia) Luch-Energiya Vladivostok
14	MF	Valentīns Lobaņovs	23 October 1971 (aged 32)	47	(Ukraine) Metalurh Zaporizhzhya
15	DF	Māris Smirnovs	2 June 1976 (aged 28)	3	(Latvia) Ventspils
16	DF	Dzintars Zirnis	25 April 1977 (aged 27)	18	(Latvia) Liepājas Metalurgs
17	FW	Marians Pahars	5 August 1976 (aged 27)	60	(England) Southampton
18	DF	Igors Korabļovs	23 November 1974 (aged 29)	12	(Latvia) Ventspils
19	MF	Andrejs Štolcers	7 August 1974 (aged 29)	76	(England) Fulham
20	GK	Andrejs Pavlovs	22 February 1979 (aged 25)	2	(Latvia) Skonto
21	FW	Mihails Miholaps	24 August 1974 (aged 29)	27	(Latvia) Skonto
22	DF	Artūrs Zakreševskis	7 August 1971 (aged 32)	46	(Latvia) Skonto
23	FW	Vīts Rimkus	21 June 1973 (aged 30)	46	(Latvia) Ventspils

=== Netherlands ===
Manager: Dick Advocaat

The Netherlands named their squad on 19 May 2004.

No.	Pos.	Player	Date of birth (age)	Caps	Club
1	GK	Edwin van der Sar	29 October 1970 (aged 33)	82	(England) Fulham
2	DF	Michael Reiziger	3 May 1973 (aged 31)	66	(Spain) Barcelona
3	DF	Jaap Stam	17 July 1972 (aged 31)	60	(Italy) Lazio
4	DF	Wilfred Bouma	15 June 1978 (aged 25)	10	(Netherlands) PSV Eindhoven
5	DF	Giovanni van Bronckhorst	5 February 1975 (aged 29)	34	(Spain) Barcelona
6	MF	Phillip Cocu	29 October 1970 (aged 33)	77	(Spain) Barcelona
7	MF	Andy van der Meyde	30 September 1979 (aged 24)	11	(Italy) Internazionale
8	MF	Edgar Davids	13 March 1973 (aged 31)	61	(Spain) Barcelona
9	FW	Patrick Kluivert	1 July 1976 (aged 27)	77	(Spain) Barcelona
10	FW	Ruud van Nistelrooy	1 July 1976 (aged 27)	31	(England) Manchester United
11	MF	Rafael van der Vaart	11 February 1983 (aged 21)	16	(Netherlands) Ajax
12	FW	Roy Makaay	9 March 1975 (aged 29)	13	(Germany) Bayern Munich
13	GK	Sander Westerveld	23 October 1974 (aged 29)	6	(Spain) Real Sociedad
14	MF	Wesley Sneijder	9 June 1984 (aged 20)	7	(Netherlands) Ajax
15	DF	Frank de Boer (captain)	15 May 1970 (aged 34)	110	(Scotland) Rangers
16	MF	Marc Overmars	29 March 1973 (aged 31)	82	(Spain) Barcelona
17	FW	Pierre van Hooijdonk	29 November 1969 (aged 34)	38	(Turkey) Fenerbahçe
18	DF	John Heitinga	15 November 1983 (aged 20)	6	(Netherlands) Ajax
19	MF	Arjen Robben	23 January 1984 (aged 20)	4	(Netherlands) PSV Eindhoven
20	MF	Clarence Seedorf	1 April 1976 (aged 28)	71	(Italy) Milan
21	MF	Paul Bosvelt	26 March 1970 (aged 34)	21	(England) Manchester City
22	MF	Boudewijn Zenden	15 August 1976 (aged 27)	51	(England) Middlesbrough
23	GK	Ronald Waterreus	25 August 1970 (aged 33)	6	(Netherlands) PSV Eindhoven

== Player representation ==
Players	Clubs
9	Bayern Munich, Barcelona, Juventus
8	Benfica, Internazionale, Milan, Chelsea, Manchester United, Arsenal
7	Panathinaikos, Porto, Lazio, Real Madrid, Liverpool, PSV Eindhoven, Skonto
6	Roma, AEK Athens, Lokomotiv Moscow, CSKA Moscow, VfB Stuttgart, Ajax, Borussia Dortmund
5	Werder Bremen, Deportivo La Coruña, Zenit Saint Petersburg, Valencia, Bayer Leverkusen
