= UEFA Euro 2004 statistics =

These are the statistics for the Euro 2004 in Portugal.

== Goalscorers ==
There were 77 goals scored in 31 matches, for an average of 2.48 goals per match.

5 goals

- (Czech Republic) Milan Baroš

4 goals

- (England) Wayne Rooney
- (Netherlands) Ruud van Nistelrooy

3 goals

- (Denmark) Jon Dahl Tomasson
- (England) Frank Lampard
- (France) Zinedine Zidane
- (Greece) Angelos Charisteas
- (Sweden) Henrik Larsson

2 goals

- (Czech Republic) Marek Heinz
- (Czech Republic) Jan Koller
- (France) Thierry Henry
- (Italy) Antonio Cassano
- (Portugal) Rui Costa
- (Portugal) Maniche
- (Portugal) Cristiano Ronaldo
- (Sweden) Zlatan Ibrahimović

1 goal

- (Bulgaria) Martin Petrov
- (Croatia) Niko Kovač
- (Croatia) Dado Pršo
- (Croatia) Milan Rapaić
- (Croatia) Igor Tudor
- (Czech Republic) Vladimír Šmicer
- (Denmark) Jesper Grønkjær
- (England) Steven Gerrard
- (England) Michael Owen
- (England) Paul Scholes
- (France) David Trezeguet
- (Germany) Michael Ballack
- (Germany) Torsten Frings
- (Greece) Angelos Basinas
- (Greece) Traianos Dellas
- (Greece) Giorgos Karagounis
- (Greece) Zisis Vryzas
- (Italy) Simone Perrotta
- (Latvia) Māris Verpakovskis
- (Netherlands) Wilfred Bouma
- (Netherlands) Roy Makaay
- (Portugal) Nuno Gomes
- (Portugal) Hélder Postiga
- (Russia) Dmitri Bulykin
- (Russia) Dmitri Kirichenko
- (Spain) Fernando Morientes
- (Spain) Juan Carlos Valerón
- (Sweden) Marcus Allbäck
- (Sweden) Mattias Jonson
- (Sweden) Freddie Ljungberg
- (Switzerland) Johan Vonlanthen

1 own goal

- (Croatia) Igor Tudor (against France)
- (Portugal) Jorge Andrade (against Netherlands)

Source: UEFA

== Penalty kicks ==
Not counting penalty shoot-outs, there were eight penalty kicks awarded during the tournament. England's David Beckham (in the match against France) was the only player who failed to convert his penalty.

Scored

- (Greece) Angelos Basinas in the first match against Portugal
- (France) Zinedine Zidane in a match against England
- (Croatia) Milan Rapaić in a match against France
- (Sweden) Zlatan Ibrahimović in a match against Bulgaria
- (Bulgaria) Martin Petrov in a match against Italy
- (Sweden) Henrik Larsson in a match against Denmark
- (Netherlands) Ruud van Nistelrooy in a match against Latvia

Missed

- (England) David Beckham in a match against France, saved by Fabien Barthez

== Awards ==
UEFA Team of the Tournament

Goalkeepers	Defenders	Midfielders	Forwards
(Czech Republic) Petr Čech (Greece) Antonios Nikopolidis	(England) Sol Campbell (England) Ashley Cole (Greece) Traianos Dellas (Greece) Giourkas Seitaridis (Italy) Gianluca Zambrotta (Portugal) Ricardo Carvalho (Sweden) Olof Mellberg	(Czech Republic) Pavel Nedvěd (England) Frank Lampard (France) Zinedine Zidane (Germany) Michael Ballack (Greece) Theodoros Zagorakis (Portugal) Luís Figo (Portugal) Maniche	(Czech Republic) Milan Baroš (Denmark) Jon Dahl Tomasson (England) Wayne Rooney (Greece) Angelos Charisteas (Netherlands) Ruud van Nistelrooy (Portugal) Cristiano Ronaldo (Sweden) Henrik Larsson

Golden Boot

- (Czech Republic) Milan Baroš (5 goals)

UEFA Player of the Tournament

- (Greece) Theodoros Zagorakis

== Scoring ==
- Total number of goals scored: 77
- Average goals per match: 2.48
- Top scorer(s): 5 – (Czech Republic) Milan Baroš
- Most goals scored by a team: 10 – Czech Republic, England
- Fewest goals scored by a team: 1 – Bulgaria, Latvia, Switzerland
- Most goals conceded by a team: 9 – Bulgaria
- Fewest goals conceded by a team: 2 – Italy, Spain
- First goal of the tournament: (Greece) Giorgos Karagounis vs. Portugal
- Last goal of the tournament: (Greece) Angelos Charisteas vs. Portugal
- Fastest goal in a match: 68 seconds – (Russia) Dmitri Kirichenko vs. Greece
- Latest goal in a match without extra time: 90+4 minutes – (Italy) Antonio Cassano vs. Bulgaria
- Latest goal in a match with extra time: 115 minutes – (England) Frank Lampard vs. Portugal

== Attendance ==
- Overall attendance: 1,162,762
- Average attendance per match: 37,508

== Wins and losses ==
- Most wins: 4 – Greece, Czech Republic, Portugal
- Fewest wins: 0 – Bulgaria, Croatia, Germany, Latvia, Switzerland
- Most losses: 3 – Bulgaria
- Fewest losses: 0 – Italy

== Discipline ==
Sanctions against foul play at UEFA Euro 2004 are in the first instance the responsibility of the referee, but when he deems it necessary to give a caution, or dismiss a player, UEFA keeps a record and may enforce a suspension. Referee decisions are generally seen as final. However, UEFA's disciplinary committee may additionally penalise players for offences unpunished by the referee.

=== Overview ===
==== Red cards ====
A player receiving a red card is automatically suspended for the next match. A longer suspension is possible if the UEFA disciplinary committee judges the offence as warranting it. In keeping with the FIFA Disciplinary Code (FDC) and UEFA Disciplinary Regulations (UDR), UEFA does not allow for appeals of red cards except in the case of mistaken identity. The FDC further stipulates that if a player is sent off during his team's final Euro 2004 match, the suspension carries over to his team's next competitive international(s). For Euro 2004 these were the qualification matches for the 2006 FIFA World Cup.

Any player who was suspended due to a red card that was earned in Euro 2004 qualifying was required to serve the balance of any suspension unserved by the end of qualifying either in the Euro 2004 finals (for any player on a team that qualified, whether he had been selected to the final squad or not) or in World Cup qualifying (for players on teams that did not qualify).

==== Yellow cards ====
Any player receiving a single yellow card during two of the three group stage matches plus the quarter-final match is suspended for the next match. A single yellow card does not carry over to the semi-finals. This means that no player will be suspended for final unless he gets sent off in semi-final or he is serving a longer suspension for an earlier incident. Suspensions due to yellow cards will not carry over to the World Cup qualifiers. Yellow cards and any related suspensions earned in the Euro 2004 qualifiers are neither counted nor enforced in the final tournament.

In the event a player is sent off for two bookable offences, only the red card is counted for disciplinary purposes. However, in the event a player receives a direct red card after being booked in the same match, then both cards are counted. If the player was already facing a suspension for two tournament bookings when he was sent off, this would result in separate suspensions that would be served consecutively. The one match ban for the yellow cards would be served first unless the player's team is eliminated in the match in which he was sent off. If the player's team is eliminated in the match in which he was serving his ban for the yellow cards, then the ban for the sending off would be carried over to the World Cup qualifiers.

==== Additional punishment ====
For serious transgressions, a longer suspension may be handed down at the discretion of the UEFA disciplinary committee. The disciplinary committee is also charged with reviewing any incidents that were missed by the officials and can award administrative red cards and suspensions accordingly. However, just as appeals of red cards are not considered, the disciplinary committee is also not allowed to review transgressions that were already punished by the referee with something less than a red card. For example, if a player is booked but not sent off for a dangerous tackle, the disciplinary committee cannot subsequently deem the challenge to be violent conduct and then upgrade the card to a red. However, if the same player then spits at the opponent but is still not sent off, then the referee's report would be unlikely to mention this automatic red card offence. Video evidence of the spitting incident could then be independently reviewed.

Unlike the rules in many domestic competitions, there is no particular category of red card offence that automatically results in a multi-game suspension. In general however, extended bans are only assessed for red cards given for serious foul play, violent conduct, spitting or perhaps foul and abusive language. Also, unlike many sets of domestic rules second and subsequent red cards also do not automatically incur an extended ban, although a player's past disciplinary record (including prior competition) might be considered by the disciplinary committee when punishing him. As a rule, only automatic red card offenses are considered for longer bans. A player who gets sent off for picking up two yellow cards in the same match will not have his automatic one-match ban extended by UEFA on account of what he did to get the second booking, because the referee has deemed him as not to have committed an automatic red card offense.

If UEFA suspends a player after his team's elimination from the tournament, or for more games than the team ends up playing without him prior to the final or their elimination (whichever comes first), then the remaining suspension must be served during World Cup qualifying. For a particularly grave offence UEFA has the power to impose a lengthy ban against the offender.

=== Disciplinary statistics ===
- Total number of yellow cards: (yellow card) 156
- Average yellow cards per match: 5.03
- Total number of red cards: (red card) 6
- Average red cards per match: 0.19
- First yellow card: Costinha against Greece
- First red card: Roman Sharonov against Spain
- Most yellow cards: 18 – Greece
- Fewest yellow cards: 3 – Latvia
- Most yellow cards in a match: 9 – Spain vs. Russia, Bulgaria vs. Denmark, Switzerland vs. Croatia
- Most yellow cards by one referee: 19 – (Sweden) Anders Frisk

=== By individual ===
==== Red cards ====
Six red cards were shown over the course of the tournament's 31 matches, an average of 0.19 red cards per match.

1 red card

- (Bulgaria) Stiliyan Petrov
- (Netherlands) John Heitinga
- (Russia) Sergei Ovchinnikov
- (Russia) Roman Sharonov
- (Switzerland) Bernt Haas
- (Switzerland) Johann Vogel

==== Yellow cards ====
156 yellow cards were shown over the course of the tournament's 31 matches, an average of 5.03 yellow cards per match

4 yellow cards

- (Greece) Giorgos Karagounis

3 yellow cards

- (Greece) Giourkas Seitardis
- (Portugal) Costinha
- (Russia) Roman Sharonov

2 yellow cards

- (Bulgaria) Rosen Kirilov
- (Bulgaria) Martin Petrov
- (Bulgaria) Stiliyan Petrov
- (Bulgaria) Ilian Stoyanov
- (Czech Republic) Tomáš Galásek
- (Greece) Zisis Vryzas
- (Greece) Theodoros Zagorakis
- (Italy) Fabio Cannavaro
- (Italy) Gennaro Gattuso
- (Netherlands) John Heitinga
- (Portugal) Ricardo Carvalho
- (Portugal) Deco
- (Portugal) Pauleta
- (Portugal) Nuno Valente
- (Russia) Dmitri Alenichev
- (Russia) Vladislav Radimov
- (Russia) Alexey Smertin
- (Spain) Carlos Marchena
- (Sweden) Erik Edman
- (Sweden) Zlatan Ibrahimović
- (Sweden) Tobias Linderoth
- (Switzerland) Bernt Haas
- (Switzerland) Benjamin Huggel
- (Switzerland) Johann Vogel

1 yellow card

- (Bulgaria) Valeri Bojinov
- (Bulgaria) Marian Hristov
- (Bulgaria) Vladimir Ivanov
- (Bulgaria) Zoran Janković
- (Bulgaria) Zdravko Lazarov
- (Bulgaria) Ivaylo Petkov
- (Bulgaria) Zlatomir Zagorčić
- (Croatia) Nenad Bjelica
- (Croatia) Robert Kovač
- (Croatia) Jerko Leko

1 yellow card (cont.)

- (Croatia) Ivica Mornar
- (Croatia) Dado Pršo
- (Croatia) Milan Rapaić
- (Croatia) Đovani Roso
- (Croatia) Dario Šimić
- (Croatia) Darijo Srna
- (Croatia) Igor Tudor
- (Croatia) Boris Živković
- (Czech Republic) Milan Baroš
- (Czech Republic) Marek Jankulovski
- (Czech Republic) Pavel Nedvěd
- (Czech Republic) Vladimír Šmicer
- (Czech Republic) Roman Týce
- (Czech Republic) Tomáš Ujfaluši
- (Denmark) Kasper Bøgelund
- (Denmark) Thomas Gravesen
- (Denmark) Thomas Helveg
- (Denmark) Niclas Jensen
- (Denmark) Christian Poulsen
- (Denmark) Ebbe Sand
- (Denmark) Jon Dahl Tomasson
- (England) Steven Gerrard
- (England) David James
- (England) Frank Lampard
- (England) Gary Neville
- (England) Phil Neville
- (England) Wayne Rooney
- (England) Paul Scholes
- (France) Olivier Dacourt
- (France) Thierry Henry
- (France) Robert Pires
- (France) Louis Saha
- (France) Mikaël Silvestre
- (France) Patrick Vieira
- (France) Zinedine Zidane
- (Germany) Michael Ballack
- (Germany) Arne Friedrich
- (Germany) Torsten Frings
- (Germany) Dietmar Hamann
- (Germany) Kevin Kurányi
- (Germany) Philipp Lahm
- (Germany) Jens Nowotny

1 yellow card (cont.)

- (Germany) Christian Wörns
- (Greece) Angelos Basinas
- (Greece) Angelos Charisteas
- (Greece) Traianos Dellas
- (Greece) Takis Fyssas
- (Greece) Stelios Giannakopoulos
- (Greece) Kostas Katsouranis
- (Greece) Dimitrios Papadopoulos
- (Italy) Marco Materazzi
- (Italy) Francesco Totti
- (Italy) Gianluca Zambrotta
- (Latvia) Vitālijs Astafjevs
- (Latvia) Aleksandrs Isakovs
- (Latvia) Valentīns Lobaņovs
- (Netherlands) Frank de Boer
- (Netherlands) Phillip Cocu
- (Netherlands) Roy Makaay
- (Netherlands) Marc Overmars
- (Netherlands) Arjen Robben
- (Netherlands) Clarence Seedorf
- (Netherlands) Andy van der Meyde
- (Portugal) Luís Figo
- (Portugal) Nuno Gomes
- (Portugal) Cristiano Ronaldo
- (Russia) Evgeni Aldonin
- (Russia) Aleksandr Anyukov
- (Russia) Vadim Evseev
- (Russia) Rolan Gusev
- (Russia) Andrei Karyaka
- (Russia) Vyacheslav Malafeev
- (Spain) David Albelda
- (Spain) Rubén Baraja
- (Spain) Iván Helguera
- (Spain) Carlos Puyol
- (Sweden) Kim Källström
- (Sweden) Alexander Östlund
- (Switzerland) Fabio Celestini
- (Switzerland) Jörg Stiel
- (Switzerland) Raphaël Wicky
- (Switzerland) Hakan Yakin

=== By referee ===
Referee	Matches	Red	Yellow	Red Cards
(Sweden) Anders Frisk	4	0	19	
(Russia) Valentin Ivanov	3	1	15	1 second yellow
(Slovakia) Ľuboš Micheľ	3	0	15	
(France) Gilles Veissière	3	0	14	
(Italy) Pierluigi Collina	3	0	11	
(Portugal) Lucílio Batista	2	2	18	2 second yellows
(Spain) Manuel Mejuto González	2	1	10	1 second yellow
(Norway) Terje Hauge	2	1	9	1 straight red
(Switzerland) Urs Meier	2	0	11	
(England) Mike Riley	2	0	11	
(Germany) Markus Merk	2	0	7	
(Denmark) Kim Milton Nielsen	2	0	7	

=== By team ===
Team	Matches	Red	Yellow	Red Cards	Suspensions
Russia	3	2	15	S. Ovchinnikov vs Portugal	R. Sharonov vs Portugal; S. Ovchinnikov vs Greece; A. Smertin vs Greece
Switzerland	3	2	10	J. Vogel vs Croatia; B. Haas vs England	J. Vogel vs England; B. Haas vs France
Bulgaria	3	1	15	S. Petrov vs Denmark	S. Petrov vs Italy; R. Kirilov vs Italy
Netherlands	5	1	10		J. Heitinga vs Latvia
Greece	6	0	18		G. Karagounis vs Russia; Z. Vryzas vs France (quarter-final)
Portugal	6	0	14		Pauleta vs England (quarter-final)
Croatia	3	0	10		
Czech Republic	5	0	8		
Germany	5	0	8		
Sweden	4	0	8		T. Linderoth vs Denmark; E. Edman vs Netherlands (quarter-final)
Italy	3	0	8		F. Cannavaro vs Bulgaria; G. Gattuso vs Bulgaria
Denmark	4	0	7		
England	4	0	7		
France	4	0	7		
Spain	3	0	8		C. Marchena vs Portugal
Latvia	3	0	3		

== Clean sheets ==
- Most clean sheets (team): 3 – Greece
- Fewest clean sheets (team): 0 – Bulgaria, France, Russia
- UEFA Euro 2004 didn't have a third and fourth place match so teams eliminated in the semi-final came joint third.

== Overall statistics ==
In the following tables:

- **Pld** = total games played
- **W** = total games won
- **D** = total games drawn (tied)
- **L** = total games lost
- **Pts** = total points accumulated (teams receive three points for a win, one point for a draw and no points for a loss)
- **APts** = average points per game
- **GF** = total goals scored (goals for)
- **AGF** = average goals scored per game
- **GA** = total goals conceded (goals against)
- **AGA** = average goals conceded per game
- **GD** = goal difference (GF−GA)
- **CS** = clean sheets
- **ACS** = average clean sheets
- **YC** = yellow cards
- **AYC** = average yellow cards
- **RC** = red cards
- **ARC** = average red cards

BOLD indicates that this nation has the highest
Italics indicates the host nation

Nation	Pld	W	D	L	Pts	APts	GF	AGF	GA	AGA	GD	CS	ACS	YC	AYC	RC	ARC
Bulgaria	3	0	0	**3**	0	0	1	0.33	**9**	**3**	−8	0	0	15	**5**	1	0.33
Croatia	3	0	**2**	1	2	0.66	4	1.33	6	2	−2	1	0.33	10	3.33	0	0
Czech Republic	5	**4**	0	1	12	**2.40**	**10**	2	5	1	**+5**	1	0.20	8	1.60	0	0
Denmark	4	1	**2**	1	5	1.25	4	1	5	1.25	−1	2	**0.50**	7	1.75	0	0
England	4	2	0	2	6	1.50	**10**	**2.50**	6	1.50	+4	1	0.25	7	1.75	0	0
France	4	2	1	1	7	1.75	7	1.75	5	1.25	+2	0	0	7	1.75	0	0
Germany	3	0	**2**	1	2	0.66	2	0.66	3	1	−1	1	0.33	8	2.66	0	0
Greece	**6**	**4**	1	1	**13**	2	7	1.16	4	0.66	+3	**3**	**0.50**	**18**	3	0	0
Italy	3	1	**2**	0	5	1.66	3	1	2	0.66	+1	1	0.33	8	2.66	0	0
Latvia	3	0	1	2	1	0.33	1	0.33	5	1.66	−4	1	0.33	3	1	0	0
Netherlands	5	2	1	2	7	1.40	7	1.40	6	1.20	+1	2	0.40	10	2	1	0.20
Portugal	**6**	**4**	0	2	12	2	8	1.33	6	1	+2	2	0.33	14	2.33	0	0
Russia	3	1	0	2	3	1	2	0.66	4	1.33	−2	0	0	15	**5**	**2**	**0.66**
Spain	3	1	1	1	4	1.33	2	0.66	2	0.66	0	1	0.33	8	2.66	0	0
Sweden	4	1	**2**	1	5	1.25	8	2	3	1.33	**+5**	2	**0.50**	8	2	0	0
Switzerland	3	0	1	2	1	0.33	1	0.33	6	2	−5	1	0.33	10	3.33	**2**	**0.66**
**Total**	31	23	16	23	85	2.70	77	2.48	77	2.48	0	19	0.61	157	5.06	6	0.19
