= 2004–05 FC Lorient season =

FC Lorient
2004–05 season
- President: Marcel Le Mentec
- Head coach: Christian Gourcuff
- Stadium: Stade du Moustoir
- Ligue 2: 14th
- Coupe de France: Seventh round
- Coupe de la Ligue: First round
- Top goalscorer: League: Bakari Koné (24); All: Bakari Koné (24)
- Average home league attendance: 8,248
- Biggest win: Reims 1–4 Lorient; Lorient 3–0 Brest
- Biggest defeat: Niort 4–0 Lorient

FC Lorient played its 79th season in 2004–05; it was the club's third consecutive season in the second division of French football. In addition to the domestic league, Lorient participated in this season's edition of the Coupe de France and the Coupe de la Ligue. The season covered the period from 1 July 2004 to 30 June 2005.

== Players ==
=== First-team squad ===
Note: Flags indicate national team as defined under FIFA eligibility rules; some limited exceptions apply. Players may hold more than one non-FIFA nationality.

No.	Pos.	Nation	Player
—	GK	FRA	Guillaume Gauclin
—	GK	FRA	Stéphane Le Garrec
—	GK	FRA	Jean-Marc Le Rouzic
—	GK	SUI	Sébastien Roth
—	GK	FRA	Romain Salin
—	DF	FRA	Marc Boutruche
—	DF	SEN	Malick Diop
—	DF	FRA	Nicolas Flégeau
—	DF	FRA	Benjamin Genton
—	DF	FRA	Richard Martini
—	DF	FRA	Carl Medjani
—	DF	FRA	Jérémy Morel
—	DF	FRA	Grégoire Nadjior
—	DF	FRA	Anthony Scaramozzino
—	MF	FRA	Christophe Bastien
—	MF	FRA	Christophe Coué
—	MF	CIV	Mamadou Dansoko
—	MF	CIV	Garry Franchi

No.	Pos.	Nation	Player
—	MF	FRA	Vincent Gragnic
—	MF	FRA	Nicolas Hislen
—	MF	FRA	Sylvain Macé
—	MF	FRA	Joris Marveaux
—	MF	FRA	Stéphane Pedron
—	MF	FRA	Therry Racon
—	MF	FRA	Virgile Reset
—	MF	FRA	Diego Yesso
—	MF	ALG	Karim Ziani
—	FW	CIV	Serge Ayeli
—	FW	FRA	Manfa Camara
—	FW	FRA	André-Pierre Gignac
—	FW	CIV	Bakari Koné
—	FW	FRA	Sébastien Le Toux
—	FW	FRA	Cédric Ouattara
—	FW	BRA	Robson
—	FW	FRA	Ludovic Viltard

== Transfers ==
=== In ===
No.	Pos	Player	Transferred from	Fee	Date	Source
	MF	(Algeria) Karim Ziani	(France) Troyes	Loan	10 October 2004	
	GK	(Switzerland) Sébastien Roth	(Switzerland) Servette	Free	1 January 2005	
	DF	(France) Anthony Scaramozzino	(France) Nice	Loan	10 January 2005	

=== Out ===
No.	Pos	Player	Transferred to	Fee	Date	Source
	MF	(Ivory Coast) Tchiressoua Guel	(Turkey) MKE Ankaragücü	Free	19 July 2004	
	MF	(Ivory Coast) Nicolas Esceth-N'Zi	(France) Montpellier	Free	21 July 2004	

== Pre-season and friendlies ==
Win Draw Loss

8 July 2004 Friendly	Brest	0–2	Lorient	Plougonvelin
19:00 CEST (UTC+2)			Robson 38'; 88'

14 July 2004 Friendly	Lorient	1–2	Rennes	Carnac
18:00 CEST (UTC+2)	Dansoko 45'		Didot 19'; Monterrubio 43'

21 July 2004 Friendly	Lorient	1–0	Guingamp	Quiberon
19:00 CEST (UTC+2)	Bastien (pen.)

24 July 2004 Friendly	Lorient	2–1	Le Mans	Le Faouët
18:30 CEST (UTC+2)

31 July 2004 Friendly	Lorient	1–2	Marseille	Vannes
19:30 CEST (UTC+2)	Koné		Luyindula; Batlles

7 February 2005 Friendly	Lorient	0–0	Togo	Lorient
CET (UTC+1)				Stadium: Stade du Moustoir

28 April 2005 Friendly	Lorient	1–0	Guingamp	Pontivy
19:00 CEST (UTC+2)	Medjani

== Competitions ==
=== Overview ===
Competition	First match	Last match	Starting round	Final position	Record							
Competition	First match	Last match	Starting round	Final position	Pld	W	D	L	GF	GA	GD	Win %
Ligue 2	6 August 2004	27 May 2005	Matchday 1	14	38	13	8	17	44	53	−9	34.21
Coupe de France	November 2004		Seventh round	Seventh round	1	0	0	1	0	1	−1	0.00
Coupe de la Ligue	6 October 2004		First round	First round	1	0	0	1	1	2	−1	0.00
Total					40	13	8	19	45	56	−11	32.50

Source: Competitions

=== Ligue 2 ===
==== League table ====
Pos	Team	Pld	W	D	L	GF	GA	GD	Pts
8	Montpellier	38	15	10	13	44	39	+5	55
9	Brest	38	13	16	9	38	34	+4	55
10	Lorient	38	14	8	16	47	51	−4	50
11	Grenoble	38	12	12	14	45	50	−5	48
12	Gueugnon	38	12	12	14	30	40	−10	48

Source: Ligue 2

==== Results summary ====
Overall								Home						Away					
Pld	W	D	L	GF	GA	GD	Pts	W	D	L	GF	GA	GD	W	D	L	GF	GA	GD
38	13	8	17	44	53	−9	47	9	3	7	29	24	+5	4	5	10	15	29	−14

==== Results by round ====
Round	1	2	3	4	5	6	7	8	9	10	11	12	13	14	15	16	17	18	19	20	21	22	23	24	25	26	27	28	29	30	31	32	33	34	35	36	37	38
Ground	A	H	A	H	A	H	A	A	H	A	H	A	H	A	H	A	H	A	H	A	H	A	H	A	H	H	A	H	A	H	A	H	A	H	A	H	A	H
Result	L	W	W	L	W	L	D	L	D	L	L	L	W	W	L	L	W	W	W	L	L	D	L	L	D	D	D	L	D	W	L	W	L	W	L	W	D	W
Position	15	7	6	9	5	11	10	12	12	18	19	20	18	14	16	18	16	15	11	14	15	15	15	15	16	15	15	17	17	15	16	14	14	14	15	14	14	14

A = Away; H = Home; W = Win; D = Draw; L = Loss

==== Matches ====
The league fixtures were announced on 2 July 2004.

6 August 2004 1	Sedan	3–2	Lorient	Sedan
CEST (UTC+2)

13 August 2004 2	Lorient	2–1	Châteauroux	Lorient
CEST (UTC+2)				Stadium: Stade du Moustoir

17 August 2004 3	Montpellier	0–1	Lorient	Montpellier
CEST (UTC+2)

20 August 2004 4	Lorient	0–2	Dijon	Lorient
CEST (UTC+2)				Stadium: Stade du Moustoir

27 August 2004 5	Troyes	1–2	Lorient	Troyes
CEST (UTC+2)

3 September 2004 6	Lorient	1–2	Angers	Lorient
CEST (UTC+2)				Stadium: Stade du Moustoir

10 September 2004 7	Laval	0–0	Lorient	Laval
CEST (UTC+2)

17 September 2004 8	Nancy	1–0	Lorient	Tomblaine
CEST (UTC+2)

20 September 2004 9	Lorient	1–1	Guingamp	Lorient
CEST (UTC+2)				Stadium: Stade du Moustoir

25 September 2004 10	Niort	4–0	Lorient	Niort
CEST (UTC+2)

1 October 2004 11	Lorient	1–2	Amiens	Lorient
CEST (UTC+2)				Stadium: Stade du Moustoir

15 October 2004 12	Clermont	2–0	Lorient	Clermont
CEST (UTC+2)

22 October 2004 13	Lorient	3–1	Créteil	Lorient
CEST (UTC+2)				Stadium: Stade du Moustoir

29 October 2004 14	Reims	1–4	Lorient	Reims
CEST (UTC+2)

5 November 2004 15	Lorient	1–2	Le Mans	Lorient
CEST (UTC+2)				Stadium: Stade du Moustoir

12 November 2004 16	Gueugnon	2–1	Lorient	Gueugnon
CEST (UTC+2)

26 November 2004 17	Lorient	2–0	Le Havre	Lorient
CEST (UTC+2)				Stadium: Stade du Moustoir

3 December 2004 18	Grenoble	1–2	Lorient	Grenoble
CEST (UTC+2)

16 December 2004 19	Lorient	3–0	Brest	Lorient
CEST (UTC+2)				Stadium: Stade du Moustoir

11 January 2005 20	Châteauroux	3–0	Lorient	Châteauroux
CEST (UTC+2)

14 January 2005 21	Lorient	1–2	Montpellier	Lorient
CEST (UTC+2)				Stadium: Stade du Moustoir

21 January 2005 22	Dijon	0–0	Lorient	Dijon
CEST (UTC+2)

24 January 2005 23	Lorient	1–2	Troyes	Lorient
CEST (UTC+2)				Stadium: Stade du Moustoir

28 January 2005 24	Angers	2–0	Lorient	Angers
CEST (UTC+2)

4 February 2005 25	Lorient	1–1	Laval	Lorient
CEST (UTC+2)				Stadium: Stade du Moustoir

20 February 2005 26	Lorient	1–1	Nancy	Lorient
CEST (UTC+2)				Stadium: Stade du Moustoir

14 March 2005 27	Guingamp	1–1	Lorient	Guingamp
CEST (UTC+2)

4 March 2005 28	Lorient	0–3	Niort	Lorient
CEST (UTC+2)				Stadium: Stade du Moustoir

11 March 2005 29	Amiens	0–0	Lorient	Amiens
CEST (UTC+2)

18 March 2005 30	Lorient	1–0	Clermont	Lorient
CEST (UTC+2)				Stadium: Stade du Moustoir

1 April 2005 31	Créteil	2–0	Lorient	Créteil
CEST (UTC+2)

8 April 2005 32	Lorient	3–1	Reims	Lorient
CEST (UTC+2)				Stadium: Stade du Moustoir

15 April 2005 33	Le Mans	3–1	Lorient	Le Mans
CEST (UTC+2)

22 April 2005 34	Lorient	3–2	Gueugnon	Lorient
CEST (UTC+2)				Stadium: Stade du Moustoir

6 May 2005 35	Le Havre	3–1	Lorient	Le Havre
CEST (UTC+2)

13 May 2005 36	Lorient	2–0	Grenoble	Lorient
CEST (UTC+2)				Stadium: Stade du Moustoir

20 May 2005 37	Brest	0–0	Lorient	Brest
CEST (UTC+2)

27 May 2005 38	Lorient	2–1	Sedan	Lorient
CEST (UTC+2)				Stadium: Stade du Moustoir

=== Coupe de France ===
November 2004 Seventh round	US Changé	1–0	Lorient	TBD
CET (UTC+1)

=== Coupe de la Ligue ===
6 October 2004 First round	Lorient	1–2	Guingamp	Lorient
CEST (UTC+2)	Dahou 28'		Fauré 8'; Sikimić 45'	Stadium: Stade du Moustoir

== Statistics ==
=== Goalscorers ===
Rank	Pos	No.	Nat	Name	Primeira Liga	Taça de Portugal	Taça da Liga	Total
1	FW		(Ivory Coast)	Bakari Koné	24	0	0	24
2	FW		(France)	Christophe Bastien	5	0	0	5
2	FW		(Brazil)	Robson	5	0	0	5
Own goals					0	0	0	0
Totals					0	0	1	0
