= UEFA Euro 2004 Group D =

Football tournament group stage

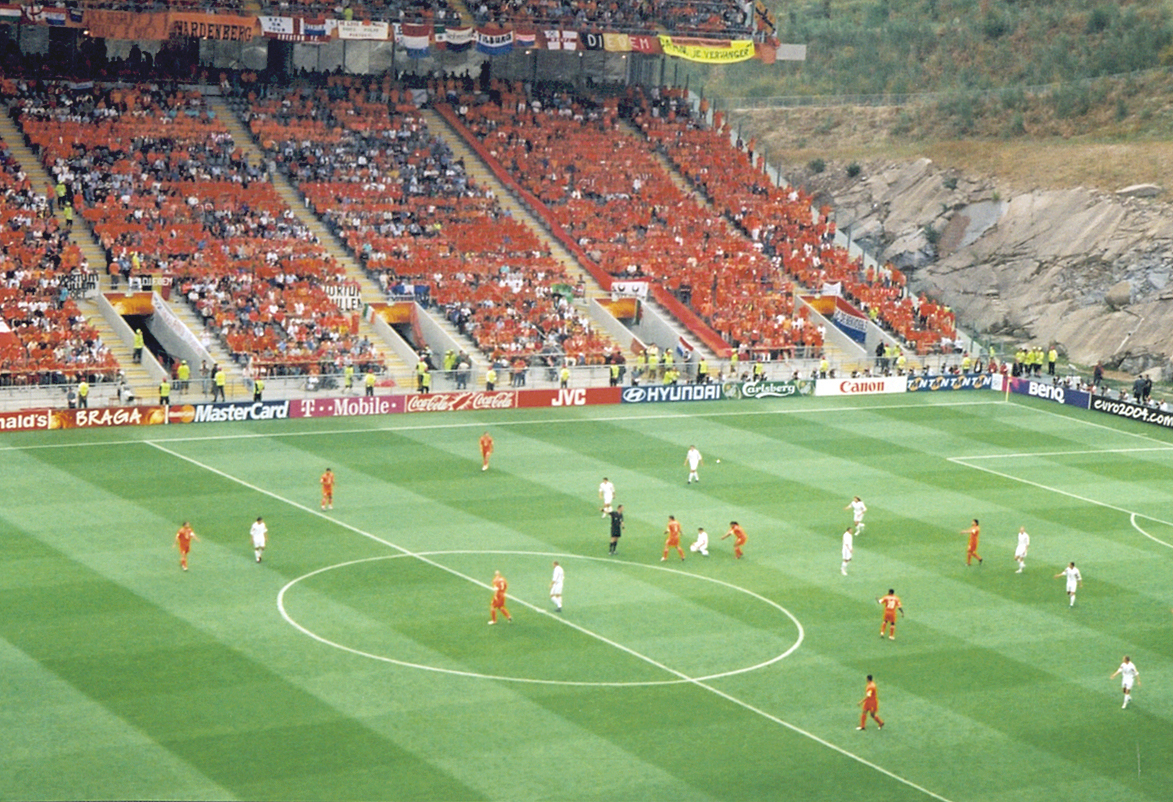
The match between the Netherlands and Latvia on 23 June at Estádio Municipal de Braga

Group D of UEFA Euro 2004 was one of four groups in the final tournament's initial group stage. It began on 15 June and was completed on 23 June. The group consisted of Germany, the Netherlands, the Czech Republic, and Latvia.

The Czech Republic won the group and advanced to the quarter finals, along with the Netherlands. Germany and Latvia failed to advance.

== Teams ==
Draw position	Team	Pot	Method of qualification	Date of qualification	Finals appearance	Last appearance	Previous best performance	UEFA Rankings November 2003 (Note: The UEFA rankings of November 2003 were used for seeding for the final draw.)	FIFA Rankings June 2004
D1	Czech Republic (Note: From 1960 to 1980, the Czech Republic competed as Czechoslovakia.)	1	Group 3 winner	10 September 2003	6th	2000	Winners (1976)	4	11
D2	Latvia	4	Play-off winner	19 November 2003	1st	—	Debut	32	53
D3	Germany (Note: From 1972 to 1988, Germany competed as West Germany.)	2	Group 5 winner	11 October 2003	9th	2000	Winners (1972, 1980, 1996)	9	8
D4	Netherlands	3	Play-off winner	19 November 2003	7th	2000	Winners (1988)	10	5

== Standings ==
Pos	Team	Pld	W	D	L	GF	GA	GD	Pts	Qualification
1	Czech Republic	3	3	0	0	7	4	+3	9	Advance to knockout stage
2	Netherlands	3	1	1	1	6	4	+2	4	Advance to knockout stage
3	Germany	3	0	2	1	2	3	−1	2	
4	Latvia	3	0	1	2	1	5	−4	1	

Source: UEFA
Rules for classification: Group stage tiebreakers

In the quarter-finals,

- The winner of Group D, Czech Republic, advanced to play the runner-up of Group C, Denmark.
- The runner-up of Group D, Netherlands, advanced to play the winner of Group C, Sweden.

== Matches ==
=== Czech Republic vs Latvia ===
15 June 2004
17:00

Czech Republic	2–1	Latvia
Baroš 73'; Heinz 85'	Report	Verpakovskis 45+1'

Estádio Municipal de Aveiro, Aveiro
Attendance: 21,744
Referee: Gilles Veissière (France)

Czech Republic	Latvia

GK	1	Petr Čech
RB	2	Zdeněk Grygera	(substituted off) 56'
CB	5	René Bolf
CB	21	Tomáš Ujfaluši
LB	6	Marek Jankulovski
DM	4	Tomáš Galásek	(substituted off) 64'
RM	8	Karel Poborský
CM	10	Tomáš Rosický
LM	11	Pavel Nedvěd (c)
CF	15	Milan Baroš	(substituted off) 87'
CF	9	Jan Koller
Substitutions:
FW	18	Marek Heinz	(substituted on) 56'
MF	7	Vladimír Šmicer	(substituted on) 64'
DF	13	Martin Jiránek	(substituted on) 87'
Manager:
Karel Brückner

GK	1	Aleksandrs Koliņko
RB	7	Aleksandrs Isakovs
CB	4	Mihails Zemļinskis
CB	2	Igors Stepanovs
LB	6	Oļegs Blagonadeždins
RM	8	Imants Bleidelis
CM	3	Vitālijs Astafjevs (c)
CM	14	Valentīns Lobaņovs	(substituted off) 90'
LM	10	Andrejs Rubins
CF	11	Andrejs Prohorenkovs	(substituted off) 71'
CF	9	Māris Verpakovskis	(substituted off) 81'
Substitutions:
MF	5	Juris Laizāns	(substituted on) 71'
FW	17	Marians Pahars	(substituted on) 81'
FW	23	Vīts Rimkus	(substituted on) 90'
Manager:
Aleksandrs Starkovs

Man of the Match:
Milan Baroš (Czech Republic)

Assistant referees:
Frédéric Arnault (France)
Serge Vallin (France)
Fourth official:
Kyros Vassaras (Greece)

=== Germany vs Netherlands ===
15 June 2004
19:45

Germany	1–1	Netherlands
Frings 30'	Report	Van Nistelrooy 81'

Estádio do Dragão, Porto
Attendance: 48,197
Referee: Anders Frisk (Sweden)

Germany	Netherlands

GK	1	Oliver Kahn (c)
RB	3	Arne Friedrich
CB	4	Christian Wörns
CB	5	Jens Nowotny
LB	21	Philipp Lahm
CM	8	Dietmar Hamann
CM	6	Frank Baumann
RW	19	Bernd Schneider		(substituted off) 68'
CM	13	Michael Ballack	(yellow card) 90+1'
LW	22	Torsten Frings		(substituted off) 79'
CF	10	Kevin Kurányi	(yellow card) 12'	(substituted off) 85'
Substitutions:
MF	7	Bastian Schweinsteiger		(substituted on) 68'
MF	18	Fabian Ernst		(substituted on) 79'
FW	9	Fredi Bobic		(substituted on) 85'
Manager:
Rudi Völler

GK	1	Edwin van der Sar
RB	18	John Heitinga		(substituted off) 74'
CB	3	Jaap Stam	(yellow card) 73'
CB	4	Wilfred Bouma
LB	5	Giovanni van Bronckhorst
CM	6	Phillip Cocu (c)	(yellow card) 29'
CM	8	Edgar Davids		(substituted off) 46'
RW	7	Andy van der Meyde
AM	11	Rafael van der Vaart
LW	22	Boudewijn Zenden		(substituted off) 46'
CF	10	Ruud van Nistelrooy
Substitutions:
MF	14	Wesley Sneijder		(substituted on) 46'
MF	16	Marc Overmars		(substituted on) 46'
FW	17	Pierre van Hooijdonk		(substituted on) 74'
Manager:
Dick Advocaat

Man of the Match:
Michael Ballack (Germany)

Assistant referees:
Kenneth Petersson (Sweden)
Peter Ekström (Sweden)
Fourth official:
Valentin Ivanov (Russia)

=== Latvia vs Germany ===
19 June 2004
17:00

Latvia	0–0	Germany
	Report

Estádio do Bessa, Porto
Attendance: 22,344
Referee: Mike Riley (England)

Latvia	Germany

GK	1	Aleksandrs Koliņko
RB	7	Aleksandrs Isakovs	(yellow card) 1'
CB	4	Mihails Zemļinskis
CB	2	Igors Stepanovs
LB	6	Oļegs Blagonadeždins
RM	8	Imants Bleidelis
CM	3	Vitālijs Astafjevs (c)	(yellow card) 79'
CM	14	Valentīns Lobaņovs		(substituted off) 70'
LM	10	Andrejs Rubins
CF	11	Andrejs Prohorenkovs		(substituted off) 67'
CF	9	Māris Verpakovskis		(substituted off) 90+2'
Substitutions:
FW	17	Marians Pahars		(substituted on) 67'
MF	5	Juris Laizāns		(substituted on) 70'
DF	16	Dzintars Zirnis		(substituted on) 90+2'
Manager:
Aleksandrs Starkovs

GK	1	Oliver Kahn (c)
RB	3	Arne Friedrich	(yellow card) 21'
CB	4	Christian Wörns
CB	6	Frank Baumann
LB	21	Philipp Lahm
RM	19	Bernd Schneider		(substituted off) 46'
CM	8	Dietmar Hamann	(yellow card) 42'
CM	13	Michael Ballack
LM	22	Torsten Frings	(yellow card) 53'
CF	9	Fredi Bobic		(substituted off) 67'
CF	10	Kevin Kurányi		(substituted off) 78'
Substitutions:
MF	7	Bastian Schweinsteiger		(substituted on) 46'
FW	11	Miroslav Klose		(substituted on) 67'
FW	14	Thomas Brdaric		(substituted on) 78'
Manager:
Rudi Völler

Man of the Match:
Michael Ballack (Germany)

Assistant referees:
Philip Sharp (England)
Glenn Turner (England)
Fourth official:
Alain Hamer (Luxembourg)

=== Netherlands vs Czech Republic ===
19 June 2004
19:45

Netherlands	2–3	Czech Republic
Bouma 4'; Van Nistelrooy 19'	Report	Koller 23'; Baroš 71'; Šmicer 88'

Estádio Municipal de Aveiro, Aveiro
Attendance: 29,935
Referee: Manuel Mejuto González (Spain)

Netherlands	Czech Republic

GK	1	Edwin van der Sar
RB	18	John Heitinga	(yellow card) 26' (yellow-red card) 75'
CB	3	Jaap Stam
CB	4	Wilfred Bouma
LB	5	Giovanni van Bronckhorst
CM	6	Phillip Cocu (c)
CM	20	Clarence Seedorf	(yellow card) 9'	(substituted off) 86'
CM	8	Edgar Davids
RW	7	Andy van der Meyde		(substituted off) 79'
LW	19	Arjen Robben		(substituted off) 58'
CF	10	Ruud van Nistelrooy
Substitutions:
MF	21	Paul Bosvelt		(substituted on) 58'
DF	2	Michael Reiziger		(substituted on) 79'
MF	11	Rafael van der Vaart		(substituted on) 86'
Manager:
Dick Advocaat

GK	1	Petr Čech
RB	2	Zdeněk Grygera		(substituted off) 25'
CB	13	Martin Jiránek
CB	21	Tomáš Ujfaluši
LB	6	Marek Jankulovski
RM	8	Karel Poborský
CM	10	Tomáš Rosický
CM	4	Tomáš Galásek	(yellow card) 55'	(substituted off) 62'
LM	11	Pavel Nedvěd (c)
CF	9	Jan Koller		(substituted off) 75'
CF	15	Milan Baroš
Substitutions:
MF	7	Vladimír Šmicer		(substituted on) 25'
FW	18	Marek Heinz		(substituted on) 62'
DF	22	David Rozehnal		(substituted on) 75'
Manager:
Karel Brückner

Man of the Match:
Pavel Nedvěd (Czech Republic)

Assistant referees:
Rafael Guerrero Alonso (Spain)
Oscar Martínez Samaniego (Spain)
Fourth official:
Pierluigi Collina (Italy)

=== Netherlands vs Latvia ===
23 June 2004
19:45

Netherlands	3–0	Latvia
Van Nistelrooy 27' (pen.), 35'; Makaay 84'	Report

Estádio Municipal de Braga, Braga
Attendance: 27,904
Referee: Kim Milton Nielsen (Denmark)

Netherlands	Latvia

GK	1	Edwin van der Sar
RB	2	Michael Reiziger
CB	3	Jaap Stam
CB	15	Frank de Boer (c)
LB	5	Giovanni van Bronckhorst
CM	20	Clarence Seedorf
CM	6	Phillip Cocu
CM	8	Edgar Davids	(substituted off) 77'
RW	7	Andy van der Meyde	(substituted off) 63'
LW	19	Arjen Robben
CF	10	Ruud van Nistelrooy	(substituted off) 70'
Substitutions:
MF	16	Marc Overmars	(substituted on) 63'
FW	12	Roy Makaay	(substituted on) 70'
MF	14	Wesley Sneijder	(substituted on) 77'
Manager:
Dick Advocaat

GK	1	Aleksandrs Koliņko
RB	7	Aleksandrs Isakovs
CB	4	Mihails Zemļinskis
CB	2	Igors Stepanovs
LB	6	Oļegs Blagonadeždins
RM	8	Imants Bleidelis		(substituted off) 83'
CM	14	Valentīns Lobaņovs	(yellow card) 53'
CM	3	Vitālijs Astafjevs (c)
LM	10	Andrejs Rubins
SS	11	Andrejs Prohorenkovs		(substituted off) 74'
CF	9	Māris Verpakovskis		(substituted off) 62'
Substitutions:
FW	17	Marians Pahars		(substituted on) 62'
MF	5	Juris Laizāns		(substituted on) 74'
MF	19	Andrejs Štolcers		(substituted on) 83'
Manager:
Aleksandrs Starkovs

Man of the Match:
Ruud van Nistelrooy (Netherlands)

Assistant referees:
Jens Larsen (Denmark)
Jørgen Jepsen (Denmark)
Fourth official:
Lucílio Batista (Portugal)

=== Germany vs Czech Republic ===
23 June 2004
19:45

Germany	1–2	Czech Republic
Ballack 21'	Report	Heinz 30'; Baroš 77'

Estádio José Alvalade, Lisbon
Attendance: 46,849
Referee: Terje Hauge (Norway)

Germany	Czech Republic

GK	1	Oliver Kahn (c)
CB	3	Arne Friedrich
CB	5	Jens Nowotny	(yellow card) 38'
CB	4	Christian Wörns	(yellow card) 83'
RM	22	Torsten Frings		(substituted off) 46'
CM	8	Dietmar Hamann		(substituted off) 79'
LM	21	Philipp Lahm	(yellow card) 74'
RW	19	Bernd Schneider
AM	13	Michael Ballack
LW	7	Bastian Schweinsteiger		(substituted off) 86'
CF	10	Kevin Kurányi
Substitutions:
FW	20	Lukas Podolski		(substituted on) 46'
FW	11	Miroslav Klose		(substituted on) 79'
MF	16	Jens Jeremies		(substituted on) 86'
Manager:
Rudi Völler

GK	16	Jaromír Blažek
RB	13	Martin Jiránek
CB	5	René Bolf
CB	22	David Rozehnal
LB	3	Pavel Mareš
CM	19	Roman Týce	(yellow card) 48'
CM	4	Tomáš Galásek (c)		(substituted off) 46'
RW	20	Jaroslav Plašil		(substituted off) 70'
AM	18	Marek Heinz
LW	14	Štěpán Vachoušek
CF	12	Vratislav Lokvenc		(substituted off) 59'
Substitutions:
DF	17	Tomáš Hübschman		(substituted on) 46'
FW	15	Milan Baroš		(substituted on) 59'
MF	8	Karel Poborský		(substituted on) 70'
Manager:
Karel Brückner

Man of the Match:
Marek Heinz (Czech Republic)

Assistant referees:
Ole Hermann Borgan (Norway)
Steinar Holvik (Norway)
Fourth official:
Stuart Dougal (Scotland)

== See also ==
- Czech Republic at the UEFA European Championship
- Germany at the UEFA European Championship
- Latvia at the UEFA European Championship
- Netherlands at the UEFA European Championship
