= Dansoko =

Dansoko is a surname. Notable people with the surname include:

- Bafodé Dansoko (born 1995), Guinean footballer
- Mamadou Dansoko (born 1982), Ivorian footballer
- Mohamed Lamine Dansoko (born 1998), Guinean sprinter
