= Latvia at the UEFA European Championship =

International football delegation

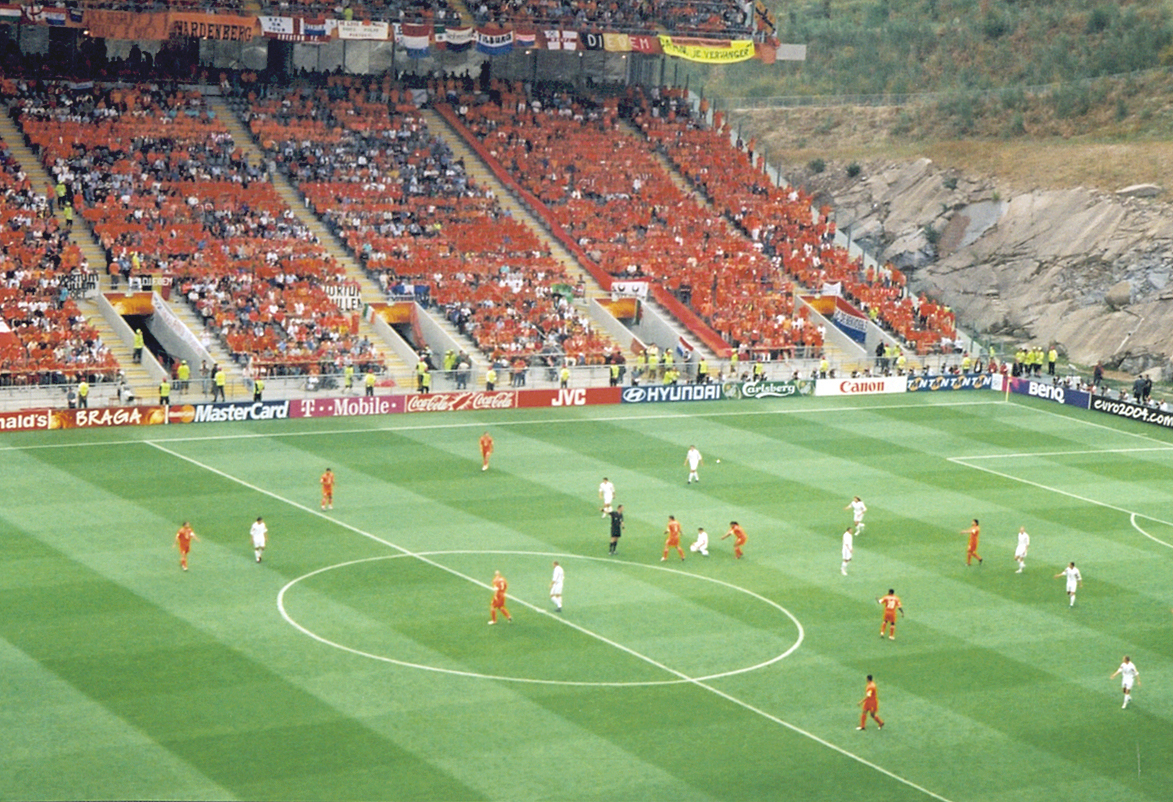
The UEFA Euro 2004 Group D match between the Netherlands and Latvia on 23 June at Estádio Municipal de Braga

Latvia have qualified for a UEFA European Championship once, the 2004 edition. After finishing second in their qualifying group, they won the two-legged play-offs against Turkey (3–2 on aggregate) to secure their first appearance in a major tournament finals. In doing so, Latvia became the first and so far only Baltic team to qualify for a European Championship.

At Euro 2004, Latvia were drawn in Group D, alongside Germany, the Czech Republic and the Netherlands. Latvia faced the Czech Republic in their opening match on 15 June 2004, with Māris Verpakovskis scoring before half-time. However, the Czechs would later come back to win the game 2–1. Four days later, Latvia earned a respectable 0–0 draw against World Cup runners-up Germany to earn their first point in a major tournament. They lost their final match 3–0 against the Netherlands, and were eliminated, finishing fourth in the group with one point from their draw and two losses.

== Overall record ==
UEFA European Championship record										Qualifying record					
Year	Result	Position	Pld	W	D*	L	GF	GA	Squad	Pld	W	D	L	GF	GA
(France) 1960	Part of the Soviet Union									Part of the Soviet Union					
(Spain) 1964	Part of the Soviet Union									Part of the Soviet Union					
(Italy) 1968	Part of the Soviet Union									Part of the Soviet Union					
(Belgium) 1972	Part of the Soviet Union									Part of the Soviet Union					
(Socialist Federal Republic of Yugoslavia) 1976	Part of the Soviet Union									Part of the Soviet Union					
(Italy) 1980	Part of the Soviet Union									Part of the Soviet Union					
(France) 1984	Part of the Soviet Union									Part of the Soviet Union					
(West Germany) 1988	Part of the Soviet Union									Part of the Soviet Union					
(Sweden) 1992	Part of the Soviet Union									Part of the Soviet Union					
(England) 1996	Did not qualify									10	4	0	6	11	20
(Belgium) (Netherlands) 2000	Did not qualify									10	3	4	3	13	12
(Portugal) 2004	Group stage	14th	3	0	1	2	1	5	Squad	10	6	2	2	13	8
(Austria) (Switzerland) 2008	Did not qualify									12	4	0	8	15	17
(Poland) (Ukraine) 2012	Did not qualify									10	3	2	5	9	12
(France) 2016	Did not qualify									10	0	5	5	6	19
(Europe) 2020	Did not qualify									10	1	0	9	3	28
(Germany) 2024	Did not qualify									8	1	0	7	5	19
(United Kingdom) (Republic of Ireland) 2028	To be determined									To be determined					
(Italy) (Turkey) 2032	To be determined									To be determined					
Total	Group stage	1/8	3	0	1	2	1	5	—	80	22	13	45	75	135

== Euro 2004 ==
=== Group stage ===
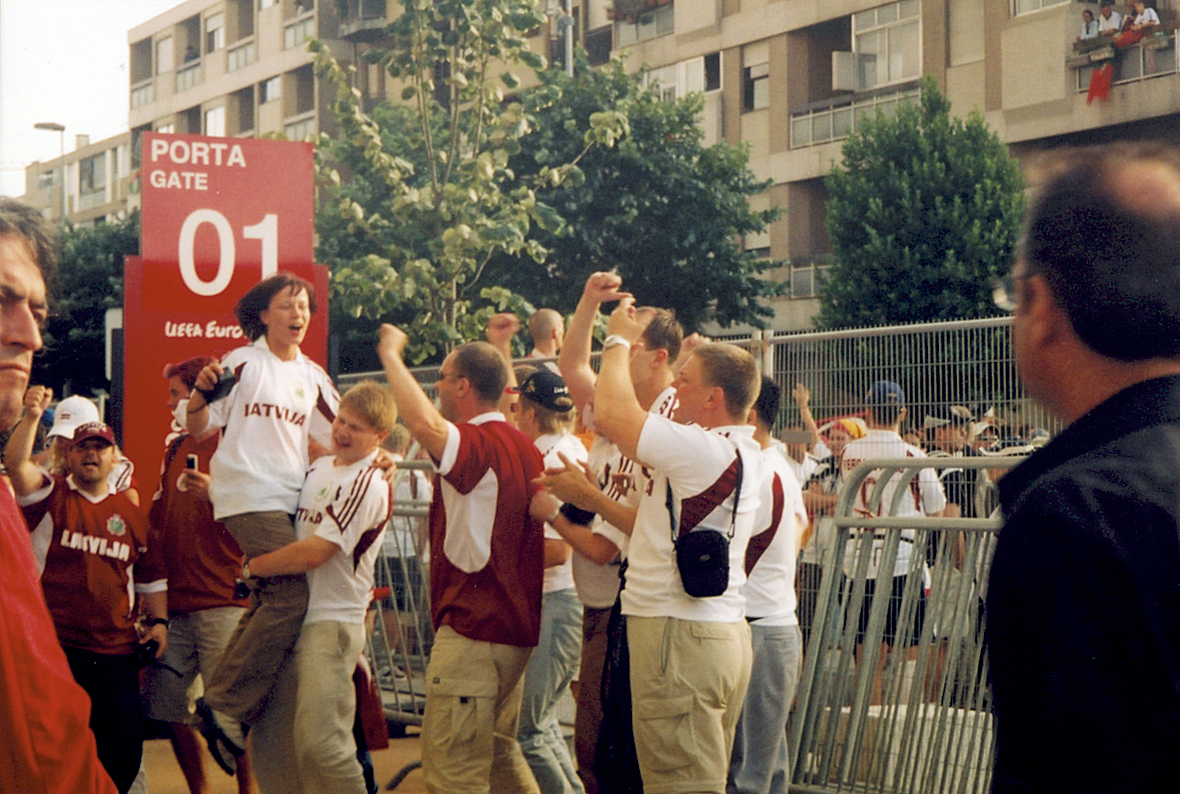
Latvian fans at Euro 2004

Pos	Team	Pld	W	D	L	GF	GA	GD	Pts	Qualification
1	Czech Republic	3	3	0	0	7	4	+3	9	Advance to knockout stage
2	Netherlands	3	1	1	1	6	4	+2	4	Advance to knockout stage
3	Germany	3	0	2	1	2	3	−1	2	
4	Latvia	3	0	1	2	1	5	−4	1	

Source: UEFA
Rules for classification: Group stage tiebreakers
15 June 2004
17:00

Czech Republic	2–1	Latvia
Baroš 73'; Heinz 85'	Report	Verpakovskis 45+1'

Estádio Municipal de Aveiro, Aveiro
Attendance: 21,744
Referee: Gilles Veissière (France)

19 June 2004
17:00

Latvia	0–0	Germany
	Report

Estádio do Bessa, Porto
Attendance: 22,344
Referee: Mike Riley (England)

23 June 2004
19:45

Netherlands	3–0	Latvia
Van Nistelrooy 27' (pen.), 35'; Makaay 84'	Report

Estádio Municipal de Braga, Braga
Attendance: 27,904
Referee: Kim Milton Nielsen (Denmark)

== See also ==
- Russia at the UEFA European Championship (records for Soviet Union)
