= Cédric Ouattara =

French footballer (born 1983)

Personal information
- Date of birth: 15 November 1983 (age 42)
- Place of birth: Amiens, France
- Height: 1.75 m (5 ft 9 in)
- Position: Striker

Team information
- Current team: USL Dunkerque

Senior career*
Years	Team	Apps	(Gls)
2004–2005	FC Lorient	5	(0)
2005–2007	SO Châtellerault		
2007–2008	FC Martigues		
2008–	USL Dunkerque		
- * Club domestic league appearances and goals as of 19:18, 23 November 2009 (UTC)

Cédric Ouattara (born 15 November 1983) is a French professional football player. Currently, he plays in the Championnat de France amateur for USL Dunkerque. He also holds Ivorian citizenship.

He played on the professional level in Ligue 2 for FC Lorient.
