= Fabrice Borer =

Swiss footballer (born 1971)

Personal information
- Date of birth: 24 December 1971 (age 54)
- Place of birth: Delémont, Switzerland
- Height: 1.83 m (6 ft 0 in)
- Position: Goalkeeper

Youth career
- SR Delémont

Senior career*
Years	Team	Apps	(Gls)
1991–1992	SR Delémont	32	(0)
1992–1995	Lausanne-Sport	22	(0)
1995–2002	Sion	156	(0)
2002–2005	Grasshoppers	79	(0)
2005–2007	Sion	49	(0)
Total		338	(0)

International career
2002	Switzerland	3	(0)
- * Club domestic league appearances and goals

Fabrice Borer (born 24 December 1971) is a Swiss former professional footballer who played as a goalkeeper.

== Career ==
Born in Delémont, Borer played for SR Delémont, FC Lausanne-Sport, FC Sion and Grasshopper Club Zürich. He also played three times for the Switzerland national team. He ended his career at the end of the 2006–07 Super League season.

He was initially named in Switzerland's UEFA Euro 2004 squad but had to withdraw through injury and was replaced by Sébastien Roth.
