= Garry Franchi =

Ivorian footballer (born 1983)

Personal information
- Date of birth: 3 December 1983 (age 42)
- Place of birth: Abidjan, Ivory Coast
- Height: 1.73 m (5 ft 8 in)
- Position: Midfielder

Team information
- Current team: Chartres

Youth career
- AS Arnouville
- FC Saint-Leu
- 1995–1998: INF Clarefontaine
- 1998–2003: Lorient

Senior career*
Years	Team	Apps	(Gls)
2003–2006	Lorient	11	(0)
2006–2007	L'Entente SSG	21	(0)
2007–2011	Orléans	56	(6)
2011–2013	Beauvais	56	(3)
2013–2014	Trélissac	6	(0)
2014–	Chartres	77	(10)
- * Club domestic league appearances and goals as of 21:02, 16 November 2017 (UTC)

Garry Franchi (born 3 December 1983) is an Ivorian professional footballer who plays in the Championnat National 1 for FC Chartres. His father is from Corsica and his mother from Morocco.

He played professionally in Ligue 2 for FC Lorient.

== Career ==
Franchi came through the junior systems of AS Arnouville and FC Saint-Leu, joining the National Technical Centre at Clairefontaine aged 12. After three years, he had offers to join four club academies, and chose FC Lorient.

He made his Ligue 2 debut for Lorient on 18 October 2003, coming on as a late substitute in a 2–0 away defeat to Caen. At the end of the season he signed a two-year professional contract with the club.

After leaving Lorient, Franchi joined Championnat National side L'Entente SSG. In July 2007 he joined US Orléans, where he stayed for four seasons, three in Championnat de France Amateur and the last in Championnat National. He moved on to AS Beauvais Oise in the summer of 2011.

In the summer of 2013, at the end of his contract, having featured in most league games for two seasons and despite a proposal from the club to extend his stay, Franchi elected to leave the club and join Trélissac. One season later he again moved to FC Chartres in Championnat National 3.
