= Sébastien Roth =

Swiss footballer (born 1978)

Personal information
- Date of birth: 1 April 1978 (age 48)
- Place of birth: Geneva, Switzerland
- Height: 1.85 m (6 ft 1 in)
- Position: Goalkeeper

Senior career*
| Years | Team | Apps | (Gls) |
| 1994–1997 | SR Delémont | 28 | (0) |
| 1998–2000 | FC Solothurn | 64 | (0) |
| 2000–2005 | Servette | 68 | (0) |
| 2005 | Lorient | 11 | (0) |
| 2006 | Yverdon-Sport | 4 | (0) |
| 2006–2007 | CS Chênois | 13 | (0) |
| 2007–2009 | Schaffhausen | 33 | (0) |
| 2009–2010 | FC Le Mont | 13 | (0) |
| Total | | 234 | (0) |

International career
| 2004 | Switzerland | 0 | (0) |
- * Club domestic league appearances and goals

Sébastien Roth (born 1 April 1978) is a Swiss former professional footballer who played as a goalkeeper.

== Club career ==
Roth played mostly for Servette. After the bankruptcy of Servette, he played half a year for FC Lorient and then for Yverdon-Sport, CS Chênois and FC Schaffhausen.

== International career ==
Roth was a last-minute injury replacement for Fabrice Borer at the 2004 UEFA European Championship, but did not play any match for the Switzerland national team.
