= Mamadou Dansoko =

Ivorian footballer (born 1982)

Personal information
- Date of birth: 31 July 1982 (age 44)
- Place of birth: Abidjan, Ivory Coast
- Height: 1.76 m (5 ft 9 in)
- Position: Winger

Youth career
- 1998–2002: Académie de Sol Beni

Senior career*
Years	Team	Apps	(Gls)
2001–2003	ASEC Mimosas		
2003–2007	Lorient	9	(0)
2006	→ Cherbourg (loan)	8	(0)
2007–2008	Al-Hissan		
- * Club domestic league appearances and goals

Mamadou 'Madinho' Dansoko (born 31 July 1982) is a former Ivorian professional footballer who played as a winger.

== Career ==
Dansoko was born in Abidjan of Guinean parents. He began his career at ASEC Abidjan, a club based in Ivory Coast which is famed for its Youth Academy started by Jean-Marc Guillou, playing alongside the likes of Kolo Touré.

In 2000, as an 18-year-old, he reportedly had trials with English club, Arsenal, along with Ivorian international Gilles Yapi Yapo. In 2003, he moved to Europe to join Ligue 1 outfit FC Lorient, where he made four appearances in four seasons. In 2007, he moved to United Arab Emirates club Al-Hissan. In June 2008, he trialled with French club Brest.

In the 2002 African Champions' Cup, he was the joint third-top scorer with five goals for ASEC, alongside fellow Ivorian Bakari Koné, who later joined him at FC Lorient before moving on to Ligue 1 club OGC Nice.
