= Roman Týce =

Czech footballer

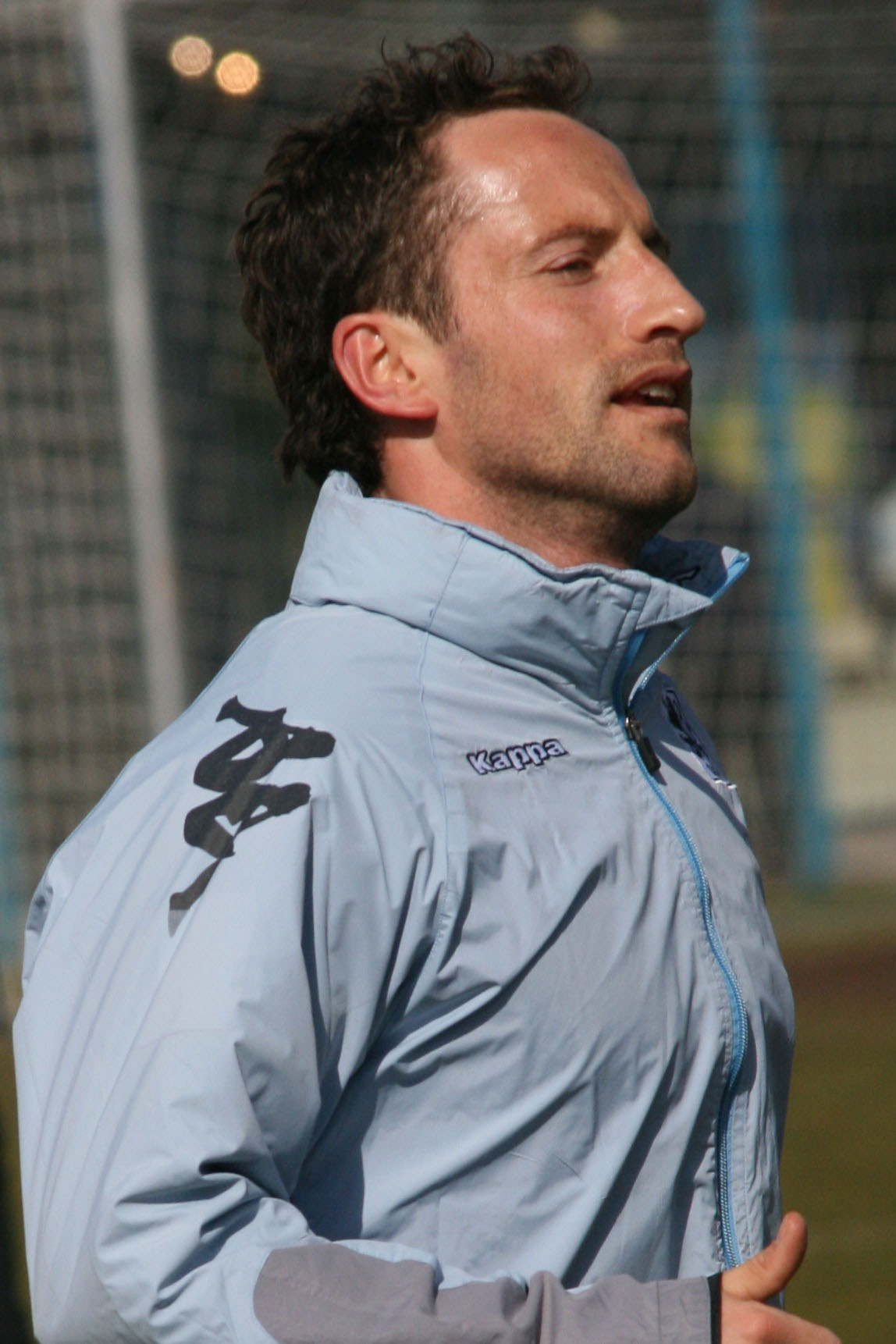

Personal information
- Full name: Roman Týce
- Date of birth: 7 May 1977 (age 49)
- Place of birth: Roudnice nad Labem, Czechoslovakia
- Height: 1.77 m (5 ft 10 in)
- Positions: Defender; midfielder

Youth career
- 1990–1995: Sparta Prague

Senior career*
Years	Team	Apps	(Gls)
1995–1996	Sparta Prague	17	(0)
1996–1998	Slovan Liberec	48	(4)
1998–2007	1860 Munich	137	(7)
2007–2011	SpVgg Unterhaching	82	(6)
Total		284	(17)

International career
1996–2000	Czech Republic U21	26	(0)
1999–2005	Czech Republic	25	(1)
Medal record
Men's football
Representing Czech Republic
UEFA European Championship
Bronze medal – third place	2004 Portugal
- * Club domestic league appearances and goals

Roman Týce (born 7 May 1977) is a Czech former professional football player. He played club football in the Czech Republic and Germany, as a defender and defensive midfielder. Týce played internationally for the Czech Republic at Euro 2004.

== Club career ==
Týce made his debut for Sparta Prague at the age of 17. He later played for FC Slovan Liberec before heading to Germany.

In Germany he signed for TSV 1860 Munich, becoming club captain. Týce suffered a knee injury in 2002, leaving the Bundesliga game against VfL Wolfsburg after having scored a goal. He was later diagnosed with torn ligaments in his right knee. He suffered a similar injury in 2006 with his left knee.

Týce left 1860 Munich in 2007, joining compatriot and former teammate Michal Kolomazník at SpVgg Unterhaching.

== International career ==
Týce captained his nation in the 2000 UEFA European Under-21 Championship, a tournament at which the Czech Republic reached the final before finishing second behind Italy.

Týce was involved in the Czech Republic's participation in the 2000 Summer Olympics tournament as captain. Before the tournament he stated his desire for his country to win a medal in the competition. The team was unsuccessful however, being eliminated at the group stage without winning a match.

He took part in Euro 2004, playing the whole of the group stage match against Germany. It was, however, the only match he participated in during the tournament.

== Style of play ==
He could play as a defender or defensive midfielder. His versatility allowed him to play at left back, right back, or in various positions in the midfield.

== Personal life ==
The son of Marcel and Alena Týce, Roman lived in the village of Černiv and went to primary school in the town of Libochovice until moving to Prague to become involved with Sparta Prague at the age of 13.

== Career statistics ==
=== International ===
Czech Republic national team
Year	Apps	Goals
1999	1	0
2000	3	0
2001	8	1
2003	4	0
2004	8	0
2005	1	0
Total	25	1
