= Aleksandrs Isakovs =

Latvian footballer

Personal information
- Date of birth: 16 September 1973 (age 53)
- Place of birth: Daugavpils, Latvian SSR, USSR (now Republic of Latvia)
- Height: 1.81 m (5 ft 11 in)
- Position: Defender

Senior career*
Years	Team	Apps	(Gls)
1992	FK Celtnieks	18	(2)
1993–1994	FK Auseklis	37	(0)
1995	Vilan-D	26	(2)
1996–1999	Dinaburg FC	88	(1)
1999	Lokomotiv Nizhniy-Novgorod	10	(0)
2000	Alania Vladikavkaz	2	(0)
2000	Volgar GazProm Astrakhan	18	(0)
2000	Dinaburg FC	2	(0)
2001	Volgar GazProm Astrakhan	29	(0)
2002–2007	Skonto FC	134	(1)
2007	Daugava Daugavpils	22	(0)

International career
1997–2005	Latvia	58	(0)
- * Club domestic league appearances and goals

Aleksandrs Isakovs (born 16 September 1973) is a Latvian former professional footballer who played as a defender. He made 58 appearances for the Latvia national team. He debuted in 1997, and played at the Euro 2004. He started his career in Dinaburg FC, and played for Lokomotiv Nizhniy Novgorod, before joining Latvian champion team Skonto FC. He ended his career in FK Daugava Daugavpils.

After the end of his career, Isakovs became the sporting director of his former club Daugava Daugavpils. On 22 October 2012, he was appointed head of Daugavpils Sport administration. Isakovs' specialty is also a sports teacher.

After retiring from professional football Isakovs began playing futsal. He participated at the Daugavpils futsal championship, winning the gold medals in the 2009–10 season.
