= Valentīns Lobaņovs =

Latvian footballer

Personal information
- Date of birth: 23 October 1971 (age 55)
- Place of birth: Riga, USSR
- Height: 1.90 m (6 ft 3 in)
- Position: Midfielder

Youth career
- RFSh Riga

Senior career*
Years	Team	Apps	(Gls)
1988	FC Latviya-Molodyozhnaya Riga		
1989	Zvejnieks Liepāja	2	(0)
1992–1996	Skonto FC	86	(8)
1997	FC Metallurg Lipetsk	34	(2)
1998	Skonto FC	22	(1)
1999	FC Shinnik Yaroslavl	23	(2)
2000–2001	Skonto FC	44	(0)
2002	FC Metallurg Krasnoyarsk	30	(0)
2003–2005	FC Metalurh Zaporizhzhia	23	(1)
2005	FK Venta	15	(0)
2005–2007	FK Jūrmala	20	(0)

International career
1994–2005	Latvia	58	(1)
- * Club domestic league appearances and goals

Valentīns Lobaņovs (Russian: Валентин Анатольевич Лобанёв; born 23 October 1971 in Riga) is a former football midfielder from Latvia. He has played 58 international matches and scored 1 goal for the Latvia national team. He debuted in 1994, and played at the Euro 2004. He started his career in Skonto FC and later played for Metallurg Lipetsk, Metallurg Krasnoyarsk, Shinnik Yaroslavl, Metalurh Zaporizhzhia, FK Venta. His last club was FK Jūrmala.

== Honours ==
Skonto

- Latvian Higher League champion: 1992, 1993, 1994, 1995, 1996, 2000, 2001, 2003
- Latvian Football Cup winner: 1992, 1995, 1998, 2000, 2001
