= 2001–02 AS Saint-Étienne season =

Season of a football league in France

AS Saint-Étienne
2001–02 season
- President: Alain Bompard
- Head coach: Alain Michel
- Stadium: Stade Geoffroy-Guichard
- French Division 2: 13th
- Coupe de France: Round of 64
- Coupe de la Ligue: Round of 32
- Top goalscorer: League: Alex Di Rocco (8); All: Alex Di Rocco (9)
- Highest home attendance: 15,873

The 2001–02 season was the 83rd season in the existence of AS Saint-Étienne and the club's third consecutive season in the second division of French football. In addition to the domestic league, AS Saint-Étienne competed in this season's edition of the Coupe de France and Coupe de la Ligue. The season covered the period from 1 July 2001 to 30 June 2002.

== Players ==
=== First-team squad ===
Note: Flags indicate national team as defined under FIFA eligibility rules; some limited exceptions apply. Players may hold more than one non-FIFA nationality.

| No. | Pos. | Nation | Player |
|---|---|---|---|
| 1 | GK | FRA | Dominique Casagrande |
| 16 | GK | FRA | Jérémie Janot |
| 2 | DF | DEN | Allan Olesen |
| 3 | DF | FRA | Patrice Carteron |
| 4 | DF | FRA | Mickaël Pontal |
| 5 | DF | ITA | Giovanni Bia |
| 12 | DF | FRA | Jean-Pascal Yao |
| 15 | DF | FRA | Sylvain Meslien |
| 22 | DF | MLI | Fousseni Diawara |
| 23 | DF | FRA | Patrick Guillou |
| 25 | DF | CMR | Lucien Mettomo |
| 26 | DF | FRA | Stéphane Hernandez |
| 28 | DF | BRA | Eduardo Oliveira |
| 30 | DF | FRA | Anthony Bartholomé |
| 31 | DF | FRA | Simon Carmignani |
| 32 | DF | ARG | Emiliano Tazzai |
| 6 | MF | FRA | Laurent Huard |

| No. | Pos. | Nation | Player |
|---|---|---|---|
| 7 | MF | SUI | Antonio Esposito |
| 8 | MF | FRA | David Hellebuyck |
| 10 | MF | FRA | Karim Fellahi |
| 13 | MF | SEN | Frédéric Mendy |
| 14 | MF | FRA | Damien Deom |
| 18 | MF | SEN | Alassane N'Dour |
| 20 | MF | FRA | Jérôme Tagherset |
| 24 | MF | FRA | Ted Kelton Agasson |
| 27 | MF | FRA | Julien Sablé |
| 29 | MF | FRA | Olivier Baudry |
| 7 | FW | BRA | Alex Dias |
| 9 | FW | RUS | Aleksandr Panov |
| 11 | FW | BRA | Rodrigão Alflen |
| 17 | FW | POL | Marcin Kuźba |
| 19 | FW | FRA | Cyrille Pouget |
| 21 | FW | FRA | Alex Di Rocco |
| 33 | FW | GUI | Pathé Bangoura |

== Pre-season and friendlies ==
Win Draw Loss Fixtures

| 30 June 2001 Friendly | Saint-Étienne | 1–1 | Montpellier | France |
| | | Report |

| 4 July 2001 Friendly | Nîmes | 2–1 | Saint-Étienne | Chambéry, France |
| | Charpenet 23' (pen.), 38' (pen.) | Report | Panov 47' | Stadium: Stade municipal Jacques Level |

| 7 July 2001 Friendly | Lens | 3–0 | Saint-Étienne | Clermont-Ferrand, France |
| 18:00 CEST (UTC+2) | | Report |

| 9 July 2001 Friendly | Saint-Étienne | 0–1 | Bohemians 1905 | Rive-de-Gier, France |
| | | Report | Hartig 16' | Stadium: Stade Bernard Mayol |

| 10 July 2001 Friendly | Saint-Étienne | 0–1 | Standard Liège | France |
| | | Report |

| 14 July 2001 Friendly | Saint-Étienne | 0–1 | Zamalek | France |
| | | Report |

| 15 July 2001 Friendly | Sportul Studențesc | 4–1 | Saint-Étienne | France |
| | | Report |

| 16 July 2001 Friendly | Dinamo București | 3–0 | Saint-Étienne | France |
| | | Report |

| 18 July 2001 Friendly | Saint-Étienne | 2–1 | Kahrabaa Ismailia | France |
| | | Report |

| 21 July 2001 Friendly | Saint-Étienne | 1–2 | Dinamo Zagreb | France |
| | | Report |

| 4 September 2001 Friendly | Saint-Étienne | 1–1 | CS Sfaxien | France |
| | | Report |

| 6 January 2002 Friendly | Saint-Étienne | 0–1 | Sedan | France |
| | | Report |

| 12 January 2002 Friendly | Saint-Étienne | 4–1 | Troyes | France |
| | | Report |

| 19 April 2002 Friendly | Saint-Étienne | 1–0 | Montpellier | France |
| | | Report |

== Competitions ==
=== Overall record ===
| Competition | First match | Last match | Starting round | Final position | Record | | | | | | | |
| Competition | First match | Last match | Starting round | Final position | Pld | W | D | L | GF | GA | GD | Win % |
|---|---|---|---|---|---|---|---|---|---|---|---|---|
| Division 2 | 28 July 2001 | 3 May 2002 | Matchday 1 | 13th | 38 | 11 | 13 | 14 | 35 | 42 | −7 | 28.95 |
| Coupe de France | 3 November 2001 | 15 December 2001 | Seventh round | Round of 64 | 3 | 2 | 0 | 1 | 4 | 1 | +3 | 66.67 |
| Coupe de la Ligue | 1 September 2001 | 1 December 2001 | First round | Round of 32 | 2 | 1 | 0 | 1 | 2 | 4 | −2 | 50.00 |
| Total | | | | | 43 | 14 | 13 | 16 | 41 | 47 | −6 | 32.56 |

Source: Competitions

=== French Division 2 ===
==== League table ====
| Pos | Team | Pld | W | D | L | GF | GA | GD | Pts |
|---|---|---|---|---|---|---|---|---|---|
| 11 | Niort | 38 | 11 | 15 | 12 | 40 | 39 | +1 | 48 |
| 12 | Amiens | 38 | 11 | 14 | 13 | 46 | 50 | −4 | 47 |
| 13 | Saint-Étienne | 38 | 11 | 13 | 14 | 35 | 42 | −7 | 46 |
| 14 | Gueugnon | 38 | 9 | 17 | 12 | 42 | 49 | −7 | 44 |
| 15 | Wasquehal | 38 | 11 | 10 | 17 | 43 | 55 | −12 | 43 |

Source: Ligue 2

==== Results summary ====
| Overall | | | | | | | | Home | | | | | | Away | | | | | |
| Pld | W | D | L | GF | GA | GD | Pts | W | D | L | GF | GA | GD | W | D | L | GF | GA | GD |
|---|---|---|---|---|---|---|---|---|---|---|---|---|---|---|---|---|---|---|---|
| 38 | 11 | 13 | 14 | 35 | 42 | −7 | 46 | 8 | 5 | 6 | 19 | 18 | +1 | 3 | 8 | 8 | 16 | 24 | −8 |

Source: Ligue 2

==== Results by round ====
| Round | 1 | 2 | 3 | 4 | 5 | 6 | 7 | 8 | 9 | 10 | 11 | 12 | 13 | 14 | 15 | 16 | 17 | 18 | 19 | 20 | 21 | 22 | 23 | 24 | 25 | 26 | 27 | 28 | 29 | 30 | 31 | 32 | 33 | 34 | 35 | 36 | 37 | 38 |
|---|---|---|---|---|---|---|---|---|---|---|---|---|---|---|---|---|---|---|---|---|---|---|---|---|---|---|---|---|---|---|---|---|---|---|---|---|---|---|
| Ground | H | A | H | A | A | H | A | H | A | H | A | H | A | H | A | H | A | H | A | H | A | H | H | A | H | A | H | A | H | A | H | A | H | A | H | A | H | A |
| Result | L | D | D | L | D | W | L | D | D | D | L | L | D | W | W | W | W | L | L | W | L | D | L | L | W | D | D | L | L | D | W | D | W | D | L | W | W | L |
| Position | 16 | 16 | 16 | 17 | 15 | 13 | 15 | 17 | 16 | 15 | 18 | 19 | 20 | 16 | 13 | 12 | 12 | 13 | 14 | 14 | 14 | 14 | 16 | 16 | 15 | 15 | 15 | 15 | 15 | 16 | 16 | 16 | 14 | 15 | 15 | 13 | 12 | 13 |

Source: Ligue 2
A = Away; H = Home; W = Win; D = Draw; L = Loss

==== Matches ====
| 28 July 2001 1 | Saint-Étienne | 1–2 | Istres | Saint-Étienne |
| 20:00 CEST (UTC+2) | Bia 75' (pen.) | Report | Akrour 20'; Tabet 55' | Stadium: Stade Geoffroy-Guichard; Attendance: 20,442; Referee: Jean-Marc Rodolphe |

| 5 August 2001 2 | Créteil | 1–1 | Saint-Étienne | Créteil |
| 20:45 CEST (UTC+2) | Bouger 2' | Report | N'Dour 75' | Stadium: Stade Dominique Duvauchelle; Attendance: 6,325; Referee: Damien Ledentu |

| 11 August 2001 3 | Saint-Étienne | 2–2 | Le Mans | Saint-Étienne |
| --:-- CEST (UTC+2) | | | | Stadium: Stade Geoffroy-Guichard |

| 17 August 2001 4 | Grenoble | 1–0 | Saint-Étienne | Grenoble |
| --:-- CEST (UTC+2) | Weber (yellow card) 33'; Ravaux (yellow card) 63'; Dogbé 71' | Report | Rodrigão (yellow card) 53'; Bia (yellow card) 88' | Stadium: Stade Lesdiguières; Attendance: 10,551; Referee: Claude Colombo |

| 25 August 2001 5 | Wasquehal | 1–1 | Saint-Étienne | Wasquehal |
| --:-- CEST (UTC+2) | Malm 23'; Benon (yellow card) 68' | Report | Di Rocco 36'; Baudry (yellow card) 69'; Huard (yellow card) 85' | Stadium: Complexe Lucien Montagne; Attendance: 3,413; Referee: Gilles Veissière |

| 28 August 2001 6 | Saint-Étienne | 1–0 | Ajaccio | Saint-Étienne |
| --:-- CEST (UTC+2) | | | | Stadium: Stade Geoffroy-Guichard |

| 15 September 2001 8 | Saint-Étienne | 1–1 | Gueugnon | Saint-Étienne |
| --:-- CEST (UTC+2) | | | | Stadium: Stade Geoffroy-Guichard |

| 30 September 2001 10 | Saint-Étienne | 1–1 | Strasbourg | Saint-Étienne |
| --:-- CEST (UTC+2) | | | | Stadium: Stade Geoffroy-Guichard |

| 13 October 2001 12 | Saint-Étienne | 0–1 | Le Havre | Saint-Étienne |
| --:-- CEST (UTC+2) | | | | Stadium: Stade Geoffroy-Guichard |

| 27 October 2001 14 | Saint-Étienne | 1–0 | Martigues | Saint-Étienne |
| --:-- CEST (UTC+2) | | | | Stadium: Stade Geoffroy-Guichard |

| 13 November 2001 16 | Saint-Étienne | 1–0 | Nîmes | Saint-Étienne |
| --:-- CEST (UTC+2) | | | | Stadium: Stade Geoffroy-Guichard |

| 28 November 2001 18 | Saint-Étienne | 1–3 | Nancy | Saint-Étienne |
| --:-- CEST (UTC+2) | | | | Stadium: Stade Geoffroy-Guichard |

=== Coupe de France ===
| 3 November 2001 Seventh round | Cluses-Scionzier | 0–1 | Saint-Étienne | Scionzier |
| | | | Hellebuyck 86' | Stadium: Stade intercommunal Cluses-Scionzier; Attendance: 2,700; Referee: Philippe Malige |

| 24 November 2001 Eighth round | Gap | 0–3 | Saint-Étienne | Gap |
| | | | Pouget 29'; Di Rocco 39'; N'Dour 42' | Stadium: Stade Municipal de Gap; Attendance: 5,000; Referee: Olivier Prengiel |

| 15 December 2001 Round of 64 | Louhans-Cuiseaux | 1–0 (a.e.t.) | Saint-Étienne | Louhans |
| 19:00 CET (UTC+1) | Chapuis 119' | Report | | Stadium: Stade du Bram; Attendance: 4,000; Referee: Claude Medam |

=== Coupe de la Ligue ===
| 1 September 2001 First round | Saint-Étienne | 2–0 | Gueugnon | Saint-Étienne |
| 17:00 CEST (UTC+2) | Huard 9'; Fellahi (yellow card) 35'; Di Rocco 85'; Hernandez (yellow card) 87' | Report | Bouzin (yellow card) 53'; Grande (yellow card) 65'; Collin (yellow card) 80'; Flauto (yellow card) 90'; Traoré (yellow card) 90' | Stadium: Stade Geoffroy-Guichard; Attendance: 12,538; Referee: Thierry Auriac |

| 1 December 2001 Second round | Guingamp | 4–0 | Saint-Étienne | Guingamp |
| 17:00 CEST (UTC+1) | Bardon 25'; Guyot 55'; Saci 74'; Malouda 82' | Report | | Stadium: Stade de Roudourou; Attendance: 7,637; Referee: Patrick Lhermite |
