= Jérémie Janot =

French footballer (born 1977)

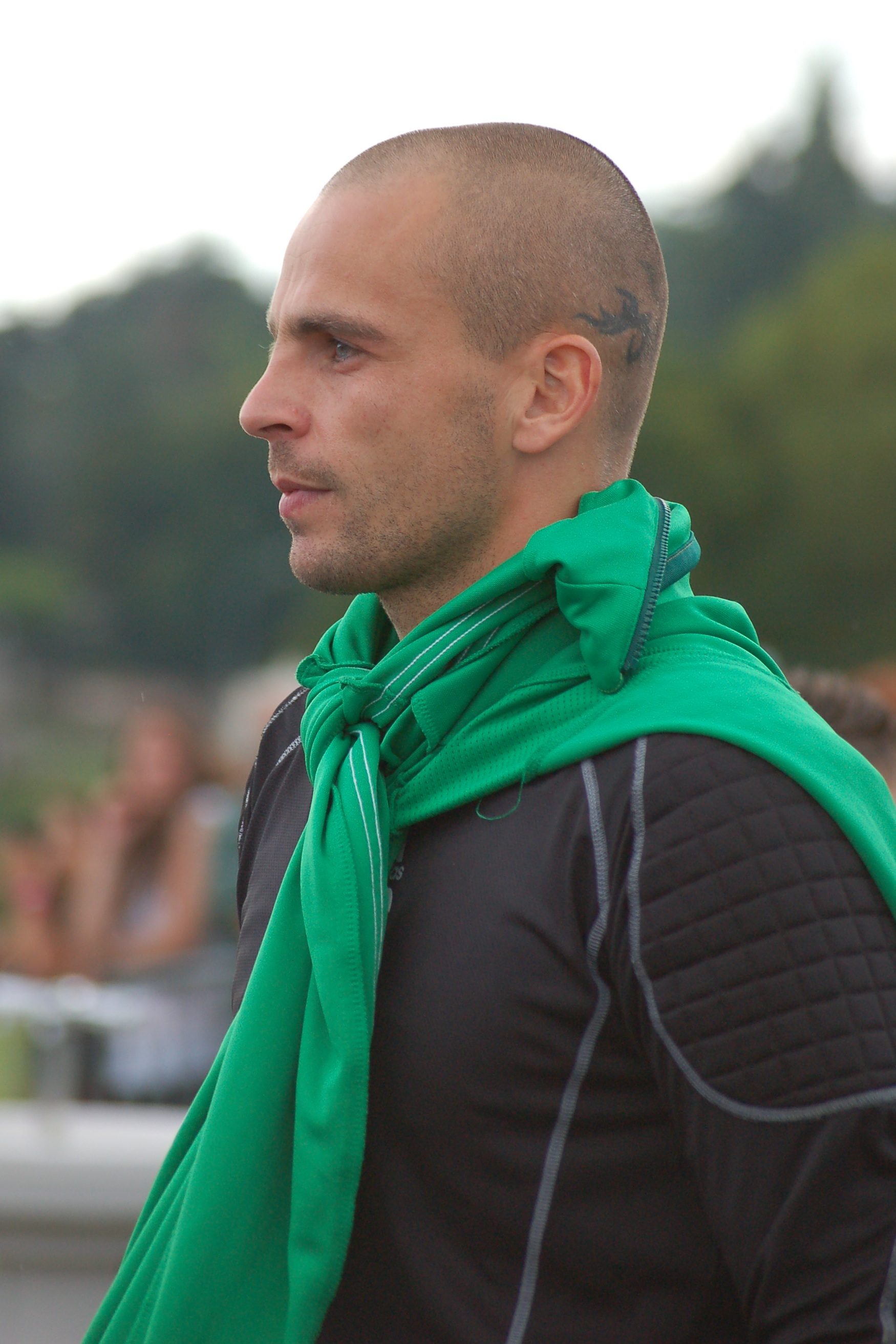
- Janot in August 2011

Personal information
- Full name: Jérémie Roger Janot
- Date of birth: 11 October 1977 (age 49)
- Place of birth: Valenciennes, Nord, France
- Height: 1.73 m (5 ft 8 in)
- Position: Goalkeeper

Team information
- Current team: France U21 (goalkeeper coach)

Youth career
- Saint-Étienne

Senior career*
Years	Team	Apps	(Gls)
1996–2012	Saint-Étienne	342	(0)
2012	→ Lorient (loan)	3	(0)
2012–2013	Le Mans	29	(0)
Total		374	(0)

Managerial career
- 2014–2015: US Villars (U19)
- 2015–2016: FCO Firminy
- * Club domestic league appearances and goals

Jérémie Roger Janot (French pronunciation: [ʒeʁemi ʒano]; born 11 October 1977) is a French former professional footballer who played as a goalkeeper. He played for Saint-Étienne for 16 years of his career, and last played for Le Mans.

He set a record of 1,534 minutes without letting in a goal at the Stade Geoffroy-Guichard and was voted "goalkeeper of the year" by L'Équipe after the 2006–07 season.

== Playing career ==
Janot signed a three-year contract with Le Mans on 2 August 2012.

== Coaching career ==
In summer 2014, Janot was appointed manager of US Villars' U19 squad. In the following season, he became manager of FCO Firminy.

In December 2015, he became the head coach of the PHR team of Firminy.

On 11 July 2016, Janot revealed on Twitter, that he had returned to Saint-Étienne as a goalkeeper coach for the youth teams of the club. In the following season, he joined AJ Auxerre, still as a goalkeeper coach.

In June 2019, he joined Valenciennes FC as a goalkeeper coach.

== Career statistics ==
Appearances and goals by club, season and competition
Club	Season	League			National cup		League cup		Europe		Total	
Club	Season	Division	Apps	Goals	Apps	Goals	Apps	Goals	Apps	Goals	Apps	Goals
Saint-Étienne	1996–97	Division 2	14	0	0	0	0	0	—		14	0
Saint-Étienne	1997–98	Division 2	1	0	0	0	0	0	—		1	0
Saint-Étienne	1998–99	Division 2	9	0	0	0	1	0	—		10	0
Saint-Étienne	1999–2000	Division 1	5	0	1	0	0	0	—		6	0
Saint-Étienne	2000–01	Division 1	14	0	1	0	3	0	—		18	0
Saint-Étienne	2001–02	Division 2	1	0	2	0	1	0	—		4	0
Saint-Étienne	2002–03	Ligue 2	28	0	1	0	4	0	—		33	0
Saint-Étienne	2003–04	Ligue 2	37	0	0	0	4	0	—		41	0
Saint-Étienne	2004–05	Ligue 1	38	0	0	0	4	0	—		42	0
Saint-Étienne	2005–06	Ligue 1	37	0	1	0	1	0	4	0	43	0
Saint-Étienne	2006–07	Ligue 1	36	0	1	0	0	0	—		37	0
Saint-Étienne	2007–08	Ligue 1	22	0	1	0	0	0	—		23	0
Saint-Étienne	2008–09	Ligue 1	26	0	2	0	1	0	6	0	35	0
Saint-Étienne	2009–10	Ligue 1	38	0	1	0	0	0	—		39	0
Saint-Étienne	2010–11	Ligue 1	36	0	1	0	3	0	—		40	0
Saint-Étienne	2011–12	Ligue 1	0	0	0	0	0	0	—		0	0
Saint-Étienne	Total		342	0	12	0	22	0	10	0	386	0
Lorient (loan)	2011–12	Ligue 1	3	0	—		—		—		3	0
Le Mans	2012–13	Ligue 2	29	0	1	0	1	0	—		31	0
Career total			374	0	13	0	23	0	10	0	420	0
