= UNFP Player of the Month =

Award for the best Ligue 1 player each month of the season

The UNFP Player of the Month trophy is an award that recognises the best Ligue 1 player each month of the season. The winner is chosen by a combination of an online public vote, which contributes to 50% of the final tally, and the players of each Ligue 1 and Ligue 2 clubs.

A similar award goes to the best player in Ligue 2.

== Ligue 1 ==
=== Winners ===
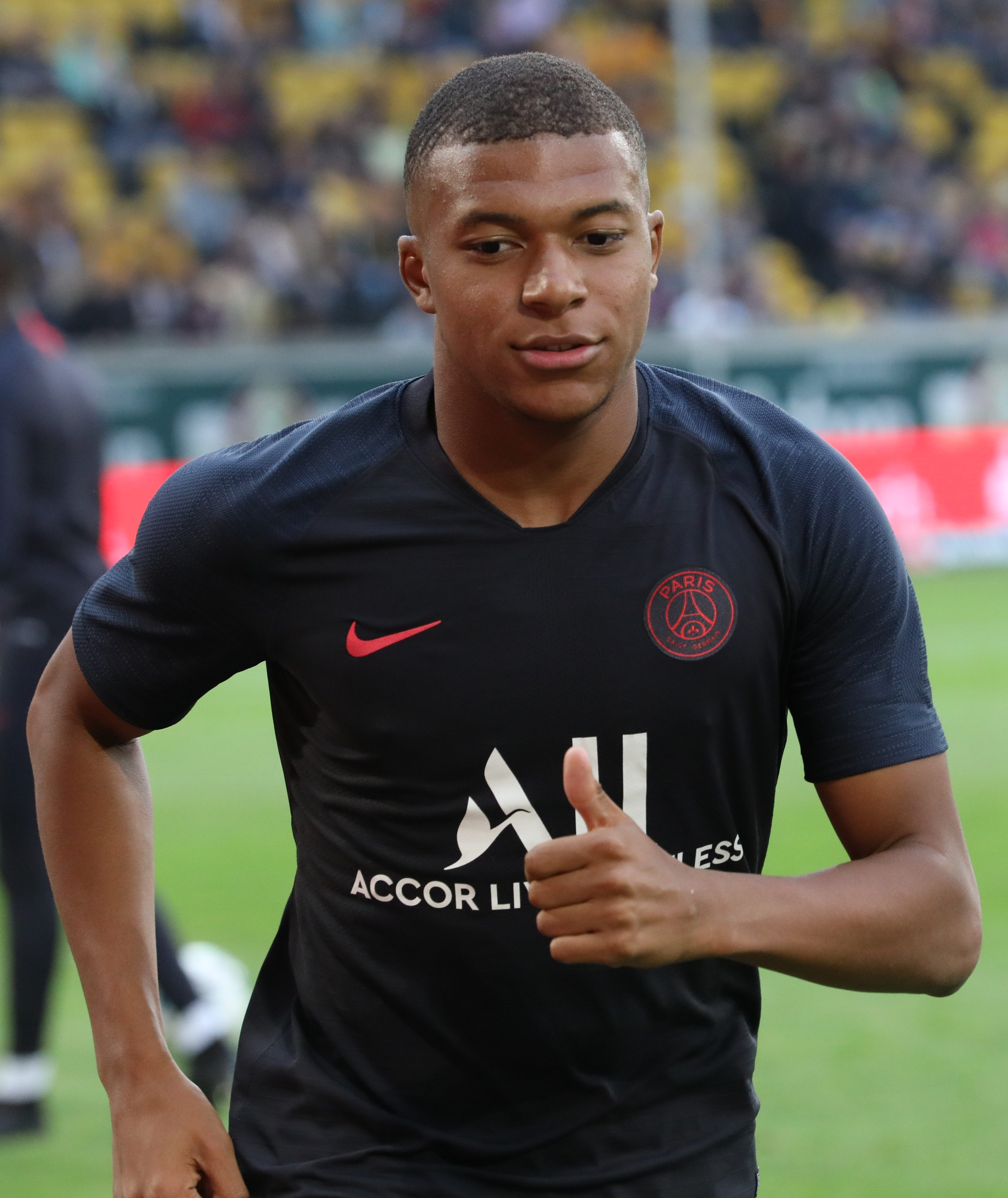
Kylian Mbappé holds the record for most individual Player of the Month awards, with eleven.

As of September 2026 award

Key
GK	Goalkeeper
DF	Defender
MF	Midfielder
FW	Forward

Month	Year (Note: Each year is linked to an article on the particular season associated with the month of that year.)	Nationality	Player	Team	Position
August	2003	DR Congo	Shabani Nonda	Monaco	FW
September	2003	France	Ludovic Giuly	Monaco	FW
October	2003	Portugal	Pauleta	Paris Saint-Germain	FW
November	2003	France	Ludovic Giuly	Monaco	FW
December	2003	France	Djibril Cissé	Auxerre	FW
January	2004	Ivory Coast	Didier Drogba	Marseille	FW
February	2004	Serbia and Montenegro	Danijel Ljuboja	Paris Saint-Germain	FW
March	2004	Romania	Viorel Moldovan	Nantes	FW
April	2004	Argentina	Juan Pablo Sorín	Paris Saint-Germain	DF
May	2004	Ivory Coast	Didier Drogba	Marseille	FW
August	2004	France	Franck Ribéry	Metz	FW
September	2004	France	Fabien Barthez	Marseille	GK
October	2004	Ghana	Michael Essien	Lyon	MF
November	2004	France	Camel Meriem	Bordeaux	MF
December	2004	France	Frédéric Piquionne	Saint-Étienne	FW
January	2005	France	Péguy Luyindula	Marseille	FW
February	2005	Brazil	Juninho	Lyon	MF
March	2005	Brazil	Juninho	Lyon	MF
April	2005	Republic of the Congo	Matt Moussilou	Lille	FW
May	2005	Senegal	Mamadou Niang	Strasbourg	FW
August	2005	France	Jérôme Leroy	Lens	MF
September	2005	France	Grégory Coupet	Lyon	GK
October	2005	France	Franck Ribéry	Marseille	FW
November	2005	France	Franck Ribéry	Marseille	FW
December	2005	Senegal	Mamadou Niang	Marseille	FW
January	2006	Japan	Daisuke Matsui	Le Mans	MF
February	2006	Nigeria	John Utaka	Rennes	FW
March	2006	France	Yoann Gourcuff	Rennes	MF
April	2006	France	Franck Ribéry	Marseille	FW
August	2006	France	Steve Savidan	Valenciennes	FW
September	2006	France	Jérémie Janot	Saint-Étienne	GK
October	2006	Brazil	Juninho	Lyon	MF
November	2006	France	Florent Malouda	Lyon	MF
December	2006	France	Frédéric Piquionne	Saint-Étienne	FW
January	2007	France	Bafétimbi Gomis	Saint-Étienne	FW
February	2007	Sweden	Johan Elmander	Toulouse	FW
March	2007	France	Samir Nasri	Marseille	MF
April	2007	France	Péguy Luyindula	Paris Saint-Germain	FW
August	2007	France	David Bellion	Bordeaux	FW
September	2007	France	Jérôme Rothen	Paris Saint-Germain	MF
October	2007	France	Jérôme Leroy	Rennes	MF
November	2007	France	Sébastien Puygrenier	Nancy	DF
December	2007	Senegal	Mamadou Niang	Marseille	FW
January	2008	France	Karim Benzema	Lyon	FW
February	2008	France	Steve Mandanda	Marseille	GK
March	2008	Ivory Coast	Kader Keïta	Lyon	FW
April	2008	France	Karim Benzema	Lyon	FW
August	2008	France	Steve Mandanda	Marseille	GK
September	2008	France	André-Pierre Gignac	Toulouse	FW
October	2008	France	Guillaume Hoarau	Paris Saint-Germain	FW
November	2008	France	Olivier Echouafni	Nice	MF
December	2008	Benin	Stéphane Sessègnon	Paris Saint-Germain	MF
January	2009	France	Péguy Luyindula	Paris Saint-Germain	FW
February	2009	France	Guillaume Hoarau	Paris Saint-Germain	FW
March	2009	France	André-Pierre Gignac	Toulouse	FW
April	2009	France	Yoann Gourcuff	Bordeaux	MF
August	2009	Argentina	Lisandro López	Lyon	FW
September	2009	France	Hugo Lloris	Lyon	GK
October	2009	Poland	Ireneusz Jeleń	Auxerre	FW
November	2009	France	Fabrice Abriel	Marseille	MF
December	2009	France	Jérémie Janot	Saint-Étienne	GK
January	2010	Morocco	Karim Aït-Fana	Montpellier	FW
February	2010	France	Hatem Ben Arfa	Marseille	MF
March	2010	Belgium	Eden Hazard	Lille	MF
April	2010	Argentina	Lucho González	Marseille	MF
September	2010	France	Dimitri Payet	Saint-Étienne	MF
October	2010	France	Steeve Elana	Brest	GK
November	2010	France	Clément Chantôme	Paris Saint-Germain	MF
December	2010	Brazil	Nenê	Paris Saint-Germain	FW
January	2011	France	Marvin Martin	Sochaux	MF
February	2011	France	Mickaël Landreau	Lille	GK
March	2011	Belgium	Eden Hazard	Lille	MF
April	2011	France	Mamadou Sakho	Paris Saint-Germain	DF
September	2011	Argentina	Javier Pastore	Paris Saint-Germain	MF
October	2011	Brazil	Nenê	Paris Saint-Germain	FW
November	2011	Morocco	Younès Belhanda	Montpellier	MF
December	2011	Italy	Salvatore Sirigu	Paris Saint-Germain	GK
January	2012	Serbia	Milan Biševac	Paris Saint-Germain	DF
February	2012	Gabon	Pierre-Emerick Aubameyang	Saint-Étienne	FW
March	2012	Belgium	Eden Hazard	Lille	MF
April	2012	Belgium	Eden Hazard	Lille	MF
September	2012	Sweden	Zlatan Ibrahimović	Paris Saint-Germain	FW
October	2012	Gabon	Pierre-Emerick Aubameyang	Saint-Étienne	FW
November	2012	France	Stéphane Ruffier	Saint-Étienne	GK
December	2012	Argentina	Darío Cvitanich	Nice	FW
January	2013	Italy	Salvatore Sirigu	Paris Saint-Germain	GK
February	2013	Gabon	Pierre-Emerick Aubameyang	Saint-Étienne	FW
March	2013	Brazil	Thiago Silva	Paris Saint-Germain	DF
April	2013	Ivory Coast	Salomon Kalou	Lille	FW
September	2013	Italy	Marco Verratti	Paris Saint-Germain	MF
October	2013	Nigeria	Vincent Enyeama	Lille	GK
November	2013	Nigeria	Vincent Enyeama	Lille	GK
December	2013	Ivory Coast	Salomon Kalou	Lille	FW
January	2014	Sweden	Zlatan Ibrahimović	Paris Saint-Germain	FW
February	2014	Sweden	Zlatan Ibrahimović	Paris Saint-Germain	FW
March	2014	Sweden	Zlatan Ibrahimović	Paris Saint-Germain	FW
April	2014	Bulgaria	Dimitar Berbatov	Monaco	FW
September	2014	France	André-Pierre Gignac	Marseille	FW
October	2014	Brazil	Lucas Moura	Paris Saint-Germain	FW
November	2014	Argentina	Javier Pastore	Paris Saint-Germain	MF
December	2014	France	Alexandre Lacazette	Lyon	FW
January	2015	France	Alexandre Lacazette	Lyon	FW
February	2015	Argentina	Emiliano Sala	Caen	FW
March	2015	Argentina	Javier Pastore	Paris Saint-Germain	MF
April	2015	Argentina	Javier Pastore	Paris Saint-Germain	MF
September	2015	France	Lassana Diarra	Marseille	MF
October	2015	Belgium	Michy Batshuayi	Marseille	FW
November	2015	Sweden	Zlatan Ibrahimović	Paris Saint-Germain	FW
December	2015	Argentina	Ángel Di María	Paris Saint-Germain	MF
January	2016	France	Hatem Ben Arfa	Nice	MF
February	2016	Belgium	Guillaume Gillet	Nantes	MF
March	2016	France	Ousmane Dembélé	Rennes	FW
April	2016	Morocco	Sofiane Boufal	Lille	MF
August	2016	France	Alexandre Lacazette	Lyon	FW
September	2016	Uruguay	Edinson Cavani	Paris Saint-Germain	FW
October	2016	Uruguay	Edinson Cavani	Paris Saint-Germain	FW
November	2016	France	Thomas Lemar	Monaco	MF
December	2016	France	Maxime Lopez	Marseille	MF
January	2017	Portugal	Bernardo Silva	Monaco	MF
February	2017	Italy	Marco Verratti	Paris Saint-Germain	MF
March	2017	France	Florian Thauvin	Marseille	FW
April	2017	France	Kylian Mbappé	Monaco	FW
August	2017	Colombia	Radamel Falcao	Monaco	FW
September	2017	France	Steve Mandanda	Marseille	GK
October	2017	France	Nabil Fekir	Lyon	FW
November	2017	France	Florian Thauvin	Marseille	FW
December	2017	Brazil	Neymar	Paris Saint-Germain	FW
January	2018	France	Florian Thauvin	Marseille	FW
February	2018	France	Mathieu Debuchy	Saint-Étienne	DF
March	2018	France	Kylian Mbappé	Paris Saint-Germain	FW
April	2018	Netherlands	Memphis Depay	Lyon	FW
August	2018	France	Kylian Mbappé	Paris Saint-Germain	FW
September	2018	Ivory Coast	Nicolas Pépé	Lille	FW
October	2018	Argentina	Emiliano Sala	Nantes	FW
November	2018	Tunisia	Wahbi Khazri	Saint-Étienne	FW
December	2018	France	Kenny Lala	Strasbourg	DF
January	2019	Ivory Coast	Nicolas Pépé	Lille	FW
February	2019	France	Kylian Mbappé	Paris Saint-Germain	FW
March	2019	Italy	Mario Balotelli	Marseille	FW
April	2019	France	Jonathan Bamba	Lille	FW
August	2019	France	Eduardo Camavinga	Rennes	MF
September	2019	Nigeria	Victor Osimhen	Lille	FW
October	2019	Brazil	Thiago Silva	Paris Saint-Germain	DF
November	2019	France	Jeff Reine-Adélaïde	Lyon	MF
December	2019	France	Wissam Ben Yedder	Monaco	FW
January	2020	Brazil	Neymar	Paris Saint-Germain	FW
September	2020	Senegal	Ibrahima Niane	Metz	FW
October	2020	France	Jonathan Bamba	Lille	FW
November	2020	Algeria	Andy Delort	Montpellier	FW
December	2020	Turkey	Yusuf Yazıcı	Lille	MF
January	2021	Algeria	Farid Boulaya	Metz	MF
February	2021	France	Kylian Mbappé	Paris Saint-Germain	FW
March	2021	Costa Rica	Keylor Navas	Paris Saint-Germain	GK
April	2021	Turkey	Burak Yılmaz	Lille	FW
August	2021	France	Kylian Mbappé	Paris Saint-Germain	FW
September	2021	Ivory Coast	Seko Fofana	Lens	MF
October	2021	Brazil	Lucas Paquetá	Lyon	MF
November	2021	France	Gaëtan Laborde	Rennes	FW
December	2021	France	Téji Savanier	Montpellier	MF
January	2022	France	Wissam Ben Yedder	Monaco	FW
February	2022	France	Kylian Mbappé	Paris Saint-Germain	FW
March	2022	France	Martin Terrier	Rennes	FW
April	2022	France	Benjamin Bourigeaud	Rennes	MF
August	2022	Brazil	Neymar	Paris Saint-Germain	FW
September	2022	Argentina	Lionel Messi	Paris Saint-Germain	FW
October	2022	France	Martin Terrier	Rennes	FW
November/December	2022	France	Kylian Mbappé	Paris Saint-Germain	FW
January	2023	France	Wissam Ben Yedder	Monaco	FW
February	2023	France	Kylian Mbappé	Paris Saint-Germain	FW
March	2023	Belgium	Loïs Openda	Lens	FW
April	2023	Belgium	Loïs Openda	Lens	FW
August	2023	Japan	Takumi Minamino	Monaco	MF
September	2023	Poland	Marcin Bułka	Nice	GK
October	2023	France	Kylian Mbappé	Paris Saint-Germain	FW
November	2023	France	Kylian Mbappé	Paris Saint-Germain	FW
December	2023	Gabon	Pierre-Emerick Aubameyang	Marseille	FW
January	2024	France	Martin Terrier	Rennes	FW
February	2024	France	Pierre Lees-Melou	Brest	MF
March	2024	Kosovo	Edon Zhegrova	Lille	MF
April	2024	France	Alexandre Lacazette	Lyon	FW
September	2024	France	Bradley Barcola	Paris Saint-Germain	FW
October	2024	Georgia	Zuriko Davitashvili	Saint-Étienne	FW
November	2024	Canada	Jonathan David	Lille	FW
December	2024	England	Mason Greenwood	Marseille	FW
January	2025	France	Ousmane Dembélé	Paris Saint-Germain	FW
February	2025	Algeria	Amine Gouiri	Marseille	FW
March	2025	France	Désiré Doué	Paris Saint-Germain	FW
April	2025	England	Mason Greenwood	Marseille	FW
August	2025	Algeria	Ilan Kebbal	Paris FC	FW
September	2025	France	Florian Thauvin	Lens	FW
October	2025	England	Mason Greenwood	Marseille	FW
November	2025	France	Florian Thauvin	Lens	FW
December/January	2025/2026	Brazil	Endrick	Lyon	FW
February	2026	France	Ludovic Ajorque	Brest	FW
March	2026	France	Florian Thauvin	Lens	FW
April	2026	France	Esteban Lepaul	Rennes	FW
September	2026	Spain	Ferran Torres	Paris Saint-Germain	FW

=== Multiple winners ===
The below table lists those who have won on more than one occasion.

As of March 2026 award

	Indicates current Ligue 1 player
Italics	Indicates player still playing professional football

Rank	Player	Wins
1st	Kylian Mbappé	11
2nd	Florian Thauvin	6
3rd	Zlatan Ibrahimović	5
4th	Pierre-Emerick Aubameyang	4
4th	Eden Hazard	4
4th	Alexandre Lacazette	4
4th	Javier Pastore	4
4th	Franck Ribéry	4
9th	Wissam Ben Yedder	3
9th	André-Pierre Gignac	3
9th	Mason Greenwood	3
9th	Juninho	3
9th	Peguy Luyindula	3
9th	Steve Mandanda	3
9th	Neymar	3
9th	Mamadou Niang	3
9th	Martin Terrier	3
18th	Jonathan Bamba	2
18th	Hatem Ben Arfa	2
18th	Karim Benzema	2
18th	Edinson Cavani	2
18th	Ousmane Dembélé	2
18th	Didier Drogba	2
18th	Vincent Enyeama	2
18th	Ludovic Giuly	2
18th	Yoann Gourcuff	2
18th	Guillaume Hoarau	2
18th	Jérémie Janot	2
18th	Salomon Kalou	2
18th	Jérôme Leroy	2
18th	Nenê	2
18th	Loïs Openda	2
18th	Nicolas Pépé	2
18th	Frédéric Piquionne	2
18th	Emiliano Sala	2
18th	Thiago Silva	2
18th	Salvatore Sirigu	2
18th	Marco Verratti	2

=== Awards won by nationality ===
As of September 2026 award

Country	Wins
France	97
Brazil	13
Argentina	12
Belgium	8
Ivory Coast	8
Sweden	6
Italy	5
Algeria	4
Gabon	4
Nigeria	4
Senegal	4
England	3
Morocco	3
Japan	2
Poland	2
Portugal	2
Serbia (Note: Danijel Ljuboja played for Serbia and Montenegro when he was rewarded in 2004, which was renamed as Serbia in 2006.)	2
Turkey	2
Uruguay	2
Benin	1
Bulgaria	1
Canada	1
Colombia	1
Congo	1
Costa Rica	1
DR Congo	1
Georgia	1
Ghana	1
Kosovo	1
Netherlands	1
Romania	1
Spain	1
Tunisia	1

=== Awards won by club ===
As of September 2026 award

Club	Wins
Paris Saint-Germain	52
Marseille	29
Lyon	20
Lille	19
Saint-Étienne	15
Monaco	12
Rennes	11
Lens	7
Montpellier	4
Nice	4
Bordeaux	3
Brest	3
Metz	3
Nantes	3
Toulouse	3
Auxerre	2
Strasbourg	2
Caen	1
Le Mans	1
Nancy	1
Paris FC	1
Sochaux	1
Valenciennes	1
