= 2003–04 AS Saint-Étienne season =

AS Saint-Étienne
2003–04 season
- Head coach: Frédéric Antonetti
- Stadium: Stade Geoffroy-Guichard
- Ligue 2: 1st (promoted)
- Coupe de France: Round of 64
- Coupe de la Ligue: Semi-finals
- Top goalscorer: League: Lilian Compan (11); All: Lilian Compan (16)
- Average home league attendance: 21,898

The 2003–04 season was the 85th season in the existence of AS Saint-Étienne and the club's third consecutive season in the second division of French football. In addition to the domestic league, AS Saint-Étienne participated in this season's editions of the Coupe de France and the Coupe de la Ligue.

== Competitions ==
=== Overall record ===
Competition	First match	Last match	Starting round	Final position	Record							
Competition	First match	Last match	Starting round	Final position	Pld	W	D	L	GF	GA	GD	Win %
Ligue 2	2 August 2003	22 May 2004	Matchday 1	Winners	38	22	7	9	44	29	+15	57.89
Coupe de France	22 November 2003	3 January 2004	Seventh round	Round of 64	3	2	1	0	5	1	+4	66.67
Coupe de la Ligue	24 September 2004	4 February 2004	First round	Semi-finals	5	4	0	1	9	5	+4	80.00
Total					46	28	8	10	58	35	+23	60.87

Source: Competitions

=== Ligue 2 ===
==== League table ====
Pos	Team	Pld	W	D	L	GF	GA	GD	Pts	Promotion or Relegation
1	Saint-Étienne (C, P)	38	22	7	9	44	29	+15	73	Promotion to Ligue 1
2	Caen (P)	38	20	11	7	56	31	+25	71	Promotion to Ligue 1
3	Istres (P)	38	19	9	10	44	26	+18	66	Promotion to Ligue 1
4	Lorient	38	17	10	11	57	45	+12	61	
5	Sedan	38	15	15	8	42	31	+11	60	

Source: Ligue 2
(C) Champions; (P) Promoted

==== Results summary ====
Overall								Home						Away					
Pld	W	D	L	GF	GA	GD	Pts	W	D	L	GF	GA	GD	W	D	L	GF	GA	GD
38	22	7	9	44	29	+15	73	11	5	3	23	14	+9	11	2	6	21	15	+6

Source: Ligue 2

==== Results by round ====
Round	1	2	3	4	5	6	7	8	9	10	11	12	13	14	15	16	17	18	19	20	21	22	23	24	25	26	27	28	29	30	31	32	33	34	35	36	37	38
Ground	A	A	H	A	H	A	H	A	H	A	H	A	H	A	H	A	H	A	H	H	A	H	A	H	A	H	A	H	A	H	A	H	A	H	A	H	A	H
Result	L	W	W	L	L	W	W	W	L	L	W	W	W	L	D	D	W	W	W	D	L	W	W	L	W	W	W	W	W	D	D	W	W	D	W	D	L	W
Position	19	9	5	8	11	7	3	3	5	8	5	4	3	4	5	6	6	3	2	3	5	3	2	3	3	2	2	1	1	1	1	1	1	1	1	1	1	1

Source: Ligue 2
A = Away; H = Home; W = Win; D = Draw; L = Loss

==== Matches ====
2 August 2003 1	Châteauroux	2–0	Saint-Étienne	Châteauroux
--:-- CEST (UTC+2)

9 August 2003 2	Nancy	0–1	Saint-Étienne	Tomblaine
--:-- CEST (UTC+2)

15 August 2003 3	Saint-Étienne	2–1	Lorient	Saint-Étienne
--:-- CEST (UTC+2)				Stadium: Stade Geoffroy-Guichard

19 August 2003 4	Créteil	1–0	Saint-Étienne	Créteil
--:-- CEST (UTC+2)

23 August 2003 5	Saint-Étienne	2–3	Troyes	Saint-Étienne
--:-- CEST (UTC+2)				Stadium: Stade Geoffroy-Guichard

31 August 2003 6	Sedan	1–2	Saint-Étienne	Sedan
--:-- CEST (UTC+2)

5 September 2003 7	Saint-Étienne	1–0	Valence	Saint-Étienne
--:-- CEST (UTC+2)				Stadium: Stade Geoffroy-Guichard

13 September 2003 8	Besançon	0–1	Saint-Étienne	Besançon
--:-- CEST (UTC+2)

21 September 2003 9	Saint-Étienne	0–2	Amiens	Saint-Étienne
--:-- CEST (UTC+2)				Stadium: Stade Geoffroy-Guichard

27 September 2003 10	Caen	1–0	Saint-Étienne	Caen
--:-- CEST (UTC+2)

3 October 2003 11	Saint-Étienne	2–0	Rouen	Saint-Étienne
--:-- CEST (UTC+2)				Stadium: Stade Geoffroy-Guichard

19 October 2003 12	Clermont	0–3	Saint-Étienne
--:-- CEST (UTC+2)

25 October 2003 13	Saint-Étienne	1–0	Grenoble	Saint-Étienne
--:-- CEST (UTC+2)				Stadium: Stade Geoffroy-Guichard

1 November 2003 14	Laval	2–0	Saint-Étienne
--:-- CET (UTC+1)

7 November 2003 15	Saint-Étienne	0–0	Istres	Saint-Étienne
--:-- CET (UTC+1)				Stadium: Stade Geoffroy-Guichard

29 November 2003 16	Angers	1–1	Saint-Étienne
--:-- CET (UTC+1)

10 December 2003 17	Saint-Étienne	2–1	Niort	Saint-Étienne
--:-- CET (UTC+1)				Stadium: Stade Geoffroy-Guichard

6 December 2003 18	Gueugnon	0–1	Saint-Étienne
--:-- CET (UTC+1)

21 December 2003 19	Saint-Étienne	2–0	Le Havre	Saint-Étienne
--:-- CET (UTC+1)				Stadium: Stade Geoffroy-Guichard

10 January 2004 20	Saint-Étienne	0–0	Nancy	Saint-Étienne
--:-- CET (UTC+1)				Stadium: Stade Geoffroy-Guichard

18 January 2004 21	Lorient	2–0	Saint-Étienne
--:-- CET (UTC+1)

31 January 2004 20	Saint-Étienne	3–2	Créteil	Saint-Étienne
--:-- CET (UTC+1)				Stadium: Stade Geoffroy-Guichard

8 February 2004 23	Troyes	0–1	Saint-Étienne
--:-- CET (UTC+1)

14 February 2004 24	Saint-Étienne	0–2	Sedan	Saint-Étienne
--:-- CET (UTC+1)				Stadium: Stade Geoffroy-Guichard

21 February 2004 25	Valence	1–3	Saint-Étienne
--:-- CET (UTC+1)

16 April 2004 26	Saint-Étienne	2–1	Besançon	Saint-Étienne
--:-- CET (UTC+1)				Stadium: Stade Geoffroy-Guichard

5 March 2004 27	Amiens	1–2	Saint-Étienne
--:-- CET (UTC+1)

14 March 2004 28	Saint-Étienne	1–0	Caen	Saint-Étienne
16:00 CET (UTC+1)				Stadium: Stade Geoffroy-Guichard; Attendance: 24,512; Referee: Eric Brocas

20 March 2004 29	Rouen	0–1	Saint-Étienne
--:-- CET (UTC+1)

27 March 2004 30	Saint-Étienne	0–0	Clermont	Saint-Étienne
--:-- CET (UTC+1)				Stadium: Stade Geoffroy-Guichard

2 April 2004 31	Grenoble	2–2	Saint-Étienne
--:-- CEST (UTC+2)

11 April 2004 32	Saint-Étienne	2–0	Laval	Saint-Étienne
--:-- CEST (UTC+2)				Stadium: Stade Geoffroy-Guichard

23 April 2004 33	Istres	0–2	Saint-Étienne
--:-- CEST (UTC+2)

1 May 2004 34	Saint-Étienne	0–0	Angers	Saint-Étienne
--:-- CEST (UTC+2)				Stadium: Stade Geoffroy-Guichard

7 May 2004 35	Niort	0–1	Saint-Étienne
--:-- CEST (UTC+2)

13 May 2004 36	Saint-Étienne	1–1	Gueugnon	Saint-Étienne
--:-- CEST (UTC+2)				Stadium: Stade Geoffroy-Guichard

16 May 2004 37	Le Havre	1–0	Saint-Étienne
--:-- CEST (UTC+2)

22 May 2004 38	Saint-Étienne	2–1	Châteauroux	Saint-Étienne
--:-- CEST (UTC+2)				Stadium: Stade Geoffroy-Guichard

=== Coupe de France ===
22 November 2003 Seventh round	Belley	0–3	Saint-Étienne	Belley
			Mendy 45'; Compan 77'; Hellebuyck 82'	Stadium: Stade municipal Paul-Chastel; Attendance: 4,268; Referee: Jérôme Goulu

13 December 2003 Eighth round	Saint-Étienne	2–1	Le Puy	Saint-Étienne
	Dogbé 18'; Carteron 88'		Bakouma 67'	Stadium: Stade Geoffroy-Guichard; Attendance: 11,896; Referee: Claude Medam

3 January 2004 Round of 64	Dijon	0–0 (a.e.t.) (3–1 p)	Saint-Étienne	Dijon
18:00 CET (UTC+1)			Bakouma (yellow card) (yellow-red card) 80'	Stadium: Stade Gaston Gérard; Attendance: 5,294; Referee: Stéphane Djiouzi
	Penalties
	Heitzmann (penalty scored); Livramento (penalty scored); Braud (penalty scored)		Bridonneau (penalty scored)

=== Coupe de la Ligue ===
24 September 2003 First round	Saint-Étienne	1–0	Rouen	Saint-Étienne
--:-- CEST (UTC+2)	Compan 83'			Stadium: Stade Geoffroy-Guichard; Attendance: 5,758; Referee: Eric Brocas

28 October 2003 Second round	Saint-Étienne	1–0	Beauvais	Saint-Étienne
19:00 CET (UTC+1)	Dogbé 18'; Jau (yellow card) 40'; Marin (yellow card) 64'; Mendy (yellow card) 81'	Report	Grange (yellow card) 36'; Ekobo (yellow card) 52'; Alcibar (yellow card) 82'	Stadium: Stade Geoffroy-Guichard; Attendance: 9,095; Referee: Geoffroy Guichard

17 December 2003 Round of 16	Lille	2–3	Saint-Étienne	Villeneuve-d'Ascq
16:05 CET (UTC+1)	Tafforeau (yellow card) 22'; Makoun 59'; Brunel (yellow card) 89' (goal) 90'	Report	Hellebuyck 24' (yellow card) 74'; Bridonneau (yellow card) 28'; Marin 62'; Compan 73'	Stadium: Stadium Lille Métropole; Attendance: 7,260; Referee: Bruno Ruffray

14 January 2004 Quarter-finals	Saint-Étienne	2–0	Nice	Saint-Étienne
21:00 CET (UTC+1)	Jau 31'; Compan 53' (pen.)	Report	Cherrad (yellow card) 43'; Pamarot (yellow card) 49'	Stadium: Stade Geoffroy-Guichard; Attendance: 15,194; Referee: Jean-Paul Chaudre

4 February 2004 Semi-finals	Saint-Étienne	2–3 (a.e.t.)	Sochaux	Saint-Étienne
21:00 CET (UTC+1)	Hernandez (yellow card) 8'; Carteron 18'; Compan 22'	Report	Boudaréne (yellow card) 10'; Mathieu 42' (yellow card) 75'; Oruma 61', 104'; Trapasso (yellow card) 112'	Stadium: Stade Geoffroy-Guichard; Attendance: 33,661; Referee: Bertrand Layec
