= 2004–05 AS Saint-Étienne season =

AS Saint-Étienne
2004–05 season
- Head coach: Élie Baup
- Stadium: Stade Bollaert-Delelis
- Ligue 1: 6th
- Coupe de France: Round of 64
- Coupe de la Ligue: Semi-finals
- Top goalscorer: League: Pascal Feindouno (13); All: Frédéric Piquionne (16)
- Average home league attendance: 29,887

The 2004–05 season was the 72nd season in the existence of AS Saint-Étienne and the club's first season back in the top flight of French football. In addition to the domestic league, Saint-Étienne participated in this season's edition of the Coupe de France and the Coupe de la Ligue. The season covered the period from 1 July 2004 to 30 June 2005.

== Competitions ==
=== Overall record ===
Competition	First match	Last match	Starting round	Final position	Record							
Competition	First match	Last match	Starting round	Final position	Pld	W	D	L	GF	GA	GD	Win %
Ligue 1	7 August 2004	28 May 2005	Matchday 1	7th	38	12	17	9	47	34	+13	31.58
Coupe de France	9 January 2005		Round of 64	Round of 64	1	0	0	1	2	3	−1	0.00
Coupe de la Ligue	10 November 2004	March 2005	Round of 32	Semi-finals	4	3	0	1	7	2	+5	75.00
Total					43	15	17	11	56	39	+17	34.88

Source: Competitions

=== Ligue 1 ===
==== League table ====
Pos	Team	Pld	W	D	L	GF	GA	GD	Pts	Qualification or relegation
4	Rennes	38	15	10	13	49	42	+7	55	Qualification to UEFA Cup first round
5	Marseille	38	15	10	13	47	42	+5	55	Qualification to Intertoto Cup third round
6	Saint-Étienne	38	12	17	9	47	34	+13	53	Qualification to Intertoto Cup second round
7	Lens	38	13	13	12	45	39	+6	52	Qualification to Intertoto Cup second round
8	Auxerre	38	14	10	14	48	47	+1	52	Qualification to UEFA Cup first round (Note: Auxerre was qualified for the 2005–06 UEFA Cup as winners of the 2004–05 Coupe de France.)

Source: Ligue 1
Rules for classification: 1) points; 2) goal difference; 3) number of goals scored.

==== Results summary ====
Overall								Home						Away					
Pld	W	D	L	GF	GA	GD	Pts	W	D	L	GF	GA	GD	W	D	L	GF	GA	GD
38	12	17	9	47	34	+13	53	9	8	2	25	7	+18	3	9	7	22	27	−5

Source: Ligue 1

==== Results by round ====
Round	1	2	3	4	5	6	7	8	9	10	11	12	13	14	15	16	17	18	19	20	21	22	23	24	25	26	27	28	29	30	31	32	33	34	35	36	37	38
Ground	H	A	H	A	H	A	H	A	H	A	H	A	H	A	H	A	H	H	A	H	A	H	A	H	A	H	A	H	A	H	A	H	A	H	A	A	H	A
Result	L	L	D	D	D	D	W	L	L	D	D	L	W	W	W	D	D	W	W	D	D	D	D	W	D	W	L	W	L	D	L	W	D	D	W	L	W	D
Position	15	19	18	18	17	16	13	17	17	17	17	17	17	15	11	11	11	10	9	8	8	8	9	10	10	9	10	9	11	8	9	9	9	8	7	7	6	6

Source: Ligue 1
A = Away; H = Home; W = Win; D = Draw; L = Loss

==== Matches ====
7 August 2004 1	Saint-Étienne	0–1	Monaco
CEST (UTC+2)

14 August 2004 2	Lens	3–0	Saint-Étienne
CEST (UTC+2)

21 August 2004 3	Saint-Étienne	1–1	Strasbourg
CEST (UTC+2)

29 August 2004 4	Paris Saint-Germain	2–2	Saint-Étienne
CEST (UTC+2)

11 September 2004 5	Saint-Étienne	0–0	Nantes
CEST (UTC+2)

18 September 2004 6	Ajaccio	1–1	Saint-Étienne
CEST (UTC+2)

22 September 2004 7	Saint-Étienne	3–1	Auxerre
CEST (UTC+2)

25 September 2004 8	Sochaux	2–1	Saint-Étienne
CEST (UTC+2)

3 October 2004 9	Saint-Étienne	2–3	Lyon
CEST (UTC+2)

17 October 2004 10	Marseille	1–1	Saint-Étienne
CEST (UTC+2)

23 October 2004 11	Saint-Étienne	0–0	Bordeaux
CEST (UTC+2)

30 October 2004 12	Lille	1–0	Saint-Étienne
CEST (UTC+2)

6 November 2004 13	Saint-Étienne	2–1	Nice
CEST (UTC+2)

13 November 2004 14	Bastia	0–3	Saint-Étienne
CEST (UTC+2)

20 November 2004 15	Saint-Étienne	1–0	Rennes
CEST (UTC+2)

27 November 2004 16	Metz	2–2	Saint-Étienne
CEST (UTC+2)

4 December 2004 17	Saint-Étienne	0–0	Toulouse
CEST (UTC+2)

11 December 2004 18	Saint-Étienne	5–0	Caen
CEST (UTC+2)

18 December 2004 19	Istres	0–2	Saint-Étienne
CEST (UTC+2)

12 January 2005 20	Saint-Étienne	0–0	Lens
CEST (UTC+2)

15 January 2005 21	Strasbourg	1–1	Saint-Étienne
CEST (UTC+2)

22 January 2005 22	Saint-Étienne	0–0	Paris Saint-Germain
CEST (UTC+2)

26 January 2005 23	Nantes	0–0	Saint-Étienne
CEST (UTC+2)

5 February 2005 25	Auxerre	2–2	Saint-Étienne
CEST (UTC+2)

20 February 2005 26	Saint-Étienne	1–0	Sochaux
CEST (UTC+2)

26 February 2005 27	Lyon	3–2	Saint-Étienne
CEST (UTC+2)

6 March 2005 28	Saint-Étienne	2–0	Marseille
CEST (UTC+2)

12 March 2005 29	Bordeaux	2–0	Saint-Étienne
CEST (UTC+2)

16 March 2005 24	Saint-Étienne	3–0	Ajaccio
CEST (UTC+2)

20 March 2005 30	Saint-Étienne	0–0	Lille
CEST (UTC+2)

2 April 2005 31	Nice	2–0	Saint-Étienne
CEST (UTC+2)

9 April 2005 32	Saint-Étienne	3–0	Bastia
CEST (UTC+2)

16 April 2005 33	Rennes	2–2	Saint-Étienne	Rennes
CEST (UTC+2)

23 April 2005 34	Saint-Étienne	0–0	Metz
CEST (UTC+2)

7 May 2005 35	Toulouse	0–2	Saint-Étienne	Toulouse
CEST (UTC+2)

14 May 2005 36	Caen	2–0	Saint-Étienne	Caen
CEST (UTC+2)

21 May 2005 37	Saint-Étienne	2–0	Istres
CEST (UTC+2)

28 May 2005 38	Monaco	1–1	Saint-Étienne	Monaco
CEST (UTC+2)				Stadium: Stade Louis II

=== Coupe de France ===
9 January 2005 Round of 64	Nîmes	3–2	Saint-Étienne	Nîmes
15:15 CET (UTC+1)	Benhamou 33'; Beyrac 44'; Verschave 68'		Piquionne 7', 8'	Stadium: Stade des Costières; Attendance: 12,909; Referee: Eric Brocas

=== Coupe de la Ligue ===
9 November 2004 Second round	Saint-Étienne	3–1	Créteil	Saint-Étienne
CET (UTC+1)	Piquionne 7', 51'; Carteron 77'		Cavalli 72'	Stadium: Stade Geoffroy-Guichard; Attendance: 13,680; Referee: Philippe Malige

21 December 2004 Third round	Le Havre	0–1	Saint-Étienne	Le Havre
CET (UTC+1)			Hellebuyck 58'	Stadium: Stade Jules Deschaseaux; Attendance: 7,913; Referee: Bruno Ruffray

18 January 2005 Quarter-finals	Lens	0–3	Saint-Étienne	Lens
CET (UTC+1)			Piquionne 21'; Feindouno 74' (pen.); Marin 88'	Stadium: Stade Félix-Bollaert; Attendance: 24,611; Referee: Bertrand Layec

1 February 2005 Semi-finals	Strasbourg	1–0	Saint-Étienne	Strasbourg
CET (UTC+1)	Farnerud 55'			Stadium: Stade de la Meinau; Attendance: 11,307; Referee: Pascal Viléo

== Statistics ==
=== Goalscorers ===
Rank	No.	Pos	Nat	Name	Ligue 1	Coupe de France	Coupe de la Ligue	Total
1	9	FW	(France)	Frédéric Piquionne	11	2	3	16
2	14	MF	(Burkina Faso)	Pascal Feindouno	13	0	1	14
3	27	MF	(France)	Julien Sablé	5	0	0	5
4	25	FW	(France)	Lilian Compan	4	0	0	4
Totals					37	2	7	46
