= 1997–98 AS Saint-Étienne season =

Saint-Étienne
1997–98 season
- President: Philippe Koehl (until October); Jean-Marie Caillat (October–November); Alain Bompard (from December)
- Head coach: Pierre Repellini
- Stadium: Stade Geoffroy-Guichard
- French Division 2: 17th
- Coupe de France: Eighth round
- Coupe de la Ligue: Round of 32
- Top goalscorer: League: Didier Thimothée (19); All: Didier Thimothée (20)
- Biggest win: Saint-Amand FC 0–11 Saint-Étienne
- Biggest defeat: Lorient 4–0 Saint-Étienne; Sochaux 4–0 Saint-Étienne

The 1997–98 season was the 65th season in the existence of AS Saint-Étienne and the club's second consecutive season in the second division of French football. In addition to the domestic league, Saint-Étienne participated in this season's edition of the Coupe de France and the Coupe de la Ligue. The season covered the period from 1 July 1997 to 30 June 1998.

== Pre-season and friendlies ==
Win Draw Loss

4 July 1997 Friendly	Lens (France)	3–0	(France) Saint-Étienne
--:-- CEST (UTC+2)

14 July 1997 Friendly	Saint-Étienne (France)	2–0	(France) Gueugnon
--:-- CEST (UTC+2)

11 April 1998 Friendly	Montpellier (France)	2–0	(France) Saint-Étienne
--:-- CEST (UTC+2)

15 May 1998 Friendly	Saint-Étienne (France)	2–0	(France) Châteauroux
--:-- CEST (UTC+2)

19 May 1998 Friendly	Saint-Étienne (France)	4–0	(France) Nancy
--:-- CEST (UTC+2)

21 May 1998 Friendly	Gueugnon (France)	0–2	(France) Saint-Étienne
--:-- CEST (UTC+2)

== Competitions ==
=== Overview ===
Competition	First match	Last match	Starting round	Final position	Record							
Competition	First match	Last match	Starting round	Final position	Pld	W	D	L	GF	GA	GD	Win %
French Division 2	2 August 1997	8 May 1998	Matchday 1	17th	42	12	15	15	47	60	−13	28.57
Coupe de France	29 November 1997	20 December 1997	Seventh round	Eighth round	2	1	0	1	11	1	+10	50.00
Coupe de la Ligue	5 January 1998		Round of 32	Round of 32	1	0	1	0	1	1	+0	0.00
Total					45	13	16	16	59	62	−3	28.89

Source: Competitions

=== French Division 2 ===
==== League table ====
Pos	Team	Pld	W	D	L	GF	GA	GD	Pts	Promotion or Relegation
15	Nîmes	42	13	13	16	41	51	−10	52	
16	Beauvais	42	11	18	13	40	47	−7	51	
17	Saint-Étienne	42	12	15	15	47	60	−13	51	
18	Wasquehal	42	14	9	19	49	63	−14	51	
19	Louhans-Cuiseaux (R)	42	13	10	19	41	51	−10	49	Relegation to Championnat National [fr]

Source: Ligue 2
(R) Relegated

==== Results summary ====
Overall								Home						Away					
Pld	W	D	L	GF	GA	GD	Pts	W	D	L	GF	GA	GD	W	D	L	GF	GA	GD
42	12	15	15	47	60	−13	51	8	10	3	33	25	+8	4	5	12	14	35	−21

Source: Ligue 2

==== Results by round ====
Round	1	2	3	4	5	6	7	8	9	10	11	12	13	14	15	16	17	18	19	20	21	22	23	24	25	26	27	28	29	30	31	32	33	34	35	36	37	38	39	40	41	42
Ground	H	A	H	A	H	A	H	A	H	A	H	A	H	A	H	A	H	A	H	H	A	H	A	H	A	H	A	H	A	H	A	H	A	H	A	H	A	H	A	A	H	A
Result	D	L	L	L	D	D	D	D	L	L	D	L	W	L	W	W	W	D	D	W	L	D	L	W	L	W	W	D	D	L	W	D	L	W	W	W	L	D	D	L	D	L
Position	8	19	20	21	22	21	21	21	22	22	22	22	21	22	22	21	19	20	17	15	18	19	19	17	20	16	15	16	16	18	16	15	17	16	10	10	13	14	12	15	16	17

Source: Ligue 1
A = Away; H = Home; W = Win; D = Draw; L = Loss

==== Matches ====
2 August 1997 1	Saint-Étienne	2–2	Lille	Saint-Étienne
--:-- CEST (UTC+2)				Stadium: Stade Geoffroy-Guichard

9 August 1997 2	Nîmes	3–0	Saint-Étienne	Nîmes
--:-- CEST (UTC+2)

18 August 1997 3	Saint-Étienne	1–2	Le Mans	Saint-Étienne
--:-- CEST (UTC+2)				Stadium: Stade Geoffroy-Guichard

20 August 1997 4	Red Star	1–0	Saint-Étienne	Paris
--:-- CEST (UTC+2)

23 August 1997 5	Saint-Étienne	0–0	Lorient	Saint-Étienne
--:-- CEST (UTC+2)				Stadium: Stade Geoffroy-Guichard

30 August 1997 6	Amiens	0–0	Saint-Étienne	Amiens
--:-- CEST (UTC+2)

3 September 1997 7	Saint-Étienne	1–1	Troyes	Saint-Étienne
--:-- CEST (UTC+2)				Stadium: Stade Geoffroy-Guichard

6 September 1997 8	Valence	1–1	Saint-Étienne	Valence
--:-- CEST (UTC+2)

13 September 1997 9	Saint-Étienne	0–1	Gueugnon	Saint-Étienne
--:-- CEST (UTC+2)				Stadium: Stade Geoffroy-Guichard

20 September 1997 10	Nancy	2–0	Saint-Étienne	Tomblaine
--:-- CEST (UTC+2)

24 September 1997 11	Saint-Étienne	2–2	Mulhouse	Saint-Étienne
--:-- CEST (UTC+2)				Stadium: Stade Geoffroy-Guichard

28 September 1997 12	Wasquehal	2–1	Saint-Étienne	Wasquehal
--:-- CEST (UTC+2)

4 October 1997 13	Saint-Étienne	3–0	Caen	Saint-Étienne
--:-- CEST (UTC+2)				Stadium: Stade Geoffroy-Guichard

8 October 1997 14	Laval	4–1	Saint-Étienne	Laval
--:-- CEST (UTC+2)

18 October 1997 16	Toulon	0–2	Saint-Étienne	Toulon
--:-- CEST (UTC+2)

26 October 1997 17	Saint-Étienne	3–2	Nice	Saint-Étienne
--:-- CEST (UTC+2)				Stadium: Stade Geoffroy-Guichard

31 October 1997 18	Louhans-Cuiseaux	0–0	Saint-Étienne	Louhans
--:-- CEST (UTC+2)

4 November 1997 15	Saint-Étienne	4–2	Niort	Saint-Étienne
--:-- CEST (UTC+2)				Stadium: Stade Geoffroy-Guichard

8 November 1997 19	Saint-Étienne	1–1	Beauvais	Saint-Étienne
--:-- CEST (UTC+2)				Stadium: Stade Geoffroy-Guichard

14 November 1997 20	Saint-Étienne	3–2	Sochaux	Saint-Étienne
--:-- CEST (UTC+2)				Stadium: Stade Geoffroy-Guichard

22 November 1997 22	Saint-Étienne	1–1	Nîmes	Saint-Étienne
--:-- CEST (UTC+2)				Stadium: Stade Geoffroy-Guichard

18 November 1997 21	Martigues	1–0	Saint-Étienne	Martigues
--:-- CEST (UTC+2)

3 December 1997 23	Le Mans	3–0	Saint-Étienne	Le Mans
--:-- CEST (UTC+2)

6 December 1997 24	Saint-Étienne	1–0	Red Star	Saint-Étienne
--:-- CEST (UTC+2)				Stadium: Stade Geoffroy-Guichard

13 December 1997 25	Lorient	4–0	Saint-Étienne	Lorient
--:-- CEST (UTC+2)

10 January 1998 26	Saint-Étienne	2–1	Amiens	Saint-Étienne
--:-- CEST (UTC+2)				Stadium: Stade Geoffroy-Guichard

21 January 1998 27	Troyes	1–2	Saint-Étienne	Troyes
--:-- CEST (UTC+2)

10 February 1998 30	Saint-Étienne	0–2	Nancy	Saint-Étienne
--:-- CEST (UTC+2)				Stadium: Stade Geoffroy-Guichard

14 February 1998 31	Mulhouse	1–2	Saint-Étienne	Mulhouse
--:-- CEST (UTC+2)

21 February 1998 32	Saint-Étienne	0–0	Wasquehal	Saint-Étienne
--:-- CEST (UTC+2)				Stadium: Stade Geoffroy-Guichard

28 February 1998 28	Saint-Étienne	0–0	Valence	Saint-Étienne
--:-- CEST (UTC+2)				Stadium: Stade Geoffroy-Guichard

3 March 1998 29	Gueugnon	1–1	Saint-Étienne	Gueugnon
--:-- CEST (UTC+2)

7 March 1998 33	Caen	2–0	Saint-Étienne	Caen
--:-- CEST (UTC+2)

14 March 1998 34	Saint-Étienne	3–2	Laval	Saint-Étienne
--:-- CEST (UTC+2)				Stadium: Stade Geoffroy-Guichard

24 March 1998 35	Niort	1–3	Saint-Étienne	Niort
--:-- CEST (UTC+2)

28 March 1998 36	Saint-Étienne	3–1	Toulon	Saint-Étienne
--:-- CEST (UTC+2)				Stadium: Stade Geoffroy-Guichard

7 April 1998 37	Nice	2–0	Saint-Étienne	Nice
--:-- CEST (UTC+2)

18 April 1998 38	Saint-Étienne	2–2	Louhans-Cuiseaux	Saint-Étienne
--:-- CEST (UTC+2)				Stadium: Stade Geoffroy-Guichard

24 April 1998 39	Beauvais	0–0	Saint-Étienne	Beauvais
--:-- CEST (UTC+2)

29 April 1998 40	Sochaux	4–0	Saint-Étienne	Montbéliard
--:-- CEST (UTC+2)

5 May 1998 41	Saint-Étienne	1–1	Martigues	Saint-Étienne
--:-- CEST (UTC+2)				Stadium: Stade Geoffroy-Guichard

8 May 1998 42	Lille	2–1	Saint-Étienne	Lille
--:-- CEST (UTC+2)

=== Coupe de France ===
29 November 1997 Seventh round	Saint-Amand FC	0–11	Saint-Étienne	Clermont-Ferrand
--:-- CEST (UTC+2)				Stadium: Stade Gabriel Montpied; Attendance: 4,500

20 December 1997 Eighth round	Pau	1–0	Saint-Étienne	Pau
--:-- CEST (UTC+2)				Stadium: Stade du Hameau; Attendance: 4,000

=== Coupe de la Ligue ===
8 January 1998 Round of 32	Saint-Étienne	1–1 (2–4 p)	Sochaux	Saint-Étienne
--:-- CEST (UTC+2)	Fichaux 15'		Isabey 90'	Stadium: Stade Geoffroy-Guichard; Attendance: 4,297
