= 2002–03 AS Saint-Étienne season =

AS Saint-Étienne
2002–03 season
- Head coach: Frédéric Antonetti
- Stadium: Stade Geoffroy-Guichard
- Ligue 2: 9th
- Coupe de France: Seventh round
- Coupe de la Ligue: Quarter-finals
- Top goalscorer: League: Patrice Carteron (8); All: Patrice Carteron; Lilian Compan (9)
- Average home league attendance: 14,934
- Biggest win: Saint-Étienne 3–0 Istres; Saint-Étienne 4–1 Amiens
- Biggest defeat: Niort 3–0 Saint-Étienne; Beauvais 3–0 Saint-Étienne; Saint-Étienne 0–3 Gueugnon

The 2002–03 AS Saint-Étienne season was the club's 70th season in existence and the second consecutive season in the second division of French football. In addition to the domestic league, Amiens participated in this season's edition of the Coupe de France and the Coupe de la Ligue. The season covered the period from 1 July 2002 to 30 June 2003.

== Competitions ==
=== Overview ===
Competition	First match	Last match	Starting round	Final position	Record							
Competition	First match	Last match	Starting round	Final position	Pld	W	D	L	GF	GA	GD	Win %
Ligue 2	3 August 2002	23 May 2003	Matchday 1	9th	38	12	15	11	34	30	+4	31.58
Coupe de France	23 November 2002		Seventh round	Seventh round	1	0	0	1	1	3	−2	0.00
Coupe de la Ligue	11 October 2002		First round	Quarter-finals	4	3	0	1	7	6	+1	75.00
Total					43	15	15	13	42	39	+3	34.88

Source: Competitions

=== Ligue 2 ===
==== League table ====
Pos	Team	Pld	W	D	L	GF	GA	GD	Pts
7	Caen	38	12	16	10	45	40	+5	52
8	Laval	38	15	7	16	41	42	−1	52
9	Saint-Étienne	38	12	15	11	34	30	+4	51
10	Amiens	38	12	13	13	30	33	−3	49
11	Gueugnon	38	12	13	13	35	42	−7	49

Source: Ligue 2

==== Results summary ====
Overall								Home						Away					
Pld	W	D	L	GF	GA	GD	Pts	W	D	L	GF	GA	GD	W	D	L	GF	GA	GD
38	12	15	11	34	30	+4	51	11	6	2	26	11	+15	1	9	9	8	19	−11

==== Results by round ====
Round	1	2	3	4	5	6	7	8	9	10	11	12	13	14	15	16	17	18	19	20	21	22	23	24	25	26	27	28	29	30	31	32	33	34	35	36	37	38
Ground	A	H	A	H	A	H	A	H	A	A	H	A	H	A	H	A	H	A	H	A	H	A	H	A	H	A	H	H	A	H	A	H	A	H	A	H	A	H
Result	L	W	L	D	W	D	L	D	D	L	W	L	W	D	D	L	D	L	W	D	W	L	L	D	W	D	D	W	D	W	D	W	D	L	D	W	L	W
Position	12	10	12	14	12	10	14	14	14	16	14	16	14	14	14	16	15	16	14	14	15	15	17	19	18	20	20	16	17	13	13	11	11	13	10	8	10	9

A = Away; H = Home; W = Win; D = Draw; L = Loss

==== Matches ====
3 August 2002 1	Grenoble	1–0	Saint-Étienne	Grenoble
--:-- CEST (UTC+2)

10 August 2002 2	Saint-Étienne	3–0	Istres	Saint-Étienne
--:-- CEST (UTC+2)				Stadium: Stade Geoffroy-Guichard

17 August 2002 3	Amiens	1–0	Saint-Étienne	Amiens
--:-- CEST (UTC+2)

25 August 2002 4	Saint-Étienne	0–0	Reims	Saint-Étienne
--:-- CEST (UTC+2)				Stadium: Stade Geoffroy-Guichard

31 August 2002 5	Gueugnon	0–2	Saint-Étienne	Gueugnon
--:-- CEST (UTC+2)				Stadium: Stade Jean Laville

4 September 2002 6	Saint-Étienne	1–1	Lorient	Saint-Étienne
--:-- CEST (UTC+2)				Stadium: Stade Geoffroy-Guichard

11 September 2002 7	Toulouse	1–0	Saint-Étienne	Toulouse
--:-- CEST (UTC+2)				Stadium: Stadium de Toulouse

14 September 2002 8	Saint-Étienne	0–0	Le Mans	Saint-Étienne
--:-- CEST (UTC+2)				Stadium: Stade Geoffroy-Guichard

20 September 2002 9	Metz	1–1	Saint-Étienne	Metz
--:-- CEST (UTC+2)				Stadium: Stade Saint-Symphorien

28 September 2002 10	Niort	3–0	Saint-Étienne	Niort
--:-- CEST (UTC+2)

5 October 2002 11	Saint-Étienne	2–0	Wasquehal	Saint-Étienne
--:-- CEST (UTC+2)				Stadium: Stade Geoffroy-Guichard

19 October 2002 12	Beauvais	3–0	Saint-Étienne	Beauvais
--:-- CEST (UTC+2)

26 October 2002 13	Saint-Étienne	2–1	Caen	Saint-Étienne
--:-- CEST (UTC+2)				Stadium: Stade Geoffroy-Guichard

2 November 2002 14	Valence	0–0	Saint-Étienne	Valence
--:-- CEST (UTC+2)

9 November 2002 15	Saint-Étienne	1–1	Créteil	Saint-Étienne
--:-- CEST (UTC+2)				Stadium: Stade Geoffroy-Guichard

17 November 2002 16	Nancy	1–0	Saint-Étienne	Nancy
--:-- CEST (UTC+2)

30 November 2002 17	Saint-Étienne	0–0	Châteauroux	Saint-Étienne
--:-- CEST (UTC+2)				Stadium: Stade Geoffroy-Guichard

4 December 2002 18	Laval	1–0	Saint-Étienne	Laval
--:-- CEST (UTC+2)

19 December 2002 19	Saint-Étienne	3–1	Clermont	Saint-Étienne
--:-- CEST (UTC+2)				Stadium: Stade Geoffroy-Guichard

22 January 2003 22	Reims	1–0	Saint-Étienne	Reims
--:-- CEST (UTC+2)

29 January 2003 23	Saint-Étienne	0–3	Gueugnon	Saint-Étienne
--:-- CEST (UTC+2)				Stadium: Stade Geoffroy-Guichard

1 February 2003 24	Lorient	1–1	Saint-Étienne	Lorient
--:-- CEST (UTC+2)

9 February 2003 26	Le Mans	2–2	Saint-Étienne	Le Mans
--:-- CEST (UTC+2)

14 February 2003 20	Istres	0–0	Saint-Étienne	Istres
--:-- CEST (UTC+2)

22 February 2003 27	Saint-Étienne	1–1	Metz	Saint-Étienne
--:-- CEST (UTC+2)				Stadium: Stade Geoffroy-Guichard

28 February 2003 28	Saint-Étienne	2–0	Niort	Saint-Étienne
--:-- CEST (UTC+2)				Stadium: Stade Geoffroy-Guichard

8 March 2003 29	Wasquehal	1–1	Saint-Étienne	Wasquehal
--:-- CEST (UTC+2)

14 March 2003 21	Saint-Étienne	4–1	Amiens	Saint-Étienne
--:-- CEST (UTC+2)				Stadium: Stade Geoffroy-Guichard

22 March 2003 30	Saint-Étienne	1–0	Beauvais	Saint-Étienne
--:-- CEST (UTC+2)				Stadium: Stade Geoffroy-Guichard

28 March 2003 31	Caen	0–0	Saint-Étienne	Caen
--:-- CEST (UTC+2)

5 April 2003 32	Saint-Étienne	2–0	Valence	Saint-Étienne
--:-- CEST (UTC+2)				Stadium: Stade Geoffroy-Guichard

12 April 2003 33	Créteil	0–0	Saint-Étienne	Créteil
--:-- CEST (UTC+2)

19 April 2003 34	Saint-Étienne	0–1	Nancy	Saint-Étienne
--:-- CEST (UTC+2)				Stadium: Stade Geoffroy-Guichard

24 April 2003 25	Saint-Étienne	1–0	Toulouse	Saint-Étienne
--:-- CEST (UTC+2)				Stadium: Stade Geoffroy-Guichard

3 May 2003 35	Châteauroux	1–1	Saint-Étienne	Châteauroux
--:-- CEST (UTC+2)

10 May 2003 36	Saint-Étienne	1–0	Laval	Saint-Étienne
--:-- CEST (UTC+2)				Stadium: Stade Geoffroy-Guichard

16 May 2003 37	Clermont	1–0	Saint-Étienne	Clermont
--:-- CEST (UTC+2)

23 May 2003 38	Saint-Étienne	2–1	Grenoble	Saint-Étienne
--:-- CEST (UTC+2)				Stadium: Stade Geoffroy-Guichard

=== Coupe de France ===
23 November 2002 Seventh round	Aurillac FCA	3–1	Saint-Étienne	Aurillac
--:-- CEST (UTC+2)				Stadium: Stade Jean-Alric

=== Coupe de la Ligue ===
11 October 2002 First round	Saint-Étienne	3–2	Toulouse	Saint-Étienne
--:-- CEST (UTC+2)				Stadium: Stade Geoffroy-Guichard

8 December 2002 Second round	Saint-Étienne	1–0 (a.e.t.)	Le Havre	Saint-Étienne
--:-- CEST (UTC+2)				Stadium: Stade Geoffroy-Guichard

18 January 2003 Round of 16	Saint-Étienne	3–2	Le Mans	Saint-Étienne
--:-- CEST (UTC+2)				Stadium: Stade Geoffroy-Guichard

4 March 2003 Quarter-finals	Saint-Étienne	0–2	Marseille	Saint-Étienne
--:-- CEST (UTC+2)				Stadium: Stade Geoffroy-Guichard
