= Sabri Tabet =

French footballer (born 1977)

Personal information
- Date of birth: August 17, 1977 (age 49)
- Place of birth: Rognac, France
- Height: 1.72 m (5 ft 8 in)
- Position: Forward

Senior career*
Years	Team	Apps	(Gls)
1997–1998	Guingamp	0	(0)
1998–2002	Istres	57	(13)
2002–2003	Clermont	31	(3)
2003–2004	Valence	16	(1)
2004–2006	Clermont	60	(6)
2005	→ Reims (loan)	1	(0)
2006–2008	Créteil	36	(0)
2008–2009	Gap	25	(4)
2009–2010	Cassis Carnoux	6	(2)

International career
2002	Algeria	2	(0)
- * Club domestic league appearances and goals

Sabri Tabet (born August 17, 1977) is a former professional footballer who played as a forward. Born in France, he made two appearances for the Algeria national team.

== International career ==
Tabet made his debut for the Algeria national team on August 20, 2002, in a friendly against DR Congo in Blida. He started the game and was replaced in the 80th minute, with the game ending 1–1. His second cap came less than a month later in a 2002 African Cup qualifier win (1–0) against Namibia in Windhoek. Tabet started the game and was subbed off in the 59th minute by Bouabdellah Daoud. It was his last cap for the team.
