= Karim Fellahi =

French footballer (born 1974)

Personal information
- Date of birth: 31 October 1974 (age 51)
- Place of birth: Épinay-sur-Seine, France
- Height: 1.77 m (5 ft 10 in)
- Position: Midfielder

Senior career*
Years	Team	Apps	(Gls)
1994–2000	Red Star 93	140	(19)
2000–2003	Saint-Étienne	50	(1)
2003–2005	Estoril	64	(14)
2005–2008	Mouscron	56	(8)
2008–2009	FC Brussels	10	(3)
2009–2010	UJA Alfortville	5	(0)
Total		325	(45)
- * Club domestic league appearances and goals

Karim Fellahi (Arabic: كريم فلاحي; born 31 October 1974) is a French former professional footballer who played as a midfielder.
