= Olivier Baudry =

French footballer (1973–2017)

Personal information
- Date of birth: 12 June 1973
- Place of birth: Vannes, France
- Date of death: 1 October 2017 (aged 44)
- Height: 1.87 m (6 ft 2 in)
- Position: Midfielder

Senior career*
Years	Team	Apps	(Gls)
1991–2000	Sochaux	213	(15)
2000–2001	Lausanne-Sport	31	(4)
2001–2003	Saint-Étienne	9	(0)
2003–2004	Belfort		
2004–2005	Giro Lepuix		
2005–2017	SR Delémont		

International career
199?–1996	France U21	9	(0)
1998	Brittany	1	(0)
- * Club domestic league appearances and goals

Olivier Baudry (12 June 1973 – 1 October 2017) was a French professional footballer who played as a midfielder.

== Football career ==
Baudry started his professional career at Sochaux. He climbed up from the youth team to the first team as captain. He followed the team relegations and promotion, until 2000 when he joined Lausanne-Sport in the Swiss Challenge League. He returned to France one year later, to join Saint-Étienne of Ligue 2. He then played two years' amateur football with Belfort of CFA2 and Giro Lepuix in Division d'Honneur (regional league).

In 2005, he joined SR Delémont of the Swiss Challenge League.

== Death ==
Baudry died of pancreatic cancer 1 October 2017, having fought the disease for over five years.
