= Anthony Bartholomé =

French footballer (born 1982)

Personal information
- Date of birth: 10 December 1982 (age 43)
- Height: 1.89 m (6 ft 2 in)
- Position: Defender

Youth career
- Saint-Étienne

Senior career*
Years	Team	Apps	(Gls)
2001–2003	Saint-Étienne		
2003–2004	ASOA Valence	17	(1)
2004–2005	Raith Rovers	26	(0)
2007–2008	Virton	34	(1)
2008–2009	K.V. Kortrijk	9	(0)
- * Club domestic league appearances and goals

Anthony Bartholomé (born 10 December 1982) is a French former professional footballer who played as a defender.
