= Claude Fichaux =

French footballer (born 1969)

Personal information
- Full name: Claude Fichaux
- Date of birth: 24 March 1969 (age 57)
- Place of birth: Colmar, France
- Height: 1.83 m (6 ft 0 in)
- Position: Centre-back

Team information
- Current team: Napoli (assistant)

Senior career*
Years	Team	Apps	(Gls)
1988–1990	Mulhouse		
1990–1994	Lille		
1994–1996	Le Havre		
1996–1999	Saint-Étienne		
1999–2002	Le Mans		
2002–2003	Strasbourg		

Managerial career
- 2003–2009: Strasbourg U19
- 2009–2013: Lille (assistant)
- 2013–2016: Roma (technical director)
- 2016–2019: Marseille (assistant)
- 2019–2021: Lyon (assistant)
- 2022–2023: Al Nassr (assistant)
- 2023-: Napoli (assistant)
- * Club domestic league appearances and goals

Claude Fichaux (born 24 March 1969) is a retired French football midfielder.
