= Jean-Pascal Yao =

French footballer (born 1977)

Jean-Pascal Yao (born 13 January 1977) is a French former professional footballer who played on the professional level for French Ligue 2 clubs ASOA Valence during the 1995–1998 seasons and for Saint-Étienne during the 2001–2003 seasons.
