= Alassane N'Dour =

Senegalese footballer (born 1981)

Personal information
- Date of birth: 12 December 1981 (age 44)
- Place of birth: Dakar, Senegal
- Height: 1.85 m (6 ft 1 in)
- Position: Defensive midfielder

Youth career
- Saint-Étienne

Senior career*
Years	Team	Apps	(Gls)
2001–2004	Saint-Étienne	41	(3)
2003–2004	→ West Bromwich Albion (loan)	2	(0)
2004–2007	Troyes	19	(1)
2007–2008	Walsall	9	(1)
2009–2010	Doxa Drama	7	(0)
Total		78	(5)

International career
2001–2002	Senegal	8	(0)
- * Club domestic league appearances and goals

Alassane N'Dour (born 12 December 1981) is a Senegalese former professional footballer who played as a defensive midfielder. During N'Dour's professional career, he played for clubs in France, England and Greece.

== Career ==
N'Dour played for Saint-Étienne and Troyes, both in France. In 2003–04 he spent time on loan at West Bromwich Albion.

He also played for the Senegal national team and was a participant at the 2002 FIFA World Cup.

In February 2008 N'Dour joined Walsall on loan until the end of the 2007–08 season. His performance in the 2–1 home win against Tranmere Rovers on 5 April 2008 saw him named in the League One Team of the Week.

From 15 May 2009 he signed in Greece, to Doxa Drama, a historic team of Greek football, promoting to the second division in the 2009–10 season as champion of the third Division North.
