= David Hellebuyck =

French footballer (born 1979)

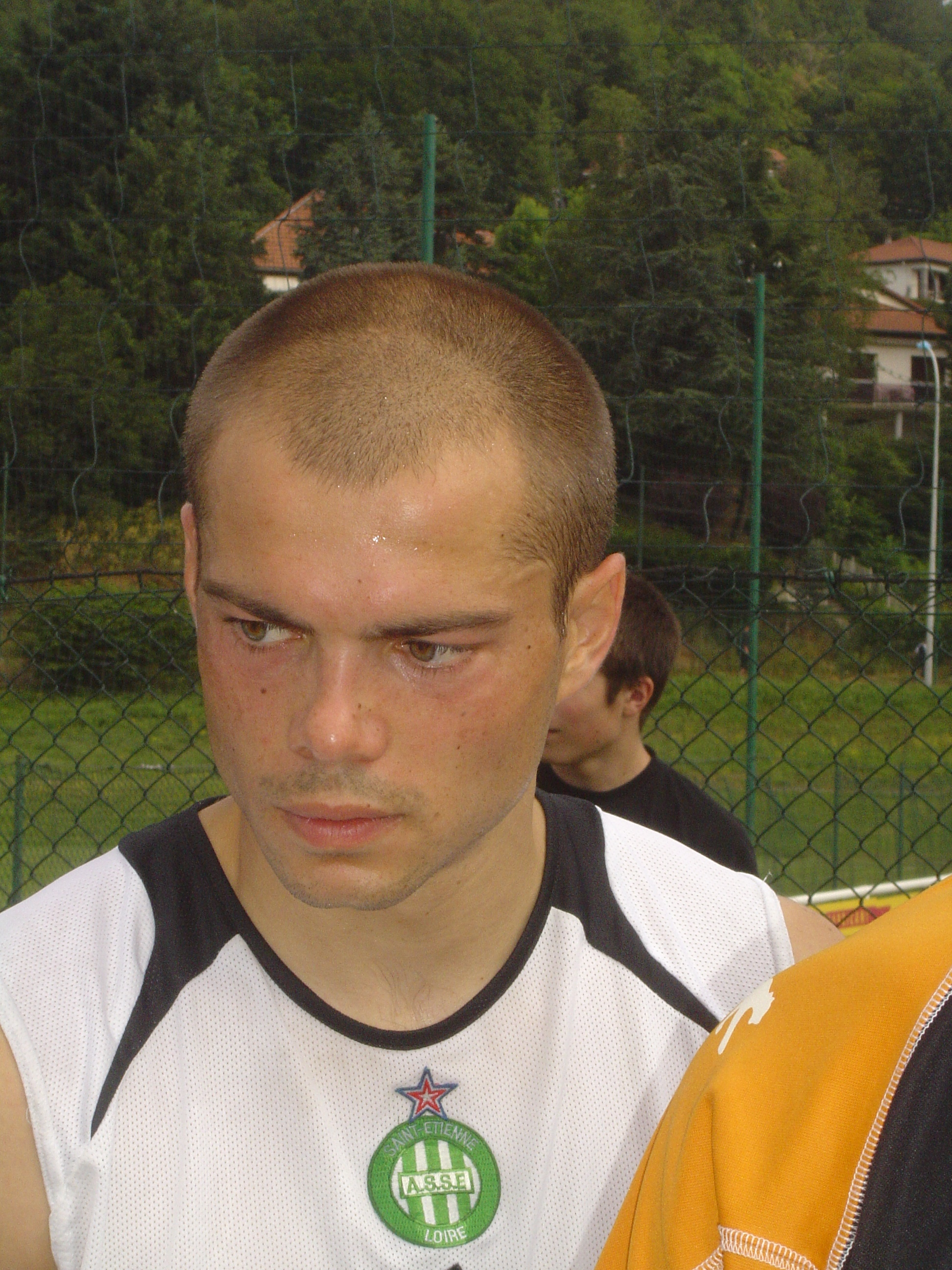
- Hellebuyck with Saint-Étienne

Personal information
- Date of birth: 12 May 1979 (age 47)
- Place of birth: Nantua, France
- Height: 1.78 m (5 ft 10 in)
- Position: Midfielder

Youth career
- 1995–1998: Lyon

Senior career*
Years	Team	Apps	(Gls)
1998–1999	Lyon	3	(0)
1999–2000	→ Guingamp (loan)	18	(1)
2000–2001	Lausanne-Sport	32	(1)
2001–2006	Saint-Étienne	170	(14)
2006–2007	Paris Saint-Germain	12	(1)
2007–2012	Nice	123	(9)
Total		358	(26)

International career
1997	France U18		
- * Club domestic league appearances and goals

David Hellebuyck (born 12 May 1979) is a French former professional footballer who played as a midfielder.

== Career ==
Born in Nantua, Hellebuyck began playing youth football with Lyon. He signed a three-year contract with Spanish club Atlético Madrid at age 17, but the transfer was rejected by FIFA before he could play for Atlético's B team. Hellebuyck eventually made his professional debut with Lyon in 1999, but his relationship with the club was strained and Guy Lacombe was able to recruit him on loan to Guingamp.

He would also play for Lausanne-Sport, Saint-Étienne, Paris Saint-Germain and Nice, making 210 Ligue 1 appearances in total. Hellebuyck ended his playing career at the end of the 2011–12 season due to a recurring knee injury.

Hellebuyck won the 1997 UEFA European Under-18 Championship with France.
