= Lilian Compan =

French footballer (born 1977)

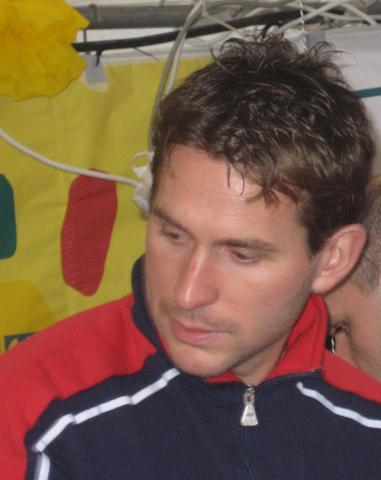

Personal information
- Date of birth: 30 April 1977 (age 49)
- Place of birth: Hyères, France
- Height: 1.82 m (6 ft 0 in)
- Position: Striker

Youth career
- 1992–1993: Hyères
- 1993–1995: Cannes

Senior career*
Years	Team	Apps	(Gls)
1995–1997	Cannes	30	(3)
1997–2002	Auxerre	6	(0)
1998–1999	→ Châteauroux (loan)	23	(9)
2000–2001	→ Créteil (loan)	31	(13)
2001–2002	→ Châteauroux (loan)	30	(14)
2002–2005	Saint-Étienne	74	(16)
2005–2008	Caen	83	(24)
2008–2010	Montpellier	37	(8)
2010–2012	Cannes	22	(4)

International career
1998–1999	France U21	4	(0)

Managerial career
- 2014–2015: US Cannes-la-Bocca
- 2016–2018: Saint-Étienne (youth)
- 2018–: Hyères
- * Club domestic league appearances and goals

Lilian Compan (born 30 April 1977) is a French football manager and former player who played as a striker. After his playing career, Compan was contracted by former club Saint-Étienne in a variety of roles, from scout to U19 team head coach. He eventually resigned to take over the position of manager of Hyères in French fourth tier.
