= 2001–02 FC Gueugnon season =

Season of a football league in France

FC Gueugnon
2001–02 season
- Stadium: Stade Jean Laville
- French Division 2: 14th
- Coupe de France: Eighth round
- Coupe de la Ligue: First round

The 2001–02 season was the 72nd season in the existence of FC Gueugnon and the club's third consecutive season in the second division of French football. In addition to the domestic league, FC Gueugnon competed in this season's edition of the Coupe de France and Coupe de la Ligue. The season covered the period from 1 July 2001 to 30 June 2002.

== Players ==
=== First-team squad ===
Note: Flags indicate national team as defined under FIFA eligibility rules; some limited exceptions apply. Players may hold more than one non-FIFA nationality.

No.	Pos.	Nation	Player
—	GK	FRA	Jean-Marc Branger
—	GK	FRA	Richard Trivino
—	DF	MTN	Pascal Gourville
—	DF	FRA	Florian Boucansaud
—	DF	FRA	Eric Boniface
—	DF	FRA	Christophe Dussart
—	DF	FRA	Olivier Bochu
—	DF	FRA	Eric Vrielynck
—	DF	FRA	Wahid Zaami
—	DF	FRA	Xavier Collin
—	DF	FRA	Yohan Bouzin
—	MF	ARG	Gabriel Lettieri
—	MF	FRA	Didier Neumann
—	MF	FRA	Christophe Ettori

No.	Pos.	Nation	Player
—	MF	ARG	Andrés Grande
—	MF	FRA	Philippe Lucca
—	MF	SEN	Habibou Traoré
—	MF	FRA	Christophe Aubanel
—	MF	ARG	Gustavo Galvan
—	MF	ARG	Nicolas Diez
—	FW	GLP	Olivier Fauconnier
—	FW	SEN	Amara Traoré
—	FW	FRA	Emmanuel Desgeorges
—	FW	ALG	Mansour Boutabout
—	FW	FRA	Jean-François Suchet
—	FW	FRA	Sylvain Flauto
—	FW	FRA	Guillaume Mulak
—	FW	FRA	Vincent Chanlon

== Competitions ==
Win Draw Loss

=== Overall record ===
Competition	First match	Last match	Starting round	Final position	Record							
Competition	First match	Last match	Starting round	Final position	Pld	W	D	L	GF	GA	GD	Win %
Division 2	28 July 2001	3 May 2002	Matchday 1	14th	38	9	17	12	42	49	−7	23.68
Coupe de France	3 November 2001	23 November 2001	Seventh round	Eighth round	2	1	0	1	1	1	+0	50.00
Coupe de la Ligue	September 2001		First round	First round	1	0	0	1	0	2	−2	0.00
Total					41	10	17	14	43	52	−9	24.39

Source: Competitions

=== French Division 2 ===
==== League table ====
Pos	Team	Pld	W	D	L	GF	GA	GD	Pts
12	Amiens	38	11	14	13	46	50	−4	47
13	Saint-Étienne	38	11	13	14	35	42	−7	46
14	Gueugnon	38	9	17	12	42	49	−7	44
15	Wasquehal	38	11	10	17	43	55	−12	43
16	Grenoble	38	10	12	16	38	55	−17	42

Source: Ligue 2

==== Results summary ====
Overall								Home						Away					
Pld	W	D	L	GF	GA	GD	Pts	W	D	L	GF	GA	GD	W	D	L	GF	GA	GD
38	9	17	12	42	49	−7	44	5	9	5	25	23	+2	4	8	7	17	26	−9

Source: Ligue 2

==== Results by round ====
Round	1	2	3	4	5	6	7	8	9	10	11	12	13	14	15	16	17	18	19	20	21	22	23	24	25	26	27	28	29	30	31	32	33	34	35	36	37	38
Ground	H	A	H	A	H	A	H	A	H	A	H	A	A	H	A	H	A	H	A	H	A	H	A	H	A	H	A	H	A	H	H	A	H	A	H	A	H	A
Result	W	W	W	W	D	L	D	D	L	D	W	D	L	D	L	D	W	D	D	D	L	W	D	D	W	D	D	D	D	L	L	L	W	L	L	D	L	L
Position	3	2	1	1	3	4	4	3	6	6	4	5	6	6	11	11	7	8	9	10	11	11	10	9	8	8	8	8	9	11	13	12	10	11	11	11	14	14

Source: Ligue 2
A = Away; H = Home; W = Win; D = Draw; L = Loss

==== Matches ====
	Gueugnon	v	Ajaccio	Gueugnon
--:-- CEST (UTC+2)				Stadium: Stade Jean Laville

	Ajaccio	v	Gueugnon	Ajaccio
--:-- CEST (UTC+2)				Stadium: Stade François Coty

	Gueugnon	v	Amiens	Gueugnon
--:-- CEST (UTC+2)				Stadium: Stade Jean Laville

	Amiens	v	Gueugnon	Amiens
--:-- CEST (UTC+2)				Stadium: Stade de la Licorne

	Gueugnon	v	Beauvais	Gueugnon
--:-- CEST (UTC+2)				Stadium: Stade Jean Laville

	Beauvais	v	Gueugnon	Beauvais
--:-- CEST (UTC+2)				Stadium: Stade Pierre Brisson

	Gueugnon	v	Caen	Gueugnon
--:-- CEST (UTC+2)				Stadium: Stade Jean Laville

	Caen	v	Gueugnon	Caen
--:-- CEST (UTC+2)				Stadium: Stade Michel d'Ornano

	Gueugnon	v	Châteauroux	Gueugnon
--:-- CEST (UTC+2)				Stadium: Stade Jean Laville

	Châteauroux	v	Gueugnon	Châteauroux
--:-- CEST (UTC+2)				Stadium: Stade Gaston-Petit

	Gueugnon	v	Créteil	Gueugnon
--:-- CEST (UTC+2)				Stadium: Stade Jean Laville

	Créteil	v	Gueugnon	Créteil
--:-- CEST (UTC+2)				Stadium: Stade Dominique Duvauchelle

	Gueugnon	v	Grenoble	Gueugnon
--:-- CEST (UTC+2)				Stadium: Stade Jean Laville

	Grenoble	v	Gueugnon	Grenoble
--:-- CEST (UTC+2)				Stadium: Stade Lesdiguières

	Gueugnon	v	Istres	Gueugnon
--:-- CEST (UTC+2)				Stadium: Stade Jean Laville

	Istres	v	Gueugnon	Istres
--:-- CEST (UTC+2)				Stadium: Stade Bernard Bardin

	Gueugnon	v	Laval	Gueugnon
--:-- CEST (UTC+2)				Stadium: Stade Jean Laville

	Laval	v	Gueugnon	Laval
--:-- CEST (UTC+2)				Stadium: Stade Francis Le Basser

	Gueugnon	v	Le Havre	Gueugnon
--:-- CEST (UTC+2)				Stadium: Stade Jean Laville

	Le Havre	v	Gueugnon	Le Havre
--:-- CEST (UTC+2)				Stadium: Stade Jules Deschaseaux

	Gueugnon	v	Le Mans	Gueugnon
--:-- CEST (UTC+2)				Stadium: Stade Jean Laville

	Le Mans	v	Gueugnon	Le Mans
--:-- CEST (UTC+2)				Stadium: Stade Léon-Bollée

	Gueugnon	v	Martigues	Gueugnon
--:-- CEST (UTC+2)				Stadium: Stade Jean Laville

	Martigues	v	Gueugnon	Martigues
--:-- CEST (UTC+2)				Stadium: Stade Francis Turcan

	Gueugnon	v	Nancy	Gueugnon
--:-- CEST (UTC+2)				Stadium: Stade Jean Laville

	Nancy	v	Gueugnon	Tomblaine
--:-- CEST (UTC+2)				Stadium: Stade Marcel Picot

	Gueugnon	v	Nice	Gueugnon
--:-- CEST (UTC+2)				Stadium: Stade Jean Laville

	Nice	v	Gueugnon	Nice
--:-- CEST (UTC+2)				Stadium: Stade du Ray

	Gueugnon	v	Nîmes	Gueugnon
--:-- CEST (UTC+2)				Stadium: Stade Jean Laville

	Nîmes	v	Gueugnon	Nîmes
--:-- CEST (UTC+2)				Stadium: Stade des Costières

	Gueugnon	v	Niort	Gueugnon
--:-- CEST (UTC+2)				Stadium: Stade Jean Laville

	Niort	v	Gueugnon	Niort
--:-- CEST (UTC+2)				Stadium: Stade René Gaillard

	Gueugnon	v	Saint-Étienne	Gueugnon
--:-- CEST (UTC+2)				Stadium: Stade Jean Laville

	Saint-Étienne	v	Gueugnon	Saint-Étienne
--:-- CEST (UTC+2)				Stadium: Stade Geoffroy-Guichard

	Gueugnon	v	Strasbourg	Gueugnon
--:-- CEST (UTC+2)				Stadium: Stade Jean Laville

	Strasbourg	v	Gueugnon	Strasbourg
--:-- CEST (UTC+2)				Stadium: Stade de la Meinau

	Gueugnon	v	Wasquehal	Gueugnon
--:-- CEST (UTC+2)				Stadium: Stade Jean Laville

	Wasquehal	v	Gueugnon	Villeneuve-d'Ascq
--:-- CEST (UTC+2)				Stadium: Stadium Lille Métropole

== Statistics ==
=== Squad statistics ===
No.	Pos	Nat	Player	Total		Division 2		Coupe de France		Coupe de la Ligue			
No.	Pos	Nat	Player	Apps	Goals	Apps	Goals	Apps	Goals	Apps	Goals		
Goalkeepers
1	GK	(France) FRA		0	0	0	0	0	0	0	0	0	0
1	GK	(France) FRA		0	0	0	0	0	0	0	0	0	0
Defenders
1	DF	(France) FRA		0	0	0	0	0	0	0	0	0	0
1	DF	(France) FRA		0	0	0	0	0	0	0	0	0	0
Midfielders
1	MF	(France) FRA		0	0	0	0	0	0	0	0	0	0
1	MF	(France) FRA		0	0	0	0	0	0	0	0	0	0
Forwards
1	FW	(France) FRA		0	0	0	0	0	0	0	0	0	0
1	FW	(France) FRA		0	0	0	0	0	0	0	0	0	0
Players who have made an appearance or had a squad number this season but have left the club
1	GK	(France) FRA		0	0	0	0	0	0	0	0	0	0

=== Goalscorers ===
Rank	No.	Pos	Nat	Name	Division 2	Coupe de France	Coupe de la Ligue	Total	
1	1	FW	(France)		0	0	0	0	
2	2	MF	(France)		0	0	0	0	
2	Totals					0	0	0	0
