= 2003–04 Olympiacos F.C. season =

Olympiacos
2003–04 season
- Chairman: Sokratis Kokkalis
- Manager: Oleh Protasov (until 17 March 2004); Siniša Gogić (until 19 March 2004); Nikos Alefantos (until 31 May 2004)
- Stadium: Georgios Kamaras Stadium
- Alpha Ethniki: Runners-up
- Greek Cup: Runners-up
- Champions League: Group Stage
- Top goalscorer: League: Giovanni (21); All: Giovanni (24)
Home colours	Away colours

The 2003–04 season was Olympiacos's 45th consecutive season in the Alpha Ethniki and their 78th year in existence. The club played their 7th consecutive season in the UEFA Champions League. In the beginning of the summertime Olympiacos named Greek Nikos Alefantos coach.

== Players ==
=== First-team squad ===
Squad at end of season

Note: Flags indicate national team as defined under FIFA eligibility rules; some limited exceptions apply. Players may hold more than one non-FIFA nationality.

No.	Pos.	Nation	Player
1	MF	GRE	Pantelis Kafes
2	DF	GRE	Christos Patsatzoglou
3	DF	GRE	Stelios Venetidis
4	MF	GRE	Andreas Niniadis
5	MF	FRA	Christian Karembeu
6	MF	GRE	Ieroklis Stoltidis
7	FW	MEX	Nery Castillo
8	MF	GRE	Georgios Georgiadis
9	FW	GRE	Lampros Choutos
10	FW	BRA	Giovanni
11	MF	SCG	Predrag Đorđević
12	GK	SVK	Juraj Buček
14	DF	GRE	Dimitris Mavrogennidis
16	GK	GRE	Fanis Katergiannakis
17	MF	GRE	Giannis Taralidis

No.	Pos.	Nation	Player
19	DF	GRE	Athanasios Kostoulas
20	MF	GRE	Takis Gonias
21	FW	POL	Marcin Kuźba
23	FW	GRE	Alexandros Tatsis
25	DF	GRE	Spyros Vallas
26	MF	GRE	Konstantinos Mendrinos
29	GK	GRE	Kleopas Giannou
30	DF	GRE	Anastasios Pantos
31	GK	GRE	Dimitrios Eleftheropoulos
32	DF	GRE	Georgios Anatolakis
33	DF	GRE	Christos Lisgaras
34	GK	GRE	Thodoris Dougeroglou
44	DF	GRE	Efthimios Koulouheris
71	DF	GRE	Grigoris Georgatos

== Competitions ==
=== Alpha Ethniki ===
==== League table ====
Pos	Team	Pld	W	D	L	GF	GA	GD	Pts	Qualification or relegation
1	Panathinaikos (C)	30	24	5	1	62	18	+44	77	Qualification for Champions League group stage
2	Olympiacos	30	24	3	3	70	19	+51	75	Qualification for Champions League group stage
3	PAOK	30	18	6	6	47	27	+20	60	Qualification for Champions League third qualifying round
4	AEK Athens	30	16	7	7	57	32	+25	55	Qualification for UEFA Cup first round
5	Egaleo	30	15	7	8	37	26	+11	52	Qualification for UEFA Cup first round

Source: Galanis Sports Data
Rules for classification: 1st points; 2nd head-to-head points; 3rd head-to-head goal difference; 4th decision match.
(C) Champions

==== Results summary ====
Overall								Home						Away					
Pld	W	D	L	GF	GA	GD	Pts	W	D	L	GF	GA	GD	W	D	L	GF	GA	GD
30	24	3	3	70	19	+51	75	11	2	2	38	9	+29	13	1	1	32	10	+22

Last updated: 22 May 2004.
Source: Competitive matches

==== Results by round ====
Round	1	2	3	4	5	6	7	8	9	10	11	12	13	14	15	16	17	18	19	20	21	22	23	24	25	26	27	28	29	30
Ground	A	H	A	H	A	H	H	A	H	A	H	A	H	A	A	H	A	H	A	H	A	A	H	A	H	A	H	A	H	H
Result	W	W	L	W	W	W	W	W	D	W	D	W	W	W	W	L	W	W	W	W	W	W	L	W	W	D	W	W	W	W
Position	2	1	3	2	2	2	1	1	1	1	1	1	1	1	1	1	1	1	1	1	1	1	2	2	2	2	2	2	2	2

Source: Competitive matches
A = Away; H = Home; W = Win; D = Draw; L = Loss

==== Matches ====
All times at EET

24 August 2003 1	PAOK	0–2	Olympiacos	Thessaloniki
18:15			Georgiadis 18'; Kafes 76'	Stadium: Toumba Stadium; Attendance: 0 (closed doors); Referee: Ioakim Efthymiadis

31 August 2003 2	Olympiacos	7–0	Akratitos	Rizoupoli
19:15	Đorđević 29' (pen.); Mavrogenidis 45', 52'; Choutos 64', 68'; Tatsis 77'; Kafes 80'			Stadium: Georgios Kamaras Stadium; Attendance: 3,151; Referee: Nikolaos Koulias

13 September 2003 3	Proodeftiki	1–0	Olympiacos	Piraeus
18:00	Zajmi 89'			Stadium: Nikaia Municipal Stadium; Attendance: 3,045; Referee: Kyros Vassaras

21 September 2003 4	Olympiacos	1–0	Paniliakos	Rizoupoli
19:00	Giovanni 42'			Stadium: Georgios Kamaras Stadium; Attendance: 7,118; Referee: Gerasimos Mazarakis

27 September 2003 5	Skoda Xanthi	1–3	Olympiacos	Xanthi
18:00	Karakatsanis 80'		Đorđević 72' (pen.), 90+2' (pen.); Gonias 90+3'	Stadium: A.O. Xanthi Stadium; Attendance: 2,794; Referee: Iraklis Tsikinis

5 October 2003 6	Olympiacos	4–1	OFI	Rizoupoli
19:00	Castillo 19', 40', 62'; Giovanni 65'		Bykowski 90+1'	Stadium: Georgios Kamaras Stadium; Attendance: 11,088; Referee: Christoforos Zografos

18 October 2003 7	Olympiacos	2–0	Kallithea	Rizoupoli
19:00	Castillo 59'; Giovanni 70'			Stadium: Georgios Kamaras Stadium; Attendance: 7,132; Referee: Kyros Vassaras

26 October 2003 8	AEK Athens	0–1	Olympiacos	Nea Smyrni
21–00			Stoltidis 67'	Stadium: Nea Smyrni Stadium; Attendance: 8,310; Referee: Thanasis Briakos

2 November 2003 9	Olympiacos	2–2	Ionikos	Rizoupoli
18:00	Giovanni 3', 20'		Lettieri 41'; Frousos 88'	Stadium: Georgios Kamaras Stadium; Attendance: 9,249; Referee: Michalis Germanakos

9 November 2003 10	Iraklis	1–3	Olympiacos	Thessaloniki
18:30	Xenidis 83'		Giovanni 43'; Georgiadis 50'; Đorđević 70'	Stadium: Makedonikos Stadium; Attendance: 3,218; Referee: Georgios Douros

22 November 2003 11	Olympiacos	1–1	Panathinaikos	Rizoupoli
19:00	Stoltidis 60'		Konstantinou 36'	Stadium: Georgios Kamaras Stadium; Attendance: 9,639; Referee: Kyros Vassaras

30 November 2003 12	Panionios	1–2	Olympiacos	Nea Smyrni
19:00	Pino 24'		Giovanni 4'; Castillo 38'	Stadium: Nea Smyrni Stadium; Attendance: 4,657; Referee: Ioakim Efthimiadis

6 December 2003 13	Olympiacos	1–0	Chalkidona	Rizoupoli
20:00	Đorđević 39' (pen.)			Stadium: Georgios Kamaras Stadium; Attendance: 8,114; Referee: Michalis Germanakos

14 December 2003 14	Aris	0–3	Olympiacos	Thessaloniki
19:00			Giovanni 28', 65'; Đorđević 32'	Stadium: Kalamaria Stadium; Attendance: 3,171; Referee: Ioannis Spiropoulos

21 December 2003 15	Egaleo	1–2	Olympiacos	Aigaleo
19:00	Agritis 68'		Giovanni 15'; Georgiadis 90+2'	Stadium: Stavros Mavrothalassitis Stadium; Attendance: 3,356; Referee: Georgios Douros

11 January 2004 16	Olympiacos	1–2	PAOK	Rizoupoli
18:00	Castillo 67'		Salpingidis 68'; Spasić 87'	Stadium: Georgios Kamaras Stadium; Attendance: 9,164; Referee: Giannis Spyropoulos

18 January 2004 17	Akratitos	0–5	Olympiacos	Ano Liosia
19:00			Đorđević 40' (pen.); Kuźba 74', 80'; Giovanni 83'; Stoltidis 86'	Stadium: Giannis Pathiakakis Stadium; Attendance: 1,810; Referee: Dimitrios Kalopoulos

25 January 2004 18	Olympiacos	4–0	Proodeftiki	Rizoupoli
19:00	Georgiadis 6'; Kafes 15'; Giovanni 18'; Mavrogenidis 33'			Stadium: Georgios Kamaras Stadium; Attendance: 5,360; Referee: Kyros Vassaras

1 February 2004 19	Paniliakos	1–3	Olympiacos	Pyrgos
17:00	Sotirhos 89' (pen.)		Giovanni 24', 72', 84'	Stadium: Pyrgos Stadium; Attendance: 3,636; Referee: Georgios Borovilos

8 February 2004 20	Olympiacos	4–1	Skoda Xanthi	Rizoupoli
17:00	Georgiadis 27' (pen.); Stoltidis 68'; Giovanni 78'; Kafes 84'		Dimitriadis 66'	Stadium: Georgios Kamaras Stadium; Attendance: 10,621; Referee: Christoforos Zografos

22 February 2004 21	OFI	0–1	Olympiacos	Heraklion
17:00			Giovanni 70'	Stadium: Theodoros Vardinogiannis Stadium; Attendance: 3,728; Referee: Georgios Borovilos

28 February 2004 22	Kallithea	1–2	Olympiacos	Kallithea
19:30	Angelopoulos 60'		Vallas 24'; Koulakiotis 68' (o.g.)	Stadium: Grigoris Lambrakis Stadium; Attendance: 3,800; Referee: Vasileios Terovitsas

14 March 2004 23	Olympiacos	0–1	AEK Athens	Rizoupoli
19:00			Lakis 85'	Stadium: Georgios Kamaras Stadium; Attendance: 11,311; Referee: Giorgos Kasnaferis

21 March 2004 24	Ionikos	1–2	Olympiacos	Piraeus
19:30	Makor 55'		Đorđević 37' (pen.); Vallas 79'	Stadium: Neapoli Stadium; Attendance: 3,618; Referee: Fragiskos Somarakis

4 April 2004 25	Olympiacos	3–0	Iraklis	Rizoupoli
20:00	Giovanni 11', 71'; Vallas 55'			Stadium: Georgios Kamaras Stadium; Attendance: 11,346; Referee: Vasileios Terovitsas

18 April 2004 26	Panathinaikos	2–2	Olympiacos	Ampelikipoi
20:30	Basinas 7' (pen.); Goumas 81'		Stoltidis 44'; Đorđević 54'	Stadium: Leoforos Alexandras Stadium; Attendance: 11,699; Referee: Georgios Douros

25 April 2004 27	Olympiacos	2–0	Panionios	Rizoupoli
19:00	Đorđević 4'; Kuźba 22'			Stadium: Georgios Kamaras Stadium; Attendance: 8,997; Referee: Vasileios Terovitsas

2 May 2004 28	Chalkidona	0–1	Olympiacos	Piraeus
19:00			Castillo 9'	Stadium: Neapoli Stadium; Attendance: 2,762; Referee: Kyros Vassaras

16 May 2004 29	Olympiacos	3–0	Aris	Rizoupoli
19:00	Georgiadis 56'; Georgatos 78'; Giovanni 82'			Stadium: Georgios Kamaras Stadium; Attendance: 3,563; Referee: Emmanouil Tapatzas

22 May 2004 30	Olympiacos	3–1	Egaleo	Rizoupoli
17:15	Giovanni 27'; Kuźba 58', 70'		Agritis 31'	Stadium: Georgios Kamaras Stadium; Attendance: 4,228; Referee: Georgios Borovilos

=== Greek Cup ===
==== First round ====
9 September 2003 First leg	Olympiacos	3–2	Ergotelis	Livadeia
17:00 EEST	Niniadis 16'; Stoltidis 44', 88'	Report (page 13)	Sylla 21'; Ogunsoto 52'	Stadium: Levadia Municipal Stadium; Referee: Christoforos Zografos (Athens)

29 October 2003 Second leg	Ergotelis	1–3 (3–6 agg.)	Olympiacos	Heraklion
15:00 EET	Ogunsoto 65'	Report (page 13)	Niniadis 30', 64'; Kafes 52'	Stadium: Pankritio Stadium; Referee: Kostas Finokaliotis (Athens)

==== Second round ====
Olympiacos qualified to the Round of 16 without a match.

==== Round of 16 ====
7 January 2004 First leg	Olympiacos	1–0	Skoda Xanthi	Rizoupoli
20:00 EET	Georgatos 11'	Report (page 15-16)		Stadium: Georgios Kamaras Stadium; Attendance: 3,882; Referee: Giannis Kaminaris (Thessaly)

21 January 2004 Second leg	Skoda Xanthi	0–2 (0–3 agg.)	Olympiacos	Xanthi
17:00 EET		Report (page 16)	Giovanni 52'; Castillo 62' (pen.)	Stadium: Skoda Xanthi Arena; Attendance: 1,702; Referee: Giorgos Kasnaferis (Argolida)

==== Quarter-finals ====
11 February 2004 First leg	Olympiacos	1–0	Panionios	Rizoupoli
20:00 EET	Georgiadis 61' (pen.)	Report (page 17)		Stadium: Georgios Kamaras Stadium; Attendance: 6,420; Referee: Giannis Spyropoulos (Phthiotis)

3 March 2004 Second leg	Panionios	0–0 (0–1 agg.)	Olympiacos	Nea Smyrni
19:00 EET		Report (page 17)		Stadium: Nea Smyrni Stadium; Attendance: 3,550; Referee: Thanasis Briakos (Epirus)

==== Semi-finals ====
7 April 2004 First leg	Kastoria	0–3	Olympiacos	Kastoria
16:00 EEST		Report (page 18)	Georgatos 15'; Choutos 19'; Kuźba 77'	Stadium: Municipal Stadium of Kastoria; Attendance: 8,000; Referee: Manolis Tapatzas (Thrace)

21 April 2004 Second leg	Olympiacos	1–1 (4–1 agg.)	Kastoria	Rizoupoli
20:00 EEST	Niniadis 73' (pen.)	Report (page 18)	Lazaridis 45'	Stadium: Georgios Kamaras Stadium; Attendance: 2,147; Referee: Fragiskos Somarakakis (Athens)

==== Final ====
8 May 2004 Final	Panathinaikos	3–1	Olympiacos	Nea Smyrni
21:00 EEST	Papadopoulos 3'; Konstantinou 68', 80'	Report (pages 18-19)	Giovanni 65'	Stadium: Nea Smyrni Stadium; Attendance: 7,500; Referee: Giorgos Kasnaferis (Argolida)

=== UEFA Champions League ===
==== Group stage ====
Pos	Team	Pld	W	D	L	GF	GA	GD	Pts	Qualification
1	(Italy) Juventus	6	4	1	1	15	6	+9	13	Advance to knockout stage
2	(Spain) Real Sociedad	6	2	3	1	8	8	0	9	Advance to knockout stage
3	(Turkey) Galatasaray	6	2	1	3	6	8	−2	7	Transfer to UEFA Cup
4	(Greece) Olympiacos	6	1	1	4	6	13	−7	4	

Source: RSSSF

All times at CET

17 September 2003 1	Real Sociedad (Spain)	1–0	(Greece) Olympiacos	San Sebastián, Spain
20:45	Kovačević 80' (pen.)	Report		Stadium: Anoeta Stadium; Attendance: 28,000; Referee: Knud Erik Fisker (Denmark)

30 September 2003 2	Olympiacos (Greece)	1–2	(Italy) Juventus	Athens, Greece
20:45	Stoltidis 11'	Report	Nedvěd 21', 79'	Stadium: Georgios Kamaras Stadium; Attendance: 14,000; Referee: Éric Poulat (France)

21 October 2003 3	Galatasaray (Turkey)	1–0	(Greece) Olympiacos	Istanbul, Turkey
20:45	Cihan 9'	Report		Stadium: Atatürk Olympic Stadium; Attendance: 41,125; Referee: Urs Meier (Switzerland)

5 November 2003 4	Olympiacos (Greece)	3–0	(Turkey) Galatasaray	Athens, Greece
20:45	Mavrogenidis 6'; Castillo 34'; Giovanni 90+6'	Report		Stadium: Georgios Kamaras Stadium; Attendance: 14,000; Referee: Ľuboš Micheľ (Slovakia)

25 November 2003 5	Olympiacos (Greece)	2–2	(Spain) Real Sociedad	Athens, Greece
20:45	Stoltidis 59'; Castillo 71'	Report	Gabilondo 31'; Schürrer 74'	Stadium: Georgios Kamaras Stadium; Attendance: 14,000; Referee: Alain Hamer (Luxembourg)

10 December 2003 6	Juventus (Italy)	7–0	(Greece) Olympiacos	Turin, Italy
20:45	Trezeguet 14', 25'; Miccoli 19'; Maresca 28'; Di Vaio 62'; Del Piero 67'; Zalayeta 79'	Report		Stadium: Stadio delle Alpi; Attendance: 12,575; Referee: Konrad Plautz (Austria)

== Team kit ==
Supplier: Umbro
Sponsor(s): Siemens Mobile

Home	Away	Home (2)

Source: Olympiacos FC

== Individual Awards ==
Name	Pos.	Award
(Brazil) Giovanni	Forward	Alpha Ethniki Best Foreign Player; Alpha Ethniki Golden Boot
