= Stéphane Roda =

French footballer (born 1973)

Personal information
- Full name: Stéphane Roda
- Date of birth: 16 June 1973 (age 53)
- Place of birth: Cagnes-sur-Mer, France
- Height: 1.80 m (5 ft 11 in)
- Position: Midfielder

Senior career*
Years	Team	Apps	(Gls)
1996–1997	Aurillac		
1997–1998	Metz	0	(0)
1998–2000	Gueugnon	50	(11)
2000–2003	Strasbourg	39	(2)
2003–2004	Angers	31	(5)
2004–2006	Le Havre	46	(3)
2006–2007	Fréjus		
- * Club domestic league appearances and goals

Stéphane Roda (born 16 June 1973) is a French former professional football midfielder.

During his career Roda played for Aurillac, Metz, Gueugnon, Strasbourg, Angers, Le Havre and Fréjus.

Roda played in the 2000 Coupe de la Ligue Final and helped Gueugnon win the 1999–2000 Coupe de la Ligue.

== Honours ==
Gueugnon

- Coupe de la Ligue: 2000
