= Didier Neumann =

French footballer (born 1977)

Personal information
- Date of birth: 13 January 1977 (age 49)
- Place of birth: Pont-à-Mousson, France
- Height: 1.80 m (5 ft 11 in)
- Position: Midfielder

Senior career*
Years	Team	Apps	(Gls)
1993–1999	Metz B	133	(10)
1998–1999	Metz	1	(0)
1999–2003	Gueugnon	127	(1)
2003–2006	Sedan	76	(4)
2006–2008	Montpellier	28	(1)
2008–2010	Laval	64	(2)
2010–2011	Cannes	12	(0)
Total		441	(18)
- * Club domestic league appearances and goals

Didier Neumann (born 13 January 1977) is a French former professional footballer who played as a midfielder.

== Career ==
Neumann was born in Pont-à-Mousson. He played in the 2000 Coupe de la Ligue Final and helped FC Gueugnon win the 1999–2000 Coupe de la Ligue.

== Honours ==
Gueugnon

- Coupe de la Ligue: 2000
