= 2000 Coupe de la Ligue final =

Association football match

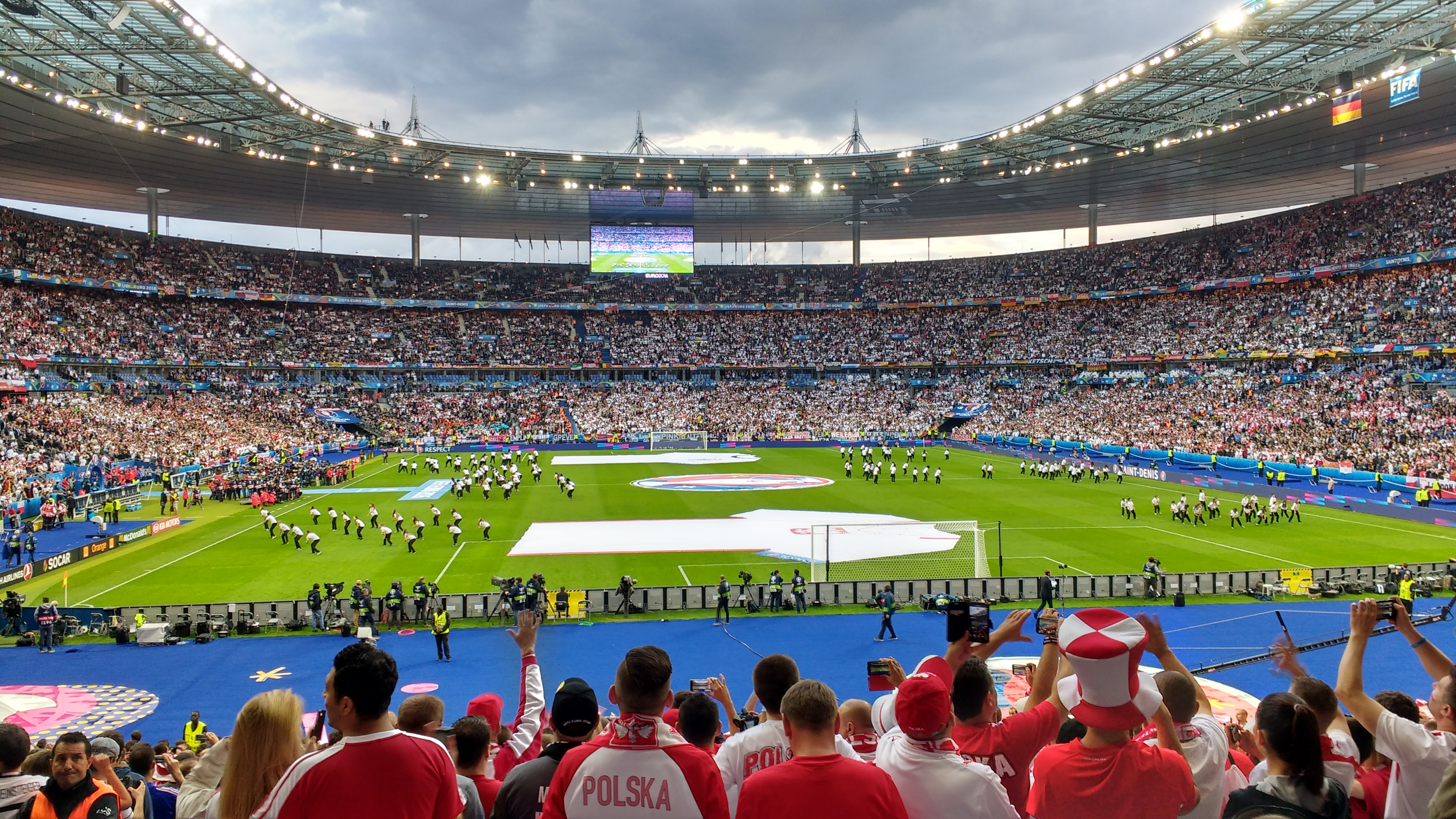
- Event: 1999–2000 Coupe de la Ligue
Gueugnon	Paris Saint-Germain
Division 2	Division 1
2	0
- Date: 22 April 2000
- Venue: Stade de France, Saint-Denis
- Referee: Éric Poulat
- Attendance: 75,317

The 2000 Coupe de la Ligue final was a football match held at Stade de France, Saint-Denis on 22 April 2000, that saw Gueugnon of Division 2 defeat Paris Saint-Germain 2–0 thanks to goals by Marcelo Trapasso and Sylvain Flauto.

== Route to the final ==
Note: In all results below, the score of the finalist is given first (H: home; A: away).

Gueugnon		Round	Paris Saint-Germain	
Opponent	Result	1999–2000 Coupe de la Ligue	Opponent	Result
Niort (A)	1–0	Second round	Créteil (H)	4–3
Toulouse (H)	1–0	Round of 16	Châteauroux (A)	1–0
Strasbourg (H)	2–0	Quarter-finals	Nancy (H)	3–0
Red Star (A)	2–2 (a.e.t.) (9–8 p)	Semi-finals	Bastia (H)	4–2

== Match details ==
22 April 2000
20:45

Gueugnon	2–0	Paris Saint-Germain
Trapasso 65'; Flauto 90'

Stade de France, Saint-Denis
Attendance: 75,317
Referee: Éric Poulat

FC GUEUGNON:
GK	16	(France) Richard Trivino
DF	4	(France) Éric Boniface
DF	2	(France) Yohan Bouzin
DF	15	(France) Sylvain Distin
MF	6	(France) Didier Neumann	(substituted off) 80'
MF	10	(France) Nicolas Esceth-N'Zi	(substituted off) 76'
MF	22	(France) David Fanzel
MF	25	(France) Cédric Chabert
MF	28	(Argentina) Marcelo Trapasso
FW	21	(France) Stéphane Roda	(substituted off) 85'
FW	11	(Senegal) Amara Traoré (c)
Substitutes:
FW	24	(France) Sylvain Flauto	(substituted on) 76'
MF	5	(France) Fabien Weber	(substituted on) 80'
DF	14	(France) Xavier Collin	(substituted on) 85'
Unused substitutes:
GK	1	(France) Philippe Schuth
FW	13	(France) David Andreani
Manager:
(France) Alex Dupont Assistant Referees: Daniel Bequignat; Jean-Claude Lefranc; Fourth Official: Philippe Kalt

PARIS SAINT-GERMAIN FC:
GK	16	(France) Dominique Casagrande
DF	26	(Senegal) Aliou Cissé	(yellow card) 53'
DF	15	(France) Éric Rabésandratana
DF	4	(Morocco) Talal El Karkouri
MF	9	(Algeria) Ali Benarbia (c)
MF	23	(France) Pierre Ducrocq
MF	10	(Nigeria) Jay-Jay Okocha
MF	11	(France) Laurent Robert		(substituted off) 76'
MF	22	(Russia) Igor Yanovsky
FW	19	(France) Laurent Leroy		(substituted off) 72'
FW	7	(Brazil) Christian
Substitutes:
FW	8	(France) Kaba Diawara		(substituted on) 72'
MF	18	(Albania) Edvin Murati		(substituted on) 76'
Unused substitutes:
GK	1	(France) Bernard Lama
DF	6	(Nigeria) Godwin Okpara
MF	20	(France) Édouard Cissé
Manager:
(France) Philippe Bergeroo

== See also ==
- 2000 Coupe de France final
- 1999–2000 Paris Saint-Germain FC season
