= Marcelo Trapasso =

Argentinian association football player

Personal information
- Full name: Marcelo Luis Trapasso
- Date of birth: 30 April 1976 (age 50)
- Place of birth: Argentina
- Position: Forward

Senior career*
Years	Team	Apps	(Gls)
1995–1997	Argentinos Juniors	26	(5)
1997–1998	Atlanta	11	(0)
1998–1999	Almagro	26	(0)
1999–2000	All Boys	15	(5)
2000–2001	Gueugnon	39	(10)
2001–2005	Sochaux	51	(5)
2005–2006	Châteauroux	19	(3)
- * Club domestic league appearances and goals

Marcelo Luis Trapasso (born 30 April 1976) is an Argentine former footballer who is last known to have played as a midfielder for Châteauroux.

== Career ==
Trapasso started his career with Argentine top flight side Argentinos Juniors, where he made 26 league appearances and scored 5 goals, and suffered relegation to the Argentine second tier. In 1997, Trapasso signed for Atlanta in the Argentine second tier. In 2000, he signed for French second-tier club Gueugnon, helping them win the 99-00 Coupe de la Ligue, and scoring in the final, their only major trophy.

In 2001, he signed for Sochaux in the French Ligue 1, helping them win the 2003–04 Coupe de la Ligue, their only Coupe de la Ligue win. In 2005, Trapasso signed for French second-tier team Châteauroux.

== Honours ==
Gueugnon

- Coupe de la Ligue: 1999–2000
