= Philippe Schuth =

French footballer (1966–2002)

Personal information
- Date of birth: 15 December 1966
- Place of birth: Forbach, France
- Date of death: 20 February 2002 (aged 35)
- Place of death: Custines, France
- Height: 1.80 m (5 ft 11 in)
- Position: Goalkeeper

Senior career*
Years	Team	Apps	(Gls)
1982–1983	Merlebach		
1983–1987	Strasbourg	70	(0)
1987–1988	Angers	4	(0)
1988–1990	Dunkerque	63	(0)
1990–1992	Metz	8	(0)
1993–1998	Lorient		
1998–1999	Toulouse	0	(0)
1999–2001	Gueugnon	42	(0)
2001–2002	Nancy	15	(0)
- * Club domestic league appearances and goals

Philippe Schuth (15 December 1966 – 20 February 2002) was a French professional footballer who played as a goalkeeper.

== Career ==
Philippe Schuth, born in 1966 in Forbach, was the son of goalkeeper Johnny Schuth, winner of the 1966 Coupe de France final with Racing Club de Strasbourg. Philippe joined the same club in 1982. In 1983, he was part of the France B1 junior team alongside Alain Roche and Christophe Galtier. Schuth began playing football with Merlebach, before turning professional with RC Strasbourg in 1983. He later played for Angers SCO, US Dunkerque, FC Metz, FC Lorient, Toulouse FC, FC Gueugnon and AS Nancy.

== Death ==
Schuth died in an automobile accident in Custines in February 2002.

== Honours ==
Gueugnon

- Coupe de la Ligue: 1999–2000
