= Olivier Fauconnier =

Guadeloupean footballer (born 1976)

Personal information
- Full name: Olivier Toutoute Fauconnier
- Date of birth: 22 June 1976 (age 50)
- Place of birth: Les Abymes, Guadeloupe
- Height: 1.87 m (6 ft 2 in)
- Position: Centre forward

Senior career*
Years	Team	Apps	(Gls)
1994–1995	Siroco Les Abymes		
1995–1996	L'Etoile de Morne-à-l'Eau		
1996–1998	Lens B	13	(0)
1998–2001	Olympique Alès	33	(10)
2001–2002	Gueugnon	30	(8)
2002–2004	Le Havre	50	(10)
2004	Nice	2	(0)
2004	→ Angers (loan)	11	(1)
2005	→ Ajaccio (loan)	4	(0)
2005–2006	Nice B		
2007	Henan Jianye	7	(4)

International career
2003	Guadeloupe	2	(0)
- * Club domestic league appearances and goals

Olivier Toutoute Fauconnier (born 22 June 1976) is a Guadeloupean former footballer who played as a centre forward. He has been a member of the Guadeloupe team.

== Club career ==
Fauconnier has played in the Metropolitan French Ligue 1 for Le Havre AC, OGC Nice and AC Ajaccio and in China for Henan Jianye.

== International career ==
Fauconnier capped for Guadeloupe at senior level during the 2003 CONCACAF Gold Cup qualification (CFU Qualifying Tournament final round).
