= Éric Boniface =

French footballer (born 1969)

Personal information
- Date of birth: 2 November 1969 (age 56)
- Place of birth: Paris, France
- Height: 1.86 m (6 ft 1 in)
- Position: Defender

Senior career*
Years	Team	Apps	(Gls)
1986–1990	Sochaux	1	(0)
1990–1997	Louhans-Cuiseaux		
1997–1999	Sochaux	48	(4)
1999–2002	Gueugnon	102	(3)
2002–2003	Reims	22	(0)
2004–2006	FC Montceau		
- * Club domestic league appearances and goals

Éric Boniface (born 2 November 1969) is a French former professional footballer who played as defender. He made 10 appearances in Ligue 1 for FC Sochaux-Montbéliard in the 1998–99 season. He coached at USC Paray and is now a coach at Dijon.

Boniface also played 283 matches in Ligue 2 for Sochaux, Stade de Reims, CS Louhans-Cuiseaux and FC Gueugnon between 1990 and 2002.

His younger brother Frédéric also played football professionally.

== Honours ==
Gueugnon

- Coupe de la Ligue: 1999–2000
