= Pascal Gourville =

French footballer (born 1975)

Personal information
- Full name: Pascal Dominique Gourville
- Date of birth: 12 January 1975 (age 51)
- Place of birth: Moissy-Cramayel, France
- Height: 1.85 m (6 ft 1 in)
- Position: Defender

Youth career
- 1995–1997: ASA Montereau

Senior career*
Years	Team	Apps	(Gls)
1997–1998	Sénart-Moissy	30	(4)
1998–1999	Valenciennes	22	(1)
1999–2000	Le Mans	32	(5)
2000–2002	Sedan	7	(0)
2002	→ Gueugnon (loan)	11	(1)
2002–2004	Grenoble	26	(0)
2004–2005	Seyssinet-Pariset	1	(0)
2005–2007	Sénart-Moissy	43	(5)
2007–2008	Bois-Guillaume	1	(0)

International career
2003–2012	Mauritania	14	(0)
- * Club domestic league appearances and goals

Pascal Dominique Gourville (born 12 January 1975) is a retired professional footballer who played as a defender. Born in France, Gourville represented the Mauritania national team internationally.

== International career ==
Gourville was born in France and is of Réunionnais descent. In 2003, he agreed to become a naturalized citizen of Mauritania, following an invitation by fellow Frenchman Noel Tosi, who was then the coach of the Mauritania national team and wanted him in the squad. He made his debut for them in a 3–0 2006 FIFA World Cup qualification loss to Zimbabwe on 12 October 2003.
