= Xavier Collin =

French footballer (born 1974)

Personal information
- Date of birth: 17 August 1974 (age 52)
- Place of birth: Charmes, France
- Height: 1.74 m (5 ft 9 in)
- Position: Defender

Senior career*
Years	Team	Apps	(Gls)
1993–1997	Épinal	127	(0)
1997–1998	Poitiers	34	(0)
1998–1999	Amiens	18	(0)
1999–2002	Gueugnon	81	(0)
2002–2008	Ajaccio	203	(1)
2008–2011	Montpellier	55	(0)
Total		518	(1)

Managerial career
- 2011–2015: Béziers
- 2016–2021: Épinal
- 2021–2022: Orléans
- 2023–2025: Andrézieux-Bouthéon
- * Club domestic league appearances and goals

Xavier Collin (born 17 August 1974) is a French football coach and former professional footballer.

== Playing career ==
During an 18-year playing career, he played as a defender for Épinal, Poitiers, Amiens, Gueugnon, Ajaccio and Montpellier.

== Coaching career ==
In June 2011, Collin was appointed manager of Championnat de France amateur Group A side AS Béziers. He left AS Béziers in 2015. He was later appointed as Épinal manager. After five years managing the club, he left at the end of his contract in May 2021 to take the head coach position at Orléans.

In 2023, he was appointed head coach at Andrézieux-Bouthéon.

== Honours ==
Gueugnon

- Coupe de la Ligue: 1999–2000
