= Frédéric Boniface =

French footballer (born 1971)

Personal information
- Full name: Frédéric André Boniface
- Date of birth: 12 October 1971 (age 55)
- Place of birth: Paris, France
- Height: 1.89 m (6 ft 2 in)
- Position: Forward

Senior career*
Years	Team	Apps	(Gls)
1994–1996	Cercle Dijon		
1996–1997	Stade Poitevin		
1997–1998	Boulogne		
1998	Olympique Noisy-le-Sec		
1998–1999	ES Fréjus		
1999–2000	Paris FC		
2000–2001	Clyde	8	(2)
2001–2002	Olympique Noisy-le-Sec		
2002	Reims	3	(0)
2002–2003	Cherbourg		
2003–2005	FC Chalon		
2005–2006	Montceau		
- * Club domestic league appearances and goals

Frédéric André Boniface (born 12 October 1971) is a French former professional footballer who played as a forward. He played for Reims in Ligue 2, and had a lengthy career in the third tier of French football, as well as playing for Clyde in Scottish Division One.

== Life and career ==
Boniface was born in Paris. His older brother, Éric, had a long career in football as a centre back. Boniface played for a number of clubs in the Championnat National, the third tier of French football. These included Cercle Dijon, Stade Poitevin, Boulogne, Olympique Noisy-le-Sec, ES Fréjus and Paris FC.

In September 2000, he was a member of the Noisy team that beat Amiens in a league match. Amiens challenged his eligibility, and the FFF upheld their protest and awarded them the victory. Noisy's manager was confident that the decision would be reversed on appeal.

Meanwhile, Boniface moved to Scotland, where his girlfriend was intending to study, and after training with Clyde, he signed a two-year contract with the injury-hit Division One club. He scored his first goal for Clyde in his fifth match, in a 3–1 win against Airdrie, and again ten days later with a powerful, albeit deflected, free kick against Raith Rovers. The Sunday Herald's reporter described him as "a striker who would look as comfortable in a bar room brawl as leading the line. He's broad, likes to mix it and his touch is shrewd." However, Clyde manager Allan Maitland lost patience with the player's failure to adapt to the team's style of play, and with the club in serious financial difficulty, Boniface's contract was cancelled in January 2001.

Also in January, the FFF rejected Noisy's appeal, confirming their position in the relegation zone. The decision was based on a regulation dubbed "unjust" by Le Parisien's correspondent, who believed its restrictions had a disproportionate effect on those clubs whose weaker financial situation made them less able to employ players on semiprofessional federal contracts. Boniface rejoined the club during the second half of that season, helping them retain their third-tier status, and stayed on for 2001–02; his ten goals were not enough to save the team this time. He was the first of the squad to confirm he would be leaving; although disappointed at the way the season ended, he would remember Noisy as a club that gave a chance to youngsters and players from ethnic minorities, both black and those of Arab origins.

At the age of 30, Boniface signed a one-year contract with Reims in May 2002, to move into Ligue 2 for the first time in his career. Asked if such a move was not rather unexpected, he pointed to his consistency over the past season and suggested that Reims must think he had something to offer at that level if they wanted to sign him. Boniface made his Reims debut on 10 August 2002, in the second match of the 2002–03 Ligue 2 season, as a second-half substitute in a goalless draw with Metz, and played the whole of the next match, at home to Le Mans, in which his brother Éric scored an 89th-minute own goal to give the visitors the win. His next and final Ligue 2 appearance was in December, playing the whole of a 2–0 away defeat against Toulouse.

Boniface finished the season back in the National with Cherbourg, and then dropped down a further two divisions to play for FC Chalon of the Championnat de France Amateur 2. He spent the 2005–06 season with another fifth-tier club, Montceau.
