= Christophe Ettori =

French footballer (born 1977)

Personal information
- Date of birth: 14 December 1977 (age 48)
- Place of birth: Ajaccio, France
- Position: Midfielder

Senior career*
Years	Team	Apps	(Gls)
1998–2001	Cannes	63	(4)
2001–2002	Gueugnon	26	(1)
2002–2003	Ionikos		
2003	Gazélec Ajaccio		
2003–2004	Créteil	39	(3)
2004–2005	AEK Larnaca		
2005–2007	Toulon		
2007–2009	Gazélec Ajaccio		
- * Club domestic league appearances and goals

Christophe Ettori (born 14 December 1977) is a French former professional footballer who played as a midfielder.

== Early life ==
As a youth player, Ettori joined the youth academy of French side Toulouse, before being promoted to the club's reserve team.

== Playing career ==
Ettori started his senior club career with French side Cannes, before playing for Gueugnon, Greek side Ionikos, Gazélec Ajaccio, Créteil, and Cypriot side AEK Larnaca after receiving interest from a Chinese side. While playing for AEK Larnaca, he was arrested and spent a week in prison in Cyprus. In total, he made 116 appearances in the French Ligue 2 during his playing career.

== Style of play ==
Ettori mainly operated as a midfielder.

== Post-playing career ==
After retiring from professional football, Ettori worked as the sporting director of French side Gazélec Ajaccio. A few years into his tenure as Gazélec Ajaccio sporting director, he was known for his passionate yet calm temperament. Besides serving as sporting director, he also served as president of Gazélec Ajaccio, and was regarded by some as the "pillar of the club". In 2012, he helped the club achieve promotion from the French third tier to the French Ligue 2 . In 2015, he helped them achieve promotion from the French second tier to the French Ligue 1. In 2021, he was arrested as part of a money laundering investigation.

== Personal life ==
Ettori has been married and has two children. He is the brother of Mickaël Ettori, a member of Corsican criminal organization Gang du Petit Bar.
