= Alex Dupont (footballer) =

French football player and manager (1954–2020)

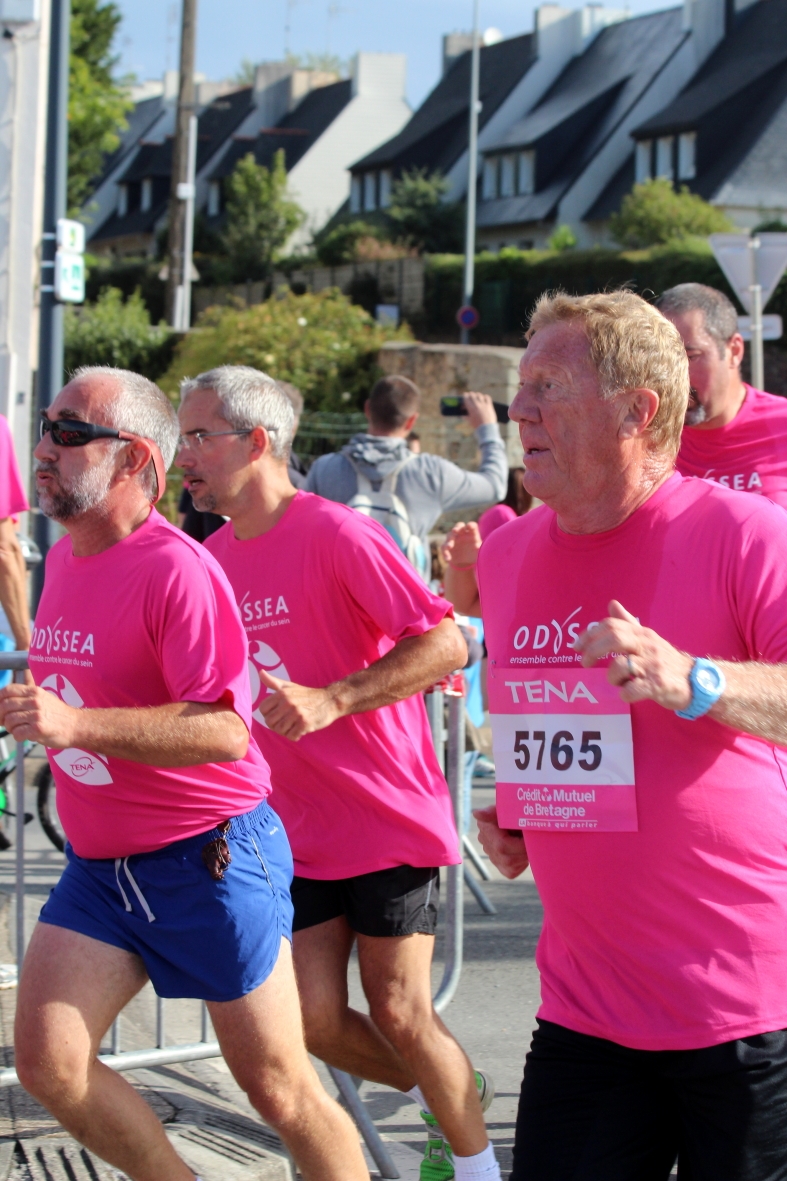
- Dupont (right) in 2013

Personal information
- Full name: Alex Jacques René Dupont
- Date of birth: 30 June 1954
- Place of birth: Dunkirk, France
- Date of death: 1 August 2020 (aged 66)
- Place of death: La Turbie, France
- Height: 1.75 m (5 ft 9 in)
- Position: Midfielder

Youth career
- 1964–1972: Dunkerque

Senior career*
Years	Team	Apps	(Gls)
1972–1975	Dunkerque	1	(0)
1975–1978	Hazebrouck	67+ (Note: Statistics unknown for the 1977–78 season.)	(0+)
1978–1983	Dunkerque	72	(0)
Total		140+	(0+)

Managerial career
- 1984–1985: Dunkerque
- 1990–1996: Dunkerque
- 1997: Charleville
- 1997–1998: Boulogne
- 1998–2000: Gueugnon
- 2000–2001: Sedan
- 2001–2002: Qatar (assistant)
- 2004: Laval
- 2004–2006: Amiens
- 2006–2007: United Arab Emirates U21
- 2007–2008: Gueugnon
- 2009–2012: Brest
- 2012: Ajaccio
- 2013–2016: Brest
- * Club domestic league appearances and goals

Alex Jacques René Dupont (30 June 1954 – 1 August 2020) was a French professional football player and manager.

== Playing career ==
Dupont played as a midfielder for Dunkerque and Hazebrouck.

== Managerial career ==
He managed Dunkerque, Charleville, Boulogne, Gueugnon, with whom he won the Coupe de la Ligue in 2000, Sedan, Laval and Amiens. He replaced Gérald Baticle as manager of Brest in 2009.

On 26 April 2012, he was sacked as Brest manager after just five games before the end of the season, bringing in Corentin Martins as interim manager.

On 22 June 2012, Dupont was named as head coach of Ligue 1 side Ajaccio. He was sacked on 17 December 2012.

He returned to manage Brest in 2013. At the end of the 2015–16 Ligue 2 season, the club did not renew his contract.

== Death ==
Dupont died from cardiac arrest on 1 August 2020.

== Honours ==
=== Manager ===
Gueugnon

- Coupe de la Ligue: 1999–2000

Individual

- Ligue 2 Manager of the Year: 2009–10
