= Amara Traoré =

Senegalese footballer (born 1965)

Personal information
- Date of birth: 25 September 1965 (age 61)
- Place of birth: Saint-Louis, Senegal
- Height: 1.86 m (6 ft 1 in)
- Position: Striker

Team information
- Current team: Horoya AC (head coach)

Youth career
- 1986–1987: ETICS Mboro

Senior career*
| Years | Team | Apps | (Gls) |
| 1988–1990 | Bastia | 54 | (22) |
| 1990–1992 | Le Mans | 40 | (6) |
| 1992–1996 | Gueugnon | 137 | (58) |
| 1996–1997 | Metz | 24 | (6) |
| 1997–1998 | Châteauroux | 18 | (3) |
| 1998 | Al Wahda FC | | |
| 1999–2003 | Gueugnon | 113 | (39) |
| Total | | 386 | (134) |

International career
| 1987–2002 | Senegal | 36 | (14) |

Managerial career
- 2007–2009: ASC Linguère
- 2009–2012: Senegal
- 2013: AS Kaloum
- 2013–: Horoya AC
- * Club domestic league appearances and goals

Amara Traoré (born 25 September 1965) is a Senegalese former professional footballer who is the head coach of Horoya AC in the Guinée Championnat National.

He managed the Senegal national team and ASC Linguère in Senegal.

== Playing career ==
Traoré played for several teams, including Bastia, Gueugnon, Metz, all in France. (Note: Amara Traoré – French league stats at LFP – also available in French (archived)) He holds Senegalese and French nationalities.

He also played for the Senegal national team and was a participant at the 2002 FIFA World Cup.

== Managerial career ==
Traoré was named manager of the Senegal national team in December 2009, and served in that capacity for more than two years, until February 2012. In March 2013, he took the head coaching job with the Guinean side AS Kaloum.

== Honours ==
Gueugnon

- Coupe de la Ligue: 1999–2000
