= Florian Boucansaud =

French footballer (born 1981)

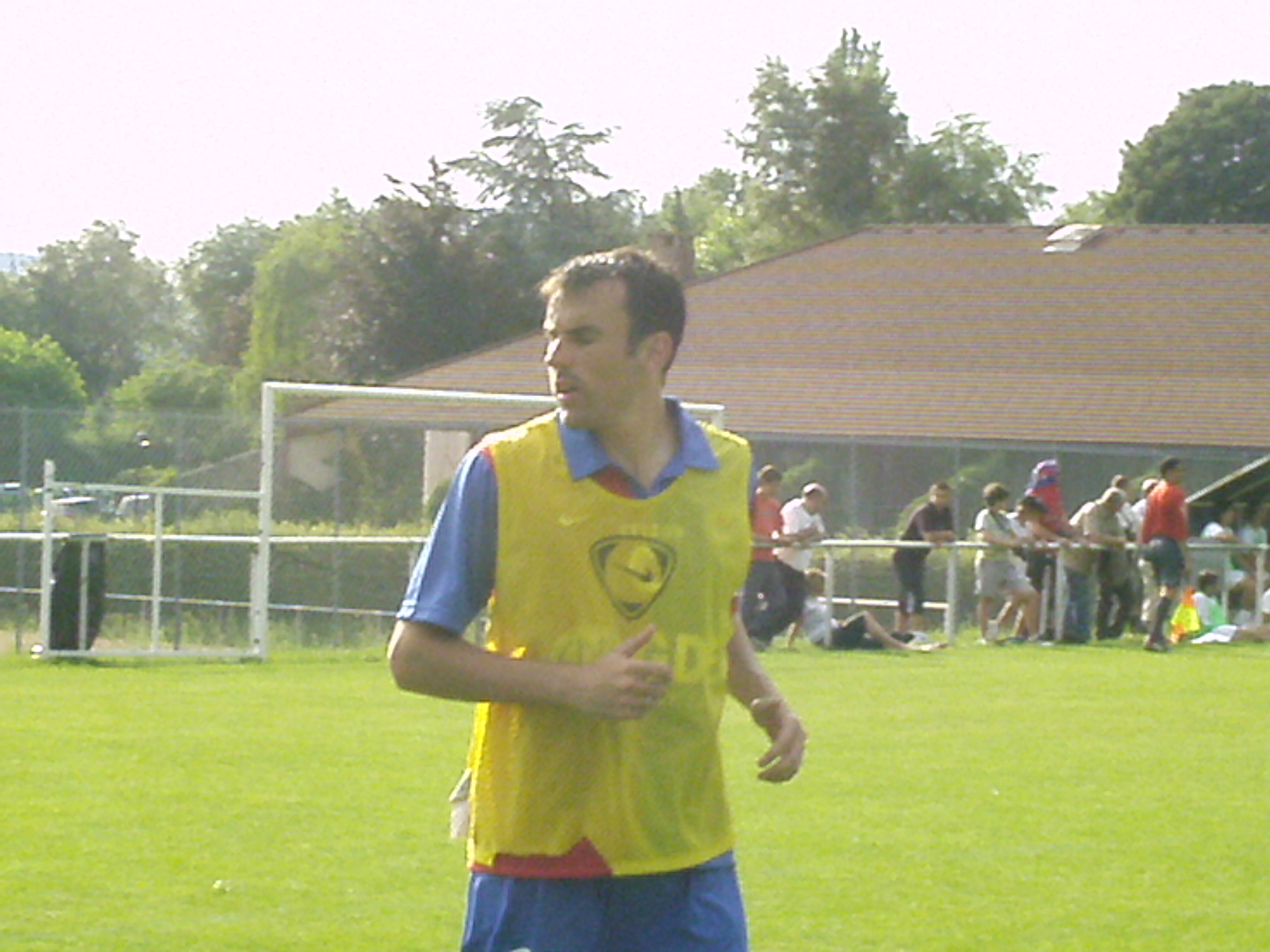

Personal information
- Full name: Florian Boucansaud
- Date of birth: 15 February 1981 (age 45)
- Place of birth: Noisy-le-Sec, France
- Height: 1.86 m (6 ft 1 in)
- Position: Defender

Youth career
- 1999–2001: FC Gueugnon

Senior career*
Years	Team	Apps	(Gls)
2001–2005	FC Gueugnon	80	(4)
2005–2007	Troyes AC	30	(1)
2007–2009	SM Caen	19	(0)
2010–2017	Montceau Bourgogne	204	(6)
- * Club domestic league appearances and goals

Florian Boucansaud (born 15 February 1981) is a French retired professional footballer who played as a defender.
