= Richard Trivino =

French footballer (born 1977)

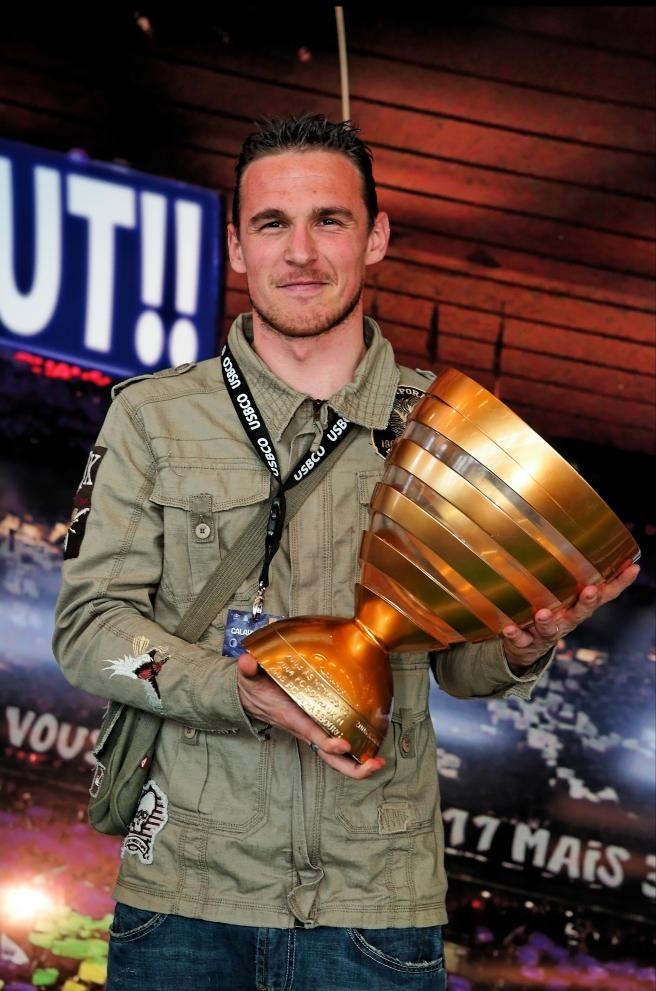
- Trivino in 2008

Personal information
- Date of birth: 5 June 1977 (age 49)
- Place of birth: Paray-le-Monial, France
- Height: 1.83 m (6 ft 0 in)
- Position: Goalkeeper

Senior career*
Years	Team	Apps	(Gls)
1996–2004	Gueugnon	138	(0)
2004–2007	US Créteil	112	(0)
2007–2008	Metz	2	(0)
2008	→ Boulogne (loan)	14	(0)
2008–	US Créteil	103	(0)
2011–2012	Digoin FCA		
2012–2016	Gueugnon		

International career
?–1998	France U21s	0	(0)
- * Club domestic league appearances and goals

Richard Trivino (born 5 June 1977) is a French former professional footballer who played as a goalkeeper.

He won the French League Cup in 2000 and played in the UEFA Cup with FC Gueugnon.

== Honours ==
Gueugnon

- Coupe de la Ligue: 1999–2000
