= Gabriel Lettieri =

Argentine footballer

Personal information
- Full name: Gabriel Leonardo Lettieri
- Date of birth: March 1, 1975 (age 51)
- Place of birth: Buenos Aires, Argentina
- Position: Midfielder

Senior career*
Years	Team	Apps	(Gls)
1995–1997	Huracán	48	(3)
1998–2000	All Boys	-	
2000–2002	FC Gueugnon	-	
2003–2007	Ionikos	101	(4)
2007–2008	Kallitheta	-	
2008–2011	Panargiakos F.C.	-	
- * Club domestic league appearances and goals

Gabriel Lettieri is an Argentine football midfielder He was born on March 1, 1975, in Buenos Aires in Argentina.

Lettieri started his career in 1995 with Club Atlético Huracán in the Primera Division Argentina. In 1998, he was transferred to Primera B side All Boys.

In 2000, he moved to Europe to play for French club FC Gueugnon.
