= Achilleas Angelopoulos =

Greek footballer

Personal information
- Full name: Achilleas Angelopoulos
- Date of birth: 31 March 1977 (age 49)
- Place of birth: Trikala, Greece
- Height: 1.85 m (6 ft 1 in)
- Position: Defender

Senior career*
Years	Team	Apps	(Gls)
1995–2001	Trikala	76	(2)
2001	→ Nafpaktiakos Asteras (loan)	11	(0)
2001–2006	Kallithea	77	(2)
2006–2007	Agrotikos Asteras	28	(0)
2007–2009	Panthrakikos	45	(0)
2009–2010	Pierikos	3	(0)
2010	Trikala	5	(0)
2010–2011	Agrotikos Asteras	15	(0)
2011–2012	Ethnikos Gazoros		
- * Club domestic league appearances and goals as of 1 July 2011

Achilleas Angelopoulos (Greek: Αχιλλέας Αγγελόπουλος; born 31 March 1977) is a Greek former professional footballer who played as a centre back.

== Career ==
Born in Trikala, Angelopoulos began his professional football career by joining the local side Trikala F.C. in February 1995. He later played for Kallithea and Panthrakikos in the Super League Greece.
