= 1999–2000 Coupe de la Ligue =

French League Cup

Tournament details
- Country: France
- Dates: 16 November 1999 – 22 April 2000
- Teams: 42

Final positions
- Champions: Gueugnon (1st title)
- Runners-up: Paris Saint-Germain

Tournament statistics
- Matches played: 40
- Goals scored: 110 (2.75 per match)
- Top goal scorer: Richard Akiana (4 goals)

The 1999–2000 Coupe de la Ligue began on 16 November 1999 and the final took place on 22 April 2000 at the Stade de France. Lens were the defending champions, but were knocked-out by Toulouse in the Second round. Gueugnon went on to win the tournament, beating Paris Saint-Germain 2–0 in the final.

== First round ==
The matches were played on 16 and 24 November 1999.

Team 1	Score	Team 2
Beauvais	2–2 (a.e.t.) (5–4 p)	Valence
Toulouse	1–0	Martigues
Niort	3–2 (a.e.t.)	Laval
Caen	1–2	Le Mans
Lorient	1–1 (a.e.t.) (1–4 p)	Créteil
Sochaux	3–0	Ajaccio
Nice	1–0	Cannes
Lille	1–1 (a.e.t.) (1–4 p)	Red Star
Wasquehal	4–4 (a.e.t.) (4–5 p)	Châteauroux

== Second round ==
The matches were played on 7, 8, and 9 January 2000.

Team 1	Score	Team 2
Beauvais	1–1 (a.e.t.) (5–4 p)	Le Havre
Auxerre	0–0 (a.e.t.) (4–5 p)	Monaco
Troyes	0–1 (a.e.t.)	Bordeaux
Red Star	4–2 (a.e.t.)	Nîmes
Lyon	3–1	Amiens
Strasbourg	0–0 (a.e.t.) (2–0 p)	Metz
Toulouse	3–2 (a.e.t.)	Lens
Le Mans	1–1 (a.e.t.) (5–6 p)	Châteauroux
Paris Saint-Germain	4–3	Créteil
Niort	0–1	Gueugnon
Louhans-Cuiseaux	0–1	Nancy
Sochaux	2–0	Rennes
Saint-Étienne	3–1	Nantes
Guingamp	1–3	Montpellier
Nice	0–1	Sedan
Bastia	3–0	Marseille

== Round of 16 ==
The matches were played on 19, 20 January and 10 February 2000.

Team 1	Score	Team 2
Châteauroux	0–1	Paris Saint-Germain
Nancy	2–1 (a.e.t.)	Sochaux
Lyon	1–0	Bordeaux
Bastia	1–0	Montpellier
Beauvais	0–1	Sedan
Saint-Étienne	1–3	Red Star
Gueugnon	1–0	Toulouse
Monaco	2–3	Strasbourg

== Quarter-finals ==
The matches were played on 19 and 20 February 2000.

Team 1	Score	Team 2
Paris Saint-Germain	3–0	Nancy
Lyon	0–1 (a.e.t.)	Bastia
Sedan	0–1	Red Star
Gueugnon	2–0	Strasbourg

== Semi-finals ==
The matches were played on 1 and 3 April 2000.

Team 1	Score	Team 2
Paris Saint-Germain	4–2	Bastia
Red Star	2–2 (a.e.t.) (8–9 p)	Gueugnon

== Final ==
The final was played on 22 April 2000 at the Stade de France.

22 April 2000
20:45

Gueugnon	2–0	Paris Saint-Germain
Trapasso 65'; Flauto 90'

Stade de France, Saint-Denis
Attendance: 75,317
Referee: Éric Poulat
