= FC Gueugnon =

French football club

- Full name: Football Club Gueugnonnais
- Nickname: Les Forgerons (The Blacksmiths)
- Founded: 1940; 86 years ago
- Ground: Stade Jean Laville, Gueugnon
- Capacity: 14,753
- Chairman: Bernard Canard
- Manager: Philippe Correia
- League: Régional 1 Bourgogne-Franche-Comté
- 2025–26: Régional 1 Bourgogne-Franche-Comté Group A, 4th of 12
- Website: www.fcgueugnon.fr
Home colours	Away colours

Football Club Gueugnonnais (commonly called Gueugnon [ɡøɲɔ̃]) is a French association football club based in Gueugnon, Burgundy. The club was formed in 1940 and plays its home matches at the Stade Jean Laville located within the city.

The club has spent majority of its history in the second and third tiers of French football, with a short spell in the top flight. It has had success at national level, most notably winning the League Cup in 2000, Ligue 2 in 1979 and reaching the semi-finals of the French Cup in 1991.

The club faced bankruptcy in 2011 and subsequently reformed in the sixth tier; since then it has aimed to climb back up the league pyramid.

== History ==
Football Club de Gueugnon was founded in 1940. Upon the club's creation, it earned the nickname Les Forgerons (The Blacksmiths), due to having strong support from the commune's local steelworks area. The club won the Championnat de France amateur in 1947 and, by 1970, were playing in the second division of French football. In 1974, inspired by playmaker Casimir Nowotarski, Gueugnon reached the second division promotion play-offs, but lost to Rouen. In 1979, the club won the second division title, however, due to the club's non-professional status and its inability to gain professional status by the start of the 1979–80 season, it was not allowed to participate in the first division.

The 1980s steel crisis forced the club to turn professional, and after several seasons of struggles to prevent relegation, the tide turned in 1991 when Gueugnon reached the semi-finals of the Coupe de France where the club was defeated by AS Monaco. In 1995, Gueugnon earned were officially promoted to Division 1 for the first time in the club's history after finishing runner-up in the second division, behind EA Guingamp. The promotion was short-lived, though, as the club returned to the lower league after an unsuccessful debut season.

In 2000, Gueugnon shocked French football supporters around the country after winning the Coupe de la Ligue. The club defeated the two-time champions of the competition Paris Saint-Germain 2–0 in the final. The victory resulted in Gueugnon becoming the first and only club to win the cup while playing in Ligue 2. The resulting success led to drastic consequences as many of the club's top players such as Sylvain Distin departed the club for better sporting and monetary opportunities. The following season, Gueugnon played the UEFA Cup but lost to Greek club Iraklis 1–0 on aggregate in the first round. After that season, the club hovered mid-table and just barely avoided relegation in 2004 with a 5–0 win over Lorient on the final match day of the season. The 2007–08 season proved disastrous with the club remaining blocked in the last position for most of the season. With only five wins overall, Gueugnon were relegated to third-tier National.

At the beginning of the season 2009–10, former French international Tony Vairelles joined the club and, subsequently, became the club's main investor. On 27 October 2009, his father, Guy Vairelles, became Gueugnon's new chairman.

The club continued to play in the Championnat National, until entering liquidation in April 2011. In the summer of 2011, the club was reformed and joined the DH Bourgogne at the sixth tier of French football. Gueugnon won DH Bourgogne in 2012–13 season and was promoted to CFA 2.

== Rivalries ==
Most Gueugnon supporters consider Montceau Bourgogne and Louhans-Cuiseaux as the club primary rivals due to each club's close proximity to each other.

Montceau are Gueugnon's historic rivals with both club being separated by less than 16 kilometres (9.9 mi). Gueugnon's rivalry with Montceau stems from the early 80s, in which the latter chairman Gérard Clayeux attempted by pry away several of Gueugnon's top players by offering to increase their wages. The resulting outcry led to the town, club, and support of Gueugnon developing a hatred towards their nearby foes. Gueugnon have a remarkable record against its rivals. The club has never lost a league game against Montceau, however, due to the club's not being in the same league for 20 years, the record has become skewed. On 20 October 2009, Gueugnon and Montceau faced off against each other in the Coupe de France. Montceau were surprise winners defeating Gueugnon 3–1, thus beating Gueugnon for the first ever time in an official competition.

Louhans-Cuiseaux have always been one of Gueugnon's rivals. Not only because the two clubs are relatively close to each other or because they have been in the same division for a long period of time, but also because Gueugnon sent Louhans down by holding them 1–1 on the last day of the Ligue 2 season in 1984–85. Since the 2008–09 season, the two clubs regularly met due to each playing in the Championnat National.

== Crest ==
(1995–2000)

== Players ==
Below are the notable former players who have represented Gueugnon in league and international competition since the club's foundation in 1940. To appear in the section below, a player must have played in at least 80 official matches for the club.

For a complete list of Gueugnon players, see Category:FC Gueugnon players

- Jean Acédo
- François Bandera
- Jean Claude Berthommier
- Éric Boniface
- Florian Boucansaud
- Jean-Louis Collaudin
- Jose Duch
- Éric Durand
- Roland Gransart
- Franck Jurietti
- Philippe Montanier
- Casimir Nowotarski
- Vincent Stropoli
- Antoine Trivino
- Richard Trivino
- Nadir Belhadj
- Madjid Bougherra
- Nicolas Esceth-N'Zi
- Amara Traoré

== Honours ==
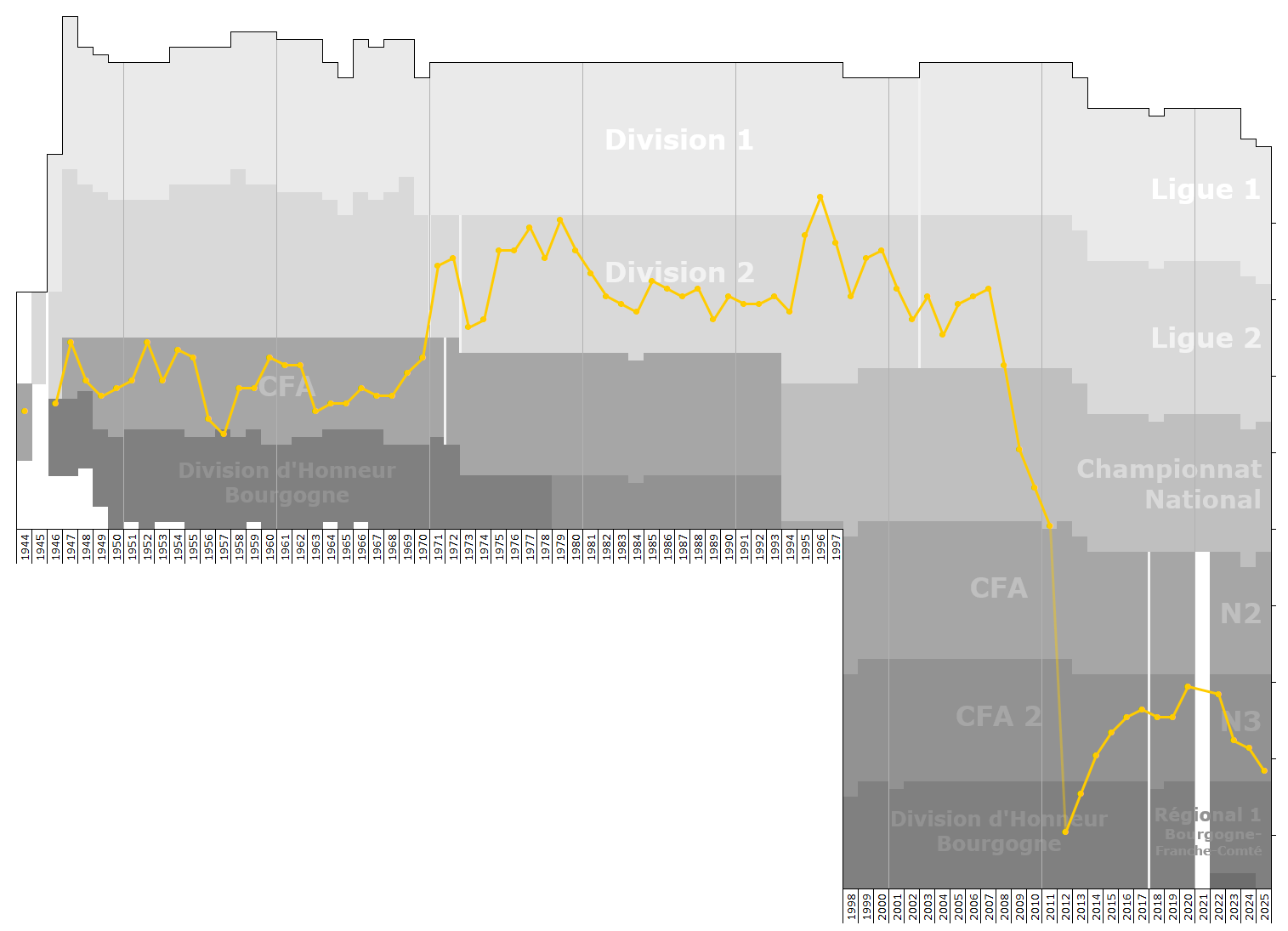
Historical league performance chart of FC Gueugnon

- Coupe de la Ligue
  - Champions: 1999–2000
- Ligue 2
  - Champions: 1978–79
- Championnat de France amateur
  - Champions: 1946–47, 1951–52
- Ligue de Bourgogne
  - Champions: 1945–46, 1946–47, 1947–48, 1956–57
- DH Bourgogne
  - Champions: 2012–13

== European record ==
Season	Competition	Round	Club	Home	Away	Aggregate
2000–01	UEFA Cup	1R	(Greece) Iraklis Thessaloniki	0–0	0–1	0–1

== Managers ==
=== Managerial history ===
- Emile Daniel (1967–74)
- Casimir Nowotarski (1974–86)
- Guy Briet (1986 – January 88)
- Georges Bernard (January 1988-88)
- Jean-Yves Chay (1988–90)
- Marcel Husson (1990–91)
- Roland Gransart (1991–98)
- Alex Dupont (1998-00)
- René Le Lamer (2000 – 1 February)
- Georges Bernard (February 2001-01)
- Noël Tosi (2001–02)
- Albert Cartier (2002 – 4 February)
- Georges Bernard (February 2004)
- Thierry Froger (February 2004–05)
- Victor Zvunka (2005–07)
- Alain Ravera (2007 – 7 October)
- Alex Dupont (2007–08)
- Hubert Fournier & René Le Lamer (2008 – 8 December)
- René Le Lamer (January 2009–10)
- Serge Romano (2010–2011)
- Philippe Correia (2012–present)
