= 2012–13 Ligue 1 =

75th season of top-tier French football

Ligue 1
- Season: 2012–13
- Dates: 10 August 2012 – 26 May 2013
- Champions: Paris Saint-Germain; 3rd Ligue 1 title 3rd French title
- Relegated: Nancy; Troyes; Brest
- Champions League: Paris Saint-Germain; Marseille; Lyon
- Europa League: Nice; Saint-Étienne; Bordeaux
- Matches: 380
- Goals: 967 (2.54 per match)
- Top goalscorer: Zlatan Ibrahimović (30 goals)
- Biggest home win: Valenciennes 6–1 Lorient (20 October 2012); Nice 5–0 Valenciennes (13 January 2013); Lille 5–0 Lorient (7 April 2013)
- Biggest away win: Bastia 0–4 Paris Saint-Germain (22 September 2012); Evian 0–4 Toulouse (20 October 2012); Lorient 0–4 Bordeaux (11 November 2012); Valenciennes 0–4 Paris Saint-Germain (11 November 2012); Toulouse 0–4 Paris Saint-Germain (1 February 2013); Bordeaux 0–4 Lyon (17 February 2013)
- Highest scoring: Lorient 4–4 Ajaccio (28 October 2012)
- Longest winning run: 6 games Marseille (10 August – 23 September)
- Longest unbeaten run: 16 games Saint-Étienne (21 September – 12 May)
- Longest winless run: 20 games Nancy (17 August – 26 January)
- Longest losing run: 11 games Brest (9 March – 26 May)
- Highest attendance: 47,828 – Lille 0–0 Marseille (14 April 2013)
- Lowest attendance: 0 (behind closed doors); Bastia 1–2 Marseille (12 December 2012)
- Average attendance: 19,262

The 2012–13 Ligue 1 was the 75th season since its establishment. Montpellier were the defending champions. The league schedule was announced in April 2012 and the fixtures were determined on 30 May. The season began on 10 August and ended on 26 May 2013. A winter break was in effect from 24 December to 12 January 2013.

The season marked the 80th anniversary of professional football in France. In addition, German sportswear company Adidas became the official provider of match balls for the season after agreeing to a long-term partnership with the Ligue de Football Professionnel. To commemorate the 80th anniversary, adidas unveiled an exclusive ball, known as Le 80, for the new season.

Since France dropped from fifth to sixth place in the UEFA association coefficient rankings at the end of the 2011–12 season, the league's third place team, Lyon qualified for the third qualifying round of the 2013–14 UEFA Champions League, having previously been placed in the playoff round.

On 12 May, Paris Saint-Germain won the league title after a 1–0 away win against Lyon.

== Teams ==
There were three promoted teams from Ligue 2, replacing the three teams that were relegated from Ligue 1 following the 2011–12 season. A total of 20 teams competed in the league with three clubs suffering relegation to the second division, Ligue 2. All clubs that secured Ligue 1 status for the season were subject to approval by the DNCG before becoming eligible to participate.

Bastia became the first club to achieve promotion to Ligue 1. The club clinched the second division title on 1 May 2012 with three matches to spare after defeating Metz 3–0 at the Stade Armand Cesari. Bastia is making its return to the first division after a seven-year absence and is entering Ligue 1 on a run of two consecutive promotions. The club had earned promotion to Ligue 2 after winning the 2010–11 edition of the Championnat National.

Reims and Troyes became the second and third clubs, respectively, to earn promotion to Ligue 1 alongside the champions Bastia. Both clubs achieved promotion with one game to spare following league victories on 11 May 2012, which positioned each club in second and third place permanently. Reims, which is a six-time Ligue 1 champion, is returning to the first division after over 33 years playing in the lower divisions. During those 33 years, the club underwent liquidation and had all aspects of the club (its records, trophies, etc.) auctioned off. Troyes is returning to Ligue 1 after spending four years playing in Ligue 2. During its five-year spell outside the first division, Troyes also played in the Championnat National, the third level of French football.

=== Stadia and locations ===
Location of teams in 2012–13 Ligue 1

Club	Location	Venue	Capacity	Av. Att.
Ajaccio	Ajaccio	Stade François Coty	10,660	7,060
Bastia	Bastia	Stade Armand Cesari	16,480	13,619
Bordeaux	Bordeaux	Stade Chaban-Delmas	34,462	19,683
Brest	Brest	Stade Francis-Le Blé	15,931	11,936
Évian	Annecy	Parc des Sports	15,660	9,697
Lille	Villeneuve-d'Ascq	Grand Stade Lille Métropole	50,186	40,326
Lorient	Lorient	Stade du Moustoir	18,890	14,784
Lyon	Lyon	Stade de Gerland	41,842	29,210
Marseille	Marseille	Stade Velodrome^{1}	42,000	34,083
Montpellier	Montpellier	Stade de la Mosson	32,939	18,141
Nancy	Tomblaine	Stade Marcel Picot	20,085	15,098
Nice	Nice	Stade du Ray	17,415	9,590
Paris Saint-Germain	Paris	Parc des Princes	48,712	42,289
Reims	Reims	Stade Auguste-Delaune II	21,684	14,696
Rennes	Rennes	Stade de la Route de Lorient	31,127	17,185
Saint-Étienne	Saint-Étienne	Stade Geoffroy-Guichard^{2}	26,747	22,554
Sochaux	Montbéliard	Stade Auguste Bonal	20,005	12,163
Toulouse	Toulouse	Stadium Municipal	35,470	18,140
Troyes	Troyes	Stade de l'Aube	21,877	12,833
Valenciennes	Valenciennes	Stade du Hainaut	24,926	15,513

- ^{1}The Stade Vélodrome is currently undergoing renovation in preparation for UEFA Euro 2016. The current capacity is 42,000, a decrease from the original capacity of 60,031. The capacity will be slightly extended in December 2012 following the completion of a new stand.
- ^{2}The Stade Geoffroy-Guichard is currently undergoing renovation in preparation for UEFA Euro 2016. The current capacity is 26,747, a decrease from the original capacity of 35,616. The capacity will be slightly extended in August 2012 following the completion of a new stand.

=== Personnel and kits ===
Note: Flags indicate national team as has been defined under FIFA eligibility rules. Players and managers may hold more than one non-FIFA nationality.

Team	Manager	Captain	Kit Manufacturer	Shirt sponsors (front)	Shirt sponsors (back)	Shirt sponsors (sleeve)	Shorts sponsors
Ajaccio	(France) Albert Emon	(France) Jean-Baptiste Pierazzi	Duarig	Restaurants du Cœur, Collectivité Territoriale de Corse, Conseil Général Corse du Sud	Europcar	Géant Casino	Corse-Matin
Bastia	(France) Frédéric Hantz	(France) Yannick Cahuzac	Kappa	Oscaro, Collectivité Territoriale de Corse, Odalys Vacances, Corsica Ferries	Vocalcom	Afflelou, Haute-Corse	Géant Casino, Kaporal 5 Jeans
Bordeaux	(France) Francis Gillot	(Czech Republic) Jaroslav Plašil	Puma	Kia	Groupama	None	None
Brest	(France) Corentin Martins	(Morocco) Ahmed Kantari	Nike	Quéguiner Matériaux (H)/Yaourt Malo (A & 3)/La Potagère (A & 3), Geodis Calberson, Breizh Cola	Casino Supermarchés	GUYOT Environnement	Centre Dépannage Gaz, Oceania Hotels
Evian	(France) Pascal Dupraz	(France) Cédric Barbosa	Kappa	Evian, Pilot, Danette, Geodis Calberson, Sword Group	Samsic	Agence de Voyages SAT	VEKA
Lille	(France) Rudi Garcia	(France) Rio Mavuba	Umbro	Partouche	Partouche	Nord-Pas-de-Calais	None
Lorient	(France) Christian Gourcuff	(Gabon) Bruno Ecuele Manga	Macron	La Trinitaine, Armor-Lux	Salaun Holidays	None	Lorient Agglomération
Lyon	(France) Rémi Garde	(Argentina) Lisandro López	Adidas	Hyundai/Veolia, MDA Electroménager, UNICEF	Groupama	Renault Trucks	Intermarché
Marseille	(France) Élie Baup	(France) Steve Mandanda	Adidas	Intersport	Groupama	OpusDry (H)/Technitoit (A)	Groupama
Montpellier	(France) René Girard	(France) Mapou Yanga-Mbiwa	Nike	Sud de France, Dyneff, Montpellier Agglomération, Partouche	La Région Languedoc-Roussillon	FAUN-Environnement	Système U, Wati B
Nancy	(France) Patrick Gabriel	(Brazil) André Luiz	Umbro	Groupe DLSI, Sopalin, Geodis Calberson, NetBet Sport	Comarch	Chaussea, Grand Nancy	Caisse d'Epargne
Nice	(France) Claude Puel	(France) Didier Digard	Burrda	Mutuelles du Soleil, Métropole Nice Côte d'Azur	Pizzorno Environnement	Rémanence Hygiène et Propreté	Ville de Nice
Paris Saint-Germain	(Italy) Carlo Ancelotti	(Brazil) Thiago Silva	Nike	Fly Emirates	None	Indesit	None
Reims	(France) Hubert Fournier	(France) Mickaël Tacalfred	Hummel	Transports Caillot/Epsilon Global/Sanei Ascenseurs, Geodis Calberson, Ace Crédit	TSO Logistique	Ville de Reims	Sanei Ascenseurs/Transports Caillot
Rennes	(France) Frédéric Antonetti	(France) Romain Danzé	Puma	Samsic, rennes.fr	Blot Immobilier	Association ELA	Breizh Cola
Saint-Étienne	(France) Christophe Galtier	(France) Loïc Perrin	Adidas	Winamax, Mister-Auto, Conseil général de la Loire en Rhône-Alpes	Triangle Intérim	Markal	Saint-Étienne Métropole, Loire, Rapid CroQ'
Sochaux	(France) Éric Hély	(France) David Sauget	Lotto	Mobil 1, Franche-Comté	Pays de Montbéliard Agglomération	Peugeot 208	Téréva
Toulouse	(France) Alain Casanova	(France) Jonathan Zebina	Kappa	JD Patrimoine, JD Promotion	Newrest	None	None
Troyes	(France) Jean-Marc Furlan	(Central African Republic) Eloge Enza Yamissi	Duarig	Afflelou, Colorpro Design (H)/Isolapro (A), Intermarché	Afflelou	Urbanéo (H)/Dugain Piscines (A)	Troyes, FSE Securite Grand Est
Valenciennes	(France) Daniel Sanchez	(France) Rudy Mater	Uhlsport	GDE Recyclage (H)/Prévoir Assurances (A), Toyota	Prévoir Assurances (H)/GDE Recyclage (A)	Nord-Pas-de-Calais	Konica Minolta

=== Managerial changes ===
Team	Outgoing head coach	Manner of departure	Date of vacancy	Position in table	Incoming head coach	Date of appointment	Position in table
Nice	(France) René Marsiglia	Sacked	21 May 2012	Off-season	(France) Claude Puel	24 May 2012	Off-season
Brest	(France) Corentin Martins	Mutual consent	31 May 2012	Off-season	(France) Landry Chauvin	31 May 2012	Off-season
Ajaccio	(France) Olivier Pantaloni	Resigned	14 June 2012	Off-season	(France) Alex Dupont	22 June 2012	Off-season
Marseille	(France) Didier Deschamps	Mutual consent	2 July 2012	Off-season	(France) Élie Baup	4 July 2012	Off-season
Evian	(Uruguay) Pablo Correa	Sacked	3 September 2012	18th	(France) Pascal Dupraz	3 September 2012	18th
Ajaccio	(France) Alex Dupont	Sacked	17 December 2012	14th	(France) Albert Emon	21 December 2012	14th
Nancy	(France) Jean Fernandez	Resigned	10 January 2013	20th	(France) Patrick Gabriel	11 January 2013	20th
Brest	(France) Landry Chauvin	Sacked	2 April 2013	18th	(France) Corentin Martins	4 April 2013	18th

== League table ==
Pos	Team	Pld	W	D	L	GF	GA	GD	Pts	Qualification or relegation
1	Paris Saint-Germain (C)	38	25	8	5	69	23	+46	83	Qualification for the Champions League group stage
2	Marseille	38	21	8	9	42	36	+6	71	Qualification for the Champions League group stage
3	Lyon	38	19	10	9	61	38	+23	67	Qualification for the Champions League third qualifying round
4	Nice	38	18	10	10	57	46	+11	64	Qualification for the Europa League play-off round
5	Saint-Étienne	38	16	15	7	60	32	+28	63	Qualification for the Europa League third qualifying round (Note: Saint-Étienne, as winner of the 2012–13 Coupe de la Ligue, qualifies for the third qualifying round of 2013–14 UEFA Europa League.)
6	Lille	38	16	14	8	59	40	+19	62	
7	Bordeaux	38	13	16	9	40	34	+6	55	Qualification for the Europa League group stage (Note: Bordeaux, winner of the 2012–13 Coupe de France, qualified for the Group stage of 2013–14 UEFA Europa League.)
8	Lorient	38	14	11	13	57	58	−1	53	
9	Montpellier	38	15	7	16	54	51	+3	52	
10	Toulouse	38	13	12	13	49	47	+2	51	
11	Valenciennes	38	12	12	14	49	53	−4	48	
12	Bastia	38	13	8	17	50	66	−16	47	
13	Rennes	38	13	7	18	48	59	−11	46	
14	Reims	38	10	13	15	33	42	−9	43	
15	Sochaux	38	10	11	17	41	57	−16	41	
16	Evian	38	10	10	18	46	53	−7	40	
17	Ajaccio	38	9	15	14	39	51	−12	40 (Note: On 9 August 2012, Ajaccio was docked two points, one suspended, by the Disciplinary Committee of the Ligue de Football Professionnel for the 2012–13 season because of incidents during a 2011–12 league match against Lyon.)	
18	Nancy (R)	38	9	11	18	38	58	−20	38	Relegation to Ligue 2
19	Troyes (R)	38	8	13	17	43	61	−18	37	Relegation to Ligue 2
20	Brest (R)	38	8	5	25	32	62	−30	29	Relegation to Ligue 2

Source: Ligue 1
Rules for classification: 1) points; 2) goal difference; 3) number of goals scored.
(C) Champions; (R) Relegated

== Results ==
Home \ Away	ACA	BAS	BOR	BRS	EVI	LIL	LOR	OL	OM	MHS	NAL	NIC	PSG	REI	REN	STE	SOC	TFC	TRO	VAL
Ajaccio		0–0	1–0	1–0	2–0	1–3	1–0	3–1	0–2	2–1	1–1	0–2	0–0	2–0	2–4	0–0	0–1	2–3	0–1	1–1
Bastia	1–0		3–1	4–0	0–0	1–2	2–1	4–1	1–2	3–1	4–2	0–1	0–4	2–1	0–2	0–3	0–0	0–0	3–2	2–3
Bordeaux	2–2	1–0		0–2	2–1	1–1	1–1	0–4	1–0	4–2	3–2	1–1	0–1	0–0	1–0	0–0	2–2	1–0	0–0	2–0
Brest	1–1	3–0	1–1		1–0	1–2	2–0	1–1	1–2	1–2	1–2	0–2	0–3	0–2	0–2	0–1	0–2	0–1	2–1	2–1
Evian	1–1	3–0	2–3	0–2		0–2	1–1	1–1	1–1	0–1	1–1	4–0	0–1	2–2	4–2	2–2	5–1	0–4	2–0	2–0
Lille	2–0	0–0	2–1	1–0	1–2		5–0	1–1	0–0	4–1	1–1	0–2	1–2	3–0	2–0	1–1	3–3	2–0	1–1	2–1
Lorient	4–4	4–1	0–4	4–0	2–1	2–0		1–1	0–1	2–1	3–0	1–1	1–3	2–2	2–2	3–1	2–0	1–0	3–2	1–1
Lyon	2–0	5–2	0–2	1–0	0–0	1–3	3–1		0–0	1–0	1–1	3–0	0–1	3–0	2–0	1–1	1–2	3–1	4–1	3–2
Marseille	0–0	2–1	1–0	1–0	1–0	1–0	0–3	1–4		3–2	0–1	2–2	2–2	0–0	3–1	1–0	2–0	2–1	2–1	1–0
Montpellier	3–0	4–0	1–0	2–1	2–3	0–0	2–0	1–2	0–1		1–0	3–1	1–1	3–1	2–0	1–1	2–0	1–1	1–1	3–1
Nancy	1–1	1–2	1–1	1–0	3–1	2–2	2–1	0–3	0–1	0–2		1–0	0–1	1–2	1–3	0–3	1–1	0–1	1–0	1–1
Nice	0–1	2–2	0–1	4–2	3–2	2–2	1–1	1–1	0–1	2–0	2–1		2–1	2–0	1–0	1–1	3–0	1–0	3–1	5–0
Paris SG	0–0	3–1	0–0	3–1	4–0	1–0	2–2	1–0	2–0	1–0	2–1	3–0		1–0	1–2	1–2	2–0	2–0	4–0	1–1
Reims	1–1	1–2	0–0	0–0	1–2	1–1	1–0	1–0	0–1	3–1	2–0	3–1	1–0		1–0	1–1	1–0	1–1	1–1	0–1
Rennes	1–1	3–2	0–2	2–2	0–1	2–0	1–2	0–1	2–2	2–1	0–2	0–3	0–2	1–0		2–2	2–2	2–0	1–2	2–0
Saint-Étienne	4–2	3–0	0–0	4–0	1–0	1–2	0–2	0–1	2–0	4–1	4–0	4–0	2–2	0–0	2–0		0–1	2–2	2–0	1–0
Sochaux	0–0	2–3	2–2	1–2	2–1	1–1	1–0	1–1	3–1	1–3	1–2	0–1	3–2	1–0	0–1	1–2		1–2	3–1	1–1
Toulouse	2–4	0–0	0–0	3–1	0–0	4–2	0–1	3–0	0–1	2–0	2–1	3–4	0–4	1–1	2–2	2–1	2–0		2–2	2–2
Troyes	3–2	0–0	1–0	2–1	1–0	1–1	2–2	1–2	1–0	1–1	3–3	1–1	0–1	4–2	2–3	2–2	0–0	0–2		0–1
Valenciennes	3–0	3–4	0–0	2–1	2–1	1–3	6–1	0–2	4–1	1–1	0–0	0–0	0–4	1–0	4–1	0–0	3–1	0–0	2–1	

Source: Ligue 1
Legend: Blue = home team win; Yellow = draw; Red = away team win.

== Season statistics ==
=== Top goalscorers ===
Rank	Player	Club	Goals
1	(Sweden) Zlatan Ibrahimović	Paris Saint-Germain	30
2	(Gabon) Pierre-Emerick Aubameyang	Saint-Étienne	19
2	(Argentina) Darío Cvitanich	Nice	19
4	(France) Bafétimbi Gomis	Lyon	16
5	(France) Wissam Ben Yedder	Toulouse	15
5	(France) Jérémie Aliadière	Lorient	15
5	(France) Anthony Modeste	Bastia	15
8	(Ivory Coast) Salomon Kalou	Lille	14
9	(France) André-Pierre Gignac	Marseille	13
9	(Tunisia) Saber Khalifa	Evian	13

Source: Official Goalscorers' Standings

=== Hat-tricks ===
Player	For	Against	Result	Date
(Tunisia) Saber Khalifa	Evian	Montpellier	2–3 Archived 9 October 2012 at the Wayback Machine	6 October 2012
(France) Bafétimbi Gomis	Lyon	Marseille	1–4 Archived 9 July 2018 at the Wayback Machine	28 November 2012
(Sweden) Zlatan Ibrahimović	Paris SG	Valenciennes	0–4 Archived 9 July 2018 at the Wayback Machine	11 December 2012

=== Scoring ===
- First goal of the season: Souleymane Camara for Montpellier against Toulouse (10 August 2012)
- Fastest goal of the season: 27 seconds – Zlatan Ibrahimović for Paris Saint-Germain against Lille (2 September 2012)
- Latest goal of the season: 90+5 minutes – Ilan for Bastia against Reims (18 August 2012)
- Largest winning margin: 5 goals
  - Valenciennes 6–1 Lorient (20 October 2012)
  - Nice 5–0 Valenciennes (13 January 2013)
  - Lille 5–0 Lorient (7 April 2013)
- Highest scoring game: 8 goals
  - Lorient 4–4 Ajaccio (28 October 2012)
- Most goals scored in a match by a single team: 6 goals
  - Valenciennes 6–1 Lorient (20 October 2012)
- Most goals scored in a match by a losing team: 3 goals
  - Valenciennes 3–4 Bastia (30 March 2013)
  - Toulouse 3–4 Nice (6 April 2013)

=== Clean sheets ===
- Most clean sheets: 23
  - Paris Saint-Germain
- Fewest clean sheets: 6
  - Brest
  - Nancy

=== Discipline ===
- Most yellow cards (club): 83
  - Bastia
- Most yellow cards (player): 14
  - Sambou Yatabaré (Bastia)
- Most red cards (club): 10
  - Paris Saint-Germain
  - Rennes
- Most red cards (player): 2
  - Younès Belhanda (Montpellier)
  - Cheikh M'Bengue (Toulouse)
  - Jamel Saihi (Montpellier)
  - Florian Thauvin (Bastia)

== Awards ==
Award	Winner	Club
Player of the Season	(Sweden) Zlatan Ibrahimović	Paris Saint-Germain
Young Player of the Season	(France) Florian Thauvin	Bastia
Goalkeeper of the Season	(Italy) Salvatore Sirigu	Paris Saint-Germain
Goal of the Season	(Tunisia) Saber Khalifa	Evian
Manager of the Season	(France) Christophe Galtier	Saint-Étienne
Manager of the Season	(Italy) Carlo Ancelotti	Paris Saint-Germain

Team of the Year
Goalkeeper	(Italy) Salvatore Sirigu (Paris Saint-Germain)			
Defence	(France) Christophe Jallet (Paris Saint-Germain)	(Brazil) Thiago Silva (Paris Saint-Germain)	(Cameroon) Nicolas Nkoulou (Marseille)	(Brazil) Maxwell (Paris Saint-Germain)
Midfield	(France) Dimitri Payet (Lille)	(Italy) Marco Verratti (Paris Saint-Germain)	(France) Blaise Matuidi (Paris Saint-Germain)	(France) Mathieu Valbuena (Marseille)
Attack	(Sweden) Zlatan Ibrahimović (Paris Saint-Germain)		(Gabon) Pierre-Emerick Aubameyang (Saint-Étienne)	
