= 2011–12 Ligue 1 =

74th season of top-tier French football

Ligue 1
- Season: 2011–12
- Dates: 6 August 2011 – 20 May 2012
- Champions: Montpellier; 1st Ligue 1 title 1st French title
- Relegated: Caen; Dijon; Auxerre
- Champions League: Montpellier; Paris Saint-Germain; Lille
- Europa League: Lyon; Bordeaux; Marseille
- Matches: 380
- Goals: 956 (2.52 per match)
- Top goalscorer: Olivier Giroud; Nenê (21 goals each)
- Biggest home win: Paris Saint-Germain 6–1 Sochaux (22 April 2012)
- Biggest away win: Dijon 1–5 Rennes (7 August 2011); Sochaux 2–6 Rennes (21 September 2011)
- Highest scoring: Lille 4–5 Bordeaux (12 February 2012)
- Longest winning run: 6 games Paris Saint-Germain (21 September – 29 October); Bordeaux (21 April - 20 May)
- Longest unbeaten run: 17 games Lille (20 August – 21 December)
- Longest winless run: 13 games Sochaux (20 November – 3 March); Marseille (5 February - 27 April)
- Longest losing run: 5 games Marseille (26 February – 17 March); Dijon (7 April - 3 May)
- Highest attendance: 46,252 – Paris Saint-Germain 2–1 Marseille (8 April 2012)
- Lowest attendance: 5,125 – Ajaccio 2–2 Caen (10 September 2011)
- Average attendance: 18,554

The 2011–12 Ligue 1 season was the 74th since its establishment. Lille were the defending champions. The league schedule was announced on 31 March 2011 and the fixtures were determined on 10 June. The season began on 6 August 2011 and ended on 20 May 2012. The winter break was in effect from 22 December 2011 to 14 January 2012.

On 20 May 2012, the final day of the league season, Montpellier clinched its first-ever league title after defeating Auxerre 2–1 at the Stade de l'Abbé-Deschamps. Montpellier was the fifth different club to win Ligue 1 since the 2007–08 season and qualified for the UEFA Champions League for the first time in its history. Paris Saint-Germain and Lille were the country's other Champions League participants, while Lyon, Bordeaux, and Marseille represented France in the UEFA Europa League. Lyon did not participate in UEFA's top football club competition for the first time in 12 years.

Auxerre, Dijon, and Caen were relegated to Ligue 2. Auxerre returned to the second division after 32 consecutive years playing in Ligue 1. Prior to the 2011–12 season, the club had never suffered relegation from the country's top division. Dijon returned to the second division after only one season in Ligue 1, while Caen fell to the second tier after two years in the first division.

== Teams ==
There were three promoted teams from Ligue 2, replacing the three teams that were relegated from Ligue 1 following the 2010–11 season. A total of 20 teams competed in the league with three clubs suffering relegation to the second division, Ligue 2. All clubs that secured Ligue 1 status for the season were subject to approval by the DNCG before becoming eligible to participate.

Arles-Avignon was the first club to suffer relegation from the first division to Ligue 2. The club's impending drop occurred on 17 April 2011 following the team's 2–0 defeat to AS Monaco. The negative result made it mathematically impossible for Arles to seize the 17th position in the table, which would have allowed the club to remain in Ligue 1. Arles-Avignon made its return to Ligue 2 after only a year's spell in the top division of French football. On 15 May, Lens were relegated from the first division to Ligue 2 after its 1–1 draw with Monaco. Lens returned to Ligue 2 for the first time since the 2008–09 season when the club finished as champions of the league. On the final day of the Ligue 1 season, Monaco suffered relegation to the second division after losing 2–0 to Lyon. The club's appearance in Ligue 2 was its first since 1976.

Evian became the first club from Ligue 2 to achieve promotion to Ligue 1 after its 2–1 victory over Reims on 20 May 2011. Evian made its debut in the first division and, similar to Arles-Avignon the previous season, the club's ascension to the first division is notable due in part to the fact that it has achieved successive promotions in four straight seasons. On the final day of the Ligue 2 season, both Dijon and Ajaccio earned berths in the first division after posting positive results in their respective matches. Dijon was promoted despite losing on the match day and, similar to Évian, made its debut in the top division of French football. Ajaccio returned to Ligue 1 after five seasons in the second division.

=== Stadia and locations ===
Location of teams in 2011–12 Ligue 1

Club	Location	Venue	Capacity	Average attendance
Ajaccio	Ajaccio	Stade François Coty	10,660	6,338
Auxerre	Auxerre	Stade de l'Abbé-Deschamps	24,493	11,879
Bordeaux	Bordeaux	Stade Chaban-Delmas	34,462	20,712
Brest	Brest	Stade Francis-Le Blé	16,000	13,542
Caen	Caen	Stade Michel d'Ornano	21,500	15,280
Dijon	Dijon	Stade Gaston Gérard	15,998	13,597
Evian	Annecy	Parc des Sports	15,600	11,855
Lille	Villeneuve-d'Ascq	Stadium Nord Lille Métropole	18,185	16,969
Lorient	Lorient	Stade du Moustoir	18,890	15,594
Lyon	Lyon	Stade de Gerland	41,842	33,108
Marseille	Marseille	Stade Vélodrome^{1}	42,000	40,455
Montpellier	Montpellier	Stade de la Mosson	32,900	17,492
Nancy	Tomblaine	Stade Marcel Picot	20,085	15,328
Nice	Nice	Stade du Ray	17,415	9,133
Paris Saint-Germain	Paris	Parc des Princes	48,712	42,892
Rennes	Rennes	Stade de la Route de Lorient	31,127	20,725
Saint-Étienne	Saint-Étienne	Stade Geoffroy-Guichard^{2}	26,747	21,409
Sochaux	Montbéliard	Stade Auguste Bonal	20,005	13,826
Toulouse	Toulouse	Stadium Municipal	35,470	22,033
Valenciennes	Valenciennes	Stade du Hainaut	25,000	15,226

- ^{1}The Stade Vélodrome is currently undergoing renovations in preparation for UEFA Euro 2016. The current capacity is 42,000, a decrease from the original capacity of 60,031.
- ^{2}The Stade Geoffroy-Guichard is currently undergoing renovations in preparation for UEFA Euro 2016. The current capacity is 26,747, a decrease from the original capacity of 35,616.

=== Personnel and kits ===
Note: Flags indicate national team as has been defined under FIFA eligibility rules. Players and managers may hold more than one non-FIFA nationality.

Team	Manager	Captain	Kit Manufacturer	Shirt sponsors (front)	Shirt sponsors (back)	Shirt sponsors (sleeve)	Shorts sponsors
Ajaccio	(France) Olivier Pantaloni	(France) Jean-Baptiste Pierazzi	Duarig	Restaurants du Cœur, Collectivité Territoriale de Corse, Conseil Général Corse du Sud	Europcar	Géant Casino	Mocchi Travaux Publics
Auxerre	(France) Jean-Guy Wallemme	(France) Olivier Sorin	Airness	Maisons Pierre, Conseil général de l'Yonne	Groupama	Conseil général de l'Yonne	Besson Chaussures
Bordeaux	(France) Francis Gillot	(Czech Republic) Jaroslav Plašil	Puma	Kia	Groupama	Pichet Immobilier	Cdiscount
Brest	(France) Corentin Martins (interim)	(Republic of the Congo) Oscar Ewolo	Nike	Quéguiner Matériaux (H)/Yaourt Malo (A & 3)/La Potagère (A & 3), Geodis Calberson, Breizh Cola	Casino Supermarchés	GUYOT Environnement	IDP
Caen	(France) Franck Dumas	(France) Nicolas Seube	Nike	GDE Recyclage (H)/Campagne de France (A & 3), Thebault Ingenierie (H)/GDE Recyclage (A & 3)	Petit Forestier	None	None
Dijon	(France) Patrice Carteron	(Ivory Coast) Abdoulaye Méïté	Nike	Doras Matériaux (H)/INEO (A), Veolia Propreté (H)/Pentax (A), Dijonnaise de Voies Ferrées	Pentax (H)/Veolia Propreté (A)	Leader Intérim	Incendie Protection Sécurité
Evian	(Uruguay) Pablo Correa	(France) Cédric Barbosa	Kappa	Evian, Danette, Geodis Calberson, Sword Group	Samsic	Agence de Voyages SAT	VEKA
Lille	(France) Rudi Garcia	(France) Rio Mavuba	Umbro	Partouche	Partouche	Nord-Pas-de-Calais	None
Lorient	(France) Christian Gourcuff	(France) Fabien Audard	Macron	La Trinitaine, Armor-Lux, B&B Hotels	Salaun Holidays	None	Cap l'Orient Agglomération
Lyon	(France) Rémi Garde	(Brazil) Cris	Adidas	Everest Poker/Veolia Environnement (H in UEFA matches)/Renault Trucks (A in UEFA matches), MDA Electroménager (H)/LG (A)	Groupama	Renault Trucks/Veolia Environnement	Renault Trucks/Keolis
Marseille	(France) Didier Deschamps	(France) Steve Mandanda	Adidas	Betclic	Intersport	None	Groupama
Montpellier	(France) René Girard	(France) Mapou Yanga-Mbiwa	Nike	Sud de France, Dyneff, Montpellier Agglomération	La Région Languedoc-Roussillon	Renault Trucks	Système U
Nancy	(France) Jean Fernandez	(Brazil) André Luiz	Umbro	Triangle Intérim/Groupe DLSI, Geodis Calberson, Sopalin, Grand Nancy	FMT Divoux/Crea Flock/Factum/Fort Aventure/Comarch	Sopalin/Mougdon Menuisier/As2Foot	Caisse d'Epargne
Nice	(France) René Marsiglia	(France) Didier Digard	Burrda	Mutuelles du Soleil, Métropole Nice Côte d'Azur	Pizzorno Environnement	None	Métropole Nice Côte d'Azur
Paris Saint-Germain	(Italy) Carlo Ancelotti	(France) Mamadou Sakho	Nike	Fly Emirates	Winamax Poker	Indesit	Elior Group
Rennes	(France) Frédéric Antonetti	(Senegal) Kader Mangane	Puma	Samsic, rennes.fr	Blot Immobilier	Association ELA	Breizh Cola
Saint-Étienne	(France) Christophe Galtier	(France) Loïc Perrin	Adidas	Winamax, Mister-Auto, Conseil général de la Loire en Rhône-Alpes	Funai	None	Saint-Étienne Métropole, Loire
Sochaux	(France) Éric Hély	(France) Teddy Richert	Lotto	Mobil 1, Franche-Comté	Pays de Montbéliard Agglomération	Peugeot Occasions Du Lion	None
Toulouse	(France) Alain Casanova	(France) Daniel Congré	Kappa	Groupe IDEC, JD Patrimoine, JD Promotion	Newrest	None	None
Valenciennes	(France) Daniel Sanchez	(France) Rudy Mater	Uhlsport	Toyota (H)/SITA (A), Partouche	SITA (H)	Nord-Pas-de-Calais	Konica Minolta

=== Managerial changes ===
Team	Outgoing head coach	Manner of departure	Date of vacancy	Position in table	Incoming head coach	Date of appointment	Position in table
Auxerre	(France) Jean Fernandez	End of contract	2 June 2011	Off-season	(France) Laurent Fournier	8 June 2011	Off-season
Valenciennes	(France) Philippe Montanier	Joined Real Sociedad	4 June 2011	Off-season	(France) Daniel Sanchez	8 June 2011	Off-season
Nancy	(Uruguay) Pablo Correa	Resigned	5 June 2011	Off-season	(France) Jean Fernandez	5 June 2011	Off-season
Sochaux	(France) Francis Gillot	Resigned	5 June 2011	Off-season	(Bosnia and Herzegovina) Mehmed Baždarević	10 June 2011	Off-season
Bordeaux	(France) Éric Bédouet	Mutual consent	6 June 2011	Off-season	(France) Francis Gillot	6 June 2011	Off-season
Lyon	(France) Claude Puel	Sacked	20 June 2011	Off-season	(France) Rémi Garde	21 June 2011	Off-season
Nice	(France) Eric Roy	Sacked	15 November 2011	17th	(France) René Marsiglia	15 November 2011	17th
Paris Saint-Germain	(France) Antoine Kombouaré	Mutual consent	30 December 2011	1st	(Italy) Carlo Ancelotti	30 December 2011	1st
Evian	(France) Bernard Casoni	Sacked	1 January 2012	11th	(Uruguay) Pablo Correa	2 January 2012	11th
Sochaux	(Bosnia and Herzegovina) Mehmed Baždarević	Sacked	6 March 2012	20th	(France) Éric Hély	6 March 2012	20th
Auxerre	(France) Laurent Fournier	Sacked	18 March 2012	20th	(France) Jean-Guy Wallemme	18 March 2012	20th
Brest	(France) Alex Dupont	Sacked	26 April 2012	18th	(France) Corentin Martins	26 April 2012	18th

=== Ownership changes ===
Club	New owner	Previous owner	Date
Paris Saint-Germain	Qatar Investment Authority	(United States) Colony Capital and (France) Butler Capital Partners	1 July 2011

== League table ==
Pos	Team	Pld	W	D	L	GF	GA	GD	Pts	Qualification or relegation
1	Montpellier (C)	38	25	7	6	68	34	+34	82	Qualification to Champions League group stage
2	Paris Saint-Germain	38	23	10	5	75	41	+34	79	Qualification to Champions League group stage
3	Lille	38	21	11	6	72	39	+33	74	Qualification to Champions League play-off round
4	Lyon	38	19	7	12	64	51	+13	64	Qualification to Europa League group stage (Note: Lyon won the 2011–12 Coupe de France and thus qualified for the group stage of the 2012–13 UEFA Europa League. Since they finished 4th, the spot for the Europa League play-off round goes to the fifth-placed team.)
5	Bordeaux	38	16	13	9	53	41	+12	61	Qualification to Europa League play-off round
6	Rennes	38	17	9	12	53	44	+9	60	
7	Saint-Étienne	38	16	9	13	49	45	+4	57	
8	Toulouse	38	15	11	12	37	34	+3	56	
9	Evian	38	13	11	14	54	55	−1	50	
10	Marseille	38	12	12	14	45	41	+4	48	Qualification to Europa League third qualifying round (Note: Marseille, as winners of the 2011–12 Coupe de la Ligue, qualified for the third qualifying round of 2012–13 UEFA Europa League.)
11	Nancy	38	11	12	15	38	48	−10	45	
12	Valenciennes	38	12	7	19	40	50	−10	43	
13	Nice	38	10	12	16	39	46	−7	42	
14	Sochaux	38	11	9	18	40	60	−20	42	
15	Brest	38	8	17	13	31	38	−7	41	
16	Ajaccio	38	9	14	15	40	61	−21	41	
17	Lorient	38	9	12	17	35	49	−14	39	
18	Caen (R)	38	9	11	18	39	59	−20	38	Relegation to Ligue 2
19	Dijon (R)	38	9	9	20	38	63	−25	36	Relegation to Ligue 2
20	Auxerre (R)	38	7	13	18	46	57	−11	34	Relegation to Ligue 2

Source: Ligue 1
Rules for classification: 1) points; 2) goal difference; 3) number of goals scored.
(C) Champions; (R) Relegated

== Results ==
Home \ Away	ACA	AUX	BOR	BRS	CAE	DIJ	EVI	LIL	LOR	OL	OM	MHS	NAL	NIC	PSG	REN	STE	SOC	TFC	VAL
Ajaccio		2–1	0–2	0–0	2–2	2–1	1–1	2–3	1–1	1–1	1–0	1–3	0–0	1–1	1–3	1–0	1–1	2–1	0–2	3–1
Auxerre	4–1		2–4	4–0	1–1	2–2	0–2	1–3	1–1	0–3	2–2	1–2	1–3	2–1	1–1	0–1	0–0	4–1	2–0	2–0
Bordeaux	1–1	1–1		1–1	2–0	1–1	0–0	1–1	1–0	1–0	2–1	2–2	2–0	1–2	1–1	2–0	1–2	1–0	2–0	2–1
Brest	1–1	1–0	0–2		1–1	1–1	2–2	3–1	3–1	1–1	1–0	2–2	0–1	1–0	0–1	0–1	2–2	2–0	0–0	1–0
Caen	0–0	2–1	1–0	0–0		3–0	2–2	1–2	1–0	1–0	1–2	1–3	1–2	1–1	2–2	0–2	1–4	1–3	0–1	1–0
Dijon	1–1	0–2	2–0	1–0	2–0		3–1	0–2	2–0	1–2	2–3	1–1	0–2	3–0	1–2	1–5	1–2	0–0	1–1	1–2
Evian	2–1	3–1	0–0	0–1	2–4	0–1		0–3	2–1	1–3	2–0	4–2	2–0	1–0	2–2	1–3	1–2	2–3	2–1	2–1
Lille	4–1	2–2	4–5	2–0	3–0	2–0	1–1		1–1	3–1	3–2	0–1	4–1	4–4	2–1	2–0	3–0	2–2	2–1	4–0
Lorient	2–0	1–1	1–1	2–1	0–0	0–0	0–1	0–1		0–1	2–1	2–1	2–1	1–0	1–2	0–2	3–0	1–1	0–0	2–0
Lyon	1–1	2–1	3–1	1–1	1–2	3–1	2–1	2–1	3–2		2–0	2–1	3–1	3–4	4–4	1–2	2–0	2–1	3–2	4–1
Marseille	2–0	3–0	0–0	1–1	1–1	1–2	2–0	2–0	2–1	2–2		1–3	1–0	2–0	3–0	0–1	0–0	2–2	0–1	1–1
Montpellier	3–0	3–1	1–0	1–0	3–0	5–3	2–2	1–0	4–0	1–0	1–0		2–0	1–0	0–3	4–0	1–0	2–1	1–1	1–0
Nancy	2–2	0–0	2–2	2–1	1–1	1–2	1–1	1–1	2–2	2–0	1–3	1–0		1–0	2–1	0–0	3–2	1–2	0–3	1–1
Nice	3–0	1–0	3–0	0–0	1–0	1–1	1–1	0–1	2–0	1–3	1–1	0–1	1–1		0–0	2–0	0–2	1–1	1–1	2–0
Paris SG	4–1	3–2	1–1	1–0	4–2	2–0	3–1	0–0	0–1	2–0	2–1	2–2	0–1	2–1		3–0	2–0	6–1	3–1	2–1
Rennes	3–1	1–1	1–0	1–1	3–2	5–0	3–2	1–1	2–0	1–1	1–2	0–2	1–1	3–1	1–1		1–1	1–0	0–1	1–1
Saint-Étienne	3–1	1–1	2–3	2–1	2–0	1–0	0–2	1–3	4–2	0–1	0–0	1–1	1–0	2–3	0–1	4–0		1–0	1–1	1–0
Sochaux	0–2	0–0	0–3	2–1	1–2	1–0	1–1	0–1	1–1	2–1	1–0	1–3	1–0	2–0	0–1	2–6	2–1		3–0	1–1
Toulouse	0–2	1–0	3–2	0–0	1–0	2–0	2–1	0–0	1–1	3–0	0–0	0–1	1–0	0–0	1–3	1–0	0–1	2–0		2–0
Valenciennes	1–2	2–1	1–2	0–0	3–1	4–0	0–3	0–0	2–0	1–0	1–1	1–0	1–0	2–0	3–4	1–0	1–2	3–0	2–0	

Source: Ligue 1
Legend: Blue = home team win; Yellow = draw; Red = away team win.

== Statistics ==
=== Top goalscorers ===
Rank	Player	Club	Goals
1	(France) Olivier Giroud	Montpellier	21
1	(Brazil) Nenê	Paris Saint-Germain	21
3	(Belgium) Eden Hazard	Lille	20
4	(Gabon) Pierre-Emerick Aubameyang	Saint-Étienne	16
4	(Argentina) Lisandro López	Lyon	16
6	(France) Bafétimbi Gomis	Lyon	14
6	(France) Yoan Gouffran	Bordeaux	14
8	(Argentina) Javier Pastore	Paris Saint-Germain	13
9	(France) Loïc Rémy	Marseille	12
9	(Morocco) Younès Belhanda	Montpellier	12

Last updated: 20 May 2012
Source: Official Goalscorers' Standings

=== Hat-tricks ===
Player	For	Against	Result	Date
(Kenya) Dennis Oliech	Auxerre	Sochaux	4–1	25 September 2011
(France) Olivier Giroud	Montpellier	Dijon	5–3	15 October 2011
(France) Kevin Gameiro	Paris Saint-Germain	Ajaccio	1–3	16 October 2011
(France) Olivier Giroud	Montpellier	Sochaux	1–3	26 November 2011
(Gabon) Pierre-Emerick Aubameyang	Saint-Étienne	Lorient	4–2	22 February 2012
(Brazil) Nenê	Paris Saint-Germain	Rennes	3–0	13 May 2012
(Belgium) Eden Hazard	Lille	Nancy	4–1	20 May 2012

=== Scoring ===
- First goal of the season: Anthony Mounier for Nice against Lyon (6 August 2011)
- Fastest goal of the season: 18 seconds – Jaroslav Plašil for Bordeaux against Nancy (4 December 2011)
- Latest goal of the season: 90+4 minutes – François Clerc for Nice against Lille (21 December 2011)
- First own goal of the season: Abdoulaye Bamba (Dijon) for Lyon (10 September 2011)
- Widest winning margin: 5 goals
  - Paris Saint-Germain 6–1 Sochaux (22 April 2012)
- Highest scoring game: 9 goals
  - Lille 4–5 Bordeaux
- Most goals scored in a match by a single team: 6 goals
  - Sochaux 2–6 Rennes (21 September 2011)
  - Paris Saint-Germain 6–1 Sochaux (22 April 2012)

=== Discipline ===
- Worst overall disciplinary record (1 pt per yellow card, 3 pts per red card): 119 points
  - Ajaccio (92 yellow & 9 red cards)
- Best overall disciplinary record: 66 points
  - Sochaux (60 yellow & 2 red cards)
- Most yellow cards (club): 92
  - Ajaccio
- Most yellow cards (player): 13
  - Mehdi Mostefa (Ajaccio)
- Most red cards (club): 9
  - Ajaccio
- Most red cards (player): 3
  - Jean-Pascal Mignot (Saint-Étienne)

== Awards ==
=== Monthly awards ===
Month	Player of the Month	
Month	Player	Club
September	(Argentina) Javier Pastore	Paris Saint-Germain
October	(Brazil) Nenê	Paris Saint-Germain
November	(Morocco) Younès Belhanda	Montpellier
December	(Italy) Salvatore Sirigu	Paris Saint-Germain
January	(Serbia) Milan Biševac	Paris Saint-Germain
February	(Gabon) P. E. Aubameyang	Saint-Étienne
March	(Belgium) Eden Hazard	Lille

=== Annual awards ===
==== UNFP Ligue 1 Player of the Year ====
The UNFP Ligue 1 Player of the Year was awarded to Eden Hazard.

==== UNFP Young Player of the Year ====
The UNFP Young Player of the Year was awarded to Younès Belhanda.

==== UNFP Ligue 1 Goalkeeper of the Year ====
The UNFP Goalkeeper of the Year was awarded to Hugo Lloris.

=== UNFP Team of the Year ===

UNFP Ligue 1 Team of the Year

Team of the Year
Goalkeeper	(France) Hugo Lloris (Lyon)			
Defenders	(France) Mathieu Debuchy (Lille)	(Brazil) Vitorino Hilton (Montpellier)	(Cameroon) Nicolas Nkoulou (Marseille)	(Cameroon) Henri Bedimo (Montpellier)
Midfielders	(France) Rio Mavuba (Lille)	(France) Étienne Capoue (Toulouse)	(Morocco) Younès Belhanda (Montpellier)	(Belgium) Eden Hazard (Lille)
Forwards	(France) Olivier Giroud (Montpellier)	(Brazil) Nenê (Paris Saint-Germain)		

==== UNFP Ligue 1 Manager of the Year ====
The UNFP Manager of the Year was awarded to René Girard of Montpellier.
