= 2013–14 in French football =

Football in France
- Season: 2013–14

Men's football
- Ligue 1: Paris Saint-Germain
- Ligue 2: Metz
- Championnat National: Orléans
- Coupe de France: Guingamp
- Coupe de la Ligue: Paris Saint-Germain
- Trophée des Champions: Paris Saint-Germain

Women's football
- Division 1: Lyon
- Coupe de France: Lyon

The 2013–14 season was the 109th overall season of football and the 80th season of competitive professional football in France.

== Managerial changes ==
=== Ligue 1 ===
Team	Outgoing head coach	Manner of departure	Date of vacancy	Position in table	Incoming head coach	Date of appointment	Position in table
Montpellier	(France) René Girard	Mutual consent	30 May 2013	Off-season	(France) Jean Fernandez	1 July 2013	Off-season
Rennes	(France) Frédéric Antonetti	Resigned	30 May 2013	Off-season	(France) Philippe Montanier	1 July 2013	Off-season
Ajaccio	(France) Albert Emon	Resigned	30 May 2013	Off-season	(Italy) Fabrizio Ravanelli	8 June 2013	Off-season
Lille	(France) Rudi Garcia	Mutual consent	3 June 2013	Off-season	(France) René Girard	14 June 2013	Off-season
Paris Saint-Germain	(Italy) Carlo Ancelotti	Signed by Real Madrid	25 June 2013	Off-season	(France) Laurent Blanc	25 June 2013	Off-season
Sochaux	(France) Eric Hély	Resigned	26 September 2013	20th	(Senegal) Omar Daf	27 September 2013	20th
Sochaux	(Senegal) Omar Daf	Caretaker	7 October 2013	19th	(France) Hervé Renard	7 October 2013	19th
Valenciennes	(France) Daniel Sanchez	Sacked	7 October 2013	20th	(Belgium) Ariël Jacobs	14 October 2013	20th
Ajaccio	(Italy) Fabrizio Ravanelli	Sacked	2 November 2013	19th	(France) Christian Bracconi	4 November 2013	19th
Montpellier	(France) Jean Fernandez	Resigned	5 December 2013	17th	(France) Rolland Courbis	9 December 2013	17th
Marseille	(France) Elie Baup	Sacked	7 December 2013	5th	(France) José Anigo	7 December 2013	5th

=== Ligue 2 ===
Team	Outgoing head coach	Manner of departure	Date of vacancy	Position in table	Incoming head coach	Date of appointment	Position in table
Brest	(France) Corentin Martins	End of tenure as caretaker	31 May 2013	Off-season	(France) Alex Dupont	31 May 2013	Off-season
Tours	(France) Bernard Blaquart	Resigned	23 June 2013	Off-season	(France) Olivier Pantaloni	25 June 2013	Off-season
Lens	(France) Éric Sikora	Sacked	25 June 2013	Off-season	(France) Antoine Kombouaré	25 June 2013	Off-season
Nancy	(France) Patrick Gabriel	Sacked	12 October 2013	15th	(Uruguay) Pablo Correa	12 October 2013	15th
Châteauroux	(France) Didier Tholot	Sacked	28 October 2013	17th	(France) Jean-Louis Garcia	28 October 2013	17th
Nîmes	(France) Victor Zvunka	Sacked	19 December 2013	19th	(France) René Marsiglia	26 December 2013	19th
Laval	(France) Philippe Hinschberger	Sacked	24 February 2014	19th	(France) Denis Zanko	24 February 2014	19th
Auxerre	(France) Bernard Casoni	Sacked	17 March 2014	15th	(France) Jean-Luc Vannuchi	17 March 2014	15th
Istres	(France) José Pasqualetti	Sacked	24 March 2014	17th	(France) Frédéric Arpinon	24 March 2014	17th

== Competitions ==
Competition	Winner	Details	Match Report
Ligue 1	Paris Saint-Germain	2013–14 Ligue 1	
Ligue 2	FC Metz	2013–14 Ligue 2	
Championnat National	US Orléans	2013–14 Championnat National	
Championnat de France amateur	FC Chambly	2013–14 Championnat de France Amateur Group A	
Championnat de France amateur	SAS Épinal	2013–14 Championnat de France Amateur Group B	
Championnat de France amateur	GS Consolat	2013–14 Championnat de France Amateur Group C	
Championnat de France amateur	US Avranches	2013–14 Championnat de France Amateur Group D	
Championnat de France amateur 2		2013–14 Championnat de France amateur 2	
Division 1 Féminine	Olympique Lyonnais	2013–14 Division 1 Féminine	
Coupe de France	Guingamp	2013–14 Coupe de France	
Coupe de la Ligue	Paris Saint-Germain	2013–14 Coupe de la Ligue	
Coupe de France Féminine	Olympique Lyonnais	2013–14 Coupe de France Féminine	
Coupe Gambardella	AJ Auxerre	2013–14 Coupe Gambardella	
Trophée des Champions	Paris Saint-Germain	2013 Trophée des Champions	

=== International competitions ===
==== Men's ====
Team / Competition	UEFA Champions League	UEFA Europa League
Lyon	Play-off round eliminated by (Spain) Real Sociedad	Quarter-finals eliminated by (Italy) Juventus
Marseille	Group stage eliminated	Did not qualify
Paris Saint-Germain	Quarter-finals eliminated by (England) Chelsea	Did not qualify
Saint-Étienne	Did not qualify	Play-off round eliminated by (Denmark) Esbjerg
Nice	Did not qualify	Play-off round eliminated by (Cyprus) Apollon Limassol
Bordeaux	Did not qualify	Group stage Eliminated

==== Women's ====
Team / Competition	UEFA Women's Champions League
Lyon	Round of 16 eliminated by (Germany) Turbine Potsdam
Paris Saint-Germain	Round of 32 eliminated by (Sweden) Tyresö

== National teams ==
=== France ===
Friendly

14 August 2013	Belgium	0–0	France	Brussels, Belgium
21:00 UTC+2		Report		Stadium: King Baudouin Stadium; Attendance: 45,000; Referee: Craig Thomson (Scotland)

11 October 2013	France	6–0	Australia	Paris, France
20:45 UTC+2	Ribéry 8' (pen.); Giroud 16', 27'; Cabaye 29'; Debuchy 47'; Benzema 51'	Report		Stadium: Parc des Princes; Attendance: 38,000; Referee: Artur Manuel Ribeiro Soares Dias (Portugal)

5 March 2014	France	2–0	Netherlands	Saint-Denis, France
21:00 UTC+1	Benzema 32'; Matuidi 41'	Report		Stadium: Stade de France; Attendance: 80,000; Referee: Martin Atkinson (England)

2014 FIFA World Cup qualification

6 September 2013 2014 FIFA World Cup Q	Georgia	0–0	France	Tbilisi, Georgia
22:15 UTC+4		Report		Stadium: Dinamo Arena; Attendance: 26,360; Referee: Fırat Aydınus (Turkey)

10 September 2013 2014 FIFA World Cup Q	Belarus	2–4	France	Gomel, Belarus
22:00 UTC+3	Filipenko 32'; Kalachev 57'	Report	Ribéry 47' (pen.), 64'; Nasri 71'; Pogba 73'	Stadium: Central Stadium; Attendance: 12,203; Referee: Daniele Orsato (Italy)

15 October 2013 2014 FIFA World Cup Q	France	3–0	Finland	Saint-Denis, France
21:00 UTC+2	Ribéry 8'; Toivio 76' (o.g.); Benzema 87'	Report		Stadium: Stade de France; Attendance: 70,156; Referee: Michael Koukoulakis (Greece)

15 November 2013 2014 FIFA World Cup Q Play-Off	Ukraine	2–0	France	Kyiv, Ukraine
21:45 UTC+2	Zozulya 62'; Yarmolenko 82' (pen.)	Report		Stadium: Olympic Stadium, Kyiv; Attendance: 67,732; Referee: Cüneyt Çakır (Turkey)

19 November 2013 2014 FIFA World Cup Q Play-Off	France	3–0	Ukraine	Saint-Denis, France
21:00 UTC+1	Sakho 22', 72'; Benzema 34'	Report		Stadium: Stade de France; Attendance: 77,098; Referee: Damir Skomina (Slovenia)

Last updated: 7 August 2014
Source: French Football Federation

=== France (Women's) ===
UEFA Women's Euro 2013

12 July 2013	France	3–1	Russia	Nya Parken, Norrköping
18:00	Delie 21', 33'; Le Sommer 67'	Report	Morozova 84'	Attendance: 2,980; Referee: Jenny Palmqvist (Sweden)

15 July 2013	Spain	0–1	France	Nya Parken, Norrköping
20:30		Report	Renard 5'	Attendance: 5,068; Referee: Carina Vitulano (Italy)

18 July 2013	France	3–0	England	Arena Linköping, Linköping
20:30	Le Sommer 9'; Nécib 62'; Renard 64'	Report		Attendance: 7,332; Referee: Kirsi Heikkinen (Finland)

22 July 2013	France	1–1 (a.e.t.) (2–4 p)	Denmark	Arena Linköping, Linköping
20:45	Nécib 71' (pen.)	Report	Rasmussen 28'	Attendance: 7,448; Referee: Carina Vitulano (Italy)
	Penalties
	Nécib (penalty missed); Thiney (penalty scored); Le Sommer (penalty scored); Delannoy (penalty missed)		(penalty scored) Røddik Hansen; (penalty scored) Rydahl Bukh; (penalty scored) Nadim; (penalty missed) Nielsen; (penalty scored) Arnth Jensen

Last updated: 7 August 2013
Source: French Football Federation

=== France U-21 ===
Friendly

13 August 2013	Germany	0–0	France	Dreisamstadion, Freiburg, Germany
		Report

18 November 2013	France	1–1	Netherlands	Stade Ernest-Wallon, Toulouse, France
19:30	Ntep 44'		Trindade de Vilhena 60'	Attendance: 4,867; Referee: Markus Hameter (Austria)

2015 UEFA European Under-21 Championship qualification

5 September 2013	France	5–0	Kazakhstan

9 September 2013	Belarus	1–2	France

10 October 2013	Armenia	1–4	France

14 October 2013	Iceland	3–4	France

14 November 2013	France	6–0	Armenia

4 March 2014	France	1–0	Belarus

Last updated: 7 August 2014
Source: French Football Federation U-21 Schedule
