= Pablo Correa =

Uruguayan footballer and coach (born 1967)

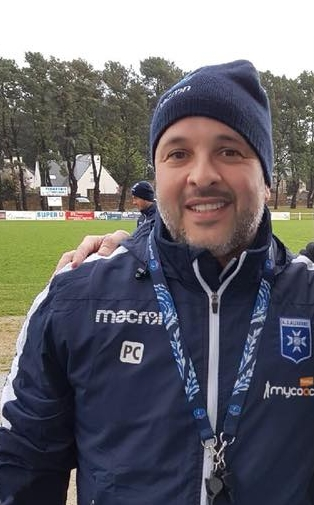

Personal information
- Full name: Pablo Alejandro Correa Velázquez
- Date of birth: 14 March 1967 (age 59)
- Place of birth: Montevideo, Uruguay
- Height: 1.71 m (5 ft 7 in)
- Position: Striker

Senior career*
Years	Team	Apps	(Gls)
1979–1986	Nacional		
1986–1988	Rentistas		
1988–1990	Peñarol		
1990–1991	Rentistas		
1991–1993	Defensor Sporting		
1993–1994	San Lorenzo	3	(0)
1994–1995	Montevideo Wanderers		
1995–2000	Nancy	119	(28)

Managerial career
- 2002–2011: Nancy
- 2012: Évian Thonon Gaillard
- 2013–2017: Nancy
- 2017–2019: Auxerre
- 2021–2022: Virton
- 2023–2026: Nancy
- * Club domestic league appearances and goals

Pablo Alejandro Correa Velázquez (born 14 March 1967) is a Uruguayan football coach and a former player.

== Playing career ==
Correa started his footballing career as a player in Uruguay, where he played for Nacional, Rentistas, Peñarol and Defensor Sporting.

In 1993, he joined San Lorenzo in Argentina, but returned to Uruguay after only three games with the club to join Montevideo Wanderers.

In 1995, Correa moved to France, where he played the remainder of his career in Ligue 1 and Ligue 2 for Nancy. (Note: Pablo Correa – French league stats at LFP – also available in French (archived)) Correa played up front with Tony Cascarino and became a hit with the Nancy fans.

== Managerial career ==
After his retirement as a player, he joined the coaching staff at Nancy and was appointed as the club manager in 2002.

In the summer of 2005, Correa secured Nancy's promotion to Ligue 1 by winning the 2004–05 Ligue 2 title and after spending the previous five seasons in Ligue 2. Correa guided Nancy to the 2006 Coupe de la Ligue Final final against Nice, in which Nancy won 2–1, giving them a spot in the 2006–07 UEFA Cup. Nancy survived their first Ligue 1 season of the 21st century, finishing in 12th position and notably beating Saint-Étienne 2–0 and Rennes 6–0 in home Ligue 1 matches.

On 25 May 2011, Correa announced he would terminate his contract after the end of the season. He had been Nancy's club manager for nine consecutive years since 2002.

On 2 January 2012, Correa was named as new coach of Ligue 1 side Évian Thonon Gaillard, replacing Bernard Casoni. Following a poor start to the 2012–13 season, during which the club lost three and drew one of their first four 2012–13 Ligue 1 matches, he was sacked on 3 September 2012 and replaced by Pascal Dupraz.

Correa returned to Nancy on 12 October 2013, replacing Patrick Gabriel. Following relegation from Ligue 1 in the summer of 2017 and a poor start to the 2017–18 Ligue 2 season, he was sacked on 29 August 2017.

On 20 December 2017, Correa was named as the new coach of Auxerre. Following a run of four consecutive Ligue 2 defeats, he was sacked on 18 March 2019.

In December 2021, he became the new manager of Belgian club Virton. He left the club in July 2022.

== Managerial statistics ==
As of 17 April 2022

Managerial record by team and tenure
Team	Nat	From	To	Record				
Team	Nat	From	To	G	W	D	L	Win %
Nancy	(France)	6 November 2002	5 June 2011	384	143	111	130	37.24
Évian Thonon Gaillard	(France)	2 January 2012	3 September 2012	26	9	6	11	34.62
Nancy	(France)	12 October 2013	29 August 2017	166	69	45	52	41.57
Auxerre	(France)	20 December 2017	18 March 2019	55	21	10	24	38.18
Virton	(Belgium)	22 December 2021	30 June 2022	12	2	1	9	16.67
Total				643	244	173	226	37.95

== Honours ==
=== Manager ===
Nancy

- Coupe de la Ligue: 2005–06
