= Duarig =

French shoe brand

- Company type: Private
- Industry: Textile
- Founded: 1886
- Defunct: 2014
- Headquarters: Balbigny, France
- Key people: M. Giraud
- Products: Apparel, Footwear
- Website: www.duarig.fr

Duarig was a footwear trademark founded in 1886 in Balbigny (France) by M. Giraud.

== Sponsorships ==
Teams that have used Duarig equipment:

=== Football ===
- (Algeria) CS Constantine
- (Cape Verde) São Vicente football team
- (France) Olympique Lyonnais
- (France) FC Lorient
- (Democratic Republic of the Congo) SM Sanga Balende
- (Saudi Arabia) Al Nassr FC
- (Ukraine) Dynamo Kyiv
- (France) AS Saint-Étienne
- (France) AC Ajaccio
