= Derby Breton =

Football match between Stade Rennais and FC Nantes

Derby de la Bretagne
- Other names: Derby Breton
- Location: Brittany
- Teams: Brest; Guingamp; Lorient; Nantes; Rennes
- First meeting: 15 December 1963
- Latest meeting: Rennes 2–1 Nantes; Ligue 1 (26 April 2026)

Statistics
- Most wins: Nantes (87)
- Largest victory: Nantes 6–1 Rennes (3 September 1969)

The Derby de la Bretagne (French pronunciation: [dɛʁbi də la bʁətaɲ], Brittany Derby), also known as the Derby Breton (French pronunciation: [dɛʁbi bʁətɔ̃]), is a football match in France. The match can potentially designate any match two clubs based in the historic province of Brittany; however, most of the time, it is employed by each club's supporters to mention the rivalry between major clubs Stade Rennais and FC Nantes, even if this particular fixture is often referred to as the West Derby.

== History ==
The term is derived from its location in the former province of Brittany, and in addition to the principal rivalry between the two major clubs, Stade Rennais and FC Nantes, may also refer to matches involving FC Lorient, En Avant Guingamp or Stade Brestois. These five clubs are each the most successful in the five departments of historic Brittany (smaller clubs such as Quimper Kerfeunteun F.C., US Saint-Malo, Stade Briochin, Vannes OC and most recently US Concarneau have had limited periods of success on a regional level). As such, matches between them are a matter of regional pride and interest rather than a traditional 'local derby' of very close geographic proximity, the five localities being an average of around 160 kilometres (99 mi) apart– the greatest distance is between Brest and Nantes, approximately 290 kilometres (180 mi).

Rennes and Nantes first met in the 1949–50 Coupe de France, Rennes winning on that occasion. Following their match in October 2023 the fixture has been played 104 times in official competitions, with Nantes ahead with 44 wins to Rennes's 35, and 25 draws. (Note: The October 2023 match was reported in the media as the 100th, but 104 matches are recorded elsewhere, with the discrepancy seemingly arising from 4 Coupe de France matches, all won by Nantes – however, four other matches in this competition are included in all totals.) A historic rivalry also exists between the cities over which is the "real capital of Brittany" (Nantes was administratively separated from the rest of the territory in 1941 to anchor its own region, Pays de la Loire, while similarly sized Rennes has been the sole capital of the Brittany region since then) and both clubs display their Breton heritage proudly; Rennes supporters regularly display Celtic symbols at Tribune Mordelles, where the notorious supporters' group Roazhon Celtic Kop are located, while Nantes often display the Bretagne flag in their primary colors, yellow and green.

Lorient's elevated status in the derby came about from their promotion to Ligue 1 at the turn of the 21st century (1998–99 then 2001–02. Though relegated immediately on both occasions, they went up again for the 2006–07 season and this time remained in the top division consistently. This was in direct contrast to Nantes, eight-time French champions and members of the top tier since 1963, who finished 20th in that 2006–07 season and were relegated to the second division. They went back up then down again over the next two years, and did not regain what would prove to be a regular Ligue 1 place until the 2013–14 season; in their absence, the main Breton derby was considered to be contested by Rennes and Lorient (although Brest were also in the league in three of those seasons).

There was heightened interest in Breton clubs following the 2–1 victory by lower-division Guingamp over Rennes in the 2009 Coupe de France final; this was the first final since 1956 where both participating clubs were based in the same region (Note: Disregarding two finals between Olympique Marseille and AS Monaco FC – the tiny independent Principality of Monaco is surrounded by the Provence-Alpes-Côte d'Azur region.) and both clubs displayed their Breton culture proudly. The pair met again in the 2014 Coupe de France final, won by Guingamp again (by this time they had been promoted to Ligue 1, but were still the underdogs). Owing to the attention generated by these finals, matches between these two clubs specifically were referred to as Le Celtico at times (this term was copyrighted by the clubs in 2016). Although they had since played in the league several times, the first cup match between the clubs since the 2014 final took place in January 2024.

At least one club from historic Brittany has taken part in the French top flight in every season since 1958–59. Since 1983–84, there have been 18 seasons featuring three Breton teams; an additional eight top division seasons have involved four – 2023–24 Ligue 1 is the 9th (it is Rennes' 67th overall at that level, Nantes' 55th, Brest's 18th and Lorient's 17th, while Guingamp have 13, their most recent being in 2018–19). Owing to the somewhat 'yo-yo' status of all the clubs apart from Rennes since the 2000s, there has yet to be a Ligue 1 campaign featuring all five.

== Statistics ==
=== Nantes – Rennes ===
As of last match played: 20 September 2025

| Club | Pld | W | D | L | GF | GA | +/– |
League (All Divisions)
| Nantes | 97 | 37 | 26 | 34 | 124 | 124 | +0 |
| Rennes | 97 | 34 | 26 | 37 | 124 | 124 | –0 |
Coupe de France
| Nantes | 8 | 6 | 0 | 2 | 20 | 8 | +12 |
| Rennes | 8 | 2 | 0 | 6 | 8 | 20 | –12 |
Coupe de la Ligue
| Nantes | 2 | 1 | 0 | 1 | 5 | 4 | +1 |
| Rennes | 2 | 1 | 0 | 1 | 4 | 5 | –1 |
Trophée des Champions
| Nantes | 1 | 1 | 0 | 0 | 4 | 2 | +2 |
| Rennes | 1 | 0 | 1 | 0 | 2 | 4 | –2 |
Total
| Nantes | 108 | 45 | 26 | 37 | 153 | 138 | +15 |
| Rennes | 108 | 37 | 26 | 45 | 138 | 153 | –15 |

=== Lorient – Nantes ===
As of last match played: 24 February 2024

| Club | Pld | W | D | L | GF | GA | +/– |
League (All Divisions)
| Lorient | 20 | 4 | 6 | 10 | 22 | 27 | –5 |
| Nantes | 20 | 10 | 6 | 4 | 27 | 22 | +5 |
Coupe de France
| Lorient | 2 | 1 | 0 | 1 | 1 | 2 | –1 |
| Nantes | 2 | 1 | 0 | 1 | 2 | 1 | +1 |
Coupe de la Ligue
| Lorient | 1 | 0 | 0 | 1 | 0 | 2 | –2 |
| Nantes | 1 | 1 | 0 | 0 | 2 | 0 | +2 |
Total
| Lorient | 23 | 5 | 6 | 12 | 23 | 31 | –8 |
| Nantes | 23 | 12 | 6 | 5 | 31 | 23 | + |

=== Lorient – Rennes ===
As of last match played: 24 August 2025

| Club | Pld | W | D | L | GF | GA | +/– |
League (All Divisions)
| Lorient | 33 | 9 | 10 | 14 | 35 | 46 | –11 |
| Rennes | 33 | 14 | 10 | 9 | 46 | 35 | +11 |
Coupe de France
| Lorient | 4 | 1 | 1 | 2 | 4 | 7 | –3 |
| Rennes | 4 | 2 | 1 | 1 | 7 | 4 | +3 |
Coupe de la Ligue
| Lorient | 2 | 1 | 0 | 1 | 3 | 3 | 0 |
| Rennes | 2 | 1 | 0 | 1 | 3 | 3 | 0 |
Total
| Lorient | 39 | 11 | 11 | 17 | 42 | 56 | –14 |
| Rennes | 39 | 17 | 11 | 11 | 56 | 42 | +14 |
