= Groupama =

French insurance group

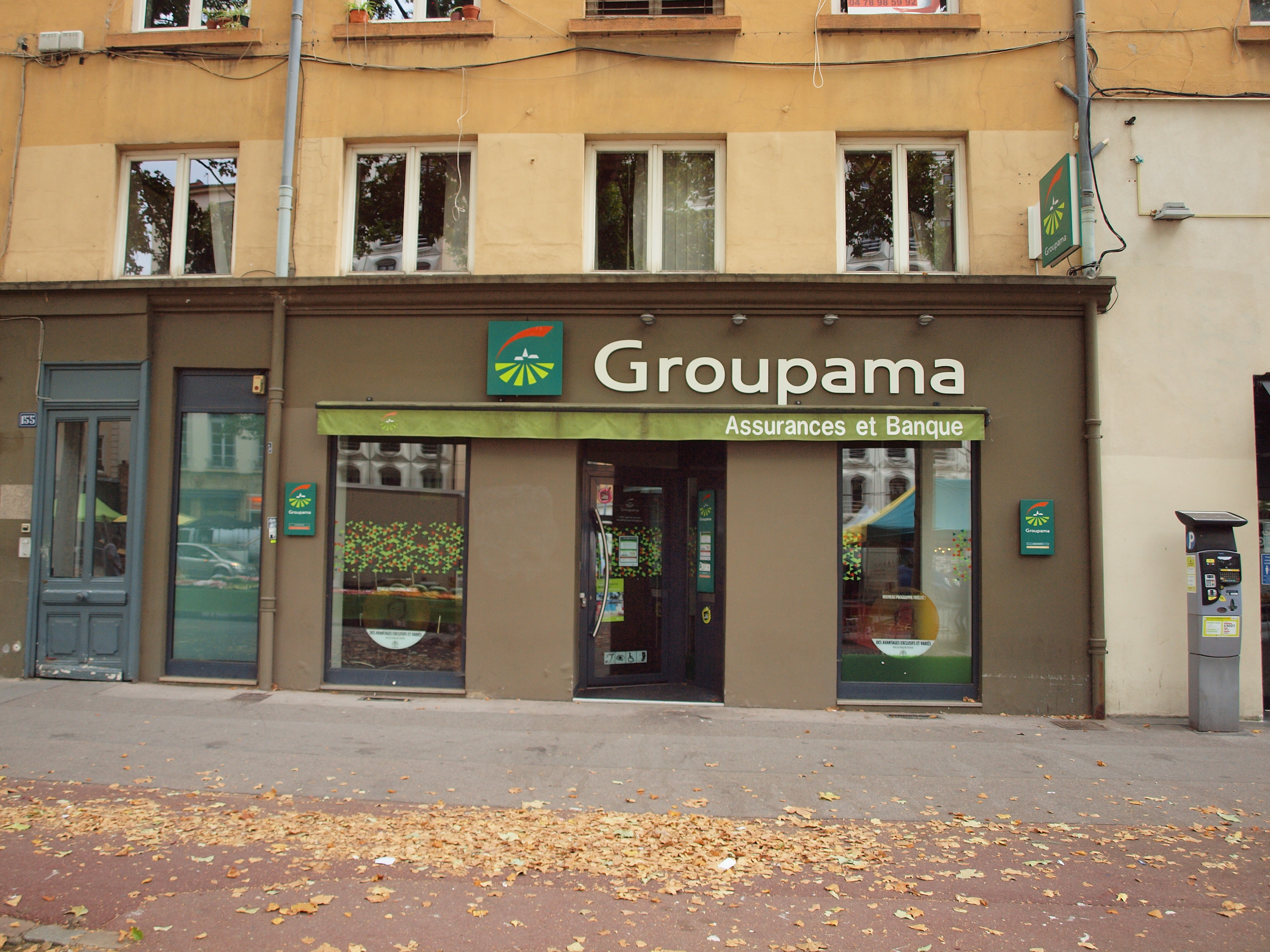
- Groupama branch at Place de la Croix-Rousse, Lyon, France.
- Type: Mutual company
- Industry: Insurance, financial services
- Founded: July 4, 1900; 126 years ago
- Headquarters: Paris, France
- Area served: France, Italy, Hungary, Romania, Greece, Bulgaria, Slovakia, Turkey, China, Croatia
- Key people: Laurent Poupart (president); Thierry Martel (general manager)
- Products: Insurance
- Revenue: €20. billion (2025)
- Net income: €1.0bn (2025)
- Number of employees: 32,000 (2025)
- Subsidiaries: Gan
- Website: www.groupama.com

Groupama, an abbreviation for Groupe des Assurances Mutuelles Agricoles (English: Group of Mutual Agricultural Insurances), is a French insurance group headquartered in Paris with operations in 10 countries. In 2005, it ranked as the 2nd largest mutual insurer in the world.

== History ==
=== Predecessor companies (1840s-1980s) ===
The Agricultural Mutual Insurance Companies (Assurances Mutuelles Agricoles) was founded in the 19th century by a group of farmers to address their own specific insurance needs. It was set up as a mutual organisation and focused on agricultural as well as individuals, professionals, local authorities and businesses.

Groupama was established on December 22, 1840, when farmers in Mions (Rhône) founded the first local agricultural mutual fire insurer. The legal framework for Agricultural Mutual Insurance Funds was defined by a law passed on July 4, 1900. A central fund for agricultural reinsurance was created for "Fire" in 1906 and for "Livestock" in 1908.

In 1963, Samda was established to provide risk protection for non-agricultural damage. In 1972, SORAVIE (Society of Agricultural Organizations Life Insurance) was created in partnership with Crédit Agricole, followed by the introduction of SOS-AMA, a generalized assistance service, in 1975.

=== Formation and expansion (1986-2017) ===
Groupama was formed in 1986, when AMA, Samda, SORAVIE, and SOREMA merged under the name. In 1992 B.CERP bank, which took the name of Groupama Financial Bank was created. In 1998 Groupama acquired Gan, the 4th largest French insurer at that time, making Groupama the second largest French general insurer. At the end of 1999, Groupama's acquired Gan business was hit by large claims from exceptional storms and floods. After losses related to storms in late 1999, Groupama sold its two reinsurance entities, although it kept its Lloyd's syndicate Broadgate. In May 2001, it sold Sorema S.A. and Sorema North American Reinsurance Co. to SCOR, the largest reinsurer in France. Groupama became SCOR's largest shareholder with 17.4% of stock, and received €344 million (US$295.2 million) for the sale. By 2001 Groupama expanded its banking services and continued to expand its insurance business in France and other countries through acquisitions.

Groupama was listed in the 2007 ICA Global 300 list of mutuals and cooperatives, ranked 6th by 2005 turnover, making it the 2nd largest mutual insurer in the world at the time. In 2009 it acquired Banque Finama, merging it with its Groupama Banque division founded in 2003. The new entity was dubbed Groupama Banque.

The company experienced financial difficulties in 2011, and sold several subsidiaries in 2011 and early 2012. In early October 2012, it announced that it would not pay interest on a portion of its debt by the October 22 deadline, describing the decision as part of an ongoing financial recovery plan initiated earlier that year. In 2012, Jean-Yves Dagès became Groupama president. Since 2024, the President is Laurent Poupar t.

=== Recent developments (2018-present) ===
In June 2018, Groupama SA, the central body of the Groupama group, was transformed into a national mutual reinsurance fund under the name Groupama Assurances Mutuelles.

In early 2021, Groupama acquired Juritravail, a company specialized in remote legal content and advice services. In late 2021, the telecoms group Orange agreed to buy Groupama's 22% stake in Orange Bank. Groupama posted a net profit of 454 million euros in 2022. In 2023, Groupama had 31,000 employees. That June, François Schmitt, former president of Groupama Grand Est, succeeded Jean-Yves Dagès as chairman of the group. Thierry Martel is currently CEO of Groupama Assurances Mutuelles.

== Sponsorships ==
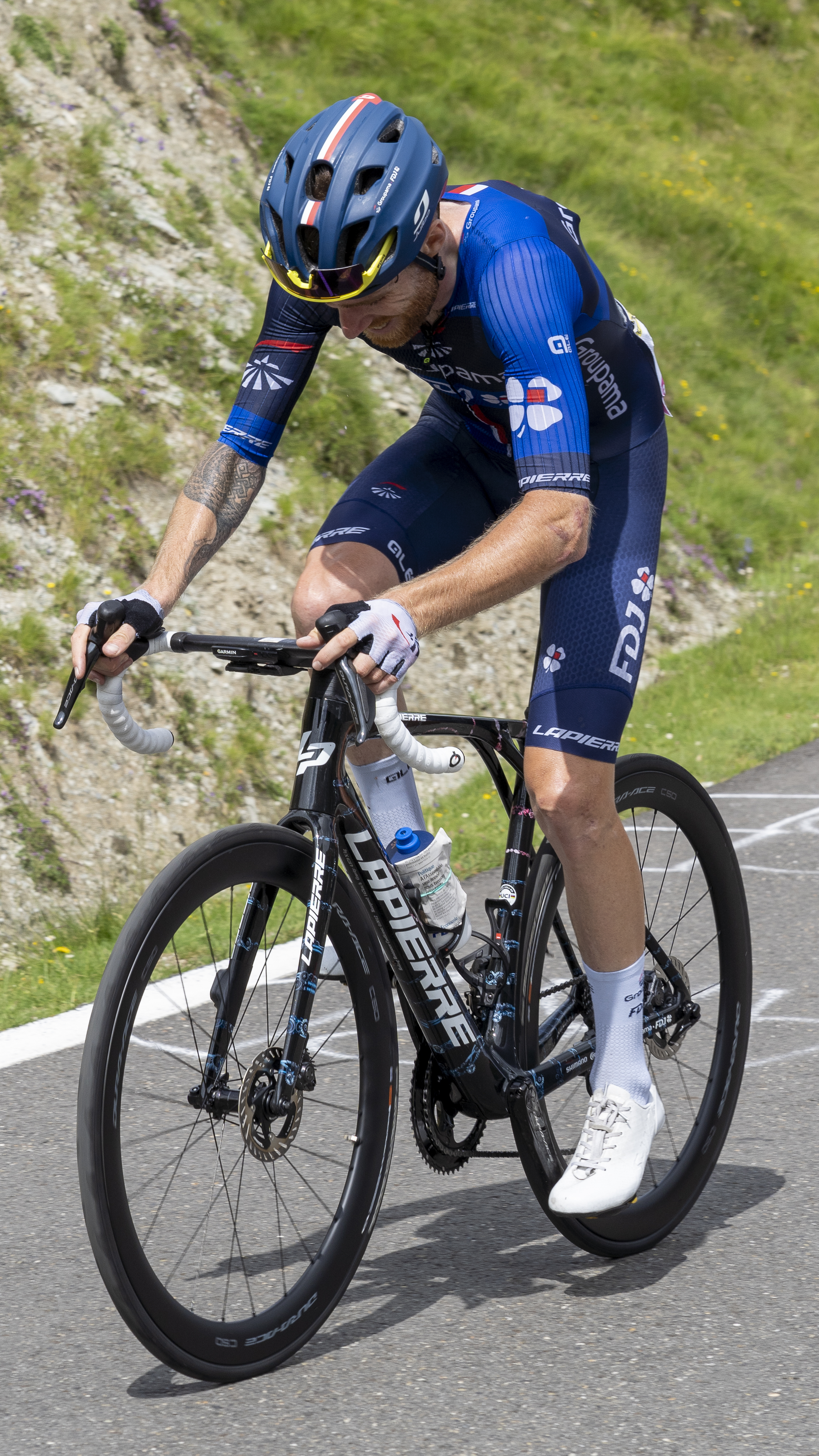
Groupama livery, Quentin Pacher at the Tour de France 2023

The company has or has had a number of high-profile sponsorships with stadiums and sports teams. Including:

- Groupama-FDJ United, a French cycling team
- Groupama 3, the former name of IDEC SPORT, a trimaran team
- Groupama 4, a Volvo Open 70 yacht
- Groupama Arena, a stadium in Budapest, Hungary that bears the company's name via a sponsorship deal
- Parc Olympique Lyonnais, a stadium near Lyon, France also known as Groupama Stadium through a sponsorship deal with this company

== Regions ==
Based in France, in 2026, Groupama Group is present in 10 countries total. It had 6 million customers in France, and 6.5 million internationally. Its operations locations in 2026 were mainly in Europe (France, Croatia, Italy, Hungary, Romania, Greece, Bulgaria, Slovenia), and in Tunisia and in China.

== See also ==
- List of investors in Bernard L. Madoff Securities
