= VEKA =

German uPVC profile business

VEKA Aktiengesellschaft
- Type: Private
- Industry: uPVC profiles; uPVC sheet systems
- Founded: 1967
- Founder: Heinrich Laumann
- Headquarters: Sendenhorst, Germany
- Area served: Global
- Website: www.veka.de

VEKA AG is a German extruder of uPVC profiles for use in windows, doors, roller shutters and sliding doors headquartered in Sendenhorst, Germany. Founded in 1967 as a manufacturer of shutters, it currently operates its own extrusion facilities in twelve countries. It also operates representative offices in more than forty countries, including the United Arab Emirates and India.

== History ==
VEKA was founded in Sendenhorst, West Germany under the name Vekaplast in 1967 and initially produced only roller shutters. Two years later, Heinrich Laumann, one of the eight employees at the time, bought the company. In 1970, VEKA started developing its own window profile and put it on the market in 1971. In 1974, the product line was expanded to include front doors and sliding door systems. Due to growing demand, the company acquired his 115,000 square meters of land on the industrial site in Sendenhorst and built a new extrusion plant there after surpassing his 15,000 square meters of leased plant. The first 10,500 square meters of the new factory were completed in 1977, with extensions added in 1979 and 1980, tripling the factory's size to 31,500 square meters. In 1981, VEKA opened its first mixing plant in Sendenhorst.

In 1983, VEKA decided to increase its exports to foreign markets due to economic stagnation in West Germany, establishing subsidiaries in Spain, France, and the United States within a year. In 1985, the company began manufacturing PVC sheets. In 1986, VEKA established a subsidiary in the United Kingdom, which quickly began production for the British market. Belgian PVC and PE film manufacturers Isoblec, Azotherm and ACE were also acquired. The Sendenhorst plant has been expanded to include a high performance mixing plant and a production hall for additional sheet extruders.

VEKA was incorporated in 1990 as VEKA GmbH. The following year, the company established the waste disposal subsidiary VEKA Umwelttechnik GmbH in Behringen, Germany. In 1992, VEKA GmbH was transformed into a public limited liability company and the Laumann family retained control of the company. In 1993, VEKA opened a 120,000 square foot recycling center and established a subsidiary, VEKA West, Inc., in Reno, Nevada to serve the western United States. VEKA Holdings Inc. was also established to manage his VEKA operations in the United States. Between 1994 and 1999, VEKA established branches in Poland, Russia, Argentina and Singapore.

In 1999, VEKA celebrated its 30th anniversary and it was attended by 2,200 guests from 37 countries. Heinrich Laumann received honorary citizenship from the city of Sendenhorst and was decorated by the Federal Republic of Germany for his entrepreneurial performance. In 2000, Laumann stepped down from the Board of Directors, becoming the chairman of the Supervisory Board. Hubert Hecker was named the new chairman of the Board of Directors. That year, VEKA established subsidiaries in Romania, Mexico, and Brazil.

In 2002, VEKA Holdings Inc. acquired the Canadian extruder Berlinex, renaming it VEKA Canada Holdings Comp. Between 2003 and 2006, subsidiaries were established in India, Malaysia, and Ukraine. In 2006, VEKA established VEKA South in Terrell, Texas, to serve the southern United States, Central America, and the Caribbean.

On 7 October 2016, Andreas Hartleif was appointed CEO of VEKA.

In 2017, VEKA was the winner of the Lancashire Red Rose Awards "Large Business", and Burnley Business "Employer of the Year" Awards.
