= Derby du Nord =

Football rivalry in France

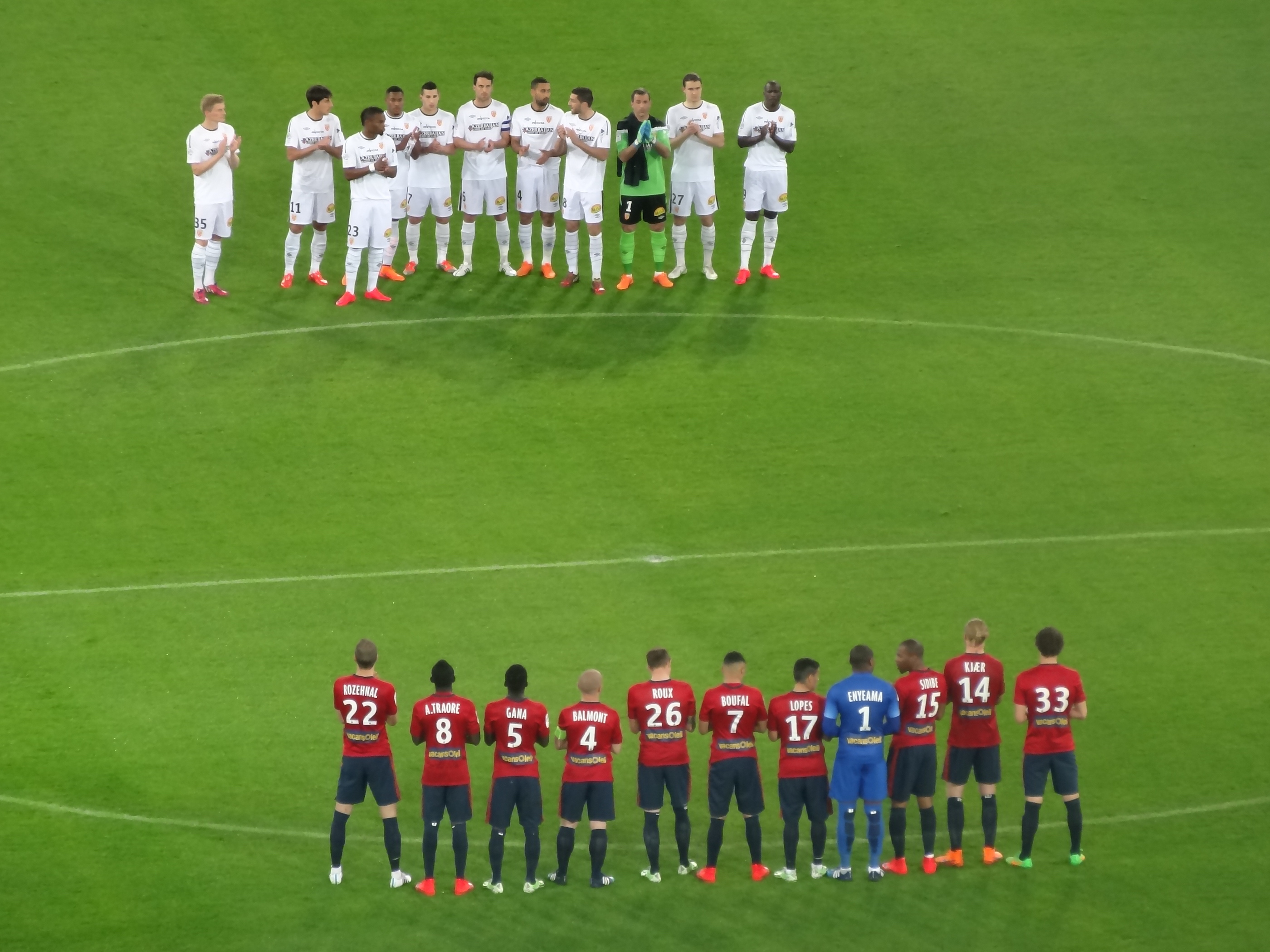
- The derby on 3 May 2015
- Other names: Northern Derby
- Location: Hauts-de-France
- Teams: Lens; Lille
- First meeting: 11 March 1945; Division 1 (North); Lille 4–0 Lens
- Latest meeting: 30 October 2026; Ligue 1 Lille 1–0 Lens
- Stadiums: Stade Bollaert-Delelis (Lens); Stade Pierre-Mauroy (Lille)

Statistics
- Total meetings: 124
- Most wins: Lille (50)
- Top scorer: Jean Baratte (9)
- All-time series: Lille: 50; Drawn: 36; Lens: 38
- Largest victory: Lille 5–0 Lens (1950, 1952)

The Derby du Nord (French pronunciation: [dɛʁbi du nɔʁ], lit. 'Northern Derby') is a football rivalry contested between northern French clubs Lens, founded in 1906, and Lille, founded in 1944 through a merger between Olympique Lillois and SC Fives. Both clubs are two of the region's most successful clubs but are located in different departments, with Lens being in Pas-de-Calais, and Lille in Nord.

At the beginning of the 20th century, the name referred to matches between Olympique Lillois and US Tourquennoise, as well as matches between RC Roubaix and Excelsior AC.

Currently, the name can refer to matches involving Lille and Valenciennes as both clubs are located within the Nord department; however, the name historically applies mainly to matches involving Lille and Lens. As a result, the Lille–Valenciennes match is sometimes referred to as the Petit Derby du Nord.

== History ==
The two cities first met in 1937 when Lille were playing under the Olympique Lillois emblem. Due to each club's close proximity towards each other being separated by only 40 kilometres (25 mi) and sociological differences between each club's supporters, a fierce rivalry developed. The first meeting of the sides in current form was happened on 11 March 1945, when Lille beaten Lens 4–0 in the league's north division held immediately after the liberation of France.

Historically, the Derby du Nord was underpinned by social and economic differences, since the city of Lens is known as an old, working-class, industrial city and Lille as a middle-class, modern, internationally oriented one. In recent times, this social class opposition is no longer as relevant where both fanbases now come from both lower and middle classes.

== Statistics ==
=== Head-to-head record ===
As of 30 October 2026

Competition	Played	Lille	Draw	Lens
Division 1/Ligue 1	105	42	33	30
Division 2/Ligue 2	6	2	1	3
Coupe de France	10	6	1	3
Coupe de la Ligue	1	0	0	1
Championnat de France Amateur (1935–1971)	2	0	1	1
Total	124	50	36	38

=== Honours ===
As of 16 August 2026

Competition	Titles won	
Competition	Lille	Lens
Division 1/Ligue 1	4	1
Coupe de France	6	1
Coupe de la Ligue	0	1
Trophée des Champions	1	1
National total	11	4
UEFA Intertoto Cup	1	1
International total	1	1
Overall total	12	5

== See also ==
- Football records and statistics in France
