= Breizh Cola =

French cola brand

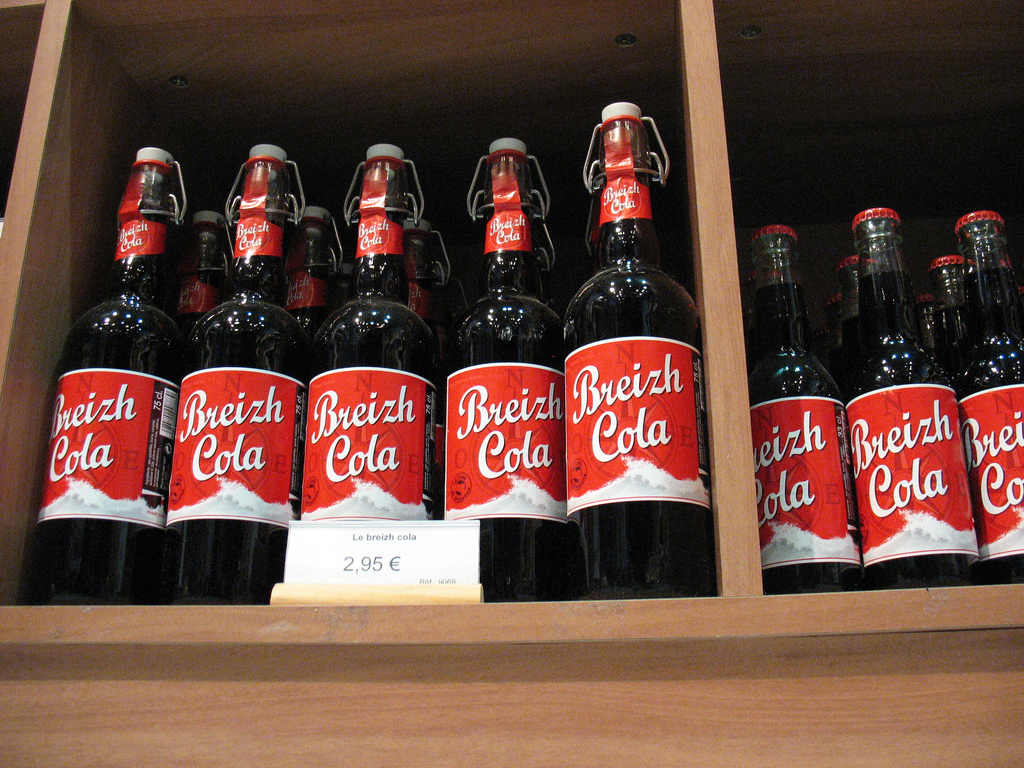
- Bottles of Breizh Cola
- Manufacturer: Lancelot Brewery
- Distributor: Phare Ouest
- Country of origin: France
- Introduced: 2002; 23 years ago
- Flavour: Cola
- Website: www.breizhcola.bzh

Breizh Cola (pronounced [brɛjs kola], from the Breton word for Brittany), is a brand of cola bottled by Phare Ouest (Note: Literally West lighthouse. This is a pun on the phrase Far West, the French equivalent of Wild West.) and sold in Brittany, France. It is one of many new types of alternate cola, or "altercola," competing with more established and widespread brands such as Coca-Cola and Pepsi-Cola.

Lancelot Brewery launched Breizh Cola in 2002, after one of the owners, Bernard Lancelot, noticed colas from the United States in a home in the middle of the Guatemalan jungle during a trip in 1997. Altercolas like Breizh Cola appeal to consumers because they offer different and unique flavours, and are also popular with those concerned about preserving diversity of choice in beverages.
