= Derby de la Garonne =

French football rivalry

- Other names: Garonne derby
- Location: Southern France
- Teams: Bordeaux; Toulouse
- First meeting: Bordeaux 1–1 Toulouse (20 October 1946); 1946–47 French Division 1
- Latest meeting: Bordeaux 0–2 Toulouse (10 February 2021); 2020–21 Coupe de France
- Stadiums: Matmut Atlantique (Bordeaux); Stadium de Toulouse (Toulouse)

Statistics
- Total meetings: 89
- Most wins: Bordeaux (40)

The Derby de la Garonne (French pronunciation: [døbi də la ɡaʁɔn], Garonne Derby) is a football match contested between French clubs FC Girondins de Bordeaux and Toulouse FC. The derby is so-named because Bordeaux and Toulouse are the two major cities in south-western France and both are situated on the Garonne River. The consistency and competitiveness of the rivalry developed following Toulouse's return to Ligue 1 after being administratively relegated to the Championnat National in 2001.

Bordeaux and the current incarnation of Toulouse first met on 20 October 1946 and, due to the clubs' proximity to each other, being separated by 244 kilometres (152 mi), a competitive rivalry developed. Notable matches the teams contested include a 3–1 victory for Toulouse on the final day of the 2006–07 season which placed Toulouse in third place, which gave the club a qualification spot in the following year's UEFA Champions League. The following season, Bordeaux recorded a 4–3 victory over Toulouse at home. Bordeaux initially took a 3–0 lead into halftime on two goals from Wendel and one from Alou Diarra. However, in a span of 14 minutes in the second half, striker Johan Elmander of Toulouse converted a hat trick to even the match at 3–3. Four minutes from then, Wendel netted the game-winning goal. The match also was notable due in part to referee Bertrand Layec's issuing of nine yellow cards.

The Derby de la Garonne can also refer to matches involving local clubs within the city of Toulouse. Local amateur clubs such as Blagnac FC, Toulouse Rodéo, Balma SC, and Toulouse Fontaines contest similar Derby de la Garonne matches.

== Results ==
As of 10 February 2021

Competition	Played	Bordeaux wins	Draws	Toulouse wins	Bordeaux goals	Toulouse goals
Ligue 1	85	38	23	24	122	102
Coupe de France	2	1	0	1	2	3
Coupe de la Ligue	2	1	0	1	3	3
Total	89	40	23	26	127	108

== Honours ==
Table correct as of 2 May 2023

Bordeaux	Competition	Toulouse
Domestic
6	Ligue 1	—
1	Ligue 2	3
4	Coupe de France	1
3	Coupe de la Ligue	—
3	Trophée des Champions	—
17	Aggregate	4
European
1	UEFA Intertoto Cup	—
1	Aggregate	—
18	Total aggregate	4
