= Daniel Sanchez (French footballer) =

French footballer and manager (born 1953)

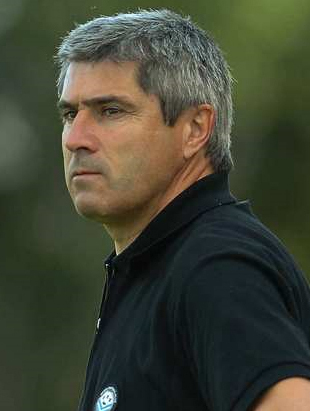
- Sanchez as manager of Tours in 2009

Personal information
- Date of birth: 21 November 1953 (age 72)
- Place of birth: Oujda, Morocco, French colonial empire
- Position: Striker

Senior career*
Years	Team	Apps	(Gls)
1972–1981	Nice	198	(50)
1981–1982	Paris Saint-Germain	19	(1)
1982–1983	Mulhouse	36	(3)
1983–1985	Saint-Étienne	32	(5)
1985–1987	Cannes	0	(0)
Total		285	(59)

Managerial career
- 1987–1990: Nice (U-18)
- 1990–1994: Nice youth academy and 2nd team
- 1995–1996: Villefranche
- 1996: Nice
- 1997–1998: Nagoya Grampus Eight (assistant)
- 1999: Nagoya Grampus Eight
- 2001–2003: Bordeaux (assistant)
- 2003–2004: Academy of Moscow
- 2004–2006: Saint-Étienne (assistant)
- 2007–2011: Tours
- 2011–2013: Valenciennes
- 2014–2015: Club Africain
- * Club domestic league appearances and goals

Daniel Sanchez (born 21 November 1953) is a French football manager and former professional player who played as a striker.

== Managerial statistics ==
Team	From	To	Record				
Team	From	To	G	W	D	L	Win %
Nagoya Grampus Eight	1999	1999	13	6	1	6	46.15
Total			13	6	1	6	46.15
