= Éric Hély =

French footballer and manager (born 1964)

Personal information
- Full name: Éric Hély
- Date of birth: 25 October 1964 (age 62)
- Place of birth: Dourdan, France
- Height: 1.80 m (5 ft 11 in)
- Position: Defender

Senior career*
Years	Team	Apps	(Gls)
1979–1983	Sochaux	2	(0)
1983–1985	Brest	8	(0)
1985–1986	Chamois Niortais	32	(0)
1986–1987	Alès	6	(0)
1987–1988	Châtellerault	32	(0)
1988–1990	Louhans-Cuiseaux	52	(0)
1990–1993	Châtellerault	66	(0)
Total		198	(0)

Managerial career
- 2012–2013: Sochaux
- * Club domestic league appearances and goals

Éric Hély (born 25 October 1964) is a French former professional footballer and manager. He played as a defender.

On 8 March 2012, as Sochaux caretaker manager, he began the task of keeping Ligue 1's bottom club in the top flight when they faced Evian. Hély was handed the reins until the end of the season following the sacking of Mehmed Baždarević. On 26 September 2013 he resigned, after seven games without a win.

== Managerial statistics ==
As of 26 September 2013.

Team	From	To	Record				
Team	From	To	G	W	D	L	Win %
Sochaux	8 March 2012	26 September 2013	62	20	13	29	32.26
Total			62	20	13	29	32.26
