= Patrick Gabriel =

French footballer and manager (born 1962)

Personal information
- Full name: Patrick Gabriel
- Date of birth: 18 November 1962 (age 63)
- Place of birth: Paris, France
- Position: Midfielder

Senior career*
Years	Team	Apps	(Gls)
1981–1988	Nancy	53	(2)
1988–1990	Tours	44	(4)

Managerial career
- 1990–1992: US Chantilly
- 1992–1993: Nancy B (assistant)
- 1993–1997: Nancy B
- 1997–2002: Louhans-Cuiseaux (head of youth)
- 2002–2007: Nancy B
- 2007–2012: Nancy (scout)
- 2012–2013: Nancy (head of youth)
- 2013: Nancy
- 2013–2018: Nancy (head of youth)
- 2018: Nancy
- 2018–: Nancy (head of youth)
- * Club domestic league appearances and goals

Patrick Gabriel (born 18 November 1962) is a French football manager and former midfielder.
