= René Marsiglia =

French footballer and manager (1959-2016)

Personal information
- Full name: René Marsiglia
- Date of birth: 17 September 1959
- Place of birth: Aubagne, Bouches-du-Rhône, France
- Date of death: 25 September 2016 (aged 57)
- Position: Defender

Youth career
- 1968–1972: Aubagne
- 1972–1975: Caillols

Senior career*
Years	Team	Apps	(Gls)
1975–1976	Caillols	?	(?)
1976–1978	Boulogne	33	(0)
1978–1983	Lille	148	(4)
1983–1985	Lens	83	(1)
1985–1987	Toulon	67	(2)
1987–1994	Nice	185	(5)
1994–1995	Amiens	29	(0)

Managerial career
- 1998–2000: Amiens
- 2001–2002: Cannes
- 2002–2003: Alès
- 2003–2004: Cannes
- 2010–2011: Nice (assistant)
- 2011–2012: Nice
- 2012–2013: Dubai Club
- 2013–2014: Nîmes Olympique
- * Club domestic league appearances and goals

René Marsiglia (17 September 1959 – 25 September 2016) was a football defender and most recently the manager of Nîmes Olympique. He was born in Aubagne, France.

Marsiglia was named head coach of OGC Nice on 15 November 2011. Before that, he was the assistant coach at the club. He was sacked on 21 May 2012, despite having saved Nice from relegation that year.

On 26 June 2012, Marsiglia was named head coach of the UAE side Dubai Club.

On 26 December 2013, he became the new coach of Nîmes Olympique in replacement of Victor Zvunka. He died on 25 September 2016, after a long illness.
