= AS Nancy Lorraine =

French football club

Nancy
- Full name: Association Sportive Nancy Lorraine
- Nickname: Les Chardons (The Thistles)
- Founded: 1967; 59 years ago
- Stadium: Stade Marcel Picot
- Capacity: 20,087
- Owner(s): Chien Lee; Krishen Sud
- President: Nicolas Holveck
- Head coach: Oswald Tanchot
- League: Ligue 2
- 2025–26: Ligue 2, 14th of 18
- Website: www.asnl.net
Home colours	Away colours

Association Sportive Nancy Lorraine (French pronunciation: [asɔsjɑsjɔ̃ spɔʁtiv nɑ̃si lɔʁɛn]), known as AS Nancy Lorraine, and more commonly as Nancy or ASNL, is a French football club founded in 1967 and based in Nancy, Grand Est. The club plays its home matches at the Stade Marcel Picot located in Tomblaine in the inner suburbs of Nancy, where its head office is also located. The infrastructure of the training center is located within the forest of Haye business park, in Bois-de-Haye. It currently competes in the second tier of French football, Ligue 2, from 2025–26 after being crowned champions on May 2, 2025 and securing promotion from Championnat National in 2024–25.

The club was founded in 1910 by Maurice de Vienne under the name Union sportive Frontière, then was later renamed Association Sportive Lorraine in 1928. In 1967, following the collapse of FC Nancy, the club created a professional section and as such changed its name to become Association Sportive Nancy Lorraine. The club has won 8 titles: the Coupe de France (1978), the Coupe de la Ligue (2006), five Ligue 2 champion titles (1975, 1990, 1998, 2005 and 2016) and the Championnat National title (2025). The club also has participated in three European competitions: the UEFA Cup Winners' Cup in 1979 and two appearances in the UEFA Europa League, in 2007 and 2008.

In December 2020, Chien Lee of NewCity Capital, Randy Frankel of Partners Path Capital, Paul Conway of Pacific Media Group (PMG) and Krishen Sud acquired AS Nancy Lorraine and Chien Lee became the chairman of the board, replacing Jacques Rousselot who had been in charge since 1995.

In June 2023, AS Nancy's shareholding was consolidated between two of the owners, Krishen Sud and Chien Lee, who now own almost 100% of the Club.

On August 28, 2025, the club announced that Paul Conway had been removed from AS Nancy Lorraine's Board of Directors by the shareholders. Krishen Sud and Chien Lee, who collectively own nearly 100% of the shares, have continued to oversee the management of the club since their takeover in July 2023. Paul Conway is no longer a shareholders of AS Nancy Lorraine.

ASNL is renowned as a club with a good training center. One of the club's most notable players is Michel Platini, the former president of UEFA. Platini began his career at the club in 1972, playing eight seasons with Nancy. He scored the only goal in the aforementioned Coupe de France final and won two French Player of the Year awards whilst playing with the club. Platini also established himself as a French international while at the club and went on to achieve numerous team and individual accolades after his departure from Nancy. He is considered to be, arguably, the club's greatest player ever and, upon entering the section of the club's official website showing Nancy's greats, a picture of a young Platini is displayed. Other notable players to have played for ASNL include Mustapha Hadji, winner of the African Ballon d'Or in 1998, his brother Youssouf Hadji, with more than 300 matches in the colors of the club, Olivier Rouyer and Tony Vairelles. Other players have emerged or shown great promise at the club, such as Tony Cascarino, Jean-Michel Moutier, Roger Lemerre, Aleksandr Zavarov, Bernard Zénier, Clément Lenglet, Michaël Cuisance, Amine Bassi and Neil El Aynaoui.

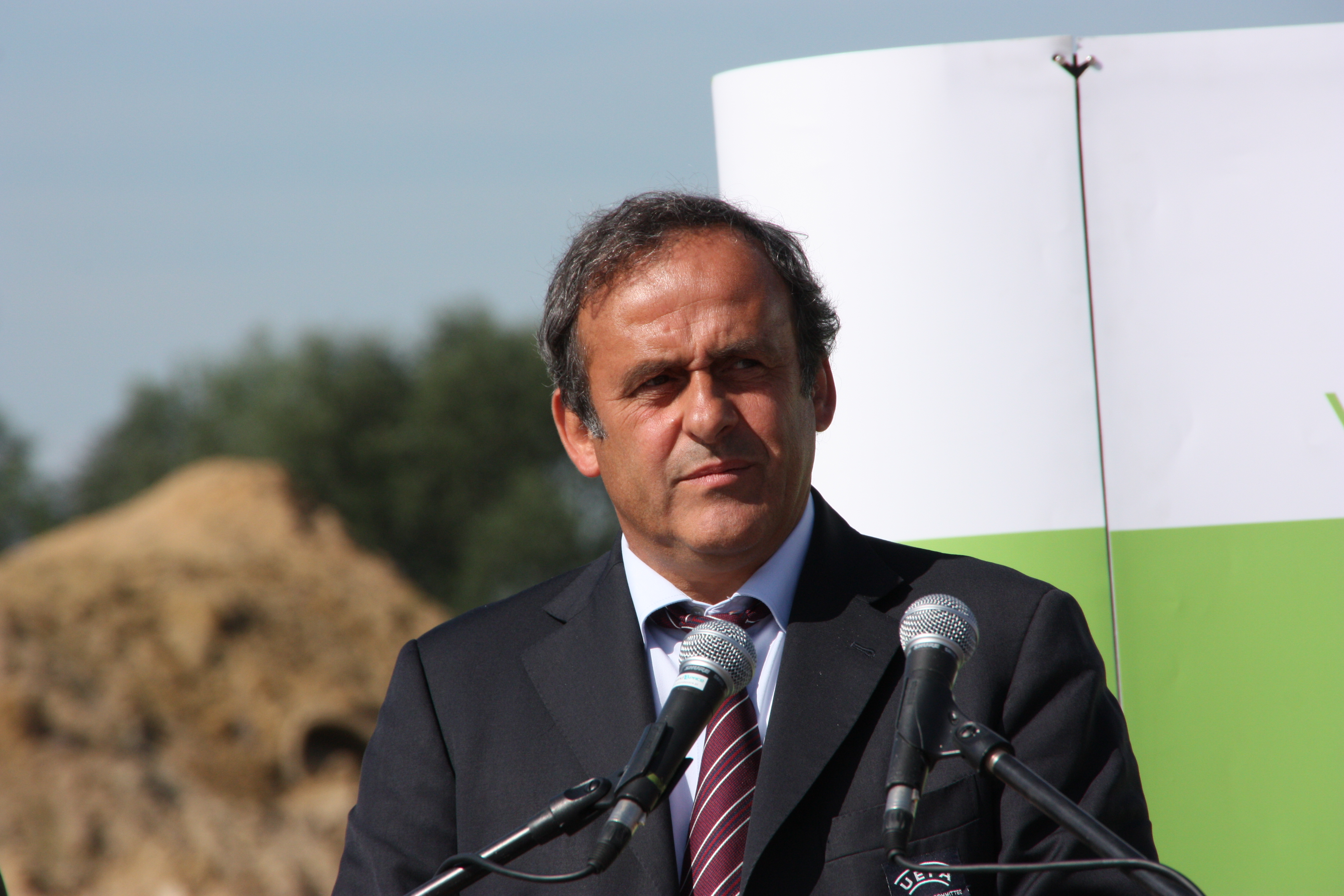
Michel Platini, the former UEFA president, spent eight seasons with the club.

== History ==
Prior to the creation of AS Nancy, the city of Nancy was host to football by FC Nancy and US Frontière. FC Nancy was formed in 1901, while US Frontière was founded in 1910. Both clubs were a part of the Ligue de Lorraine. FC Nancy continued to play football through the professional transition. The club achieved very little during its 64 years of existence only winning the second division twice in 1946 and 1958. FC Nancy did reach the final of the Coupe de France in 1953 and 1962, however, on both appearances, the club lost to Lille and Saint-Étienne, respectively. In 1965, with the club enduring financial difficulties during the 1963–64 season, mainly due to the club's being abandoned by the city's municipality and its supporters according to its president, Nancy folded shortly before the new season.

The idea of a new professional club in the city was thought of by Claude Cuny in spring 1964 based on amateur Association sportive Lorraine, formerly known as Union sportive Frontière. Cuny had previously worked with FC Nancy, but left the club prior to its destruction. Cuny is considered one of the leaders of French football mainly because of his innovative ideas and strategies. After forming Nancy, he created the first youth academy of French football. Prior to the club beginning its life as a football club, Cuny devised a strategy to immerse the club into the city's public. First, he sent out over 18,000 letters and petitions to draw interest to the team. Once the public gained notice, Cuny organised friendly matches to raise funds for the club. After accruing enough money, Cuny sought to turn the club professional, and, despite several setbacks, on 16 June 1967, Nancy were granted professional status and inserted into Division 2, the second level of French football. The club's first manager was René Pleimelding, a former French international who played for FC Nancy. Nancy, subsequently, recruited several former FC Nancy players such as Antoine Redin, as well as players from the region such as Michel Lanini, Gérard Braun and Roger Formica. In Nancy's inaugural season of football, the club finished tenth in the league table and reached the Round of 16 in the Coupe de France. Two seasons later, the club earned promotion to Division 1 and finished in 13th place in its first season in the league.

In 1972, Michel Platini arrived at the club, initially with the club's reserve team. His first full season as a player came in the 1974–75 season whilst the club was playing in the second division, having suffered relegation from Division 1 the previous season. The season was a success for both club and player: Nancy achieved its first major honour winning Division 2, while Platini appeared in 32 league matches and scored 17 goals. In the ensuing three seasons in Division 1, Nancy, led by Platini, Jean-Michel Moutier, Carlos Curbelo, Paco Rubio and Philippe Jeannol, finished in the top ten. Platini won the French Player of the Year award in two of those seasons. In 1978, Nancy achieved its highest honour to date after winning the Coupe de France. In the final, the club faced Nice and defeated its southern foes 1–0 with Platini scoring the lone goal. President Valéry Giscard d'Estaing presented Platini with the trophy to cap off the victory. Nancy's Coupe de France triumph saw the club qualify for European competition for the first time in its short history. The club participated in the 1978–79 edition of the European Cup Winners' Cup and were eliminated in the second round after losing 4–3 on aggregate to Swiss club Servette. The club played most of the season without Platini who was injured.

Platini left the club after the season, however most of the club's nucleus remained. In the team's first season without Platini, Nancy finished in 11th place. In the next three seasons, Nancy finished in the top ten. After the 1984 season, Moutier and Rubio became the last of the club's influential players to depart and Nancy suffered a free-fall finishing in the next three seasons. The implosion concluded after the 1986–87 season when Nancy finished in 19th place, thus falling back to Division 2. The only ray of sunshine for the club during this declining stint was the testimonial match held for Platini on 23 May 1988 following the players' club and international retirement. That evening, fans were treated to an exhibition that featured Platini, Pelé and Diego Maradona.

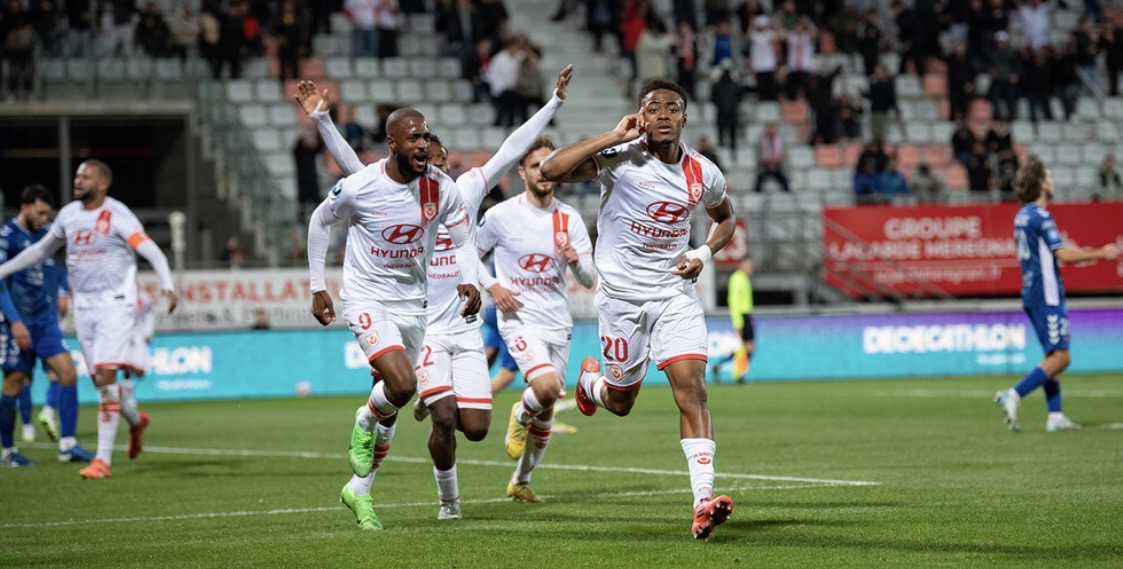
Nancy players celebrate a goal in the home match against Le Mans FC.

In the 1988–89 season, Nancy earned promotion back to the first division. However, the club spent the entire decade rotating between Division 1 and Division 2. The club won two second-division titles during this stint and finally earned promotion back to the first division, now called Ligue 1, for the 2005–06 season after winning Ligue 2. In Nancy's first season back in Ligue 1, the club won the Coupe de la Ligue defeating Nice 2–1 in the final.

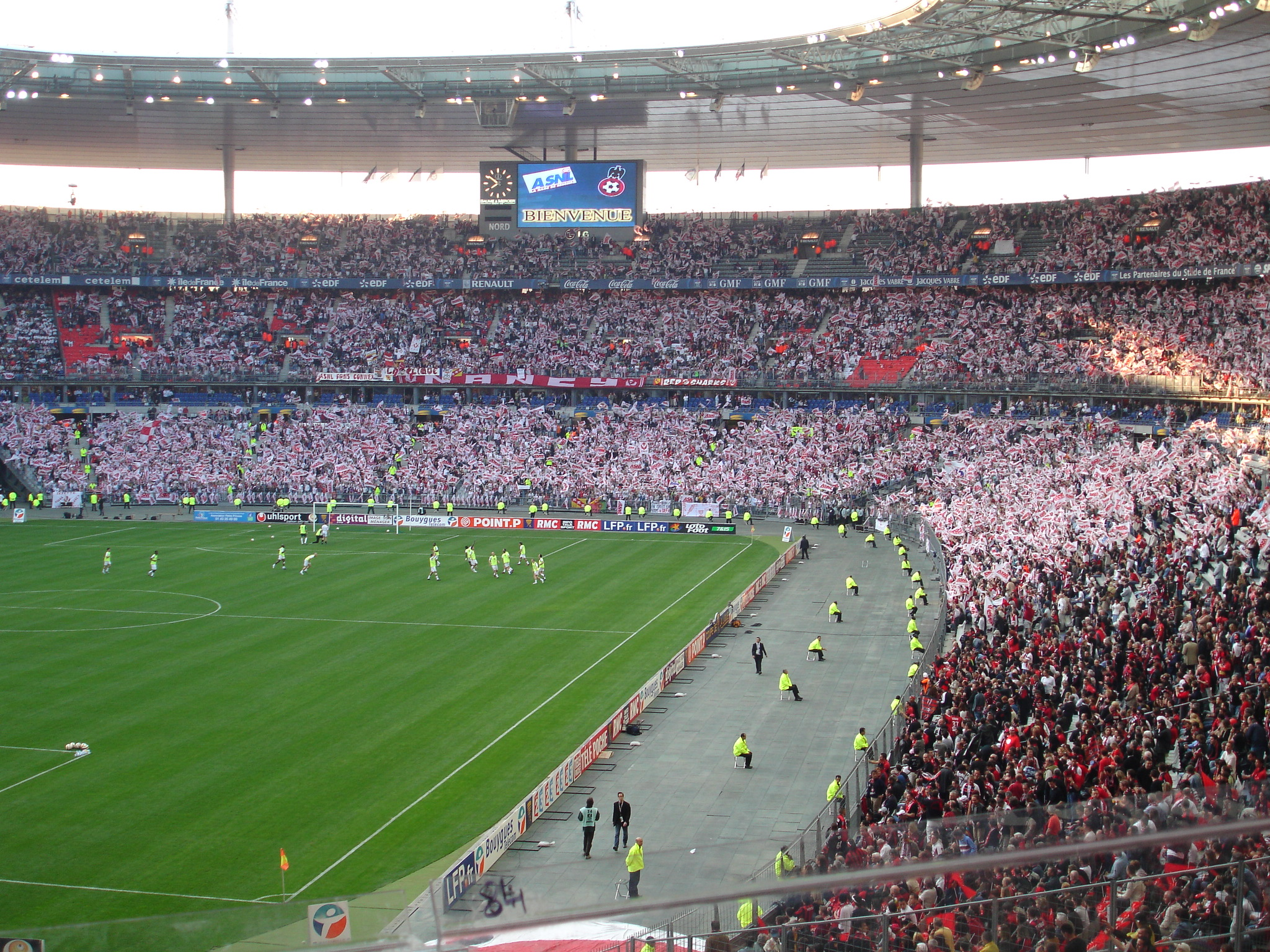
40.000 fans of Nancy in Stade de France during the 2006 Coupe de la Ligue final, in which Nancy won the title.

Nancy supporters arrived at the Stade de France courtesy of 11 special trains, while more than 300 buses and thousands of cars from the city also arrived in Paris. The cup victory allowed Nancy to participate in the UEFA Cup with the club eventually making it to the Round of 32 before losing to Shakhtar Donetsk. The first half of the 2007–08 season for Nancy was the club's best ever start to a season in the top division with 35 points after 19 games and sitting in second place. On 4 November 2007, in a match against Bordeaux, the club celebrated its 40th anniversary of existence with a special event involving many of the club's former players, club officials, presidents, and coaches. After a good second half start, Nancy sat in third place on the final match day of the season. However, the club finished one spot short of qualifying for the UEFA Champions League, losing 3–2 to Rennes, while fourth-placed Marseille defeated Strasbourg 4–3 to claim the spot. Nancy still managed to claim the league's best defence, alongside Nice. The 30 goals conceded equalled the club's record achieved in the 1976–77 season. After managing mid-table performances during the following 4 years at the top-flight, the club got relegated in May 2013, finishing only 2 points behind 17th place Ajaccio.

Following their relegation, the club nearly got promoted back to the first division, finishing 4th and 3 points shy behind Caen and a spot to the top-flight. Nancy remained a strong candidate for promotion during the entire 2014–15 season, but ultimately finished 5th, 6 points behind 3rd place Angers.

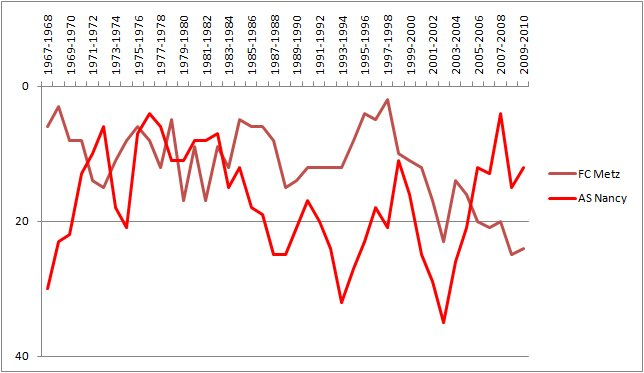
Season by season ranking of ASNL and FC Metz

AS Nancy is the rival of Metz, a city in Lorraine. The match between the two teams is one of the most dangerous encounters in the French football, often classified at the highest level of risk matches because of clashes between supporters of the two camps. This match is a regional derby for the supremacy of a city.

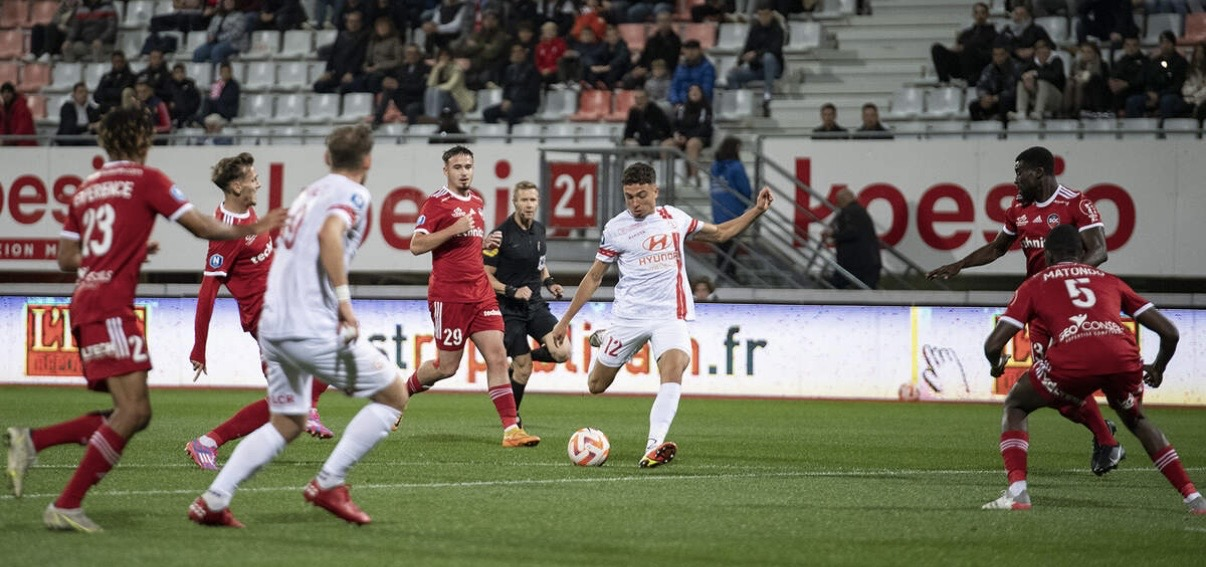
Neil El Aynaoui played for AS Nancy at the home game in September 2022 at the Stade Marcel-Picot stadium.

In 2009, Neil El Aynaoui joined the youth academy of Nancy at the age of eight. He signed his first professional contract with the club on 3 June 2021 and was sold to RC Lens for just €600,000 in the summer of 2023. in July 2025, El Aynaoui moved to AS Roma in Italy in a €25 million deal on a five-year contract.

The following year, the club still was a strong candidate for promotion. Finally, on 25 April 2016, after 3 years of absence, the club assured promotion to Ligue 1 with 3 games to spare by beating Sochaux 1–0 on match day 35. On match day 37, they beat Evian 1–0 to clinch the Ligue 2 title, their fifth second division crown after 1975, 1990, 1998 and 2005.

The following season, 2016–17, the club finished in 19th place, and were relegated to the Ligue 2 after one season. They remained in that division until 2022, being relegated to the Championnat National for the first time in club history.

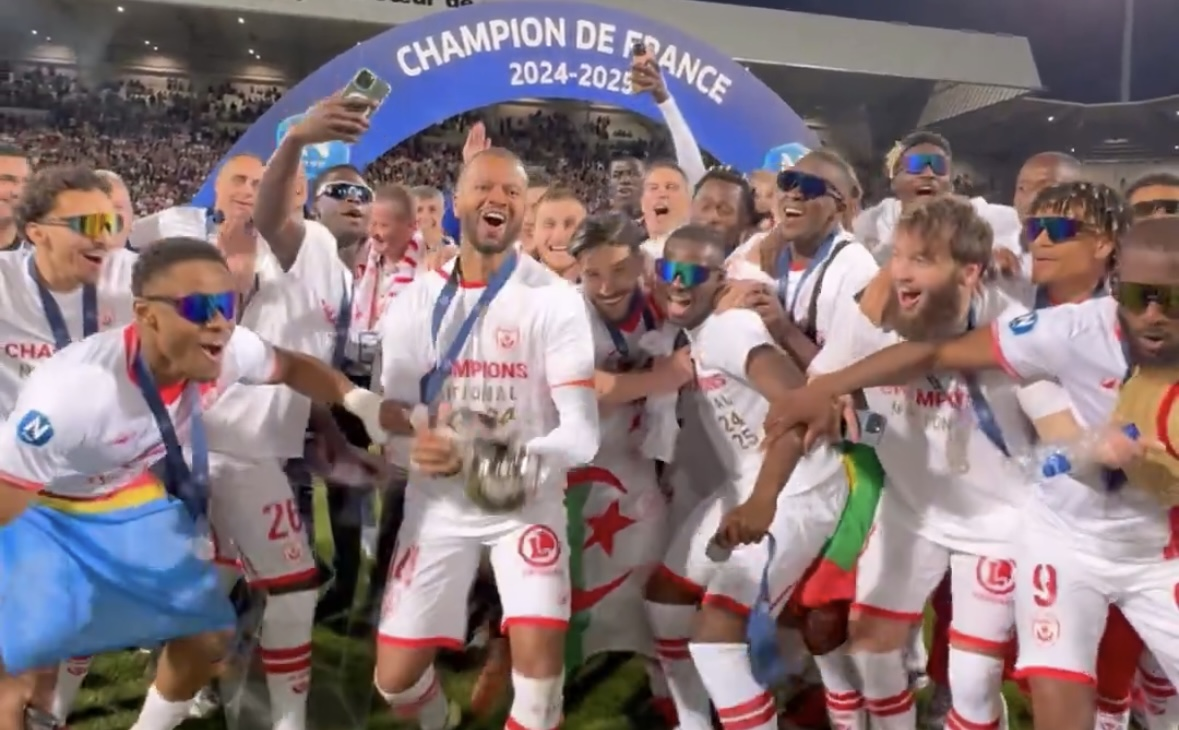
AS Nancy Lorraine crowned champions and secure promotion to Ligue 2 on May 2, 2025.

On May 2, 2025, Nancy crowned champions and secure promotion to Ligue 2 from next season after defeat Nîmes Olympique with narrowly 1-0 a goal winning by Teddy Bouriaud in 53rd minute, ended three years in third tier and return to second tier after three years absence.

== Home Stadium ==
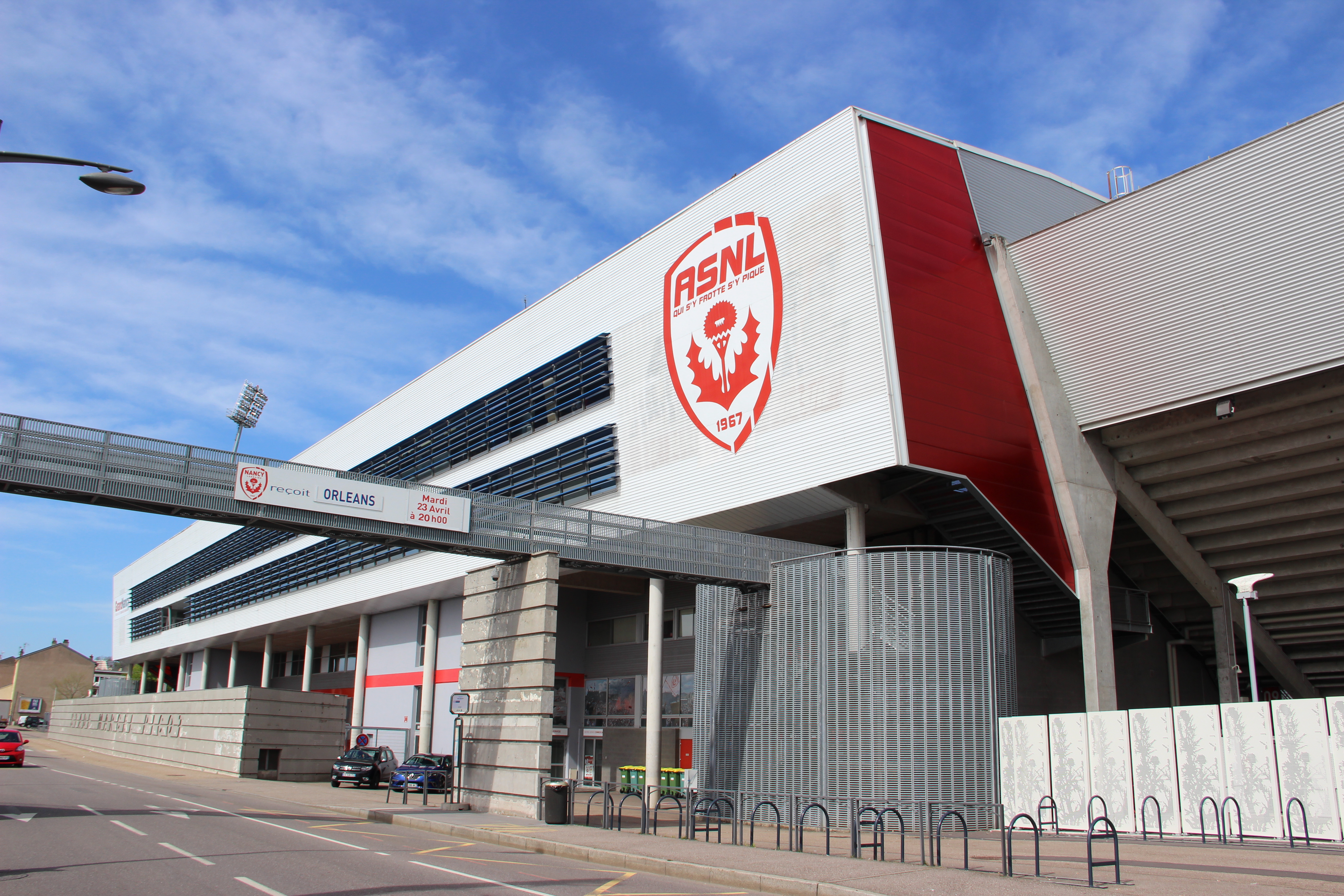
External view of AS Nancy Lorraine Home Stadium Stade Marcel-Picot.

Opened on August 8, 1926, the Stadium originally known as the University Stadium or Essey Bridge Sports Park, was originally intended for the Lorrain University Stadium. Fully devoted to the cause of FC Nancy, Marcel Picot, a hatter installed in the 1930s in the city centre, will become president of the club and leave his name to the compound. The complete renovation of the Marcel Picot stadium, led by the Bernt-Morillon-Thouveny agency on behalf of the Urban Community, took place between 1999 and 2003. It increased the capacity of the stadium to 20,087 seats and covered. Another expansion project is planned, bringing the stadium's capacity to 32,000 seats.

== Players ==
=== Current squad ===
As of 7 September 2026

Note: Flags indicate national team as defined under FIFA eligibility rules; some limited exceptions apply. Players may hold more than one non-FIFA nationality.

No.	Pos.	Nation	Player
1	GK	FRA	Enzo Basilio
2	DF	FRA	Héliohdino Tavares
4	DF	CGO	Nehemiah Fernandez
5	FW	SEN	Pape Meïssa Ba
6	MF	FRA	Kouroufia Kébé
7	MF	FRA	Zakaria Fdaouch
8	FW	FRA	Walid Bouabdeli
9	FW	MAR	Ilyes Housni
10	FW	FRA	Adrian Dabasse
11	MF	FRA	Sidi Cissé
12	FW	MAD	El Hadary Raheriniaina (on loan from Paris FC)
14	DF	GLP	Nicolas Saint-Ruf
17	MF	MTN	Mamadou Fofana
18	MF	FRA	Hugo Barbier
19	DF	FRA	Thierno Baldé

No.	Pos.	Nation	Player
21	DF	GBS	Elydjah Mendy
22	DF	BEL	Logan Ndenbe
24	MF	ALG	Yanis Delaveau
25	MF	FRA	Jérémy Gelin
26	MF	FRA	Zakaria Ztouti
28	MF	ALG	Issam Bouaoune
29	FW	FRA	Noam Obougou (on loan from Le Havre)
30	GK	CAF	Geoffrey Lembet
40	GK	MAR	Yanis Kouini
44	DF	FRA	Enzo Tacafred
45	MF	FRA	Chafik El Hansar
60	GK	FRA	Kenzo Noël
70	FW	MAR	Nordine Kandil
77	DF	FRA	Yannis Nahounou
88	MF	FRA	Joël-Emmanuel Coulibaly

=== Out on loan ===
Note: Flags indicate national team as defined under FIFA eligibility rules; some limited exceptions apply. Players may hold more than one non-FIFA nationality.

No. / Pos. / Nation / Player; — / MF / FRA / Youssouf Tandia (at SAS Épinal until 30 June 2027)	No. / Pos. / Nation / Player; — / FW / FRA / Mattheo Guendez (at Paris 13 Atletico until 30 June 2027)

=== Notable former players ===
Below are the notable former players who have represented Nancy in league and international competition since the club's foundation in 1967. To appear in the section below, a player must have played in at least 100 official matches for the club.

For a complete list of Nancy players, see Category:AS Nancy Lorraine players

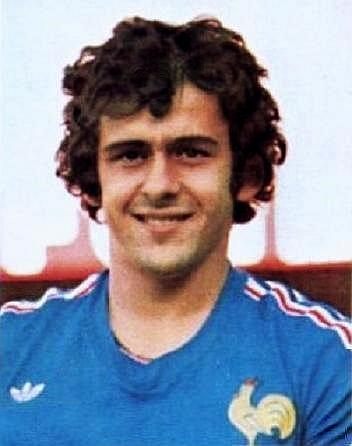
Michel Platini

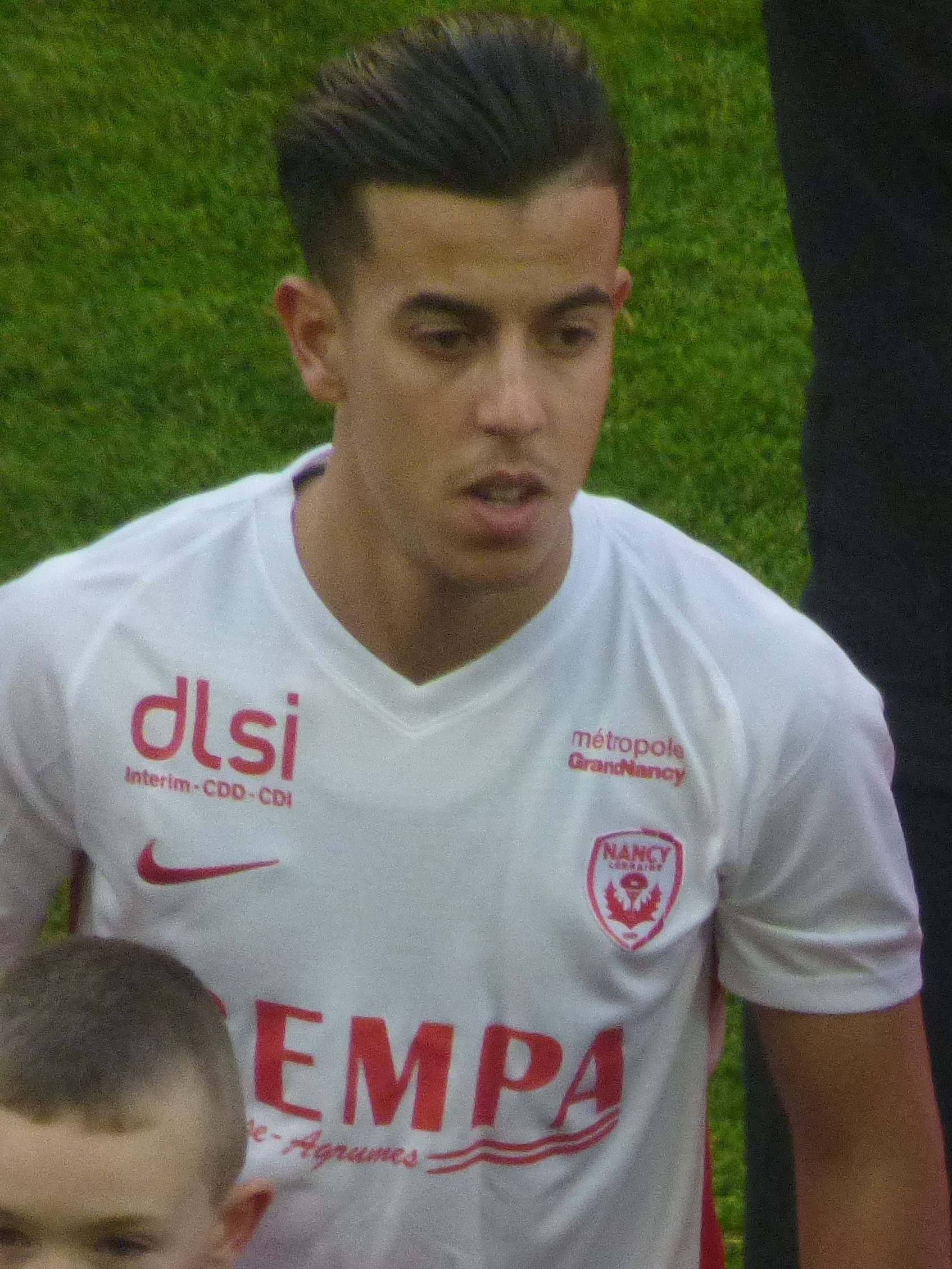
Amine Bassi

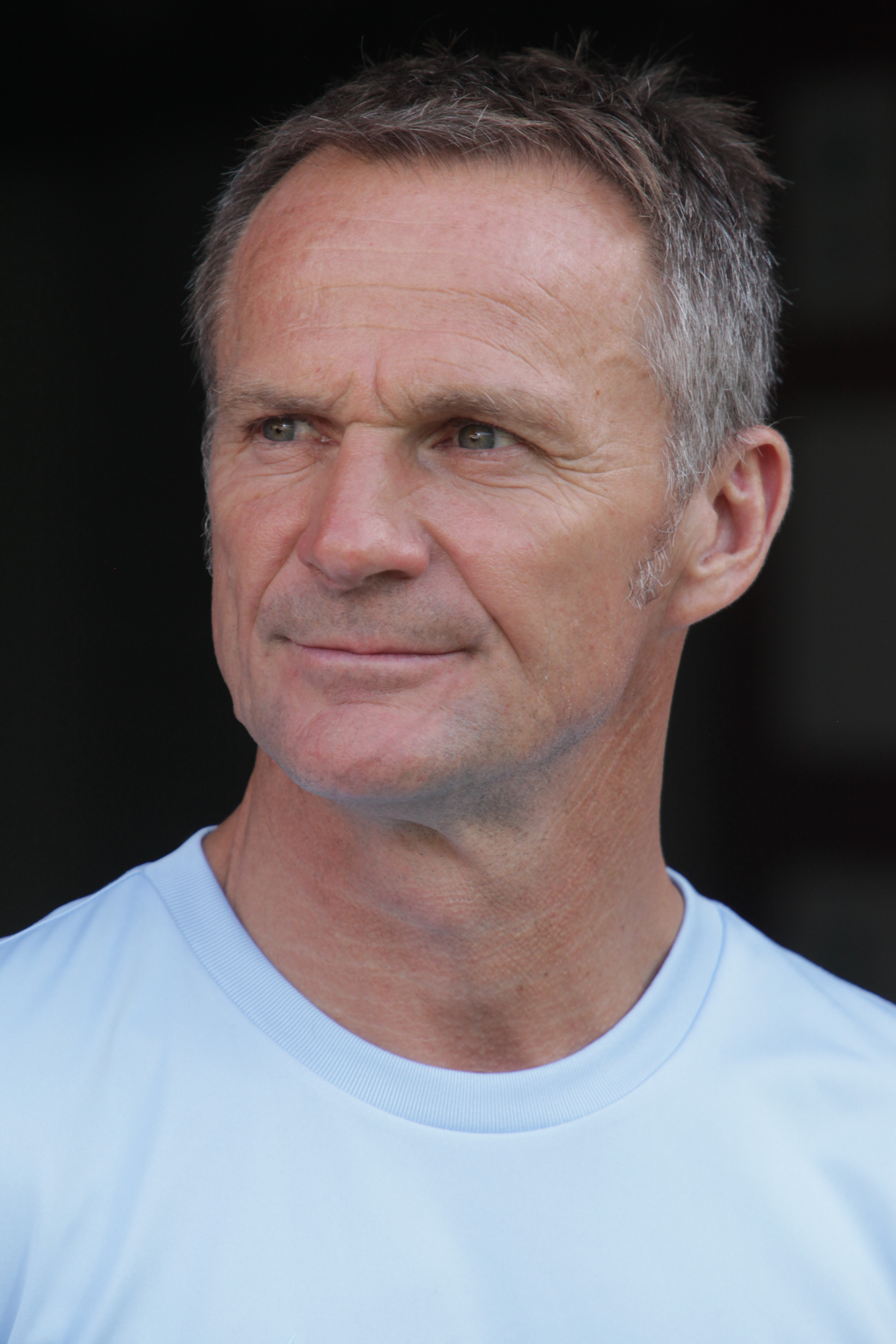
Albert Cartier

- (France) Éric Bertrand
- (France) Frédéric Biancalani
- (France) Stéphane Capiaux
- (France) Bernard Caron
- (France) Albert Cartier
- (France) Didier Casini
- (France) Jean-Claude Cloët
- (France) Carlos Curbelo
- (France) Gaston Curbelo
- (France) Paul Fischer
- (France) Neil El Aynaoui
- (France) Roger Formica
- (France) Charles Gasperini
- (France) Franck Gava
- (France) Bruno Germain
- (France) Massadio Haïdara
- (France) Vincent Hognon
- (France) Philippe Jeannol
- (France) Cédric Lécluse
- (France) Éric Martin
- (France) Sylvain Matrisciano
- (France) Laurent Moracchini
- (France) Youssef Moustaid
- (France) Jean-Michel Moutier
- (France) Pierre Neubert
- (France) Amine Bassi
- (France) Benjamin Nicaise
- (France) Jean Palka
- (France) Jacky Perdrieau
- (France) Didier Philippe
- (France) Michel Platini
- (France) Sébastien Puygrenier
- (France) Éric Rabésandratana
- (France) Jean-Pierre Raczynski
- (France) Olivier Rambo
- (France) Olivier Rouyer
- (France) Paco Rubio
- (France) Tony Vairelles
- (Brazil) André Luiz
- (Comoros) Djamel Bakar
- (Morocco) Mustapha Hadji
- (Morocco) Youssef Hadji
- (Morocco) Monsef Zerka
- (Poland) Ryszard Tarasiewicz
- (Republic of Ireland) Tony Cascarino
- (Senegal) Issiar Dia
- (Senegal) Pape Diakhaté
- (Soviet Union) (Ukraine) Oleksandr Zavarov
- (Uruguay) Pablo Correa
- (Uruguay) Rubén Umpiérrez

== Club officials ==
- Chairman: Chien Lee
- President: Krishen Sud
- General Secretary: Pascal Rivière
- Manager: Pablo Correa

=== Managerial history ===
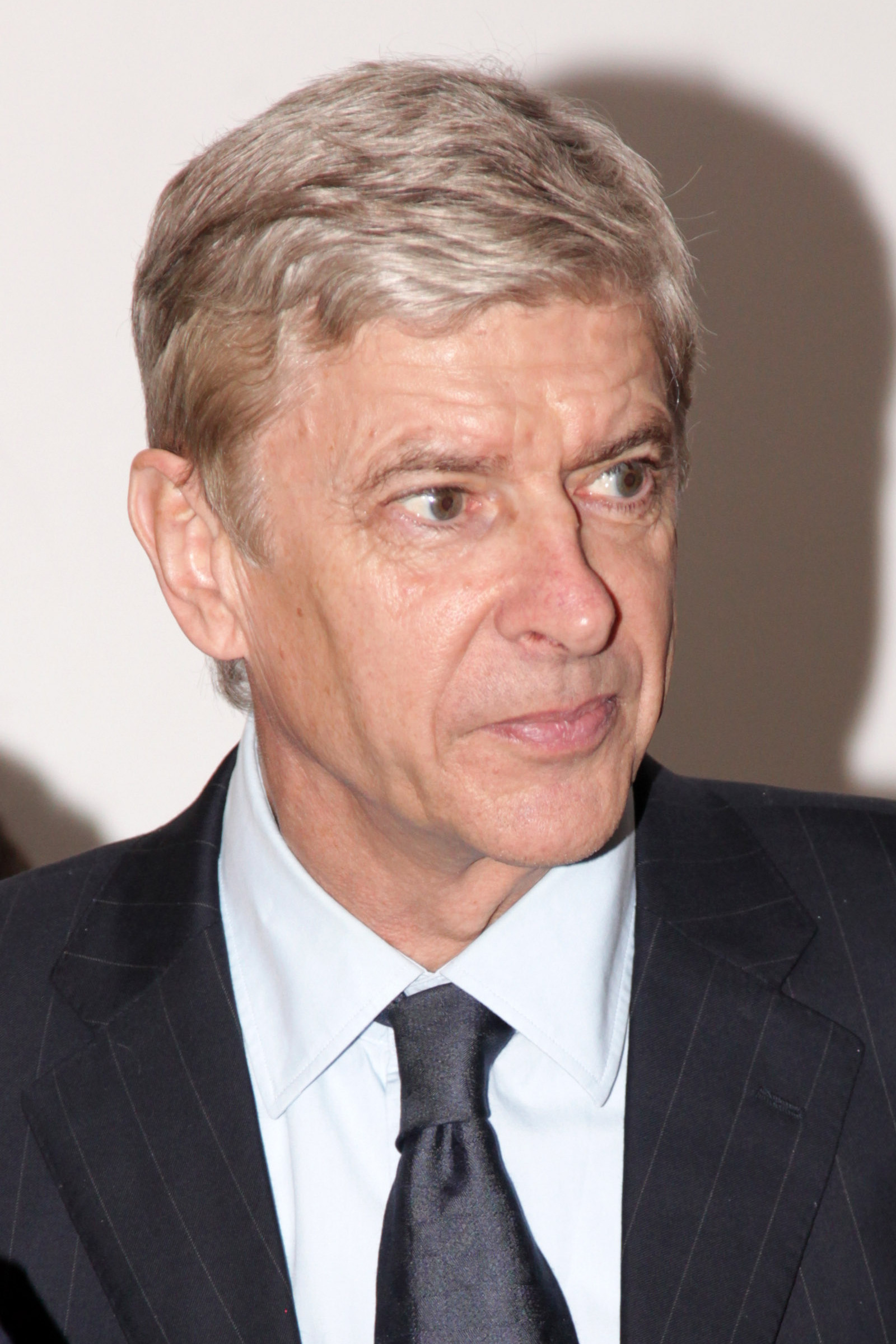
Arsène Wenger was Nancy Manager from 1984 to 1987

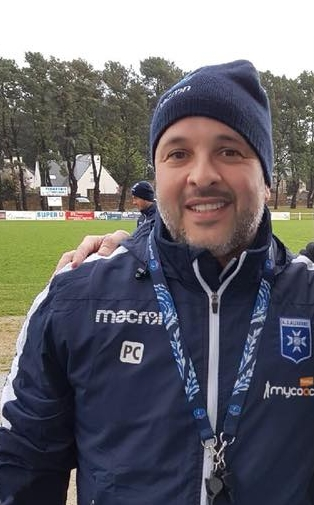
Pablo Correa

Dates	Name	Notes
1967–70	René Pleimelding	Nancy's first official coach.
1970–79	Antoine Redin	Led the club to the first division and won the Coupe de France
1979–82	Georges Huart	
1982–84	Hervé Collot	
1984–87	Arsène Wenger	
1987–90	Robert Dewilder	
1990–91	Aimé Jacquet	
July 1991 – Oct 91	Marcel Husson	
Oct 1991 – June 94	Olivier Rouyer	
July 1994 – June 00	László Bölöni	First manager outside France to coach the team.
July 2000 – 3 June	Francis Smerecki	
July 2002 – 2 Nov	Moussa Bezaz	
Nov 2002 – 11 June	Pablo Correa	Led the club back to Ligue 1 and won the Coupe de la Ligue
June 2011 – 13 Jan	Jean Fernandez	Drove the club into relegation standing. Left in the winter as a free agent, unable to lead the team out of a losing spiral.
Jan 2013 – 13 Oct	Patrick Gabriel	
Oct 2013 – 17 Aug	Pablo Correa	
Aug 2017 – 18 Jan	Vincent Hognon	
Jan 2018 – 18 Apr	Patrick Gabriel	
Apr 2018 – 18 Oct	Didier Tholot	
Oct 2018 – May 2019	Alain Perrin	
May 2019 – May 2021	Jean-Louis Garcia	
May 2021 – Sep 2021	Daniel Stendel	
Sep 2021 – Jan 2022	Benoît Pedretti	Caretaker manager
Jan 2022 – Nov 2023	Albert Cartier	
Nov 2023 - Present	Pablo Correa	

== Honours ==
=== Domestic ===
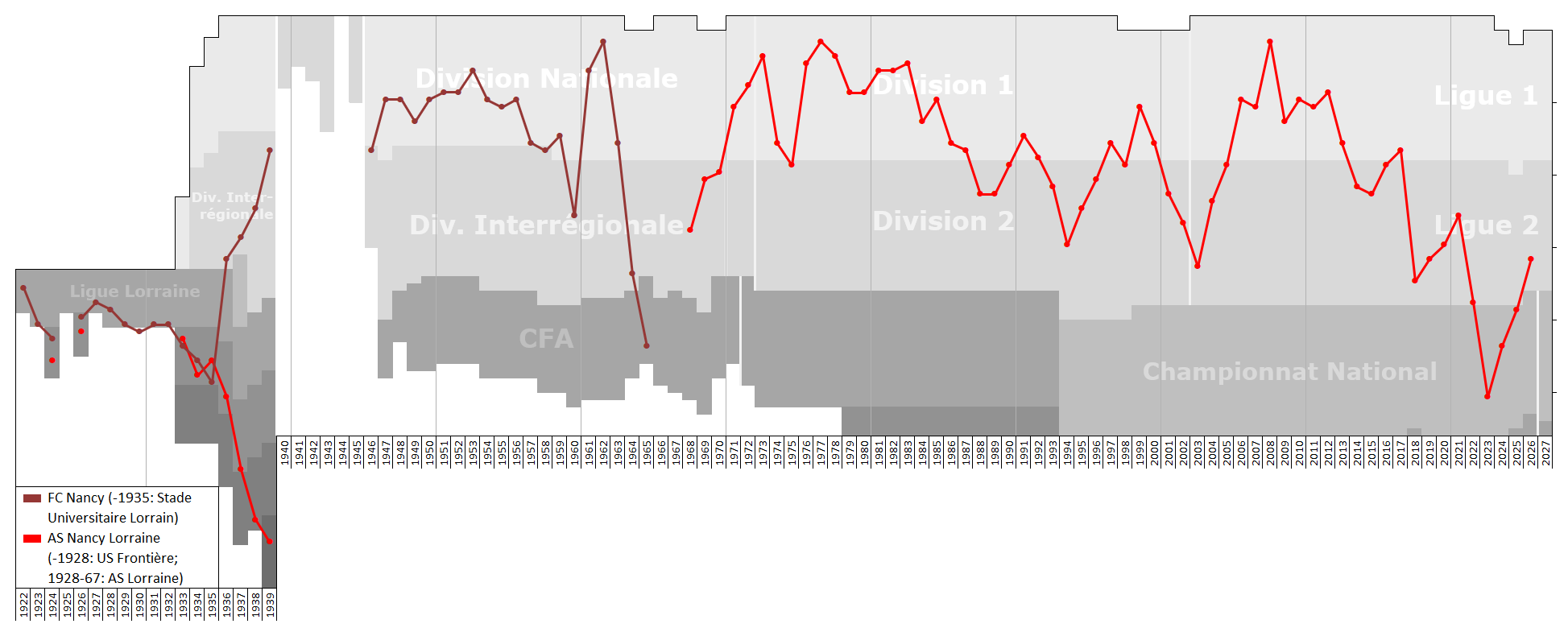
Historical league performance chart of AS Nancy Lorraine

- Coupe de France
  - Winners: 1977–78
- Coupe de la Ligue
  - Winners: 2005–06
- Ligue 2
  - Champions (5): 1974–75, 1989–90, 1997–98, 2004–05, 2015–16
- Coupe Gambardella
  - Runners-up: 1973–74
- Championnat National
  - Champions: 2024-25
