= 2012–13 Ligue 2 =

74th season of the second-tier football league in France

Ligue 2
- Season: 2012–13
- Champions: Monaco
- Promoted: Monaco; Guingamp; Nantes
- Relegated: Le Mans; Sedan; Gazélec Ajaccio
- Matches: 380
- Goals: 917 (2.41 per match)
- Top goalscorer: Mustapha Yatabaré (23 goals)
- Biggest home win: Guingamp 7–0 Lens (10 May 2013)
- Biggest away win: Lens 0–4 Monaco (21 September 2012); Istres 0–4 Caen (5 October 2012); Châteauroux 0–4 Nantes (15 April 2013)
- Highest scoring: Guingamp 4–3 Auxerre (22 September 2012); Lens 4–3 Châteauroux (15 February 2013); Guingamp 6–1 Le Mans (19 April 2013); Guingamp 7–0 Lens (10 May 2013)
- Longest winning run: 5 games Monaco (4 February – 1 March)
- Longest unbeaten run: 17 games Monaco (14 December – 29 April)
- Longest winless run: 13 games Gazélec Ajaccio (18 January – 19 April)
- Longest losing run: 8 games Gazélec Ajaccio (18 January – 9 March)
- Highest attendance: 36,471 – Nantes 1–1 Monaco (30 March 2013)
- Lowest attendance: 1,383 – Gazélec Ajaccio; 3–1 Laval (14 December 2012)
- Average attendance: 7,026

The 2012–13 Ligue 2 season was the 74th season since its establishment. The league schedule was announced in April 2012 and the fixtures were determined on 30 May. The season began on 27 July and ended on 24 May 2013. The winter break was in effect from 22 December to 12 January 2013. In addition, German sportswear company Uhlsport became the official provider of match balls for the season after agreeing to a long-term partnership with the Ligue de Football Professionnel.

== Teams ==
There were three promoted teams from the Championnat National, replacing the three teams that were relegated from Ligue 2 following the 2011–12 season. A total of 20 teams are currently competing in the league with three clubs suffering relegation to the third division, Championnat National. All clubs that secured Ligue 2 status for the season were subject to approval by the DNCG before becoming eligible to participate.

Auxerre was the first club to suffer relegation to Ligue 2 in the 2011–12 Ligue 1 season. The club's drop was confirmed on 13 May 2012 following the team's 3–0 loss to Marseille; a defeat that made it impossible for the club to finish safe. Auxerre returned to the second division after 32 consecutive years playing in Ligue 1. Prior to the 2011–12 season, the club had never suffered relegation from the country's top division. On the final day of the 2011–12 Ligue 1 season, Dijon and Caen were both relegated to Ligue 2 following defeats to Rennes and Valenciennes, respectively. Dijon returned to the second division after only one season in Ligue 1, while Caen fell to the second-tier after two years in the first division.

On 18 May 2012, both Nîmes and Gazélec Ajaccio were promoted to Ligue 2 after each club achieved results that made it impossible for the league's fourth-placed team to surpass them. Nîmes returned to the second division after only one year at semi-professional level, while Gazélec will play in Ligue 2 for the first time since the 1992–93 season. On the final day of the 2011–12 National season, Niort became the final club to earn promotion to Ligue 2 after beating already-promoted Gazélec Ajaccio 1–0. Niort returned to the second division for the first time since the 2007–08 season.

=== DNCG rulings ===
On 11 July 2012, following a preliminary review of each club's administrative and financial accounts in Ligue 2, the DNCG ruled that Le Mans would be relegated to the Championnat National. Following the announcement, Le Mans president Henri Legarda announced that the club would appeal the decision stating the "shareholders will play their part and the club will go after every possible step to restore its rightful place in the sport." On 25 July, Le Mans confirmed on its official website that the DNCG had reversed it decision to relegate the club.

=== Stadia and locations ===
Location of teams in 2012–13 Ligue 2

Club	Location	Venue	Capacity	Av. Att.
Angers	Angers	Stade Jean Bouin	17,100	6,850
Arles-Avignon	Avignon	Parc des Sports	17,518	1,968
Auxerre	Auxerre	Stade de l'Abbé-Deschamps	24,493	5,789
Caen	Caen	Stade Michel d'Ornano	21,500	10,129
Châteauroux	Châteauroux	Stade Gaston Petit	17,173	5,416
Clermont	Clermont-Ferrand	Stade Gabriel Montpied	10,363	4,069
Dijon	Dijon	Stade Gaston Gérard	15,998	8,321
Gazélec Ajaccio	Ajaccio	Stade Ange Casanova	5,000	2,471
Guingamp	Guingamp	Stade du Roudourou	18,126	9,507
Istres	Istres	Stade Parsemain	17,468	2,024
Laval	Laval	Stade Francis Le Basser	18,739	4,424
Le Havre	Le Havre	Stade Océane	25,000	8,397
Le Mans	Le Mans	MMArena	25,000	6,029
Lens	Lens	Stade Félix-Bollaert	41,233	16,179
AS Monaco	Monaco	Stade Louis II	18,500	5,293
Nantes	Nantes	Stade de la Beaujoire	38,285	18,171
Nîmes	Nîmes	Stade des Costières	18,482	5,509
Niort	Niort	Stade René Gaillard	10,898	4,572
Sedan	Sedan	Stade Louis Dugauguez	23,189	5,530
Tours	Tours	Stade de la Vallée du Cher	13,500	4,059

=== Personnel and kits ===
Note: Flags indicate national team as has been defined under FIFA eligibility rules. Players and managers may hold more than one non-FIFA nationality.

Team	Manager^{1}	Captain^{1}	Kit Manufacturer^{1}	Main Sponsor^{1}
Angers	Stéphane Moulin	Grégory Malicki	Umbro	Scania
Arles-Avignon	Noël Tosi	Ludovic Butelle	Uhlsport	Groupe Nicollin
Auxerre	Bernard Casoni	Adama Coulibaly	Airness	Maisons Pierre
Caen	Patrice Garande	Jérémy Sorbon	Nike	GDE Recyclage
Châteauroux	Didier Tholot	Massamba Sambou	Nike	Le Seyec
Clermont	Régis Brouard	Jean-François Rivière	Patrick Sport	Crédit Mutuel
Dijon	Olivier Dall'Oglio	Cédric Varrault	Nike	Doras, IPS
Gazélec Ajaccio	Thierry Laurey	Louis Poggi	Adidas	Carrefour, Casino d'Ajaccio
Guingamp	Jocelyn Gourvennec	Lionel Mathis	Patrick Sport	Groupe Stalaven
Istres	José Pasqualetti	Nassim Akrour	Duarig	Trust 2 Cloud
Laval	Philippe Hinschberger	Fabrice Levrat	Duarig	Lactel
Le Havre	Erick Mombaerts	Julien François	Nike	System U
Le Mans	Régis Beunardeau	Frédéric Thomas	Macron	LOUÉ
Lens	Éric Sikora	Yohan Demont	adidas	Invicta
AS Monaco	Claudio Ranieri	Andreas Wolf	Macron	Fedcom
Nantes	Michel Der Zakarian	Olivier Veigneau	Erreà	Offset 5
Nîmes	Victor Zvunka	Benoît Poulain	Erreà	Mac Dan
Niort	Pascal Gastien	Johan Letzelter	Puma	Restaurant Le Billon (home), Cheminées Poujoulat (away)
Sedan	Laurent Guyot	Mamadou Diallo	Nike	Invicta
Tours	Bernard Blaquart	Julien Cardy	Duarig	Invicta

^{1}Subject to change during the season.

=== Managerial changes ===
Team	Outgoing head coach	Manner of departure	Date of vacancy	Position in table	Incoming head coach	Date of appointment	Position in table
AS Monaco	Marco Simone	Sacked	19 May 2012	Off-season	Claudio Ranieri	30 May 2012	Off-season
Dijon	Patrice Carteron	Mutual consent	24 May 2012	Off-season	Olivier Dall'Oglio	1 June 2012	Off-season
Nîmes	Thierry Froger	End of contract	25 May 2012	Off-season	Victor Zvunka	1 June 2012	Off-season
Nantes	Landry Chauvin	Joined Brest	31 May 2012	Off-season	Michel Der Zakarian	1 June 2012	Off-season
Clermont	Michel Der Zakarian	Resigned	30 May 2012	Off-season	Régis Brouard	7 June 2012	Off-season
Caen	Franck Dumas	Resigned	13 June 2012	Off-season	Patrice Garande	18 June 2012	Off-season
Gazélec Ajaccio	Dominique Veilex	Mutual consent	1 August 2012	15th	Jean-Michel Cavalli	6 August 2012	18th
Tours	Peter Zeidler	Sacked	21 August 2012	20th	Bernard Blaquart	21 August 2012	20th
Lens	Jean-Louis Garcia	Sacked	24 September 2012	15th	Éric Sikora	24 September 2012	15th
Arles-Avignon	Thierry Laurey	Sacked	3 November 2012	18th	Pierre Mosca (interim)	3 November 2012	18th
Le Havre	Cédric Daury	Sacked	12 November 2012	16th	Erick Mombaerts	21 December 2012	9th
Auxerre	Jean-Guy Wallemme	Mutual consent	2 December 2012	15th	Bernard Casoni	3 December 2012	15th
Arles-Avignon	Pierre Mosca (interim)	End of interim spell	11 February 2013	17th	Noël Tosi	11 February 2013	17th
Gazélec Ajaccio	Jean-Michel Cavalli	Sacked	15 February 2013	19th	Thierry Laurey	19 February 2013	19th
Le Mans	Denis Zanko	Sacked	24 April 2013	18th	Régis Beunardeau	24 April 2013	18th

== League table ==
Pos	Team	Pld	W	D	L	GF	GA	GD	Pts	Promotion or Relegation
1	Monaco (C, P)	38	21	13	4	64	33	+31	76	Promotion to Ligue 1
2	Guingamp (P)	38	20	10	8	63	38	+25	70	Promotion to Ligue 1
3	Nantes (P)	38	19	12	7	54	29	+25	69	Promotion to Ligue 1
4	Caen	38	17	12	9	48	28	+20	63	
5	Angers	38	17	10	11	52	39	+13	61	
6	Le Havre	38	16	11	11	52	47	+5	59	
7	Dijon	38	15	14	9	52	49	+3	59	
8	Nîmes	38	17	7	14	52	42	+10	58	
9	Auxerre	38	13	10	15	51	53	−2	49	
10	Tours	38	12	13	13	40	49	−9	49	
11	Arles-Avignon	38	10	16	12	36	48	−12	46	
12	Lens	38	9	18	11	39	53	−14	45	
13	Istres	38	11	10	17	38	45	−7	43	
14	Clermont	38	9	16	13	33	47	−14	43	
15	Niort	38	8	18	12	39	42	−3	42	
16	Châteauroux	38	8	18	12	43	47	−4	42	
17	Laval	38	10	12	16	47	54	−7	42	
18	Le Mans (D, R)	38	11	7	20	39	62	−23	40	Voluntary relegation to the Regional 1
19	Sedan (D, R)	38	6	13	19	41	58	−17	28	Voluntary relegation to CFA 2
20	Gazélec Ajaccio (R)	38	6	10	22	34	54	−20	25	Relegation to Championnat National

Source: Ligue 2
Rules for classification: 1) points; 2) goal difference; 3) number of goals scored.
(C) Champions; (D) Disqualified; (P) Promoted; (R) Relegated

== Results ==
Home \ Away	ANG	ACAA	AUX	CAE	CHA	CLR	DIJ	GAZ	GUI	IST	LVL	LHA	MFC	RCL	ASM	NAN	NMS	NRT	SED	TOU
Angers		2–0	2–1	1–1	1–0	1–2	3–3	1–0	1–2	0–1	1–0	3–1	4–0	3–2	1–2	2–0	0–0	0–0	1–0	0–1
Arles-Avignon	2–0		2–1	0–2	1–1	0–2	1–1	1–0	0–2	1–0	0–3	1–1	0–0	0–0	0–2	2–1	1–1	0–1	2–2	2–2
Auxerre	2–2	2–1		1–2	0–0	1–1	0–0	1–1	2–1	0–0	2–1	4–1	1–1	1–2	0–2	0–2	2–0	4–2	1–0	3–2
Caen	1–0	1–1	3–1		1–0	4–0	2–2	2–1	1–2	1–0	2–1	2–0	0–2	0–0	3–0	0–1	1–0	0–1	2–0	0–1
Châteauroux	2–3	2–0	1–1	2–2		0–0	2–2	3–1	3–1	2–0	1–1	1–1	1–0	1–1	1–1	0–4	2–1	1–0	1–1	3–0
Clermont	1–2	2–4	1–2	0–0	1–0		0–0	0–2	1–2	2–1	0–0	1–1	1–1	1–0	0–1	0–1	2–1	1–1	0–2	1–1
Dijon	0–0	2–3	0–1	1–0	1–1	1–1		2–1	1–0	3–1	1–0	2–2	3–0	2–1	0–2	3–1	2–1	1–1	4–2	1–0
Gazélec Ajaccio	0–1	1–1	0–0	0–0	1–1	0–1	0–2		0–1	3–2	3–1	0–1	1–3	1–1	0–1	3–1	2–3	2–2	1–1	0–1
Guingamp	2–1	0–0	4–3	1–0	2–1	0–0	2–0	0–0		1–0	1–1	3–3	6–1	7–0	1–2	2–1	3–0	4–3	2–0	0–0
Istres	0–0	0–1	0–3	0–4	0–0	0–0	2–3	2–0	2–0		2–2	3–0	1–0	2–2	0–2	2–2	2–0	1–0	1–0	4–1
Laval	1–4	1–3	4–5	1–2	3–2	1–1	3–0	1–2	2–1	2–1		1–2	2–1	0–1	0–0	0–0	0–1	1–0	3–0	2–2
Le Havre	2–1	1–2	2–1	1–1	1–0	1–3	3–0	2–1	0–1	2–0	1–2		1–0	2–2	2–1	1–1	1–1	2–1	1–1	3–0
Le Mans	0–2	0–0	3–1	1–1	2–0	3–1	1–2	1–0	0–2	1–2	2–0	0–4		2–1	2–3	0–3	0–3	2–2	1–0	1–0
Lens	1–3	0–0	1–0	0–0	4–3	2–2	1–1	2–0	1–1	1–1	1–0	1–0	2–2		0–4	1–2	1–2	1–0	2–2	0–0
Monaco	2–2	3–0	2–0	0–1	0–0	4–0	1–1	2–2	2–2	3–2	1–1	2–1	2–1	2–1		0–2	1–1	1–1	3–1	4–0
Nantes	1–0	1–1	1–1	2–1	1–1	0–1	2–0	2–1	1–1	1–1	3–1	2–0	2–0	4–0	1–1		1–2	0–0	1–0	3–1
Nîmes	3–0	4–1	4–2	0–2	2–0	3–0	1–1	0–1	2–1	1–0	3–0	0–1	2–1	1–2	0–1	0–0		3–1	2–1	1–1
Niort	0–0	0–0	0–1	1–0	2–2	1–1	4–2	2–1	0–0	0–0	0–0	0–0	2–3	0–0	1–1	0–1	2–0		1–3	3–1
Sedan	2–2	4–2	1–0	2–2	1–1	1–1	0–1	4–1	1–2	0–2	1–3	1–2	2–1	0–1	1–1	0–0	2–3	0–2		1–1
Tours	1–2	0–0	1–0	1–1	3–1	2–1	3–1	2–1	2–0	1–0	1–1	1–2	2–0	0–0	1–2	0–2	1–0	2–2	1–1	

Source: Ligue 2
Legend: Blue = home team win; Yellow = draw; Red = away team win.

== Season statistics ==
=== Top goalscorers ===
Rank	Player	Club	Goals
1	(Mali) Mustapha Yatabaré	Guingamp	23
2	(Serbia) Filip Đorđević	Nantes	20
3	(Senegal) Ibrahima Touré	AS Monaco	18
4	(France) Vincent Gragnic	Nîmes	17
4	(Romania) Claudiu Keșerü	Angers	17
6	(France) Valère Germain	AS Monaco	14
7	(France) Yohann Rivière	Le Havre	13
7	(Mali) Mana Dembélé	Clermont	13
7	(France) Mathieu Duhamel	Caen	13
10	(France) Raphaël Cacérès	Arles-Avignon	12

Source: Official Goalscorers' Standings

=== Assists table ===
Rank	Player	Club	Assists
1	(Morocco) Alharbi El Jadeyaoui	Angers	10
2	(Nigeria) Mouritala Ogunbiyi	Nîmes	8
2	(France) Nicolas Benezet	Nîmes	8
2	(France) Thomas Guerbert	Dijon	8
2	(Martinique) Steeven Langil	Auxerre	8
6	(France) Alexandre Bonnet	Le Havre	7
6	(Kenya) Dennis Oliech	Auxerre	7
6	(France) Valère Germain	AS Monaco	7
6	(Saudi Arabia) Fayçal Fajr	Caen	7
6	(France) Thibault Giresse	Guingamp	7

Source: Official Assists' Table

=== Hat-tricks ===
Player	For	Against	Result	Date
(Senegal) Ibrahima Touré	AS Monaco	Lens	0–4	21 September 2012
(Romania) Claudiu Keșerü^{4}	Angers	Le Mans	4–0	28 September 2012
(Guadeloupe) Claudio Beauvue	Châteauroux	Gazélec Ajaccio	3–1	19 October 2012
(Venezuela) Fernando Aristeguieta	Nantes	Châteauroux	0–4	15 April 2013
(Mali) Mustapha Yatabaré	Guingamp	Lens	7–0	10 May 2013
(France) Raphaël Cacérès	Arles-Avignon	Dijon	2–3	17 May 2013

- ^{4} Player scored 4 goals

=== Scoring ===
- First goal of the season: Steeven Langil for Auxerre against Nîmes (27 July 2012)

== Attendances ==
#	Club	Average	Highest
1	Nantes	18,671	36,967
2	Lens	16,179	26,727
3	Caen	10,129	19,751
4	Guingamp	9,507	18,208
5	Dijon	8,708	12,126
6	Le Havre	8,518	15,552
7	Angers	8,382	16,930
8	Le Mans	7,764	21,373
9	Nîmes	5,641	7,928
10	AJ auxerroise	5,621	9,156
11	Châteauroux	5,528	7,130
12	Sedan	5,311	6,802
13	Monaco	5,295	8,058
14	Chamois niortais	4,943	8,485
15	Stade lavallois	4,736	7,722
16	Tours	4,414	14,046
17	Clermont	4,075	6,815
18	Arles-Avignon	2,354	3,711
19	Istres	2,340	3,628
20	Gazélec	2,148	3,732
