= 2013–14 Ligue 2 =

75th season of the second-tier football league in France

Ligue 2
- Season: 2013–14
- Champions: Metz
- Promoted: Metz; Lens; Caen
- Relegated: CA Bastia; Istres
- Matches: 380
- Goals: 939 (2.47 per match)
- Top goalscorer: Andy Delort and Mathieu Duhamel (24 goals)
- Biggest home win: Troyes 6–1 CA Bastia (4 October 2013)
- Biggest away win: Châteauroux 0–4 Tours (16 August 2013); CA Bastia 1–5 Caen (13 December 2013)
- Highest scoring: Le Havre 6–2 Lens (14 September 2013)
- Longest winning run: 7 matches: Metz
- Longest unbeaten run: 12 matches: Caen
- Longest winless run: 13 matches: CA Bastia
- Highest attendance: 40,740; Lens 0–1 Brest (9 May 2014)
- Lowest attendance: 1,021; CA Bastia 2–2 Le Havre (24 January 2014)
- Average attendance: 7,915

The 2013–14 Ligue 2 was the 75th season of second-tier football in France. The season began on 2 August 2013 and ended on 16 May 2014, with the winter break in effect between 20 December and 10 January.

== Teams ==
=== Stadia and locations ===
Location of teams in 2013–14 Ligue 2

Club	Location	Venue	Capacity	Av. Att.
Angers	Angers	Stade Jean Bouin	17,835	8,358
Arles-Avignon	Avignon	Parc des Sports	17,518	2,012
Auxerre	Auxerre	Stade de l'Abbé-Deschamps	21,379	4,571
CA Bastia	Bastia	Stade Armand Cesari (Note: CA Bastia played their home matches at the Stade Armand Cesari, the home of SC Bastia, since their own stadium, Stade Erbajolo, did not meet the required standards to host Ligue 2 football.)	16,078	1,742
Brest	Brest	Stade Francis-Le Blé	15,583	7,397
Caen	Caen	Stade Michel d'Ornano	21,215	10,794
Châteauroux	Châteauroux	Stade Gaston Petit	17,072	4,859
Clermont	Clermont-Ferrand	Stade Gabriel Montpied	11,980	3,710
Créteil	Créteil	Stade Dominique Duvauchelle	12,150	2,373
Dijon	Dijon	Stade Gaston Gérard	16,098	8,272
Istres	Istres	Stade Parsemain	17,559	2,300
Laval	Laval	Stade Francis Le Basser	18,467	4,867
Le Havre	Le Havre	Stade Océane	25,278	7,249
Lens	Lens	Stade Félix-Bollaert	41,233	31,016
Metz	Metz	Stade Saint-Symphorien	26,661	13,919
Nancy	Tomblaine	Stade Marcel Picot	20,087	14,678
Nîmes	Nîmes	Stade des Costières	18,482	4,961
Niort	Niort	Stade René Gaillard	10,406	4,384
Tours	Tours	Stade de la Vallée du Cher	16,327	5,678
Troyes	Troyes	Stade de l'Aube	20,842	10,029

=== Personnel and kits ===
Note: Flags indicate national team as has been defined under FIFA eligibility rules. Players and managers may hold more than one non-FIFA nationality.

Team	Manager^{1}	Captain^{1}	Kit Manufacturer^{1}	Main Sponsor^{1}
Angers	(France) Stéphane Moulin	(France) Grégory Malicki	Kappa	Scania
Arles-Avignon	(France) Noël Tosi	(France) Ludovic Butelle	Legea	Groupe Nicollin
Auxerre	(France) Jean-Luc Vannuchi	(Mali) Adama Coulibaly	Airness	Maisons Pierre
Brest	(France) Alex Dupont	(Morocco) Ahmed Kantari	Nike	Quéguiner
CA Bastia	(France) Stéphane Rossi	(France) Rémy Arnoux	Erreà	Corsicatour
Caen	(France) Patrice Garande	(France) Jérémy Sorbon	Nike	GDE Recyclage
Châteauroux	(France) Jean-Louis Garcia	(Senegal) Massamba Sambou	Nike	Le Seyec
Clermont	(France) Régis Brouard	(France) Jean-François Rivière	Patrick Sport	Crédit Mutuel
Créteil	(France) Jean-Luc Vasseur	(France) Sebastien Gondouin	Nike	SFB Béton
Dijon	(France) Olivier Dall'Oglio	(France) Cédric Varrault	Kappa	Doras
Istres	(France) Frédéric Arpinon	(Algeria) Nassim Akrour	Duarig	Kertel
Laval	(France) Denis Zanko	(France) Fabrice Levrat	Duarig	Lactel
Le Havre	(France) Erick Mombaerts	(France) Yohann Rivière	Nike	System U
Lens	(France) Antoine Kombouaré	(France) Yohan Demont	adidas	Invicta
Metz	(France) Albert Cartier	(France) Gregory Proment	Nike	Moselle
Nancy	(Uruguay) Pablo Correa	(Brazil) André Luiz	Nike	Odalys Vacances
Nîmes	(France) René Marsiglia	(France) Benoît Poulain	Erreà	Mac Dan
Niort	(France) Pascal Gastien	(Senegal) Mouhamadou Diaw	Puma	Restaurant Le Billon (home), Cheminées Poujoulat (away)
Tours	(France) Olivier Pantaloni	(France) Julien Cardy	Duarig	Invicta
Troyes	(France) Jean-Marc Furlan	(Central African Republic) Eloge Enza Yamissi	Duarig	Afflelou

^{1}Subject to change during the season.

=== Managerial changes ===
Team	Outgoing head coach	Manner of departure	Date of vacancy	Position in table	Incoming head coach	Date of appointment	Position in table
Brest	(France) Corentin Martins	End of tenure as caretaker	31 May 2013	Off-season	(France) Alex Dupont	31 May 2013	Off-season
Tours	(France) Bernard Blaquart	Resigned	23 June 2013	Off-season	(France) Olivier Pantaloni	25 June 2013	Off-season
Lens	(France) Éric Sikora	Sacked	25 June 2013	Off-season	(France) Antoine Kombouaré	25 June 2013	Off-season
Nancy	(France) Patrick Gabriel	Sacked	12 October 2013	15th	(Uruguay) Pablo Correa	12 October 2013	15th
Châteauroux	(France) Didier Tholot	Sacked	28 October 2013	17th	(France) Jean-Louis Garcia	28 October 2013	17th
Nîmes	(France) Victor Zvunka	Sacked	19 December 2013	19th	(France) René Marsiglia	26 December 2013	19th
Laval	(France) Philippe Hinschberger	Sacked	24 February 2014	19th	(France) Denis Zanko	24 February 2014	19th
Auxerre	(France) Bernard Casoni	Sacked	17 March 2014	15th	(France) Jean-Luc Vannuchi	17 March 2014	15th
Istres	(France) José Pasqualetti	Sacked	24 March 2014	17th	(France) Frédéric Arpinon	24 March 2014	17th

== League table ==
Pos	Team	Pld	W	D	L	GF	GA	GD	Pts	Promotion or Relegation
1	Metz (C, P)	38	22	10	6	55	28	+27	76	Promotion to Ligue 1
2	Lens (P)	38	17	14	7	58	40	+18	65	Promoted officially but with some conditions.
3	Caen (P)	38	18	10	10	65	44	+21	64	Promotion to Ligue 1
4	Nancy	38	16	13	9	47	37	+10	61	
5	Niort	38	15	13	10	51	47	+4	58	
6	Dijon	38	14	15	9	53	42	+11	57	
7	Brest	38	15	11	12	38	32	+6	56	
8	Tours	38	15	10	13	63	56	+7	55	
9	Angers	38	14	13	11	46	45	+1	55	
10	Troyes	38	15	7	16	56	44	+12	52	
11	Créteil	38	12	14	12	57	58	−1	50	
12	Le Havre	38	11	15	12	43	43	0	48	
13	Arles-Avignon	38	10	16	12	36	38	−2	46	
14	Clermont	38	10	15	13	31	38	−7	45	
15	Nîmes	38	10	14	14	49	54	−5	44	
16	Auxerre	38	10	13	15	35	45	−10	43	
17	Laval	38	10	12	16	44	52	−8	42	
18	Châteauroux	38	10	10	18	43	59	−16	40	Spared due to the DNCG’s rulings.
19	Istres (R)	38	9	9	20	48	74	−26	36	Relegated, but later readmitted and later relegated.
20	CA Bastia (R)	38	4	12	22	21	63	−42	24	Relegation to Championnat National

Source: Ligue 2
Rules for classification: 1) points; 2) goal difference; 3) number of goals scored.
(C) Champions; (P) Promoted; (R) Relegated

== Results ==
Home \ Away	ANG	ACAA	AUX	CAB	BRS	CAE	CHA	CLR	CRE	DIJ	IST	LVL	LHA	RCL	MET	NAL	NMS	NRT	TOU	TRO
Angers		1–0	2–0	1–0	2–1	1–2	1–0	0–2	2–2	0–0	1–0	1–1	1–0	1–2	2–2	1–1	2–3	2–0	1–1	1–1
Arles-Avignon	3–0		0–2	0–0	1–0	3–2	1–1	1–0	2–1	0–0	2–2	1–1	2–0	1–1	1–0	1–2	1–1	0–0	1–0	3–0
Auxerre	1–2	1–1		1–0	0–0	3–2	2–0	0–2	1–1	2–2	1–0	2–0	2–1	1–2	0–3	0–0	1–1	2–0	4–0	0–0
CA Bastia	1–1	2–2	0–0		0–1	1–5	1–4	1–1	3–1	0–0	2–2	1–1	0–0	0–2	0–2	1–2	0–0	0–3	1–2	1–0
Brest	1–0	2–0	1–0	2–0		0–1	3–0	2–0	1–2	0–0	3–1	2–1	1–1	0–1	0–3	0–0	1–1	0–1	2–0	1–1
Caen	1–1	1–0	1–0	6–1	0–0		1–1	2–1	3–0	3–1	4–0	2–1	1–0	1–0	0–2	1–2	1–1	3–1	1–3	1–1
Châteauroux	0–1	2–0	2–0	2–0	3–3	0–2		3–0	0–2	3–1	2–0	1–1	2–2	1–1	0–1	0–3	2–0	3–0	0–4	2–1
Clermont	1–1	1–1	1–1	2–0	1–0	2–2	1–1		0–0	0–1	2–0	2–1	0–1	0–0	0–0	1–0	1–0	0–1	2–1	0–3
Créteil	0–0	1–1	0–2	3–0	0–0	1–2	3–2	2–0		1–3	2–2	4–0	2–0	2–3	3–2	1–1	1–1	1–1	2–1	0–3
Dijon	1–3	1–1	1–0	3–0	3–0	2–2	2–1	1–0	2–2		4–1	1–0	1–2	1–1	2–2	1–0	5–1	2–2	2–0	2–1
Istres	2–4	1–0	1–1	1–1	3–1	2–3	0–0	1–1	3–2	2–4		3–0	0–1	1–6	1–2	0–0	4–2	2–1	1–0	0–2
Laval	4–1	1–1	3–0	2–0	2–1	1–2	2–2	0–0	5–1	0–0	3–4		2–2	0–2	0–0	1–0	1–3	2–4	1–0	2–1
Le Havre	1–2	2–1	2–0	1–0	0–1	1–1	0–0	0–1	3–1	0–0	1–0	1–1		6–2	1–1	1–1	0–1	1–2	2–2	2–1
Lens	0–0	3–0	4–1	1–0	0–1	2–1	2–0	1–1	1–1	2–2	1–2	0–0	1–1		3–2	1–1	1–0	2–0	2–2	1–0
Metz	1–0	1–0	3–0	1–0	2–1	2–1	1–0	1–0	1–1	2–0	2–1	1–0	3–0	0–1		3–0	2–2	1–1	1–1	1–0
Nancy	3–1	0–0	0–0	0–1	0–1	1–1	2–0	3–2	2–2	2–1	3–1	2–1	3–2	1–0	0–1		1–0	1–1	2–3	2–1
Nîmes	0–2	1–2	2–2	0–1	1–1	2–1	3–1	1–1	2–3	1–1	1–0	2–1	0–0	3–3	0–0	0–1		4–1	3–0	3–2
Niort	2–1	1–0	1–0	1–1	1–2	0–0	4–0	0–0	2–1	2–0	3–1	0–1	1–1	2–2	2–0	2–2	2–1		3–2	1–1
Tours	2–0	2–2	2–2	1–0	1–1	2–1	5–2	3–0	1–2	1–0	2–2	2–0	2–2	3–1	4–2	1–3	3–1	1–1		1–2
Troyes	3–3	1–0	2–0	6–1	0–2	2–1	3–0	2–2	0–3	2–0	4–1	0–1	0–1	1–0	0–1	2–0	2–1	4–1	1–2	

Source: Ligue 2
Legend: Blue = home team win; Yellow = draw; Red = away team win.

== Statistics ==
=== Top goalscorers ===
Rank	Player	Club	Goals
1	(Algeria) Andy Delort	Tours	24
1	(France) Mathieu Duhamel	Caen	24
3	(Senegal) Diafra Sakho	Metz	20
4	(Cameroon) Christian Bekamenga	Laval	18
4	(Argentina) Emiliano Sala	Niort	18
6	(France) Ghislain Gimbert	Troyes	14
6	(France) Yeni Ngbakoto	Metz	14
8	(Haiti) Jeff Louis	Nancy	12
8	(France) Yoann Touzghar	Lens	12

Source: Official Goalscorers' Standings

== Attendances ==
#	Club	Average	Highest
1	Lens	31,016	40,740
2	Nancy	14,678	19,028
3	Metz	13,916	23,506
4	Caen	10,794	20,027
5	ESTAC	10,029	17,565
6	Dijon	8,272	10,869
7	Angers	8,265	12,487
8	Stade brestois	7,609	9,648
9	Havre AC	7,519	14,325
10	Tours	6,181	13,035
11	Nîmes	5,733	11,711
12	La Berrichonne	5,659	13,548
13	AJ auxerroise	5,639	12,088
14	Stade lavallois	5,550	12,840
15	Chamois niortais	5,075	7,058
16	Clermont	3,828	6,825
17	Créteil	2,603	5,457
18	Istres	2,329	3,513
19	Arles	2,177	3,226
20	CA Bastia	1,407	2,163
