= 2011–12 Ligue 2 =

73rd season of the second-tier football league in France

Ligue 2
- Season: 2011–12
- Champions: Bastia
- Promoted: Bastia; Reims; Troyes
- Relegated: Metz; Amiens; Boulogne
- Matches: 380
- Goals: 872 (2.29 per match)
- Top goalscorer: Cédric Fauré (15 goals)
- Biggest home win: Nantes 5–0 Amiens (27 April 2012)
- Biggest away win: Arles-Avignon 1–5 Istres (20 December 2011)
- Highest scoring: Metz 2–5 Guingamp (4 May 2012)
- Longest winning run: 4 games Reims (30 July – 19 August); Bastia (16 December – 18 January)
- Longest unbeaten run: 7 games Clermont (30 September – 2 December)
- Longest winless run: 10 games AS Monaco (23 September – 20 December)
- Longest losing run: 4 games Arles-Avignon (21 October – 25 November); Amiens (16 December – 18 January)
- Highest attendance: 30,961 – Lens 2–0 Châteauroux (20 December 2011)
- Lowest attendance: 1,777 – Istres 3–1 Châteauroux (20 September 2011)
- Average attendance: 7,999

The 2011–12 Ligue 2 season was the 73rd since its establishment. The previous season's champions was Evian. The league schedule was announced on 31 March 2011 and the fixtures were determined on 10 June. The season began on 29 July and ended on 18 May 2012. The winter break was in effect from 21 December to 14 January.

Bastia clinched the second division title on 1 May 2012 with three matches to spare after defeating Metz 3–0 at the Stade Armand Cesari. The title is the club's second overall in the division having won the league previously in the 1967–68 season. Bastia will be making its return to the first division after a seven-year absence and will be entering Ligue 1 on a run of two consecutive promotions. The club had earned promotion to Ligue 2 after winning the 2010–11 edition of the Championnat National.

Reims and Troyes became the second and third club, respectively, to earn promotion to Ligue 1 alongside the champions Bastia. Both clubs achieved promotion with one game to spare following league victories on 11 May 2012, which positioned each club in second and third place permanently. Reims, which is a six-time Ligue 1 champion, will be returning to the first division after over 33 years playing in the lower divisions. During those 33 years, the club underwent liquidation and had all aspects of the club (its records, trophies, etc.) auctioned off. Troyes will be returning to Ligue 1 after a four-year stint in Ligue 2.

== Teams ==
Location of teams in 2011–12 Ligue 2

There were three promoted teams from the Championnat National, the third division of French football, replacing the three teams that were relegated from Ligue 2 following the 2010–11 season. A total of 20 teams competed in the league with three clubs suffering relegation to the Championnat National. All clubs that secured Ligue 2 status for the season were subject to approval by the DNCG before becoming eligible to participate.

Arles-Avignon was the first club to suffer relegation from the first division to Ligue 2. The club's impending drop occurred on 17 April 2011 following the team's 2–0 defeat to AS Monaco. The negative result made it mathematically impossible for Arles to seize the 17th position in the table, which would have allowed the club to remain in Ligue 1. Arles-Avignon made its return to Ligue 2 after only a year's spell in the top division of French football. On 15 May, Lens were relegated from the first division to Ligue 2 after its 1–1 draw with Monaco. Lens returned to Ligue 2 for the first time since the 2008–09 season when the club finished as champions of the league. On the final day of the Ligue 1 season, Monaco suffered relegation to the second division after losing 2–0 to Lyon. The club's appearance in Ligue 2 was its first since 1976.

Bastia became the first team to achieve promotion to Ligue 2 from the Championnat National after drawing 1–1 with Fréjus Saint-Raphaël on 22 April. Coupled with fourth-place Strasbourg's draw with Luzenac on the same day, the results made it mathematically impossible for the Alsatians to catch Bastia in the standings. Amiens achieved promotion from National to Ligue 2 on 13 May following its 2–1 home win against Guingamp. Amiens made its return to the second division after spending two seasons in the Championnat National. Guingamp became the final club to earn promotion to National after its 2–0 away win over Rouen. Similar to Bastia, Guingamp made its return to Ligue 2 after only one season in the third division.

Teams relegated to Ligue 2

- AS Monaco
- Lens
- Arles-Avignon

Teams promoted to Ligue 2

- Bastia
- Amiens
- Guingamp

=== DNCG rulings ===
On 1 July 2011, following a preliminary review of each club's administrative and financial accounts in Ligue 2, the DNCG ruled that Tours would be relegated to the Championnat National. Tours president, Frédéric Sebag, confirmed the demotion was as a result of the club's failure to "balance its books". Sebag also confirmed that the club would be appealing the ruling. On 13 July, Tours successfully appealed to the DNCG and was subsequently reinstated into Ligue 2.

=== Stadia and locations ===
Club	Location	Venue	Capacity	Average attendance
Amiens	Amiens	Stade de la Licorne	12,097	9,411
Angers	Angers	Stade Jean Bouin	17,100	5,345
Arles-Avignon	Avignon	Parc des Sports	17,518	2,678
Bastia	Bastia	Stade Armand Cesari	10,460	10,406
Boulogne	Boulogne-sur-Mer	Stade de la Libération	15,004	8,168
Châteauroux	Châteauroux	Stade Gaston Petit	17,173	5,300
Clermont	Clermont-Ferrand	Stade Gabriel Montpied	10,363	4,726
Guingamp	Guingamp	Stade du Roudourou	18,126	7,311
Istres	Istres	Stade Parsemain	17,468	2,106
Laval	Laval	Stade Francis Le Basser	18,739	5,748
Le Havre	Le Havre	Stade Jules Deschaseaux	16,454	6,987
Le Mans	Le Mans	MMArena	25,000	6,973
Lens	Lens	Stade Félix-Bollaert	41,233	22,519
Metz	Metz	Stade Municipal Saint-Symphorien	26,700	9,158
AS Monaco	Fontvieille	Stade Louis II	18,500	4,936
Nantes	Nantes	Stade de la Beaujoire	38,285	12,506
Reims	Reims	Stade Auguste-Delaune II	22,000	11,084
Sedan	Sedan	Stade Louis Dugauguez	23,189	8,183
Tours	Tours	Stade de la Vallée du Cher	13,500	5,478
Troyes	Troyes	Stade de l'Aube	21,877	7,613

=== Personnel and kits ===
Note: Flags indicate national team as has been defined under FIFA eligibility rules. Players and managers may hold more than one non-FIFA nationality.

Team	Manager^{1}	Captain^{1}	Kit Manufacturer^{1}	Main Sponsor^{1}
Amiens	(France) Ludovic Batelli	(France) Thomas Mienniel	Kappa	Intersport|
Angers	(France) Stéphane Moulin	(France) Grégory Malicki	Umbro	Next Generation
Arles-Avignon	(France) Thierry Laurey	(France) Fabien Laurenti	Uhlsport	Groupe Nicollin
Bastia	(France) Frédéric Hantz	(France) Yannick Cahuzac	Kappa	Oscaro
Boulogne	(France) Michel Estevan	(Mali) Bakary Soumare	Uhlsport	Boostyle
Châteauroux	(France) Didier Tholot	(France) Romain Reynaud	Nike	Le Seyec
Clermont	(Armenia) Michel Der Zakarian	(France) Damien Perrinelle	Kappa	Clermont-Ferrand
Guingamp	(France) Jocelyn Gourvennec	(France) Lionel Mathis	adidas	Groupe Stalaven
Istres	(France) José Pasqualetti	(France) Amor Kehiha	Duarig	Kertel
Laval	(France) Philippe Hinschberger	(France) Fabrice Levrat	Duarig	Lactel
Le Havre	(France) Cédric Daury	(France) Julien François	Airness	System U
Le Mans	(France) Denis Zanko	(France) Frédéric Thomas	Macron	LOUÉ
Lens	(France) Jean-Louis Garcia	(France) Yohan Demont	adidas	Invicta
Metz	(France) Dominique Bijotat	(France) Ludovic Guerriero	Nike	Moselle
AS Monaco	(Italy) Marco Simone	(France) Ludovic Giuly	Macron	Fedcom
Nantes	(France) Landry Chauvin	(Brazil) Matheus Vivian	Erreà	offset 5
Reims	(France) Hubert Fournier	(France) Mickaël Tacalfred	Kappa	Sanei
Sedan	(France) Laurent Guyot	(France) Jérôme Lemoigne	Nike	Invicta
Tours	(Germany) Peter Zeidler	(France) Julien Cardy	Duarig	Invicta
Troyes	(France) Jean-Marc Furlan	(Central African Republic) Eloge Enza Yamissi	Duarig	Urbanéo

^{1}Subject to change during the season.

=== Managerial changes ===
Team	Outgoing head coach	Manner of departure	Date of vacancy	Position in table	Incoming head coach	Date of appointment	Position in table
Sedan	(France) Landry Chauvin	End of contract	26 May 2011	Off-season	(France) Laurent Guyot	26 May 2011	Off-season
Lens	(Romania) László Bölöni	Mutual consent	1 June 2011	Off-season	(France) Jean-Louis Garcia	1 June 2011	Off-season
Nantes	(France) Philippe Anziani	Mutual consent	26 May 2011	Off-season	(France) Landry Chauvin	1 June 2011	Off-season
Angers	(France) Jean-Louis Garcia	Joined Lens	1 June 2011	Off-season	(France) Stéphane Moulin	2 June 2011	Off-season
Tours	(France) Daniel Sanchez	Joined Valenciennes	8 June 2011	Off-season	(Germany) Peter Zeidler	14 June 2011	Off-season
AS Monaco	(France) Laurent Banide	Fired	12 September 2011	17th	(Italy) Marco Simone	12 September 2011	17th
Arles-Avignon	(Bosnia and Herzegovina) Faruk Hadžibegić	Fired	23 November 2011	19th	(France) Thierry Laurey	28 November 2011	19th
Le Mans	(France) Arnaud Cormier	Fired	22 December 2011	17th	(France) Denis Zanko	28 December 2011	17th

=== Ownership changes ===
Club	New owner	Previous owner	Date
AS Monaco	(Russia) Monaco Sports Invest	(France) AS Monaco	23 December 2011

== League table ==
Pos	Team	Pld	W	D	L	GF	GA	GD	Pts	Promotion or Relegation
1	Bastia (C, P)	38	21	8	9	61	36	+25	71	Promotion to Ligue 1
2	Reims (P)	38	18	11	9	54	37	+17	65	Promotion to Ligue 1
3	Troyes (P)	38	17	13	8	45	35	+10	64	Promotion to Ligue 1
4	Sedan	38	15	14	9	56	45	+11	59	
5	Clermont	38	15	13	10	48	39	+9	58	
6	Tours	38	15	11	12	44	43	+1	56	
7	Guingamp	38	15	10	13	46	43	+3	55	
8	Monaco	38	13	13	12	41	48	−7	52	
9	Nantes	38	14	9	15	51	42	+9	51	
10	Istres	38	13	12	13	46	44	+2	51	
11	Angers	38	13	12	13	44	45	−1	51	
12	Lens	38	12	12	14	42	48	−6	48	
13	Arles-Avignon	38	10	18	10	34	41	−7	48	
14	Châteauroux	38	14	6	18	38	54	−16	48	
15	Le Havre	38	11	14	13	38	34	+4	47	
16	Laval	38	12	11	15	46	50	−4	47	
17	Le Mans	38	11	12	15	39	40	−1	45	
18	Metz (R)	38	10	12	16	30	44	−14	42	Relegation to Championnat National
19	Boulogne (R)	38	7	15	16	40	47	−7	36	Relegation to Championnat National
20	Amiens (R)	38	4	14	20	29	57	−28	26	Relegation to Championnat National

Source: Ligue 2
Rules for classification: 1) points; 2) goal difference; 3) number of goals scored.
(C) Champions; (P) Promoted; (R) Relegated

== Results ==
Home \ Away	AMI	ANG	ACAA	BAS	BOU	CHA	CLR	GUI	IST	LVL	LHA	MFC	RCL	MET	ASM	NAN	REI	SED	TOU	TRO
Amiens		2–0	0–3	1–1	0–0	4–0	1–1	0–0	1–2	1–0	0–1	0–0	1–2	1–1	1–2	0–2	0–2	0–3	1–1	1–1
Angers	0–0		2–0	1–1	2–1	2–0	0–1	1–0	3–1	0–0	1–2	1–1	1–1	2–0	1–2	2–0	0–0	1–3	1–0	2–3
Arles-Avignon	1–1	2–2		0–0	2–1	0–0	0–2	1–2	1–5	1–0	1–0	1–0	3–0	1–0	2–1	0–0	2–2	0–0	2–2	0–0
Bastia	2–1	3–1	3–0		2–0	2–1	1–1	3–1	3–1	3–2	1–0	1–0	2–2	3–0	1–1	2–1	1–0	2–2	4–1	5–1
Boulogne	0–1	3–3	1–1	1–3		0–1	1–1	2–0	1–1	3–0	1–1	2–0	0–2	0–1	1–2	2–1	0–0	1–1	0–0	2–0
Châteauroux	4–1	0–1	1–2	0–2	2–1		2–1	0–2	0–2	3–1	1–0	1–0	1–0	1–1	2–1	2–2	1–1	0–1	1–3	1–0
Clermont	2–1	1–2	0–0	2–1	1–2	2–1		0–1	2–2	2–0	2–1	1–1	2–0	1–0	1–0	0–0	1–0	1–1	0–1	1–1
Guingamp	1–1	1–0	1–1	1–1	1–1	1–1	3–1		1–0	1–0	1–0	1–1	3–0	0–1	4–0	2–0	2–3	1–3	0–0	0–0
Istres	2–1	0–1	0–0	1–0	0–0	3–1	2–2	2–1		1–2	1–1	1–2	2–1	1–0	0–1	2–1	1–1	1–1	1–0	0–0
Laval	3–1	0–1	2–1	1–0	2–2	1–1	1–2	1–2	2–1		0–2	2–1	2–2	0–0	1–0	2–0	3–2	5–1	1–2	0–0
Le Havre	2–0	3–0	1–1	2–0	0–0	3–0	0–2	3–1	0–0	1–1		1–1	0–0	1–1	2–2	1–1	1–1	0–0	2–1	3–0
Le Mans	3–2	2–2	1–1	3–0	1–0	0–1	0–2	1–0	1–0	1–3	3–1		0–1	0–1	0–1	0–0	0–1	3–1	0–1	1–1
Lens	1–1	0–0	0–0	1–3	2–0	2–3	2–1	0–2	1–0	0–0	2–0	1–3		0–2	2–2	1–0	0–2	4–2	3–0	2–1
Metz	1–0	1–1	0–0	0–1	1–0	2–1	2–2	2–5	1–2	2–2	0–2	0–1	2–0		0–2	1–3	1–0	0–2	1–1	2–2
Monaco	1–1	1–3	1–0	0–1	0–0	2–1	0–0	1–0	3–2	2–1	1–0	2–2	2–2	0–2		2–1	1–2	2–2	0–0	0–2
Nantes	5–0	2–1	3–0	0–2	3–3	3–0	1–0	4–0	3–1	2–3	1–0	1–1	1–0	0–0	3–0		2–0	1–2	1–0	1–1
Reims	1–0	3–0	3–2	1–0	3–2	2–0	2–2	2–1	2–1	1–1	2–1	1–1	1–1	3–0	2–0	3–1		1–2	2–3	1–0
Sedan	3–1	2–2	0–0	2–0	1–4	2–0	1–2	0–1	1–1	2–1	3–0	0–2	1–1	1–1	2–2	2–0	1–0		3–0	1–2
Tours	1–1	1–0	4–1	2–1	3–1	1–2	2–1	5–1	1–2	0–0	0–0	2–1	0–3	1–0	0–0	2–1	1–1	1–0		0–2
Troyes	2–0	2–1	0–1	1–0	2–1	0–1	3–2	1–1	1–1	3–0	1–0	2–1	2–0	1–0	1–1	2–0	1–0	1–1	2–1	

Source: Ligue 2
Legend: Blue = home team win; Yellow = draw; Red = away team win.

== Statistics ==
=== Top goalscorers ===
Rank	Player	Club	Goals
1	(France) Cédric Fauré	Reims	15
2	(Algeria) Kamel Ghilas	Reims	14
3	(France) Toifilou Maoulida	Bastia	13
3	(Cape Verde) Ryan Mendes	Le Havre	13
4	(France) Nicolas Fauvergue	Sedan	12
4	(France) Alexis Allart	Boulogne	12
4	(France) Gaëtan Charbonnier	Angers	12
4	(Brazil) Marcos	Troyes	12
9	(France) Anthony Knockaert	Guingamp	11
9	(France) Jean-François Rivière	Clermont	11

Last updated: 18 May 2012
Source: Official Goalscorers' Standings

=== Assists table ===
Rank	Player	Club	Assists
1	(France) Akim Orinel	Châteauroux	11
1	(Argentina) Diego Gómez	Angers	11
3	(France) Julien Faussurier	Troyes	8
4	(Cape Verde) Odaïr Fortes	Reims	7
4	(Tunisia) Wahbi Khazri	Bastia	7
4	(France) Thibault Giresse	Guingamp	7
4	(Tunisia) Chaouki Ben Saada	Lens	7
4	(Morocco) Mounir Obbadi	Troyes	7
4	(Brazil) Diego Rigonato	Tours	7
4	(France) Jérôme Rothen	Bastia	7

Last updated: 18 May 2012
Source: Official Assists' Table

=== Scoring ===
- First goal of the season: Yoann Tougzhar for Amiens against Troyes (29 July 2011)
- First own goal of the season: Nicolas Pallois for Clermont against Laval (29 July 2011)
- Highest scoring game: 7 goals
  - Metz 2–5 Guingamp (4 May 2012)
- Widest winning margin: 5 goals
  - Nantes 5–0 Amiens (27 April 2012)
- Most goals scored in a match by a single team: 5 goals
  - Tours 5–1 Guingamp (16 December 2011)
  - Arles-Avignon 1–5 Istres (20 December 2011)
  - Bastia 5–1 Troyes (4 February 2012)
  - Laval 5–1 Sedan (6 April 2012)
  - Nantes 5–0 Amiens (27 April 2012)
  - Metz 2–5 Guingamp (4 May 2012)

=== Discipline ===
- Worst overall disciplinary record (1 pt per yellow card, 3 pts per red card):
  - Arles-Avignon – 59 points (44 yellow & 5 red cards)
- Best overall disciplinary record: 33 points
  - Boulogne (30 yellow & 1 red cards)
- Most yellow cards (club): 46
  - Amiens
- Most red cards (club): 7
  - Istres

== Awards ==
=== Annual awards ===
==== UNFP Player of the Year ====
The nominees for the UNFP Ligue 2 Player of the Year award was awarded to Bastia midfielder Jérôme Rothen.

==== UNFP Goalkeeper of the Year ====
The UNFP Goalkeeper of the Year award was awarded to Macedo Novaes of Bastia.

==== UNFP Manager of the Year ====
The UNFP Manager of the Year award went to Frédéric Hantz of Bastia.

==== UNFP Team of the Year ====
The UNFP selected the following 11 players for the Ligue 2 Team of the Year:

Goalkeeper

- (Brazil) Macedo Novaes (Bastia)

Defenders

- (Comoros) Kassim Abdallah (Sedan)
- (France) Anthony Weber (Reims)
- (France) Mickaël Tacalfred (Reims)
- (Algeria) Féthi Harek (Bastia)

Midfielders

- (Guinea) Sadio Diallo (Bastia)
- (Tunisia) Wahbi Khazri (Bastia)
- (France) Romain Alessandrini (Clermont)
- (France) Jérôme Rothen (Bastia)

Forwards

- (Cape Verde) Ryan Mendes (Le Havre)
- (Algeria) Kamel Ghilas (Reims)

== Attendances ==
#	Club	Average	Highest
1	Lens	21,774	30,961
2	Nantes	13,419	28,746
3	Reims	12,851	20,621
4	Troyes	10,785	20,346
5	Bastia	9,906	13,916
6	Amiens	9,573	11,805
7	Guingamp	9,536	15,664
8	Metz	9,425	13,733
9	Boulogne	8,222	10,478
10	Le Mans	8,190	16,083
11	Le Havre	8,042	16,026
12	Sedan	7,816	11,778
13	Angers	6,951	10,443
14	Châteauroux	6,052	7,761
15	Stade lavallois	5,815	8,663
16	Clermont	5,505	9,814
17	Tours	5,370	7,734
18	Monaco	4,602	6,596
19	Arles-Avignon	2,799	4,914
20	Istres	2,458	5,280
