= 2010–11 Ligue 2 =

72nd season of the second-tier football league in France

Ligue 2
- Season: 2010–11
- Champions: Évian
- Promoted: Évian; Ajaccio; Dijon
- Relegated: Vannes; Nîmes; Grenoble
- Matches: 380
- Goals: 861 (2.27 per match)
- Top goalscorer: Sebastián Ribas (23 goals)
- Biggest home win: Le Havre 5–0 Grenoble (27 May 2011)
- Biggest away win: Angers 0–3 Sedan (27 August 2010); Sedan 1–4 Évian (8 April 2011); Vannes 0–3 Sedan (15 April 2011)
- Highest scoring: Istres 5–3 Sedan (11 March 2011); Istres 5–3 Châteauroux (27 May 2011)
- Longest winning run: 4 games Tours (17 August – 10 September); Boulogne (29 January – 24 February)
- Longest unbeaten run: 13 games Boulogne (6 August – 29 October)
- Longest losing run: 4 games Grenoble (13 – 30 August)
- Highest attendance: 24,442 – Metz 3–0 Nîmes (20 May 2011)
- Lowest attendance: 1,709 – Istres 1–0 Tours (13 August 2010)
- Average attendance: 6,252

The 2010–11 Ligue 2 season was the 72nd since its establishment. Caen were the defending champions. The fixtures were announced on 22 May 2010 and the season began on 6 August and ended on 27 May 2011. The winter break would be in effect between 22 December and 14 January 2011. There were three promoted teams from the Championnat National, replacing the three teams that were relegated from Ligue 2 following the 2009–10 season. A total of 20 teams currently competes in the league with three clubs suffering relegation to the third division, the Championnat National. All clubs that secured Ligue 2 status for the season were subject to approval by the DNCG before becoming eligible to participate. In addition, German sportswear company Puma, whom the Ligue de Football Professionnel share a partnership with, provided a brand new match ball for the new season.

== Teams ==
Location of teams in 2010–11 Ligue 2

Grenoble was the first club to suffer relegation to Ligue 2. The club's impending drop occurred on 10 April 2010 following the team's 4–0 defeat to Toulouse. On 3 May 2010, both US Boulogne and Le Mans were relegated to Ligue 2 following defeats. Le Mans relegation was confirmed following their 3–2 loss away to Nancy, while Boulogne suffered relegation after losing 1–0 to Saint-Étienne, who both Boulogne and Le Mans were trailing. Having earned promotion to Ligue 1 the previous season, Boulogne's return to Ligue 2 meant a short-lived stay in the highest division. Due to suffering relegation to Ligue 2, Le Mans will unveil their new logo and new name, Le Mans Football Club, as well as their new stadium, MMArena, while playing in the second division.

In the Championnat National, Évian was the first club to achieve promotion to Ligue 2 after defeating Amiens 1–0 on 16 April. On 7 May, Stade Reims made their return to Ligue 2 after one season in the Championnat National following a convincing 4–2 win over Luzenac. With Troyes drawing with Cannes the same day, Reims' second-place position and promotion was secured. The following week, the final club in National achieved promotion to Ligue 2 with Troyes' 2–0 win over Cassis Carnoux.

Teams relegated to Ligue 2

- Le Mans
- Boulogne
- Grenoble

Teams promoted to Ligue 2

- Évian
- Reims
- Troyes

=== Stadia and locations ===
After earning promotion to Ligue 2 for the 2010–11 season, Évian were rumored to be pursuing a move to play their home matches at the Stade de la Praille in Geneva, Switzerland after it was determined that their current facility, the Stade Joseph-Moynat, did not meet the Ligue de Football Professionnel's standards. Thonon-les-Bains, the commune where the club situates itself, is a few kilometers from the Swiss border and is only 34.6 kilometres (21.5 mi), a 45-minute car drive, from the city of Geneva. It was reported that the club's president, Patrick Trotignon, had been in the process of advocating for the move since the beginning of the 2009–10 Championnat National season just in case the club had achieved promotion to the second division. The vice-president of Swiss club Servette FC, who occupy the stadium, questioned the move citing possible schedule conflicts, as well as the health of the pitch if both clubs were to use the stadium on a weekly basis. However, his claims were refuted by Benoît Genecand, who serves as president of Fondation du Stade de Genève (FSG), which owns and operates the facility. The club responded immediately to Genecand's comments via a press release posted on the club's official website.

Évian petitioned to the State Council of Geneva and obtained approval from the LFP for the move in early May. On 20 May 2010, Évian received a favorable ruling from the French Football Federation with the Federal Council voting in favor of the move. According to the federation, the move now had to be agreed upon by a UEFA executive committee, which is composed of seventeen officials. On 8 June, UEFA officially denied Évian's request to play at the Stade de la Praille meaning the club will likely play its home matches at the Parc des Sports in nearby Annecy.

| Club | Location | Venue | Capacity | Average attendance^{1} |
|---|---|---|---|---|
| Ajaccio | Ajaccio | Stade François Coty | 10,660 | 3,280 |
| Angers | Angers | Stade Jean Bouin | 17,100 | 6,292 |
| Boulogne | Boulogne-sur-Mer | Stade de la Libération | 15,004 | 8,581 |
| Châteauroux | Châteauroux | Stade Gaston Petit | 17,173 | 6,082 |
| Clermont | Clermont-Ferrand | Stade Gabriel Montpied | 10,363 | 3,993 |
| Dijon | Dijon | Stade Gaston Gérard | 9,111 | 5,751 |
| Évian | Annecy | Parc des Sports^{2} | 12,500 | 4,674 |
| Grenoble | Grenoble | Stade des Alpes | 20,068 | 5,235 |
| Istres | Istres | Stade Parsemain | 17,468 | 1,824 |
| Laval | Laval | Stade Francis Le Basser | 18,739 | 5,557 |
| Le Havre | Le Havre | Stade Jules Deschaseaux | 16,454 | 7,380 |
| Le Mans | Le Mans | MMArena^{3} | 25,000 | 8,826 |
| Nantes | Nantes | Stade de la Beaujoire | 38,285 | 11,270 |
| Nîmes | Nîmes | Stade des Costières | 18,482 | 6,392 |
| Metz | Metz | Stade Municipal Saint-Symphorien | 26,700 | 7,389 |
| Reims | Reims | Stade Auguste-Delaune II | 22,000 | 8,184 |
| Sedan | Sedan | Stade Louis Dugauguez | 23,189 | 8,952 |
| Tours | Tours | Stade de la Vallée du Cher | 13,500 | 6,287 |
| Troyes | Troyes | Stade de l'Aube | 21,877 | 8,877 |
| Vannes | Vannes | Stade de la Rabine | 8,000 | 3,687 |

^{1}Source
^{2}Temporary facility as current home stadia, the Stade Joseph-Moynat, doesn't meet the LFP's stadium criteria.
^{3}Replaced the Stade Léon-Bollée in January 2011.

=== Personnel and kits ===
| Team | Manager^{1} | Captain^{1} | Kit Manufacturer^{1} | Shirt Sponsor^{1} |
|---|---|---|---|---|
| Ajaccio | (France) Olivier Pantaloni | (France) Thierry Debès | Duarig | Géant |
| Angers | (France) Jean-Louis Garcia | (France) Grégory Malicki | Umbro | Next Generation |
| Boulogne | (France) Michel Estevan | (France) Grégory Thil | Uhlsport | Boostyle |
| Châteauroux | (France) Didier Tholot | (France) Vincent Fernandez | Nike | Le Seyec |
| Clermont | (Armenia) Michel Der Zakarian | (France) Michaël Fabre | Kappa | Clermont-Ferrand |
| Dijon | (France) Patrice Carteron | (Uruguay) Sebastián Ribas | Nike | Sita-Suez |
| Évian | (France) Bernard Casoni | (France) Cédric Barbosa | Duarig | Direct 8 |
| Grenoble | (France) Yvon Pouliquen | (France) Nicolas Dieuze | Nike | Flash Kado |
| Istres | (France) José Pasqualetti | (France) Gary Coulibaly | Duarig | Kertel |
| Laval | (France) Philippe Hinschberger | (France) Johann Chapuis | Duarig | Lactel |
| Le Havre | (France) Cédric Daury | (Morocco) Hassane Alla | Airness | System U |
| Le Mans | (France) Arnaud Cormier | (Gabon) Didier Ovono | Kappa | LOUÉ |
| Nantes | (France) Philippe Anziani | (France) Stéphane Darbion | Kappa | Profil+ |
| Nîmes | (France) Thierry Froger | (France) Benoît Poulain | Erreà | Mac Dan |
| Metz | (France) Dominique Bijotat | (France) Romain Brégerie | Kappa | Peugeot |
| Reims | (France) Hubert Fournier | (France) Cédric Fauré | Lotto | IDEC |
| Sedan | (France) Landry Chauvin | (France) Jérôme Lemoigne | Nike | Invicta |
| Tours | (France) Daniel Sanchez | (France) Julien Cardy | Duarig | Rica Lewis Groupe |
| Troyes | (France) Jean-Marc Furlan | (France) Gaël Sanz | Duarig | Urbanéo |
| Vannes | (France) Stéphane Le Mignan | (Cameroon) Patrick Leugueun | Adidas | Breizh Cola |

^{1} Subject to change during the season.

=== Managerial changes ===
| Team | Outgoing manager | Manner of departure | Date of vacancy | Table | Incoming manager | Date of appointment | Table |
|---|---|---|---|---|---|---|---|
| Reims | (France) Marc Collat | Mutual consent | 16 May 2010 | Off-season | (France) Hubert Fournier | 18 May 2010 | Off-season |
| Châteauroux | (France) Jean-Pierre Papin | Resigned | 18 May 2010 | Off-season | (France) Didier Tholot | 1 June 2010 | Off-season |
| Metz | (France) Joël Muller | Mutual consent | 14 May 2010 | Off-season | (France) Dominique Bijotat | 4 June 2010 | Off-season |
| Troyes | (France) Patrick Rémy | Mutual consent | 22 June 2010 | Off-season | (France) Jean-Marc Furlan | 23 June 2010 | Off-season |

==== In-season ====
| Team | Outgoing manager | Manner of departure | Date of vacancy | Table | Incoming manager | Date of appointment | Table |
|---|---|---|---|---|---|---|---|
| Grenoble | (Bosnia and Herzegovina) Mehmed Baždarević | Mutual consent | 1 September 2010 | 20th | (France) Yvon Pouliquen | 6 September 2010 | 20th |
| Nîmes | (France) Jean-Michel Cavalli | Contract terminated | 8 November 2010 | 17th | (France) Noël Tosi | 8 November 2010 | 17th |
| Boulogne | (France) Laurent Guyot | Contract terminated | 27 December 2010 | 12th | (France) Michel Estevan | 30 December 2010 | 12th |
| Nîmes | (France) Noël Tosi | Contract terminated | 2 March 2011 | 17th | (France) Thierry Froger | 2 March 2011 | 17th |
| Nantes | (France) Baptiste Gentili | Resigned | 6 March 2011 | 15th | (France) Philippe Anziani | 6 March 2011 | 15th |

== League table ==
| Pos | Team | Pld | W | D | L | GF | GA | GD | Pts | Promotion or Relegation |
|---|---|---|---|---|---|---|---|---|---|---|
| 1 | Évian (C, P) | 38 | 18 | 13 | 7 | 63 | 41 | +22 | 67 | Promotion to Ligue 1 |
| 2 | Ajaccio (P) | 38 | 17 | 13 | 8 | 45 | 37 | +8 | 64 | Promotion to Ligue 1 |
| 3 | Dijon (P) | 38 | 17 | 11 | 10 | 55 | 40 | +15 | 62 | Promotion to Ligue 1 |
| 4 | Le Mans | 38 | 17 | 11 | 10 | 48 | 37 | +11 | 62 | |
| 5 | Sedan | 38 | 15 | 14 | 9 | 57 | 37 | +20 | 59 | |
| 6 | Angers | 38 | 14 | 15 | 9 | 41 | 32 | +9 | 57 | |
| 7 | Clermont | 38 | 12 | 16 | 10 | 51 | 49 | +2 | 52 | |
| 8 | Boulogne | 38 | 13 | 13 | 12 | 35 | 41 | −6 | 52 | |
| 9 | Le Havre | 38 | 12 | 13 | 13 | 43 | 38 | +5 | 49 | |
| 10 | Reims | 38 | 12 | 13 | 13 | 53 | 51 | +2 | 49 | |
| 11 | Istres | 38 | 12 | 13 | 13 | 45 | 47 | −2 | 49 | |
| 12 | Tours | 38 | 13 | 10 | 15 | 52 | 59 | −7 | 49 | |
| 13 | Nantes | 38 | 11 | 14 | 13 | 38 | 40 | −2 | 47 | |
| 14 | Châteauroux | 38 | 12 | 11 | 15 | 41 | 47 | −6 | 47 | |
| 15 | Laval | 38 | 11 | 14 | 13 | 36 | 43 | −7 | 47 | |
| 16 | Troyes | 38 | 13 | 7 | 18 | 35 | 45 | −10 | 46 | |
| 17 | Metz | 38 | 10 | 15 | 13 | 43 | 40 | +3 | 45 | |
| 18 | Vannes (R) | 38 | 12 | 8 | 18 | 39 | 61 | −22 | 44 | Relegation to Championnat National |
| 19 | Nîmes (R) | 38 | 9 | 10 | 19 | 35 | 46 | −11 | 37 | Relegation to Championnat National |
| 20 | Grenoble (R, D) | 38 | 7 | 12 | 19 | 36 | 60 | −24 | 33 | Resigned to the National 3 (Note: On 26 May 2011, following a preliminary review of each club's administrative and financial accounts in the Championnat National, the DNCG ruled that Pacy Vallée-d'Eure, Strasbourg, Gap, Grenoble, and Cannes would be relegated to the Championnat de France amateur after the organisation determined that the clubs were enduring financial difficulties. The clubs had the option to appeal the ruling. On 24 June 2011, Pacy Vallée-d'Eure officials confirmed in a press conference that it would accept its relegation to the fourth division in an effort to smooth over its €350,000 debt into next year. Two weeks later, Grenoble confirmed on its website that the Appeals Board of the DNCG had informed club officials that it will be relegated to the fourth division. Grenoble, subsequently, entered liquidation on 7 July. On 13 July, Grenoble's relegation was validated after the French Football Federation confirmed via letter to SAS Épinal that the club would be replacing Grenoble in the Championnat National. On 8 July 2011, the Appeals Board of the DNCG confirmed that both Strasbourg and Gap would remain relegated after the clubs failed to convince the board of its intent to fix its financial liabilities. Strasbourg has a deficit of over €4 million, while Gap's debt has exceeded over €80,000. Following the appeal denial, Gap officials announced that the club would appeal to the CNOSF, the National Sporting Committee of France. On 18 July, despite both clubs still having the option to appeal the DNCG rulings, the Ligue du Football Amateur (LFA) announced that Red Star and Cherbourg would replace Strasbourg and Gap, respectively, for the 2011–12 edition of the Championnat National. On the following day, Cannes had its appeal to remain in the Championnat National rejected by the DNCG. Similar to Gap, following the decision, Cannes announced its intent to appeal the ruling at the CNOSF. On 29 July, the CNOSF gave a favourable ruling for Cannes recommending to the federation that Cannes should remain in the third division. On 3 August, the CNOSF ruled Gap confirmed the demotion of Gap to the Championnat de France amateur. The French Football Federation determined whether Cannes would be allowed to participate in the league on 4 August, one day before the season was set to begin at the federation's annual executive meeting. At the meeting, the Federation re-affirmed its decision to relegate Cannes to the CFA stating it "trust the DNCG and followed its decisions".) |

Source: Ligue 2
Rules for classification: 1) points; 2) goal difference; 3) number of goals scored.
(C) Champions; (D) Disqualified; (P) Promoted; (R) Relegated

== Results ==
| Home \ Away | ACA | ANG | BOU | CHA | CLR | DIJ | EVI | GRE | IST | LVL | LHA | MFC | MET | NAN | NMS | REI | SED | TOU | TRO | VAN |
|---|---|---|---|---|---|---|---|---|---|---|---|---|---|---|---|---|---|---|---|---|
| Ajaccio | | 1–0 | 2–0 | 1–1 | 1–0 | 1–0 | 1–0 | 1–0 | 2–0 | 1–1 | 2–1 | 0–0 | 0–0 | 2–3 | 1–0 | 3–0 | 0–0 | 2–0 | 3–0 | 3–0 |
| Angers | 3–1 | | 0–0 | 2–1 | 1–0 | 1–0 | 3–0 | 2–2 | 1–1 | 2–0 | 0–0 | 1–3 | 0–0 | 1–1 | 2–0 | 0–1 | 0–3 | 2–2 | 3–0 | 3–0 |
| Boulogne | 0–1 | 2–1 | | 3–2 | 1–1 | 0–1 | 1–2 | 2–0 | 2–0 | 0–0 | 1–1 | 1–0 | 0–2 | 0–0 | 2–1 | 1–0 | 1–0 | 3–2 | 2–0 | 0–1 |
| Châteauroux | 1–2 | 1–2 | 1–1 | | 3–1 | 0–3 | 0–1 | 4–3 | 0–0 | 1–0 | 2–1 | 1–2 | 1–0 | 0–0 | 1–1 | 2–0 | 1–0 | 3–0 | 1–0 | 0–2 |
| Clermont | 2–0 | 1–2 | 1–0 | 0–1 | | 2–2 | 3–3 | 2–2 | 2–0 | 2–0 | 2–1 | 0–0 | 1–1 | 2–1 | 2–0 | 1–1 | 1–1 | 3–1 | 2–2 | 1–0 |
| Dijon | 1–1 | 0–0 | 1–1 | 3–1 | 0–1 | | 5–1 | 2–1 | 0–1 | 2–0 | 0–0 | 3–2 | 2–1 | 0–0 | 1–0 | 3–2 | 1–1 | 3–2 | 0–1 | 4–1 |
| Évian | 1–1 | 0–0 | 0–0 | 1–0 | 1–1 | 0–2 | | 2–0 | 3–2 | 3–0 | 1–1 | 3–0 | 4–3 | 3–0 | 1–0 | 1–2 | 2–2 | 1–2 | 3–0 | 4–0 |
| Grenoble | 1–1 | 0–2 | 2–2 | 1–1 | 2–2 | 3–1 | 1–1 | | 0–2 | 1–2 | 1–0 | 0–1 | 1–0 | 2–0 | 1–0 | 1–1 | 1–1 | 2–2 | 0–2 | 1–2 |
| Istres | 2–2 | 1–1 | 0–1 | 5–3 | 2–2 | 1–1 | 1–1 | 0–1 | | 0–1 | 0–2 | 0–0 | 2–3 | 2–1 | 0–0 | 2–0 | 5–3 | 1–0 | 2–0 | 3–0 |
| Laval | 0–0 | 1–1 | 4–0 | 1–1 | 1–1 | 2–0 | 2–2 | 3–0 | 0–0 | | 2–1 | 2–1 | 1–0 | 0–0 | 1–0 | 1–2 | 3–0 | 2–2 | 0–0 | 1–0 |
| Le Havre | 2–0 | 1–0 | 2–0 | 1–0 | 1–0 | 2–1 | 0–0 | 5–0 | 1–2 | 1–0 | | 1–1 | 2–1 | 0–1 | 0–0 | 2–1 | 1–1 | 4–3 | 1–2 | 3–4 |
| Le Mans | 3–1 | 0–0 | 1–1 | 0–2 | 2–0 | 2–2 | 1–3 | 1–0 | 1–0 | 4–0 | 1–0 | | 0–0 | 3–2 | 1–1 | 2–2 | 1–1 | 3–0 | 1–0 | 0–1 |
| Metz | 2–2 | 1–1 | 3–1 | 0–0 | 3–3 | 3–1 | 0–2 | 0–1 | 0–0 | 4–0 | 2–0 | 0–1 | | 1–1 | 3–0 | 0–0 | 0–0 | 1–0 | 0–1 | 1–0 |
| Nantes | 2–0 | 2–0 | 1–2 | 1–1 | 2–0 | 1–1 | 0–1 | 2–1 | 2–1 | 1–1 | 2–1 | 0–2 | 0–0 | | 2–1 | 1–1 | 0–0 | 0–0 | 0–1 | 2–0 |
| Nîmes | 1–2 | 2–0 | 0–1 | 1–1 | 1–2 | 0–2 | 1–3 | 1–0 | 2–0 | 0–0 | 1–1 | 1–2 | 2–0 | 2–2 | | 2–2 | 2–0 | 2–3 | 1–0 | 2–1 |
| Reims | 1–1 | 2–0 | 4–1 | 1–1 | 1–3 | 1–2 | 1–2 | 4–1 | 0–0 | 1–1 | 2–1 | 3–0 | 2–2 | 2–1 | 1–1 | | 1–0 | 4–1 | 0–1 | 3–1 |
| Sedan | 4–1 | 0–1 | 1–1 | 2–0 | 4–0 | 0–0 | 1–4 | 1–0 | 5–1 | 2–0 | 1–1 | 2–1 | 3–1 | 3–1 | 1–0 | 0–0 | | 1–0 | 1–1 | 4–0 |
| Tours | 2–2 | 1–1 | 2–0 | 2–0 | 3–2 | 0–1 | 1–0 | 2–2 | 2–3 | 2–0 | 0–0 | 0–1 | 2–2 | 2–1 | 0–2 | 2–1 | 4–3 | | 1–0 | 2–0 |
| Troyes | 3–0 | 1–2 | 1–1 | 3–1 | 1–1 | 2–0 | 1–1 | 2–0 | 0–1 | 3–2 | 0–0 | 0–1 | 2–1 | 0–2 | 1–3 | 3–2 | 0–2 | 1–2 | | 0–1 |
| Vannes | 0–1 | 0–0 | 0–0 | 0–1 | 1–1 | 2–4 | 2–2 | 1–1 | 2–2 | 2–1 | 1–1 | 4–3 | 1–2 | 1–0 | 3–1 | 4–1 | 0–3 | 0–0 | 1–0 | |

Source: Ligue 2
Legend: Blue = home team win; Yellow = draw; Red = away team win.

== Statistics ==
=== Top goalscorers ===
| Rank | Player | Club | Goals |
|---|---|---|---|
| 1 | (Uruguay) Sebastián Ribas | Dijon | 23 |
| 2 | (Norway) Thorstein Helstad | Le Mans | 21 |
| 3 | (France) Sloan Privat | Clermont | 20 |
| 4 | (France) Julien Toudic | Reims | 16 |
| 5 | (France) Grégory Thil | Boulogne | 15 |
| 6 | (Algeria) Nassim Akrour | Istres | 14 |
| 7 | (Ivory Coast) Guie Abraham | Tours | 13 |
| 7 | (Guadeloupe) Brice Jovial | Le Havre | 13 |
| 9 | (Serbia) Filip Đorđević | Nantes | 12 |
| 9 | (France) Jean-François Rivière | Ajaccio | 12 |
| 9 | (France) Richard Socrier | Ajaccio | 12 |
| 9 | (France) Jérôme Lebouc | Laval | 12 |

Last updated: 25 May 2011
Source: Official Goalscorers' Standings

=== Assists table ===
| Rank | Player | Club | Assists |
|---|---|---|---|
| 1 | (France) Rudy Haddad | Châteauroux | 10 |
| 2 | (France) Lossémy Karaboué | Sedan | 9 |
| 3 | (France) Kevin Lejeune | Tours | 8 |
| 3 | (France) Jérôme Lebouc | Laval | 8 |
| 3 | (Democratic Republic of the Congo) Christian Kinkela | Ajaccio | 8 |
| 6 | (France) Romain Alessandrini | Clermont | 7 |
| 6 | (France) Johan Cavalli | Ajaccio | 7 |
| 6 | (Romania) Claudiu Keșerü | Angers | 7 |
| 9 | (France) Vincent Gragnic | Reims | 6 |

Last updated: 25 May 2011
Source: Official Assists' Table

== Awards ==
=== Yearly ===
The nominees for the Ligue 2 Player of the Year, Goalkeeper of the Year, and Manager of the Year. The winners were determine at the annual UNFP Awards, which was held on 22 May. The winners will be displayed in bold.

==== Ligue 2 Player of the Year ====
| Player | Nationality | Club |
|---|---|---|
| Benjamin Corgnet | France | Dijon |
| Rudy Haddad | France | Châteauroux |
| Sloan Privat | France | Clermont |
| **Sebastián Ribas** | Uruguay | Dijon |

==== Goalkeeper of the Year ====
| Player | Nationality | Club |
|---|---|---|
| **Benoît Costil** | France | Sedan |
| Bertrand Laquait | France | Évian |
| Grégory Malicki | France | Angers |
| Johny Placide | Haiti | Le Havre |

==== Manager of the Year ====
| Player | Nationality | Club |
|---|---|---|
| Patrice Carteron | France | Dijon |
| **Bernard Casoni** | France | Évian |
| Landry Chauvin | France | Sedan |
| Olivier Pantaloni | France | Ajaccio |

==== Team of the Year ====
| Position | | Player | Club |
|---|---|---|---|
| GK | (France) | Benoît Costil | Sedan |
| RB | (France) | Sébastien Corchia | Le Mans |
| CB | (France) | Grégory Cerdan | Le Mans |
| CB | (France) | Benjamin Genton | Le Havre |
| LB | (France) | Cédric Fabien | Boulogne |
| CM | (France) | Romain Alessandrini | Clermont |
| CM | (France) | Olivier Sorlin | Evian |
| AM | (France) | Rudy Haddad | Châteauroux |
| AM | (France) | Benjamin Corgnet | Dijon |
| FW | (Uruguay) | Sebastian Ribas | Dijon |
| FW | (France) | Sloan Privat | Clermont |

== Attendances ==
| # | Club | Average | Highest |
|---|---|---|---|
| 1 | Nantes | 11,444 | 17,400 |
| 2 | Le Mans | 10,322 | 24,375 |
| 3 | Troyes | 9,368 | 17,093 |
| 4 | Metz | 9,150 | 24,482 |
| 5 | Sedan | 8,975 | 19,199 |
| 6 | Reims | 8,940 | 17,037 |
| 7 | Boulogne | 8,834 | 12,726 |
| 8 | Dijon | 7,457 | 14,405 |
| 9 | Le Havre | 7,296 | 9,012 |
| 10 | Angers | 6,485 | 10,576 |
| 11 | Nîmes | 6,474 | 7,567 |
| 12 | Châteauroux | 6,142 | 9,086 |
| 13 | Tours | 6,109 | 10,052 |
| 14 | Stade lavallois | 5,654 | 8,395 |
| 15 | Évian | 5,555 | 12,298 |
| 16 | Grenoble | 5,251 | 6,370 |
| 17 | Clermont | 4,180 | 6,438 |
| 18 | Vannes | 3,841 | 6,215 |
| 19 | Ajaccio | 3,422 | 4,555 |
| 20 | Istres | 1,874 | 2,784 |
