= Alexis Allart =

French footballer (born 1986)

Personal information
- Date of birth: 7 August 1986 (age 40)
- Place of birth: Charleville-Mézières, France
- Height: 1.80 m (5 ft 11 in)
- Position: Forward

Team information
- Current team: USL Dunkerque

Senior career*
Years	Team	Apps	(Gls)
2003–2006	Monaco	0	(0)
2006–2007	CS Louhans-Cuiseaux	35	(18)
2007–2008	Excelsior Mouscron	2	(0)
2008–2011	Sedan	108	(36)
2011–2013	Boulogne	41	(15)
2012–2013	→ Châteauroux (loan)	16	(1)
2013–2014	Istres	10	(1)
2015	Boulogne	4	(0)
2015–2016	CA Bastia	4	(2)
2016	TOT SC	0	(0)
2016–2017	AS Vitré	12	(6)
2017–	USL Dunkerque	4	(2)

International career
2001–2002	France Under 16	3	(1)
2002–2003	France Under 17	4	(2)
- * Club domestic league appearances and goals as of 10 January 2016

Alexis Allart (born 7 August 1986) is a French footballer who plays as a forward for USL Dunkerque of the Championnat National.

== Career statistics ==
As of match played 12 January 2018

Appearances and goals by club, season and competition
Club	Season	League			National Cup		League Cup		Total	
Club	Season	Division	Apps	Goals	Apps	Goals	Apps	Goals	Apps	Goals
Louhans-Cuiseaux	2006–07	National	35	18	1	0	0	0	36	18
Excelsior Mouscron	2007–08	Belgian Pro League	2	0	0	0	—		2	0
Sedan	2007–08	Ligue 2	13	4	4	0	0	0	17	4
Sedan	2008–09	Ligue 2	29	9	6	3	0	0	35	12
Sedan	2009–10	Ligue 2	36	13	3	2	5	3	44	18
Sedan	2010–11	Ligue 2	30	10	4	0	1	0	35	10
Sedan	Total		108	36	17	5	6	3	131	44
Boulogne	2011–12	Ligue 2	36	12	3	3	1	1	40	16
Boulogne	2012–13	National	5	3	0	0	1	0	6	3
Boulogne	Total		41	15	3	3	2	1	46	19
Châteauroux (loan)	2012–13	Ligue 2	16	1	2	2	0	0	18	3
Istres	2013–14	Ligue 2	10	1	2	0	1	0	13	1
Boulogne	2015–16	National	4	0	0	0	0	0	4	0
Bastia	2015–16	National	4	2	0	0	0	0	4	2
Vitré	2016–17	CFA	12	6	0	0	—		12	6
Dunkerque	2016–17	National	10	3	0	0	0	0	10	3
Dunkerque	2017–18	National	10	0	3	0	0	0	13	0
Dunkerque	Total		20	3	3	0	0	0	23	3
Dunkerque II	2017–18	National 3	2	2	—		—		2	2
Career totals			264	84	28	10	9	4	291	98
