= Massamba Sambou =

Senegalese footballer

Personal information
- Full name: Massamba Lô Sambou
- Date of birth: 17 September 1986 (age 40)
- Place of birth: Kolda, Senegal
- Height: 1.88 m (6 ft 2 in)
- Position: Defender

Youth career
- 2004–2006: Monaco

Senior career*
Years	Team	Apps	(Gls)
2006–2010	Monaco	16	(3)
2008–2009	→ Le Havre (loan)	19	(2)
2009–2010	→ Nantes (loan)	18	(2)
2010–2011	Atromitos	17	(1)
2011	Troyes	21	(1)
2012–2014	Châteauroux	36	(1)
2014	NorthEast United	6	(2)
2015–2016	AEL Limassol	22	(1)
2018–2019	FK Valmiera		
2019–2020	Ulaanbaatar City		
2021	Taichung Futuro	8	(1)

International career
2007	Senegal	1	(0)
- * Club domestic league appearances and goals

Massamba Lô Sambou (born 17 September 1986) is a Senegalese professional footballer who last played for Taichung Futuro.

== Career ==
Born in Kolda, Sambou can play in central defense, but also as a defensive midfielder. In 2006, he signed its first professional contract with his formative club, Monaco. He played in the 2008–09 season for Le Havre on loan from Monaco. On 11 June 2010, left FC Nantes and signed a three-year contract with Greek side Atromitos.

On 8 July 2011, he joined French Ligue 2 club Troyes on a two-year contract, but was released in a one month. In January 2012 he signed a contract with LB Châteauroux until June 2013.

== International career ==
In 2007, he was called up for the first time to the Senegal national football team.

== Club statistics ==
As of match played on 4 March 2015

Appearances and goals by club, season and competition
Club	Season	League			Cup		Other		Total	
Club	Season	Division	Apps	Goals	Apps	Goals	Apps	Goals	Apps	Goals
Monaco	2006–07	Ligue 1	4	0	0	0	—		4	0
Monaco	2007–08	Ligue 1	12	3	1	0	—		13	3
Le Havre (loan)	2008–09	Ligue 1	19	2	2	0	—		21	2
Nantes (loan)	2009–10	Ligue 2	19	2	0	0	—		19	2
Atromitos	2010–11	Super League Greece	17	1	4	0	—		21	1
Châteauroux	2011–12	Ligue 2	10	0	0	0	—		10	0
Châteauroux	2012–13	Ligue 2	14	0	2	0	—		16	0
Châteauroux	2013–14	Ligue 2	12	1	1	0	—		13	1
NorthEast United FC	2014	Indian Super League	6	2	—		—		6	2
AEL Limassol	2014–15	Cypriot First Division	12	1	6	0	—		18	1
Career total			120	12	14	0	0	0	134	12
