= Grégory Malicki =

French footballer (born 1973)

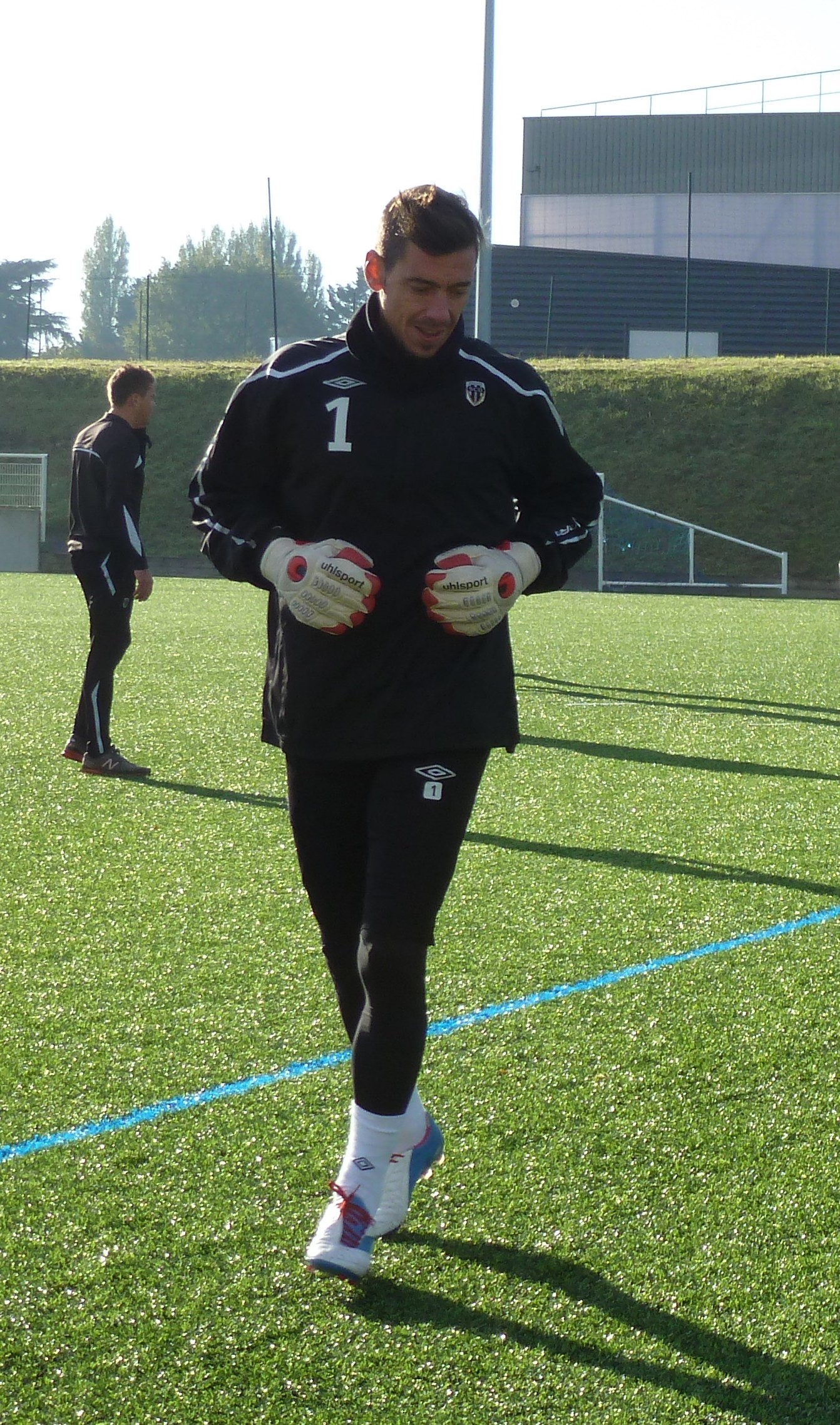

Personal information
- Date of birth: 23 November 1973 (age 52)
- Place of birth: Thiais, France
- Height: 1.87 m (6 ft 2 in)
- Position: Goalkeeper

Senior career*
Years	Team	Apps	(Gls)
1995–1999	Chamois Niortais	134	(0)
1999–2002	Rennes	9	(0)
1999–2000	→ US Créteil (loan)	16	(0)
2000–2001	→ LB Châteauroux (loan)	36	(0)
2001–2002	→ Lille (loan)	2	(0)
2002–2009	Lille	67	(0)
2009–2010	Dijon	33	(0)
2010–2014	Angers	130	(0)
Total		427	(0)
- * Club domestic league appearances and goals

Grégory Malicki (born 23 November 1973) is a French former professional footballer. He last played for Angers SCO as a goalkeeper, also acting as club captain.

== Career statistics ==
Appearances and goals by club, season and competition
Club	Season	League			National cup		League cup		Europe		Total	
Club	Season	Division	Apps	Goals	Apps	Goals	Apps	Goals	Apps	Goals	Apps	Goals
Chamois Niortais	1995–96	Division 2	16	0	1	0	1	0	—		18	0
Chamois Niortais	1996–97	Division 2	41	0	0	0	2	0	—		43	0
Chamois Niortais	1997–98	Division 2	41	0	1	0	2	0	—		44	0
Chamois Niortais	1998–99	Division 2	36	0	1	0	2	0	—		39	0
Chamois Niortais	Total		134	0	3	0	7	0	—		144	0
Rennes	1999–2000	Division 1	9	0	—		0	0	6	0	15	0
Rennes	2001–02	Division 1	0	0	—		—		—		0	0
Rennes	Total		9	0	—		0	0	6	0	15	0
US Créteil (loan)	1999–2000	Division 2	16	0	0	0	—		—		16	0
LB Châteauroux (loan)	2000–01	Division 2	36	0	0	0	0	0	—		36	0
Lille (loan)	2001–02	Division 1	2	0	0	0	1	0	0	0	3	0
Lille	2002–03	Ligue 1	8	0	2	0	0	0	0	0	10	0
Lille	2003–04	Ligue 1	4	0	0	0	2	0	—		6	0
Lille	2004–05	Ligue 1	1	0	2	0	2	0	0	0	5	0
Lille	2005–06	Ligue 1	6	0	4	0	2	0	1	0	13	0
Lille	2006–07	Ligue 1	6	0	3	0	2	0	2	0	13	0
Lille	2007–08	Ligue 1	8	0	2	0	1	0	—		11	0
Lille	2008–09	Ligue 1	34	0	0	0	0	0	—		34	0
Lille	Lille total		69	0	13	0	10	0	3	0	95	0
Dijon	2009–10	Ligue 2	33	0	2	0	1	0	—		36	0
Angers	2010–11	Ligue 2	27	0	6	0	1	0	—		34	0
Angers	2011–12	Ligue 2	34	0	2	0	1	0	—		37	0
Angers	2012–13	Ligue 2	37	0	2	0	0	0	—		39	0
Angers	2013–14	Ligue 2	32	0	4	0	0	0	—		36	0
Angers	Total		130	0	14	0	2	0	—		146	0
Career total			427	0	32	0	20	0	9	0	488	0

== Honours ==
Lille

- UEFA Intertoto Cup: 2004
