= Hubert Fournier =

French footballer and manager (born 1967)

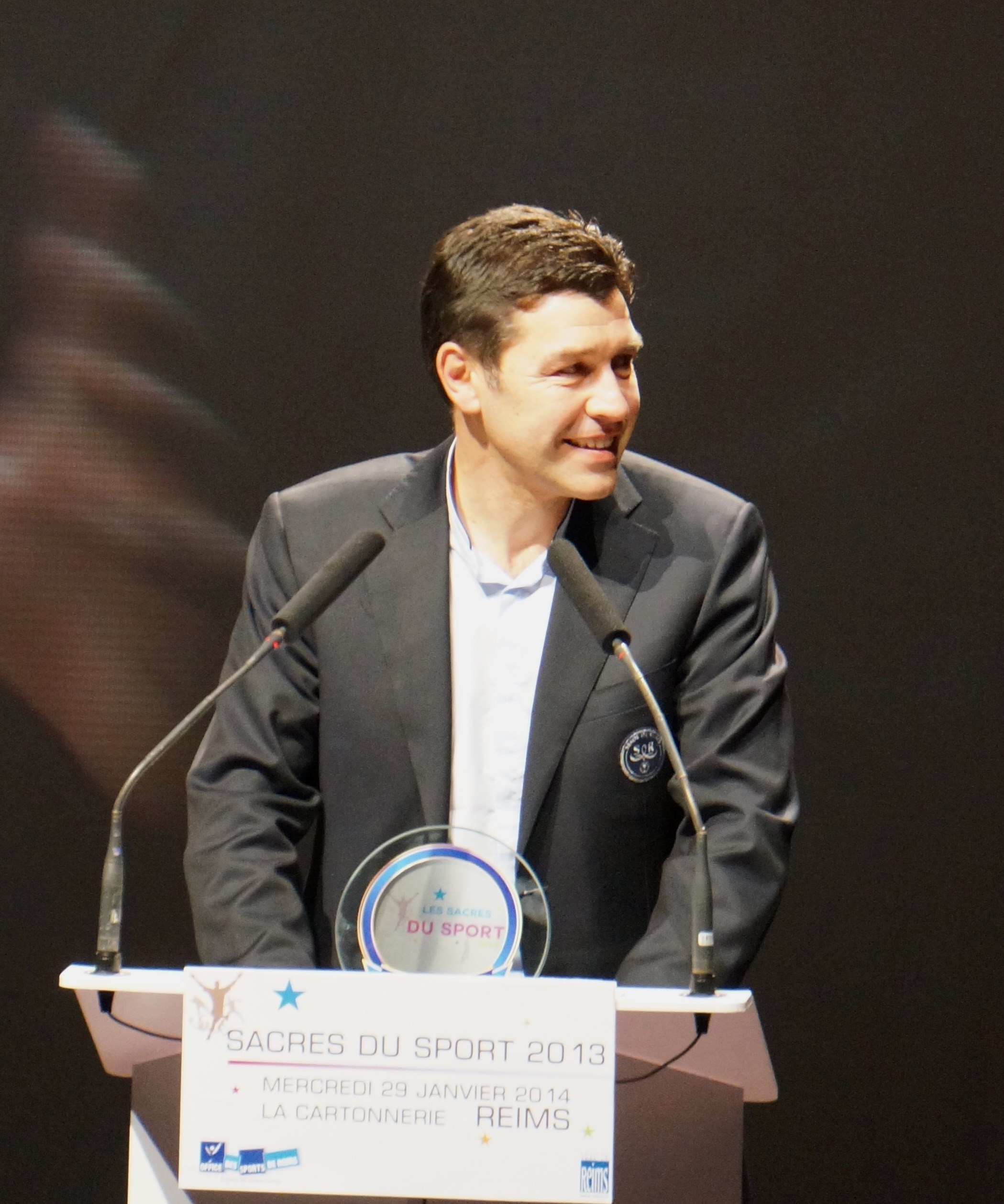
- Fournier with Reims in 2013

Personal information
- Full name: Hubert Fournier
- Date of birth: 3 September 1967 (age 59)
- Place of birth: Riom, France
- Height: 1.83 m (6 ft 0 in)
- Position: Defender

Youth career
- INF Vichy

Senior career*
Years	Team	Apps	(Gls)
1988–1989	Maubeuge		
1989–1993	Caen	97	(2)
1993–1996	Guingamp	118	(1)
1996–1998	Borussia Mönchengladbach	36	(0)
1998–2000	Lyon	58	(0)
2000–2002	Guingamp	63	(1)
2002–2004	Rouen	58	(1)

Managerial career
- 2008: Gueugnon
- 2010–2014: Reims
- 2014–2015: Lyon
- * Club domestic league appearances and goals

Hubert Fournier (French pronunciation: [ybɛʁ fuʁnje]; born 3 September 1967) is a French football manager and former player who most recently managed Lyon. He formerly managed Reims between 2010 and 2014, Gueugnon in 2008 and was an assistant coach at Stade de Reims from 2009 to 2010.

== Early life ==
Hubert Fournier was born on 3 September 1967 in Riom, Puy-de-Dôme.

== Managerial career ==
Under his first season (2010–11), Reims finished Ligue 2 as 10th and reached the quarter-final of the Coupe de France. In the following season (2011–12) Reims finished the Ligue 2 as runner-up and returned to Ligue 1 after 33 years.

On 23 May 2014, Fournier was named new manager of Lyon.

On 23 December 2015, Fournier was dismissed as head coach of Lyon, and replaced by Bruno Génésio.

== Managerial statistics ==
As of 19 December 2015

Team	From	To	Record				
Team	From	To	G	W	D	L	Win %
Reims	1 July 2010	30 June 2014	164	57	49	58	34.76
Lyon	1 July 2014	23 December 2015	72	35	15	22	48.61
Total			236	92	64	80	38.98

== Honours ==
Individual

- Onze d'Or Coach of the Year: 2015
