= Julien Cardy =

French footballer (born 1981)

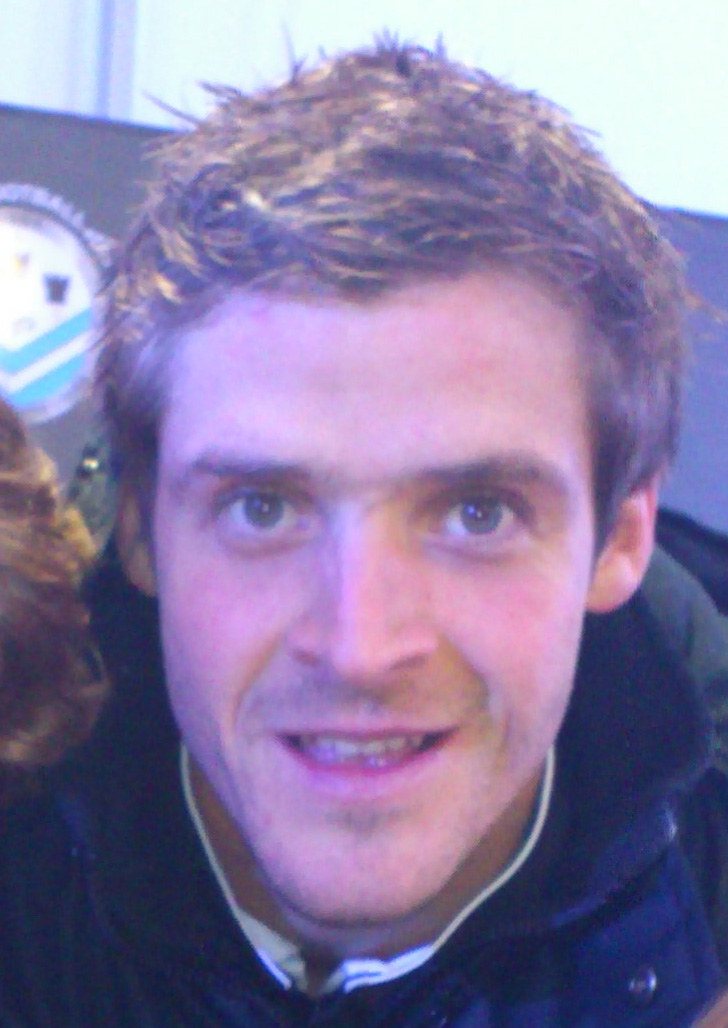
- Cardy in 2012

Personal information
- Date of birth: 29 September 1981 (age 45)
- Place of birth: Pau, France
- Height: 1.76 m (5 ft 9 in)
- Position: Midfielder

Youth career
- 1996–2000: Nantes

Senior career*
Years	Team	Apps	(Gls)
2001–2006	Toulouse	140	(3)
2006–2010	Metz	100	(9)
2010–2012	Tours	64	(6)
2012–2014	Arles-Avignon	54	(2)
2014–2016	Guingamp	16	(0)
Total		374	(20)
- * Club domestic league appearances and goals

Julien Cardy (born 29 September 1981) is a French former professional footballer who played as a midfielder for Toulouse FC, FC Metz, Tours FC, AC Arles-Avignon, and En Avant de Guingamp.

== Career ==
Following his release by En Avant de Guingamp in summer 2016, 35-year-old Cardy had not signed for a new club by October 2016 and he expected to end his profession career.

== Career statistics ==
Appearances and goals by club, season and competition
Club	Season	League			Cup (Note: Includes Coupe de France, Coupe de la Ligue, Trophée des champions)		Total	
Club	Season	Division	Apps	Goals	Apps	Goals	Apps	Goals
Toulouse	2001–02	French Division 2	34	2	1	0	35	2
Toulouse	2002–03	Ligue 2	35	0	2	0	37	0
Toulouse	2003–04	Ligue 1	28	1	2	0	29	1
Toulouse	2004–05	Ligue 1	22	0	2	0	22	0
Toulouse	2005–06	Ligue 1	21	0	2	0	23	0
Toulouse	Total		140	3	9	0	149	3
Metz	2006–07	Ligue 2	36	6	3	1	39	7
Metz	2007–08	Ligue 1	1	0	1	0	2	0
Metz	2008–09	Ligue 2	31	1	5	0	36	1
Metz	2009–10	Ligue 2	32	2	3	0	35	2
Metz	Total		100	9	12	1	112	10
Tours	2010–11	Ligue 2	35	3	2	1	37	4
Tours	2011–12	Ligue 2	29	3	6	1	35	4
Tours	Total		64	6	8	2	72	8
Arles-Avignon	2012–13	Ligue 2	25	1	4	0	29	1
Arles-Avignon	2013–14	Ligue 2	29	1	1	0	30	0
Arles-Avignon	Total		54	2	5	0	59	2
Guingamp	2014–15	Ligue 1	2	0	0	0	2	0
Guingamp	2015–16	Ligue 1	14	0	2	0	16	0
Guingamp	Total		16	0	2	0	18	0
Career total			374	20	36	3	410	25
