= Pierre Mosca =

Italian-born French footballer and coach (born 1945)

Personal information
- Date of birth: 24 July 1945 (age 81)
- Place of birth: Demonte, Italy
- Height: 1.72 m (5 ft 8 in)
- Position: Defender

Youth career
- Lunel

Senior career*
| Years | Team | Apps | (Gls) |
| 1964–1967 | Montpellier | 83 | (2) |
| 1967–1975 | Monaco | 149 | (1) |
| Total | | 232 | (3) |

Managerial career
- 1981–1984: Sochaux
- 1984–1986: Rennes
- 1987–1989: Montpellier
- 1989–1991: Toulouse
- 1991: Sporting Toulon Var
- 1996–1998: Nîmes
- 2006–2007: Aiglon du Lamentin
- 2012–2013: Arles-Avignon (interim)
- * Club domestic league appearances and goals

Pierre Mosca (born Pietro Mosca; 24 July 1945) is a French former football player and coach who played as a defender for Montpellier and Monaco.

After his playing career, he became a coach with Sochaux, Rennes, Montpellier, Toulouse, Toulon, Nîmes and Aiglon du Lamentin.
