= Olivier Pantaloni =

French footballer (born 1966)

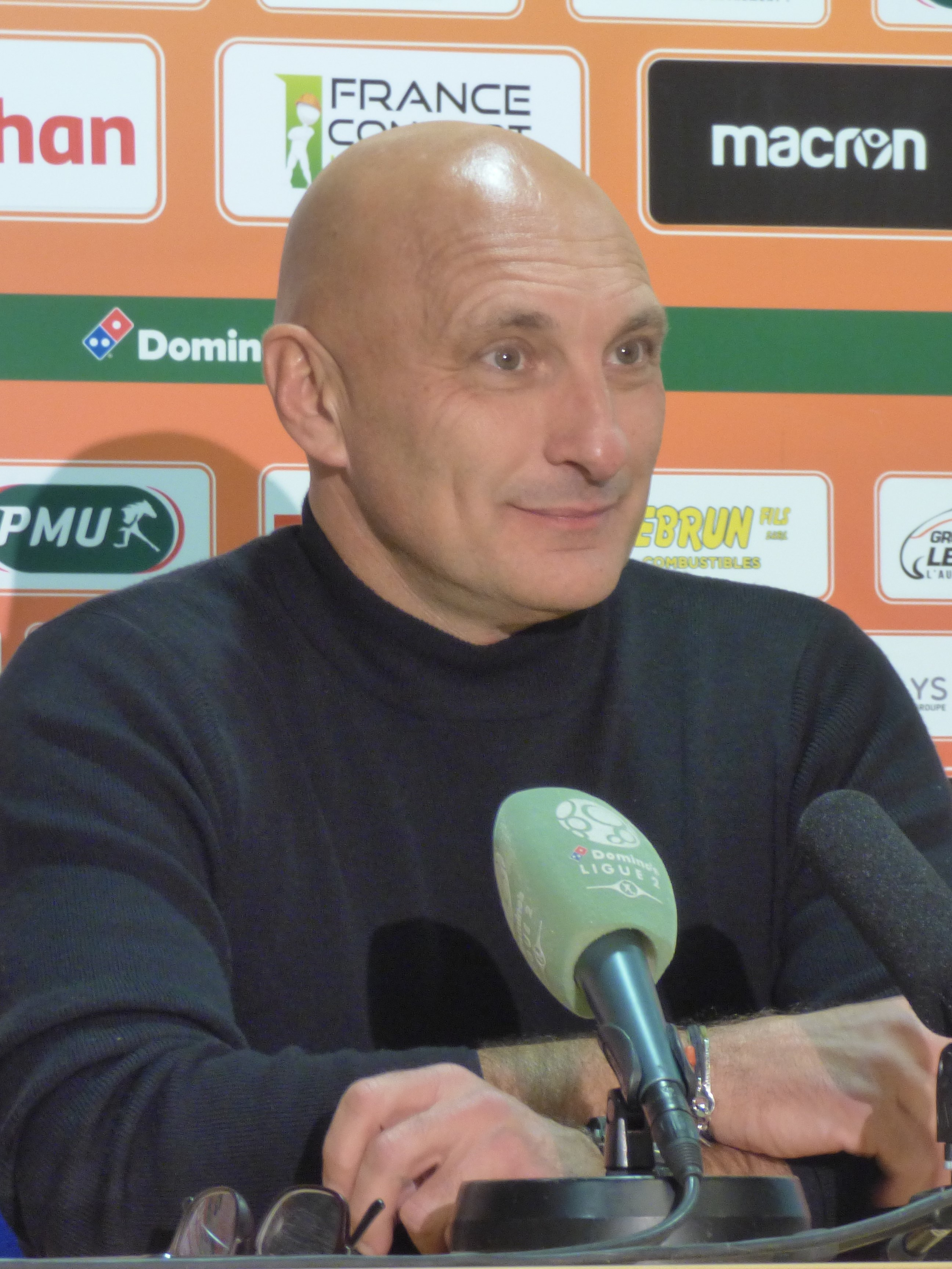
- Pantaloni as Ajaccio manager in 2018

Personal information
- Date of birth: 13 December 1966 (age 59)
- Place of birth: Bastia, France
- Height: 1.82 m (6 ft 0 in)
- Position: Striker

Team information
- Current team: Nice (head coach)

Youth career
- 1976–1981: Gazélec Ajaccio
- 1982–1983: Ajaccio
- 1983–1985: Gazélec Ajaccio
- 1985–1988: Nice

Senior career*
Years	Team	Apps	(Gls)
1988–1990	Bastia	44	(7)
1990–1994	Saint-Étienne	4	(0)
1990–1991	→ Martigues (loan)	29	(6)
1992–1993	→ Gazélec Ajaccio (loan)	20	(2)
1994–2000	Ajaccio	146	(37)
Total		243	(52)

Managerial career
- 2009–2012: Ajaccio
- 2013–2014: Tours
- 2014–2024: Ajaccio
- 2024–2026: Lorient
- 2026–: Nice
- * Club domestic league appearances and goals

Olivier Pantaloni (born 13 December 1966) is a French football manager and former player. He is the current head coach of Ligue 1 club Nice.

== Club career ==
Pantaloni played as a striker for Nice, Bastia, Saint-Étienne, Martigues, Gazélec Ajaccio and Ajaccio.

== Managerial career ==
Pantaloni has held various positions in AC Ajaccio's staff since 2001. When assistant coach in September 2004, he was put in interim charge when Dominique Bijotat was sacked with the team in last place in Ligue 1, and held this position for a month until the appointment of Rolland Courbis.

In December 2008, Pantaloni ended a six-month hiatus by returning to Ligue 2 Ajaccio, being named assistant to José Pasqualetti in the new year and succeeding him upon his resignation in February. In 2010–11, his first full season, he led the club to promotion as runners-up behind Évian TG, ending a five-year exile from the top flight; he resigned in June 2012, having kept them up with a 16th-place finish.

Pantaloni had his first job outside of ACA in June 2013, signing a two-year deal at Ligue 2 club Tours FC. He resigned in October 2014 with the club second from last, having lost eight of eleven fixtures. He returned to familiar surroundings days later, replacing the sacked Christian Bracconi at 12th-place Ajaccio. In 2017–18, he led the club to a promotion play-off place, and they defeated Le Havre before a 4–0 aggregate loss to Toulouse. He led Ajaccio to a 2nd place finish in the 2021–22 season, securing promotion to Ligue 1.

== Managerial statistics ==
As of match played 21 November 2026

Managerial record by team and tenure
Team	From	To	Record				
Team	From	To	P	W	D	L	Win %
Ajaccio	23 February 2009	13 June 2012	140	49	41	50	35.00
Tours	1 July 2013	21 October 2014	55	21	10	24	38.18
Ajaccio	6 November 2014	30 June 2024	386	135	97	154	34.97
Lorient	1 July 2024	17 May 2026	76	39	18	19	51.32
Nice	17 June 2026	present	11	5	2	4	45.45
Total			668	249	168	251	37.28

== Honours ==
=== Manager ===
Lorient

- Ligue 2: 2024–25

Individual

- UNFP Ligue 2 Manager of the Year: 2024–25
