= Jean-Marc Furlan =

French footballer (born 1957)

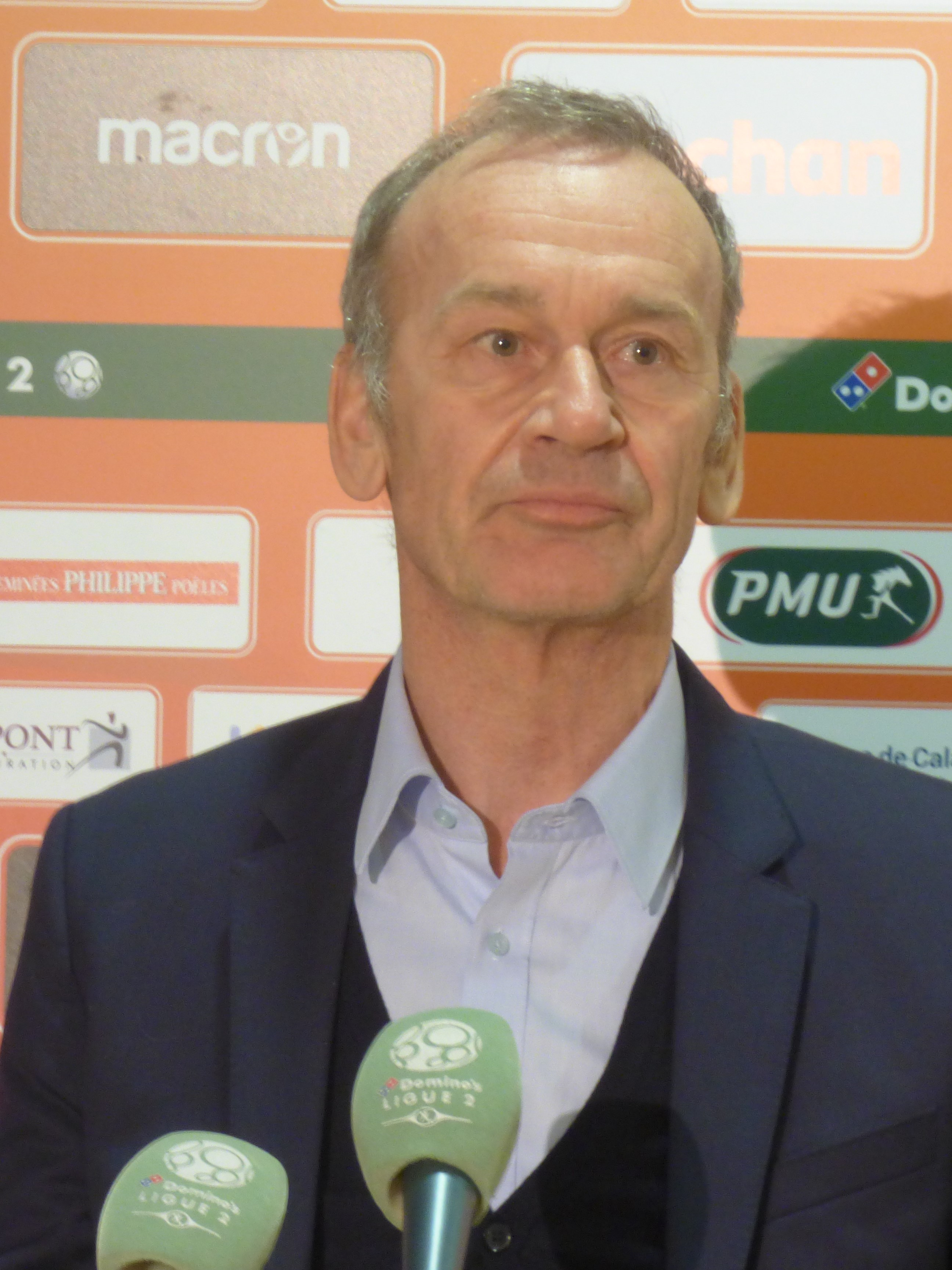
- Furlan in 2018

Personal information
- Date of birth: 20 November 1957 (age 68)
- Place of birth: Sainte-Foy-la-Grande, France
- Height: 1.87 m (6 ft 2 in)
- Position: Defender

Youth career
- 1962–1973: Vélines
- 1973–1976: Bordeaux

Senior career*
Years	Team	Apps	(Gls)
1976–1978	Bordeaux	51	(0)
1978–1979	Montpellier	23	(0)
1979–1980	Laval	25	(0)
1980–1982	Lyon	76	(0)
1982–1985	Tours	106	(3)
1985–1986	Bastia	33	(1)
1986–1987	Montpellier	3	(0)
1987–1988	Arras		
1988–1989	Lens	16	(0)
1989–1992	AS Saint-Seurin	88	(4)
1992–1993	Libourne	10	(0)

Managerial career
- 1993–1997: Libourne (youth)
- 1997–1998: Libourne
- 1998–2004: Libourne
- 2004–2007: Troyes
- 2007–2009: Strasbourg
- 2009–2010: Nantes
- 2010–2015: Troyes
- 2016–2019: Brest
- 2019–2022: Auxerre
- 2023: Caen
- * Club domestic league appearances and goals

Jean-Marc Furlan (born 20 November 1957) is a French football manager and former player who played as a defender.

== Club career ==
Born in Sainte-Foy-la-Grande, Furlan started his career at Bordeaux, where he signed his first professional contract in 1975, winning the Coupe Gambardella one year later. Furlan later also played for Stade Lavallois, Olympique Lyonnais, Tours FC, where he won promotion to the first division in the 1983–84 season, SC Bastia, Montpellier HSC, in which he achieved another promotion to the top-flight in the 1986–87 campaign, RC Lens and Saint-Seurin-sur-l'Isle, retiring there in 1993.

From 1976 to 1993, Furlan played as a sweeper in 420 professional games, 273 in Division 1 and 147 in Division 2.

== Managerial career ==
=== Libourne ===
After retirement, Furlan later opened a sport shop. He felt the need to share his football passion and did so by volunteering as a coach for his son's little league team. His aim was to develop the talent of young players. Due to financial difficulties, the club merged into Libourne/Saint-Seurin and started over in CFA 2 (fifth tier).

Satisfied with the results of the Libourne youth team, Furlan was asked to manage the first-team squad from 1997 to 2004. This was a success; four consecutive seasons, he guided Libourne to the round of 32 in the Coupe de France, eliminating Ligue 1 teams such as Olympique Lyonnais and FC Metz and making it to the quarter-finals. At the same time, Furlan achieved promotion from CFA 2 (fifth tier) to CFA (fourth tier) and then the National (third tier).

=== Troyes ===
Furlan's performances as a manager drew the attention of several professional teams. He signed his first professional contract as a manager with Ligue 2 side Troyes AC in the 2004–05 season. His first season was very successful as Troyes was promoted to Ligue 1 and awarded Manager of the Year.

=== Strasbourg ===
Furlan was appointed manager of Strasbourg from 2007 to 2009.

=== Nantes ===
Furlan took over as the new manager of Nantes in the 2009–10 season.

=== Return to Troyes ===
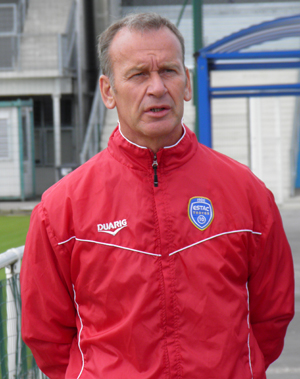
Furlan during his time as Troyes manager in June 2011

In the 2010–11 season, Furlan returned to Troyes and the team was promoted to Ligue 1 the following season. Again in the 2014–15 season, Furlan easily led the side to promotion to Ligue 1, with four games before the end of the season, as well as winning its first national title, Ligue 2. He left the club on 3 December 2015.

=== Brest ===
On 30 May 2016, Furlan became the new manager of Stade Brestois 29 for three years after Alex Dupont, the previous manager, failed to bring them back up to Ligue 1 after three years in command.

On 17 May 2019, after Furlan had led Brest to a Ligue 1 promotion, his contract ran out.

=== Auxerre ===
Furlan signed with Ligue 2 side Auxerre the same day.

=== Caen ===
On 14 June 2023, Furlan was appointed as the manager of Ligue 2 club Caen, signing a two-year contract. He succeeded Stéphane Moulin. Caen won the first four Ligue 2 games under his helm. After three draws and six losses in the next games, Furlan was fired on 7 November 2023.

== Managerial statistics ==
As of match played 4 November 2023

Managerial record by team and tenure
Team	From	To	Record							
Team	From	To	G	W	D	L	GF	GA	GD	Win %
Troyes	14 June 2004	1 June 2007	123	39	34	50	148	170	−22	31.71
Strasbourg	12 June 2007	3 June 2009	82	28	20	34	100	111	−11	34.15
Nantes	3 December 2009	20 February 2010	9	2	1	6	7	13	−6	22.22
Troyes	23 June 2010	3 December 2015	236	94	54	88	320	283	+37	39.83
Brest	30 May 2016	17 May 2019	128	63	35	30	206	140	+66	49.22
Auxerre	17 May 2019	11 October 2022	125	53	38	34	200	163	+37	42.40
Caen	1 July 2023	7 November 2023	13	4	3	6	20	18	+2	30.77
Total			716	283	185	248	1,001	898	+103	39.53

== Honours ==
=== Player ===
Bordeaux

- Coupe Gambardella: 1976

Tours

- Division 2: 1983–84

Montpellier

- Division 2: 1986–87

=== Manager ===
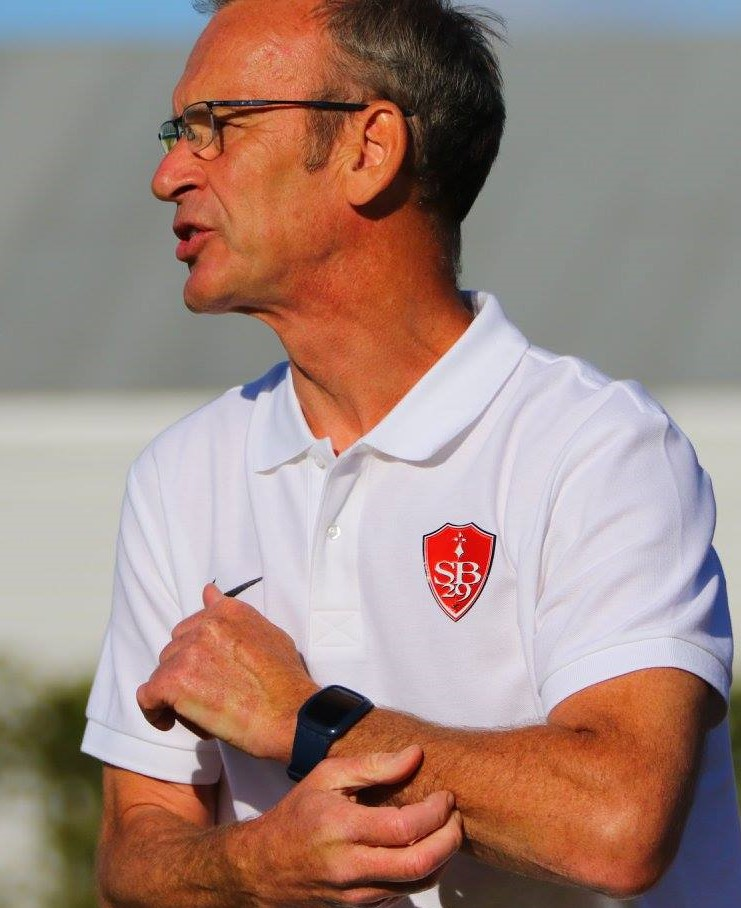
Furlan with Brest in July 2016

Libourne

- Championnat de France Amateur 2: 1998–99
- Championnat de France Amateur promotion: 1999–2000, 2002–03
- Coupe d'Aquitaine: 2003–04

Troyes

- Ligue 2: 2014–15, third place promotion: 2004–05, 2011–12

Brest

- Ligue 2 runner-up: 2018–19

Individual

- Ligue 2 Manager of the Year: 2004–05, 2014–15
