= Frédéric Thomas (footballer) =

French footballer (born 1980)

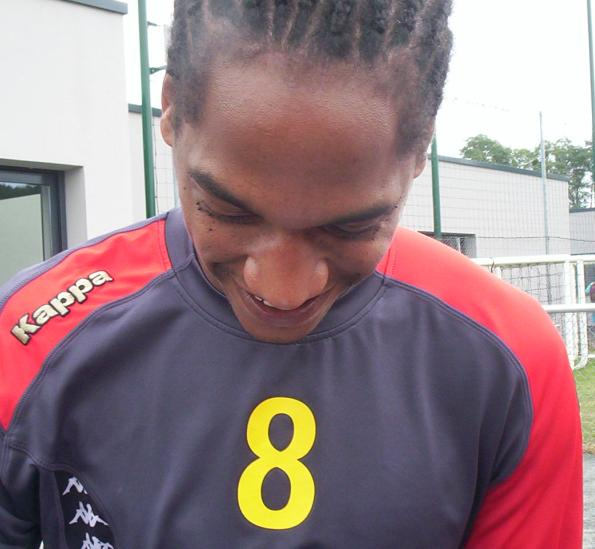

Personal information
- Full name: Frédéric Thomas
- Date of birth: August 10, 1980 (age 46)
- Place of birth: Sarcelles, France
- Height: 1.83 m (6 ft 0 in)
- Position: Midfielder

Team information
- Current team: AS Mulsanne-Teloché

Youth career
- St.-Leu
- St.-Denis
- Puiseaux-sur-Louvres
- Le Mans

Senior career*
Years	Team	Apps	(Gls)
1999–2006	Le Mans	169	(5)
2006–2008	Auxerre	56	(1)
2008–2013	Le Mans	137	(6)
2014–2016	Grenoble	63	(2)
2018–	AS Mulsanne-Téloche	5	(0)
- * Club domestic league appearances and goals

Frédéric Thomas (born August 10, 1980) is a French footballer who plays as a midfielder for AS Mulsanne-Teloché. He began his career with Le Mans FC and returned there after a spell at AJ Auxerre. He finished his career at Grenoble Foot 38.
