= Stéphane Moulin =

French footballer and manager (born 1967)

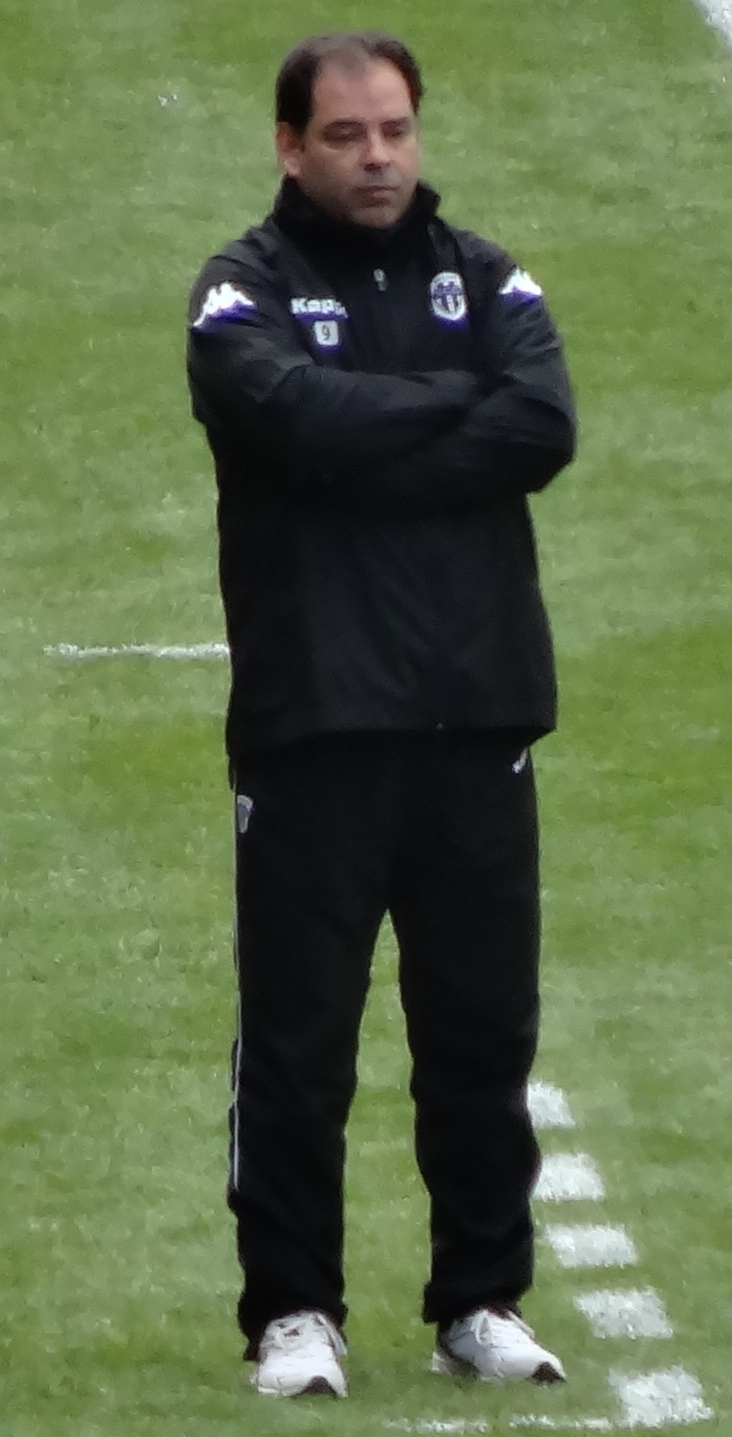
- Moulin as Angers manager in 2014

Personal information
- Date of birth: 4 August 1967 (age 59)
- Place of birth: Paris, France
- Height: 1.70 m (5 ft 7 in)
- Position: Midfielder

Team information
- Current team: Concarneau (manager)

Senior career*
Years	Team	Apps	(Gls)
1984–1990	Angers	127	(5)
1990–1992	Châteauroux	51	(9)
1992–1997	Châtellerault	129	(11)
Total		307	(25)

Managerial career
- 1997–2005: Châtellerault
- 2005–2011: Angers B
- 2011–2021: Angers
- 2021–2023: Caen
- 2025–2026: Valenciennes
- 2026–: Concarneau
- * Club domestic league appearances and goals

Stéphane Moulin (born 4 August 1967) is a French professional football manager and former player who is the head coach of Ligue 3 club Concarneau. As a player, he played as a midfielder.

== Club career ==
Moulin began his playing career with Angers in 1984 and went on to make 127 league appearances in six seasons with the club. Between 1990 and 1992, he played 51 games and scored nine goals for Châteauroux. After leaving Châteauroux, Moulin spent five years with Châtellerault, during which time he scored eleven goals in 129 league appearances.

== Managerial career ==
Following his retirement in 1997, Moulin was appointed as manager of Châtellerault, a position he held for eight seasons. At the start of the 2005–06 season he was hired by his former club, Angers, to manage the reserve team. He initially shared the position with Gilles Kerhuiel, but continued alone after Kerhuiel left in 2006 to continue his playing career. In the summer of 2011, Moulin was promoted to first-team manager following the departure of Jean-Louis Garcia to Lens.

On 26 March 2021, Moulin announced that he would be leaving Angers at the end of the season, putting an end to his ten-year spell as manager of the club. He had been the longest-continuously-serving manager of any club in Europe's top five leagues.

On 4 June 2021, Moulin was announced as the new manager of Caen, signing a contract until 2024. He resigned in 2023, and was succeeded by Jean-Marc Furlan.

== Personal life ==
In September 2021, Moulin publicly denounced an allegation of racism and religious discrimination from investigative reporter Romain Molina. Moulin declared his intention to lodge a legal complaint.

== Managerial statistics ==
As of match played 15 May 2026

Managerial record by team and tenure
Team	From	To	Record							
Team	From	To	G	W	D	L	GF	GA	GD	Win %
Châtellerault	30 June 1997	1 July 2005	285	116	89	80	398	348	+50	40.70
Angers B	1 July 2005	22 June 2011	178	75	43	60	248	213	+35	42.13
Angers	22 June 2011	24 May 2021	416	154	111	151	509	500	+9	37.02
Caen	4 June 2021	2 June 2023	80	30	25	25	110	89	+21	37.50
Valenciennes	1 July 2025	Present	33	10	9	14	36	45	−9	30.30
Total			992	385	277	330	1,301	1,195	+106	38.81

== Honours ==
Châtellerault

- Championnat de France Amateur Group D runners-up: 2004–05

Angers

- Coupe de France runner-up: 2016–17
