= Landry Chauvin =

French football manager (born 1968)

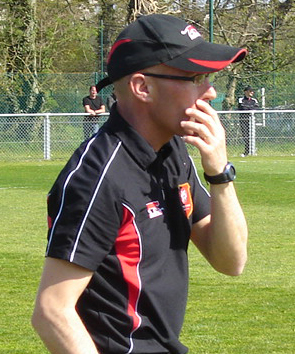
- Chauvin in 2007

Personal information
- Full name: Landry Roger Eugène Chauvin
- Date of birth: 7 December 1968 (age 57)
- Place of birth: Château-Gontier, France
- Position: Midfielder

Senior career*
Years	Team	Apps	(Gls)
1985–1987	Laval B	6	(0)
1989–1992	Vitré		

Managerial career
- 2008–2011: Sedan
- 2011–2012: Nantes
- 2012–2013: Brest
- 2014: Club Africain
- * Club domestic league appearances and goals

Landry Roger Eugène Chauvin (born 7 December 1968) is a French former footballer who most recently was the manager of Tunisian team Club Africain.

== Career ==
Chauvin spent his playing career in the semi-professional leagues. He made six appearances in two seasons with Laval B between 1985 and 1987, and then spent three years with Vitré.

In 1992, he joined the coaching staff at Rennes, where he stayed for 16 seasons. Chauvin was appointed as manager of Sedan on 27 May 2008, and signed a contract extension the following year. On 1 June 2011, after three years with Sedan, Chauvin was hired as the manager of Nantes on a two-year deal. On 31 May 2012, Chauvin was appointed as the head coach of Brest after resigning from Nantes. In January 2014, he became the manager of the Tunisian team Club Africain but lasted just five weeks before being fired.
