= Invicta (company) =

Italian outdoor accessories company

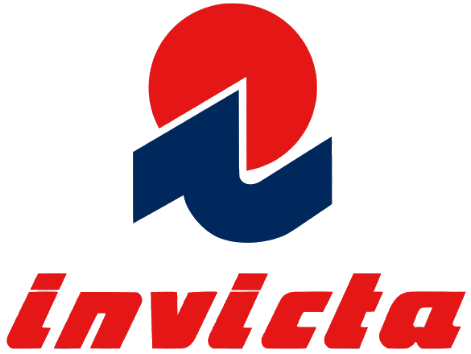
- Company type: Private
- Industry: Textile
- Founded: 1906; 120 years ago
- Headquarters: Turin, Italy
- Products: Backpacks, clothing, footwear
- Website: invicta.it

Invicta is an Italian outdoor accessories company and trademark founded in 1906 in England. The company is mostly known for its multi-colored backpacks. Products commercialised also include clothing (t-shirts, polo shirts, hoodies, jackets), and footwear (sneakers).

== Overview ==
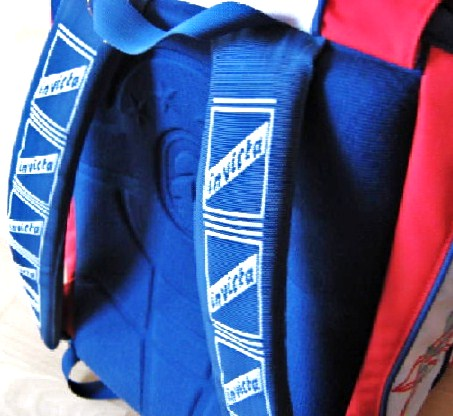
An Invicta bag

It was bought by a Turin enterprise in 1921, and acquired by Diadora in 1998. Diadora sold off the company in 2006 to Seven Spa. In 2001 it was reported that Invicta and Seven Spa backpacks were the best-selling backpacks in Italy. In 1994 it was reported that 85% of Milanese students used Invicta backpacks.
