= Noël Tosi =

French football coach and former player (born 1959)

Personal information
- Date of birth: 25 May 1959 (age 67)
- Place of birth: Philippeville, French Algeria
- Position: Goalkeeper

Team information
- Current team: Thonon Evian (Manager)

Youth career
- 1966–1976: Carpentras

Senior career*
Years	Team	Apps	(Gls)
1976–1980	Avignon		
1980–1981	Gazélec Ajaccio		
1981–1983	Saint-Benoît		
1983–19??	Orange		

Managerial career
- 1986–1988: AS Trouville-Deauville
- 1991: Grenoble
- 1992–1993: Bourges (assistant)
- 1993–1994: Lucé
- 1994–1995: Avignon
- 1995–1996: Nîmes (youth academy)
- 1996–1997: Quimper
- 1997–1998: Montauban
- 1998–1999: Dijon
- 1999–2001: US Lusitanos Saint-Maur
- 2001–2002: Gueugnon
- 2002–2003: Créteil-Lusitanos
- 2003–2004: Mauritania
- 2004: Angers
- 2004: RCF Paris
- 2004–2005: Angers
- 2006–2007: Congo
- 2007–2009: Cherbourg
- 2010–2011: Nîmes
- 2012: JS Saint-Pierroise
- 2013: Arles-Avignon
- 2014: US Le Pontet
- 2014–2016: MDA Chasselay
- 2017: Mulhouse
- 2018–2019: Wydad AC (technical director)
- 2019–2020: AS Cherbourg
- 2020: Jeunesse Esch
- 2020–2021: FC Balagne (general director)
- 2022: Africa Sports
- 2023: Diables Noirs
- 2024: GOAL FC
- 2025–: Thonon Evian
- * Club domestic league appearances and goals

Noël Tosi (born 25 May 1959) is a French football coach and former player. He is currently the manager of Thonon Evian. As a player, he played for minor clubs in France. His first job as a coach was Deauville in 1986. Tosi previously coached the Congo national team. He was sworn in as coach in September 2006 after coaching the Mauritania national team, and French Ligue 2 teams FC Gueugnon and US Créteil-Lusitanos previously. Tosi was charged with improving Congo, and perhaps getting them to the African Cup of Nations.

== Managerial career ==
In 2014 Tosi quit as manager of US Le Pontet. At the time, the club was in fourth place in the CFA. Tosi was manager of MDA Chasselay for one-and-a-half seasons. He escaped relegation from the CFA in the 2014–15 season. In June 2016 it was announced he had agreed the termination of his contract with the club. The club's president cited financial constraints preventing the club from keeping Tosi. After being unable to prevent FC Mulhouse's relegation to Championnat National 3 in the previous season, Tosi left the club in June 2017.
