= Denis Zanko =

French footballer and manager (born 1964)

Personal information
- Date of birth: 1964 (age 61–62)
- Place of birth: Vannes, France
- Height: 1.72 m (5 ft 8 in)
- Position: Midfielder

Youth career
- 1980–1984: Laval

Senior career*
Years	Team	Apps	(Gls)
1984–1985	Laval	27	(2)
1985–1986	Racing Paris	26	(0)
1986–1988	Tours	58	(0)
1988–1991	Dunkerque	87	(1)
1991–1995	Valence	108	(2)
Total		306	(5)

Managerial career
- 1994–1999: Valence (youth)
- 1999–2000: Valence
- 2000–2001: UMS Montélimar (assistant)
- 2001–2008: Laval (assistant)
- 2009–2011: Le Mans B
- 2011–2013: Le Mans
- 2013–2014: Laval (assistant)
- 2014–2016: Laval
- 2017–2020: Toulouse B
- 2020: Toulouse
- * Club domestic league appearances and goals

Denis Zanko (born 1964) is a French professional football manager and former player who played as a midfielder. He made over 250 league appearances for five different clubs during his playing career before becoming a coach in 1995. He went on to manage Valence and Le Mans's reserve side, and was appointed first-team manager at Le Mans in December 2011.

== Playing career ==
Born in Vannes, Zanko started his playing career with Laval, and made his debut for the reserve team in the 1980–81 season. He played his first senior match for the club four years later and went on to score two goals in 27 Division 1 matches during the 1984–85 campaign. In the summer of 1985, Zanko joined Division 2 side Racing Paris, where he made 26 first-team appearances. At Racing he was a part of the team that won the Division 2 Group B in 1986. In the summer of that year he switched clubs again, signing for Tours. Zanko spent two seasons with the club, during which he played 58 league matches.

In 1988, Zanko transferred to Division 2 Group A side Dunkerque. He made a total of 37 league and cup appearances during his first season at the club, and scored his first goal for Dunkerque in the 3–1 away win over Le Mans on 22 April 1989. Zanko spent two more years with the team, playing in a further 53 league matches. He moved to Division 3 outfit Valence in the summer of 1991, and scored once in 30 appearances as the side won promotion to Division 2 at the end of the 1991–92 season. The following season, he played 28 matches, again scoring once, as the team finished fifth in their group to secure their place in the new nationwide Ligue 2. Zanko played two more seasons with Valence, making a total of 50 league appearances.

== Coaching career ==
Following his retirement from playing in 1995, Zanko joined the coaching staff at Valence. He spent four years as a coach before being appointed as manager in 1999 following the departure of Bruno Metsu. However, the team finished second-bottom of the division after winning only six of their 38 matches, and was subsequently relegated to the Championnat National. Zanko left Valence at the end of the 1999–2000 season. He then spent a year out of football before becoming a coach at Laval, where he had started his playing career, in 2001. Zanko went on to spend seven seasons on the staff at Laval, before being hired as a youth-team coach by Le Mans in June 2008.

Zanko became manager of Le Mans B, who play in the Championnat de France amateur, in 2009. He led the team to successive mid-table finishes in 2009–10 and 2010–11. In December 2011, following the departure of Arnaud Cormier, Zanko was appointed as the first team manager at Le Mans.

On 28 June 2017, Zanko was presented as the new manager of the reserve team of Toulouse FC. In January 2020, he took over the first team who were last-placed in Ligue 1, having lost ten consecutive games under Antoine Kombouaré. Relegated, he returned to his post as head of the club's academy in June.
