= Yohan Demont =

French footballer (born 1978)

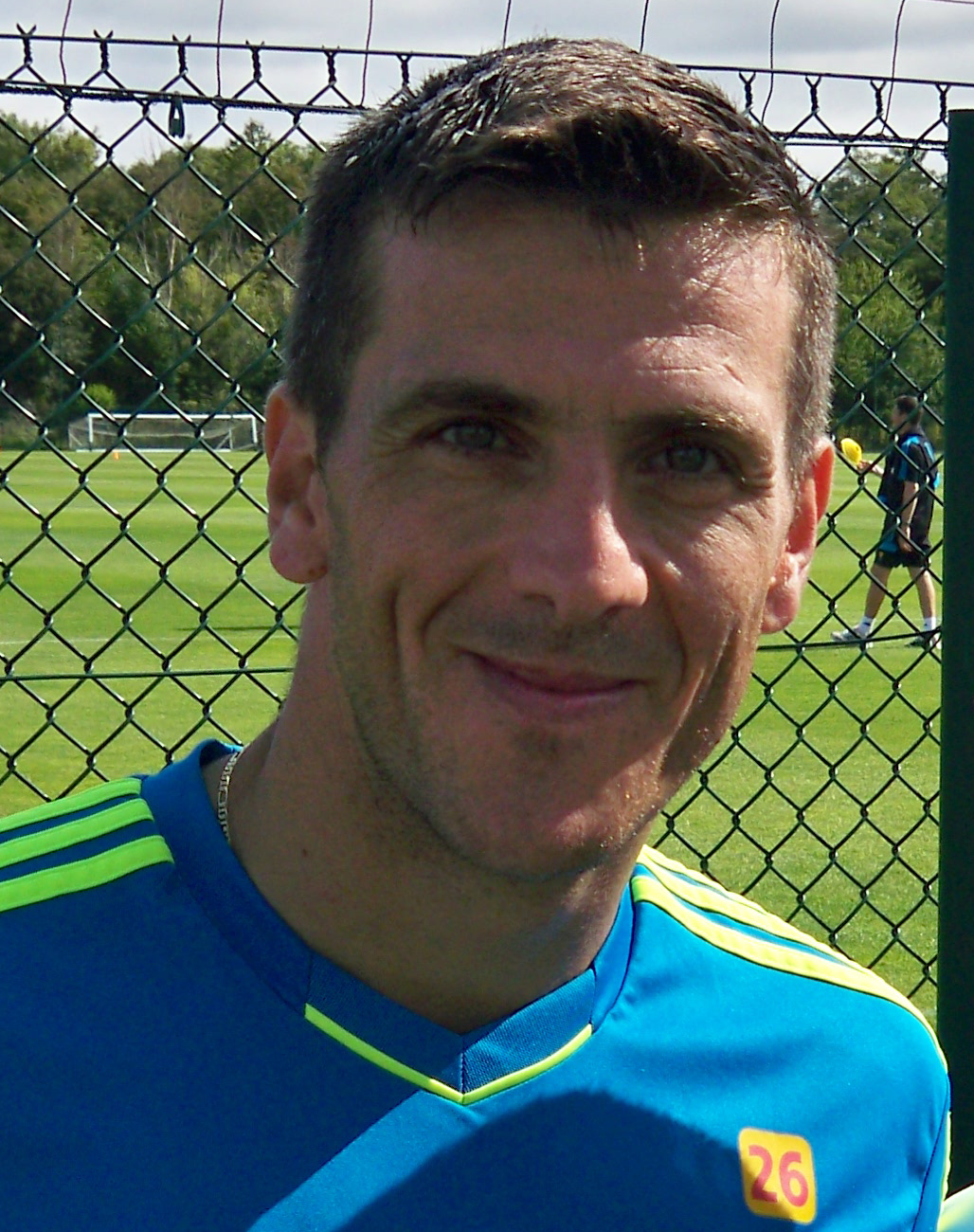
- Demont at Lens training in 2011

Personal information
- Date of birth: 15 May 1978 (age 48)
- Place of birth: Valenciennes, France
- Height: 1.81 m (5 ft 11 in)
- Positions: Right-back; right midfielder

Senior career*
Years	Team	Apps	(Gls)
1999–2002	AS Beauvais	98	(6)
2002–2005	Ajaccio	71	(6)
2005–2013	Lens	246	(11)
2013–2014	Lens B	7	(0)
Total		422	(23)

Managerial career
- 2020–2022: Lens B
- * Club domestic league appearances and goals

Yohan Demont (born 15 May 1978) is a French former professional footballer who played as right-back or right midfielder. Following spells at AS Beauvais and AC Ajaccio, he spent most of his career at RC Lens.

== Career ==
Out of a contract at the end of 2012–13 season, Demont agreed to stay at RC Lens to play for the reserves.

== Honours ==
Beauvais

- Championnat National: 2000

Lens

- UEFA Intertoto Cup: 2005
