= Jean-François Rivière =

French footballer (born 1977)

Personal information
- Full name: Jean-François Rivière
- Date of birth: 28 February 1977 (age 49)
- Place of birth: Mayenne, France
- Height: 5 ft 11 in (1.80 m)
- Position: Striker

Senior career*
| Years | Team | Apps | (Gls) |
| 1995–2000 | Laval | 62 | (13) |
| 2000–2003 | Amiens | 66 | (23) |
| 2003–2004 | Besançon | 30 | (7) |
| 2004–2008 | Chamois Niortais | 111 | (27) |
| 2008–2009 | Angers | 28 | (3) |
| 2009–2011 | Ajaccio | 59 | (17) |
| 2011–2013 | Clermont | 30 | (12) |
| 2013 | Gazélec Ajaccio | 9 | (0) |
| Total | | 395 | (102) |
- * Club domestic league appearances and goals

Jean-François Rivière (born 28 February 1977) is a retired French footballer who played as a striker. His previous clubs include Chamois Niortais, Stade Lavallois, Amiens SC, Besançon RC, AC Ajaccio, Clermont Foot, and Gazélec Ajaccio.

== Career ==
In January 2013, Rivière joined Gazélec Ajaccio.
