= José Pasqualetti =

French footballer (born 1956)

Personal information
- Date of birth: 27 September 1956 (age 70)
- Place of birth: Bastia, France
- Height: 1.71 m (5 ft 7 in)
- Position: Midfielder

Youth career
- 1968–1974: Bastia

Senior career*
Years	Team	Apps	(Gls)
1974–1977	Bastia		
1977–1979	Alès		
1979–1982	Montpellier	94	(14)
1982–1984	Lyon		
1984–1986	Béziers		
1986–1990	Alès		

Managerial career
- 1991–1992: Alès Youth academy
- 1992–1996: Alès
- 1998–1999: Bastia assistant coach
- 1999: Bastia
- 1999–2002: Bastia 2nd team and youth academy
- 2002–2004: Bastia assistant coach
- 2004–2005: Ajaccio assistant coach
- 2006: Ajaccio
- 2006: Sedan assistant coach
- 2006–2008: Sedan
- 2008–2009: Ajaccio
- 2010–2014: Istres
- 2014–2015: Nîmes
- * Club domestic league appearances and goals

José Pasqualetti (born 27 September 1956), is a French former professional footballer who played as a midfielder and current manager. He formerly managed AC Ajaccio.

He was named FC Istres manager in April 2010.
