= Jean-Louis Garcia =

French football manager (born 1962)

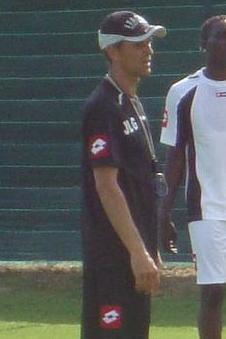
- Garcia (left) during a training session as Angers manager in 2009

Personal information
- Date of birth: 20 September 1962 (age 64)
- Place of birth: Ollioules, France
- Position: Goalkeeper

Senior career*
Years	Team	Apps	(Gls)
1980–1983	Cannes	8	(0)
1983–1984	Montceau	6	(0)
1984–1985	Cannes	10	(0)
1985–1986	Monaco	0	(0)
1987–1988	Châtellerault	34	(0)
1988–1991	Nancy	0	(0)
1991–1995	Nantes	3	(0)
Total		61	(0)

Managerial career
- 1995–1998: Nantes (goalkeeper coach)
- 1999–2003: Bordeaux (reserves)
- 2003–2006: Toulon
- 2006–2011: Angers
- 2011–2012: Lens
- 2013–2014: Châteauroux
- 2015–2016: Grenoble
- 2016–2018: Troyes
- 2019–2021: Nancy
- 2021–2022: Seraing
- 2024: Quevilly-Rouen
- * Club domestic league appearances and goals

Jean-Louis Garcia (born 20 September 1962) is a French football manager and former player.

== Club career ==
Garcia was a goalkeeper for many clubs including Cannes, Monaco, Châtellerault, Nancy and Nantes. As a player, he had quite a successful career apart from one game in Europe in 1995 against Bayer Leverkusen. Nantes had no other goalkeepers – David Marraud, Éric Loussouarn and Dominique Casagrande were injured. Therefore, Garcia, who had not played for two years, played in goal, conceding five goals during the match.

== Coaching career ==
As a coach, he was firstly assistant goalkeeper coach to Nantes between 1995 and 1998, then took charge of the reserves at Bordeaux from 1999 to 2003. He finally became a proper manager at Toulon, staying there from 2003 until 2006. He joined Angers in June 2006, replacing Stéphane Paille.

On 28 May 2019, he was appointed manager of Nancy. On 20 May 2021, he was replaced as manager by Daniel Stendel.

== Managerial statistics ==
As of match played 17 May 2024

Managerial record by team and tenure
Team	Nat	From	To	Record							
Team	Nat	From	To	G	W	D	L	GF	GA	GD	Win %
Toulon	(France)	1 July 2003	9 June 2006	115	57	36	22	132	79	+53	49.57
Angers	(France)	9 June 2006	1 June 2011	215	91	67	57	271	200	+71	42.33
Lens	(France)	1 June 2011	24 September 2012	52	16	17	19	56	68	−12	30.77
Châteauroux	(France)	28 October 2013	29 May 2014	27	8	7	12	31	39	−8	29.63
Grenoble	(France)	16 June 2015	5 June 2016	35	21	8	6	56	23	+33	60.00
Troyes	(France)	5 June 2016	22 May 2018	86	32	17	37	102	112	−10	37.21
Nancy	(France)	28 May 2019	20 May 2021	74	22	30	22	91	88	+3	29.73
Seraing	(Belgium)	3 January 2022	4 May 2022	15	3	4	8	8	26	−18	20.00
Quevilly-Rouen	(France)	24 January 2024	30 June 2024	18	4	9	5	26	25	+1	22.22
Total				637	254	195	188	773	660	+113	39.87
