= 2010–11 Ligue 1 =

73rd season of top-tier French football

Ligue 1
- Season: 2010–11
- Dates: 7 August 2010 – 29 May 2011
- Champions: Lille; 3rd Ligue 1 title 5th French title
- Relegated: Monaco; Lens; Arles-Avignon
- Champions League: Lille; Marseille; Lyon
- Europa League: Paris Saint-Germain; Sochaux; Rennes
- Matches: 380
- Goals: 888 (2.34 per match)
- Top goalscorer: Moussa Sow (25 goals)
- Biggest home win: Lyon 5–0 Arles-Avignon (6 March 2011); Lille 5–0 Arles-Avignon (30 April 2011)
- Biggest away win: Arles-Avignon 0–4 Auxerre (2 October 2010); Nancy 0–4 AS Monaco (7 November 2010); Nice 0–4 Caen (1 May 2011); Bordeaux 0–4 Sochaux (7 May 2011)
- Highest scoring: Lille 6–3 Lorient (5 December 2010)
- Longest winning run: 5 games Rennes (5 February - 5 March)
- Longest unbeaten run: 13 games Lyon (2 October - 15 January); Lille (31 October - 13 February)
- Longest losing run: 8 games Arles-Avignon (7 August - 2 October)
- Highest attendance: 55,790; Marseille 1–2 Caen
- Lowest attendance: 4,921; AS Monaco 3–1 Lorient
- Average attendance: 19,650

The 2010–11 Ligue 1 season was the 73rd since its establishment. Entering the season, Marseille were the defending champions. The fixtures were announced on 21 May 2010 and the season began on 7 August and ended on 29 May 2011. The winter break was in effect between 23 December and 15 January 2011. There were three promoted teams from Ligue 2, replacing the three teams that were relegated from Ligue 1 following the 2009–10 season. A total of 20 teams currently competes in the league with three clubs suffering relegation to the second division, Ligue 2. All clubs that secured Ligue 1 status for the season were subject to approval by the DNCG before becoming eligible to participate. In addition, German sportswear company Puma, whom the Ligue de Football Professionnel share a partnership with, provided a brand new match ball for the new season.

Lille clinched the league title on 21 May 2011 with one match to spare after drawing 2–2 with Paris Saint-Germain away at the Parc des Princes. The title was the club's third overall and its first in over 57 years. As a result of Lille also winning the Coupe de France during the season, the club became the third different club in three consecutive seasons to win some form of the double in France. In 2009, Bordeaux captured the league and league cup double and, in the following season, Marseille did the same.

== Teams ==
Location of teams in Ligue 1 2010–11

On 19 April, Caen drew 0–0 with Nîmes. The draw assured Caen a return to Ligue 1 after falling down to Ligue 2 the previous season. On 30 April, Brest secured promotion to Ligue 1, for the first time since being administratively relegated in 1991, following stalemates in matches involving Metz and Clermont. Brest capped the promotion by defeating Tours 2–0 on the same day. On 14 May, on the final day of the Ligue 2 season, Arles-Avignon became the last Ligue 2 club to achieve promotion to the first division. The club defeated fourth-place club Clermont 1–0 at home to earn promotion. The club had achieved promotion to Ligue 2 from the third-tier Championnat National the previous season meaning the club has jumped two divisions in just two seasons.

Grenoble was the first club to suffer relegation to Ligue 2. The club's impending drop occurred on 10 April 2010 following the team's 4–0 defeat to Toulouse. On 3 May 2010, both Boulogne and Le Mans were relegated to Ligue 2 following defeats. Le Mans relegation was confirmed following their 3–2 loss away to Nancy, while Boulogne suffered relegation after losing 1–0 to Saint-Étienne, who both Boulogne and Le Mans were trailing. Having earned promotion to Ligue 1 the previous season, Boulogne's return to Ligue 2 meant a short-lived stay in the highest division.

=== Stadia and locations ===
On 17 May 2010, the Ligue de Football Professionnel announced that, for the first time in French football history, two clubs, Lorient and Nancy, would switch the surface of their football pitch from grass to artificial turf. This type of surface is common in North America and Eastern Europe, but is considered rare in Western Europe. Both clubs attributed the switch to weather and ecological problems with severe cold fronts affecting their regions every winter. The switch would, in turn, reduce energy costs and also avoid cancellations of matches due to a frozen pitch. Also, in Lorient's case, a constant proliferation of earthworms onto their pitch over the past two seasons had led to a rapid deterioration of the ground, which has forced the club to spend as much as €2 million to replace it. Both clubs previously toured Russia, Austria, and Norway to become better acclimated with the surface.

Club	Location	Venue	Capacity	Average attendance^{1}
Arles-Avignon	Avignon	Parc des Sports	17,518	9,314
Auxerre	Auxerre	Stade de l'Abbé-Deschamps	24,493	11,113
Bordeaux	Bordeaux	Stade Chaban-Delmas	34,462	25,221
Brest	Brest	Stade Francis-Le Blé	16,000	13,379
Caen	Caen	Stade Michel d'Ornano	21,500	15,487
Lens	Lens	Stade Félix-Bollaert	41,233	31,820
Lille	Villeneuve d'Ascq	Stadium Nord Lille Métropole	18,185	16,237
Lorient	Lorient	Stade du Moustoir	18,890	15,540
Lyon	Lyon	Stade de Gerland	41,842	34,914
Marseille	Marseille	Stade Vélodrome	60,013	51,210
Monaco	Fontvieille	Stade Louis II	18,500	6,517
Montpellier	Montpellier	Stade de la Mosson	32,900	16,706
Nancy	Tomblaine	Stade Marcel Picot	20,085	16,696
Nice	Nice	Stade du Ray	17,415	8,428
Paris Saint-Germain	Paris	Parc des Princes	48,712	28,736
Rennes	Rennes	Stade de la Route de Lorient	31,127	23,641
Saint-Étienne	Saint-Étienne	Stade Geoffroy-Guichard	35,616	25,503
Sochaux	Montbéliard	Stade Auguste Bonal	20,005	11,976
Toulouse	Toulouse	Stadium Municipal	35,470	19,961
Valenciennes	Valenciennes	Stade Nungesser	16,547	11,432

^{1}Source: As of 26 April 2011

=== Personnel and kits ===
Team	Manager	Captain	Kit Manufacturer	Shirt sponsors (front)	Shirt sponsors (back)	Shirt sponsors (sleeve)	Shorts sponsors
Arles-Avignon	(Bosnia and Herzegovina) Faruk Hadžibegić	(France) Sébastien Piocelle	Uhlsport	CESP Energie Solaire	CESP Energie Solaire	Marie Blachère	Marie Blachère
Auxerre	(France) Jean Fernandez	(France) Benoît Pedretti	Airness	Senoble, Invicta Group	Groupama	Conseil général de l'Yonne	Besson Chaussures
Bordeaux	(France) Jean Tigana	(France) Alou Diarra	Puma	Kia	Cdiscount	Pichet Immobilier	Cdiscount
Brest	(France) Alex Dupont	(Republic of the Congo) Oscar Ewolo	Nike	Quéguiner Matériaux (H)/Yaourt Malo (A & 3)/La Potagère (A & 3), Geodis Calberson, Breizh Cola	Casino Supermarchés	GUYOT Environnement	IDP
Caen	(France) Franck Dumas	(France) Nicolas Seube	Nike	GDE Recyclage (H)/Campagne de France (A & 3), GDE Recyclage (A & 3)	Petit Forestier	None	None
Lens	(Romania) László Bölöni	(Morocco) Adil Hermach	Reebok	Invicta Group, Allianz, Optex	France-pari	Nord-Pas-de-Calais	McCain Foods
Lille	(France) Rudi Garcia	(France) Rio Mavuba	Umbro	Partouche	Partouche	Nord-Pas-de-Calais	None
Lorient	(France) Christian Gourcuff	(France) Fabien Audard	Duarig	La Trinitaine, Armor-Lux, B&B Hotels	Salaun Holidays	None	Cap l'Orient Agglomération
Lyon	(France) Claude Puel	(Brazil) Cris	Adidas	Betclic (H)/Everest Poker (A), MDA Electroménager (H)/LG (A)	Groupama	Araldite	Renault Trucks
Marseille	(France) Didier Deschamps	(France) Steve Mandanda	Adidas	Betclic	Intersport	None	Groupama
Monaco	(France) Laurent Banide	(France) Stéphane Ruffier	Macron	Fedcom, HSBC	HSBC	HSBC	Peace and Sport
Montpellier	(France) René Girard	(Serbia) Nenad Džodić	Nike	La Foir'Fouille/NetBet, Dyneff, La Région Languedoc-Roussillon	Montpellier Agglomération	Renault Trucks	Système U
Nancy	(Uruguay) Pablo Correa	(France) Gennaro Bracigliano	Umbro	Delipapier/Cora Supermarché/Umbro/Sopalin/Nouvelec Connexion Laxou/Ticket Sport/Centre Commercial Saint Sébastien/Kompass/Steve/Rozana/Factum/Pixab/The Fanclub, Geodis Calberson, Sopalin, Grand Nancy	Triangle Intérim	Fort Aventure	Caisse d'Epargne
Nice	(France) Eric Roy	(France) Julien Sablé	Lotto	Mad-Croc Energy Drink, Takara Multimédia, Métropole Nice Côte d'Azur	Pizzorno Environnement	None	Métropole Nice Côte d'Azur
Paris Saint-Germain	(France) Antoine Kombouaré	(France) Claude Makélélé	Nike	Fly Emirates, UNICEF	Winamax Poker	Poweo	Elior Group
Rennes	(France) Frédéric Antonetti	(Senegal) Kader Mangane	Puma	Samsic, rennes.fr	Blot Immobilier	Association ELA	Breizh Cola
Saint-Étienne	(France) Christophe Galtier	(France) Loïc Perrin	Adidas	Winamax Poker, Invicta Group, Conseil général de la Loire en Rhône-Alpes	Funai	Kaspersky	Saint-Étienne Métropole, Loire
Sochaux	(France) Francis Gillot	(France) Jérémie Bréchet	Lotto	Peugeot, Mobil 1, Franche-Comté	Pays de Montbéliard Agglomération	Peugeot Occasions Du Lion	None
Toulouse	(France) Alain Casanova	(Argentina) Mauro Cetto	Airness	Groupe IDEC, Fondation TFC, JD Promotion	Newrest	None	None
Valenciennes	(France) Philippe Montanier	(France) Rudy Mater	Nike	Toyota (H)/SITA (A), Partouche	SITA (H)/Toyota (A)	Nord-Pas-de-Calais	None

=== Managerial changes ===
Team	Outgoing head coach	Manner of departure	Date of vacancy	Position in table	Incoming head coach	Date of appointment	Position in table
Bordeaux	(France) Laurent Blanc	Mutual consent	16 May 2010	Off-season	(France) Jean Tigana	25 May 2010	Off-season
Arles-Avignon	(France) Michel Estevan	Sacked	16 September 2010	20th	(Bosnia and Herzegovina) Faruk Hadžibegić	2 October 2010	20th
Lens	(France) Jean-Guy Wallemme	Resigned	2 January 2011	19th	(Romania) László Bölöni	2 January 2011	19th
Monaco	(France) Guy Lacombe	Sacked	10 January 2011	17th	(France) Laurent Banide	10 January 2011	17th
Bordeaux	(France) Jean Tigana	Resigned	7 May 2011	9th	(France) Eric Bédouet	7 May 2011	9th

== League table ==
Pos	Team	Pld	W	D	L	GF	GA	GD	Pts	Qualification or relegation
1	Lille (C)	38	21	13	4	68	36	+32	76	Qualification to Champions League group stage
2	Marseille	38	18	14	6	62	39	+23	68	Qualification to Champions League group stage
3	Lyon	38	17	13	8	61	40	+21	64	Qualification to Champions League play-off round
4	Paris Saint-Germain	38	15	15	8	56	41	+15	60	Qualification to Europa League play-off round (Note: As 2010–11 Coupe de France winners Lille qualified for the UEFA Champions League and cup runners-up Paris St. Germain were already ensured of a UEFA Europa League spot via league placement, the play-off round berth reserved for the cup winners was awarded to Sochaux, the fifth-placed team.)
5	Sochaux	38	17	7	14	60	43	+17	58	Qualification to Europa League play-off round
6	Rennes	38	15	11	12	38	35	+3	56	Qualification to Europa League third qualifying round (Note: As Coupe de la Ligue winners Marseille qualified for the UEFA Champions League, the UEFA Europa League third qualification round berth reserved for the League Cup winners was awarded to Rennes, the sixth-placed team.)
7	Bordeaux	38	12	15	11	43	42	+1	51	
8	Toulouse	38	14	8	16	38	36	+2	50	
9	Auxerre	38	10	19	9	45	41	+4	49	
10	Saint-Étienne	38	12	13	13	46	47	−1	49	
11	Lorient	38	12	13	13	46	48	−2	49	
12	Valenciennes	38	10	18	10	45	41	+4	48	
13	Nancy	38	13	9	16	43	48	−5	48	
14	Montpellier	38	12	11	15	32	43	−11	47	
15	Caen	38	11	13	14	46	51	−5	46	
16	Brest	38	11	13	14	36	43	−7	46	
17	Nice	38	11	13	14	33	48	−15	46	
18	Monaco (R)	38	9	17	12	36	40	−4	44	Relegation to Ligue 2
19	Lens (R)	38	7	14	17	35	58	−23	35	Relegation to Ligue 2
20	Arles-Avignon (R)	38	3	11	24	21	70	−49	20	Relegation to Ligue 2

Source: Ligue 1
Rules for classification: 1) points; 2) goal difference; 3) number of goals scored.
(C) Champions; (R) Relegated

== Results ==
Home \ Away	ACAA	AUX	BOR	BRS	CAE	RCL	LIL	LOR	OL	OM	ASM	MHS	NAL	NIC	PSG	REN	STE	SOC	TFC	VAL
Arles-Avignon		0–4	2–4	1–1	3–2	0–1	0–1	3–3	1–1	0–3	0–2	0–0	1–1	0–0	1–2	0–1	0–1	1–3	1–0	0–1
Auxerre	1–1		0–1	0–1	1–1	1–1	1–1	2–2	4–0	1–1	1–1	1–0	2–2	2–0	1–0	2–1	2–2	2–0	1–2	1–1
Bordeaux	0–0	3–0		0–2	1–2	2–2	1–1	1–0	2–0	1–1	0–1	2–0	2–1	2–0	1–0	0–0	2–0	0–4	1–2	1–1
Brest	0–0	1–1	1–3		1–3	4–1	1–2	0–0	1–1	0–0	2–0	0–0	2–1	0–0	2–2	2–0	2–0	1–1	0–2	1–0
Caen	2–0	2–0	0–0	0–2		1–1	2–5	0–2	3–2	2–2	0–0	2–0	2–3	0–0	1–2	1–0	1–0	0–3	1–1	2–2
Lens	0–1	1–1	1–0	1–1	2–0		1–4	2–3	1–3	0–1	2–2	2–0	1–2	1–0	0–2	0–0	2–1	2–3	0–1	1–1
Lille	5–0	1–0	1–1	3–1	3–1	1–0		6–3	1–1	1–3	2–1	3–1	3–0	1–1	0–0	3–2	1–1	1–0	2–0	2–1
Lorient	2–0	1–2	5–1	2–0	0–1	3–0	1–1		2–0	2–2	2–1	0–0	0–0	1–2	1–1	2–0	0–0	1–1	0–0	2–1
Lyon	5–0	1–1	0–0	1–0	0–0	3–0	3–1	3–0		3–2	0–0	3–2	4–0	1–0	2–2	1–1	0–1	2–1	2–0	1–1
Marseille	1–0	1–1	2–1	3–0	1–2	1–1	1–2	2–0	1–1		2–2	4–0	1–0	4–2	2–1	0–0	2–1	2–1	2–2	2–2
Monaco	0–0	2–0	2–2	0–1	2–2	1–1	1–0	3–1	0–2	0–0		0–0	0–1	1–1	1–1	1–0	0–2	2–1	0–0	0–2
Montpellier	3–1	1–1	1–0	0–0	0–0	1–4	1–0	3–1	1–2	1–2	0–1		1–2	1–1	1–1	0–1	1–2	2–0	1–0	2–1
Nancy	0–0	3–1	0–0	0–2	2–0	4–0	0–1	1–0	2–3	1–2	0–4	1–2		3–0	2–0	0–3	1–1	1–0	0–2	2–0
Nice	3–2	1–0	2–1	1–1	0–4	0–0	0–2	2–0	2–2	1–0	3–2	0–1	1–1		0–3	1–2	2–1	1–0	2–0	0–0
Paris SG	4–0	2–3	1–2	3–1	2–1	0–0	2–2	0–0	1–0	2–1	2–2	2–2	2–2	0–0		0–0	3–1	2–1	2–1	3–1
Rennes	4–0	0–0	0–0	2–1	1–1	2–0	1–1	1–2	1–1	0–2	1–0	0–1	0–2	2–0	1–0		0–0	2–1	3–1	1–0
Saint-Étienne	2–0	1–1	2–2	2–0	1–1	3–1	1–2	1–2	1–4	1–1	1–1	3–0	2–1	0–2	1–1	1–2		3–2	2–1	1–1
Sochaux	2–1	1–1	1–1	2–1	3–2	3–0	0–0	2–0	0–2	1–2	3–0	0–0	1–0	4–0	3–1	5–1	2–1		1–3	2–1
Toulouse	2–1	0–1	2–0	2–0	1–0	1–1	1–1	3–0	2–0	0–1	2–0	0–1	1–0	1–1	0–2	1–2	0–1	0–1		0–0
Valenciennes	3–0	1–1	2–2	3–0	2–1	1–1	1–1	0–0	2–1	3–2	0–0	0–1	1–1	2–1	1–2	2–0	1–1	1–1	2–1	

Source: Ligue 1
Legend: Blue = home team win; Yellow = draw; Red = away team win.

== Season statistics ==
=== Top scorers ===
Rank	Player	Club	Goals
1	(Senegal) Moussa Sow	Lille	25
2	(France) Kevin Gameiro	Lorient	22
3	(France) Grégory Pujol	Valenciennes	17
3	(Morocco) Youssef El-Arabi	Caen	17
3	(Argentina) Lisandro López	Lyon	17
6	(France) Loïc Rémy	Marseille	16
7	(Ivory Coast) Gervinho	Lille	15
7	(Nigeria) Brown Ideye	Sochaux	15
7	(Mali) Modibo Maïga	Sochaux	15
10	(Brazil) Nenê	Paris Saint-Germain	14

Last updated: 29 May 2011
Source: Official Goalscorers' Standings

=== Scoring ===
- First goal of the season: Mevlüt Erdinç for Paris Saint-Germain against Saint-Étienne (7 August 2010)
- Quickest goal of the season: 58 seconds – Nenê for Paris Saint-Germain against Auxerre (24 October 2010)
- Latest goal in a match in the season: 90+6 minutes – Anthony Modeste for Bordeaux against Nice (12 September 2010)
- Widest winning margin: 5 goals
  - Lyon 5–0 Arles-Avignon (6 March 2011)
  - Lille 5–0 Arles-Avignon (1 May 2011)
- Highest scoring game: 9 goals
  - Lille 6–3 Lorient (5 December 2010)
- Most goals scored in a match by a single team: 6 goals – Lille 6–3 Lorient (5 December 2010)

=== Discipline ===
- Worst overall disciplinary record (1 pt per yellow card, 3 pts per second yellow card/red card):
  - Montpellier – 98 points (77 yellow & 7 red cards)
- Best overall disciplinary record:
  - Brest – 48 points (48 yellow & 0 red cards)
- Most yellow cards (club):
  - Caen – 80
- Most yellow cards (player): 13
  - Renato Civelli (Nice)
  - Alaixys Romao (Lorient)
  - Dennis Oliech (Auxerre)
- Most red cards (club): 8
  - Arles-Avignon
  - Lyon
- Most red cards (player): 2
  - Aly Cissokho (Lyon)
  - Renato Civelli (Nice)
  - Drissa Diakité (Nice)
  - Sambou Yatabaré (Caen)

== Awards ==
=== Monthly awards ===
==== UNFP Player of the Month ====
Month	Player	Club
September	Dimitri Payet	Saint-Étienne
October	Steeve Elana	Brest
November	Clément Chantôme	Paris Saint-Germain
December	Nenê	Paris Saint-Germain
January	Marvin Martin	Sochaux
February	Mickaël Landreau	Lille
March	Eden Hazard	Lille
April	Mamadou Sakho	Paris Saint-Germain

=== Annual awards ===
The nominees for the Player of the Year, Goalkeeper of the Year, Young Player of the Year, Manager of the Year, and Goal of the Year in Ligue 1. The winners were determined at the annual UNFP Awards, which were held on 22 May. The winners will be displayed in bold.

==== Player of the Year ====
Player	Nationality	Club
Kevin Gameiro	France	Lorient
**Eden Hazard**	Belgium	Lille
Nenê	Brazil	Paris Saint-Germain
Moussa Sow	Senegal	Lille

==== Young Player of the Year ====
Player	Nationality	Club
André Ayew	Ghana	Marseille
Marvin Martin	France	Sochaux
Yann M'Vila	France	Rennes
**Mamadou Sakho**	France	Paris Saint-Germain

==== Goalkeeper of the Year ====
Player	Nationality	Club
Mickaël Landreau	France	Lille
Hugo Lloris	France	Lyon
**Steve Mandanda**	France	Marseille
Stéphane Ruffier	France	AS Monaco

==== Manager of the Year ====
Manager	Nationality	Club
Didier Deschamps	France	Marseille
**Rudi Garcia**	France	Lille
Francis Gillot	France	Sochaux
Christian Gourcuff	France	Lorient

==== Team of the Year ====

Ligue 1 Team of the Year

Team of the Year
**Goalkeeper**	(France) Steve Mandanda (Marseille)			
**Defenders**	(France) Anthony Réveillère (Lyon)	(France) Adil Rami (Lille)	(France) Mamadou Sakho (Paris Saint-Germain)	(Nigeria) Taye Taiwo (Marseille)
**Midfielders**	(France) Yann M'Vila (Rennes)	(Ivory Coast) Gervinho (Lille)	(Belgium) Eden Hazard (Lille)	(Brazil) Nenê (Paris Saint-Germain)
**Forwards**	(France) Kévin Gameiro (Lorient)	(Senegal) Moussa Sow (Lille)		
