= 2009–10 Ligue 1 =

72nd season of top-tier French football

Ligue 1
- Season: 2009–10
- Dates: 8 August 2009 – 15 May 2010
- Champions: Marseille; 9th Ligue 1 title 10th French title
- Relegated: Le Mans; Boulogne; Grenoble
- Champions League: Marseille; Lyon; Auxerre
- Europa League: Lille; Paris Saint-Germain; Montpellier
- Matches: 380
- Goals: 916 (2.41 per match)
- Top goalscorer: Mamadou Niang (18 goals)
- Biggest home win: Lorient 5–0 Boulogne (7 November 2009); Grenoble 5–0 Auxerre (6 February 2010)
- Biggest away win: Grenoble 0–4 Rennes (19 September 2009); Monaco 0–4 Lille (13 December 2009); Nancy 0–4 Lille (23 December 2009); Sochaux 0–4 Lyon (21 February 2010)
- Highest scoring: Lyon 5–5 Marseille (8 November 2009)
- Longest winning run: 7 games Auxerre (26 September – 21 November); Lille (28 November – 16 January); Marseille (21 March – 25 April)
- Longest unbeaten run: 15 games Marseille (7 February – 5 May)
- Longest losing run: 11 games Grenoble (8 August – 31 October)
- Highest attendance: 55,920; Marseille 0–0 Bordeaux (30 August 2009)
- Average attendance: 20,089

The 2009–10 Ligue 1 season was the 72nd since its establishment. Bordeaux were the defending champions. The fixtures were announced on 5 June 2009, and play commenced on 8 August and ended on 15 May 2010. There were three promoted teams from Ligue 2, replacing the three teams that were relegated from Ligue 1 following the 2008–09 season. A total of 20 teams competed in the league with three clubs suffering relegation to the second division, Ligue 2. All clubs that secured Ligue 1 status for this season were subject to approval by the DNCG before becoming eligible to participate. In addition, German sportswear company Puma became the official provider of match balls for the season after agreeing to a long term partnership with the Ligue de Football Professionnel.

The season began on 8 August 2009 under a new format with 16 clubs beginning play simultaneously followed by 4 clubs competing the following day. Under the new format, the showcase match of the opening week will contest the winners of the league the previous season and the winners of the second division the previous season. In the match this year, defending champions Bordeaux defeating second division champions Lens 4–1 at the Stade Chaban-Delmas.

On 5 May 2010, Marseille defeated Rennes 3–1 to claim their 9th Ligue 1 title and their first since the 1991–92 season. Because of their Coupe de la Ligue title, Marseille claimed the league and league cup double. It is the second straight season a club has won the league and league cup double with Bordeaux achieving it last season.

== Teams ==
=== Promotion and relegation ===
Teams promoted from 2008–09 Ligue 2

- Champions: Lens
- Runners-up: Montpellier
- 3rd Place: Boulogne

Teams relegated to 2009–10 Ligue 2

- 18th Place: Caen
- 19th Place: Nantes
- 20th Place: Le Havre

=== Stadia and locations ===
Location of teams in 2009–10 Ligue 1

| Club | Location | Venue | Capacity | Avg. attendance |
|---|---|---|---|---|
| Auxerre | Auxerre | Stade de l'Abbé-Deschamps | 24,493 | 11,306 |
| Bordeaux | Bordeaux | Stade Chaban-Delmas | 34,327 | 29,197 |
| Boulogne | Boulogne-sur-Mer | Stade de la Libération | 15,004 | 11,945 |
| Grenoble | Grenoble | Stade des Alpes | 20,000 | 14,130 |
| Le Mans | Le Mans | Stade Léon-Bollée | 17,500 | 9,014 |
| Lens | Lens | Stade Félix-Bollaert | 41,233 | 33,963 |
| Lille | Villeneuve d'Ascq | Stadium Lille Métropole | 21,803 | 14,543 |
| Lorient | Lorient | Stade du Moustoir | 16,669 | 11,291 |
| Lyon | Lyon | Stade Gerland | 41,044 | 35,261 |
| Marseille | Marseille | Stade Vélodrome | 60,031 | 48,941 |
| Monaco | Fontvieille | Stade Louis II | 18,500 | 8,191 |
| Montpellier | Montpellier | Stade de la Mosson | 32,900 | 17,407 |
| Nancy | Tomblaine | Stade Marcel Picot | 20,087 | 16,294 |
| Nice | Nice | Stade du Ray | 17,415 | 8,567 |
| Paris Saint-Germain | Paris | Parc des Princes | 48,712 | 33,022 |
| Rennes | Rennes | Stade de la Route de Lorient | 31,127 | 22,876 |
| Saint-Étienne | Saint-Étienne | Stade Geoffroy-Guichard | 35,616 | 25,876 |
| Sochaux | Montbéliard | Stade Auguste Bonal | 20,025 | 12,628 |
| Toulouse | Toulouse | Stadium Municipal | 35,672 | 19,472 |
| Valenciennes | Valenciennes | Stade Nungesser | 16,547 | 12,123 |

Last updated: 7 April 2010.
Source: AFFLUENCES Par Club

=== Personnel & sponsorships ===
| Team | Chairman | Manager | Kit manufacturer | Shirt sponsors (front) | Shirt sponsors (back) | Shirt sponsors (sleeve) | Shorts sponsors |
|---|---|---|---|---|---|---|---|
| Auxerre | (France) Alain Dujon | (France) Jean Fernandez | Airness | Alain Afflelou/Senoble, Invicta Group | Besson Chaussures | Conseil général de l'Yonne | Besson Chaussures |
| Bordeaux | (France) Jean-Louis Triaud | (France) Laurent Blanc | Puma | Kia | Cdiscount | Pichet Immobilier | Cdiscount |
| Boulogne | (France) Jacques Wattez | (France) Laurent Guyot | Uhlsport | Rabot Dutilleul/SEDEA Electronique/Dia 7, Geodis Calberson, LD Lines | Maillot pour la vie/SEDEA Electronique/Kaspersky | Nord-Pas-de-Calais | Couverture Etancheite Moderne du Nord |
| Grenoble | (Japan) Kazutoshi Watanabe | (Bosnia and Herzegovina) Mehmed Baždarević | Nike | Flash Kado (H)/TchaTche.com (A), ISS | None | None | Samse |
| Le Mans | (France) Henri Legarda | (France) Arnaud Cormier | Kappa | Fermiers de Loué (H)/Le Gaulois(A), Tendances Eco, NTN | Groupama | Système U | NTN |
| Lens | (France) Gervais Martel | (France) Jean-Guy Wallemme | Reebok | Invicta Group, Allianz, Optex | None | Nord-Pas-de-Calais | McCain Foods |
| Lille | (France) Michel Seydoux | (France) Rudi Garcia | Canterbury of New Zealand | Partouche | Partouche | Nord-Pas-de-Calais | None |
| Lorient | (France) Loïc Fery | (France) Christian Gourcuff | Duarig | La Trinitaine, Cap l'Orient Agglomération, B&B Hotels | Eco Breizh | Casino Cafétéria | Armor-Lux |
| Lyon | (France) Jean-Michel Aulas | (France) Claude Puel | Umbro | PlayStation/Betclic (only in UEFA matches), Apicil, MDA Electroménager | MDA Electroménager | None | OLweb.fr |
| Marseille | (France) Jean-Claude Dassier | (France) Didier Deschamps | Adidas | Direct Énergie | Intersport | Touax | Groupama |
| Monaco | (France) Etienne Franzi | (France) Guy Lacombe | Puma | Fedcom, HSBC, Fight Aids Monaco | HSBC | HSBC | Peace and Sport |
| Montpellier | (France) Louis Nicollin | (France) René Girard | Nike | Groupe Nicollin, La Région Languedoc-Roussillon, Dyneff | Montpellier Agglomération | Renault Trucks Grand Lyon | None |
| Nancy | (France) Jacques Rousselot | (Uruguay) Pablo Correa | Baliston | Odalys Vacances, Geodis Calberson, Clairefontaine | UEFA Euro 2016 bid | None | None |
| Nice | (France) Maurice Cohen | (France) Eric Roy | Lotto | Nasuba Express, Takara Multimédia, Métropole Nice Côte d'Azur | Pizzorno Environnement | OGC Nice TV | Métropole Nice Côte d'Azur |
| PSG | (France) Sébastien Bazin | (France) Antoine Kombouaré | Nike | Fly Emirates | PSG TV/Restaurants du Cœur | Poweo | Elior Group |
| Rennes | (France) Frédéric de Saint-Sernin | (France) Frédéric Antonetti | Puma | Samsic, rennes.fr | Blot Immobilier | Association ELA | Breizh Cola |
| Saint-Étienne | (France) Bernard Caiazzo | (France) Alain Perrin | Adidas | Fruité Entreprises, Invicta Group, Conseil général de la Loire en Rhône-Alpes | Funai | Saint-Étienne Métropole | Teisseire |
| Sochaux | (France) Jean-Claude Plessis | (France) Francis Gillot | Lotto | Peugeot, Franche-Comté, Mobil 1 | Pays de Montbéliard Agglomération | None | None |
| Toulouse | (France) Olivier Sadran | (France) Alain Casanova | Airness | Groupe IDEC, JD Promotion | Newrest | None | None |
| Valenciennes | (France) Francis Decourrière | (France) Philippe Montanier | Nike | Toyota (H)/SITA (A) | SITA (H)/Toyota (A) | Nord-Pas-de-Calais | None |

=== Managerial changes ===
| Team | Outgoing manager | Manner of departure | Date of vacancy | Position in the table | Incoming manager | Date of appointment |
|---|---|---|---|---|---|---|
| Marseille | (Belgium) Eric Gerets | Resigned | 12 May 2009 | Pre-season | (France) Didier Deschamps | 1 July 2009 |
| Paris Saint-Germain | (France) Paul Le Guen | End of contract | 30 June 2009 | Pre-season | (France) Antoine Kombouaré | 1 July 2009 |
| Nice | (France) Frédéric Antonetti | End of contract | 30 June 2009 | Pre-season | (France) Didier Ollé-Nicolle | 1 July 2009 |
| Monaco | (Brazil) Ricardo Gomes | End of contract | 30 June 2009 | Pre-season | (France) Guy Lacombe | 1 July 2009 |
| Valenciennes | (France) Antoine Kombouaré | Signed by Paris Saint-Germain | 30 June 2009 | Pre-season | (France) Philippe Montanier | 1 July 2009 |
| Rennes | (France) Guy Lacombe | Signed by Monaco | 30 June 2009 | Pre-season | (France) Frédéric Antonetti | 1 July 2009 |
| Le Mans | (France) Arnaud Cormier | Mutual consent | 30 June 2009 | Pre-season | (Portugal) Paulo Duarte | 1 July 2009 |
| Boulogne | (France) Philippe Montanier | Signed by Valenciennes | 30 June 2009 | Pre-season | (France) Laurent Guyot | 1 July 2009 |
| Montpellier | (France) Rolland Courbis | Mutual consent | 30 June 2009 | Pre-season | (France) René Girard | 1 July 2009 |
| Le Mans | (Portugal) Paulo Duarte | Sacked | 10 December 2009 | 19th | (France) Arnaud Cormier | 10 December 2009 |
| Saint-Étienne | (France) Alain Perrin | Sacked | 15 December 2009 | 18th | (France) Christophe Galtier | 15 December 2009 |
| Nice | (France) Didier Ollé-Nicolle | Sacked | 9 March 2010 | 17th | (France) Eric Roy | 9 March 2010 |

== League table ==
| Pos | Team | Pld | W | D | L | GF | GA | GD | Pts | Qualification or relegation |
|---|---|---|---|---|---|---|---|---|---|---|
| 1 | Marseille (C) | 38 | 23 | 9 | 6 | 69 | 36 | +33 | 78 | Qualification to Champions League group stage |
| 2 | Lyon | 38 | 20 | 12 | 6 | 64 | 38 | +26 | 72 | Qualification to Champions League group stage |
| 3 | Auxerre | 38 | 20 | 11 | 7 | 42 | 29 | +13 | 71 | Qualification to Champions League play-off round |
| 4 | Lille | 38 | 21 | 7 | 10 | 72 | 40 | +32 | 70 | Qualification to Europa League play-off round (Note: Coupe de France winners Paris Saint-Germain qualify for the 2010–11 UEFA Europa League Play-off round of 2010–11 UEFA Europa League.) |
| 5 | Montpellier | 38 | 20 | 9 | 9 | 50 | 40 | +10 | 69 | Qualification to Europa League third qualifying round (Note: Coupe de la Ligue winners Marseille finished as champions, fulfilling a finish of at least 4th place, thus their Europa League Third qualifying round berth will go to the 5th placed team in the league.) |
| 6 | Bordeaux | 38 | 19 | 7 | 12 | 58 | 40 | +18 | 64 | |
| 7 | Lorient | 38 | 16 | 10 | 12 | 54 | 42 | +12 | 58 | |
| 8 | Monaco | 38 | 15 | 10 | 13 | 39 | 45 | −6 | 55 | |
| 9 | Rennes | 38 | 14 | 11 | 13 | 52 | 41 | +11 | 53 | |
| 10 | Valenciennes | 38 | 14 | 10 | 14 | 50 | 50 | 0 | 52 | |
| 11 | Lens | 38 | 12 | 12 | 14 | 40 | 44 | −4 | 48 | |
| 12 | Nancy | 38 | 13 | 9 | 16 | 46 | 53 | −7 | 48 | |
| 13 | Paris Saint-Germain | 38 | 12 | 11 | 15 | 50 | 46 | +4 | 47 | Qualification to Europa League play-off round |
| 14 | Toulouse | 38 | 12 | 11 | 15 | 36 | 36 | 0 | 47 | |
| 15 | Nice | 38 | 11 | 11 | 16 | 41 | 57 | −16 | 44 | |
| 16 | Sochaux | 38 | 11 | 8 | 19 | 28 | 52 | −24 | 41 | |
| 17 | Saint-Étienne | 38 | 10 | 10 | 18 | 27 | 45 | −18 | 40 | |
| 18 | Le Mans (R) | 38 | 8 | 8 | 22 | 36 | 59 | −23 | 32 | Relegation to Ligue 2 |
| 19 | Boulogne (R) | 38 | 7 | 10 | 21 | 31 | 62 | −31 | 31 | Relegation to Ligue 2 |
| 20 | Grenoble (R) | 38 | 5 | 8 | 25 | 31 | 61 | −30 | 23 | Relegation to Ligue 2 |

Source: Ligue 1
Rules for classification: 1) points; 2) goal difference; 3) number of goals scored.
(C) Champions; (R) Relegated

== Results ==
| Home \ Away | AUX | BOR | BOU | GRE | MFC | RCL | LIL | LOR | OL | OM | ASM | MHS | NAL | NIC | PSG | REN | STE | SOC | TFC | VAL |
|---|---|---|---|---|---|---|---|---|---|---|---|---|---|---|---|---|---|---|---|---|
| Auxerre | | 1–0 | 0–0 | 2–0 | 2–1 | 0–0 | 3–2 | 4–1 | 0–3 | 0–0 | 2–0 | 2–1 | 1–3 | 2–0 | 1–1 | 1–0 | 1–0 | 0–1 | 1–1 | 1–0 |
| Bordeaux | 1–2 | | 0–0 | 1–0 | 3–0 | 4–1 | 3–1 | 4–1 | 2–2 | 1–1 | 1–0 | 1–1 | 1–2 | 4–0 | 1–0 | 1–0 | 3–1 | 2–0 | 1–0 | 0–1 |
| Boulogne | 0–0 | 0–2 | | 2–1 | 1–3 | 2–1 | 2–3 | 2–0 | 0–0 | 1–2 | 1–3 | 0–2 | 1–2 | 3–3 | 2–5 | 1–0 | 0–1 | 0–0 | 1–1 | 0–2 |
| Grenoble | 5–0 | 1–3 | 2–0 | | 1–1 | 1–2 | 0–2 | 1–2 | 1–1 | 0–2 | 0–0 | 2–3 | 1–2 | 1–1 | 4–0 | 0–4 | 1–2 | 2–2 | 1–0 | 0–1 |
| Le Mans | 0–1 | 2–1 | 1–1 | 1–0 | | 3–0 | 1–2 | 0–3 | 2–2 | 1–2 | 1–1 | 2–2 | 2–1 | 0–1 | 1–0 | 1–3 | 1–1 | 0–0 | 1–3 | 2–1 |
| Lens | 2–0 | 4–3 | 3–0 | 1–1 | 2–1 | | 1–1 | 1–1 | 0–2 | 1–0 | 3–0 | 0–1 | 2–1 | 2–0 | 1–1 | 2–2 | 1–0 | 0–0 | 0–2 | 1–1 |
| Lille | 1–2 | 2–0 | 3–1 | 1–0 | 3–0 | 1–0 | | 1–2 | 4–3 | 3–2 | 4–0 | 4–1 | 3–1 | 1–1 | 3–1 | 0–0 | 4–0 | 1–0 | 1–1 | 4–0 |
| Lorient | 0–0 | 1–0 | 5–0 | 2–2 | 1–0 | 1–0 | 2–1 | | 1–3 | 1–2 | 2–2 | 2–2 | 3–1 | 4–1 | 1–1 | 1–1 | 4–0 | 1–0 | 1–1 | 3–2 |
| Lyon | 2–1 | 0–1 | 2–0 | 2–0 | 2–0 | 1–0 | 1–1 | 1–0 | | 5–5 | 3–0 | 1–2 | 3–1 | 2–0 | 2–1 | 1–1 | 1–1 | 0–2 | 2–1 | 1–0 |
| Marseille | 0–2 | 0–0 | 2–0 | 2–0 | 2–1 | 1–0 | 1–0 | 1–1 | 2–1 | | 1–2 | 4–2 | 3–1 | 4–1 | 1–0 | 3–1 | 1–0 | 3–0 | 1–1 | 5–1 |
| Monaco | 0–0 | 0–0 | 1–0 | 0–0 | 1–1 | 2–0 | 0–4 | 2–0 | 1–1 | 1–2 | | 4–0 | 2–1 | 3–2 | 2–0 | 1–0 | 1–2 | 2–0 | 1–0 | 2–1 |
| Montpellier | 1–1 | 0–1 | 1–0 | 1–0 | 2–1 | 1–0 | 2–0 | 2–1 | 0–1 | 2–0 | 0–0 | | 0–2 | 1–0 | 1–1 | 3–1 | 2–1 | 2–0 | 1–1 | 2–1 |
| Nancy | 0–1 | 0–3 | 1–3 | 0–2 | 3–2 | 5–1 | 0–4 | 1–0 | 0–2 | 0–3 | 4–0 | 0–0 | | 2–0 | 0–0 | 1–2 | 0–1 | 2–1 | 0–0 | 1–1 |
| Nice | 0–1 | 1–1 | 2–2 | 2–1 | 1–0 | 0–0 | 1–1 | 1–0 | 4–1 | 1–3 | 1–3 | 0–3 | 2–3 | | 1–0 | 1–1 | 1–1 | 0–0 | 1–0 | 3–2 |
| Paris SG | 1–0 | 3–1 | 3–0 | 4–0 | 3–1 | 1–1 | 3–0 | 0–3 | 1–1 | 0–3 | 0–1 | 1–3 | 1–1 | 0–1 | | 1–1 | 3–0 | 4–1 | 1–0 | 2–2 |
| Rennes | 0–1 | 4–2 | 3–0 | 4–0 | 2–1 | 1–1 | 1–2 | 1–0 | 1–2 | 1–1 | 1–0 | 3–0 | 0–0 | 2–2 | 1–0 | | 1–0 | 1–2 | 4–1 | 0–3 |
| Saint-Étienne | 1–1 | 3–1 | 0–1 | 1–0 | 2–0 | 1–4 | 1–1 | 0–2 | 0–1 | 0–0 | 3–0 | 1–0 | 0–0 | 0–2 | 0–0 | 0–0 | | 0–0 | 0–1 | 0–2 |
| Sochaux | 1–2 | 2–3 | 0–3 | 1–0 | 1–0 | 1–2 | 2–1 | 1–0 | 0–4 | 0–1 | 1–0 | 0–1 | 1–1 | 1–0 | 1–4 | 2–0 | 0–2 | | 1–0 | 2–5 |
| Toulouse | 0–3 | 1–2 | 1–0 | 4–0 | 2–0 | 1–0 | 0–2 | 0–1 | 0–0 | 1–1 | 0–0 | 0–1 | 0–0 | 0–2 | 1–0 | 3–2 | 3–1 | 2–0 | | 0–1 |
| Valenciennes | 0–0 | 2–0 | 1–1 | 2–0 | 0–1 | 0–0 | 1–0 | 0–0 | 2–2 | 3–2 | 3–1 | 1–1 | 1–3 | 2–1 | 2–3 | 0–2 | 1–0 | 1–1 | 1–3 | |

Source: Ligue 1
Legend: Blue = home team win; Yellow = draw; Red = away team win.

== Statistics ==
=== Top goalscorers ===
Mamadou Niang won the Trophée du Meilleur Buteur.

| Rank | Player | Club | Goals |
|---|---|---|---|
| 1 | (Senegal) Mamadou Niang | Marseille | 18 |
| 2 | (France) Kevin Gameiro | Lorient | 17 |
| 3 | (Turkey) Mevlüt Erdinç | Paris Saint-Germain | 15 |
| 3 | (Argentina) Lisandro López | Lyon | 15 |
| 5 | (Brazil) Nenê | Monaco | 14 |
| 5 | (Poland) Ireneusz Jeleń | Auxerre | 14 |
| 5 | (France) Loïc Rémy | Nice | 14 |
| 8 | (Ghana) Asamoah Gyan | Rennes | 13 |
| 8 | (France) Pierre-Alain Frau | Lille | 13 |
| 8 | (Ivory Coast) Gervinho | Lille | 13 |
| 8 | (France) Yohan Cabaye | Lille | 13 |

Last updated: 21 May 2010
Source: Règlement du classement des buteurs

== Awards ==
=== Monthly awards ===
==== UNFP Player of the Month ====
| Month | Player | Club |
|---|---|---|
| August | (Argentina) Lisandro López | Lyon |
| September | (France) Hugo Lloris | Lyon |
| October | (Poland) Ireneusz Jeleń | Auxerre |
| November | (France) Fabrice Abriel | Marseille |
| December | (France) Jérémie Janot | Saint-Étienne |
| January | (France) Karim Aït-Fana | Montpellier |
| February | (France) Hatem Ben Arfa | Marseille |
| March | (Belgium) Eden Hazard | Lille |
| April | (Argentina) Lucho González | Marseille |

=== Annual awards ===
The nominees for the Player of the Year, Goalkeeper of the Year, Young Player of the Year, Manager of the Year and Goal of the Year in Ligue 1. The winner was determine at the annual UNFP Awards, which was held on 9 May. The winners are displayed in bold.

==== Player of the Year ====
| Player | Nationality | Club |
|---|---|---|
| Marouane Chamakh | Morocco | Bordeaux |
| Eden Hazard | Belgium | Lille |
| **Lisandro López** | **Argentina** | **Lyon** |
| Mamadou Niang | Senegal | Marseille |

==== Young Player of the Year ====
| Player | Nationality | Club |
|---|---|---|
| Karim Aït-Fana | France | Montpellier |
| **Eden Hazard** | **Belgium** | **Lille** |
| Yann M'Vila | France | Rennes |
| Emmanuel Rivière | France | Saint-Étienne |

==== Goalkeeper of the Year ====
| Player | Nationality | Club |
|---|---|---|
| Cédric Carrasso | France | Bordeaux |
| **Hugo Lloris** | **France** | **Lyon** |
| Steve Mandanda | France | Marseille |
| Stéphane Ruffier | France | Monaco |

==== Manager of the Year ====
| Manager | Nationality | Club |
|---|---|---|
| Laurent Blanc | France | Bordeaux |
| Didier Deschamps | France | Marseille |
| **Jean Fernandez** | **France** | **Auxerre** |
| René Girard | France | Montpellier |

==== Goal of the Year ====
| Manager | Nationality | Club | Match |
|---|---|---|---|
| Ismaël Bangoura | Guinea | Rennes | 8 August 2009 v. Boulogne |
| Michel Bastos | Brazil | Lyon | 29 August 2009 v. Nancy |
| **Mamadou Niang** | **Senegal** | **Marseille** | 19 September 2009 v. Montpellier |
| Matt Moussilou | Republic of the Congo | Boulogne | 13 March 2010 v. Nancy |
| Yohan Cabaye | France | Lille | 18 April 2010 v. Monaco |

==== Team of the Year ====

Ligue 1 Team of the Year

Team of the Year
| **Goalkeeper** | (France) Hugo Lloris (Lyon) | | | |
| **Defenders** | (France) Rod Fanni (Rennes) | (Senegal) Souleymane Diawara (Marseille) | (France) Michaël Ciani (Bordeaux) | (France) Benoît Trémoulinas (Bordeaux) |
| **Midfielders** | (France) Benoît Cheyrou (Marseille) | (France) Yoann Gourcuff (Bordeaux) | (Belgium) Eden Hazard (Lille) | |
| **Forwards** | (Argentina) Lisandro López (Lyon) | (Senegal) Mamadou Niang (Marseille) | (Morocco) Marouane Chamakh (Bordeaux) | |

== Season statistics ==
Updated 11 April 2010

=== Scoring ===
- First goal of the season: Mamadou Niang for Marseille against Grenoble, 1 minute and 34 seconds. (8 August 2009).
- Fastest goal in a match: 1 minute – Roland Lamah for Le Mans against Montpellier. (10 April 2010).
- Goal scored at the latest point in a match: 90+4 minutes and 27 seconds – Sloan Privat for Sochaux against Lens (7 November 2009)
- First own goal of the season: Olivier Monterrubio (Lorient) for Lille, 64 minutes and 38 seconds (9 August 2009)
- First penalty kick of the season: 58 minutes and 44 seconds – Mathieu Coutadeur (scored) for Le Mans against Lyon (8 August 2009).
- First hat-trick of the season: Michel Bastos (Lyon) against Sochaux (21 February 2010).
- Widest winning margin: 5 goals
  - Lorient 5–0 Boulogne (7 November 2009)
  - Grenoble 5–0 Auxerre (6 February 2010)
- Most goals in one match: 10 goals – Lyon 5–5 Marseille (8 November 2009).
- Most goals in one half: 6 goals
  - Lyon v Marseille (8 November 2009); 2–2 at half time, 5–5 final.
  - Boulogne v Paris Saint-Germain (2 December 2009); 1–0 at half time, 2–5 final.

=== Discipline ===
- First yellow card of the season: Sidney Govou for Lyon against Le Mans, 9 minutes and 24 seconds (8 August 2009)
- First red card of the season: Cyril Jeunechamp for Montpellier against Paris Saint-Germain, 32 minutes and 11 seconds (8 August 2009)
- Card given at latest point in a game: Nicolas Penneteau (red) at 90+3 minutes and 44 seconds for Valenciennes against Nancy (8 August 2009)
- Most yellow cards in a single match: 9
  - Rennes 0–1 Auxerre – 4 for Rennes (Fabien Lemoine, Yann M'Vila, Asamoah Gyan, & Lucien Aubey) and 5 for Auxerre (Aurélien Capoue, Cédric Hengbart, Stéphane Grichting, Dennis Oliech, & Jean-Pascal Mignot) (3 October 2009)
- Most red cards in a single match: 3
  - Bordeaux 2–2 Lyon – 2 for Bordeaux (Benoît Trémoulinas and Jussiê) and 1 for Lyon (Anthony Réveillère) (17 April 2010)

=== Miscellaneous ===
- Longest second half injury time: 5 minutes and 56 seconds – Lens against Lille (20 September 2009).
- On 9 August 2009, Bordeaux established a record for most consecutive league wins with 12 surpassing Lille who won 11 consecutive matches in 1949, winning their last four games of the 1948–49 season and their first seven in the 1949–50 season. Bordeaux's streak began during the 2008–09 season on 14 March 2009 following a 2–1 victory over Nice. The club broke the record on the opening match day of this season defeating Lens 4–1. The record lasted for 14 matches before coming to an end on 30 August following the club's 0–0 draw with Marseille.
- On 31 October 2009, Grenoble set a record for most consecutive losses in French football following the club's eleven straight league defeat, an 0–2 loss to Lille. The previous record of ten straight defeats, held by Sète, had been intact since 1947. The losing streak came to an end the following week, on 7 November, following the club's 0–0 draw with Monaco.
