= Klasa okręgowa (Bielsko group) =

Former 6th-tier football league in Poland

- Organising body: Beskid Football Association
- Founded: 1976
- Folded: 2019
- Country: Poland
- Number of clubs: • 18 (1998–2000, 2018–2019) • 17 (2004–2005, 2009–2010, 2012–2013) • 16 (1983–1998, 2000–2004, 2005–2009, 2010–2011, 2013–2018) • 15 (1981–1982, 2011–2012) • 14 (1976–1981, 1982–1983)
- Promotion to: IV liga Silesian group II
- Relegation to: Klasa A (Bielsko, Skoczów, Żywiec groups)
- Domestic cup: Polish Cup

Klasa okręgowa (Bielsko group) was a football league in Poland that operated from 1976 to 2019. It was one of six groups within Silesian Voivodeship, serving as the 6th tier of the Polish football league system, positioned between IV liga and Klasa A. The league was managed by the Beskid Football Association. From the 2000–01 season, it included teams from the Bielsko, Cieszyn, and Żywiec counties, as well as the city of Bielsko-Biała. Prior to this, it covered teams from the former Bielsko Voivodeship.

== History and structure ==
=== Territorial scope ===
The Bielsko group of klasa okręgowa was established in 1976. Initially called the Bielsko Provincial League (1976–1979), it adopted its current name before the 1979–80 season. It originally encompassed the Bielsko Voivodeship, created during the 1975 administrative reform, and included teams from Gmina Zebrzydowice, then part of the Katowice Voivodeship. Following the dissolution of the Bielsko Voivodeship in 1999, the league's scope was redefined from the 2000–01 season, with teams from the newly formed Lesser Poland Voivodeship reassigned to the newly created Wadowice group.

=== Competition format, promotion, and relegation ===
Most seasons followed a standard round-robin format, with each team playing every other team twice. Exceptions were the 1987–88 and 1988–89 seasons, which were split into two phases: the autumn round divided teams into two groups of eight, with the top four from each advancing to a championship group (competing for promotion) and the bottom four to a relegation group in the spring. Until the 1994–95 season, teams earned two points for a win, one for a draw, and zero for a loss; thereafter, a win was worth three points.

=== Sponsors ===
The Bielsko group had two sponsors. In the 2015–16 and 2016–17 seasons, it was officially named the PROFI CREDIT Bielsko League. In the 2017–18 and 2018–19 seasons, it was called the AP-Sport Bielsko League.

=== Dissolution of the league ===
Following a reform by the Silesian Football Association, the 2018–19 season was the final one for the Bielsko group. Teams finishing 2nd to 17th were reassigned to two new klasa okręgowa groups. Clubs from the Bielsko-Biała sub-district, including BKS Stal Bielsko-Biała, Czarni Jaworze, KS Bestwinka, LKS Bestwina, Pasjonat Dankowice, and Rekord Bielsko-Biała II, joined Silesian group V. Teams from the Skoczów and Żywiec sub-districts, such as Błyskawica Drogomyśl, Cukrownik Chybie, Góral 1956 Żywiec, Koszarawa Żywiec, LKS 99 Pruchna, Orzeł Łękawica, Soła Rajcza, Spójnia Zebrzydowice, Tempo Puńców, and WSS Wisła, were placed in Silesian group VI.

== Final standings of seasons 1976–2000 ==
- From 1976 to 1995, 2 points were awarded for a win.
- Designations: (s) – relegated teams, (b) – promoted teams (newcomers).

=== 1976–1987 ===
==== 1976–77 season ====
Pos	Team	M	Pts
1	Beskid Andrychów	26	39
2	KS Chełmek (s)	26	34
3	BBTS Włókniarz Bielsko-Biała (s)	26	34
4	Hejnał Kęty (s)	26	28
5	Kuźnia Ustroń (b)	26	27
6	Koszarawa Żywiec (s)	26	26
7	Cukrownik Chybie	26	25
8	BKS Stal II Bielsko-Biała	26	25
9	Metal Węgierska Górka (s)	26	24
10	Góral 1956 Żywiec (s)	26	24
11	Wisła Strumień (b)	26	23
12	Kalwarianka Kalwaria Zebrzydowska (s)	26	22
13	Skawa Wadowice	26	18
14	KS Cieszyn	26	16

==== 1977–78 season ====
Pos	Team	M	Pts
1	KS Unia Oświęcim (s)	26	38
2	BBTS Włókniarz Bielsko-Biała	26	34
3	KS Chełmek	26	32
4	Kuźnia Ustroń	26	30
5	Czarni Żywiec	26	29
6	Kalwarianka Kalwaria Zebrzydowska	26	27
7	BKS Stal II Bielsko-Biała	26	26
8	Metal Węgierska Górka	26	26
9	Hejnał Kęty	26	25
10	Koszarawa Żywiec	26	24
11	Wisła Strumień	26	23
12	Cukrownik Chybie	26	23
13	Beskid Skoczów (b)	26	16
14	Halniak Maków Podhalański (b)	26	11

==== 1978–79 season ====
Pos	Team	M	Pts
1	BBTS Włókniarz Bielsko-Biała	26	40
2	Koszarawa Żywiec	26	33
3	Hejnał Kęty	26	32
4	Kuźnia Ustroń	26	29
5	KS Chełmek	26	27
6	KS Cieszyn (b)	26	27
7	Beskid Skoczów	26	27
8	Metal Węgierska Górka	26	27
9	Czarni Żywiec	26	25
10	Wisła Strumień	26	22
11	BKS Stal II Bielsko-Biała	26	21
12	Skawa Wadowice (b)	26	21
13	Kalwarianka Kalwaria Zebrzydowska	26	18
14	Cukrownik Chybie	26	15

==== 1979–80 season ====
Pos	Team	M	Pts
1	Unia Oświęcim (s)	26	40
2	KS Chełmek	26	39
3	Metal Węgierska Górka	26	37
4	Koszarawa Żywiec	26	33
5	Beskid Skoczów	26	32
6	Piast Cieszyn	26	28
7	Kuźnia Ustroń	26	26
8	Czarni Żywiec	26	23
9	BKS Stal II Bielsko-Biała	26	23
10	Hejnał Kęty	26	21
11	Skawa Wadowice	26	19
12	Beskid Bielsko-Biała (b)	26	16
13	Wisła Strumień	26	14
14	Iskra Klecza Dolna (b)	26	13

==== 1980–81 season ====
Pos	Team	M	Pts
1	BBTS Włókniarz Bielsko-Biała (s)	26	37
2	Piast Cieszyn	26	32
3	Unia Oświęcim	26	32
4	Beskid Skoczów	26	30
5	Beskid Andrychów (s)	26	28
6	Czarni Żywiec	26	28
7	Metal Węgierska Górka	26	27
8	KS Chełmek	26	27
9	Kuźnia Ustroń	26	26
10	Omag Oświęcim (b)	26	26
11	BKS Stal II Bielsko-Biała	26	25
12	Koszarawa Żywiec	26	23
13	Hejnał Kęty	26	20
14	Skawa Wadowice	26	3

==== 1981–82 season ====
Pos	Team	M	Pts
1	Beskid Skoczów	28	40
2	BKS Stal II Bielsko-Biała	28	38
3	KS Chełmek	28	38
4	Hejnał Kęty	28	35
5	Koszarawa Żywiec	28	34
6	Beskid Andrychów	28	33
7	Piast Cieszyn	28	32
8	Metal Węgierska Górka	28	30
9	BBTS Włókniarz Bielsko-Biała	28	28
10	Unia Oświęcim	28	27
11	Cukrownik Chybie (b)	28	23
12	Kuźnia Ustroń	28	22
13	Czarni Żywiec	28	19
14	Kalwarianka Kalwaria Zebrzydowska (b)	28	15
15	Omag Oświęcim	28	6

==== 1982–83 season ====
Pos	Team	M	Pts
1	Unia Oświęcim	26	40
2	Hejnał Kęty	26	34
3	BKS Stal II Bielsko-Biała	26	33
4	KS Chełmek	26	29
5	Beskid Andrychów	26	28
6	Metal Węgierska Górka	26	28
7	Cukrownik Chybie	26	27
8	Koszarawa Żywiec	26	22
9	Piast Cieszyn	26	22
10	Wilamowiczanka Wilamowice (b)	26	22
11	Babia Góra Sucha Beskidzka (b)	26	21
12	Czarni Żywiec	26	20
13	Kuźnia Ustroń	26	20
14	BBTS Włókniarz Bielsko-Biała	26	18

==== 1983–84 season ====
Pos	Team	M	Pts
1	Cukrownik Chybie	30	43
2	Koszarawa Żywiec	30	36
3	Metal Węgierska Górka	30	35
4	Hejnał Kęty	30	34
5	KS Chełmek	30	33
6	Babia Góra Sucha Beskidzka	30	33
7	Skawa Wadowice (b)	30	32
8	BKS Stal II Bielsko-Biała	30	31
9	Czarni Żywiec	30	31
10	Beskid Andrychów	30	31
11	Wilamowiczanka Wilamowice	30	31
12	Piast Cieszyn	30	31
13	Brzezina Osiek (b)	30	28
14	Kuźnia Ustroń	30	26
15	Drzewiarz Jasienica (b)	30	16
16	Śrubiarnia Żywiec (b)	30	9

==== 1984–85 season ====
Pos	Team	M	Pts
1	Góral Żywiec (b)	30	42
2	Unia Oświęcim (s)	30	42
3	Skawa Wadowice	30	33
4	Piast Cieszyn	30	33
5	BKS Stal II Bielsko-Biała	30	32
6	KS Chełmek	30	30
7	Hejnał Kęty	30	30
8	Budowlani Bielsko-Biała (b)	30	30
9	Beskid Andrychów	30	30
10	Wilamowiczanka Wilamowice	30	30
11	Czarni Żywiec	30	29
12	Pasjonat Dankowice (b)	30	29
13	Koszarawa Żywiec	30	25
14	Metal Węgierska Górka	30	25
15	Babia Góra Sucha Beskidzka	30	24
16	Astra Spytkowice (b)	30	16

==== 1985–86 season ====
Pos	Team	M	Pts
1	Beskid Andrychów	30	40
2	Unia Oświęcim	30	38
3	Hejnał Kęty	30	35
4	KS Chełmek	30	33
5	Cukrownik Chybie (s)	30	31
6	Wilamowiczanka Wilamowice	30	31
7	Czarni Żywiec	30	30
8	Piast Cieszyn	30	30
9	Beskid Skoczów (s)	30	30
10	Soła Oświęcim (b)	30	30
11	Budowlani Bielsko-Biała	30	30
12	BBTS Włókniarz Bielsko-Biała (b)	30	28
13	Garbarz Zembrzyce (b)	30	28
14	BKS Stal II Bielsko-Biała	30	27
15	Skawa Wadowice	30	24
16	Śrubiarnia Żywiec (b)	30	15

==== 1986–87 season ====
Pos	Team	M	Pts
1	Góral Żywiec (s)	30	48
2	BBTS Włókniarz Bielsko-Biała	30	42
3	Soła Oświęcim	30	32
4	Unia Oświęcim	30	31
5	Hejnał Kęty	30	31
6	Halniak Maków Podhalański (b)	30	31
7	Kuźnia Ustroń (b)	30	29
8	Czarni Żywiec	30	29
9	Budowlani Bielsko-Biała	30	29
10	Wilamowiczanka Wilamowice	30	29
11	Cukrownik Chybie	30	27
12	KS Chełmek	30	27
13	Piast Cieszyn	30	25
14	LKS Dankowice (b)	30	24
15	Beskid Skoczów	30	24
16	Koszarawa Żywiec (b)	30	22

=== 1987–1989 ===
In the 1987–88 and 1988–89 seasons, an experimental competition format was implemented. Before the autumn round, the district league teams were divided into Groups I and II, each with 8 teams. After the autumn round, the top 4 teams from each group advanced to Group A (competing for promotion), while the bottom 4 teams moved to Group B (competing to avoid relegation). Results from the autumn round were not carried over to the final standings.

==== 1987–88 season ====
Group I
Pos	Team	M	Pts
1	Czarni Żywiec	14	21
2	Beskid Andrychów (s)	14	18
3	Soła Kobiernice (b)	14	16
4	Kuźnia Ustroń	14	15
5	Beskid Brenna (b)	14	13
6	Soła Oświęcim	14	13
7	Hejnał Kęty	14	9
8	Cukrownik Chybie	14	7
Group II
Pos	Team	M	Pts
1	BBTS Włókniarz Bielsko-Biała	14	21
2	Unia Oświęcim	14	18
3	Halniak Maków Podhalański	14	15
4	KS Chełmek	14	14
5	Budowlani Bielsko-Biała	14	12
6	Śrubiarnia Żywiec (b)	14	11
7	Skawa Wadowice (b)	14	11
8	Wilamowiczanka Wilamowice	14	10

Group A
Pos	Team	M	Pts
1	Beskid Andrychów (s)	14	22
2	Czarni Żywiec	14	19
3	BBTS Włókniarz Bielsko-Biała	14	18
4	KS Chełmek	14	16
5	Unia Oświęcim	14	15
6	Kuźnia Ustroń	14	13
7	Soła Kobiernice (b)	14	8
8	Halniak Maków Podhalański	14	1
Group B
Pos	Team	M	Pts
1	Hejnał Kęty	14	22
2	Soła Oświęcim	14	16
3	Skawa Wadowice (b)	14	16
4	Beskid Brenna (b)	14	15
5	Cukrownik Chybie	14	13
6	Budowlani Bielsko-Biała	14	13
7	Wilamowiczanka Wilamowice	14	11
8	Śrubiarnia Żywiec (b)	14	6

==== 1988–89 season ====
Group I
Pos	Team	M	Pts
1	Góral Żywiec (s)	14	23
2	BBTS Włókniarz Bielsko-Biała	14	23
3	Hejnał Kęty	14	18
4	Unia Oświęcim	14	17
5	Pasjonat Dankowice (b)	14	14
6	Kalwarianka Kalwaria Zebrzydowska (b)	14	10
7	Soła Kobiernice	14	6
8	Soła Oświęcim	14	1
Group II
Pos	Team	M	Pts
1	Kuźnia Ustroń	14	19
2	Beskid Brenna	14	18
3	Beskid Skoczów (b)	14	17
4	Czarni Żywiec	14	17
5	KS Chełmek	14	14
6	Koszarawa Żywiec (b)	14	13
7	Skawa Wadowice	14	13
8	Halniak Maków Podhalański	14	1

Group A
Pos	Team	M	Pts
1	Unia Oświęcim	14	23
2	BBTS Włókniarz Bielsko-Biała	14	22
3	Góral Żywiec (s)	14	19
4	Hejnał Kęty	14	16
5	Beskid Brenna	14	10
6	Czarni Żywiec	14	8
7	Kuźnia Ustroń	14	7
8	Beskid Skoczów (b)	14	7
Group B
Pos	Team	M	Pts
1	Skawa Wadowice	14	18
2	Koszarawa Żywiec (b)	14	18
3	Soła Kobiernice	14	16
4	KS Chełmek	14	16
5	Pasjonat Dankowice (b)	14	15
6	Kalwarianka Kalwaria Zebrzydowska (b)	14	12
7	Halniak Maków Podhalański	14	11
8	Soła Oświęcim	14	6

=== 1989–2000 ===
==== 1989–90 season ====
Pos	Team	M	Pts
1	Hejnał Kęty	30	52
2	Górnik Kaczyce (b)	30	50
3	Koszarawa Żywiec	30	40
4	Beskid Brenna	30	35
5	Beskid Skoczów	30	34
6	Soła Kobiernice	30	33
7	Czarni Żywiec	30	32
8	Kuźnia Ustroń	30	32
9	Kalwarianka Kalwaria Zebrzydowska	30	29
10	KS Chełmek	30	28
11	Skawa Wadowice	30	26
12	Pasjonat Dankowice	30	24
13	Brzezina Osiek (b)	30	23
14	Strażak Wilkowice (b)	30	18
15	Iskra Klecza Dolna (b)	30	15
16	Halniak Maków Podhalański	30	9

==== 1990–91 season ====
Pos	Team	M	Pts
1	Piast Cieszyn (b)	30	47
2	Beskid Brenna	30	45
3	Skawa Wadowice	30	37
4	Czarni Żywiec	30	36
5	Morcinek Kaczyce	30	33
6	Beskid Skoczów	30	31
7	Kuźnia Ustroń	30	31
8	Hejnał II Kęty (b)	30	30
9	KS Chełmek	30	29
10	Koszarawa Żywiec	30	29
11	Pasjonat Dankowice	30	27
12	Kalwarianka Kalwaria Zebrzydowska	30	26
13	Śrubiarnia Żywiec (b)	30	25
14	Soła Kobiernice	30	23
15	Brzezina Osiek	30	22
16	Naroże Juszczyn (b)	30	8

==== 1991/–92 season ====
Pos	Team	M	Pts
1	Kalwarianka Kalwaria Zebrzydowska	30	41
2	Hejnał II Kęty	30	38
3	Beskid Skoczów	30	37
4	Morcinek Kaczyce	30	33
5	Pasjonat Dankowice	30	33
6	Skawa Wadowice	30	33
7	Czarni Żywiec	30	32
8	Niwa Nowa Wieś (b)	30	30
9	RKS FSM Bielsko-Biała (b)	30	29
10	Koszarawa Żywiec	30	28
11	Śrubiarnia Żywiec	30	28
12	KS Chełmek	30	26
13	Beskid Brenna	30	26
14	LKS Milówka (b)	30	25
15	Stanisławianka Stanisław Dolny (b)	30	23
16	Kuźnia Ustroń	30	18

==== 1992–93 season ====
Pos	Team	M	Pts
1	Morcinek Kaczyce	30	47
2	Skawa Wadowice	30	42
3	Beskid Skoczów	30	40
4	Pasjonat Dankowice	30	38
5	Unia II Oświęcim (b)	30	33
6	KS Chełmek	30	30
7	Beskid Brenna	30	29
8	Hejnał II Kęty	30	29
9	Czarni Żywiec	30	27
10	Niwa Nowa Wieś	30	27
11	Budowlani Bielsko-Biała (b)	30	26
12	Leskowiec Rzyki (b)	30	25
13	Śrubiarnia Żywiec	30	24
14	RKS FSM Bielsko-Biała	30	24
15	Soła Rajcza (b)	30	23
16	Koszarawa Żywiec	30	16

==== 1993–94 season ====
Pos	Team	M	Pts
1	Pasjonat Dankowice	30	49
2	Beskid Skoczów	30	47
3	Skawa Wadowice	30	43
4	Cukrownik Chybie (b)	30	37
5	Beskid Brenna	30	35
6	LKS Milówka (b)	30	34
7	Zapora Porąbka (b)	30	33
8	Czarni Żywiec	30	31
9	Śrubiarnia Żywiec	30	28
10	KS Chełmek	30	26
11	Relaks Wysoka (b)	30	26
12	Niwa Nowa Wieś	30	25
13	Leskowiec Rzyki	30	21
14	Unia II Oświęcim	30	19
15	Budowlani Bielsko-Biała	30	14
16	Hejnał II Kęty	30	10

==== 1994–95 season ====
Pos	Team	M	Pts
1	Beskid Skoczów	30	41
2	Hejnał Kęty (s)	30	38
3	Kuchnie Izdebnik (b)	30	36
4	Zapora Porąbka	30	36
5	Beskid Andrychów (s)	30	35
6	Cukrownik Chybie	30	32
7	KS Chełmek	30	31
8	LKS Bulowice (b)	30	31
9	Czarni Żywiec	30	29
10	Skawa Wadowice	30	29
11	LKS Milówka	30	29
12	Beskid Brenna	30	28
13	Metal Węgierska Górka (b)	30	27
14	Śrubiarnia Żywiec	30	23
15	Wisła Strumień (b)	30	21
16	Relaks Wysoka	30	14

==== 1995–96 season ====
Pos	Team	M	Pts
1	KS Chełmek	30	56
2	Podhalanka Milówka	30	56
3	LKS Bulowice	30	55
4	Beskid Brenna	30	51
5	Beskid Andrychów	30	50
6	Cukrownik Chybie	30	48
7	Koszarawa Żywiec (b)	30	46
8	Skawa Wadowice	30	43
9	Babia Góra Sucha Beskidzka (b)	30	42
10	Wilamowiczanka Wilamowice (b)	30	39
11	Inter Bielsko-Biała (b)	30	38
12	Hejnał Kęty	30	38
13	Czarni Żywiec	30	33
14	Zapora Porąbka	30	30
15	Kuchnie Izdebnik	30	24
16	Metal Węgierska Górka	30	15

==== 1996–97 season ====
Pos	Team	M	Pts
1	LKS Bulowice	30	59
2	Garbarz Zembrzyce (b)	30	54
3	Beskid Andrychów	30	53
4	Babia Góra Sucha Beskidzka	30	51
5	Śrubiarnia Żywiec (b)	30	49
6	Pionier Pisarzowice (b)	30	47
7	Koszarawa Żywiec	30	45
8	Skawa Wadowice	30	44
9	Podhalanka Milówka	30	42
10	Cukrownik Chybie	30	41
11	Hejnał Kęty	30	39
12	Kuźnia Ustroń (b)	30	37
13	Inter Bielsko-Biała	30	36
14	Wilamowiczanka Wilamowice	30	28
15	Beskid Brenna	30	26
16	Czarni Żywiec	30	21

==== 1997–98 season ====
Pos	Team	M	Pts
1	Garbarz Zembrzyce	30	60
2	BBTS Komorowice (s)	30	55
3	Śrubiarnia Żywiec	30	53
4	Jedność Wieprz (b)	30	53
5	Wisła Strumień (b)	30	50
6	Kuźnia Ustroń	30	47
7	Cukrownik Chybie	30	45
8	Hejnał Kęty	30	43
9	Skawa Wadowice	30	43
10	Babia Góra Sucha Beskidzka	30	42
11	Koszarawa Żywiec	30	41
12	Pionier Pisarzowice	30	41
13	Stanisławianka Stanisław Dolny (b)	30	37
14	Niwa Nowa Wieś (b)	30	24
15	Podhalanka Milówka	30	19
16	Beskid Andrychów	30	10

==== 1998–99 season ====
Pos	Team	M	Pts
1	BBTS Komorowice	34	94
2	Unia Oświęcim (s)	34	67
3	Śrubiarnia Żywiec	34	63
4	Koszarawa Żywiec	34	62
5	Kuźnia Ustroń	34	52
6	Wisła Strumień	34	52
7	Hejnał Kęty	34	51
8	Babia Góra Sucha Beskidzka	34	48
9	Zapora Porąbka (b)	34	46
10	Cukrownik Chybie	34	44
11	Skawa Wadowice	34	43
12	Jedność Wieprz	34	42
13	Iskra Klecza Dolna (b)	34	41
14	Morcinek Kaczyce (s)	34	35
15	Metal Węgierska Górka (b)	34	32
16	KS Chełmek (s)	34	30
17	Pionier Pisarzowice	34	29
18	Beskid Brenna (b)	34	21

==== 1999–00 season ====
Pos	Team	M	Pts	Notes
1	Piast Cieszyn (s)	34	68	Promoted to IV liga
2	Kalwarianka Kalwaria Zebrzydowska (s)	34	66	Promoted to IV liga
3	Unia Oświęcim	34	66	Promoted to IV liga
4	Zapora Porąbka	34	62	
5	Beskid Andrychów (b)	34	56	Transferred to Wadowice group
6	Koszarawa Żywiec	34	55	
7	Babia Góra Sucha Beskidzka	34	52	Transferred to Wadowice group
8	Hejnał Kęty	34	47	Transferred to Wadowice group
9	Cukrownik Chybie	34	47	
10	Kuźnia Ustroń	34	44	
11	Skawa Wadowice	34	40	Transferred to Wadowice group
12	LKS Jawiszowice (b)	34	39	Transferred to Wadowice group
13	Iskra Klecza Dolna	34	37	Transferred to Wadowice group
14	Jedność Wieprz	34	37	
15	Śrubiarnia Żywiec	34	37	
16	Wisła Strumień	34	33	
17	LKS Kończyce Małe (b)	34	32	
18	Soła Rajcza (b)	34	31	Relegated to Klasa A

== Final standings for each season from 2000–01 ==
=== 2000–01 season ===
Due to the 2000 league system reform, based on the new administrative division of the country (1 January 1999), the composition and promotion/relegation rules for the Bielsko-Biała group changed significantly compared to the 1999–00 season. Babia Góra Sucha Beskidzka, Beskid Andrychów, Hejnał Kęty, Iskra Klecza Dolna, LKS Jawiszowice, and Skawa Wadowice were transferred to the newly created Wadowice group, while LKS Bestwina, Przełom Kaniów, and Sokół Zabrzeg moved from the Katowice I group to the Bielsko-Biała group.

Position	Team	Matches played	Wins	Draws	Losses	Goals for/Goals against	Goal difference	Points	Notes	Head-to-head
1	Koszarawa Żywiec	30	22	5	3	60–24	+36	71	Promoted to IV liga	
2	Kuźnia Ustroń	30	21	4	5	69–29	+40	67		
3	Sokół Zabrzeg	30	18	4	8	50–28	+22	58		
4	Kontakt Czechowice-Dziedzice	30	16	4	10	60–53	+7	52		
5	LKS Kończyce Małe	30	15	4	11	46–41	+5	49		
6	Cukrownik Chybie	30	13	5	12	40–44	−4	44		
7	Spójnia Zebrzydowice	30	12	6	12	63–43	+20	42		
8	LKS Bestwina	30	11	6	13	47–40	+7	39		BES 3 pts, 5–4; MIL 3 pts, 4–5
9	Podhalanka Milówka	30	11	6	13	44–46	−2	39		BES 3 pts, 5–4; MIL 3 pts, 4–5
10	Zapora Porąbka	30	11	4	15	44–53	−9	37		
11	Jedność Wieprz	30	9	5	16	44–75	−31	32		WIE 4 pts; KOB 1 pt
12	Soła Kobiernice	30	8	8	14	40–54	−14	32		WIE 4 pts; KOB 1 pt
13	Stal-Śrubiarnia Żywiec	30	8	7	15	40–49	−9	31		
14	Orzeł Kozy	30	8	6	16	28–39	−11	30		
15	Przełom Kaniów	30	9	1	20	43–68	−25	28	Relegated to Klasa A	PKA 6 pts; WST 0 pts
16	Wisła Strumień	30	7	7	16	32–64	−32	28	Relegated to Klasa A	PKA 6 pts; WST 0 pts

=== 2001–02 season ===
Changes in team composition: Promoted from A-class 2000–01: LKS Czaniec (Bielsko-Biała group champion), Beskid II Skoczów (Skoczów group champion), and Czarni-Góral II Żywiec (Żywiec group champion).

Pos	Team	M	W	D	L	GF/GA	GD	Pts	Notes	H2H
1	Sokół Zabrzeg	30	22	4	4	70–23	+47	70	Promoted to IV liga	
2	LKS Czaniec	30	20	8	2	75–24	+51	68		
3	Zapora Porąbka	30	15	6	9	62–39	+23	51		
4	Kuźnia Ustroń	30	13	6	11	58–46	+12	45		KUŹ – CUK 4:2; CUK – KUŹ 0:2
5	Cukrownik Chybie	30	12	9	9	48–42	+6	45		KUŹ – CUK 4:2; CUK – KUŹ 0:2
6	Spójnia Zebrzydowice	30	12	8	10	57–57	0	44		SPZ – SOŁ 3:0; SOŁ – SPZ 2:2
7	Soła Kobiernice	30	12	8	10	46–45	+1	44		SPZ – SOŁ 3:0; SOŁ – SPZ 2:2
8	LKS Bestwina	30	11	8	11	49–50	−1	41		
9	Podhalanka Milówka	30	11	6	13	60–43	+17	39		
10	Czarni-Góral II Żywiec	30	10	8	12	49–57	−8	38		
11	Beskid II Skoczów	30	10	6	14	52–62	−10	36		
12	Stal-Śrubiarnia Żywiec	30	10	5	15	40–48	−8	35		ŚRU – ORZ 3:0; ORZ – ŚRU 2:1
13	Orzeł Kozy	30	10	5	15	48–57	−9	35		ŚRU – ORZ 3:0; ORZ – ŚRU 2:1
14	Jedność Wieprz	30	9	5	16	45–89	−44	32	Relegated to Klasa A	JED – KOŃ 1:3; KOŃ – JED 0:3
15	LKS Kończyce Małe	30	9	5	16	50–70	−20	32	Relegated to Klasa A	JED – KOŃ 1:3; KOŃ – JED 0:3
16	Kontakt Czechowice-Dziedzice	30	3	5	22	42–99	−57	14	Relegated, team disbanded	

=== 2002–03 season ===
Changes in team composition:

- Relegated from IV liga 2001–02: Walcownia Czechowice-Dziedzice (15th place in Śląska II group).
- Promoted from A-class 2001–02: Wilamowiczanka Wilamowice (Bielsko-Biała group champion), Morcinek Kaczyce (Skoczów group champion), and Beskid Gilowice (Żywiec group champion).

Pos	Team	M	W	D	L	GF/GA	GD	Pts	Notes	H2H
1	Walcownia Czechowice-Dziedzice	30	24	4	2	90–24	+66	76	Promoted to IV liga	
2	LKS Czaniec	30	18	8	4	73–28	+45	62		
3	Kuźnia Ustroń	30	19	2	9	62–35	+27	59		
4	Zapora Porąbka	30	15	6	9	56–37	+19	51		
5	Morcinek Kaczyce	30	13	6	11	52–45	+7	45		
6	Orzeł Kozy	30	13	5	12	42–48	−6	44		
7	Cukrownik Chybie	30	11	10	9	40–34	+6	43		
8	LKS Bestwina	30	12	6	12	50–46	+4	42		
9	Beskid Gilowice	30	12	5	13	45–50	−5	41		GIL – SOŁ 4:1; SOŁ – GIL 1:0
10	Soła Kobiernice	30	12	5	13	41–52	−11	41		GIL – SOŁ 4:1; SOŁ – GIL 1:0
11	Wilamowiczanka Wilamowice	30	11	7	12	45–43	+2	40		
12	Podhalanka Milówka	30	10	9	11	60–66	−6	39		
13	Spójnia Zebrzydowice	30	9	10	11	49–48	+1	37	Relegated to Klasa A	
14	Beskid II Skoczów	30	7	6	17	35–60	−25	27	Relegated to Klasa A	
15	Czarni-Góral II Żywiec	30	2	7	21	32–85	−53	13	Withdrawn after season	
16	Stal-Śrubiarnia Żywiec	30	3	2	25	20–91	−71	11	Withdrawn after 17th round	

=== 2003–04 season ===
Changes in team composition:

- Relegated from IV liga 2002–03: Sokół Zabrzeg (14th place in Śląska II group).
- Promoted from A-class 2002–03: Sokół Hecznarowice (Bielsko-Biała group champion), Tempo Puńców (Skoczów group champion), and Skałka Żabnica (Żywiec group champion).

Pos	Team	M	W	D	L	GF/GA	GD	Pts	Notes	H2H
1	Beskid Skoczów	30	21	5	4	80–30	+50	68	Promoted to IV liga	
2	LKS Czaniec	30	18	6	6	61–28	+33	60		
3	Morcinek Kaczyce	30	13	9	8	43–27	+16	48		
4	Zapora Porąbka	30	14	4	12	36–38	−2	46		
5	Wilamowiczanka Wilamowice	30	13	6	11	39–36	+3	45		
6	Kuźnia Ustroń	30	13	4	13	49–41	+8	43		KUŹ – GIL 4:0; GIL – KUŹ 2:1
7	Beskid Gilowice	30	13	4	13	44–47	−3	43		KUŹ – GIL 4:0; GIL – KUŹ 2:1
8	LKS Bestwina	30	12	6	12	46–44	+2	42		BES – CUK 5:2; CUK – BES 1:1
9	Cukrownik Chybie	30	12	6	12	50–50	0	42		BES – CUK 5:2; CUK – BES 1:1
10	Soła Kobiernice	30	11	8	11	39–43	−4	41		
11	Sokół Zabrzeg	30	13	1	16	48–52	−4	40		
12	Skałka Żabnica	30	11	6	13	40–50	−10	39		
13	Sokół Hecznarowice	30	9	8	13	39–57	−18	35	Relegated to Klasa A	
14	Podhalanka Milówka	30	8	5	17	33–59	−26	29	Relegated to Klasa A	
15	Tempo Puńców	30	8	4	18	54–69	−15	28	Relegated to Klasa A	
16	Orzeł Kozy	30	7	6	17	24–54	−30	27	Relegated to Klasa A	

=== 2004–05 season ===
Source:n

Changes in team composition:

- Relegated from IV liga 2003–04: Walcownia Czechowice-Dziedzice (14th place in Śląska II group) and BKS Stal Bielsko-Biała (15th place in Śląska II group).
- Promoted from A-class 2003–04: Podbeskidzie II Bielsko-Biała (Bielsko-Biała group champion), Rekord Bielsko-Biała (2nd place in Bielsko-Biała group), Spójnia Zebrzydowice (Skoczów group champion), and Koszarawa II Żywiec (Żywiec group champion).

Pos	Team	M	W	D	L	GF/GA	GD	Pts	Notes	H2H
1	BKS Stal Bielsko-Biała	32	27	3	2	119–24	+95	84	Promoted to IV liga	
2	Skałka Żabnica	32	21	3	8	91–39	+52	66		
3	Podbeskidzie II Bielsko-Biała	32	17	6	9	54–37	+17	57		POD – CZA 4:1; CZA – POD 0:0
4	LKS Czaniec	32	17	6	9	70–41	+29	57		POD – CZA 4:1; CZA – POD 0:0
5	Koszarawa II Żywiec	32	15	5	12	42–34	+8	50		
6	LKS Bestwina	32	14	6	12	63–50	+13	48		
7	Wilamowiczanka Wilamowice	32	15	2	15	67–58	+9	47		
8	Morcinek Kaczyce	32	13	7	12	43–47	−4	46		MOR – KUŹ 1:1; KUŹ – MOR 0:1
9	Kuźnia Ustroń	32	13	7	12	59–46	+13	46		MOR – KUŹ 1:1; KUŹ – MOR 0:1
10	Zapora Porąbka	32	12	7	13	50–54	−4	43		
11	Walcownia Czechowice-Dziedzice	32	11	9	12	40–51	−11	42		
12	Sokół Zabrzeg	32	10	11	11	59–62	−3	41		SZA – KOB 0:0; KOB – SZA 1:1
13	Soła Kobiernice	32	10	11	11	43–50	−7	41		SZA – KOB 0:0; KOB – SZA 1:1
14	Rekord Bielsko-Biała	32	10	7	15	46–54	−8	37		
15	Cukrownik Chybie	32	8	7	17	54–72	−18	31	Relegated to Klasa A	
16	Beskid Gilowice	32	5	2	25	26–101	−75	17	Relegated to Klasa A	
17	Spójnia Zebrzydowice	32	3	3	26	25–131	−106	12	Relegated to Klasa A	

=== 2005–06 season ===
Changes in team composition: Promoted from A-class 2004–05: Przełom Kaniów (Bielsko-Biała group champion), Wyzwolenie Simoradz (Skoczów group champion), and Orzeł Łękawica (Żywiec group champion).

Pos	Team	M	W	D	L	GF/GA	GD	Pts	Notes	H2H
1	Skałka Żabnica	30	24	4	2	83–23	+60	76	Promoted to IV liga	
2	LKS Czaniec	30	21	6	3	85–26	+59	69		
3	Sokół Zabrzeg	30	19	6	5	69–36	+33	63		
4	LKS Bestwina	30	15	7	8	44–40	+4	52		
5	Kuźnia Ustroń	30	14	7	9	62–48	+14	49		KUŹ – REK 1:1; REK – KUŹ 2:2
6	Rekord Bielsko-Biała	30	14	7	9	56–35	+21	49		KUŹ – REK 1:1; REK – KUŹ 2:2
7	Zapora Porąbka	30	13	9	8	48–34	+14	48		
8	MRKS Czechowice-Dziedzice	30	11	8	11	48–40	+8	41		
9	Podbeskidzie II Bielsko-Biała	30	11	7	12	36–38	−2	40		
10	Wilamowiczanka Wilamowice	30	9	8	13	42–53	−11	35		WLM – MOR 1:0; MOR – WLM 4:3
11	Morcinek Kaczyce	30	9	8	13	29–42	−13	35		WLM – MOR 1:0; MOR – WLM 4:3
12	Orzeł Łękawica	30	8	3	19	29–63	−34	27		
13	Koszarawa II Żywiec	30	7	4	19	25–55	−30	25	Relegated, team disbanded	
14	Przełom Kaniów	30	6	7	17	25–51	−26	25	Remained in league due to Koszarawa II Żywiec disbandment	KOŻ – PKA 2:0; PKA – KOŻ 0:1
15	Wyzwolenie Simoradz	30	6	6	18	44–72	−28	24	Relegated to Klasa A	
16	Soła Kobiernice	30	2	5	23	15–82	−67	11	Relegated to Klasa A	

=== 2006–07 season ===
Changes in team composition:

- Relegated from IV liga 2005–06: Czarni-Góral Żywiec (15th place in Śląska II group).
- Promoted from A-class 2005–06: Drzewiarz Jasienica (Bielsko-Biała group champion), Cukrownik Chybie (Skoczów group champion), and Podhalanka Milówka (Żywiec group champion).

Pos	Team	M	W	D	L	GF/GA	GD	Pts	Notes	H2H
1	LKS Czaniec	30	24	3	3	89–28	+61	75	Promoted to IV liga	
2	MRKS Czechowice-Dziedzice	30	22	2	6	90–30	+60	68		
3	Zapora Porąbka	30	17	6	7	60–29	+31	57		
4	LKS Bestwina	30	17	5	8	54–34	+20	56		
5	Drzewiarz Jasienica	30	15	8	7	72–38	+34	53		
6	Kuźnia Ustroń	30	16	3	11	66–40	+26	51		KUŹ – SZA 5:1; SZA – KUŹ 2:1
7	Sokół Zabrzeg	30	15	6	9	84–42	+42	51		KUŹ – SZA 5:1; SZA – KUŹ 2:1
8	Czarni-Góral Żywiec	30	15	5	10	54–36	+18	50		
9	Cukrownik Chybie	30	13	6	11	49–44	+5	45		
10	Morcinek Kaczyce	30	10	9	11	52–41	+11	39		MOR – POD 10:0; POD – MOR 1:1
11	Podbeskidzie II Bielsko-Biała	30	12	3	15	44–57	−13	39		MOR – POD 10:0; POD – MOR 1:1
12	Rekord Bielsko-Biała	30	10	8	12	56–49	+7	38		
13	Podhalanka Milówka	30	6	5	19	27–79	−52	23		
14	Przełom Kaniów	30	5	2	23	30–89	−59	17	Relegated to Klasa A	
15	Wilamowiczanka Wilamowice	30	4	1	25	24–116	−92	13	Relegated to Klasa A	
16	Orzeł Łękawica	30	3	0	27	16–115	−99	9	Relegated to Klasa B; withdrew after 17th round	

=== 2007–08 season ===
The last edition before the 2008 league system reform, which made the district league the sixth level in the hierarchy (previously the fifth). As a result, Rekord Bielsko-Biała and Zapora Porąbka effectively remained at the fifth level, teams in positions 3–14 were relegated one level, and LKS Bestwina and Podhalanka Milówka were relegated two levels.

Changes in team composition:

- Relegated from IV liga 2006–07: Pasjonat Dankowice (15th place in Śląska II group).
- Promoted from A-class 2006–07: Spójnia Landek (Bielsko-Biała group champion), Mieszko Piast Cieszyn (Skoczów group champion), and LKS Radziechowy (Żywiec group champion).

Pos	Team	M	W	D	L	GF/GA	GD	Pts	Notes	H2H
1	Rekord Bielsko-Biała	30	19	8	3	78–33	+45	65	Promoted to IV liga	
2	Zapora Porąbka	30	18	5	7	80–35	+45	59	Promoted to IV liga	POR – CGŻ 2:0; CGŻ – POR 1:0
3	Czarni-Góral Żywiec	30	18	5	7	62–23	+39	59		POR – CGŻ 2:0; CGŻ – POR 1:0
4	MRKS Czechowice-Dziedzice	30	17	7	6	65–29	+36	58		
5	Pasjonat Dankowice	30	14	9	7	52–32	+20	51		
6	Drzewiarz Jasienica	30	14	4	12	48–42	+6	46		
7	Mieszko Piast Cieszyn	30	13	6	11	40–40	0	45		
8	Podbeskidzie II Bielsko-Biała	30	11	10	9	63–45	+18	43		
9	Morcinek Kaczyce	30	11	7	12	41–40	+1	40		
10	Cukrownik Chybie	30	10	7	13	54–57	−3	37		CUK: 6 pts, 9–7; SZA: 6 pts, 10–9; SPL: 6 pts, 9–12
11	Sokół Zabrzeg	30	11	4	15	53–62	−9	37		CUK: 6 pts, 9–7; SZA: 6 pts, 10–9; SPL: 6 pts, 9–12
12	Spójnia Landek	30	10	7	13	54–54	0	37		CUK: 6 pts, 9–7; SZA: 6 pts, 10–9; SPL: 6 pts, 9–12
13	Kuźnia Ustroń	30	10	5	15	45–74	−29	35		
14	LKS Radziechowy	30	8	3	19	38–74	−36	27		
15	LKS Bestwina	30	6	7	17	24–59	−35	25	Relegated to playoffs for district league	
16	Podhalanka Milówka	30	2	2	26	19–117	−98	8	Relegated to Klasa A	

=== 2008–09 season ===
The first edition after the 2008 league system reform, which made the district league the sixth level in the hierarchy (previously the fifth).

Changes in team composition:

- Promoted from A-class 2007–08: Zapora Wapienica (Bielsko-Biała group champion), Błyskawica Drogomyśl (Skoczów group champion), and Świt Cięcina (Żywiec group champion).
- Winner of the district league playoffs: KS Wisła (2nd place in Skoczów A-class group 2007–08).

Pos	Team	M	W	D	L	GF/GA	GD	Pts	Notes	H2H
1	MRKS Czechowice-Dziedzice	30	21	8	1	64–30	+34	71	Promoted to IV liga	
2	Podbeskidzie II Bielsko-Biała	30	20	6	4	70–30	+40	66		
3	Czarni-Góral Żywiec	30	16	7	7	69–28	+41	55		
4	Morcinek Kaczyce	30	13	9	8	43–37	+6	48		
5	KS Wisła	30	13	5	12	51–52	−1	44		
6	Drzewiarz Jasienica	30	12	7	11	55–38	+17	43		
7	Sokół Zabrzeg	30	12	5	13	60–51	+9	41		
8	Błyskawica Drogomyśl	30	9	11	10	52–51	+1	38		
9	Cukrownik Chybie	30	10	7	13	34–50	−16	37		
10	Świt Cięcina	30	10	6	14	38–48	−10	36		
11	Pasjonat Dankowice	30	10	5	15	43–58	−15	35		PAS – SPL 2:1; SPL – PAS 2:2
12	Spójnia Landek	30	9	8	13	51–58	−7	35		PAS – SPL 2:1; SPL – PAS 2:2
13	LKS Radziechowy	30	9	6	15	40–64	−24	33		RAD – KUŹ 2:2; KUŹ – RAD 0:1
14	Kuźnia Ustroń	30	9	6	15	40–51	−11	33		RAD – KUŹ 2:2; KUŹ – RAD 0:1
15	Zapora Wapienica	30	8	7	15	56–81	−25	31	Relegated to Klasa A	
16	Mieszko Piast Cieszyn	30	6	3	21	40–79	−39	21	Relegated to Klasa A	

=== 2009–10 season ===
Changes in team composition:

- Relegated from III liga 2008–09: Koszarawa Żywiec (group IV).
- Promoted from A-class 2008–09: LKS Bestwina (Bielsko-Biała group champion), Tempo Puńców (Skoczów group champion), and Halny Przyborów (Żywiec group champion).

Pos	Team	M	W	D	L	GF/GA	GD	Pts	Notes	H2H
1	Podbeskidzie II Bielsko-Biała	32	22	6	4	61–26	+35	72	Promoted to IV liga	
2	Czarni-Góral Żywiec	32	19	3	10	57–33	+24	60		
3	Błyskawica Drogomyśl	32	16	7	9	66–31	+35	55		
4	Morcinek Kaczyce	32	16	6	10	56–40	+16	54		
5	KS Wisła	32	15	8	9	53–31	+22	53		
6	Drzewiarz Jasienica	32	15	7	10	56–32	+24	52		
7	LKS Radziechowy	32	15	6	11	58–46	+12	51		
8	Koszarawa Żywiec	32	14	7	11	46–46	0	49		
9	Tempo Puńców	32	13	5	14	71–65	+6	44		
10	Spójnia Landek	32	11	9	12	58–50	+8	42		SPL – SZA 1:2; SZA – SPL 2:7
11	Sokół Zabrzeg	32	12	6	14	56–69	−13	42		SPL – SZA 1:2; SZA – SPL 2:7
12	LKS Bestwina	32	11	7	14	40–57	−17	40		
13	Cukrownik Chybie	32	9	10	13	45–47	−2	37		CUK – PAS 2:2; PAS – CUK 2:3
14	Pasjonat Dankowice	32	10	7	15	49–63	−14	37		CUK – PAS 2:2; PAS – CUK 2:3
15	Kuźnia Ustroń	32	7	12	13	41–58	−17	33	Relegated to Klasa A	
16	Świt Cięcina	32	7	4	21	29–83	−54	25	Relegated to Klasa A	
17	Halny Przyborów	32	3	4	25	24–89	−65	13	Relegated to Klasa A	

=== 2010–11 season ===
Changes in team composition: Promoted from A-class 2009–10: Halny Kalna (Bielsko-Biała group champion), Wisła Strumień (Skoczów group champion), and Skrzyczne Lipowa (Żywiec group champion).

Pos	Team	M	W	D	L	GF/GA	GD	Pts	Notes	H2H
1	KS Wisła	30	22	3	5	81–24	+57	69	Promoted to IV liga	
2	Czarni-Góral Żywiec	30	21	5	4	68–20	+48	68	Promoted to IV liga	CGŻ – DRZ 4:0; DRZ – CGŻ 0:1
3	Drzewiarz Jasienica	30	21	5	4	79–27	+52	68		CGŻ – DRZ 4:0; DRZ – CGŻ 0:1
4	Błyskawica Drogomyśl	30	16	6	8	69–47	+22	54		BŁY – TEM 2:2; TEM – BŁY 2:2
5	Tempo Puńców	30	16	6	8	59–38	+21	54		BŁY – TEM 2:2; TEM – BŁY 2:2
6	Spójnia Landek	30	15	6	9	72–49	+23	51		
7	Koszarawa Żywiec	30	15	5	10	65–34	+31	50		
8	LKS Radziechowy	30	13	6	11	46–43	+3	45		
9	Pasjonat Dankowice	30	11	5	14	42–50	−8	38		PAS – CUK 3:2; CUK – PAS 1:1
10	Cukrownik Chybie	30	10	8	12	47–50	−3	38		PAS – CUK 3:2; CUK – PAS 1:1
11	Morcinek Kaczyce	30	10	5	15	53–63	−10	35		
12	LKS Bestwina	30	8	8	14	41–43	−2	32		BES – WST 7:1; WST – BES 1:1
13	Wisła Strumień	30	8	6	16	47–61	−14	30		BES – WST 7:1; WST – BES 1:1
14	Skrzyczne Lipowa	30	8	2	20	41–76	−35	26	Remained in league	
15	Halny Kalna	30	5	5	20	34–103	−69	20	Relegated to Klasa B; No license for Klasa A	
16	Sokół Zabrzeg	30	0	2	28	17–133	−116	2	Relegated to Klasa A	

=== 2011–12 season ===
Changes in team composition:

- Relegated from IV liga 2010–11: Zapora Porąbka (Śląska II group).
- Promoted from A-class 2010–11: Wilamowiczanka Wilamowice (Bielsko-Biała group champion) and Beskid 09 Skoczów (Skoczów group champion).

Pos	Team	M	W	D	L	GF/GA	GD	Pts	Notes	H2H
1	Drzewiarz Jasienica	28	22	3	3	88–15	+73	69	Promoted to IV liga	
2	LKS Radziechowy	28	18	2	8	49–27	+22	56		
3	Pasjonat Dankowice	28	16	7	5	62–41	+21	55		
4	Beskid 09 Skoczów	28	15	6	7	47–25	+22	51		
5	Tempo Puńców	28	14	6	8	60–44	+16	48		
6	Wilamowiczanka Wilamowice	28	14	3	11	58–55	+3	45		
7	LKS Bestwina	28	13	4	11	46–39	+7	43		
8	Cukrownik Chybie	28	13	1	14	45–54	−9	40		
9	Spójnia Landek	28	10	7	11	55–45	+10	37		
10	Morcinek Kaczyce	28	10	4	14	55–59	−4	34		MOR – KOŻ 2:1; KOŻ – MOR 1:2
11	Koszarawa Żywiec	28	10	4	14	31–46	−15	34		MOR – KOŻ 2:1; KOŻ – MOR 1:2
12	Błyskawica Drogomyśl	28	7	7	14	46–53	−7	28		
13	Wisła Strumień	28	6	8	14	44–54	−10	26		
14	Zapora Porąbka	28	6	1	21	30–94	−64	19		
15	Skrzyczne Lipowa	28	4	1	23	24–89	−65	13	Relegated to Klasa A	

=== 2012–13 season ===
Changes in team composition:

- Relegated from III liga 2011–12: Skałka Żabnica (group IV).
- Promoted from A-class 2011–12: Zapora Wapienica (Bielsko-Biała group champion), Kuźnia Ustroń (Skoczów group champion), and PLKS Pewel Mała (Żywiec group champion).

Pos	Team	M	W	D	L	GF/GA	GD	Pts	Notes	H2H
1	Spójnia Landek	32	21	6	5	84–24	+60	69	Promoted to IV liga	
2	Cukrownik Chybie	32	17	6	9	71–61	+10	57		
3	PLKS Pewel Mała	32	16	7	9	72–57	+15	55	Relegated, team disbanded	PEW: 11 pts; MOR: 9 pts; KOŻ: 7 pts; KUŹ: 6 pts
4	Morcinek Kaczyce	32	17	4	11	59–55	+4	55		PEW: 11 pts; MOR: 9 pts; KOŻ: 7 pts; KUŹ: 6 pts
5	Koszarawa Żywiec	32	17	4	11	56–51	+5	55		PEW: 11 pts; MOR: 9 pts; KOŻ: 7 pts; KUŹ: 6 pts
6	Kuźnia Ustroń	32	17	4	11	77–47	+30	55		PEW: 11 pts; MOR: 9 pts; KOŻ: 7 pts; KUŹ: 6 pts
7	Beskid Skoczów	32	14	7	11	68–48	+20	49		SKO – WLM 2:3; WLM – SKO 2:3
8	Wilamowiczanka Wilamowice	32	15	4	13	65–60	+5	49		SKO – WLM 2:3; WLM – SKO 2:3
9	Pasjonat Dankowice	32	15	3	14	62–53	+9	48		
10	Zapora Porąbka	32	13	7	12	48–43	+5	46		POR – RAW 0:2; RAW – POR 3:5
11	GKS Radziechowy-Wieprz	32	13	7	12	74–58	+16	46		POR – RAW 0:2; RAW – POR 3:5
12	Skałka Żabnica	32	13	5	14	58–52	+6	44		
13	Tempo Puńców	32	12	7	13	76–81	−5	43		TEM – BES 3:3; BES – TEM 1:2
14	LKS Bestwina	32	13	4	15	46–59	−13	43	Remained in league	TEM – BES 3:3; BES – TEM 1:2
15	Błyskawica Drogomyśl	32	10	8	14	58–65	−7	38	Relegated to Klasa A	
16	Wisła Strumień	32	4	3	25	35–110	−75	15	Relegated to Klasa A	
17	Zapora Wapienica	32	1	2	29	30–115	−85	5	Relegated to Klasa A	

=== 2013–14 season ===
Changes in team composition:

- Relegated from IV liga 2012–13: MRKS Czechowice-Dziedzice (Śląska II group).
- Promoted from A-class 2012–13: Soła Kobiernice (Bielsko-Biała group champion), LKS 99 Pruchna (Skoczów group champion), and Maksymilian Cisiec (Żywiec group champion).

Pos	Team	M	W	D	L	GF/GA	GD	Pts	Notes	H2H
1	GKS Radziechowy-Wieprz	30	21	6	3	70–25	+45	69	Promoted to IV liga	
2	Koszarawa Żywiec	30	20	3	7	54–29	+25	63		
3	Beskid Skoczów	30	19	5	6	66–36	+30	62		
4	LKS 99 Pruchna	30	17	3	10	74–47	+27	54		PRU – PAS 5:2; PAS – PRU 1:3
5	Pasjonat Dankowice	30	17	3	10	72–32	+40	54		PRU – PAS 5:2; PAS – PRU 1:3
6	MRKS Czechowice-Dziedzice	30	14	8	8	56–36	+20	50		
7	Kuźnia Ustroń	30	13	6	11	53–42	+11	45		
8	Cukrownik Chybie	30	13	4	13	54–50	+4	43		
9	LKS Bestwina	30	11	8	11	45–41	+4	41		
10	Zapora Porąbka	30	11	7	12	44–40	+4	40		
11	Skałka Żabnica	30	11	4	15	50–52	−2	37		
12	Maksymilian Cisiec	30	11	3	16	43–64	−21	36		
13	Soła Kobiernice	30	9	6	15	18–30	−12	33	Relegated to Klasa A	
14	Morcinek Kaczyce	30	6	3	21	31–83	−52	21	Relegated to Klasa A	
15	Tempo Puńców	30	4	4	22	38–101	−63	16	Relegated to Klasa A	
16	Wilamowiczanka Wilamowice	30	5	3	22	17–70	−53	18	Relegated to Klasa A; withdrew after autumn round	

=== 2014–15 season ===
Changes in team composition:

- Relegated from IV liga 2013–14: KS Wisła and Spójnia Landek (Śląska II group).
- Promoted from A-class 2013–14: Czarni Jaworze (Bielsko-Biała group champion), Piast Cieszyn (Skoczów group champion), and Świt Cięcina (Żywiec group champion).

Pos	Team	M	W	D	L	GF/GA	GD	Pts	Notes	H2H
1	Spójnia Landek	30	22	7	1	85–24	+61	73	Promoted to IV liga	
2	KS Wisła	30	22	4	4	102–33	+69	70		
3	Pasjonat Dankowice	30	19	4	7	89–45	+44	61		
4	Beskid Skoczów	30	17	3	10	62–45	+17	54		
5	Kuźnia Ustroń	30	16	4	10	57–43	+14	52		
6	LKS Bestwina	30	15	4	11	48–46	+2	49		
7	Skałka Żabnica	30	12	4	14	59–62	−3	40		
8	Koszarawa Żywiec	30	11	5	14	55–49	+6	38		
9	Świt Cięcina	30	10	6	14	43–53	−10	36		
10	MRKS Czechowice-Dziedzice	30	8	11	11	39–52	−13	35		
11	LKS 99 Pruchna	30	8	9	13	36–47	−11	33		
12	Cukrownik Chybie	30	9	5	16	44–75	−31	32		CUK – MAK 5:1; MAK – CUK 3:2
13	Maksymilian Cisiec	30	9	5	16	51–69	−18	32	Remained in league	CUK – MAK 5:1; MAK – CUK 3:2
14	Piast Cieszyn	30	8	6	16	43–69	−26	30	Relegated to Klasa A	
15	Zapora Porąbka	30	8	5	17	33–71	−38	29	Relegated to Klasa A	
16	Czarni Jaworze	30	3	4	23	32–95	−63	13	Relegated to Klasa A	

=== 2015–16 season ===
Changes in team composition:

- Relegated from IV liga 2014–15: Góral 1956 Żywiec (Śląska II group).
- Promoted from A-class 2014–15: Soła Kobiernice (Bielsko-Biała group champion), Spójnia Zebrzydowice (Skoczów group champion), and LKS Leśna (Żywiec group champion).

Pos	Team	M	W	D	L	GF/GA	GD	Pts	Notes	H2H
1	Beskid Skoczów	30	17	11	2	67–27	+40	62	Promoted to IV liga	SKO – PAS 2:1; PAS – SKO 1:3
2	Pasjonat Dankowice	30	18	7	5	83–46	+37	61		SKO – PAS 2:1; PAS – SKO 1:3
3	WSS Wisła	30	17	4	9	91–43	+48	55		
4	Góral 1956 Żywiec	30	15	8	7	53–38	+15	53		
5	MRKS Czechowice-Dziedzice	30	14	8	8	58–46	+12	50		
6	Kuźnia Ustroń	30	12	13	5	47–28	+19	49		
7	Koszarawa Żywiec	30	12	8	10	43–40	+3	44		
8	LKS Bestwina	30	14	3	13	44–39	+5	45		
9	LKS 99 Pruchna	30	11	7	12	48–46	+2	40		
10	Cukrownik Chybie	30	10	9	11	54–57	−3	39		
11	Świt Cięcina	30	11	2	17	37–62	−25	35	Relegated, team disbanded	
12	Skałka Żabnica	30	8	10	12	45–47	−2	34		ŻAB – SPZ 2:1; SPZ – ŻAB 0:3
13	Spójnia Zebrzydowice	30	10	4	16	53–73	−20	34		ŻAB – SPZ 2:1; SPZ – ŻAB 0:3
14	LKS Leśna	30	6	8	16	37–57	−20	26		
15	Maksymilian Cisiec	30	5	5	20	39–89	−50	20	Remained in league	
16	Soła Kobiernice	30	2	7	21	33–94	−61	13	Relegated to Klasa A	

=== 2016–17 season ===
Changes in team composition: Promoted from A-class 2015–16: GLKS Wilkowice (Bielsko-Biała group champion), Błyskawica Drogomyśl (Skoczów group champion), and Bory Pietrzykowice (Żywiec group champion).

Pos	Team	M	W	D	L	GF/GA	GD	Pts	Notes	H2H
1	Kuźnia Ustroń	30	25	3	2	96–18	+78	78	Promoted to IV liga	
2	WSS Wisła	30	23	4	3	107–34	+73	73		
3	MRKS Czechowice-Dziedzice	30	17	5	8	69–36	+33	56		MRK – GÓR 3:1; GÓR – MRK 1:5
4	Góral 1956 Żywiec	30	17	5	8	71–35	+36	56		MRK – GÓR 3:1; GÓR – MRK 1:5
5	LKS Bestwina	30	15	10	5	49–29	+20	55		
6	Skałka Żabnica	30	14	4	12	69–75	−6	46		
7	Pasjonat Dankowice	30	13	5	12	60–63	−3	44		
8	Cukrownik Chybie	30	13	4	13	63–56	+7	43		
9	Błyskawica Drogomyśl	30	11	7	12	55–61	−6	40		BŁY – KOŻ 2:2; KOŻ – BŁY 0:1
10	Koszarawa Żywiec	30	11	7	12	50–45	+5	40		BŁY – KOŻ 2:2; KOŻ – BŁY 0:1
11	GLKS Wilkowice	30	11	3	16	40–62	−22	36		
12	LKS 99 Pruchna	30	8	9	13	35–58	−23	33		
13	LKS Leśna	30	6	6	18	31–78	−47	24		
14	Spójnia Zebrzydowice	30	6	4	20	37–71	−34	22		
15	Bory Pietrzykowice	30	5	6	19	28–61	−33	21	Relegated to Klasa A	
16	Maksymilian Cisiec	30	1	6	23	25–103	−78	9	Relegated to Klasa A	

=== 2017–18 season ===
Changes in team composition: Promoted from A-class 2016–17: Czarni Jaworze (Bielsko-Biała group champion), Tempo Puńców (Skoczów group champion), and Orzeł Łękawica (Żywiec group champion).

Pos	Team	M	W	D	L	GF/GA	GD	Pts	Notes	H2H
1	MRKS Czechowice-Dziedzice	30	26	3	1	120–26	+94	81	Promoted to IV liga	
2	LKS Bestwina	30	18	6	6	60–31	+29	60		
3	Błyskawica Drogomyśl	30	18	3	9	67–55	+12	57		BŁY – WSS 1:2; WSS – BŁY 3:4
4	WSS Wisła	30	18	3	9	75–47	+28	57		BŁY – WSS 1:2; WSS – BŁY 3:4
5	Koszarawa Żywiec	30	15	8	7	46–25	+21	53		
6	Tempo Puńców	30	16	2	12	71–47	+24	50		
7	Pasjonat Dankowice	30	15	4	11	79–63	+16	49		
8	Cukrownik Chybie	30	13	7	10	59–46	+13	46		
9	Czarni Jaworze	30	12	6	12	68–67	+1	42		
10	Góral 1956 Żywiec	30	11	7	12	51–40	+11	40		GÓR – ŁĘK 2:1; ŁĘK – GÓR 3:2
11	Orzeł Łękawica	30	12	4	14	61–63	−2	40		GÓR – ŁĘK 2:1; ŁĘK – GÓR 3:2
12	Spójnia Zebrzydowice	30	10	4	16	52–80	−28	34		
13	LKS 99 Pruchna	30	6	11	13	42–61	−19	29	Remained in league	
14	Skałka Żabnica	30	7	3	20	53–97	−44	24	Relegated to Klasa A	
15	LKS Leśna	30	4	2	24	30–105	−75	14	Relegated to Klasa A	
16	GLKS Wilkowice	30	1	3	26	20–101	−81	6	Relegated to Klasa A	

=== 2018–19 season ===
Changes in team composition:

- Relegated from III liga 2017–18: BKS Stal Bielsko-Biała (group III).
- Promoted from A-class 2017–18: Rekord II Bielsko-Biała and KS Bestwinka (Bielsko-Biała group champion and runner-up), LKS Kończyce Małe (Skoczów group champion), and Soła Rajcza (Żywiec group champion).

BKS Stal Bielsko-Biała withdrew from the 2018–19 III liga, resulting in relegation by two divisions. Consequently, the league was expanded to 17 teams. In September 2018, the league was further expanded to 18 teams by including Rekord II Bielsko-Biała, following the reversal of a walkover decision from the previous Bielsko-Biała A-class season, restoring Rekord II's championship title while KS Bestwinka remained in the league.

Pos	Team	M	W	D	L	GF/GA	GD	Pts	Notes	H2H
1	Beskid Skoczów	34	26	5	3	103–24	+79	83	Promoted to IV liga	
2	Błyskawica Drogomyśl	34	24	6	4	89–31	+58	78	Transferred to group VI	
3	BKS Stal Bielsko-Biała	34	22	5	7	82–46	+36	71	Transferred to group V	
4	Pasjonat Dankowice	34	20	6	8	79–51	+28	66	Transferred to group V	PAS – BST 3:0; BST – PAS 3:2
5	LKS Bestwina	34	19	9	6	71–40	+31	66	Transferred to group V	PAS – BST 3:0; BST – PAS 3:2
6	Rekord II Bielsko-Biała	34	16	5	13	78–64	+14	53	Transferred to group V	
7	Tempo Puńców	34	15	5	14	67–60	+7	50	Transferred to group VI	TEM: 7 pts; GÓR: 5 pts; KOŻ: 4 pts
8	Góral 1956 Żywiec	34	14	8	12	49–37	+12	50	Transferred to group VI	TEM: 7 pts; GÓR: 5 pts; KOŻ: 4 pts
9	Koszarawa Żywiec	34	12	14	8	54–40	+14	50	Transferred to group VI	TEM: 7 pts; GÓR: 5 pts; KOŻ: 4 pts
10	WSS Wisła	34	10	12	12	60–64	−4	42	Transferred to group VI	WSS: 7 pts; SOR: 6 pts; CZJ: 4 pts
11	Soła Rajcza	34	12	6	16	56–66	−10	42	Transferred to group VI	WSS: 7 pts; SOR: 6 pts; CZJ: 4 pts
12	Czarni Jaworze	34	11	9	14	61–53	+8	42	Transferred to group V	WSS: 7 pts; SOR: 6 pts; CZJ: 4 pts
13	KS Bestwinka	34	11	5	18	39–69	−30	38	Transferred to group V	
14	Orzeł Łękawica	34	10	6	18	60–91	−31	36	Transferred to group VI	
15	Cukrownik Chybie	34	9	6	19	53–79	−26	33	Transferred to group VI	
16	Spójnia Zebrzydowice	34	7	5	22	40–82	−42	26	Transferred to group VI	
17	LKS 99 Pruchna	34	7	4	23	45–99	−54	25	Transferred to group VI	
18	LKS Kończyce Małe	34	2	2	30	35–125	−90	8	Relegated to Klasa A	

== Bibliography ==
- Bieniecki, Paweł (2009). BBTS 1907 TS Podbeskidzie 2008 (in Polish). Bielsko-Biała: Arial.
