= Ireneusz Jeleń =

Polish footballer (born 1981)

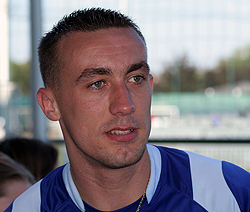

Personal information
- Full name: Ireneusz Jeleń
- Date of birth: 9 April 1981 (age 45)
- Place of birth: Cieszyn, Poland
- Height: 1.84 m (6 ft 0 in)
- Positions: Right winger; striker

Team information
- Current team: CKS Piast Cieszyn
- Number: 10

Youth career
- Piast Cieszyn

Senior career*
Years	Team	Apps	(Gls)
2000	Piast Cieszyn	16	(8)
2001–2002	Beskid Skoczów	40	(22)
2002–2006	Wisła Płock	100	(45)
2006–2011	Auxerre	140	(48)
2011–2012	Lille	13	(1)
2012	Podbeskidzie Bielsko-Biała	7	(0)
2013	Górnik Zabrze	12	(2)
2014	Piast Cieszyn	4	(6)
2019–	CKS Piast Cieszyn	163	(179)

International career
2003–2012	Poland	29	(5)
- * Club domestic league appearances and goals as of 18:07, 30 June 2026 (UTC)

Ireneusz Jeleń (Polish pronunciation: [irɛˈnɛuʂ ˈjɛlɛɲ]; born 9 April 1981) is a Polish footballer who plays as a right-winger or striker for CKS Piast Cieszyn.

== Club career ==
Jeleń was born in Cieszyn. From 2002 to 2006, he played for Ekstraklasa side Wisła Płock. In four seasons, he scored 45 goals in 100 appearances in the Polish top league.

On 28 June 2006, Jeleń moved to French Ligue 1 club Auxerre. On 9 September 2006, Jeleń scored his first league goal for Auxerre against Monaco. On 20 October 2007, he grabbed his first hat-trick, after coming off the bench in the 71st minute against Lorient. In his first couple of seasons at Auxerre, Jeleń was plagued with recurring back problems. In October 2008, he suffered a broken collarbone. He returned to action in late January 2009. Auxerre's manager Jean Fernandez has described Jeleń as the player in his squad having the most ability in front of goal. Prior to his return, Auxerre was in 17th place, barely above the relegation zone. Upon his return, Jeleń scored 11 goals in 16 league matches, with Auxerre advancing to 8th in the table. Despite missing part of the season, Jelen tied for 4th in the Ligue 1 goalscoring charts. In May 2009, he was voted Auxerre's Player of the Season, garnering 79% of the votes. In July 2009, France Football ranked him 4th among strikers and 15th overall among footballers playing in Ligue 1.

In December 2009, he was voted Polish Player of the Year.

During the 2009–10 season, he helped Auxerre to finish third in the league and win a place in the 2010–11 UEFA Champions League Play-off round. He finished fifth in the Ligue 1 goalscoring charts with 14 goals, despite missing some matches due to injury. Auxerre lost only once with Jeleń in the line up, 0–5 at Grenoble on 6 February 2010.

Jeleń signed a contract as a free agent with Lille at the end of August, after his contract with Auxerre expired.

After refusing to move to Stade Brest, he was soon left without a club. He returned to Poland and signed for Ekstraklasa side Podbeskidzie Bielsko-Biała but after a poor half of the season he was released. After a short stint at Górnik Zabrze, where he left due to his father's illness he finished his career at the local club he started his career with, Piast Cieszyn, before eventually retiring in 2014.

Since 2019, Jeleń has been playing for CKS Piast Cieszyn at amateur level, where he also serves as the club's chairman.

== International career ==
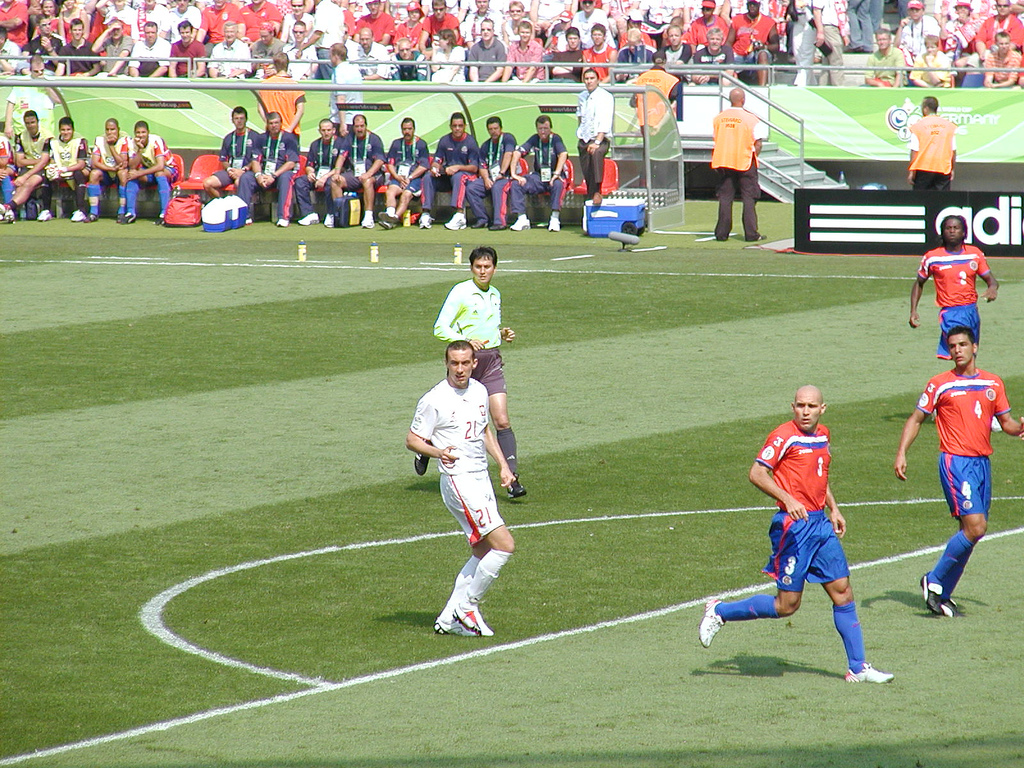
Ireneusz Jeleń during the 2006 FIFA World Cup game against Costa Rica

As of October 2011, Jeleń has 28 caps with the Polish national team. He was selected for the 23-man squad that took part in the 2006 FIFA World Cup finals in Germany and played in all three of the Group A games, almost scoring with an impressive left foot shot that hit the crossbar against Ecuador in their 2–0 defeat. His trademarks are speed and acceleration. Jelen failed to make Poland's squad for their upcoming Euro 2012 campaign, however he was placed on standby.

== Personal life ==
Jeleń was born the middle of three children, having an older sister and a younger brother. He and his wife, Anna, have a son, Jakub, born in 2003, and a daughter, Julia, born in January 2010.

== Career statistics ==
=== Club ===
As of match played 13 June 2026

Appearances and goals by club, season and competition
Club	Season	League			National cup (Note: Includes Polish Cup, Coupe de France)		Europe		Total	
Club	Season	Division	Apps	Goals	Apps	Goals	Apps	Goals	Apps	Goals
Piast Cieszyn	2000–01	IV liga	16	8	—		—		16	8
Beskid Skoczów	2000–01	IV liga	11	6	—		—		11	6
Beskid Skoczów	2001–02	IV liga	29	16	—		—		29	16
Beskid Skoczów	Total		40	22	—		—		40	22
Wisła Płock	2002–03	Ekstraklasa	26	8	9	4	—		35	12
Wisła Płock	2003–04	Ekstraklasa	26	18	1	0	2 (Note: Appearances in UEFA Cup)	2	29	20
Wisła Płock	2004–05	Ekstraklasa	23	12	3	2	—		26	14
Wisła Płock	2005–06	Ekstraklasa	25	7	9	5	2	0	36	12
Wisła Płock	Total		100	45	22	11	4	2	126	58
AJ Auxerre	2006–07	Ligue 1	32	10	2	0	8 (Note: Seven appearances and one goal in UEFA Cup, one appearance in UEFA Intertoto Cup)	5	42	15
AJ Auxerre	2007–08	Ligue 1	32	5	4	1	—		36	6
AJ Auxerre	2008–09	Ligue 1	26	14	1	0	—		27	14
AJ Auxerre	2009–10	Ligue 1	29	14	3	4	—		32	18
AJ Auxerre	2010–11	Ligue 1	21	5	0	0	4 (Note: Appearances in UEFA Champions League)	1	25	6
AJ Auxerre	Total		140	48	10	5	12	6	162	59
Lille OSC	2011–12	Ligue 1	13	1	4	3	2	0	19	4
Podbeskidzie	2012–13	Ekstraklasa	7	0	0	0	—		7	0
Górnik Zabrze	2012–13	Ekstraklasa	12	2	0	0	—		12	2
Piast Cieszyn	2013–14	Klasa A Skoczów	4	6	—		—		4	6
CKS Piast Cieszyn	2019–20	Klasa B Skoczów	6	13	—		—		6	13
CKS Piast Cieszyn	2020–21	Klasa A Skoczów	25	47	—		—		25	47
CKS Piast Cieszyn	2021–22	Reg. league Silesia VI	30	32	—		—		30	32
CKS Piast Cieszyn	2022–23	Reg. league Silesia VI	20	14	—		—		20	14
CKS Piast Cieszyn	2023–24	Reg. league Silesia VI	30	26	—		—		30	26
CKS Piast Cieszyn	2024–25	Reg. league Silesia VI	26	32	—		—		26	32
CKS Piast Cieszyn	2025–26	Reg. league Silesia VI	26	15	—		—		26	15
CKS Piast Cieszyn	Total		163	179	—		—		163	179
Career total			495	311	36	19	18	8	549	338

=== International ===
Appearances and goals by national team and year
National team	Year	Apps	Goals
Poland
Poland	2003	2	1
Poland	2004	2	0
Poland	2005	1	0
Poland	2006	10	1
Poland	2007	3	0
Poland	2008	1	0
Poland	2009	5	2
Poland	2010	3	1
Poland	2011	1	0
Poland	2012	1	0
Total		29	5

Scores and results list Poland's goal tally first, score column indicates score after each Jeleń goal.

List of international goals scored by Ireneusz Jeleń
No.	Date	Venue	Opponent	Score	Result	Competition
1	14 December 2003	National Stadium, Ta' Qali, Ta' Qali, Malta	Lithuania	3–1	3–1	Friendly
2	30 May 2006	Silesian Stadium, Chorzów, Poland	Colombia	1–2	1–2	Friendly
3	28 March 2009	Windsor Park, Belfast, Northern Ireland	Northern Ireland	1–1	2–3	2010 FIFA World Cup qualification
4	1 April 2009	Stadion Miejski, Kielce, Poland	San Marino	5–0	10–0	2010 FIFA World Cup qualification
5	4 September 2010	Widzew Łódź Stadium, Łódź, Poland	Ukraine	1–0	1–1	Friendly

== Honours ==
Beskid Skoczów

- Polish Cup (Skoczów regionals): 2001–02

Wisła Płock

- Polish Cup: 2005–06; runner-up: 2002–03

CKS Piast Cieszyn

- Klasa A Skoczów: 2020–21
- Klasa B Skoczów: 2019–20
