= Lisandro López =

Lisandro López may refer to:

- Lisandro López (footballer, born 1983), Argentine footballer
- Lisandro López (footballer, born 1989), Argentine footballer
