= Marie Blachère =

French bakery and restaurant chain

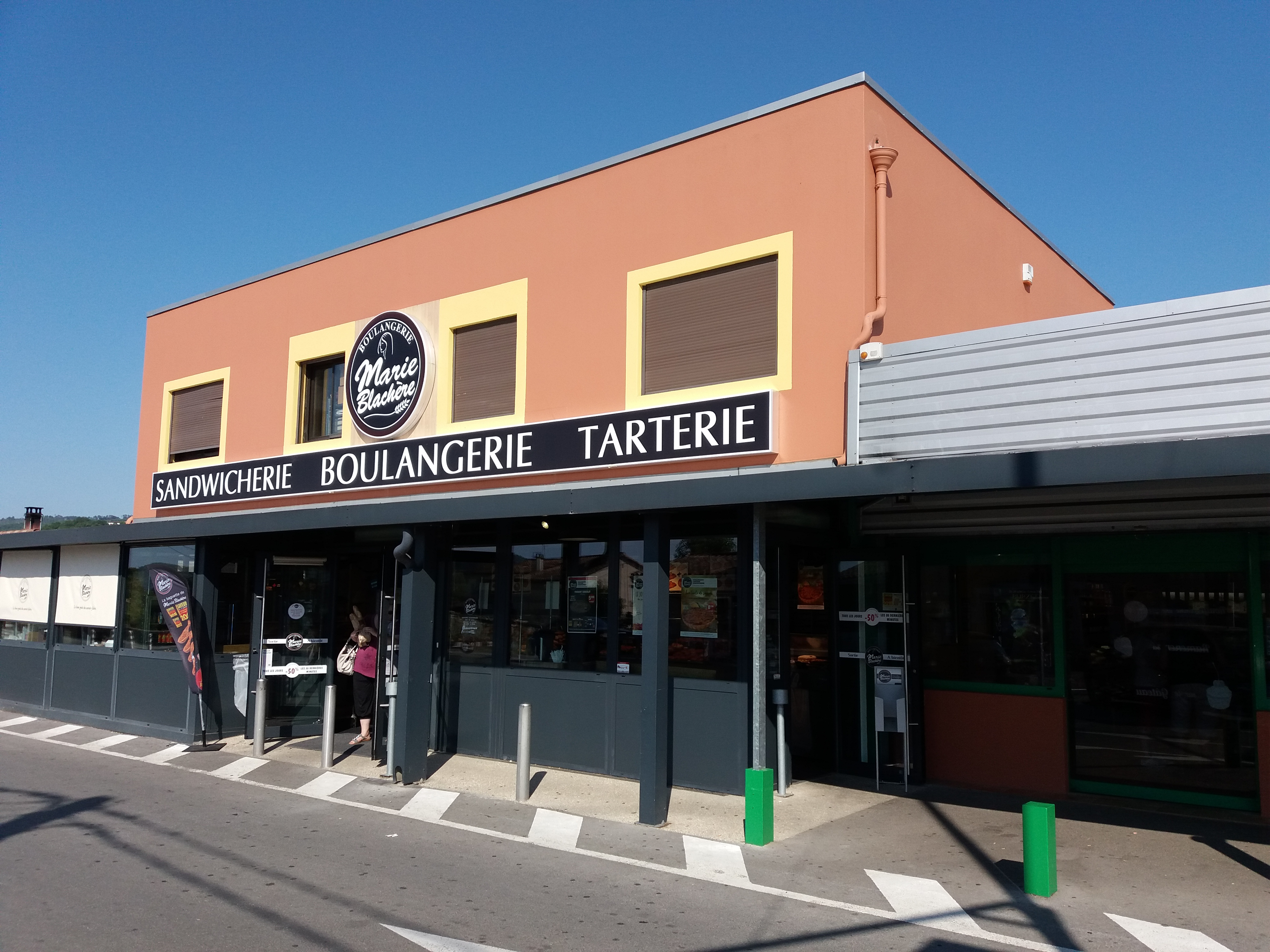

Boulangerie Marie Blachère is a French bakery and restaurant chain. As of 2022, it is the third-largest restaurant chain in France after McDonald's and Burger King.

The chain was founded in 2004 by Bernard Blachère, a market gardener from Ardèche, and named after his daughter Marie. His concept was to create a chain of very large (400 m^{2}) stores that sell baked goods and fast food. The chain's distinguishing feature is that all bread is made by hand on site rather than industrially.

As of 2022, the chain employs 11,000 people and has a revenue of a billion euros. It sells 280 million baguettes annually at a price of 74 cents. It operates 700 stores (as well as seven franchised stores) in all of France except Paris, where the company said rents are too high to allow the chain to implement its policy of selling its bread at the same price nationwide. The founder, Bernard Blachère, retains 91% of the stock.
