= Piast Cieszyn =

Polish sports club

- Founded: 1909; 117 years ago
- Dissolved: 2016; 10 years ago
- Ground: Municipal Stadium
- Capacity: 4,000

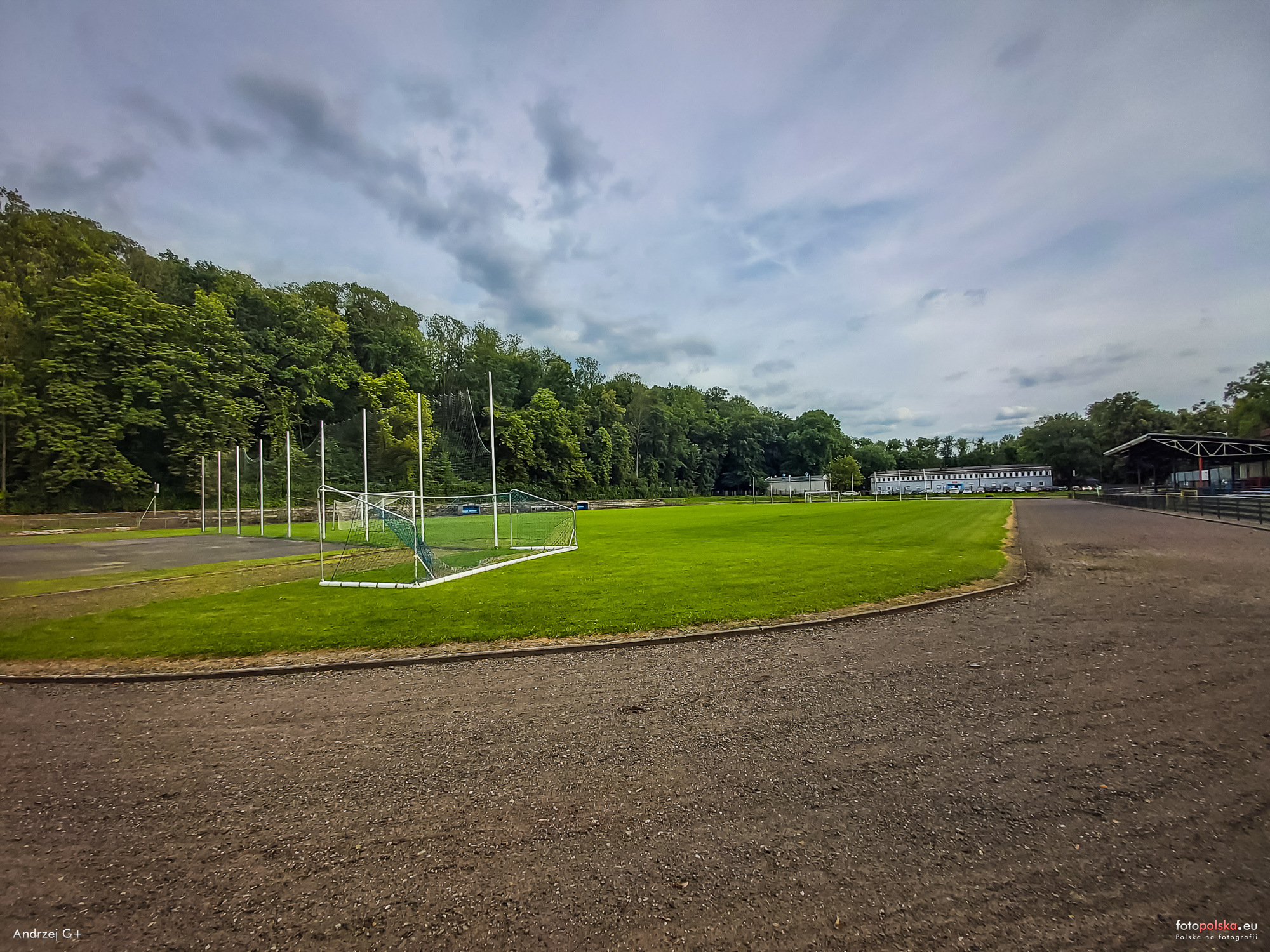
Municipal Stadium in Cieszyn

Piast Cieszyn was a Polish sports club, founded in 1909 in Cieszyn. In the past, the club was known as Stal Cieszyn. Piast matches were played at the Municipal Stadium at ul. Jana Łyska 21 in Cieszyn.

Ireneusz Jeleń, Piast's famous home-grown player, started his football career here.

In 2016, the original Piast Cieszyn was disestablished and split into three different entities: TS Piast Cieszyn, TS 1909 Piast Cieszyn and CKS Piast Cieszyn, the latter led by Jeleń.

TS Piast Cieszyn was dissolved in 2018, followed by TS 1909 Piast two years later. CKS Piast, as of the 2024–25 season, competes in the Skoczów-Żywiec regional league.

== Honours ==
- III league - 1959, 1959-1960
- 1/16 of the Polish Cup final - 1964–65
- 1st round of the Polish Cup - 1984–85
- The OZPN Polish Cup in Bielsko-Biała - 1983–84
