= Elior Group =

French food service company

- Type: Public company
- Traded as: CAC Mid 60
- Industry: Contract catering and business services
- Founded: 1991; 35 years ago
- Headquarters: France
- Key people: Daniel Derichebourg; Boris Derichebourg
- Revenue: €6.15 billion (2024)
- Net income: €88 million (2025)
- Owner: Daniel Derichebourg (48.17%)
- Number of employees: 133,000 (2024)
- Subsidiaries: Elior; Derichebourg Multiservices
- Website: eliorgroup.com

Elior Group is a multinational company that specializes in catering and food service. Based in France, Elior provides meal services to a variety of sectors including education, healthcare, business, and the travel sector, among others. The company operates primarily in Europe and the United States, offering both onsite dining and meal delivery services. They are also involved in facility management services through subsidiary companies.

== History ==
=== Company origin ===
The group was founded in 1991 by Robert Zolade and Francis Markus, who along with 300 associated executives took a 35% stake in their employer, Générale de Restauration, a subsidiary of the Accor group specializing in contract catering. The group expanded its activities in the United Kingdom, Spain, Italy, and France through acquisitions and partnerships. In 1998, the group adopted the name Elior and, in France, organized around two activities: contract catering with Avenance and concession catering with Eliance.

=== Growth by acquisition ===
In 2000 Elior was listed on the primary market of Euronext in Paris. From 2001 to 2006, the company's international growth was marked by alliances with Serunion and Areas in Spain, making it a regional leader in contract catering. This expansion continued with acquisitions in Italy, France, and the United Kingdom.

In 2006 Robert Zolade and two partner investors acquired 100% of Elior's capital and voting rights, delisting the company from the stock exchange. Despite this, Elior continued to develop in Europe and expanded its activities in the United States, particularly in the airport and highway markets. The acquisitions of FMC, GHS, and Sin & Stes strengthened its multiservice offerings.

By 2011 Elior consolidated its activities under a single brand, phasing out Eliance and Avenance. It established three main divisions: Elior Concession (for city, airport, highway, train station, and leisure concessions), Elior Restauration (contract catering for businesses, education, and healthcare), and Elior Service (cleaning and facilities management). The following year, Elior acquired Ansamble and bolstered its position in Italy.

In 2013 Elior entered the American contract catering market by acquiring TrustHouse Services, the fourth largest operator in the education and healthcare markets in the United States. Elior returned to the stock market in June 2014, listing on Euronext Paris, and joined the SBF 120 index in March 2015. In July 2015, Elior became the sole shareholder of Areas and further strengthened its U.S. presence in contract catering by acquiring Starr Catering Group and Abl Management, specializing in catering for correctional and university facilities.

March 2016 saw the renaming of Elior's North American subsidiary to Elior North America, and the acquisition of Preferred Meals, a company specializing in contract catering and home delivery for the education and senior markets. In July 2016, Elior Group announced the acquisition of Waterfall Catering Group through its subsidiary Elior UK, reinforcing its positions in the education, healthcare, social services, and corporate markets.

In November 2016 Elior Group entered the Indian market with the acquisition of MegaBite Food Services and CRCL. The expansion continued in 2017 with the acquisitions of CBM Managed Services, Lancer Hospitality, Abigail Kirsch, Corporate Chefs, Design Cuisine, and Sidekim in the United States.

On July 26, 2017, the board of directors decided to change the company's governance structure, separating the roles of chairman and CEO. In July 2018, Elior Group acquired Bateman Community Living, an American company specializing in senior nutrition.

In April 2019 Elior Group announced it had received a firm offer of €1,542 million from PAI Partners for its catering activities under the Areas brand. The transaction, totaling approximately €1.4 billion net, was finalized on July 1, 2019.

=== Burdened by debt and affected by the covid crisis ===
Heavily impacted by the COVID-19 pandemic, Elior announced the elimination of 1,888 positions in France within its corporate catering business in October 2020. In November 2021, Elior reported continued losses, with a net loss of 100 million euros for the 2020–2021 period. This was nevertheless an improvement over 2019–2020 results, which had ended with a loss of 483 million euros.

=== Arrival of Derichebourg ===
In May 2022 Derichebourg Group became the largest shareholder of Elior Group, increasing its stake to 20% of the company's capital. By December, Derichebourg further increased its stake in Elior to 48.4%, up from 24.63% before this transaction. This increase in participation was made in exchange for the acquisition of Derichebourg's service business, which employed 37,000 people and generated nearly 950 million euros in revenue.

On March 6, 2023, the signing of the memorandum of understanding and the agreement regarding the sale of Derichebourg Multiservices to Elior was made official. This transaction was approved at the general meeting on April 18, 2023, creating a combined entity with over 5 billion euros in revenue and 134,000 employees.

== Activities and subsidiaries ==
Elior Group focuses on two major activities:

- Contract catering
- Business services

Catering activities are organized by country: Elior France, Elior North America, Elior UK, Elior Italia, and Serunion. Service activities are conducted by Derichebourg Multiservices and Elior Services.

== Management ==
At the end of February 2022 Philippe Guillemot's contract renewal was approved by 98% of the board of directors. However, the following day, he announced his immediate departure from Elior Group for personal reasons. While searching for his successor, the board appointed Bernard Gault as interim CEO, who was confirmed in the position a few months later.

Daniel Derichebourg, who remains chairman of the board of directors of Derichebourg Group, is now the chairman and CEO of Elior Group following the general meeting on April 18, 2023. Boris Derichebourg has been appointed Chief Operating Officer.

== Shareholders ==
As of April 18, 2023, the capital of Elior is as follows:

Derichebourg	48.3%
BDL Capital Management	5.5%
Flottant	46.2%

Following the acquisition of Derichebourg Group's multiservices branch, Derichebourg's stake in Elior's capital is now 48.3%.

== Lobbying ==
=== With the European Union ===
Elior Group is represented by FoodServiceEurope, which has been registered since 2008 in the Transparency Register of interest representatives with the European Commission. In 2018, FoodServiceEurope declared annual expenses for this activity amounting to between 200,000 and 300,000 euros.

=== In France ===
Elior Group declared to the High Authority for Transparency in Public Life that it engaged in lobbying activities in France for an amount not exceeding 10,000 euros in 2019.

== Controversies ==
=== Disputed working conditions ===
In 2008 181 employees, believing they were not receiving fair working conditions, particularly compared to other employees in the group, filed a lawsuit against Elior. The labor court ruled in their favor in 2012, as did the Court of Appeal in 2016. However, in 2018, the Court of Cassation overturned the two previous rulings due to general changes in labor legislation regarding collective bargaining and jurisprudence. As a result, the employees were required to repay the amounts they had previously received. Elior Group, which intends to enforce the decision, stated that it plans to "adapt on a case-by-case basis."

In April 2019 the housekeepers at NH Collection in Marseille went on strike, as the hotel outsourced its cleaning services to Elior Service. They demanded an increase in the gross hourly wage from 10.28 euros to 10.51 euros, a 50% premium for Sunday hours instead of the current 20%, a 13th month salary, and the regularization of unpaid hours.
