= Derichebourg =

French service company

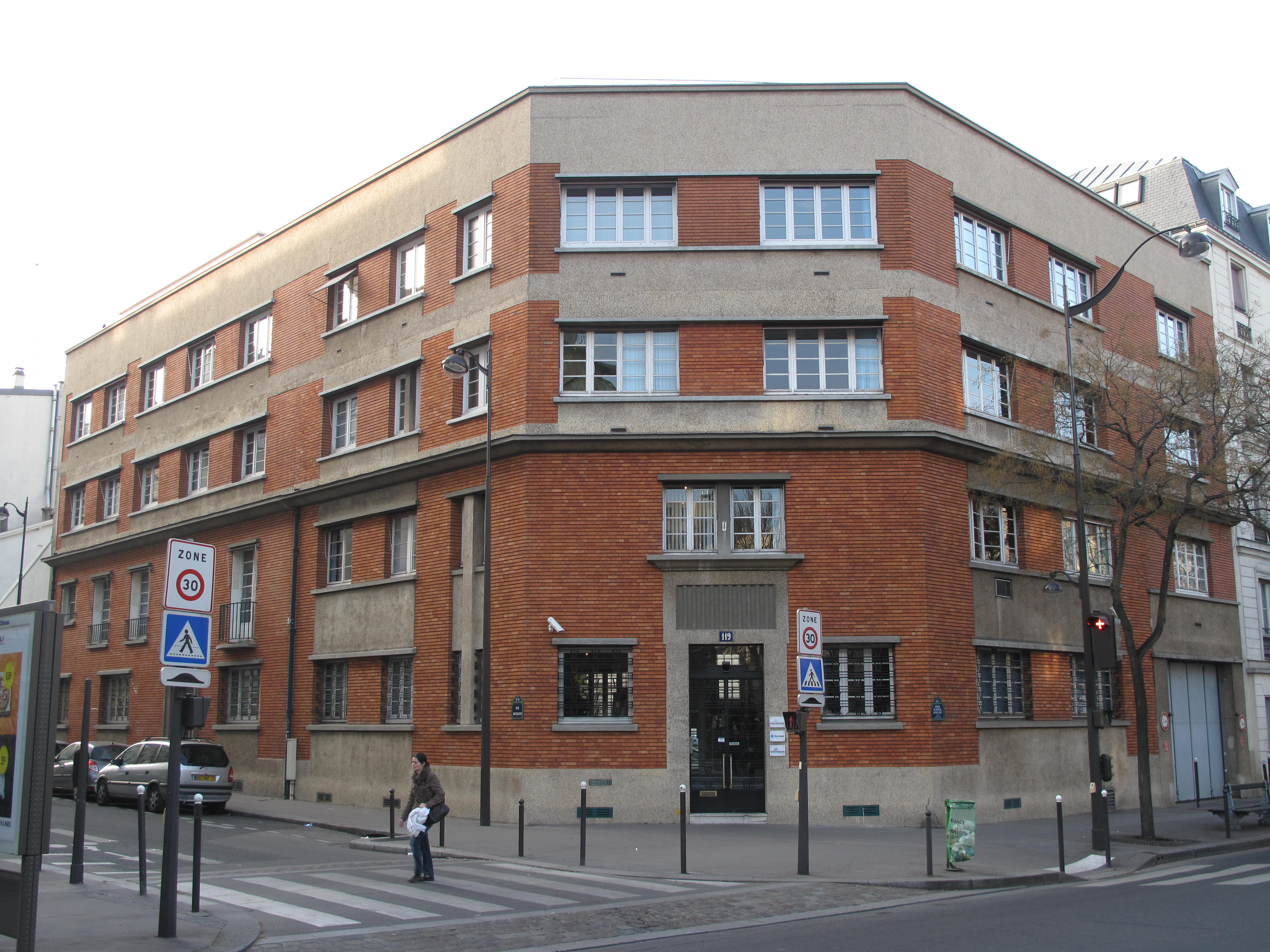
- Derichebourg headquarters in Paris
- Traded as: Euronext Paris: DBG; CAC Mid 60 component
- Founded: 2007
- Founder: Daniel Derichebourg
- Headquarters: Paris, 117 Avenue du Général Michel Bizot, France
- Services: Aircraft ground handling Recycling
- Revenue: 2,7 Billion €
- Number of employees: 36500
- Divisions: Derichebourg Environnement, Derichebourg Multiservices
- Website: www.derichebourg.com

Derichebourg is a French global operator at the international level in environmental services to businesses and local and municipal authorities in 10 countries on 3 continents. Its activities can be divided into two separate branches: the Environment division and the Multiservices division.

Its head office is in the 12th arrondissement of Paris.

== Overview of businesses ==
The Derichebourg Group is a player at the international level in the provision of services to businesses and to local and municipal authorities. Derichebourg covers the entire waste recycling chain, from collection to recovery, as well as a full range of Business Services and Public Sector Services, including cleaning, temporary work, energy and outsourced aeronautical services.

The Environmental Services’ core business is the processing and disposal of waste – mainly metal waste – and of end-of-life products, with recovery of secondary raw materials by using appropriate processing methods. Environmental Services have become a cornerstone in the international environmental protection policy. The Environmental Services and Multiservices divisions are subject to different economic cycles.

The Group’s historic business is the recycling of scrap metal. This activity is somewhat cyclical in nature and depends on the performance of the steel and metallurgy industries. In the mid-2000s, the desire to add a more resilient business to recycling led to the acquisition of Multiservices/Facilities activities. Today, the Derichebourg Group has two subsidiaries: Derichebourg Environnement and Derichebourg Multiservices.

Daniel Derichebourg is the founder and current CEO of Derichebourg Group.

== Subsidiaries ==
=== Derichebourg Environnement ===
- Recycling in France: Revival, Eska, Purfer, AFM, Inorec, Refinal, CashMetal, Fricom, Valme, Corepa
- Recycling in Belgium: George
- Recycling in Mexico: Derichebourg Recycling Mexico
- Recycling in the United States of America: Derichebourg Recycling USA
- Recycling in Germany: Derichebourg Umwelt
- Recycling in Spain: Derichebourg España, Derichebourg Medio Ambiente
- Waste Management in France: Polyurbaine, Derichebourg Environnement
- Waste Management in Canada: Derichebourg Canada

=== Derichebourg Multiservices ===
- Derichebourg Aeronautics Services (France, USA, UK, China, Spain, Germany)
- Derichebourg Logistique & Manutention (France)
- Derichebourg Propreté et Services associés (France)
- Derichebourg Technologies (France)
- Derichebourg FM (Facility Management - France)
- Derichebourg Accueil (France)
- Derichebourg Energie (France)
- Derichebourg Energie E.P. (France)
- Derichebourg V.R.D. Espaces Verts (France)
- Derichebourg SNG (France)
- Derichebourg Intérim et Recrutement (France)
- Derichebourg Aeronautics Recruitment (France, Spain, Germany)
- Derichebourg Aeronautics Training (France)
- Derichebourg Facility Services (Portugal, Spain)

Boris Derichebourg is the current CEO of Derichebourg Multiservices.
