= 2004 UEFA European Under-17 Championship squads =

Football tournament squads

Those marked in bold have now been capped at full international level.

== Group A ==
=== France ===
Head coach: Philippe Bergeroo

No.	Pos.	Player	Date of birth (age)	Caps	Club
1	GK	**Benoît Costil**	30 July 1987 (aged 16)		(France) Caen
2	DF	Maxime Josse	21 March 1987 (aged 17)		(France) Sochaux
3	DF	Thomas Mangani	29 April 1987 (aged 17)		(France) Monaco
4	DF	**Karim El Mourabet**	30 April 1987 (aged 17)		(France) Nantes
5	DF	Steven Thicot	14 February 1987 (aged 17)		(France) Nantes
6	MF	Pierre Ducasse	7 May 1987 (aged 16)		(France) Bordeaux
7	MF	**Franck Songo'o**	14 May 1987 (aged 16)		(Spain) Barcelona
8	MF	Ahmed Yahiaoui	12 January 1987 (aged 17)		(France) Marseille
9	FW	**Jérémy Ménez**	7 May 1987 (aged 16)		(France) Sochaux
10	MF	**Samir Nasri**	26 June 1987 (aged 16)		(France) Marseille
11	MF	**Hatem Ben Arfa**	7 March 1987 (aged 17)		(France) Lyon
12	DF	**Serge Akakpo**	15 October 1987 (aged 16)		(France) Auxerre
13	MF	Irélé Apo	16 January 1987 (aged 17)		(France) Auxerre
14	MF	**Kévin Constant**	15 May 1987 (aged 16)		(France) Toulouse
15	MF	Stéphane Marseille	15 April 1987 (aged 17)		(France) Stade Reims
16	GK	Rémy Riou	6 August 1987 (aged 16)		(France) Lyon
17	DF	Jean-Christophe Cesto	24 January 1987 (aged 17)		(France) Nantes
18	FW	**Karim Benzema**	19 December 1987 (aged 16)		(France) Lyon

=== Northern Ireland ===
Head coach: Kenny Shiels

No.	Pos.	Player	Date of birth (age)	Caps	Club
1	GK	**Jonathan Tuffey**	20 January 1987 (aged 17)		(England) Coventry City
2	MF	Chris Turner	3 January 1987 (aged 17)		(England) Derby County
3	DF	David Armstrong	23 January 1987 (aged 17)		(Northern Ireland) Lisburn Distillery
4	DF	Jason Ferry	18 April 1987 (aged 17)		
5	DF	Jonathan Watterson	9 January 1987 (aged 17)		
6		Gerard McCabe	5 December 1987 (aged 16)		
7		Darren Nash	4 June 1987 (aged 16)		
8		Matthew Doherty	11 January 1987 (aged 17)		
9		Dominic Melly	19 July 1987 (aged 16)		
10	MF	**Michael O'Connor**	6 October 1987 (aged 16)		(England) Crewe Alexandra
11	MF	Daryl Fordyce	2 January 1987 (aged 17)		(England) Portsmouth
12	GK	Trevor Carson	5 March 1988 (aged 16)		(England) Sunderland
13		Ryan Catney	9 March 1987 (aged 17)		
14		Jonathan Montgomery	22 September 1987 (aged 16)		
15		Andrew Rosbotham	5 February 1987 (aged 17)		
16	FW	**Kyle Lafferty**	16 September 1987 (aged 16)		(England) Burnley
17		Paul McCrink	14 January 1987 (aged 17)		
18		Michael Carville	8 October 1987 (aged 16)		

=== Spain ===
Head coach: Juan Santisteban

No.	Pos.	Player	Date of birth (age)	Caps	Club
1	GK	Antonio Adán	13 May 1987 (aged 16)		(Spain) Real Madrid
2	FW	Cristian del Moral	3 March 1987 (aged 17)		(Spain) Valencia
3	DF	Pepe Plá	25 January 1987 (aged 17)		(Spain) Valencia
4	DF	David Lombán	5 June 1987 (aged 16)		(Spain) Valencia
5	DF	**Gerard Piqué**	2 February 1987 (aged 17)		(Spain) Barcelona
6	MF	**Mario Suárez**	24 February 1987 (aged 17)		(Spain) Atlético Madrid
7	MF	Carlos Carmona	5 July 1987 (aged 16)		(Spain) RCD Mallorca
8	MF	**Cesc Fàbregas**	4 May 1987 (aged 17)		(England) Arsenal
9	FW	César Díaz	5 January 1987 (aged 17)		(Spain) Albacete
10	MF	**Javi García**	8 February 1987 (aged 17)		(Spain) Real Madrid
11	MF	Marquitos	21 March 1987 (aged 17)		(Spain) Villarreal
12	MF	**Diego Capel**	16 February 1988 (aged 16)		(Spain) Sevilla
13	GK	Javier Mandaluniz	15 January 1987 (aged 17)		(Spain) Athletic Bilbao
14	FW	Marc Pedraza	6 February 1987 (aged 17)		(Spain) Espanyol
15	MF	Esteban Granero	2 July 1987 (aged 16)		(Spain) Real Madrid
16	DF	Jorge Gotor	14 April 1987 (aged 17)		(Spain) Zaragoza
17	FW	Jonathan Pereira	12 May 1987 (aged 16)		(Spain) Villarreal
18	DF	Cristian Pecci	10 May 1988 (aged 15)		(Spain) Betis

=== Turkey ===
Head coach:

No.	Pos.	Player	Date of birth (age)	Caps	Club
1	GK	**Volkan Babacan**	11 August 1988 (aged 15)		(Turkey) Fenerbahçe
2	DF	Melih Gündüz Çağrı	25 March 1987 (aged 17)		(Turkey) Gençlerbirliği
3	DF	Enis Kahraman	23 September 1987 (aged 16)		(Turkey) Sebatspor
4	MF	Bilal Çubukçu	16 May 1987 (aged 16)		(Germany) Hertha BSC
5	DF	Uğur Uçar	5 April 1987 (aged 17)		(Turkey) Galatasaray
6	MF	Kürşat Ergun Aydın	7 July 1987 (aged 16)		(Turkey) Beşiktaş
7	DF	Gürhan Gürsoy	24 September 1987 (aged 16)		(Turkey) Adanaspor
8	FW	Mülayim Erdem	10 January 1987 (aged 17)		(Turkey) Galatasaray
9	FW	Güven Güneri	22 September 1987 (aged 16)		(Turkey) Fenerbahçe
10	MF	Cafercan Aksu	15 January 1987 (aged 17)		(Turkey) Galatasaray
11	FW	**Serdar Özkan**	15 November 1987 (aged 16)		(Turkey) Beşiktaş
12	GK	Ali Melih Özçelik	21 January 1987 (aged 17)		
13	DF	Muharrem Kaya	9 March 1987 (aged 17)		
14	FW	Ergin Keleş	1 January 1987 (aged 17)		(Turkey) Trabzonspor
15	FW	Aydın Kaplan	2 January 1987 (aged 17)		
16	MF	Deniz Yılmaz	26 February 1988 (aged 16)		(Germany) SSV Ulm
17	MF	Ferhat Öztorun	14 September 1987 (aged 16)		
18	MF	Oğuz Sabankay	7 August 1987 (aged 16)		(Turkey) Galatasaray

== Group B ==
=== Austria ===
Head coach: Paul Gludovatz

No.	Pos.	Player	Date of birth (age)	Caps	Club
1	GK	Bartolomej Kuru	6 April 1987 (aged 17)		Austria Wien
2		Philipp Kummeer	9 February 1987 (aged 17)		
3	DF	Daniel Gramann	6 January 1987 (aged 17)		(Austria) Admira Wacker
4	DF	Andre Asinger	8 August 1987 (aged 16)		(Austria) Hartberg
5	DF	**Markus Suttner**	16 April 1987 (aged 17)		Austria Wien
6		Niklas Lercher	10 February 1987 (aged 17)		(Austria) Wacker Innsbruck
7	DF	Michael Madl	21 March 1988 (aged 16)		Austria Wien
8	MF	Georg Lederer	28 January 1987 (aged 17)		Austria Wien
9	FW	**Erwin Hoffer**	14 April 1987 (aged 17)		(Austria) Admira Wacker
10	MF	Paul Bichelhuber	22 February 1987 (aged 17)		(Austria) Rapid Wien
11	MF	Peter Hackmair	26 June 1987 (aged 16)		(Austria) Ried
12	GK	Andreas Lukse	11 August 1987 (aged 16)		(Austria) Rapid Wien
13	FW	**Rubin Okotie**	6 June 1987 (aged 16)		(Austria) Frank Stronach Football Academy
14	FW	**Patrick Bürger**	14 January 1987 (aged 17)		(Austria) Burgenland
15	FW	Besian Idrizaj	12 October 1987 (aged 16)		(Austria) LASK Linz
16	MF	Cemil Tosun	6 February 1987 (aged 17)		(Austria) Rapid Wien
17	MF	Michael Glauninger	28 January 1987 (aged 17)		(Austria) Grazer AK
18		Andreas Walzer	9 March 1987 (aged 17)		

=== England ===
Head coach: John Peacock

No.	Pos.	Player	Date of birth (age)	Caps	Club
1	GK	Ben Alnwick	1 January 1987 (aged 17)		(England) Sunderland
2	DF	Billy Jones	24 March 1987 (aged 17)		(England) Crewe Alexandra
3	DF	Nathan Ashton	30 January 1987 (aged 17)		(England) Charlton Athletic
4	MF	Mark Noble	8 May 1987 (aged 16)		(England) West Ham United
5	DF	Ben Parker	8 November 1987 (aged 16)		(England) Leeds United
6	MF	Gary Roberts	4 February 1987 (aged 17)		(England) Crewe Alexandra
7	FW	Shane Paul	25 January 1987 (aged 17)		(England) Aston Villa
8	MF	**Chris James**	4 July 1987 (aged 16)		(England) Fulham
9	FW	**Fraizer Campbell**	13 September 1987 (aged 16)		(England) Manchester United
10	FW	James Walker	25 November 1987 (aged 16)		(England) Charlton Athletic
11	MF	Kyel Reid	26 November 1987 (aged 16)		(England) West Ham United
12	DF	Richard Stearman	19 August 1987 (aged 16)		(England) Leicester City
13	GK	Joe Lewis	6 October 1987 (aged 16)		(England) Norwich City
14	MF	Nathan Doyle	12 January 1987 (aged 17)		(England) Derby County
15	DF	Simon Walton	13 September 1987 (aged 16)		(England) Leeds United
16	DF	David Wheater	14 February 1987 (aged 17)		(England) Middlesbrough
17	MF	Levi Porter	6 April 1987 (aged 17)		(England) Leicester City
18	MF	Mark Davies	18 February 1988 (aged 16)		(England) Wolverhampton Wanderers

=== Portugal ===
Head coach: Carlos Alberto Lopes Dinis

No.	Pos.	Player	Date of birth (age)	Caps	Club
1	GK	Ricardo Janota	10 March 1987 (aged 17)		(Portugal) Benfica
2	MF	Gilberto Silva	26 March 1987 (aged 17)		(Portugal) Boavista
3	DF	João Fonseca	17 January 1987 (aged 17)		(Portugal) Benfica
4	DF	Paulo Renato	14 May 1987 (aged 16)		(Portugal) Sporting CP
5	DF	André Marques	1 August 1987 (aged 16)		(Portugal) Sporting CP
6	DF	Daniel Bastos	11 February 1987 (aged 17)		(Portugal) Boavista
7	MF	Bruno Gama	15 November 1987 (aged 16)		(Portugal) Braga
8	MF	João Pinhal	14 January 1987 (aged 17)		(Portugal) Leixões
9	FW	Fausto Lourenço	19 January 1987 (aged 17)		(Portugal) Porto
10	MF	Rui Gomes	27 March 1987 (aged 17)		(Portugal) Boavista
11	MF	**Hélder Barbosa**	25 May 1987 (aged 16)		(Portugal) Porto
12	GK	**Rui Patrício**	15 February 1988 (aged 16)		(Portugal) Sporting CP
13	MF	Sandro Moreira	11 March 1987 (aged 17)		(Portugal) Belenenses
14	DF	João Pedro	29 December 1987 (aged 16)		(Portugal) Porto
15	FW	Bruno Moreira	6 September 1987 (aged 16)		(Portugal) Porto
16	MF	Cristiano Gomes	22 January 1987 (aged 17)		(Portugal) Benfica
17	MF	Feliciano Condesso	6 April 1987 (aged 17)		(England) Southampton
18	DF	Pedro Correia	27 March 1987 (aged 17)		(Portugal) Benfica

=== Ukraine ===
Head coach: Viktor Kashchey

No.	Pos.	Player	Date of birth (age)	Caps	Club
1	GK	Vladyslav Syamin	13 July 1987 (aged 16)		(Ukraine) Dynamo Kyiv
2	DF	Oleksiy Kudyanov	9 January 1987 (aged 17)		(Ukraine) Dynamo Kyiv
3	DF	Ihor Korotetskyi	13 September 1987 (aged 16)		(Ukraine) Shakhtar Donetsk
4	DF	Oleksiy Remezovskyi	11 January 1987 (aged 17)		(Ukraine) Dynamo Kyiv
5	DF	Irakli Tsykolia	26 May 1987 (aged 16)		(Ukraine) Dynamo Kyiv
6	MF	Oleh Moroz	18 April 1987 (aged 17)		
7	MF	Roman Dorosh	1 January 1987 (aged 17)		(Ukraine) Dynamo Kyiv
8	FW	**Oleksandr Yakovenko**	23 June 1987 (aged 16)		(Ukraine) Metalist Kharkiv
9	MF	**Denys Dedechko**	2 July 1987 (aged 16)		(Ukraine) Dynamo Kyiv
10	MF	**Denys Oliynyk**	16 June 1987 (aged 16)		(Ukraine) Dynamo Kyiv
11	FW	**Oleksandr Hladkyi**	24 August 1987 (aged 16)		(Ukraine) Metalist Kharkiv
12	GK	**Oleksandr Rybka**	10 April 1987 (aged 17)		(Ukraine) Vidradnyi Kyiv
13	DF	Hryhoriy Sakhnyuk	11 January 1987 (aged 17)		(Ukraine) Dynamo Kyiv
14	DF	Serhiy Bryzh	16 April 1987 (aged 17)		
15	FW	Ruslan Zanevskyi	27 November 1987 (aged 16)		(Ukraine) Shakhtar Donetsk
16	DF	Vadym Olishchuk	2 August 1987 (aged 16)		(Ukraine) Dynamo Kyiv
17	FW	Dmytro Moldovan	31 March 1987 (aged 17)		(Ukraine) Shakhtar Donetsk
18	MF	Yevhen Nakorenok	27 March 1987 (aged 17)		(Ukraine) Dynamo Kyiv
