= Benoît Pedretti =

French football manager (born 1980)

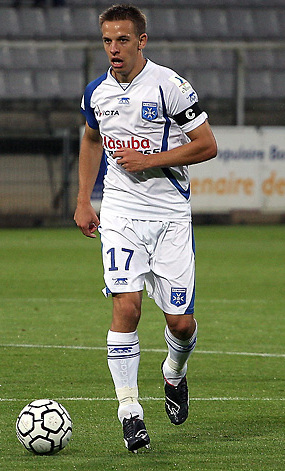
- Pedretti playing for Auxerre

Personal information
- Full name: Benoît Pedretti
- Date of birth: 12 November 1980 (age 46)
- Place of birth: Audincourt, Doubs, France
- Height: 1.78 m (5 ft 10 in)
- Position: Midfielder

Team information
- Current team: Nancy (manager)

Senior career*
Years	Team	Apps	(Gls)
1999–2004	Sochaux	141	(5)
2004–2005	Marseille	31	(3)
2005–2006	Lyon	21	(2)
2006–2011	Auxerre	154	(12)
2011–2013	Lille	60	(6)
2013–2015	Ajaccio	41	(3)
2015–2018	Nancy	66	(1)
Total		514	(32)

International career
2002–2005	France	22	(0)

Managerial career
- 2021–2023: Nancy B
- 2021–2022: Nancy (caretaker)
- 2023–: Nancy
Medal record
Men's football
Representing France
FIFA Confederations Cup
Winner	2003
UEFA European Under-21 Championship
Runner-up	2002
- * Club domestic league appearances and goals

Benoît Pedretti (born 12 November 1980) is a French football manager and former player who is the manager of Nancy. A midfielder, he was a deep-lying playmaker well-known for his wide range of passing.

He started his professional career at Sochaux, and played there from 1999 to 2004. Following brief stints with Marseille and Lyon where he spent one season each he joined Auxerre in 2006. In 2011 he left the club for Lille before moving to Ajaccio in 2013. His last stint was at Nancy, from 2015 to 2018.

At international level, Pedretti gained 22 caps for the France national team between 2002 and 2005.

== Club career ==
=== Sochaux ===
Pedretti began his career at FC Sochaux-Montbéliard in 1999, in the club's youth system, and in the same year, he played his first professional match. Sochaux finished the season in fourth place in the Division 2 missing out on promotion to the Ligue 1.

The following season, Pedretti, despite his inexperience, became a mainstay of the team taking part in all matches and thereby contributing to Sochaux's championship in the Division 2 in 2001.

He became a regular first team player in the 2002–03 Ligue 1 season making 35 league appearances and scoring 3 goals. The team also had a strong cup run that year, reaching the final of the Coupe de la Ligue, but losing 4–1 to Monaco. Pedretti featured in the UEFA Cup with Sochaux the following year as they qualified for European football. However they struggled to make any significant impact on the competition.

=== Marseille ===
Pedretti then moved to Olympique de Marseille for a transfer fee of €4.5 million in 2004. At Marseille, he found it difficult to cement his place in the starting line-up in a season marked by instability at the club with many players coming and going and coach José Anigo being replaced by Philippe Troussier during the season.

=== Lyon ===
Pedretti made 31 appearances in all competitions before moving to Olympique Lyonnais in 2005 for €7 million after one season at Marseille. He was again used sparingly at the club which at the time had fierce competition for midfield places. Pedretti only amassed 21 appearances in all competitions and was often denied a place by the likes of Florent Malouda and Juninho Pernambucano spending much time on the bench. He made his Champions League debut but was involved in only 21 league games in his only season for Lyon.

=== Auxerre ===
Pedretti again moved, this time to AJ Auxerre for a €6 million fee in 2006 after he decided to make a fresh start. This move gave Pedretti the first team action he had desired with him being a mainstay in their midfield for several years. During his time at the club he featured in the UEFA Cup and the Champions League.

During the subsequent 2007–08 season, he became captain of the "AJA", following the departure of Benoît Cheyrou to Marseille. He continued to show good performances, especially during the quarterfinals of the League Cup where he scored a decisive goal in stoppage time against his former team Marseille.

With multiple injuries keeping the Auxerre captain sidelined for several months during the 2010–11 season, Pedretti participated in 20 league games. After the end of the season, Pedretti stated his desire to leave Auxerre with league title holders Lille OSC being his preferred club.

Pedretti amassed 170 appearances during his five-year stay. He was a highly influential member of the squad and featured for the national team, increasing his total to 22 caps.

=== Lille ===
Pedretti was signed by Lille OSC for an undisclosed fee on the opening day of the summer 2011 transfer window as a replacement for Newcastle United-bound Yohan Cabaye. Pedretti said, “It [Lille] is a very good club with great, interesting challenges. […] My choice is to come to Lille."

=== Ajaccio ===
On 4 August 2013, Pedretti agreed a two-year deal with AC Ajaccio. He scored a wonder goal for Ajaccio in his second game for the club, netting from 20 yards out, in a 1–1 draw with reigning champions PSG on 18 August. Ajaccio decided not to renew his contract in 2015. Thus, he became a free agent.

=== Nancy ===
On 1 August 2015, Pedretti signed a one-year contract with AS Nancy Lorraine, with an option for a second year. In January 2018, having struggled with injuries at the end of the 2016–17 and the beginning of the 2017–18 season, he announced his retirement from professional football. He took up the role of assistant coach to Patrick Gabriel.

== International career ==
On 20 November 2002, Pedretti made his debut for the France national team that year, coming on as a late substitution for Lilian Thuram in a 3–0 win over Serbia and Montenegro. He was part of the French squad that won the Confederations Cup in 2003 and reached the quarter-finals at Euro 2004 when France were knocked out by the eventual champions Greece in the quarter finals by the score 1–0. He played 22 internationals for France the last of which was against Hungary in a 2–1 win.

== Career statistics ==
=== Club ===
Appearances and goals by club, season and competition
Club	Season	League			National cup		League cup		Europe		Other		Total	
Club	Season	Division	Apps	Goals	Apps	Goals	Apps	Goals	Apps	Goals	Apps	Goals	Apps	Goals
Sochaux	1999–2000	French Division 2	2	0	0	0	0	0	–		–		2	0
Sochaux	2000–01	French Division 2	38	0	1	0	1	0	–		–		40	0
Sochaux	2001–02	French Division 1	33	0	2	0	1	0	–		–		36	0
Sochaux	2002–03	Ligue 1	35	3	1	0	4	0	4	0	–		44	3
Sochaux	2003–04	Ligue 1	33	2	1	0	5	0	5	0	–		44	2
Sochaux	Total		141	5	5	0	11	0	9	0	0	0	166	5
Marseille	2004–05	Ligue 1	31	3	1	0	1	1	–		–		33	4
Lyon	2005–06	Ligue 1	21	2	2	0	1	0	5	0	–		29	2
Auxerre	2006–07	Ligue 1	31	1	1	1	2	0	6	0	—		40	2
Auxerre	2007–08	Ligue 1	37	1	1	0	4	2	—		—		42	3
Auxerre	2008–09	Ligue 1	30	1	1	1	1	0	—		—		32	2
Auxerre	2009–10	Ligue 1	36	4	4	1	1	0	—		—		41	5
Auxerre	2010–11	Ligue 1	20	5	1	0	2	1	8	0	—		31	6
Auxerre	Total		154	12	8	3	10	3	14	0	0	0	186	18
Lille	2011–12	Ligue 1	31	4	3	0	1	1	4	1	1 (Note: Appearance in Trophée des Champions)	0	40	6
Lille	2012–13	Ligue 1	29	2	3	0	3	0	6	0	—		41	2
Lille	Total		60	6	6	0	4	1	10	1	1	0	81	8
Ajaccio	2013–14	Ligue 1	14	1	0	0	1	0	—		—		15	1
Ajaccio	2014–15	Ligue 2	27	2	1	0	3	0	—		—		31	2
Ajaccio	Total		41	3	1	0	4	0	0	0	0	0	46	3
Nancy	2015–16	Ligue 2	33	0	0	0	2	0	—		—		35	0
Nancy	2016–17	Ligue 1	26	1	0	0	0	0	—		—		26	1
Nancy	2017–18	Ligue 2	7	0	1	0	0	0	—		—		8	0
Nancy	Total		66	1	1	0	2	0	0	0	0	0	69	1
Career total			514	32	24	3	33	5	38	1	1	0	610	41

=== International ===
Appearances and goals by national team and year
National team	Year	Apps	Goals
France	2002	1	0
France	2003	10	0
France	2004	7	0
France	2005	4	0
Total		22	0

== Managerial statistics ==
As of 2 January 2022

Managerial record by team and tenure
Team	From	To	Record							
Team	From	To	G	W	D	L	GF	GA	GD	Win %
Nancy B	18 June 2021	Present	5	2	1	2	12	5	+7	40.00
Nancy (caretaker)	25 September 2021	3 January 2022	13	4	4	5	14	17	−3	30.77
Total			18	6	5	7	26	22	+4	33.33

== Honours ==
Sochaux

- Division 2: 2000–01
- Coupe de la Ligue: 2003–04

Lyon

- Trophée des Champions: 2005, 2006
- Ligue 1: 2005–06

France

- FIFA Confederations Cup: 2003
