= 2006–07 AJ Auxerre season =

Auxerre
2006–07 season
- President: Jean-Claude Hamel
- Head coach: Jean Fernandez
- Stadium: Stade l'Abbé-Deschamps
- Ligue 1: 8th
- Coupe de France: Round of 64
- Coupe de la Ligue: Round of 16
- Intertoto Cup: Third round
- UEFA Cup: Group stage
- Top goalscorer: League: Ireneusz Jeleń (10); All: Ireneusz Jeleń (15)
- Average home league attendance: 10,097
Home colours	Away colours	Third colours

The 2006–07 season was the 101st season in the existence of AJ Auxerre and the club's 27th consecutive season in the top-flight of French football. In addition to the domestic league, Auxerre participated in this season's editions of the Coupe de France, the Coupe de la Ligue, the UEFA Intertoto Cup and UEFA Cup.

== First-team squad ==
Squad at end of season

Note: Flags indicate national team as defined under FIFA eligibility rules; some limited exceptions apply. Players may hold more than one non-FIFA nationality.

No.	Pos.	Nation	Player
1	GK	FRA	Fabien Cool
2	DF	FRA	Johan Radet
3	DF	FRA	Jean-Sébastien Jaurès
4	DF	SUI	Stéphane Grichting
6	MF	FRA	Benoît Pedretti
7	MF	FRA	Benoît Cheyrou
8	MF	SEN	Issa Ba
10	MF	DEN	Thomas Kahlenberg
11	MF	CIV	Kanga Akalé
12	DF	FRA	Jean-Pascal Mignot
13	MF	FRA	Kévin Lejeune
14	MF	FRA	Frédéric Thomas
15	DF	FRA	Baptiste Martin
16	GK	FRA	Anthony Basso

No.	Pos.	Nation	Player
18	MF	FRA	Lionel Mathis
19	MF	SEN	Moussa N'Diaye
20	FW	FRA	Ludovic Genest
21	FW	ROU	Daniel Niculae
22	FW	POL	Ireneusz Jeleń
26	DF	FRA	Younès Kaboul
27	FW	BFA	Alain Traoré
28	FW	POL	Kamil Oziemczuk
29	DF	FRA	Bacary Sagna
30	GK	FRA	Olivier Sorin
33	DF	FRA	Guillaume Lecacheur
40	GK	SVN	Denis Petrić (Note: Petrić was born in Ljubljana, Yugoslavia (now Slovenia), and represented Slovenia at U-17 and U-19 level, but also qualified to represent Serbia internationally and would later represent them at U-21 level.)
53	DF	TOG	Serge Akakpo
54	MF	FRA	Irélé Apo

=== Left club during season ===
Note: Flags indicate national team as defined under FIFA eligibility rules; some limited exceptions apply. Players may hold more than one non-FIFA nationality.

No.	Pos.	Nation	Player
5	DF	CZE	René Bolf (to Baník Ostrava)
9	FW	BEL	Luigi Pieroni (to Nantes)
17	MF	FRA	Hassan Yebda (Note: Yebda was born in Saint-Maurice, France, and represented them at U-16, U-17, U-18, and U-19 level, but also qualified to represent Algeria internationally and would make his international debut for Algeria in October 2009.) (to Le Mans)

No.	Pos.	Nation	Player
23	MF	HUN	Krisztián Vadócz (on loan to Motherwell)
24	DF	FRA	Michaël Ciani (on loan to Lorient)
25	DF	GUI	Oumar Kalabane (to Manisaspor)

== Competitions ==
=== Overall record ===
Competition	First match	Last match	Starting round	Final position	Record							
Competition	First match	Last match	Starting round	Final position	Pld	W	D	L	GF	GA	GD	Win %
Ligue 1	5 August 2006	26 May 2007	Matchday 1	8th	38	13	15	10	41	41	+0	34.21
Coupe de France	6 January 2007		Round of 64	Round of 64	1	0	1	0	2	2	+0	0.00
Coupe de la Ligue	20 September 2006	25 October 2006	Third round	Round of 16	2	1	0	1	2	1	+1	50.00
Intertoto Cup	15 July 2006	22 July 2006	Third round	Third round	2	1	0	1	4	2	+2	50.00
UEFA Cup	10 August 2006	14 December 2006	Second qualifying round	Group stage	8	4	1	3	17	11	+6	50.00
Total					51	19	17	15	66	57	+9	37.25

Source: Competitions

=== Ligue 1 ===
==== League table ====
Pos	Team	Pld	W	D	L	GF	GA	GD	Pts	Qualification or relegation
6	Bordeaux	38	16	9	13	39	35	+4	57	Qualification to UEFA Cup first round (Note: Bordeaux, the winner of the Coupe de la Ligue, is awarded entry to the 2007–08 UEFA Cup. The winners of the Coupe de France, Sochaux also have been awarded entry to the 2007–08 UEFA Cup.)
7	Sochaux	38	15	12	11	46	48	−2	57	Qualification to UEFA Cup first round
8	Auxerre	38	13	15	10	41	41	0	54	
9	Monaco	38	13	12	13	45	38	+7	51	
10	Lille	38	13	11	14	45	43	+2	50	

Source: Ligue 1
Rules for classification: 1) points; 2) goal difference; 3) number of goals scored.

==== Results summary ====
Overall								Home						Away					
Pld	W	D	L	GF	GA	GD	Pts	W	D	L	GF	GA	GD	W	D	L	GF	GA	GD
38	13	15	10	41	41	0	54	10	7	2	20	13	+7	3	8	8	21	28	−7

==== Results by round ====
Round	1	2	3	4	5	6	7	8	9	10	11	12	13	14	15	16	17	18	19	20	21	22	23	24	25	26	27	28	29	30	31	32	33	34	35	36	37	38
Ground	H	A	H	A	H	A	H	H	A	H	A	H	A	H	A	H	A	H	A	H	A	H	A	H	A	A	H	A	H	A	H	A	H	A	H	A	H	A
Result	D	D	L	L	W	W	D	W	L	D	L	L	D	W	L	D	D	W	D	W	L	W	L	D	D	D	W	W	W	D	D	L	D	D	W	L	W	W
Position	9	11	17	18	13	13	12	8	11	12	14	15	14	13	14	13	13	13	13	11	13	13	14	13	13	14	12	10	10	10	10	12	12	12	9	11	8	8

A = Away; H = Home; W = Win; D = Draw; L = Loss

==== Matches ====
5 August 2006 1	Auxerre	1–1	Valenciennes	Auxerre
20:00 CEST (UTC+2)		Report		Stadium: Stade de l'Abbé-Deschamps

12 August 2006 2	Sochaux	1–1	Auxerre	Bordeaux
20:00 CEST (UTC+2)		Report		Stadium: Stade Chaban-Delmas

19 August 2006 3	Auxerre	0–3	Marseille	Auxerre
17:15 CEST (UTC+2)		Report		Stadium: Stade de l'Abbé-Deschamps

27 August 2006 4	Nancy	1–0	Auxerre	Tomblaine
18:00 CEST (UTC+2)		Report		Stadium: Stade Marcel Picot

9 September 2006 5	Auxerre	2–1	Monaco	Auxerre
20:00 CEST (UTC+2)		Report		Stadium: Stade de l'Abbé-Deschamps

17 September 2006 6	Saint-Étienne	2–3	Auxerre	Saint-Étienne
18:00 CEST (UTC+2)		Report		Stadium: Stade Geoffroy-Guichard

23 September 2006 7	Auxerre	2–2	Sedan	Auxerre
20:00 CEST (UTC+2)		Report		Stadium: Stade de l'Abbé-Deschamps

1 October 2006 8	Auxerre	1–0	Nantes	Auxerre
18:00 CEST (UTC+2)		Report		Stadium: Stade de l'Abbé-Deschamps

14 October 2006 9	Rennes	3–1	Auxerre	Rennes
20:00 CEST (UTC+2)		Report		Stadium: Stade de la Route de Lorient

22 October 2006 10	Auxerre	0–0	Paris Saint-Germain	Auxerre
17:30 CEST (UTC+2)		Report		Stadium: Stade de l'Abbé-Deschamps

28 October 2006 11	Lens	1–0	Auxerre	Lens
17:15 CEST (UTC+2)		Report		Stadium: Stade Bollaert-Delelis

4 November 2006 12	Auxerre	2–3	Le Mans	Auxerre
20:00 CET (UTC+1)		Report		Stadium: Stade de l'Abbé-Deschamps

11 November 2006 13	Bordeaux	0–0	Auxerre	Bordeaux
17:15 CET (UTC+1)		Report		Stadium: Stade Chaban-Delmas

19 November 2006 14	Auxerre	1–0	Toulouse	Auxerre
18:00 CET (UTC+1)		Report		Stadium: Stade de l'Abbé-Deschamps

26 November 2006 15	Lyon	1–0	Auxerre	Lyon
21:00 CET (UTC+1)		Report		Stadium: Stade de Gerland

2 December 2006 16	Auxerre	0–0	Nice	Auxerre
20:00 CET (UTC+1)		Report		Stadium: Stade de l'Abbé-Deschamps

9 December 2006 17	Troyes	3–3	Auxerre	Troyes
20:00 CET (UTC+1)		Report		Stadium: Stade de l'Aube

17 December 2006 18	Auxerre	2–1	Lorient	Auxerre
18:00 CET (UTC+1)		Report		Stadium: Stade de l'Abbé-Deschamps

23 December 2006 19	Lille	1–1	Auxerre	Villeneuve-d'Ascq
20:00 CET (UTC+1)		Report		Stadium: Stadium Lille Métropole

13 January 2007 20	Auxerre	1–0	Sochaux	Auxerre
20:00 CET (UTC+1)		Report		Stadium: Stade de l'Abbé-Deschamps

24 January 2007 21	Marseille	3–1	Auxerre	Marseille
17:00 CET (UTC+1)		Report		Stadium: Stade Vélodrome

28 January 2007 22	Auxerre	2–0	Nancy	Auxerre
18:00 CET (UTC+1)		Report		Stadium: Stade de l'Abbé-Deschamps

3 February 2007 23	Monaco	2–1	Auxerre	Monaco
20:00 CET (UTC+1)		Report		Stadium: Stade Louis II

10 February 2007 24	Auxerre	1–1	Saint-Étienne	Auxerre
20:00 CET (UTC+1)		Report		Stadium: Stade de l'Abbé-Deschamps

17 February 2007 25	Sedan	2–2	Auxerre	Sedan
20:00 CET (UTC+1)		Report		Stadium: Stade Louis Dugauguez

24 February 2007 26	Nantes	1–1	Auxerre	Nantes
20:00 CET (UTC+1)		Report		Stadium: Stade de la Beaujoire

3 March 2007 27	Auxerre	1–0	Rennes	Auxerre
20:00 CET (UTC+1)		Report		Stadium: Stade de l'Abbé-Deschamps

11 March 2007 28	Paris Saint-Germain	0–1	Auxerre	Paris
18:00 CET (UTC+1)		Report		Stadium: Parc des Princes

18 March 2007 29	Auxerre	1–0	Lens	Auxerre
18:00 CET (UTC+1)		Report		Stadium: Stade de l'Abbé-Deschamps

1 April 2007 30	Le Mans	2–2	Auxerre	Le Mans
16:00 CEST (UTC+2)		Report		Stadium: Stade Léon-Bollée

7 April 2007 31	Auxerre	0–0	Bordeaux	Auxerre
20:00 CEST (UTC+2)		Report		Stadium: Stade de l'Abbé-Deschamps

14 April 2007 32	Toulouse	2–0	Auxerre	Toulouse
20:00 CEST (UTC+2)		Report		Stadium: Stadium de Toulouse

22 April 2007 33	Auxerre	0–0	Lyon	Auxerre
18:00 CEST (UTC+2)		Report		Stadium: Stade de l'Abbé-Deschamps

28 April 2007 34	Nice	0–0	Auxerre	Nice
20:00 CEST (UTC+2)		Report		Stadium: Stade du Ray

5 May 2007 35	Auxerre	1–0	Troyes	Auxerre
20:00 CEST (UTC+2)		Report		Stadium: Stade de l'Abbé-Deschamps

9 May 2007 36	Lorient	2–1	Auxerre	Lorient
20:30 CEST (UTC+2)		Report		Stadium: Stade du Moustoir

19 May 2007 37	Auxerre	2–1	Lille	Auxerre
20:45 CEST (UTC+2)		Report		Stadium: Stade de l'Abbé-Deschamps

26 May 2007 38	Valenciennes	1–3	Auxerre	Valenciennes
20:45 CEST (UTC+2)		Report		Stadium: Stade du Hainaut

=== Coupe de France ===
6 January 2007 Round of 64	Auxerre	2–2 (a.e.t.) (4–5 p)	Niort	Auxerre
21:00 CET (UTC+1)				Stadium: Stade de l'Abbé-Deschamps

=== Coupe de la Ligue ===
20 September 2006 Third round	Auxerre	2–0	Strasbourg	Auxerre
21:00 CEST (UTC+2)	Pieroni 40'; Kahlenberg 75'			Stadium: Stade de l'Abbé-Deschamps; Attendance: 4,368; Referee: Saïd Ennjimi

25 October 2006 Round of 16	Auxerre	0–1	Bordeaux	Auxerre
20:00 CEST (UTC+2)			Darcheville 23'	Stadium: Stade de l'Abbé-Deschamps; Attendance: 6,704; Referee: Tony Chapron

=== Intertoto Cup ===
==== Third round ====
15 July 2006 First leg	Auxerre (France)	4–1	(Romania) Farul Constanţa	Auxerre, France
	Mathis 7'; Pieroni 9'; Kahlenberg 53'; Traoré 77'		Guriță 17'	Stadium: Stade de l'Abbé-Deschamps

22 July 2006 Second leg	Farul Constanţa (Romania)	1–0 (2–4 agg.)	(France) Auxerre	Constanța, Romania
	Todoran 46' (pen.)			Stadium: Stadionul Farul

=== UEFA Cup ===
==== Second qualifying round ====
10 August 2006 First leg	OFK Beograd (Serbia)	1–0	(France) Auxerre	Belgrade, Serbia
	Bajalica 31'			Stadium: Omladinski Stadium; Referee: Tsvetan Georgiev (Bulgaria)

24 August 2006 Second leg	Auxerre (France)	5–1 (5–2 agg.)	(Serbia) OFK Beograd	Auxerre, France
20:00	Mignot 23'; Jeleń 44'; Pieroni 82', 86', 89'	Report	Pilipović 31'	Stadium: Stade de l'Abbé-Deschamps; Referee: Alfonso Pérez Burrull (Spain)

==== First round ====
14 September 2006 First leg	Dinamo Zagreb (Croatia)	1–2	(France) Auxerre	Zagreb, Croatia
20:15	Eduardo 69'	Report	Jeleń 43'; Niculae 72'	Stadium: Stadion Maksimir; Referee: Paolo Dondarini (Italy)

28 September 2006 Second leg	Auxerre (France)	3–1 (5–2 agg.)	(Croatia) Dinamo Zagreb	Auxerre, France
19:30	Jeleń 35', 41'; Mathis 70'	Report	Eduardo 61' (pen.)	Stadium: Stade de l'Abbé-Deschamps; Referee: Alon Yefet (Israel)

==== Group stage ====
Pos	Team	Pld	W	D	L	GF	GA	GD	Pts	Qualification
1	(Scotland) Rangers	4	3	1	0	8	4	+4	10	Advance to knockout stage
2	(Israel) Maccabi Haifa	4	2	1	1	5	4	+1	7	Advance to knockout stage
3	(Italy) Livorno	4	1	2	1	5	5	0	5	Advance to knockout stage
4	(France) Auxerre	4	1	1	2	7	7	0	4	
5	(Serbia) Partizan	4	0	1	3	2	7	−5	1	

19 October 2006 1	Maccabi Haifa (Israel)	3–1	(France) Auxerre	Tel Aviv, Israel
18:45	Masudi 13'; Boccoli 56'; Colautti 58'	Report	Niculae 29'	Stadium: Bloomfield Stadium; Attendance: 13,500; Referee: Lucílio Batista (Portugal)

23 November 2006 2	Auxerre (France)	2–2	(Scotland) Rangers	Auxerre, France
19:30	Jeleń 31'; Niculae 75'	Report	Novo 62'; Boyd 84'	Stadium: Stade de l'Abbé-Deschamps; Attendance: 14,000; Referee: Jonas Eriksson (Sweden)

29 November 2006 3	Partizan (Serbia)	1–4	(France) Auxerre	Belgrade, Serbia
20:45	Marinković 5'	Report	Cheyrou 18'; Niculae 24'; Akalé 36'; Pieroni 82'	Stadium: Partizan Stadium; Attendance: 4,000; Referee: Brage Sandmoen (Norway)

14 December 2006 4	Auxerre (France)	0–1	(Italy) Livorno	Auxerre, France
20:45		Report	Lucarelli 59'	Stadium: Stade de l'Abbé-Deschamps; Attendance: 8,000; Referee: Ivan Bebek (Croatia)
