= Rémy Riou =

French footballer (born 1987)

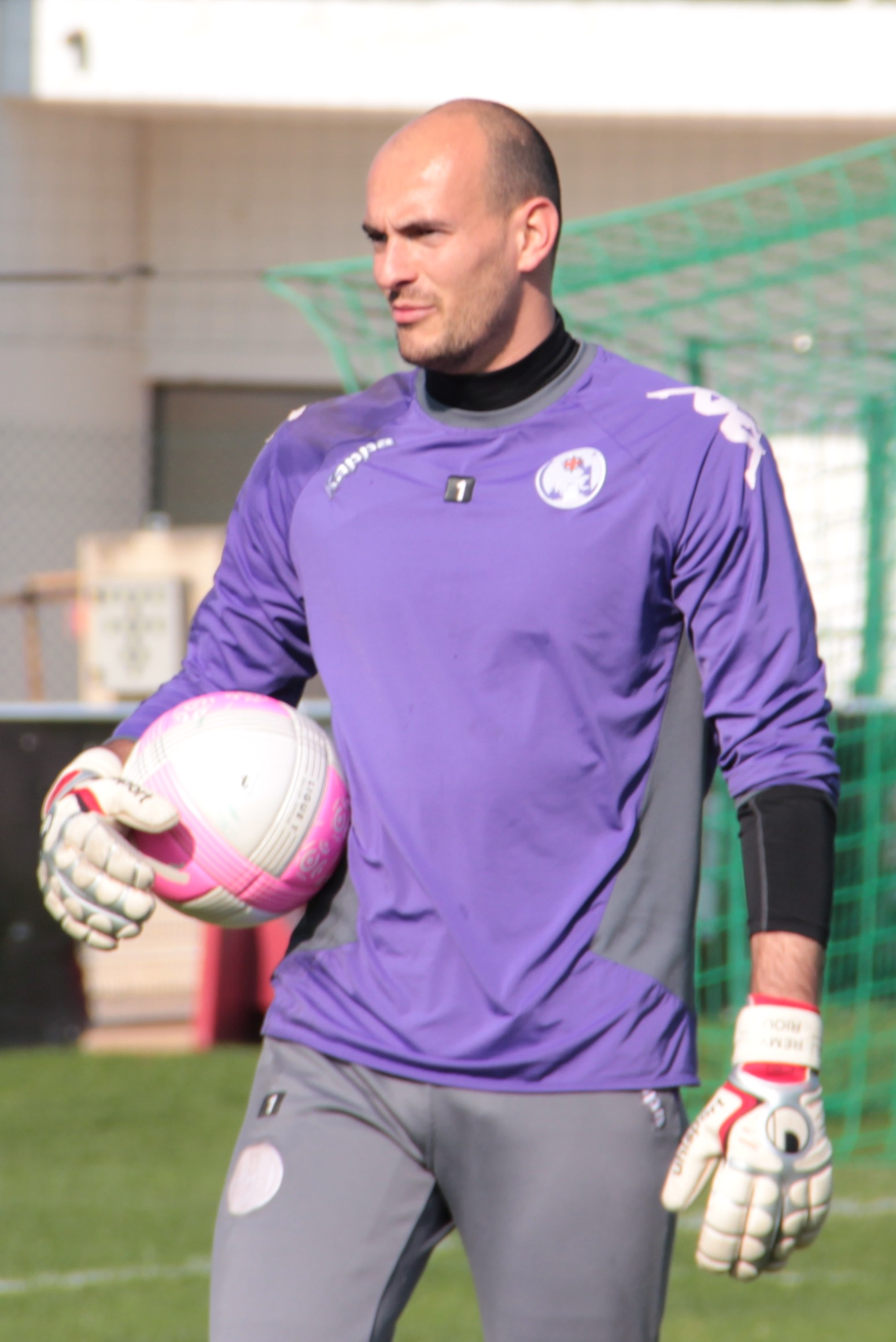
- Riou with Toulouse in 2012

Personal information
- Date of birth: 6 August 1987 (age 39)
- Place of birth: Lyon, France
- Height: 1.91 m (6 ft 3 in)
- Position: Goalkeeper

Youth career
- 1993–1995: FC Des Deux Fontaines
- 1995–2003: Lyon

Senior career*
| Years | Team | Apps | (Gls) |
| 2003–2007 | Lyon | 0 | (0) |
| 2006–2007 | → Lorient (loan) | 22 | (0) |
| 2007–2011 | Auxerre | 42 | (0) |
| 2010–2011 | Auxerre B | 7 | (0) |
| 2011–2012 | Toulouse | 0 | (0) |
| 2012–2017 | Nantes | 157 | (0) |
| 2014 | Nantes B | 1 | (0) |
| 2017–2018 | Alanyaspor | 9 | (0) |
| 2018–2019 | Charleroi | 10 | (0) |
| 2019–2022 | Caen | 82 | (0) |
| 2022–2024 | Lyon | 10 | (0) |
| 2024–2026 | Paris FC | 1 | (0) |

International career
| 2007–2008 | France U21 | 6 | (0) |
Medal record
Men's football
Representing France
UEFA European Under-17 Championship
| Winner | 2004 France | Team |
- * Club domestic league appearances and goals as of 17 May 2026

Rémy Riou (born 6 August 1987) is a French former professional footballer who played as a goalkeeper. He was a France youth international, having earned four caps with the country's under-21 team.

== Club career ==
Riou was a member Lyon's first team since 2003, but failed to make his Ligue 1 debut for the club and moved to Lorient on a one-season loan in July 2006. He made his Ligue 1 debut on 4 November 2006 in the Lorient's 1–0 away victory over Marseille. In July 2007, he moved to Auxerre on a four-year contract, making his Ligue 1 debut for the club on 18 August 2007 in their 1–0 home victory over Caen.

In the summer of 2012, he signed with Nantes.

On 19 July 2017, Riou moved to the Süper Lig joining Alanyaspor on a three-year contract.

On 24 May 2022, aged 34, Riou returned to Lyon, signing a two-year contract. He made his club debut in the first league game of the 2022–23 season, coming on as a substitute to replace the sent-off Anthony Lopes in a 2–1 home win over Ajaccio.

On 9 January 2024, Riou signed for Ligue 2 club Paris FC.

== International career ==
In 2004, Riou was part of the team that won the U17 Euro. He was the second choice goalkeeper during the tournament and didn't make any appearance.

Riou made four appearances for France's U21 team.

== Career statistics ==
As of match played 10 May 2025

Appearances and goals by club, season, and competition
| Club | Season | League | | | National cup | | League cup | | Europe | | Other | | Total | |
| Club | Season | Division | Apps | Goals | Apps | Goals | Apps | Goals | Apps | Goals | Apps | Goals | Apps | Goals |
|---|---|---|---|---|---|---|---|---|---|---|---|---|---|---|
| Lyon | 2006–07 | Ligue 1 | 0 | 0 | 0 | 0 | 0 | 0 | — | | 0 | 0 | 0 | 0 |
| Lorient (loan) | 2006–07 | Ligue 1 | 22 | 0 | 1 | 0 | 0 | 0 | — | | — | | 23 | 0 |
| Auxerre | 2007–08 | Ligue 1 | 19 | 0 | 2 | 0 | 1 | 0 | — | | — | | 22 | 0 |
| Auxerre | 2008–09 | Ligue 1 | 20 | 0 | 0 | 0 | 0 | 0 | — | | — | | 20 | 0 |
| Auxerre | 2009–10 | Ligue 1 | 3 | 0 | 3 | 0 | 1 | 0 | — | | — | | 7 | 0 |
| Auxerre | 2010–11 | Ligue 1 | 0 | 0 | 0 | 0 | 3 | 0 | 0 | 0 | — | | 3 | 0 |
| Auxerre | Total | | 42 | 0 | 6 | 0 | 5 | 0 | 0 | 0 | — | | 52 | 0 |
| Auxerre B | 2010–11 | Championnat de France Amateur | 7 | 0 | — | | — | | — | | — | | 7 | 0 |
| Toulouse | 2011–12 | Ligue 1 | 0 | 0 | 0 | 0 | 1 | 0 | — | | — | | 1 | 0 |
| Nantes | 2012–13 | Ligue 2 | 38 | 0 | 0 | 0 | 1 | 0 | — | | — | | 39 | 0 |
| Nantes | 2013–14 | Ligue 1 | 34 | 0 | 0 | 0 | 4 | 0 | — | | — | | 38 | 0 |
| Nantes | 2014–15 | Ligue 1 | 32 | 0 | 0 | 0 | 3 | 0 | — | | — | | 35 | 0 |
| Nantes | 2015–16 | Ligue 1 | 31 | 0 | 0 | 0 | 0 | 0 | — | | — | | 31 | 0 |
| Nantes | 2016–17 | Ligue 1 | 22 | 0 | 0 | 0 | 1 | 0 | — | | — | | 23 | 0 |
| Nantes | Total | | 157 | 0 | 0 | 0 | 9 | 0 | — | | — | | 166 | 0 |
| Nantes B | 2014–15 | Championnat de France Amateur | 1 | 0 | — | | — | | — | | — | | 1 | 0 |
| Alanyaspor | 2017–18 | Süper Lig | 9 | 0 | 2 | 0 | — | | — | | — | | 11 | 0 |
| Charleroi | 2018–19 | Belgian First Division A | 10 | 0 | 1 | 0 | — | | — | | — | | 11 | 0 |
| Charleroi | 2019–20 | Belgian First Division A | 0 | 0 | 0 | 0 | — | | — | | — | | 0 | 0 |
| Charleroi | Total | | 10 | 0 | 0 | 0 | — | | — | | — | | 11 | 0 |
| Caen | 2019–20 | Ligue 2 | 26 | 0 | 1 | 0 | — | | — | | — | | 27 | 0 |
| Caen | 2020–21 | Ligue 2 | 23 | 0 | 1 | 0 | — | | — | | — | | 24 | 0 |
| Caen | 2021–22 | Ligue 2 | 33 | 0 | 0 | 0 | — | | — | | — | | 33 | 0 |
| Caen | Total | | 82 | 0 | 2 | 0 | — | | — | | — | | 84 | 0 |
| Lyon | 2022–23 | Ligue 1 | 7 | 0 | 0 | 0 | — | | — | | — | | 7 | 0 |
| Lyon | 2023–24 | Ligue 1 | 3 | 0 | 1 | 0 | — | | — | | — | | 4 | 0 |
| Lyon | Total | | 10 | 0 | 1 | 0 | — | | — | | — | | 11 | 0 |
| Paris FC | 2023–24 | Ligue 2 | 0 | 0 | 1 | 0 | — | | — | | 0 | 0 | 1 | 0 |
| Paris FC | 2024–25 | Ligue 2 | 1 | 0 | 1 | 0 | — | | — | | — | | 2 | 0 |
| Paris FC | 2025–26 | Ligue 1 | 0 | 0 | 0 | 0 | — | | — | | — | | 0 | 0 |
| Paris FC | Total | | 1 | 0 | 2 | 0 | — | | — | | — | | 3 | 0 |
| Career total | | | 341 | 0 | 14 | 0 | 15 | 0 | 0 | 0 | 0 | 0 | 370 | 0 |

== Honours ==
Lyon

- Trophée des Champions: 2006

France U17

- UEFA European Under-17 Championship: 2004
