= Yahiaoui =

Yahiaoui is a surname. Notable people with the surname include:

- Abdel Monaim Yahiaoui (born 1966), Algerian weightlifter
- Ahmed Yahiaoui (born 1987), French footballer of Algerian origin
- Faten Yahiaoui (born 1985), Tunisian handball player
- Hakim Yahiaoui, Algerian athlete
