= El Mourabet =

El Mourabet is a Moroccan surname. Notable people with the surname include:

- Karim El Mourabet (born 1987), French footballer
- Samir El Mourabet (born 2005), Moroccan footballer
