= Mourlon =

Mourlon is a French surname. Notable people with the surname include:

- André Mourlon (1903–1970), French sprint runner
- Benoît Mourlon (born 1988), French association football player
- René Mourlon (1893–1977), French sprint runner, brother of André
