= 2010–11 AJ Auxerre season =

Auxerre
2010–11 season
- President: Alain Dujon
- Head coach: Jean Fernandez
- Stadium: Stade de l'Abbé-Deschamps
- Ligue 1: 9th
- Coupe de France: Round of 64
- Coupe de la Ligue: Semi-finals
- Champions League: Group stage
- Top goalscorer: League: Dennis Oliech (10); All: Roy Contout (4); Cédric Hengbart (4); Benoît Pedretti (4)
- Average home league attendance: 11,113
Home colours	Away colours	Third colours

The 2010–11 season was the 105th season in the existence of AJ Auxerre and the club's 31st consecutive season in the top-flight of French football. In addition to the domestic league, Auxerre participated in this season's editions of the Coupe de France, the Coupe de la Ligue and UEFA Champions League.

== First-team squad ==
Squad at end of season

Note: Flags indicate national team as defined under FIFA eligibility rules; some limited exceptions apply. Players may hold more than one non-FIFA nationality.

No.	Pos.	Nation	Player
1	GK	FRA	Olivier Sorin
2	DF	FRA	Cédric Hengbart
3	DF	CIV	Willy Boly
4	DF	SUI	Stéphane Grichting
5	MF	POL	Dariusz Dudka
6	DF	MLI	Adama Coulibaly
7	MF	MAR	Kamel Chafni (Note: Chafni was born in Bordeaux, France, but also qualified to represent Morocco internationally and made his international debut for Morocco in August 2008.)
8	MF	FRA	Anthony Le Tallec
9	MF	SLO	Valter Birsa
10	FW	FRA	Alexandre Licata
11	MF	FRA	Julien Quercia
12	DF	FRA	Jean-Pascal Mignot
13	MF	FRA	Christopher Missilou (Note: Missilou was born in Auxerre, France, and represented them at U-18 level, but also qualified to represent the Congo internationally and would make his international debut for the Congo in 2012.)
14	FW	KEN	Dennis Oliech
15	MF	FRA	Frédéric Sammaritano
16	GK	FRA	Rémy Riou
17	MF	FRA	Benoît Pedretti

No.	Pos.	Nation	Player
18	FW	GUF	Roy Contout
19	FW	FRA	Yaya Sanogo
20	DF	MLI	Amadou Sidibé
22	FW	POL	Ireneusz Jeleń
23	DF	FRA	Jérémy Berthod
24	FW	KOR	Jung Jo-gook
25	MF	FRA	Maxime Bourgeois
26	DF	FRA	Vincent Acapandié
27	FW	BFA	Alain Traoré
28	DF	MLI	Amara Morikè Kallé
29	MF	CGO	Delvin N'Dinga
30	GK	FRA	Willy Maeyens
31	DF	FRA	Bernard Onanga Itoua
32	MF	FRA	Thomas Monconduit
34	MF	TOG	Prince Segbefia
35	MF	FRA	Paul-Georges Ntep (Note: Ntep was born in Douala, Cameroon, but also qualified to represent France internationally and represented them at U-18, U-19, U-20, and U-21 level, before making his international debut for France in June 2015.)
40	GK	FRA	Simon Pontdemé

=== Left club during season ===
Note: Flags indicate national team as defined under FIFA eligibility rules; some limited exceptions apply. Players may hold more than one non-FIFA nationality.

No. / Pos. / Nation / Player; 21 / MF / MTQ / Steeven Langil (on loan to Valenciennes)	No. / Pos. / Nation / Player; 24 / MF / FRA / Lynel Kitambala (to Lorient)

== Competitions ==
=== Overall record ===
Competition	First match	Last match	Starting round	Final position	Record							
Competition	First match	Last match	Starting round	Final position	Pld	W	D	L	GF	GA	GD	Win %
Ligue 1	7 August 2010	29 May 2011	Matchday 1	9th	38	10	19	9	45	41	+4	26.32
Coupe de France	8 January 2011		Round of 64	Round of 64	1	0	0	1	1	2	−1	0.00
Coupe de la Ligue	27 October 2010	19 January 2011	Round of 16	Semi-finals	3	2	0	1	6	1	+5	66.67
Champions League	17 August 2010	8 December 2010	Play-off round	Group stage	8	2	0	6	5	13	−8	25.00
Total					50	14	19	17	57	57	+0	28.00

Source: Competitions

=== Ligue 1 ===
==== League table ====
Pos	Team	Pld	W	D	L	GF	GA	GD	Pts
7	Bordeaux	38	12	15	11	43	42	+1	51
8	Toulouse	38	14	8	16	38	36	+2	50
9	Auxerre	38	10	19	9	45	41	+4	49
10	Saint-Étienne	38	12	13	13	46	47	−1	49
11	Lorient	38	12	13	13	46	48	−2	49

Source: Ligue 1
Rules for classification: 1) points; 2) goal difference; 3) number of goals scored.

==== Results summary ====
Overall								Home						Away					
Pld	W	D	L	GF	GA	GD	Pts	W	D	L	GF	GA	GD	W	D	L	GF	GA	GD
38	10	19	9	45	41	+4	49	6	10	3	26	18	+8	4	9	6	19	23	−4

Source: Ligue 1

==== Results by round ====
Round	1	2	3	4	5	6	7	8	9	10	11	12	13	14	15	16	17	18	19	20	21	22	23	24	25	26	27	28	29	30	31	32	33	34	35	36	37	38
Ground	H	A	H	A	H	A	H	A	H	A	H	A	H	A	H	A	H	A	A	H	A	H	A	H	A	H	A	H	A	H	A	H	A	H	H	A	H	A
Result	D	D	D	L	D	L	D	W	L	W	W	D	W	D	L	D	D	D	D	D	L	D	L	D	L	W	L	W	D	D	W	D	D	W	W	D	L	W
Position	7	12	14	19	17	19	17	14	17	15	11	13	10	10	13	13	14	13	14	14	15	15	17	16	17	16	18	17	17	18	15	16	15	13	10	11	12	9

Source: Ligue 1
A = Away; H = Home; W = Win; D = Draw; L = Loss

==== Matches ====
7 August 2010 1	Auxerre	2–2	Lorient	Auxerre
21:00 CEST (UTC+2)		Report		Stadium: Stade de l'Abbé-Deschamps

14 August 2010 2	Brest	1–1	Auxerre	Brest
19:00 CEST (UTC+2)		Report		Stadium: Stade Francis-Le Blé

21 August 2010 3	Auxerre	1–1	Valenciennes	Auxerre
21:00 CEST (UTC+2)		Report		Stadium: Stade de l'Abbé-Deschamps

29 August 2010 4	Monaco	2–0	Auxerre	Monaco
17:00 CEST (UTC+2)		Report		Stadium: Stade Luis II

11 September 2010 5	Auxerre	1–1	Caen	Auxerre
19:00 CEST (UTC+2)		Report		Stadium: Stade de l'Abbé-Deschamps

19 September 2010 6	Lille	1–0	Auxerre	Villeneuve-d'Ascq
17:00 CEST (UTC+2)		Report		Stadium: Stadium Lille Métropole

25 September 2010 7	Auxerre	2–2	Nancy	Auxerre
19:00 CEST (UTC+2)		Report		Stadium: Stade de l'Abbé-Deschamps

2 October 2010 8	Arles-Avignon	0–4	Auxerre	Avignon
19:00 CEST (UTC+2)		Report		Stadium: Parc des Sports

16 October 2010 9	Auxerre	0–1	Bordeaux	Auxerre
19:00 CEST (UTC+2)		Report		Stadium: Stade de l'Abbé-Deschamps

24 October 2010 10	Paris Saint-Germain	2–3	Auxerre	Paris
17:00 CEST (UTC+2)		Report		Stadium: Parc des Princes

30 October 2010 11	Auxerre	2–0	Nice	Auxerre
19:00 CEST (UTC+2)		Report		Stadium: Stade de l'Abbé-Deschamps

6 November 2010 12	Sochaux	1–1	Auxerre	Sochaux
19:00 CET (UTC+1)		Report		Stadium: Stade Auguste Bonal

14 November 2010 13	Auxerre	2–1	Rennes	Auxerre
17:00 CET (UTC+1)		Report		Stadium: Stade de l'Abbé-Deschamps

20 November 2010 14	Saint-Étienne	1–1	Auxerre	Saint-Étienne
19:00 CET (UTC+1)		Report		Stadium: Stade Geoffroy-Guichard

28 November 2010 15	Auxerre	1–2	Toulouse	Auxerre
17:00 CET (UTC+1)		Report		Stadium: Stade de l'Abbé-Deschamps

4 December 2010 16	Lens	1–1	Auxerre	Lens
19:00 CET (UTC+1)		Report		Stadium: Stade Bollaert-Delelis

11 December 2010 17	Auxerre	1–1	Marseille	Auxerre
21:00 CET (UTC+1)		Report		Stadium: Stade de l'Abbé-Deschamps

18 December 2010 18	Montpellier	1–1	Auxerre	Montpellier
19:00 CET (UTC+1)		Report		Stadium: Stade de la Mosson

22 December 2010 19	Lyon	1–1	Auxerre	Lyon
19:00 CET (UTC+1)		Report		Stadium: Stade de Gerland

15 January 2011 20	Auxerre	1–1	Monaco	Auxerre
21:00 CET (UTC+1)		Report		Stadium: Stade de l'Abbé-Deschamps

29 January 2011 21	Caen	2–0	Auxerre	Caen
19:00 CET (UTC+1)		Report		Stadium: Stade Michel d'Ornano

6 February 2011 22	Auxerre	1–1	Lille	Auxerre
17:00 CET (UTC+1)		Report		Stadium: Stade de l'Abbé-Deschamps

12 February 2011 23	Nancy	3–1	Auxerre	Tomblaine
19:00 CET (UTC+1)		Report		Stadium: Stade Marcel Picot

19 February 2011 24	Auxerre	1–1	Arles-Avignon	Auxerre
19:00 CET (UTC+1)		Report		Stadium: Stade de l'Abbé-Deschamps

26 February 2011 25	Bordeaux	3–0	Auxerre	Bordeaux
21:00 CET (UTC+1)		Report		Stadium: Stade Chaban-Delmas

5 March 2011 26	Auxerre	1–0	Paris Saint-Germain	Auxerre
21:00 CET (UTC+1)		Report		Stadium: Stade de l'Abbé-Deschamps

12 March 2011 27	Nice	1–0	Auxerre	Nice
19:00 CET (UTC+1)		Report		Stadium: Stade du Ray

19 March 2011 28	Auxerre	2–0	Sochaux	Auxerre
19:00 CET (UTC+1)		Report		Stadium: Stade de l'Abbé-Deschamps

2 April 2011 29	Rennes	0–0	Auxerre	Rennes
19:00 CEST (UTC+2)		Report		Stadium: Stade de la Route de Lorient

9 April 2011 30	Auxerre	2–2	Saint-Étienne	Auxerre
19:00 CEST (UTC+2)		Report		Stadium: Stade de l'Abbé-Deschamps

16 April 2011 31	Toulouse	0–1	Auxerre	Toulouse
19:00 CEST (UTC+2)		Report		Stadium: Stadium de Toulouse

24 April 2011 32	Auxerre	1–1	Lens	Auxerre
17:00 CEST (UTC+2)		Report		Stadium: Stade de l'Abbé-Deschamps

1 May 2011 33	Marseille	1–1	Auxerre	Marseille
17:00 CEST (UTC+2)		Report		Stadium: Stade Vélodrome

7 May 2011 34	Auxerre	1–0	Montpellier	Auxerre
19:00 CEST (UTC+2)		Report		Stadium: Stade de l'Abbé-Deschamps

11 May 2011 35	Auxerre	4–0	Lyon	Auxerre
19:00 CEST (UTC+2)		Report		Stadium: Stade de l'Abbé-Deschamps

15 May 2011 36	Valenciennes	1–1	Auxerre	Valenciennes
17:00 CEST (UTC+2)		Report		Stadium: Stade du Hainaut

21 May 2011 37	Auxerre	0–1	Brest	Auxerre
21:00 CEST (UTC+2)		Report		Stadium: Stade de l'Abbé-Deschamps

29 May 2011 38	Lorient	1–2	Auxerre	Lorient
21:00 CEST (UTC+2)		Report		Stadium: Stade du Moustoir

=== Coupe de France ===
8 January 2011 Round of 64	Wasquehal	2–1	Auxerre	Villeneuve-d'Ascq
16:00 CET (UTC+1)	Aniekan (yellow card) 14'; Debuchy 80'; D. Coulibaly 90' (pen.)		A. Coulibaly 12'	Stadium: Stadium Nord Lille Métropole; Attendance: 3,093; Referee: Lionel Jaffredo

=== Coupe de la Ligue ===
27 October 2010 Round of 16	Auxerre	4–0	Bastia	Auxerre
20:00 CEST (UTC+2)	Quercia 8'; Sammaritano 25', 79'; Hengbart 68'	Report		Stadium: Stade de l'Abbé-Deschamps; Attendance: 7,557; Referee: Antony Gautier

9 November 2010 Quarter-finals	Auxerre	2–0	Saint-Étienne	Auxerre
20:45 CET (UTC+1)	Pedretti 16' (pen.); Dudka 48' (pen.)	Report		Stadium: Stade de l'Abbé-Deschamps; Attendance: 7,906; Referee: Damien Ledentu

19 January 2011 Semi-finals	Auxerre	0–2	Marseille	Auxerre
20:45 CET (UTC+1)		Report	Brandão 45+2'; Gignac 68'	Stadium: Stade de l'Abbé-Deschamps; Attendance: 17,025; Referee: Laurent Duhamel

=== Champions League ===
==== Play-off round ====
17 August 2010 First leg	Zenit Saint Petersburg (Russia)	1–0	(France) Auxerre	Saint Petersburg, Russia
18:30	Kerzhakov 3'	Report		Stadium: Petrovsky Stadium; Attendance: 21,405; Referee: Björn Kuipers (Netherlands)

25 August 2010 Second leg	Auxerre (France)	2–0 (2–1 agg.)	(Russia) Zenit Saint Petersburg	Auxerre, France
20:45	Hengbart 9'; Jeleń 53'	Report		Stadium: Stade de l'Abbé-Deschamps; Attendance: 15,277; Referee: Damir Skomina (Slovenia)

==== Group stage ====
Pos	Team	Pld	W	D	L	GF	GA	GD	Pts	Qualification
1	(Spain) Real Madrid	6	5	1	0	15	2	+13	16	Advance to knockout phase
2	(Italy) Milan	6	2	2	2	7	7	0	8	Advance to knockout phase
3	(Netherlands) Ajax	6	2	1	3	6	10	−4	7	Transfer to Europa League
4	(France) Auxerre	6	1	0	5	3	12	−9	3	

Source: Soccerway

15 September 2010 1	Milan (Italy)	2–0	(France) Auxerre	Milan, Italy
20:45	Ibrahimović 66', 69'	Report		Stadium: San Siro; Attendance: 69,317; Referee: Cristian Balaj (Romania)

28 September 2010 2	Auxerre (France)	0–1	(Spain) Real Madrid	Auxerre, France
20:45		Report	Di María 81'	Stadium: Stade de l'Abbé-Deschamps; Attendance: 19,525; Referee: Claus Bo Larsen (Denmark)

19 October 2010 3	Ajax (Netherlands)	2–1	(France) Auxerre	Amsterdam, Netherlands
20:45	De Zeeuw 7'; Suárez 41'	Report	Birsa 56'	Stadium: Amsterdam Arena; Attendance: 51,383; Referee: Olegário Benquerença (Portugal)

3 November 2010 4	Auxerre (France)	2–1	(Netherlands) Ajax	Auxerre, France
20:45	Sammaritano 9'; Langil 84'	Report	Alderweireld 79'	Stadium: Stade de l'Abbé-Deschamps; Attendance: 18,727; Referee: Mark Clattenburg (England)

23 November 2010 5	Auxerre (France)	0–2	(Italy) Milan	Auxerre, France
20:45		Report	Ibrahimović 64'; Ronaldinho 90+1'	Stadium: Stade de l'Abbé-Deschamps; Attendance: 19,244; Referee: Damir Skomina (Slovenia)

8 December 2010 6	Real Madrid (Spain)	4–0	(France) Auxerre	Madrid, Spain
20:45	Benzema 12', 72', 88'; Ronaldo 49'	Report		Stadium: Santiago Bernabéu; Attendance: 54,917; Referee: Serge Gumienny (Belgium)
