= 2004 UEFA European Under-17 Championship =

2004 UEFA Under-17 Championship
Championnat d'Europe de football des moins de 17 ans 2004

Tournament details
- Host country: France
- Dates: 4–15 May
- Teams: 8
- Venues: 7 (in 7 host cities)

Final positions
- Champions: France (1st title)
- Runners-up: Spain
- Third place: Portugal
- Fourth place: England

Tournament statistics
- Matches played: 16
- Goals scored: 52 (3.25 per match)
- Attendance: 63,155 (3,947 per match)
- Top scorer(s): (France) Hatem Ben Arfa (Portugal) Bruno Gama (England) Shane Paul (Spain) Marc Pedraza (3 goals each)
- Best player: (Spain) Cesc Fàbregas

The 2004 UEFA European Under-17 Championship was the third edition of UEFA's European Under-17 Football Championship. France hosted the championship, during 4–15 May. Host France defeated Spain in the final to win the competition for the first time.

== Match Officials ==
A total of 6 referees, 8 assistant referees and 2 fourth officials were appointed for the final tournament.

Referees

- (Greece) Christoforos Zografos
- (The Gambia) Modou Sowe
- (Belgium) Joeri Van De Velde
- (Czech Republic) Radek Matejek
- (Poland) Marek Mikolajewski
- (Croatia) Marijo Strahonja

Assistant referees

- (Wales) Simon Lee Evans
- (Georgia (country)) Zaza Menteshashvili
- (Sweden) Erik Bergsten
- (Italy) Alessandro Griselli
- (Lithuania) Vytautas Simkus
- (Bulgaria) Nikolay Petrov
- (Ethiopia) Luleseged Begashaw
- (North Macedonia) Toni Gligorov

Fourth officials

- (France) Olivier Thual
- (France) Fredy Fautrel

== Group stage ==
=== Group A ===
Teams	GP	W	D	L	GF	GA	GD	Pts
France	3	3	0	0	6	1	+5	9
Spain	3	2	0	1	5	2	+3	6
Turkey	3	1	0	2	6	5	+1	3
Northern Ireland	3	0	0	3	3	12	−9	0

4 May 2004
16:00 CET

Spain	1–0	Turkey
Marquitos 40'	Report

Stade Georges Boulogne, Amboise
Attendance: 1,500
Referee: Joeri Van De Velde (Belgium)
4 May 2004
18:00 CET

France	3–0	Northern Ireland
Benzema 73'; Ben Arfa 76'; Songo'o 79'	Report

Les Allées, Blois
Attendance: 4,280
Referee: Marijo Strahonja (Croatia)

6 May 2004
18:00 CET

Northern Ireland	2–5	Turkey
Turner 42' (pen.); O'Connor 82'	Report	Keleş 14', 36'; Yılmaz 22'; Aksu 23'; Sabankay 74'

Stade Jules Ladoumègue, Romorantin-Lanthenay
Attendance: 2,293
Referee: Marek Mikolajewski (Poland)
6 May 2004
19:00 CET

France	1–0	Spain
Suárez 18' (o.g.)	Report

Les Allées, Blois
Attendance: 4,962
Referee: Christoforos Zografos (Greece)

9 May 2004
17:30 CET

Turkey	1–2	France
Aksu 83'	Report	Ben Arfa 42'; Ménez 69'

Stade Georges Boulogne, Amboise
Attendance: 5,460
Referee: Radek Matějek (Czech Republic)
9 May 2004
17:30 CET

Northern Ireland	1–4	Spain
Doherty 49'	Report	Pedraza 27', 35', 42'; Capel 66'

Stade Guy Drut, Saint-Cyr-sur-Loire
Attendance: 1,914
Referee: Modou Sowe (Gambia)

=== Group B ===
Teams	GP	W	D	L	GF	GA	GD	Pts
England	3	3	0	0	6	1	+5	9
Portugal	3	1	1	1	5	3	+2	4
Austria	3	1	1	1	2	2	0	4
Ukraine	3	0	0	3	1	8	−7	0

4 May 2004
15:00 CET

Ukraine	0–2	England
	Report	Paul 60'; Doyle 79'

Stade Péteseilles, Avoine
Attendance: 2,254
Referee: Christoforos Zografos (Greece)
4 May 2004
20:00 CET

Austria	0–0	Portugal
	Report

Stade de la Vallée du Cher, Tours
Attendance: 2,502
Referee: Modou Sowe (Gambia)

6 May 2004
15:00 CET

Ukraine	1–2	Austria
Dorosh 5'	Report	Gramann 9' (pen.), 11'

Stade Guy Drut, Saint-Cyr-sur-Loire
Attendance: 1,489
Referee: Marijo Strahonja (Croatia)
6 May 2004
15:00 CET

England	3–1	Portugal
Paul 4', 56'; Davies 79'	Report	Moreira 8'

Stade de la Vallée du Cher, Tours
Attendance: 2,582
Referee: Radek Matějek (Czech Republic)

9 May 2004
20:00 CET

Portugal	4–0	Ukraine
Gama 11', 22' (pen.); Gomes 51'; Fausto 82'	Report

Stade Péteseilles, Avoine
Attendance: 2,338
Referee: Marek Mikolajewski (Poland)
9 May 2004
20:00 CET

England	1–0	Austria
Porter 54'	Report

Les Allées, Blois
Attendance: 2,500
Referee: Joeri Van De Velde (Belgium)

== Knockout stage ==
=== Semifinals ===
12 May 2004
17:30 CET

France	3–1	Portugal
Nasri 52'; Ménez 56'; Ben Arfa 62'	Report	Moreira 27'

Les Allées, Blois
Attendance: 5,742
Referee: Marek Mikolajewski (Poland)

12 May 2004
19:30 CET

England	1–2	Spain
Reid 18'	Report	Marquitos 10'; Fàbregas 80' (pen.)

Stade de la Vallée du Cher, Tours
Attendance: 5,339
Referee: Joeri Van De Velde (Belgium)

=== Third Place Playoff ===
15 May 2004
15:30 CET

Portugal	4–4	England
Fausto 13'; João Pedro 24', 98'; Gama 59'	Report	Walker 25', 97' (pen.); Reid 45'; Davies 62'
Penalties
Gama (penalty scored); Gomes (penalty scored); Barbosa (penalty missed); João Pedro (penalty scored)	3–2	(penalty missed) Walker; (penalty scored) Doyle; (penalty scored) James; (penalty missed) Porter; (penalty missed) Wheater

Stade Gaston Petit, Châteauroux
Attendance: 5,000
Referee: Marijo Strahonja (Croatia)

=== Final ===
15 May 2004
19:00 CET

France	2–1	Spain
Constant 1'; Nasri 79'	Report	Piqué 63'

Stade Gaston Petit, Châteauroux
Attendance: 13,000
Referee: Christoforos Zografos (Greece)
