= Irakli Tsykolia =

Ukrainian footballer (born 1987)

Personal information
- Full name: Irakli Huramovych Tsykolia
- Date of birth: 26 May 1987 (age 39)
- Place of birth: Sukhumi, Georgian SSR
- Height: 1.82 m (6 ft 0 in)
- Position: Defender

Team information
- Current team: FC Kolkheti-1913 Poti
- Number: 4

Youth career
- 2003–2004: FC Dynamo Kyiv

Senior career*
Years	Team	Apps	(Gls)
2004–2006	FC Dynamo Kyiv	0	(0)
2004–2006	→ FC Dynamo-3 Kyiv	31	(0)
2006–2007	FC CSKA Kyiv	1	(0)
2007	KajHa		(1)
2007	AC Oulu	1	(0)
2008	RoPS	2	(0)
2009	TP-47	7	(0)
2009	FC Taraz	13	(0)
2010–2014	FSC Bukovyna Chernivtsi	82	(0)
2013	→ FC Arsenal Bila Tserkva (loan)	6	(0)
2014–2017	FC Naftovyk-Ukrnafta Okhtyrka	87	(2)
2017–2018	PFC Sumy	19	(2)
2018–	FC Kolkheti-1913 Poti	14	(0)

International career
2003	Ukraine U16	4	(0)
2003–2004	Ukraine U17	15	(0)
2005	Ukraine U18	12	(0)
2005	Ukraine U19	7	(0)
- * Club domestic league appearances and goals as of 10 November 2018

Irakli Huramovych Tsykolia (Ukrainian: Іраклій Гурамович Циколія; born 26 May 1987) is a Ukrainian footballer who plays for Georgian club FC Kolkheti-1913 Poti.

== Club career ==
Tsykolia made his professional debut for FC Dynamo-3 Kyiv in the Ukrainian Second League in the 2004–05 season. He spent most of his career in the Ukrainian second-tier Ukrainian First League.

== International ==
He represented Ukraine at the 2004 UEFA European Under-17 Championship, in which Ukraine lost all three games.
