= 2001–02 FC Sochaux-Montbéliard season =

Sochaux
2001–02 season
- President: Jean-Claude Plessis
- Manager: Jean Fernandez
- Stadium: Stade Auguste Bonal
- French Division 1: 8th
- Coupe de France: Round of 32
- Coupe de la Ligue: Round of 32
- Top goalscorer: League: Pierre-Alain Frau (14); All: Pierre-Alain Frau (14)

The 2001–02 season was the 73rd season in the existence of FC Sochaux-Montbéliard and the club's first season back in the top flight of French football. In addition to the domestic league, Sochaux participated in this season's editions of the Coupe de France, and Coupe de la Ligue. The season covered the period from 1 July 2001 to 30 June 2002.

== First-team squad ==
Squad at end of season

== Competitions ==
=== Overview ===
Competition	First match	Last match	Starting round	Final position	Record							
Competition	First match	Last match	Starting round	Final position	Pld	W	D	L	GF	GA	GD	Win %
French Division 1	28 July 2001	4 May 2002	Matchday 1	8th	34	12	10	12	41	40	+1	35.29
Coupe de France	15 December 2001	19 January 2002	Round of 64	Round of 32	2	1	0	1	6	3	+3	50.00
Coupe de la Ligue	1 December 2001		Round of 32	Round of 32	1	0	1	0	0	0	+0	0.00
Total					37	13	11	13	47	43	+4	35.14

Source: Competitions

=== Division 1 ===
==== League table ====
Pos	Team	Pld	W	D	L	GF	GA	GD	Pts	Qualification or relegation
6	Bordeaux	34	14	8	12	34	31	+3	50	Qualification to UEFA Cup first round (Note: Bordeaux was qualified for the 2002–03 UEFA Cup as winners of the 2001–02 Coupe de la Ligue.)
7	Troyes	34	13	8	13	40	35	+5	47	Qualification to Intertoto Cup second round
8	Sochaux	34	12	10	12	41	40	+1	46	Qualification to Intertoto Cup second round
9	Marseille	34	11	11	12	34	39	−5	44	
10	Nantes	34	12	7	15	35	41	−6	43	

Source: Ligue 1
Rules for classification: 1) points; 2) goal difference; 3) number of goals scored.

==== Results summary ====
Overall								Home						Away					
Pld	W	D	L	GF	GA	GD	Pts	W	D	L	GF	GA	GD	W	D	L	GF	GA	GD
34	12	10	12	41	40	+1	46	9	3	5	29	17	+12	3	7	7	12	23	−11

==== Results by round ====
Round	1	2	3	4	5	6	7	8	9	10	11	12	13	14	15	16	17	18	19	20	21	22	23	24	25	26	27	28	29	30	31	32	33	34
Ground	A	H	A	H	A	H	A	H	A	H	A	H	A	H	A	H	A	A	H	A	H	A	H	A	H	A	H	A	H	A	H	A	H	H
Result	W	W	L	D	D	W	L	W	D	W	D	L	D	W	L	L	W	D	L	D	L	W	L	L	D	L	W	D	W	L	W	L	D	W
Position	5	2	3	6	6	5	6	5	5	5	5	6	6	5	7	8	7	7	7	7	8	8	8	9	8	11	9	8	8	8	8	8	8	8

A = Away; H = Home; W = Win; D = Draw; L = Loss

==== Matches ====
28 July 2001 1	Monaco	0–1	Sochaux	Monaco
CEST (UTC+2)

4 August 2001 2	Sochaux	4–3	Rennes	Montbéliard
CEST (UTC+2)				Stadium: Stade Auguste Bonal

11 August 2001 3	Paris Saint-Germain	1–0	Sochaux	Paris
CEST (UTC+2)

18 August 2001 4	Sochaux	2–2	Lorient	Montbéliard
CEST (UTC+2)				Stadium: Stade Auguste Bonal

25 August 2001 5	Montpellier	0–0	Sochaux	Montpellier
CEST (UTC+2)

9 September 2001 6	Sochaux	2–0	Bordeaux	Montbéliard
CEST (UTC+2)				Stadium: Stade Auguste Bonal

15 September 2001 7	Lens	3–0	Sochaux	Lens
CEST (UTC+2)

23 September 2001 8	Sochaux	3–0	Sedan	Montbéliard
CEST (UTC+2)				Stadium: Stade Auguste Bonal

30 September 2001 9	Troyes	2–2	Sochaux	Troyes
CEST (UTC+2)

13 October 2001 10	Sochaux	4–1	Bastia	Montbéliard
CEST (UTC+2)				Stadium: Stade Auguste Bonal

20 October 2001 11	Lyon	1–1	Sochaux	Lyon
CEST (UTC+2)

27 October 2001 12	Sochaux	0–1	Nantes	Montbéliard
CEST (UTC+2)				Stadium: Stade Auguste Bonal

3 November 2001 13	Guingamp	0–0	Sochaux	Guingamp
CET (UTC+1)

17 November 2001 14	Sochaux	2–0	Metz	Montbéliard
CET (UTC+1)				Stadium: Stade Auguste Bonal

24 November 2001 15	Marseille	4–2	Sochaux	Marseille
CET (UTC+1)

28 November 2001 16	Sochaux	1–2	Auxerre	Montbéliard
CET (UTC+1)				Stadium: Stade Auguste Bonal

9 December 2001 17	Lille	1–2	Sochaux	Lille
CET (UTC+1)
