= Benoît Mourlon =

French footballer (born 1988)

Personal information
- Date of birth: 14 July 1988 (age 38)
- Place of birth: Auxerre, France
- Height: 1.83 m (6 ft 0 in)
- Position: Midfielder

Team information
- Current team: Auxerre
- Number: 46

Youth career
- 1999–2006: Auxerre

Senior career*
Years	Team	Apps	(Gls)
2006–	Auxerre	303	(70)
- * Club domestic league appearances and goals as of 05:43, 4 February 2008 (UTC)

Benoît Mourlon (born 14 July 1988) is a French footballer who plays as midfielder for Auxerre in the French Ligue 1. (Note: Benoît Mourlon – French league stats at LFP – also available in French (archived))

== Career statistics ==
Appearances and goals by club, season and competition
Club	Season	League			Cup		Continental		Total	
Club	Season	Division	Apps	Goals	Apps	Goals	Apps	Goals	Apps	Goals
Auxerre	2005–06	Ligue 1	0	0	1	0	—		1	0
Auxerre	2006–07	Ligue 1	4	0	0	0	—		4	0
Auxerre	2007–08	Ligue 1	17	5	5	1	5	1	27	7
Auxerre	2008–09	Ligue 1	8	2	0	0	—		8	2
Auxerre	2009–10	Ligue 1	29	7	0	0	5	1	34	8
Auxerre	2010–11	Ligue 1	22	3	0	0	5	1	27	4
Auxerre	2011–12	Ligue 1	23	6	0	0	—		23	6
Auxerre	2012–13	Ligue 2	25	8	0	0	—		25	8
Auxerre	2013–14	Ligue 2	27	5	0	0	7	2	34	7
Auxerre	2014–15	Ligue 2	28	6	3	1	—		31	7
Auxerre	2015–16	Ligue 2	25	4	5	1	8	2	38	7
Auxerre	2016–17	Ligue 2	29	5	4	0	—		33	5
Auxerre	2017–18	Ligue 2	27	3	2	0	6	1	35	4
Auxerre	2018–19	Ligue 2	28	4	2	1	4	0	34	5
Auxerre	2019–20	Ligue 2	23	5	1	0	6	2	30	7
Auxerre	2020–21	Ligue 2	21	3	—		—		21	3
Auxerre	2021–22	Ligue 2	12	2	4	0	1	0	17	2
Auxerre	2022–23	Ligue 1	20	5	1	0	—		21	5
Auxerre	2023–24	Ligue 2	25	8	2	1	—		27	9
Career total			303	70	28	4	47	11	378	85

== Honours ==
Auxerre

- Coupe de France: 2009–10
- Trophée des Champions: 2010
- Ligue 2: 2023–24
