= Hryhoriy Sakhnyuk =

Ukrainian footballer

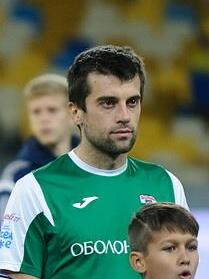
- Sakhnyuk with Obolon-Brovar Kyiv in 2015

Personal information
- Full name: Hryhoriy Sakhnyuk
- Date of birth: 11 January 1987 (age 39)
- Place of birth: Ukrainian SSR
- Height: 1.70 m (5 ft 7 in)
- Position: Defender

Senior career*
Years	Team	Apps	(Gls)
2004–2005	Dynamo Kyiv	0	(0)
2004–2005	→ Dynamo-3 Kyiv	32	(7)
2007	CSKA Kyiv	15	(0)
2007–2008	Kryvbas Kryvyi Rih	1	(0)
2010	Bukovyna Chernivtsi	6	(0)
2010–2012	Stal Dniprodzerzhynsk	59	(20)
2013	Hirnyk Kryvyi Rih	28	(9)
2014–2017	Obolon-Brovar Kyiv	85	(9)

International career
- Ukraine U21
- * Club domestic league appearances and goals

Hryhoriy Sakhnyuk (previously Hryhoriy Haranyan) (born 11 January 1987) is a Ukrainian former professional football defender. Sakhnyuk was also a member of the Ukrainian Ukrainian national under-21 football team.
