= Kamil Oziemczuk =

Polish footballer

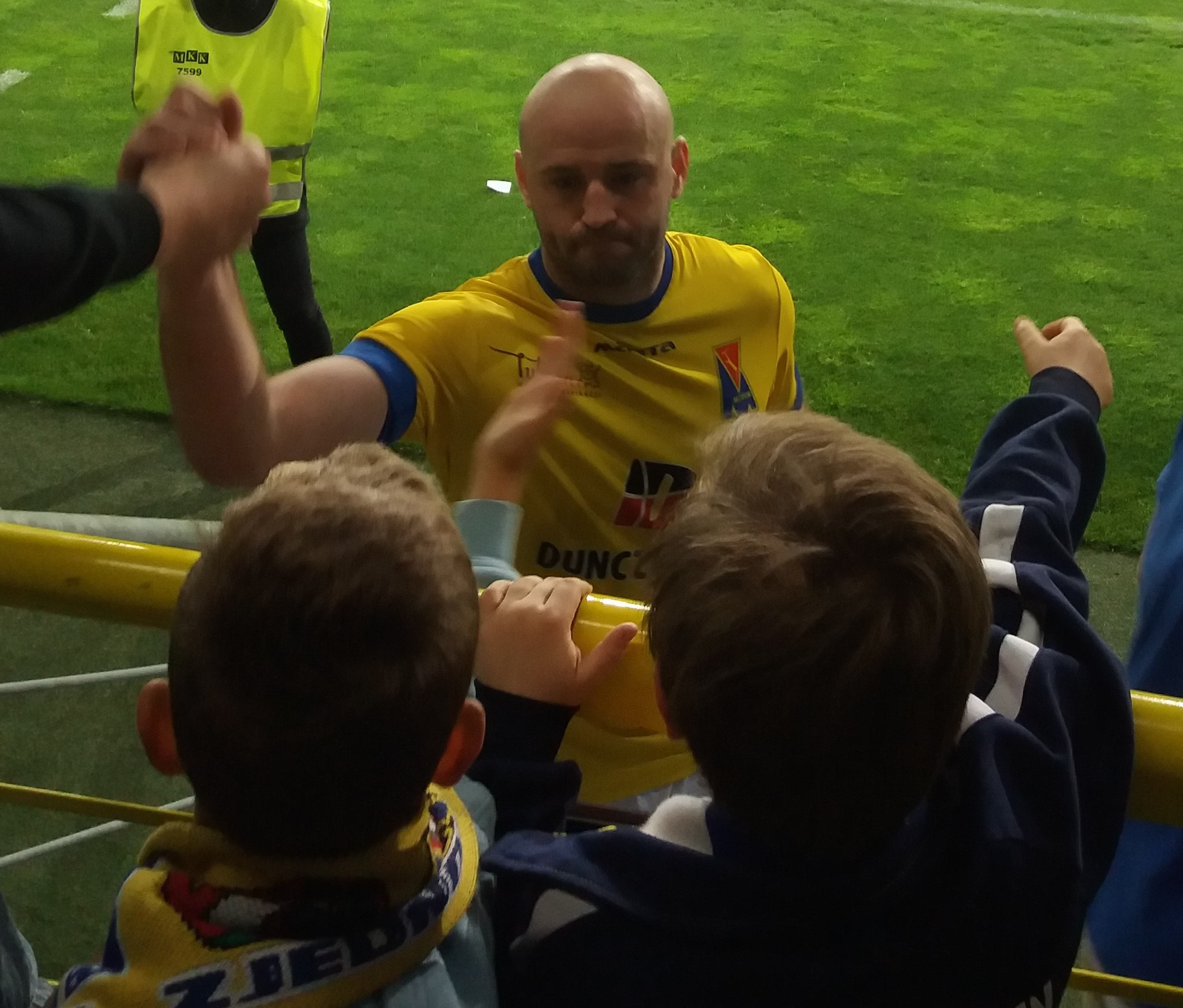
- Oziemczuk with Motor Lublin in 2018

Personal information
- Date of birth: 29 March 1988 (age 38)
- Place of birth: Lublin, Poland
- Height: 1.74 m (5 ft 8 1/2 in)
- Position: Striker

Team information
- Current team: Cisowianka Drzewce
- Number: 9

Youth career
- –2004: Górnik Łęczna

Senior career*
Years	Team	Apps	(Gls)
2004–2006	Górnik Łęczna	17	(3)
2006–2008	Auxerre	0	(0)
2008–2009	Motor Lublin	35	(2)
2010–2014	Górnik Łęczna	48	(2)
2014	→ Orlęta Radzyń Podlaski (loan)	14	(4)
2014–2016	Avia Świdnik	57	(16)
2016–2018	Motor Lublin	49	(14)
2018–2020	Hetman Zamość	44	(31)
2020–2021	Avia Świdnik	50	(15)
2022	Tur Milejów	4	(1)
2024–	Cisowianka Drzewce	51	(22)

International career
2006	Poland U19	5	(2)
2006	Poland U21	1	(1)
- * Club domestic league appearances and goals as of 17:11, 30 June 2026 (UTC)

Kamil Oziemczuk (born 29 March 1988) is a Polish professional footballer who plays as a striker for regional league club Cisowianka Drzewce.

== Club career ==
Oziemczuk began his career at Górnik Łęczna before moving to AJ Auxerre in June 2006. In September 2008, he joined Motor Lublin.

== International career ==
He appeared at the 2006 UEFA European U-19 Championship.

== Honours ==
Motor Lublin

- Polish Cup (Lublin subdistrict regionals): 2016–17

Hetman Zamość

- IV liga Lublin: 2018–19
- Polish Cup (Zamość regionals): 2018–19
