= Ahmed Yahiaoui =

French footballer (born 1987)

Personal information
- Date of birth: 12 January 1987 (age 39)
- Place of birth: Marseille, France
- Height: 1.77 m (5 ft 10 in)
- Position: Midfielder

Youth career
- 1994–2004: Marseille

Senior career*
Years	Team	Apps	(Gls)
2004–2005	Marseille	5	(0)
2005–2006	Istres	16	(0)
2006–2007	Sion	1	(0)
2008	Cannes	2	(0)
2011–2012	GS Consolat	16	(0)
2012–2013	Sedan	5	(0)
2013	MC Oran		
2014	MC Alger		
2014–2015	Martigues	8	(0)

International career
2002–2003	France U16		
2003–2004	France U17		
2004–2005	France U18		
Medal record
Men's football
Representing France
UEFA European Under-17 Championship
Winner	2004 France
- * Club domestic league appearances and goals

Ahmed Yahiaoui (born 12 January 1987) is a French former professional footballer who played as a midfielder.

== Club career ==
Whilst at Olympique de Marseille, Yahiaoui was a target for Chelsea F.C. but the club was unsuccessful in its attempts to signing him, as Marseille had persuaded him to stay with the squad. At the beginning of his career, Yahiaoui played for France U17. However, he failed to make an impact at Marseille, in contrast to his teammate Samir Nasri. He left the squad to play one year for the Ligue 2 side FC Istres, before joining FC Sion, from where he was released at the beginning of 2007.

Yahiaoui an unsuccessful week-long trial with Everton F.C. in an attempt to secure a permanent deal as David Moyes was looking to strengthen his squad before the start of the 2007–08 Premier League season. He signed a contract for a year and a half with AS Cannes in December 2007 on a free transfer.

== Honours ==
France

- UEFA European Under-17 Football Championship: 2004
