= Karim El Mourabet =

French footballer (born 1987)

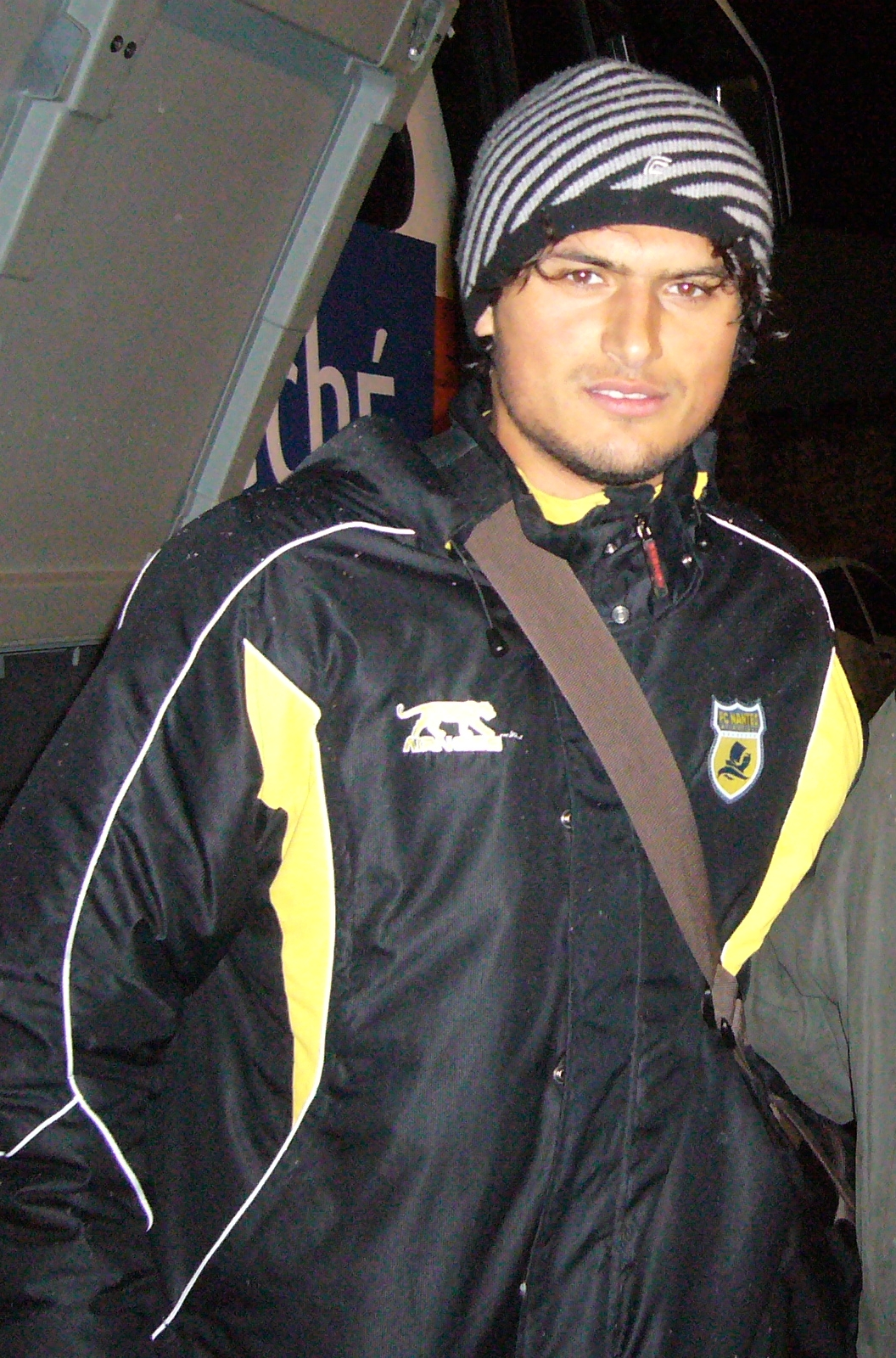

Personal information
- Full name: Abdelkarim El Mourabet
- Date of birth: April 30, 1987 (age 39)
- Place of birth: Orléans, France
- Height: 1.88 m (6 ft 2 in)
- Position: Defender

Youth career
- 1994–1998: Saint-Jean-le-Blanc
- 1998–2001: Orléans
- 2001–2002: Déolois
- 2002–2005: Nantes

Senior career*
| Years | Team | Apps | (Gls) |
| 2005–2010 | Nantes | 33 | (0) |
| 2007–2008 | → Stade Lavallois (loan) | 17 | (0) |
| 2011–2013 | Lille (reserves) | | |
| 2013–2014 | FUS de Rabat | | |
| 2015 | Olympic Club de Safi | | |

International career
| 2004–2007 | France U19 | | |
| 2007 | France U21 | 1 | (0) |
Medal record
Men's football
Representing France
UEFA European Under-17 Championship
| Winner | 2004 France |
- * Club domestic league appearances and goals

Abdelkarim El Mourabet (Arabic: كريم المرابت) (born 30 April 1987) is a French former footballer who played as a defender.

== Early life ==
He was born in France to a Moroccan family.

== International career ==
El Mourabet won the 2004 UEFA European Under-17 Championship with France. He made his France under-21 team debut against Sweden under-21 team, on November 14, 2006.

He was called up to the Morocco national football team in 2007 for a match against Ghana but did not appear.
