= Güven Güneri =

Turkish footballer

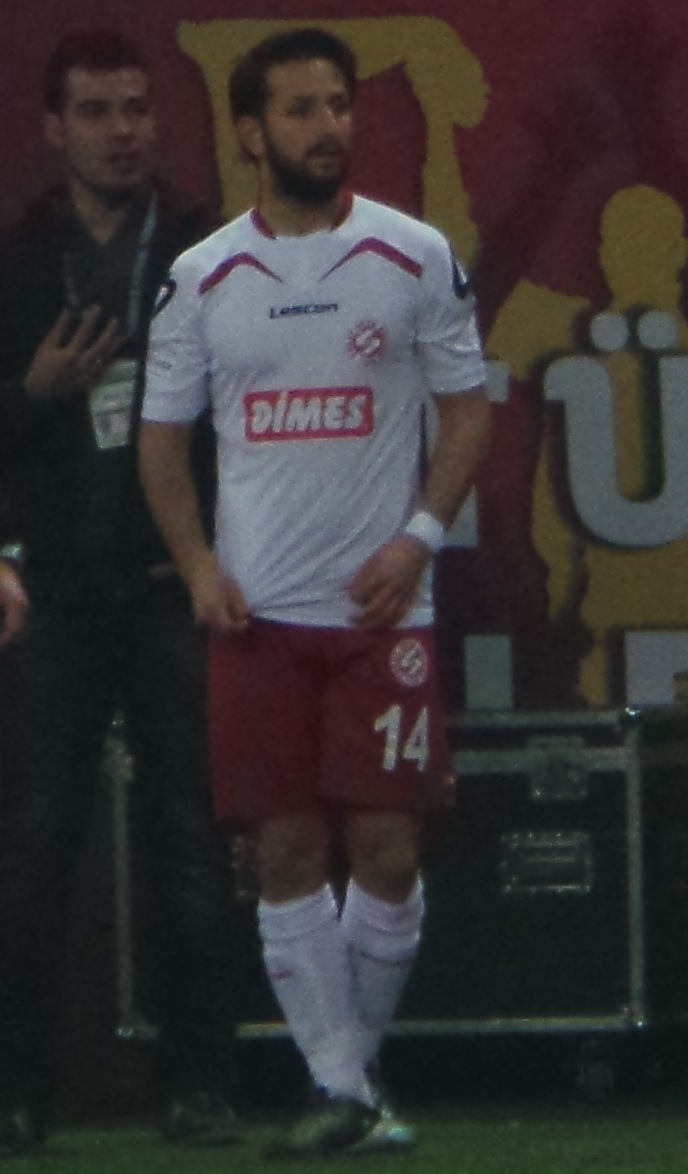

Personal information
- Date of birth: September 22, 1987 (age 39)
- Place of birth: Istanbul, Turkey
- Height: 1.82 m (5 ft 11 1/2 in)
- Position: Midfielder

Team information
- Current team: Belediye Kütahyaspor

Youth career
- Fenerbahçe

Senior career*
Years	Team	Apps	(Gls)
2006–2010	Fenerbahçe	0	(0)
2007	→ Kartalspor (loan)	18	(4)
2008	→ Zonguldakspor (loan)	13	(5)
2008	→ Maltepespor (loan)	2	(0)
2009	→ Beykozspor 1908 (loan)	16	(0)
2010	→ Şanlıurfa Belediyespor (loan)	10	(2)
2010	Akademik Sofia	6	(0)
2011	İnegölspor	15	(1)
2011–2012	Karabükspor		
2012	→ İnegölspor (loan)	6	(0)
2012–2013	Zonguldak Kömürspor		
2013	Eyüpspor	5	(0)
2014	Tokatspor	9	(0)
2014–2015	Tatvan Gençlerbirliği		
2015–2016	Gebzespor		
2016	Çorluspor		
2017	Serhat Ardahanspor		
2017–2018	Serik Belediyespor		
2018	Mersin İdman Yurdu	13	(11)
2019	Görelespor	10	(5)
2019–2020	Serik Belediyespor	25	(6)
2020–	Belediye Kütahyaspor	0	(0)

International career
2003–2004	Turkey U17		
2005	Turkey U19		
- * Club domestic league appearances and goals as of 18 March 2020

Güven Güneri (born September 22, 1987) is a Turkish footballer who plays for Belediye Kütahyaspor.
