= Paulo Renato (footballer) =

Portuguese footballer (born 1987)

Personal information
- Full name: Paulo Renato Valério Calado Rodrigues
- Date of birth: 14 May 1987 (age 39)
- Place of birth: Alcácer do Sal, Portugal
- Height: 1.83 m (6 ft 0 in)
- Position: Centre-back

Youth career
- 1996–2000: Pelezinhos
- 2000–2006: Sporting CP

Senior career*
Years	Team	Apps	(Gls)
2006–2010	Sporting CP	0	(0)
2006–2007	→ Real Massamá (loan)	24	(2)
2008–2009	→ Olhanense (loan)	1	(0)
2009–2010	→ Estrela Amadora (loan)	29	(1)
2010–2011	Olhanense	0	(0)
2011	→ Mafra (loan)	7	(0)
2011–2012	Trofense	1	(0)
2012–2013	Atlético	24	(0)
2013–2014	Oliveirense	22	(1)
2014	Quarteirense	2	(0)
2014–2015	Operário	13	(0)
2015	San Jose Earthquakes	5	(0)
2016–2018	Operário	35	(2)
2018	Alcacerense		
Total		163	(6)

International career
2006–2007	Portugal U20	14	(0)
2007	Portugal U21	1	(0)
- * Club domestic league appearances and goals

Paulo Renato Valério Calado Rodrigues (born 14 May 1987), known as Renato, is a Portuguese former professional footballer who played as a central defender.

== Club career ==
Born in Alcácer do Sal, Renato was promoted from Sporting CP's famed youth academy in 2007–08, after having spent his first senior year at lowly Real S.C. on loan. At the end of the season he was loaned again, to Segunda Liga side S.C. Olhanense, returning to Sporting in June 2009.

In the summer of 2009 yet another loan for Renato befell, now to C.F. Estrela da Amadora; the Lisbon-based club had just finished in mid-table in the Primeira Liga, but was relegated to the third division due to irregularities. He subsequently returned to Olhanense, with the Algarve team now in the top flight.

From 2010 to 2015, Renato alternated between the second and third tiers, representing no fewer than six clubs. On 26 February 2015 he moved abroad for the first time, signing with Major League Soccer side San Jose Earthquakes. He made his debut in top-division football on 7 March at the age of 27, featuring 90 minutes in a 1–0 away loss against FC Dallas.

== International career ==
Renato participated in the 2007 FIFA U-20 World Cup, playing all the matches and minutes as Portugal exited in the round of 16.
