= Paul Bichelhuber =

Austrian footballer (born 1987)

Personal information
- Full name: Paul Bichelhuber
- Date of birth: February 22, 1987 (age 39)
- Place of birth: Austria
- Height: 1.79 m (5 ft 10 1/2 in)
- Position: Midfielder

Youth career
- 1993–1999: Post SV Wien
- 1999–2004: Rapid Wien

Senior career*
Years	Team	Apps	(Gls)
2004–2007	Rapid Wien II	65	(13)
2007–2009	Austria Wien II	47	(4)
2009–2010	LASK	12	(0)
2010–2011	Admira Wacker	31	(14)
2011–2012	FAC TfW	38	(4)
2013–2014	First Vienna		
2014	Marchfeld Donauauen		
2015	ASK Kottingbrunn		
2015–2016	SV Leobendorf		
2016–2019	1.FC Bisamberg		
- * Club domestic league appearances and goals

Paul Bichelhuber (born February 22, 1987, in Wien) is a retired Austrian professional association football player who played as an attacking midfield.
