= 2009–10 AJ Auxerre season =

Auxerre
2009–10 season
- President: Alain Dujon
- Head coach: Jean Fernandez
- Stadium: Stade de l'Abbé-Deschamps
- Ligue 1: 3rd
- Coupe de France: Quarter-finals
- Coupe de la Ligue: Third round
- Top goalscorer: League: Ireneusz Jelen (14); All: Ireneusz Jelen (18)
- Average home league attendance: 11,306
- Biggest defeat: Marseille 6–0 Auxerre
| Home colours | Away colours | Third colours |

The 2009–10 season was the 104th season in the existence of AJ Auxerre and the club's 30th consecutive season in the top-flight of French football. In addition to the domestic league, Auxerre participated in this season's editions of the Coupe de France and Coupe de la Ligue.

== Pre-season and friendlies ==
Win Draw Loss

== Competitions ==
=== Overall record ===
| Competition | First match | Last match | Starting round | Final position | Record | | | | | | | |
| Competition | First match | Last match | Starting round | Final position | Pld | W | D | L | GF | GA | GD | Win % |
|---|---|---|---|---|---|---|---|---|---|---|---|---|
| Ligue 1 | 8 August 2009 | 15 May 2010 | Matchday 1 | 2nd | 38 | 20 | 11 | 7 | 42 | 29 | +13 | 52.63 |
| Coupe de France | 9 January 2010 | 23 March 2010 | Round of 64 | Quarter-finals | 4 | 2 | 2 | 0 | 6 | 1 | +5 | 50.00 |
| Coupe de la Ligue | 23 September 2009 | | Third round | Third round | 1 | 0 | 0 | 1 | 1 | 3 | −2 | 0.00 |
| Total | | | | | 43 | 22 | 13 | 8 | 49 | 33 | +16 | 51.16 |

Source: Competitions

=== Ligue 1 ===
==== League table ====
| Pos | Team | Pld | W | D | L | GF | GA | GD | Pts | Qualification or relegation |
|---|---|---|---|---|---|---|---|---|---|---|
| 1 | Marseille (C) | 38 | 23 | 9 | 6 | 69 | 36 | +33 | 78 | Qualification to Champions League group stage |
| 2 | Lyon | 38 | 20 | 12 | 6 | 64 | 38 | +26 | 72 | Qualification to Champions League group stage |
| 3 | Auxerre | 38 | 20 | 11 | 7 | 42 | 29 | +13 | 71 | Qualification to Champions League play-off round |
| 4 | Lille | 38 | 21 | 7 | 10 | 72 | 40 | +32 | 70 | Qualification to Europa League play-off round (Note: Coupe de France winners Paris Saint-Germain qualify for the 2010–11 UEFA Europa League Play-off round of 2010–11 UEFA Europa League.) |
| 5 | Montpellier | 38 | 20 | 9 | 9 | 50 | 40 | +10 | 69 | Qualification to Europa League third qualifying round (Note: Coupe de la Ligue winners Marseille finished as champions, fulfilling a finish of at least 4th place, thus their Europa League Third qualifying round berth will go to the 5th placed team in the league.) |

Source: Ligue 1
Rules for classification: 1) points; 2) goal difference; 3) number of goals scored.
(C) Champions

==== Results summary ====
| Overall | | | | | | | | Home | | | | | | Away | | | | | |
| Pld | W | D | L | GF | GA | GD | Pts | W | D | L | GF | GA | GD | W | D | L | GF | GA | GD |
|---|---|---|---|---|---|---|---|---|---|---|---|---|---|---|---|---|---|---|---|
| 38 | 20 | 11 | 7 | 42 | 29 | +13 | 71 | 11 | 5 | 3 | 24 | 14 | +10 | 9 | 6 | 4 | 18 | 15 | +3 |

Source: Ligue 1

==== Results by round ====
| Round | 1 | 2 | 3 | 4 | 5 | 6 | 7 | 8 | 9 | 10 | 11 | 12 | 13 | 14 | 15 | 16 | 17 | 18 | 19 | 20 | 21 | 22 | 23 | 24 | 25 | 26 | 27 | 28 | 29 | 30 | 31 | 32 | 33 | 34 | 35 | 36 | 37 | 38 |
|---|---|---|---|---|---|---|---|---|---|---|---|---|---|---|---|---|---|---|---|---|---|---|---|---|---|---|---|---|---|---|---|---|---|---|---|---|---|---|
| Ground | H | A | H | A | H | A | H | A | H | H | A | H | A | H | A | H | A | H | A | H | A | H | A | H | A | A | H | A | H | A | H | A | H | A | H | A | H | A |
| Result | L | L | L | D | W | D | W | W | W | W | D | W | W | W | L | L | D | D | W | D | W | W | L | W | W | W | W | D | W | D | D | W | W | W | D | L | D | W |
| Position | 15 | 19 | 20 | 19 | 17 | 16 | 12 | 10 | 7 | 7 | 6 | 3 | 6 | 3 | 6 | 6 | 7 | 8 | 5 | 7 | 7 | 7 | 7 | 6 | 6 | 5 | 4 | 4 | 4 | 4 | 4 | 2 | 2 | 2 | 2 | 4 | 4 | 3 |

Source: Ligue 1
A = Away; H = Home; W = Win; D = Draw; L = Loss

==== Matches ====
The league fixtures were announced on 5 June 2009.

| 8 August 2009 1 | Auxerre | 0–1 | Sochaux | Auxerre |
| 21:00 CEST (UTC+2) | | Report | | Stadium: Stade de l'Abbé-Deschamps |

| 15 August 2009 2 | Lens | 2–0 | Auxerre | Lens |
| 19:00 CEST (UTC+2) | | Report | | Stadium: Stade Bollaert-Delelis |

| 22 August 2009 3 | Auxerre | 0–3 | Lyon | Auxerre |
| 19:00 CEST (UTC+2) | | Report | | Stadium: Stade de l'Abbé-Deschamps |

| 29 August 2009 4 | Boulogne | 0–0 | Auxerre | Boulogne-sur-Mer |
| 19:00 CEST (UTC+2) | | Report | | Stadium: Stade de la Libération |

| 13 September 2009 5 | Auxerre | 2–0 | Nice | Auxerre |
| 17:00 CEST (UTC+2) | | Report | | Stadium: Stade de l'Abbé-Deschamps |

| 19 September 2009 6 | Saint-Étienne | 1–1 | Auxerre | Saint-Étienne |
| 19:00 CEST (UTC+2) | | Report | | Stadium: Stade Geoffroy-Guichard |

| 26 September 2009 7 | Auxerre | 2–0 | Grenoble | Auxerre |
| 19:00 CEST (UTC+2) | | | | Stadium: Stade de l'Abbé-Deschamps |

| 3 October 2009 8 | Rennes | 0–1 | Auxerre | Rennes |
| 19:00 CEST (UTC+2) | | | | Stadium: Stade de la Route de Lorient |

| 17 October 2009 9 | Auxerre | 1–0 | Bordeaux | Auxerre |
| 19:00 CEST (UTC+2) | | | | Stadium: Stade de l'Abbé-Deschamps |

| 25 October 2009 10 | Auxerre | 3–2 | Lille | Auxerre |
| 17:00 CEST (UTC+2) | | | | Stadium: Stade de l'Abbé-Deschamps |

| 31 October 2009 12 | Auxerre | 2–1 | Montpellier | Auxerre |
| 19:00 CET (UTC+1) | | | | Stadium: Stade de l'Abbé-Deschamps |

| 7 November 2009 13 | Le Mans | 0–1 | Auxerre | Le Mans |
| 19:00 CET (UTC+1) | | | | Stadium: Stade Léon-Bollée |

| 21 November 2009 14 | Auxerre | 2–0 | Monaco | Auxerre |
| 21:00 CET (UTC+1) | | | | Stadium: Stade de l'Abbé-Deschamps |

| 28 November 2009 15 | Paris Saint-Germain | 1–0 | Auxerre | Paris |
| 19:00 CEST (UTC+2) | | | | Stadium: Parc des Princes |

| 6 December 2009 16 | Auxerre | 1–3 | Nancy | Auxerre |
| 17:00 CET (UTC+1) | | | | Stadium: Stade de l'Abbé-Deschamps |

| 12 December 2009 17 | Lorient | 0–0 | Auxerre | Lorient |
| 21:00 CET (UTC+1) | | | | Stadium: Stade du Moustoir |

| 15 December 2009 11 | Valenciennes | 0–0 | Auxerre | Valenciennes |
| 21:00 CET (UTC+1) | | | | Stadium: Stade du Hainaut |

| 20 December 2009 18 | Auxerre | 1–1 | Toulouse | Auxerre |
| 17:00 CET (UTC+1) | | | | Stadium: Stade de l'Abbé-Deschamps |

| 23 December 2009 19 | Marseille | 6–0 | Auxerre | Marseille |
| 19:00 CET (UTC+1) | | | | Stadium: Stade Vélodrome |

| 16 January 2010 20 | Auxerre | 0–0 | Boulogne | Auxerre |
| 21:00 CET (UTC+1) | | | | Stadium: Stade de l'Abbé-Deschamps |

| 20 January 2010 21 | Nice | 0–1 | Auxerre | Nice |
| 19:00 CET (UTC+1) | | | | Stadium: Stade du Ray |

| 31 January 2010 22 | Auxerre | 1–0 | Saint-Étienne | Auxerre |
| 17:00 CET (UTC+1) | | Report | | Stadium: Stade de l'Abbé-Deschamps |

| 6 February 2010 23 | Grenoble | 0–5 | Auxerre | Grenoble |
| 19:00 CET (UTC+1) | | | | Stadium: Stade des Alpes |

| 14 February 2010 24 | Auxerre | 1–0 | Rennes | Auxerre |
| 17:00 CET (UTC+1) | | Report | | Stadium: Stade de l'Abbé-Deschamps |

| 28 February 2010 26 | Lille | 1–2 | Auxerre | Villeneuve-d'Ascq |
| 17:00 CET (UTC+1) | | Report | | Stadium: Stadium Lille Métropole |

| 6 March 2010 27 | Auxerre | 1–0 | Valenciennes | Auxerre |
| 19:00 CET (UTC+1) | | Report | | Stadium: Stade de l'Abbé-Deschamps |

| 10 March 2010 25 | Bordeaux | 1–2 | Auxerre | Bordeaux |
| 19:00 CET (UTC+1) | | Report | | Stadium: Stade Chaban-Delmas |

| 13 March 2010 28 | Montpellier | 1–1 | Auxerre | Montpellier |
| 19:00 CET (UTC+1) | | Report | | Stadium: Stade de la Mosson |

| 20 March 2010 29 | Auxerre | 2–1 | Le Mans | Auxerre |
| 19:00 CET (UTC+1) | | Report | | Stadium: Stade de l'Abbé-Deschamps |

| 29 March 2010 30 | Monaco | 0–0 | Auxerre | Monaco |
| 21:00 CEST (UTC+2) | | Report | | Stadium: Stade Luis II |

| 4 April 2010 31 | Auxerre | 1–1 | Paris Saint-Germain | Auxerre |
| 21:00 CEST (UTC+2) | | Report | | Stadium: Stade de l'Abbé-Deschamps |

| 11 April 2010 32 | Nancy | 0–1 | Auxerre | Tomblaine |
| 17:00 CEST (UTC+2) | | Report | | Stadium: Stade Marcel Picot |

| 17 April 2010 33 | Auxerre | 4–1 | Lorient | Auxerre |
| 19:00 CEST (UTC+2) | | Report | | Stadium: Stade de l'Abbé-Deschamps |

| 25 April 2010 34 | Toulouse | 0–3 | Auxerre | Toulouse |
| 17:00 CEST (UTC+2) | | Report | | Stadium: Stadium de Toulouse |

| 30 April 2010 35 | Auxerre | 0–0 | Marseille | Auxerre |
| 21:00 CEST (UTC+2) | | Report | | Stadium: Stade de l'Abbé-Deschamps |

| 5 May 2010 36 | Lyon | 2–1 | Auxerre | Lyon |
| 19:00 CEST (UTC+2) | | Report | | Stadium: Stade de Gerland |

| 8 May 2010 37 | Auxerre | 0–0 | Lens | Auxerre |
| 21:00 CEST (UTC+2) | | Report | | Stadium: Stade de l'Abbé-Deschamps |

| 15 May 2010 38 | Sochaux | 1–2 | Auxerre | Sochaux |
| 21:00 CEST (UTC+2) | | Report | | Stadium: Stade Auguste Bonal |

=== Coupe de France ===
| 11 January 2010 Round of 64 | Amiens | 0–1 | Auxerre | Amiens |
| 20:30 CET (UTC+1) | | | Hengbart 46' | Stadium: Stade de la Licorne; Attendance: 2,600; Referee: Laurent Duhamel |

| 26 January 2010 Round of 32 | Auxerre | 1–1 (a.e.t.) (3–0 p) | Sedan | Auxerre |
| 19:00 CET (UTC+1) | | | | Stadium: Stade de l'Abbé-Deschamps; Attendance: 2,287; Referee: Lionel Jaffredo |

| 10 February 2010 Round of 16 | Auxerre | 4–0 | Plabennec | Auxerre |
| 19:00 CET (UTC+1) | | | | Stadium: Stade de l'Abbé-Deschamps; Attendance: 3,516; Referee: Philippe Malige |

| 23 March 2010 Quarter-finals | Auxerre | 0–0 (a.e.t.) (5–6 p) | Paris Saint-Germain | Auxerre |
| 20:45 CET (UTC+1) | | | | Stadium: Stade de l'Abbé-Deschamps; Attendance: 0 |
Note: It was played behind closed doors.

=== Coupe de la Ligue ===
| 23 September 2009 Third round | Sedan | 3–1 | Auxerre | Sedan |
| 20:45 CEST (UTC+2) | Allart 10'; Tibéri 67'; Lasimant 90+2' | | Mignot 60' | Stadium: Stade Louis Dugauguez; Attendance: 5,811; Referee: Pascal Vileo |
