= Cemil Tosun =

Austrian-Turkish footballer

Personal information
- Full name: Cemil Tosun
- Date of birth: 6 February 1987 (age 39)
- Place of birth: Vienna, Austria
- Height: 1.83 m (6 ft 0 in)
- Position: Midfielder

Team information
- Current team: Wiener SK

Youth career
- 1996–1998: Favoritner AC
- 1998–2001: First Vienna FC

Senior career*
| Years | Team | Apps | (Gls) |
| 2005–2009 | Rapid Wien II | 36 | (2) |
| 2005–2007 | SK Rapid Wien | 3 | (0) |
| 2008–2009 | → DSV Leoben | 19 | (2) |
| 2009 | FK Dunajská Streda | 14 | (0) |
| 2010– | Wiener SK | | |
- * Club domestic league appearances and goals as of 3 August 2009

Cemil Tosun (born 6 February 1987 in Vienna) is an Austrian-Turkish footballer currently playing for Wiener SK.
