= Amara Morikè Kallé =

Malian footballer

Amara Kallé
Personal information
- Full name: Amara Dit Morikè Kallé
- Date of birth: 19 September 1990 (age 36)
- Place of birth: Bamako, Mali
- Height: 1.84 m (6 ft 1/2 in)
- Position: Central defender

Team information
- Current team: AJ Auxerre
- Number: 28

Senior career*
Years	Team	Apps	(Gls)
2007–2008	AS Real Bamako	12	(0)
2008–2009	Auxerre B	20	(1)
2009–	AJ Auxerre	0	(0)

International career
2007–2008	Mali U-20	4	(0)
2009–	Mali	1	(0)
- * Club domestic league appearances and goals

Amara Dit Morikè Kallé (born 19 September 1990 in Bamako) is a Malian football (soccer) defender, who plays for AJ Auxerre.

== Career ==
Kallé began his career with AS Real Bamako and was in July 2008 transferred to AJ Auxerre.

== International career ==
He earned his first full senior national cap for the Mali national football team in 2009 and was formerly member with the team at the Tournoi de l'UEMOA 2007.
