= Ruslan Zanevskyi =

Ukrainian footballer

Personal information
- Full name: Ruslan Volodymyrovych Zanevskyi
- Date of birth: 27 November 1987 (age 38)
- Place of birth: Odesa, Ukrainian SSR
- Height: 1.74 m (5 ft 8 1/2 in)
- Position: Midfielder

Youth career
- 2000–2001: Junga Chorne More Odesa
- 2001–2004: FC Shakhtar Donetsk

Senior career*
Years	Team	Apps	(Gls)
2004–2005	Shakhtar Donetsk	0	(0)
2005	Shakhtar-3 Donetsk	5	(1)
2005	Shakhtar-2 Donetsk	3	(0)
2006	Nuorese Calcio	?	(?)
2006	Ditton Daugavpils	1	(0)
2007	R. Charleroi S.C.	1	(0)
2007–2008	FF Jaro	1	(0)
2008	Jakobstads BK	17	(2)
2011	FC Poltava	0	(0)

International career
2002–2004	Ukraine-17	5	(0)
2004–2005	Ukraine-19	19	(0)
- * Club domestic league appearances and goals as of 25 February 2016

Ruslan Volodymyrovych Zanevskyi (Ukrainian: Руслан Володимирович Заневський; born 27 November 1987 in Odesa, Ukrainian SSR) is a professional Ukrainian football offensive midfielder.

== Career ==
Tkachuk is the product of Junga Chorne More Odesa and FC Shakhtar Donetsk Youth Sportive School. Zanevsky began his career in 2004 for the Shakhtar Donetsk. In the end of 2005, by mutual consent he canceled the contract with Donetsk club and then training together with the reserve team players AC Milan, then in 2006 he was sent into Serie D farm club Nuorese Calcio. Then he played in clubs Ditton Daugavpils, R. Charleroi S.C., FF Jaro, Jakobstads BK and FC Poltava.

== International career ==
He played for the Ukraine national under-17 football team and Ukraine national under-19 football team.
