= Daniel Gramann =

Austrian footballer

Personal information
- Full name: Daniel Gramann
- Date of birth: January 6, 1987 (age 39)
- Place of birth: Vienna, Austria
- Height: 1.90 m (6 ft 3 in)
- Position: Defender

Senior career*
| Years | Team | Apps | (Gls) |
| 2004–2006 | VfB Admira Wacker Mödling | 2 | (0) |
| 2006–2007 | TSV Hartberg | 20 | (1) |
| 2007–2009 | SC Rheindorf Altach | 35 | (1) |
| 2009–2010 | SK Austria Kärnten | 18 | (2) |

International career^{‡}
| 2007 | Austria U-20 | 10 | (0) |
- * Club domestic league appearances and goals as of 9 May 2010 ‡ National team caps and goals as of 02:12, 29 July 2009 (UTC)

Daniel Gramann (born 6 January 1987) is an Austrian football defender.

== Biography ==
Gramann was born in Vienna, and is the son of former federal league player and ex-ÖFB Secretary General Wolfgang Gramann.

== Club career ==
Gramann began his career at VfB Admira Wacker Mödling, spending two years at the Mödling based club and playing in only a handful of games before moving on to TSV Hartberg. A year later, Gramann transferred to SC Rheindorf Altach. In 2009, Gramann was again on the move, this time to Austrian Bundesliga side SK Austria Kärnten where he stayed until June 2010 when the club went defunct.

== International career ==
In 2007, Gramann played for Austria in the FIFA Under 20 World Cup, making it to the semi-finals before being eliminated by Czech Republic. They were defeated in the third place playoff by Chile.
