= Shane Paul =

English footballer

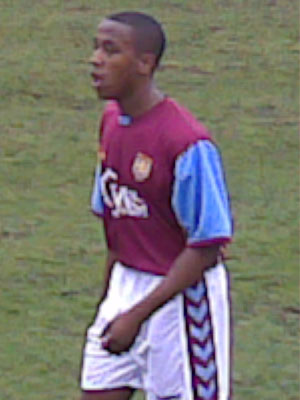
- Paul with Aston Villa

Personal information
- Date of birth: 25 January 1987 (age 39)
- Place of birth: Walsall, England
- Height: 1.71 m (5 ft 7 in)
- Position: Striker

Youth career
- 2002–2003: Aston Villa

Senior career*
Years	Team	Apps	(Gls)
2003–2006	Aston Villa	0	(0)
2006	Scunthorpe United	0	(0)
2006–2007	Cheltenham Town	0	(0)
2007–2008	Halesowen Town		

International career^{‡}
2002–2003	England U16	4	(2)
2003–2004	England U17	10	(9)
2004	England U18	1	(0)
- * Club domestic league appearances and goals as of 19:12, 7 January 2006 (UTC) ‡ National team caps and goals as of 12:47, 7 February 2012 (UTC)

Shane Paul (born 25 January 1987 in Walsall) is an English footballer who last played for Halesowen Town in 2008.

Paul, a former Aston Villa trainee, has represented England at U16, U17 and U18 level. Also, Paul became professional in January 2004.

He left Aston Villa in 2006 after forging a name for himself on the youth international scene, representing England at various tournaments. Paul's talents led him to be named top goalscorer in the 2003–04 UEFA Under-17 European Championships- and although a promising football career seemed likely he was hampered by injury, joining Scunthorpe United after a trial period at Wycombe Wanderers. Paul signed a short-term contract with Cheltenham Town after joining the League One side on trial in October 2007. Paul was making good progress in the 2007–08 season with Halesowen Town until breaking his leg in two places in the early stages of a game against Banbury United. At the time, it was not known if he would be able to play football again.
