= Rui Gomes (footballer, born 1987) =

Portuguese footballer

Personal information
- Full name: Rui Daniel Morais Gomes
- Date of birth: 27 March 1987 (age 39)
- Place of birth: Sandim, Portugal
- Height: 1.80 m (5 ft 11 in)
- Position: Midfielder

Team information
- Current team: Dragões Sandinenses

Youth career
- 2000–2006: Boavista

Senior career*
Years	Team	Apps	(Gls)
2006–2007	Boavista	0	(0)
2006–2007	→ Dragões Sandinenses (loan)	22	(1)
2007–2009	Espinho	41	(0)
2009–2011	Eléctrico	58	(5)
2011–2012	Coimbrões	29	(5)
2012–2013	Arouca	12	(0)
2013–2014	Boavista	13	(0)
2014–2015	Cesarense	23	(4)
2015	Trofense	7	(0)
2015–2016	Praiense	25	(1)
2017–	Gondomar	1	(0)
- * Club domestic league appearances and goals as of 19 March 2017

Rui Daniel Morais Gomes (born 27 March 1987) is a Portuguese professional footballer who plays for Dragões Sandinenses as an attacking midfielder.
