= Roman Dorosh =

Ukrainian football midfielder

Personal information
- Full name: Roman Ihorovych Dorosh
- Date of birth: 1 January 1987 (age 39)
- Place of birth: Kyiv, Ukrainian SSR
- Height: 1.80 m (5 ft 11 in)
- Position: Midfielder

Team information
- Current team: FC Ternopil

Youth career
- 1996–2001: FC Dynamo Kyiv
- 2001–2002: FC Zmina-Obolon Kyiv
- 2002–2003: FC Kyiv-Skhid Kyiv

Senior career*
Years	Team	Apps	(Gls)
2005–2007	FC Nafkom Brovary	38	(7)
2008–2009	FC Obolon-2 Kyiv	11	(0)
2010–2013	FC Bukovyna Chernivtsi	107	(6)
2013–2014	FC Olimpik Donetsk	9	(0)
2014–2016	FC Hirnyk Kryvyi Rih	47	(0)
2016–2017	FC Bukovyna Chernivtsi	10	(0)
2017	FC Ternopil	3	(0)

International career
2002–2003	Ukraine-16	15	(1)
2003–2004	Ukraine-17	12	(1)
2003	Ukraine-18	1	(0)
- * Club domestic league appearances and goals as of 11 April 2017 (UTC)

Roman Dorosh (Ukrainian: Роман Ігорович Дорош; born 1 January 1987) is a Ukrainian former football midfielder.

== Career ==
Dorosh is a product of the Dynamo Kyiv youth sportive school and spent time playing for different Ukrainian teams. In July 2013 he signed a contract with FC Olimpik Donetsk.
