= Jean Fernandez =

French footballer (born 1954)

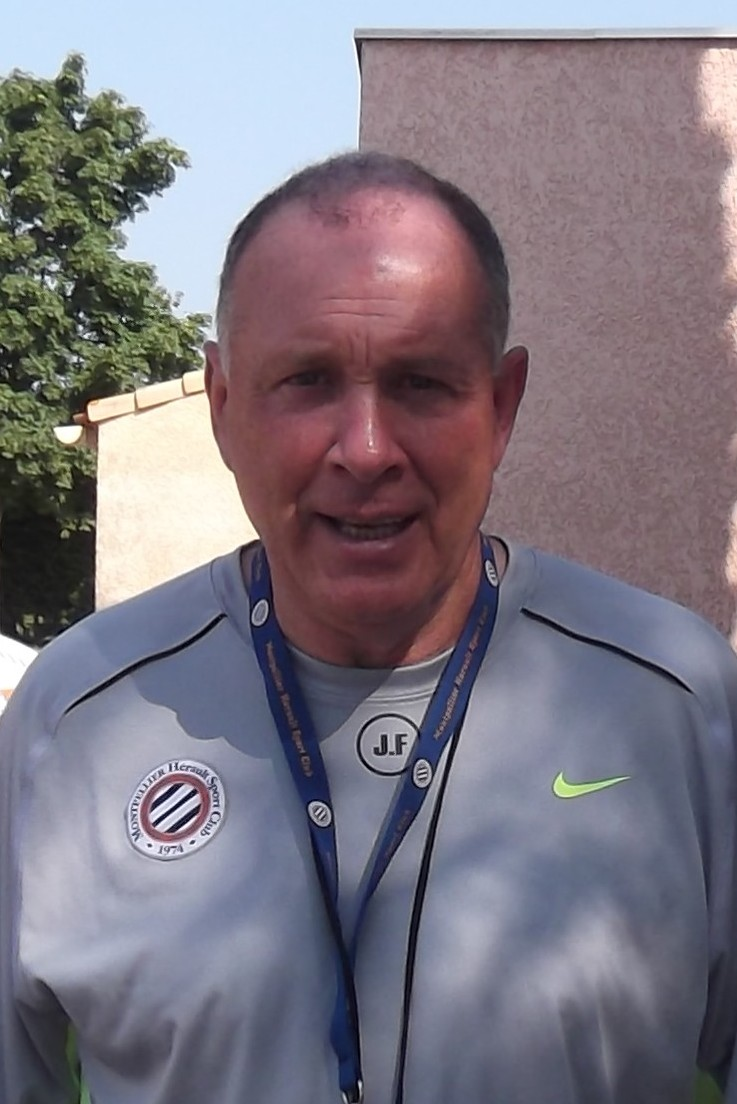
- Fernandez as Montpellier manager in 2013

Personal information
- Date of birth: 8 October 1954 (age 72)
- Place of birth: Mostaganem, French Algeria
- Height: 1.75 m (5 ft 9 in)
- Position: Midfielder

Senior career*
Years	Team	Apps	(Gls)
1972–1975	Béziers	62	(0)
1975–1980	Marseille	165	(1)
1980–1982	Bordeaux	85	(2)
1982–1984	Cannes	59	(1)
Total		371	(4)

Managerial career
- 1985–1990: Cannes
- 1990: Nice
- 1992: Marseille
- 1993–1994: Al-Nassr
- 1994–1995: Lille
- 1995–1996: Al-Nassr
- 1996–1997: Al-Shabab
- 1997: Al-Wahda
- 1998: Al-Nassr
- 1998–1999: Étoile du Sahel
- 1999–2002: Sochaux
- 2002–2005: Metz
- 2005–2006: Marseille
- 2006–2011: Auxerre
- 2011–2013: Nancy
- 2013–2015: Montpellier
- 2015–2017: Al-Khor
- 2017: Al-Gharafa
- * Club domestic league appearances and goals

Jean Fernandez (born 8 October 1954) is a French professional football manager and former player. He has previously managed Metz and Marseille, where France national team star Franck Ribéry saw him as a mentor. He managed Auxerre for five years, and was named as France's manager of the year in the 2009–10 season after guiding Auxerre into the UEFA Champions League. He managed Nancy for the 2011 season and half of the 2012 season. Jean Fernandez resigned from his position with Nancy before the end of the 2013 season on 10 January 2013. He became the new Montpellier manager on 1 July 2013, but departed on 5 December that year after a run of seven games without a win.

Fernandez was born in Mostaganem, French Algeria. He competed for France at the 1976 Summer Olympics.

== Honours ==
al nasser

- Saudi Pro League: 1993-1994

Marseille

- UEFA Intertoto Cup: 2005-2006

auxerre

- UEFA Intertoto Cup: 2006-2007
