= 1998–99 FC Metz season =

Metz
1998–99 season
- President: Carlo Molinari
- Head coach: Joël Müller
- Stadium: Stade Saint-Symphorien
- Division 1: 10th
- Coupe de France: Round of 16
- Coupe de la Ligue: Runners-up
- Champions League: Second qualifying round
- UEFA Cup: First round
- Top goalscorer: League: Bruno Rodriguez (6); All: Nenad Jestrović (9)
- Highest home attendance: 23,470 vs Le Havre (29 May 1999)
- Lowest home attendance: 2,500 vs HJK (26 August 1998)
- Average home league attendance: 17,395

The 1998–99 season was the 67th season in the existence of FC Metz and the club's 32nd consecutive season in the top-flight of French football. In addition to the domestic league, Metz participated in this season's editions of the Coupe de France, the Coupe de la Ligue, the UEFA Champions League and UEFA Cup.

== Season summary ==
Last season, Metz had only been denied their first ever French title by goal difference. This season, however, the club endured humiliating exits from the Champions League and the UEFA Cup and dropped down to 10th in the final table. The closest the club came to glory was reaching the Coupe de la Ligue final, but they were defeated 1-0 by Lens.

== Players ==
Squad at end of season

Note: Flags indicate national team as defined under FIFA eligibility rules; some limited exceptions apply. Players may hold more than one non-FIFA nationality.

No.	Pos.	Nation	Player
1	GK	FRA	Lionel Letizi
2	DF	FRA	Pascal Pierre
3	DF	FRA	Philippe Gaillot
4	DF	FRA	Sébastien Schemmel
5	DF	FRA	Sylvain Kastendeuch
6	FW	FRA	Christophe Horlaville
7	MF	FRA	Ludovic Asuar
8	MF	FRA	Franck Rizzetto
9	FW	YUG	Vladan Lukić
10	MF	FRA	Frédéric Meyrieu
11	FW	HUN	Mihály Tóth
12	MF	FRA	Grégory Proment
13	MF	FRA	Stéphane Rondelaere
14	DF	FRA	Geoffray Toyes

No.	Pos.	Nation	Player
15	FW	YUG	Nenad Jestrović
16	GK	FRA	André Biancarelli
17	MF	FRA	Franck Histilloles
18	DF	LUX	Jeff Strasser
19	MF	FRA	Stéphane Boulila
20	MF	FRA	Didier Neumann
22	FW	FRA	Younès Diani
25	MF	BEL	Danny Boffin
26	DF	USA	David Regis (Note: Regis was born in La Trinité, Martinique, but also qualified to represent the United States internationally as his wife was an American citizen and made his international debut for the United States in May 1998.)
27	FW	FRA	Jonathan Jäger
28	MF	BEL	Gunter van Handenhoven
29	MF	ALG	Nasreddine Kraouche (Note: Kraouche was born in Thionville, France, but also qualified to represent Algeria internationally and made his international debut for Algeria in 1999.)
30	GK	FRA	Jonathan Joubert (Note: Joubert was born in Metz, France, but also qualified to represent Luxembourg internationally and would make his international debut for Luxembourg in June 2006.)
32	DF	FRA	Sylvain Marchal

=== Left club during season ===
Note: Flags indicate national team as defined under FIFA eligibility rules; some limited exceptions apply. Players may hold more than one non-FIFA nationality.

No.	Pos.	Nation	Player
6	MF	FRA	Christophe Le Grix (on loan to Lorient)
21	FW	FRA	Bruno Rodriguez (to PSG)

No.	Pos.	Nation	Player
24	FW	FRA	Louis Saha (on loan to Newcastle United)
31	FW	TOG	Djima Oyawolé (on loan to ESTAC)

== Competitions ==
=== Overview ===
Competition	First match	Last match	Starting round	Final position	Record							
Competition	First match	Last match	Starting round	Final position	Pld	W	D	L	GF	GA	GD	Win %
French Division 1	7 August 1998	29 May 1999	Matchday 1	10th	34	9	12	13	28	37	−9	26.47
Coupe de France	23 January 1999	14 March 1999	Round of 64	Round of 16	3	2	0	1	4	3	+1	66.67
Coupe de la Ligue	9 January 1999	8 May 1999	Round of 32	Runners-up	5	3	1	1	10	7	+3	60.00
UEFA Champions League	12 August 1998	26 August 1998	Second qualifying round	Second qualifying round	2	0	1	1	1	2	−1	0.00
UEFA Cup	15 September 1998	29 September 1998	First round	First round	2	1	0	1	3	3	+0	50.00
Total					46	15	14	17	46	52	−6	32.61

Source: Competitions

=== Division 1 ===
==== League table ====
Pos	Team	Pld	W	D	L	GF	GA	GD	Pts	Qualification or relegation
8	Montpellier	34	11	10	13	53	50	+3	43	Qualification to Intertoto Cup second round
9	Paris Saint-Germain	34	10	9	15	34	35	−1	39	
10	Metz	34	9	12	13	28	37	−9	39	Qualification to Intertoto Cup second round
11	Nancy	34	10	9	15	35	45	−10	39	
12	Strasbourg	34	8	14	12	30	36	−6	38	

Source: Ligue 1
Rules for classification: 1) points; 2) goal difference; 3) number of goals scored.

==== Results summary ====
Overall								Home						Away					
Pld	W	D	L	GF	GA	GD	Pts	W	D	L	GF	GA	GD	W	D	L	GF	GA	GD
34	9	12	13	28	37	−9	39	9	4	4	23	12	+11	0	8	9	5	25	−20

Last updated: 29 May 1999.
Source: Competitive matches

==== Results by match ====
Match	1	2	3	4	5	6	7	8	9	10	11	12	13	14	15	16	17	18	19	20	21	22	23	24	25	26	27	28	29	30	31	32	33	34
Ground	A	H	A	H	A	H	A	H	A	H	A	H	A	H	A	H	H	A	H	A	H	A	H	A	H	A	H	A	H	A	H	A	H	A
Result	D	L	L	L	D	D	D	L	D	W	L	W	D	W	L	W	D	L	W	L	W	L	W	L	D	D	L	L	D	D	W	D	L	W
Position	10	15	17	17	17	16	16	17	17	16	17	15	15	13	14	14	14	14	13	13	12	12	12	13	11	11	13	14	14	14	12	12	13	10

A = Away; H = Home; W = Win; D = Draw; L = Loss
Notes: Match 24 versus Nancy was postponed until 9 April 1999 and therefore should appear between matches 28 & 29.

==== Matches ====
7 August 1998 1	Le Havre	0–0	Metz	Le Havre
18:30 CEST (UTC+2)		Report		Stadium: Stade Jules Deschaseaux; Attendance: 13,071; Referee: Rémy Harrel

15 August 1998 2	Metz	0–1	Marseille	Metz
20:00 CEST (UTC+2)		Report	Gourvennec 45'	Stadium: Stade Saint-Symphorien; Attendance: 23,000; Referee: Pascal Garibian

22 August 1998 3	Bastia	3–0	Metz	Furiani
20:00 CEST (UTC+2)	André 31'; Née 53'; Paulo Alves 87'	Report		Stadium: Stade Armand Cesari; Attendance: 7,000; Referee: Bruno Derrien

29 August 1998 4	Metz	0–2	Bordeaux	Metz
20:00 CEST (UTC+2)		Report	Kastendeuch 26' (o.g.); Wiltord 86'	Stadium: Stade Saint-Symphorien; Attendance: 14,459; Referee: Patrick Anton

11 September 1998 5	Strasbourg	0–0	Metz	Strasbourg
18:00 CEST (UTC+2)		Report		Stadium: Stade de la Meinau; Attendance: 16,745; Referee: Laurent Duhamel

19 September 1998 6	Metz	0–0	Toulouse	Metz
20:00 CEST (UTC+2)		Report		Stadium: Stade Saint-Symphorien; Attendance: 14,051; Referee: Philippe Kalt

25 September 1998 7	Lorient	1–1	Metz	Lorient
20:00 CEST (UTC+2)	Bouafia 77' (pen.)	Report	Jestrović 82'	Stadium: Stade du Moustoir; Attendance: 9,000; Referee: Claude Colombo

4 October 1998 8	Metz	2–3	Nancy	Metz
18:00 CEST (UTC+2)	Boffin 45'; Meyrieu 90' (pen.)	Report	Kone 16', 63'; Cascarino 60'	Stadium: Stade Saint-Symphorien; Attendance: 16,065; Referee: Bernard Saules

17 October 1998 9	Sochaux	1–1	Metz	Montbéliard
20:00 CEST (UTC+2)	Baudry 90'	Report	Lukić 51'	Stadium: Stade Auguste Bonal; Attendance: 6,500; Referee: Franck Glochon

24 October 1998 10	Metz	1–0	Monaco	Metz
20:00 CEST (UTC+2)	Rodriguez 31' (pen.)	Report	Dumas (red card) 90'	Stadium: Stade Saint-Symphorien; Attendance: 16,252; Referee: Stéphane Bré

30 October 1998 11	Lens	2–0	Metz	Lens
20:00 CET (UTC+1)	Nouma 42'; Debève 54'	Report		Stadium: Stade Félix-Bollaert; Attendance: 37,430; Referee: Rémy Harrel

7 November 1998 12	Metz	3–2	Lyon	Metz
20:00 CET (UTC+1)	Rodriguez 21', 29'; Toyes 45'	Report	Uras (red card) 19'; Cocard 44'; Kanouté 88'	Stadium: Stade Saint-Symphorien; Attendance: 13,564; Referee: Bruno Coué

11 November 1998 13	Paris Saint-Germain	2–2	Metz	Paris
20:00 CET (UTC+1)	Kastendeuch 67' (o.g.); Simone 69' (pen.)	Report	Meyrieu 31'; Rodriguez 80'	Stadium: Parc des Princes; Attendance: 42,989; Referee: Eric Poulat

14 November 1998 14	Metz	1–0	Nantes	Metz
20:00 CET (UTC+1)	Rodriguez 83'	Report		Stadium: Stade Saint-Symphorien; Attendance: 15,945; Referee: Bertrand Layec

20 November 1998 15	Auxerre	1–0	Metz	Auxerre
20:00 CET (UTC+1)	Klos 83'	Report		Stadium: Stade de l'Abbé-Deschamps; Attendance: 4,500; Referee: Gilles Veissière

28 November 1998 16	Metz	3–1	Montpellier	Metz
20:00 CET (UTC+1)	Rodriguez 45'; Lukić 55', 77'	Report	Pierre 48' (o.g.)	Stadium: Stade Saint-Symphorien; Attendance: 14,420; Referee: Serge Léon

4 December 1998 17	Metz	0–0	Rennes	Metz
20:00 CET (UTC+1)		Report		Stadium: Stade Saint-Symphorien; Attendance: 13,561; Referee: Pascal Garibian

12 December 1998 18	Marseille	3–0	Metz	Marseille
20:00 CET (UTC+1)	Camara 29'; Maurice 44'; Gourvennec 90'	Report		Stadium: Stade Vélodrome; Attendance: 46,377; Referee: Philippe Kalt

15 December 1998 19	Metz	4–0	Bastia	Metz
18:30 CET (UTC+1)	Jestrović 13', 58', 60'; Lukić 71'	Report		Stadium: Stade Saint-Symphorien; Attendance: 14,717; Referee: Laurent Duhamel

19 December 1998 20	Bordeaux	6–0	Metz	Bordeaux
20:00 CET (UTC+1)	Micoud 36', 90'; Wiltord 47'; Laslandes 52', 60', 74'; Saveljić (red card) 85'	Report	Rodriguez (red card) 85'	Stadium: Parc Lescure; Attendance: 22,447; Referee: Gilles Veissière

17 January 1999 21	Metz	1–0	Strasbourg	Metz
18:00 CET (UTC+1)	Boffin 90+1'	Report		Stadium: Stade Saint-Symphorien; Attendance: 18,214; Referee: Marc Batta

30 January 1999 22	Toulouse	1–0	Metz	Toulouse
20:00 CET (UTC+1)	Batlles 24'	Report		Stadium: Stadium de Toulouse; Attendance: 11,952; Referee: Patrick Anton

6 February 1999 23	Metz	3–0	Lorient	Metz
20:00 CET (UTC+1)	Meyrieu 34'; Boffin 35'; Horlaville 73'	Report		Stadium: Stade Saint-Symphorien; Attendance: 13,711; Referee: Bruno Ruffray

26 February 1999 25	Metz	1–1	Sochaux	Metz
20:00 CET (UTC+1)	Schemmel 42'	Report	Bouger 40'	Stadium: Stade Saint-Symphorien; Attendance: 15,663; Referee: Bruno Coué

10 March 1999 26	Monaco	0–0	Metz	Monaco
20:00 CET (UTC+1)		Report		Stadium: Stade Louis II; Attendance: 4,000; Referee: Serge Léon

20 March 1999 27	Metz	0–1	Lens	Metz
20:00 CET (UTC+1)		Report	Brunel 46'	Stadium: Stade Saint-Symphorien; Attendance: 18,218; Referee: Damien Ledentu

3 April 1999 28	Lyon	2–0	Metz	Lyon
20:00 CEST (UTC+2)	Toyes 66' (o.g.); Violeau 90'	Report		Stadium: Stade de Gerland; Attendance: 22,000; Referee: Bertrand Layec

9 April 1999 24	Nancy	1–0	Metz	Tomblaine
20:00 CEST (UTC+2)	Wiart 42'; Meniri (red card) 45'	Report		Stadium: Stade Marcel Picot; Attendance: 15,667; Referee: Jean-Claude Puyalt

14 April 1999 29	Metz	1–1	Paris Saint-Germain	Metz
20:00 CEST (UTC+2)	Jestrović 57'	Report	Algerino 46'	Stadium: Stade Saint-Symphorien; Attendance: 19,026; Referee: Marc Batta

24 April 1999 30	Nantes	0–0	Metz	Nantes
20:00 CEST (UTC+2)		Report		Stadium: Stade de la Beaujoire; Attendance: 30,252; Referee: Bruno Coué

1 May 1999 31	Metz	2–0	Auxerre	Metz
20:00 CEST (UTC+2)	Danjou 4' (o.g.); Horlaville 48'	Report		Stadium: Stade Saint-Symphorien; Attendance: 20,072; Referee: Patrick Lhermite

4 May 1999 32	Montpellier	1–1	Metz	Montpellier
18:00 CEST (UTC+2)	Thimothée 78' (pen.)	Report	Van Handenhoven 36'	Stadium: Stade de la Mosson; Attendance: 8,436; Referee: Gilles Chéron

22 May 1999 33	Rennes	1–0	Metz	Rennes
20:00 CEST (UTC+2)	Nonda 36' (pen.)	Report	Boffin (red card) 35'	Stadium: Stade de la Route de Lorient; Attendance: 16,500; Referee: Bernard Saules

29 May 1999 34	Metz	1–0	Le Havre	Metz
20:00 CEST (UTC+2)	Rizzetto 12'	Report		Stadium: Stade Saint-Symphorien; Attendance: 23,470; Referee: Serge Léon

=== Coupe de France ===
23 January 1999 Round of 64	Metz	1–0	Bordeaux	Metz
	Boffin 43'			Stadium: Stade Saint-Symphorien; Attendance: 10,680; Referee: Claude Colombo

19 February 1999 Round of 32	Wasquehal	0–2	Metz	Wasquehal
			Gaillot 56'; Horlaville 63'	Stadium: Complexe sportif Lucien Montagne; Attendance: 2,716; Referee: Pascal Garibian

14 March 1999 Round of 16	Metz	1–3	Nantes	Metz
	Meyrieu 70'		Monterrubio 33'; Savinaud 48'; Touré 90'	Stadium: Stade Saint-Symphorien; Attendance: 9,214; Referee: Bernard Saules

=== Coupe de la Ligue ===
9 January 1999 Round of 32	Metz	1–0	Nantes	Metz
	Toyes 34'			Stadium: Stade Saint-Symphorien; Attendance: 10,081; Referee: Jean-Claude Puyalt

2 February 1999 Round of 16	Metz	2–0	Louhans-Cuiseaux	Metz
	Meyrieu 78' (pen.); Jäger 88'		Ba (red card) 83'	Stadium: Stade Saint-Symphorien; Attendance: 6,000; Referee: Franck Glochon

7 March 1999 Quarter-finals	Metz	3–3 (a.e.t.) (3–2 p)	Toulouse	Metz
	Jestrović 61' (red card) 74'; Toyes (red card) 74'; Gaillot 88'; Strasser 104'		Moreau 38', 53'; Paviot (red card) 46'; Cobos (red card) 86'; Petrović 106'	Stadium: Stade Saint-Symphorien; Attendance: 8,566; Referee: Stéphane Bré

18 April 1999 Semi-finals	Metz	4–3	Montpellier	Metz
	Jestrović 13', 48', 85'; Meyrieu 51'		Silvestre 18'; Ouédec 49'; Delaye 62'	Stadium: Stade Saint-Symphorien; Attendance: 15,512; Referee: Pascal Garibian

8 May 1999 Final	Lens	1–0	Metz	Saint-Denis
	Moreira 56'			Stadium: Stade de France; Attendance: 78,180; Referee: Claude Colombo

=== Champions League ===
==== Second qualifying round ====
12 August 1998 First leg	HJK (Finland)	1–0	(France) Metz	Helsinki, Finland
19:00 CEST (UTC+2)	Strasser 71' (o.g.)	Report		Stadium: Olympic Stadium; Attendance: 8,287; Referee: Roelof Luinge (Netherlands)

26 August 1998 Second leg	Metz (France)	1–1 (1–2 agg.)	(Finland) HJK	Metz, France
20:00 CEST (UTC+2)	Meyrieu 78' (pen.)	Report	Vasara 68'	Stadium: Stade Saint-Symphorien; Attendance: 2,500; Referee: William Young (Scotland)

=== UEFA Cup ===
==== First round ====
15 September 1998 First leg	Red Star Belgrade (Federal Republic of Yugoslavia)	2–1	(France) Metz	Belgrade, FR Yugoslavia
18:00 CEST (UTC+2)	Ognjenović 3'; Drulić 12'	Report	Rodriguez 90'	Stadium: Red Star Stadium; Attendance: 45,000; Referee: Graziano Cesari (Italy)

29 September 1998 Second leg	Metz (France)	2–1 (a.e.t.) (3–3 agg.) (3–4 p)	(Federal Republic of Yugoslavia) Red Star Belgrade	Metz, France
18:30 CEST (UTC+2)	Kastendeuch 38'; Meyrieu 68' (pen.)	Report	Marinović 18'	Stadium: Stade Saint-Symphorien; Attendance: 8,448; Referee: Jacek Granat (Poland)
	Penalties
	Proment (penalty scored); Meyrieu (penalty scored); Jestrović (penalty missed); Boffin (penalty missed); Kastendeuch (penalty scored)		(penalty scored) Ljubojević; (penalty scored) Škorić; (penalty scored) Aćimović; (penalty missed) Mićić; (penalty scored) Bunjevčević
