= 1999 Coupe de la Ligue final =

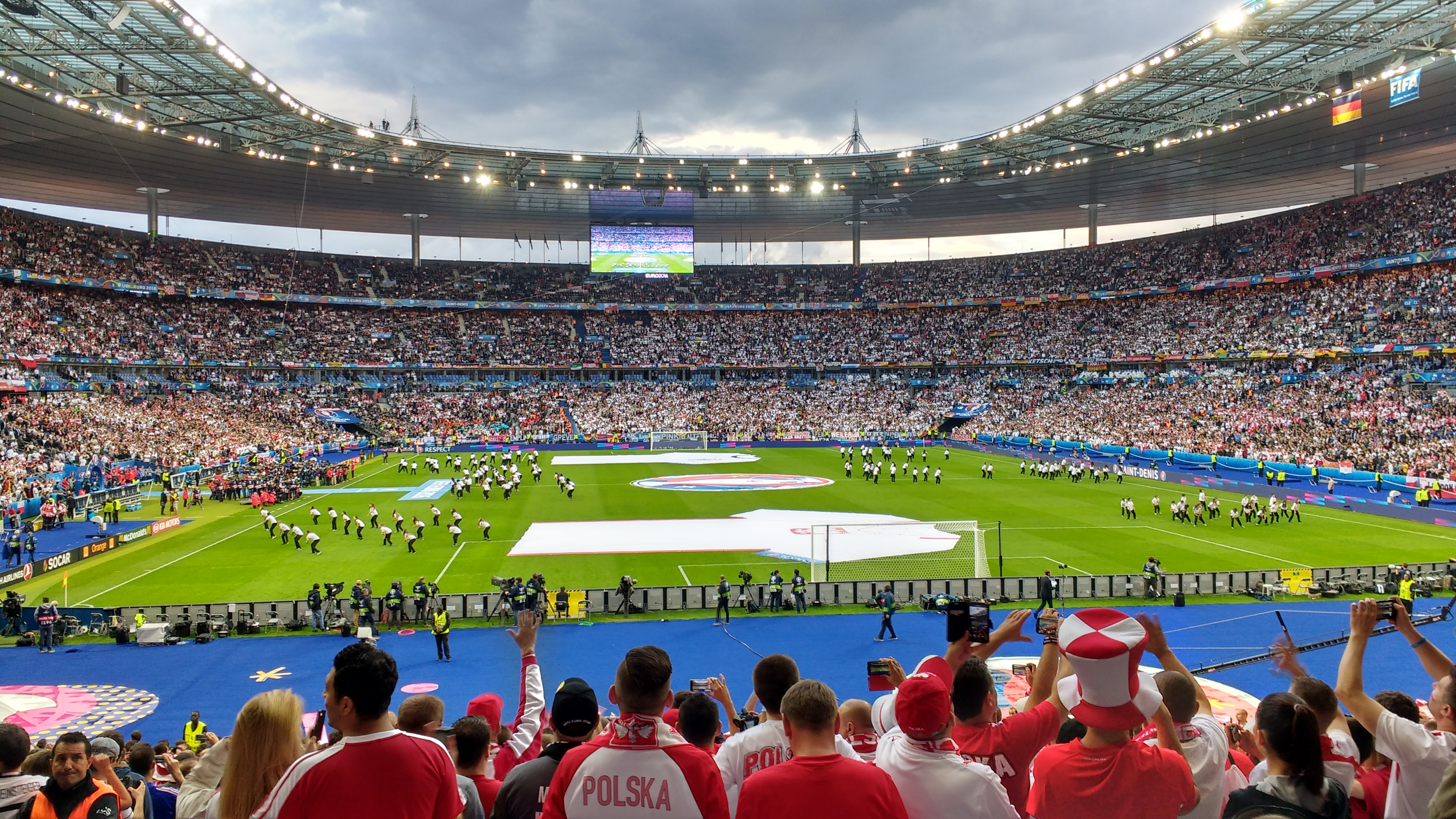
- Event: 1998–99 Coupe de la Ligue
Lens	Metz
Division 1	Division 1
1	0
- Date: 8 May 1999
- Venue: Stade de France, Paris
- Referee: Claude Colombo
- Attendance: 78,180

The 1999 Coupe de la Ligue final was a football match held at Stade de France, Saint-Denis on May 8, 1999, that saw RC Lens defeat FC Metz 1–0 thanks to a goal by Daniel Moreira.

It was the second time in as many seasons that Metz suffered at the hands of Lens, having lost out on goal difference in the battle between the two sides to claim a first-ever national championship in 1997–98 French Division 1.

== Route to the final ==
Note: In all results below, the score of the finalist is given first (H: home; A: away).

Lens		Round	Metz	
Opponent	Result	1998–99 Coupe de la Ligue	Opponent	Result
Marseille (A)	1–1 (a.e.t.) (6–5 p)	Second round	Nantes (H)	1–0
Le Havre (A)	2–0	Round of 16	Louhans-Cuiseaux (H)	2–0
Rennes (A)	1–0	Quarter-finals	Toulouse (H)	3–3 (a.e.t.) (3–2 p)
Sochaux (H)	2–0 (a.e.t.)	Semi-finals	Montpellier (H)	4–3

== Match details ==
8 May 1999
20:40

Lens	1–0	Metz
Moreira 56'

Stade de France, Saint-Denis
Attendance: 78,180
Referee: Claude Colombo

RC LENS:
GK	1	(France) Guillaume Warmuz
DF	2	(France) Eric Sikora
DF	4	(France) Cyrille Magnier
DF	13	(France) Frédéric Déhu (c)
MF	25	(France) Valérien Ismaël
MF	6	(France) Cyril Rool
MF	10	(France) Daniel Moreira	(substituted off) 77'
MF	8	(France) Stéphane Dalmat	(substituted off) 90'
MF	19	(Czech Republic) Vladimír Šmicer	(substituted off) 80'
FW	21	(France) Pascal Nouma
FW	11	(France) Tony Vairelles
Substitutes:
MF	7	(France) Mickaël Debève	(substituted on) 77'
MF	18	(France) Philippe Brunel	(substituted on) 80'
MF	9	(Ghana) Alex Nyarko	(substituted on) 90'
Unused substitutes:
GK	16	(France) Christophe Marichez
DF	3	(France) Yohan Lachor
Manager:
(France) Daniel Leclercq Assistant Referees: Fourth Official:

FC METZ:
GK	1	(France) Lionel Letizi
DF	2	(France) Pascal Pierre
DF	18	(Luxembourg) Jeff Strasser
DF	5	(France) Sylvain Kastendeuch (c)
DF	26	(United States) (France) David Regis	(substituted off) 68'
DF	14	(France) Geoffray Toyes
MF	8	(France) Franck Rizzetto
MF	25	(Belgium) Danny Boffin
MF	10	(France) Frédéric Meyrieu
MF	28	(Belgium) Gunter Van Handenhoven	(substituted off) 80'
FW	15	(Federal Republic of Yugoslavia) Nenad Jestrović
Substitutes:
MF	7	(France) Ludovic Asuar	(substituted on) 68'
DF	4	(France) Sébastien Schemmel	(substituted on) 80'
Unused substitutes:
GK	16	(France) André Biancarelli
MF	12	(France) Grégory Proment
FW	29	(Algeria) Nasreddine Kraouche
Manager:
(France) Joël Müller

== See also ==
- 1999 Coupe de France final
- 1998–99 FC Metz season
