= 1997–98 FC Metz season =

Metz
1997–98 season
- President: Carlo Molinari
- Head coach: Joël Müller
- Stadium: Stade Saint-Symphorien
- Division 1: 2nd
- Coupe de France: Round of 16
- Coupe de la Ligue: Quarter-finals
- UEFA Cup: Second round
- Top goalscorer: League: Bruno Rodriguez (13); All: Bruno Rodriguez (18)
- Average home league attendance: 16,349

The 1997–98 season was the 66th season in the existence of FC Metz and the club's 31st consecutive season in the top-flight of French football. In addition to the domestic league, Metz participated in this season's editions of the Coupe de France, the Coupe de la Ligue and UEFA Cup.

== Players ==
Squad at end of season

Note: Flags indicate national team as defined under FIFA eligibility rules; some limited exceptions apply. Players may hold more than one non-FIFA nationality.

No.	Pos.	Nation	Player
—	GK	FRA	André Biancarelli
—	GK	FRA	Lionel Letizi
—	DF	CMR	Rigobert Song
—	DF	FRA	Sylvain Kastendeuch
—	DF	FRA	Pascal Pierre
—	DF	FRA	Cyril Serredszum
—	DF	LUX	Jeff Strasser
—	DF	FRA	Geoffray Toyes
—	DF	FRA	Philippe Gaillot
—	DF	FRA	Stéphane Rondelaere
—	MF	FRA	Jocelyn Blanchard
—	MF	FRA	Franck Histilloles

No.	Pos.	Nation	Player
—	MF	FRA	Grégory Proment
—	MF	FRA	Jonathan Jager
—	MF	FRA	Didier Neumann
—	MF	BEL	Danny Boffin
—	MF	FRA	Frédéric Meyrieu
—	MF	FRA	Robert Pires
—	FW	FRA	Bruno Rodriguez
—	FW	FRA	Louis Saha
—	FW	YUG	Vladan Lukić
—	FW	SEN	Amara Traoré
—	FW	HUN	Mihály Tóth

== Competitions ==
=== Overview ===
Competition	First match	Last match	Starting round	Final position	Record							
Competition	First match	Last match	Starting round	Final position	Pld	W	D	L	GF	GA	GD	Win %
French Division 1	2 August 1997	9 May 1998	Matchday 1	2nd	34	20	8	6	48	28	+20	58.82
Coupe de France	17 January 1998	28 February 1998	Round of 64	Round of 16	3	1	1	1	2	3	−1	33.33
Coupe de la Ligue	5 January 1998	16 February 1998	Round of 32	Quarter-finals	3	2	0	1	4	2	+2	66.67
UEFA Cup	16 September 1997	4 November 1997	First round	Second round	4	2	1	1	7	4	+3	50.00
Total					44	25	10	9	61	37	+24	56.82

Source: Competitions

=== Division 1 ===
==== League table ====
Pos	Team	Pld	W	D	L	GF	GA	GD	Pts	Qualification or relegation
1	Lens (C)	34	21	5	8	55	30	+25	68	Qualification to Champions League group stage
2	Metz	34	20	8	6	48	28	+20	68	Qualification to Champions League second qualifying round
3	Monaco	34	18	5	11	51	33	+18	59	Qualification to UEFA Cup first round
4	Marseille	34	16	9	9	47	27	+20	57	Qualification to UEFA Cup first round
5	Bordeaux	34	15	11	8	49	41	+8	56	Qualification to UEFA Cup first round

Source: Ligue 1
Rules for classification: 1) points; 2) goal difference; 3) number of goals scored.
(C) Champions

==== Results summary ====
Overall								Home						Away					
Pld	W	D	L	GF	GA	GD	Pts	W	D	L	GF	GA	GD	W	D	L	GF	GA	GD
34	20	8	6	48	28	+20	68	14	0	3	31	12	+19	6	8	3	17	16	+1

Last updated: 9 May 1998.
Source: Competitive matches

==== Results by match ====
Match	1	2	3	4	5	6	7	8	9	10	11	12	13	14	15	16	17	18	19	20	21	22	23	24	25	26	27	28	29	30	31	32	33	34
Ground	A	H	A	H	A	A	H	A	H	A	H	A	H	A	H	A	H	A	H	A	H	H	A	H	A	H	A	H	A	H	A	H	A	H
Result	W	W	W	W	W	D	W	D	W	L	W	L	L	D	W	D	W	D	W	D	W	W	D	L	D	W	L	W	W	L	W	W	W	W
Position	5	1	2	1	1	1	1	1	1	1	1	2	3	3	2	3	1	2	2	2	1	1	1	1	2	2	2	1	1	2	2	2	2	2

A = Away; H = Home; W = Win; D = Draw; L = Loss

==== Matches ====
2 August 1997 1	Lyon	0–1	Metz	Lyon
20:00 CEST (UTC+2)		Report		Stadium: Stade de Gerland

8 August 1997 2	Metz	4–1	Bordeaux	Metz
20:00 CEST (UTC+2)		Report		Stadium: Stade Saint-Symphorien

15 August 1997 3	Châteauroux	1–2	Metz	Châteauroux
20:00 CEST (UTC+2)		Report		Stadium: Stade Gaston Petit

22 August 1997 4	Metz	2–1	Paris Saint-Germain	Metz
20:00 CEST (UTC+2)		Report		Stadium: Stade Saint-Symphorien

29 August 1997 5	Monaco	1–2	Metz	Monaco
20:00 CEST (UTC+2)		Report		Stadium: Stade Louis II

5 September 1997 6	Rennes	2–2	Metz	Rennes
20:00 CEST (UTC+2)		Report		Stadium: Stade de la Route de Lorient

12 September 1997 7	Metz	2–0	Cannes	Metz
20:00 CEST (UTC+2)		Report		Stadium: Stade Saint-Symphorien

21 September 1997 8	Bastia	0–0	Metz	Furiani
20:00 CEST (UTC+2)		Report		Stadium: Stade Armand Cesari

26 September 1997 9	Metz	3–0	Auxerre	Metz
20:00 CEST (UTC+2)		Report		Stadium: Stade Saint-Symphorien

5 October 1997 10	Strasbourg	2–0	Metz	Strasbourg
20:00 CEST (UTC+2)		Report		Stadium: Stade de la Meinau

8 October 1997 11	Metz	2–0	Le Havre	Metz
20:00 CEST (UTC+2)		Report		Stadium: Stade Saint-Symphorien

16 October 1997 12	Marseille	2–0	Metz	Marseille
20:00 CEST (UTC+2)		Report		Stadium: Stade Vélodrome

25 October 1997 13	Metz	0–1	Montpellier	Metz
20:00 CEST (UTC+2)		Report		Stadium: Stade Saint-Symphorien

31 October 1997 14	Lens	1–1	Metz	Lens
20:00 CET (UTC+1)		Report		Stadium: Stade Félix-Bollaert

8 November 1997 15	Metz	2–1	Guingamp	Metz
20:00 CET (UTC+1)		Report		Stadium: Stade Saint-Symphorien

15 November 1997 16	Nantes	1–1	Metz	Nantes
20:00 CET (UTC+1)		Report		Stadium: Stade de la Beaujoire

21 November 1997 17	Metz	2–1	Toulouse	Metz
20:00 CET (UTC+1)		Report		Stadium: Stade Saint-Symphorien

30 November 1997 18	Bordeaux	2–2	Metz	Bordeaux
20:00 CET (UTC+1)		Report		Stadium: Parc Lescure

5 December 1997 19	Metz	2–0	Châteauroux	Metz
20:00 CET (UTC+1)		Report		Stadium: Stade Saint-Symphorien

14 December 1997 20	Paris Saint-Germain	1–1	Metz	Paris
20:00 CET (UTC+1)		Report		Stadium: Parc des Princes

18 December 1997 21	Metz	3–0	Monaco	Metz
20:00 CET (UTC+1)		Report		Stadium: Stade Saint-Symphorien

10 January 1998 22	Metz	1–0	Rennes	Metz
20:00 CET (UTC+1)		Report		Stadium: Stade Saint-Symphorien

20 January 1998 23	Cannes	1–1	Metz	Cannes
20:00 CET (UTC+1)		Report		Stadium: Stade Pierre-de-Coubertin

24 January 1998 24	Metz	0–1	Bastia	Metz
20:00 CET (UTC+1)		Report		Stadium: Stade Saint-Symphorien

4 February 1998 25	Auxerre	0–0	Metz	Auxerre
20:00 CET (UTC+1)		Report		Stadium: Stade de l'Abbé-Deschamps

13 February 1998 26	Metz	1–0	Strasbourg	Metz
20:00 CET (UTC+1)		Report		Stadium: Stade Saint-Symphorien

21 February 1998 27	Le Havre	2–1	Metz	Le Havre
20:00 CET (UTC+1)		Report		Stadium: Stade Jules Deschaseaux

6 March 1998 28	Metz	3–2	Marseille	Metz
20:00 CET (UTC+1)		Report		Stadium: Stade Saint-Symphorien

13 March 1998 29	Montpellier	0–1	Metz	Montpellier
20:00 CET (UTC+1)		Report		Stadium: Stade de la Mosson

29 March 1998 30	Metz	0–2	Lens	Metz
20:00 CEST (UTC+2)		Report		Stadium: Stade Saint-Symphorien

8 April 1998 31	Guingamp	0–1	Metz	Guingamp
20:00 CEST (UTC+2)		Report		Stadium: Stade du Roudourou

17 April 1998 32	Metz	3–2	Nantes	Metz
20:00 CEST (UTC+2)		Report		Stadium: Stade Saint-Symphorien

25 April 1998 33	Toulouse	0–1	Metz	Toulouse
20:00 CEST (UTC+2)		Report		Stadium: Stadium de Toulouse

9 May 1998 34	Metz	1–0	Lyon	Metz
20:00 CEST (UTC+2)		Report		Stadium: Stade Saint-Symphorien

=== Coupe de France ===
17 January 1998 Round of 64	Le Mans	1–1 (a.e.t.) (2–4 p)	Metz	Le Mans
				Stadium: Stade Léon-Bollée

8 February 1998 Round of 32	Metz	1–0	Bastia	Metz
				Stadium: Stade Saint-Symphorien

28 February 1998 Round of 16	Bourg-Péronnas	2–0	Metz	Lyon
				Stadium: Stade de Gerland

=== Coupe de la Ligue ===
5 January 1998 Round of 32	Gueugnon	1–2	Metz	Gueugnon
				Stadium: Stade Jean Laville

31 January 1998 Round of 16	Martigues	0–2	Metz	Martigues
				Stadium: Stade Francis Turcan

16 February 1998 Quarter-finals	Paris Saint-Germain	1–0	Metz	Paris
				Stadium: Parc des Princes

=== UEFA Cup ===
==== First round ====
16 September 1997 First leg	Excelsior Mouscron (Belgium)	0–2	(France) Metz	Mouscron, Belgium
20:00 CEST (UTC+2)		Report	Meyrieu 19'; Rodriguez 22'	Stadium: Stade Le Canonnier; Attendance: 6,700; Referee: Kurt Zuppinger (Switzerland)

30 September 1997 Second leg	Metz (France)	4–1 (6–1 agg.)	(Belgium) Excelsior Mouscron	Metz, France
20:00 CEST (UTC+2)	Rodriguez 4', 25'; Kastendeuch 39'; Gaillot 90'	Report	van Durme 10'	Stadium: Stade Saint-Symphorien; Attendance: 7,485; Referee: Lucilio Cortez Baptista (Portugal)

==== Second round ====
21 October 1997 First leg	Metz (France)	0–2	(Germany) Karlsruhe	Metz, France
20:00 CEST (UTC+2)		Report	Häßler 13', 39'	Stadium: Stade Saint-Symphorien; Attendance: 14,000; Referee: José María García-Aranda (Spain)

4 November 1997 Second leg	Karlsruhe (Germany)	1–1 (3–1 agg.)	(France) Metz	Karlsruhe, Germany
18:00 CET (UTC+1)	Häßler 36'	Report	Boffin 10'	Stadium: Wildparkstadion; Attendance: 13,500; Referee: Graziano Cesari (Italy)
