= 2006–07 Coupe de France =

Tournament details
- Country: France
- Teams: 6,577

Final positions
- Champions: Sochaux
- Runners-up: Marseille

Tournament statistics
- Top goal scorer(s): Djibril Cissé (7 goals)

The Coupe de France's results of the 2006–07 season. 6577 clubs participated in the cup and the final was played on May 12.

The cup winner qualified for UEFA Cup qualification.

== Round of 64 ==
Team 1	Score	Team 2
Créteil (L2)	1–2 (a.e.t.)	Nice (L1)
Nancy (L1)	3–3 (a.e.t.) (8–9 p)	Lens (L1)
Saint-Étienne (L1)	1–3	Sochaux (L1)
Bordeaux (L1)	2–0	Bastia (L2)
Auxerre (L1)	2–2 (a.e.t.) (4–5 p)	Niort (L2)
Nantes (L1)	1–0	Guingamp (L2)
Valenciennes (L1)	2–1	Caen (L2)
Metz (L2)	0–2	Lille (L1)
Libourne-Saint-Seurin (L2)	4–2	Troyes (L1)
Rennes (L1)	1–3 (a.e.t.)	Romorantin (Nat.)
Châtellerault (Nat.)	1–1 (a.e.t.) (3–4 p)	Toulouse (L1)
Calais (CFA)	2–0	Lorient (L1)
Quevilly (CFA)	0–2	Monaco (L1)
Cambrai (CFA2)	1–4 (a.e.t.)	Marseille (L1)
Pont-de-Chéruy (DH)	0–1	Sedan (L1)
Pluvigner (DSR)	0–3	Le Mans (L1)
Amiens (L2)	3–0	Grenoble (L2)
Gueugnon (L2)	3–1	Louhans-Cuiseaux (Nat.)
Gazélec Ajaccio (CFA)	1–2	Strasbourg (L2)
Montpellier (L2)	4–1	Saint-Lô (CFA2)
Vannes (Nat.)	3–2	Concarneau (CFA)
Lyon-Duchère (CFA2)	1–0	Entente SSG (Nat.)
Orléans (CFA)	2–1	Moulins (CFA)
Pontivy (CFA)	1–0 (a.e.t.)	La Vitréenne (CFA2)
Rodez (CFA)	3–1	Angoulême (DH)
Paris Saint-Germain (L1)	3–0	Nîmes (Nat.)
Bayonne (CFA)	1–2	Lyon (L1)
Clermont (Nat.)	3–1	Dunkerque (CFA)
Bois-Guillaume (CFA)	0–1^{1}	Châteaubriant (CFA2)
Feignies (CFA2)	1–2	Montceau (CFA)
Jarville (CFA2)	1–0	Amnéville (CFA2)
Palaiseau (DSR)	0–4	Laon (CFA2)

^{1}Bois-Guillaume won administratively (A suspended player took part to the match).

== Round of 32 ==
Team 1	Score	Team 2
Amiens (L2)	1–3	Nantes (L1)
Romorantin (Nat.)	1–2	Valenciennes (L1)
Strasbourg (L2)	2–3	Lille (L1)
Pontivy (CFA)	0–2	Montceau (CFA)
Jarville (CFA2)	3–5 (a.e.t.)	Libourne-Saint-Seurin (L2)
Paris Saint-Germain (L1)	1–0	Gueugnon (L2)
Laon (CFA2)	1–3	Lyon (L1)
Orléans (CFA)	1–3	Lens (L1)
Calais (CFA)	1–2	Sedan (L1)
Monaco (L1)	2–0	Toulouse (L1)
Sochaux (L1)	2–1	Lyon-Duchère (CFA2)
Montpellier (L2)	1–1 (a.e.t.) (4–2 p)	Nice (L1)
Clermont (Nat.)	1–0	Rodez (CFA)
Bordeaux (L1)	3–3 (a.e.t.) (5–4 p)	Niort (L2)
Le Mans (L1)	0–1 (a.e.t.)	Marseille (L1)
Bois-Guillaume (CFA)	1–1 (a.e.t.) (5–6 p)	Vannes (Nat.)

== Round of 16 ==
Team 1	Score	Team 2
Nantes (L1)	1–0 (a.e.t.)	Lille (L1)
Paris Saint-Germain (L1)	1–0	Valenciennes (L1)
Montceau (CFA)	2–2 (a.e.t.) (5–4 p)	Bordeaux (L1)
Clermont (Nat.)	1–4	Lens (L1)
Montpellier (L2)	0–2 (a.e.t.)	Vannes (Nat.)
Libourne-Saint-Seurin (L2)	1–2	Sedan (L1)
Monaco (L1)	0–2	Sochaux (L1)
Marseille (L1)	2–1	Lyon (L1)

== Quarter-finals ==
27 February 2007	Sedan (1)	1–1 (a.e.t.) (4–5 p)	Nantes (1)	Sedan
17:00	Pujol 13'		Keșerü 15'	Stadium: Stade Louis Dugauguez; Attendance: 8,639; Referee: Stéphane Bré
	Penalties
	Ducourtioux (penalty scored); Belhadj (penalty scored); Badiane (penalty scored); Amalfitano (penalty scored); Job (penalty scored); Marin (penalty missed)		(penalty scored) das Neves; (penalty scored) Cetto; (penalty scored) Da Rocha; (penalty scored) Keșerü; (penalty scored) Diallo; (penalty scored) Rossi

27 February 2007	Marseille (1)	5–0	Vannes (3)	Marseille
20:45	Niang 2'; Maoulida 32' (pen.), 65'; Cissé 61' (pen.); Pagis 90+1'			Stadium: Stade Vélodrome; Attendance: 32,000; Referee: Olivier Thual

28 February 2007	Montceau (4)	1–0	Lens (1)	Gueugnon
18:15	Alidor 79' (pen.)			Stadium: Stade Jean Laville; Attendance: 11,634; Referee: Bruno Coué

28 February 2007	Sochaux (1)	2–1	Paris Saint-Germain (1)	Montbéliard
21:00	Isabey 25'; Dagano 40'		Afolabi 75' (o.g.)	Stadium: Stade Auguste Bonal; Attendance: 18,054; Referee: Laurent Duhamel

== Semi-finals ==
17 April 2007	Montceau (4)	0–2 (a.e.t.)	Sochaux (1)	Gueugnon
21:00			Grax 95'; Leroy 111'	Stadium: Stade Jean Laville; Attendance: 13,800; Referee: Thierry Auriac

18 April 2007	Marseille (1)	3–0	Nantes (1)	Marseille
21:00	Ribéry 28'; Maoulida 55'; Cissé 76'			Stadium: Stade Vélodrome; Attendance: 55,333; Referee: Tony Chapron

== Final ==
12 May 2007
20:50

Marseille	2–2 (a.e.t.)	Sochaux
Cissé 5', 98'		Dagano 67'; Le Tallec 115'
Penalties
Taiwo (penalty scored); Maoulida (penalty missed); Cana (penalty scored); Cissé (penalty scored); Nasri (penalty scored); Zubar (penalty missed)	4–5	(penalty scored) Ziani; (penalty scored) Birsa; (penalty scored) Le Tallec; (penalty scored) Leroy; (penalty missed) Bréchet; (penalty scored) Brunel

Stade de France, Saint-Denis
Attendance: 79,797
Referee: Éric Poulat

== Topscorer ==
Djibril Cissé (7 goals)
