= 1998–99 Stade Rennais FC season =

Stade Rennais FC
1998–99 season
- Head coach: Paul Le Guen
- Stadium: Roazhon Park
- French Division 1: 5th
- Coupe de France: Round of 32
- Coupe de la Ligue: Quarter-finals
- Top goalscorer: League: Shabani Nonda (15); All: Shabani Nonda (18)
- Average home league attendance: 15,546
- Biggest win: 4–0 v Sochaux; 4–0 v JS Coulaines

The 1998–99 season was the 98th season in the history of Stade Rennais FC and their fifth consecutive season in the top flight. The club participated in French Division 1, Coupe de France, and Coupe de la Ligue.

== Pre-season and friendlies ==
Win Draw Loss

== Competitions ==
=== Overall record ===
Competition	First match	Last match	Starting round	Final position	Record							
Competition	First match	Last match	Starting round	Final position	Pld	W	D	L	GF	GA	GD	Win %
French Division 1	7 August 1998	29 May 1999	Matchday 1	5th	4	1	1	2	4	5	−1	25.00
Coupe de France	23 January 1999	19 February 1999	Round of 64	Round of 32	2	1	0	1	4	2	+2	50.00
Coupe de la Ligue	10 January 1999	7 March 1999	Round of 32	Quarter-finals	3	2	0	1	5	1	+4	66.67
Total					9	4	1	4	13	8	+5	44.44

Source: Competitions

=== French Division 1 ===
==== League table ====
Pos	Team	Pld	W	D	L	GF	GA	GD	Pts	Qualification or relegation
3	Lyon	34	18	9	7	51	31	+20	63	Qualification to Champions League third qualifying round
4	Monaco	34	18	8	8	52	32	+20	62	Qualification to UEFA Cup first round
5	Rennes	34	17	8	9	45	38	+7	59	Qualification to Intertoto Cup third round
6	Lens	34	14	7	13	46	43	+3	49	Qualification to UEFA Cup first round (Note: Lens was qualified for the 1999–2000 UEFA Cup as winners of the 1998–99 Coupe de la Ligue. Also, Nantes was qualified for the 1999–2000 UEFA Cup as winners of the 1998–99 Coupe de France.)
7	Nantes	34	12	12	10	40	34	+6	48	Qualification to UEFA Cup first round

Source: Ligue 1
Rules for classification: 1) points; 2) goal difference; 3) number of goals scored.

==== Results summary ====
Overall								Home						Away					
Pld	W	D	L	GF	GA	GD	Pts	W	D	L	GF	GA	GD	W	D	L	GF	GA	GD
34	17	8	9	45	38	+7	59	12	4	1	28	12	+16	5	4	8	17	26	−9

Source: French Division 1

==== Results by round ====
Round	1	2	3	4	5	6	7	8	9	10	11	12	13	14	15	16	17	18	19	20	21	22	23	24	25	26	27	28	29	30	31	32	33	34
Ground	H	A	H	H	A	H	A	H	A	H	A	H	A	H	A	H	A	H	A	A	H	A	H	A	H	A	H	A	H	A	H	A	H	A
Result	W	L	W	D	D	W	L	W	W	W	W	W	L	D	L	L	D	W	L	D	D	W	D	L	W	D	W	W	W	W	W	L	W	L
Position	5	8	6	7	6	5	7	7	4	3	3	3	3	3	3	3	3	3	3	4	5	4	5	6	5	5	5	4	4	4	4	5	5	5

Source: French Division 1
A = Away; H = Home; W = Win; D = Draw; L = Loss

==== Matches ====
8 August 1998 1	Rennes	1–0	Auxerre	Rennes
CEST (UTC+2)				Stadium: Stade de la Route de Lorient

15 August 1998 2	Montpellier	3–1	Rennes	Montpellier
CEST (UTC+2)				Stadium: [[]]

22 August 1998 3	Rennes	2–1	Le Havre	Rennes
CEST (UTC+2)				Stadium: Stade de la Route de Lorient

30 August 1998 4	Rennes	1–1	Strasbourg	Rennes
CEST (UTC+2)				Stadium: Stade de la Route de Lorient

11 September 1998 5	Marseille	1–1	Rennes	Marseille
CEST (UTC+2)				Stadium: [[]]

19 September 1998 6	Rennes	2–0	Bastia	Rennes
CEST (UTC+2)				Stadium: Stade de la Route de Lorient

25 September 1998 7	Bordeaux	4–0	Rennes	Bordeaux
CEST (UTC+2)				Stadium: [[]]

3 October 1998 8	Rennes	2–1	Monaco	Rennes
CEST (UTC+2)				Stadium: Stade de la Route de Lorient

17 October 1998 9	Nancy	0–1	Rennes	Tomblaine
CEST (UTC+2)				Stadium: [[]]

24 October 1998 10	Rennes	1–0	Lorient	Rennes
CEST (UTC+2)				Stadium: Stade de la Route de Lorient

30 October 1998 11	Toulouse	0–1	Rennes	Toulouse
CEST (UTC+2)				Stadium: [[]]

7 November 1998 12	Rennes	4–0	Sochaux	Rennes
CET (UTC+1)				Stadium: Stade de la Route de Lorient

11 November 1998 13	Lens	3–1	Rennes	Lens
CEST (UTC+2)				Stadium: [[]]

14 November 1998 14	Rennes	0–0	Lyon	Rennes
CET (UTC+1)				Stadium: Stade de la Route de Lorient

20 November 1998 15	Paris Saint-Germain	2–1	Rennes	Paris
CEST (UTC+2)				Stadium: [[]]

28 November 1998 16	Rennes	2–3	Nantes	Rennes
CET (UTC+1)				Stadium: Stade de la Route de Lorient

4 December 1998 17	Metz	0–0	Rennes	Metz
CEST (UTC+2)				Stadium: [[]]

11 December 1998 18	Rennes	3–2	Nantes	Rennes
CET (UTC+1)				Stadium: Stade de la Route de Lorient

16 December 1998 19	Le Havre	2–0	Rennes	Le Havre
CEST (UTC+2)				Stadium: [[]]

19 December 1998 20	Strasbourg	1–1	Rennes	Strasbourg
CEST (UTC+2)				Stadium: [[]]

16 January 1999 21	Rennes	1–1	Marseille	Rennes
CET (UTC+1)				Stadium: Stade de la Route de Lorient

29 January 1999 22	Bastia	0–1	Rennes	Furiani
CEST (UTC+2)				Stadium: [[]]

6 February 1999 23	Rennes	1–1	Bordeaux	Rennes
CET (UTC+1)				Stadium: Stade de la Route de Lorient

13 February 1999 24	Monaco	4–2	Rennes	Monaco
CEST (UTC+2)				Stadium: Stade Louis II

26 February 1999 25	Rennes	2–1	Nancy	Rennes
CET (UTC+1)				Stadium: Stade de la Route de Lorient

10 March 1999 26	Lorient	1–1	Rennes	Lorient
CEST (UTC+2)				Stadium: [[]]

20 March 1999 27	Rennes	1–0	Toulouse	Rennes
CET (UTC+1)				Stadium: Stade de la Route de Lorient

2 April 1999 28	Sochaux	0–3	Rennes	Montbéliard
CEST (UTC+2)				Stadium: [[]]

13 April 1999 29	Rennes	2–0	Lens	Rennes
CEST (UTC+2)				Stadium: Stade de la Route de Lorient

25 April 1999 30	Lyon	1–2	Rennes	Lyon
CEST (UTC+2)				Stadium: [[]]

1 May 1999 31	Rennes	2–1	Paris Saint-Germain	Rennes
CEST (UTC+2)				Stadium: Stade de la Route de Lorient

5 May 1999 32	Nantes	2–1	Rennes	Nantes
CEST (UTC+2)				Stadium: [[]]

22 May 1999 33	Rennes	1–0	Metz	Rennes
CEST (UTC+2)				Stadium: Stade de la Route de Lorient

29 May 1999 34	Auxerre	2–0	Rennes	Auxerre
CEST (UTC+2)				Stadium: [[]]

=== Coupe de France ===
23 January 1999 Round of 64	JS Coulaines	0–4	Rennes	Rennes
CET (UTC+1)				Stadium: Stade de la Route de Lorient; Attendance: 5,738; Referee: Michel Bonnichon

19 February 1999 Round of 32	Le Mans	2–0	Rennes	Le Mans
CET (UTC+1)				Stadium: [[]]

=== Coupe de la Ligue ===
10 January 1999 Round of 32	Laval	0–1	Rennes	Laval
19:00 CET (UTC+1)				Stadium: Stade Francis Le Basser; Attendance: 10,684; Referee: Laurent Duhamel

3 February 1999 Round of 16	Rennes	4–0	Troyes	Rennes
15:45 CET (UTC+1)				Stadium: Stade de la Route de Lorient

7 March 1999 Quarter-finals	Rennes	0–1	Lens	Rennes
19:45 CET (UTC+1)				Stadium: Stade de la Route de Lorient

=== Goalscorers ===
Rank	Pos	No.	Nat	Name	Division 1	Coupe de France	Coupe de la Ligue	Total
1	FW		(Zaire)	Shabani Nonda	15	1	2	18
2	MF		(France)	Cédric Bardon	8	0	1	9
3	FW		(France)	Nicolas Goussé	6	1	0	7
4	DF		(France)	Dominique Arribagé	2	0	0	2
Own goals					0	0	0	0
Totals					0	4	5	9
