= 2007 Coupe de France final =

Final of the 2006–07 edition of the Coupe de France

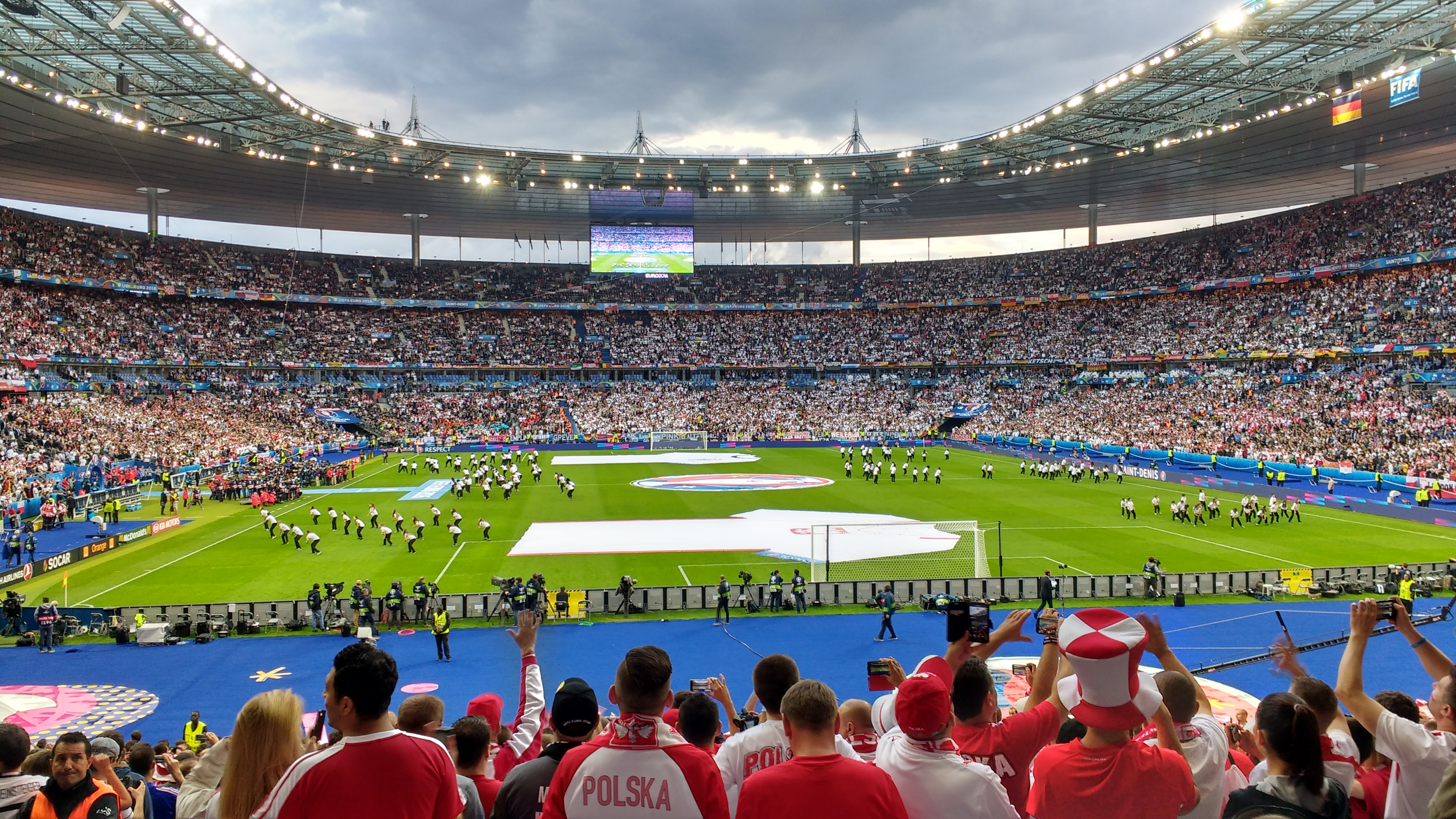
- Event: 2006–07 Coupe de France
Marseille	Sochaux
2	2
- After extra time Sochaux won 5–4 on penalties
- Date: 12 May 2007
- Venue: Stade de France, Saint-Denis
- Referee: Éric Poulat
- Attendance: 79,797

The 2007 Coupe de France final was the final match of the 2006-07 season of Coupe de France, a domestic club football tournament organised by the French Football Federation since 1917. It was held at Stade de France in Saint-Denis on 12 May 2007. It was competed between Olympique de Marseille and FC Sochaux-Montbéliard.

Sochaux won its second cup title after defeating Marseille 5–4 in a penalty shoot-out after the match ended in a 2–2 draw at the end of regulation time and extra time. While Toifilou Maoulida and Ronald Zubar missed their penalties for Marseille, only Jérémie Bréchet missed his penalty for the winning team. As winners of the Coupe de France, Sochaux earned a spot to play in the 2007–08 UEFA Cup and compete in the 2007 Trophée des Champions.

== Background ==
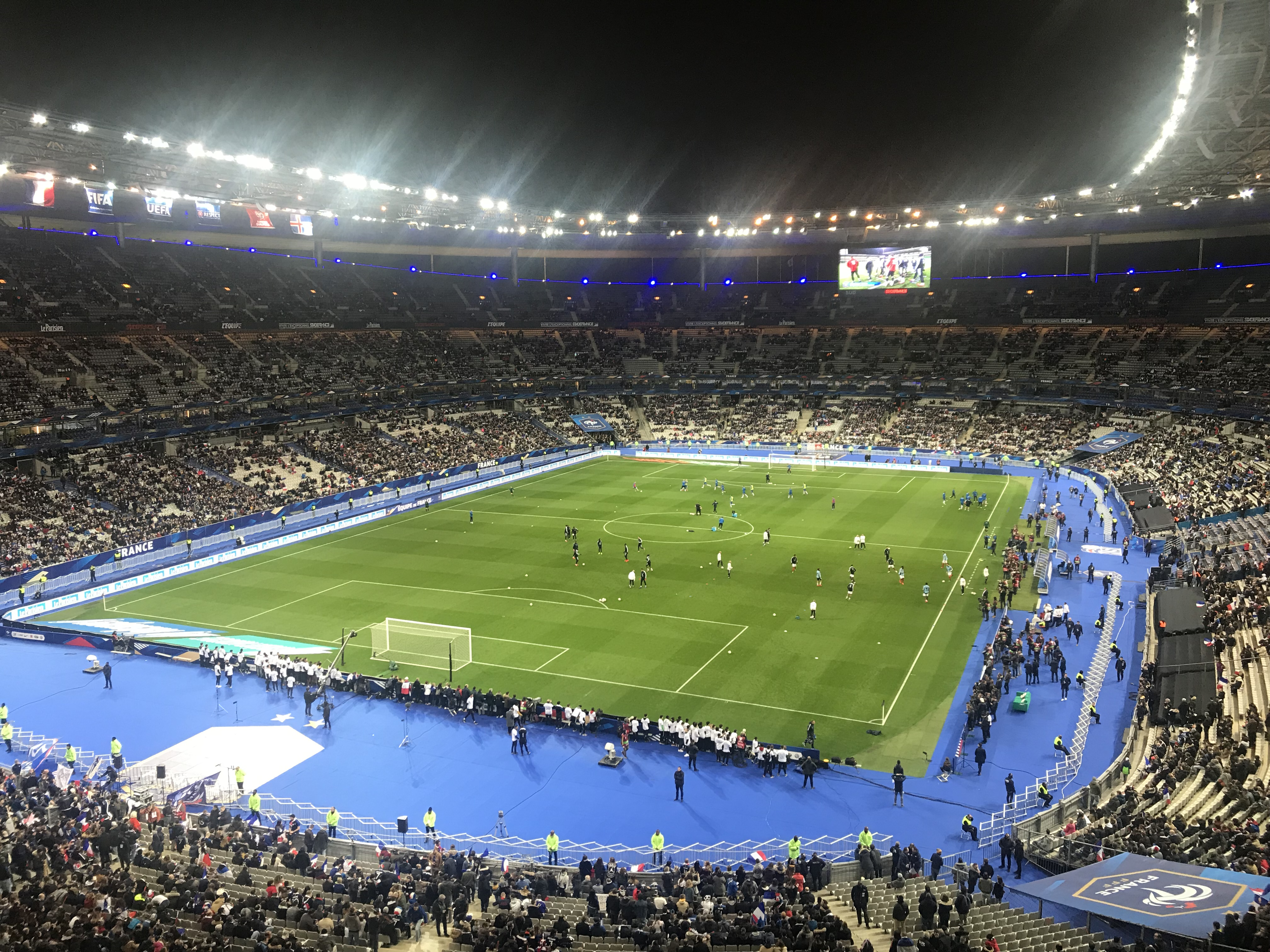
Stade de France hosted the final

Coupe de France is a domestic club football tournament organised by the French Football Federation since 1917. Olympique de Marseille had won the tournament a record ten times prior to the competition. Marseille won its first cup in 1924 with the last title coming in 1989. FC Sochaux-Montbéliard had previously won the competition once in 1937. Marseille were favorites and considered this an opportunity to end a 14-year trophy drought. Sochaux finishesd 15th in the 2005-06 Ligue 1 season and were surprise entrants to the final of the Cup.

== Venue ==
The final was held at the Stade de France in Saint-Denis on 12 May 2007. The final of the competition has been held at the stadium every year since 1998. The multi-purpose stadium was built in 1998 for the 1998 FIFA World Cup and has a capacity of 81,338 for football matches.

== Route to the final ==
About 6,577 teams entered the competition. As both the clubs were part of the 2006-07 Ligue 1, they entered the competition in the round of 64.

Marseille			Round	Sochaux		
Opponent	H/A	Result	Round	Opponent	H/A	Result
Cambrai	A	4–1 (a.e.t.)	Round of 64	Saint-Étienne	A	3–1
Le Mans	A	1–0 (a.e.t.)	Round of 32	Lyon-Duchère	H	2–1
Lyon	H	2–1	Round of 16	Monaco	A	2–0
Vannes	H	5–0	Quarter-finals	Paris SG	A	2–1
Nantes	H	3–0	Semi-finals	Montceau	A	2–0 (a.e.t.)

== Match ==
The match kicked off at 20:00 local time with an attendance of 79,797 people. Marseille took the lead after Djibril Cissé in the fifth minute, and led by a single goal at half time. Mid-way through the second half, Sochaux equalized through Moumouni Dagano. The match ended in a stalemate in regulation time after no further goals were scored. In extra time, Cisse again gave the lead for Marseille in the 98th minute before Sochaux came back to equalize for the second time in the last few minutes of the game through Anthony Le Tallec.

In the ensuing penalty shoot-out, Toifilou Maoulida missed Marseille's second penalty to handover the advantage to Sochaux. However, Jérémie Bréchet missed his team's fifth and decisive penalty and the score remained 4-4 on penalties. Sochaux goalkeeper Teddy Richert saved the penalty taken by Ronald Zubar before Philippe Brunel scored the winning penalty for the team.

=== Details ===
12 May 2007
20:50

Marseille	2–2 (a.e.t.)	Sochaux
Cissé 5', 98'		Dagano 67'; Le Tallec 115'
Penalties
Taiwo (penalty scored); Maoulida (penalty missed); Cana (penalty scored); Cissé (penalty scored); Nasri (penalty scored); Zubar (penalty missed)	4–5	(penalty scored) Ziani; (penalty scored) Birsa; (penalty scored) Le Tallec; (penalty scored) Leroy; (penalty missed) Bréchet; (penalty scored) Brunel

Stade de France, Saint-Denis
Attendance: 79,797
Referee: Éric Poulat

Marseille	Sochaux

Marseille:
GK	1	(France) Cédric Carrasso
RB	2	(Senegal) Habib Beye (c)
CB	4	(France) Julien Rodríguez	(yellow card) 90'
CB	5	(France) Ronald Zubar
LB	3	(Nigeria) Taye Taiwo
DM	6	(Albania) Lorik Cana
DM	8	(Cameroon) Modeste M'bami		(substituted off) 94'
RW	7	(France) Franck Ribéry
AM	10	(France) Samir Nasri
LW	11	(Senegal) Mamadou Niang		(substituted off) 74'
CF	9	(France) Djibril Cissé
Substitutes:
GK	16	(France) Sébastien Hamel
DF	12	(Argentina) Renato Civelli
MF	14	(Nigeria) Wilson Oruma	(yellow card) 100'	(substituted on) 74'
FW	15	(France) Mickaël Pagis
FW	13	(France) Toifilou Maoulida		(substituted on) 94'
Manager:
(France) Albert Emon

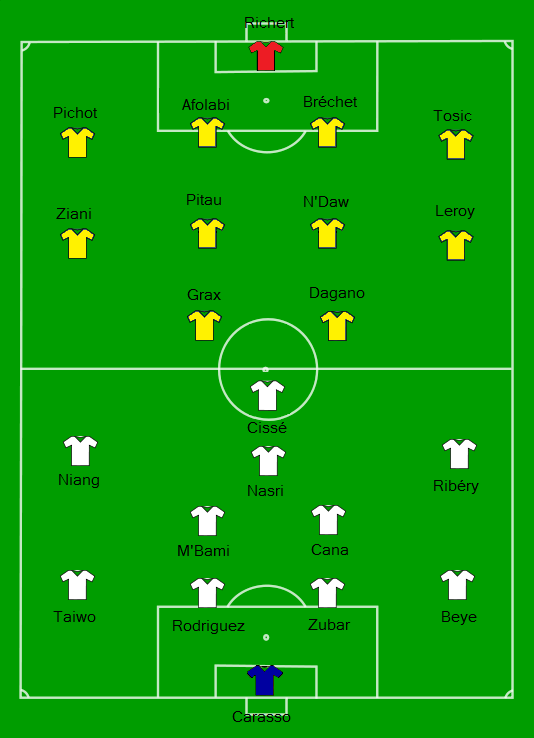

Souchaux:
GK	1	(France) Teddy Richert
RB	3	(France) Stéphane Pichot
CB	7	(Nigeria) Rabiu Afolabi
CB	2	(France) Jérémie Bréchet (c)
LB	4	(Serbia) Duško Tošić
RM	6	(Algeria) Karim Ziani
CM	11	(France) Romain Pitau		(substituted off) 106'
CM	5	(Senegal) Guirane N'Daw
LM	10	(France) Jérôme Leroy	(yellow card) 31'
CF	8	(France) Sébastien Grax		(substituted off) 74'
CF	9	(Burkina Faso) Moumouni Dagano		(substituted off) 104'
Substitutes:
GK	16	(France) Jérémy Gavanon
DF	12	(France) Lionel Potillon
MF	13	(France) Philippe Brunel		(substituted on) 106'
FW	14	(France) Anthony Le Tallec		(substituted on) 104'
FW	15	(Slovenia) Valter Birsa		(substituted on) 74'
Manager:
(France) Alain Perrin

== Aftermath ==
The final victory led to Sochaux lifting the Coupe de France for the second time in the club's history and their first win in over 70 years. As winners of the Coupe de France, Sochaux earned a spot to play in the 2007–08 UEFA Cup and compete in the 2007 Trophée des Champions.

== See also ==
- 2006–07 Coupe de France
