= Valter Birsa =

Slovenian footballer (born 1986)

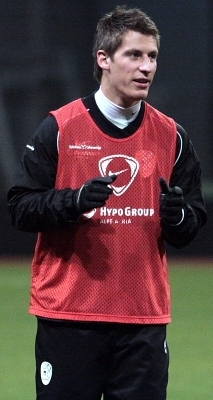
- Birsa in November 2009

Personal information
- Date of birth: 7 August 1986 (age 40)
- Place of birth: Šempeter pri Gorici, SR Slovenia, SFR Yugoslavia
- Height: 1.84 m (6 ft 0 in)
- Positions: Winger; attacking midfielder

Youth career
- 1991–2004: Bilje
- 2004–2005: Gorica

Senior career*
Years	Team	Apps	(Gls)
2003	Primorje	1	(0)
2004	Bilje	7	(6)
2004–2006	Gorica	61	(26)
2006–2009	Sochaux	66	(8)
2009	→ Auxerre (loan)	15	(1)
2009–2011	Auxerre	68	(8)
2011–2013	Genoa	9	(0)
2012–2013	→ Torino (loan)	17	(2)
2013–2015	AC Milan	15	(2)
2014–2015	→ Chievo (loan)	35	(0)
2015–2019	Chievo	122	(18)
2019–2020	Cagliari	25	(0)
Total		441	(71)

International career
2001	Slovenia U15	7	(1)
2004	Slovenia U19	1	(0)
2004–2005	Slovenia U20	2	(0)
2004–2006	Slovenia U21	12	(5)
2006	Slovenia B	1	(0)
2006–2018	Slovenia	90	(7)
- * Club domestic league appearances and goals

Valter Birsa (born 7 August 1986) is a Slovenian retired footballer who played as a winger.

== Club career ==
Born in Šempeter pri Gorici, he spent his childhood in Nova Gorica, Slovenia. Birsa's career began at the age of five, when he started playing for ND Bilje, the village club of Bilje near Nova Gorica. As he was a talented player, he was soon transferred first to Primorje, and then to Gorica at the age of 17.

=== Sochaux ===
In 2006, he signed for French club Sochaux in Ligue de Football Professionnel. While at Sochaux, he won the 2007 Coupe de France. The final game against Olympique de Marseille finished 2–2 and went to penalties, with Birsa scoring his penalty as his side emerged victorious.

==== Auxerre (loan) ====
On 22 January 2009, Auxerre signed him on a loan deal until June 2009 from Sochaux. He scored his first Auxerre goal against Olympique Lyonnais. On 29 May 2009, it was announced that Auxerre had made the loan permanent. In the 2010–11 season, Birsa scored a 23-yard free kick and his first UEFA Champions League goal against Ajax in the group stage. Ajax eventually won 2–1.

=== Genoa ===
On 2 February 2011, despite interest from big Premier league teams such as Liverpool and Fulham, Birsa signed a four-year contract with Serie A club Genoa. He made just nine appearances in his maiden season in Italy.

==== Torino (loan) ====
He joined Torino on 31 August 2012 on loan. At Torino, Birsa played 17 games, scoring 2 goals but did not do enough to convince Torino to sign him on a permanent deal so he returned to Genoa at the end of the season.

=== AC Milan ===
Birsa made the switch to AC Milan on 31 August 2013, in what was a straight swap deal which saw Luca Antonini move in the opposite direction. He was handed the number 14 shirt at Milan. He scored his first goal for the club on 28 September 2013 against Sampdoria to give the Rossoneri the win.

=== Chievo ===
He signed for Chievo on 9 July 2014 on loan. On 2 July 2015, Chievo signed Birsa outright in a three-year contract.

=== Cagliari ===
On 9 January 2019, Birsa signed with Serie A side Cagliari.

== International career ==
Birsa played for the Slovenia national team between 2006 and 2018. He scored his first goal for the national team on 9 September 2009 in a World Cup qualifying match against Poland, which Slovenia won 3–0. At the 2010 FIFA World Cup, Birsa struck a long-range curling shot in Slovenia's second group stage match against the United States. Slovenia drew that match 2–2.

He earned a total of 90 caps for the national team, scoring 7 goals. His final international was a March 2018 friendly match against Belarus.

== Personal life ==
Birsa was born in Šempeter pri Gorici, present day Slovenia. In 2012, he married his long-time girlfriend Mateja. He has a son named Nolan.

== Career statistics ==
=== Club ===
Appearances and goals by club, season and competition
Club	Season	League			National cup		League cup		Continental		Total	
Club	Season	Division	Apps	Goals	Apps	Goals	Apps	Goals	Apps	Goals	Apps	Goals
Primorje	2003–04	1. SNL	1	0	0	0	—		—		1	0
Gorica	2004–05	1. SNL	26	7	4	0	—		2	0	32	7
Gorica	2005–06	1. SNL	35	19	4	0	—		2	1	41	20
Gorica	Total		61	26	8	0	0	0	4	1	73	27
Sochaux	2006–07	Ligue 1	31	3	3	0	3	0	—		37	3
Sochaux	2007–08	Ligue 1	22	3	2	0	1	0	2	0	27	3
Sochaux	2008–09	Ligue 1	13	2	1	0	2	0	—		16	2
Sochaux	Total		66	8	6	0	6	0	2	0	80	8
Auxerre	2008–09	Ligue 1	15	1	0	0	0	0	—		15	1
Auxerre	2009–10	Ligue 1	35	3	4	0	0	0	—		39	3
Auxerre	2010–11	Ligue 1	33	5	0	0	2	0	7	1	42	6
Auxerre	Total		83	9	4	0	2	0	7	1	96	10
Genoa	2011–12	Serie A	9	0	3	2	—		—		12	2
Torino	2012–13	Serie A	17	2	1	0	—		—		18	2
AC Milan	2013–14	Serie A	15	2	2	0	—		4	0	21	2
Chievo	2014–15	Serie A	35	0	1	0	—		—		36	0
Chievo	2015–16	Serie A	35	6	1	0	—		—		36	6
Chievo	2016–17	Serie A	35	7	2	0	—		—		37	7
Chievo	2017–18	Serie A	35	3	1	1	—		—		36	4
Chievo	2018–19	Serie A	17	2	1	0	—		—		18	2
Chievo	Total		157	18	6	1	0	0	0	0	163	19
Cagliari	2018–19	Serie A	12	0	1	0	—		—		13	0
Cagliari	2019–20	Serie A	13	0	2	0	—		—		15	0
Cagliari	Total		25	0	3	0	0	0	0	0	28	0
Career total			434	65	33	3	8	0	17	2	492	70

=== International ===
Scores and results list Slovenia's goal tally first, score column indicates score after each Birsa goal.

List of international goals scored by Valter Birsa
No.	Date	Venue	Opponent	Score	Result	Competition
1	9 September 2009	Ljudski vrt, Maribor, Slovenia	Poland	3–0	3–0	2010 FIFA World Cup qualification
2	10 October 2009	Tehelné pole, Bratislava, Slovakia	Slovakia	1–0	2–0	2010 FIFA World Cup qualification
3	18 June 2010	Ellis Park Stadium, Johannesburg, South Africa	United States	1–0	2–2	2010 FIFA World Cup
4	7 June 2013	Laugardalsvöllur, Reykjavík, Iceland	Iceland	2–2	4–2	2014 FIFA World Cup qualification
5	19 November 2013	Arena Petrol, Celje, Slovenia	Canada	1–0	1–0	Friendly
6	9 October 2015	Stožice Stadium, Ljubljana, Slovenia	Lithuania	1–0	1–1	UEFA Euro 2016 Qualification
7	4 September 2017	Stožice Stadium, Ljubljana, Slovenia	Lithuania	4–0	4–0	2018 FIFA World Cup qualification

== Honours ==
Gorica

- Slovenian PrvaLiga: 2004–05, 2005–06

Sochaux

- Coupe de France: 2006–07

Individual

- Slovenian Footballer of the Year: 2010

== See also ==
- Slovenian international players
