= Lionel Letizi =

French footballer (born 1973)

Personal information
- Full name: Lionel Letizi
- Date of birth: 28 May 1973 (age 53)
- Place of birth: Nice, Alpes-Maritimes, France
- Height: 1.87 m (6 ft 2 in)
- Position: Goalkeeper

Youth career
- 1989–1992: Nice

Senior career*
Years	Team	Apps	(Gls)
1992–1996	Nice	107	(0)
1996–2000	Metz	131	(0)
2000–2006	Paris Saint-Germain	145	(0)
2006–2007	Rangers	7	(0)
2007–2011	Nice	30	(0)
Total		420	(0)

International career
1996	France Olympic	4	(0)
1997–2001	France	4	(0)
- * Club domestic league appearances and goals

Lionel Letizi (born 28 May 1973) is a French former professional footballer who played as a goalkeeper.

== Early life and club career ==
=== France ===
Lionel Letizi was born on 28 May 1973 in Nice, Alpes-Maritimes. He took his first steps as a professional player with OGC Nice where his team won the French second division in 1994. Upon reaching the French first division he was observed by a number of football clubs before joining FC Metz in 1996. At this new club, he and his team became runner-ups in the French first division in 1998 and finalists of the French League Cup in 1999. The chance to take a step up arrived when he joined Paris Saint-Germain in 2000, which enabled him to play in the UEFA Champions League. He remained first choice at PSG for six years, but the signing of Mickael Landreau instigated his departure.

=== Move to Scotland ===
On 16 June 2006, he moved to Rangers on a free transfer. On 13 August, his blunder led directly to a 1–1 draw with Dunfermline. Letizi soon redeemed himself in the next game, which saw Rangers achieve a 2–0 win against the Hearts. Unfortunately for the team, this match resulted in an injury for Letizi. After two months on the sidelines, Letizi controversially made an automatic return to the side despite impressive performances from his replacement Allan McGregor.

Manager Paul Le Guen had made it clear at the start of the season that Letizi was going to be number one, which was not entirely unexpected. But the decision was soon put under dubious light when a fumble on 14 October 2006 gave Inverness Caledonian Thistle an unforeseen 1–0 win at Ibrox Stadium, and left Rangers 10 points behind Celtic after just ten Scottish Premier League matches.

After the departure of Le Guen, Letizi's future at Rangers was uncertain and he was released from the club on 30 January 2007 having featured in just eight matches during his six-month stay. He then played for OGC Nice until his retirement in 2011.

== International career ==
Despite having been capped four times for the France national team, he never managed to displace Fabien Barthez. He was in France's preliminary squad of 28 players for the 1998 FIFA World Cup on home soil, but was left out by head coach Aimé Jacquet just before the tournament began. France went on to win.

== Career statistics ==
=== Club ===
Appearances and goals by club, season and competition
Club	Season	League			Cup (Note: Includes Coupe de France)		League cup (Note: Includes Coupe de la Ligue)		Europe		Other		Total	
Club	Season	Division	Apps	Goals	Apps	Goals	Apps	Goals	Apps	Goals	Apps	Goals	Apps	Goals
Nice	1992–93	Division 2	3	0	0	0	—		—		0	0	3	0
Nice	1993–94	Division 2	36	0	0	0	—		—		—		36	0
Nice	1994–95	Division 1	37	0	1	0	1	0	—		—		39	0
Nice	1995–96	Division 1	34	0	2	0	1	0	—		—		37	0
Nice	Total		110	0	3	0	2	0	—		0	0	115	0
Metz	1996–97	Division 1	32	0	2	0	1	0	5 (Note: Appearance(s) in UEFA Cup)	0	—		40	0
Metz	1997–98	Division 1	34	0	2	0	3	0	4	0	—		43	0
Metz	1998–99	Division 1	34	0	3	0	5	0	4 (Note: Two appearances in UEFA Champions League, two appearances in UEFA Cup)	0	—		46	0
Metz	1999–2000	Division 1	31	0	3	0	0	0	6 (Note: Appearance(s) in UEFA Intertoto Cup)	0	—		40	0
Metz	Total		131	0	10	0	9	0	19	0	—		169	0
Paris Saint-Germain	2000–01	Division 1	25	0	0	0	1	0	12 (Note: Appearance(s) in UEFA Champions League)	0	—		38	0
Paris Saint-Germain	2001–02	Division 1	28	0	0	0	3	0	12 (Note: Eight appearances in UEFA Intertoto Cup, four appearances in UEFA Cup)	0	—		43	0
Paris Saint-Germain	2002–03	Ligue 1	26	0	0	0	0	0	6	0	—		32	0
Paris Saint-Germain	2003–04	Ligue 1	6	0	6	0	0	0	—		—		12	0
Paris Saint-Germain	2004–05	Ligue 1	33	0	1	0	0	0	6	0	0	0	40	0
Paris Saint-Germain	2005–06	Ligue 1	27	0	4	0	0	0	—		—		31	0
Paris Saint-Germain	Total		145	0	11	0	4	0	36	0	0	0	196	0
Rangers	2006–07	Scottish Premier League	7	0	—		0	0	1	0	—		8	0
Nice	2006–07	Ligue 1	1	0	—		—		—		—		1	0
Nice	2007–08	Ligue 1	10	0	2	0	2	0	—		—		14	0
Nice	2008–09	Ligue 1	13	0	2	0	2	0	—		—		17	0
Nice	2009–10	Ligue 1	2	0	0	0	1	0	—		—		3	0
Nice	2010–11	Ligue 1	4	0	5	0	0	0	—		—		9	0
Nice	Total		30	0	9	0	5	0	—		—		44	0
Career total			423	0	32	0	21	0	56	0	0	0	536	0

=== International ===
Appearances and goals by national team and year
National team	Year	Apps	Goals
France	1997	1	0
France	1998	1	0
France	2000	1	0
France	2001	1	0
Total		4	0

== Honours ==
Nice

- Division 2: 1993–94

Metz

- Coupe de la Ligue runner-up: 1998–99

Paris Saint-Germain

- UEFA Intertoto Cup: 2001
- Coupe de France: 2003–04, 2005–06
