= Abasse Ba =

Senegalese footballer (born 1976)

Personal information
- Date of birth: 12 July 1976 (age 50)
- Place of birth: Pelelkindessa, Senegal
- Height: 1.88 m (6 ft 2 in)
- Position: Defender

Senior career*
Years	Team	Apps	(Gls)
1998–2001	Louhans-Cuiseaux	64	(2)
2001–2007	Dijon	152	(4)
2007–2011	Le Havre	53	(0)
2009	→ Al Rayyan (loan)		
Total		269	(6)
- * Club domestic league appearances and goals

Abasse Ba (born 12 July 1976) is a Senegalese former professional footballer who played as a defender. Apart from a loan stint at Al Rayyan, he spent all of his professional in France, with Louhans-Cuiseaux FC, Dijon FCO, and Le Havre AC.

== Career ==
Born in Pelelkindessa, Senegal, Ba began his career in France with Louhans-Cuiseaux. After three years with the club he moved to Dijon FC. At Dijon he played 152 games scoring four goals. After six years there he left and signed with Le Havre AC.

On 27 April 2009, Ba joined Al Rayyan on loan.
