= Grenoble Foot 38 =

French football club

Grenoble
- Full name: Grenoble Foot 38
- Nickname: GF38
- Short name: GF38
- Founded: 1911; 115 years ago as Football Club de Grenoble
- Stadium: Stade des Alpes
- Capacity: 20,068
- Owner: Stéphane Rosnoblet
- President: Stéphane Rosnoblet
- Head coach: Olivier Frapolli
- League: Ligue 2
- 2025–26: Ligue 2, 12th of 18
- Website: gf38.fr
Home colours	Away colours	Third colours

Grenoble Foot 38, commonly referred to as simply Grenoble or GF38, is a French association football club based in Grenoble. The club plays its home matches at the Stade des Alpes, a sports complex based in the heart of the city, and wears white and blue.

The original incarnation of the club was founded in 1911 and, in 1997, was formed into the club that exists today as a result of a merger. Grenoble currently plays in Ligue 2, the second level of French football, after having gone into bankruptcy and relegation to the fifth level of French football in 2011.

== History ==
The club was founded in 1911 as Football Club de Grenoble. In 1997, a merger of Olympique Grenoble Isère and Norcap Olympique led to the current Grenoble Foot 38 incarnation. Olympique Grenoble Isère played in Ligue 1 in the 1960–61 and 1962–63 seasons.

Until 2004, Grenoble Foot was owned by the municipality of Grenoble. In that year, the club was acquired by Index Holdings, a Japanese mobile software company, becoming the first French football club with foreign owners. The price of the takeover was around €2 million. The new owners invested in the Stade des Alpes, a new ground with an initial capacity of 20,000 which opened in February 2008.

Grenoble Foot finished the 2007–08 Ligue 2 season in third place, thus returning to Ligue 1 for the first time since 1963. In the 2008–09 Ligue 1 season, Grenoble finished 13th. Grenoble also reached the semi-final of the Coupe de France for the first and only time, after beating AS Monaco 2–0 at home in the quarter-final. Grenoble then lost 0-1 to Stade Rennais in the semi-final.

In the 2009–10 Ligue 1 season, Grenoble Foot were eventually relegated with six games remaining amidst severe financial problems.

The professional football club was liquidated in July 2011 with debts of €2.9 million, and relegated administratively to Championnat de France Amateur 2, the fifth tier. Index provided false financial statements during their ownership of the club. Grenoble Foot was once again owned by the municipality of Grenoble until 2015 when the current owner - Stéphane Rosnoblet - acquired the club.

As an amateur side, Grenoble Foot won promotion from Championnat de France Amateur 2 at the first attempt in 2012, and were champions of the 2016–17 Championnat de France Amateur, returning to Championnat National for the 2017–18 season.

Grenoble Foot secured their promotion to Ligue 2 on 27 May 2018, after an aggregate play-off victory over Bourg-en-Bresse.

=== Name changes ===
- Football Club de Grenoble (1911–1977)
- Football Club Association Sportive de Grenoble (1977–1984)
- Football Club de Grenoble Dauphiné (1984–1990)
- Football Club de Grenoble Isère (1990–1992)
- Football Club de Grenoble Jojo Isère (1992–1993)
- Olympique Grenoble Isère (1993–1997)
- Grenoble Foot 38 (1997–present)

== Players ==
=== Current squad ===
As of 7 September 2026

Note: Flags indicate national team as defined under FIFA eligibility rules; some limited exceptions apply. Players may hold more than one non-FIFA nationality.

No.	Pos.	Nation	Player
1	GK	FRA	Alexandre Olliero
2	FW	SEN	Moussa Djitté
3	DF	NED	Farouq Limouri
5	DF	FRA	Clément Vidal
6	MF	FRA	Yohann Magnin
8	MF	FRA	Lucas Bernadou
9	FW	FRA	Arthur Lallias
10	MF	FRA	Baptiste Mouazan
11	FW	BFA	Mamady Bangré
12	FW	FRA	Ugo Bonnet
14	MF	USA	Mael Corboz
16	GK	FRA	Bobby Allain
17	FW	ITA	Leonardo Cerri
19	DF	FRA	Nesta Zahui
21	DF	CIV	Owen Kouassi (on loan from Lecce)

No.	Pos.	Nation	Player
22	DF	CIV	Ange-Loïc N'Gatta
23	FW	NED	Dillon Hoogewerf
25	GK	FRA	Théo Borne
27	DF	FRA	Matthéo Xantippe
30	MF	SEN	Samba Lélé Diba
34	FW	POR	Zé Leite
37	FW	FRA	Mohamed Bechikh
43	DF	FRA	Aurélien Pelon
44	MF	FRA	Owen Martinez-Jullien
46	MF	FRA	Jules Mouton
47	FW	FRA	Kyliann Fofana
48	DF	FRA	Sakhalou Niakaté
92	FW	FRA	Jean-Guy Akpa Akpro (on loan from Pro Vercelli)
97	DF	GLP	Yvann Maçon

=== Notable players ===
- (France) Youri Djorkaeff
- (France) Florian Thauvin

== Coaching staff ==
Position	Name
Head coach	(France) Franck Rizzetto
Assistant coach	(Uruguay) Francisco Palladino (France) Frédéric Guéguen
Goalkeeping coach	(France) Arnaud Genty
Physical coach	(France) Michaël Diaferia (France) Mathieu Eyssard
Video analyst	(France) Adrien Bister
Doctor	(France) Eric Garrel
Physiotherapist	(France) Morgan Renaudin (France) Ugo san Julian
Team manager	(France) Grégory Kurkeden

== Managers ==
- Jules Dewaquez (1945–1946)
- R. Lacoste (1953–1954)
- G. Dupraz (1957–1958)
- A. Fornetti (1958–1963)
- Albert Batteux (1963–1967)
- R. Abad (1967–1970)
- René Gardien (1970–1971)
- J. Donnard (1971–1972)
- R. Garcin (1972–1975)
- Jean Deloffre (1975–1978)
- R. Belloni (1978–1980)
- Michel Lafranceschina (1980–1981)
- Jean Djorkaeff (1981–1983)
- Claude Le Roy (1983–1985)
- Robert Buigues (1985–1986)
- Christian Dalger (1986–1989)
- Patrick Parizon (1989–1990)
- Noël Tosi (1990–1991)
- Bernard Simondi (1991–1993)
- B. David (1993–1994)
- C. Letard (1994–1995)
- É. Geraldes (1995–1996)
- Bernard Simondi (1996–1997)
- Alain Michel (1997–2001)
- Marc Westerloppe (2001–2002)
- Alain Michel (2002–2004)
- Thierry Goudet (2004–2006)
- Yvon Pouliquen (2006–2007)
- Mehmed Baždarević (2007–2010)
- Yvon Pouliquen (2010–2011)
- Olivier Saragaglia (2012–2015)
- Jean-Louis Garcia (2015–2016)
- Olivier Guégan (2016–2018)
- Philippe Hinschberger (2018–2021)
- Maurizio Jacobacci (2021)
- Vincent Hognon (2021–2024)
- Laurent Peyrelade (2024)
- Oswald Tanchot (2024)
- Franck Rizzetto (2025–Present)

== Honours ==
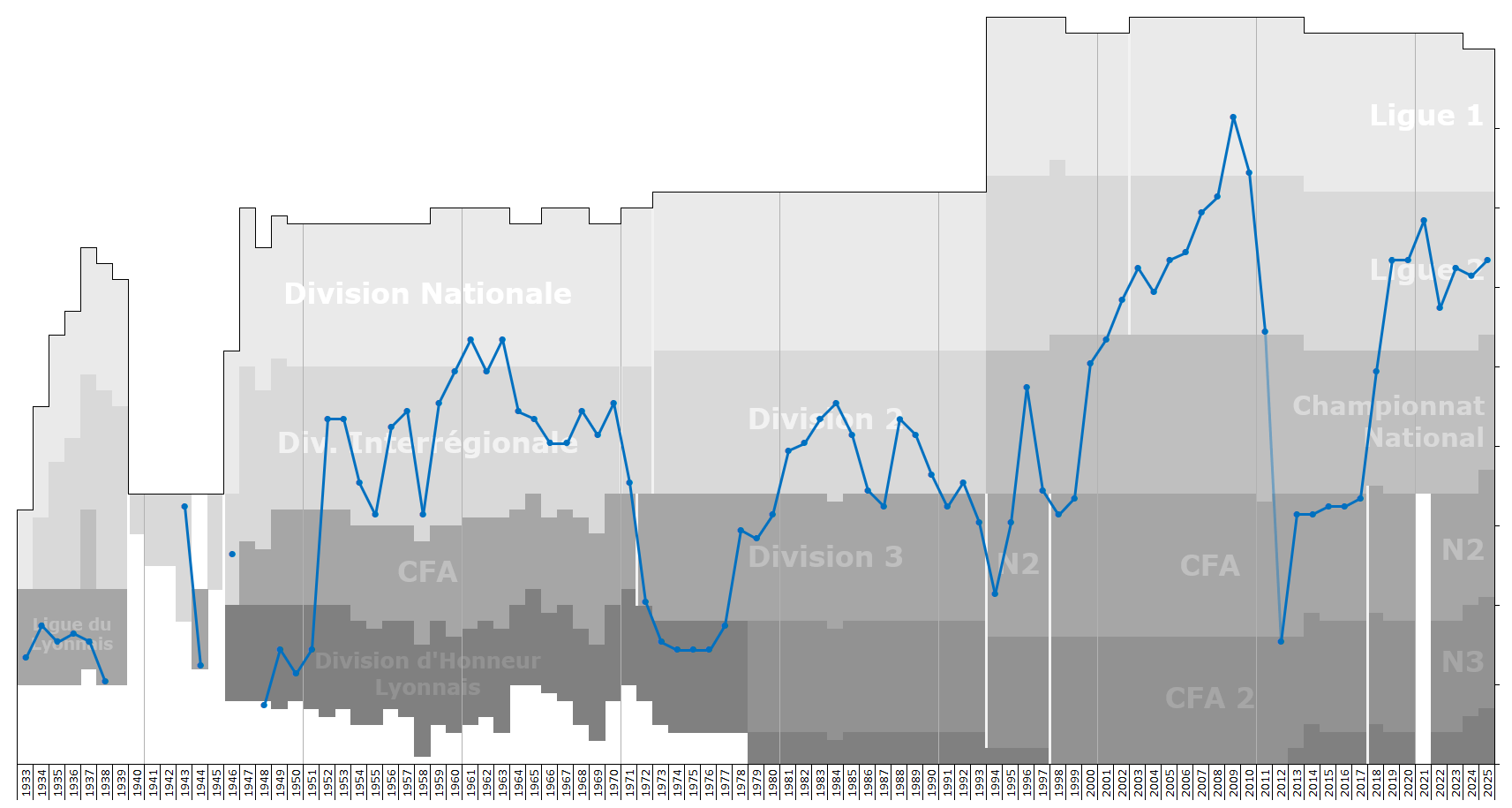
Historical league performance chart of Grenoble Foot 38

- Ligue 2
  - Champions: 1960, 1962
- Championnat National
  - Champions: 2001
- Coppa delle Alpi
  - Runners-up: 1963
- Coupe Gambardella
  - Runners-up: 1987, 1990
