= Ronald Zubar =

French footballer (born 1985)

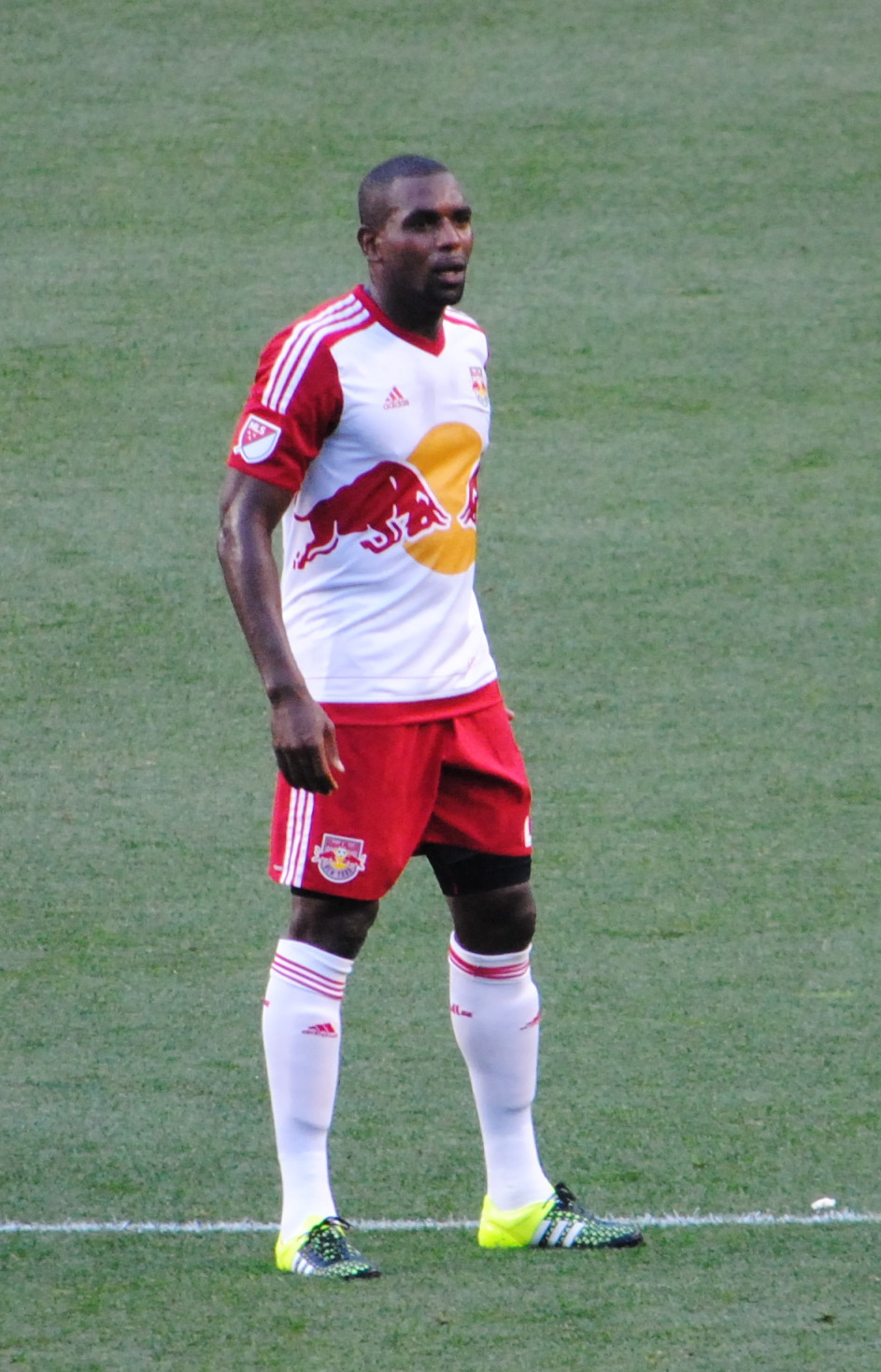
- Zubar playing for New York Red Bulls in 2015

Personal information
- Full name: Ronald Raymond Zubar
- Date of birth: 20 September 1985 (age 41)
- Place of birth: Les Abymes, Guadeloupe, France
- Height: 1.86 m (6 ft 1 in)
- Position: Defender

Youth career
- –2002: Caen

Senior career*
Years	Team	Apps	(Gls)
2002–2006	Caen	96	(2)
2006–2009	Marseille	72	(2)
2009–2013	Wolverhampton Wanderers	61	(3)
2013–2015	Ajaccio	38	(2)
2015–2016	New York Red Bulls	33	(3)
2015	→ New York Red Bulls II	1	(0)
2017	Red Star	0	(0)
Total		301	(12)

International career
2000–2001	France U16	7	(0)
2002–2003	France U17	10	(0)
2004–2007	France U21	15	(2)
2014	Guadeloupe	2	(0)
Medal record
Men's football
Representing France
UEFA European Under-17 Championship
Runner-up	2002
- * Club domestic league appearances and goals

Ronald Raymond Zubar (born 20 September 1985) is a French former professional footballer who played as a defender.

Zubar's efforts at French club Stade Malherbe Caen earned him a move to Olympique de Marseille in 2006. His time at Marseille ended sourly though, after some individual errors saw fans turn against him and him relegated to the sidelines. He found an exit in English Premier League club Wolverhampton Wanderers, for whom he signed in 2009 and remained until 2013.

== Club career ==
=== Caen ===
Born in Les Abymes, Guadeloupe, Zubar began his professional football career at Ligue 2 side Stade Malherbe Caen and was part of their youth team, which were runners-up in the 2001 Gambardella Cup. He made his first team debut for Caen against fellow Ligue 2 side Lorient on 8 March 2003, which ended in a goalless draw.

Zubar sustained a run of games in the first team and helped his team win promotion to Ligue 1 in the 2003–04 season. He was part of the team that reached the French League Cup Final in 2005. However, Caen was relegated at the end of the season, finishing in 18th place in Ligue 1. Zubar remained with the club for another season as he tried to help them back into Ligue 1, but this was unsuccessful. Despite Caen's failure to get promotion, he was named as the best defensive midfielder in Ligue 2's Team of the Year. He made a total of 96 appearances for Caen, scoring two goals.

=== Marseille ===
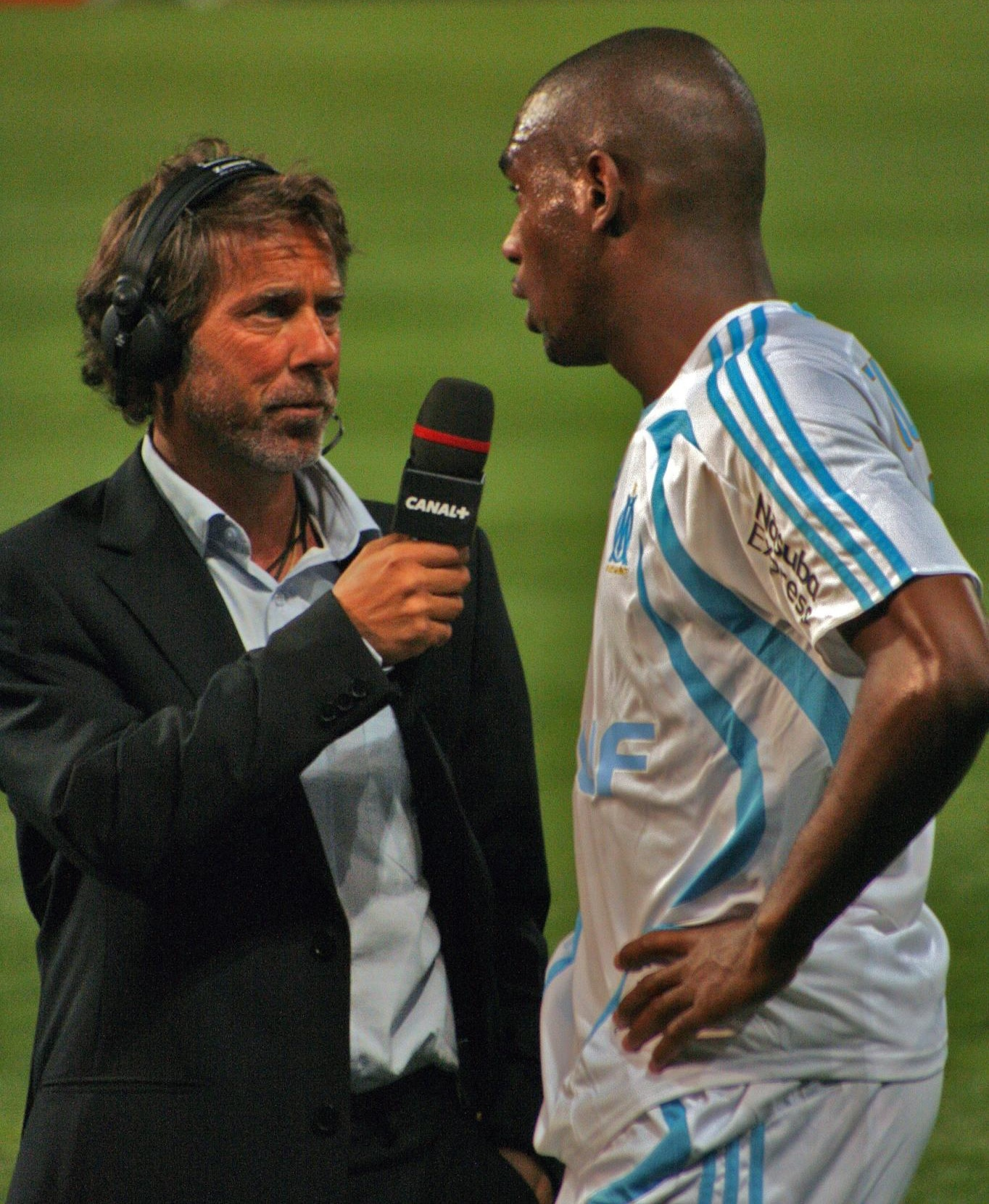
Zubar with Olympique de Marseille in 2008

After speculation over his future at Caen, being linked with English Premier League team Arsenal and fellow Ligue 1 rivals Lyon and Bordeaux, Zubar finally joined Olympique de Marseille on 15 June 2006, signing a four-year contract for an undisclosed fee. His first season with the team saw him narrowly miss out on two honours as Marseille finished runners-up in Ligue 1 to Lyon, and lost the French Cup Final; Zubar himself missed the decisive penalty in the shootout in the final against Sochaux, after a 2–2 draw.

At the start of the 2007–08 season, he was converted to defence, playing various games at centre back and right back, instead of his previous defensive midfield role. This campaign was hard for Zubar as he found himself under pressure from fans after several costly mistakes in defence, in a season that only brought the club third place in Ligue 1. He made a total of 98 appearances for the club, scoring three goals, before leaving the club in the summer of 2009.

=== Wolverhampton Wanderers ===
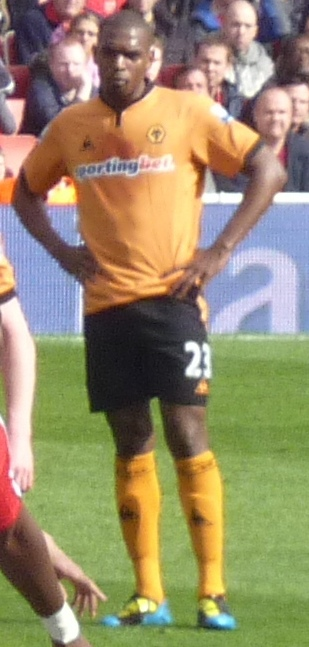
Zubar playing for Wolverhampton Wanderers in 2010

On 4 July 2009, Zubar signed for newly promoted English Premier League club Wolverhampton Wanderers on a four-year deal for an undisclosed fee, believed to be in the region of £2.5 million. After a long period of adjustment due to the language barrier and a newborn child in France, he finally made his Premier League debut on 17 October 2009 in a 1–1 draw at Everton, almost two months after he had made his club debut during a League Cup tie against Swindon on 25 August 2009. He scored his first Wolves goal in a 3–1 win at relegation rivals West Ham on 23 March 2010, as the team progressed toward retaining their top flight survival.

Zubar made a further 18 appearances for Wolves during the 2010–11 campaign, but his season was ended two months early after he underwent back surgery. This injury kept him out of first team contention until November 2011, but soon after his return he suffered a further injury setback when he damaged his knee and so missed several more months. He played in the final months of the season – receiving a red card in a defeat to Manchester United – which ended with the club suffering relegation to the Championship.

During the close season Zubar said that he wanted to remain at Wolves despite their relegation and was keen to extend his contract that had one year left to run. However, new manager Ståle Solbakken rarely used the defender, and revealed that he was content for him to leave in the January transfer window. Although Solbakken was soon sacked and his replacement Dean Saunders immediately recalled Zubar to the starting XI, he still exited the club during January 2013 after making 69 appearances (scoring four goals) in total for the club.

=== Return to France ===
On 30 January 2013, Ligue 1 club Ajaccio announced that Zubar had joined them in an eighteen-month deal after Wolves agreed to release him from his contract. He made a total of 38 league appearances for Ajaccio, scoring two goals.

=== New York Red Bulls ===
On 27 January 2015, the New York Red Bulls of Major League Soccer announced that they had signed Zubar. Zubar made his debut for New York on 8 March 2015 appearing as a starter in a 1–1 draw at Sporting Kansas City. After being out for a couple of months due to injury, Zubar returned to the starting lineup on 17 June 2015 scoring New York's second goal in a 3–0 US Open Cup victory over Atlanta Silverbacks. After another month away due to injury Zubar made his return to the field on 12 August 2015, this time starting for New York Red Bulls II in a 1–1 draw against Charlotte Independence.

On 24 July 2016, during the third Hudson River Derby match of the season; Zubar scored his club's second goal of the match en route to a 4–1 victory over New York City FC.

Zubar was released by the Red Bulls at the end of the 2016 season.

== International career ==
Zubar has represented France at under-16, under-17, under-18 and under-21 level. He was part of the French under-17 side which reached the final of the 2002 European Under-17 Championships.

He has represented Guadeloupe, which is the French overseas department he is originally from, at senior international level.

== Personal life ==
His younger brother, Stéphane and his cousin Claude Dielna are also professional footballers.

== Career statistics ==
=== Club ===
Appearances and goals by club, season and competition
Club	Season	League			National cup (Note: Includes Coupe de France, FA Cup, US Open Cup)		League cup (Note: Includes Coupe de la Ligue, Football League Cup, MLS Cup Playoffs)		Continental		Total	
Club	Season	Division	Apps	Goals	Apps	Goals	Apps	Goals	Apps	Goals	Apps	Goals
Caen	2002–03	Ligue 2	7	0	–		–		–		7	0
Caen	2003–04	Ligue 2	25	1	2	0	–		–		27	1
Caen	2004–05	Ligue 1	34	1	1	0	4	0	–		39	1
Caen	2005–06	Ligue 1	30	0	1	1	2	0	–		33	1
Caen	Total		96	2	4	1	6	0	0	0	106	3
Marseille	2006–07	Ligue 1	34	0	5	0	2	0	3	1	44	1
Marseille	2007–08	Ligue 1	21	1	2	0	1	0	3	0	27	1
Marseille	2008–09	Ligue 1	17	1	2	0	1	0	9	0	29	1
Marseille	Total		72	2	9	0	4	0	15	1	100	3
Wolverhampton Wanderers	2009–10	Premier League	23	1	2	1	1	0	–		26	2
Wolverhampton Wanderers	2010–11	Premier League	15	1	2	0	1	0	–		18	1
Wolverhampton Wanderers	2011–12	Premier League	15	1	–		–		–		15	1
Wolverhampton Wanderers	2012–13	Championship	8	0	–		2	0	–		10	0
Wolverhampton Wanderers	Total		61	3	4	1	4	0	0	0	69	4
Ajaccio	2012–13	Ligue 1	15	1	–		–		–		15	1
Ajaccio	2013–14	Ligue 1	15	1	1	0	–		–		16	1
Ajaccio	2014–15	Ligue 2	8	0	–		–		–		8	0
Ajaccio	Total		38	2	1	0	0	0	0	0	39	2
New York Red Bulls	2015	Major League Soccer	12	1	1	1	4	0	–		17	2
New York Red Bulls	2016	Major League Soccer	21	2	2	0	–		–		23	2
New York Red Bulls	Total		33	3	3	1	4	0	0	0	40	4
Career total			300	12	21	3	18	0	15	1	354	16

== Honours ==
New York Red Bulls

- MLS Supporters' Shield : 2015
