= Bruno Rodriguez (footballer) =

French footballer (born 1972)

Personal information
- Date of birth: 25 November 1972 (age 53)
- Place of birth: Bastia, France
- Height: 1.80 m (5 ft 11 in)
- Position: Forward

Senior career*
Years	Team	Apps	(Gls)
1989–1992	Monaco B		
1992–1993	Monaco	3	(0)
1993–1996	Bastia	61	(24)
1996	Strasbourg	14	(2)
1997–1999	Metz	58	(23)
1999–2000	Paris Saint-Germain	18	(6)
1999	→ Bradford City (loan)	2	(0)
2000–2004	Lens	23	(1)
2000–2001	→ Guingamp (loan)	29	(12)
2001–2002	→ Rayo Vallecano (loan)	2	(0)
2002–2003	→ Ajaccio (loan)	30	(6)
2004	→ Metz (loan)	8	(1)
2004–2005	Clermont	11	(1)
Total		259	(76)
- * Club domestic league appearances and goals

Bruno Rodriguez (born 25 November 1972) is a French former professional footballer who played as a forward.

== Club career ==
Born in Bastia, Rodriguez spent his early career with Monaco B, Monaco, Bastia, Strasbourg, Metz and Paris Saint-Germain.

He joined newly promoted Bradford City in the English Premier League on a season-long loan from PSG in September 1999, for a loan fee of £500,000, but after making five appearances in all competitions, totalling 55 minutes of play, the loan was cancelled in October.

He later played for Lens, Guingamp, Rayo Vallecano, Ajaccio, Metz (again), and Clermont.

After retiring he returned to Corsica, and was living in Bastia as of December 2016.

== International career ==
Rodriguez was born in France to a Spanish father and Corsican mother. He was a France B international.

== Personal life ==
In March 2022 the French players' union UNFP confirmed that Rodriguez had undergone amputation of a leg due to chronic pain he had been suffering from since retirement from playing.
