= Ludovic Asuar =

French football player (born 1976)

Personal information
- Date of birth: 26 October 1976 (age 50)
- Place of birth: Marseille, France
- Height: 1.83 m (6 ft 0 in)
- Position: Midfielder

Senior career*
Years	Team	Apps	(Gls)
1994–1998	Marseille	68	(5)
1998–2001	Metz	49	(1)
2001–2004	Sedan	80	(13)
2004–2007	Dijon	82	(10)
2007–2009	AC Ajaccio	55	(4)
2009–2010	SO Cassis Carnoux	13	(1)
Total		347	(34)

International career
1997	France U-21	5	(0)
- * Club domestic league appearances and goals

Ludovic Asuar (born 26 October 1976) is a French former professional footballer who played as a midfielder for Olympique de Marseille, FC Metz, AC Ajaccio, Dijon FCO, CS Sedan Ardennes, and SO Cassis Carnoux.
