= Philippe Brunel =

French footballer (born 1973)

Personal information
- Date of birth: 28 February 1973 (age 53)
- Place of birth: Boulogne-sur-Mer, France
- Height: 1.77 m (5 ft 10 in)
- Position: Midfielder

Youth career
- Boulogne

Senior career*
Years	Team	Apps	(Gls)
1991–2001	Lens	158	(9)
1995–1996	→ Gueugnon (loan)	34	(4)
2001–2002	Marseille	11	(0)
2002–2005	Lille	108	(16)
2005–2007	Sochaux	28	(0)
2007–2011	Angers	90	(10)
2011–2012	Valence	12	(0)
Total		441	(39)
- * Club domestic league appearances and goals

Philippe Brunel (born 28 February 1973) is a French former professional footballer who played as a midfielder. He was a midfielder or playmaker with a wide range of passing.

== Career ==
=== Lens ===
Brunel began his career at RC Lens in 1991. From then until 1995, he made 27 appearances for the club, scoring one goal before moving to FC Gueugnon on a year-long loan in 1995. He made 34 appearances and scored 4 goals for Gueugnon; upon the completion of his loan, he returned to Lens.

Upon his return, Brunel featured much more prominently in the Lens squad; over five years from 1996 to 2001, he played 131 times and scored 8 goals in Ligue 1. He contributed 33 appearances as his side won 1997–98 French Division 1. The following season he played as a substitute in the final as they won the 1998-99 Coupe de la Ligue. He also featured in the club's UEFA Cup campaign in the 1999–2000 season, making two appearances - a 1–2 defeat to 1. FC Kaiserslautern on 25 November 1999 in the home leg of the 3rd-round tie, and the 1–4 victory in the away leg.

=== Marseille ===
Brunel's performances for Lens earned him a free transfer in 2001 to Olympique de Marseille, however as with his time at Gueugnon his Marseille career did not go to plan; having made only 11 appearances for his new club, he was transferred in January 2002 to Lille for £880,000.

=== Lille ===
During the second half of the season, Brunel made a further 11 appearances for Lille, scoring once, in addition to two appearances in the UEFA Cup - both legs of the last-16 tie with Borussia Dortmund on 21 and 28 February 2002.

From then until 2005, he would make a total of 118 appearances for Lille and score 16 goals in the process; in 2005 he was transferred to Sochaux, however he made only 28 appearances in two years with the club before leaving for Angers SCO in 2007. While at Sochaux he played as a substitute as they won the 2007 Coupe de France Final. The game finished 2-2 and went to penalties, and Brunel scored his penalty in the shootout as his side emerged victorious.

=== Angers ===
Over four years with Angers, Brunel scored 10 goals in a total of 99 league appearances in Ligue 2; having featured regularly until 2010 but not made a single appearance in the 2010–11 season, he retired from professional football and moved into amateur football with AS Valence in the summer of 2011.

== Career statistics ==
Appearances and goals by club, season and competition
Club	Season	League			Coupe de France		Coupe de la Ligue		Total	
Club	Season	Division	Apps	Goals	Apps	Goals	Apps	Goals	Apps	Goals
Lens	1991–92	Ligue 1	0	0	0	0	0	0	0	0
Lens	1992–93	Ligue 1	0	0	0	0	0	0	0	0
Lens	1993–94	Ligue 1	9	0	0	0	0	0	9	0
Lens	1994–95	Ligue 1	18	1	0	0	0	0	18	1
Lens	1996–97	Ligue 1	28	2	0	0	0	0	28	2
Lens	1997–98	Ligue 1	33	1	0	0	0	0	33	1
Lens	1998–99	Ligue 1	17	2	0	0	0	0	17	2
Lens	1999–2000	Ligue 1	32	2	0	0	0	0	32	2
Lens	2000–01	Ligue 1	21	1	0	0	0	0	21	1
Lens	Total		158	9	0	0	0	0	158	9
Gueugnon (loan)	1995–96	Ligue 1	34	4	0	0	0	0	34	4
Marseille	2001–02	Ligue 1	11	0	0	0	0	0	11	0
Lille	2001–02	Ligue 1	11	1	0	0	0	0	11	1
Lille	2002–03	Ligue 1	36	3	0	0	0	0	36	3
Lille	2003–04	Ligue 1	34	3	0	0	0	0	34	3
Lille	2004–05	Ligue 1	37	9	0	0	0	0	37	9
Lille	Total		108	16	0	0	0	0	108	16
Sochaux	2005–06	Ligue 1	19	0	0	0	0	0	19	0
Sochaux	2006–07	Ligue 1	9	0	0	0	0	0	9	0
Sochaux	Total		28	0	0	0	0	0	28	0
Angers	2007–08	Ligue 2	31	4	0	0	0	0	31	4
Angers	2008–09	Ligue 2	36	3	0	0	1	0	37	3
Angers	2009–10	Ligue 2	32	3	2	0	1	0	35	3
Angers	2010–11	Ligue 2	0	0	0	0	0	0	0	0
Angers	Total		90	10	2	0	2	0	94	10
Valence	2011–12	CFA 2	12	0	3	0	0	0	15	0
Career total			441	39	5	0	2	0	448	39

== Honours ==
Lens

- Division 1: 1997–98
- Coupe de la Ligue: 1998–99

Lille

- UEFA Intertoto Cup: 2004

Sochaux

- Coupe de France: 2006–07
