= Philippe Gaillot (footballer) =

French footballer (born 1965)

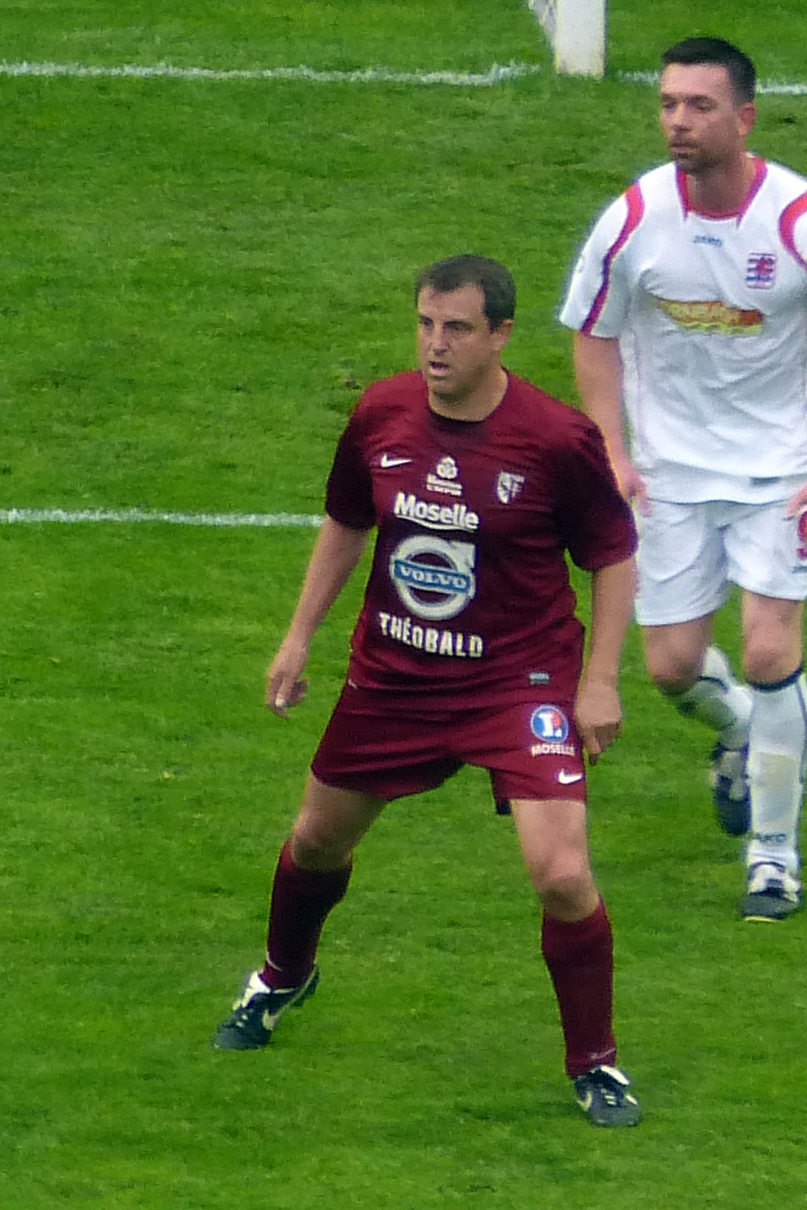

Personal information
- Date of birth: 28 February 1965 (age 61)
- Place of birth: Château-Salins, France
- Height: 1.82 m (6 ft 0 in)
- Position: Defender

Youth career
- Metz

Senior career*
Years	Team	Apps	(Gls)
1984–2002	Metz	424	(23)
1992–1993	→ Valenciennes (loan)	33	(1)
Total		457	(24)
- * Club domestic league appearances and goals

Philippe Gaillot (French: [filip ɡajo]; born 28 February 1965) is a French former professional footballer who played as a defender. While at Metz, he played in the final as they won the 1995–96 Coupe de la Ligue.
