= Franck Rizzetto =

French footballer (born 1971)

Personal information
- Date of birth: 29 March 1971 (age 55)
- Place of birth: Périgueux, France
- Height: 1.71 m (5 ft 7 in)
- Position: Midfielder

Senior career*
Years	Team	Apps	(Gls)
1987–1989	Toulouse Fontaines Club		
1989–1998	Montpellier	162	(11)
1991–1992	→ Olympique Alès (loan)	33	(2)
1998–2000	Metz	42	(1)
2000–2002	Nîmes	66	(6)
2002–2003	Cannes		
2004–2007	Rodez		

Managerial career
- 2005–2011: Rodez
- 2011–2013: Paris Saint-Germain U-23
- 2013–2014: Les Herbiers
- 2025–2026: Grenoble
- * Club domestic league appearances and goals

Franck Rizzetto (born 29 March 1971) is a French football manager and former professional player.
