= Gunter Van Handenhoven =

Belgian footballer and manager

Personal information
- Date of birth: 16 December 1978 (age 47)
- Place of birth: Sint-Niklaas, Belgium
- Height: 1.75 m (5 ft 9 in)
- Position: Winger

Team information
- Current team: KV Mechelen (asst. coach)

Youth career
- 1986–1993: Sint-Niklaas
- 1993–1996: KV Mechelen

Senior career*
Years	Team	Apps	(Gls)
1996–1997	KV Mechelen	3	(0)
1997–1998	Gent	17	(2)
1998–2002	Metz	59	(1)
2003	Gent	8	(0)
2003–2005	La Louvière	42	(4)
2005–2007	Lokeren	14	(1)
2007	→ Sint-Niklaas (loan)	3	(0)
2007–2008	Al Ahli		
2008–2009	Roeselare	10	(0)
2009–2010	KFCO Wilrijk		

International career
1997	Belgium U21		

Managerial career
- 2010–2012: Anderlecht U16
- 2012–2019: Anderlecht (team manager)
- 2021-2022: Kortrijk (asst.)
- 2022-: KV Mechelen (asst.)
- * Club domestic league appearances and goals

Gunter Van Handenhoven (born 16 December 1978) is a Belgian retired footballer and former team manager of Anderlecht. Since 18 October 2021 he was the assistant coach of Kortrijk and later got the same position at KV Mechelen.

== Club career ==
Van Handenhoven was born in Sint-Niklaas. He made an early breakthrough in Belgian First Division and soon he was transferred to Metz. But he came back in the Belgian championship in 2002. In 2008, he returned to the Belgian First Division to play for Roeselare.

== International career ==
Van Handenhoven played for Belgium U21 national team. He played at the 1997 FIFA World Youth Championship.

== Personal life ==
Van Handenhoven was for four years married to model Ann Van Elsen, with whom he has daughter June. He announced in April 2015 that his girlfriend Stephanie was pregnant of his second child.

He is the brother of Sandrine Van Handenhoven, a singer, who ended fourth in Idool 2004.
