= Jeff Strasser =

Luxembourgish football player and manager

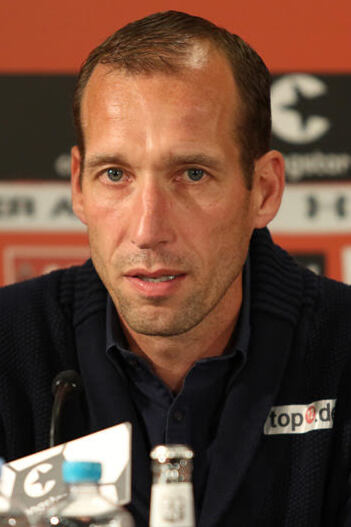
- Strasser in 2017

Personal information
- Date of birth: 5 October 1974 (age 52)
- Place of birth: Mondorf-les-Bains, Luxembourg
- Height: 1.90 m (6 ft 3 in)
- Position: Centre back

Team information
- Current team: Luxembourg (manager)

Youth career
- Mondorf-les-Bains
- 1992–1993: Union Luxembourg

Senior career*
Years	Team	Apps	(Gls)
1993–1999	Metz	67	(1)
1999–2002	1. FC Kaiserslautern	81	(7)
2002–2006	Borussia Mönchengladbach	113	(3)
2006–2007	Strasbourg	26	(1)
2007–2009	Metz	39	(0)
2009	Fola Esch	2	(1)
2009–2010	Grasshopper	9	(0)
2010	Fola Esch	1	(0)
Total		338	(13)

International career
1993–2010	Luxembourg	98	(7)

Managerial career
- 2010: Fola Esch (player-manager)
- 2010–2012: Fola Esch (assistant)
- 2012–2017: Fola Esch
- 2017–2018: 1. FC Kaiserslautern
- 2018–2020: Fola Esch
- 2020: Swift Hesperange
- 2021–2022: Jeunesse Esch
- 2022–2025: Progrès Niederkorn
- 2025–: Luxembourg
- * Club domestic league appearances and goals

Jeff Strasser (born 5 October 1974) is a Luxembourgish former professional football player and the current manager of the Luxembourg national team.

== Club career ==
Strasser has made a fairly successful career in French and German first divisions. After playing for French side FC Metz in Ligue 1 between 1993 and 1999, he moved to German Bundesliga side 1. FC Kaiserslautern and spent three seasons with the club before leaving it for Borussia Mönchengladbach in 2002. With the two German clubs, he spent seven seasons in Bundesliga and was a regular in each of the seven seasons, making a total of 194 appearances and scoring 10 goals in the league.

In August 2006, he moved to French Ligue 2 side RC Strasbourg. On 31 July 2007, he signed a two-year contract with FC Metz and was released after his contract ended on 30 June 2009, On 17 July 2009, he returned to Luxembourg on 17 July 2009, signing a two-year contract with CS Fola Esch. However, the move only lasted 17 days before Strasser moved to Grasshopper, signing a one-year contract on 15 August 2009.

== International career ==
Strasser made his debut for Luxembourg in an October 1993 World Cup qualification match against Greece. He scored seven goals over 98 appearances for Luxembourg. He played in 29 FIFA World Cup qualification matches. He took over from Carlo Weis as most-capped Luxembourg men's football player in November 2008, until Mario Mutsch earned his 99th cap in September 2018.

== Managerial career ==
On 17 May 2010, he was appointed as youth manager of CS Fola Esch. On 4 December 2010, he was promoted to the Fola Esch senior team, managing briefly in November 2010 along with Cyril Serredszum, who later took on the job alone. Strasser took the job permanently himself in 2012, taking Fola Esch to their first wins in the UEFA Europa League before leaving in 2017 to take over 1. FC Kaiserslautern.

On 24 January 2018, in a game against SV Darmstadt 98, Strasser was rushed to hospital after suffering a medical emergency at half-time. Reports in German media claimed that Strasser had suffered a heart attack and the game was immediately abandoned. A week later, it was announced that due to ongoing health problems, Strasser will no longer be active as manager for 1. FC Kaiserslautern.

On 16 August 2018, it was announced that Strasser had returned to manage Fola Esch.

On 19 August 2025, Strasser was announced as the successor of Luc Holtz as manager of the Luxembourg national team.

== Career statistics ==
=== International goals ===
#	Date	Venue	Opponent	Score	Result	Competition
1.	7 October 2000	Stade Josy Barthel, Luxembourg, Luxembourg	Slovenia	1–2	Loss	2002 FIFA World Cup qualification
2.	17 April 2002	Stade Alphonse Theis, Hesperange, Luxembourg	Liechtenstein	3–3	Draw	Friendly
3.	30 April 2003	Stadium Puskás Ferenc, Budapest, Hungary	Hungary	5–1	Loss	Friendly
4.	19 August 2003	Stade de la Frontière, Esch-sur-Alzette, Luxembourg	Malta	1–1	Draw	Friendly
5.	18 August 2004	Tehelné pole, Bratislava, Slovakia	Slovakia	3–1	Loss	2006 FIFA World Cup qualification
6.	10 September 2008	Letzigrund, Zürich, Switzerland	Switzerland	1–2	Win	2010 FIFA World Cup qualification
7.	3 March 2010	Stade Josy Barthel, Luxembourg, Luxembourg	Azerbaijan	1–2	Loss	Friendly

== Managerial statistics ==
As of match played 16 November 2026

Team	From	To	Record							
Team	From	To	G	W	D	L	GF	GA	GD	Win %
(Luxembourg) Fola Esch (player-manager)	2 November 2010	22 December 2010	3	2	0	1	6	3	+3	66.67%
(Luxembourg) Fola Esch	1 July 2012	26 September 2017	166	107	32	27	394	182	+212	64.46%
(Germany) 1. FC Kaiserslautern	27 September 2017	31 January 2018	11	2	4	5	12	16	-4	18.18%
(Luxembourg) Fola Esch	16 August 2018	30 June 2020	49	31	8	10	138	55	+83	63.27%
(Luxembourg) Swift Hesperange	1 July 2020	14 October 2020	7	3	2	2	12	9	+3	42.86%
(Luxembourg) Jeunesse Esch	1 July 2021	30 June 2022	31	15	5	11	46	30	+16	48.39%
(Luxembourg) Progrès Niederkorn	1 July 2022	4 March 2025	93	58	18	17	196	98	+98	62.37%
Luxembourg	19 August 2025	Present	16	4	0	12	9	25	-16	25%
Total			376	222	69	85	814	418	+396	59.04%
