= Pascal Pierre =

French footballer (born 1968)

Personal information
- Date of birth: 28 May 1968 (age 58)
- Place of birth: Caen, France
- Height: 1.78 m (5 ft 10 in)
- Position: Defender

Senior career*
Years	Team	Apps	(Gls)
1987–1992	Brest	119	(6)
1993–2002	Metz	296	(4)
Total		415	(10)
- * Club domestic league appearances and goals

Pascal Pierre (born 28 May 1968) is a French former professional footballer who played as a defender. While at Metz he played in the final as they won the 1995–96 Coupe de la Ligue.
