= André Biancarelli =

French footballer (born 1970)

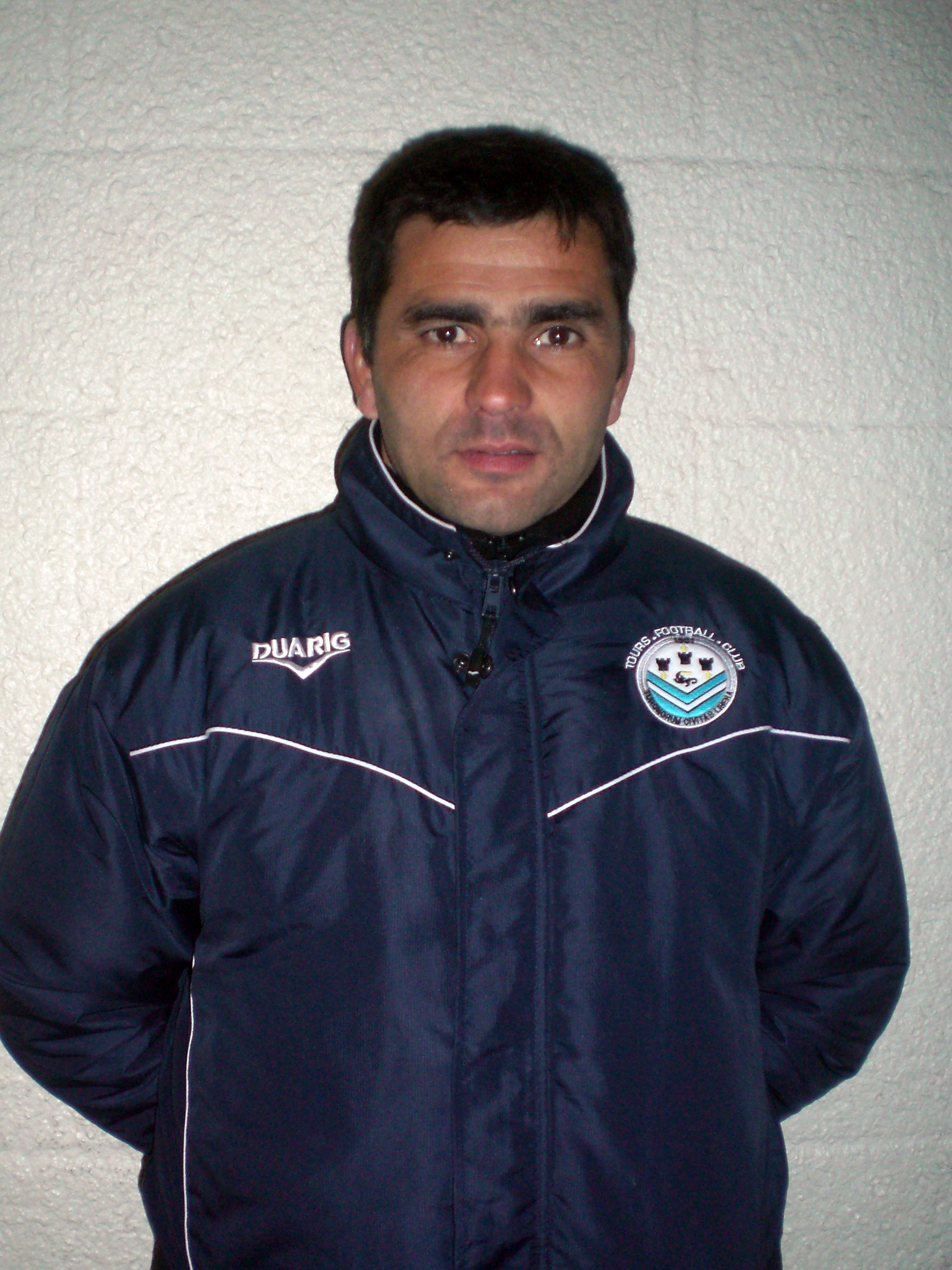
- Biancarelli with Tours in 2011

Personal information
- Date of birth: 12 March 1970 (age 56)
- Place of birth: Avignon, France
- Height: 1.77 m (5 ft 10 in)
- Position: Goalkeeper

Team information
- Current team: Saint-Étienne (goalkeeping coach)

Youth career
- 1976–1987: Porto Vecchio
- 1987–1991: Bastia

Senior career*
Years	Team	Apps	(Gls)
1991–1996	Bastia	35	(0)
1996–2000	Metz	10	(0)
2000–2006	Monaco	3	(0)
Total		48	(0)

International career
1992–1993	Corsica	2	(0)
- * Club domestic league appearances and goals

André Biancarelli (born 12 March 1970) is a French professional football coach and former player who played as a goalkeeper. As of 2022, he is a goalkeeping coach for Ligue 2 club Saint-Étienne.

From 2006 to 2009, Biancarelli was a goalkeeping coach for Monaco. He worked in this role for Tours from 2009 to 2015 and Toulouse from 2015 to 2018. In 2020, he was a goalkeeping coach for his former club Porto Vecchio before joining Saint-Étienne, also in the role of goalkeeping coach.

== Honours ==
Bastia

- Coupe de la Ligue runner-up: 1994–95

Metz

- UEFA Intertoto Cup runner-up: 1999

Monaco

- Trophée des Champions: 2000
