= Frédéric Meyrieu =

French footballer (born 1968)

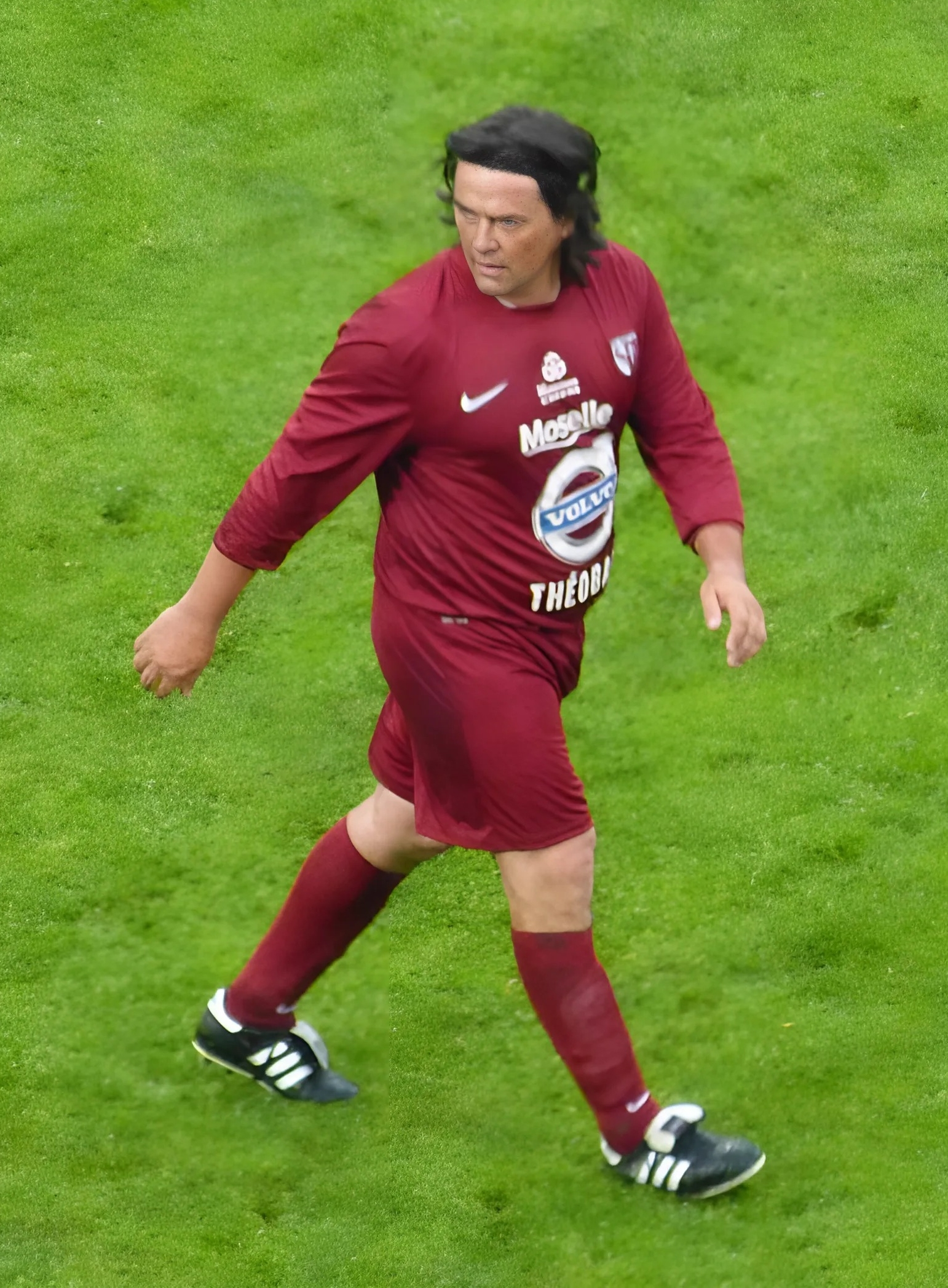
- Meyrieu in 2013

Personal information
- Date of birth: 9 February 1968 (age 58)
- Place of birth: La Seyne-sur-Mer, France
- Height: 1.70 m (5 ft 7 in)
- Position: Midfielder

Youth career
- Le Revest
- Toulon
- Marseille

Senior career*
Years	Team	Apps	(Gls)
1985–1989	Marseille	34	(2)
1987–1988	→ Le Havre (loan)	17	(0)
1989–1990	Bordeaux	7	(0)
1990–1993	Toulon	95	(13)
1993–1996	Lens	124	(19)
1997	Sion	14	(1)
1997–2002	Metz	145	(20)
Total		436	(55)
- * Club domestic league appearances and goals

Frédéric Meyrieu (born 9 February 1968) is a French former professional footballer who played as a midfielder.

== Honours ==
FC Sion

- Swiss Championship: 1996–97
- Swiss Cup: 1996–97
