= Danny Boffin =

Belgian football coach and former player

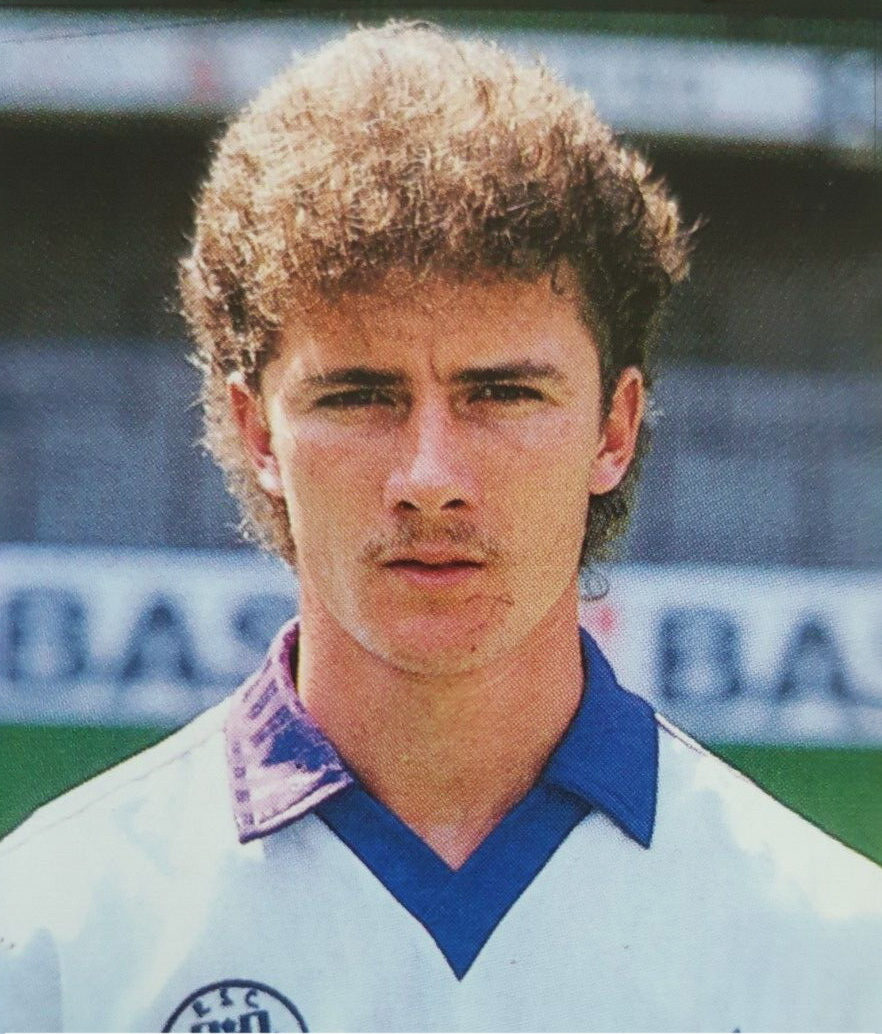
- Boffin in 1992.

Personal information
- Full name: Daniel Edouward Boffin
- Date of birth: 10 July 1965 (age 61)
- Place of birth: Sint-Truiden, Belgium
- Height: 1.72 m (5 ft 8 in)
- Position: Winger

Youth career
- Sint-Truiden

Senior career*
Years	Team	Apps	(Gls)
1985–1987	Sint-Truiden	60	(8)
1987–1991	FC Liège	128	(8)
1991–1997	Anderlecht	187	(30)
1997–2001	Metz	109	(14)
2001–2003	Sint-Truiden	101	(24)
2004	Standard Liège	4	(0)
Total		589	(84)

International career
1989	Belgium U21	2	(0)
1989–2002	Belgium	53	(1)

Managerial career
- 2011–2012: Sint-Truiden (forward coach)
- 2012–2013: Sint-Truiden (youth)
- XXXX–2015: Tienen (youth)
- 2017: Bolderberg
- 2017–2018: Patro Eisden Maasmechelen
- * Club domestic league appearances and goals

Daniel Edouward Boffin (born 10 July 1965) is a Belgian former professional footballer who played as a left winger and current football coach.

During his professional career, which spanned nearly two decades, he played for four clubs in his country – most notably Anderlecht – and one in France, appearing in nearly 600 official games as a professional.

Boffin represented Belgium in three World Cups, the last of which occurred when he was 37.

== Club career ==
Born in Sint-Truiden, Boffin began playing professionally for local Sint-Truidense VV, in the Belgian Second Division. After two solid years he moved to the Pro League with RFC Liège, appearing in European competition with the club and also being instrumental as it won its first-ever domestic cup, in 1990.

At the age of 26, after more than 150 official games for Liège, Boffin signed with national giants R.S.C. Anderlecht, continuing to be an undisputed starter in his career: in his first two seasons combined he scored 13 goals, helping lead the Brussels-based team to three leagues in a row as five managers were in charge of the team during his six-year spell. On 8 December 1993, he scored with his (weak) right foot to take a 3–0 lead at Werder Bremen in the UEFA Champions League group stage, but the German club made an unlikely recovery to take the match 5–3.

Boffin moved abroad aged 32 as he signed with FC Metz, where he was dubbed La mobylette due to his speed. In his debut campaign, which started on 2 August 1997 with a 1–0 win at Olympique Lyonnais, he helped to a best-ever finish in Ligue 1, a second place; in spite of his age, he continued to feature regularly for the French side.

In January 2001, Boffin returned to his first club, helping it always maintain its top flight status while the player posted the best scoring records of his career, with 11 and 12 goals in two separate seasons. He split his final year, 2003–04, with Sint-Truiden and Standard Liège, and eventually called it quits at 39 years of age, with totals of – in the Belgian top level alone – 415 matches and 67 goals (he still played some amateur football with VV Real Nieuwerkerken).

== International career ==
Boffin played 53 games for the Belgium national team, during 13 years. His debut came on 23 August 1989, in a 3–0 friendly win with Denmark.

In the following decade, Boffin would be an important offensive member for the Diables Rouges, being selected for the 1994, 1998 and 2002 FIFA World Cups, totalling five matches (only a squad member in the latter edition). Aged 35, he was overlooked for UEFA Euro 2000, played on home soil.

== Honours ==
FC Liège

- Belgian Cup: 1989–90

Anderlecht

- Belgian First Division: 1992–93, 1993–94, 1994–95
- Belgian Cup: 1993–94; runner-up 1996–97
- Belgian Supercup: 1991, 1993, 1994, 1995

Metz

- Coupe de la Ligue: runner-up 1998–99

'Sint-Truiden'

- Belgian Cup: runner-up 2002–03

Belgium

- FIFA Fair Play Trophy: 2002 World Cup

Individual

- Man of the Season (Belgian First Division): 2001–02, 2002–03
