= Geoffray Toyes =

French footballer (born 1973)

Geoffray Toyas
Personal information
- Date of birth: 18 May 1973 (age 53)
- Place of birth: Bordeaux, France
- Height: 1.76 m (5 ft 9 in)
- Position: Defender

Youth career
- Bordeaux

Senior career*
Years	Team	Apps	(Gls)
1994–1997	Bordeaux	62	(0)
1997–2003	Metz	155	(5)
2003–2004	Nancy	9	(0)
2004–2005	La Louvière	31	(1)
2005–2008	Mouscron	80	(2)
2008–2009	Brussels	22	(0)
Total		359	(8)

International career
1996	France U23	1	(0)
- * Club domestic league appearances and goals

Geoffray Toyes (born 18 May 1973) is a French former professional footballer who played as a defender.

He played for the France national Olympic team at the 1996 Summer Olympics.
