= Joël Müller =

French footballer and manager (born 1952)

Personal information
- Date of birth: 2 January 1952 (age 74)
- Place of birth: Donchery, France
- Position: Defender

Youth career
- 1966–1971: Metz

Senior career*
Years	Team	Apps	(Gls)
1971–1978	Metz	167	(6)
1978–1979	Nice	29	(0)
1979–1981	Lyon	56	(1)
1981–1984	Dunkerque		

Managerial career
- 1984–1989: Metz (youth academy)
- 1989–2000: Metz
- 2001–2005: Lens
- 2005–2006: Metz
- 2006–: Metz (technical director)
- 2010: Metz
- * Club domestic league appearances and goals

Joël Müller (born 2 January 1952) is a former professional football player and manager. He works as a technical director for FC Metz. While at Metz he led them to victory in the 1995–96 Coupe de la Ligue.
