= 1998–99 Coupe de la Ligue =

French League Cup

Tournament details
- Country: France
- Dates: 28 October 1998 – 8 May 1999
- Teams: 42

Final positions
- Champions: Lens (1st title)
- Runners-up: Metz

Tournament statistics
- Matches played: 40
- Goals scored: 84 (2.1 per match)
- Top goal scorer: Nenad Jestrović (4 goals)

The 1998–99 Coupe de la Ligue began on 28 October 1998 and the final took place on 8 May 1999 at the Stade de France. Paris Saint-Germain were the defending champions, but were knocked-out by Montpellier in the Quarter-finals. Lens went on to win the tournament, beating Metz 1–0 in the final.

== First round ==
The matches were played on 28 October and 1 November 1998.

Team 1	Score	Team 2
Wasquehal	0–1	Troyes
Saint-Étienne	2–2 (a.e.t.) (4–1 p)	Gueugnon
Le Mans	1–2	Red Star
Caen	0–0 (a.e.t.) (6–5 p)	Sedan
Louhans-Cuiseaux	1–0	Lille
Nîmes	0–2	Niort
Amiens	2–1 (a.e.t.)	Mulhouse
Martigues	2–2 (a.e.t.) (6–7 p)	Cannes
Guingamp	4–1	Ajaccio

== Second round ==
The matches were played on 9 and 10 January 1999.

Team 1	Score	Team 2
Paris Saint-Germain	1–0	Saint-Étienne
Niort	0–1	Auxerre
Guingamp	0–1	Amiens
Lyon	0–2	Montpellier
Marseille	1–1 (a.e.t.) (5–6 p)	Lens
Laval	0–1	Rennes
Lorient	1–2	Châteauroux
Cannes	0–1	Louhans-Cuiseaux
Valence	0–0 (a.e.t.) (2–4 p)	Toulouse
Le Havre	1–0	Bordeaux
Monaco	1–0	Caen
Sochaux	1–0 (a.e.t.)	Bastia
Metz	1–0	Nantes
Nancy	1–0	Beauvais
Red Star	1–1 (a.e.t.) (2–4 p)	Nice
Strasbourg	1–4 (a.e.t.)	Troyes

== Round of 16 ==
The matches were played on 1, 2 and 3 February 1999.

Team 1	Score	Team 2
Monaco	0–0 (a.e.t.) (2–3 p)	Paris Saint-Germain
Sochaux	2–1	Nancy
Metz	2–0	Louhans-Cuiseaux
Le Havre	0–2	Lens
Rennes	4–0	Troyes
Châteauroux	0–1	Montpellier
Amiens	1–2	Auxerre
Nice	0–2	Toulouse

== Quarter-finals ==
The matches were played on 5, 6 and 7 March 1999.

Team 1	Score	Team 2
Auxerre	0–1	Sochaux
Paris Saint-Germain	0–2	Montpellier
Metz	3–3 (a.e.t.) (3–2 p)	Toulouse
Rennes	0–1	Lens

== Semi-finals ==
The matches were played on 17 and 18 April 1999.

Team 1	Score	Team 2
Lens	2–0 (a.e.t.)	Sochaux
Metz	4–3	Montpellier

== Final ==
The final was played on 8 May 1999 at the Stade de France.

8 May 1999
20:40

Lens	1–0	Metz
Moreira 56'

Stade de France, Saint-Denis
Attendance: 78,180
Referee: Claude Colombo
