= 1997–98 RC Lens season =

Lens
1997–98 season
- President: Gervais Martel
- Manager: Daniel Leclercq
- Stadium: Stade Félix-Bollaert
- Division 1: 1st
- Coupe de France: Final
- Coupe de la Ligue: Semi-finals
- Top goalscorer: League: Anto Drobnjak (14); All: Anto Drobnjak (15)
- Average home league attendance: 27,788
Home colours	Away colours	Third colours

The 1997–98 season of the Racing Club de Lens was the 45th season of the club from Pas-de-Calais with first division championship league of France, the seventh consecutive in the elite of French football. This season was remarkable in the history of the club, because it was the first and only title that RC Lens won in French first division. The club also reached, for the third time in its history, the final of Coupe de France.

Daniel Leclercq lead the club in this season, which took place just before the World Cup hosted by France, and for which the Bollaert stadium hosted several games. Leclercq took control of the team early in the season after the previous season's deputy Roger Lemerre. This happened in 1997 to prevent a possible relegation to the second division. Leclercq set up a tactic based on offense and speed. The team relied on players present for several years, such as Jean-Guy Wallemme, a captain of the team, or the goalkeeper Guillaume Warmuz. Anto Drobnjak and Stéphane Ziani also played a central role in the team.

Sixth in the mid-season, RC Lens took the championship lead after its victory in their 30th game of the season against league-leader FC Metz. Following that victory, RC Lens remained in first place through to the end of the season. Following this winning streak in the league, RC Lens lost in the final of Coupe de France and in the semifinals of the League Cup against the Paris Saint-Germain.

== Players ==
=== First-team squad ===
Squad at end of season

Note: Flags indicate national team as defined under FIFA eligibility rules; some limited exceptions apply. Players may hold more than one non-FIFA nationality.

No.	Pos.	Nation	Player
1	GK	FRA	Guillaume Warmuz
2	DF	FRA	Éric Sikora
3	DF	FRA	Yoann Lachor
4	DF	FRA	Cyrille Magnier
6	MF	MAD	Hervé Arsène
7	MF	FRA	Mickaël Debève
8	DF	FRA	Jean-Guy Wallemme (captain)
9	FW	YUG	Anto Drobnjak
10	MF	FRA	Stéphane Ziani
11	FW	FRA	Tony Vairelles
12	FW	HAI	Wagneau Eloi

No.	Pos.	Nation	Player
13	MF	FRA	Frédéric Déhu
14	MF	NGA	Wilson Oruma
16	GK	FRA	Cédric Berthelin
17	MF	CMR	Marc-Vivien Foé
18	FW	FRA	Philippe Brunel
19	FW	CZE	Vladimír Šmicer
22	DF	FRA	Xavier Méride
24	DF	FRA	José-Karl Pierre-Fanfan
25	MF	FRA	Romain Pitau
26	DF	FRA	Aboubacar Sankharé
30	GK	FRA	Christophe Marichez

== Transfers ==
=== In ===
Player	Transferred from	Fee
Jose-Karl Pierre-Fanfan	USL Dunkerque	Free
Stephane Ziani	Bordeaux	?
Anto Drobnjak	SC Bastia	?
Romain Pitau	B Team	Free
Xavier Meride	B Team	Free
Wilson Oruma	AS Nancy	End of loan
Wagneau Eloi	AS Nancy	End of loan

== Competitions ==
=== French Division 1 ===
==== League table ====
Pos	Team	Pld	W	D	L	GF	GA	GD	Pts	Qualification or relegation
1	Lens (C)	34	21	5	8	55	30	+25	68	Qualification to Champions League group stage
2	Metz	34	20	8	6	48	28	+20	68	Qualification to Champions League second qualifying round
3	Monaco	34	18	5	11	51	33	+18	59	Qualification to UEFA Cup first round
4	Marseille	34	16	9	9	47	27	+20	57	Qualification to UEFA Cup first round
5	Bordeaux	34	15	11	8	49	41	+8	56	Qualification to UEFA Cup first round

Source: Ligue 1
Rules for classification: 1) points; 2) goal difference; 3) number of goals scored.
(C) Champions

==== Results summary ====
Overall								Home						Away					
Pld	W	D	L	GF	GA	GD	Pts	W	D	L	GF	GA	GD	W	D	L	GF	GA	GD
34	21	5	8	55	30	+25	68	12	4	1	32	9	+23	9	1	7	23	21	+2

Last updated: 9 May 1998.
Source: Ligue 1

==== Results by round ====
Round	1	2	3	4	5	6	7	8	9	10	11	12	13	14	15	16	17	18	19	20	21	22	23	24	25	26	27	28	29	30	31	32	33	34
Ground	H	A	H	A	H	H	A	H	A	H	A	H	H	A	H	A	H	A	H	A	A	H	A	H	A	H	A	H	A	A	H	A	H	A
Result	W	L	D	W	D	D	L	W	W	W	L	W	L	D	W	W	L	W	W	L	W	L	W	W	W	L	W	W	W	W	W	W	W	D
Position	1	8	9	4	5	7	10	8	5	5	7	5	6	7	6	6	6	5	5	5	5	5	5	5	4	4	4	2	2	1	1	1	1	1

Source: Ligue 1
A = Away; H = Home; W = Win; D = Draw; L = Loss

=== Coupe de France ===
17 January 1998 Round of 64	Lens	2–1	Le Havre	Lens
17:10 CET (UTC+1)	Vairelles 60'; Déhu 90'		Pouget 36'	Stadium: Stade Félix-Bollaert; Attendance: 6,000; Referee: Franck Glochon

7 February 1998 Round of 32	Épinal	0–2 (a.e.t.)	Lens	Épinal
19:30 CET (UTC+1)			Magnier 107'; Vairelles 119'	Stadium: Stade de la Colombière; Attendance: 1,196; Referee: Bruno Derrien

28 February 1998 Round of 16	UFC Argentan	1–3	Lens	Caen
20:30 CET (UTC+1)	Sauvage 70'		Eloi 20', 77'; Déhu 90'	Stadium: Stade Michel d'Ornano; Attendance: 18,927; Referee: Laurent Duhamel

21 March 1998 Quarter-finals	Caen	1–2	Lens	Caen
17:00 CET (UTC+1)	Guerreiro 12'		Šmicer 57', 68'	Stadium: Stade Michel d'Ornano; Attendance: 20,648; Referee: Philippe Kalt

11 April 1998 Semi-finals	Lens	2–0	Lyon	Lens
17:00 CEST (UTC+2)	Ziani 24', 90'			Stadium: Stade Félix-Bollaert; Attendance: 38,269; Referee: Marc Batta

2 May 1998 Final	Paris Saint-Germain	2–1	Lens	Saint-Denis
20:45 CEST (UTC+2)	Raí 24'; Domi (yellow card) 30'; Ducrocq (yellow card) 48'; Simone 53'		Déhu (yellow card) 56'; Šmicer 83'	Stadium: Stade de France; Attendance: 78,265; Referee: Gilles Veissière

=== Coupe de la Ligue ===
5 January 1998 Round of 32	Lens	1–0	Stade Rennais	Lens
19:30 CET (UTC+1)	Šmicer (yellow card) 21'; Vairelles 77'		Silvestre (yellow card) 60'; Rossi (yellow card) 60'	Stadium: Stade Félix-Bollaert; Attendance: 8,000; Referee: Dominique Fraise

31 January 1998 Round of 16	Lens	1–0 (a.e.t.)	Chamois Niortais	Lens
19:30 CET (UTC+1)	Drobnjak 118'			Stadium: Stade Félix-Bollaert; Attendance: 21,956; Referee: Gilles Veissière

18 February 1998 Quarter-finals	Sochaux	1–4	Lens	Montbéliard
16:00 CET (UTC+1)	Bouger 39' (yellow card) 39'		Déhu (yellow card) 42' (goal) 63'; Brunel 73', 88'; Petereyns 76' (o.g.)	Stadium: Stade Auguste Bonal; Attendance: 6,000; Referee: Marc Batta

12 March 1998 Semi-finals	Paris Saint-Germain	2–1	Lens	Paris
20:45 CET (UTC+1)	Gava (yellow card) 44'; Maurice (yellow card) 46'; Simone 52', 56'		Magnier (yellow card) 44'; Ziani 37' (yellow card) 57'	Stadium: Parc des Princes; Attendance: 28,692; Referee: Bernard Saules
