= 1998 Coupe de France final =

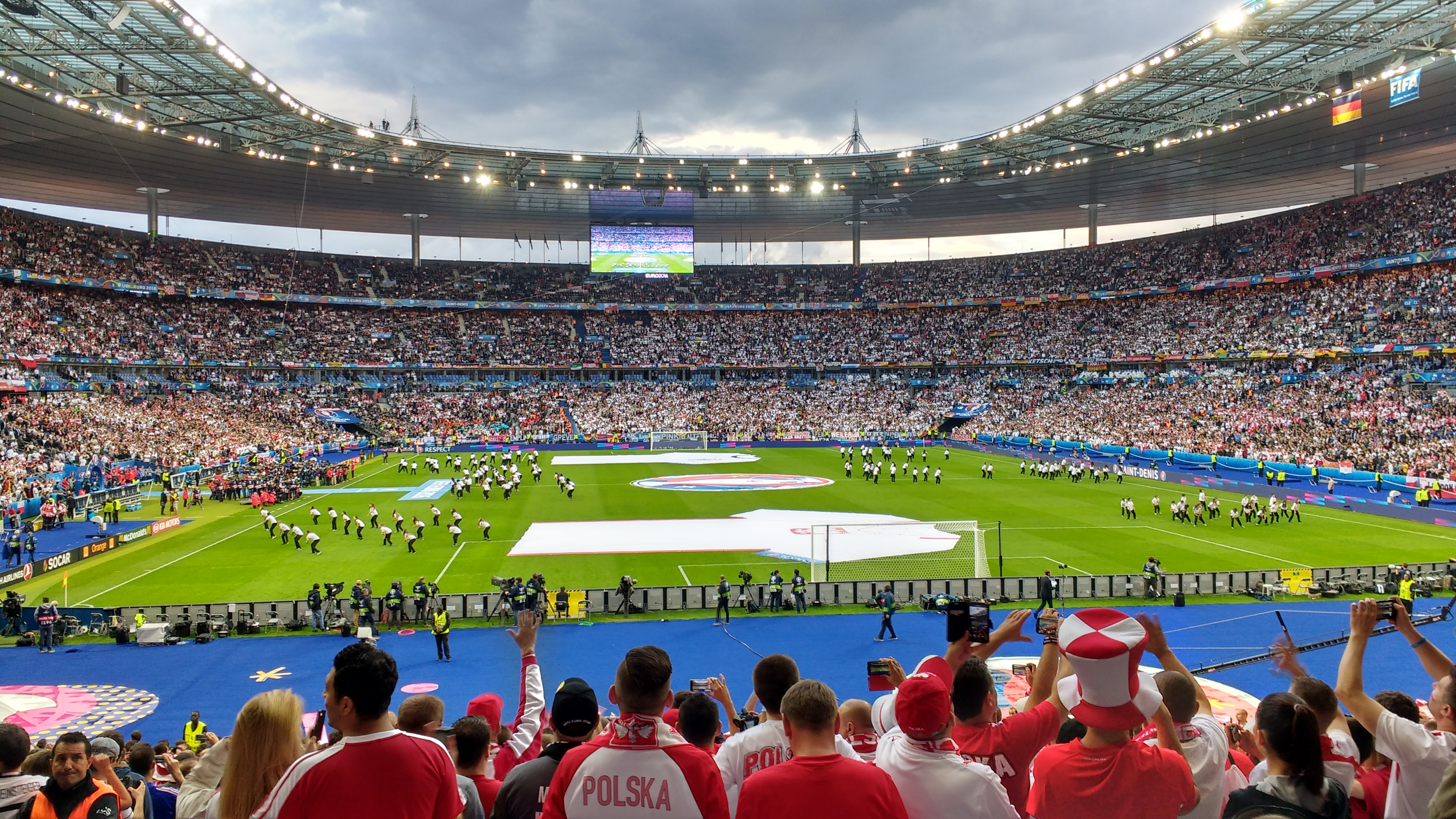
- Event: 1997–98 Coupe de France
Paris Saint-Germain	Lens
2	1
- Date: 2 May 1998
- Venue: Stade de France, Saint-Denis
- Referee: Gilles Veissière
- Attendance: 78,265

The 1998 Coupe de France final was a football match held at Stade de France, Saint-Denis on 2 May 1998, that saw Paris SG defeat RC Lens 2-1 thanks to goals by Raí and Marco Simone. Vladimír Šmicer scored for the Division 1 champion which could not enjoy two successes in a single season. This final was also the first ever played in the newly-built Stade de France.

== Road to the final ==
Paris Saint-Germain			Round	Lens
Opponent	H/A	Result	1997–98 Coupe de France	Opponent	H/A	Result
Thouars	A	3–1	Round of 64	Le Havre	H	2–1
Lorient	A	1–1	Round of 32	Épinal	A	2–0 (a.e.t.)
Pau	A	1–0 (a.e.t.)	Round of 16	Argentan	A	3–1
Monaco	H	1–0	Quarter-finals	Caen	A	2–1
Guingamp	H	1–0	Semi-finals	Lyon	H	2–0

== Match details ==
2 May 1998
20:00

Paris Saint-Germain	2–1	Lens
Raí 25'; Simone 53'		Šmicer 83'

Stade de France, Saint-Denis
Attendance: 78,265
Referee: Gilles Veissière

PARIS SG:
GK	1	(France) Vincent Fernandez
DF	5	(France) Alain Roche
DF	4	(France) Paul Le Guen
DF	6	(France) Eric Rabesandratana
DF	3	(France) Didier Domi
MF	2	(France) Jimmy Algerino
MF	10	(Brazil) Raí (c)
MF	7	(France) Pierre Ducrocq
MF	8	(France) Franck Gava
FW	9	(Italy) Marco Simone
FW	11	(France) Florian Maurice	(substituted off) 88'
Substitutes:
MF	15	(France) Laurent Fournier	(substituted on) 88'
Manager:
(Brazil) Ricardo Gomes Assistant Referees: Fourth Official:

RC LENS:
GK	1	(France) Guillaume Warmuz
DF	2	(France) Eric Sikora
DF	6	(France) Jean-Guy Wallemme (c)
DF	4	(France) Frédéric Déhu
DF	3	(France) Cyrille Magnier
MF	8	(France) Stéphane Ziani
MF	7	(Cameroon) Marc-Vivien Foé
MF	5	(France) Mickaël Debève	(substituted off) 68'
FW	10	(Czech Republic) Vladimír Šmicer
FW	9	(Federal Republic of Yugoslavia) Anto Drobnjak	(substituted off) 60'
FW	11	(France) Tony Vairelles
Substitutes:
FW	13	(Haiti) Wagneau Eloi	(substituted on) 60'
MF	14	(France) Philippe Brunel	(substituted on) 68'
Manager:
(France) Daniel Leclercq

== See also ==
- 1997–98 Coupe de France
