= 1997–98 Le Havre AC season =

Le Havre AC
1997–98 season
- Head coach: Denis Troch
- Stadium: Stade Jules Deschaseaux
- French Division 1: 10th
- Coupe de France: Round of 64
- Coupe de la Ligue: Round of 16
- Top goalscorer: League: Cyrille Pouget (7); All: Cyrille Pouget (9)
- Average home league attendance: 11,347
- Biggest win: Le Havre 5–0 Châteauroux

The 1997–98 Le Havre AC season was the club's 126th season in existence and the seventh consecutive season in the top flight of French football. In addition to the domestic league, Le Havre participated in this season's edition of the Coupe de France and the Coupe de la Ligue. The season covers the period from 1 July 1997 to 30 June 1998.

== Overview ==
The team had a very bad start after achieving two wins in 19 matches, but it finished the season in the tenth place.

== Transfers ==
=== In ===
No.	Pos	Player	Transferred from	Fee	Date	Source
15			TBD		1 July 2020	

=== Out ===
No.	Pos	Player	Transferred to	Fee	Date	Source
15			TBD		1 July 2020	

== Pre-season and friendlies ==
Win Draw Loss

== Competitions ==
=== Overview ===
Competition	First match	Last match	Starting round	Final position	Record							
Competition	First match	Last match	Starting round	Final position	Pld	W	D	L	GF	GA	GD	Win %
French Division 1	2 August 1997	9 May 1998	Matchday 1	10th	34	10	14	10	38	35	+3	29.41
Coupe de France	17 January 1998		Round of 64	Round of 64	1	0	0	1	1	2	−1	0.00
Coupe de la Ligue	5 January 1998	1 February 1998	Round of 32	Round of 16	2	1	0	1	6	5	+1	50.00
Total					37	11	14	12	45	42	+3	29.73

Source: Competitions

=== French Division 1 ===
==== League table ====
Pos	Team	Pld	W	D	L	GF	GA	GD	Pts	Qualification or relegation
8	Paris Saint-Germain	34	14	8	12	43	35	+8	50	Qualification to Cup Winners' Cup first round (Note: Paris Saint-Germain qualified for the 1998–99 UEFA Cup Winners' Cup as winners of the 1997–98 Coupe de France and 1997–98 Coupe de la Ligue.)
9	Bastia	34	13	11	10	36	31	+5	50	Qualification to Intertoto Cup second round
10	Le Havre	34	10	14	10	38	35	+3	44	
11	Nantes	34	11	8	15	35	41	−6	41	
12	Montpellier	34	10	11	13	32	42	−10	41	

Source: Ligue 1
Rules for classification: 1) points; 2) goal difference; 3) number of goals scored.

==== Results summary ====
Overall								Home						Away					
Pld	W	D	L	GF	GA	GD	Pts	W	D	L	GF	GA	GD	W	D	L	GF	GA	GD
34	10	14	10	38	35	+3	44	6	9	2	25	14	+11	4	5	8	13	21	−8

==== Results by round ====
Round	1	2	3	4	5	6	7	8	9	10	11	12	13	14	15	16	17	18	19	20	21	22	23	24	25	26	27	28	29	30	31	32	33	34
Ground	A	H	A	H	A	H	A	H	A	H	A	H	A	H	A	H	H	A	H	A	H	A	H	A	H	A	H	A	H	A	H	A	A	H
Result	L	W	D	L	L	D	L	D	L	D	L	D	D	W	D	D	D	D	L	W	W	L	D	W	W	L	W	D	W	L	D	W	W	D
Position	15	7	7	13	15	15	15	15	18	17	17	17	17	16	16	16	17	16	17	14	14	15	14	13	12	12	12	12	11	12	12	10	10	10

A = Away; H = Home; W = Win; D = Draw; L = Loss

==== Matches ====
2 August 1997 1	Marseille	3–1	Le Havre	Marseille
CEST (UTC+2)				Stadium: Stade Vélodrome

8 August 1997 2	Le Havre	4–0	Montpellier	Le Havre
CEST (UTC+2)				Stadium: Stade Jules Deschaseaux

15 August 1997 3	Lens	0–0	Le Havre	Lens
CEST (UTC+2)				Stadium: Stade Félix-Bollaert

22 August 1997 4	Le Havre	1–3	Lyon	Le Havre
CEST (UTC+2)				Stadium: Stade Jules Deschaseaux

30 August 1997 5	Nantes	2–0	Le Havre	Nantes
CEST (UTC+2)				Stadium: Stade de la Beaujoire

4 September 1997 6	Le Havre	1–1	Toulouse	Le Havre
CEST (UTC+2)				Stadium: Stade Jules Deschaseaux

12 September 1997 7	Bordeaux	2–1	Le Havre	Bordeaux
CEST (UTC+2)				Stadium: Parc Lescure

20 September 1997 8	Le Havre	1–1	Paris Saint-Germain	Le Havre
CEST (UTC+2)				Stadium: Stade Jules Deschaseaux

26 September 1997 9	Châteauroux	2–1	Le Havre	Châteauroux
CEST (UTC+2)				Stadium: Stade Gaston Petit

4 October 1997 10	Le Havre	1–1	Monaco	Le Havre
CEST (UTC+2)				Stadium: Stade Jules Deschaseaux

8 October 1997 11	Metz	2–0	Le Havre	Metz
CEST (UTC+2)				Stadium: Stade Saint-Symphorien

17 October 1997 12	Le Havre	1–1	Rennes	Le Havre
CEST (UTC+2)				Stadium: Stade Jules Deschaseaux

25 October 1997 13	Cannes	1–1	Le Havre	Cannes
CEST (UTC+2)				Stadium: Stade Pierre-de-Coubertin

31 October 1997 14	Le Havre	2–1	Bastia	Le Havre
CET (UTC+1)				Stadium: Stade Jules Deschaseaux

8 November 1997 15	Auxerre	0–0	Le Havre	Auxerre
CET (UTC+1)				Stadium: Stade de l'Abbé-Deschamps

16 November 1997 16	Le Havre	1–1	Strasbourg	Le Havre
CET (UTC+1)				Stadium: Stade Jules Deschaseaux

21 November 1997 17	Le Havre	0–0	Guingamp	Le Havre
CET (UTC+1)				Stadium: Stade Jules Deschaseaux

29 November 1997 18	Montpellier	1–1	Le Havre	Montpellier
CET (UTC+1)				Stadium: Stade de la Mosson

5 December 1997 19	Le Havre	0–1	Lens	Le Havre
CET (UTC+1)				Stadium: Stade Jules Deschaseaux

13 December 1997 20	Lyon	0–1	Le Havre	Lyon
CET (UTC+1)				Stadium: Stade de Gerland

18 December 1997 21	Le Havre	1–0	Nantes	Le Havre
CET (UTC+1)				Stadium: Stade Jules Deschaseaux

10 January 1998 22	Toulouse	1–0	Le Havre	Toulouse
CET (UTC+1)				Stadium: Stadium Municipal

21 January 1998 23	Le Havre	0–0	Bordeaux	Le Havre
CET (UTC+1)				Stadium: Stade Jules Deschaseaux

24 January 1998 24	Paris Saint-Germain	0–2	Le Havre	Paris
CET (UTC+1)				Stadium: Parc des Princes

4 February 1998 25	Le Havre	5–0	Châteauroux	Le Havre
CET (UTC+1)				Stadium: Stade Jules Deschaseaux

13 February 1998 26	Monaco	2–0	Le Havre	Monaco
CET (UTC+1)				Stadium: Stade Louis II

21 February 1998 27	Le Havre	2–1	Metz	Le Havre
CET (UTC+1)				Stadium: Stade Jules Deschaseaux

7 March 1998 28	Rennes	2–2	Le Havre	Rennes
CET (UTC+1)				Stadium: Stade de la Route de Lorient

13 March 1998 29	Le Havre	2–0	Cannes	Le Havre
CET (UTC+1)				Stadium: Stade Jules Deschaseaux

28 March 1998 30	Bastia	2–0	Le Havre	Furiani
CET (UTC+1)				Stadium: Stade Armand Cesari

7 April 1998 31	Le Havre	2–2	Auxerre	Le Havre
CEST (UTC+2)				Stadium: Stade Jules Deschaseaux

18 April 1998 32	Strasbourg	0–1	Le Havre	Strasbourg
CEST (UTC+2)				Stadium: Stade de la Meinau

25 April 1998 33	Guingamp	1–2	Le Havre	Guingamp
CEST (UTC+2)				Stadium: Stade de Roudourou

9 May 1998 34	Le Havre	1–1	Marseille	Le Havre
CEST (UTC+2)				Stadium: Stade Jules Deschaseaux

=== Coupe de France ===
17 January 1998 Round of 64	Lens	2–1	Le Havre	Lens
17:10 CET (UTC+1)				Stadium: Stade Félix-Bollaert; Attendance: 6,000; Referee: Franck Glochon

=== Coupe de la Ligue ===
5 January 1998 Round of 32	Le Havre	5–3 (a.e.t.)	Lorient	Le Havre
19:30 CET (UTC+1)				Stadium: Stade Jules Deschaseaux; Attendance: 10,954; Referee: Jean-Claude Puyalt

1 February 1998 Round of 16	Stade Poitevin FC	2–1	Le Havre	Poitiers
14:30 CET (UTC+1)	Vairelles 60'; Déhu 90'		Pouget 36'	Stadium: Stade de la Pépinière; Attendance: 5,000; Referee: Claude Colombo
