= Xavier Méride =

French footballer (born 1975)

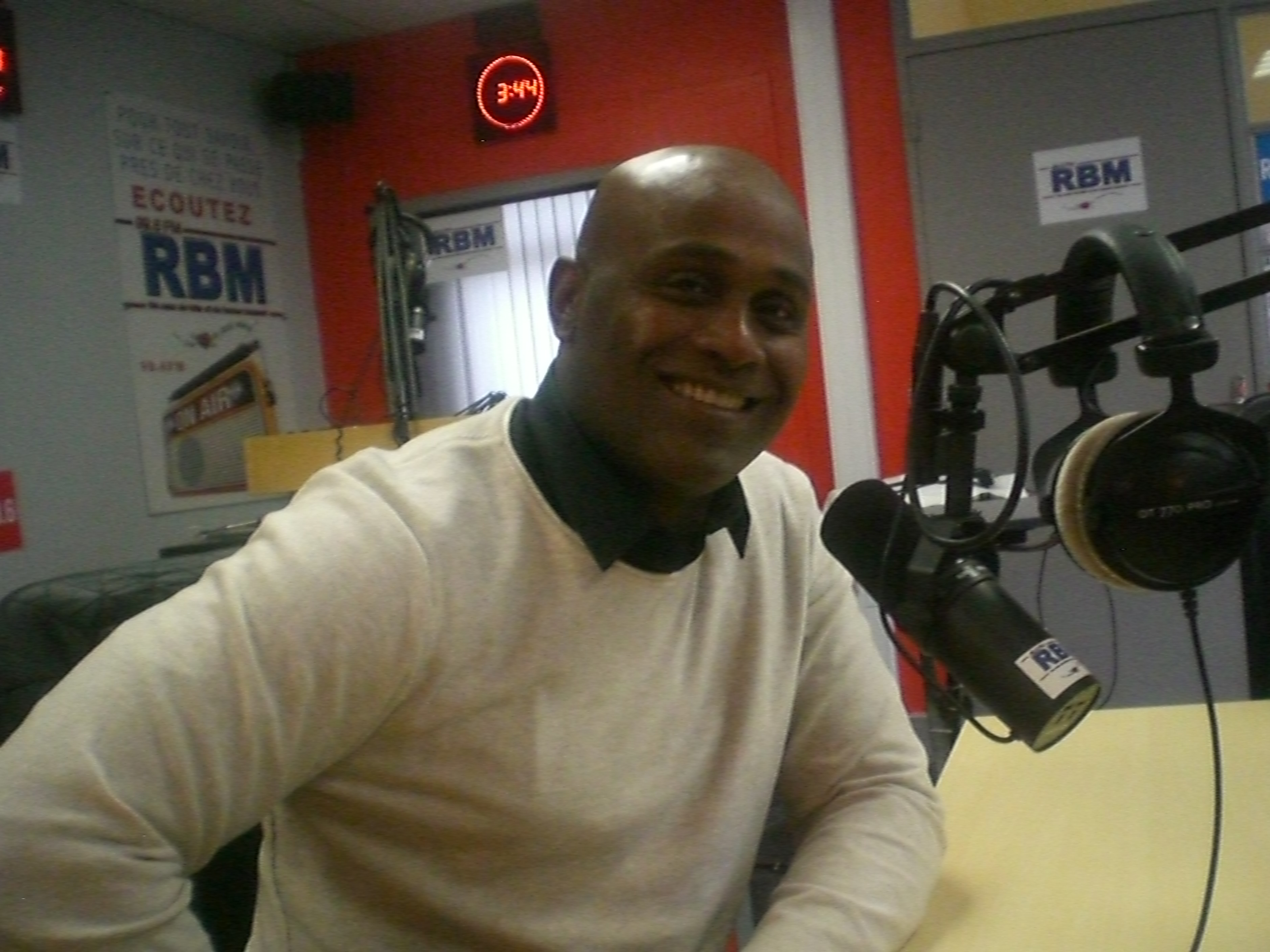
- Méride in 2015

Personal information
- Date of birth: 9 January 1975 (age 51)
- Place of birth: Paris, France
- Height: 1.87 m (6 ft 2 in)
- Position: Defender

Senior career*
Years	Team	Apps	(Gls)
1995–1999	Lens	25	(0)
1999	→ Toulouse FC (loan)	10	(0)
1999–2000	Lens	0	(0)
2000–2001	→ US Créteil (loan)	16	(0)
2001–2002	Lens	0	(0)
2003–2004	Dinamo Bucharest	15	(0)
2004	SO Romorantin	4	(0)
2004–2005	ES Wasquehal	33	(1)
2005–2007	Sud Nivernais Imphy Decize		
- * Club domestic league appearances and goals

Xavier Méride (French pronunciation: [ɡzavje meʁid]; born 9 January 1975) is a French former professional footballer who played as a defender. Whilst at Lens Méride, he contributed seven appearances as his side won 1997–98 French Division 1.

== Honours ==
Lens

- Ligue 1: 1998
- Coupe de la Ligue: 1999

Dinamo Bucharest

- Liga I: 2004
