= Anto Drobnjak =

Montenegrin footballer (born 1968)

Personal information
- Date of birth: 21 September 1968 (age 58)
- Place of birth: Bijelo Polje, SR Montenegro, SFR Yugoslavia
- Height: 1.86 m (6 ft 1 in)
- Position: Forward

Youth career
- Jedinstvo Bijelo Polje

Senior career*
Years	Team	Apps	(Gls)
1987–1992	Budućnost	104	(33)
1992–1994	Red Star Belgrade	64	(39)
1994–1997	Bastia	100	(50)
1997–1998	Lens	32	(14)
1998–1999	Gamba Osaka	31	(12)
1999–2001	Sochaux	33	(4)
2001–2002	Martigues	26	(9)
Total		390	(161)

International career
1996–1998	FR Yugoslavia	7	(4)

Managerial career
- 2011–2015: Montenegro (assistant)
- 2021–2022: Kom
- * Club domestic league appearances and goals

Anto Drobnjak (Cyrillic: Анто Дробњак; born 21 September 1968) is a Montenegrin former professional footballer who played as a forward. He was one of two top scorers of the First League of Yugoslavia in 1993 when he played for Red Star Belgrade. Internationally, he played for FR Yugoslavia national team in the qualification for the 1998 FIFA World Cup, although he was not selected to the country's squad for the final tournament.

== Club career ==
=== Budućnost ===
Drobnjak joined Budućnost ahead of the 1987–88 season. He made his professional debut under coach Stanko "Špaco" Poklepović, during a time when Budućnost fielded their most accomplished generation at the time; Drobnjak's teammates at Budućnost included Dragoje Leković, Branko Brnović, Željko Petrović, Predrag Mijatović, and Dejan Savićević. Drobnjak later attributed his early development to "Špaco" Poklepović:

"I was a kid back then and in one workout, shooting [the ball], I hit him in the head, but he didn't get upset. In fact, he loved me dearly. He had that Split accent and he often mentioned Our Beautiful Lady. Well, Špaco is a legend of Hajduk and an unforgettable man."

=== Red Star Belgrade ===
Drobnjak joined Red Star Belgrade ahead of the 1992–93 season, after which he was the league's top scorer along with Vojvodina's Vesko Mihajlović. On 15 May 1993, he scored the winning goal in the final of the 1993 Yugoslav Cup, in which Red Star beat Partizan 1–0. He was Red Star's top scorer in the 1993–94 season along with teammate Ilija Ivić, and was fifth highest goal scorer in the league that season.

=== Bastia ===
Amidst international sanctions against Yugoslavia, Drobnjak asked Red Star's sports director Dragan Džajić if there was any opportunity could leave both the club and country. Džajić got word of Bastia's search for a classic center forward, and after negotiations through Džajić, Drobnjak signed a three-year contract with Bastia in 1994. Under coach Frédéric Antonetti, he spent the following three seasons at the club, scoring 50 goals in 100 league games. On 3 May 1995, Drobnjak scored a goal in the 1995 Coupe de la Ligue final against Paris Saint-Germain, although it was denied by the referee. He signed a new three-year contract with Bastia in 1996. At the end of the 1996–97 season, Drobnjak was the sixth highest goal scorer in the league and Bastia finished in seventh overall. As a result, he received offers from Olympique de Marseille and Lens, but he ultimately chose Lens due to Bastia's bitter rivalry with Marseille.

=== Lens ===
In 1997, Drobnjak switched to fellow French club Lens, helping them win the league in his debut season under coach Daniel Leclercq. On 22 August 1997, Leclercq gave Drobnjak the green light to start against Olympique de Marseille in spite of a lingering back injury; Drobnjak went on to score a hat-trick in a 2–3 away win for Lens. On 15 November 1997, he scored a hat-trick in a 5–4 win against AS Cannes. He was the fourth highest goal scorer in the league that season.

=== Later career ===
He subsequently moved to Japan and played for Gamba Osaka. After a year, Drobnjak returned to France and joined Sochaux. He also spent one season at Martigues, before retiring in 2002.

== International career ==
Between 1996 and 1998, Drobnjak earned seven caps and scored three times for FR Yugoslavia. He made his debut on 6 October 1996 in a 8–1 away win against the Faroe Islands under coach Slobodan Santrač during the 1998 FIFA World Cup qualification. On 24 February 1998, Drobnjak scored a goal in a 3–1 friendly loss against Argentina at Estadio José María Minella. However, he was not selected to Yugoslavia's final squad for the 1998 FIFA World Cup. Multiple newspapers at the time expressed surprise at Drobnjak's absence in Yugoslavia's squad at the 1998 World Cup. His final international was an April 1998 friendly match against South Korea.

== Post-playing career ==
Drobnjak served as assistant manager to Branko Brnović at Montenegro from 2011 to 2015.

== Career statistics ==
Appearances and goals by national team and year
National team	Year	Apps	Goals
FR Yugoslavia	1996	1	0
FR Yugoslavia	1997	3	3
FR Yugoslavia	1998	3	1
Total		7	4

== International goals ==
No.	Date	Venue	Opponent	Score	Result	Competition
1.	9 January 1997	So Kon Po, Hong Kong	Russia	1–0	1–1 (5–6 p)	1997 Lunar New Year Cup
2.	25 February 1998	Mar del Plata, Argentina	Argentina	1–2	1–3	Friendly

== Honours ==
Red Star Belgrade

- FR Yugoslavia Cup: 1992–93

Lens

- Division 1: 1997–98

Individual

- First League of FR Yugoslavia top scorer: 1992–93
