= Didier Sénac =

French footballer and coach (born 1958)

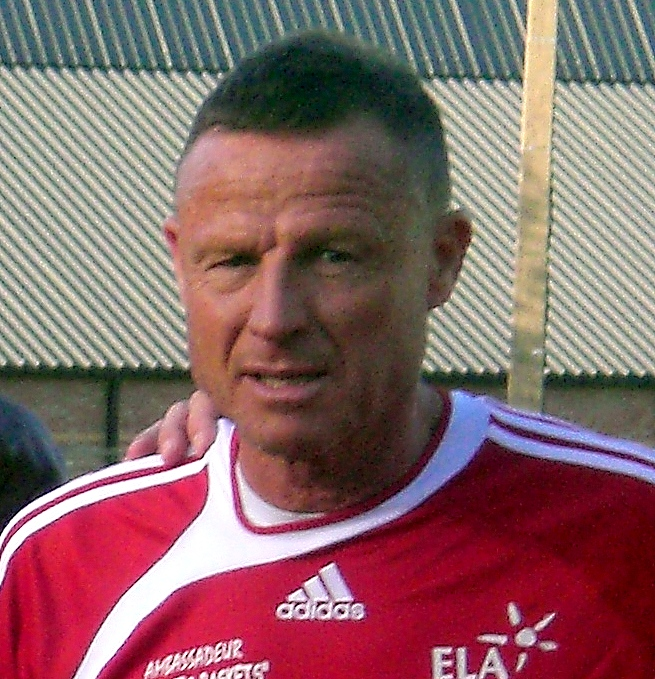

Personal information
- Date of birth: 2 October 1958 (age 68)
- Place of birth: Saint-Denis, France
- Position: Defender

Senior career*
Years	Team	Apps	(Gls)
1977–88	Lens		
1988–95	Bordeaux		
1995–96	Toulouse		
1996–98	US Créteil		

International career
1984–87	France	3	(0)

Managerial career
- 2001: RC Lens
- * Club domestic league appearances and goals

Olympic medal record

Men's football

Representing France
Gold medal – first place	1984 Los Angeles	Team competition

Didier Sénac (born 2 October 1958) is a French former footballer who played as a defender. He obtained three international caps for the France national team during the early 1980s. A player of RC Lens (1977–1988), he was a member of the France national team that won the gold medal at the 1984 Summer Olympics in Los Angeles, California.

== Clubs ==
- RC Lens (1977–1988)
- Girondins de Bordeaux (1988–1995)
- Toulouse FC (1995–1996)
- US Créteil (1996–1998)
