= Gervais Martel =

French businessman

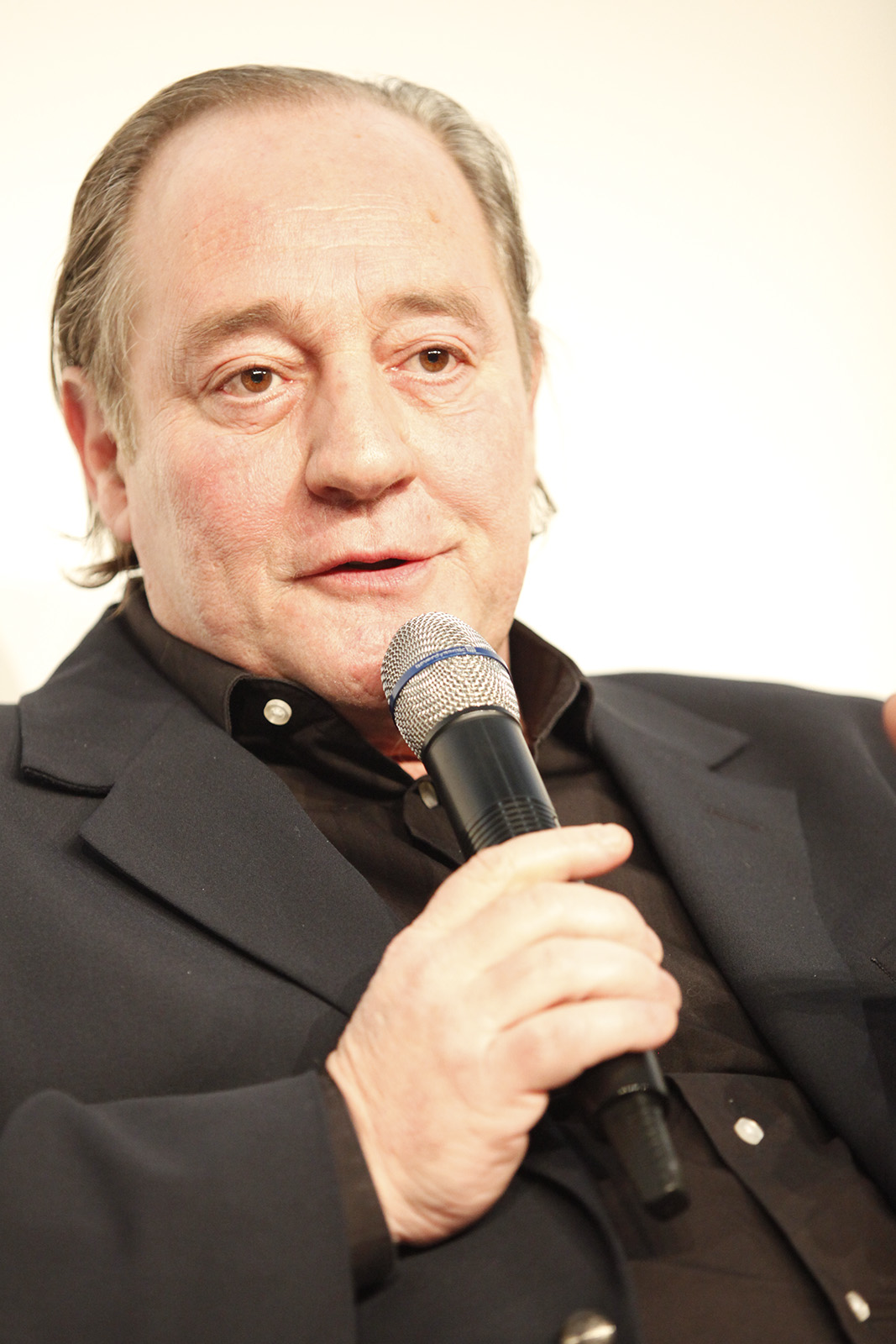
Gervais Martel

Gervais Martel (born 20 November 1954 in Oignies) is a French businessman who served as the president of French football club Lens from 1988 to 2012 and 2013 to 2017. Under his leadership, Lens won their first ever Division 1 title in the 1997–98 season, and won their first ever Coupe de la Ligue title the following year.

Martel is also a vice-president of the French Football Federation and serves on the federation's Federal Council.
