= Ahmed Oudjani =

Algerian footballer (1937-1998)

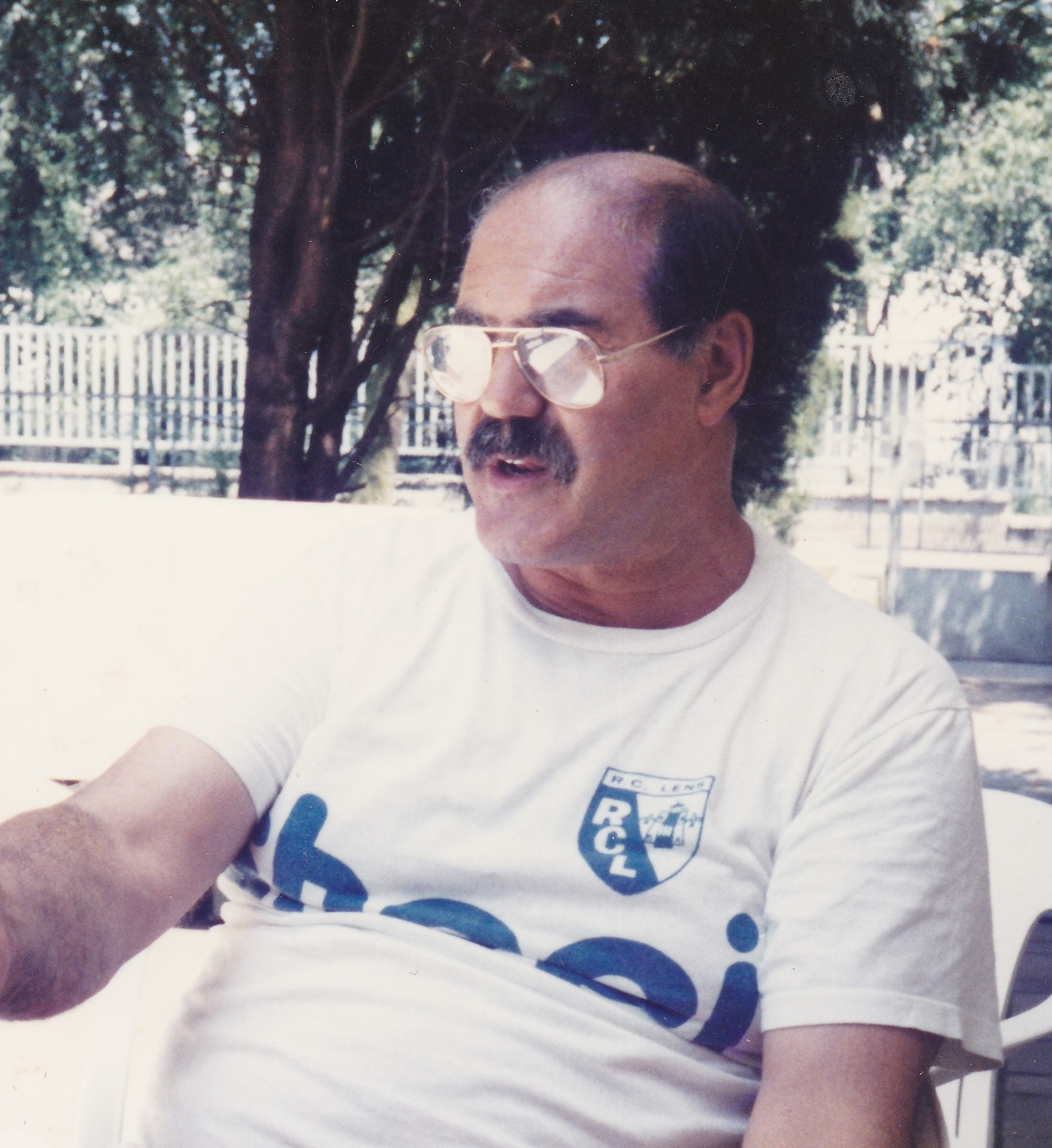
- Oudjani in 1997

Personal information
- Date of birth: 19 March 1937
- Place of birth: Philippeville (Skikda), Algeria
- Date of death: 14 January 1998 (aged 60)
- Position: Striker

Youth career
- 1955-1957: JSMP

Senior career*
Years	Team	Apps	(Gls)
1957–1958	US Vendôme		
1958–1965	Lens	148	(112)
1965–1966	RC Paris		
1966–1967	Sedan		
1967–1968	Caen		
1968–1969	US Tébessa		
1969–1971	JSM Béjaïa		

International career
- Algeria FLN
	Algeria	15	
- * Club domestic league appearances and goals

Ahmed Oudjani (19 March 1937 – 15 January 1998) was an Algerian football striker.

== Biography ==
Oudjani was a member of the Algerian FLN team before the country gained its independence. He is also the all-time top scorer in RC Lens history, having scored 94 goals in 148 matches for the team, including 6 goals in one game against RC Paris in the 1963/1964 season. He scored 99 career goals in Ligue 1, and was the leading scorer in the 1963–64 French Division 1 with 30 goals.

Ahmed is the father of former Algerian international Chérif Oudjani, who scored the winning goal in the final of the 1990 African Cup of Nations.

Ahmed's family is of Kabyle origin, and hails from the village of Sidi Aïch in Bejaïa.

== Honours ==
- Won the Coupe Drago three times with RC Lens in 1959, 1960 and 1965
- All-time top scorer in RC Lens history with 94 goals
- 15 caps with the Algerian National Team
