= 1997–98 Coupe de France =

Tournament details
- Country: France
- Teams: 6,106

Final positions
- Champions: Paris Saint-Germain
- Runners-up: Lens

Tournament statistics
- Top goal scorer(s): Sylvain Wiltord (4 goals)

The Coupe de France 1997–98 was its 81st edition. It was won by Paris SG.

The cup winner qualified for Cup Winners' Cup.

== Round of 64 ==
Team 1	Score	Team 2
Lens (D1)	2–1	Le Havre (D1)
Rennes (D1)	1–0	Châteauroux (D1)
Caen (D2)	1–0	Toulouse (D1)
Bastia (D1)	1–0	Niort (D2)
Cannes (D1)	2–0	Valence (D2)
Le Mans (D2)	1–1 (a.e.t.) (2–4 p)	Metz (D1)
Saint-Leu (Nat.)	0–2	Lyon (D1)
Épinal (Nat.)	2–1	Strasbourg (D1)
Thouars (Nat.)	1–3	Paris Saint-Germain (D1)
Sète (CFA)	0–3	Marseille (D1)
Dijon (CFA)	1–2 (a.e.t.)	Monaco (D1)
Aubervilliers (CFA)	1–7	Bordeaux (D1)
Segré (CFA)	1–2	Auxerre (D1
Thionville (CFA2)	1–5	Guingamp (D1)
Brétignolles-sur-Mer (DH)	0–3	Nantes (D1)
Toulon (D2)	4–2 (a.e.t.)	Nice (D2)
Sedan (Nat.)	3–1 (a.e.t.)	Louhans-Cuiseaux (D2)
Laval (D2)	1–3	Angoulême (Nat.)
Rouen (CFA)	0–1	Nancy (D2)
Châtellerault (CFA)	1–2	Sochaux (D2)
Carquefou (CFA2)	0–2	Wasquehal (D2)
Champagnole (DH)	0–2	Mulhouse (D2)
St-Jean-de-la-Ruelle (DH)	2–3	Beauvais (D2)
La Vitréenne (Ligue)	0–4	Lorient (D2)
Grau-du-Roi (DH)	0–0 (a.e.t.) (3–5 p)	Istres (Nat.)
Bourg-Péronnas (CFA)	4–2	Villefranche (CFA)
Boulogne (CFA)	2–0	Saint-Lô (CFA)
Pau (CFA)	0–0 (a.e.t.) (4–2 p)	Fontenay (CFA)
Muret (CFA)	1–1 (a.e.t.) (4–5 p)	Trélissac (CFA)
Alès (CFA)	3–0	Aurillac (CFA)
Vermelles (Ligue)	0–2	Argentan (CFA2)
Montpellier (D1)	3–0	Reims (CFA2)

== Round of 32 ==
Team 1	Score	Team 2
Monaco (D1)	1–0	Bordeaux (D1)
Metz (D1)	1–0	Bastia (D1)
Mulhouse (D2)	2–1 (a.e.t.)	Auxerre (D1)
Wasquehal (D2)	1–2	Guingamp (D1)
Cannes (D1)	3–1 (a.e.t.)	Beauvais (D2)
Caen (D2)	1–0	Nantes (D1)
Lorient (D2)	0–1	Paris Saint-Germain (D1)
Épinal (Nat.)	0–2 (a.e.t.)	Lens (D1)
Angoulême (Nat.)	0–2	Lyon (D1)
Istres (Nat.)	1–0	Rennes (D1)
Boulogne (CFA)	0–1	Marseille (D1)
Bourg-Péronnas (CFA)	3–2	Montpellier (D1)
Toulon (D2)	2–0	Nancy (D2)
Trélissac (CFA)	1–2	Sochaux (D2)
Argentan (CFA2)	0–0 (a.e.t.) (8–7 p)	Sedan (Nat.)
Pau (CFA)	2–2 (a.e.t.) (5–4 p)	Alès (CFA)

== Round of 16 ==
Team 1	Score	Team 2
Monaco (D1)	2–0 (a.e.t.)	Marseille (D1)
Cannes (D1)	0–2 (a.e.t.)	Mulhouse (D2)
Guingamp (D1)	1–1 (a.e.t.) (5–4 p)	Toulon (D2)
Istres (Nat.)	0–1 (a.e.t.)	Lyon (D1)
Pau (CFA)	0–1 (a.e.t.)	Paris Saint-Germain (D1)
Bourg-Péronnas (CFA)	2–0	Metz (D1)
Argentan (CFA2)	1–3	Lens (D1)
Sochaux (D2)	2–2 (a.e.t.) (5–6 p)	Caen (D2)

== Quarter-finals ==
20 March 1998	Guingamp (1)	1–0	Mulhouse (1)	Guingamp
	Coridon 89'			Stadium: Stade de Roudourou; Attendance: 20,648; Referee: Bernard Saules

20 March 1998	Caen (1)	1–2	Lens (1)	Caen
	Guerreiro 12'		Šmicer 57', 68'	Stadium: Stade Michel d'Ornano; Attendance: 20,648; Referee: Philippe Kalt

21 March 1998	Paris Saint-Germain (1)	1–0	Monaco (1)	Paris
	Dumas 78' (o.g.)			Stadium: Parc des Princes; Attendance: 19,377; Referee: Alain Sars

22 March 1998	Bourg-Péronnas (4)	0–1	Lyon	Lyon
			Carteron 62'	Stadium: Stade de Gerland; Attendance: 26,692; Referee: Pascal Garibian

== Semi-finals ==
11 April 1998	Lens (1)	2–0	Lyon (1)	Lens
	Ziani 24', 90'			Stadium: Stade Félix-Bollaert; Attendance: 38,269; Referee: Marc Batta

12 April 1998	Paris Saint-Germain (1)	1–0	Guingamp (1)	Paris
	Maurice 4'			Stadium: Parc des Princes; Attendance: 24,106; Referee: Claude Colombo

== Final ==
2 May 1998
20:00

Paris Saint-Germain	2–1	Lens
Raí 25'; Simone 53'		Šmicer 83'

Stade de France, Saint-Denis
Attendance: 78,265
Referee: Gilles Veissière

== Topscorer ==
Sylvain Wiltord (4 goals)
