= Cyrille Magnier =

French footballer (born 1969)

Personal information
- Date of birth: 24 September 1969 (age 57)
- Place of birth: Boulogne-sur-Mer, France
- Height: 1.83 m (6 ft 0 in)
- Position: Defender

Youth career
- 1984–1987: Lens

Senior career*
Years	Team	Apps	(Gls)
1987–1999	Lens	232	(1)
1999–2002	Auxerre	23	(0)
2002–2004	Amiens	41	(0)
2004–2005	Arras FA		
- * Club domestic league appearances and goals

Cyrille Magnier (born 24 September 1969) is a French former professional football defender who played with RC Lens, AJ Auxerre, Amiens SC and Arras FA.

Whilst at Lens, Magnier contributed 26 appearances as his side won 1997–98 French Division 1. The following season he played in the final as they won the 1998-99 Coupe de la Ligue.
