= Arnold Sowinski =

French footballer (1931–2020)

Personal information
- Date of birth: 17 March 1931
- Place of birth: Liévin, France
- Date of death: 2 April 2020 (aged 89)
- Place of death: Lens, France
- Position: Goalkeeper

Senior career*
Years	Team	Apps	(Gls)
1952–1966	RC Lens		

Managerial career
- 1969–1978: RC Lens
- 1979–1981: RC Lens
- 1988: RC Lens
- 1989: RC Lens
- * Club domestic league appearances and goals

Arnold Sowinski (17 March 1931 – 2 April 2020) was a French footballer who played with RC Lens. He also managed RC Lens on four occasions.

== Personal life ==
Sowinski was born in France and was of Polish descent.

Sowinski died of COVID-19 during the COVID-19 pandemic in France.
