= Yohan Lachor =

French footballer (born 1976)

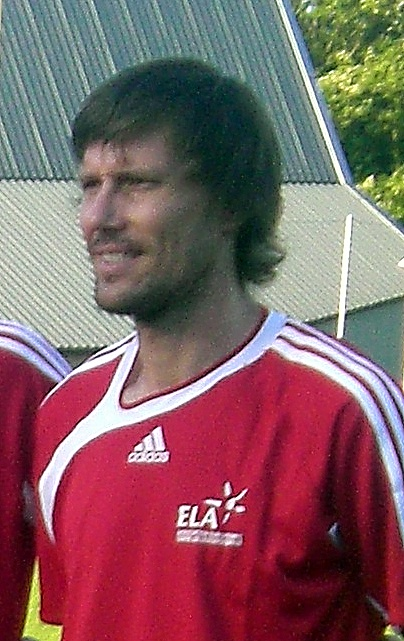

Personal information
- Date of birth: 17 January 1976 (age 50)
- Place of birth: Aire-sur-la-Lys, France
- Height: 1.87 m (6 ft 2 in)
- Position: Defender

Youth career
- Lens

Senior career*
Years	Team	Apps	(Gls)
1996–2000	Lens	72	(2)
2000–2001	Servette	26	(1)
2001–2006	Lens	76	(1)
2006–2008	Sedan	43	(2)
2008–2011	Boulogne	98	(2)
Total		315	(8)

Managerial career
- 2021–2022: Vimy
- * Club domestic league appearances and goals

Yohan Lachor (born 17 January 1976) is a French football manager and former football defender.

== Career ==
Lachor began his career as part of the youth academy at French club RC Lens. Lachor contributed 27 appearances as his side won 1997–98 French Division 1. He left the club in 2000, to join Swiss side Servette FC on loan, before moving back to Lens. In 2006, he left his boyhood club to join CS Sedan, before joining Ligue 2 side US Boulogne in 2008 helping the club to reach Ligue 1 in 2009.

== Managerial career ==
On 13 June 2021, Lachor was appointed as the manager of Vimy in the Championnat National 3.

== Honours ==
=== Club ===
Lens

- French Division 1: 1997–98
- Coupe de la Ligue: 1998–99
- UEFA Intertoto Cup: 2005
