= Vladimír Šmicer =

Czech footballer (born 1973)

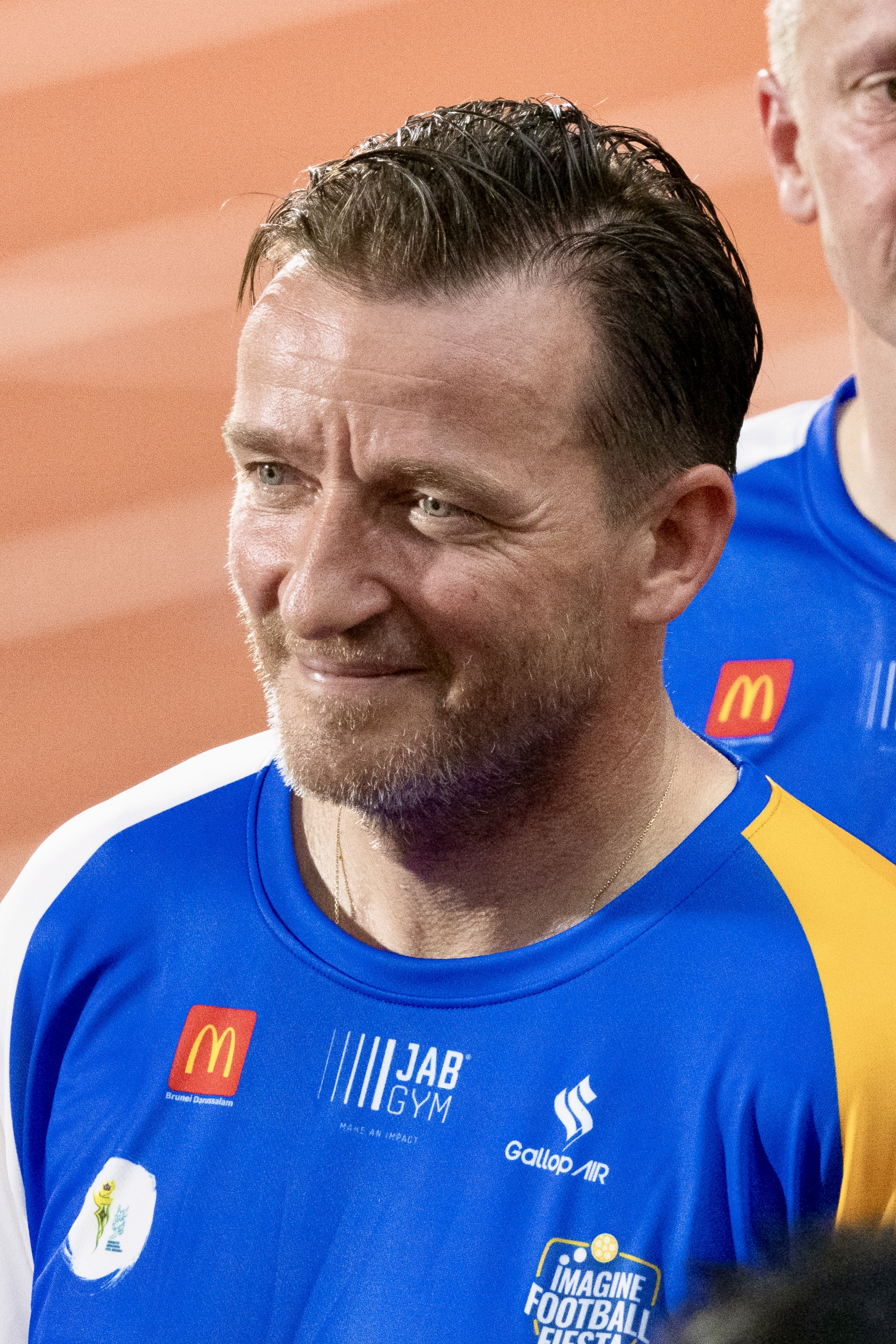
- Šmicer in 2024

Personal information
- Date of birth: 24 May 1973 (age 53)
- Place of birth: Děčín, Czechoslovakia
- Height: 1.78 m (5 ft 10 in)
- Position: Attacking midfielder

Youth career
- 1985–1987: Kovostroj Děčín
- 1987–1992: Slavia Prague

Senior career*
Years	Team	Apps	(Gls)
1992–1996	Slavia Prague	81	(26)
1996–1999	Lens	91	(16)
1999–2005	Liverpool	121	(10)
2005–2007	Bordeaux	28	(3)
2007–2009	Slavia Prague	23	(5)
Total		344	(60)

International career
1993	RCS	1	(0)
1994–2005	Czech Republic	80	(27)
Medal record
Representing Czech Republic
UEFA European Championship
Runner-up	1996 England
Bronze medal – third place	2004 Portugal
- * Club domestic league appearances and goals

Vladimír Šmicer (Czech pronunciation: [ˈʃmɪtsɛr]; born 24 May 1973) is a Czech former professional footballer who played as a midfielder. He started his senior career at Slavia Prague, the only Czech club he ever played for. In 1999, Šmicer moved to England where he played for Liverpool, winning multiple honours. He is perhaps best remembered at Liverpool for his long-range goal in the 2005 UEFA Champions League final victory against Milan. At Liverpool he also won a UEFA Cup, FA Cup and League Cup treble in 2001 as well as the 2003 League Cup.

He also played for French sides Lens, with whom he won the Ligue 1 title, and Bordeaux.

At international level, Šmicer played once for the Czechoslovak national side and 80 times for the Czech Republic. He retired from professional football in 2009.

== Club career ==
=== Early career ===
An attacking midfielder, Šmicer first shot to prominence in 1996, helping Slavia Prague reach the semi-finals of the 1995–96 UEFA Cup and then starring for the Czech Republic during their run to the UEFA Euro 1996 final.

Šmicer did not have to wait to be noticed at Euro 1996, as he signed a contract with French club Lens prior to the tournament. While at Lens, he enjoyed more success, inspiring the club to a first ever French title in 1997–98, their only title to date. That season he scored seven goals and was a leader on the ground. He played in the UEFA Champions League and played a pivotal role in the side's successes in this tournament.

He left Lens to move to Liverpool in June 1999.

=== Liverpool ===
Šmicer joined Liverpool for a fee of £4.2 million, recruited to fill the void left by the departure of Steve McManaman to Real Madrid. Upon arriving at Anfield in 1999, Šmicer was given the number 7 shirt, although he would later switch to number 11 after the arrival of Harry Kewell. When he left Liverpool in 2005, Šmicer said, "Just signing for Liverpool in itself was a dream because I supported them as a kid. It was a dream come true." He made his Liverpool debut in a match against Sheffield Wednesday at Hillsborough Stadium and scored his first Premier League goal in a 3–2 away win against Watford. His first campaign at Liverpool, however, was a difficult one as he struggled to come to terms with the pace of the English game and suffered a succession of injuries.

The 2000–01 season saw Šmicer (or "Vladi", as the Liverpool fans affectionately called him) fare much better. He scored his first Premier League goal of the season in a 4–3 loss to Leeds United at Elland Road and contributed to Liverpool's treble, starting in the FA Cup and League Cup finals and appearing as a substitute in the UEFA Cup final.

Unfortunately, Šmicer was plagued with injury problems, and a lack of consistency meant he was in and out of the team. However, there were some memorable moments for the Czech, including the last minute winner against Chelsea in 2002, and a stunning volley against Borussia Dortmund in Europe, along with his impressive performance in the 2–0 win over Roma in the Champions League at Anfield. A serious injury suffered in late 2003, however, blighted the remainder of his Liverpool career.

He returned to fitness in the 2004–05 season and, due to a severe injury crisis at the club, Šmicer began to feature prominently for Liverpool under new manager Rafael Benítez. His playing return coincided with Liverpool's quest for the Champions League as he made substitute appearances against Bayer Leverkusen, Juventus and Chelsea as Liverpool qualified for the Champions League final against Milan.

Prior to the final, it was decided by Benítez that Šmicer's contract was not to be renewed. Furthermore, Šmicer, who celebrated his 32nd birthday the day before, did not start the final. After 22 minutes, however, an injury to Harry Kewell gave him his opportunity to end his Liverpool career in style: "Before the final, I so was eager to get on. It was my last match for Liverpool so I was determined to end it in style. I was free in my head and that was my motivation – to do well for the club in my last match. I wanted to enjoy the big game."

Despite being named as a substitute, Šmicer was soon brought on for Kewell, who had suffered an injury. At that time the scoreline was 1–0 to Milan and Liverpool then went on to go 3–0 down at half time, but in the second half, Liverpool managed to command more of the pitch and just past the hour mark when Liverpool captain Steven Gerrard pulled a goal back from a John Arne Riise cross. Less than two minutes later, Šmicer struck a 20-yard shot which flew past Dida into the far right corner. After Xabi Alonso scored the equaliser, the match went into extra-time and then penalties, in which Šmicer scored the decisive penalty, his second "goal" of the final and his last ever kick for Liverpool. He celebrated his converted spot kick with a kiss of his shirt's badge in front of the Liverpool fans. Moments later, Jerzy Dudek saved Andriy Shevchenko's penalty to win both the shoot-out and the final for Liverpool.

=== Bordeaux ===
Šmicer moved on to Bordeaux in the summer of 2005. In the 2006–07 Champions League, Bordeaux were drawn against Liverpool in the group stages. He indicated his delight at returning to Anfield, although injury barred him from playing a part in either of the two matches between the sides. Šmicer suffered a serious knee injury that sidelined him for more than a year. The injury was the worst moment of his career and he even considered retiring. As a result, he missed the 2006 FIFA World Cup in Germany, but he did not retire. After another long recovery, Šmicer did not extend his contract in Bordeaux and left the club in the summer of 2007. He made 28 appearances and scored three goals during his time at the club.

=== Slavia Prague ===
In July 2007, Šmicer returned to Slavia Prague, where he signed a one-year contract. His return to Slavia sparked joy among the club's supporters. That season, Slavia won its first league title after 12 years, a triumph which Šmicer was also part of. Once again, this spell of his career was blighted by injuries. In 2008, he won the Personality of the League award at the Czech Footballer of the Year awards. He ended his football career after draw 0–0 with Viktoria Plzeň on 9 November 2009. He officially made farewell with professional football career at Synot Tip Arena in Prague on 11 May 2010, at the friendly match Slavia Prague – Sparta Prague, featuring legendary players of both clubs. Fifteen-thousand fans attended his last match.

== International career ==
Šmicer began his international career in 1993. He was an essential player in three UEFA European Championships for the Czech Republic, in total earning 80 caps and scoring 27 goals. He also has one cap for the Representation of Czechs and Slovaks team (the combined team of the Czech Republic and Slovakia after the dissolution of Czechoslovakia, as the nations started the 1994 FIFA World Cup qualification as the unified country).

Šmicer was part of the Czech Republic squad for Euro 1996. The then 22-year-old midfielder started the country's stunning campaign in England. The Czechs were down 3–2 in a game against Russia and needed to draw in order to qualify for the play-off rounds. Šmicer scored the all important equalizer two minutes before the end of the game. The Czechs then advanced through the play-offs to the final game, which they lost to Germany after extra-time.

Four years later, at Euro 2000, Šmicer scored both goals in the national team's only tournament victory, 2–0 against Denmark. At Euro 2004, he scored the winning goal in the team's 3–2 win over the Netherlands. In that game, the Czechs were 2–0 down after 20 minutes of play but still managed to recover. The comeback began an impressive march to the tournament's semi-finals. Šmicer has said the game against Netherlands was the most memorable moment in his international career.

Šmicer was unable to participate in the 2006 FIFA World Cup due to a leg injury.

Šmicer was only the second player to score at three European Championships (1996, 2000 and 2004), after Jürgen Klinsmann (1988, 1992 and 1996).

Although he did not play at Euro 2008, Šmicer made his debut as a television commentator during the tournament's opening match between hosts Switzerland and his native Czech Republic, held 7 June in Basel.

== Managerial career ==
Just one day after retiring from football, Šmicer became sports manager of the Czech national team, working alongside head coach Michal Bílek.

== Personal life ==
Šmicer is married to Pavlína Vízková, daughter of Olympic gold medal-winning footballer Ladislav Vízek. They have a daughter, Natalie, and a son, Jiří.

Šmicer stood for minor Czech party VIZE 2014 in the European Parliament election; his stated priority was to reduce obesity among children.

== Career statistics ==
=== Club ===
Club performance			League		Cup		League Cup		Continental		Total	
Season	Club	League	Apps	Goals	Apps	Goals	Apps	Goals	Apps	Goals	Apps	Goals
Czechoslovakia			League		Cup		League Cup		Continental		Total	
1992–93	Slavia Prague	First League	21	9			-	-	0	0		
Czech Republic			League		Czech Cup		League Cup		Europe		Total	
1993–94	Slavia Prague	Czech First League	18	6			-	-	2	0		
1994–95	Slavia Prague	Czech First League	16	3		0	-	-	1	1		3
1995–96	Slavia Prague	Czech First League	28	9	4	2	-	-	11	1	43	12
France			League		Coupe de France		Coupe de la Ligue		Europe		Total	
1996–97	Lens	Division 1	33	5	0	0	3	0	2	1	38	6
1997–98	Lens	Division 1	28	7	5	3	4	0	6	1	43	11
1998–99	Lens	Division 1	30	4	1	0	4	0	-	-	35	4
England			League		FA Cup		League Cup		Europe		Total	
1999–2000	Liverpool	Premier League	21	1	2	0	2	0	0	0	25	1
2000–01	Liverpool	Premier League	27	2	5	1	6	4	11	0	49	7
2001–02	Liverpool	Premier League	22	4	1	0	1	0	11	1	35	5
2002–03	Liverpool	Premier League	21	0	1	0	5	0	6	1	33	1
2003–04	Liverpool	Premier League	20	3	1	0	1	1	3	0	25	4
2004–05	Liverpool	Premier League	10	0	0	3	0	0	6	1	19	1
France			League		Coupe de France		Coupe de la Ligue		Europe		Total	
2005–06	Bordeaux	Ligue 1	25	3	0	0	2	0	-	-	27	3
2006–07	Bordeaux	Ligue 1	3	0	2	0	0	0	2	0	7	0
Czech Republic			League		Czech Cup		League Cup		Europe		Total	
2007–08	Slavia Prague	Czech First League	12	2	0	0	-	-	5	0	17	2
2008–09	Slavia Prague	Czech First League	8	3	3	0	-	-	4	0	15	3
2009–10	Slavia Prague	Czech First League	3	0	1	0	-	-	1	0	5	0
Total	Czechoslovakia		21	9					0	0		
Total	Czech Republic		85	23					24	2		
Total	France		119	19	8	3	13	0	10	2	150	24
Total	England		121	10	10	1	15	5	37	3	183	19
Career total			346	61					71	7		

=== International ===
Appearances and goals by national team and year
National team	Year	Apps	Goals
RCS	1993	1	0
RCS	Total	1	0
Czech Republic	1995	1	0
Czech Republic	1996	9	2
Czech Republic	1997	14	8
Czech Republic	1998	8	5
Czech Republic	1999	6	1
Czech Republic	2000	6	2
Czech Republic	2001	7	0
Czech Republic	2002	7	3
Czech Republic	2003	7	3
Czech Republic	2004	6	1
Czech Republic	2005	9	2
Czech Republic	Total	80	27
Total		81	27

Scores and results list Czech Republic's goal tally first, score column indicates score after each Šmicer goal.

List of international goals scored by Vladimír Šmicer
No.	Date	Venue	Opponent	Score	Result	Competition	Ref.
1	19 June 1996	Anfield, Liverpool, England	Russia	3–3	3–3	UEFA Euro 1996	
2	18 September 1996	Na Stínadlech, Teplice, Czech Republic	Malta	5–0	6–0	1998 FIFA World Cup qualification	
3	24 August 1997	Tehelné pole, Bratislava, Slovakia	Slovakia	1–0	1–2	1998 FIFA World Cup qualification	
4	6 September 1997	Svangaskarð, Toftir, Faroe Islands	Faroe Islands	1–0	2–0	1998 FIFA World Cup qualification	
5	11 October 1997	Letná Stadium, Prague, Czech Republic	Slovakia	1–0	3–0	1998 FIFA World Cup qualification	
6	13 December 1997	King Fahd International Stadium, Riyadh, Saudi Arabia	South Africa	1–0	2–2	1997 FIFA Confederations Cup	
7	13 December 1997	King Fahd International Stadium, Riyadh, Saudi Arabia	South Africa	2–1	2–2	1997 FIFA Confederations Cup	
8	17 December 1997	King Fahd International Stadium, Riyadh, Saudi Arabia	United Arab Emirates	3–0	6–1	1997 FIFA Confederations Cup	
9	17 December 1997	King Fahd International Stadium, Riyadh, Saudi Arabia	United Arab Emirates	5–0	6–1	1997 FIFA Confederations Cup	
10	17 December 1997	King Fahd International Stadium, Riyadh, Saudi Arabia	United Arab Emirates	6–0	6–1	1997 FIFA Confederations Cup	
11	25 March 1998	Andrův stadion, Olomouc, Czech Republic	Republic of Ireland	1–1	2–1	Friendly	
12	22 April 1998	Fazanerija City Stadium, Murska Sobota, Slovenia	Slovenia	1–1	3–1	Friendly	
13	21 May 1998	Kobe Universiade Memorial Stadium, Kobe, Japan	Paraguay	1–0	1–0	Friendly	
14	6 September 1998	Svangaskarð, Toftir, Faroe Islands	Faroe Islands	1–0	1–0	UEFA Euro 2000 qualifying	
15	10 October 1998	Koševo City Stadium, Sarajevo, Bosnia and Herzegovina	Bosnia and Herzegovina	2–0	3–1	UEFA Euro 2000 qualifying	
16	31 March 1999	Celtic Park, Glasgow, Scotland	Scotland	2–0	2–1	UEFA Euro 2000 qualifying	
17	21 June 2000	Stade Maurice Dufrasne, Liège, Belgium	Denmark	1–0	2–0	UEFA Euro 2000	
18	21 June 2000	Stade Maurice Dufrasne, Liège, Belgium	Denmark	2–0	2–0	UEFA Euro 2000	
19	13 February 2002	GSP Stadium, Nicosia, Cyprus	Cyprus	4–3	4–3	Friendly	
20	18 May 2002	Letná Stadium, Prague, Czech Republic	Italy	1–0	1–0	Friendly	
21	6 September 2002	Letná Stadium, Prague, Czech Republic	Yugoslavia	1–0	5–0	Friendly	
22	30 April 2003	Na Stínadlech, Teplice, Czech Republic	Turkey	3–0	4–0	Friendly	
23	11 June 2003	Andrův stadion, Olomouc, Czech Republic	Moldova	1–0	5–0	UEFA Euro 2004 qualifying	
24	6 September 2003	Dinamo Stadium, Minsk, Belarus	Belarus	3–1	3–1	UEFA Euro 2004 qualifying	
25	19 June 2004	Estádio Municipal, Aveiro, Portugal	Netherlands	3–2	3–2	UEFA Euro 2004	
26	4 June 2005	Stadion u Nisy, Liberec, Czech Republic	Andorra	3–1	8–1	2006 FIFA World Cup qualification	
27	12 November 2005	Ullevaal Stadion, Oslo, Norway	Norway	1–0	1–0	2006 FIFA World Cup qualification	

== Honours ==
Slavia Prague

- Czech First League: 1995–96, 2007–08, 2008–09

Lens

- Ligue 1: 1997–98
- Coupe de la Ligue: 1998–99

Liverpool

- FA Cup: 2000–01
- Football League Cup: 2000–01, 2002–03
- UEFA Champions League: 2004–05
- UEFA Cup: 2000–01

Bordeaux

- Coupe de la Ligue: 2006–07

Czech Republic

- UEFA European Football Championship runner-up: 1996
