= Mickaël Debève =

French footballer (born 1970)

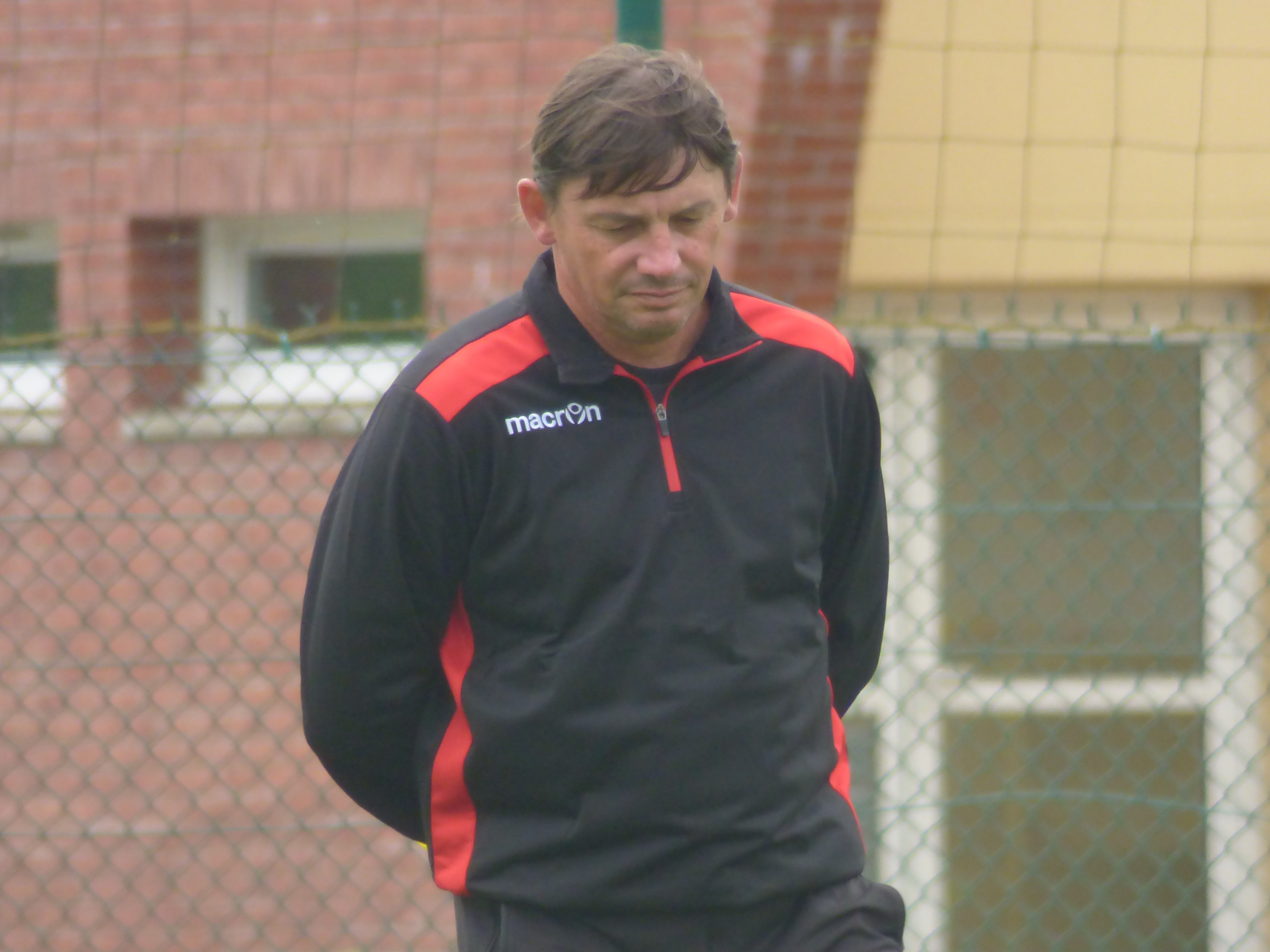

Personal information
- Date of birth: 1 December 1970 (age 55)
- Place of birth: Abbeville, France
- Height: 1.82 m (6 ft 0 in)
- Position: Midfielder

Youth career
- 1976–1984: JS Cambron
- 1984–1986: Abbeville
- 1986–1987: Toulouse

Senior career*
Years	Team	Apps	(Gls)
1987–1994	Toulouse	139	(14)
1994–2002	Lens	198	(14)
1999–2000	→ Le Havre (loan)	27	(2)
2002	Middlesbrough	4	(0)
2002–2004	Amiens	60	(1)
2004–2008	Abbeville		
Total		428	(31)

International career
1990–1991	France U21	8	(1)

Managerial career
- 2004–2008: Abbeville
- 2008–2012: Toulouse B
- 2013–2015: Toulouse B
- 2018: Toulouse
- * Club domestic league appearances and goals

Mickaël Debève (born 1 December 1970) is a French football manager and former football player who played as a midfielder. He is the assistant manager Ligue 1 club of Toulouse.

== Playing career ==
Born in Abbeville, Debève began his career at Toulouse; after a slow start - only four first-team appearances in three seasons, he became a main squad member. His first match in the top level came on 5 June 1987, in a 1–0 home win against Lens.

The most important part of Debève's career was spent at Lens, who he helped win the national league in 1998, adding the league cup the following year. In the 1998–99 UEFA Champions League, he scored the game's only goal at Wembley, against English champions Arsenal, making Lens the first club from France to win at that ground.

After totalling more than 400 official matches in his country, Debève moved to England with Middlesbrough in February 2002, arriving for free and rejoining former Lens mate Franck Queudrue. He made his debut as a substitute in the FA Cup 6th round victory over Everton. He was then thrust into the starting line up for the semi-final against Arsenal due to various injuries, making only his second Boro appearance against the team he had knocked out of the UEFA Champions League four years earlier. However, he could not prevent Boro losing 1–0. He left in the summer, and closed out his career in France's second level, with Amiens.

== Managerial career ==
Immediately after retiring, Debève became a manager, starting as player-coach with hometown side Abbeville.

Debève was named manager of Toulouse, the club where he started his playing career, on 23 January 2018, replacing Pascal Dupraz. Upon his appointment, Toulouse was 19th in Ligue 1 on 20 points from 22 matches (five wins, five draws, twelve losses), and facing relegation. In his first match in charge of Toulouse, they lost 2–0 away to Bourg-en-Bresse in the 2017-18 Coupe de France Round of 32.
