= Stéphane Ziani =

French footballer (born 1971)

Personal information
- Date of birth: 9 December 1971 (age 54)
- Place of birth: Nantes, France
- Height: 1.67 m (5 ft 6 in)
- Position: Attacking midfielder

Senior career*
Years	Team	Apps	(Gls)
1991–1995	Nantes	81	(3)
1994–1995	→ Bastia (loan)	38	(2)
1995–1996	Rennes	37	(1)
1996–1997	Girondins Bordeaux	37	(4)
1997–1998	Lens	32	(11)
1998–1999	Deportivo La Coruña	36	(6)
1999–2000	Bordeaux	20	(6)
2000–2001	→ Nantes (loan)	31	(4)
2001–2004	Nantes	88	(5)
2004	Servette	14	(0)
2005	Bastia	15	(1)
2005–2006	AC Ajaccio	7	(0)
Total		436	(43)

Managerial career
- 2008: FC Libourne-Saint-Seurin
- 2016: Fujairah SC
- * Club domestic league appearances and goals

Stéphane Ziani (born 9 December 1971) is a French former professional footballer who played as an attacking midfielder and is currently a manager.

== Club career ==
A product of FC Nantes's renowned youth system, Ziani was a key member for hometown squad from an early age, having represented the side on two separate stints: from 1991 to 94 and from 2000 to 2004.

As a holding midfielder, he scored 11 league goals for RC Lens in 1997–98 for his first national championship, also achieved in 2001 with Nantes (the latter of which he contributed 31 appearances). With Nantes he also won the 2001 Trophée des Champions.

Ziani retired in 2006, having also represented SC Bastia, Stade Rennais F.C., FC Girondins de Bordeaux, Deportivo de La Coruña, Servette FC and AC Ajaccio.

== Managerial career ==
On 11 December 2008, he was sacked as manager by FC Libourne-Saint-Seurin.

== Personal ==
Ziani's father is of Algerian origin, hailing from the Kabyle city of Béjaïa.

== Career statistics ==
Appearances and goals by club, season and competition
Club	Season	League			Cup (Note: Includes Coupe de France, Coupe de la Ligue and Copa del Rey.)		Continental (Note: Includes UEFA Cup, UEFA Champions League and UEFA Intertoto-Cup.)		Total	
Club	Season	Division	Apps	Goals	Apps	Goals	Apps	Goals	Apps	Goals
Nantes	1991–92	Division 1	28	1	–		–		28	1
Nantes	1992–93	Division 1	20	1	3	1	–		23	2
Nantes	1993–94	Division 1	33	1	4	0	2	0	39	1
Nantes	Total		81	3	7	1	2	0	90	4
Bastia	1994–95	Division 1	38	2	3	0	–		41	2
Rennes	1995–96	Division 1	37	1	3	0	–		40	1
Bordeaux	1996–97	Division 1	37	4	9	1	–		46	5
Lens	1997–98	Division 1	32	11	8	3	–		40	14
Deportivo	1998–99	Primera División	36	6	6	0	–		42	6
Bordeaux	1999–00	Division 1	20	6	6	0	6	0	32	6
Nantes	2000–01	Ligue 1	31	4	8	2	8	3	47	9
Nantes	2001–02	Ligue 1	29	1	1	0	9	1	39	2
Nantes	2002–03	Ligue 1	30	2	1	0	–		31	2
Nantes	2003–04	Ligue 1	29	2	5	0	3	0	37	2
Nantes	Total		119	9	15	2	20	4	154	15
Servette	2004–05	Super League	14	0	0	0	2	0	16	0
Bastia	2004–05	Ligue 1	15	1	0	0	–		15	1
Ajaccio	2005–06	Ligue 1	7	0	0	0	–		7	0
Career total			436	43	57	7	30	4	523	54
