= Éric Sikora =

French-Polish footballer (born 1968)

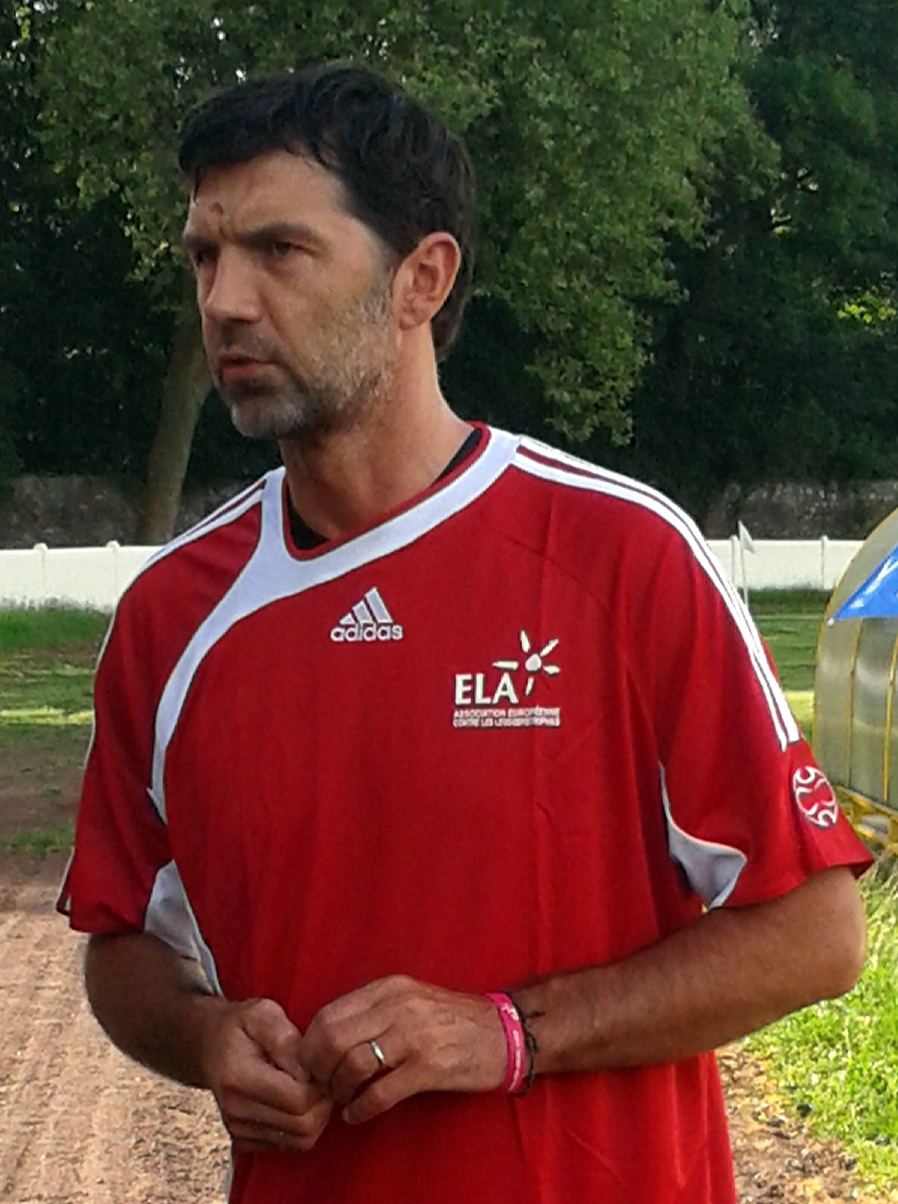
- Sikora in 2013

Personal information
- Date of birth: 4 February 1968 (age 58)
- Place of birth: Courrières, France
- Height: 1.82 m (6 ft 0 in)
- Position: Defender

Senior career*
Years	Team	Apps	(Gls)
1985–2004	RC Lens	497	(18)

International career
1986–1988	France U21	4	(0)

Managerial career
- 2005–2006: RC Lens (assistant coach)
- 2006–2012: RC Lens (assistant coach 2nd team)
- 2012–2013: RC Lens
- 2017–2018: RC Lens
- * Club domestic league appearances and goals

Éric Sikora (born 4 February 1968) is a French former footballer who played as a defender. He spent his whole career at RC Lens.

== Club career ==
Whilst at Lens Sikora contributed 33 appearances as his side won 1997–98 French Division 1. The following season he played in the final as they won the 1998-99 Coupe de la Ligue.

== International career ==
Sikora was born in France and is of Polish descent. Sikora was a youth international for the France U21s.

== Personal life ==
Sikora is the nephew of the French international footballer, François Ludo, who also played for RC Lens.

== See also ==
List of one-club men
