= Raphael Guerreiro (footballer, born 1968) =

French footballer

Personal information
- Date of birth: 24 April 1968 (age 58)
- Place of birth: Montreuil
- Height: 1.70 m (5 ft 7 in)
- Position: Midfielder

Youth career
- AJ Auxerre

Senior career*
Years	Team	Apps	(Gls)
1986–1995	AJ Auxerre		
1995–1998	SM Caen		
1998–2000	LB Châteauroux		
2000–2001	Racing Besançon		
- * Club domestic league appearances and goals

Raphael Guerreiro (born 24 April 1968) is a retired French football midfielder.
