= Daniel Leclercq =

French footballer and manager (1949–2019)

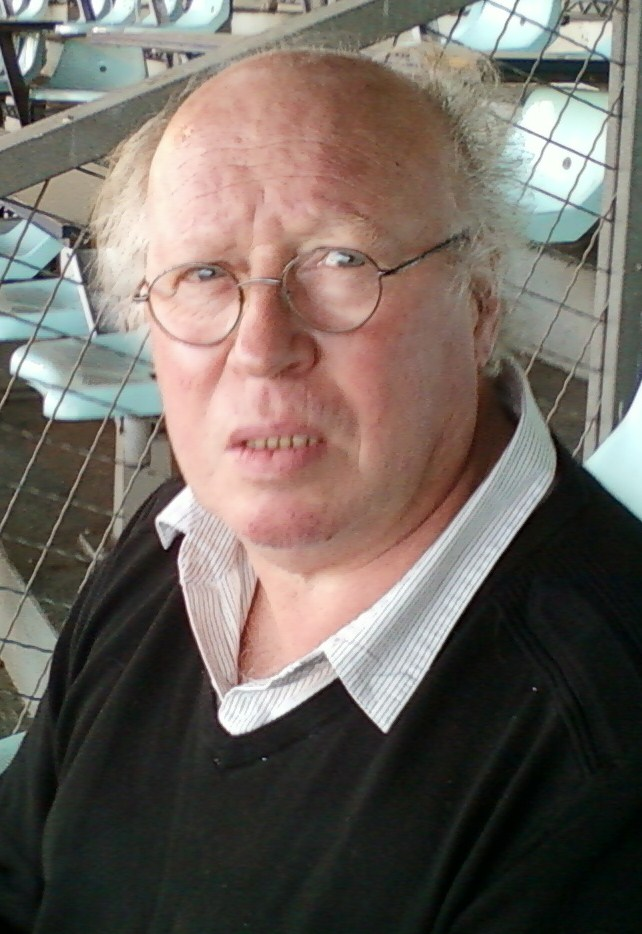
- Leclerq in 2011

Personal information
- Date of birth: 4 September 1949
- Place of birth: Trith-Saint-Léger, France
- Date of death: 22 November 2019 (aged 70)
- Place of death: Martinique, France
- Height: 1.83 m (6 ft 0 in)
- Position: Defender

Youth career
- 1961–1967: Valenciennes

Senior career*
Years	Team	Apps	(Gls)
1967–1970	Valenciennes	30	(3)
1970–1974	Marseille	75	(4)
1971–1972	→ Angoulême (loan)	14	(4)
1974–1983	Lens	289	(27)
1983–1984	Valenciennes	33	(2)
Total		441	(40)

Managerial career
- 1986–1987: Valenciennes
- 1997–1999: Lens
- 2001: La Louvière
- 2003–2005: Valenciennes
- 2009–2016: Arleux-Fechain
- 2017: Douai
- * Club domestic league appearances and goals

Daniel Leclercq (4 September 1949 – 22 November 2019) was a French football defender and manager. He played 440 matches from 1967 to 1984 for US Valenciennes, Olympique de Marseille and RC Lens. He later managed clubs from 1986 to 2017. He remains the only manager to have led RC Lens to the Ligue 1 championship.

== Biography ==
Leclercq was born 4 September 1949 in Trith-Saint-Léger, France and came up in the youth system of Valenciennes. Nicknamed le «Druide» (The Druid) for his long white hair, he played central defender for his entire career. In 1967, he made his first appearance in Ligue 1 with Valenciennes.

In 1970, he began a stint with Olympique de Marseille. In Marseille, he was part of a squad that won the Ligue 1 championship in the 1970–71 and 1971–72 seasons.

He also celebrated a championship in the 1972 Coupe de France and the 1972 Trophée des Champions.

In 1974, he began his long association with RC Lens. He played nine of his 17 seasons with the club, appearing in 289 matches and scored 27 goals. After leaving Lens, he played one more season with his hometown club, Valenciennes before retiring.

He obtained his first assignment as a manager with Valenciennes in 1986, serving for one season. In 1997, he was hired at Lens where he found his greatest success. In the 1997–1998 season, he managed the club to its only Ligue 1 championship, beating FC Metz on goal differential. His club also reached the 1998 Coupe de France Final where it fell to Paris Saint-Germain F.C. 2–1. In the 1998–99 UEFA Champions League, Lens played in the group stage of the tournament. Although it did not advance to the knockout round, the French squad defeated Arsenal F.C. on the road at Wembley Stadium. He achieved one more honor in 1999, winning the 1999 Coupe de la Ligue before leaving the team. He left Lens after his championship run and returned to Valenciennes for two more seasons in 2003.

He served as the technical director for Lens from 2008 to 2011. In 2009, he took on the managerial job at amateur club Arleux-Fechain through 2016. He spent one season with non-league SC Douai in 2017.

Leclercq died in Martinique on 22 November 2019 from a pulmonary embolism at the age of 70.
