= Jean-Guy Wallemme =

French footballer and manager (born 1967)

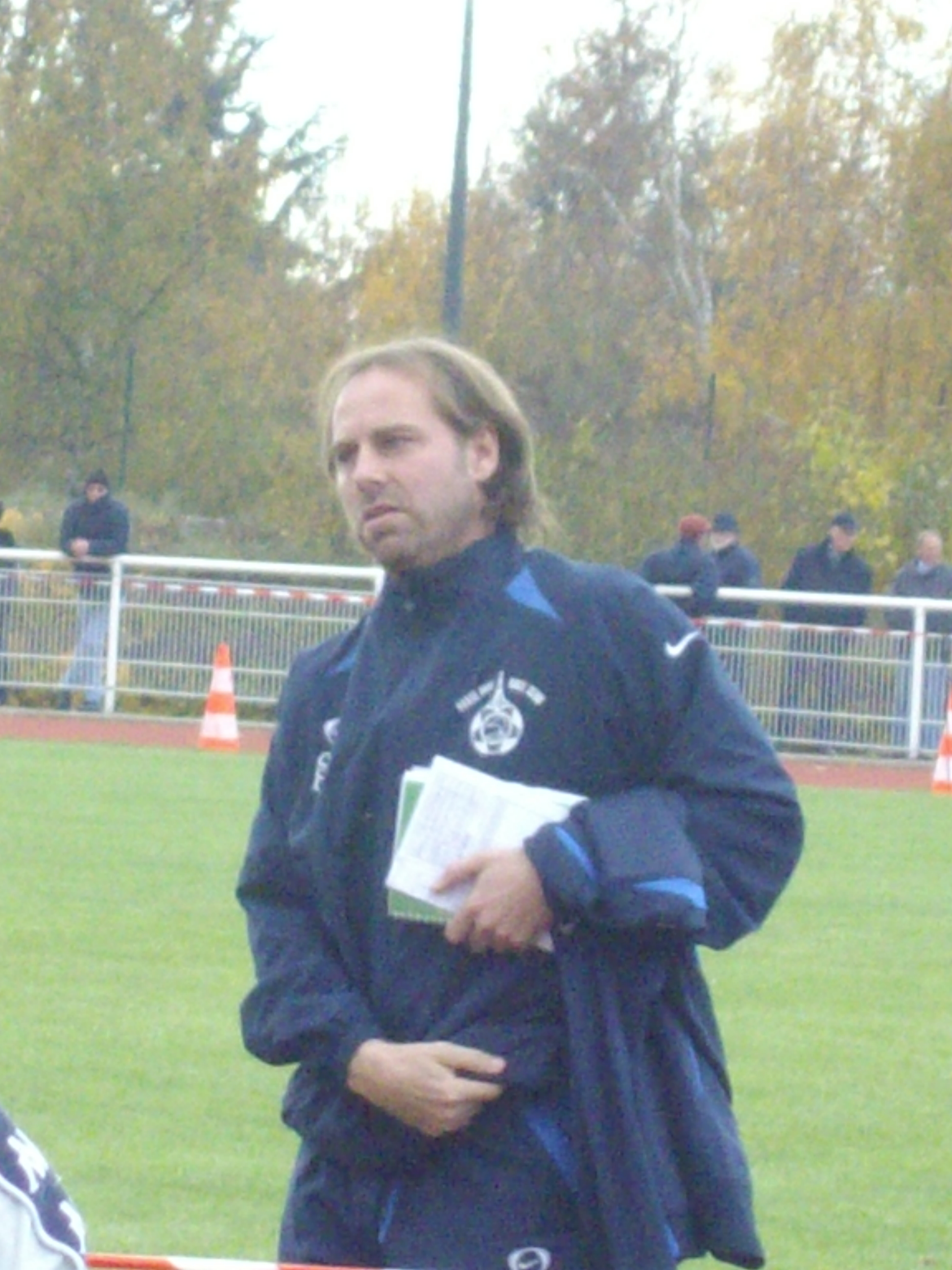
- Wallemme managing Paris FC in 2007

Personal information
- Date of birth: 10 August 1967 (age 59)
- Place of birth: Maubeuge, Nord, France
- Height: 1.84 m (6 ft 0 in)
- Position: Defender

Team information
- Current team: Stade béthunois FC (manager)

Senior career*
Years	Team	Apps	(Gls)
1986–1998	Lens	369	(12)
1998	Coventry City	6	(0)
1999	Sochaux	13	(0)
1999–2001	Saint-Étienne	51	(1)
2001–2002	Lens	32	(2)
Total		471	(15)

Managerial career
- 2001: Saint-Étienne (player-coach)
- 2002–2004: RC Paris
- 2004: Rouen
- 2005: Ronse
- 2005–2007: Roye
- 2007–2008: Paris FC
- 2008–2011: Lens
- 2011–2012: Congo
- 2012: Auxerre
- 2012–2013: R. White Star Bruxelles
- 2014: FC Brussels
- 2014–2015: USM Bel-Abbès
- 2015: JS Kabylie
- 2015–2016: ASO Chlef
- 2016: KAC Kénitra
- 2017–2018: FC Dieppe
- 2018–2019: C'Chartres
- 2019-2020: Niger
- 2020–2022: Fréjus Saint-Raphaël
- 2022: Paris 13 Atletico
- 2023: SR Colmar
- 2024–: Stade béthunois FC
- * Club domestic league appearances and goals

Jean-Guy Wallemme (born 10 August 1967) is a French professional football manager and former player who is the head coach of French sixth tier's side Stade béthunois FC.

== Playing career ==
Wallemme was a mainstay of the Lens team which won the French championship in 1998.

== Managerial career ==
In August 2011, Wallemme took over the Congo national team. On 23 March 2012, it was announced that he would combine his Congolese job with management of Auxerre. He left his job with Congo in October 2012.

In May 2018, Wallemme was announced as the manager of the newly merged club C'Chartres for the 2018–19 season. On 12 November 2019, it was confirmed, that Wallemme had become the new manager of the Niger national team, but still would continue as manager of C'Chartres as well. Wallemme was in charge for two games at the 2021 Africa Cup of Nations qualification and lost both against Ivory Coast and Madagascar. Ten days later, it was reported, that Wallemme had returned to France and that it was not sure that he would manage Niger later again, as he had not signed any deal with them.

In May 2020, Wallemme was released from his duties by C'Chartres, and within a few days had signed up to manage Fréjus Saint-Raphaël. In June 2022, he signed for Paris 13 Atletico. He then managed SR Colmar before heading north to manage Stade béthunois Football Club.
