= 1997–98 French Division 1 =

60th season of French Division 1

Division 1
- Season: 1997–98
- Dates: 2 August 1997 – 9 May 1998
- Champions: Lens (1st title)
- Relegated: Guingamp; Châteauroux; Cannes
- Matches: 306
- Goals: 722 (2.36 per match)
- Best player: Marco Simone
- Top goalscorer: Stéphane Guivarc'h (21 goals)
- Average attendance: 16,555

The 1997–98 Division 1 was the 60th season of Division 1, the top French professional league for association football clubs, since its establishment in 1932. The season began on 2 August 1997, and concluded on 9 May 1998.

This season saw a change in the league format, with the number of teams reduced to 18 from 20, shortening the season from 38 to 34 rounds. As a result, four clubs which had been relegated at the end of the previous season were replaced by only two, Châteauroux and Toulouse, who entered as winners and runners up of the 1996–97 French Division 2. Defending champions of the 1996–97 season were Monaco.

Lens won the championship for the first time in their 92-year history, becoming the 26th club to become French football champions. Lens won their league title with 68 points, edging out second-placed Metz on goal difference, for whom this was their best result in history.

== Teams ==
=== Stadia and personnel ===
Location of teams in 1997–98 Division 1

Team	Manager	Stadium	Capacity	Pos. in 1996–97
Auxerre	(France) Guy Roux	Stade de l'Abbé-Deschamps	21,379	6th
Bastia	(France) Frédéric Antonetti	Stade Armand Cesari	11,500	7th
Bordeaux	(France) Guy Stéphan	Parc Lescure	34,694	4th
Cannes	(Netherlands) Adick Koot	Stade Pierre-de-Coubertin	12,800	15th
Châteauroux	(France) Victor Zvunka	Stade Gaston Petit	17,072	1st (D2)
Guingamp	(France) Francis Smerecki	Stade du Roudourou	18,040	12th
Le Havre	(France) Denis Troch	Stade Jules Deschaseaux	16,382	14th
Lens	(France) Daniel Leclercq	Stade Bollaert	41,649	13th
Lyon	(France) Bernard Lacombe	Stade de Gerland	42,591	8th
Marseille	(France) Rolland Courbis	Stade Vélodrome	60,000	11th
Metz	(France) Joël Muller	Stade Saint-Symphorien	26,700	5th
Monaco	(France) Jean Tigana	Stade Louis II	18,523	1st
Montpellier	(France) Michel Mézy	Stade de la Mosson	32,950	10th
Nantes	(France) Raynald Denoueix	Stade de la Beaujoire	38,285	3rd
Paris Saint-Germain	(Brazil) Ricardo	Parc des Princes	48,527	2nd
Rennes	(France) Guy David	Stade de la Route de Lorient	29,778	16th
Strasbourg	(France) Jacky Duguépéroux	Stade de la Meinau	29,000	9th
Toulouse	(France) Alain Giresse	Stadium Municipal	36,500	2nd (D2)

== League table ==
Pos	Team	Pld	W	D	L	GF	GA	GD	Pts	Qualification or relegation
1	Lens (C)	34	21	5	8	55	30	+25	68	Qualification to Champions League group stage
2	Metz	34	20	8	6	48	28	+20	68	Qualification to Champions League second qualifying round
3	Monaco	34	18	5	11	51	33	+18	59	Qualification to UEFA Cup first round
4	Marseille	34	16	9	9	47	27	+20	57	Qualification to UEFA Cup first round
5	Bordeaux	34	15	11	8	49	41	+8	56	Qualification to UEFA Cup first round
6	Lyon	34	16	5	13	39	37	+2	53	Qualification to UEFA Cup first round
7	Auxerre	34	14	9	11	55	45	+10	51	Qualification to Intertoto Cup third round
8	Paris Saint-Germain	34	14	8	12	43	35	+8	50	Qualification to Cup Winners' Cup first round (Note: Paris Saint-Germain qualified for the 1998–99 UEFA Cup Winners' Cup as winners of the 1997–98 Coupe de France and 1997–98 Coupe de la Ligue.)
9	Bastia	34	13	11	10	36	31	+5	50	Qualification to Intertoto Cup second round
10	Le Havre	34	10	14	10	38	35	+3	44	
11	Nantes	34	11	8	15	35	41	−6	41	
12	Montpellier	34	10	11	13	32	42	−10	41	
13	Strasbourg	34	9	10	15	39	43	−4	37	
14	Rennes	34	9	9	16	36	48	−12	36	
15	Toulouse	34	9	9	16	26	46	−20	36	
16	Guingamp (R)	34	9	8	17	30	42	−12	35	Relegation to French Division 2
17	Châteauroux (R)	34	8	7	19	31	59	−28	31	Relegation to French Division 2
18	Cannes (R)	34	7	7	20	32	59	−27	28	Relegation to French Division 2

Source: Ligue 1
Rules for classification: 1) points; 2) goal difference; 3) number of goals scored.
(C) Champions; (R) Relegated
Notes:

Promoted from Ligue 2, who will play in Division 1 season 1998/1999

- AS Nancy : champion of Ligue 2
- FC Lorient : runners-up
- FC Sochaux-Montbéliard : third place

== Results ==
Home \ Away	AUX	BAS	BOR	CAN	CHA	GUI	LHA	RCL	OL	OM	MET	ASM	MHS	FCN	PSG	REN	RCS	TFC
Auxerre		2–0	4–2	1–1	5–0	1–0	0–0	1–1	1–2	2–1	0–0	3–1	3–1	3–1	2–3	4–0	1–2	3–1
Bastia	1–2		4–1	5–1	1–1	1–0	2–0	1–0	0–1	1–1	0–0	1–0	2–1	2–1	2–0	0–0	2–0	0–0
Bordeaux	3–2	2–0		0–1	1–0	4–2	2–1	3–0	0–0	2–0	2–2	1–0	3–1	1–1	0–0	2–2	4–4	3–1
Cannes	2–3	1–1	0–2		2–2	1–3	1–1	0–2	1–0	3–3	1–1	1–2	1–0	2–3	0–1	1–1	1–0	0–1
Châteauroux	3–2	1–1	1–0	1–2		2–2	2–1	2–1	2–3	0–3	1–2	0–2	0–1	1–2	2–1	1–0	2–0	2–1
Guingamp	1–1	0–0	0–1	3–1	0–0		1–2	2–1	0–1	1–1	0–1	1–2	1–2	1–0	0–0	1–0	0–0	2–0
Le Havre	2–2	2–1	0–0	2–0	5–0	0–0		0–1	1–3	1–1	2–1	1–1	4–0	1–0	1–1	1–1	1–1	1–1
Lens	3–0	5–1	1–0	5–4	1–0	1–0	0–0		3–0	0–1	1–1	1–0	0–0	0–0	3–0	3–0	3–2	2–0
Lyon	1–0	0–2	1–1	2–0	2–1	1–0	0–1	1–3		2–1	0–1	0–3	1–2	0–0	1–0	3–1	3–1	0–0
Marseille	4–0	1–0	1–0	2–0	2–0	3–0	3–1	2–3	1–0		2–0	1–1	0–0	1–0	0–0	0–1	0–0	2–0
Metz	3–0	0–1	4–1	2–0	2–0	2–1	2–0	0–2	1–0	3–2		3–0	0–1	3–2	2–1	1–0	1–0	2–1
Monaco	0–1	1–0	5–2	0–1	2–2	1–0	2–0	0–1	2–1	2–0	1–2		4–0	3–2	3–0	1–0	3–2	0–1
Montpellier	1–1	1–1	0–1	1–0	1–0	2–3	1–1	1–2	1–1	0–0	0–1	0–2		2–0	2–1	2–0	1–1	4–0
Nantes	0–2	0–1	1–2	1–2	3–1	2–0	2–0	1–0	3–2	1–0	1–1	1–1	1–1		0–0	1–1	2–1	0–1
Paris SG	1–0	2–0	0–1	3–1	2–0	4–2	0–2	2–0	3–0	1–2	1–1	1–2	1–1	0–1		4–1	2–1	1–1
Rennes	1–1	2–0	0–0	2–0	3–0	1–2	2–2	2–3	0–3	0–2	2–2	2–1	2–0	3–0	1–2		3–1	1–0
Strasbourg	1–1	1–1	0–0	2–0	2–0	0–1	0–1	2–1	1–2	2–0	2–0	0–0	3–0	1–2	0–3	3–1		2–0
Toulouse	2–1	1–1	2–2	1–0	1–1	3–0	1–0	1–2	0–2	0–4	0–1	1–3	1–1	1–0	0–2	1–0	1–1	

Source: Ligue 1
Legend: Blue = home team win; Yellow = draw; Red = away team win.

== Top goalscorers ==
Rank	Player	Club	Goals
1	(France) Stéphane Guivarc'h	Auxerre	21
2	(France) David Trezeguet	Monaco	18
3	(Nigeria) Victor Ikpeba	Monaco	16
4	(Federal Republic of Yugoslavia) Anto Drobnjak	Lens	14
4	(France) Lilian Laslandes	Bordeaux	14
6	(France) Bruno Rodriguez	Metz	13
6	(Italy) Marco Simone	Paris Saint-Germain	13
8	(France) Jocelyn Gourvennec	Nantes	12
9	(France) Laurent Blanc	Marseille	11
9	(France) Robert Pires	Metz	11
9	(France) Stéphane Ziani	Lens	11

== Awards ==
=== Individual awards ===
Award	Winner	Club
Ligue 1 Player of the Year	(Italy) Marco Simone	Paris Saint-Germain
Ligue 1 Young Player of the Year	(France) David Trezeguet	Monaco
Ligue 1 Manager of the Year	(France) Aimé Jacquet	Bordeaux
Ligue 1 Goalkeeper of the Year	(France) Fabien Barthez	Monaco

Team of the Year
Goalkeeper	(France) Fabien Barthez (Monaco)			
Defenders	(France) Éric Sikora (Lens)	(Cameroon) Rigobert Song (Metz)	(France) Laurent Blanc (Marseille)	(France) Manuel Dos Santos (Montpellier)
Midfielders	(France) Martin Djetou (Monaco)	(France) Johan Micoud (Bordeaux)	(France) Robert Pirès (Metz)	(France) Stéphane Ziani (Lens)
Forwards	(France) Stéphane Guivarc'h (Auxerre)	(Italy) Marco Simone (Paris Saint-Germain)		

== Attendances ==
No.	Club	Average attendance	Change
1	Paris Saint-Germain FC	36,723	3.2%
2	Olympique de Marseille	28,257	58.2%
3	RC Lens	27,959	21.7%
4	FC Nantes	23,303	4.2%
5	Olympique lyonnais	22,808	5.5%
6	Girondins de Bordeaux	21,019	3.8%
7	RC Strasbourg	17,266	-0.4%
8	FC Metz	16,353	11.2%
9	Toulouse FC	14,573	90.0%
10	MHSC	12,992	28.3%
11	Stade rennais	12,789	-2.9%
12	EA Guingamp	12,717	50.8%
13	La Berrichonne de Châteauroux	12,274	162.4%
14	Le Havre AC	11,192	5.7%
15	AJ auxerroise	10,054	-4.3%
16	AS Monaco	7,156	0.7%
17	SC Bastia	5,825	7.6%
18	OGC Nice	5,024	-7.5%
