= RC Lens =

Association football club in France

Lens
- Full name: Racing Club de Lens
- Nicknames: Les Sang et Or (The Blood and Gold)
- Short name: RCL
- Founded: 1906; 120 years ago
- Stadium: Stade Bollaert-Delelis
- Capacity: 38,223
- Owner: Joseph Oughourlian
- President: Joseph Oughourlian
- Head coach: Didier Digard
- League: Ligue 1
- 2025–26: Ligue 1, 2nd of 18
- Website: www.rclens.fr
Home colours	Away colours	Third colours

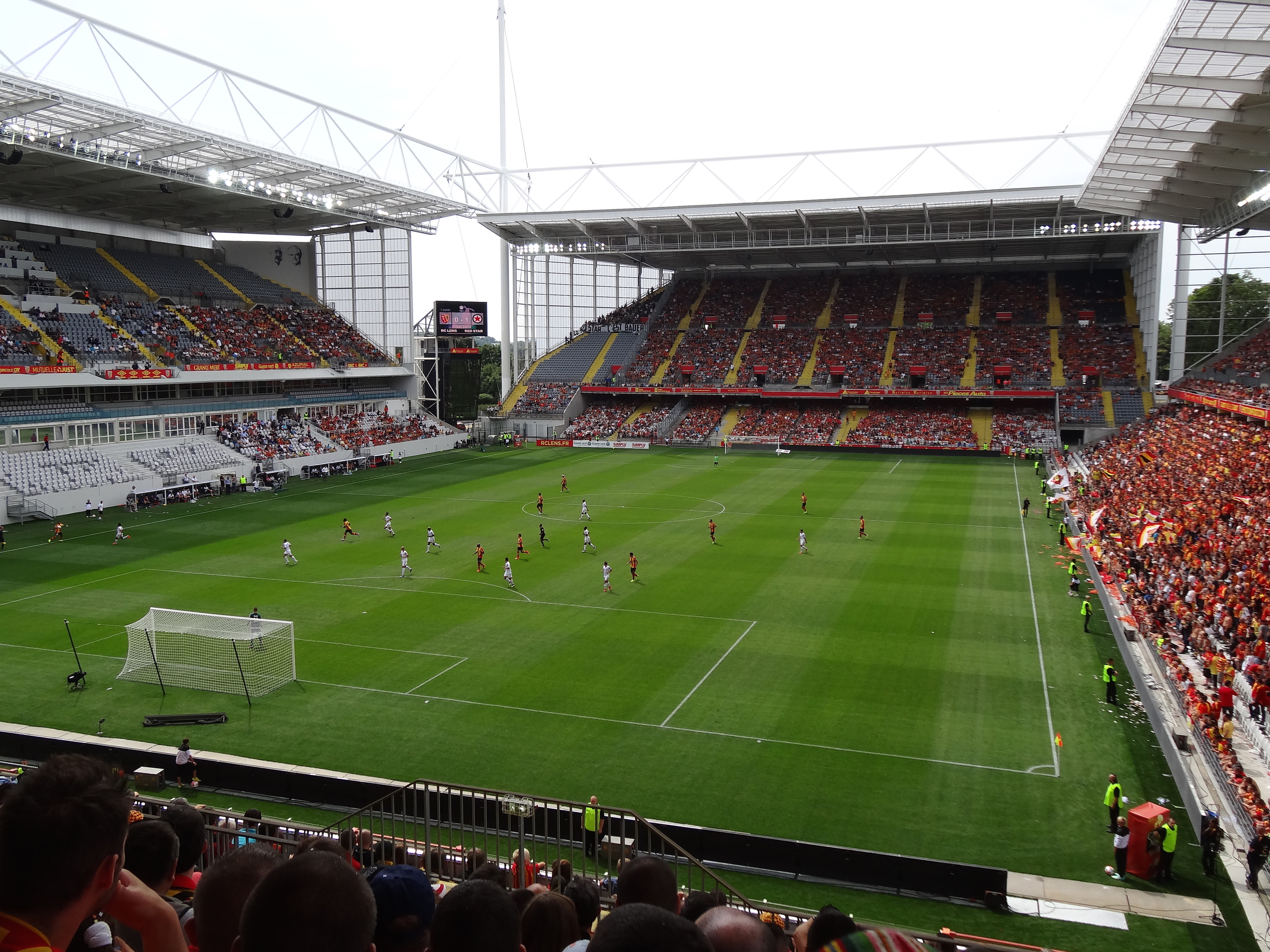
Stade Bollaert-Delelis, the home stadium of Lens

Racing Club de Lens (French pronunciation: [ʁasiŋ klœb də lɑ̃s]), commonly referred to as RC Lens or simply as Lens, is a French professional football club based in the northern city of Lens in the department of Pas-de-Calais. The club's nickname, Les Sang et Or (transl. The Blood and Gold), comes from its traditional colours of red and gold. As of the 2026–27 season, Lens competes in Ligue 1, the highest tier of French football.

Lens won the Division 1 (now Ligue 1) title in the 1997–98 season, and has finished as runner-up on five occasions, most recently in the 2025–26 season. Lens also finished as runner-up three times in Coupe de France before securing their maiden cup in 2026. Lens won the Trophée des Champions for the first time in 2026, having finished as runner-up in 1998. The club has a strong rivalry with neighbors Lille OSC, with whom they contest the Derby du Nord.

== History ==
=== Origin of the club ===
The origins of the club are not clearly documented, although most sources suggest that the club was established in 1906 under the name "Racing Club lensois". The name was chosen as a reference to Racing Club de Roubaix and Racing Club de France, both popular clubs at the time. The current name, "Racing Club de Lens", dates back to 1969.

The club originally played in green and black to represent the founding location; they wore green to represent the name of the home pitch, "Verte" (meaning 'green' in French), and black to represent the omnipresence of the coal mining industry in the surrounding area.

Between 1907 and 1912, the players were forced to change home grounds twice before settling at the Parc des Glissoires, situated between Avion and Lens.

During World War I, in common with all French sports clubs, the team's activities were stopped and did not restart until 1919. By this time, Lens had changed their playing colours to sky blue.

=== Of blood and gold ===
It was in 1924 that the red and gold colours first appeared. One legend says that Pierre Moglia, president of the club from 1923 to 1930, chose the colours of the Spanish flag after a colleague from the club remarked that the Saint-Léger church ruins, which they had walked past one evening, were the last visible remains of the local Spanish domination in 1648. Some people also say that the colours were derived as a reference to the local coal mines: the red for the blood of the miners and the gold for the coal which was valuable at the time.

It was also in 1924 that the club was authorised to play at the newly built municipal stadium Raoul Briquet (nowadays Léo Lagrange). The first match for the club in their new colours was played for the inauguration of the stadium.

In 1926, British footballer Kid Fenton was the first star who played for Lens. He stayed for eight seasons and became a strong favourite with the club's supporters. This was also the year the first supporters group was formed, and also saw the first occasion that Lens captured the Championnat d'Artois.

In 1929, Lens won the North championship and won promotion for the first time to the Division d'Honneur of the Ligue du Nord with the clubs Olympique Lillois, RC Roubaix, Excelsior Athlétic Club de Roubaix and AC Amiens.

In the Artois League, the club steadily gained prestige, and in 1932 the club inaugurated the Stade Félix Bollaert.

=== The coal-mining club ===
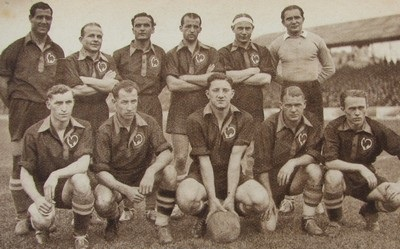
RC Lens squad during season 1937/1938

By the early 1930s, the club was supported by the powerful local mining company, the Compagnie des mines de Lens, and the club turned professional in 1934.

In 1937, Lens gained promotion to the first division after finishing first in the second division, led by such players as Stefan Dembicki and Spechtl. Lens even managed to reach the last 16 of the Coupe de France, although the team was eventually eliminated by the Red Star, 3–2.

In 1943, Lens won the first division of the Northern Zone thanks to Dembicki, who scored 43 goals in 30 games. A year earlier, in a Coupe de France match, he had scored 17 goals, which still remains to this day the world record for goals scored by one player in a single competitive match.

Immediately following World War II, Lens finished in sixth place in the 1945–46 season, but they were relegated the following year. In 1948, the club played its first Coupe de France final, which they lost 3–2 against Lille. A year later, Lens was promoted to the first division, and Maryan Wisnieski was recruited, in 1953. Problems with the board, however, made him quit the club; he joined Italian club UC Sampdoria Genoa, though without much success.

In 1962, the city of Lens' mines were shut down and the future of the club was at stake, given that most of the players were miners by profession. Between 1956 and 1968, survival was hard. Nevertheless, in 1964, Lens finished third, with Ahmed Oudjani the top scorer with 30 goals. Another famous player, Georges Lech, joined Lens, although the club was relegated in 1968. The following year, the mine's administrators rescinded their ownership of Lens, which signalled the end of professional football at the Stade Bollaert-Delelis. Lens was now once again an amateur club, one year after its relegation, and the long-term future looked very bleak.

=== The good years and the fall ===
However, better days arrived in 1960 after the town council took interest in Racing Club de Lens. Lens' mayor, André Delelis, was a long-term supporter and recognized the importance of the club's success to the overall morale of the city. With the future president, Jean Bondoux, the mayor brought together volunteers and subscriptions to help the club survive. Moreover, the city recovered ownership of the stadium from the closing mine industry.

The following twenty years saw a slow but steady improvement in the club's fortunes. In 1972, Lens reached the semi-finals of the Coupe de France, and the arrival of two Polish players helped the club win promotion to the first division. In 1975, Lens once again reached the final of the Coupe de France against the powerful Saint-Étienne, but lost the game 0–2.

As finalist of the Coupe de France, Lens had the opportunity to participate in its first UEFA Cup Winners' Cup, but the team was knocked out quickly by the Dutch club ADO Den Haag.

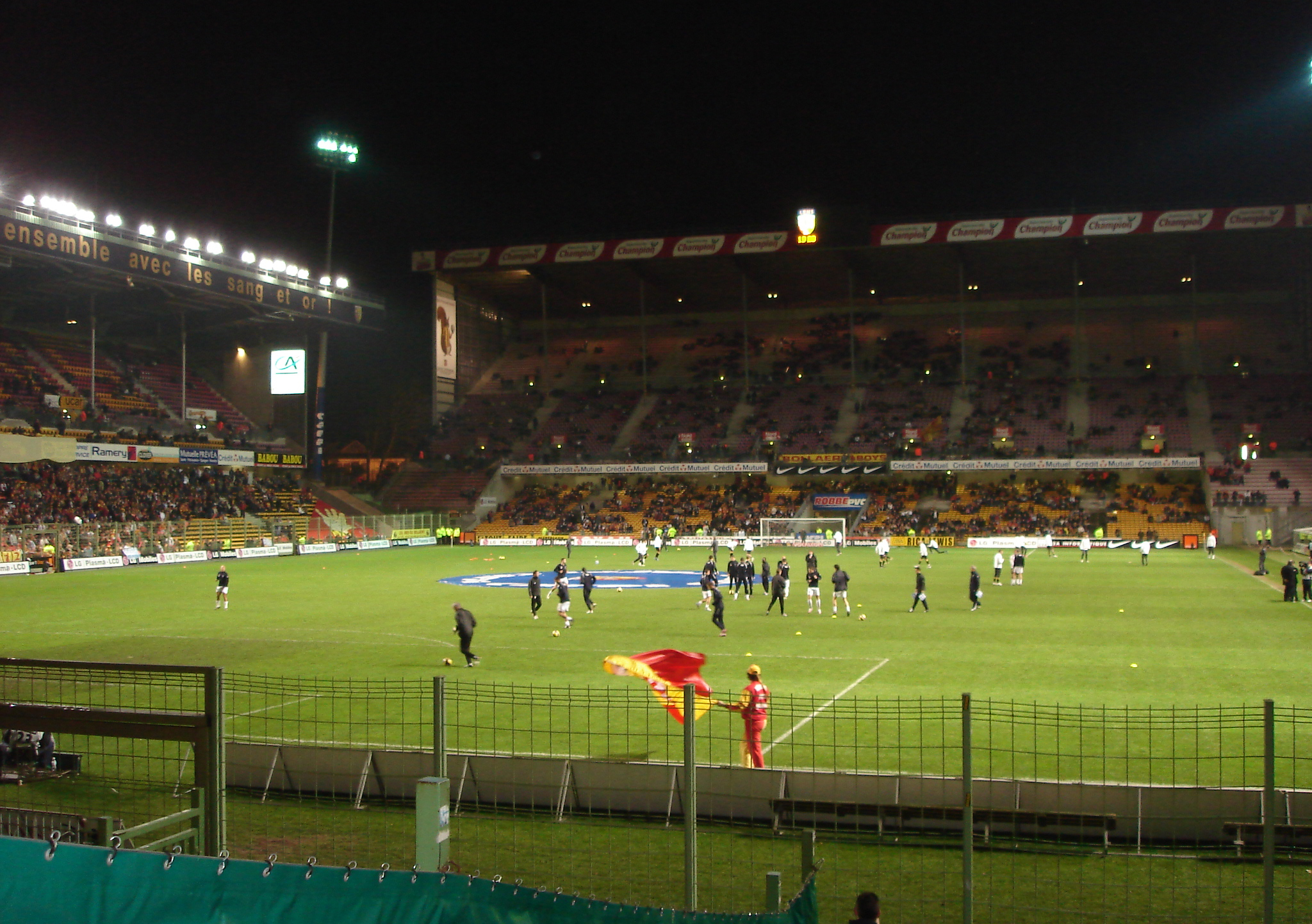
Stade Félix Bollaert

Lens' steady progress continued, and after finishing second in the league behind Nantes, they managed to qualify to the UEFA Cup. They knocked out Swedish club Malmö FF, and the strong Italian club Lazio. After an away defeat (2–0), they won 6–0 at the Stade Bollaert-Delelis after extra-time. They were then eliminated by East German side 1. FC Magdeburg. The club was relegated to the second division in 1978.

The club secured immediate promotion back to the French elite level in 1979 with Roger Lemerre as head coach. During the 1980s, Gérard Houllier and Joachim Marx succeeded him. These were great gains to the team, even though the club lost important players such as Didier Sénac, Gaëtan Huard and Philippe Vercruysse.

=== Martel's takeover ===
In August 1988 Gervais Martel, a wealthy local businessman, bought control of the club, with the help of Serge Doré. During the same year, Arnaud Dos Santos was named head coach of the club, and led the club back to the first division in 1991.

In 1993 and 1994, Lens' strongest team to that date were highly competitive at the top of the league, and the team qualified for the UEFA Cup twice in a row. Lens also reached the semi-final of the Coupe de France after knocking out Paris Saint-Germain at the Parc des Princes, although the team lost to Montpellier.

In 1998, les Sang et Or wrote the best page of their history under Daniel Leclercq ("the Druid"): French champions, Coupe de la Ligue semi-finalists and finalists of the Coupe de France (against PSG, a 2–1 defeat). Like a symbol, it is a player who started his career in Lens, Yohan Lachor, who scored the goal in Auxerre giving Lens the title in front of Metz. Under the "Druid", Lens won its second major title in 1999 with the Coupe de la Ligue against Metz, with a goal from Daniel Moreira. That year, in the UEFA Champions League, Lens also became the only club to have beaten English team Arsenal at Wembley Stadium (1–0, with a goal from Mickaël Debève), although they were knocked out on aggregate score over two matches.

During the next season, Leclercq was fired, but Lens nonetheless did well to reach the semi-finals of the UEFA Cup. François Brisson's men were eventually eliminated by Arsenal, after they won against 1. FC Kaiserslautern (a 4–1 win in Germany), Atlético Madrid and Celta de Vigo.

In the 2001–02 season, Joël Muller was named head coach. Lens finished second that season and qualified for its second Champions League campaign. The club, however, finished in eighth for the next two years. Muller was replaced during his fourth season by Francis Gillot, who managed to qualify Lens for the UEFA Intertoto Cup, which Lens won, ensuring qualification for the UEFA Cup.

During the 2006–07 season, the Sang et Or finished the first part of the season in second, behind Lyon. But due to a chaotic second half, however, they only finished fifth. A few days later, Francis Gillot resigned.

On 5 June 2007, Guy Roux made his comeback, although it only lasted three months: He resigned after a 2–1 defeat at Strasbourg. Jean-Pierre Papin took over, but Lens could not make up any ground throughout the season, finishing 18th, two points behind Toulouse, resulting in relegation to Ligue 2 for the next season. Lens finished the season with just 40 points, winning only 9 times in 38 matches.

After a slow start in their only year in Ligue 2, they managed to finish as leaders during the first half of the season. Earning 13 out of 15 points in their first five games of the second half, everything looked set for a quick return to the first league. After only taking five points of the next six games, however, the promotion race was open again, although Lens recovered and became champions, securing promotion to Ligue 1 for 2009–10. After the 2010–11 season, however, they again dropped to Ligue 2.

On 16 May 2014, Lens sealed promotion back to Ligue 1 on the final day of the season following a 2–0 win at Bastia. On 27 June, however, the League's National Directorate of Management Control (DNCG) blocked Lens' promotion to the top flight due to irregularities in the club's proposed budget for its next season. The issue was a €10 million payment due from major shareholder Hafiz Mammadov that was missing from the accounts. Lens president Gervais Martel claimed a public holiday in Mammadov's native Azerbaijan had resulted in the delay and said the club would appeal. On 15 July, however, their promotion was in jeopardy after an appeal commission upheld their appeal since the missing funds still had not yet arrived in the club's accounts. Lens immediately declared their intention to appeal to the French Olympic Committee (CNOSF), which has the power to overrule the DNCG. On 25 July, the CNSOF recommended Lens should be allowed to play in Ligue 1. Because the Stade Bollaert-Delelis was being renovated for UEFA Euro 2016, Lens played their home matches for the 2014–15 Ligue 1 season at the Stade de la Licorne, home of Amiens, and at the Stade de France in Saint-Denis.

It was announced on 29 January 2015 that Lens' promotion from Ligue 2 at the end of the 2013–14 season has been ruled invalid, and will thus be automatically relegated to Ligue 2 for the 2015–16 season, regardless of where the team places. Thus, in August 2015 Lens returned to Ligue 2, albeit playing at the renovated Stade Bollaert-Delelis. They drew an average home attendance of 28,996 in the 2016–17 season, the highest in Ligue 2 but missed promotion to the Ligue 1 during a tumultuous last day of the season.

=== New direction and return to Ligue 1 ===
In the 2017–18 Ligue 2 season, Lens lost their first seven matches in a row, the worst start to a season in the club's history. On 18 September, Lens finally got their first win of the season over US Quevilly-Rouen 2–0.

In the 2018–19 Ligue 2 season, Lens finished fifth and reached the promotion play off final against Dijon. After a 1–1 draw in the first leg, Lens would lose the second leg and the tie 3–1 after two goalkeeping blunders by Jérémy Vachoux cost his side a chance of promotion to Ligue 1.

On 30 April 2020, Lens were promoted to Ligue 1 after the LFP decided to end the seasons of both Ligue 1 and Ligue 2 early due to the COVID-19 pandemic. Lens were second on the table in Ligue 2 at the time of the decision.

In the 2020–21 season, Lens finished seventh on the Ligue 1 table after an impressive first season back in France's top flight. They finished seventh again in the following season with 62 points, despite being ranked second behind Paris Saint-Germain in the first half of the season.

At the start of the 2022–23 season, Lens won its first 10 home games. On 1 January 2023, Lens beat PSG 3–1, who had been unbeaten since the start of the season. On 27 May, Lens won 3–0 against Ajaccio, finished second in Ligue 1 just one point behind Paris Saint-Germain. The team qualified for the Champions League for the third time in their history after 1998–99 and 2002–03.

The following two seasons were disappointing for the Lens supporters, as the team finished seventh then eighth in the league, respectively. In June 2024, Will Still replaced Franck Haise as head coach. In June 2025, Pierre Sage took over as head coach.

The 2025–26 season saw the club finish runners-up and qualified for the Champions League. On 22 May 2026, Lens won its first Coupe de France trophy in a 3–1 victory against Nice. On 16 August 2026, Lens won its first Trophée des Champions (the French super cup) in a 1–0 victory against PSG.

In May 2026, RC Lens and Auchan extended their partnership until 2031, ensuring that the retailer remains the club's principal sponsor for an additional five seasons.

== Honours ==
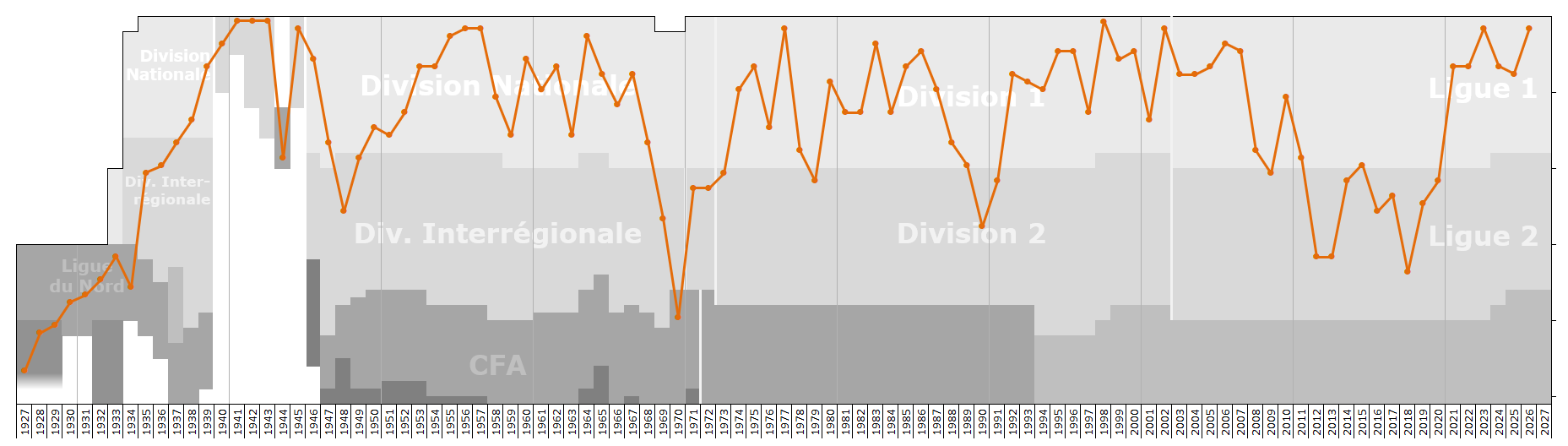
Historical league performance chart of RC Lens

- Ligue 1
  - Winners (1): 1997–98
  - Runners-up (6): 1955–56, 1956–57, 1976–77, 2001–02, 2022–23, 2025–26
- Ligue 2
  - Winners (4): 1936–37, 1948–49, 1972–73, 2008–09
  - Runners-up: (2): 2013–14, 2019–20
- Coupe de France
  - Winners (1): 2025–26
  - Runners-up (3): 1947–48, 1974–75, 1997–98
- Coupe de la Ligue
  - Winners (2): 1993-94,1998–99
  - Runners-up (1): 2007–08
- Trophée des Champions
  - Winners (1): 2026
  - Runners-up (1): 1998
- Coupe Drago
  - Winners (3): 1959, 1960, 1965
  - Runners-up (1): 1957
- UEFA Cup
  - Semi-finalists (1): 1999–2000
- UEFA Intertoto Cup
  - Winners (1): 2005

== Records ==
- Record league win: 10–2 (v. RC Paris, 1963–64).
- Record European Cup win: 7–0 (v. Avenir-Beggen, 1995–96).
- The European exploit: v. Lazio (6–0 after extra time, 2 November 1977).
- Most goals in a single match: 16, Stefan Dembicki (a world record), (v. Auby Asturies, French Cup, 13 December 1942). Final score: 32–0.
- Most league appearances with Lens: 497, Éric Sikora and 377, Bernard Placzek.
- Most league goals in a season: 30, Ahmed Oudjani (1963–64) and 20, Roger Boli (1993–94).
- Top scorer: 94, Ahmed Oudjani.
- Highest attendance at a home match: 48,912, (v. Marseille, Ligue 1, 15 February 1992) at Stade Bollaert-Delelis. Lens won 2–1.

== Players ==
=== Current squad ===
As of 12 August 2026

Note: Flags indicate national team as defined under FIFA eligibility rules; some limited exceptions apply. Players may hold more than one non-FIFA nationality.

No.	Pos.	Nation	Player
1	GK	FRA	Régis Gurtner
2	DF	FRA	Ruben Aguilar
3	DF	POL	Maik Nawrocki
4	DF	BIH	Nidal Čelik
5	MF	MNE	Andrija Bulatović
6	DF	AUT	Samson Baidoo
7	FW	FRA	Florian Sotoca
8	MF	ALG	Yacine Titraoui
9	FW	BEL	Thorgan Hazard
10	MF	FRA	Florian Thauvin (captain)
11	FW	FRA	Odsonne Édouard
13	DF	ECU	Jhoanner Chávez
14	DF	FRA	Matthieu Udol
16	GK	FRA	Mathieu Gorgelin
19	FW	SEN	Abdallah Sima

No.	Pos.	Nation	Player
20	DF	FRA	Jean-Clair Todibo (on loan from West Ham United)
21	MF	MLI	Amadou Haidara
22	MF	POL	Michał Skóraś
23	DF	KSA	Saud Abdulhamid
24	DF	FRA	Jonathan Gradit
25	DF	FRA	Ismaëlo Ganiou
27	MF	FRA	Michaël Cuisance
28	FW	COD	Junior Kadile (on loan from Servette)
29	FW	CRO	Franjo Ivanović (on loan from Benfica)
31	DF	MLI	Souleymane Sagnan
32	DF	FRA	Kyllian Antonio
38	MF	POR	Mezian Mesloub
40	GK	FRA	Robin Risser
60	GK	FRA	Ilan Jourdren

=== Out on loan ===
Note: Flags indicate national team as defined under FIFA eligibility rules; some limited exceptions apply. Players may hold more than one non-FIFA nationality.

No.	Pos.	Nation	Player
—	GK	ITA	Mattia Fortin (at Palermo until 30 June 2027)
—	GK	BFA	Hervé Koffi (at Union SG until 30 June 2027)
—	MF	FRA	Ilan Ducourtioux (at Le Puy until 30 June 2027)
—	FW	SWE	Jeremy Agbonifo (at Jagiellonia Białystok until 30 June 2027)
—	FW	FRA	Anthony Bermont (at Angers until 30 June 2027)

No.	Pos.	Nation	Player
—	FW	FRA	Gabin Capuano (at Quevilly-Rouen until 30 June 2027)
—	FW	FRA	Samuel Dié (at Cannes until 30 June 2027)
—	FW	CIV	Rayan Fofana (at Le Havre until 30 June 2027)
—	FW	CAF	Goduine Koyalipou (at Kortrijk until 30 June 2027)
—	FW	GLP	Rémy Labeau Lascary (at Auxerre until 30 June 2027)

=== Retired numbers ===
12 – (France) Club Supporters (the 12th Man)
17 – (Cameroon) Marc-Vivien Foé, Midfielder (1994–99) – posthumous honour

== Former players ==
Three Lens players won the gold medal in the 1984 Los Angeles Olympic Games: defender Didier Sénac, as well as strikers François Brisson and Daniel Xuereb who scored a goal apiece in France's triumph over Brazil 2–0 in the final at the Pasadena Rose Bowl in front of a crowd of 103,000.

For a complete list of RC Lens players, see Category:RC Lens players

=== French internationals ===
As of 17 July 2023

Rank	Name	Position	Caps with Lens	Total Caps
1	Maryan Wisnieski	Forward	33	33
2	Georges Lech	Forward	16	35
3	Xercès Louis	Midfielder	12	12
4	Didier Six	Forward	11	52
5	Alou Diarra	Midfielder	11	44
6	Guillaume Bieganski	Defender	5	9
7	Philippe Vercruysse	Midfielder	4	12
8	Jonathan Clauss *	Defender	4	6
9	Ladislas Smid	Midfielder	4	4
10	Tony Vairelles	Forward	3	8
11	Daniel Xuereb	Forward	3	8
12	Pierre Laigle	Midfielder	2	8
13	Daniel Moreira	Forward	2	3
14	Didier Sénac	Defender	2	3
15	François Brisson	Forward	2	2
16	Edmond Novicki	Forward	2	2
17	Michel Stievenard	Forward	2	2
18	Frédéric Déhu	Defender	1	5
19	Farès Bousdira	Midfielder	1	1
20	Paul Courtin	Forward	1	1
21	Jean Desgranges	Forward	1	1
22	Raymond François	Midfielder	1	1
23	Richard Krawczyk	Midfielder	1	1
24	Marcel Ourdouillié	Midfielder	1	1
25	Brice Samba *	Goalkeeper	1	1
26	Raphaël Varane *	Defender	0	93
27	Loïc Rémy	Forward	0	30
28	Eric Carrière	Midfielder	0	11
29	Geoffrey Kondogbia *	Midfielder	0	5
30	Alphonse Areola *	Goalkeeper	0	3

* Still playing.

== Club officials ==
Position	Staff
Sports coordinator	(France) Grégory Thil
Head coach	(France) Didier Digard
Assistant coach	(France) Éric Sikora (Algeria) Bilal Hamdi
Technical coach	(Albania) Ervin Skela
Goalkeeping coach	(France) Cédric Berthelin
Fitness coach	(France) Vincent Lannoy
Opponent analyst	(Portugal) Nélson Morgado
Video analyst	(France) Pierre capitaine
Club doctor	(France) Dr. Eric Furmaniak
Physiotherapist	(France) Philippe Darques
Scout	(Tunisia) Alaeddine Yahia
Performance manager	(France) Guillaume Ravé

== Presidents ==
- 1906–07: Jules J. Van den Weghe
- 1907–08: Arthur Lotin
- 1908–12: Jules J. Van den Weghe
- 1912–20: Charles Douterlingne
- 1920–23: Fleury Pierron
- 1923–30: René Moglia
- 1930–33: Renou
- 1933–34: Jules A. Van den Weghe
- 1934–57: Louis Brossart
- 1957–59: Vital Lerat
- 1959–68: Albert Hus
- 1968–72: René Houdart
- 1972–76: Jean Bondoux
- 1976–79: Jean-Pierre Defontaine
- 1979–86: Jean Bondoux
- 1986–88: Jean Honvault
- 1988–2012: Gervais Martel
- 2012–13: Luc Dayan
- 2013–17: Gervais Martel
- 2017–: Joseph Oughourlian

== Coaches ==
Former coaches include two ex-France coaches: Gérard Houllier (1982–85) managed France between July 1992 and November 1993, and Roger Lemerre (second half of the 1996–97 season, then as assistant coach 1997–98), who coached France between July 1998 and July 2002.

- Jack Harris (1934)
- Robert De Veen (1934–1936)
- Jack Galbraith (1936–1938)
- Raymond François (1938)
- József Eisenhoffer (1938–1939)
- Jack Galbraith (1939)
- Richard Buisson (1939–1941)
- Georges Beaucourt (1941–1942)
- Anton Marek (1942–1947)
- Nicolas Hibst (1947–1950)
- Ludvic Dupal (1950–1953)
- Anton Marek (1953–1956)
- Félix Witkowski (1956–1958)
- Karel Michlowski (1956–1958)
- Jules Bigot (1958–1962)
- Élie Fruchart (1962–1969)
- Arnold Sowinski (1970–1978)
- Roger Lemerre (1978–1979)
- Arnold Sowinski (1979–1981)
- Jean Serafin (1981–1982)
- Gérard Houllier (1982–1985)
- Joachim Marx (1985–1988)
- Arnold Sowinski (1988)
- Jean Parisseaux (1988–1989)
- Philippe Redon (1989)
- Marcel Husson (1989–1990)
- Arnaud Dos Santos (1990–1992)
- Patrice Bergues (1992–1996)
- Slavoljub Muslin (1996–1997)
- Roger Lemerre (1997)
- Daniel Leclercq (1997–1999)
- François Brisson (1999–2000)
- Rolland Courbis (2000–2001)
- Georges Tournay (2001)
- Joël Muller (2001–2005)
- Francis Gillot (2005–2007)
- Guy Roux (2007)
- Jean-Pierre Papin (2007–2008)
- Jean-Guy Wallemme (2008–2011)
- László Bölöni (2011)
- Jean-Louis Garcia (2011–2012)
- Éric Sikora (2012–2013)
- Antoine Kombouaré (2013–2016)
- Alain Casanova (2016–2017)
- Éric Sikora (2017–2018)
- Philippe Montanier (2018–2020)
- Franck Haise (2020–2024)
- Will Still (2024–2025)
- Pierre Sage (2025–2026)
- Dino Toppmöller (2026)
- Yannick Cahuzac (2026)
- Didier Digard (2026–)

== See also ==
- Derby du Nord
