= 1995–96 FC Girondins de Bordeaux season =

Bordeaux
1995–96 season
- President: Alain Afflelou and Jean-Didier Lange
- Head coach: Slavoljub Muslin (until February); Gernot Rohr (from February)
- Stadium: Stade du Parc Lescure
- French Division 1: 16th
- Coupe de France: Round of 32
- Coupe de la Ligue: Round of 32
- UEFA Intertoto Cup: Winners
- UEFA Cup: Runners-up
- Top goalscorer: League: Anthony Bancarel (7); All: Zinedine Zidane (12)
colours	colours	colours

The 1995–96 season was the 115th season in the existence of FC Girondins de Bordeaux and the club's fourth consecutive season in the top flight of French football. In addition to the domestic league, Bordeaux participated in this season's editions of the Coupe de France, the Coupe de la Ligue and the UEFA Intertoto Cup. The season covered the period from 1 July 1995 to 30 June 1996.

== Competitions ==
=== Overall record ===
Competition	First match	Last match	Starting round	Final position	Record							
Competition	First match	Last match	Starting round	Final position	Pld	W	D	L	GF	GA	GD	Win %
French Division 1	19 July 1995	18 May 1996	Matchday 1	16th	38	11	9	18	44	52	−8	28.95
Coupe de France	13 January 1996	3 February 1996	Round of 64	Round of 32	2	1	0	1	6	4	+2	50.00
Coupe de la Ligue	13 December 1995		Round of 32	Round of 32	1	0	1	0	1	1	+0	0.00
UEFA Intertoto Cup	1 July 1995	22 August 1995	Round of 64	Winners	8	6	2	0	22	5	+17	75.00
Total					49	18	12	19	73	62	+11	36.73

Source: Competitions

=== French Division 1 ===
==== League table ====
Pos	Team	Pld	W	D	L	GF	GA	GD	Pts	Qualification or relegation
14	Cannes	38	12	8	18	45	51	−6	44	
15	Bastia	38	12	8	18	45	55	−10	44	
16	Bordeaux	38	11	9	18	44	52	−8	42	
17	Lille	38	9	12	17	27	50	−23	39	
18	Gueugnon (R)	38	8	14	16	27	46	−19	38	Relegation to French Division 2

Source: Ligue 1
Rules for classification: 1) points; 2) goal difference; 3) number of goals scored.
(R) Relegated

==== Results summary ====
Overall								Home						Away					
Pld	W	D	L	GF	GA	GD	Pts	W	D	L	GF	GA	GD	W	D	L	GF	GA	GD
38	11	9	18	44	52	−8	42	10	6	3	35	17	+18	1	3	15	9	35	−26

Source: French Division 1

==== Results by round ====
Round	1	2	3	4	5	6	7	8	9	10	11	12	13	14	15	16	17	18	19	20	21	22	23	24	25	26	27	28	29	30	31	32	33	34	35	36	37	38
Ground	H	H	A	H	A	H	A	H	A	H	A	H	A	H	A	H	A	H	A	A	H	A	H	A	H	A	H	A	H	A	H	A	H	A	H	A	H	A
Result	W	W	L	W	L	L	D	W	L	W	L	D	L	D	L	L	D	W	L	L	L	L	W	L	W	D	W	L	D	L	W	L	D	L	D	L	D	W
Position	5	3	5	8	12	15	14	8	10	7	9	9	11	12	13	13	14	12	14	14	16	16	16	15	13	14	13	14	15	16	14	15	15	15	15	16	16	16

Source: French Division 1
A = Away; H = Home; W = Win; D = Draw; L = Loss

==== Matches ====
19 July 1995 1	Bordeaux	1–0	Lille	Bordeaux
CEST (UTC+2)				Stadium: Stade du Parc Lescure

26 July 1995 2	Bordeaux	2–0	Saint-Étienne	Bordeaux
CEST (UTC+2)				Stadium: Stade du Parc Lescure

5 August 1995 3	Bastia	2–0	Bordeaux	Furiani
CEST (UTC+2)

19 August 1995 5	Guingamp	1–0	Bordeaux	Guingamp
CEST (UTC+2)

26 August 1995 6	Bordeaux	2–4	Monaco	Bordeaux
CEST (UTC+2)				Stadium: Stade du Parc Lescure

29 August 1995 7	Gueugnon	2–2	Bordeaux	Gueugnon
CEST (UTC+2)

1 September 1995 4	Bordeaux	3–0	Nantes	Bordeaux
CEST (UTC+2)				Stadium: Stade du Parc Lescure

9 September 1995 8	Bordeaux	2–1	Cannes	Bordeaux
CEST (UTC+2)				Stadium: Stade du Parc Lescure

17 September 1995 9	Le Havre	1–0	Bordeaux	Le Havre
CEST (UTC+2)

22 September 1995 10	Bordeaux	3–0	Montpellier	Bordeaux
CEST (UTC+2)				Stadium: Stade du Parc Lescure

1 October 1995 11	Strasbourg	3–0	Bordeaux	Strasbourg
CEST (UTC+2)

4 October 1995 12	Bordeaux	1–1	Lyon	Bordeaux
CEST (UTC+2)				Stadium: Stade du Parc Lescure

14 October 1995 13	Metz	2–0	Bordeaux	Metz
CEST (UTC+2)

21 October 1995 14	Bordeaux	0–0	Rennes	Bordeaux
CEST (UTC+2)				Stadium: Stade du Parc Lescure

27 October 1995 15	Martigues	3–1	Bordeaux	Martigues
CEST (UTC+2)

4 November 1995 16	Bordeaux	0–1	Auxerre	Bordeaux
CET (UTC+1)				Stadium: Stade du Parc Lescure

8 November 1995 17	Lens	0–0	Bordeaux	Lens
CET (UTC+1)

18 November 1995 18	Bordeaux	4–1	Nice	Bordeaux
CET (UTC+1)				Stadium: Stade du Parc Lescure

25 November 1995 19	Paris Saint-Germain	3–0	Bordeaux	Paris
CET (UTC+1)

1 December 1995 20	Saint-Étienne	2–0	Bordeaux	Saint-Étienne
CET (UTC+1)

9 December 1995 21	Bordeaux	1–3	Bastia	Bordeaux
CET (UTC+1)				Stadium: Stade du Parc Lescure

16 December 1995 22	Nantes	2–0	Bordeaux	Nantes
CET (UTC+1)

10 January 1996 23	Bordeaux	2–0	Guingamp	Bordeaux
CET (UTC+1)				Stadium: Stade du Parc Lescure

20 January 1996 24	Monaco	2–0	Bordeaux	Monaco
CET (UTC+1)

27 January 1996 25	Bordeaux	3–1	Gueugnon	Bordeaux
CET (UTC+1)				Stadium: Stade du Parc Lescure

7 February 1996 26	Cannes	1–1	Bordeaux	Cannes
CET (UTC+1)

10 February 1996 27	Bordeaux	3–1	Le Havre	Bordeaux
CET (UTC+1)				Stadium: Stade du Parc Lescure

17 February 1996 28	Montpellier	3–0	Bordeaux	Montpellier
CET (UTC+1)

27 February 1996 29	Bordeaux	1–1	Strasbourg	Bordeaux
CET (UTC+1)				Stadium: Stade du Parc Lescure

1 March 1996 30	Lyon	1–0	Bordeaux	Lyon
CET (UTC+1)

9 March 1996 31	Bordeaux	4–0	Metz	Bordeaux
CET (UTC+1)				Stadium: Stade du Parc Lescure

23 March 1996 32	Rennes	4–3	Bordeaux	Rennes
CET (UTC+1)

9 April 1996 34	Auxerre	2–0	Bordeaux	Auxerre
CEST (UTC+2)

20 April 1996 35	Bordeaux	0–0	Lens	Bordeaux
CEST (UTC+2)				Stadium: Stade du Parc Lescure

26 April 1996 36	Nice	1–0	Bordeaux	Nice
CEST (UTC+2)

5 May 1996 33	Bordeaux	1–1	Martigues	Bordeaux
CEST (UTC+2)				Stadium: Stade du Parc Lescure

11 May 1996 37	Bordeaux	2–2	Paris Saint-Germain	Bordeaux
CEST (UTC+2)				Stadium: Stade du Parc Lescure

18 May 1996 38	Lille	0–2	Bordeaux	Lille
CEST (UTC+2)

=== Coupe de France ===
13 January 1996 Round of 64	US Pont-de-Roide	1–4	Bordeaux	Montbéliard
15:00 CET (UTC+1)				Stadium: Stade Auguste Bonal; Attendance: 8,025

3 February 1996 Round of 32	SC Toulon	3–2 (a.e.t.)	Bordeaux	Toulon
20:00 CET (UTC+1)				Stadium: Stade Mayol; Attendance: 13,000

=== Coupe de la Ligue ===
13 December 1995 Round of 32	Bordeaux	1–1 (a.e.t.) (4–5 p)	Saint-Étienne	Bordeaux
20:00 CET (UTC+1)	Friis-Hansen 4'		Thimothée 45'; Moravčík (penalty missed) 70'	Stadium: Stade du Parc Lescure; Attendance: 3,110; Referee: Philippe Kalt

=== UEFA Intertoto Cup ===
1 July 1995 1	Bordeaux (France)	6–2	(Sweden) IFK Norrköping	Bordeaux
	Tholot 5', 14', 56'; Zidane 6', 64'; Prunier 88'		Jansson 68'; P. Karlsson 73'	Stadium: Stade du Parc Lescure; Attendance: 5,626; Referee: Lawrence Sammut (Malta)

8 July 1995 2	Bohemians (Republic of Ireland)	0–2	(France) Bordeaux	Dublin, Republic of Ireland
			Dugarry 43'; Zidane 84'	Stadium: Dalymount Park; Attendance: 1,500; Referee: Alan Howells (Wales)

15 July 1995 3	Bordeaux (France)	4–0	(Denmark) Odense BK	Bordeaux
	Zidane 18'; Prunier 52'; Tholot 56'; Lizarazu 63' (pen.)			Stadium: Stade du Parc Lescure; Attendance: 7,842; Referee: José Núñez Manrique (Spain)

23 July 1995 4	HJK (Finland)	1–1	(France) Bordeaux	Helsinki, Finland
	Kottila 78'		Bancarel 81'	Stadium: Helsinki Olympic Stadium; Attendance: 1,647; Referee: Andrei Butenko (Russia)

==== Round of 16 ====
29 July 1995 Round of 16	Bordeaux (France)	3–0	(Germany) Eintracht Frankfurt	Bordeaux
	Lucas 49'; Dutuel 61'; Zidane 83'			Stadium: Stade du Parc Lescure; Attendance: 11,000; Referee: Léon Schelings (Belgium)

==== Quarter-finals ====
2 August 1995 Quarter-finals	Bordeaux (France)	2–0	(Netherlands) SC Heerenveen	Bordeaux
	Dutuel 51'; Lizarazu 70'			Stadium: Stade du Parc Lescure; Attendance: 12,830; Referee: Günter Benkö (Austria)

==== Semi-finals ====
8 August 1995 Semi-finals; First leg	Karlsruher SC (Germany)	0–2	(France) Bordeaux	Karlsruhe, Germany
20:30		Report	Dugarry 41'; Dutuel 88'	Stadium: Wildparkstadion; Attendance: 16,000; Referee: Antonio Jesús López Nieto (Spain)

22 August 1995 Semi-finals; Second leg	Bordeaux (France)	2–2 (4–2 agg.)	(Germany) Karlsruher SC	Bordeaux
20:30	Lizarazu 2' (pen.), 10'	Report	Fink 40'; Schmitt 87'	Stadium: Stade du Parc Lescure; Attendance: 20,000; Referee: Pierluigi Pairetto (Italy)

=== UEFA Cup ===
17 October 1995 Second round first leg	Bordeaux (France)	2–1	(Russia) Rotor Volgograd	Bordeaux
	Histilloles 47'; Witschge 90' (pen.)	Report	Niederhaus 40'

31 October 1995 Second round second leg	Rotor Volgograd (Russia)	0–1 (1–3 agg.)	(France) Bordeaux	Volgograd
		Report	Bancarel 83'

21 November 1995 Third round first leg	Bordeaux (France)	2–0	(Spain) Real Betis	Bordeaux
	Dutuel 23'; Croci 83'	Report

6 December 1995 Third round second leg	Real Betis (Spain)	2–1 (2–3 agg.)	(France) Bordeaux	Seville
	Trujillo 30'; Stošić 45'	Report	Zidane 3'

5 March 1996 Quarter-finals first leg	Milan (Italy)	2–0	(France) Bordeaux	San Siro, Milan
20:45	Eranio 29'; Baggio 75'	Report		Attendance: 22,740; Referee: Vadim Zhuk (Belarus)

19 March 1996 Quarter-finals second leg	Bordeaux (France)	3–0 (3–2 agg.)	(Italy) Milan	Stade du Parc Lescure, Bordeaux
20:30	Tholot 14'; Dugarry 63', 69'	Report		Attendance: 32,500; Referee: Ahmet Çakar (Turkey)

2 April 1996 Semi-finals first leg	Slavia Prague (Czech Republic)	0–1	(France) Bordeaux	Stadion Evžena Rošického, Prague
20:30		Report	Dugarry 9'	Attendance: 17,523; Referee: Mario van der Ende (Netherlands)

16 April 1996 Semi-finals second leg	Bordeaux (France)	1–0 (2–0 agg.)	(Czech Republic) Slavia Prague	Stade du Parc Lescure, Bordeaux
20:30	Tholot 46'	Report		Attendance: 31,500; Referee: Vassilios Nikakis (Greece)

==== Final ====
1 May 1996 First leg	Bayern Munich (Germany)	2–0	(France) Bordeaux	Olympiastadion, Munich
20:00	Helmer 34'; Scholl 60'	Report		Attendance: 63,000; Referee: Serge Muhmenthaler (Switzerland)

15 May 1996 Second leg	Bordeaux (France)	1–3 (1–5 agg.)	(Germany) Bayern Munich	Stade du Parc Lescure, Bordeaux
20:45	Dutuel 75'	Report	Scholl 53'; Kostadinov 65'; Klinsmann 77'	Attendance: 36,000; Referee: Vadim Zhuk (Belarus)

== Statistics ==
=== Appearances and goals ===
As of 18 May 1996

No.	Pos	Nat	Player	Total		Ligue 1		Coupe de France		Coupe de la Ligue		Intertoto		UEFA Cup	
No.	Pos	Nat	Player	Apps	Goals	Apps	Goals	Apps	Goals	Apps	Goals	Apps	Goals	Apps	Goals
Goalkeepers
	GK	(France) FRA	Gaëtan Huard	58	0	35	0	2	0	1	0	8	0	12	0
	GK	(France) FRA	Franck Fontan	4	0	3+1	0	0	0	0	0	0	0	0	0
Defenders
	DF	(France) FRA	Jean-Luc Dogon	57	3	35	3	1	0	1	0	8	0	12	0
	DF	(France) FRA	Laurent Croci	47	1	26+3	0	0	0	0	0	6+2	0	8+2	1
	DF	(France) FRA	Bixente Lizarazu	40	8	23	3	0	0	0	0	7	4	10	1
	DF	(France) FRA	Geoffray Toyes	38	0	23+2	0	2	0	1	0	1	0	7+2	0
	DF	(Denmark) DEN	Jakob Friis-Hansen	25	3	18	2	0	0	1	1	0	0	6	0
	DF	(France) FRA	William Prunier	30	2	17	0	0	0	0	0	8	2	5	0
	DF	(France) FRA	François Grenet	38	1	13+11	1	2	0	1	0	1	0	5+5	0
	DF	(France) FRA	Yannick Fischer	28	1	13+6	1	2	0	0	0	2+1	0	4	0
	DF	(Senegal) SEN	Joachim Fernandez	9	0	4+1	0	0	0	1	0	0	0	1+2	0
	DF	(France) FRA	Kodjo Afanou	1	0	1	0	0	0	0	0	0	0	0	0
	DF	(France) FRA	Pascal Philippe	1	0	0	0	0+1	0	0	0	0	0	0	0
Midfielders
	MF	(Netherlands) NED	Richard Witschge	54	10	33	7	2	2	0	0	6+1	0	12	1
	MF	(France) FRA	Zinedine Zidane	51	12	31+2	6	2	0	1	0	7	5	8	1
	MF	(France) FRA	Daniel Dutuel	51	9	29+3	4	2	0	0	0	7	3	7+3	2
	MF	(France) FRA	Philippe Lucas	50	1	27+1	0	1+1	0	1	0	7+1	1	11	0
	MF	(France) FRA	Franck Histilloles	26	2	9+8	0	1+1	1	0+1	0	1+2	0	2+1	1
	MF	(France) FRA	Régis Castant	16	2	5+7	1	1	1	1	0	1	0	0+1	0
	MF	(France) FRA	Jean-Yves de Blasiis	28	0	4+13	0	1+1	0	1	0	2+4	0	1+1	0
	MF	(France) FRA	Cédric Anselin	6	0	1+2	0	1	0	0	0	0	0	0+2	0
	MF	(France) FRA	Patrick Amrane	1	0	0+1	0	0	0	0	0	0	0	0	0
	MF	(France) FRA	Raphael Camacho	1	0	0+1	0	0	0	0	0	0	0	0	0
Forwards
	FW	(France) FRA	Anthony Bancarel	51	11	22+10	7	1	0	1	0	2+4	1	10+1	3
	FW	(France) FRA	Christophe Dugarry	37	9	22+2	4	0	0	0	0	7	2	6	3
	FW	(France) FRA	Didier Tholot	35	13	17+3	5	1+1	2	0	0	6+2	4	4+1	2
	FW	(Guinea) GUI	Kaba Diawara	2	1	1	1	0+1	0	0	0	0	0	0	0
	FW	(France) FRA	Jérôme Geffroy	2	0	0+1	0	0	0	0+1	0	0	0	0	0
Players loaned or transferred out during the season
	DF	(Bosnia and Herzegovina) BIH	Mirza Varešanović	17	0	6+6	0	0	0	0+1	0	0+3	0	1	0
	MF	(France) FRA	Laurent Fournier	1	0	0	0	0	0	0	0	1	0	0	0
