= 1996 UEFA Cup final =

- Event: 1995–96 UEFA Cup
Bayern Munich	Bordeaux
(Germany)	(France)
5	1
- on aggregate

First leg
Bayern Munich	Bordeaux
2	0
- Date: 1 May 1996
- Venue: Olympiastadion, Munich
- Referee: Serge Muhmenthaler (Switzerland)
- Attendance: 63,000

Second leg
Bordeaux	Bayern Munich
1	3
- Date: 15 May 1996
- Venue: Stade du Parc Lescure, Bordeaux
- Referee: Vadim Zhuk (Belarus)
- Attendance: 36,000

The 1996 UEFA Cup final was a two-legged association football match contested by Bayern Munich of Germany and Bordeaux of France to determine the winner of the 1995–96 UEFA Cup. This was the only UEFA Cup final during the 1990s to not feature any Italian sides and Bordeaux—in its only ever European final as of 2026—became the only team in the competition's history to reach the final from qualifying through the UEFA Intertoto Cup.

The first leg was played at the Olympiastadion in Munich on 1 May 1996, and the second leg was played two weeks later at Parc Lescure in Bordeaux. Bayern won the first leg 2–0 and the second leg 3–1 to record a 5–1 aggregate victory. With this victory, Bayern became the third club to have won all three major European trophies at the time (European Cup/UEFA Champions League, UEFA Cup/UEFA Europa League, and the Cup Winners' Cup).

== Route to the final ==
Bayern Munich				Bordeaux
Opponent	Result	Legs	Round	Opponent	Result	Legs
(Russia) Lokomotiv Moscow	5–1	0–1 home; 5–0 away	First round	(North Macedonia) Vardar	3–1	2–0 away; 1–1 home
(Scotland) Raith Rovers	4–1	2–0 away; 2–1 home	Second round	(Russia) Rotor Volgograd	3–1	2–1 home; 1–0 away
(Portugal) Benfica	7–2	4–1 home; 3–1 away	Third round	(Spain) Real Betis	3–2	2–0 home; 1–2 away
(England) Nottingham Forest	7–2	2–1 home; 5–1 away	Quarter-finals	(Italy) Milan	3–2	0–2 away; 3–0 home
(Spain) Barcelona	4–3	2–2 home; 2–1 away	Semi-finals	(Czech Republic) Slavia Prague	2–0	1–0 away; 1–0 home

== Match details ==
=== First leg ===
1 May 1996
20:00 CEST

Bayern Munich (Germany)	2–0	(France) Bordeaux
Helmer 34'; Scholl 60'	Report; Overview

Olympiastadion, Munich
Attendance: 63,000
Referee: Serge Muhmenthaler (Switzerland)

Bayern Munich	Bordeaux

GK	1	(Germany) Oliver Kahn
SW	10	(Germany) Lothar Matthäus (c)		(substituted off) 54'
CB	4	(Germany) Oliver Kreuzer
CB	5	(Germany) Thomas Helmer
RWB	2	(Germany) Markus Babbel
LWB	3	(Germany) Christian Ziege
CM	6	(Germany) Dietmar Hamann
CM	8	(Switzerland) Ciriaco Sforza
AM	7	(Germany) Mehmet Scholl
CF	9	(Germany) Jürgen Klinsmann
CF	11	(France) Jean-Pierre Papin	(yellow card) 29'	(substituted off) 70'
Substitutes:
GK	12	(Germany) Michael Probst
MF	13	(Austria) Andi Herzog
MF	14	(Germany) Christian Nerlinger
MF	15	(Germany) Dieter Frey		(substituted on) 54'
FW	16	(Germany) Marcel Witeczek		(substituted on) 70'
Manager:
(Germany) Franz Beckenbauer

GK	1	(France) Gaëtan Huard
RB	2	(France) François Grenet
CB	4	(Denmark) Jakob Friis-Hansen
CB	5	(France) Jean-Luc Dogon	(yellow card) 16'
LB	3	(France) Bixente Lizarazu (c)
RM	7	(France) Laurent Croci	(yellow card) 46'
CM	6	(France) Philippe Lucas	(yellow card) 5'
CM	8	(France) Daniel Dutuel
LM	10	(Netherlands) Richard Witschge	(yellow card) 76'
CF	11	(France) Anthony Bancarel
CF	9	(France) Didier Tholot		(substituted off) 90'
Substitutes:
GK	16	(France) Franck Fontan
DF	12	(France) Yannick Fischer
MF	13	(Senegal) Joachim Fernandez
MF	14	(France) Régis Castant
MF	15	(France) Cédric Anselin		(substituted on) 90'
Manager:
(Germany) Gernot Rohr

Assistant referees:
Ernst Felder (Switzerland)
Martin Freiburghaus (Switzerland)
Fourth official:
Urs Meier (Switzerland)

Match rules

- 90 minutes.
- Five named substitutes.
- Maximum of three substitutions.

=== Second leg ===
15 May 1996
20:45 CEST

Bordeaux (France)	1–3	(Germany) Bayern Munich
Dutuel 75'	Report; Overview	Scholl 53'; Kostadinov 66'; Klinsmann 77'

Stade du Parc Lescure, Bordeaux
Attendance: 36,000
Referee: Vadim Zhuk (Belarus)

Bordeaux	Bayern Munich

GK	1	(France) Gaëtan Huard
RB	2	(France) Anthony Bancarel
CB	4	(Denmark) Jakob Friis-Hansen
CB	5	(France) Jean-Luc Dogon
LB	3	(France) Bixente Lizarazu (c)		(substituted off) 31'
RM	8	(France) Laurent Croci	(yellow card) 35'	(substituted off) 57'
CM	6	(France) Philippe Lucas		(substituted off) 81'
CM	7	(France) Zinedine Zidane
LM	10	(Netherlands) Richard Witschge	(yellow card) 30'
CF	9	(France) Didier Tholot	(yellow card) 80'
CF	11	(France) Christophe Dugarry	(yellow card) 70'
Substitutes:
GK	16	(France) Franck Fontan
DF	15	(France) François Grenet		(substituted on) 81'
MF	12	(France) Cédric Anselin		(substituted on) 31'
MF	13	(Senegal) Joachim Fernandez
MF	14	(France) Daniel Dutuel		(substituted on) 57'
Manager:
(Germany) Gernot Rohr

GK	1	(Germany) Oliver Kahn
SW	10	(Germany) Lothar Matthäus (c)
CB	2	(Germany) Markus Babbel	(yellow card) 80'
CB	5	(Germany) Thomas Helmer	(yellow card) 42'
RWB	4	(Germany) Thomas Strunz
LWB	3	(Germany) Christian Ziege
CM	6	(Germany) Dieter Frey	(yellow card) 57'	(substituted off) 60'
CM	8	(Switzerland) Ciriaco Sforza
AM	7	(Germany) Mehmet Scholl
CF	9	(Germany) Jürgen Klinsmann
CF	11	(Bulgaria) Emil Kostadinov		(substituted off) 75'
Substitutes:
GK	12	(Germany) Michael Probst
MF	13	(Austria) Andi Herzog
MF	14	(Germany) Christian Nerlinger
FW	15	(Germany) Marcel Witeczek		(substituted on) 75'
FW	16	(Germany) Alexander Zickler		(substituted on) 60'
Manager:
(Germany) Franz Beckenbauer

Assistant referees:
Yuri Dupanov (Belarus)
Aleh Chykun (Belarus)
Fourth official:
Kazimir Znaydinsky (Belarus)

Match rules

- 90 minutes.
- 30 minutes of golden goal extra time if necessary.
- Penalty shoot-out if scores still level.
- Five named substitutes.
- Maximum of three substitutions.

== See also ==
- 1996 UEFA Champions League final
- 1996 UEFA Cup Winners' Cup final
- FC Bayern Munich in international football
- FC Girondins de Bordeaux in European football
- 1995–96 FC Bayern Munich season
- 1995–96 FC Girondins de Bordeaux season
