= 1996 Coupe de la Ligue final =

- Event: 1995–96 Coupe de la Ligue
Lyon	Metz
Division 1	Division 1
0	0
- After extra time Metz won 5–4 on penalties
- Date: 6 April 1996
- Venue: Parc des Princes, Paris
- Referee: Marc Batta
- Attendance: 45,368

The 1996 Coupe de la Ligue final was a football match held at Parc des Princes, Paris on April 6, 1996, that saw FC Metz defeat Olympique Lyonnais in a penalty shootout

== Route to the final ==
Note: In all results below, the score of the finalist is given first (H: home; A: away).

Lyon		Round	Metz	
Opponent	Result	1995–96 Coupe de la Ligue	Opponent	Result
Dunkerque (H)	3–1	Second round	Angers (A)	3–0
Lille (H)	2–0	Round of 16	Amiens (H)	3–1
Niort (A)	2–0	Quarter-finals	Monaco (H)	1–0
Guingamp (A)	2–1	Semi-finals	Cannes (H)	1–0

== Match details ==
6 April 1996
17:00

Lyon	0–0	Metz
Penalties
Roche (penalty missed); Assadourian (penalty scored); Maurice (penalty scored); Roy (penalty scored); Olmeta (penalty scored); Marcelo (penalty missed)	4–5	(penalty missed) Kastendeuch; (penalty scored) Gaillot; (penalty scored) Isaias; (penalty scored) Pires; (penalty scored) Adam; (penalty scored) Pouget

Parc des Princes, Paris
Attendance: 45,368
Referee: Marc Batta

OLYMPIQUE LYONNAIS:
GK	1	(France) Pascal Olmeta
DF	2	(France) Ghislain Anselmini
DF	3	(Poland) Jacek Bąk
DF	4	(Brazil) Marcelo
DF	5	(France) Jean-Luc Sassus
DF	6	(France) Florent Laville
MF	7	(France) Stéphane Roche
MF	8	(France) Eric Roy
MF	9	(France) Sylvain Deplace
FW	10	(France) Ludovic Giuly	(substituted off) 116'
FW	11	(France) Florian Maurice
Substitutes:
FW	16	(Armenia) Éric Assadourian	(substituted on) 116'
Manager:
(France) Guy Stéphan Assistant Referees: Fourth Official:

FC METZ:
GK	1	(Cameroon) Jacques Songo'o
DF	2	(France) Philippe Gaillot
DF	3	(France) Sylvain Kastendeuch (c)
DF	4	(France) Pascal Pierre
DF	5	(Cameroon) Rigobert Song
MF	6	(France) Frédéric Arpinon	(substituted off) 106'
MF	7	(France) Jocelyn Blanchard
MF	8	(France) Cyril Serredszum
MF	11	(France) Robert Pires
FW	9	(Cameroon) Patrick M'Boma	(substituted off) 35'
FW	10	(France) Cyrille Pouget
Substitutes:
FW	12	(France) Stéphane Adam	(substituted on) 35'
FW	14	(Brazil) Isaias	(substituted on) 106'
Manager:
(France) Joël Müller

== See also ==
- 1996 Coupe de France final
