= 1995–96 AS Saint-Étienne season =

AS Saint-Étienne
1995–96 season
- President: Michel Vernassa
- Head coach: Élie Baup (until February); Maxime Bossis (interim); Dominique Bathenay (from February)
- Stadium: Stade Geoffroy-Guichard
- French Division 1: 19th (relegated)
- Coupe de France: Round of 32
- Coupe de la Ligue: Round of 16
- Top goalscorer: League: Liazid Sandjak (8); All: Didier Thimothée (10)
- Biggest win: Saint-Étienne 5–0 US Saintes
- Biggest defeat: Saint-Étienne 0–5 Auxerre

The 1995–96 AS Saint-Étienne season was the club's 63rd season in existence and the 10th consecutive season in the top flight of French football. In addition to the domestic league, Saint-Étienne participated in this season's editions of the Coupe de France and the Coupe de la Ligue. The season covered the period from 1 July 1995 to 30 June 1996.

== Pre-season and friendlies ==
Win Draw Loss Fixtures

| 22 August 1995 Friendly | Saint-Étienne (France) | 2–1 | (Italy) Milan | Saint-Étienne, France |
| --:-- CEST (UTC+2) | | | | Stadium: Stade Geoffroy-Guichard |

| 21 April 1996 Friendly | Martigues (France) | 2–0 | (France) Saint-Étienne |
| --:-- CEST (UTC+2) |

== Competitions ==
=== Overview ===
| Competition | First match | Last match | Starting round | Final position | Record | | | | | | | |
| Competition | First match | Last match | Starting round | Final position | Pld | W | D | L | GF | GA | GD | Win % |
|---|---|---|---|---|---|---|---|---|---|---|---|---|
| French Division 1 | 19 July 1995 | 18 May 1996 | Matchday 1 | 19th | 38 | 6 | 16 | 16 | 36 | 59 | −23 | 15.79 |
| Coupe de France | 13 January 1996 | 3 February 1996 | Round of 64 | Round of 32 | 2 | 1 | 0 | 1 | 6 | 3 | +3 | 50.00 |
| Coupe de la Ligue | 13 December 1995 | 6 January 1996 | Round of 32 | Round of 16 | 2 | 0 | 1 | 1 | 1 | 3 | −2 | 0.00 |
| Total | | | | | 42 | 7 | 17 | 18 | 43 | 65 | −22 | 16.67 |

Last updated: August 2020
Source: Competitions

=== French Division 1 ===
==== League table ====
| Pos | Team | Pld | W | D | L | GF | GA | GD | Pts | Qualification or relegation |
|---|---|---|---|---|---|---|---|---|---|---|
| 16 | Bordeaux | 38 | 11 | 9 | 18 | 44 | 52 | −8 | 42 | |
| 17 | Lille | 38 | 9 | 12 | 17 | 27 | 50 | −23 | 39 | |
| 18 | Gueugnon (R) | 38 | 8 | 14 | 16 | 27 | 46 | −19 | 38 | Relegation to French Division 2 |
| 19 | Saint-Étienne (R) | 38 | 6 | 16 | 16 | 36 | 59 | −23 | 34 | Relegation to French Division 2 |
| 20 | Martigues (R) | 38 | 9 | 7 | 22 | 31 | 58 | −27 | 34 | Relegation to French Division 2 |

Source: Ligue 1
Rules for classification: 1) points; 2) goal difference; 3) number of goals scored.
(R) Relegated

==== Results summary ====
| Overall | | | | | | | | Home | | | | | | Away | | | | | |
| Pld | W | D | L | GF | GA | GD | Pts | W | D | L | GF | GA | GD | W | D | L | GF | GA | GD |
|---|---|---|---|---|---|---|---|---|---|---|---|---|---|---|---|---|---|---|---|
| 38 | 6 | 16 | 16 | 36 | 59 | −23 | 34 | 5 | 11 | 3 | 26 | 22 | +4 | 1 | 5 | 13 | 10 | 37 | −27 |

Last updated: August 2020.

==== Results by round ====
| Round | 1 | 2 | 3 | 4 | 5 | 6 | 7 | 8 | 9 | 10 | 11 | 12 | 13 | 14 | 15 | 16 | 17 | 18 | 19 | 20 | 21 | 22 | 23 | 24 | 25 | 26 | 27 | 28 | 29 | 30 | 31 | 32 | 33 | 34 | 35 | 36 | 37 | 38 |
|---|---|---|---|---|---|---|---|---|---|---|---|---|---|---|---|---|---|---|---|---|---|---|---|---|---|---|---|---|---|---|---|---|---|---|---|---|---|---|
| Ground | H | A | H | A | H | H | A | H | A | H | A | H | A | H | A | H | A | H | A | H | A | H | A | A | H | A | H | A | H | A | H | A | H | A | H | A | H | A |
| Result | D | L | D | L | W | W | D | W | L | L | L | L | D | D | L | D | W | L | D | W | D | D | D | L | D | L | D | L | D | L | D | L | W | L | D | L | D | L |
| Position | 11 | 16 | 17 | 18 | 15 | 11 | 11 | 10 | 11 | 13 | 15 | 16 | 16 | 16 | 16 | 16 | 15 | 16 | 16 | 15 | 15 | 15 | 15 | 16 | 16 | 16 | 17 | 18 | 18 | 18 | 18 | 18 | 17 | 17 | 17 | 18 | 19 | 19 |

A = Away; H = Home; W = Win; D = Draw; L = Loss

==== Matches ====
| 19 July 1995 1 | Saint-Étienne | 1–1 | Nice | Saint-Étienne |
| 20:00 CEST (UTC+2) | | | | Stadium: Stade Geoffroy-Guichard |

| 26 July 1995 2 | Bordeaux | 2–0 | Saint-Étienne | Bordeaux |
| 20:00 CEST (UTC+2) |

| 5 August 1995 3 | Saint-Étienne | 1–1 | Lille | Saint-Étienne |
| 20:00 CEST (UTC+2) | | | | Stadium: Stade Geoffroy-Guichard |

| 9 August 1995 4 | Paris Saint-Germain | 4–0 | Saint-Étienne | Paris |
| 20:00 CEST (UTC+2) |

| 19 August 1995 5 | Saint-Étienne | 3–0 | Bastia | Saint-Étienne |
| 20:00 CEST (UTC+2) | | | | Stadium: Stade Geoffroy-Guichard |

| 26 August 1995 6 | Saint-Étienne | 4–0 | Guingamp | Saint-Étienne |
| 20:00 CEST (UTC+2) | | | | Stadium: Stade Geoffroy-Guichard |

| 29 August 1995 7 | Nantes | 2–2 | Saint-Étienne | Nantes |
| 20:00 CEST (UTC+2) |

| 9 September 1995 8 | Saint-Étienne | 2–0 | Gueugnon | Saint-Étienne |
| 20:00 CEST (UTC+2) | | | | Stadium: Stade Geoffroy-Guichard |

| 16 September 1995 9 | Cannes | 2–0 | Saint-Étienne | Cannes |
| 20:00 CEST (UTC+2) |

| 21 September 1995 10 | Saint-Étienne | 2–4 | Monaco | Saint-Étienne |
| 20:30 CEST (UTC+2) | | | | Stadium: Stade Geoffroy-Guichard |

| 30 September 1995 11 | Lyon | 2–1 | Saint-Étienne | Lyon |
| 20:00 CEST (UTC+2) |

| 4 October 1995 12 | Saint-Étienne | 0–2 | Montpellier | Saint-Étienne |
| 20:00 CEST (UTC+2) | | | | Stadium: Stade Geoffroy-Guichard |

| 15 October 1995 13 | Le Havre | 2–2 | Saint-Étienne | Le Havre |
| 20:30 CEST (UTC+2) |

| 21 October 1995 14 | Saint-Étienne | 1–1 | Lens | Saint-Étienne |
| 20:00 CEST (UTC+2) | | | | Stadium: Stade Geoffroy-Guichard |

| 27 October 1995 15 | Strasbourg | 3–1 | Saint-Étienne | Strasbourg |
| 20:00 CEST (UTC+2) |

| 4 November 1995 16 | Saint-Étienne | 0–0 | Rennes | Saint-Étienne |
| 20:00 CET (UTC+1) | | | | Stadium: Stade Geoffroy-Guichard |

| 8 November 1995 17 | Metz | 1–2 | Saint-Étienne | Metz |
| 20:00 CET (UTC+1) |

| 19 November 1995 18 | Saint-Étienne | 0–5 | Auxerre | Saint-Étienne |
| 20:30 CET (UTC+1) | | | | Stadium: Stade Geoffroy-Guichard |

| 25 November 1995 19 | Martigues | 1–1 | Saint-Étienne | Martigues |
| 20:00 CET (UTC+1) |

| 1 December 1995 20 | Saint-Étienne | 2–0 | Bordeaux | Saint-Étienne |
| 20:00 CET (UTC+1) | | | | Stadium: Stade Geoffroy-Guichard |

| 9 December 1995 21 | Lille | 1–1 | Saint-Étienne | Lille |
| 20:00 CET (UTC+1) |

| 16 December 1995 22 | Saint-Étienne | 1–1 | Paris Saint-Germain | Saint-Étienne |
| 20:00 CET (UTC+1) | | | | Stadium: Stade Geoffroy-Guichard |

| 10 January 1996 23 | Bastia | 0–0 | Saint-Étienne | Furiani |
| 20:00 CET (UTC+1) |

| 20 January 1996 24 | Guingamp | 3–0 | Saint-Étienne | Guingamp |
| 20:00 CET (UTC+1) |

| 28 January 1996 25 | Saint-Étienne | 0–0 | Nantes | Saint-Étienne |
| 20:30 CET (UTC+1) | | | | Stadium: Stade Geoffroy-Guichard |

| 17 February 1996 28 | Monaco | 2–0 | Saint-Étienne | Monaco |
| 20:00 CET (UTC+1) |

| 23 February 1996 26 | Gueugnon | 1–0 | Saint-Étienne | Gueugnon |
| 20:00 CET (UTC+1) |

| 27 February 1996 29 | Saint-Étienne | 1–1 | Lyon | Saint-Étienne |
| 20:00 CET (UTC+1) | | | | Stadium: Stade Geoffroy-Guichard |

| 2 March 1996 30 | Montpellier | 1–0 | Saint-Étienne | Montpellier |
| 20:00 CET (UTC+1) |

| 9 March 1996 31 | Saint-Étienne | 1–1 | Le Havre | Saint-Étienne |
| 20:00 CET (UTC+1) | | | | Stadium: Stade Geoffroy-Guichard |

| 16 March 1996 27 | Saint-Étienne | 2–2 | Cannes | Saint-Étienne |
| 20:00 CET (UTC+1) | | | | Stadium: Stade Geoffroy-Guichard |

| 23 March 1996 32 | Lens | 3–0 | Saint-Étienne | Lens |
| 20:00 CET (UTC+1) |

| 30 March 1996 33 | Saint-Étienne | 2–0 | Strasbourg | Saint-Étienne |
| 20:00 CET (UTC+1) | | | | Stadium: Stade Geoffroy-Guichard |

| 9 April 1996 34 | Rennes | 3–0 | Saint-Étienne | Rennes |
| 20:00 CEST (UTC+2) |

| 20 April 1996 35 | Saint-Étienne | 1–1 | Metz | Saint-Étienne |
| 20:00 CEST (UTC+2) | | | | Stadium: Stade Geoffroy-Guichard |

| 26 April 1996 36 | Auxerre | 3–0 | Saint-Étienne | Auxerre |
| 20:30 CEST (UTC+2) |

| 11 May 1996 37 | Saint-Étienne | 2–2 | Martigues | Saint-Étienne |
| 20:00 CEST (UTC+2) | | | | Stadium: Stade Geoffroy-Guichard |

| 18 May 1996 38 | Nice | 2–0 | Saint-Étienne | Nice |
| 20:00 CEST (UTC+2) |

=== Coupe de France ===
| 13 January 1996 Round of 64 | Saint-Étienne | 5–0 | US Saintes | Saint-Étienne |
| 18:00 CET (UTC+1) | | | | Stadium: Stade Geoffroy-Guichard; Attendance: 3,275; Referee: Claude Tellène |

| 3 February 1996 Round of 32 | Nîmes | 3–1 | Saint-Étienne | Nîmes |
| 20:00 CET (UTC+1) | | | | Stadium: Stade des Costières; Attendance: 5,262; Referee: Claude Colombo |

=== Coupe de la Ligue ===
| 13 December 1995 Round of 32 | Bordeaux | 1–1 (a.e.t.) (4–5 p) | Saint-Étienne | Bordeaux |
| 20:00 CET (UTC+1) | Friis-Hansen 4' | | Thimothée 45'; Moravčík (penalty missed) 70' | Stadium: Stade du Parc Lescure; Attendance: 3,110; Referee: Philippe Kalt |

| 6 January 1996 Round of 16 | Marseille | 2–0 | Saint-Étienne | Marseille |
| 17:00 CET (UTC+1) | | | | Stadium: Stade Vélodrome; Attendance: 20,000; Referee: Alain Sars |
