= 1999–2000 US Créteil-Lusitanos season =

US Créteil-Lusitanos
1999–2000 season
- Chairman: Alain Afflelou
- Manager: Gernot Rohr
- Stadium: Stade Dominique Duvauchelle
- French Division 2: 17th
- Coupe de France: Round of 64
- Coupe de la Ligue: Round of 32
- Biggest win: Guingamp 0–2 Créteil; Créteil 2–0 Amiens; Créteil 2–0 Laval; Créteil 3–1 Toulouse; Créteil 2–0 Beauvais
- Biggest defeat: Lille 5–0 Créteil

The 1999–2000 season was US Créteil-Lusitanos's 64th season in existence and the club's first season back in the second division of French football since 1993. In addition to the domestic league, Créteil participated in this season's editions of the Coupe de France and the Coupe de la Ligue. The season covered the period from 1 July 1999 to 30 June 2000.

== Pre-season and friendlies ==
Win Draw Loss

11 February 2000 Friendly	Créteil (France)	0–1	(France) Lens	Créteil, France
19:00 CET (UTC+1)			Nouma 63'	Stadium: Stade Dominique Duvauchelle

== Competitions ==
=== Overview ===
Competition	First match	Last match	Starting round	Final position	Record							
Competition	First match	Last match	Starting round	Final position	Pld	W	D	L	GF	GA	GD	Win %
French Division 2	31 July 1999	13 May 2000	Matchday 1	17th	38	11	11	16	36	52	−16	28.95
Coupe de France	27 November 1999	21 January 2000	Seventh round	Round of 64	3	1	1	1	3	2	+1	33.33
Coupe de la Ligue	16 November 1999	8 January 2000	First round	Round of 32	2	0	1	1	3	4	−1	0.00
Total					43	12	13	18	42	58	−16	27.91

Source: Competitions

=== French Division 1 ===
==== League table ====
Pos	Team	Pld	W	D	L	GF	GA	GD	Pts	Promotion or Relegation
15	Niort	38	10	15	13	42	49	−7	45	
16	Wasquehal	38	9	17	12	33	39	−6	44	
17	Créteil	38	11	11	16	36	52	−16	44	
18	Amiens (R)	38	7	16	15	30	43	−13	37	Relegation to Championnat National [fr]
19	Valence (R)	38	6	15	17	37	54	−17	33	Relegation to Championnat National [fr]

Source: Ligue 2
(R) Relegated

==== Results summary ====
Overall								Home						Away					
Pld	W	D	L	GF	GA	GD	Pts	W	D	L	GF	GA	GD	W	D	L	GF	GA	GD
38	11	11	16	36	52	−16	44	8	7	4	24	20	+4	3	4	12	12	32	−20

==== Results by round ====
Round	1	2	3	4	5	6	7	8	9	10	11	12	13	14	15	16	17	18	19	20	21	22	23	24	25	26	27	28	29	30	31	32	33	34	35	36	37	38
Ground	H	A	H	A	H	A	H	A	H	A	H	A	H	A	H	A	H	A	H	H	A	H	A	H	A	H	A	H	A	H	A	H	A	H	A	H	A	A
Result	D	W	D	L	W	L	D	L	W	L	L	D	L	W	D	D	W	L	W	L	L	W	D	W	L	D	L	D	L	L	L	W	L	W	L	D	D	W
Position	10	3	6	11	7	8	8	13	9	10	12	15	16	13	13	13	12	15	12	14	15	13	14	10	12	13	14	14	16	17	17	16	17	17	17	17	17	17

A = Away; H = Home; W = Win; D = Draw; L = Loss

==== Matches ====
31 July 1999 1	Créteil	1–1	Niort	Créteil
--:-- CEST (UTC+2)				Stadium: Stade Dominique Duvauchelle

7 August 1999 2	Guingamp	0–2	Créteil	Guingamp
--:-- CEST (UTC+2)				Stadium: Stade de Roudourou

13 August 1999 3	Créteil	1–1	Le Mans	Créteil
--:-- CEST (UTC+2)				Stadium: Stade Dominique Duvauchelle

17 August 1999 4	Laval	1–0	Créteil	Laval
--:-- CEST (UTC+2)				Stadium: Stade Francis Le Basser

21 August 1999 5	Créteil	2–1	Caen	Créteil
--:-- CEST (UTC+2)				Stadium: Stade Dominique Duvauchelle

27 August 1999 6	Nîmes	2–1	Créteil	Nîmes
--:-- CEST (UTC+2)				Stadium: Stade des Costières

3 September 1999 7	Créteil	1–1	Cannes	Créteil
--:-- CEST (UTC+2)				Stadium: Stade Dominique Duvauchelle

7 September 1999 8	Nice	2–0	Créteil	Nice
--:-- CEST (UTC+2)				Stadium: Stade du Ray

11 September 1999 8	Créteil	2–1	Valence	Créteil
--:-- CEST (UTC+2)				Stadium: Stade Dominique Duvauchelle

18 September 1999 10	Ajaccio	2–0	Créteil	Ajaccio
--:-- CEST (UTC+2)				Stadium: Stade François Coty

24 September 1999 11	Créteil	0–1	Lorient	Créteil
--:-- CEST (UTC+2)				Stadium: Stade Dominique Duvauchelle

1 October 1999 12	Châteauroux	0–0	Créteil	Châteauroux
--:-- CEST (UTC+2)				Stadium: Stade Gaston-Petit

8 October 1999 13	Créteil	1–4	Gueugnon	Créteil
20:00 CEST (UTC+2)	Huysman 34'		N'Diaye 17'; Traoré 43', 87'; Flauto 64'	Stadium: Stade Dominique Duvauchelle; Attendance: 1,880; Referee: Jean-Claude Puyalt

16 October 1999 14	Louhans-Cuiseaux	1–2	Créteil	Louhans
20:00 CEST (UTC+2)	Jäger 77'		Histilloles 21', 53'	Stadium: Stade du Bram; Attendance: 1,634; Referee: Fredy Fautrel

23 October 1999 15	Créteil	0–0	Sochaux	Créteil
20:00 CEST (UTC+2)				Stadium: Stade Dominique Duvauchelle; Attendance: 2,403; Referee: Pascal Vileo

30 October 1999 16	Toulouse	1–1	Créteil	Toulouse
20:00 CEST (UTC+2)	Ipoua 65'		Bancarel 71'	Stadium: Stadium de Toulouse; Attendance: 10,369; Referee: Michel Bonnichon

6 November 1999 17	Créteil	1–0	Lille	Créteil
20:00 CET (UTC+1)	Castro 84'			Stadium: Stade Dominique Duvauchelle; Attendance: 3,104; Referee: Bertrand Layec

9 November 1999 18	Wasquehal	1–0	Créteil	Villeneuve-d'Ascq
20:00 CET (UTC+1)	Bizasène 15'			Stadium: Stadium Lille Métropole; Attendance: 1,015; Referee: Régis Champet

12 November 1999 19	Créteil	2–0	Amiens	Créteil
--:-- CET (UTC+1)				Stadium: Stade Dominique Duvauchelle

20 November 1999 20	Créteil	1–3	Guingamp	Créteil
--:-- CET (UTC+1)				Stadium: Stade Dominique Duvauchelle

4 December 1999 21	Le Mans	2–0	Créteil	Le Mans
--:-- CET (UTC+1)				Stadium: Stade Léon-Bollée

11 December 1999 22	Créteil	2–0	Laval	Créteil
--:-- CET (UTC+1)				Stadium: Stade Dominique Duvauchelle

15 January 2000 23	Caen	1–1	Créteil	Caen
--:-- CET (UTC+1)				Stadium: Stade Michel d'Ornano

26 January 2000 24	Créteil	3–2	Nîmes	Créteil
--:-- CET (UTC+1)				Stadium: Stade Dominique Duvauchelle

2 February 2000 25	Cannes	1–0	Créteil	Cannes
--:-- CET (UTC+1)				Stadium: Stade Pierre de Coubertin

5 February 2000 26	Créteil	0–0	Nice	Créteil
--:-- CET (UTC+1)				Stadium: Stade Dominique Duvauchelle

16 February 2000 27	Valence	3–1	Créteil	Valence
--:-- CET (UTC+1)				Stadium: Stade Georges Pompidou

26 February 2000 28	Créteil	1–1	Ajaccio	Créteil
--:-- CET (UTC+1)				Stadium: Stade Dominique Duvauchelle

11 March 2000 29	Lorient	3–0	Créteil	Lorient
--:-- CET (UTC+1)				Stadium: Stade du Moustoir

24 March 2000 30	Créteil	0–1	Châteauroux	Créteil
--:-- CET (UTC+1)				Stadium: Stade Dominique Duvauchelle

28 March 2000 31	Gueugnon	1–0	Créteil	Gueugnon
--:-- CEST (UTC+2)				Stadium: Stade Jean Laville

8 April 2000 32	Créteil	2–1	Louhans-Cuiseaux	Créteil
--:-- CEST (UTC+2)				Stadium: Stade Dominique Duvauchelle

15 April 2000 33	Sochaux	5–1	Créteil	Montbéliard
--:-- CEST (UTC+2)				Stadium: Stade Auguste Bonal

21 April 2000 34	Créteil	3–1	Toulouse	Créteil
--:-- CEST (UTC+2)				Stadium: Stade Dominique Duvauchelle

29 April 2000 35	Lille	5–0	Créteil	Lille
--:-- CEST (UTC+2)				Stadium: Stade Grimonprez-Jooris

5 May 2000 36	Créteil	1–1	Wasquehal	Créteil
--:-- CEST (UTC+2)				Stadium: Stade Dominique Duvauchelle

12 May 2000 37	Amiens	0–0	Créteil	Amiens
--:-- CEST (UTC+2)				Stadium: Stade de la Licorne

20 May 2000 38	Niort	1–3	Créteil	Niort
--:-- CEST (UTC+2)				Stadium: Stade René Gaillard

=== Coupe de France ===
27 November 1999 Seventh round	ES Viry-Châtillon	1–1 (a.e.t.) (4–5 p)	Créteil
--:-- CET (UTC+1)

17 December 1999 Eighth round	Créteil	2–0	Beauvais	Créteil
--:-- CET (UTC+1)				Stadium: Stade Dominique Duvauchelle

21 January 2000 Round of 64	Gueugnon	1–0	Créteil	Gueugnon
20:00 CET (UTC+1)				Stadium: Stade Jean Laville

=== Coupe de la Ligue ===
16 November 1999 First round	Lorient	1–1 (a.e.t.) (1–4 p)	Créteil	Lorient
20:00 CET (UTC+1)	Gauvin 27'		Huysman 11'	Stadium: Stade du Moustoir; Attendance: 7,449; Referee: Franck Glochon

8 January 2000 Round of 32	Paris Saint-Germain	4–3	Créteil	Paris
20:00 CET (UTC+1)	Robert 19', 45' (pen.); Rabésandratana 64'; Cissé 69'	Report	Rabésandratana 32' (o.g.); Histilloles 13', 87'	Stadium: Parc des Princes; Attendance: 33,269; Referee: Stéphane Moulin
