= 1995–96 Olympique de Marseille season =

Olympique de Marseille
1995–96 season
- Presidents: Jean-Claude Gaudin; Jean-Michel Roussier
- Head coach: Gérard Gili
- Stadium: Stade Vélodrome
- French Division 2: 2nd (promoted)
- Coupe de France: Semi-finals
- Coupe de la Ligue: Quarter-finals
- Top goalscorer: League: Tony Cascarino (30); All: Tony Cascarino (30)
- Average home league attendance: 14,019
- Biggest win: Lempdes SF 1–8 Marseille

The 1995–96 season was Olympique de Marseille's 97th season in existence and the second consecutive season outside the top flight of French football. In addition to the domestic league, Marseille participated in this season's editions of the Coupe de France and the Coupe de la Ligue.

== Competitions ==
=== Overview ===
Competition	First match	Last match	Starting round	Final position	Record							
Competition	First match	Last match	Starting round	Final position	Pld	W	D	L	GF	GA	GD	Win %
French Division 2	19 July 1995	21 May 1996	Matchday 1	2nd	42	23	11	8	69	35	+34	54.76
Coupe de France	1 December 1995	13 April 1996	Seventh round	Semi-finals	7	6	1	0	20	3	+17	85.71
Coupe de la Ligue	24 October 1995	30 January 1996	First round	Quarter-finals	4	3	0	1	5	2	+3	75.00
Total					53	32	12	9	94	40	+54	60.38

Source: Competitions

=== French Division 2 ===
==== League table ====
Pos	Team	Pld	W	D	L	GF	GA	GD	Pts	Promotion or Relegation
1	Caen (C, P)	42	24	9	9	59	34	+25	81	Promotion to French Division 1
2	Marseille (P)	42	23	11	8	69	35	+34	80	Promotion to French Division 1
3	Nancy (P)	42	20	16	6	56	23	+33	76	Promotion to French Division 1
4	Laval	42	21	9	12	52	46	+6	72	
5	Toulouse	42	18	9	15	40	34	+6	63	

Source: Ligue 2
(C) Champions; (P) Promoted

==== Results summary ====
Overall								Home						Away					
Pld	W	D	L	GF	GA	GD	Pts	W	D	L	GF	GA	GD	W	D	L	GF	GA	GD
42	23	11	8	69	35	+34	80	16	5	0	48	9	+39	7	6	8	21	26	−5

Source: French Division 2

==== Results by round ====
Round	1	2	3	4	5	6	7	8	9	10	11	12	13	14	15	16	17	18	19	20	21	22	23	24	25	26	27	28	29	30	31	32	33	34	35	36	37	38	39	40	41	42
Ground	H	A	H	A	H	A	H	A	H	A	H	A	H	A	H	H	A	H	A	H	A	H	A	H	A	H	A	H	A	H	A	H	A	H	A	A	H	A	H	A	H	A
Result	W	L	D	L	W	W	D	L	D	L	W	D	D	L	W	W	D	W	W	W	L	W	D	W	W	W	W	W	D	W	W	W	W	W	D	L	W	D	D	L	W	W
Position	1	9	9	17	10	4	5	9	12	13	10	11	12	14	13	12	12	8	8	5	7	6	7	5	4	3	2	1	1	1	1	1	1	1	1	1	1	1	1	2	2	2

Source: French Division 2
A = Away; H = Home; W = Win; D = Draw; L = Loss

==== Matches ====
19 July 1995 1	Marseille	3–1	Le Mans	Marseille
--:-- CEST (UTC+2)				Stadium: Stade Vélodrome

26 July 1995 2	SAS Épinal	2–0	Marseille	Épinal
--:-- CEST (UTC+2)

29 July 1995 3	Marseille	0–0	Angers	Marseille
--:-- CEST (UTC+2)				Stadium: Stade Vélodrome

5 August 1995 4	Louhans-Cuiseaux FC	3–1	Marseille	Louhans
--:-- CEST (UTC+2)

9 August 1995 5	Marseille	2–0	Amiens	Marseille
--:-- CEST (UTC+2)				Stadium: Stade Vélodrome

12 August 1995 6	Perpignan FC	0–2	Marseille	Perpignan
--:-- CEST (UTC+2)

19 August 1995 7	Marseille	0–0	Dunkerque	Marseille
--:-- CEST (UTC+2)				Stadium: Stade Vélodrome

26 August 1995 8	Caen	2–0	Marseille	Caen
--:-- CEST (UTC+2)

31 August 1995 8	Marseille	1–1	Toulouse	Marseille
--:-- CEST (UTC+2)				Stadium: Stade Vélodrome

9 September 1995 10	Mulhouse	2–0	Marseille	Mulhouse
--:-- CEST (UTC+2)

16 September 1995 11	Marseille	5–0	Laval	Marseille
--:-- CEST (UTC+2)				Stadium: Stade Vélodrome

23 September 1995 12	Alès	0–0	Marseille	Alès
--:-- CEST (UTC+2)

30 September 1995 13	Marseille	1–1	Lorient	Marseille
--:-- CEST (UTC+2)				Stadium: Stade Vélodrome

5 October 1995 14	Nancy	2–0	Marseille	Tomblaine
--:-- CEST (UTC+2)

14 October 1995 15	Marseille	3–0	Stade Poitevin FC	Marseille
--:-- CEST (UTC+2)				Stadium: Stade Vélodrome

22 October 1995 16	Marseille	1–0	LB Châteauroux	Marseille
--:-- CEST (UTC+2)				Stadium: Stade Vélodrome

29 October 1995 17	Red Star	2–2	Marseille	Paris
--:-- CEST (UTC+2)

4 November 1995 18	Marseille	2–1	Niort	Marseille
--:-- CEST (UTC+2)				Stadium: Stade Vélodrome

10 November 1995 19	Valence	0–2	Marseille	Valence
--:-- CEST (UTC+2)

18 November 1995 20	Marseille	4–0	OFC Charleville	Marseille
--:-- CEST (UTC+2)				Stadium: Stade Vélodrome

24 November 1995 21	Sochaux	1–0	Marseille	Montbéliard
--:-- CEST (UTC+2)

9 December 1995 22	Marseille	3–0	SAS Épinal	Marseille
--:-- CEST (UTC+2)				Stadium: Stade Vélodrome

10 January 1996 23	Angers	1–1	Marseille	Angers
--:-- CEST (UTC+2)

20 January 1996 24	Marseille	2–0	Louhans-Cuiseaux FC	Marseille
--:-- CEST (UTC+2)				Stadium: Stade Vélodrome

27 January 1996 25	Amiens	1–2	Marseille	Amiens
--:-- CEST (UTC+2)

7 February 1996 26	Marseille	5–1	Perpignan FC	Marseille
--:-- CEST (UTC+2)				Stadium: Stade Vélodrome

10 February 1996 27	Dunkerque	1–2	Marseille	Dunkirk
--:-- CEST (UTC+2)

18 February 1996 28	Marseille	1–0	Caen	Marseille
--:-- CEST (UTC+2)				Stadium: Stade Vélodrome

27 February 1996 29	Toulouse	0–0	Marseille	Toulouse
--:-- CEST (UTC+2)

2 March 1996 30	Marseille	1–0	Mulhouse	Marseille
--:-- CEST (UTC+2)				Stadium: Stade Vélodrome

8 March 1996 31	Laval	1–3	Marseille	Laval
--:-- CEST (UTC+2)

13 March 1996 32	Marseille	4–0	Alès	Marseille
--:-- CEST (UTC+2)				Stadium: Stade Vélodrome

23 March 1996 33	Lorient	0–1	Marseille	Lorient
--:-- CEST (UTC+2)

30 March 1996 34	Marseille	2–0	Nancy	Marseille
--:-- CEST (UTC+2)				Stadium: Stade Vélodrome

9 April 1996 35	Stade Poitevin FC	0–0	Marseille	Poitevin
--:-- CEST (UTC+2)

19 April 1996 36	LB Châteauroux	4–2	Marseille	Châteauroux
--:-- CEST (UTC+2)

24 April 1996 37	Marseille	2–1	Red Star	Marseille
--:-- CEST (UTC+2)				Stadium: Stade Vélodrome

27 April 1996 38	Niort	0–0	Marseille	Niort
--:-- CEST (UTC+2)

3 May 1996 39	Marseille	2–2	Valence	Marseille
--:-- CEST (UTC+2)				Stadium: Stade Vélodrome

10 May 1996 40	OFC Charleville	3–1	Marseille	Charleville
--:-- CEST (UTC+2)

17 May 1996 41	Marseille	4–1	Sochaux	Marseille
--:-- CEST (UTC+2)				Stadium: Stade Vélodrome

21 May 1996 42	Le Mans	1–2	Marseille	Le Mans
--:-- CEST (UTC+2)

=== Coupe de France ===
1 December 1995 Seventh round	FC d'Échirolles	1–4	Marseille
--:-- CET (UTC+1)

17 December 1995 Eighth round	Lempdes SF	1–8	Marseille
--:-- CET (UTC+1)

13 January 1996 Round of 64	USM Endoume Catalans	0–2	Marseille
--:-- CET (UTC+1)

3 February 1996 Round of 32	Marseille	2–0	GSI Pontivy	Marseille
--:-- CET (UTC+1)				Stadium: Stade Vélodrome

24 February 1996 Round of 16	Marseille	2–0	CS de Blénod-lès-Pont-à-Mousson	Marseille
--:-- CET (UTC+1)				Stadium: Stade Vélodrome

16 March 1996 Quarter-finals	Marseille	1–0	Lille	Marseille
--:-- CET (UTC+1)				Stadium: Stade Vélodrome

April 1996 Semi-finals	Marseille	1–1 (a.e.t.) (1–3 p)	Auxerre	Marseille
--:-- CEST (UTC+2)				Stadium: Stade Vélodrome

=== Coupe de la Ligue ===
24 October 1995 First round	Perpignan FC	0–1	Marseille
--:-- CET (UTC+1)

13 December 1995 Round of 32	Marseille	2–1	LB Châteauroux	Marseille
--:-- CET (UTC+1)				Stadium: Stade Vélodrome

6 January 1996 Round of 16	Marseille	2–0	AS Saint-Étienne	Marseille
--:-- CET (UTC+1)				Stadium: Stade Vélodrome

30 January 1996 Quarter-finals	EA Guingamp	1–0	Marseille	Guingamp
--:-- CET (UTC+1)

== Statistics ==
=== Goalscorers ===
Rank	Pos	No.	Nat	Name	French Division 2	Coupe de France	Coupe de la Ligue	Total
1	FW		(Republic of Ireland)	Tony Cascarino	30	0	0	30
2	FW		(France)	Marc Libbra	13	0	0	13
3	MF		(France)	Bernard Ferrer	9	0	0	9
Own goals					0	0	0	0
Totals					69	20	5	94
