= Eric Roy =

Eric Roy may refer to:

- Éric Roy (footballer) (born 1967), French footballer
- Eric Roy (politician) (born 1948), New Zealand politician
