= Cédric Anselin =

French footballer (born 1977)

Personal information
- Date of birth: 24 July 1977 (age 49)
- Place of birth: Lens, Pas-de-Calais, France
- Position: Midfielder

Senior career*
Years	Team	Apps	(Gls)
1995–1999	Bordeaux	9	(0)
1997–1998	→ Lille (loan)	14	(1)
1999	→ Norwich City (loan)	7	(1)
1999–2001	Norwich City	19	(0)
2001–2002	Ross County	11	(0)
2002–2004	Oriente Petrolero		
2004	Mildenhall Town		
2004–2005	Cambridge United	2	(0)
2005	Gravesend & Northfleet		
- King's Lynn
- Dereham Town
- Lowestoft Town
2016–2018	Sheringham		
Total		62	(2)

Managerial career
- 2017–2018: Sheringham
- 2018–2020: Norwich United
- * Club domestic league appearances and goals

Cédric Anselin (born 24 July 1977) is a French former professional footballer who played as a midfielder. He was a French under-21 international. He subsequently managed Norwich United from 2018 to 2020.

== Career ==
Anselin was born in Lens, Pas-de-Calais. He began his career in his native France with Bordeaux and Lille. While with Bordeaux, he played in the 1996 UEFA Cup Final alongside, among others, Zinedine Zidane and Bixente Lizarazu.

Anselin joined English club Norwich City on loan towards the end of the 1998–99 season and signed permanently for a fee of £250,000 in the summer of 1999. He found it difficult to settle at Carrow Road due in part to the language barrier, and the club agreed to release him in the summer of 2001. He scored one goal during his spell at Norwich, his strike coming in a 4–2 win over Oxford United.

He spent the majority of the 2001–02 season with the Scottish club Ross County before his career took him to the Bolivian team Oriente Petrolero. He returned to England, briefly playing with Cambridge United before moving into non-league football. A brief spell at King's Lynn was followed by a move further down the league pyramid to Dereham Town late in 2007. He then signed a contract with Lowestoft Town. On 25 August 2009 he joined the coaching team of Norwich United. He also made a brief 45-minute appearance against a Norwich City XI in a July 2010 preseason friendly.

He subsequently joined Cromer Town, where he became first team coach. In 2016 he joined Sheringham, where he became player-manager of the club.

In 2018 he was appointed manager of Norwich United. He left the club in June 2020. He returned to Sheringham in January 2023 when he was appointed Director of Football.
