= Michael Probst =

German former footballer (born 1962)

Personal information
- Date of birth: 20 November 1962 (age 63)
- Place of birth: Trier, West Germany
- Position: Goalkeeper

Team information
- Current team: FC Deisenhofen (Manager)

Senior career*
Years	Team	Apps	(Gls)
1980–1981	1860 München (A)		
1981–1983	MTV München		
1983–1986	BSC Sendling		
1986–1989	SpVgg Unterhaching		
1989–1991	SV Lohhof		
1991–1992	SV Türk Gücü München		
1992–1995	SV Lohhof		
1995–1997	Bayern Munich (A)	32	(0)
1995–1996	→ Bayern Munich	2	(0)
1997–2000	TuS Geretsried		
2001	TSV Eching		
2001–2002	SpVgg Landshut		
2002	1. FC Miesbach		

Managerial career
- 1999–2000: TuS Geretsried
- 2000–2002: FC Anadolu München
- 2002–2005: SV Neuperlach München
- 2006–2011: FC Deisenhofen
- 2011–2014: TuS Holzkirchen
- * Club domestic league appearances and goals

Michael Probst (born 20 November 1962) is a German former footballer who played as a goalkeeper. He played two Bundesliga games for Bayern Munich in the 1995–96 season, and was on the bench for the 1996 UEFA Cup Final.
