= Marcelo Djian =

Brazilian footballer

Personal information
- Full name: Marcelo Kiremitdjian
- Date of birth: 6 November 1966 (age 59)
- Place of birth: São Paulo, Brazil
- Height: 1.81 m (5 ft 11 in)
- Position: Centre-back

Senior career*
Years	Team	Apps	(Gls)
1987–1993	Corinthians	55	(1)
1993–1997	Lyon	114	(1)
1997–2001	Cruzeiro	65	(1)
2001–2003	Atlético Mineiro	30	(1)

International career
1989–1992	Brazil	2	(0)
- * Club domestic league appearances and goals

Marcelo Kiremitdjian, nicknamed Marcelo Djian or just Marcelo, (born 6 November 1966) is a Brazilian former professional footballer who played as a centre-back for Corinthians, Cruzeiro, Atlético Mineiro and Lyon. He earned two caps with the Brazil national team.

Marcelo was the first in a series of Brazilian internationals who played or are playing with Lyon.

== Honours ==
Corinthians

- Série A: 1990
- Supercopa do Brasil: 1991

Lyon

- Coupe de la Ligue runner-up: 1995–96
- UEFA Intertoto Cup: 1997

Individual

- Bola de Prata: 1990
