= Ghislain Anselmini =

French footballer (born 1970)

Personal information
- Date of birth: 6 May 1970 (age 56)
- Place of birth: Le Coteau, France
- Height: 1.79 m (5 ft 10 in)
- Position: Defender

Senior career*
Years	Team	Apps	(Gls)
1991–1998	Lyon	92	(0)
1993–1994	→ Guingamp (loan)	31	(0)
1998–2000	Guingamp	57	(0)
2000–2002	US Créteil	57	(0)
Total		237	(0)
- * Club domestic league appearances and goals

Ghislain Anselmini (born 6 May 1970) is a French former professional footballer who played as a left-sided defender. He played in Ligue 1 with Olympique Lyonnais.

== Honours ==
Lyon

- UEFA Intertoto Cup: 1997
