= Daniel Dutuel =

French footballer (born 1967)

Personal information
- Full name: Daniel Maurice Dutuel
- Date of birth: 10 December 1967 (age 58)
- Place of birth: Bort-les-Orgues, France
- Height: 1.78 m (5 ft 10 in)
- Position: Midfielder

Youth career
- Ydes Sports
- 1982–1985: Auxerre

Senior career*
Years	Team	Apps	(Gls)
1985–1993	Auxerre	212	(28)
1993–1994	Marseille	34	(3)
1994–1996	Bordeaux	50	(6)
1996–1998	Celta	44	(1)
1998–1999	Valladolid	10	(0)
1999–2000	Bellinzona		
2000–2001	Racing Paris		
Total		350	(38)
- * Club domestic league appearances and goals

Daniel Maurice Dutuel (born 10 December 1967) is a French former professional footballer who played as an attacking midfielder.

Over the course of 11 seasons, he amassed Ligue 1 totals of 296 games and 37 goals. He also played three years in Spain.

== Football career ==
Born in Bort-les-Orgues, Corrèze, Dutuel was a product of the famous Auxerre youth system, which also included Basile Boli, Eric Cantona, William Prunier and Pascal Vahirua, all under the tutelage of legendary Guy Roux. He made his first-team – and Ligue 1 – debut on 16 July 1985 in a 0–0 away draw against Laval (aged not yet 18), and was already an undisputed starter by the time the side reached the semi-finals of the UEFA Cup in 1992–93.

After a spell at Marseille, Dutuel moved to Bordeaux, which he helped to the 1996 edition of the UEFA Cup final, where he scored the club's only goal in an eventual 1–5 aggregate loss to Bayern Munich. Whilst at Bordeaux, he won the 1995 UEFA Intertoto Cup.

Dutuel then moved to Spain where, safe for the 1996–97 season with Celta, he was highly unsuccessful. He also represented Real Valladolid in that country (still in La Liga), and closed out his career two years later after stints with Bellinzona (Switzerland) and Racing Paris.
