= Sylvain Kastendeuch =

French footballer (born 1963)

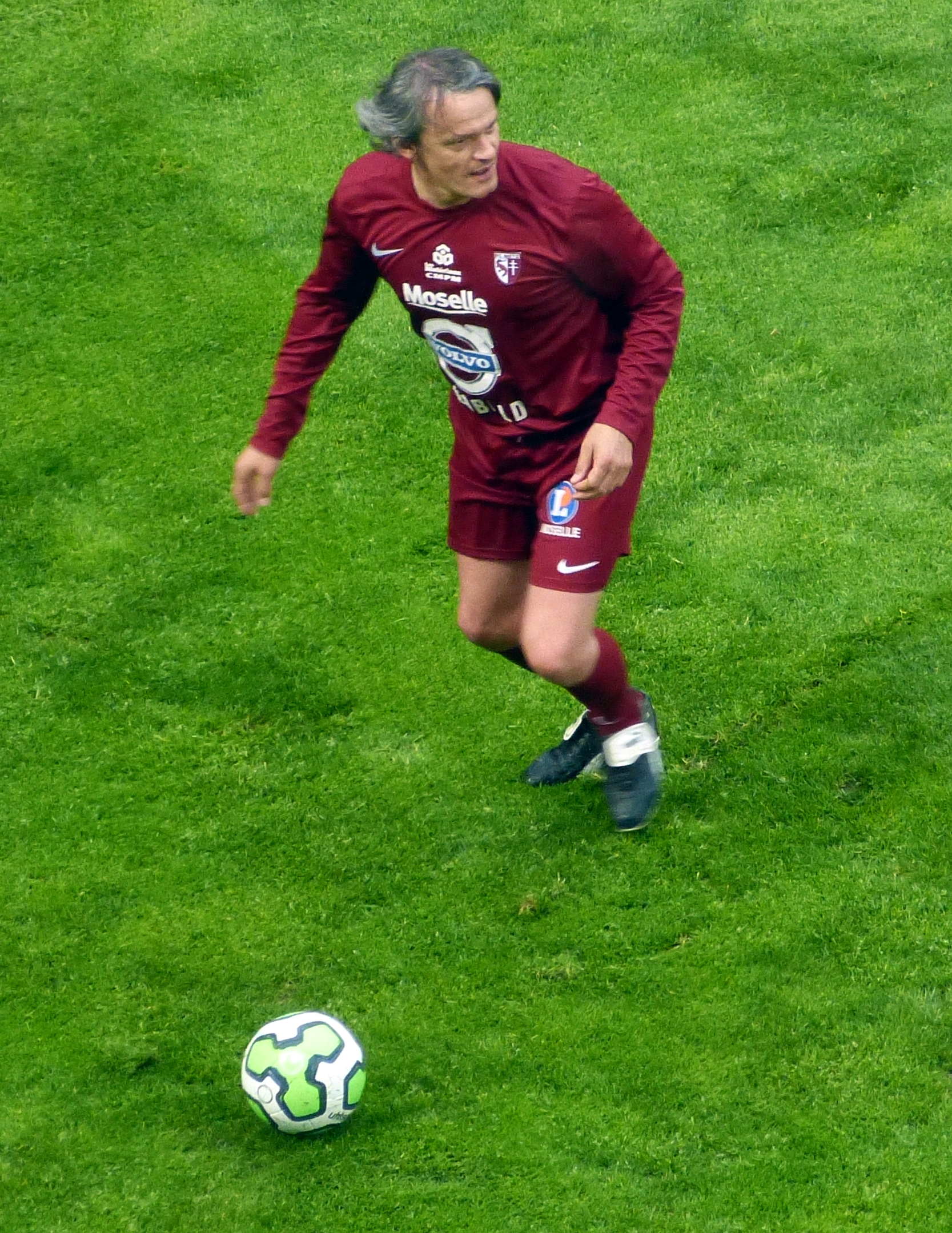
- Kastendeuch in 2013

Personal information
- Full name: Sylvain Pierre Kastendeuch
- Date of birth: 31 August 1963 (age 63)
- Place of birth: Hayange, Moselle, France
- Height: 1.80 m (5 ft 11 in)
- Position: Defender

Senior career*
Years	Team	Apps	(Gls)
1982–1984	Metz	19	(0)
1984–1985	Red Star	34	(3)
1985–1990	Metz	188	(4)
1990–1993	Saint-Étienne	105	(13)
1993–1994	Toulouse	33	(2)
1994–2001	Metz	232	(9)
Total		612	(31)

International career
1987–1989	France	9	(0)
- * Club domestic league appearances and goals

Sylvain Pierre Kastendeuch (born 31 August 1963) is a French former professional footballer who played as a defender. He was capped nine times by the France national team. He is the player with the sixth-most appearances in the Ligue 1. In his entire career, he never received a red card.

== Honours ==
Metz

- Coupe de la Ligue: 1996

Individual

- UNFP Honorary Award: 2011

Orders

- Knight of the Legion of Honour: 2013
