= William Prunier =

French footballer (born 1967)

Personal information
- Date of birth: 14 August 1967 (age 59)
- Place of birth: Montreuil, Seine-Saint-Denis, France
- Height: 1.84 m (6 ft 0 in)
- Position: Defender

Youth career
- Auxerre

Senior career*
Years	Team	Apps	(Gls)
1984–1993	Auxerre	221	(21)
1993–1994	Marseille	35	(4)
1994–1996	Bordeaux	37	(0)
1995–1996	→ Manchester United (trial)	2	(0)
1996	→ Copenhagen (loan)	11	(0)
1996–1997	Montpellier	27	(0)
1997–1998	Napoli	3	(0)
1998–1999	Kortrijk	14	(3)
1999–2004	Toulouse	142	(5)
2004	Al-Siliya		
Total		492	(33)

International career
1992	France	1	(0)

Managerial career
- 2010–2011: Cugnaux
- 2011–2014: Colomiers
- 2014: GS Consolat
- 2017–2018: Toulon
- 2018–2020: Canet Roussillon
- 2022–2023: Bourges
- 2024: Thonon Evian
- 2025–: AS Villers-Houlgate
- * Club domestic league appearances and goals

William Prunier (born 14 August 1967) is a French football manager and former player who was the manager of AS Villers-Houlgate.

As a player, Prunier was a centre-back and spent most of his career in France, primarily with Auxerre where he spent nine years, but also played for clubs in England, Denmark, Italy, Belgium and Qatar, where he finished his career. He also represented France, gaining his only cap in 1992.

== Playing career ==
Prunier was born in Montreuil, Seine-Saint-Denis. Prunier was a product of a Auxerre youth team that also included Eric Cantona, Basile Boli, Pascal Vahirua and Daniel Dutuel, all under the tutelage of Guy Roux. After spending many years at Auxerre, he was signed by UEFA Champions League holders Marseille in 1993. Marseille were relegated to Division 2 the following season due to match-fixing and financial irregularities, and Prunier moved on to Bordeaux, where he won the UEFA Intertoto Cup in 1995 playing alongside Zinedine Zidane. He also earned one cap for France in August 1992, a 2–0 loss to Brazil.

In the 1995–96 season, Prunier had a fleeting and forgettable spell at Manchester United. Having bought out his contract with Bordeaux, he joined the Old Trafford club on a trial basis where he was reunited with Cantona. At the time, the manager Alex Ferguson had been looking for a continental-style defender with good passing skills. However, his arrival coincided with an injury crisis that saw the three first-choice centre-backs Steve Bruce, Gary Pallister and David May all unavailable. Prunier was hastily drafted into the first team, even though Ferguson had originally intended to use him in reserve team matches only during his trial.

Prunier made his Manchester United debut against Queens Park Rangers on 30 December 1995 partnering Gary Neville in defence. He generally impressed in the match and assisted a goal for Andy Cole as well as hitting a powerful shot against the bar. His second game against Tottenham Hotspur on 1 January 1996, however, was a disaster for him and the club. With Peter Schmeichel injured during the game and Denis Irwin unavailable, he was part of a makeshift defence that conceded four goals in a humiliating loss. Prunier has ever since been made something of a scapegoat for the defeat, culminating in his being voted the sixth worst Manchester United footballer of all time. Despite the defeat, Ferguson offered him an extended trial, but Prunier declined and decided he would look elsewhere.

After leaving Manchester United, Prunier moved on to Copenhagen in Denmark and also had spells at Napoli in Italy and Kortrijk in Belgium before returning to France with Toulouse where he won the Ligue 2 title in 2003. After a brief spell in the United Arab Emirates, he retired from football in 2004 and became a coach at Cannes. On 4 February 2007, he appeared on Sky Sports, giving an intro and his point of view on the 4–1 defeat against Tottenham Hotspur in 1996.

== Managerial career ==
Prunier was named head coach of Cugnaux in 2010, followed by spells with Colomiers, Consolat, Toulon and Canet Roussillon. In June 2021, he was appointed assistant coach to manager Cris at Le Mans. The duo left the team in May 2022.

On 29 October 2022, Prunier was appointed manager of Championnat National 2 side Bourges.

== Honours ==
Bordeaux

- UEFA Intertoto Cup: 1995
