= Philippe Lucas =

French footballer (born 1963)

Personal information
- Date of birth: 1 November 1963 (age 62)
- Place of birth: Saint-Cloud, France
- Height: 1.72 m (5 ft 8 in)
- Position: Defensive midfielder

Senior career*
Years	Team	Apps	(Gls)
1980–1982	Guingamp		
1982–1992	Sochaux	266	(2)
1992–1996	Bordeaux	110	(0)
- * Club domestic league appearances and goals

Philippe Lucas (born 1 November 1963 in Saint-Cloud, Hauts-de-Seine) is a French former professional footballer who played as a defensive midfielder. Whilst at Bordeaux he won the 1995 UEFA Intertoto Cup and played in the 1996 UEFA Cup Final.
