= Bixente Lizarazu =

French footballer (born 1969)

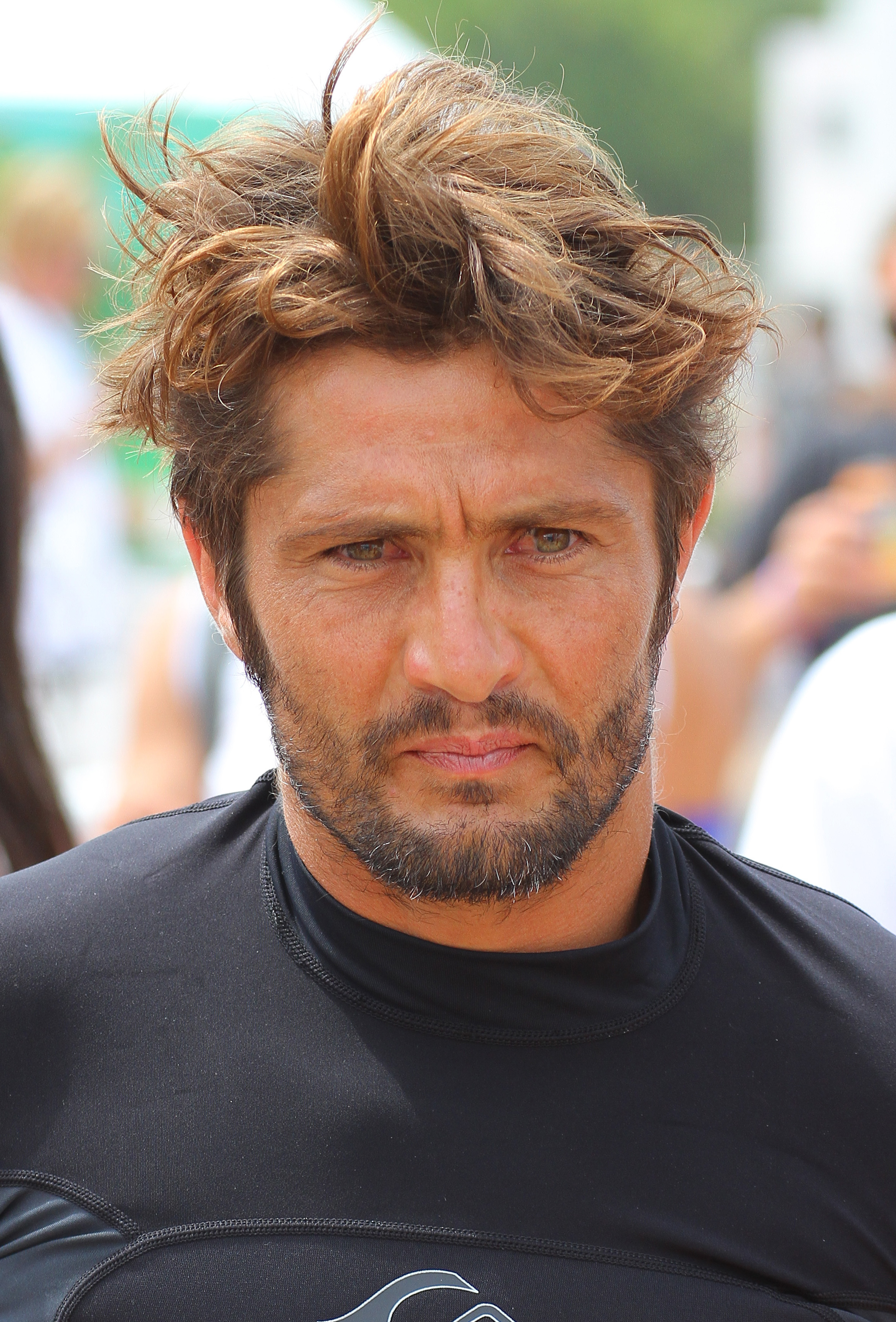
- Lizarazu in 2011

Personal information
- Full name: Bixente Jean Michel Lizarazu
- Date of birth: 9 December 1969 (age 56)
- Place of birth: Saint-Jean-de-Luz, Pyrénées-Atlantiques, France
- Height: 1.69 m (5 ft 7 in)
- Position: Left-back

Youth career
- 1977–1984: Les Églantins Hendaye
- 1984–1988: Bordeaux

Senior career*
Years	Team	Apps	(Gls)
1986–1989	Bordeaux II	43	(10)
1988–1996	Bordeaux	246	(22)
1996–1997	Athletic Bilbao	16	(0)
1997–2004	Bayern Munich	151	(7)
2004	Marseille	14	(0)
2005–2006	Bayern Munich	31	(0)
Total		501	(39)

International career
1992–2004	France	97	(2)
1993	Basque Country	1	(0)
Medal record
Men's football
Representing France
FIFA World Cup
Winner	1998
UEFA European Championship
Winner	2000
FIFA Confederations Cup
Winner	2001
Winner	2003
- * Club domestic league appearances and goals

Bixente Jean Michel Lizarazu (Basque pronunciation: [biˈʃente liˈs̪araˌs̪u], born 9 December 1969) is a French former professional footballer who played as a left-back. Known for his pace, elite athleticism with sharp defensive intelligence; he is widely regarded as one of the greatest full-backs in the history of the sport.

He rose through the ranks at Bordeaux, where he was part of a team that finished second in the French First Division in 1989–1990, were administratively relegated to the Second Division at the end of the 1990–1991 due to financial problems, and then won promotion from the Second Division in the 1991–92 season. His Bordeaux team finished runners-up in the 1995–96 UEFA Cup. As he is a native of the French Basque Country, he was able to join Athletic Club in 1996, but did not nail down a starting spot during his one season at the club.

In 1997, he joined German giants Bayern Munich, where he enjoyed much success. He won six Bundesliga championships with the team, as well as the 2000–01 UEFA Champions League, where he scored his penalty in the shootout in the final.

In a 12-year international career from 1992 to 2004, Lizarazu earned 97 caps for the France national team. He played in three UEFA European Championships and two FIFA World Cups for France, winning the 1998 World Cup and UEFA Euro 2000.

== Early life ==
Bixente Jean Michel Lizarazu was born on 9 December 1969 in Saint-Jean-de-Luz, Pyrénées-Atlantiques, and grew up in Hendaye. He was born into a Basque family, both cities being located in the French Basque Country.

== Club career ==
=== Bordeaux ===
An enthusiast in several sports from a young age, Lizarazu began his professional career with Bordeaux, joining the club's youth setup as a 15-year-old in 1984 and initially playing as a winger. After being told he would not make a career from football due to his frail physicality as a teenager, he impressed the staff with his determination and became a member of the senior squad in 1988 alongside forward Christophe Dugarry. He was retrained to play as a counter-attacking left-back at the suggestion of coach Didier Couécou and soon replaced the veteran Gernot Rohr (later to be the club's manager) in the position.

In 1990 Bordeaux finished runners-up in the French championship, but the following year they were administratively relegated amid financial problems. Lizarazu remained with the club and helped them immediately regain their top tier status in 1992. The club also signed Zinedine Zidane, who became another important element of the team, which went on to achieve two 4th- and a 7th-place finish over the next three seasons, Lizarazu contributing 101 appearances and 15 goals.

In summer 1995, Bordeaux won the UEFA Intertoto Cup to qualify for the 1995–96 UEFA Cup. They would go all the way to the final under coach Rohr, beating Real Betis, A.C. Milan and Slavia Prague before losing to Bayern Munich 5–1 on aggregate. However their league form suffered, dropping to 16th. Following UEFA Euro 1996, in which Dugarry, Zidane and Lizarazu were part of the French squad which reached the semi-finals, the three moved abroad seeking a new challenge: Zidane joining Juventus, Dugarry going to Milan and Lizarazu staying local but changing nations by moving to Athletic Bilbao, based the same distance from his home in the French Basque Country as Bordeaux. He appeared 299 times for his formative club, scoring 28 goals.

=== Athletic Bilbao ===
Lizarazu spent just one season with the La Liga club after becoming the first Frenchman to play for Athletic, which has a policy of selecting only players of Basque birth or heritage.

Suffering from a persistent groin injury, he was unable to displace the experienced Aitor Larrazábal at left-back, received two red cards among the 16 league appearances he did make, and had disagreements with the head coach, compatriot Luis Fernández. In the 1997 close season, he transferred to Bayern Munich.

=== Bayern Munich ===
Before even playing a Bundesliga match, Lizarazu lifted a trophy with his new club, winning the inaugural edition of the preseason DFL-Ligapokal. It was the start of a highly successful spell in Bavaria, despite the interruption of some serious injuries, as he went on to win six Bundesliga championships (including three in a row between 1999 and 2001), as well as five DFB-Pokals, the Champions League in 2001 (scoring his penalty in the shootout), and the Intercontinental Cup. On winning the Intercontinental Cup in 2001, he became the first player to be a current European and World champion in both club and international football.

Lizarazu said that he would leave Bayern in the summer of 2004 and eventually signed with Marseille. However, after only six months back in France, he returned to Bayern Munich in January 2005. During his second spell with Bayern, ending in 2006 when he gave way to the emerging Philipp Lahm, Lizarazu wore the shirt number 69; clarifying that it was not a lewd gesture, he said this was because he was born in 1969, his height is 1.69 m and he weighed 69 kg. He made 268 appearances in all competitions for Bayern between 1997 and 2006, scoring eight goals. 183 of these games were in the German top-flight.

== International career ==
Lizarazu was capped 97 times for France (for the first time on 14 November 1992 against Finland), scoring two goals, and helped them win the 1998 FIFA World Cup and Euro 2000, starting in the final of both tournaments. He was also part of squad for France in the 2002 FIFA World Cup, though France were eliminated from group stage in the tournament without scoring a single goal where he was involved all 3 matches in the group stage. He retired from international football after France were surprisingly eliminated by eventual winners Greece at Euro 2004.

== Style of play ==
Regarded by pundits as one of the best left-backs of his generation, Lizarazu was an attacking full-back or wing-back, who was known for his passing, technique, pace, stamina, and his ability to get up the flank and provide accurate crosses from the touch-line. In addition to his offensive prowess, he was also known for his defensive abilities, despite his diminutive stature, which, along with his speed, allowed him to track back.

== Personal life ==
After retirement, Lizarazu got involved in Brazilian jiu-jitsu. He competed in a jiu-jitsu competition in Europe in 2009, where he became European champion in the Blue Belt Senior 1 Light Division. He is also a keen surfer and works as a football pundit for French television and radio. In 2013, Lizarazu was described as a "tramp" by his successor as France's left-back, Patrice Evra, after he and other pundits criticised Evra for giving an impromptu team talk during half-time of a 2014 FIFA World Cup qualifying match against Belarus. Lizarazu has two children. He is in a relationship with actress Claire Keim with whom he has a daughter. Lizarazu was formerly engaged to singer Elsa Lunghini from 1999 to 2006. Lizarazu is a native speaker of Basque and French. In addition, he also speaks Spanish, German and English.

== Career statistics ==
=== Club ===
Appearances and goals by club, season and competition
Club	Season	League			National cup (Note: Includes Coupe de France, Copa del Rey, DFB-Pokal)		League cup (Note: Includes Coupe de la Ligue, DFL-Ligapokal)		Europe		Other		Total	
Club	Season	Division	Apps	Goals	Apps	Goals	Apps	Goals	Apps	Goals	Apps	Goals	Apps	Goals
Bordeaux	1988–89	Division 1	16	0	1	0	–		0	0	–		17	0
Bordeaux	1989–90	Division 1	38	2	4	0	–		–		–		42	2
Bordeaux	1990–91	Division 1	35	2	1	0	–		6 (Note: Appearances in UEFA Cup)	0	–		42	2
Bordeaux	1991–92	Division 2	33	0	3	0	–		–		–		36	0
Bordeaux	1992–93	Division 1	35	4	3	0	–		–		–		38	4
Bordeaux	1993–94	Division 1	32	9	3	0	–		6	0	–		41	9
Bordeaux	1994–95	Division 1	32	2	2	1	1	0	4	0	–		39	3
Bordeaux	1995–96	Division 1	23	3	0	0	0	0	10	1	7 (Note: Appearances in UEFA Intertoto Cup)	4	40	8
Bordeaux	Total		244	22	17	1	1	0	26	1	7	4	295	28
Athletic Bilbao	1996–97	La Liga	16	0	2	0	–		–		–		18	0
Bayern Munich	1997–98	Bundesliga	19	0	3	0	2	0	2 (Note: Appearances in UEFA Champions League)	0	–		24	0
Bayern Munich	1998–99	Bundesliga	19	2	5	1	0	0	9	0	–		33	3
Bayern Munich	1999–2000	Bundesliga	22	1	1	0	0	0	10	0	–		33	1
Bayern Munich	2000–01	Bundesliga	15	0	1	0	0	0	10	0	–		26	0
Bayern Munich	2001–02	Bundesliga	25	1	1	0	0	0	12	0	2 (Note: One appearance in UEFA Super Cup, one appearance in Intercontinental Cup)	0	40	1
Bayern Munich	2002–03	Bundesliga	26	2	5	0	0	0	3	0	–		34	2
Bayern Munich	2003–04	Bundesliga	26	1	1	0	0	0	8	0	–		35	1
Bayern Munich	Total		152	7	17	1	2	0	54	0	2	0	227	8
Marseille	2004–05	Ligue 1	14	0	0	0	1	0	–		–		15	0
Bayern Munich	2004–05	Bundesliga	13	0	2	0	0	0	4	0	–		19	0
Bayern Munich	2005–06	Bundesliga	18	0	2	0	1	0	6	0	–		27	0
Bayern Munich	Total		31	0	4	0	1	0	10	0	–		46	0
Career total			457	29	40	2	5	0	90	1	9	4	601	36

=== International ===
Appearances and goals by national team and year
National team	Year	Apps	Goals
France	1992	1	0
France	1993	6	0
France	1994	5	0
France	1995	5	1
France	1996	9	0
France	1997	4	0
France	1998	13	1
France	1999	6	0
France	2000	12	0
France	2001	10	0
France	2002	7	0
France	2003	12	0
France	2004	7	0
Total		97	2

Scores and results list France's goal tally first, score column indicates score after each Lizarazu goal.

List of international goals scored by Bixente Lizarazu
No.	Date	Venue	Opponent	Score	Result	Competition
1	15 November 1995	Stade Michel d'Ornano, Caen, France	Israel	2–0	2–0	UEFA Euro 1996 qualifying
2	18 June 1998	Stade de France, Saint-Denis, France	Saudi Arabia	4–0	4–0	1998 FIFA World Cup

== Honours ==
Bordeaux

- Division 2: 1991–92
- UEFA Intertoto Cup: 1995
- UEFA Cup runner-up: 1995–96

Bayern Munich

- Bundesliga: 1998–99, 1999–2000, 2000–01, 2002–03, 2004–05, 2005–06
- DFB-Pokal: 1997–98, 1999–2000, 2002–03, 2004–05, 2005–06
- DFB-Ligapokal: 1997
- UEFA Champions League: 2000–01; runner-up: 1998–99
- Intercontinental Cup: 2001

France

- FIFA World Cup: 1998
- UEFA European Championship: 2000
- FIFA Confederations Cup: 2001, 2003

Individual

- ESM Team of the Year: 1998–99
- UEFA Team of the Year: 2001
- FIFA XI: 2002
- Équipe type spéciale 20 ans des trophées UNFP: 2011

Orders

- Knight of the Legion of Honour: 1998
- Officer of the Legion of Honour: 2025
