= FC Girondins de Bordeaux in European football =

French club in European football

- Club: FC Girondins de Bordeaux
- First entry: 1968–69 European Cup Winners' Cup
- Latest entry: 2018–19 UEFA Europa League

This is the list of all FC Girondins de Bordeaux's European matches.

== Overall record ==
Accurate as of 31 August 2018

Competition	Played	Won	Drew	Lost	GF	GA	GD	Win%
European Cup / Champions League	50	21	16	13	54	54	+0	42.00
Cup Winners' Cup	10	6	1	3	14	10	+4	60.00
UEFA Cup / UEFA Europa League	142	71	28	43	203	152	+51	50.00
UEFA Intertoto Cup	8	6	2	0	22	5	+17	75.00
Total	202	101	45	56	284	211	+73	50.00

Legend: GF = Goals For. GA = Goals Against. GD = Goal Difference.

== Results ==
Season	Competition	Round	Club	Home	Away	Aggregate
1968–69	European Cup Winners' Cup	First Round	(West Germany) Köln	2–1	0–3	2–4
1981–82	UEFA Cup	First Round	(Iceland) Víkingur	4–0	4–0	8–0
1981–82	UEFA Cup	Second Round	(West Germany) Hamburger SV	2–1	0–2	2–3
1982–83	UEFA Cup	First Round	(East Germany) Carl Zeiss Jena	5–0	1–3	6–3
1982–83	UEFA Cup	Second Round	(Socialist Federal Republic of Yugoslavia) Hajduk Split	4–0	1–4	5–4
1982–83	UEFA Cup	Third Round	(Romania) Universitatea Craiova	1–0	0–2 (a.e.t.)	1–2
1983–84	UEFA Cup	First Round	(East Germany) Lokomotive Leipzig	2–3	0–4	2–7
1984–85	European Cup	First Round	(Spain) Athletic Bilbao	3–2	0–0	3–2
1984–85	European Cup	Second Round	(Romania) Dinamo București	1–0	1–1	2–1
1984–85	European Cup	Quarter-finals	(Soviet Union) Dnipro Dnipropetrovsk	1–1	1–1	2–2 (5–3p)
1984–85	European Cup	Semi-finals	(Italy) Juventus	2–0	0–3	2–3
1985–86	European Cup	First Round	(Turkey) Fenerbahçe	2–3	0–0	2–3
1986–87	European Cup Winners' Cup	First Round	(Republic of Ireland) Waterford United	4–0	2–1	6–1
1986–87	European Cup Winners' Cup	Second Round	(Portugal) Benfica	1–0	1–1	2–1
1986–87	European Cup Winners' Cup	Quarter-finals	(Soviet Union) Torpedo Moscow	1–0	2–3	3–3 (a)
1986–87	European Cup Winners' Cup	Semi-finals	(East Germany) Lokomotive Leipzig	0–1	1–0 (a.e.t.)	1–1 (5–6 p)
1987–88	European Cup	First Round	(East Germany) Dynamo Berlin	2–0	2–0	4–0
1987–88	European Cup	Second Round	(Norway) Lillestrøm	1–0	0–0	1–0
1987–88	European Cup	Quarter-finals	(Netherlands) PSV Eindhoven	1–1	0–0	1–1 (a)
1988–89	UEFA Cup	First Round	(Soviet Union) Dnipro Dnipropetrovsk	2–1	1–1	3–2
1988–89	UEFA Cup	Second Round	(Hungary) Újpest	1–0	1–0	2–0
1988–89	UEFA Cup	Third Round	(Italy) Napoli	0–1	0–0	0–1
1990–91	UEFA Cup	First Round	(Northern Ireland) Glenavon	2–0	0–0	2–0
1990–91	UEFA Cup	Second Round	(Germany) Magdeburg	1–0	1–0	2–0
1990–91	UEFA Cup	Third Round	(Italy) Roma	0–2	0–5	0–7
1993–94	UEFA Cup	First Round	(Republic of Ireland) Bohemian	5–0	1–0	6–0
1993–94	UEFA Cup	Second Round	(Switzerland) Servette	2–1	1–0	3–1
1993–94	UEFA Cup	Third Round	(Germany) Karlsruher SC	1–0	0–3	1–3
1994–95	UEFA Cup	First Round	(Norway) Lillestrøm	3–1	2–0	5–1
1994–95	UEFA Cup	Second Round	(Poland) GKS Katowice	1–1	0–1	1–2
1995	UEFA Intertoto Cup	Group Stage (Group 5)	(Sweden) Norrköping	6–2	—N/a	1st Place
1995	UEFA Intertoto Cup	Group Stage (Group 5)	(Republic of Ireland) Bohemians	—N/a	2–0	1st Place
1995	UEFA Intertoto Cup	Group Stage (Group 5)	(Denmark) OB	4–0	—N/a	1st Place
1995	UEFA Intertoto Cup	Group Stage (Group 5)	(Finland) HJK	—N/a	1–1	1st Place
1995	UEFA Intertoto Cup	Round of 16	(Germany) Eintracht Frankfurt	3–0	—N/a	3–0
1995	UEFA Intertoto Cup	Quarter-finals	(Netherlands) SC Heerenveen	2–0	—N/a	2–0
1995	UEFA Intertoto Cup	Semi-finals	(Germany) Karlsruher SC	2–2	2–0	4–2
1995–96	UEFA Cup	First Round	(North Macedonia) Vardar	1–1	2–0	3–1
1995–96	UEFA Cup	Second Round	(Russia) Rotor Volgograd	2–1	1–0	3–1
1995–96	UEFA Cup	Third Round	(Spain) Real Betis	2–0	1–2	3–2
1995–96	UEFA Cup	Quarter-finals	(Italy) Milan	3–0	0–2	3–2
1995–96	UEFA Cup	Semi-finals	(Czech Republic) Slavia Prague	1–0	1–0	2–0
1995–96	UEFA Cup	Final	(Germany) Bayern Munich	1–3	0–2	1–5
1997–98	UEFA Cup	First Round	(England) Aston Villa	0–0	0–1 (a.e.t.)	0–1
1998–99	UEFA Cup	First Round	(Austria) Rapid Wien	1–1	2–1	3–2
1998–99	UEFA Cup	Second Round	(Netherlands) Vitesse	2–1	1–0	3–1
1998–99	UEFA Cup	Third Round	(Switzerland) Grasshoppers	0–0	3–3	3–3 (a)
1998–99	UEFA Cup	Quarter-finals	(Italy) Parma	2–1	0–6	2–7
1999–2000	UEFA Champions League	First Group Stage (Group G)	(Czech Republic) Sparta Prague	0–0	0–0	2nd Place
1999–2000	UEFA Champions League	First Group Stage (Group G)	(Russia) Spartak Moscow	2–1	2–1	2nd Place
1999–2000	UEFA Champions League	First Group Stage (Group G)	(Netherlands) Willem II	4–0	0–0	2nd Place
1999–2000	UEFA Champions League	Second Group Stage (Group B)	(England) Manchester United	1–2	0–2	4th Place
1999–2000	UEFA Champions League	Second Group Stage (Group B)	(Spain) Valencia	1–4	0–3	4th Place
1999–2000	UEFA Champions League	Second Group Stage (Group B)	(Italy) Fiorentina	0–0	3–3	4th Place
2000–01	UEFA Cup	First Round	(Belgium) Lierse	5–1	0–0	5–1
2000–01	UEFA Cup	Second Round	(Scotland) Celtic	1–1	2–1 (a.e.t.)	3–2
2000–01	UEFA Cup	Third Round	(Germany) Werder Bremen	4–1	0–0	4–1
2000–01	UEFA Cup	Fourth Round	(Spain) Rayo Vallecano	1–2	1–4	2–6
2001–02	UEFA Cup	First Round	(Hungary) Debrecen	5–1	1–3	6–4
2001–02	UEFA Cup	Second Round	(Belgium) Standard Liège	2–0	2–0	4–0
2001–02	UEFA Cup	Third Round	(Netherlands) Roda JC	1–0	0–2	1–2
2002–03	UEFA Cup	First Round	(Slovakia) Matador Púchov	6–0	4–1	10–1
2002–03	UEFA Cup	Second Round	(Sweden) Djurgården	2–1	1–0	3–1
2002–03	UEFA Cup	Third Round	(Belgium) Anderlecht	0–2	2–2	2–4
2003–04	UEFA Cup	First Round	(Slovakia) Artmedia Petržalka	2–1	1–1	3–2
2003–04	UEFA Cup	Second Round	(Scotland) Heart of Midlothian	0–1	2–0	2–1
2003–04	UEFA Cup	Third Round	(Poland) Dyskobolia Grodzisk Wielkopolski	4–1	1–0	5–1
2003–04	UEFA Cup	Fourth Round	(Belgium) Club Brugge	3–1	1–0	4–1
2003–04	UEFA Cup	Quarter-finals	(Spain) Valencia	1–2	1–2	2–4
2006–07	UEFA Champions League	Group Stage (Group C)	(England) Liverpool	0–1	0–3	3rd Place
2006–07	UEFA Champions League	Group Stage (Group C)	(Netherlands) PSV Eindhoven	0–1	3–1	3rd Place
2006–07	UEFA Champions League	Group Stage (Group C)	(Turkey) Galatasaray	3–1	0–0	3rd Place
2006–07	UEFA Cup	Round of 32	(Spain) Osasuna	0–0	0–1 (a.e.t.)	0–1
2007–08	UEFA Cup	First Round	(Finland) Tampere United	1–1	3–2	4–3
2007–08	UEFA Cup	Group Stage (Group H)	(Turkey) Galatasaray S.K.	2–1	—N/a	1st Place
2007–08	UEFA Cup	Group Stage (Group H)	Austria Wien	—N/a	2–1	1st Place
2007–08	UEFA Cup	Group Stage (Group H)	(Sweden) Helsingborg	2–1	—N/a	1st Place
2007–08	UEFA Cup	Group Stage (Group H)	(Greece) Panionios	—N/a	3–2	1st Place
2007–08	UEFA Cup	Round of 32	(Belgium) Anderlecht	1–1	1–2	2–3
2008–09	UEFA Champions League	Group Stage (Group A)	(Italy) Roma	1–3	0–2	3rd Place
2008–09	UEFA Champions League	Group Stage (Group A)	(England) Chelsea	1–1	0–4	3rd Place
2008–09	UEFA Champions League	Group Stage (Group A)	(Romania) CFR Cluj	1–0	2–1	3rd Place
2008–09	UEFA Cup	Round of 32	(Turkey) Galatasaray	0–0	3–4	3–4
2009–10	UEFA Champions League	Group Stage (Group A)	(Germany) Bayern Munich	2–1	2–0	1st
2009–10	UEFA Champions League	Group Stage (Group A)	(Italy) Juventus	2–0	1–1	1st
2009–10	UEFA Champions League	Group Stage (Group A)	(Israel) Maccabi Haifa	1–0	1–0	1st
2009–10	UEFA Champions League	Round of 16	(Greece) Olympiacos	2–1	1–0	3–1
2009–10	UEFA Champions League	Quarter-finals	(France) Lyon	1–0	1–3	2–3
2012–13	UEFA Europa League	Playoff Round	(Serbia) Red Star Belgrade	3–2	0–0	3–2
2012–13	UEFA Europa League	Group Stage (Group D)	(England) Newcastle United	2–0	0–3	1st Place
2012–13	UEFA Europa League	Group Stage (Group D)	(Portugal) Marítimo	1–0	1–1	1st Place
2012–13	UEFA Europa League	Group Stage (Group D)	(Belgium) Club Brugge	4–0	2–1	1st Place
2012–13	UEFA Europa League	Round of 32	(Ukraine) Dynamo Kyiv	1–0	1–1	2–1
2012–13	UEFA Europa League	Round of 16	(Portugal) Benfica	2–3	0–1	2–4
2013–14	UEFA Europa League	Group Stage (Group F)	(Germany) Eintracht Frankfurt	0–1	0–3	4th Place
2013–14	UEFA Europa League	Group Stage (Group F)	(Israel) Maccabi Tel Aviv	1–2	0–1	4th Place
2013–14	UEFA Europa League	Group Stage (Group F)	(Cyprus) APOEL	2–1	1–2	4th Place
2015–16	UEFA Europa League	Third Qualifying Round	(Cyprus) AEK Larnaca	3–0	1–0	4–0
2015–16	UEFA Europa League	Playoff Round	(Kazakhstan) Kairat	1–0	1–2	2–2 (a)
2015–16	UEFA Europa League	Group Stage (Group B)	(England) Liverpool	1–1	1–2	4th Place
2015–16	UEFA Europa League	Group Stage (Group B)	(Switzerland) Sion	0–1	1–1	4th Place
2015–16	UEFA Europa League	Group Stage (Group B)	(Russia) Rubin Kazan	2–2	0–0	4th Place
2017–18	UEFA Europa League	Third Qualifying Round	(Hungary) Videoton	2–1	0–1	2–2 (a)
2018–19	UEFA Europa League	Second Qualifying Round	(Latvia) Ventspils	2–1	1–0	3–1
2018–19	UEFA Europa League	Third Qualifying Round	(Ukraine) Mariupol	2–1	3–1	5–2
2018–19	UEFA Europa League	Play-Off Round	(Belgium) Gent	2–0	0–0	2–0
2018–19	UEFA Europa League	Group Stage (Group C)	(Czech Republic) Slavia Prague	2–0	0–1	3rd Place
2018–19	UEFA Europa League	Group Stage (Group C)	(Denmark) Copenhagen	1–2	1–0	3rd Place
2018–19	UEFA Europa League	Group Stage (Group C)	(Russia) Zenit Saint Petersburg	1–1	1–2	3rd Place
