= François Grenet =

French footballer (born 1975)

Personal information
- Full name: François Jean Henri Grenet
- Date of birth: 8 March 1975 (age 51)
- Place of birth: Bordeaux, France
- Height: 1.80 m (5 ft 11 in)
- Positions: Right-back; midfielder

Youth career
- –1989: Aviron Bayonnais
- 1989–1993: Bordeaux

Senior career*
Years	Team	Apps	(Gls)
1993–2001	Bordeaux	177	(4)
2001–2003	Derby County	18	(0)
2002–2003	→ Rennes (loan)	10	(0)
2003–2004	Rennes	8	(0)
2004–2006	Nice	24	(1)
2006	Bordeaux II	0	(0)
Total		237	(5)

International career
1998	Basque Country	1	(0)
- * Club domestic league appearances and goals

François Jean Henri Grenet (born 8 March 1975) is a French former professional footballer who played mostly as a right-back and also as a midfielder.

== Club career ==
=== Bordeaux ===
Grenet was born in Bordeaux, capital of the départment of Gironde. His father Jean Grenet and paternal grandfather Henri Grenet were both politicians who served as mayor of Bayonne; his maternal grandfather Jean Dauger was a French international in rugby union. He started his youth career as a forward at Aviron Bayonnais, moving to his hometown club FC Girondins de Bordeaux in 1989. He made his senior debut in a Ligue 1 match on 2 June 1993 against Lyon. His first Ligue 1 goal came against the same opponent in 1995 and later became a first team regular in 1995–96 season, when Bordeaux lost the 1996 UEFA Cup Final against Bayern Munich. He was also a runner-up twice at the Coupe de la Ligue in 1997 and 1998, losing the final matches against Strasbourg and Paris Saint-Germain, respectively. Both matches were decided in the penalty shootout, with Grenet entering in extra time and missing his penalty in 1997 and starting, but being replaced still in the first half in 1998.

He won his first and only title of his career in 1999, after Bordeaux won the 1998–99 French Division 1. During the summer of 2001, he announced his intention of leaving the club and was targeted by Middlesbrough and Sunderland with a price tag of £3.5m.

=== Derby County ===
After becoming an eventual substitute during the start of the 2001–02 season, Grenet was sold for Derby County, then at the bottom of the table, for a reported fee of £3 million, believing that a move to the Premier League could make him break into the France national football team and also being backed by manager Colin Todd who stated at the time that "the only reason he is not part of the senior French squad is the fact [sic] that Lilian Thuram is in that position". That fee made him the most expensive Derby County footballer at the time amongst other players, but later it was disclosed as £2.2 million by Derby County's chief executive Keith Loring.

He received much criticism during his tenure regarding aerial ineptitude, lack of positional awareness and inability to make a challenge without drawing a foul, also being regularly "embarrassed" by opponents. He played 15 times in a Premier League campaign that ended in relegation to the Football League First Division and three matches early in the 2002–03 season before being loaned to Rennes.

=== Rennes ===
Grenet first arrived at Rennes on loan with a view to a permanent deal when he reached 20 appearances. After only 10 Ligue 1 matches, a calf injury ruled out the possibility of reaching this mark and the clubs agreed the transfer in February 2003 for a total of £900,000. He started three more matches in the season, but had only five league appearances in the following season due to injuries.

=== Nice ===
In 2004, Grenet move on a free transfer to OGC Nice after negotiating the release of the last year of his contract. He featured as a starting right-back during his first season, but was limited to a stoppage injury time appearance against Strasbourg in the 2005–06 season. He was released from the club at the end of the season.

=== Retirement ===
Grenet had decided to end his career after leaving Nice, but trained with the Girondins de Bordeaux II side that played in the CFA in case the club needed his services. In December 2006, he refused an offer to join Chamois Niortais as he had his mind set on retiring from football.

== International career ==
Grenet appeared for the Basque Country as a substitute in a friendly against Uruguay in 1998.
