= Gaëtan Huard =

French former professional footballer (born 1962)

Personal information
- Date of birth: 12 January 1962 (age 64)
- Place of birth: Montargis, France
- Height: 1.85 m (6 ft 1 in)
- Position: Goalkeeper

Youth career
- Amilly
- Pithiviers

Senior career*
Years	Team	Apps	(Gls)
1980–1988	Lens	162	(0)
1988–1991	Marseille	63	(0)
1991–1996	Bordeaux	159	(0)
1996–1997	Hércules	10	(0)
Total		394	(0)
- * Club domestic league appearances and goals

Gaëtan Huard (born 12 January 1962) is a French former professional footballer who played as a goalkeeper.

== Career ==
Born in Montargis, Loiret, Huard played 357 Ligue 1 matches for Lens, Bordeaux and Marseille, winning the 1989 and 1990 Division 1 championships with the latter. During the 1992–93 season with Bordeaux (which would finish third in the 1992–93 French Division 1 final standings), he enjoyed a run of 1,176 minutes (stretching between matchday 17 and 31 of the Division 1 campaign) of Division 1 football without conceding a goal. He helped Bordeaux win the 1995 UEFA Intertoto Cup.

Huard helped Bordeaux reach the 1996 UEFA Cup final, where they lost to Bayern Munich. The 34-year-old had a brief stint in Spain. He played for Hércules during the 1996–97 season, serving as a backup goalkeeper. They were relegated from the La Liga after finishing second-bottom in the table at the conclusion of the 1996–97 La Liga season, after which Huard retired from playing professional football.

Afterwards, Huard worked several years as a sports consultant for Canal+.
