= Laurent Croci =

French footballer (born 1964)

Personal information
- Date of birth: 8 December 1964 (age 61)
- Place of birth: Montbéliard, France
- Height: 1.82 m (6 ft 0 in)
- Position: Defender

Senior career*
Years	Team	Apps	(Gls)
1980–1982	Sochaux B		
1982–1992	Sochaux	321	(12)
1992–1997	Bordeaux	141	(5)
1994–1995	→ Sochaux (loan)	15	(0)
1996	Dundee	1	(0)
1997	Carlisle United	1	(0)
1997–1998	Étoile Carouge	18	(0)
1998–1999	US Lormont		
1999–2000	ES Blanquefort		
Total		497	(17)

Managerial career
- 2000–2001: ES Blanquefort
- 2001–2002: US Créteil
- 2002–2003: Saint-Médrard
- 2004–2005: Stade Poitevin
- 2005–2006: L'Entente SSG
- 2006–2010: Croix de Savoie (Assistant coach)
- 2010–2013: Mulhouse
- * Club domestic league appearances and goals

Laurent Croci (born 8 December 1964) is a French football manager and former player, who last managed FC Mulhouse.

== Playing career ==
Croci was born in Montbéliard, Doubs. He began his career with Sochaux, featuring for the club's 'B' team until he turned 18. Croci spent 10 years in the first team before leaving for Bordeaux. Whilst at Bordeaux he won the 1995 UEFA Intertoto Cup and played in the 1996 UEFA Cup Final, and was cautioned in the first leg.

After five years with Bordeaux, Croci spent time with Scottish side Dundee, before joining Carlisle United. However, he only played one game for each club, before he left for Swiss side Étoile Carouge.

He returned to France to finish his career with amateur sides Lormont and Blanquefort, before managing the latter for the 2000–01 season.
