= Jean-Luc Dogon =

French footballer and manager (born 1967)

Personal information
- Full name: Jean-Luc Dogon
- Date of birth: 13 October 1967 (age 59)
- Place of birth: Valognes, France
- Height: 1.86 m (6 ft 1 in)
- Position: Defender

Team information
- Current team: Bordeaux (U-19 manager)

Senior career*
| Years | Team | Apps | (Gls) |
| 1983–1988 | Laval | 113 | (7) |
| 1988–1989 | Matra Racing | 32 | (1) |
| 1989–1996 | Bordeaux | 209 | (18) |
| 1996–1998 | Strasbourg | 40 | (0) |
| 1998–2000 | Rennes | 30 | (1) |
| 2000–2001 | Créteil | 28 | (2) |
| Total | | 452 | (29) |

International career
| 1993 | France | 1 | (0) |

Managerial career
- 2017–: Bordeaux (U-19)
- * Club domestic league appearances and goals

Jean-Luc Dogon (born 13 October 1967) is a French football coach and a former player. He manages the Under-19 squad of Bordeaux. While at Bordeaux he won the 1995 UEFA Intertoto Cup and played in the 1996 UEFA Cup Final. While at Strasbourg he won the Coupe de la Ligue in 1997, playing in the final.
