= Joachim Fernandez =

French-Senegalese footballer (1972-2016)

Personal information
- Date of birth: 6 December 1972
- Place of birth: Ziguinchor, Senegal
- Date of death: 19 January 2016 (aged 43)
- Height: 1.88 m (6 ft 2 in)
- Position: Defender

Youth career
- Bordeaux

Senior career*
Years	Team	Apps	(Gls)
1993–1994	→ Sedan (loan)	37	(1)
1994–1995	→ Angers (loan)	27	(1)
1995–1996	Bordeaux	5	(0)
1996–1997	Caen	26	(1)
1997	Udinese	1	(0)
1997–1999	Monza	0	(0)
1999–2000	Milan	0	(0)
1998–1999	→ Toulouse (loan)	0	(0)
2000	Dundee United	6	(0)
2001	Persma Manado	2	(1)
Total		104	(4)
- * Club domestic league appearances and goals

Joachim Fernandez (6 December 1972 – 19 January 2016) was a professional footballer who played as a defender. Born in Senegal, he held French citizenship.

He played for Sedan, Angers, Bordeaux, Caen, Udinese, Monza, Toulouse, Dundee United and Persma Manado. (Note: Joachim Fernandez – French league stats at LFP – also available in French (archived))

== Career ==
Born in Senegal, Fernandez was a FC Girondins de Bordeaux youth product. He spent two seasons on loan in French Division 2 with Sedan and Angers.

After returning from loan, Fernandez made his Ligue 1 debut with Bordeaux under manager Slavoljub Muslin in November 1995, in a match against Lens. In December, he played against Real Betis in the second leg of the 1995–96 UEFA Cup round of 16, at the Estadio Benito Villamarín. Bordeaux lost 2–1 but progressed to the quarter-final thanks to a 2–0 win in the first leg. In the second half of the season he made just four appearances under Muslin and Muslin's successor Gernot Rohr. One of these appearances was as a substitute in Bordeaux's 3–0 win against A.C. Milan in the UEFA Cup quarter-final.

Having been released by Bordeaux at the end of the 1995–96 season, Fernandez joined Caen, also of Ligue 1, where he played for most of the season. He continued his career in Italy but made no appearances while at Udinese, Monza and Milan, and on loan at French club Toulouse.

Fernandez moved to Scotland in summer 2000 signing a two-year contract with Scottish Premier League club Dundee United. While at Dundee United, he notably had an altercation with Everton's Paul Gascoigne during a friendly match. Having made seven appearances and with the club placed last in the league, he was released in December, five months into his contract.

He played two matches for Persma Manado in Indonesia before retiring from playing at the age of 29, due to a knee injury.

== Personal life ==
Fernandez had a wife and a son. He later separated from his wife and no longer saw his son. He spent parts of his wages supporting family in Senegal.

He died on 19 January 2016 in Domont, aged 43. He was buried in Senegal.
