= Éric Roy (footballer) =

French football player and manager (1967–2026)

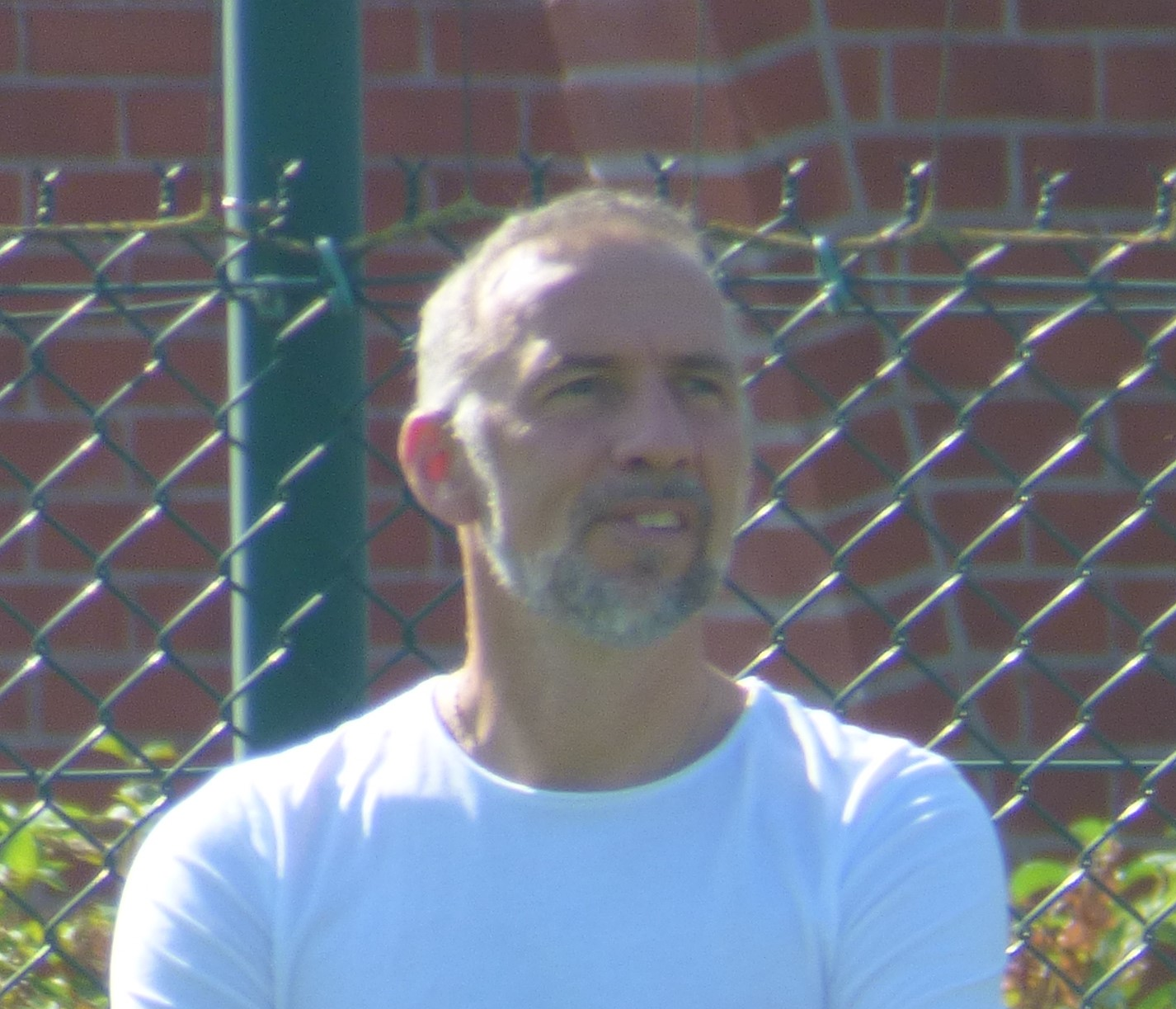
- Roy in 2018

Personal information
- Full name: Éric Serge Armand Roy
- Date of birth: 26 September 1967
- Place of birth: Nice, Alpes-Maritimes, France
- Date of death: 17 June 2026 (aged 58)
- Height: 1.88 m (6 ft 2 in)
- Position: Midfielder

Senior career*
| Years | Team | Apps | (Gls) |
| 1988–1992 | Nice | 86 | (4) |
| 1992–1993 | Toulon | 34 | (2) |
| 1993–1996 | Lyon | 111 | (9) |
| 1996–1999 | Marseille | 77 | (10) |
| 1999–2000 | Sunderland | 27 | (0) |
| 2001 | Troyes | 6 | (0) |
| 2001–2002 | Rayo Vallecano | 12 | (0) |
| 2002–2004 | Nice | 52 | (2) |
| Total | | 405 | (27) |

Managerial career
- 2010–2011: Nice
- 2023–2026: Brest
- * Club domestic league appearances and goals

Éric Serge Armand Roy (French pronunciation: [eʁik sɛʁʒ aʁmɑ̃ ʁwa]; 26 September 1967 – 17 June 2026) was a French professional football player and manager. He spent the majority of his playing career in his native France, also playing for Sunderland in England and Rayo Vallecano in Spain. As a manager, he led Ligue 1 side Brest to their first ever participation in European football when they qualified for the 2024–25 UEFA Champions League. He managed Brest until his death in 2026.

== Early life ==
Éric Serge Armand Roy was born on 26 September 1967 in Nice, Alpes-Maritimes. His father, Serge Roy, was also a footballer.

== Playing career ==
Roy began playing professional football with Nice, before joining Toulon, Lyon, Marseille, followed by playing abroad for Sunderland.

During his spell in England with Sunderland, he scored once, in a 5–0 win over Walsall in the League Cup. He later returned to France to play for Troyes and then joined Spanish side Rayo Vallecano, before ending his career at Nice.

== Coaching and management career ==
=== Nice ===
After retiring, in September 2005 Roy was hired as director of marketing, communication and public relations at his last club Nice. In September 2008, he changed position to director of development and public relations. One year later, he was promoted as sporting director. In March 2010, he was appointed manager of Nice, alongside of a coach holding the professional trainer diploma, which Roy did not. In addition to his function as sports director, Roy would receive a salary over 13 months of €17,500 in addition to bonuses. He stepped down from the position in November 2011 by mutual agreement while retaining his duties as sports director.

==== Sacking and prosecution ====
After a phone call in May 2012 for a prior interview, Roy was officially dismissed on 11 June 2012 for serious misconduct. The club through its dismissal letter asserted that he made a 12-day trip to Argentina with an unlicensed agent despite opposition from management and without prior preparation. Roy appealed to the Nice Labor Court, and a judgment was issued in June 2013: the dismissal had no real and serious cause and condemned the employer for nonpayment (€22,159 in addition to paid leave relating thereto as a reminder of salary, €97,500 in addition to paid vacation relating thereto as compensation in lieu of notice, €113,750 in severance pay, €37,573 in addition to paid vacation relating to it match and classification bonuses, €90,000 in addition to paid holidays relating thereto as maintenance bonus, €300,000 as damages for unfair dismissal, €3,000 on the basis of the provisions of article 700 of the code of civil procedure besides whole costs).

Nice appealed the decision. First, that Roy should not have received his second remuneration as supervisor from November 2011 to the extent that it was agreed that he would give up, from that date, the daily management of the first team to occupy only its function of sports director. Second, Nice considered that the dismissal was perfectly regular, even in the absence of prior referral to the Legal Commission of the Professional Football League, and this insofar as its employee was not covered by the charter professional football, but the collective agreement for administrative and similar football staff (CCPAAF). Third, the club considered that Roy's dismissal was perfectly justified in view of his insubordination and his lack of loyalty.

The case ended with Nice paying Roy nearly €300,000 for a wrongful dismissal.

=== Lens ===
On 30 September 2017, Roy was appointed sporting director of Lens. He left the position in April 2019.

=== Watford ===
In December 2019, Roy took the role of sporting director at Premier League club Watford.

=== Brest ===
On 3 January 2023, Roy became the manager of Ligue 1 side Brest. In the 2023–24 season, he led the club to secure their first ever participation in European competitions, by finishing third in the league which qualified them to the UEFA Champions League.

== Television career ==
In 2012, Roy became a consultant for the television sports channel beIN Sports where he was a consultant in the program Le Club from Monday to Thursday at 7 p.m. and Friday during the pre-match and the post-match of the Ligue 1 games with Florian Genton. He left the position in 2017.

From 2019, he became a consultant for France Télévisions. He was a commentator on the matches of the Coupe de France and the Coupe de la Ligue with Kader Boudaoud (until December 2019) and later Fabien Lévêque.

== Death ==
Roy died on 17 June 2026, at the age of 58. His family announced that he had been battling pancreatic cancer for three-and-a-half years.

== Managerial statistics ==
Managerial record by team and tenure
| Team | From | To | Record | | | | |
| Team | From | To | G | W | D | L | Win % |
|---|---|---|---|---|---|---|---|
| Nice | 9 March 2010 | 15 November 2011 | 70 | 22 | 25 | 23 | 31.43 |
| Brest | 3 January 2023 | 17 June 2026 | 142 | 60 | 33 | 49 | 42.25 |
| Total | | | 212 | 82 | 58 | 72 | 38.68 |

== Honours ==
=== Player ===
Lyon

- Coupe de la Ligue runner-up: 1995–96

Marseille

- UEFA Cup runner-up: 1998–99

=== Manager ===
Individual

- Ligue 1 Manager of the Season: 2023–24
- French Manager of the Year: 2023–24
