= Didier Thimothée =

French footballer (born 1970)

Personal information
- Date of birth: 25 June 1970 (age 56)
- Place of birth: Paris, France
- Height: 1.84 m (6 ft 0 in)
- Position: Forward

Senior career*
Years	Team	Apps	(Gls)
1987–1989	CO Savigny		
1989–1990	Caen B		
1990–1992	Caen	5	(1)
1992–1995	Red Star	93	(33)
1995–1998	Saint-Étienne	84	(31)
1998–2000	Montpellier	34	(11)
2000–2001	Châteauroux B		
2001	Bellinzona	5	(1)
2001	Zhejiang Greentown		
2005	US Sainte-Marienne		
- * Club domestic league appearances and goals

Didier Thimothée (born 25 June 1970) is a French former professional footballer who played as a forward for French Ligue 1 clubs Caen, Saint-Étienne, Montpellier and Châteauroux between 1990 and 2001.

== Career ==
Born in Paris, Thimothée began playing football in the youth system at CO Savigny. He signed his first professional contract with Caen, where he suffered a knee injury which limited his availability with the senior side. He made his Ligue 1 debut and scored his first league goal with Caen.

After his contract with Caen expired, Thimothée signed for Ligue 2 side Red Star where he played from 1992 to 1995. Next, he returned to Ligue 1 with Saint-Étienne. Thimothée followed this with an injury-plagued spell at Montpellier before finishing his professional career playing in China.
