= Franck Histilloles =

French footballer (born 1973)

Personal information
- Date of birth: 25 January 1973 (age 53)
- Place of birth: Forbach, France
- Height: 1.87 m (6 ft 2 in)
- Position: Midfielder

Youth career
- Bordeaux

Senior career*
Years	Team	Apps	(Gls)
1994–1997	Bordeaux	36	(3)
1997–1999	Metz	30	(2)
1999–2001	Créteil	88	(9)
2001–2003	Panachaiki	36	(4)
2003–2004	Aviron Bayonnais		
2004–2005	Martigues		
2005–2006	Béziers Saint-Chignan		
- * Club domestic league appearances and goals

Franck Histilloles (born 25 January 1973) is a former footballer who played as a midfielder for clubs in France and Greece.

== Career ==
Born in Forbach, Histilloles began his career playing for the youth team of Girondins de Bordeaux. In 1994, he made his Ligue 1 debut with Bordeaux at age 20. After three seasons with the club, he moved to fellow Ligue 1 club FC Metz. Two seasons later, he joined Ligue 2 club US Créteil-Lusitanos.

In December 2001, Créteil ran into financial difficulties and Histilloles left on a free transfer for Super League Greece side Panachaiki He spent 1.5 seasons with Panachaiki, appearing in 36 league matches for the club.

Histilloles returned to France and finished his career playing in the lower levels of French football.
