= Régis Castant =

French footballer (born 1973)

Personal information
- Date of birth: 15 September 1973 (age 53)
- Place of birth: Créon, France
- Height: 1.65 m (5 ft 5 in)
- Position: Midfielder

Senior career*
Years	Team	Apps	(Gls)
1991–1995	Bordeaux B		
1995–1996	Bordeaux	12	(1)
1996–1998	Trélissac		
1998–1999	Stade Bordelais		
1999–2009	Libourne		

Managerial career
- 2011–2012: Libourne (joint)
- * Club domestic league appearances and goals

Régis Castant (born 15 September 1973) is a French former professional footballer who played as a midfielder. In his career, he played for Bordeaux, Trélissac, Stade Bordelais, and Libourne.

== Honours ==
Bordeaux

- UEFA Cup runner-up: 1995–96

Libourne

- Championnat de France Amateur: 2002–03 Group D
