= 1995–96 Coupe de la Ligue =

French League Cup

Tournament details
- Country: France
- Dates: 23 August 1995 – 6 April 1996
- Teams: 48

Final positions
- Champions: Metz (1st title)
- Runners-up: Lyon

Tournament statistics
- Matches played: 46
- Goals scored: 120 (2.61 per match)
- Top goal scorer: Four players (3 goals)

The 1995–96 Coupe de la Ligue began on 23 August 1995 and the final took place on 6 April 1996 at the Stade de France. Paris Saint-Germain were the defending champions, but were knocked-out by Guingamp in the Second round. Metz went on to win the tournament, beating Lyon 5–4 on penalties in the final.

== First preliminary round ==
The matches were played on 23 August 1995.

Team 1	Score	Team 2
Valenciennes	1–0	Sedan
Istres	2–5	Nîmes

== Second preliminary round ==
The matches were played on 19 September 1995.

Team 1	Score	Team 2
Beauvais	1–0	Nîmes
Stade Briochin	3–2	Valenciennes

== First round ==
The matches were played on 24 October 1995.

Team 1	Score	Team 2
Angers	1–0	Épinal
Sochaux	3–4	Louhans-Cuiseaux
Le Mans	0–1	Amiens
Mulhouse	3–0	Stade Poitevin
Dunkerque	1–0	Valence
Perpignan	0–1	Marseille
Nancy	1–1 (a.e.t.) (4–3 p)	Laval
Caen	0–0 (a.e.t.) (4–3 p)	Toulouse
Châteauroux	2–0	Charleville
Stade Briochin	0–0 (a.e.t.) (6–7 p)	Red Star
Lorient	1–0	Beauvais
Alès	0–1	Niort

== Second round ==
The matches were played on 12 and 13 December 1995.

Team 1	Score	Team 2
Auxerre	2–0	Lens
Le Havre	1–0	Bastia
Bordeaux	1–1 (a.e.t.) (4–5 p)	Saint-Étienne
Montpellier	0–1	Nantes
Nice	2–2 (a.e.t.) (0–2 p)	Monaco
Martigues	1–2	Cannes
Metz	3–1	Dunkerque
Amiens	1–1 (a.e.t.) (1–0 p)	Strasbourg
Rennes	2–0	Louhans-Cuiseaux
Angers	0–3	Lyon
Lille	4–1	Caen
Gueugnon	2–0	Nancy
Marseille	2–1	Châteauroux
Red Star	4–4 (a.e.t.) (4–3 p)	Lorient
Mulhouse	0–1	Niort
Guingamp	2–1	Paris Saint-Germain

== Round of 16 ==
The matches were played on 6 and 17 January 1996.

Team 1	Score	Team 2
Monaco	2–0	Auxerre
Marseille	2–0	Saint-Étienne
Niort	1–0	Gueugnon
Red Star	1–2	Cannes
Lyon	3–1	Amiens
Nantes	2–3	Guingamp
Rennes	2–4	Le Havre
Metz	2–0	Lille

== Quarter-finals ==
The matches were played on 30 January 1996.

Team 1	Score	Team 2
Guingamp	1–0	Marseille
Lyon	1–0	Monaco
Cannes	1–0	Le Havre
Niort	0–2	Metz

== Semi-finals ==
The matches were played on 13 February 1996.

Team 1	Score	Team 2
Guingamp	1–2	Metz
Lyon	1–0	Cannes

== Final ==
The final was played on 6 April 1996 at the Parc des Princes.

6 April 1996
17:00

Lyon	0–0	Metz
Penalties
Roche (penalty missed); Assadourian (penalty scored); Maurice (penalty scored); Roy (penalty scored); Olmeta (penalty scored); Marcelo (penalty missed)	4–5	(penalty missed) Kastendeuch; (penalty scored) Gaillot; (penalty scored) Isaias; (penalty scored) Pires; (penalty scored) Adam; (penalty scored) Pouget

Parc des Princes, Paris
Attendance: 45,368
Referee: Marc Batta
