= Anthony Bancarel =

French footballer (born 1971)

Personal information
- Date of birth: 15 May 1971 (age 55)
- Place of birth: Millau, France
- Height: 1.80 m (5 ft 11 in)
- Position: Striker

Senior career*
| Years | Team | Apps | (Gls) |
| 1989–1994 | Toulouse | 108 | (26) |
| 1994–1997 | Bordeaux | 82 | (19) |
| 1996–1997 | → Caen (loan) | 28 | (7) |
| 1997–1998 | Guingamp | 16 | (5) |
| 1998–1999 | Sion | 11 | (2) |
| 1999–2001 | Créteil | 48 | (11) |
| 2001 | Ajaccio | 13 | (6) |
| 2001–2003 | Toulouse | 40 | (7) |
| Total | | 346 | (83) |

International career
| 1993 | France B | 1 | (0) |
- * Club domestic league appearances and goals

Anthony Bancarel (born 15 May 1971) is a French former professional footballer played as a striker.

He is best known as a member of the Girondins Bordeaux team that reached the UEFA Cup final in 1996, losing to Bayern Munich. He had previously been part of the side that won the 1995 UEFA Intertoto Cup.
