= Jakob Friis-Hansen =

Danish footballer (born 1967)

Personal information
- Date of birth: 6 March 1967 (age 59)
- Place of birth: Copenhagen, Denmark
- Height: 1.86 m (6 ft 1 in)
- Position: Defender

Youth career
- 1972–1982: B 1903

Senior career*
Years	Team	Apps	(Gls)
1983–1987	B 1903	43	(1)
1987–1988	Lyngby	25	(4)
1988–1989	B 1903	37	(3)
1989–1995	Lille	217	(4)
1995–1996	Bordeaux	18	(2)
1996–1997	Hamburger SV	16	(1)
Total		366	(15)

International career
1990–1996	Denmark	19	(0)

Managerial career
- 2003–2007: Hellerup IK
- 2007–2008: BK Fremad Amager
- 2012–2013: Skovshoved IF
Medal record
Men's football
Representing Denmark
FIFA Confederations Cup
Winner	1995 Saudi Arabia
- * Club domestic league appearances and goals

Jakob Friis-Hansen (born 6 March 1967) is a Danish former professional footballer who played as a defender. At club level, he spent most of his career with French club Lille OSC. For the Denmark national team, he made 19 appearances.

He is an old friend of former England forward Teddy Sheringham.

He was formerly a scout for Liverpool F.C., and worked as Director of the European Recruitment for Southampton between 2011 and 2012.
