= 2001–02 FC Metz season =

FC Metz
2001–02 season
- President: Carlo Molinari
- Head coach: Albert Cartier (until January); Francis De Taddeo (caretaker); Gilbert Gress (from January)
- Stadium: Stade Saint-Symphorien
- Division 1: 17th (relegated)
- Coupe de France: Round of 32
- Coupe de la Ligue: Round of 32
- Top goalscorer: League: Jonathan Jäger (6); All: Jonathan Jäger (10)
- Average home league attendance: 17,485

The 2001–02 season was FC Metz's 70th season in existence and the club's second consecutive season in the top flight of French football. In addition to the domestic league, Metz participated in this season's edition of the Coupe de France. The season covered the period from 1 July 2001 to 30 June 2002.

== Players ==
=== First-team squad ===
Note: Flags indicate national team as defined under FIFA eligibility rules; some limited exceptions apply. Players may hold more than one non-FIFA nationality.

No.	Pos.	Nation	Player
—	GK	CMR	Jacques Songo'o
—	GK	FRA	Johan Liébus
—	GK	FRA	Ludovic Butelle
—	GK	TOG	Kossi Agassa
—	DF	FRA	Sylvain Marchal
—	DF	USA	David Régis
—	DF	FRA	Philippe Gaillot
—	DF	FRA	Patrick Moreau
—	MF	TUR	Kasım Yıldız
—	MF	FRA	Mario Espartero
—	MF	FRA	Ludovic Asuar

No.	Pos.	Nation	Player
—	MF	FRA	Grégory Proment
—	MF	FRA	Stéphane Morisot
—	MF	FRA	Grégory Leca
—	MF	ARG	Patricio D'Amico
—	MF	SEN	Oumar Sané
—	FW	CMR	Joseph-Désiré Job
—	FW	CRO	Igor Jovićević
—	FW	FRA	Gérald Baticle
—	FW	TOG	Emmanuel Adebayor
—	FW	UKR	Serhiy Skachenko

== Transfers ==
=== In ===
No.	Pos	Player	Transferred from	Fee	Date	Source
	GK	(France) Johan Liébus	(France) Le Mans UC 72	€6.50m	1 July 2001	
	GK	(Cameroon) Jacques Songo'o	(Spain) Deportivo La Coruña	Free	1 July 2001	
	FW	(Croatia) Igor Jovićević	(Croatia) NK Zagreb		1 July 2001	
	MF	(Senegal) Oumar Sané	(France) Louhans-Cuiseaux		1 July 2001	
	DF	(France) Patrick Moreau	(France) Bastia		1 July 2001	
	MF	(Argentina) Patricio D'Amico	(France) Wasquehal	Loan	1 August 2001	
	GK	(Togo) Kossi Agassa	(Ivory Coast) Africa Sports	Free	23 February 2002	
	FW	(Cameroon) Joseph-Désiré Job	(England) Middlesbrough	Loan	1 January 2002	

=== Out ===
No.	Pos	Player	Transferred from	Fee	Date	Source
	GK	(Colombia) Faryd Mondragón	(Turkey) Galatasaray	Loan + €500k	1 July 2001	
	MF	(France) Ludovic Asuar	(France) Sedan	Free	5 October 2001	

== Pre-season and friendlies ==
Win Draw Loss

July 2001 Friendly	Metz	v
CEST (UTC+2)

== Competitions ==
=== Overview ===
Competition	First match	Last match	Starting round	Final position	Record							
Competition	First match	Last match	Starting round	Final position	Pld	W	D	L	GF	GA	GD	Win %
Division 1	28 July 2001	4 May 2002	Matchday 1	17th	34	9	6	19	31	47	−16	26.47
Coupe de France	14 December 2001	19 January 2002	Round of 64	Round of 32	2	1	0	1	6	2	+4	50.00
Coupe de la Ligue	1 December 2001		Round of 32	Round of 32	1	0	0	1	4	5	−1	0.00
Total					37	10	6	21	41	54	−13	27.03

Source: Competitions

=== Division 1 ===
==== League table ====
Pos	Team	Pld	W	D	L	GF	GA	GD	Pts	Qualification or relegation
14	Sedan	34	8	15	11	35	39	−4	39	
15	Monaco	34	9	12	13	36	41	−5	39	
16	Guingamp	34	9	8	17	34	57	−23	35	
17	Metz (R)	34	9	6	19	31	47	−16	33	Relegation to Ligue 2
18	Lorient (R)	34	7	10	17	43	64	−21	31	UEFA Cup first round and relegated to Ligue 2 (Note: Lorient was qualified for the 2002–03 UEFA Cup as winners of the 2001–02 Coupe de France.)

Source: Ligue 1
Rules for classification: 1) points; 2) goal difference; 3) number of goals scored.
(R) Relegated

==== Results summary ====
Overall								Home						Away					
Pld	W	D	L	GF	GA	GD	Pts	W	D	L	GF	GA	GD	W	D	L	GF	GA	GD
34	9	6	19	31	47	−16	33	7	2	8	20	19	+1	2	4	11	11	28	−17

Source: Division 1

==== Results by round ====
Round	1	2	3	4	5	6	7	8	9	10	11	12	13	14	15	16	17	18	19	20	21	22	23	24	25	26	27	28	29	30	31	32	33	34
Ground	A	H	A	H	A	H	A	H	A	H	A	A	H	A	H	A	H	A	H	A	H	A	H	A	H	A	H	H	A	H	A	H	A	H
Result	L	W	L	L	L	L	W	W	D	L	L	L	W	L	W	D	L	L	D	D	L	W	L	L	W	L	L	L	L	W	D	W	L	D
Position	13	7	13	14	15	17	16	12	12	15	15	16	15	16	15	13	15	16	16	17	17	16	17	17	17	17	18	18	18	17	16	16	16	17

Source: Division 1
A = Away; H = Home; W = Win; D = Draw; L = Loss

==== Matches ====
28 July 2001 1	Lorient	1–0	Metz	Lorient
20:00 CEST (UTC+2)

4 August 2001 2	Metz	2–1	Troyes	Metz
20:00 CEST (UTC+2)				Stadium: Stade Saint-Symphorien

11 August 2001 3	Montpellier	3–0	Metz	Montpellier
20:00 CEST (UTC+2)

18 August 2001 4	Metz	0–1	Lens	Metz
20:00 CEST (UTC+2)				Stadium: Stade Saint-Symphorien

25 August 2001 5	Sedan	2–0	Metz	Sedan
20:00 CEST (UTC+2)

8 September 2001 6	Metz	0–1	Bastia	Metz
20:00 CEST (UTC+2)				Stadium: Stade Saint-Symphorien

15 September 2001 7	Guingamp	0–2	Metz	Guingamp
20:00 CEST (UTC+2)

22 September 2001 8	Metz	2–0	Lyon	Metz
20:00 CEST (UTC+2)				Stadium: Stade Saint-Symphorien

29 September 2001 9	Nantes	0–0	Metz	Nantes
20:00 CEST (UTC+2)

13 October 2001 10	Metz	0–2	Marseille	Metz
17:15 CEST (UTC+2)				Stadium: Stade Saint-Symphorien

21 October 2001 11	Bordeaux	1–0	Metz	Bordeaux
18:00 CEST (UTC+2)

27 October 2001 12	Lille	2–0	Metz	Lille
20:00 CEST (UTC+2)

4 November 2001 13	Metz	2–0	Auxerre	Metz
18:00 CET (UTC+1)				Stadium: Stade Saint-Symphorien

17 November 2001 14	Sochaux	2–0	Metz	Montbéliard
20:00 CEST (UTC+2)

=== Coupe de France ===
14 December 2001 Round of 64	Metz	5–0	Grenoble	Metz
20:00 CET (UTC+1)	Proment 26'; Jäger 30' (pen.), 63'; Moreno 69'; Leca 78'			Stadium: Stade Saint-Symphorien; Attendance: 2,684; Referee: Alain Hamer (Luxembourg)

19 January 2002 Round of 32	Libourne-Saint-Seurin	2–1 (a.e.t.)	Metz	Libourne
18:00 CET (UTC+1)	Castant 54'; Moreau 119' (o.g.)		Jäger 41'	Stadium: Stade Jean-Antoine Moueix; Attendance: 7,500; Referee: Thierry Auriac

=== Coupe de la Ligue ===
1 December 2001 Round of 32	Lorient	5–4	Metz	Lorient
18:00 CET (UTC+1)	Keita 23'; Feindouno 30'; Darcheville 59'; Medina 88'; Druon 90+4'		Jäger 25', 40'; Baticle 56'; Sané 90'	Stadium: Stade du Moustoir; Attendance: 6,731; Referee: Philippe Kalt
