= 2002–03 FC Metz season =

Metz
2002–03 season
- President: Carlo Molinari
- Head coach: Jean Fernandez
- Stadium: Stade Saint-Symphorien
- Ligue 2: 3rd (promoted)
- Coupe de France: Round of 16
- Coupe de la Ligue: Semi-finals
- Top goalscorer: League: Emmanuel Adebayor (13); All: Emmanuel Adebayor (15)
- Highest home attendance: 25,913 vs Gueugnon
- Lowest home attendance: 9,531 vs Créteil
- Average home league attendance: 13,115
- Biggest win: Metz 4–0 Caen; Metz 4–0 Le Mans; Metz 4–0 Nancy; Metz 4–0 Gueugnon
- Biggest defeat: Toulouse 3–0 Metz

The 2002–03 season was the 71st season in the existence of FC Metz and the club's first season back in the second division of French football. In addition to the domestic league, Metz participated in this season's editions of the Coupe de France and the Coupe de la Ligue.

== Transfers ==
=== In ===
| No. | Pos | Player | Transferred from | Fee | Date | Source |
|---|---|---|---|---|---|---|
| 25 | DF | (United States) Oguchi Onyewu | (United States) Clemson Tigers | Free | | |
| | FW | (Senegal) Mamadou Niang | (France) Troyes | Loan | | |
| 23 | FW | (France) Eric Hassli | (England) Southampton | Loan return | | |
| | FW | (Colombia) Tressor Moreno | (Colombia) América de Cali | Loan return | | |

=== Out ===
| No. | Pos | Player | Transferred from | Fee | Date | Source |
|---|---|---|---|---|---|---|
| | MF | (France) Julien François | (France) Grenoble | Free | | |
| 21 | FW | (Ukraine) Serhiy Skachenko | (Switzerland) Aarau | Free | | |

== Competitions ==
=== Overall record ===
| Competition | First match | Last match | Starting round | Final position | Record | | | | | | | |
| Competition | First match | Last match | Starting round | Final position | Pld | W | D | L | GF | GA | GD | Win % |
|---|---|---|---|---|---|---|---|---|---|---|---|---|
| Ligue 2 | 3 August 2002 | 23 May 2003 | Matchday 1 | 3rd | 38 | 19 | 10 | 9 | 52 | 29 | +23 | 50.00 |
| Coupe de France | 23 November 2003 | 15 February 2003 | Round of 64 | Round of 16 | 5 | 3 | 1 | 1 | 11 | 2 | +9 | 60.00 |
| Coupe de la Ligue | 7 December 2002 | 15 April 2003 | Round of 32 | Semi-finals | 4 | 3 | 0 | 1 | 6 | 3 | +3 | 75.00 |
| Total | | | | | 47 | 25 | 11 | 11 | 69 | 34 | +35 | 53.19 |

Source: Competitions

=== Ligue 2 ===
==== League table ====
| Pos | Team | Pld | W | D | L | GF | GA | GD | Pts | Promotion or Relegation |
|---|---|---|---|---|---|---|---|---|---|---|
| 1 | Toulouse (C, P) | 38 | 21 | 9 | 8 | 50 | 24 | +26 | 72 | Promotion to Ligue 1 |
| 2 | Le Mans (P) | 38 | 18 | 14 | 6 | 49 | 33 | +16 | 68 | Promotion to Ligue 1 |
| 3 | Metz (P) | 38 | 19 | 10 | 9 | 52 | 29 | +23 | 67 | Promotion to Ligue 1 |
| 4 | Lorient | 38 | 18 | 11 | 9 | 43 | 29 | +14 | 65 | |
| 5 | Châteauroux | 38 | 16 | 12 | 10 | 40 | 35 | +5 | 60 | |

Source: Ligue 2
(C) Champions; (P) Promoted

==== Results summary ====
| Overall | | | | | | | | Home | | | | | | Away | | | | | |
| Pld | W | D | L | GF | GA | GD | Pts | W | D | L | GF | GA | GD | W | D | L | GF | GA | GD |
|---|---|---|---|---|---|---|---|---|---|---|---|---|---|---|---|---|---|---|---|
| 38 | 19 | 10 | 9 | 52 | 29 | +23 | 67 | 15 | 3 | 1 | 38 | 8 | +30 | 4 | 7 | 8 | 14 | 21 | −7 |

Source: Ligue 2

==== Results by round ====
| Round | 1 | 2 | 3 | 4 | 5 | 6 | 7 | 8 | 9 | 10 | 11 | 12 | 13 | 14 | 15 | 16 | 17 | 18 | 19 | 20 | 21 | 22 | 23 | 24 | 25 | 26 | 27 | 28 | 29 | 30 | 31 | 32 | 33 | 34 | 35 | 36 | 37 | 38 |
|---|---|---|---|---|---|---|---|---|---|---|---|---|---|---|---|---|---|---|---|---|---|---|---|---|---|---|---|---|---|---|---|---|---|---|---|---|---|---|
| Ground | A | H | A | H | A | A | H | A | H | A | H | A | H | A | H | A | H | A | H | A | H | A | H | H | A | H | A | H | A | H | A | H | A | H | A | H | A | H |
| Result | W | D | L | W | D | L | W | L | D | L | W | L | W | W | W | D | W | D | W | W | D | L | W | W | D | W | D | W | W | L | D | W | D | W | L | W | L | W |
| Position | 4 | 5 | 11 | 7 | 10 | 13 | 9 | 12 | 12 | 14 | 10 | 15 | 10 | 6 | 5 | 4 | 3 | 4 | 3 | 3 | 4 | 4 | 3 | 2 | 3 | 2 | 2 | 2 | 2 | 2 | 2 | 2 | 3 | 3 | 3 | 3 | 3 | 3 |

Source: Ligue 2
A = Away; H = Home; W = Win; D = Draw; L = Loss

==== Matches ====
| 3 August 2002 1 | Gueugnon | 0–2 | Metz | Gueugnon |
| 20:00 CEST (UTC+2) | | Report | Proment 82'; Hassli 89' | Stadium: Stade Jean Laville; Attendance: 4,089; Referee: Yves Brizou |

| 10 August 2002 2 | Metz | 0–0 | Reims | Metz |
| 20:00 CEST (UTC+2) | | Report | | Stadium: Stade Saint-Symphorien; Attendance: 14,568; Referee: Stéphane Bré |

| 17 August 2002 3 | Toulouse | 3–0 | Metz | Toulouse |
| 17:30 CEST (UTC+2) | Braizat 43'; Fauré 76'; Taïder 84' | Report | | Stadium: Stadium de Toulouse; Attendance: 7,844; Referee: Pascal Viléo |

| 24 August 2002 4 | Metz | 2–1 | Lorient | Metz |
| 20:00 CEST (UTC+2) | Borbiconi 2'; Adebayor 78' | Report | Loko 35' | Stadium: Stade Saint-Symphorien; Attendance: 12,972; Referee: Gilles Veissière |

| 31 August 2002 5 | Istres | 1–1 | Metz | Fos-sur-Mer |
| 20:00 CEST (UTC+2) | Ragued 41' | Report | Adebayor 53' | Stadium: Stade Parsemain; Attendance: 1,818; Referee: Thierry Auriac |

| 5 September 2002 6 | Le Mans | 1–0 | Metz | Le Mans |
| 20:30 CEST (UTC+2) | Cousin 11' | Report | | Stadium: Stade Léon-Bollée; Attendance: 8,994; Referee: Bertrand Layec |

| 11 September 2002 7 | Metz | 2–0 | Wasquehal | Metz |
| 20:30 CEST (UTC+2) | Frutos 19'; Adebayor 26' | Report | | Stadium: Stade Saint-Symphorien; Attendance: 9,589; Referee: Dominique Fraise |

| 15 September 2002 8 | Niort | 2–0 | Metz | Niort |
| 18:30 CEST (UTC+2) | Michel 12'; Darbelet 39' | Report | | Stadium: Stade René Gaillard; Attendance: 3,889; Referee: Éric Poulat |

| 20 September 2002 9 | Metz | 1–1 | Saint-Étienne | Metz |
| 20:30 CEST (UTC+2) | Bastien 3' | Report | Carteron 90' (pen.) | Stadium: Stade Saint-Symphorien; Attendance: 12,151; Referee: Claude Colombo |

| 29 September 2002 10 | Clermont | 2–1 | Metz | Clermont-Ferrand |
| 17:45 CEST (UTC+2) | Samson 6', 47' | Report | Jäger 30' | Stadium: Stade Gabriel Montpied; Attendance: 6,882; Referee: Gilles Chéron |

| 5 October 2002 11 | Metz | 1–0 | Beauvais | Metz |
| 20:00 CEST (UTC+2) | Jäger 7' | Report | | Stadium: Stade Saint-Symphorien; Attendance: 10,063; Referee: Yves Brizou |

| 18 October 2002 12 | Valence | 3–1 | Metz | Valence |
| 20:15 CEST (UTC+2) | Moreira 53'; Tchomogo 73'; Calce 85' | Report | Jäger 63' | Stadium: Stade Georges Pompidou; Attendance: 4,436; Referee: Franck Glochon |

| 26 October 2002 13 | Metz | 1–0 | Créteil | Metz |
| 20:00 CEST (UTC+2) | Jäger 48' | Report | | Stadium: Stade Saint-Symphorien; Attendance: 9,531; Referee: Laurent Duhamel |

| 3 November 2002 14 | Nancy | 1–2 | Metz | Tomblaine |
| 18:00 CET (UTC+1) | Hadji 36' | Report | Adebayor 38'; Proment 77' (pen.) | Stadium: Stade Marcel Picot; Attendance: 12,969; Referee: Éric Poulat |

| 9 November 2002 15 | Metz | 2–0 | Châteauroux | Metz |
| 20:00 CET (UTC+1) | Bah 3'; Adebayor 80' | Report | | Stadium: Stade Saint-Symphorien; Attendance: 11,750; Referee: Damien Ledentu |

| 16 November 2002 16 | Laval | 1–1 | Metz | Laval |
| 20:00 CET (UTC+1) | Mauricio 60' | Report | Bastien 50' | Stadium: Stade Francis Le Basser; Attendance: 3,348; Referee: Gilles Chéron |

| 29 November 2002 17 | Metz | 4–0 | Caen | Metz |
| 20:30 CET (UTC+1) | Proment 35'; Adebayor 42', 46', 82' | Report | | Stadium: Stade Saint-Symphorien; Attendance: 10,750; Referee: Bertrand Layec |

| 4 December 2002 18 | Grenoble | 0–0 | Metz | Grenoble |
| 20:30 CET (UTC+1) | | Report | | Stadium: Stade des Alpes; Attendance: 6,749; Referee: Hervé Piccirillo |

| 19 December 2002 19 | Metz | 1–0 | Amiens | Metz |
| 20:30 CET (UTC+1) | Bastien 21' | Report | | Stadium: Stade Saint-Symphorien; Attendance: 9,602; Referee: Régis Champet |

| 16 January 2003 21 | Metz | 0–0 | Toulouse | Metz |
| 20:30 CET (UTC+1) | | Report | | Stadium: Stade Saint-Symphorien; Attendance: 9,807; Referee: Stéphane Moulin |

| 22 January 2003 22 | Lorient | 2–0 | Metz | Lorient |
| 20:30 CET (UTC+1) | Loko 69'; Guel 71' | Report | | Stadium: Stade du Moustoir; Attendance: 7,059 |

| 28 January 2003 23 | Metz | 4–1 | Istres | Metz |
| 19:00 CET (UTC+1) | Adebayor 9'; Pouget 33'; Bastien 65'; Borbiconi 85' | Report | Rémy 69' | Stadium: Stade Saint-Symphorien; Attendance: 9,757; Referee: Franck Glochon |

| 31 January 2003 24 | Metz | 4–0 | Le Mans | Metz |
| 20:30 CET (UTC+1) | Bah 30'; Proment 41'; Adebayor 60', 66' | Report | | Stadium: Stade Saint-Symphorien; Attendance: 9,966 |

| 5 February 2003 25 | Wasquehal | 0–0 | Metz | Wasquehal |
| 20:30 CET (UTC+1) | | Report | | Stadium: Complexe Lucien Montagne; Attendance: 1,192; Referee: Fredy Fautrel |

| 8 February 2003 26 | Metz | 2–1 | Niort | Metz |
| 20:00 CET (UTC+1) | Borbiconi 77'; Adebayor 89' | Report | Azzopardi 72' | Stadium: Stade Saint-Symphorien; Attendance: 11,406; Referee: Stéphane Djouzi |

| 22 February 2003 27 | Saint-Étienne | 1–1 | Metz | Saint-Étienne |
| 20:00 CET (UTC+1) | Hognon 4' | Report | Borbiconi 1' | Stadium: Stade Geoffroy-Guichard; Attendance: 12,486; Referee: Stéphane Bré |

| 1 March 2003 28 | Metz | 2–1 | Clermont | Metz |
| 20:00 CET (UTC+1) | Proment 68' (pen.); Niang 89' | Report | Deniaud 13' | Stadium: Stade Saint-Symphorien; Attendance: 10,942; Referee: Eric Brocas |

| 8 March 2003 29 | Beauvais | 1–2 | Metz | Beauvais |
| 20:00 CET (UTC+1) | Poueys 84' | Report | Borbiconi 35'; Proment 82' | Stadium: Stade Pierre Brisson; Attendance: 3,349; Referee: Tony Chapron |

| 16 March 2003 20 | Reims | 0–2 | Metz | Reims |
| 15:00 CET (UTC+1) | | Report | Bah 63'; Marchal 71' | Stadium: Stade Auguste-Delaune; Attendance: 7,053; Referee: Régis Champet |

| 22 March 2003 30 | Metz | 1–2 | Valence | Metz |
| 20:00 CET (UTC+1) | Niang 57' | Report | Tchomogo 36', 44' | Stadium: Stade Saint-Symphorien; Attendance: 15,327 |

| 28 March 2003 31 | Créteil | 1–1 | Metz | Créteil |
| 20:00 CET (UTC+1) | Buengo 8' | Report | Borbiconi 11' | Stadium: Stade Dominique Duvauchelle; Attendance: 2,702; Referee: Claude Medam |

| 4 April 2003 32 | Metz | 4–0 | Nancy | Metz |
| 20:15 CEST (UTC+2) | Walter 39'; Frutos 57'; Niang 78' (pen.); Pouget 86' | Report | | Stadium: Stade Saint-Symphorien; Attendance: 21,081; Referee: Stéphane Bré |

| 12 April 2003 33 | Châteauroux | 0–0 | Metz | Châteauroux |
| 20:00 CEST (UTC+2) | | Report | | Stadium: Stade Gaston Petit; Attendance: 10,857; Referee: Éric Poulat |

| 19 April 2003 34 | Metz | 2–1 | Laval | Metz |
| 20:00 CEST (UTC+2) | Niang 36'; Frutos 68' | Report | Devineau 88' | Stadium: Stade Saint-Symphorien; Attendance: 15,648; Referee: Damien Ledentu |

| 3 May 2003 35 | Caen | 1–0 | Metz | Caen |
| 20:00 CEST (UTC+2) | Deroin 59' (pen.) | Report | | Stadium: Stade Michel d'Ornano; Attendance: 11,388; Referee: Gilles Veissière |

| 9 May 2003 36 | Metz | 1–0 | Grenoble | Metz |
| 20:00 CEST (UTC+2) | Niang 72' | Report | | Stadium: Stade Saint-Symphorien; Attendance: 18,371; Referee: Fredy Fautrel |

| 16 May 2003 37 | Amiens | 1–0 | Metz | Amiens |
| 20:00 CEST (UTC+2) | Abriel 55' | Report | | Stadium: Stade de la Licorne; Attendance: 7,897; Referee: Jean-Marc Bonnin |

| 23 May 2003 38 | Metz | 4–0 | Gueugnon | Metz |
| 20:30 CEST (UTC+2) | Proment 6' (pen.); D'Amico 20'; Adebayor 54'; Jäger 89' | Report | | Stadium: Stade Saint-Symphorien; Attendance: 25,913; Referee: Bruno Ruffray |

=== Coupe de France ===
| 23 November 2002 Seventh round | CO Châlons | 0–8 | Metz | Béziers |
| --:-- CET (UTC+1) | | | | Stadium: Stade de Sauclières |

| 14 December 2002 Eighth round | Avion | 0–1 | Metz | Avion |
| --:-- CET (UTC+1) | | | | Stadium: Stade François Blin |

| 4 January 2003 Round of 64 | Nice | 0–0 (a.e.t.) (2–4 p) | Metz | Nice |
| 20:00 CET (UTC+1) | | | | Stadium: Stade du Ray; Attendance: 9,153; Referee: Damien Ledentu |

| 25 January 2003 Round of 32 | Nancy | 0–1 | Metz | Tomblaine |
| 15:00 CET (UTC+1) | | | Borbiconi 10' | Stadium: Stade Marcel Picot; Attendance: 9,419; Referee: Philippe Kalt |

| 15 February 2003 Round of 16 | Martigues | 2–1 | Metz | Martigues |
| 16:00 CET (UTC+1) | Bilici 11'; Baléguhé 38' | | Frutos 45' | Stadium: Stade Francis Turcan; Attendance: 2,122; Referee: Éric Poulat |

=== Coupe de la Ligue ===
| 7 December 2002 Round of 32 | Martigues | 0–1 | Metz | Martigues |
| 18:00 CEST (UTC+2) | | | Jäger 58' | Stadium: Stade Francis Turcan; Attendance: 883; Referee: Stéphane Lannoy |

| 19 January 2003 Round of 16 | Metz | 1–0 | Bordeaux | Metz |
| 18:00 CEST (UTC+2) | Proment 49' | | | Stadium: Stade Saint-Symphorien; Attendance: 15,728; Referee: Gilles Veissière |

| 5 March 2003 Quarter-finals | Nantes | 0–2 | Metz | Nantes |
| 21:00 CEST (UTC+2) | | | Adebayor 82' (pen.), 87' | Stadium: Stade de la Beaujoire; Attendance: 26,258; Referee: Pascal Viléo |

| 15 April 2003 Semi-finals | Sochaux | 3–2 (a.e.t.) | Metz | Montbéliard |
| 21:00 CEST (UTC+2) | Frau 47', 69'; Monsoreau 99' | | Proment 27'; Niang 87' | Stadium: Stade Auguste Bonal; Attendance: 19,331; Referee: Laurent Duhamel |

== Statistics ==
=== Goalscorers ===
| Rank | No. | Pos | Nat | Name | Ligue 2 | Coupe de France | Coupe de la Ligue | Total |
|---|---|---|---|---|---|---|---|---|
| 1 | 29 | FW | (Togo) | Emmanuel Adebayor | 13 | 0 | 2 | 15 |
| 2 | 12 | MF | (France) | Grégory Proment | 7 | 0 | 2 | 9 |
| 3 | 4 | DF | (France) | Stéphane Borbiconi | 6 | 1 | 0 | 7 |
| 4 | 20 | FW | (France) | Jonathan Jäger | 5 | 0 | 1 | 6 |
| 4 | | FW | (Senegal) | Mamadou Niang | 5 | 0 | 1 | 6 |
| 6 | 17 | MF | (France) | Alexandre Frutos | 3 | 1 | 0 | 4 |
| 6 | 8 | MF | (France) | Christophe Bastien | 4 | 0 | 0 | 4 |
| 8 | 24 | DF | (Guinea) | Almamy Schuman Bah | 3 | 0 | 0 | 3 |
| 9 | | FW | (France) | Cyrille Pouget | 2 | 0 | 0 | 2 |
| 9 | | FW | (Argentina) | Patricio D'Amico | 1 | 0 | 0 | 1 |
| 9 | 23 | FW | (France) | Eric Hassli | 1 | 0 | 0 | 1 |
| 9 | 18 | DF | (France) | Sylvain Marchal | 1 | 0 | 0 | 1 |
| 9 | 29 | MF | (France) | Christophe Walter | 1 | 0 | 0 | 1 |
| Totals | | | | | 52 | 2 | 6 | 60 |
