= Fernando D'Amico =

Argentine footballer

Personal information
- Full name: Fernando Osvaldo D'Amico
- Date of birth: 10 February 1975 (age 51)
- Place of birth: Buenos Aires, Argentina
- Height: 1.80 m (5 ft 11 in)
- Position: Midfielder

Senior career*
Years	Team	Apps	(Gls)
–1995	All Boys	29	(0)
1995–1997	Huracán Corrientes	58	(3)
1997–1998	Quilmes	15	(1)
1998–1999	Badajoz	8	(0)
1999–2003	Lille	113	(3)
2003–2005	Le Mans	34	(2)
2005	Pontevedra	16	(1)
2005–2006	Ethnikos Piraeus		
2006–2007	Extremadura	26	(3)
2007–2009	Badajoz		

Managerial career
- 2009–2012: Badajoz (director of sports)
- * Club domestic league appearances and goals

Fernando D'Amico (born 10 February 1975) is an Argentine former professional footballer who played as a midfielder.

== Playing career ==
D'Amico started his career with Argentine side All Boys, where he made twenty-nine league appearances and scored zero goals. In 1995, he signed for Argentine side Huracán Corrientes, where he made fifty-eight league appearances and scored three goals. Two years later, he signed for Argentine side Quilmes, where he made fifteen league appearances and scored one goal before signing for Badajoz in 1998, where he made eight league appearances and scored zero goals. One year later, he signed for French side Lille, where he made 113 league appearances and scored three goals and helped the club achieve promotion from the second tier to the top flight and played in the UEFA Champions League.

Subsequently, he signed for French side Le Mans in 2003, where he made thirty-four league appearances and scored two goals. During the summer of 2005, he signed for Spanish side Pontevedra, where he made sixteen league appearances and scored one goal. The same year, he signed for Greek side Ethnikos Piraeus. Ahead of the 2006–07 season, he signed for Spanish side Extremadura, where he made twenty-six league appearances and scored three goals. Following his stint there, he returned to Spanish side Badajoz in 2007.

== Personal life ==
D'Amico was born on 10 February 1975 in Buenos Aires, Argentina. The twin brother of Patricio D'Amico, he has been married. After retiring from professional football, he worked as a children's book author.
