= Alexandre Frutos =

French association football player (born 1982)

Personal information
- Full name: Alexandre Frutos
- Date of birth: 23 April 1982 (age 44)
- Place of birth: Vitry-le-François, France
- Height: 5 ft 9 in (1.75 m)
- Position: Midfielder

Team information
- Current team: VV Tielt

Senior career*
| Years | Team | Apps | (Gls) |
| 2000–2005 | Metz | 65 | (3) |
| 2004–2005 | → Châtearoux (loan) | 26 | (2) |
| 2005–2007 | Brighton & Hove Albion | 45 | (3) |
| 2008–2010 | RFC Tournai | 64 | (6) |
| 2010–2012 | KSK Ronse | 32 | (9) |
| 2012–2015 | KSV Oudenaarde | | |
| 2015–2016 | Sint-Eloois-Winkel | | |
| 2016–2018 | KM Torhout | | |
| 2018–2019 | KSK Ronse | | |
| 2019–2020 | RFC Tournai | | |
| 2020– | VV Tielt | | |
- * Club domestic league appearances and goals as of 21:05, 2 February 2021 (UTC)

Alexandre Frutos (born 23 April 1982) is a French professional football player of Spanish origin, currently playing for VV Tielt. He is a left-footed winger.

== Career ==
=== Club career ===
Frutos began his football career with Metz in 2000. In 2004, he joined Ligue 1 side Châteauroux on loan before joining English side Brighton and Hove Albion the following season with French compatriot Sébastien Carole.

Frutos made 36 appearances for Brighton in the Championship during the 2005-06 season, scoring 3 goals. During the 2006-07 season in League One, Frutos failed to make an impact in the Brighton first team and only made a handful of appearances under manager Dean Wilkins. In July 2007 he agreed to have his Brighton contract cancelled by mutual consent. Since then he has become a journeyman in the Belgium lower leagues playing for RFC Tournai, KSK Ronse.
