= Almamy Schuman Bah =

Guinean footballer (born 1974)

Schuman Bah
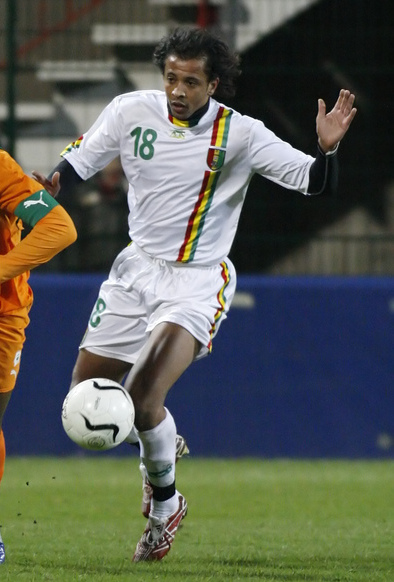
- Schuman Bah in 2007

Personal information
- Full name: Almamy Schuman Bah
- Date of birth: 24 August 1974 (age 52)
- Place of birth: Léhon, France
- Height: 1.83 m (6 ft 0 in)
- Position: Defender

Senior career*
Years	Team	Apps	(Gls)
1997–1998	Le Mans		
1998–2000	Châteauroux	39	(1)
2000	Louhans-Cuiseaux	4	(0)
2001	Châteauroux	12	(0)
2001–2003	FC Metz	46	(4)
2004	Neuchâtel Xamax	7	(1)
2004–2005	Malatyaspor	15	(3)
2005–2006	Clermont Foot	9	(0)
2006–2007	Cannes		

International career
- Guinea
- * Club domestic league appearances and goals

Almamy Schuman Bah (born 24 August 1974), also known as Schuman Bah, is a Guinean football player.

== Club career ==
In 2004, he went from FC Metz to Turkish Super League team Malatyaspor. However, because of injuries, he could play only 15 matches for the Turkish side and his contract was cancelled at the end of season and he moved to Clermont Foot.

Other teams he has played for are Le Mans UC72, Berrichonne de Châteauroux and Neuchâtel Xamax.

== International career ==
He was part of the Guinean 2004 African Nations Cup team, who finished second in their group in the first round of competition, before losing in the quarter-finals to Mali.
