= Grégory Leca =

French footballer (born 1980)

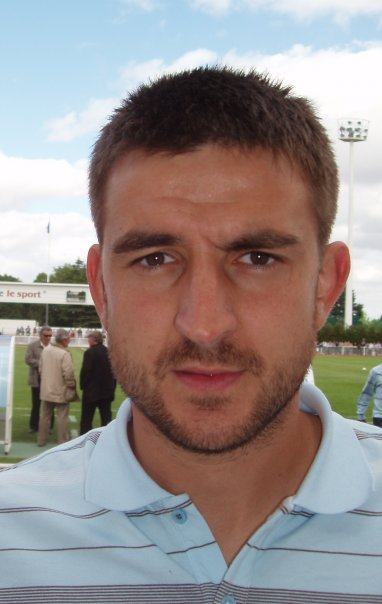
- Leca in 2008

Personal information
- Date of birth: 22 August 1980 (age 46)
- Place of birth: Metz, France
- Height: 1.83 m (6 ft 0 in)
- Positions: Midfielder; defender

Youth career
- Metz

Senior career*
Years	Team	Apps	(Gls)
2000–2005	Metz	124	(3)
2005–2013	Caen	189	(3)
2010–2013	Caen B	13	(0)
Total		326	(6)

International career
2009	Corsica	1	(0)
- * Club domestic league appearances and goals

Grégory Leca (born 22 August 1980) is a French former professional footballer who played for FC Metz and Stade Malherbe Caen. He featured as a midfielder and as a defender.

== Career statistics ==
=== Club ===
Appearances and goals by club, season and competition
Club	Season	League			Coupe de France		Coupe de la Ligue		Total		Ref.
Club	Season	Division	Apps	Goals	Apps	Goals	Apps	Goals	Apps	Goals	Ref.
Metz	2000–01	Division 1	16	0	1	0	—		17	1	
Metz	2001–02	Division 1	22	0	2	1	1	0	25	1	
Metz	2002–03	Ligue 2	14	0	3	0	3	0	20	0	
Metz	2003–04	Ligue 1	36	1	1	0	1	0	38	1	
Metz	2004–05	Ligue 1	34	2	1	0	1	0	36	2	
Metz	2005–06	Ligue 1	2	0	—		—		2	0	
Metz	Total		124	3	8	1	5	0	137	4	—
Caen	2005–06	Ligue 2	25	2	1	0	2	0	28	2	
Caen	2006–07	Ligue 2	29	0	—		1	0	30	0	
Caen	2007–08	Ligue 1	18	0	1	0	1	0	20	0	
Caen	2008–09	Ligue 1	25	0	2	0	1	0	28	0	
Caen	2009–10	Ligue 2	34	0	2	0	1	0	37	0	
Caen	2010–11	Ligue 1	26	0	1	0	—		27	0	
Caen	2011–12	Ligue 1	25	1	1	0	3	0	29	1	
Caen	2012–13	Ligue 2	7	0	—		—		7	0	
Caen	Total		189	3	8	0	9	0	206	3	—
Caen B	2010–11	Championnat National	3	0	—		—		3	0	
Caen B	2011–12	Championnat National	3	0	—		—		3	0	
Caen B	2012–13	Championnat National	7	0	—		—		7	0	
Caen B	Total		13	0	0	0	0	0	13	0	—
Career total			326	6	16	1	14	0	356	7	—
