= Johan Liébus =

French footballer (born 1978)

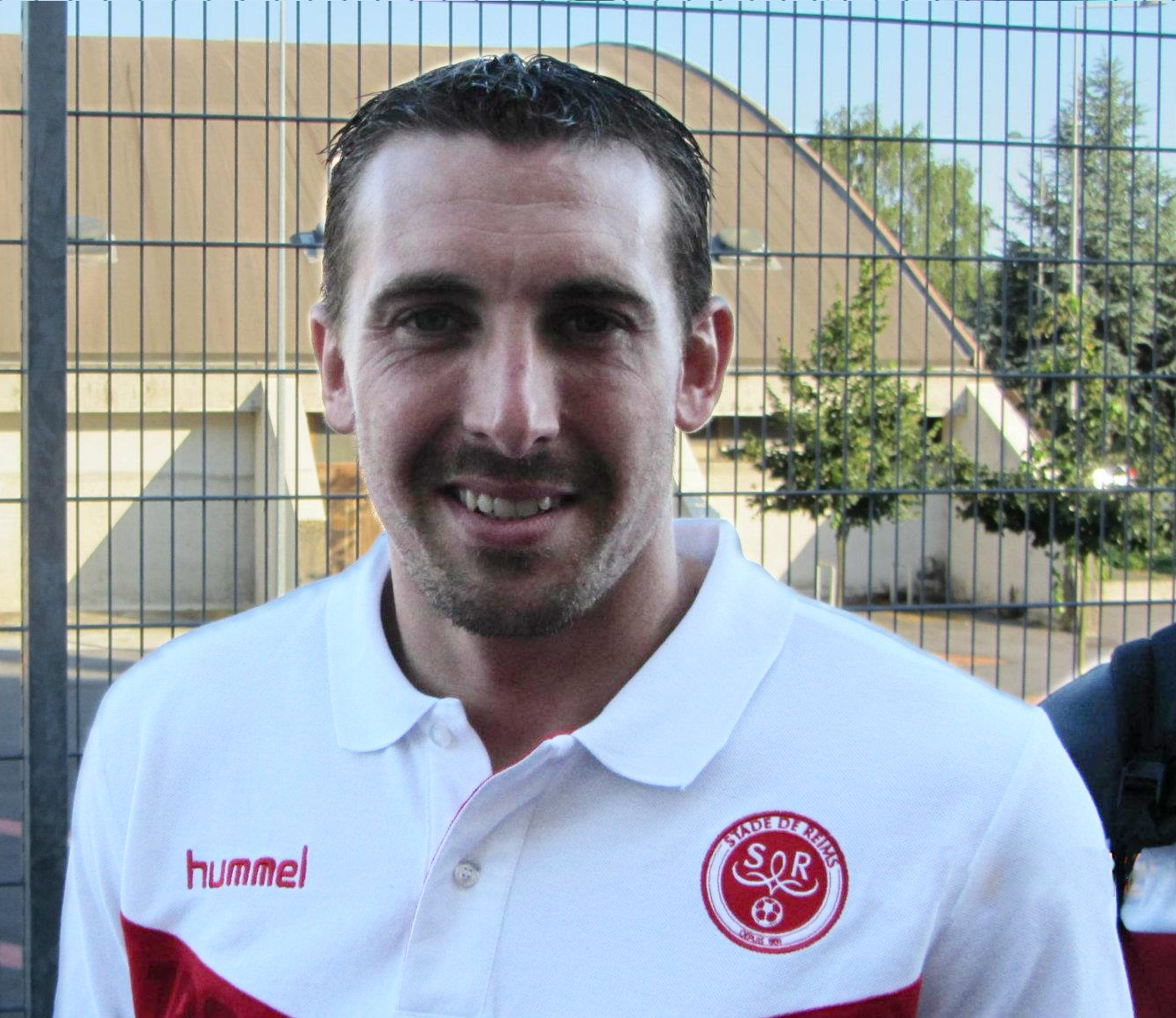

Personal information
- Date of birth: 5 November 1978 (age 48)
- Place of birth: Tours, France
- Height: 1.83 m (6 ft 0 in)
- Position: Goalkeeper

Senior career*
Years	Team	Apps	(Gls)
1999–2000	Le Mans	0	(0)
2000–2004	Metz	3	(0)
2004–2006	FC Gueugnon	63	(0)
2006–2013	Stade de Reims	91	(0)
2013–2014	CS Louhans-Cuiseaux	12	(0)
- * Club domestic league appearances and goals as of 30 June 2013

Johan Liébus (born 5 November 1978) is a French professional football player who plays as a goalkeeper for Louhans-Cuiseaux.

He played on the professional level in Division 1 for Metz, and in Ligue 2 for Gueugnon and Reims.
