= Patricio D'Amico =

Argentine association football player

Personal information
- Full name: Patricio Martín D'Amico
- Date of birth: 10 February 1975 (age 51)
- Place of birth: Buenos Aires, Argentina
- Height: 1.79 m (5 ft 10 in)
- Position: Midfielder

Senior career*
Years	Team	Apps	(Gls)
–1997	All Boys	69	(20)
1997	Racing	13	(0)
1998	Quilmes	9	(3)
1998–1999	Badajoz	8	(0)
1999	Belgrano (Córdoba)	2	(0)
2000–2003	Metz	33	(1)
2001–2002	→ Wasquehal (loan)	26	(6)
2003–2005	Châteauroux	33	(1)
2005–2008	Legnano	81	(1)
2008–2010	Pavia	57	(3)
2010–2012	Vogherese		

Managerial career
- 2012–2015: Deportivo Maldonado
- 2016–2018: Accademia Pavese
- 2018–2019: Pavia
- 2019: River Plate (Asunción) (assistant)
- 2021–2022: Marseille (analyst)
- * Club domestic league appearances and goals

Patricio Martín D'Amico (born 10 February 1975) is an Argentine football manager who is analyst of Marseille.

== Career ==
=== Playing career ===
D'Amico started his career with Argentine second division side All Boys, where he made 69 league appearances and scored 20 goals. In 1997, D'Amico signed for Racing in the Argentine top flight. Before the second half of 1997–98, he signed for Argentine second division club Quilmes. In 1998, he signed for Badajoz in the Spanish second division. In 1999, D'Amico signed for Argentine team Belgrano (Córdoba). In 2000, he signed for Metz in the French Ligue 1.

In 2003, he signed for French second division outfit Châteauroux, helping them qualify for the 2004–05 UEFA Cup and reach the final of the 2003–04 Coupe de France. In 2008, D'Amico signed for Pavia in the Italian third division, becoming the first foreign captain in their history. In 2010, he signed for Italian fourth division side Vogherese.

=== Managerial career ===
In 2012, he was appointed manager of Deportivo Maldonado in Uruguay. In 2016, D'Amico was appointed manager of Italian fifth division club Accademia Pavese. In 2018, he was appointed manager of Pavia in the Italian fourth division. In 2019, he was appointed assistant manager of Paraguayan club River Plate (Asunción). In 2021, D'Amico was appointed analyst of Marseille in the French Ligue 1.

== Personal life ==
He is the twin brother of former footballer Fernando D'Amico.
