= Grégory Proment =

French footballer (born 1978)

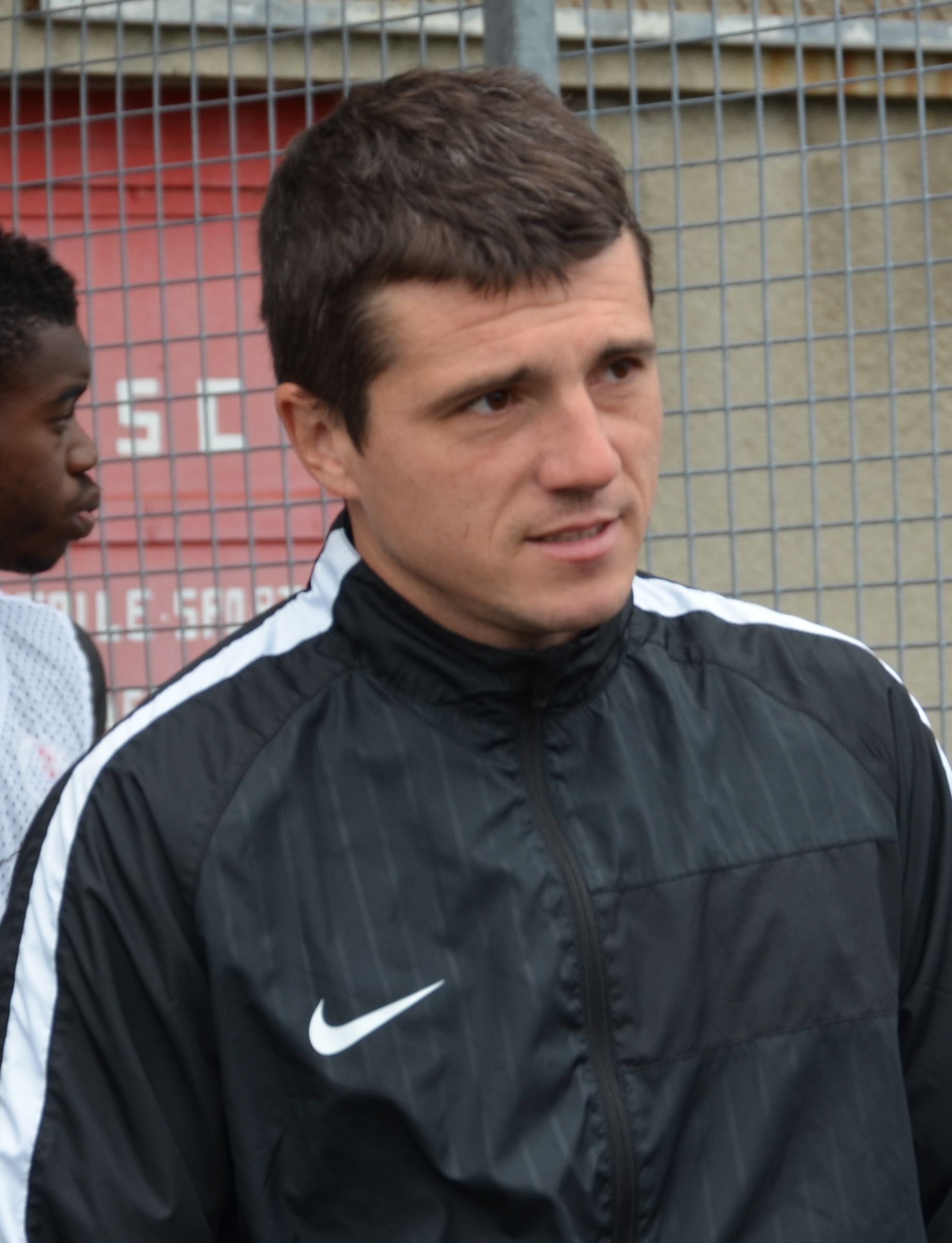
- Proment in 2015

Personal information
- Full name: Grégory Proment
- Date of birth: 10 December 1978 (age 47)
- Place of birth: Cormeilles-en-Parisis, Val-d'Oise, France
- Height: 1.76 m (5 ft 9 in)
- Position: Midfielder

Team information
- Current team: Metz (manager)

Youth career
- Metz

Senior career*
Years	Team	Apps	(Gls)
1997–2006	Metz	261	(23)
2006–2010	Caen	132	(2)
2010	Antalyaspor	10	(0)
2011–2012	Caen	43	(2)
2012–2013	Metz	33	(2)
Total		479	(29)

International career
1998	France U21	5	(0)

Managerial career
- 2013–2018: Caen B
- 2018–2021: Metz B
- 2023–2024: Seraing
- 2024–2025: Clermont B
- 2025: Clermont (caretaker)
- 2025–2026: Clermont
- 2026–: Metz
- * Club domestic league appearances and goals

Grégory Proment (born 10 December 1978) is a French professional football manager and a former player who played as a midfielder for FC Metz, Stade Malherbe Caen, and Antalyaspor. He currently managed Metz.

== Club career ==
Born in Cormeilles-en-Parisis, Val-d'Oise, Proment spent most of his career playing for FC Metz, making 261 appearances in six seasons, and Stade Malherbe Caen. After winning promotion from Ligue 2 with SM Caen, Proment signed a three-year deal with Antalyaspor in June 2010. However, he left the club after making only eight league appearances in January 2011.

== International career ==
Proment won the 1997 UEFA European Under-18 Championship with France.

== Coaching career ==
In June 2023, Proment was appointed head coach of Belgian club Seraing, recently relegated from Belgian Pro League. Proment previously worked at the club as an assistant coach.

On 20 June 2025, Proment was hired by Clermont to manage their reserve squad in the fifth-tier Championnat National 3.

On 29 September 2026, Proment was appointed manager of former playing club Metz.
