= Jonathan Jäger =

French footballer (born 1978)

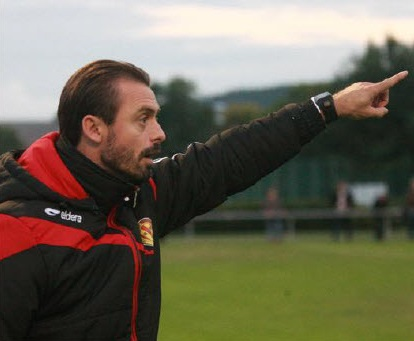
- Jäger in 2016

Personal information
- Date of birth: 23 May 1978 (age 48)
- Place of birth: Metz, France
- Height: 1.72 m (5 ft 8 in)
- Position: Striker

Youth career
- Ban-St.Martin
- –1996: Metz

Senior career*
Years	Team	Apps	(Gls)
1996–2004	Metz	125	(33)
1999–2000	→ Louhans-Cuiseaux (loan)	25	(13)
2004–2006	Le Havre	36	(5)
2006–2007	FC Saarbrücken	34	(17)
2007–2011	SC Freiburg	82	(10)
2011–2013	F91 Dudelange	13	(4)
2013–2014	CSO Amnéville	35	(8)
Total		350	(90)
- * Club domestic league appearances and goals

Jonathan Jäger (born 23 May 1978) is a French former professional footballer who played as a striker.

== Career ==
Jäger joined Freiburg from 1. FC Saarbrücken in 2007, after finishing as joint top-scorer in the Regionalliga Süd (III) for the season.
