= 2014–15 SC Bastia season =

Sporting Club de Bastia
2014–15 season
- Chairman: Pierre-Marie Geronimi
- Manager: Claude Makélélé(until 3 November); Ghislain Printant (from 27 November)
- Stadium: Stade Armand Cesari
- Ligue 1: 12th
- Coupe de France: Round of 32 vs. Quevilly
- Coupe de la Ligue: Final vs. Paris Saint-Germain
- Top goalscorer: League: Floyd Ayité (6); All: Floyd Ayité (9)
- Highest home attendance: 15,534 vs Marseille (9 August 2014)
- Lowest home attendance: 3,034 vs Caen (13 January 2015)
- Average home league attendance: 12,802
| Home colours | Away colours | Third colours |

The 2014–15 SC Bastia season was the 49th consecutive season of the club in the French professional leagues. The club competed in Ligue 1, the Coupe de la Ligue and the Coupe de France.

Bastia started the season with Claude Makélélé as manager, as a replacement for departing Frédéric Hantz, with Didier Tholot as an assistant coach. However, after suffering a new Ligue 1 defeat against Guingamp in November, Makelele was sacked and replaced by Ghislain Printant, former head coach of Bastia's youth academy.

== Squad and statistics ==
As of 7 February 2015, after Ligue 1 game against Metz

| No. | Pos | Nat | Player | Total | | Ligue 1 | | Coupe de France | | Coupe de la Ligue | |
| No. | Pos | Nat | Player | Apps | Goals | Apps | Goals | Apps | Goals | Apps | Goals |
Goalkeepers
| 1 | GK | (France) FRA | Alphonse Areola | 25 | 0 | 22 | 0 | 1 | 0 | 2 | 0 |
| 16 | GK | (France) FRA | Jean-Louis Leca | 4 | 0 | 2 | 0 | 0 | 0 | 2 | 0 |
| 30 | GK | (France) FRA | Thomas Vincensini | 1 | 0 | 0 | 0 | 1 | 0 | 0 | 0 |
Defenders
| 2 | DF | (France) FRA | Romain Achilli | 1 | 0 | 0 | 0 | 1 | 0 | 0 | 0 |
| 4 | DF | (France) FRA | Florian Marange | 16 | 0 | 8+2 | 0 | 2 | 0 | 3+1 | 0 |
| 5 | DF | (France) FRA | Sébastien Squillaci | 23 | 1 | 20 | 0 | 1 | 0 | 2 | 1 |
| 15 | DF | (France) FRA | Julian Palmieri | 26 | 2 | 23 | 2 | 0 | 0 | 3 | 0 |
| 17 | DF | (France) FRA | Mathieu Peybernes | 22 | 0 | 15+4 | 0 | 1+1 | 0 | 1 | 0 |
| 20 | DF | (France) FRA | François Modesto | 20 | 2 | 12+4 | 2 | 1 | 0 | 3 | 0 |
| 23 | DF | (Mali) MLI | Drissa Diakité | 15 | 0 | 13 | 0 | 0 | 0 | 2 | 0 |
| 29 | DF | (France) FRA | Gilles Cioni | 8 | 0 | 5 | 0 | 1 | 0 | 1+1 | 0 |
| — | DF | (France) FRA | Alexander Djiku | 4 | 0 | 1 | 0 | 1 | 0 | 2 | 0 |
Midfielders
| 6 | MF | (Ivory Coast) CIV | Romaric | 23 | 0 | 11+7 | 0 | 1 | 0 | 3+1 | 0 |
| 8 | MF | (France) FRA | El Hadji Ba | 7 | 0 | 7 | 0 | 0 | 0 | 0 | 0 |
| 10 | MF | (Algeria) ALG | Ryad Boudebouz | 26 | 5 | 22+1 | 5 | 1 | 0 | 2 | 0 |
| 12 | MF | (France) FRA | Christophe Vincent | 4 | 0 | 0 | 0 | 1+1 | 0 | 2 | 0 |
| 13 | MF | (Mali) MLI | Abdoulaye Keita | 6 | 0 | 1+2 | 0 | 2 | 0 | 1 | 0 |
| 18 | MF | (France) FRA | Yannick Cahuzac | 17 | 1 | 15 | 1 | 0 | 0 | 2 | 0 |
| 21 | MF | (Georgia (country)) GEO | Luka Kikabidze | 1 | 0 | 0 | 0 | 0+1 | 0 | 0 | 0 |
| 22 | MF | (France) FRA | Christopher Maboulou | 19 | 3 | 13+3 | 3 | 1 | 0 | 2 | 0 |
| 24 | MF | (France) FRA | Lyes Houri | 0 | 0 | 0 | 0 | 0 | 0 | 0 | 0 |
| 27 | MF | (Belgium) BEL | Guillaume Gillet | 29 | 2 | 24 | 1 | 1 | 0 | 4 | 1 |
| 28 | MF | (France) FRA | Gaël Danic | 2 | 0 | 1 | 0 | 0 | 0 | 1 | 0 |
| — | MF | (France) FRA | Julien Benhaim | 1 | 0 | 0 | 0 | 1 | 0 | 0 | 0 |
| — | MF | (France) FRA | Julien Romain | 1 | 0 | 0+1 | 0 | 0 | 0 | 0 | 0 |
Forwards
| 3 | FW | (France) FRA | Hervin Ongenda | 18 | 0 | 6+9 | 0 | 0 | 0 | 2+1 | 0 |
| 7 | FW | (Togo) TOG | Floyd Ayité | 20 | 5 | 16+2 | 2 | 1 | 2 | 1 | 1 |
| 9 | FW | (France) FRA | Djibril Cissé | 10 | 4 | 0+6 | 0 | 1 | 1 | 1+2 | 3 |
| 11 | FW | (Ivory Coast) CIV | Junior Tallo | 14 | 4 | 9+4 | 4 | 1 | 0 | 0 | 0 |
| 14 | FW | (Mali) MLI | Famoussa Koné | 8 | 1 | 2+2 | 0 | 1+1 | 0 | 0+2 | 1 |
| 19 | FW | (Ivory Coast) CIV | Giovanni Sio | 2 | 0 | 1 | 0 | 0 | 0 | 1 | 0 |
| 25 | FW | (Guinea) GUI | François Kamano | 15 | 2 | 11+2 | 2 | 0 | 0 | 1+1 | 0 |
| 26 | FW | (Brazil) BRA | Brandão | 2 | 0 | 2 | 0 | 0 | 0 | 0 | 0 |
| — | FW | (France) FRA | Christophe Ibayi | 1 | 0 | 0 | 0 | 0+1 | 0 | 0 | 0 |
Players who left during the season
| — | MF | (Colombia) COL | Joao Rodríguez | 6 | 0 | 0+5 | 0 | 0 | 0 | 0+1 | 0 |
| — | FW | (Belgium) BEL | Benjamin Mokulu | 5 | 1 | 0+4 | 0 | 0 | 0 | 0+1 | 1 |
| — | FW | (Colombia) COL | Juan Pablo Pino | 4 | 0 | 2+2 | 0 | 0 | 0 | 0 | 0 |

== Friendlies ==
| 11 July 2014 | Bastia | 0–0 | Gazélec Ajaccio | Stade Santos-Manfredi, Corte |
| | | Report | | Attendance: 1,300; Referee: Benoît Millot |

| 19 July 2014 | Evian Thonon Gaillard | 2–1 | Bastia | Stade Jacques Forestier, Aix-les-Bains |
| | N'Sikulu 62'; Koné 81' | Report | 36' Boudebouz | Attendance: 600; Referee: Hakim Ben El Hadj |

| 22 July 2014 | Clermont Foot | 0–0 | Bastia | Stade Jacques Forestier, Aix-les-Bains |
| | | Report | | Attendance: 300 |

| 25 July 2014 | Norwich City (England) | 1–1 | Bastia | Stade municipal de Sallanches, Sallanches |
| | Pilkington 85' | Report | 65' Kamano | Attendance: 500 |

| 2 August 2014 | Bastia | 1–0 | (Italy) Genoa | Stade Armand Cesari, Furiani |
| | Gillet 53' | Report | | Attendance: 5,000; Referee: Stéphane Jochem |

| 11 July 2014 | Bastia | 1–1 | Gazélec Ajaccio | Plaine de l'Igesa, Furiani |
| | Cissé 86' (pen.) | | 51' Boujedra |

== Competitions ==
=== Ligue 1 ===
==== League table ====
| Pos | Team | Pld | W | D | L | GF | GA | GD | Pts |
|---|---|---|---|---|---|---|---|---|---|
| 10 | Guingamp | 38 | 15 | 4 | 19 | 41 | 55 | −14 | 49 |
| 11 | Nice | 38 | 13 | 9 | 16 | 44 | 53 | −9 | 48 |
| 12 | Bastia | 38 | 12 | 11 | 15 | 37 | 46 | −9 | 47 |
| 13 | Caen | 38 | 12 | 10 | 16 | 54 | 55 | −1 | 46 |
| 14 | Nantes | 38 | 11 | 12 | 15 | 29 | 40 | −11 | 45 |

Source: Ligue 1
Rules for classification: 1) points; 2) goal difference; 3) number of goals scored

==== Results summary ====
| Overall | | | | | | | | Home | | | | | | Away | | | | | |
| Pld | W | D | L | GF | GA | GD | Pts | W | D | L | GF | GA | GD | W | D | L | GF | GA | GD |
|---|---|---|---|---|---|---|---|---|---|---|---|---|---|---|---|---|---|---|---|
| 38 | 12 | 11 | 15 | 37 | 46 | −9 | 47 | 8 | 7 | 4 | 24 | 18 | +6 | 4 | 4 | 11 | 13 | 28 | −15 |

Last updated: 23 May 2015.
Source: Competitive matches

==== Results by round ====
| Round | 1 | 2 | 3 | 4 | 5 | 6 | 7 | 8 | 9 | 10 | 11 | 12 | 13 | 14 | 15 | 16 | 17 | 18 | 19 | 20 | 21 | 22 | 23 | 24 | 25 | 26 | 27 | 28 | 29 | 30 | 31 | 32 | 33 | 34 | 35 | 36 | 37 | 38 |
|---|---|---|---|---|---|---|---|---|---|---|---|---|---|---|---|---|---|---|---|---|---|---|---|---|---|---|---|---|---|---|---|---|---|---|---|---|---|---|
| Ground | H | A | H | A | H | A | H | A | H | A | H | A | H | H | A | H | A | H | A | H | A | H | A | H | A | H | A | H | A | H | A | A | H | A | H | A | H | A |
| Result | D | L | W | D | D | L | D | L | L | W | L | L | W | D | L | L | L | W | D | W | D | D | D | W | W | W | L | W | L | D | L | L | L | W | W | W | D | L |
| Position | 9 | 17 | 11 | 13 | 14 | 18 | 16 | 16 | 19 | 16 | 18 | 19 | 15 | 15 | 19 | 20 | 20 | 18 | 19 | 14 | 15 | 14 | 16 | 15 | 13 | 10 | 14 | 10 | 12 | 13 | 13 | 13 | 14 | 12 | 12 | 11 | 11 | 12 |

Source: Ligue 1
A = Away; H = Home; W = Win; D = Draw; L = Loss

==== Matches ====
Win Draw Loss

| 9 August 2014 1 | Bastia | 3–3 | Marseille | Furiani |
| 21:00 CEST | Maboulou 9', 73'; Palmieri (yellow card) 19'; Tallo 66' (pen.); Brandão (yellow card) 82'; Ayité (yellow card) 87' | Report | 11', 62' (pen.) Gignac; 17' (o.g.) Romaric; (yellow card) 64' Mendy | Stadium: Stade Armand Cesari; Attendance: 15,534; Referee: Lionel Jaffredo |

| 16 August 2014 2 | Paris Saint-Germain | 2–0 | Bastia | Paris |
| 17:00 CEST | Lucas 26'; Motta (yellow card) 54'; Cavani 57' | Report | (yellow card) 31' Brandão; (yellow card) 54' Ayité; (yellow card) 64' Romaric | Stadium: Parc des Princes; Attendance: 45,258; Referee: Amaury Delerue |

| 23 August 2014 3 | Bastia | 1–0 | Toulouse | Furiani |
| 20:00 CEST | Boudebouz 24' (pen.); Ba (yellow card) 35'; Romaric (yellow card) 70'; Tallo (yellow card) 76' | Report | (yellow card) 23' Moubandje | Stadium: Stade Armand Cesari; Attendance: 13,797; Referee: Sébastien Moreira |

| 31 August 2014 4 | Bordeaux | 1–1 | Bastia | Bordeaux |
| 14:00 CEST | Rolán 78' | Report | (yellow card) 5' Palmieri; 18', (yellow card) 73' Tallo; (yellow card) 42' Ba | Stadium: Stade Chaban-Delmas; Attendance: 21,917; Referee: Fredy Fautrel |

| 13 September 2014 5 | Bastia | 1–1 | Lens | Furiani |
| 20:00 CEST | Gillet (yellow card) 47', (goal) 54' | Report | 40' Chavarría; (yellow card) 72' El Jadeyaoui; (yellow card) 77' Lemoigne | Stadium: Stade Armand Cesari; Attendance: 12,474; Referee: Wilfried Bien |

| 20 September 2014 6 | Metz | 3–1 | Bastia | Metz |
| 20:00 CEST | Métanire (yellow card) 7'; Krivets 14'; Milán 64'; Falcón 74' | Report | 42' Ayité; (yellow card) 81' Modesto | Stadium: Stade Saint-Symphorien; Attendance: 18,605; Referee: Sébastien Desiage |

| 24 September 2014 7 | Bastia | 0–0 | Nantes | Furiani |
| 19:00 CEST | Peybernes (yellow card) 18'; Cahuzac (red card) 40'; Squillaci (yellow card) 48' | Report | (yellow card) 21' Cissokho; (yellow card) 49' Djilobodji | Stadium: Stade Armand Cesari; Attendance: 11,380; Referee: Tony Chapron |

| 27 September 2014 8 | Lille | 1–0 | Bastia | Villeneuve-d'Ascq |
| 20:00 CEST | Béria (yellow card) 2'; Origi 39'; Souaré (yellow card) 50'; Traoré (yellow card) 90+3' | Report | (yellow card) 31' Gillet; (yellow card) 70' Ongenda; (yellow card) 83' Pino | Stadium: Stade Pierre-Mauroy; Attendance: 33,558; Referee: Bartolomeu Varela |

| 4 October 2014 9 | Bastia | 0–2 | Lorient | Furiani |
| 20:00 CEST | Squillaci (yellow card) 55' | Report | 48' (o.g.) Peybernes; (yellow card) 55' Ayew; 62', (yellow card) 64' Sunu | Stadium: Stade Armand Cesari; Attendance: 11,530; Referee: Stéphane Lannoy |

| 18 October 2014 10 | Nice | 0–1 | Bastia | Nice |
| 20:00 CEST | Amavi (yellow card) 38'; Bosetti (yellow card) 57'; Digard (yellow card) 71' | Report | (yellow card) 41' Diakité; 51' Ayité; (yellow card) 57' Boudebouz; (yellow card) 90+5' Rodríguez | Stadium: Allianz Riviera; Attendance: 18,919; Referee: Saïd Ennjimi |

| 25 October 2014 11 | Bastia | 1–3 | Monaco | Furiani |
| 20:00 CEST | Maboulou 22', (yellow card) 86'; Palmieri (yellow card) 36'; Diakité (yellow card) 90+1' | Report | 5' Germain; (yellow card) 38' Raggi; 78' Kondogbia; 84' Carrasco; (yellow card) 90+1' Bakayoko | Stadium: Stade Armand Cesari; Attendance: 13,106; Referee: Antony Gautier |

| 1 November 2014 12 | Guingamp | 1–0 | Bastia | Guingamp |
| 20:00 CET | Yatabaré 32', (yellow card) 45'; Mathis (yellow card) 40' | Report | (yellow card) 57' Cahuzac | Stadium: Stade de Roudourou; Attendance: 14,293; Referee: Wilfried Bien |

| 8 November 2014 13 | Bastia | 2–0 | Montpellier | Furiani |
| 20:00 CET | Tallo 21', 45+1', (yellow card) 60'; Palmieri (yellow card) 34' | Report | (yellow card) 37' Saihi; (yellow card) 37' Tiéné; (yellow card) 79' Sanson | Stadium: Stade Armand Cesari; Attendance: 11,556; Referee: Lionel Jaffredo |

| 22 November 2014 14 | Bastia | 0–0 | Lyon | Furiani |
| 17:00 CET | Kamano (yellow card) 32'; Palmieri (yellow card) 47'; Squillaci (yellow card) 50'; Modesto (yellow card) 67' | Report | (yellow card) 48' Biševac | Stadium: Stade Armand Cesari; Attendance: 12,349; Referee: Benoît Bastien |

| 29 November 2014 15 | Reims | 2–1 | Bastia | Reims |
| 20:00 CET | Ngog 10'; Moukandjo 85' | Report | 41' Modesto; (yellow card) 74' Peybernes | Stadium: Stade Auguste Delaune; Attendance: 13,304; Referee: Mikael Lesage |

| 3 December 2014 16 | Bastia | 1–2 | Evian | Furiani |
| 19:00 CET | Abdallah 35' (o.g.); Cahuzac (yellow card) 56'; Kamano (yellow card) 63'; Areola (yellow card) 89'; Palmieri (yellow card) 90' | Report | (yellow card) 4' Cambon; 65', (yellow card) 90' Wass; 83', (yellow card) 89' N'Sikulu | Stadium: Stade Armand Cesari; Attendance: 10,902; Referee: Bartolomeu Varela |

| 6 December 2014 17 | Saint-Étienne | 1–0 | Bastia | Saint-Étienne |
| 20:00 CET | van Wolfswinkel 58'; Sall (yellow card) 71' | Report | (yellow card) 46' Gillet | Stadium: Stade Geoffroy-Guichard; Attendance: 28,686; Referee: Nicolas Rainville |

| 13 December 2014 18 | Bastia | 2–0 | Rennes | Furiani |
| 20:00 CET | Squillaci (yellow card) 30'; Boudebouz 45+2'; Palmieri (yellow card) 56'; Cahuzac (yellow card) 61', (goal) 81' | Report | (yellow card) 20' Konradsen; (red card) 26' Diagne; (yellow card) 60' Ntep | Stadium: Stade Armand Cesari; Attendance: 11,121; Referee: Olivier Thual |

| 20 December 2014 19 | Caen | 1–1 | Bastia | Caen |
| 20:00 CET | Koita (yellow card) 49'; Féret 74' | Report | 21', (yellow card) 66' Kamano; (yellow card) 34' Marange; (yellow card) 88' Tallo | Stadium: Stade Michel d'Ornano; Attendance: 14,021; Referee: Benoît Millot |

| 10 January 2015 20 | Bastia | 4–2 | Paris Saint-Germain | Furiani |
| 17:00 CET | Boudebouz 32' (pen.), (yellow card) 47'; Modesto 45+2'; Palmieri 56', 89', (yellow card) 81'; Gillet (yellow card) 69' | Report | 10' Lucas; 20' Rabiot; (yellow card) 41' Luiz | Stadium: Stade Armand Cesari; Attendance: 13,028; Referee: Fredy Fautrel |

| 17 January 2015 21 | Toulouse | 1–1 | Bastia | Toulouse |
| 20:00 CET | Braithwaite 78'; Grigore (yellow card) 84' | Report | (yellow card) 47' Koné; 48' (o.g.) Ahamada | Stadium: Stadium Municipal; Attendance: 10,215; Referee: Frank Schneider |

| 24 January 2015 22 | Bastia | 0–0 | Bordeaux | Furiani |
| 20:00 CET | Leca (yellow card) 45'; Squillaci (yellow card) 45+1'; Cahuzac (yellow card) 54' (yellow-red card) 62' | Report | (yellow card) 45' Kiese Thelin; (yellow card) 87' Contento | Stadium: Stade Armand Cesari; Attendance: 11,571; Referee: Saïd Ennjimi |

| 31 January 2015 23 | Lens | 1–1 | Bastia | Amiens |
| 20:00 CET | Kantari 80' (pen.); Bourigeaud (yellow card) 87' | Report | 62' (pen.) Boudebouz; (yellow card) 79' Squillaci; (yellow card) 80' Romaric | Stadium: Stade de la Licorne; Attendance: 7,985; Referee: Alexandre Castro |

| 7 February 2015 24 | Bastia | 2–0 | Metz | Furiani |
| 20:00 CET | Modesto (yellow card) 44'; Kamano 66'; Boudebouz 79' (pen.) | Report | (yellow card) 2' N'Daw; (yellow card) 37' (yellow-red card) 49' Milán; (yellow card) 44' Palomino; (yellow card) 79' Marchal | Stadium: Stade Armand Cesari; Attendance: 11,399; Referee: Stéphane Lannoy |

| 14 February 2015 25 | Nantes | 0–2 | Bastia | Nantes |
| 20:00 CET | Djilobodji (yellow card) 36'; Aristeguieta (red card) 64'; Riou (yellow card) 67'; Deaux (yellow card) 79' | Report | 30', (yellow card) 49' Sio; (yellow card) 35' Squillaci; 75' Ayité | Stadium: Stade de la Beaujoire; Attendance: 19,789; Referee: Mikael Lesage |

| 21 February 2015 26 | Bastia | 2–1 | Lille | Furiani |
| 20:00 CET | Sio 22'; Ayité 40' | Report | 17' Mendes; (yellow card) 63' Corchia | Stadium: Stade Armand Cesari; Attendance: 11,621; Referee: Sébastien Desiage |

| 28 February 2015 27 | Lorient | 2–0 | Bastia | Lorient |
| 20:00 CET | Bellugou 16'; Abdullah (yellow card) 81'; Bruno 85' | Report | (yellow card) 42' Gillet | Stadium: Stade du Moustoir; Attendance: 13,619; Referee: Wilfried Bien |

| 7 March 2015 28 | Bastia | 2–1 | Nice | Furiani |
| 20:00 CET | Sio (yellow card) 3', (goal) 68'; Diakité (yellow card) 8'; Gillet 26'; Cahuzac (yellow card) 52' | Report | (yellow card) 14', (red card) 83' Diawara; 17' Carlos Eduardo; (yellow card) 27' Hult; (red card) 44' Puel; (yellow card) 77' Amavi | Stadium: Stade Armand Cesari; Attendance: 13,777; Referee: Fredy Fautrel |

| 13 March 2015 29 | Monaco | 3–0 | Bastia | Monaco |
| 20:30 CET | Martial 22', 51'; Matheus Carvalho 42' | Report | Diakité (red card) 32'; Sio (red card) 72' | Stadium: Stade Louis II; Attendance: 5,764; Referee: Ruddy Buquet |

| 21 March 2015 30 | Bastia | 0–0 | Guingamp | Fos-sur-Mer |
| 20:00 CET | Marange (yellow card) 30' | Report | (yellow card) 14' Sankharé | Stadium: Stade Parsemain; Referee: Stéphane Lannoy |

| 4 April 2015 31 | Montpellier | 3–1 | Bastia | Montpellier |
| 20:00 CEST | Barrios 69' (pen.); Mounier 72' (pen.); Marveaux (yellow card) 87'; Sanson 90+1' | Report | Sio 35'; Ayité (yellow card) 68'; Palmieri (yellow card) 70' | Stadium: Stade de la Mosson; Attendance: 11,349; Referee: (France) Alexandre Castro |

| 15 April 2015 32 | Lyon | 2–0 | Bastia | Lyon |
| 18:30 CEST | Koné (yellow card) 45+1'; Yattara 77'; Umtiti (yellow card) 80'; Lacazette 85' | Report | | Stadium: Stade de Gerland; Attendance: 36,549; Referee: (France) Lionel Jaffredo |

| 18 April 2015 33 | Bastia | 1–2 | Reims | Furiani |
| 20:00 CEST | Gillet (yellow card) 25'; Sio 47'; Cahuzac (yellow card) 54'; Peybernes (yellow card) 71' | Report | Ngog 5', (yellow card) 37'; Fofana (yellow card) 41'; Mandi 45+1'; Weber (yellow card) 49'; Roberge (yellow card) 69' de Préville (yellow card) 70' | Stadium: Stade Armand Cesari; Attendance: 15,452; Referee: (France) Benoît Millot |

| 25 April 2015 34 | Evian | 1–2 | Bastia | Annecy |
| 20:00 CEST | Sunu 42' | Report | Ayité (yellow card) 45+1'; Kamano 57', 87'; Boudebouz (yellow card) 61' | Stadium: Parc des Sports; Attendance: 8,521; Referee: (France) Sébastien Moreira |

| 2 May 2015 35 | Bastia | 1–0 | Saint-Étienne | Furiani |
| 20:00 CEST | Diakité (yellow card) 35'; Danic (yellow card) 58'; Palmieri (yellow card) 82'; Ayité 84'; Cioni (yellow card) 87' | Report | Hamouma (yellow card) 82' van Wolfswinkel (yellow card) 90+2' | Stadium: Stade Armand Cesari; Attendance: 14,944; Referee: (France) Stéphane Lannoy |

| 9 May 2015 36 | Rennes | 0–1 | Bastia | Rennes |
| 20:00 CEST | Doucouré (yellow card) 34'; Fernandes (yellow card) 35'; Ntep (yellow card) 61'; Prcić (yellow card) 74' | Report | Cahuzac (yellow card) 34'; Kamano (yellow card) 37' (yellow-red card); Danic 78', (yellow card) 86' | Stadium: Stade de la Route de Lorient; Attendance: 20,368; Referee: (France) Saïd Ennjimi |

| 16 May 2015 37 | Bastia | 1–1 | Caen | Furiani |
| 21:00 CEST | Ayité 12'; Cioni (yellow card) 27' | Report | Privat 10', (yellow card) 84' | Stadium: Stade Armand Cesari; Attendance: 14,902; Referee: (France) Alexandre Castro |

| 23 May 2015 38 | Marseille | 3–0 | Bastia | Marseille |
| 21:00 CEST | Payet 14'; Djiku 39' (o.g.); N'Koulou (yellow card) 76'; Ocampos 89' | Report | Diakité (yellow card) 34' | Stadium: Stade Vélodrome; Attendance: 59,533; Referee: (France) Ruddy Buquet |

=== Coupe de la Ligue ===
| 28 October 2014 Round of 32 | Bastia | 3–1 | Auxerre | Furiani |
| 20:00 | Boudebouz (yellow card) 31'; Ayité 58'; Cissé 64', 71' | Report | 13' Mbombo; (yellow card) 63' Diarra | Stadium: Stade Armand Cesari; Attendance: 4,381; Referee: Amaury Delerue |

| 16 December 2014 Round of 16 | Bastia | 3–2 (a.e.t.) | Caen | Furiani |
| 18:00 | Gillet 42'; Koné 89', (yellow card) 92'; Mokulu (yellow card) 90+3', (goal) 102' | Report | 12' Privat; 72' Saez; (yellow card) 90+2' Yahia; (yellow card) 103' Nangis; (yellow card) 104' Adéoti | Stadium: Stade Armand Cesari; Attendance: 3,034; Referee: Philippe Kalt |

| 13 January 2015 Quarter-finals | Bastia | 3–1 | Rennes | Furiani |
| 18:40 | Djiku (yellow card) 13'; Cahuzac (yellow card) 41'; Squillaci 46'; Danzé 71' (o.g.); Marange (yellow card) 73'; Cissé 90' | Report | 12' Armand; (yellow card) 48' (yellow-red card) 65' Konradsen; (red card) 76' Lenjani | Stadium: Stade Armand Cesari; Attendance: 4,836; Referee: Clément Turpin |

| 4 February 2015 Semi-finals | Monaco | 0–0 (a.e.t.) (6–7 p) | Bastia | Monaco |
| 21:00 | Fabinho (yellow card) 48'; Dirar (yellow card) 92' | Report | (yellow card) 92' Palmieri; (yellow card) 120' Romaric | Stadium: Stade Louis II; Attendance: 8,260; Referee: Antony Gautier |
| | Penalties |
| | Martial (penalty scored); Silva (penalty missed); Fabinho (penalty scored); Kurzawa (penalty scored); Moutinho (penalty missed); Toulalan (penalty scored); A. Traoré (penalty scored); Echiéjilé (penalty scored); Dirar (penalty missed) | | (penalty scored) Boudebouz; (penalty missed) Gillet; (penalty missed) Sio; (penalty scored) Modesto; (penalty scored) Palmieri; (penalty scored) Marange; (penalty scored) Ongenda; (penalty scored) Cioni; (penalty scored) Squillaci |

| 11 April 2015 Final | Bastia | 0–4 | Paris Saint-Germain | Saint-Denis |
| 21:00 CEST | Squillaci (red card) 19'; Cahuzac (yellow card) 24'; Peybernes (yellow card) 86'; Cioni (yellow card) 88' | Report | 21' (pen.), 41', 90+2' Ibrahimović; (yellow card) 43' Lavezzi; 80' Cavani | Stadium: Stade de France; Attendance: 72,000; Referee: Benoît Bastien |

=== Coupe de France ===
| 3 January 2015 Round of 64 | Bastia | 2–0 | Lille | Furiani |
| 20:45 | Ayité 5', 24' | Report | (yellow card) 52' Meïté; (yellow card) 81' Baša | Stadium: Stade Armand Cesari; Attendance: 4,916; Referee: Wilfried Bien |

| 20 January 2015 Round of 32 | Quevilly | 1–1 (a.e.t.) (3–1 p) | Bastia | Le Petit-Quevilly |
| 18:30 | Sarr 115' | Report | (yellow card) 70' Vincent; 106' Cissé | Stadium: Stade Robert Diochon; Attendance: 12,000; Referee: Ruddy Buquet |
| | Penalties |
| | Firmin (penalty missed); Ouahbi (penalty scored); Colinet (penalty scored); Beaugrard (penalty scored) | | (penalty missed) Romaric; (penalty missed) Djiku; (penalty scored) Vincent; (penalty missed) Peybernes |
