= 2015 Coupe de la Ligue final =

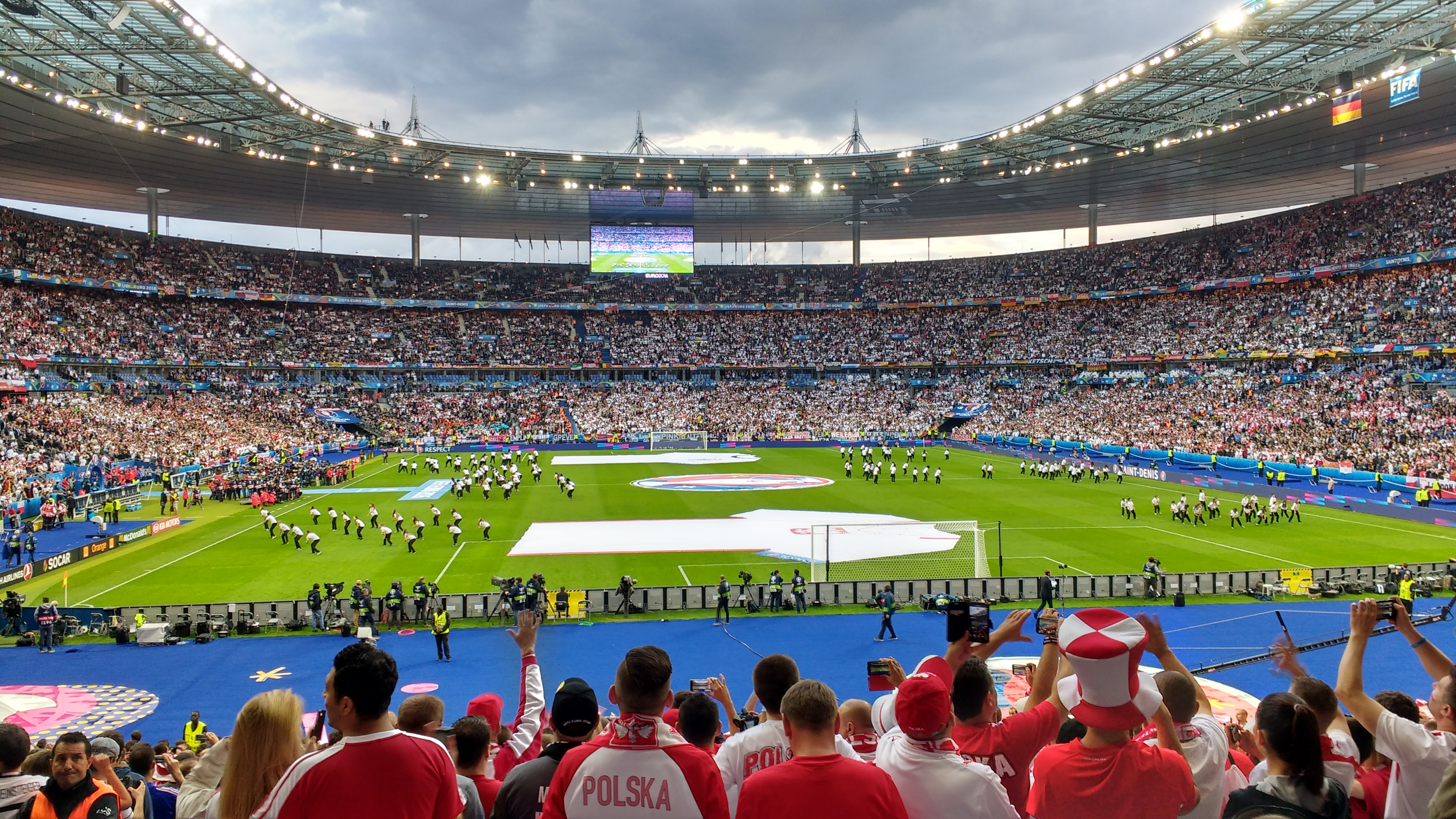
- Event: 2014–15 Coupe de la Ligue
Bastia	Paris Saint-Germain
Ligue 1	Ligue 1
0	4
- Date: 11 April 2015
- Venue: Stade de France, Saint-Denis
- Man of the Match: Zlatan Ibrahimović
- Referee: Benoit Bastien
- Attendance: 72,000

The 2015 Coupe de la Ligue final was the 21st final of France's football league cup competition, the Coupe de la Ligue, a competition for the 42 teams that the Ligue de Football Professionnel (LFP) manages. The final took place on 11 April 2015 at the Stade de France in Saint-Denis and was contested by reigning champions Paris Saint-Germain, and Bastia, the two teams who also contested the tournament's first ever final in 1995.

PSG won 4–0, with two goals in the first half by Zlatan Ibrahimović and a further two in the second by Edinson Cavani. As winners, they would have qualified for the third qualifying round of the 2015–16 UEFA Europa League, but qualified for the season's UEFA Champions League by winning Ligue 1 instead.

== Background ==
Paris Saint-Germain were the reigning champions, having won a record fourth title in the previous year's final with a 2–1 win over Lyon. It was PSG's sixth final — a joint record with Bordeaux — and they had previously won four (1995, 1998, 2008, 2014) and lost one (2000).

Bastia's only previous Coupe de la Ligue final was the inaugural edition in 1995. There, they lost 0–2 to PSG.

== Route to the final ==
Note: In all results below, the score of the finalist is given first (H: home; A: away).

Bastia		Round	Paris Saint-Germain	
Opponent	Result	2014–15 Coupe de la Ligue	Opponent	Result
Auxerre (H)	3–1	Third round	Bye	
Caen (H)	3–2 (a.e.t.)	Round of 16	Ajaccio (A)	3–1
Rennes (H)	3–1	Quarter-finals	Saint-Étienne (A)	1–0
Monaco (A)	0–0 (a.e.t.) (7–6 p)	Semi-finals	Lille (A)	1–0

=== Bastia ===
Bastia, as a Ligue 1 club not competing in Europe, entered the tournament in the third round with a home match against Ligue 2 AJ Auxerre at the Stade Armand Cesari on 28 October. They trailed at half time due to Yannis Mbombo's goal for the visitors, but eventually won 3–1 after an equaliser by Floyd Ayité and a brace from Djibril Cissé.

In the last 16, Bastia won 3–2 at home against top-flight Caen. Sloan Privat opened the scoring for the visitors, with Guillaume Gillet equalising before half time. In the second half José Saez put Caen back into the lead, and substitute Famoussa Koné equalised again for Bastia with a minute left. They advanced due to an extra-time goal from another substitute, Benjamin Mokulu.

Bastia were again the hosts in their quarter-final, a 3–1 win over Rennes. They conceded an early goal by Sylvain Armand, with Sebastian Squillaci equalising two minutes into the second half. Rennes captain Romain Danzé then scored an own goal to give Bastia the lead, and Cissé extended their advantage in added time. The Corsican club travelled for the first time in their semi-final on 5 February, to Monaco, where the game finished goalless after extra time at the Stade Louis II. In the penalty shootout, João Moutinho missed a chance to win the shootout after Giovanni Sio had his attempt saved by Maarten Stekelenburg. It went to sudden death, in which Nabil Dirar missed and Squillaci scored to put Bastia into the final.

=== Paris Saint-Germain ===
Paris Saint-Germain, due to competing in the UEFA Champions League, entered the tournament in the last 16 away to Ligue 2 club Ajaccio at the Stade François Coty. They were a goal down at half time, after Serge Aurier fouled Mouaad Madri for a penalty which Johan Cavalli converted past Nicolas Douchez. After the break, Edinson Cavani equalised, Aurier put PSG into the lead and Jean Christophe Bahebeck scored the final goal of a 3–1 win.

On 13 January 2015, away again in the quarter-finals, PSG defeated Ligue 1 club Saint-Étienne by a single goal from Zlatan Ibrahimović. The home team's fans did not believe that the ball had crossed the line, and threw objects onto the pitch, disrupting play for 10 minutes. PSG won away by a single goal again in the semi-final on 4 February, a strike from full-back Maxwell to defeat Lille.

== Match ==
11 April 2015
21:00 CEST

Bastia	0–4	Paris Saint-Germain
	Report	Ibrahimović 21' (pen.), 41'; Cavani 80', 90+2'

Stade de France, Saint-Denis
Attendance: 72,000
Referee: Benoît Bastien

Bastia	Paris Saint-Germain

SC BASTIA:
GK	1	(France) Alphonse Areola
RB	29	(France) Gilles Cioni	(yellow card) 88'
CB	20	(France) François Modesto
CB	5	(France) Sébastien Squillaci	(red card) 19'
LB	4	(France) Florian Marange
CM	18	(France) Yannick Cahuzac (c)	(yellow card) 24'
CM	27	(Belgium) Guillaume Gillet
RM	28	(France) Gaël Danic		(substituted off) 22'
CM	10	(Algeria) Ryad Boudebouz
LM	15	(France) Julian Palmieri		(substituted off) 68'
CF	19	(Ivory Coast) Giovanni Sio		(substituted off) 81'
Substitutes:
GK	16	(France) Jean-Louis Leca
DF	17	(France) Mathieu Peybernes	(yellow card) 86'	(substituted on) 22'
DF	23	(Mali) Drissa Diakité
MF	6	(Ivory Coast) Romaric
MF	7	(Togo) Floyd Ayité		(substituted on) 68'
MF	25	(Guinea) François Kamano
FW	26	(Brazil) Brandão		(substituted on) 81'
Manager:
(France) Ghislain Printant Assistant Referees: Fourth Official:

PARIS SAINT-GERMAIN FC:
GK	1	(France) Nicolas Douchez
RB	19	(Ivory Coast) Serge Aurier
CB	5	(Brazil) Marquinhos
CB	2	(Brazil) Thiago Silva (c)
LB	17	(Brazil) Maxwell
DM	24	(Italy) Marco Verratti
CM	14	(France) Blaise Matuidi
CM	25	(France) Adrien Rabiot		(substituted off) 77'
RW	22	(Argentina) Ezequiel Lavezzi	(yellow card) 43'	(substituted off) 63'
CF	10	(Sweden) Zlatan Ibrahimović
LW	27	(Argentina) Javier Pastore		(substituted off) 72'
Substitutes:
GK	30	(Italy) Salvatore Sirigu
DF	6	(France) Zoumana Camara
LB	21	(France) Lucas Digne
DF	23	(Netherlands) Gregory van der Wiel
MF	4	(France) Yohan Cabaye		(substituted on) 77'
FW	7	(Brazil) Lucas		(substituted on) 72'
FW	9	(Uruguay) Edinson Cavani		(substituted on) 63'
Manager:
(France) Laurent Blanc

Man of the Match:
Zlatan Ibrahimović (Paris Saint-Germain)

Assistant referees:
Frédéric Haquette
Laurent Stien
Fourth official:
Frank Schneider

Match rules

- 90 minutes.
- 30 minutes of extra-time if necessary.
- Penalty shoot-out if scores still level.
- Seven named substitutes.
- Maximum of three substitutions.

== See also ==
- 2015 Coupe de France final
- 2014–15 SC Bastia season
- 2014–15 Paris Saint-Germain FC season
