= 2013–14 SC Bastia season =

Sporting Club de Bastia
2013–14 season
- Chairman: Pierre-Marie Geronimi
- Manager: Frédéric Hantz
- Stadium: Stade Armand Cesari
- Ligue 1: 10th
- Coupe de France: Round of 32 (vs. Lens)
- Coupe de la Ligue: Round of 16 (vs. Evian)
- Top goalscorer: League: Gianni Bruno (8); All: Gianni Bruno (8)
Home colours	Away colours

The 2013–14 season is French football club SC Bastia's 108th professional season, their 48th consecutive season in French top-flight, and their 31st consecutive season in Ligue 1. Bastia is president by Pierre-Marie Geronimi, managed by Frédéric Hantz, and captained by Yannick Cahuzac for the season.

== Transfers ==
=== In ===
Pos.	Name	Fee	From
Summer
Defender	(Mali) Drissa Diakité	Free	(Greece) Olympiacos
Defender	(France) François Modesto	Free	(Greece) Olympiacos
Forward	(France) Florian Raspentino	Loan	(France) Marseille
Forward	(France) Ludovic Genest	Loan return	(France) Istres
Defender	(France) Florent André	Loan return	(France) Fréjus Saint-Raphaël
Forward	(Romania) Claudiu Keserü	Free	(France) Angers
Forward	(Belgium) Gianni Bruno	Loan	(France) Lille
Forward	(Mauritania) Adama Ba	Free	(France) Brest
Defender	(France) Sébastien Squillaci	Free	(England) Arsenal
Goalkeeper	(France) Jean-Louis Leca	Exchange	(France) Valenciennes
Midfielder	(Ivory Coast) Romaric	Free	(Spain) Real Zaragoza
Winter

=== Out ===
Pos.	Name	Fee	To
Summer
Forward	(France) Anthony Modeste	Loan return	(France) Bordeaux
Forward	(France) Florian Thauvin	Loan return	(France) Lille
Defender	(Ghana) Samuel Inkoom	Loan return	(Ukraine) Dnipro Dnipropetrovsk
Midfielder	(France) Claudio Beauvue	Loan return	(France) Châteauroux
Forward	(France) Yassin El-Azzouzi	Retired	Retired
Defender	(France) Gaël Angoula	Free	(France) Angers
Defender	(Senegal) Jacques Faty	Free	(China) Wuhan Zall
Goalkeeper	(France) Landry Bonnefoi	Free	(France) Châteauroux
Defender	(France) Olivier Vannucci	Free	(France) Gazélec Ajaccio
Midfielder	(France) Christophe Vincent	Loan	(France) CA Bastia
Midfielder	(France) Jérôme Rothen	Free	(France) Caen
Defender	(France) Sylvain Marchal	Free	(France) Metz
Goalkeeper	(Brazil) Macedo Novaes	Exchange	(France) Valenciennes
Defender	(France) Jérémy Choplin	Free	(France) Metz
Winter

== Squad and statistics ==
As of 17 May 2014

No.	Pos	Nat	Player	Total		Ligue 1		Coupe de France		Coupe de la Ligue	
No.	Pos	Nat	Player	Apps	Goals	Apps	Goals	Apps	Goals	Apps	Goals
Goalkeepers
1	GK	(France) FRA	Mickaël Landreau	33	0	31	0	1	0	1	0
16	GK	(France) FRA	Jean-Louis Leca	11	0	7+2	0	1	0	1	0
30	GK	(France) FRA	Thomas Vincensini	0	0	0	0	0	0	0	0
Defenders
5	DF	(France) FRA	Sébastien Squillaci	33	3	31	3	1	0	0+1	0
15	DF	(France) FRA	Julian Palmieri	31	0	26+2	0	1+1	0	1	0
20	DF	(France) FRA	François Modesto	36	2	33+1	2	1	0	1	0
21	DF	(Algeria) ALG	Féthi Harek	28	0	20+4	0	2	0	2	0
23	DF	(Mali) MLI	Drissa Diakité	33	0	30+1	0	2	0	0	0
29	DF	(France) FRA	Gilles Cioni	11	0	8+1	0	0	0	2	0
	DF	(France) FRA	Romain Achilli	3	0	2	0	0	0	1	0
	DF	(France) FRA	Alexander Djiku	1	0	0	0	0	0	0+1	0
Midfielders
6	MF	(Ivory Coast) CIV	Romaric	38	4	32+2	4	2	0	2	0
7	MF	(Serbia) SRB	Miloš Krasić	21	2	12+6	2	1	0	2	0
10	MF	(Tunisia) TUN	Wahbi Khazri	34	7	25+7	6	1	1	1	0
13	MF	(Algeria) ALG	Ryad Boudebouz	34	3	26+5	3	2	0	0+1	0
18	MF	(France) FRA	Yannick Cahuzac	32	0	29	0	2	0	1	0
22	MF	(Mali) MLI	Sambou Yatabaré	16	1	14+2	1	0	0	0	0
27	MF	(France) FRA	Julien Sablé	25	0	14+9	0	0	0	2	0
	MF	(Mali) MLI	Abdoulaye Keita	5	0	1+4	0	0	0	0	0
Forwards
8	FW	(France) FRA	Toifilou Maoulida	9	0	2+4	0	0+1	0	1+1	0
9	FW	(Belgium) BEL	Gianni Bruno	33	8	20+11	8	1+1	0	0	0
12	FW	(France) FRA	Djibril Cissé	15	2	10+5	2	0	0	0	0
17	FW	(France) FRA	Florian Raspentino	24	6	15+7	5	2	1	0	0
19	FW	(Mauritania) MTN	Adama Ba	13	3	6+6	3	0	0	1	0
28	FW	(Brazil) BRA	Ilan	33	3	14+16	1	1	0	2	2
	FW	(France) FRA	Joseph Barbato	5	0	1+3	0	0+1	0	0	0
	FW	(France) FRA	Joris Correa	1	0	0+1	0	0	0	0	0
Players who appeared for Bastia no longer at the club
11	FW	(Romania) ROU	Claudiu Keserü	18	1	7+9	1	0	0	1+1	0
14	FW	(France) FRA	Ludovic Genest	4	1	1+1	1	0+1	0	0+1	0

== Club ==
=== Coaching staff ===
Position	Staff
Coach	Frédéric Hantz
Assistant Coaches	Réginald Ray; Frédéric Née
Goalkeeping Coach	Hervé Sekli
Physical Trainer	Didier Bouillot

Source: SC Bastia

=== Board ===
Position	Staff
President	Pierre-Marie Geronimi
Assistants	Jean-Noël Filippi; Joseph Franceschini; Yves Pianelli; Alain Seghi; Jean-Louis Carlotti; Mathieu Cesari; Thierry Battistelli; René-Paul Salducci

Source: SC Bastia

== Kit ==
Supplier: Kappa
Sponsor(s): Oscaro, Corsica Ferries, Invicta, Haute-Corse General Council, Collectivité Territoriale de Corse, and Technitoit

Home	Away

Source: kappa.fr

== Pre-season ==
Bastia, after a month of holiday blues have gone back to training and more specifically the Igesa this on July 2. For several weeks, they will submit a program that is both intense and varied, while chaining the preparatory meetings.

Leave ends for island players. For the fourth season, they find Frédéric Hantz and his staff for the preparation of pre-season, and therefore from that Tuesday afternoon on the side of Stade Armand Cesari for the delivery of equipment prior to the first session to Igesa. Once is not custom, no less than four players have already joined the club before himself resumed workouts. Drissa Diakité, François Modesto, Florian Raspentino and Claudiu Keserü indeed discover their teammates and especially Mickaël Landreau who has just re-enlist for a season with the club. If other arrivals will of course take place in the days and weeks ahead, Frédéric Hantz still have a group rather provided to start the preparation as it should be, despite the departures Florian Thauvin (Lille), Anthony Modeste (Bordeaux) and Jérôme Rothen this morning.

All these people will have six weeks to prepare for the resumption of the competition will be on the side of the Beaujoire on August 10. Meanwhile, two courses will be provided on the side of Vezzani and Combloux (Haute-Savoie), and several new friends, including the latest on August 3, against an opponent that will be announced very soon.

=== Matches ===
12 July 2013	Bastia	5–3	Gazélec Ajaccio	Vezzani, France
18:00 (UTC+1)	Bruno 3', 41'; Genest 44'; Ba 81'; Khazri 87'	Report	45', 61' N’Kouloukou; 68' Libbra	Stadium: Stade Joseph Chiarelli; Attendance: 900; Referee: Floris Aubin; Assistant referees: Stéphan Luzi; Gwenael Pasqualotti

17 July 2013	Bastia	1–2	CA Bastia	Bastia, France
19:00 (UTC+1)	Maoulida 58' (pen.)	Report	1' Pastorelli; 28' A. N'Diaye	Stadium: Stade Armand Cesari; Attendance: 3,200; Referee: Benoît Millot; Assistant referees: Stéphan Luzi; Decoster

20 July 2013	Evian	0–2	Bastia	Sallanches, France
		Report	57' Genest; 69' Choplin	Stadium: Stade Municipal de Sallanches; Attendance: 2,500; Referee: Alexandre Castro

26 July 2013	(Germany) Mainz 05	3–1	Bastia	Sallanches, France
19:00 (UTC+1)	Müller 17'; Polter 65'; Parker 82'	Report	57' Diakité	Stadium: Stade d’Evian-les-bains; Referee: Karim Ben El Hadj

3 August 2013	Bastia	0–0	Getafe (Spain)	Bastia, France
	Khazri (penalty missed) 23'; Palmieri (yellow card) 42'	Report	(yellow card) 53' M. Madera; (yellow card) 66' Garcia	Stadium: Stade Armand Cesari; Attendance: 5,000; Referee: Wilfried Bien

== Competitions ==
=== Ligue 1 ===
==== League table ====
Pos	Team	Pld	W	D	L	GF	GA	GD	Pts
8	Lorient	38	13	10	15	48	53	−5	49
9	Toulouse	38	12	13	13	46	53	−7	49
10	Bastia	38	13	10	15	42	56	−14	49
11	Reims	38	12	12	14	44	52	−8	48
12	Rennes	38	11	13	14	47	45	+2	46

Source: Ligue 1
Rules for classification: 1) Points; 2) Goal difference; 3) Number of goals scored

==== Results summary ====
Overall								Home						Away					
Pld	W	D	L	GF	GA	GD	Pts	W	D	L	GF	GA	GD	W	D	L	GF	GA	GD
38	12	10	16	42	58	−16	46	10	5	4	24	18	+6	2	5	12	18	40	−22

Last updated: 17 May 2014.
Source: lfp.fr

==== Results by round ====
Round	1	2	3	4	5	6	7	8	9	10	11	12	13	14	15	16	17	18	19	20	21	22	23	24	25	26	27	28	29	30	31	32	33	34	35	36	37	38
Ground	A	H	A	H	A	H	A	A	H	A	H	A	H	A	H	A	H	A	H	A	H	A	H	A	H	H	A	H	A	H	A	H	A	H	A	H	A	H
Result	L	W	L	W	D	D	L	D	W	L	W	L	W	D	W	D	L	L	D	L	W	W	L	W	L	L	D	L	L	W	L	D	L	W	L	D	W	D
Position	18	10	10	10	10	10	10	10	10	10	10	10	10	10	10	10	13	13	13	13	11	11	12	10	10	10	10	10	10	10	10	10	12	12	12	12	10	10

Source: lfp.fr
A = Away; H = Home; W = Win; D = Draw; L = Loss

===== Matches =====
Win Draw Loss

10 August 2013 1	Nantes	2–0	Bastia	Nantes
21:00	Veretout (yellow card) 7' (yellow-red card) 76'; Đorđević 23'; Aristeguieta (yellow card) 86'; Palmieri 90+1' (o.g.)	Report	(yellow card) 11' Cahuzac; (yellow card) 25' Yatabaré; (yellow card) 45+1' Raspentino; (red card) 70' Ilan	Stadium: Stade de la Beaujoire; Attendance: 24,727; Referee: Clément Turpin
Note: Victory was awarded to Bastia after Nantes fielded suspended player Abdoulaye Touré. Bastia gained the three points, and Nantes' goals were cancelled.

17 August 2013 2	Bastia	2–0	Valenciennes	Furiani
20:00	Diakité (yellow card) 35'; Yatabaré (yellow card) 58'; Bruno 76'; Ba 79'	Report	(yellow card) 34' Ducourtioux; (yellow card) 69' Lala	Stadium: Stade Armand Cesari; Attendance: 15,412; Referee: Benoît Bastien

24 August 2013 3	Bordeaux	1–0	Bastia	Bordeaux
20:00	Saivet 32'; Carlos Henrique (yellow card) 52'; Diabaté (yellow card) 80'	Report	(yellow card) 52' Palmieri; (yellow card) 88' Yatabaré	Stadium: Stade Chaban-Delmas; Attendance: 15,240; Referee: Wilfried Bien

31 August 2013 4	Bastia	2–1	Toulouse	Furiani
20:00	Khazri (yellow card) 19'; Palmieri (red card) 37'; Keserü 43'; Diakité (yellow card) 62'; Romaric 67'	Report	(yellow card) 33' Aurier; (yellow card) 45' Aguilar; 57' Braithwaite; (yellow card) 65' Spajić; (yellow card) 71' Chantôme	Stadium: Stade Armand Cesari; Attendance: 13,669; Referee: Amaury Delerue

14 September 2013 5	Guingamp	1–1	Bastia	Guingamp
20:00	Sankharé (yellow card) 66'; Yatabaré (yellow card) 88', (goal) 88' (pen.)	Report	(yellow card) 27' Ilan; 47' Khazri; (yellow card) 87' Diakité; (yellow card) 90+4' Modesto	Stadium: Stade du Roudourou; Attendance: 13,084; Referee: Tony Chapron

21 September 2013 6	Bastia	0–0	Marseille	Furiani
17:00	Cahuzac (yellow card) 79'; Squillaci (yellow card) 86'	Report		Stadium: Stade Armand Cesari; Attendance: 14,989; Referee: Laurent Duhamel

25 September 2013 7	Monaco	3–0	Bastia	Monaco
21:00	Rivière 39'; Falcao 41', 89', (yellow card) 90+2'	Report	(yellow card) 77' Romaric	Stadium: Stade Louis II; Attendance: 7,643; Referee: Lionel Jaffredo

28 September 2013 8	Saint-Étienne	2–2	Bastia	Saint-Étienne
20:00	Tabanou 27'; Diomande 57', (yellow card) 73'; Hamouma (yellow card) 73'	Report	(yellow card) 23' Cioni; (yellow card) 38' Diakité; (yellow card) 83' Romaric; 85' Bruno; (yellow card) 88', (goal) 90+4' Modesto	Stadium: Stade Geoffroy-Guichard; Attendance: 31,952; Referee: Antony Gautier

4 October 2013 9	Bastia	4–1	Lorient	Furiani
20:30	Boudebouz 6'; Khazri 23' (pen.); Bruno (yellow card) 35'; Krasić 59'; Romaric 79'; Palmieri (yellow card) 81'	Report	(yellow card) 22' Gassama; 31' Coutadeur; (yellow card) 53' Baca; (yellow card) 78' Ecuele Manga; (red card) 84' Azouni; (yellow card) 90+1' Lautoa	Stadium: Stade Armand Cesari; Attendance: 13,114; Referee: Ruddy Buquet

19 October 2013 10	Paris Saint-Germain	4–0	Bastia	Paris
17:00	Ibrahimović 10', 13'; Cavani 62', 89' (pen.)	Report	(yellow card) 31' Palmieri; (yellow card) 88' Landreau	Stadium: Parc des Princes; Attendance: 45,803; Referee: Bartolomeu Varela

26 October 2013 11	Bastia	1–0	Nice	Furiani
20:00	Squillaci 36'; Cahuzac (yellow card) 56'; Bruno (red card) 58'; Raspentino (yellow card) 80'	Report	(yellow card) 28' Pejčinović; (yellow card) 61' Puel; (yellow card) 78' (red card) 86' Traoré; (yellow card) 80' Digard	Stadium: Stade Armand Cesari; Attendance: 14,607; Referee: Lionel Jaffredo

2 November 2013 12	Reims	4–2	Bastia	Reims
20:00	De Préville 24'; Krychowiak 44' (pen.); Oniangué 50'; Atar 81'; Courtet (yellow card) 88'	Report	47' Romaric; (yellow card) 88', (goal) 90+3' Khazri	Stadium: Stade Auguste Delaune; Attendance: 13,712; Referee: Clément Turpin

9 November 2013 13	Bastia	1–0	Rennes	Furiani
20:00	Bruno 8', (yellow card) 31'	Report	(yellow card) 36' M'Bengué; (yellow card) 80' Bakayoko	Stadium: Stade Armand Cesari; Attendance: 13,588; Referee: Philippe Kalt

23 November 2013 14	Sochaux	1–1	Bastia	Montbéliard
20:00	Mayuka 74'	Report	31' Boudebouz; (yellow card) 38' Cahuzac; (yellow card) 40' Bruno; (yellow card) 90+2' Khazri	Stadium: Stade Auguste Bonal; Attendance: 14,551; Referee: Wilfried Bien

1 December 2013 15	Bastia	2–0	Evian TG	Furiani
17:00	Squillaci (yellow card) 16'; Krasić 49'; Khazri 90+5'	Report	(yellow card) 40' Angoula; (yellow card) 65' Sorlin	Stadium: Stade Armand Cesari; Attendance: 12,941; Referee: Stéphane Jochem

4 December 2013 16	Ajaccio	1–1	Bastia	Fos-sur-Mer
20:00	Conçalves (yellow card) 74'; Dielna (yellow card) 37'; Nadeau (red card) 62'; Eduardo 82'	Report	9' Raspentino; (yellow card) 79' Palmieri	Stadium: Stade Parsemain; Attendance: 0 Referee: Alexandre Castro
Note: Following incidents between the two team in the precedent season, Ajaccio and Bastia were sanctioned to host the next two confrontations in a neutral stadium and behind closed doors. Ajaccio hosted at Stade Parsemain.

8 December 2013 17	Bastia	1–3	Lyon	Furiani
17:00	Raspentino 34'; Ba (yellow card) 54'; Cahuzac (yellow card) 69' (yellow-red card) 88'; Palmieri (yellow card) 72'; Bruno (yellow card) 79'	Report	(yellow card) 32' Gonalons; 53' Lacazette; 56' Benzia; 85' Gomis	Stadium: Stade Armand Cesari; Attendance: 13,722; Referee: Bartolomeu Varela

15 December 2013 18	Lille	2–1	Bastia	Villeneuve-d'Ascq
17:00	Kalou 17', 22'; Baša (yellow card) 27'; Martin (yellow card) 51'; Kjær (yellow card) 87'	Report	3', (yellow card) 41' Genest	Stadium: Stade Pierre-Mauroy; Attendance: 37,682; Referee: Sébastien Desiage

21 December 2013 19	Bastia	0–0	Montpellier	Furiani
20:00	Keserü (yellow card) 53'; Diakité (yellow card) 69'	Report	(yellow card) 90' Deplagne	Stadium: Stade Armand Cesari; Attendance: 12,903; Referee: Antony Gautier

11 January 2014 20	Valenciennes	3–2	Bastia	Valenciennes
20:00	Dossevi 33', 35'; Waris 54'	Report	71' Romaric; 82' Ilan	Stadium: Stade du Hainaut; Attendance: 13,349; Referee: Clément Turpin

18 January 2014 21	Bastia	1–0	Bordeaux	Furiani
20:00	Diakité (yellow card) 28'; Ba 42'; Cahuzac (yellow card) 79'	Report	(yellow card) 79' Faubert	Stadium: Stade Armand Cesari; Attendance: 12,778; Referee: Wilfried Bien

11 February 2014 22	Toulouse	1–3	Bastia	Toulouse
20:30	Maury (yellow card) 13'; Ben Basat 25'; Yago (yellow card) 41'; Chantôme (yellow card) 73' (yellow-red card) 74'	Report	11' Cissé; (yellow card) 26' Yatabaré; 45+1', (yellow card) 51' Modesto; (yellow card) 85' Khazri; 90+2' (pen.) Bruno	Stadium: Stadium Municipal; Attendance: 11,025; Referee: Fredy Fautrel

1 February 2014 23	Bastia	3–2	Guingamp	Furiani
20:00	Ba 52'; S. Yatabaré (yellow card) 62'; Squillaci 82'; Boudebouz 88' (pen.); Khazri (yellow card) 90+1'	Report	50', 55' Alioui; (yellow card) 71' M. Yatabaré; (yellow card) 88' Sankharé	Stadium: Stade Armand Cesari; Attendance: 12,241; Referee: Nicolas Rainville

8 February 2014 24	Marseille	3–0	Bastia	Marseille
17:00	Payet 13', 25'; Romao (yellow card) 18'; Gignac 55'	Report	(yellow card) 35' Romaric; (yellow card) 35' Cahuzac	Stadium: Stade Vélodrome; Attendance: 36,420; Referee: Benoît Millot

15 February 2014 25	Bastia	0–2	Monaco	Furiani
17:00	Squillaci (yellow card) 44'; Yatabaré (yellow card) 62'; Khazri (yellow card) 85'	Report	45', 77' James; (yellow card) 56' Rivière	Stadium: Stade Armand Cesari; Attendance: 13,816; Referee: Ruddy Buquet

22 February 2014 26	Bastia	0–2	Saint-Étienne	Furiani
20:00	Boudebouz (yellow card) 45'; Diakité (yellow card) 79'	Report	33' Brandão; (yellow card) 41' Perrin; 90' (o.g.) Harek	Stadium: Stade Armand Cesari; Attendance: 13,515; Referee: Stéphane Lannoy

1 March 2014 27	Lorient	1–1	Bastia	Lorient
20:00	Ecuele Manga 35'	Report	50' Bruno	Stadium: Stade du Moustoir; Attendance: 15,152; Referee: Tony Chapron

8 March 2014 28	Bastia	0–3	Paris Saint-Germain	Furiani
16:30	Cahuzac (yellow card) 16'; Harek (yellow card) 70'	Report	6', (yellow card) 47' Ibrahimović; 19', 88' Lavezzi; (yellow card) 26' Alex; (yellow card) 63' Lucas	Stadium: Stade Armand Cesari; Attendance: 14,992; Referee: Benoît Bastien

15 March 2014 29	Nice	2–0	Bastia	Nice
20:00	Bosetti 5'; Maupay (yellow card) 29', (goal) 72'	Report	(yellow card) 26' Diakité; (yellow card) 29' Modesto; (yellow card) 31' (red card) 40' Cahuzac	Stadium: Allianz Riviera; Attendance: 24,337; Referee: Bartolomeu Varela

22 March 2014 30	Bastia	2–0	Reims	Furiani
20:00	Raspentino 9'; Bruno 42'; Sablé (yellow card) 49'; Yatabaré (red card) 77'	Report	(yellow card) 68' Devaux; (yellow card) 83' Charbonnier	Stadium: Stade Armand Cesari; Attendance: 12,724; Referee: Mikael Lesage

30 March 2014 31	Rennes	3–0	Bastia	Rennes
14:00	Alessandrini 14'; Toivonen 82'; Makoun 59'	Report	(yellow card) 55' Sablé	Stadium: Stade de la Route de Lorient; Attendance: 18,474; Referee: Stéphane Lannoy

5 April 2014 32	Bastia	2–2	Sochaux	Furiani
20:00	Bruno 53'; Cissé 68'; Squillaci (yellow card) 87'	Report	(yellow card) 34' Sunzu; 45' Ayew; 45+1' Corchia; (yellow card) 58' Prcić; (yellow card) 83' Zouma	Stadium: Stade Armand Cesari; Attendance: 12,442; Referee: Amaury Delerue

12 April 2014 33	Evian TG	2–1	Bastia	Annecy
20:00	Benezet 35'; Wass 47'; Sorlin (yellow card) 58'; Tié Bi (yellow card) 69'; Cambon (yellow card) 90+2'	Report	30' Raspentino; (yellow card) 48' Romaric	Stadium: Parc des Sports; Attendance: 11,633; Referee: Philippe Kalt

20 April 2014 34	Bastia	2–1	Ajaccio	Furiani
17:00	Diakité (yellow card) 17'; Modesto (yellow card) 28'; Raspentino 32'; Squillaci 89'	Report	4' Camara; (yellow card) 40' Faty; (yellow card) 67' Hengbart	Stadium: Stade Armand Cesari; Attendance: 14,153; Referee: Lionel Jaffredo

27 April 2014 35	Lyon	4–1	Bastia	Lyon
17:00	Gomis 14'; Fekir 23', (yellow card) 23'; B. Koné 50', (yellow card) 71'; Lacazette 64'	Report	(yellow card) 39' Khazri; 47' Bruno	Stadium: Stade de Gerland; Attendance: 36,958; Referee: Benoît Millot

2 May 2014 36	Bastia	1–1	Lille	Furiani
20:30	Khazri (yellow card) 41', (goal) 85'	Report	32' Kalou; (yellow card) 73' Souaré	Stadium: Stade Armand Cesari; Attendance: 12,702; Referee: Laurent Duhamel

10 May 2014 37	Montpellier	0–2	Bastia	Montpellier
21:00	Martin (yellow card) 25'	Report	45+2', (yellow card) 81' Yatabaré; 73' Khazri	Stadium: Stade de la Mosson; Attendance: 13,969; Referee: Sébastien Desiage

17 May 2014 38	Bastia	0–0	Nantes	Furiani
21:00		Report		Stadium: Stade Armand Cesari; Attendance: 14,994; Referee: Wilfried Bien

Last updated: 17 May 2014
Source: sc-bastia.net, LFP.fr

==== Coupe de la Ligue ====
29 October 2013 Round of 32	Bastia	1–0	Ajaccio	Martigues
18:00	Ilan 7'; Krasić (yellow card) 38'	Report		Stadium: Stade Francis Turcan; Attendance: 0 Referee: Amaury Delerue
Note: Following incidents between the two team in the precedent season, Ajaccio and Bastia were sanctioned to host the next two confrontations in a neutral stadium and behind closed doors. Bastia hosted at Stade Francis Turcan.

18 December 2013 Round of 16	Evian TG	2–1	Bastia	Annecy
20:55	Wass (yellow card) 6', (goal) 62', 67'; Sougou (yellow card) 90+2'	Report	(yellow card) 10' Leca; 31' Ilan; (yellow card) 85' Achilli; (yellow card) 89' Cioni	Stadium: Parc des Sports; Attendance: 4,053; Referee: Benoît Millot

==== Coupe de France ====
5 January 2014 Round of 64	Bastia	1–0	Evian TG	Furiani
14:15	Raspentino 20'	Report	(yellow card) 47' Dja Djédjé	Stadium: Stade Armand Cesari; Referee: Fredy Fautrel

21 January 2013 Round of 32	Lens	2–1 (a.e.t.)	Bastia	Lens
18:30	Bourigeaud (yellow card) 53'; Chavarría 67'; N'Diaye 94'	Report	62' Khazri; (yellow card) 66' Boudebouz; (yellow card) 75' Bruno; (yellow card) 114' Diakité	Stadium: Stade Bollaert-Delelis; Attendance: 20,341; Referee: Lionel Jaffredo

== Statistics ==
=== Disciplinary record ===
As of 10 August 2013

#	Number	Nation	Position	Name	Ligue 1		Coupe de France		Coupe de la Ligue		Total	
#	Number	Nation	Position	Name	Yellow card	Red card	Yellow card	Red card	Yellow card	Red card	Yellow card	Red card
1	28	(Brazil)	FW	Ilan	0	1	0	0	0	0	0	1
2	17	(France)	MF	Florian Raspentino	1	0	0	0	0	0	1	0
=	18	(France)	MF	Yannick Cahuzac	1	0	0	0	0	0	1	0
=	22	(Mali)	FW	Sambou Yatabaré	1	0	0	0	0	0	1	0
TOTALS					3	1	0	0	0	0	3	1

=== The season firsts ===
- Largest losing margin: 2 goals
  - Nantes 2–0 Bastia (10 August 2013)
- Highest scoring game: 2 goals
  - Nantes 2–0 Bastia (10 August 2013)
- First yellow card of the season ( (yellow card) ): 11 minutes – Yannick Cahuzac against Nantes (10 August 2013)
- Last yellow card of the season ( (yellow card) ): 45+1 minutes – Florian Raspentino against Nantes (10 August 2013)
- Fastest yellow card of the season ( (yellow card) ): 11 minutes – Yannick Cahuzac against Nantes (10 August 2013)
- Latest yellow card of the season ( (yellow card) ): 45+1 minutes – Florian Raspentino against Nantes (10 August 2012)
- First red card of the season ( (red card) ): 70 minutes – Ilan against Nantes (10 August 2013)
- Last red card of the season ( (red card) ): 70 minutes – Ilan against Nantes (10 August 2013)
- Fastest red card of the season ( (red card) ): 70 minutes – Ilan against Nantes (10 August 2013)
- Latest red card of the season ( (red card) ): 70 minutes – Ilan against Nantes (10 August 2013)
