= 2012–13 Olympique de Marseille season =

Marseille
2012–13 season
- Chairman: Vincent Labrune
- Manager: Élie Baup
- Stadium: Stade Vélodrome
- Ligue 1: 2nd
- Coupe de France: Round of 16
- Coupe de la Ligue: Round of 16
- Europa League: Group stage
- Top goalscorer: League: André-Pierre Gignac (13); All: André-Pierre Gignac (15)
Home colours	Away colours	Third colours

The 2012–13 season of Marseille will be the club's 63rd season in the Ligue 1 and this year they will be challenging for four titles: Ligue 1, UEFA Europa League, Coupe de France and Coupe de la Ligue.

== Transfers ==
=== In ===
Dates	Player	From	Fee
1 July 2012	(Algeria) Najib Ammari	Youth system	Free
6 July 2012	(France) Florian Raspentino	(France) Nantes	Undisclosed
29 August 2012	(Brazil) Lucas Mendes	(Brazil) Coritiba	€2,200,000
31 August 2012	(Comoros) Kassim Abdallah	(France) Sedan	€500,000
31 August 2012	(England) Joey Barton	(England) Queens Park Rangers	Loan
2 January 2013	(Algeria) Foued Kadir	(France) Valenciennes	€500,000

Total spending: ▼€3,200,000

=== Out ===
Date	Player	To	Fee
10 August 2012	(France) Alou Diarra	(England) West Ham United	€2,500,000
24 August 2012	(Spain) César Azpilicueta	(England) Chelsea	€8,000,000
31 August 2012	(Cameroon) Stéphane Mbia	(England) Queens Park Rangers	€6,000,000
16 January 2013	(France) Loïc Rémy	(England) Queens Park Rangers	€8,000,000

Total income: ▲€24,500,000

== Kits ==
Marseille's home kit features the traditional white / turquoise blend with orange trims. The away kit features a retro style, with one of the club's older badges and French tricolor on collar and sleeves. The third kit is an inversion of the club's home colours, providing an intimidating black-orange look.

Home	Away	Third

== Squad statistics ==
As of June 2012

No.	Nat.	Player	Ligue 1		Coupe de France		Coupe de la Ligue		Europa League		Total	
No.	Nat.	Player	Apps	Goals	Apps	Goals	Apps	Goals	Apps	Goals	Apps	Goals
1	(France)	Gennaro Bracigliano	0	0	0	0	0	0	1	0	0	0
2	(Comoros) (Note: Abdallah was born in Marseille, France.)	Kassim Abdallah	11+2	0	0	0	0	0	3+1	0	0	0
3	(Cameroon)	Nicolas Nkoulou	38	0	0	0	0	0	7	0	0	0
4	(Brazil)	Mendes	22+3	0	0	0	0	0	5	1	0	0
5	(Senegal)	Leyti N'Diaye	0	0	0	0	0	0	0	0	0	0
6	(Gabon)	Alexander N'Doumbou	0	0	0	0	0	0	0	0	0	0
7	(France)	Benoît Cheyrou	25	2	0	0	0	0	4+3	0	0	0
8	(Ghana) (Note: Jordan Ayew was born in Marseille, France.)	Jordan Ayew	19+16	7	0	0	0	0	6+2	2	0	0
9	(France)	André-Pierre Gignac	28+3	13	0	0	0	0	0	0	0	0
10	(Ghana) (Note: André Ayew was born in Seclin, France.)	André Ayew	35	9	0	0	0	0	3+3	4	4	3
11	(France)	Loïc Rémy	2+12	1	0	0	0	0	6+1	2	1	0
12	(Ghana) (Note: Osei was born in Marseille, France.)	Kevin Osei	0	0	0	0	0	0	0+1	0	0	0
13	(France)	Rafidine Abdullah	0	0	0	0	0	0	5+1	0	0	0
14	(Senegal)	Pape M'Bow	0	0	0	0	0	0	1+1	0	0	0
15	(France)	Jérémy Morel	36	1	0	0	0	0	7	0	0	0
17	(England)	Joey Barton	20+5	0	0	0	0	0	5	1	0	0
18	(France)	Morgan Amalfitano	20+6	1	0	0	0	0	8	0	0	0
19	(Burkina Faso)	Charles Kaboré	16+1	0	0	0	0	0	7+1	0	0	0
20	(Algeria) (Note: Ammari was born in Marseille, France.)	Najib Ammari	0	0	0	0	0	0	0	0	0	0
21	(Senegal)	Souleymane Diawara	8+3	1	0	0	0	0	1	0	0	0
22	(Togo)	Sénah Mango	0	0	0	0	0	0	1	0	0	0
23	(France)	Wesley Jobello	0	0	0	0	0	0	1+1	0	0	0
26	(France)	Larry Azouni	0	0	0	0	0	0	0+1	0	0	0
24	(France)	Rod Fanni	33	2	0	0	0	0	9	1	0	0
25	(France)	Billel Omrani	0	0	0	0	0	0	1+1	0	0	0
27	(France)	Florian Raspentino	0+7	0	0	0	0	0	3+3	0	0	0
28	(France)	Mathieu Valbuena	37	3	0	0	0	0	5+3	1	0	0
29	(France)	Gadi	0	0	0	0	0	0	0	0	0	0
30	(France)	Steve Mandanda	38	0	0	0	0	0	9	0	0	0
31	(France)	Bangoura	0	0	0	0	0	0	0	0	0	0
32	(France)	Gael Andonian	0	0	0	0	0	0	0	0	0	0
34	(France)	Baptiste Aloé	0	0	0	0	0	0	1	0	0	0
40	(France)	Julien Fabri	0	0	0	0	0	0	0	0	0	0

== Competitions ==
=== Legend ===
Win Draw Loss Postponed

=== Pre-season ===
8 July 2012 Friendly	Sion	1–1	Marseille	Sion, Switzerland
	Itaperuna 21'	Report	Rémy 90'	Stadium: Stade de Tourbillon; Attendance: 7,500; Referee: Damien Carrel

13 July 2012 Friendly	Benfica	2–0	Marseille	Sion, Switzerland
	Cardozo 8'; Martins 90'	Report		Stadium: Stade de Tourbillon; Attendance: 7,500; Referee: N/A

20 July 2012 Friendly	Nîmes	2–2	Marseille	Nîmes
	Koné 51'; Benezet 55'	Report	Gignac 45'; N'Diaye 73'	Stadium: Stade des Costières; Attendance: N/A; Referee: Nicolas Rainville

25 July 2012 Friendly	Thun	3–3	Marseille	Carouge, Switzerland
	Cassio 19'; Ferreira 74'; Schneuwly 78'	Report	Amalfitano 21', 55'; Reinmann 33' (o.g.)	Stadium: Stade de la Fontenette; Attendance: 1,500; Referee: Damien Carrel

28 July 2012 Friendly	Evian	1–2	Marseille	Annecy
	Khelifa 25'	Report	A. Ayew 15'; J. Ayew 84' (pen.)	Stadium: Parc des Sports; Attendance: 2,000; Referee: Didier Falcone

=== Ligue 1 ===
==== League table ====
Pos	Team	Pld	W	D	L	GF	GA	GD	Pts	Qualification or relegation
1	Paris Saint-Germain (C)	38	25	8	5	69	23	+46	83	Qualification for the Champions League group stage
2	Marseille	38	21	8	9	42	36	+6	71	Qualification for the Champions League group stage
3	Lyon	38	19	10	9	61	38	+23	67	Qualification for the Champions League third qualifying round
4	Nice	38	18	10	10	57	46	+11	64	Qualification for the Europa League play-off round
5	Saint-Étienne	38	16	15	7	60	32	+28	63	Qualification for the Europa League third qualifying round (Note: Saint-Étienne, as winner of the 2012–13 Coupe de la Ligue, qualifies for the third qualifying round of 2013–14 UEFA Europa League.)

Source: Ligue 1
Rules for classification: 1) points; 2) goal difference; 3) number of goals scored.
(C) Champions

==== Results summary ====
Overall								Home						Away					
Pld	W	D	L	GF	GA	GD	Pts	W	D	L	GF	GA	GD	W	D	L	GF	GA	GD
38	21	8	9	42	36	+6	71	12	4	3	25	18	+7	9	4	6	17	18	−1

Source: soccerway.com

==== Results by round ====
Match	1	2	3	4	5	6	7	8	9	10	11	12	13	14	15	16	17	18	19	20	21	22	23	24	25	26	27	28	29	30	31	32	33	34	35	36	37	38
Ground	A	H	A	H	A	H	A	H	A	A	H	A	H	H	A	H	A	A	H	A	H	A	H	A	H	A	H	A	H	A	H	A	H	A	H	H	A	H
Result	W	W	W	W	W	W	L	D	L	L	W	D	L	W	W	L	W	W	W	L	W	D	L	D	W	L	W	D	D	W	W	D	W	W	W	W	L	D
Position	7	2	1	1	1	1	1	1	2	4	3	3	4	3	2	3	3	3	3	3	3	3	3	3	3	3	3	3	3	2	2	2	2	2	2	2	2	2

Source: Ligue 1
A = Away; H = Home; W = Win; D = Draw; L = Loss
Notes: Match 10 versus Lyon was postponed until 28 November 2012 and therefore should appear between matches 14 & 15.

==== Matches ====
12 August 2012 1	Reims	0–1	Marseille	Reims
21:00 CEST (UTC+02)	Ghilas (yellow card) 9'; Toudic (yellow card) 90+4'	Report	Cheyrou 78'; J. Ayew (yellow card) 90+4'	Stadium: Stade Auguste-Delaune; Attendance: 21,044; Referee: Saïd Ennjimi (Centre-Ouest)

19 August 2012 2	Marseille	2–0	Sochaux	Marseille
17:00 CEST (UTC+02)	Gignac 54'; Fanni 90'	Report		Stadium: Stade Vélodrome; Attendance: 33,624; Referee: Bartolomeu Varela (Brittany)

26 August 2012 3	Montpellier	0–1	Marseille	Montpellier
17:00 CEST (UTC+02)	Yanga-Mbiwa (yellow card) 46'; Congré (yellow card) 55'	Report	Valbuena (yellow card) 8'; Amalfitano (yellow card) 44'; Gignac 77'; N'Koulou (yellow card) 84'	Stadium: Stade de la Mosson; Attendance: 26,360; Referee: Ruddy Buquet (Picardie)

2 September 2012 4	Marseille	3–1	Rennes	Marseille
17:00 CEST (UTC+02)	Gignac (yellow card) 6', (goal) 84'; Morel 35', (yellow card) 71'; Danzé 90+4' (o.g.)	Report	Pajot (yellow card) 6'; Féret 57'; M'Vila (yellow card) 90+3'	Stadium: Stade Vélodrome; Attendance: 32,798; Referee: Olivier Thual (Aquitaine)

16 September 2012 5	Nancy	0–1	Marseille	Tomblaine
21:00 CEST (UTC+02)	Sané (yellow card) 43'; Louis (yellow card) 88'	Report	J. Ayew 53'	Stadium: Stade Marcel Picot; Attendance: 18,257; Referee: Philippe Kalt (Alsace)

23 September 2012 6	Marseille	1–0	Evian	Marseille
17:00 CEST (UTC+02)	Amalfitano 33'	Report	Angoula (yellow card) 32'	Stadium: Stade Vélodrome; Attendance: 33,774; Referee: Nicolas Rainville (Nîmes)

30 September 2012 7	Valenciennes	4–1	Marseille	Valenciennes
14:00 CEST (UTC+02)	Danic 16'; Le Tallec 34', 63'; Kadir 39'; Ducourtioux (yellow card) 72'	Report	Mandanda (yellow card) 32'; A. Ayew (yellow card) 32'; J. Ayew (yellow card) 76', (goal) 90+2'	Stadium: Stade du Hainaut; Attendance: 22,584; Referee: Bartolomeu Varela (Brittany)

7 October 2012 8	Marseille	2–2	Paris Saint-Germain	Marseille
21:00 CEST (UTC+02)	Gignac 17', 32'; Abdullah (yellow card) 77'	Report	Ibrahimović 23', 25'; Verratti (yellow card) 40'; Silva (yellow card) 55'	Stadium: Stade Vélodrome; Attendance: 39,773; Referee: Tony Chapron (Rhône-Alpes)

21 October 2012 9	Troyes	1–0	Marseille	Troyes
21:00 CEST (UTC+02)	Nivet (yellow card) 87', (goal) 89'	Report	N'Koulou (yellow card) 80'	Stadium: Stade de l'Aube; Attendance: 17,462; Referee: Wilfried Bien (Rhône-Alpes)

4 November 2012 11	Ajaccio	0–2	Marseille	Ajaccio
14:00 CET (UTC+01)	Medjani (yellow card) 70'; Gigliotti (yellow card) 80'	Report	A. Ayew (yellow card) 48', (goal) 55'; Abdallah (yellow card) 64'; J. Ayew 87'	Stadium: Stade François Coty; Attendance: 6,920; Referee: Alexandre Castro (Rhône-Alpes)

11 November 2012 12	Marseille	2–2	Nice	Marseille
14:00 CET (UTC+01)	A. Ayew 40'; Valbuena 68'	Report	Cvitanich 51', (yellow card) 55'; Abriel 88'	Stadium: Stade Vélodrome; Attendance: 32,554; Referee: Saïd Ennjimi (Centre-Ouest)

18 November 2012 13	Bordeaux	1–0	Marseille	Bordeaux
14:00 CET (UTC+01)	Gouffran 52'	Report		Stadium: Stade Chaban-Delmas; Attendance: 28,464; Referee: Lionel Jaffredo (Brittany)

25 November 2012 14	Marseille	1–0	Lille	Marseille
17:00 CET (UTC+01)	J. Ayew 46'	Report		Stadium: Stade Vélodrome; Attendance: 32,470; Referee: Laurent Duhamel (Lower Normandy)

28 November 2012 10	Marseille	1–4	Lyon	Marseille
21:00 CET (UTC+01)	Rémy 78'	Report	Gomis 3' (pen.), 34', 72'; Malbranque 38'	Stadium: Stade Vélodrome; Attendance: 35,359; Referee: Clément Turpin (Bourgogne)

2 December 2012 15	Brest	1–2	Marseille	Brest
14:00 CET (UTC+01)	Benschop 42'	Report	Diawara 34'; A. Ayew 56'	Stadium: Stade Francis-Le Blé; Attendance: 13,904; Referee: Fredy Fautrel (Lower Normandy)

9 December 2012 16	Marseille	0–3	Lorient	Marseille
16:00 CET (UTC+01)		Report	Aliadière 38'; Corgnet 48'; Monnet-Paquet 70'	Stadium: Stade Vélodrome; Attendance: 31,832; Referee: Benoît Millot (Châtenay-Malabry)

12 December 2012 17	Bastia	1–2	Marseille	Bastia
21:00 CET (UTC+01)	Modeste 80'	Report	Valbuena 15'; A. Ayew 70' (pen.)	Stadium: Stade Armand Cesari; Attendance: 0 Referee: Saïd Ennjimi (Centre-Ouest)

15 December 2012 18	Toulouse	0–1	Marseille	Toulouse
17:00 CET (UTC+01)		Report	Gignac 68'	Stadium: Stadium Municipal; Attendance: 34,805; Referee: Benoît Bastien (Lorraine)

23 December 2012 19	Marseille	1–0	Saint-Étienne	Marseille
21:00 CET (UTC+01)		Report	A. Ayew 45'	Stadium: Stade Velodrome; Attendance: 37,007; Referee: Olivier Thual (Aquitaine)

13 January 2013 20	Sochaux	3–1	Marseille	Montbéliard
21:00 CET (UTC+01)	Privat 18'; Bakambu 40', (yellow card) 83'; Morel 46' (o.g.); Lopy (yellow card) 50' (yellow-red card) 61'	Report	Ayew 55'; Amalfitano (yellow card) 90+1'	Stadium: Stade Auguste Bonal; Attendance: 13,488; Referee: Fredy Fautrel (Lower Normandy)

19 January 2013 21	Marseille	3–2	Montpellier	Marseille
17:00 CET (UTC+01)	Ayew 14'; Fanni (yellow card) 72'; J. Ayew 79'; Cignac 90+1'	Report	Herrera 17'; Jourdren (yellow card) 38'; Utaka 56'	Stadium: Stade Vélodrome; Attendance: 32,755; Referee: Lionel Jaffredo (Brittany)

26 January 2013 22	Rennes	2–2	Marseille	Rennes
17:00 CET (UTC+01)	Théophile-Catherine 59'; Alessandrini 88'	Report	A. Ayew 38'; J. Ayew 83'	Stadium: Route de Lorient; Attendance: 27,258; Referee: Tony Chapron (Rhône-Alpes)

3 February 2013 23	Marseille	0–1	Nancy	Marseille
21:00 CET (UTC+01)		Report	Sané 73'	Stadium: Stade Vélodrome; Attendance: 30,634; Referee: Wilfried Bien (Rhône-Alpes)

10 February 2013 24	Evian	1–1	Marseille	Annecy
14:00 CET (UTC+01)	Sagbo 59' (pen.)	Report	Gignac 51'	Stadium: Parc des Sports; Attendance: 14,097; Referee: Antony Gautier (Nord-Pas-de-Calais)

16 February 2013 25	Marseille	1–0	Valenciennes	Marseille
17:00 CET (UTC+01)	Fanni 90+4'	Report		Stadium: Stade Vélodrome; Attendance: 31,446; Referee: Sébastien Moreira (Franche-Comté)

24 February 2013 26	Paris Saint-Germain	2–0	Marseille	Paris
21:00 CET (UTC+01)	N'Koulou 11' (o.g.); Ibrahimović 90+1'	Report		Stadium: Parc des Princes; Attendance: 44,984; Referee: Fredy Fautrel (Lower Normandy)

3 March 2013 27	Marseille	2–1	Troyes	Marseille
17:00 CET (UTC+01)	N'Koulou 81'; Gignac 82'	Report	Marcos 71'	Stadium: Stade Vélodrome; Attendance: 32,106; Referee: Laurent Duhamel (Lower Normandy)

10 March 2013 28	Lyon	0–0	Marseille	Lyon
21:00 CET (UTC+01)		Report		Stadium: Stade de Gerland; Attendance: 38,819; Referee: Clément Turpin (Bourgogne)

15 March 2013 29	Marseille	0–0	Ajaccio	Marseille
20:30 CET (UTC+01)		Report		Stadium: Stade Vélodrome; Attendance: 30,986; Referee: Nicolas Rainville (Nîmes)

31 March 2013 30	Nice	0–1	Marseille	Nice
14:00 CEST (UTC+02)		Report	Gignac 15'	Stadium: Stade Municipal du Ray; Attendance: 17,012; Referee: Laurent Duhamel (Lower Normandy)

5 April 2013 31	Marseille	1–0	Bordeaux	Marseille
20:30 CEST (UTC+02)	Gignac 41'	Report		Stadium: Stade Vélodrome; Attendance: 32,841; Referee: Tony Chapron (Rhône-Alpes)

14 April 2013 32	Lille	0–0	Marseille	Villeneuve-d'Ascq
21:00 CEST (UTC+02)		Report		Stadium: Grand Stade Lille Métropole; Attendance: 47,828; Referee: Wilfried Bien (Rhône-Alpes)

20 April 2013 33	Marseille	1–0	Brest	Marseille
17:00 CEST (UTC+02)	Cheyrou 45+1'	Report		Stadium: Stade Vélodrome; Attendance: 33,316; Referee: Benoît Bastien (Lorraine)

27 April 2013 34	Lorient	0–1	Marseille	Lorient
17:00 CEST (UTC+02)		Report	Valbuena 25'	Stadium: Stade du Moustoir; Attendance: 17,395; Referee: Benoît Millot (Châtenay-Malabry)

4 May 2013 35	Marseille	2–1	Bastia	Marseille
17:00 CEST (UTC+02)	Gignac 12', 81'	Report	Thauvin 46'	Stadium: Stade Vélodrome; Attendance: 35,687; Referee: Sébastien Moreira (Franche-Comté)

11 May 2013 36	Marseille	2–1	Toulouse	Marseille
17:00 CEST (UTC+02)	Gignac 12', 81'	Report	Thauvin 46'	Stadium: Stade Vélodrome; Attendance: 34,666; Referee: Saïd Ennjimi (Centre-Ouest)

18 May 2013 37	Saint-Étienne	2–0	Marseille	Saint-Étienne
21:00 CEST (UTC+02)	Perrin 25'; Brandão 43'	Report		Stadium: Stade Geoffroy-Guichard; Attendance: 25,306; Referee: Lionel Jaffredo (Brittany)

26 May 2013 38	Marseille	0–0	Reims	Marseille
21:00 CEST (UTC+02)		Report		Stadium: Stade Vélodrome; Attendance: 34,808; Referee: Fredy Fautrel (Lower Normandy)

=== Coupe de France ===
6 January 2013 Round of 64	Marseille	2–1	Guingamp	Marseille
14:15 CET (UTC+01)	Gignac 23', 107'	Report	Mandanne 83'	Stadium: Stade Vélodrome; Attendance: 32,987; Referee: Sébastien Moreira

30 January 2013 Round of 32	Rouen	1–2	Marseille	Rouen
20:50 CET (UTC+01)	Dugimont 67'	Report	Valbuena 42'; Sougou 60'	Stadium: Stade Robert Diochon; Attendance: 10,500; Referee: Saïd Ennjimi

27 February 2013 Round of 16	Paris Saint-Germain	2–0	Marseille	Paris
20:50 CET (UTC+01)	Ibrahimović 34', 63' (pen.)	Report		Stadium: Parc des Princes; Attendance: 40,000; Referee: Stéphane Lannoy

=== Coupe de la Ligue ===
31 October 2012 Round of 16	Paris Saint-Germain	2–0	Marseille	Paris
20:55 CET (UTC+01)	Silva 29' (pen.); Ménez 50'	Report		Stadium: Parc des Princes; Attendance: 43,753; Referee: Antony Gautier

=== UEFA Europa League ===
==== Qualifying phase ====
===== Third qualifying round =====
2 August 2012 First leg	Eskişehirspor (Turkey)	1–1	(France) Marseille	Eskişehir, Turkey
20:45 CEST (UTC+02)	Nuhiu 62'	Report	Gignac 49'	Stadium: Atatürk Stadium; Attendance: 12,900; Referee: Pawel Gil (Poland)

9 August 2012 Second leg	Marseille (France)	3–0 (4–1 agg.)	(Turkey) Eskişehirspor	Fos-sur-Mer, France
20:45 CEST (UTC+02)	A. Ayew 7', 66'; Gignac 36'	Report		Stadium: Stade Parsemain (Note: Marseille played their home match at Stade Parsemain, Fos-sur-Mer as their own Stade Vélodrome was under renovations.); Attendance: 5,400; Referee: Artur Soares (Portugal)

===== Play-off round =====
23 August 2012 First leg	Sheriff Tiraspol (Moldova)	1–2	(France) Marseille	Tiraspol, Moldova
19:00 CEST (UTC+02)	Pajović 27'	Report	J. Ayew 18', 53'	Stadium: Sheriff Stadium; Attendance: 11,770; Referee: Sascha Kever (Switzerland)

30 August 2012 Second leg	Marseille (France)	0–0 (2–1 agg.)	(Moldova) Sheriff Tiraspol	Marseille, France
20:30 CEST (UTC+02)		Report		Stadium: Stade Vélodrome; Attendance: 9,583; Referee: Kristinn Jakobsson (Iceland)

==== Group stage ====
===== Group C =====
Pos	Team	Pld	W	D	L	GF	GA	GD	Pts	Qualification
1	(Turkey) Fenerbahçe	6	4	1	1	10	7	+3	13	Advance to knockout phase
2	(Germany) Borussia Mönchengladbach	6	3	2	1	11	6	+5	11	Advance to knockout phase
3	(France) Marseille	6	1	2	3	9	11	−2	5	
4	(Cyprus) AEL Limassol	6	1	1	4	4	10	−6	4	

Source: Soccerway

20 September 2012 1	Fenerbahçe (Turkey)	2–2	(France) Marseille	Istanbul, Turkey
19:00 CEST (UTC+02)	Erkin 28'; Alex 57'	Report	Valbuena 83'; A. Ayew 90+4'	Stadium: Şükrü Saracoğlu Stadium; Attendance: 47,000; Referee: Ivan Bebek (Croatia)

4 October 2012 2	Marseille (France)	5–1	(Cyprus) AEL	Marseille, France
21:05 CEST (UTC+02)	Fanni 42'; Mendes 61'; Rémy 76', 90+3'; Gignac 90'	Report	Ouon 22'	Stadium: Stade Vélodrome; Attendance: 12,746; Referee: Tony Asumaa (Finland)

25 October 2012 3	Borussia Mönchengladbach (Germany)	2–0	(France) Marseille	Mönchengladbach, Germany
21:05 CEST (UTC+02)	Daems 33'; Mlapa 67' (pen.)	Report		Stadium: Borussia-Park; Attendance: 45,000; Referee: Serge Gumienny (Belgium)

8 November 2012 4	Marseille (France)	2–2	(Germany) Borussia Mönchengladbach	Marseille, France
19:00 CET (UTC+01)	Barton 54'; J. Ayew 67'	Report	Hanke 20'; Arango 90+3'	Stadium: Stade Vélodrome; Attendance: 15,775; Referee: Ivan Kružliak (Slovakia)

22 November 2012 5	Marseille (France)	0–1	(Turkey) Fenerbahçe	Marseille, France
21:05 CET (UTC+01)		Report	İrtegün 39'	Stadium: Stade Vélodrome; Attendance: 14,686; Referee: Martin Atkinson (England)

6 December 2012 6	AEL (Cyprus)	3–0	(France) Marseille	Nicosia, Cyprus
19:00 CET (UTC+01)	Sá 41'; Edmar 79'; Dickson 82'	Report		Stadium: GSP Stadium; Attendance: 3,917; Referee: Robert Schörgenhofer (Austria)

== Statistics ==
=== Overall ===
Competition	Started round	Final position	First match	Last match	Number of match
Ligue 1	–	–	12 August 2012	26 May 2013	38
Europa League	Third qualifying round	Group stage	2 August 2012	6 December 2012	10
Coupe de France	Round of 64	–	6 January 2013	–	
Coupe de la Ligue	Round of 16	Round of 16	31 October 2012	31 October 2012	1

=== Goals ===
Position	Player	Ligue 1	Coupe de France	Coupe de la Ligue	UEFA Europa League	TOTAL
1	André-Pierre Gignac	3	–	–	2	5
2	André Ayew	–	–	–	2	2
2	Jordan Ayew	–	–	–	2	2
3	Benoît Cheyrou	1	–	–	–	1
3	Rod Fanni	1	–	–	–	1
Details	Other	3	–	-	6	12

== Sponsorship ==
- Intersport
- Adidas
- Groupama
- Citroën
- PMU
- Crédit Agricole
