= Florian Raspentino =

French footballer (born 1989)

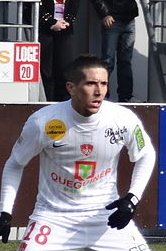
- Raspentino playing for Brest in 2013

Personal information
- Date of birth: 6 June 1989 (age 37)
- Place of birth: Marignane, France
- Height: 1.79 m (5 ft 10 in)
- Position: Forward

Team information
- Current team: GOAL FC
- Number: 27

Youth career
- 2001–2008: AS Gignac
- 2006: → Ajaccio (loan)

Senior career*
Years	Team	Apps	(Gls)
2008–2011	Marignane	63	(10)
2010–2011	Agde	33	(15)
2011–2012	Nantes	30	(7)
2012–2014	Marseille	7	(0)
2013	→ Brest (loan)	19	(4)
2013–2014	→ Bastia (loan)	22	(5)
2013–2014	→ Bastia II (loan)	2	(1)
2014–2015	Caen	17	(1)
2014–2015	Caen II	2	(0)
2015	→ Dijon (loan)	12	(3)
2015–2017	Bastia	20	(1)
2015–2017	Bastia II	7	(1)
2017–2018	Eupen	13	(2)
2018–2019	Valenciennes	28	(11)
2019–2020	Grenoble	15	(0)
2020–2021	Bastia	12	(0)
2021–2022	Bastia-Borgo	27	(6)
2022–2024	GOAL FC	56	(22)
2024	Cannes	6	(0)
2024–	GOAL FC	2	(0)
- * Club domestic league appearances and goals as of 23 November 2024

Florian Raspentino (born 6 June 1989) is a French professional footballer who plays as a forward for Championnat National 1 club GOAL FC.

== Personal life ==
Raspentino was born on 6 June 1989, in Marignane to a French mother and an Algerian father, from Algiers. Raspentino is the family name of his maternal grandmother.

== Club career ==
=== Early career ===
Raspentino spent the majority of his youth career with AS Gignac, with a brief six-month spell at Ajaccio.

In 2008, he joined Championnat de France Amateur side Marignane, where he spent the next two seasons. In 2010, he joined another CFA side, Agde, scoring 17 goals in 33 games in his first season at the club.

=== Nantes, Marseille, and loans ===
On 11 June 2011, Raspentino signed his first professional contract with Nantes.

After a successful season at the Ligue 2 club, on 6 July 2012, Raspentino agreed on a four-year contract with Ligue 1 club Marseille. On 9 January 2012 was sent on loan for the rest of the 2012–2013 season to Brest.

=== Caen and Dijon ===
After spending the 2013–14 season on loan with Bastia, Raspentino signed a three-year contract with promoted team Caen. A few months later, he was loaned to Ligue 2 team Dijon.

=== Return to Bastia ===
On 31 August 2015, Raspentino returned to his old club Bastia signing on a one-year deal, with an option of a second year. He scored his first goal of the season on 2 December 2015, helping his side to 1–0 victory over Bordeaux. Raspentino left the club in the summer of 2017 when his contract had ended.

=== Eupen ===
In December 2017, free agent Raspentino signed for Belgian First Division A club Eupen and immediately started in the away match against Anderlecht. On 31 August 2018, the last day of the 2018 summer transfer window, he agreed the termination of his contract with Eupen.

=== Grenoble and third Bastia spell ===
Ahead of the 2019–20 season Raspentino joined Ligue 2 side Grenoble on a two-year contract. After a disappointing first season which was cut short by the COVID-19 pandemic he agreed to terminate his contract.

On 22 September 2020, Bastia announced that Raspentino had signed for a third spell with the newly promoted Championnat National club, agreeing a one-year contract.

=== Bastia-Borgo ===
On 25 August 2021, Raspentino joined Bastia-Borgo.

=== GOAL FC ===
Raspentino moved to Championnat National 2 side GOAL FC in August 2022.

== International career ==
In late 2011 Raspentino was contacted by Nourredine Kourichi, assistant manager of the Algeria national team, to gauge his interest in representing Algeria. Raspentino responded saying he would not refuse a call-up but would prefer to settle at Marseille first.

== Career statistics ==
As of match played 29 April 2022

Appearances and goals by club, season and competition
Club	Season	League			Cup		League Cup		Other		Total	
Club	Season	Division	Apps	Goals	Apps	Goals	Apps	Goals	Apps	Goals	Apps	Goals
Agde	2010–11	CFA	33	15	1	0	0	0	0	0	34	15
Nantes	2011–12	Ligue 2	30	7	1	2	2	1	0	0	33	10
Marseille	2012–13	Ligue 1	7	0	1	0	1	0	6 (Note: Appearances in UEFA Europa League)	0	15	0
Brest (loan)	2012–13	Ligue 1	19	4	2	0	0	0	0	0	21	4
Bastia (loan)	2013–14	Ligue 1	22	5	2	1	0	0	0	0	24	6
Bastia II (loan)	2013–14	CFA 2	2	1	0	0	0	0	0	0	2	1
Caen	2014–15	Ligue 1	17	1	1	0	2	0	0	0	20	1
Dijon (loan)	2014–15	Ligue 2	12	3	0	0	0	0	0	0	12	3
Caen II	2015–16	CFA 2	2	0	0	0	0	0	0	0	2	0
Bastia	2015–16	Ligue 1	11	1	1	0	1	0	0	0	13	1
Bastia	2016–17	Ligue 1	9	0	0	0	0	0	0	0	9	0
Bastia	Total		20	1	1	0	1	0	0	0	22	1
Bastia II	2015–16	CFA 2	3	0	0	0	0	0	0	0	3	0
Bastia II	2016–17	CFA 2	4	1	0	0	0	0	0	0	4	1
Bastia II	Total		7	1	0	0	0	0	0	0	7	1
Eupen	2017–18	First Division A	9	2	0	0	0	0	10 (Note: Appearances in Belgian First Division A playoffs)	2	19	4
Eupen	2018–19	First Division A	4	0	0	0	0	0	0	0	4	0
Eupen	Total		13	2	0	0	0	0	10	2	23	4
Valenciennes	2018–19	Ligue 2	28	11	1	0	0	0	0	0	29	11
Grenoble	2019–20	Ligue 2	15	0	0	0	1	0	0	0	16	0
Bastia	2020–21	National	12	0	0	0	—		0	0	12	0
Bastia-Borgo	2021–22	National	27	6	2	0	—		—		29	6
Career total			266	57	12	3	7	1	16	2	301	63
