= Julian Palmieri =

French footballer (born 1986)

Personal information
- Date of birth: 7 December 1986 (age 39)
- Place of birth: Lyon, France
- Height: 1.70 m (5 ft 7 in)
- Position: Attacking midfielder

Senior career*
Years	Team	Apps	(Gls)
2005–2006	Bastia	3	(0)
2006–2007	Crotone	23	(0)
2007–2009	Istres	42	(2)
2009–2010	Paris FC	28	(2)
2010–2012	Istres	55	(7)
2012–2016	Bastia	132	(5)
2016–2017	Lille	22	(1)
2017–2018	Metz	15	(0)
2018–2019	Gazélec Ajaccio	14	(0)

International career
2009–	Corsica	3	(0)
- * Club domestic league appearances and goals as of 13:05, 10 March 2020 (UTC)

Julian Palmieri (born 7 December 1986) is a French professional footballer who last played for French club Gazélec Ajaccio. He has played in Ligue 1 for Lille, in Ligue 2 for SC Bastia, and in Serie B for F.C. Crotone.

== Club career ==
=== Bastia ===
In May 2012, it was announced Palmieri would rejoin former club SC Bastia.

On 10 January 2015, Palmieri scored twice as Bastia came from 0–2 down to defeat reigning champions Paris Saint-Germain 4–2.

=== Lille ===
On 2 July 2016, out-of-contract Palmieri joined Lille on a two-year contract.

=== Metz ===
In November 2017, free agent Palmieri joined FC Metz until the end of the season, to replace Matthieu Udol who had ruptured his cruciate ligaments.

== Career statistics ==
As of match played 10 March 2020

Appearances and goals by club, season and competition
Club	Season	League			Cup		Europe (Note: Includes UEFA Intertoto Cup, UEFA Cup and UEFA Champions League.)		Other		Total	
Club	Season	Division	Apps	Goals	Apps	Goals	Apps	Goals	Apps	Goals	Apps	Goals
Bastia	2005–06	Ligue 2	3	0	0	0	—		–		3	0
Crotone	2006–07	Serie B	23	0	—		—		–		23	0
Istres	2007–08	Championnat National	12	0	—		—		–		12	0
Istres	2008–09	Championnat National	30	2	1	0	—		–		31	2
Istres	Total		42	2	1	0	0	0	0	0	43	2
Paris FC	2009–10	Championnat National	28	2	—		—		–		28	2
Istres	2010–11	Ligue 2	32	4	2	0	—		–		34	4
Istres	2011–12	Ligue 2	33	3	5	0	—		–		38	3
Istres	Total		55	7	7	0	0	0	0	0	62	7
Bastia	2012–13	Ligue 1	35	1	3	0	—		–		38	1
Bastia	2013–14	Ligue 1	28	0	3	0	—		–		31	0
Bastia	2014–15	Ligue 1	35	2	4	0	—		–		39	2
Bastia	2015–16	Ligue 1	34	2	1	0	—		–		35	2
Bastia	Total		132	5	11	0	0	0	0	0	143	6
Lille	2016–17	Ligue 1	22	1	4	0	2	0	–		28	1
Metz	2017–18	Ligue 1	15	0	0	0	0	0	–		15	0
Gazélec Ajaccio	2018–19	Ligue 2	14	0	0	0	0	0	1	0	15	0
Career total			334	18	23	0	2	0	1	0	360	18
