= Sébastien Squillaci =

French footballer (born 1980)

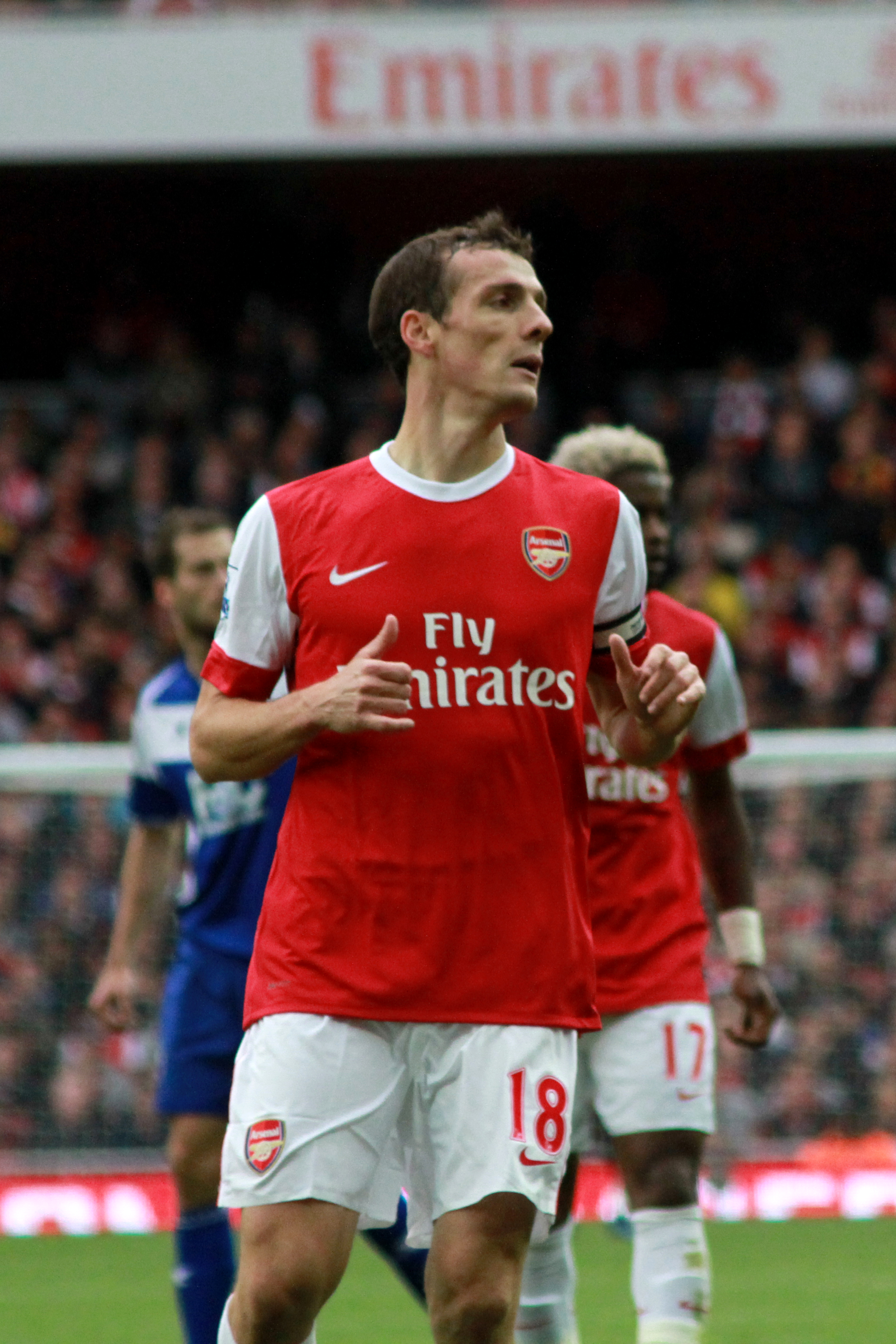
- Squillaci playing for Arsenal in 2010

Personal information
- Full name: Sébastien Jean-Baptiste Squillaci
- Date of birth: 11 August 1980 (age 46)
- Place of birth: Toulon, France
- Height: 1.85 m (6 ft 1 in)
- Position: Centre-back

Youth career
- 1986–1996: Seynois
- 1996–1997: Toulon

Senior career*
Years	Team	Apps	(Gls)
1997–1998	Toulon	5	(0)
1998–2000	Monaco B	48	(1)
1998–2006	Monaco	117	(11)
2000–2002	→ Ajaccio (loan)	69	(7)
2006–2008	Lyon	62	(3)
2008–2010	Sevilla	49	(1)
2010–2013	Arsenal	23	(1)
2013–2017	Bastia	97	(5)
Total		470	(29)

International career
2004–2010	France	21	(0)
2009–2012	Corsica	3	(0)
- * Club domestic league appearances and goals

Sébastien Jean-Baptiste Squillaci (born 11 August 1980) is a French former professional footballer who played as a centre-back. From 2004 to 2010, he played 21 matches for the France national team while also making three appearances for the Corsica national team.

Squillaci began his football career playing for hometown club Seynois in the commune of La Seyne-sur-Mer. In 1996, he joined Toulon and made his professional debut in the 1997–98 season, while the club was playing in Ligue 2. After a year with Toulon, Squillaci joined Monaco. He spent two seasons on the club's reserve team before joining Ajaccio on loan for two years. Squillaci returned to Monaco in 2002 and contributed to the team that won the Coupe de la Ligue in 2003. He also featured in European competition for the first time in his career and, in the 2003–04 season, played on the Monaco team that reached the 2004 UEFA Champions League Final. In the same season, Squillaci was named to the National Union of Professional Footballers (UNFP) Ligue 1 Team of the Year. In 2006, Squillaci signed a long-term contract with league rivals Lyon and won two consecutive league titles, as well as the Coupe de France in 2008 before departing for Spain in 2008 to join Sevilla. With Sevilla, he appeared in over 65 matches and won the Copa del Rey in his final season with the club. In 2010, Squillaci signed a three-year contract with English club Arsenal where he also reached the 2011 Football League Cup final.

Squillaci is a former France international and made his debut in August 2004 in a friendly match against Bosnia and Herzegovina. He has participated in UEFA Euro 2008, as well as the 2010 FIFA World Cup for his nation.

== Early and personal life ==
Squillaci was born in Toulon, Var. On 12 May 2007, for his positive representation of La Seyne, the commune honoured the player by naming a stadium after him. The Stade de Squillaci is currently being occupied by amateur club Avenir Sportif de Mar. Squillaci is of Corsican descent through both his mother and father. The couple moved to the mainland from the commune of Ghisonaccia in Haute-Corse. Squillaci is married and has a son, Aaron. He is a member of Champions for Peace, which is a group of 54 athletes that are committed to serving peace in the world through sport. The group was created by Peace and Sport, a Monaco-based international organisation.

== Club career ==
=== Early career ===
Squillaci began his football career playing for hometown club Seynois. While training at La Seyne, he was described by his coach Franck Seva as a "lovely, quiet boy". Squillaci spent a decade at the club before moving to professional club Toulon in 1996 at age 16. He was originally a defensive midfielder and spent only one season in the club's youth academy, where he was supervised by former club player Christian Dalger. Squillaci began the 1997–98 season playing on the club's reserve team. Following the firing of Albert Emon mid-season, he was replaced with Dalger. In March 1998, Dalger, subsequently, called up Squillaci to the first team and he made his professional debut on 7 March 1998 in a 1–0 league win over Nice appearing as a substitute for Victor Agali. With Toulon in a relegation battle, Squillaci made substitute appearances in wins over Lille, Le Mans, and Lorient and defeats to Martigues and Red Star Paris. Toulon ultimately finished the campaign in 20th place, which resulted in the club's relegation to the Championnat National, the third level of French football. Squillaci finished the season with five appearances in the league and one in the Coupe de France. Toulon, surprisingly, reached the Round of 16 in the latter competition.

=== Monaco ===
Due to not being under a professional contract while playing with Toulon, Squillaci was allowed to leave the club on a free transfer. He was recruited by Monaco and joined the club in 1998. Following his signing, Squillaci was inserted onto the club's reserve team, which was playing in the Championnat de France Amateur, the fourth level of French football. He spent two years playing on the club's reserve team from 1998 to 2000 amassing over 45 appearances. After failing to establish himself under Claude Puel, Monaco officials announced that Squillaci would be heading to Corsica to join Ligue 2 club Ajaccio on loan. In two seasons with the club, Squillaci appeared in over 70 matches and helped the club achieve promotion to Ligue 2.

After Puel's departure and the appointment of new manager Didier Deschamps, Squillaci joined Monaco in 2002. In his first full season as a player for his side, facing Real Madrid in the quarter-finals of the 2003–04 UEFA Champions League, Monaco progressed despite losing 4–2 in Madrid, due to the 3–1 victory in the return leg; the side advanced through to the semi-finals on the away goals rule, where they defeated Chelsea. Their run came to an end when they suffered a 3–0 defeat to FC Porto in the final. Squillaci made 217 appearances for the club over six seasons.

=== Lyon ===
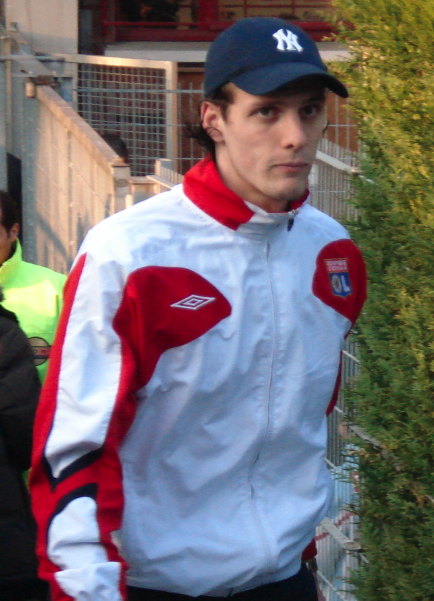
Squillaci at Lyon in 2007

After the departure of Deschamps and a disappointing 11th-place finish after years of European qualification, Squillaci opted to play elsewhere. He was linked to several clubs before inking a four-year deal with Lyon, with Sylvain Monsoreau heading the other way as compensation to Monaco. Squillaci made his Lyon debut in their opening match of the Ligue 1 season pairing with Brazilian centre-back Cris. Lyon would go on to dominate the season, winning the league by an unprecedented 18-point margin. Squillaci went on to establish himself as Lyon's first-choice centre-back alongside Cris.

=== Sevilla ===
On 14 July 2008, it was reported Lyon had reached an agreement with La Liga club Sevilla for the transfer of Squillaci for a €6.25 million transfer fee plus €500,000 in bonuses. Squillaci agreed to a three-year deal. Six months after his departure from Sevilla, in January 2011, officials of Squillaci's former club Toulon confirmed the club was seeking €150,000 in compensation from Sevilla. The compensation Toulon was seeking was related to a solidarity contribution in which 5% of any future transfer fee was allocated to the youth clubs who trained a player from ages 12–23. Sevilla agreed to meet with Toulon, but no agreement was initially reached.

=== Arsenal ===
Squillaci joined Arsenal on a three-year contract in the summer of 2010 for a fee believed to be around £4 million. He took the number 18 shirt, previously held by fellow French former Arsenal centre-backs Mikaël Silvestre and Pascal Cygan. Following an injury to centre-back Thomas Vermaelen, Squillaci formed a central defensive partnership with fellow new signing Laurent Koscielny. Squillaci scored his first goal for Arsenal in the UEFA Champions League group stage against Partizan. His first Premier League goal came against Stoke City on 23 February 2011 from a Nicklas Bendtner cross. During the 2010–11 season, Squillaci made 28 appearances and scored 2 goals for the Gunners across all competitions as Arsenal also reached the League Cup final.

Due to his poor performances in his first season and the arrival of German international Per Mertesacker in the summer of 2011, Squillaci fell down the pecking order at the club ahead of the 2011–12 season. He made his first appearance of the season in the League Cup fourth round win against Bolton Wanderers and continued to be a part of the League Cup squad, playing in the quarter-final defeat to Manchester City. He made his first Champions League appearance of the season on 6 December 2011, where he played the full 90 minutes in Arsenal's 3–1 away defeat to Olympiacos, Arsenal's final group stage match. He made his first Premier League appearance of the season on 2 January 2012 when he replaced midfielder Aaron Ramsey for the last ten minutes against Fulham after centre-back Johan Djourou was sent off. Arsenal went on to lose the match 2–1 as Squillaci's clearing header in the 92nd minute of the match fell to the feet of Bobby Zamora, who scored a volley to give Fulham all three points. On 17 February, Squillaci came on as an early substitute in Arsenal's fifth round FA Cup match at Sunderland after Francis Coquelin sustained an injury, with regular defenders Per Mertesacker and Laurent Koscielny already missing through injury. Squillaci had a torrid match, deflecting Kieran Richardson's 40th minute shot into his own net, and was himself substituted through injury in the 52nd minute as Arsenal lost 2–0. He ended the 2011–12 season with six appearances, with only one of these appearances being in the Premier League.

Squillaci made his only appearance of the 2012–13 season in a 2–1 defeat against Olympiacos in the UEFA Champions League. On 5 June 2013, Arsenal announced Squillaci, along with teammates Andrey Arshavin and Denílson, would leave the club when their contracts expired on 30 June.

=== Bastia ===
On 17 July 2013, Squillaci was unveiled as the Bastia's new number 5 on a one-year contract, with an optional extension for two years. He made his debut in the opening match of the season, a 2–0 loss against Nantes, and since established himself in the starting 11 that helped the club place in the top ten in Ligue 1. He scored his first goal of the season from a header in a 1–0 win over Nice on 26 October 2013. In October 2016, he suffered a rupture of the cruciate ligaments in the right knee. Although having signed for a new season with Bastia, he announced the end of his professional career in November 2017.

== International career ==
Squillaci was a France international with his first cap coming in 2004, making his debut in a friendly match against Bosnia and Herzegovina. He earned 21 caps for France.

Squillaci also qualifies for the non-FIFA affiliated team of Corsica, having been called three times to the team for friendlies: in 2009 against Congo, in 2011 against Bulgaria, and in 2012 against an international squad of players coached by Gérard Houllier. He qualifies through both his father and mother's Corsican heritage.

== Career statistics ==
=== Club ===
Appearances and goals by club, season and competition
Club	Season	League			National cup (Note: Includes Coupe de France, Copa del Rey, FA Cup)		League cup (Note: Includes Coupe de la Ligue, Football League Cup)		Europe		Other		Total	
Club	Season	Division	Apps	Goals	Apps	Goals	Apps	Goals	Apps	Goals	Apps	Goals	Apps	Goals
Toulon	1997–98	Division 2	5	0	1	0	—		—		—		6	0
Monaco B	1998–99	CFA	24	1	—		—		—		—		24	1
Monaco B	1999–2000	CFA	24	0	—		—		—		—		24	0
Monaco B	Total		48	1	0	0	0	0	0	0	0	0	48	1
Ajaccio (loan)	2000–01	Division 2	36	2	1	0	0	0	—		—		37	2
Ajaccio (loan)	2001–02	Division 2	33	5	1	0	0	0	—		—		34	5
Ajaccio (loan)	Total		69	7	2	0	0	0	0	0	0	0	71	7
Monaco	2002–03	Ligue 1	35	2	5	1	0	0	—		—		40	3
Monaco	2003–04	Ligue 1	27	5	3	0	0	0	11 (Note: Appearances in UEFA Champions League)	1	—		41	6
Monaco	2004–05	Ligue 1	28	2	1	0	1	0	6	0	—		36	2
Monaco	2005–06	Ligue 1	27	2	1	0	2	0	6 (Note: Two appearances in UEFA Champions League, four appearances and one goal in UEFA Cup)	1	—		36	3
Monaco	Total		117	11	10	1	3	0	23	2	0	0	153	14
Lyon	2006–07	Ligue 1	28	3	2	0	3	0	5	0	1 (Note: Appearance in Trophée des Champions)	0	39	3
Lyon	2007–08	Ligue 1	34	0	4	0	2	0	8	0	0	0	46	0
Lyon	Total		62	3	6	0	5	0	13	0	1	0	85	3
Sevilla	2008–09	La Liga	33	0	2	0	—		3 (Note: Appearances in UEFA Cup)	0	—		38	0
Sevilla	2009–10	La Liga	16	1	9	0	—		6	2	—		31	3
Sevilla	Total		49	1	11	0	—		9	2	0	0	69	3
Arsenal	2010–11	Premier League	22	1	4	0	0	0	6	1	—		32	2
Arsenal	2011–12	Premier League	1	0	2	0	2	0	1	0	—		6	0
Arsenal	2012–13	Premier League	0	0	0	0	0	0	1	0	—		1	0
Arsenal	Total		23	1	6	0	2	0	8	1	0	0	39	2
Bastia	2013–14	Ligue 1	31	3	2	0	1	0	—		—		34	3
Bastia	2014–15	Ligue 1	25	0	1	0	3	1	—		—		29	1
Bastia	2015–16	Ligue 1	31	2	1	0	1	0	—		—		33	2
Bastia	2016–17	Ligue 1	10	0	0	0	0	0	—		—		10	0
Bastia	Total		97	5	4	0	5	1	0	0	0	0	106	6
Career total			470	29	40	1	15	1	53	5	1	0	579	36

=== International ===
Appearances and goals by national team and year
National team	Year	Apps	Goals
France	2004	6	0
France	2005	4	0
France	2007	2	0
France	2008	1	0
France	2009	5	0
France	2010	3	0
Total		21	0
Corsica	2009	1	0
Corsica	2011	1	0
Corsica	2012	1	0
Total		24	0

== Honours ==
Ajaccio

- Division 2: 2001–02

Monaco

- Coupe de la Ligue: 2002–03
- UEFA Champions League runner-up: 2003–04

Lyon

- Ligue 1: 2006–07, 2007–08
- Coupe de France: 2007–08
- Trophée des Champions: 2006

Sevilla

- Copa del Rey: 2009–10

Arsenal

- Football League Cup runner-up: 2010–11

Individual

- UNFP Ligue 1 Team of the Year: 2003–04
