= Kassim Abdallah =

Footballer (born 1987)

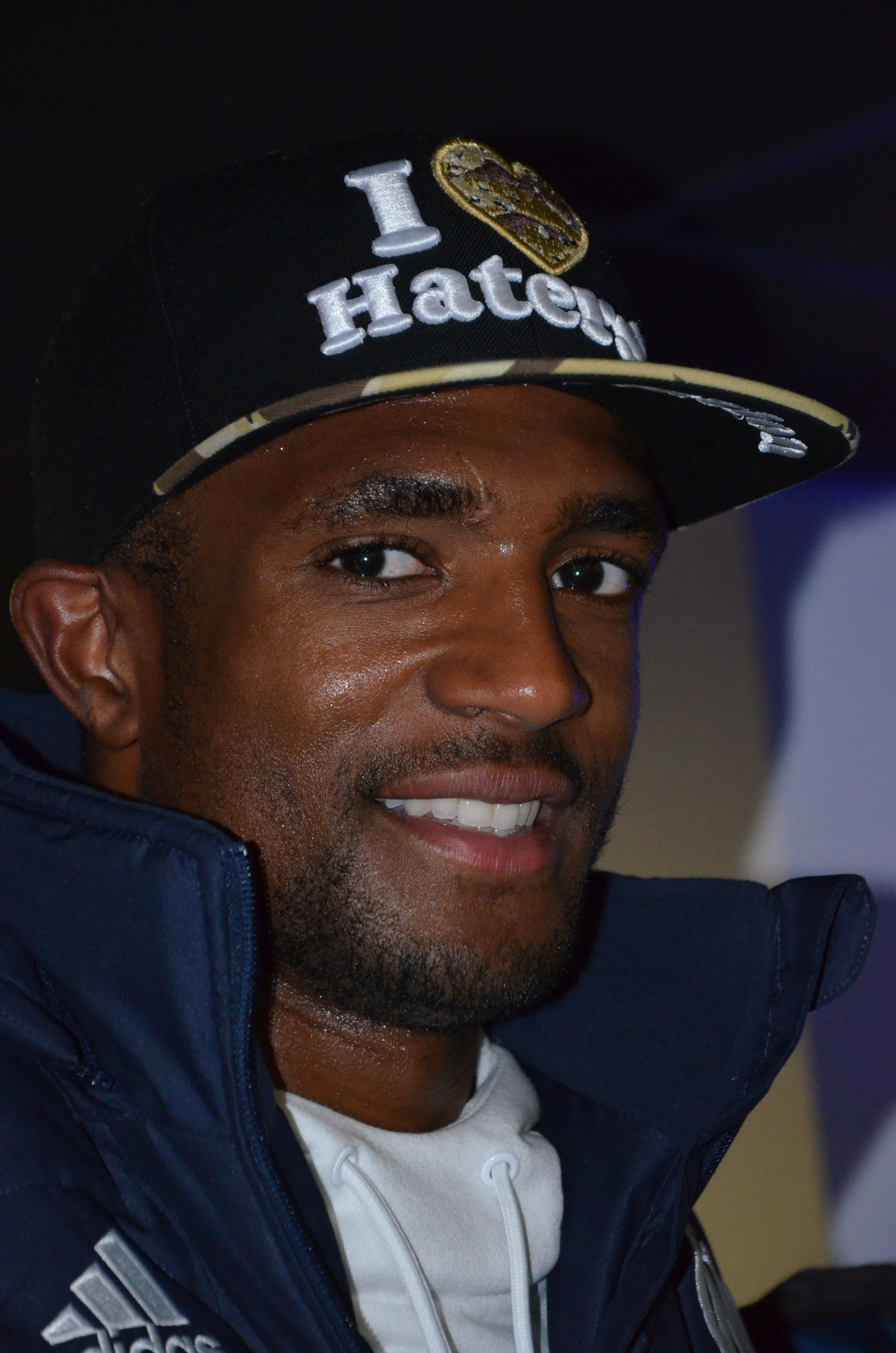
- Abdallah in 2013

Personal information
- Full name: Kassim Abdallah Mfoihaia
- Date of birth: 9 April 1987 (age 39)
- Place of birth: Marseille, France
- Height: 1.85 m (6 ft 1 in)
- Position: Defender

Team information
- Current team: Marseille II

Youth career
- 2005: AS Busserine
- 2005–2007: ASCJ Felix-Pyat

Senior career*
Years	Team	Apps	(Gls)
2007–2009	Marignane	33	(0)
2009–2012	Sedan	94	(2)
2012–2014	Marseille	23	(0)
2014–2016	Evian	55	(0)
2016–2017	Ajaccio	29	(0)
2017–2018	Al-Raed	11	(1)
2019–2021	Athlético Marseille	12	(0)
2021–2022	Marignane Gignac	22	(2)
2022–2024	Marignane GCB	36	(0)
2022–2024	Marignane GCB II	3	(0)
2024–	Marseille II	16	(0)

International career
2007–2022	Comoros	30	(1)
- * Club domestic league appearances and goals as of 14 December 2024

Kassim Abdallah Mfoihaia (born 9 April 1987) is a professional footballer who plays as a defender for Championnat National 3 team Marseille II. Born in France, he played for the Comoros national team.

== Club career ==
Abdallah began his European career in January 2005 with Atout Sport Busserine and signed a half year later in summer 2005 for Marseille-based club A.S.C. de Jeunesse Felix-Pyat. He played two years for ASCJ Felix-Pyat and signed than with the Championnat de France Amateur club Marignane. He played in two years 44 games in the Championnat de France Amateur for US Marignane.

In July 2009, he signed for Sedan. On 31 August 2012, Abdallah left Sedan for Ligue 1 side Marseille, signing a four-year deal.

On 29 January 2014, Abdallah joined Evian on a 2 1/2-year deal, ending his two-year career with Marseille. On 31 August 2016, Abdallah joined Ajaccio on a one-year contract.

After one year in Saudi Arabia, he returned to France in January 2019 and signed with Athlético Marseille.

== International career ==
Abdallah plays for the Comoros national team and earned his first cap by the Indian Ocean Island Games in a game against Madagascar.

== Personal life ==
In June 2009, four members of his family perished in the Yemenia Flight 626 crash. His mother took an earlier flight.
