= Romain Achilli =

French footballer (born 1993)

Personal information
- Full name: Romain Achilli
- Date of birth: 15 February 1993 (age 33)
- Place of birth: Bastia, France
- Height: 1.80 m (5 ft 11 in)
- Position: Forward

Team information
- Current team: Gallia Club Lucciana

Senior career*
Years	Team	Apps	(Gls)
2012–	Bastia B	57	(2)
2013–2015	Bastia	2	(0)
2016	FC Lucciana		
2016	FC Dieppe	11	(2)
2016–2017	Borgo	20	(1)
2017–2018	Bastia	10	(0)
2018–	Gallia Club Lucciana	23	(1)
- * Club domestic league appearances and goals as of 1 July 2019

Romain Achilli (born 15 February 1993) is a French footballer who plays as a forward for Gallia Club Lucciana.

== Club career ==
A former striker, Achilli gained his first call-up to the first-team of his hometown club Bastia in March 2013 against Bordeaux. He then made his competitive debut a few months later, in a Coupe de la Ligue match against Evian TG in December 2013, starting as a left-back. He debuted in Ligue 1 on 1 March 2014, in an away match against FC Lorient.

In January 2016, Achilli signed for FC Dieppe.

In August 2017, Achilli returned to former club SC Bastia as one of four new signings announced by the club, which had played in Ligue 1 in the 2016–17 season but dropped to the fifth-tier Championnat National 3 after filing bankruptcy.
