= Floyd Ayité =

Togolese footballer (born 1988)

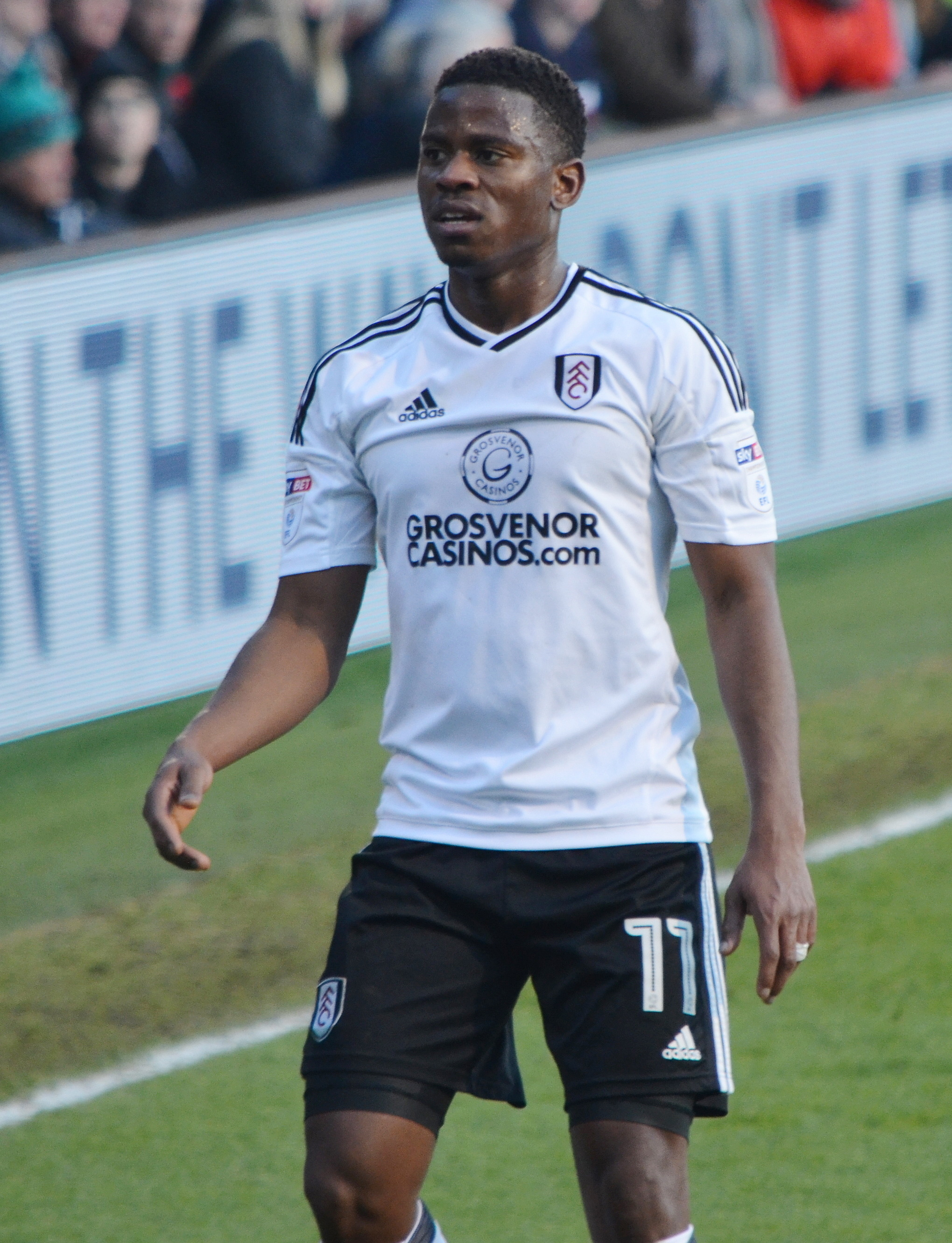
- Ayité playing for Fulham in 2018

Personal information
- Full name: Floyd Ama Nino Ayité
- Date of birth: 15 December 1988 (age 37)
- Place of birth: Bordeaux, France
- Height: 1.75 m (5 ft 9 in)
- Positions: Attacking midfielder; winger

Senior career*
Years	Team	Apps	(Gls)
2008–2011	Bordeaux	7	(0)
2008–2009	→ Angers (loan)	33	(3)
2009–2010	→ Nancy (loan)	6	(0)
2011–2014	Reims	73	(10)
2014–2016	Bastia	53	(14)
2016–2019	Fulham	78	(14)
2019–2021	Gençlerbirliği	49	(6)
2021–2023	Valenciennes	42	(3)

International career^{‡}
2007–2020	Togo	47	(11)
- * Club domestic league appearances and goals as of 28 June 2023 ‡ National team caps and goals as of 19:51, 15 December 2021 (UTC)

Floyd Ama Nino Ayité (born 15 December 1988) is a former professional footballer who played as a midfielder. Born in France, he represented the Togo national team. He is Jonathan Ayité's younger brother.

== Club career ==
Ayité was born in Bordeaux, and started his career as a footballer for home town Bordeaux. Making his debut for the club in 2008. Loan spells at Angers and Nancy followed.

In 2011, Ayité signed for Stade de Reims, where he made 73 league appearances scoring 10 goals. He joined SC Bastia in 2014 where he scored five goals in 28 league games in his first season at the club.

On 1 July 2016, Ayité signed for English Championship club Fulham for an undisclosed fee, signing a three-year contract, with a club option of a further twelve months. He scored his first goals for Fulham when he scored twice in a 4–4 draw with Wolverhampton Wanderers on 10 December 2016.

On 2 September 2019, he signed a two-year contract with Gençlerbirliği.

On 4 August 2021, he returned to France and signed a two-year contract with Valenciennes.

== International career ==
Ayité decided to follow in the footsteps of his older brother Jonathan Ayité and represent Togo, making his debut in 2008. On 14 November 2009, he scored his first goal for Togo, against Gabon.

In 2013 he played 3 matches at the 2013 Africa Cup of Nations where his team reached the quarterfinals.

== Career statistics ==
=== Club ===
As of match played 1 July 2019

Appearances and goals by club, season and competition
Club	Season	League			National cup		League cup		Other		Total	
Club	Season	Division	Apps	Goals	Apps	Goals	Apps	Goals	Apps	Goals	Apps	Goals
Angers (loan)	2008–09	Ligue 2	33	3	0	0	0	0	0	0	33	3
Nancy (loan)	2009–10	Ligue 1	6	0	1	0	0	0	0	0	7	0
Bordeaux	2010–11	Ligue 1	7	0	1	0	0	0	0	0	8	0
Reims	2011–12	Ligue 2	18	3	0	0	0	0	0	0	18	3
Reims	2012–13	Ligue 1	23	2	0	0	1	0	0	0	24	2
Reims	2013–14	Ligue 1	32	5	1	0	2	1	0	0	35	6
Reims	Total		73	10	1	0	3	1	0	0	77	11
Bastia	2014–15	Ligue 1	30	6	1	2	2	1	0	0	33	9
Bastia	2015–16	Ligue 1	32	8	1	0	1	0	0	0	34	8
Bastia	Total		62	14	2	2	3	1	0	0	67	17
Fulham	2016–17	Championship	33	9	2	0	0	0	—		35	9
Fulham	2017–18	Championship	29	4	0	0	0	0	0	0	29	4
Fulham	2018–19	Premier League	16	1	1	0	2	0	0	0	19	1
Fulham	Total		78	14	3	0	2	0	0	0	83	14
Career total			259	41	8	2	8	2	0	0	275	45

=== International ===
Scores and results list Togo's goal tally first, score column indicates score after each Ayité goal.

List of international goals scored by Floyd Ayité
No.	Date	Venue	Opponent	Score	Result	Competition
1	19 November 2008	Stade de Kégué, Lomé, Togo	Rwanda	1–0	1–0	Friendly
2	14 November 2009	Stade de Kégué, Lomé, Togo	Gabon	1–0	1–0	2010 FIFA World Cup qualification
3	13 January 2013	Stade de Kégué, Lomé, Togo	Niger	2–1	2–1	Friendly
4	10 September 2014	Stade de Kégué, Lomé, Togo	Ghana	1–0	2–3	2015 Africa Cup of Nations qualification
5	4 September 2015	El Hadj Hassan Gouled Aptidon Stadium Djibouti City, Djibouti	Djibouti	2–0	2–0	2017 Africa Cup of Nations qualification
6	5 June 2016	Antoinette Tubman Stadium, Monrovia, Liberia	Liberia	1–2	2–2	2017 Africa Cup of Nations qualification
7	11 November 2016	Stade El Menzah, Tunis, Tunisia	Comoros	1–0	2–2	Friendly
8	15 November 2016	Stade de Marrakech, Marrakesh, Morocco	Morocco	1–0	1–2	Friendly
9	24 March 2018	Stade Pierre Brisson, Beauvais, France	Ivory Coast	2–1	2–2	Friendly
10	24 March 2018	Stade Pierre Brisson, Beauvais, France	Ivory Coast	2–2	2–2	Friendly
11	16 October 2018	Independence Stadium, Bakau, Gambia	Gambia	1–0	1–0	2019 Africa Cup of Nations qualification

== Honours ==
Fulham

- EFL Championship play-offs: 2018
