= Lionel Jaffredo =

French football referee (born 1970)

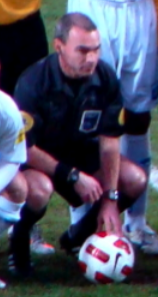
- Full name: Lionel Jaffredo
- Born: 6 July 1970 (age 56); Vannes, France

Domestic
Years	League	Role
2006–	Ligue 1	Referee

International
Years	League	Role
2008–	UEFA	Referee

Lionel Jaffredo (born 6 July 1970) is a French football referee. Born in Vannes, Jaffredo is registered as a Fédéral 1 referee in France meaning he is eligible to officiate Ligue 1 and Ligue 2 matches, as well as matches in the Coupe de France and Coupe de la Ligue. He is also a UEFA referee who officiated his first match in the UEFA Champions League on 5 August 2009 in a match between NK Maribor and FC Zürich.
