= Drissa Diakité =

Malian footballer

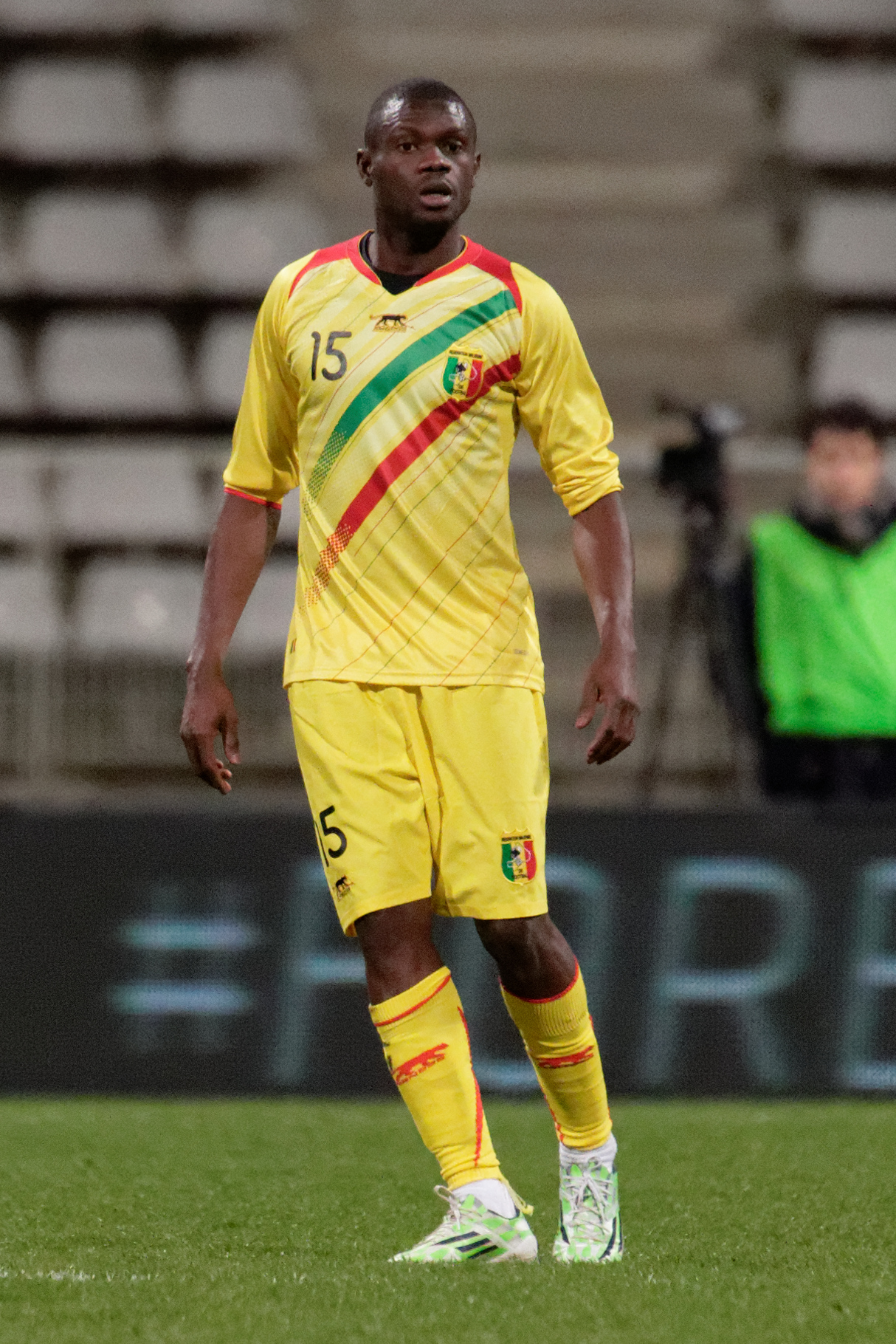
- Diakité with Mali in March 2015

Personal information
- Date of birth: 18 February 1985 (age 41)
- Place of birth: Bamako, Mali
- Height: 1.76 m (5 ft 9 in)
- Positions: Defensive midfielder; right-back

Senior career*
Years	Team	Apps	(Gls)
2001–2004	Djoliba AC	0	(0)
2004–2006	MC Alger	24	(0)
2006–2012	Nice	159	(0)
2012–2013	Olympiacos	4	(0)
2013–2015	Bastia	53	(0)
2015–2016	Tours	6	(0)
2017–2018	Kallithea	42	(0)
2018–2019	Ionikos		
2020–2024	Lucciana	43	(0)

International career
2004–2015	Mali	43	(1)
- * Club domestic league appearances and goals as of 18:01, 22 February 2022 (UTC)

Drissa Diakité (born 18 February 1985) is a former Malian professional footballer who played as a defensive midfielder and right-back. A former Mali international, he scored one goal in 43 caps for the national team from 2004 to 2015.

== Career ==
=== Early career ===
Diakité was born in Bamako, Mali. In his early career, he played for Malian club Djoliba AC and Algerian club MC Alger.

=== Nice ===
In January transfer window 2006, Diakité moved to French side Nice, with an undisclosed fee. At Nice, he played defensive midfielder or right fullback. He was fan favourite, though he has physical unwavering commitment, which he earned cards. Diakité made his debut for the club coming on as a substitute for Marama Vahirua in a 3–0 loss against Marseille. In his second half of the season, Diakité made five appearances.

In the 2006/07 season, Diakité made 25 appearances. In March 2007 he was linked with £3.5 million moves to Newcastle United, Everton and Real Zaragoza. He was labelled as a half and half of Patrick Vieira and Zé Roberto. Diakité signed a contract, that will keep him until 2010.

In the 2007–08 season, Diakite made 22 appearances. In a 0–0 draw against Sochaux, on 3 November 2007, he received a straight red card for the first time in his Nice career.

In the 2008–09 season, Diakite signed a contract until 2011 and went on to make thirty-one appearances and happen the same thing the following season. The 2010–11 season was troubled for him, as he received two cards and suffering injury. In his last season, his playing time has been more restricted, who suffered a crack in the fibula, making 16 appearances.

At the end of the 2011–12 season, Diakite was released by the club, ending his six-years association with the club. Previously in February 2012, Diakite was told by the club that he's not offered a new contract. In his Nice career, he endured what were considered below-average seasons by most in the three seasons since he arrived.

=== Greece and return to France ===
In summer 2012, he moved to Greek side Olympiacos on a one-year contract. However, Diakite made only four appearances and not even earn a first team place. At the end of 2012–13 season, Diakite was released by the club.

After one-year in Greece, Diakité return to France by joining Bastia on 29 May 2013 on a two-year contract.

== International career ==
Diakite was part of the Mali U-20 team who finish third in group stage of 2003 FIFA World Youth Championship. He was part of the Malian 2004 Olympic football team, who exited in the quarter finals, finishing top of group A, but losing to Italy in the next round.

=== International goals ===
Scores and results list Mali's goal tally first.

#	Date	Venue	Opponent	Score	Result	Competition
1.	25 March 2015	Stade Pierre Brisson, Beauvais	Gabon	1–0	3–4	Friendly

== Honours ==
Olympiacos

- Super League Greece: 2012–13

Mali

- Africa Cup of Nations bronze: 2012
