= François Modesto =

French footballer (born 1978)

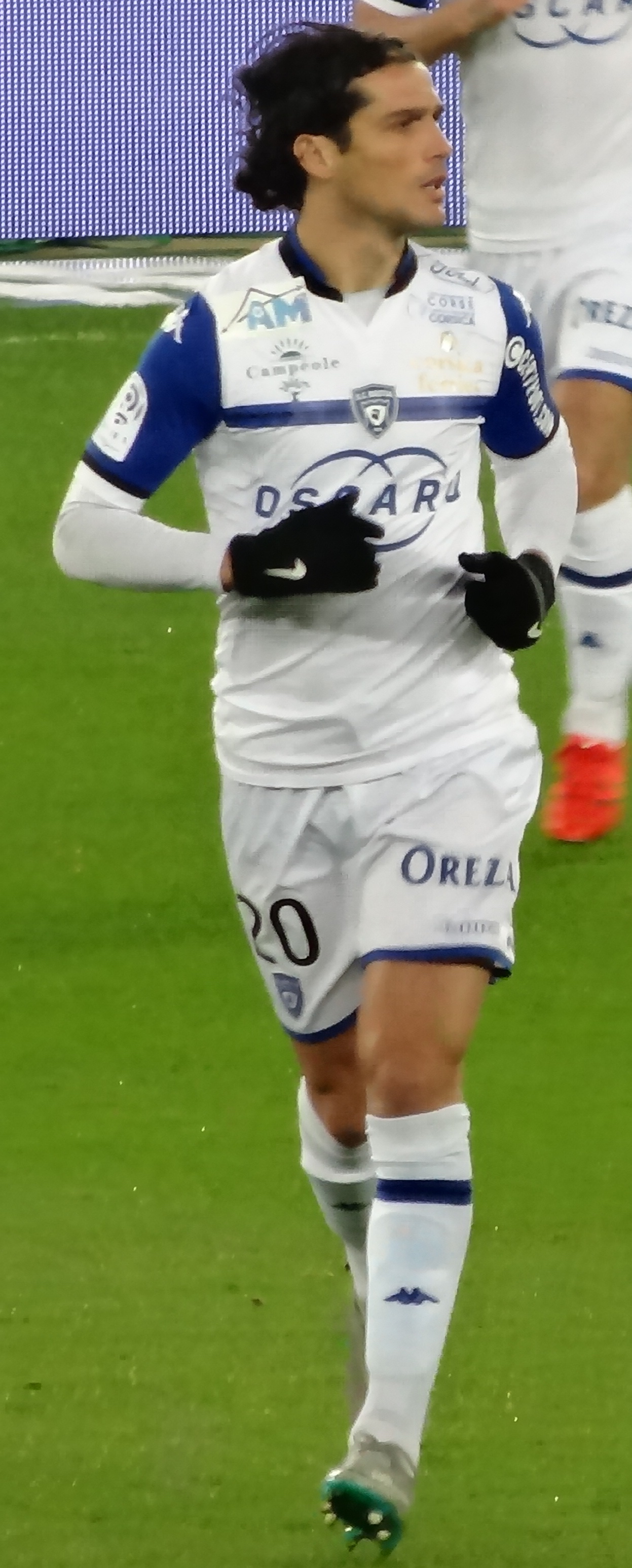
- Modesto playing with Bastia in 2016

Personal information
- Full name: François Joseph Modesto
- Date of birth: 19 August 1978 (age 48)
- Place of birth: Bastia, France
- Height: 1.83 m (6 ft 0 in)
- Positions: Defender; defensive midfielder

Youth career
- Bastia

Senior career*
Years	Team	Apps	(Gls)
1997–1999	Bastia	16	(0)
1999–2004	Cagliari	150	(3)
2004	→ Modena (loan)	1	(0)
2004–2010	Monaco	164	(6)
2010–2013	Olympiacos	69	(4)
2013–2016	Bastia	92	(4)
Total		492	(17)

International career
1998–2016	Corsica	6	(0)
- * Club domestic league appearances and goals

François Joseph Modesto (born 19 August 1978) is a French former professional footballer. He operated as a right-back or central defender, and also as a defensive midfielder.

His 19-year professional career was closely associated with Bastia, where he started and finished playing. He amassed Ligue 1 totals of 272 matches and ten goals over 11 seasons, also having a lengthy spell at Monaco; additionally, he spent five years in Italy with Cagliari and three in Greece with Olympiacos.

== Club career ==
Born in Bastia, Modesto started his career with hometown's SC Bastia. On 20 February 1998 he made his first-team – and Ligue 1 – debut, in a 2–0 home win against AS Monaco FC, and was sparingly played by the Corsicans over the course of two seasons.

Aged 21, Modesto signed with another island club, Cagliari Calcio in Italy. He appeared in 22 Serie A games in his first year, suffering relegation; in the 2003–04 campaign he played a career-high 43 matches to help the Sardinia side return to the top level, as runners-up.

Late into summer 2004, after a brief loan spell with Modena FC, Modesto was sold by Cagliari to Monaco. In his second season he made 29 league appearances (two goals) as his team finished in tenth position, adding seven in the campaign's UEFA Cup, which ended in round-of-32 against FC Basel, after a 2–1 loss on aggregate.

On 30 June 2010, Olympiacos F.C. signed Modesto for two years, with the Greek club paying him an annual salary of €550.000. During his first year, as the Piraeus team won the national championship, he was mainly used by coach Ernesto Valverde as a defensive midfielder, scoring twice in 24 matches.

Modesto netted his first goal in the UEFA Champions League on 19 October 2011, in a 3–1 group stage home victory over Borussia Dortmund. He added another in the same competition against Arsenal (same venue and result) as Olympiacos finished third in their group, being relegated to the Europa League.

In the 2013 off-season, aged nearly 35, Modesto left Olympiacos and signed a one-year contract with first club Bastia. On 10 January 2015, he contributed with one goal as his team – who ranked 19th at the time of the match – beat Paris Saint-Germain 4–2 at home, heading home after a 45th minute corner kick for the 2–2.

== Managerial career ==
In October 2017, Modesto returned to Olympiacos as chief scout. Two years later, he was appointed technical director at Nottingham Forest. On 1 August 2022, Modesto was appointed technical director of newly-promoted Serie A club Monza.

== Honours ==
Monaco

- Coupe de France runner-up: 2009–10

Olympiacos

- Super League Greece: 2010–11, 2011–12, 2012–13
- Greek Football Cup: 2011–12, 2012–13
