= 2012–13 SC Bastia season =

SC Bastia
2012–13 season
- Chairman: Pierre-Marie Geronimi
- Manager: Frédéric Hantz
- Stadium: Stade Armand Cesari
- Ligue 1: 12th
- Coupe de France: End of 64
- Coupe de la Ligue: Quarter-final
- Top goalscorer: League: Anthony Modeste (15); All: Anthony Modeste (17)
- Highest home attendance: 15,669 vs Paris Saint-Germain (22 September 2012)
- Lowest home attendance: 0 vs Marseille (12 December 2012)
- Average home league attendance: 10,245
Home colours	Away colours	Third colours

In 2012–13 French football club SC Bastia played their 107th professional season, their 47th consecutive season in French top-flight, and their 30th consecutive season in Ligue 1. Bastia is president by Pierre-Marie Geronimi, managed by Frédéric Hantz, and captained by Yannick Cahuzac for the season. Last season; finished as second league champion, and won the first league the right to rise. Bastia, is finished 12th in league, participated in the Coupe de la Ligue for the first time since 2001, reaching the quarter-final before being eliminated by Lille. In the Coupe de France; the "end of 64" tour, eliminated to CA Bastia.

Name of the team's top scorer; including 15 league goals, 17 goals scored by Anthony Modeste. Name of the team league top passer; 8 assist by Jérôme Rothen.

== Transfers ==
=== In ===
Pos.	Name	Fee	From
Summer
FW	(France) Julian Palmieri	Undisclosed	(France) Istres
MF	(France) Christophe Vincent	Free	(France) Bastia B
MF	(France) Florent André	Free	(France) Bastia B
DF	(France) Olivier Vannucci	Free	(France) Bastia B
FW	(France) Gaëtan Varenne	Free	(France) Cournon
MF	(Mali) Sambou Yatabaré	Undisclosed	(France) AS Monaco
FW	(Brazil) Ilan	Free	(France) Ajaccio
DF	(France) Sylvain Marchal	Free	(France) Saint-Étienne
GK	(France) Landry Bonnefoi	Free	(France) Amiens
FW	(France) Anthony Modeste	Loan	(France) Bordeaux
MF	(France) Julien Sablé	Free	Free
Winter
GK	(France) Mickaël Landreau	Free	Free
MF	(France) Claudio Beauvue	Loan	(France) Châteauroux
MF	(France) Florian Thauvin	Loan	(France) Lille
DF	(Senegal) Jacques Faty	Loan	(Turkey) Sivasspor
DF	(Ghana) Samuel Inkoom	Loan	(Russia) Dnipro Dnipropetrovsk

=== Out ===
Pos.	Name	Fee	To
Summer
MF	(Mauritius) Jacques-Désiré Périatambée	–	Retired
DF	(Georgia (country)) Amiran Sanaia	–	Free
FW	(Guinea) Sadio Diallo	4 million €	(France) Rennes
MF	(France) Mathieu Robail	Free	(France) Nîmes
FW	(France) David Suarez	Free	(France) Arles
FW	(France) Ludovic Genest	Loan	(France) Istres
DF	(France) Pierre-François Sodini	Free	(France) Calvi
MF	(France) Florent André	Loan	(France) Étoile Fréjus Saint-Raphaël
Winter
MF	(France) Florian Thauvin	3.5 million €	(France) Lille
DF	(France) François Marque	Free	Free
MF	(France) Salim Moizini	Free	(France) Paris FC

== Squad and statistics ==
As of 26 May 2013

No.	Pos	Nat	Player	Total		Ligue 1		Coupe de France		Coupe de la Ligue	
No.	Pos	Nat	Player	Apps	Goals	Apps	Goals	Apps	Goals	Apps	Goals
1	GK	(Brazil) BRA	Macedo Novaes	13	0	12+0	0	0	0	1+0	0
16	GK	(France) FRA	Landry Bonnefoi	11	0	7+1	0	1+0	0	2+0	0
30	GK	(France) FRA	Dominique Agostini	0	0	0	0	0	0	0	0
40	GK	(France) FRA	Mickaël Landreau	19	0	19+0	0	0	0	0	0
2	DF	(Ghana) GHA	Samuel Inkoom	4	0	2+2	0	0	0	0	0
5	DF	(France) FRA	Olivier Vannucci	0	0	0	0	0	0	0	0
6	DF	(France) FRA	Gaël Angoula	20	0	15+3	0	0	0	2+0	0
7	DF	(France) FRA	Sylvain Marchal	33	1	30+0	1	1+0	0	2+0	0
15	DF	(France) FRA	Julian Palmieri	38	1	30+5	1	0	0	3+0	0
19	DF	(France) FRA	Maka Mary	9	0	5+2	0	0	0	1+1	0
20	DF	(France) FRA	Matthieu Sans	7	0	2+4	0	0	0	0+1	0
21	DF	(Algeria) ALG	Féthi Harek	36	0	31+2	0	1+0	0	2+0	0
24	DF	(France) FRA	Jérémy Choplin	30	0	24+2	0	1+0	0	3+0	0
29	DF	(France) FRA	Gilles Cioni	30	0	24+4	0	1+0	0	1+0	0
12	DF	(Senegal) SEN	Jacques Faty	12	0	10+2	0	0	0	0	0
4	MF	(France) FRA	Julien Sablé	25	0	14+7	0	1+0	0	3+0	0
10	MF	(France) FRA	Wahbi Khazri	32	7	22+7	7	0	0	3+0	0
14	MF	(France) FRA	Claudio Beauvue	15	1	8+7	1	0	0	0	0
18	MF	(France) FRA	Yannick Cahuzac (captain)	22	0	18+1	0	1+0	0	2+0	0
22	MF	(Mali) MLI	Sambou Yatabaré	29	1	23+5	1	0	0	0+1	0
23	MF	(France) FRA	Christophe Vincent	3	0	0+2	0	0+1	0	0	0
25	MF	(France) FRA	Jérôme Rothen (2. captain)	30	3	27+1	3	0	0	2+0	0
33	MF	(Mali) MLI	Abdoulaye Keita	6	0	0+5	0	0	0	0+1	0
34	MF	(France) FRA	Mathias Llambrich	1	0	0+1	0	0	0	0	0
8	FW	(France) FRA	Toifilou Maoulida	35	8	19+12	6	1+0	0	2+1	2
9	FW	(France) FRA	Yassin El-Azzouzi	1	0	0+1	0	0	0	0	0
17	FW	(France) FRA	Florian Thauvin	35	10	25+7	10	1+0	0	2+0	0
26	FW	(France) FRA	Gaëtan Varenne	2	0	0	0	0+1	0	0+1	0
27	FW	(France) FRA	Anthony Modeste	38	17	35+1	15	0	0	2+0	2
28	FW	(Brazil) BRA	Ilan	24	3	10+12	3	1+0	0	0+1	0
33	FW	(France) FRA	Joseph Barbato	7	0	1+4	0	1+0	0	0+1	0
Players who appeared for Bastia no longer at the club:
11	DF	(France) FRA	François Marque	8	1	5+1	1	0+1	0	1+0	0
13	MF	(France) FRA	Salim Moizini	0	0	0	0	0	0	0	0

== Current technical staff ==
As of 13 June 2012

Position	Staff
Coach	Frédéric Hantz
Assistant coaches	Réginald Ray, Benoît Tavenot
Striker coach	Frédéric Née
Goalkeeper coach	Hervé Sekli
Team doctors	Marie-Claude Filippi, François Brochet
Physiotherapists	Stéphane Meunier, Mickael Bondet-Labory, Nunzia Giudicelli
Fitness coach	Didier Bouillot
Intendant	Manu Vasta
Logistical	Joseph "Jo" Bonavita

Last updated: 7 November 2011
Source: SC Bastia Official Website

== Kit ==
Supplier: Kappa
Sponsor(s): Oscaro, Corsica Ferries, Afflelou*, Géant, Kaporal Jeans*, Haute-Corse General Council, Odalys Vacances*, and Vocalcom*

Home	Away	Third

* In season sponsoring brands
Source: kappa.fr

== Friendly matches ==
6 July 2012	Gazélec Ajaccio	1–5	Bastia	Propriano, France
18:00 (UTC+1)	Verdier 61'	Report	8', 20' Maoulida; 16' Yatabaré; 32' Marque; 72' Moizini	Stadium: Stade Jacky Santucci; Attendance: 1,000; Referee: Dany

11 July 2012	Bastia	Postponed	CA Bastia	Biguglia, France

12 July 2012	Bastia	2–1	Ajaccio	Corte, France
	Yatabaré 66'; Thauvin 82'	Report	36' Belghazouani	Stadium: Stade Santos Manfredi; Attendance: 1,800; Referee: Sébastien Moreira

18 July 2012	Calvi	1–1	Bastia	Monticello, France
	Tchokounté 42'	Report	10' Yatabaré	Stadium: Stade de Monticello; Attendance: 500; Referee: Verplaetse

21 July 2012	Pécs (Hungary)	Postponed	Bastia	Annecy-le-Vieux, France

24 July 2012	Evian	0–4	Bastia	Gaillard, France
		Report	12' Maoulida; 62' Thauvin; 72', 87' Palmieri	Stadium: Stade de Gaillard; Attendance: 687; Referee: Tony Chapron

27 July 2012	Lyon-la-Duchère	2–2	Bastia	Rumilly, France
	? ?	Report	17' Vincent; 33' Khazri	Stadium: Stade de Rumilly; Attendance: 300

28 July 2012	Bastia	Postponed	(England) Liverpool	Bastia, France
				Stadium: Stade Armand Cesari

4 August 2012	Bastia	1–2	(Italy) Chievo	Bastia, France
	Rothen 61'	Report	38' Pellissier; 58' Di Michele; (yellow card) 81' Stoian	Stadium: Stade Armand Cesari; Attendance: 5,207; Referee: Sébastien Moreira

8 September 2012	Arles	5–2	Bastia	Avignon, France
17:00 (UTC+1)	Sangaré 5', 13'; Dalé 61'; Roufosse 78'; Pieroni 82'	Report	7', 15' Modeste	Stadium: Parc des Sports; Attendance: 500

13 October 2012	Istres	2–1	Bastia	Fos-sur-Mer, France
14:00 (UTC+1)	De Preville 37', 58'	Report	51' Khazri	Stadium: Stade Parsemain; Referee: Lavis

== Competitions ==
=== Ligue 1 ===
==== League table ====
Pos	Team	Pld	W	D	L	GF	GA	GD	Pts
10	Toulouse	38	13	12	13	49	47	+2	51
11	Valenciennes	38	12	12	14	49	53	−4	48
12	Bastia	38	13	8	17	50	66	−16	47
13	Rennes	38	13	7	18	48	59	−11	46
14	Reims	38	10	13	15	33	42	−9	43

Source: Ligue 1
Rules for classification: 1) points; 2) goal difference; 3) number of goals scored.

==== Results summary ====
Overall								Home						Away					
Pld	W	D	L	GF	GA	GD	Pts	W	D	L	GF	GA	GD	W	D	L	GF	GA	GD
38	13	8	17	50	66	−16	47	9	3	7	30	26	+4	4	5	10	20	40	−20

Last updated: 4 May 2013.
Source: lfp.fr

==== Results by round ====
Round	1	2	3	4	5	6	7	8	9	10	11	12	13	14	15	16	17	18	19	20	21	22	23	24	25	26	27	28	29	30	31	32	33	34	35	36	37	38
Ground	A	H	A	H	A	H	A	H	A	H	A	H	A	H	A	A	H	A	H	A	H	A	H	A	H	A	H	A	H	A	H	A	H	H	A	H	A	H
Result	W	W	L	L	L	L	D	W	D	W	L	L	L	W	D	D	L	L	W	W	L	L	D	L	L	D	W	L	W	W	W	L	L	D	L	W	W	D
Position	2	3	6	9	12	15	16	13	12	11	12	13	17	13	12	13	15	16	13	13	13	13	13	13	15	16	13	14	14	13	12	12	13	13	13	13	12	12

Source: lfp.fr
A = Away; H = Home; W = Win; D = Draw; L = Loss

==== Matches ====
Win Draw Loss Void Postponed

11 August 2012 1	Sochaux	2–3	Bastia	Montbéliard, France
21:00 (UTC+1)	Privat 13'; Lopy (yellow card) 44'; Doubai 89'	Report	(yellow card) 44' Mary; (yellow card) 53' Cahuzac; 60' Modeste; 75', 83' Maoulida; (yellow card) 76' Thauvin	Stadium: Stade Auguste Bonal; Attendance: 12,598; Referee: Jean-Charles Cailleux; Assistant referees: Nicolas Heninnot; Mathieu Grosbost; Fourth official: Alexandre Perreau Niel

18 August 2012 2	Bastia	2–1	Reims	Bastia, France
20:00 (UTC+1)	Mary (yellow card) 26'; Khazri (yellow card) 28'; Modeste 62' (pen.); Ilan 90+5'	Report	6', (yellow card) 64' Fauvergue; (yellow card) 30' Sekkat; (yellow card) 33' Ca; (red card) 59' Weber; (yellow card) 81' Agassa; (red card) 82' Tacalfred	Stadium: Stade Armand Cesari; Attendance: 13,989; Referee: Nicolas Rainville; Assistant referees: Laurent Stien; Cédric Moreau; Fourth official: Mikael Lesage

25 August 2012 3	Rennes	3–2	Bastia	Rennes, France
20:00 (UTC+1)	Alessandrini 22'; Boye (yellow card) 37'; Pitroipa 40'; M. Erdinç 85'	Report	(yellow card) 24' Cahuzac; 28' Marque; (yellow card) 54' (red card) Ilan; (yellow card) 57' Palmieri; 75', (yellow card) 80' Marchal	Stadium: Stade de la Route de Lorient; Attendance: 16,184; Referee: Benoît Bastien; Assistant referees: Frédéric Haquette; Fredji Harchay; Fourth official: Amaury Delerue

1 September 2012 4	Bastia	0–3	Saint-Étienne	Bastia, France
20:00 (UTC+1)	Palmieri (yellow card) 47'; Maoulida (yellow card) 56'; Choplin (yellow card) 64'; Yatabaré (yellow card) 86'	Report	11' Cohade; 26' Aubameyang; (yellow card) 47' Lemoine; (yellow card) 56' Ruffier; 89' Guilavogui	Stadium: Stade Armand Cesari; Attendance: 15,505; Referee: Bartolomeu Varela; Assistant referees: Tugudal Philippe; Matthieu Lombard; Fourth official: Yohann Rouinsard

15 September 2012 5	Evian	3–0	Bastia	Annecy, France
20:00 (UTC+1)	Barbosa 31', 78', (yellow card) 50'; Angoula (yellow card) 46'; Sagbo 73', (yellow card) 48'	Report	(yellow card) 54' Modeste; (yellow card) 59' Marque; (yellow card) 67' Rothen	Stadium: Parc des Sports; Attendance: 8,555; Referee: Clément Turpin; Assistant referees: Nicolas Danos; Hüseyin Ocak; Fourth official: Jérôme Miguelgorry

22 September 2012 6	Bastia	0–4	Paris Saint-Germain	Bastia, France
17:00 (UTC+1)	Cahuzac (yellow card) 33'; Yatabaré (yellow card) 43'	Report	6' Ménez; (yellow card) 33' Sakho; 40', 90', (yellow card) 44' Ibrahimović; (yellow card) 55' Van der Wiel; 72' Matuidi; (yellow card) 84' Nenê	Stadium: Stade Armand Cesari; Attendance: 15,669; Referee: Saïd Ennjimi; Assistant referees: Cédric Moreau; Alexandre Viala; Fourth official: Bartolomeu Varela

29 September 2012 7	Nice	2–2	Bastia	Nice, France
20:00 (UTC+1)	Cvitanich 32'; Civelli (yellow card) 40', (goal) 58'; Digard (yellow card) 49'; Traoré (yellow card) 66'; Bahoken (yellow card) 87'; Palun (yellow card) 87'	Report	(yellow card) 2' Cahuzac; 42' Rothen; (yellow card) 66' Maoulida; 71' Modeste; (yellow card) 90+2' Novaes	Stadium: Stade du Ray; Attendance: 9,114; Referee: Alexandre Castro; Assistant referees: Hüseyin Ocak; Mathieu Grosbost; Fourth official: Sébastien Moreira

6 October 2012 8	Bastia	3–2	Troyes	Bastia, France
20:00 (UTC+1)	Rincón 17' (o.g.); Angoula (yellow card) 33'; Modeste 37'; Choplin (yellow card) 47'; Maoulida 88'	Report	26', 48' (pen.) Marcos; (yellow card) 52' (yellow-red card) N'Sakala; (red card) 62' Thiago Xavier	Stadium: Stade Armand Cesari; Attendance: 13,326; Referee: Mikael Lesage; Assistant referees: Christophe Capelli; Régis Gaillard; Fourth official: Alexandre Perreau Niel

21 October 2012 9	Ajaccio	0–0	Bastia	Ajaccio, France
14:00 (UTC+1)	Bouhours (yellow card) 65'; André (yellow card) 81'; Cavalli (red card) 83'	Report	(yellow card) 78' Modeste; (red card) 83' Angoula; (yellow card) 90+3' Harek	Stadium: Stade François Coty; Attendance: 10,344; Referee: Laurent Duhamel; Assistant referees: Stephan Luzi; Christophe Capelli; Fourth official: Benoît Millot

28 October 2012 10	Bastia	3–1	Bordeaux	Bastia, France
17:00 (UTC+1)	Thauvin 6', 17'; Khazri 56'; Marchal (yellow card) 75'; Cahuzac (yellow card) 80'	Report	(yellow card) 16' Obraniak; 30' Gouffran; (yellow card) 70' Plašil	Stadium: Stade Armand Cesari; Attendance: 13,552; Referee: Sébastien Moreira; Assistant referees: Laurent Stien; Hüseyin Ocak; Fourth official: Didier Falcone

3 November 2012 11	Lyon	5–2	Bastia	Lyon, France
17:00 (UTC+1)	Gonalons 5'; Lacazette 26'; Lovren (red card) 30'; López 56' (pen.); Koné (yellow card) 61'; Briand 90+3'; Malbranque 90+5' (pen.)	Report	(yellow card) 19' Choplin; 28' Khazri; 32' (pen.) Rothen; (yellow card) 55' (yellow-red card) Harek; (yellow card) 70' Palmieri; (yellow card) 90' Yatabaré	Stadium: Stade Gerland; Attendance: 27,363; Referee: Fredy Faturel; Assistant referees: Cyril Gringore; Frédéric Haquette; Fourth official: Philippe Kalt

10 November 2012 12	Bastia	2–3	Valenciennes	Bastia, France
20:00 (UTC+1)	Cahuzac (yellow card) 20'; Modeste 40' (pen.); Thauvin (yellow card) 53'; Palmieri 62'	Report	(yellow card) 12' Sánchez; (yellow card) 26' Ducourtioux; 32', 78' Kadir; (yellow card) 73' Danic; 80' Dossevi	Stadium: Stade Armand Cesari; Attendance: 12,591; Referee: Lionel Jaffredo; Assistant referees: Pierre Chevreux; Tugdual Philippe; Fourth official: William Lavis

17 November 2012 13	Brest	3–0	Bastia	Brest, France
20:00 (UTC+1)	Mendy (yellow card) 12'; Touré 45', 67'; Ben Basat (yellow card) 49', (goal) 61' (pen.)	Report	(yellow card) 37' Thauvin; (red card) 51' Marque; (yellow card) 60' Sans	Stadium: Stade Francis-Le Blé; Attendance: 11,057; Referee: Alexandre Castro; Assistant referees: Mathieu Grosbost; Alexandre Viala; Fourth official: Olivier Husset

24 November 2012 14	Bastia	2–1	Lorient	Bastia, France
20:00 (UTC+1)	Modeste 11', (red card) 12'; Angoula (yellow card) 30'; Khazri 34', (yellow card) 4'; Yatabaré (yellow card) 41'; Choplin (yellow card) 68'	Report	(yellow card) 4' Monnet-Paquet; (yellow card) 24' Romao; 31', (yellow card) 56' Koné	Stadium: Stade Armand Cesari; Attendance: 12,361; Referee: Antony Gautier; Assistant referees: Mickaël Annonier; Philippe Jeanne; Fourth official: Sébastien Desiage

1 December 2012 15	Lille	0–0	Bastia	Lille, France
20:00 (UTC+1)	Martin (yellow card) 37'; Roux (yellow card) 90+2'	Report	(yellow card) 41' Palmieri; (yellow card) 84' Bonnefoi; (yellow card) 90+5' Thauvin	Stadium: Grand Stade Lille Métropole; Attendance: 38,304; Referee: Nicolas Rainville; Assistant referees: Laurent Stien; Stéphane Mercier; Fourth official: Jean-Charles Cailleux

7 December 2012 16	Toulouse	0–0	Bastia	Toulouse, France
20:45 (UTC+1)	Sirieix (yellow card) 24'; M'Bengue (yellow card) 31'; Didot (yellow card) 44'	Report	(yellow card) 31' Angoula; (yellow card) 79' Rothen	Stadium: Stadium Municipal; Attendance: 29,702; Referee: Ruddy Buquet; Assistant referees: Guillaume Debart; Régis Gaillard; Fourth official: Didier Falcone

12 December 2012 17	Bastia	1–2	Marseille	Bastia, France
21:00 (UTC+1)	Palmieri (yellow card) 21'; Bonnefoi (yellow card) 67'; Yatabaré (yellow card) 74'; Modeste 82'	Report	15' Valbuena; 70' A. Ayew; (yellow card) 80' N'Koulou	Stadium: Stade Armand Cesari; Attendance: - Referee: Saïd Ennjimi; Assistant referees: Christophe Capelli; Matthieu Lombard; Fourth official: Christian Guillard

15 December 2012 18	Montpellier	4–0	Bastia	Montpellier, France
20:00 (UTC+1)	Estrada 14'; Herrera 48'; Utaka (yellow card) 50'; Belhanda 60'; Mounier 76'	Report	(yellow card) 32' Palmieri; (yellow card) 45' Angoula; (yellow card) 75' Yatabaré	Stadium: Stade de la Mosson; Attendance: 15,229; Referee: Olivier Thual; Assistant referees: Cyril Saint Cricq Lompre; Hüseyin Ocak; Fourth official: Florent Batta

22 December 2012 19	Bastia	4–2	Nancy	Gueugnon, France
20:00 (UTC+1)	Rothen 9'; Modeste 13', 63', (yellow card) 64'; Yatabaré 26'	Report	(yellow card) 11' Puygrenier; 51' Moukandjo; (yellow card) 69' Sané; 77' André Luiz; (yellow card) 90+2' Lotiès	Stadium: Stade Jean Laville (Note: Following the decision of the Disciplinary Commission of 14 December 2012, the Competitions Commission of the LFP is the Stade Jean Laville, Gueugnon to host the meeting SC Bastia – AS Nancy-Lorraine (19th day of Ligue 1) attached Saturday, December 22 at 20:00.); Attendance: 847; Referee: Stéphane Lannoy; Assistant referees: Eric Dansault; Frédéric Dano; Fourth official: Alexandre Castro

13 January 2013 20	Reims	1–2	Bastia	Reims, France
14:00 (UTC+1)	Krychowiak (yellow card) 35'; Ca (yellow card) 37'; Courtet 63'	Report	(yellow card) 14' Palmieri; 21' Ilan; (yellow card) 37' Angoula; (yellow card) 39' Sablé; 48' Thauvin; (yellow card) 90+3' Marque	Stadium: Stade Auguste Delaune II; Attendance: 13,029; Referee: Philippe Kalt; Assistant referees: Stéphan Luzi; Philippe Jeanne; Fourth official: Jérôme Brisard

20 January 2013 21	Bastia	0–2	Rennes	Gueugnon, France
14:00 (UTC+1)	Maoulida (yellow card) 41'; Angoula (yellow card) 43'	Report	(yellow card) 24' Mavinga; 34' Alessandrini; 62' M. Erdinç; (yellow card) 87' M'Vila	Stadium: Stade Jean Laville; Referee: Clément Turpin; Assistant referees: Nicolas Danos; Alexandre Viala; Fourth official: Olivier Thual

27 January 2013 22	St. Etienne	3–0	Bastia	Saint-Etienne, France
14:00 (UTC+1)	Brandão 9'; Perrin (yellow card) 76'; Aubameyang 79'; Guilavogui 85'	Report		Stadium: Stade Geoffroy-Guichard; Attendance: 21,281; Referee: Bartolomeu Varela; Assistant referees: David Benech; Stéphane Mercier; Fourth official: Stéphane Jochem

2 February 2013 23	Bastia	0–0	Evian	Auxerre, France
20:00 (UTC+1)	Yatabaré (yellow card) 29'; Sablé (yellow card) 61'; Rothen (yellow card) 77'	Report	(yellow card) 25' Tié Bi; (yellow card) 90+5' Angoula	Stadium: Stade de l'Abbé Deschamps; Attendance: 723; Referee: Sébastien Moreira; Assistant referees: Emmanuel Boisdenghien; Hüseyin Ocak; Fourth official: Thomas Leonard

8 February 2013 24	Paris Saint-Germain	3–1	Bastia	Paris, France
20:30 (UTC+1)	Ménez 57'; Ibrahimović 71' (pen.); Lavezzi 89'	Report	(yellow card) 7' Yatabaré; (yellow card) 78' Modeste; (yellow card) 82', (goal) 83' Khazri	Stadium: Parc des Princes; Attendance: 44,619; Referee: Olivier Thual; Assistant referees: Tugudal Philippe; Cyril Saint Cricq Lompre; Fourth official: William Lavis

16 February 2013 25	Bastia	0–1	Nice	Bastia, France
20:00 (UTC+1)	Marchal (yellow card) 90'	Report	Maupay 61', (yellow card) 83'; Abriel (yellow card) 78'	Stadium: Stade Armand Cesari; Attendance: 14,551; Referee: Wilfried Bien; Assistant referees: Fabrice Plancon; Cedric Schurra; Fourth official: Benoît Millot

23 February 2013 26	Troyes	0–0	Bastia	Troyes, France
20:00 (UTC+1)		Report	(yellow card) 61' Yatabaré; (yellow card) 68' Marchal	Stadium: Stade de l'Aube; Attendance: 10,750; Referee: Saïd Ennjimi; Assistant referees: Cédric Moreau; Alexandre Viala; Fourth official: Stéphane Bar

2 March 2013 27	Bastia	1–0	Ajaccio	Bastia, France
20:00 (UTC+1)	Marchal (yellow card) 14'; Choplin (yellow card) 43'; Maoulida 47'; Thauvin (red card) 90+7'; Rothen (red card) 90+7'	Report	(yellow card) 60' Bouhours; (yellow card) 80' (yellow-red card) Chalmé; (yellow card) 90+3' (red card) Oliech; (red card) 90+7' André	Stadium: Stade Armand Cesari; Attendance: 15,205; Referee: Clément Turpin; Assistant referees: Pierre Chevreux; Nicolas Danos; Fourth official: Lionel Jaffredo

10 March 2013 28	Bordeaux	1–0	Bastia	Bordeaux, France
17:00 (UTC+1)	Diabaté 57'	Report	(yellow card) 18' Choplin; (yellow card) 90+2' Khazri	Stadium: Stade Chaban Delmas; Attendance: 15,963; Referee: Antony Gautier; Assistant referees: Mickaël Annonier; Matthieu Lombard; Fourth official: Bartolomeu Varela

16 March 2013 29	Bastia	4–1	Lyon	Bastia, France
17:00 (UTC+1)	Thauvin 45', 61'; Modeste 56'; Khazri 87'; Yatabaré (yellow card) 88'	Report	54' López; (yellow card) 80' Biševac	Stadium: Stade Armand Cesari; Attendance: 12,217; Referee: Laurent Duhamel; Assistant referees: Cyril Gringore; Hicham Zakrani; Fourth official: Mikaël Lesage

30 March 2013 30	Valenciennes	3–4	Bastia	Valenciennes, France
20:00 (UTC+1)	Gomis 9'; Penneteau (yellow card) 24'; Danic 30' (pen.); Sánchez (yellow card) 32'; Isimat-Mirin (yellow card) 36'; Pujol 90+5'	Report	(yellow card) 13' Yatabaré; 20', 49' Maoulida; 84' (pen.), 89' Thauvin	Stadium: Stade du Hainaut; Attendance: 17,017; Referee: Benoît Bastien; Assistant referees: Anthony Bremont; Stéphane Mercier; Fourth official: Stéphane Jochem

6 April 2013 31	Bastia	4–0	Brest	Bastia, France
20:00 (UTC+1)	Khazri 41'; Thauvin 50', 71'; Modeste 79' (pen.)	Report	(yellow card) 45+2' Grougi; (yellow card) 68' Mendy; (red card) 78' Hartock	Stadium: Stade Armand Cesari; Attendance: 13,371; Referee: Benoît Millot; Assistant referees: Stéphan Luzi; Cédric Schurra; Fourth official: Jérôme Miguelgorry

13 April 2013 32	Lorient	4–1	Bastia	Lorient, France
20:00 (UTC+1)	Jouffre 45'; Corgnet 53'; Pedrinho (yellow card) 67'; Aliadière 75', 83'	Report	(yellow card) 19' Yatabaré; (yellow card) 30' Palmieri; 59' Modeste	Stadium: Stade du Moustoir; Attendance: 14,270; Referee: Philippe Kalt; Assistant referees: Pierre Chevreux; Hüseyin Ocak; Fourth official: Cédric Dos Santos

21 April 2013 33	Bastia	1–2	Lille	Bastia, France
14:00 (UTC+1)	Faty (yellow card) 36'; Khazri 47', (yellow card) 9'; Yatabaré (yellow card) 74'	Report	(yellow card) 41' Balmont; (yellow card) 45+1' Payet; 85' Digne; 90+2' Baša	Stadium: Stade Armand Cesari; Attendance: 14,159; Referee: Bartolomeu Varela; Assistant referees: David Benech; Matthieu Lombard; Fourth official: Benoît Millot

27 April 2013 34	Bastia	0–0	Toulouse	Bastia, France
20:00 (UTC+1)		Report	(yellow card) 33' Tabanou; (yellow card) 65' Abdennour	Stadium: Stade Armand Cesari; Attendance: 13,130; Referee: Fredy Faturel; Assistant referees: Cyril Gringore; Guillaume Debart; Fourth official: Alexandre Castro

4 May 2013 35	Marseille	2–1	Bastia	Marseille, France
17:00 (UTC+1)	Gignac 12', 81'	Report	46' Thauvin; (yellow card) 49' Palmieri	Stadium: Stade Vélodrome; Attendance: 35,687; Referee: Sébastien Moreira; Assistant referees: Nicolas Danos; Hüseyin Ocak; Fourth official: Johan Hamel

11 May 2013 36	Bastia	3–1	Montpellier	Bastia, France
20:00 (UTC+1)	Beauvue 16'; Palmieri (yellow card) 25'; Modeste 32', 87'; Yatabaré (yellow card) 61'	Report	31' Utaka; (yellow card) 67' Bedimo	Stadium: Stade Armand Cesari; Attendance: 14,177; Referee: Antony Gautier; Assistant referees: Mickaël Annonier; Philippe Jeanne; Fourth official: Lionel Jaffredo

18 May 2013 37	Nancy	1–2	Bastia	Nancy, France
21:00 (UTC+1)	Puygrenier (yellow card) 52', (goal) 60'; Alo'o (yellow card) 54'; Moukandjo (yellow card) 79'	Report	48' Ilan; 72' Modeste; (yellow card) 78' Cahuzac	Stadium: Stade Marcel Picot; Attendance: 19,045; Referee: Laurent Duhamel; Assistant referees: Frédéric Haquette; Mathieu Grosbost; Fourth official: Alexandre Perreau Niel

26 May 2013 38	Bastia	0–0	Sochaux	Bastia, France
21:00 (UTC+1)	Choplin (yellow card) 35'; Cahuzac (yellow card) 87'	Report	(yellow card) 22' Roussillon; (yellow card) 31' Peybernes; (yellow card) 90+3' Mikari	Stadium: Stade Armand Cesari; Attendance: 14,619; Referee: Olivier Thual; Assistant referees: Cédric Moreau; Cyril Saint Cricq Lompre; Fourth official: Olivier Husset

=== Coupe de France ===
6 January 2013 End of 64	CA Bastia	2–0	Bastia	Ajaccio, France
17:00 (UTC+1)	A. N'Diaye (yellow card) 23', (goal) 38'; Marty (yellow card) 24'; Grimaldi 41'; Truchet (yellow card) 88'	Report	(yellow card) 66' Marchal	Stadium: Stade François Coty; Attendance: 2,500; Referee: Amaury Delerue

=== Coupe de la Ligue ===
25 September 2012 Third round	Bastia	3–0	Metz	Bastia, France
20:00 (UTC+1)	Maoulida 2', 50'; Angoula (yellow card) 21'; Modeste 47'	Report	(red card) 18' Bamba	Stadium: Stade Armand Cesari; Attendance: 2,095; Referee: Olivier Thual; Assistant referees: Johann Perruaux; Cyril Saint Cricq Lompre; Fourth official: Johan Hamel

7 November 2012 (Note: On 31 October 2012; following recent severe weather in Corsica, which has rendered the surface at the Stade Armand Cesari unplayable, the LFP has had no choice but to postpone Bastia's last-16 Coupe de la Ligue tie with Auxerre, originally scheduled to be played at 20:00 (UTC+1) on Wednesday night.) End of 16	Bastia	1–0	Auxerre	Bastia, France
20:00 (UTC+1)	Modeste 83'	Report	(yellow card) 77' Mandjeck	Stadium: Stade Armand Cesari; Attendance: 7,282; Referee: Wilfried Bien; Assistant referees: Fabrice Plancon; Cédric Schurra; Fourth official: Yohann Rouinsard

28 November 2012 Quarter-final	Bastia	0–3	Lille	Bastia, France
18:45 (UTC+1)	Palmieri (yellow card) 51'; Khazri (yellow card) 73'	Report	11' Bruno; 62' Rodelin; 84' Sidibé	Stadium: Stade Armand Cesari; Attendance: 6910; Referee: Tony Chapron; Assistant referees: Emmanuel Boisdenghien; Fredji Harchay; Fourth official: Bartolomeu Varela

== Statistics ==
=== Squad statistics ===
As of 26 May 2013

	League	Cup	League Cup	Total Stats
Games played	38	1	3	42
Games won	13	0	2	15
Games drawn	8	0	0	8
Games lost	17	1	1	19
Goals for	50	0	4	54
Goals against	66	2	3	71
Yellow cards	83	1	3	87
Red cards	7	0	0	7
Shots	420	n/a	n/a	420
Corners	184	n/a	n/a	184
Offsides	75	n/a	n/a	75
Possession	47%	n/a	n/a	47%
Balls played	17,468	n/a	n/a	17,468
Crosses	741	n/a	n/a	741

Last updated: 25 August 2012
Source: LFP (Matches, goals, cards, etc.)

=== Time played ===
As of 26 May 2013

Position	Nation	Number	Name	League	Cup	League Cup	Total Minutes
FW	(France)	27	Anthony Modeste	3026	0	165	3191
FW	(France)	15	Julian Palmieri	2733	0	270	3003
DF	(Algeria)	21	Féthi Harek	2607	90	180	2887
DF	(France)	24	Jérémy Choplin	2296	90	270	2646
DF	(France)	7	Sylvain Marchal	2404	90	113	2607
MF	(France)	17	Florian Thauvin	2251	90	179	2520
MF	(France)	25	Jérôme Rothen	2383	0	136	2519
MF	(France)	10	Wahbi Khazri	2040	0	270	2310
DF	(France)	29	Gilles Cioni	2026	90	90	2206
MF	(Mali)	22	Sambou Yatabaré	1983	0	38	2021
FW	(France)	8	Toifilou Maoulida	1738	90	192	2020
MF	(France)	18	Yannick Cahuzac	1562	65	132	1759
GK	(France)	40	Mickaël Landreau	1672	0	0	1672
MF	(France)	4	Julien Sablé	1334	59	135	1528
DF	(France)	6	Gaël Angoula	1307	0	180	1487
GK	(Brazil)	1	Macedo Novaes	1080	0	90	1170
FW	(Brazil)	28	Ilan	903	90	45	1038
GK	(France)	16	Landry Bonnefoi	668	90	180	938
DF	(France)	12	Jacques Faty	900	0	0	900
MF	(France)	14	Claudio Beauvue	773	0	0	773
DF	(France)	19	Maka Mary	479	0	122	601
DF	(France)	11	François Marque	433	5	90	528
DF	(France)	20	Matthieu Sans	246	0	67	313
DF	(Ghana)	2	Samuel Inkoom	218	0	0	218
FW	(France)	33	Joseph Barbato	179	90	15	283
MF	(Mali)	33	Abdoulaye Keita	99	0	10	109
MF	(France)	23	Christophe Vincent	62	31	0	93
FW	(France)	26	Gaëtan Varenne	0	25	6	31
MF	(France)	34	Mathias Llambrich	15	0	0	15
FW	(France)	9	Yassin El-Azzouzi	1	0	0	1

=== Top scorers ===
As of 18 May 2013

#	Pos.	Nat.	Num.	Name	Ligue 1	Coupe de France	Coupe de la Ligue	Total
1	FW	(France)	27	Anthony Modeste	15	0	2	17
2	MF	(France)	17	Florian Thauvin	10	0	0	10
3	FW	(France)	8	Toifilou Maoulida	6	0	2	8
4	MF	(France)	10	Wahbi Khazri	7	0	0	7
5	MF	(France)	25	Jérôme Rothen	3	0	0	3
=	FW	(Brazil)	28	Ilan	3	0	0	3
7	DF	(France)	11	François Marque	1	0	0	1
=	DF	(France)	7	Sylvain Marchal	1	0	0	1
=	MF	(France)	15	Julian Palmieri	1	0	0	1
=	MF	(Mali)	22	Sambou Yatabaré	1	0	0	1
=	MF	(France)	14	Claudio Beauvue	1	0	0	1
OWN GOAL(S)					1	0	0	1
TOTALS					50	0	4	54

=== Disciplinary record ===
As of 26 May 2013

#	Number	Nation	Position	Name	Ligue 1		Coupe de France		Coupe de la Ligue		Total	
#	Number	Nation	Position	Name	Yellow card	Red card	Yellow card	Red card	Yellow card	Red card	Yellow card	Red card
1	17	(France)	MF	Florian Thauvin	8	1	0	0	0	0	8	1
2	6	(France)	DF	Gaël Angoula	6	1	0	0	1	0	7	1
3	27	(France)	FW	Anthony Modeste	4	1	0	0	0	0	4	1
4	25	(France)	MF	Jérôme Rothen	3	1	0	0	0	0	3	1
5	21	(Algeria)	DF	Féthi Harek	2	1	0	0	0	0	2	1
=	11	(France)	DF	François Marque	2	1	0	0	0	0	2	1
7	28	(Brazil)	FW	Ilan	1	1	0	0	0	0	1	1
8	22	(Mali)	MF	Sambou Yatabaré	14	0	0	0	0	0	14	0
9	15	(France)	MF	Julian Palmieri	10	0	0	0	1	0	11	0
10	18	(France)	MF	Yannick Cahuzac	8	0	0	0	0	0	8	0
11	24	(France)	DF	Jérémy Choplin	7	0	0	0	0	0	7	0
12	7	(France)	DF	Sylvain Marchal	5	0	1	0	0	0	6	0
=	10	(France)	MF	Wahbi Khazri	5	0	0	0	1	0	6	0
14	8	(France)	FW	Toifilou Maoulida	3	0	0	0	0	0	3	0
15	19	(France)	DF	Maka Mary	2	0	0	0	0	0	2	0
=	16	(France)	GK	Landry Bonnefoi	2	0	0	0	0	0	2	0
=	4	(France)	MF	Julien Sablé	2	0	0	0	0	0	2	0
18	1	(Brazil)	GK	Macedo Novaes	1	0	0	0	0	0	1	0
=	40	(France)	GK	Mickaël Landreau	1	0	0	0	0	0	1	0
=	20	(France)	DF	Matthieu Sans	1	0	0	0	0	0	1	0
=	12	(Senegal)	DF	Jacques Faty	1	0	0	0	0	0	1	0
TOTALS					83	7	1	0	3	0	87	7

=== The season firsts ===
- First goal of the season: Anthony Modeste against Sochaux (10 August 2012)
- Last goal of the season: Anthony Modeste against Nancy (18 May 2013)
- Fastest goal of the season: 6th minutes – Florian Thauvin against Bordeaux (28 October 2012)
- Latest goal of the season: 90+5th minutes – Ilan against Reims (18 August 2012)
- First penalty goal of the season: 62nd minutes – Anthony Modeste against Reims (18 August 2012)
- First free kick goal of the season: 42nd minutes – Jérôme Rothen against Nice (29 September 2012)
- First heading goal of the season: 75th minutes – Toifilou Maoulida against Sochaux (10 August 2012)
- First doubled goal of the season: 75th & 83rd minutes – Toifilou Maoulida against Sochaux (10 August 2012)
- Largest winning margin: 4 goals
  - Bastia 4–0 Brest (6 April 2013)
- Largest losing margin: 4 goals
  - Bastia 0–4 Paris Saint-Germain (22 September 2012)
  - Montpellier 4–0 Bastia (15 December 2012)
- Most goals scored in a match: 4 goals
  - Bastia 4–0 Brest (6 April 2013)
  - Bastia 4–1 Lyon (16 March 2013)
  - Bastia 4–2 Nancy (22 December 2012)
  - Valenciennes 3–4 Bastia (30 March 2013)
- Highest scoring game: 7 goals
  - Lyon 5–2 Bastia (4 November 2012)
  - Valenciennes 3–4 Bastia (30 March 2013)
- First yellow card of the season ( (yellow card) ): 43rd minutes – Maka Mary against Sochaux (10 August 2012)
- Last yellow card of the season ( (yellow card) ): 87th minutes – Yannick Cahuzac against Sochaux (26 May 2013)
- Fastest yellow card of the season ( (yellow card) ): 2nd minutes – Yannick Cahuzac against Nice (29 September 2012)
- Latest yellow card of the season ( (yellow card) ): 90+5th minutes – Florian Thauvin against Lille (1 December 2012)
- First red card of the season ( (red card) ): 54th minutes – Ilan against Rennes (25 August 2012)
- Last red card of the season ( (red card) ): 90+7th minutes – Florian Thauvin & Jérôme Rothen against Ajaccio (2 March 2013)
- Fastest red card of the season ( (red card) ): 13th minutes – Anthony Modeste against Lorient (24 November 2012)
- Latest red card of the season ( (red card) ): 90+7th minutes – Florian Thauvin & Jérôme Rothen against Ajaccio (2 March 2013)
- Most matches played: Anthony Modeste & Julian Palmieri (38)
- Most minutes played: Anthony Modeste (3191)
- Most goals scored: Anthony Modeste (17)
- Most assists created: Jérôme Rothen (8)

== Reserves and academy ==
SC Bastia
2012–13 season
- Chairman: Pierre-Marie Geronimi
- Manager: CFA 2: Benoît Tavenot and Frédéric Née; U-19: Ghislain Printant; U-17: Olivier Sbaiz
- Stadium: Stade Armand Cesari; Stade Erbajolo
- CFA 2: Group B, 5th
- Championnat National U-19: TBA
- Coupe Gambardella: TBA
- Championnat National U-17: TBA
- Top goalscorer: League: CFA 2: Joseph Barbato (3); U-19: U-17: All: CFA 2: Joseph Barbato (3); U-19: U-17:

CFA 2 Manager	Benoît Tavenot and Frédéric Née
U-19 Manager	Ghislain Printant
U-17 Manager	Olivier Sbaiz
Physical Trainer	Jérémie Collon
Goalkeeping Coach	Ange Filiberti
Head Doctor	Louis Calendini
Physiotherapist	Henry Battesti
Ground (capacity and dimensions)	Stade Armand Cesari (16,000 / -)

Source: SC Bastia.net

=== CFA 2 ===
==== Reserve squad ====
As of 20 October 2012

Note: Flags indicate national team as defined under FIFA eligibility rules; some limited exceptions apply. Players may hold more than one non-FIFA nationality.

No.	Pos.	Nation	Player
—	GK	FRA	Thomas Vincensini
—	GK	FRA	Olivier Cristiani
—	GK	FRA	Raphaël Barallini
—	DF	FRA	Makonnen Guillaume
—	DF	FRA	Jean-Pierre Folacci
—	DF	FRA	Thierry N’Joh Eboa
—	DF	FRA	Jean-Joseph Miserazzi
—	DF	FRA	Yannick Togande
—	MF	FRA	Matthias Llambrich
—	MF	FRA	Nabil Aankour

No.	Pos.	Nation	Player
—	MF	FRA	Kévin Doncarli
—	MF	FRA	Antony Arnaudo
—	MF	MLI	Abdoulaye Keita
—	FW	FRA	Taofik El-Faqyh
—	FW	MLI	Famoussa Koné
—	FW	FRA	Romain Acchili
—	FW	FRA	François Massimi
—	FW	FRA	Joseph Barbato
—	FW	FRA	Joris Correa

==== Matches ====
26 August 2012 1	Racing Levallois	2–3	Bastia B	Colombes, France
	Beauregard 56'; Kharbouch 59'		15' André; 53', 61' Varenne	Stadium: Stade Olympique Yves-du-Manoir; Referee: Liegault

2 September 2012 2	Bastia B	2–0	Rouen B	Bastia, France
	Correa 54'; Moizini 70'			Stadium: Stade Erbajolo; Referee: Bouzalkat

8 September 2012 3	Sainte-Geneviève	3–1	Bastia B	Sainte-Geneviève-des-Bois, Essonne, France
	Sylla 48', 74'; Daoud 71'		36' Barbato; (red card) 68' Bonnefoi	Stadium: Stade Léo Lagrange; Referee: Caron

23 September 2012 4	Bastia B	0–1	Evry	Bastia, France
			80' Mogni	Stadium: Stade Erbajolo; Referee: Rasclard

6 October 2012 5	Oissel	0–4	Bastia B	Oissel, France
			14' Acchili; 40' Correa; 50' F. Koné; 85' Marque	Stadium: Stade Marcel Billard; Referee: Warembourg

21 October 2012 6	Bastia B	1–1	Moissy-Cramayel	Bastia, France
	Massimi 37'		60' Viegas	Stadium: Stade Erbajolo; Referee: Richard

3 November 2012 7	Chartres	2–2	Bastia B	Chartres, France
	Allali 16' (pen.); Charbonnier 19'; Soukouna (red card) 33'		1' (pen.), 31' Barbato	Stadium: Stade des Grands Pres; Referee: Baconnet

11 November 2012 8	Bastia B	0–1	Fleury-Mérogis	Bastia, France
			38' Lourdelet	Stadium: Stade Erbajolo; Referee: Boyer

24 November 2012 9	Bastia B	0–1	Le Havre Neiges	Bastia, France
			57' Ba	Stadium: Stade Erbajolo; Referee: Landes

==== Statistics ====
As of 24 November 2012

No.	Pos	Nat	Player	Total		CFA 2		–		–	
No.	Pos	Nat	Player	Apps	Goals	Apps	Goals	Apps	Goals	Apps	Goals
	GK	(France) FRA	Thomas Vincensini	4	0	4	0	0	0	0	0
16	GK	(France) FRA	Landry Bonnefoi	2	0	2	0	0	0	0	0
	GK	(France) FRA	Raphaël Barallini	0	0	0	0	0	0	0	0
30	GK	(France) FRA	Dominique Agostini	3	0	3	0	0	0	0	0
	GK	(France) FRA	Oilivier Cristiani	0	0	0	0	0	0	0	0
5	DF	(France) FRA	Olivier Vannucci	7	0	7	0	0	0	0	0
	DF	(France) FRA	Alexander Djiku	6	0	6	0	0	0	0	0
	DF	(France) FRA	Jean-Joseph Miserazzi	2	0	2	0	0	0	0	0
11	DF	(France) FRA	François Marque	2	1	2	1	0	0	0	0
	DF	(France) FRA	Jean-Pierre Folacci	4	0	4	0	0	0	0	0
	DF	(France) FRA	Yannick Togandé	1	0	1	0	0	0	0	0
29	DF	(France) FRA	Gilles Cioni	1	0	1	0	0	0	0	0
20	DF	(France) FRA	Matthieu Sans	2	0	2	0	0	0	0	0
	DF	(France) FRA	Makonen Guillaume	4	0	4	0	0	0	0	0
19	DF	(France) FRA	Maka Mary	3	0	3	0	0	0	0	0
	DF	(France) FRA	Thierry N'Joh Eboa	5	0	5	0	0	0	0	0
13	MF	(France) FRA	Salim Moizini	7	1	7	1	0	0	0	0
	MF	(France) FRA	Anthony Arnaudo	1	0	1	0	0	0	0	0
	MF	(France) FRA	Matthias Llambrich	9	0	9	0	0	0	0	0
	MF	(Mali) MLI	Abdoulaye Keita	1	0	1	0	0	0	0	0
	MF	(France) FRA	Nabil Aankour	4	0	4	0	0	0	0	0
	MF	(France) FRA	Kévin Doncarli	2	0	2	0	0	0	0	0
23	MF	(France) FRA	Christophe Vincent	7	0	7	0	0	0	0	0
	FW	(France) FRA	Romain Acchili	9	1	9	1	0	0	0	0
	FW	(France) FRA	Taofik El-Faqyh	0	0	0	0	0	0	0	0
	FW	(France) FRA	Joris Correa	8	2	8	2	0	0	0	0
	FW	(France) FRA	François Massimi	7	1	7	1	0	0	0	0
	FW	(Mali) MLI	Famoussa Koné	4	1	4	1	0	0	0	0
9	FW	(France) FRA	Yassin El-Azzouzi	1	0	1	0	0	0	0	0
26	FW	(France) FRA	Gaëtan Varenne	5	2	5	2	0	0	0	0
	FW	(France) FRA	Joseph Barbato	4	3	4	3	0	0	0	0
Players who appeared for Bastia no longer at the club:
	MF	(France) FRA	Florent André	1	1	1	1	0	0	0	0
