= 2013–14 CA Bastia season =

CA Bastia
2013–14 season
- Chairman: Antoine Emmanuelli
- Head coach: Stéphane Rossi
- Stadium: Stade Armand-Cesari (Note: CA Bastia played their home matches at the Stade Armand Cesari, the home of SC Bastia, since their own stadium, Stade Erbajolo, did not meet the required standards to host Ligue 2 football.)
- Ligue 2: 20th (relegated)
- Coupe de France: Round of 16
- Coupe de la Ligue: First round

The 2013–14 season was the 74th season in the existence of CA Bastia and the club's first ever season in the second division of French football. In addition to the domestic league, CA Bastia participated in this season's editions of the Coupe de France and the Coupe de la Ligue.

== Players ==
=== First-team squad ===
As of 21 January 2014.

Note: Flags indicate national team as defined under FIFA eligibility rules; some limited exceptions apply. Players may hold more than one non-FIFA nationality.

No.	Pos.	Nation	Player
1	GK	FRA	Sébastien Lombard
3	DF	BFA	Ben Idrissa Dermé
4	DF	FRA	Adrien Monfray
5	MF	FRA	Jean-Christophe Lamberti
6	MF	FRA	Florent Marty
7	DF	FRA	Rémy Arnoux (captain)
8	DF	FRA	Yoann Oswald
9	MF	FRA	Alexandre Cropanese
10	MF	FRA	Jean-François Grimaldi
11	FW	FRA	Madimoussa Traoré
12	FW	GUI	Naby Damba
13	DF	FRA	Mickael Fourtier
14	FW	FRA	Jean-Jacques Mandrichi
15	DF	FRA	Mamadou Camara
16	GK	FRA	Antoine Philippon
17	MF	FRA	Christophe Vincent (on loan from SC Bastia)

No.	Pos.	Nation	Player
18	FW	FRA	Romain Pastorelli
19	FW	FRA	Alassane N'Diaye
20	DF	FRA	Michel Moretti
21	FW	FRA	Vincent Le Mat
22	MF	FRA	Nicolas Di Fraya
23	DF	FRA	Johann Truchet
25	DF	FRA	Anthony Salis
26	DF	FRA	Raphaël Romey
27	DF	FRA	Jérôme Phojo (on loan from Monaco)
28	MF	FRA	Salim Moizini
29	MF	FRA	Massiré Kanté
30	GK	FRA	Dominique Agostini
32	MF	BFA	Florent Rouamba
34	MF	NGR	Sunday Mba
35	DF	FRA	Clément Fabre (on loan from Tours)
39	FW	FRA	Jonathan Rivas (on loan from Châteauroux)

== Pre-season and friendlies ==
Win Draw Loss Fixtures

== Competitions ==
=== Overall record ===
Competition	First match	Last match	Starting round	Final position	Record							
Competition	First match	Last match	Starting round	Final position	Pld	W	D	L	GF	GA	GD	Win %
Ligue 2	4 August 2013	16 May 2014	Matchday 1	20th	38	4	12	22	21	63	−42	10.53
Coupe de France	16 November 2013	11 February 2014	Seventh round	Round of 16	5	2	2	1	10	7	+3	40.00
Coupe de la Ligue	7 August 2013		First round	First round	1	0	0	1	0	1	−1	0.00
Total					44	6	14	24	31	71	−40	13.64

Last updated: May 2014
Source: Soccerway

=== Ligue 2 ===
==== League table ====
Pos	Team	Pld	W	D	L	GF	GA	GD	Pts	Promotion or Relegation
16	Auxerre	38	10	13	15	35	45	−10	43	
17	Laval	38	10	12	16	44	52	−8	42	
18	Châteauroux	38	10	10	18	43	59	−16	40	Spared due to the DNCG’s rulings.
19	Istres (R)	38	9	9	20	48	74	−26	36	Relegated, but later readmitted and later relegated.
20	CA Bastia (R)	38	4	12	22	21	63	−42	24	Relegation to Championnat National

Source: Ligue 2
Rules for classification: 1) points; 2) goal difference; 3) number of goals scored.
(R) Relegated

==== Results summary ====
Overall								Home						Away					
Pld	W	D	L	GF	GA	GD	Pts	W	D	L	GF	GA	GD	W	D	L	GF	GA	GD
38	4	12	22	21	63	−42	24	2	9	8	15	29	−14	2	3	14	6	34	−28

Last updated: May 2014.
Source: Ligue 2

==== Results by round ====
Round	1	2	3	4	5	6	7	8	9	10	11	12	13	14	15	16	17	18	19	20	21	22	23	24	25	26	27	28	29	30	31	32	33	34	35	36	37	38
Ground	A	H	A	H	A	H	A	A	H	A	H	A	H	A	H	A	H	A	H	A	H	A	H	A	H	H	A	H	A	H	A	H	A	H	A	H	A	H
Result	L	L	D	D	L	D	L	L	D	L	L	L	D	W	L	D	L	L	L	W	D	L	L	L	L	D	L	W	L	W	L	D	L	D	L	D	D	L
Position	16	17	15	15	19	20	20	20	20	20	20	20	20	20	20	20	20	20	20	20	20	20	20	20	20	20	20	20	20	20	20	20	20	20	20	20	20	20

Source: Ligue 2
A = Away; H = Home; W = Win; D = Draw; L = Loss

==== Matches ====
The league fixtures were announced on 13 June 2013.

4 August 2013 1	Lens	1–0	CA Bastia	Lens
17:30 CEST (UTC+2)				Stadium: Stade Bollaert-Delelis

10 August 2013 2	CA Bastia	1–2	Nancy	Furiani
17:30 CEST (UTC+2)				Stadium: Stade Armand-Cesari

16 August 2013 3	Istres	1–1	CA Bastia	Istres
17:30 CEST (UTC+2)				Stadium: Stade Parsemain

23 August 2013 4	CA Bastia	1–1	Angers	Furiani
17:30 CEST (UTC+2)				Stadium: Stade Armand-Cesari

30 August 2013 5	Châteauroux	2–0	CA Bastia	Châteauroux
17:30 CEST (UTC+2)				Stadium: Stade Gaston Petit

13 September 2013 6	CA Bastia	0–0	Dijon	Furiani
17:30 CEST (UTC+2)				Stadium: Stade Armand-Cesari

20 September 2013 7	Brest	2–0	CA Bastia	Brest
17:30 CEST (UTC+2)				Stadium: Stade Francis-Le Blé

24 September 2013 8	Auxerre	1–0	CA Bastia	Auxerre
17:30 CEST (UTC+2)				Stadium: Stade de l'Abbé-Deschamps

27 September 2013 9	CA Bastia	1–1	Laval	Furiani
17:30 CEST (UTC+2)				Stadium: Stade Armand-Cesari

4 October 2013 10	Troyes	6–1	CA Bastia	Troyes
17:30 CEST (UTC+2)				Stadium: Stade de l'Aube

18 October 2013 11	CA Bastia	1–2	Tours	Furiani
17:30 CEST (UTC+2)				Stadium: Stade Armand-Cesari

25 October 2013 12	Créteil	3–0	CA Bastia	Créteil
17:30 CEST (UTC+2)				Stadium: Stade Dominique Duvauchelle

1 November 2013 13	CA Bastia	0–0	Le Havre	Furiani
17:30 CET (UTC+1)				Stadium: Stade Armand-Cesari

8 November 2013 14	Nîmes	0–1	CA Bastia	Nîmes
17:30 CEST (UTC+2)				Stadium: Stade des Costières

22 November 2013 15	CA Bastia	0–2	Metz	Furiani
17:30 CET (UTC+1)				Stadium: Stade Armand-Cesari

29 November 2013 16	Arles-Avignon	0–0	CA Bastia	Avignon
17:30 CEST (UTC+2)				Stadium: Parc des Sports

13 December 2013 17	CA Bastia	1–5	Caen	Furiani
17:30 CET (UTC+1)				Stadium: Stade Armand-Cesari

20 December 2013 18	Clermont	2–0	CA Bastia	Clermont-Ferrand
17:30 CEST (UTC+2)				Stadium: Stade Gabriel Montpied

10 January 2014 19	CA Bastia	0–3	Niort	Furiani
17:30 CET (UTC+1)				Stadium: Stade Armand-Cesari

17 January 2014 20	Nancy	0–1	CA Bastia	Tomblaine
17:30 CEST (UTC+2)				Stadium: Stade Marcel Picot

24 January 2014 21	CA Bastia	2–2	Istres	Furiani
17:30 CET (UTC+1)				Stadium: Stade Armand-Cesari

31 January 2014 22	Angers	1–0	CA Bastia	Angers
17:30 CEST (UTC+2)				Stadium: Stade Jean Bouin

7 February 2014 23	CA Bastia	1–4	Châteauroux	Furiani
17:30 CET (UTC+1)				Stadium: Stade Armand-Cesari

14 February 2014 24	Dijon	3–0	CA Bastia	Dijon
17:30 CEST (UTC+2)				Stadium: Stade Gaston Gérard

24 February 2014 25	CA Bastia	0–1	Brest	Furiani
17:30 CET (UTC+1)				Stadium: Stade Armand-Cesari

28 February 2014 26	CA Bastia	0–0	Auxerre	Furiani
17:30 CET (UTC+1)				Stadium: Stade Armand-Cesari

7 March 2014 27	Laval	2–0	CA Bastia	Laval
17:30 CEST (UTC+2)				Stadium: Stade Francis Le Basser

14 March 2014 28	CA Bastia	1–0	Troyes	Furiani
17:30 CET (UTC+1)				Stadium: Stade Armand-Cesari

21 March 2014 29	Tours	1–0	CA Bastia	Tours
17:30 CEST (UTC+2)				Stadium: Stade de la Vallée du Cher

28 March 2014 30	CA Bastia	3–1	Créteil	Furiani
17:30 CET (UTC+1)				Stadium: Stade Armand-Cesari

4 April 2014 31	Le Havre	1–0	CA Bastia	Le Havre
17:30 CEST (UTC+2)				Stadium: Stade Océane

11 April 2014 32	CA Bastia	0–0	Nîmes	Furiani
17:30 CET (UTC+1)				Stadium: Stade Armand-Cesari

18 April 2014 33	Metz	1–0	CA Bastia	Metz
17:30 CEST (UTC+2)				Stadium: Stade Saint-Symphorien

25 April 2014 34	CA Bastia	2–2	Arles-Avignon	Furiani
17:30 CET (UTC+1)				Stadium: Stade Armand-Cesari

2 May 2014 35	Caen	6–1	CA Bastia	Caen
17:30 CEST (UTC+2)				Stadium: Stade Michel d'Ornano

6 May 2014 36	CA Bastia	1–1	Clermont	Furiani
17:30 CET (UTC+1)				Stadium: Stade Armand-Cesari

9 May 2014 37	Niort	1–1	CA Bastia	Niort
17:30 CEST (UTC+2)				Stadium: Stade René Gaillard

16 May 2014 38	CA Bastia	0–2	Lens	Furiani
17:30 CET (UTC+1)				Stadium: Stade Armand-Cesari

=== Coupe de France ===
16 November 2013 Seventh round	Avant-Garde de Plouvorn	1–1 (4–5 p)	CA Bastia
17:30 CET (UTC+1)

7 December 2013 Eighth round	Chassieu Decines FC	0–2	CA Bastia
17:30 CET (UTC+1)

4 January 2014 Round of 64	La Roche VF	0–3 (a.e.t.)	CA Bastia	La Roche-sur-Yon
17:30 CET (UTC+1)				Stadium: Stade Henri Desgrange

21 January 2014 Round of 32	CA Bastia	2–2 (a.e.t.) (5–4 p)	Niort	Furiani
20:00 CET (UTC+1)	Camara 35'; Mba 89'		Lafourcade 73' (pen.); Oswald 85' (o.g.)	Stadium: Stade Armand-Cesari
	Penalties
	Cropanese (penalty scored); Di Fraya (penalty scored); Vincent (penalty scored); Mba (penalty scored); N'Diaye (penalty scored)		(penalty scored) Bernard; (penalty scored) Pallois; (penalty scored) Roye; (penalty scored) Sala; (penalty missed) Glombard

11 February 2014 Round of 16	Angers	4–2 (a.e.t.)	CA Bastia	Angers
20:00 CET (UTC+1)	Ayari 57'; Diers 105+2'; Yattara 113'; Blayac 117'		Mba 30', 105'	Stadium: Stade Jean-Bouin; Attendance: 6,401; Referee: Olivier Thual

=== Coupe de la Ligue ===
7 August 2013 First round	CA Bastia	0–1	Arles-Avignon	Furiani
20:00 CEST (UTC+2)			Omrani 45+3'	Stadium: Stade Armand Cesari; Attendance: 1,981; Referee: Nicolas Rainville
