= List of French football transfers summer 2013 =

This is a list of French football transfers in the summer transfer window 2013 by club. Only transfers of Ligue 1 are included.

== FC Girondins de Bordeaux ==
In:

Out:

No.	Pos.	Nation	Player
5	DF	FRA	Jérémie Bréchet (from Troyes)
15	DF	SRB	Vujadin Savić (loan return from Dynamo Dresden)
20	MF	BRA	Jussiê (loan return from Al Wasl)
21	DF	FRA	Matthieu Chalmé (loan return from Ajaccio)
23	DF	ARG	Lucas Orban (from Tigre)
--	FW	FRA	Anthony Modeste (loan return from Bastia)

No.	Pos.	Nation	Player
--	GK	FRA	Abdoulaye Keita (released)
--	DF	FRA	Florian Marange (to Crystal Palace)
--	FW	FRA	Anthony Modeste (to TSG Hoffenheim)
--	DF	FRA	Benoît Trémoulinas (to Dynamo Kyiv)

== HSC Montpellier ==
In:

No.	Pos.	Nation	Player
5	DF	CIV	Siaka Tiéné (from PSG)
13	MF	FRA	Morgan Sanson (from Le Mans)
15	MF	FRA	Jonathan Tinhan (loan return from AC Arles-Avignon)
24	FW	FRA	Bengali-Fodé Koita (loan return from Le Havre)
28	FW	FRA	Djamel Bakar (from Nancy)
29	FW	COL	Victor Montaño (from Rennes)

Out:

No.	Pos.	Nation	Player
--	DF	FRA	Cyril Jeunechamp (released)
--	MF	FRA	Romain Pitau (released)
--	FW	NGR	John Utaka (to Sivasspor)
--	MF	CHI	Marco Estrada (to Al Wahda)
--	MF	MAR	Younès Belhanda (to Dynamo Kyiv)
--	DF	CMR	Henri Bedimo (to Lyon)
--	FW	FRA	Gaëtan Charbonnier (to Reims)

== FC Nantes ==
In:

No.	Pos.	Nation	Player
6	DF	VEN	Gabriel Cichero (from Caracas FC)
10	FW	VEN	Fernando Aristeguieta (from Caracas FC)
--	DF	VEN	Oswaldo Vizcarrondo (from Club América)
--	FW	GUI	Ismaël Bangoura (loan return from Umm Salal)
--	MF	USA	Alejandro Bedoya (from Helsingborg)

Out:

No.	Pos.	Nation	Player
--	MF	MLI	Ismaël Keïta (to Angers)
--	FW	KOR	Lee Yong-Jae (to Red Star 93)
--	DF	FRA	Karim Djellabi (to Auxerre)
--	DF	ALG	Ahmed Madouni (released)

== Olympique Lyon ==
In:

No.	Pos.	Nation	Player
3	DF	CMR	Henri Bedimo (from Montpellier)
13	DF	POR	Miguel Lopes (on loan from Sporting)
20	MF	FRA	Gael Danic (from Valenciennes)
22	MF	MLI	Sidy Koné (loan return from Caen)
36	FW	FRA	Harry Novillo (loan return from Gazelec Ajaccio)
39	FW	GUI	Mohamed Yattara (loan return from Troyes)
40	GK	BEL	Théo Defourny (loan return from FC Rouen)
--	DF	ARG	Fabián Monzón (loan return from Fluminense)

Out

No.	Pos.	Nation	Player
--	DF	FRA	Anthony Reveillere (end of contract)
--	DF	CRO	Dejan Lovren (to Southampton)
--	DF	ARG	Fabián Monzón (to Catania)
--	FW	ARG	Lisandro López (to Al-Gharafa)

== OSC Lille ==
In:

No.	Pos.	Nation	Player
1	GK	NGR	Vincent Enyeama (loan return from Maccabi Tel Aviv)
6	MF	FRA	Jonathan Delaplace (from Zulte Waregem)
7	FW	CRC	John Jairo Ruiz (loan return from Royal Mouscron-Péruwelz)
12	MF	FRA	Souahilo Meite (loan return from Auxerre)
14	DF	DEN	Simon Kjær (from Wolfsburg)
21	DF	FRA	Julian Jeanvier (from Nancy)
23	DF	SEN	Pape Souaré (loan return from Reims)
--	GK	FRA	Alexandre Oukidja (loan return from Royal Mouscron-Péruwelz)
--	MF	FRA	Arnaud Souquet (loan return from Royal Mouscron-Péruwelz)
--	MF	BEL	Viktor Klonaridis (loan return from Royal Mouscron-Péruwelz)
--	MF	FRA	Florian Thauvin (loan return from Bastia)
--	FW	FRA	Abdoulaye Diaby (from Sedan)

Out

No.	Pos.	Nation	Player
--	DF	CMR	Aurelien Chedjou (to Galatasaray)
--	DF	FRA	Laurent Bonnart (to Ajaccio)
--	MF	FRA	Dimitri Payet (to Marseille)
--	FW	BEL	Gianni Bruno (on loan to Bastia)
--	DF	FRA	Lucas Digne (to Paris Saint-Germain)
--	MF	FRA	Benoit Pedretti (to Ajaccio)
--	FW	FRA	Abdoulaye Diaby (on loan to Royal Mouscron-Péruwelz)

== AC Ajaccio ==
In:

No.	Pos.	Nation	Player
2	DF	FRA	Cédric Hengbart (from Auxerre)
3	DF	VEN	Grenddy Perozo (from Deportivo Táchira)
5	DF	ITA	Denis Tonucci (from Cesena)
17	DF	FRA	Laurent Bonnart (from Lille)
21	FW	ALG	Salim Arrache (from Asteras Tripolis)
--	MF	FRA	Benoit Pedretti (from Lille)

Out

No.	Pos.	Nation	Player
--	DF	FRA	Yoann Poulard (retired)
--	DF	MLI	Fousseni Diawara (to Tours)
--	DF	FRA	Anthony Lippini (to Clermont)
--	MF	FRA	Damien Tibéri (to Laval)
--	GK	FRA	David Oberhauser (released)
--	FW	FRA	David Gigliotti (released)
--	DF	FRA	Matthieu Chalmé (on loan to Bordeaux)
--	MF	FRA	Johan Cavalli (released)
--	DF	FRA	Mickael Charvet (to Paris FC)
--	DF	BRA	Felipe Saad (to Caen)
--	MF	FRA	Karim El Hany (to FC Brussels)
--	DF	FRA	Samuel Bouhours (to Tours)
--	FW	FRA	Andy Delort (to Tours)
--	MF	FRA	Frédéric Sammaritano (to Auxerre)
--	DF	FRA	Arnaud Maire (to Carquefou)

== FC Lorient ==
In:

No.	Pos.	Nation	Player
35	DF	FRA	Raphaël Guerreiro (from Caen)
36	MF	FRA	Cheick Doukouré (loan return from Èpinal)
37	DF	FRA	Simon Falette (loan return from Laval)
38	MF	FRA	Rémi Mulumba (loan return from Dijon)
39	FW	CMR	Vincent Aboubakar (from Valenciennes)
--	FW	SUI	Innocent Emeghara (loan return from Siena)

Out

No.	Pos.	Nation	Player
--	MF	FRA	Ludovic Giuly (retired)
--	GK	FRA	Florent Chaigneau (on loan to Caen)
--	FW	FRA	Julien Toudic (released)
--	DF	FRA	Arnaud Le Lan (retired)
--	DF	ARG	Lucas Mareque (released)
--	FW	ENG	Ryan Mason (loan return to Tottenham)
--	MF	GHA	Mohammed Abu (loan return to Manchester City)
--	FW	SUI	Innocent Emeghara (to Siena)
--	MF	FRA	Benjamin Corgnet (to Saint-Étienne)

== Stade Reims ==
In:

No.	Pos.	Nation	Player
--	FW	FRA	Jonathan Kodjia (loan return from Amiens)
8	MF	COD	Prince Oniangue (from Tours)
9	FW	ISR	Eliran Atar (from Maccabi Tel Aviv)
17	MF	DEN	Mads Albaek (from Midtjylland)
--	FW	FRA	Gaëtan Charbonnier (from Montpellier)

Out

No.	Pos.	Nation	Player
--	GK	FRA	Johan Liébus (retired)
--	FW	FRA	Jonathan Kodjia (on loan to Caen)
--	FW	FRA	Julien Toudic (on loan to Lens)
--	DF	SEN	Pape Souaré (loan return to Lille)
--	MF	FRA	Johann Ramaré (to Brest)
--	FW	FRA	Nicolas Fauvergue (to Metz)

== FC Valenciennes ==
In:

Out:

No.	Pos.	Nation	Player
4	MF	CAF	Eloge Enza Yamissi (from Troyes)
8	MF	ROU	Aurelian Chițu (from Viitorul Constanța)
9	FW	FRA	Jean-Christophe Bahebeck (from Paris Saint-Germain)
16	GK	BRA	Macedo Novaes (from Bastia)
--	MF	FRA	Tongo Doumbia (from Wolverhampton)

No.	Pos.	Nation	Player
--	FW	CMR	Vincent Aboubakar (to Lorient)
--	MF	COL	Carlos Sánchez (to Elche)
--	MF	FRA	Rémi Gomis (released)
--	MF	FRA	Younousse Sankharé (loan return to Dijon)
--	GK	FRA	Jean-Louis Leca (to Bastia)
--	MF	FRA	Gaël Danic (to Lyon)
--	DF	CMR	Gaëtan Bong (to Olympiacos)

== EA Guingamp ==
In:

No.	Pos.	Nation	Player
8	MF	GUA	Claudio Beauvue (from Châteauroux)
11	MF	FRA	Steeven Langil (from Auxerre)
12	MF	FRA	Younousse Sankharé (from Dijon)
15	DF	FRA	Jérémy Sorbon (from Caen)
16	GK	CMR	Guy N'dy Assembé (from Nancy)

Out

No.	Pos.	Nation	Player
--	MF	FRA	François Bellugou (to Nancy)
--	MF	FRA	Charly Charrier (to Vendée Luçon)
--	GK	FRA	Vincent Planté (to Red Star 93)
--	DF	FRA	Mamadou Camara (to CA Bastia)

== FC Sochaux-Montbéliard ==
In:

No.	Pos.	Nation	Player
25	DF	FRA	Julien Faussurier (from Troyes)
--	FW	GUI	Abdoul Camara (loan return from PAOK)

Out

No.	Pos.	Nation	Player
--	DF	SEN	Omar Daf (retired)
--	DF	TUN	Yassin Mikari (to Luzern)
--	DF	FRA	Frédéric Duplus (to Zulte Waregem)
--	FW	NGR	King Osanga (to R. White Star Bruxelles)
--	GK	GAB	Didier Ovono (released)
--	FW	GHA	Ishmael Yartey (on loan to Sion)
--	FW	CIV	Giovanni Sio (loan return to Wolfsburg)
--	DF	FRA	Christophe Hérelle (on loan to SR Colmar)

== AS Monaco ==
In:

No.	Pos.	Nation	Player
2	DF	BRA	Fabinho (from Rio Ave)
6	DF	POR	Ricardo Carvalho (from Real Madrid)
9	FW	COL	Radamel Falcao (from Atlético Madrid)
10	MF	COL	James Rodríguez (from Porto)
16	FW	MAR	Nacer Barazite (loan return from Austria Wien)
20	DF	FRA	Nicolas Isimat-Mirin (from Valenciennes)
22	DF	FRA	Eric Abidal (from FC Barcelona)
23	FW	FRA	Anthony Martial (from Lyon)
26	MF	POR	João Moutinho (from Porto)
28	MF	FRA	Jeremy Toulalan (from Malaga CF)
--	MF	CGO	Chris Malonga (loan return from Lausanne-Sport)
--	MF	GRE	Alexandros Tziolis (loan return from APOEL Nikosia)
--	DF	ESP	Borja López (from Sporting de Gijón)
--	GK	ARG	Sergio Romero
--	MF	FRA	Geoffrey Kondogbia (from Sevilla FC)

Out

No.	Pos.	Nation	Player
--	MF	FRA	Nampalys Mendy (to Nice)
--	FW	URU	Sebastián Ribas (loan return to Genoa)
--	MF	FRA	Dennis Appiah (to Caen)
--	MF	SWE	Emir Bajrami (loan return to Panathinaikos)
--	MF	FRA	Stephane Dumont (released)
--	DF	ALG	Carl Medjani (to Olympiacos)
--	FW	CMR	Edgar Salli (to Lens)
--	MF	FRA	Tristan Dingomé (to Le Havre)
--	DF	BRA	Adriano (released)
--	MF	GRE	Alexandros Tziolis (on loan to PAOK)

== Olympique Marseille ==
In:

No.	Pos.	Nation	Player
11	MF	FRA	Dimitri Payet (from OSC Lille)
22	DF	FRA	Benjamin Mendy (from Le Havre AC)
25	MF	FRA	Giannelli Imbula (from Guingamp)
14	MF	FRA	Florian Thauvin (from OSC Lille)
29	FW	TUN	Saber Khelifa (from Évian)

Out

No.	Pos.	Nation	Player
--	FW	FRA	Florian Raspentino (on loan to Bastia)
--	MF	ENG	Joey Barton (loan return to Queens Park Rangers)
--	DF	CMR	Leyti N'Diaye (released)
--	FW	SEN	Modou Sougou (on loan to Évian)

== Stade Rennais FC ==
In:

No.	Pos.	Nation	Player
20	FW	POR	Nélson Oliveira (on loan from Benfica)
22	DF	FRA	Sylvain Armand (from Paris Saint-Germain)
--	DF	MAR	Yassine Jebbour (from Nancy)
--	MF	ALG	Yacine Brahimi (loan return from Granada)
--	MF	CMR	Jean Makoun (loan return from Aston Villa)
--	FW	NED	John Verhoek (loan return from FSV Frankfurt)
--	GK	FRA	Johann Carrasso (loan return from Metz)
--	DF	ROU	Valerica Gaman (from Astra Giurgiu)

Out

No.	Pos.	Nation	Player
--	MF	FRA	Alou Diarra (loan return to West Ham)
--	MF	ALG	Yacine Brahimi (to Granada)
--	DF	COD	Hérita Ilunga (released)
--	DF	SEN	John Mensah (released)
--	FW	COL	Victor Montaño (to Montpellier)
--	FW	NED	John Verhoek (on loan to St.Pauli)
--	DF	FRA	Chris Mavinga (to Rubin Kazan)
--	GK	FRA	Johann Carrasso (to Metz)

== FC Toulouse ==
In:

No.	Pos.	Nation	Player
15	DF	SRB	Uroš Spajić (from Red Star Belgrade)
18	MF	ARG	Óscar Trejo (from Sporting de Gijón)
--	MF	ROU	Mihai Roman (from Rapid Bukarest)

Out

No.	Pos.	Nation	Player
--	MF	FRA	Adrien Rabiot (loan return to Paris Saint-Germain)
--	FW	POR	Yannick Djaló (loan return to Benfica)
--	FW	TUR	Umut Bulut (to Galatasaray)
--	MF	FRA	Franck Tabanou (to Saint-Etienne)
--	FW	NOR	Daniel Braaten (released)
--	MF	MAR	Adil Hermach (to Al-Hilal)
--	MF	FRA	Etienne Capoue (to Tottenham)

== OGC Nice ==
In:

No.	Pos.	Nation	Player
10	MF	FRA	Nampalys Mendy (from AS Monaco)
21	MF	BEL	Christian Brüls (on loan from Gent)

Out

No.	Pos.	Nation	Player
--	DF	ARG	Renato Civelli (to Bursaspor)
--	MF	FRA	Camel Meriem (released)
--	FW	FRA	Kévin Diaz (released)

== Paris Saint-Germain ==
In:

No.	Pos.	Nation	Player
4	MF	MLI	Mohamed Sissoko (loan return from Fiorentina)
5	DF	BRA	Marquinhos (from Roma)
9	FW	URU	Edinson Cavani (from Napoli)
12	MF	FRA	Mathieu Bodmer (loan return from Saint-Étienne)
15	DF	URU	Diego Lugano (loan return from Málaga)
21	DF	FRA	Lucas Digne (from Lille)
25	MF	FRA	Adrien Rabiot (loan return from Toulouse)
--	FW	HAI	Jean-Eudes Maurice (loan return from Le Mans)

Out

No.	Pos.	Nation	Player
--	MF	ENG	David Beckham (retired)
--	GK	FRA	Ronan Le Crom (retired)
--	DF	FRA	Jean-Christophe Bahebeck (on loan to Valenciennes)
--	DF	FRA	Sylvain Armand (to Stade Rennes)
--	DF	CIV	Siaka Tiéné (to Montpellier)
--	FW	FRA	Kevin Gameiro (to Sevilla)
--	DF	URU	Diego Lugano (to West Bromwich)
--	GK	FRA	Alphonse Areola (on loan to Lens)

== SC Bastia ==
In:

No.	Pos.	Nation	Player
5	DF	FRA	Sébastien Squillaci (from Arsenal)
9	FW	BEL	Gianni Bruno (on loan from Lille)
12	DF	FRA	Florent André (loan return from Étoile Fréjus Saint-Raphaël)
14	FW	FRA	Ludovic Genest (from Istres)
16	GK	FRA	Jean-Louis Leca (from Valenciennes)
17	FW	FRA	Florian Raspentino (on loan from Marseille)
19	MF	MTN	Adama Ba (from Brest)
--	DF	MLI	Drissa Diakité (from Olympiacos)
--	DF	FRA	François Modesto (from Olympiacos)
--	FW	ROU	Claudiu Keserü (from Angers)
--	MF	CIV	Romaric (from Zaragoza)

Out

No.	Pos.	Nation	Player
--	DF	FRA	Sylvain Marchal (to Metz)
--	MF	FRA	Jérôme Rothen (to Caen)
--	DF	GHA	Samuel Inkoom (to Dniester Ovidiopol)
--	DF	FRA	Olivier Vannucci (to GFCO Ajaccio)
--	GK	FRA	Landry Bonnefoi (to Châteauroux)
--	DF	FRA	Jacques Faty (to Sivasspor)
--	DF	FRA	Gaël Angoula (to Angers)
--	FW	FRA	Anthony Modeste (to TSG Hoffenheim)
--	GK	BRA	Macedo Novaes (to Valenciennes)
--	DF	FRA	Lucas Mareque (released)
--	GK	FRA	Christophe Vincent (on loan to CA Bastia)
--	MF	FRA	Dominique Agostini (to CA Bastia)
--	DF	FRA	Jérémy Choplin (to Metz)

== AS Saint-Étienne ==
In:

No.	Pos.	Nation	Player
2	FW	CIV	Ibrahim Sissoko (on loan from Wolfsburg)
5	MF	FRA	Franck Tabanou (from Toulouse)
11	MF	FRA	Benjamin Corgnet (on Lorient)
21	FW	FRA	Yoric Ravet (loan return on Angers)
23	DF	FRA	Paul Baysse (on Brest)
27	DF	FRA	Florentin Pogba (loan return on Sedan)
--	FW	FRA	Idriss Saadi (loan return on Gazélec Ajaccio)
--	FW	FRA	Lynel Kitambala (loan return on Dynamo Dresden)

Out

No.	Pos.	Nation	Player
--	FW	GAB	Pierre-Emerick Aubameyang (to Borussia Dortmund)
--	MF	FRA	Mathieu Bodmer (loan return to Paris Saint-Germain)
--	FW	FRA	Yohan Mollo (loan return to Nancy)
--	FW	FRA	Lynel Kitambala (on loan to Auxerre)
--	FW	DEN	Andreas Laudrup (loan return to Nordsjælland)

== FC Évian Thonon Gaillard ==
In:

No.	Pos.	Nation	Player
7	MF	ARG	Facundo Bertoglio (on loan from Dynamo Kyiv)
10	MF	FRA	Nicolas Benezet (from Nîmes)
23	MF	COL	Andres Escobar (on loan from Dynamo Kyiv)
--	FW	SEN	Modou Sougou (on loan from Marseille)
--	FW	ARG	Marco Rubén (on loan from Dynamo Kyiv)
--	GK	DEN	Jesper Hansen (from Nordsjælland)
--	MF	ROU	Dan Nistor (from CS Pandurii Targu Jiu)

Out

No.	Pos.	Nation	Player
--	GK	DEN	Stephan Andersen (to Real Betis)
--	MF	FRA	Guillaume Lacour (to Troyes)
--	FW	FRA	Sidney Govou (released)
--	FW	FRA	Hervé Bugnet (released)
--	FW	FRA	Youssef Adnane (released)
--	DF	TUN	Iheb Mbarki (to Espérance)
--	MF	SRB	Miloš Ninković (loan return to Dynamo Kyiv)
--	FW	BRA	Diogo Campos (loan return to Goianiense)
--	FW	FRA	Yannick Sagbo (to Hull City)
--	FW	TUN	Saber Khelifa (to Olympique Marseille)
--	DF	BRA	Betão (to AA Ponte Preta)
--	FW	FRA	Ali M'Madi (on loan to GFC Ajaccio)
