= List of French football transfers winter 2012 =

This is a list of French football transfers for the 2012 winter transfer window. The winter transfer window opened on 1 January 2012, although a few transfers took place prior to that date, and closed at midnight on 31 January 2012. Only moves involving Ligue 1 and Ligue 2 clubs are listed. Players without a club may join one at any time, either during or in between transfer windows.

== Transfers ==
Date	Name	Moving from	Moving to	Fee
8 December 2011	(Ghana) Bennard Yao Kumordzi	(Greece) Panionios	Dijon	Undisclosed
20 December 2011	(France) Hakeem Achour	Ivry	Dijon	Undisclosed
21 December 2011	(France) Ludovic Delporte	(Spain) Gimnàstic de Tarragona	Angers	Free
29 December 2011	(France) Sébastien Puygrenier	(Russia) Zenit Saint Petersburg	Nancy	Loan
29 December 2011	(Brazil) Mariano	(Brazil) Fluminense	Bordeaux	€3m
29 December 2011	(France) Abel Khaled	Épinal	Brest	Undisclosed
1 January 2012	(Ivory Coast) Emmanuel Koné	(Romania) Cluj	Sedan	Free
2 January 2012	(France) Yohan Mollo	(Spain) Granada	Nancy	Loan
2 January 2012	(Ivory Coast) Koro Issa Koné	(Slovakia) Spartak Trnava	Dijon	Undisclosed
2 January 2012	(France) Aurélien Montaroup	(Belarus) Dinamo Minsk	Caen	Undisclosed
3 January 2012	(Brazil) Eduardo	Lens	Ajaccio	Undisclosed
3 January 2012	(France) Christophe Mandanne	Dijon	Guingamp	Loan
4 January 2012	(Ivory Coast) Daniel Yeboah	(Ivory Coast) ASEC Mimosas	Dijon	Free
4 January 2012	(France) Alexandre Cuvillier	Nancy	Lens	Loan
5 January 2012	(Denmark) Thomas Kahlenberg	(Germany) VfL Wolfsburg	Evian	Loan
5 January 2012	(Greece) Andreas Govas	(Greece) Kavala	Troyes	Free
6 January 2012	(Senegal) Moustapha Bayal Sall	Saint-Étienne	Nancy	Loan
9 January 2012	(France) Jonathan Roufosse	Cannes	Arles-Avignon	Free
9 January 2012	(France) Mamadou Mara	Dijon	Arles-Avignon	Free
9 January 2012	(France) Quentin Pereira	Sochaux	Reims	Free
10 January 2012	(France) Loïck Landre	Paris Saint-Germain	Clermont	Loan
10 January 2012	(France) Maurice Dalé	Nantes	Arles-Avignon	Loan
10 January 2012	(France) Idriss Saadi	Saint-Étienne	Reims	Loan
10 January 2012	(Mali) Mohamed Yattara	Lyon	Arles-Avignon	Loan
11 January 2012	(Guinea) Richard Soumah	Brest	Angers	Loan
11 January 2012	(France) Gaël Kakuta	(England) Chelsea	Dijon	Loan
12 January 2012	(Brazil) Maxwell	(Spain) Barcelona	Paris Saint-Germain	€7m
12 January 2012	(Senegal) Pape Abdou Camara	(Belgium) Standard Liège	Valenciennes	Undisclosed
12 January 2012	(Sweden) Dusan Djurić	(Switzerland) Zürich	Valenciennes	Undisclosed
12 January 2012	(Ivory Coast) Zie Diabaté	(Romania) Dinamo București	Dijon	Undisclosed
12 January 2012	(Poland) Ludovic Obraniak	Lille	Bordeaux	Undisclosed
13 January 2012	(France) Ronan Le Crom	Nancy	Paris Saint-Germain	Free
16 January 2012	(Ivory Coast) Thierry Doubai	(Italy) Udinese	Sochaux	Loan
17 January 2012	(France) Grégory Cerdan	Unattached	Guingamp	Free
17 January 2012	(France) Kévin Anin	Sochaux	Nice	Undisclosed
17 January 2012	(Cameroon) Yaya Banana	(Tunisia) Espérance	Sochaux	Undisclosed
18 January 2012	(France) Benjamin Morel	Caen	Clermont	Free
18 January 2012	(Mali) Abdoulwhaid Sissoko	(Italy) Udinese	Brest	Loan
18 January 2012	(Senegal) Massamba Sambou	Unattached	Châteauroux	Free
18 January 2012	(France) Stéphane Besle	(Switzerland) Neuchâtel Xamax	Metz	Free
18 January 2012	(Serbia) Danijel Aleksić	(Italy) Genoa	Saint-Étienne	Free
19 January 2012	(Uruguay) Gary Kagelmacher	(Belgium) Beerschot	AS Monaco	Undisclosed
20 January 2012	(France) Nolan Roux	Brest	Lille	€8m
20 January 2012	(Costa Rica) John Jairo Ruiz	(Costa Rica) Saprissa	Lille	Undisclosed
21 January 2012	(France) Mehdi Courgnaud	Dijon	Arles-Avignon	Loan
23 January 2012	(Germany) Andreas Wolf	(Germany) Werder Bremen	AS Monaco	Undisclosed
23 January 2012	(Brazil) Felipe Saad	Evian	Ajaccio	Free
23 January 2012	(France) Olivier Kapo	(Qatar) Al Ahli	Auxerre	Free
25 January 2012	(France) Thierry Steimetz	Amnéville	Metz	Undisclosed
25 January 2012	(France) Alexandre Alphonse	(Switzerland) Zürich	Brest	Undisclosed
25 January 2012	(Turkey) Mevlüt Erdinç	Paris Saint-Germain	Rennes	€7.5m
26 January 2012	(France) Jonathan Lacourt	Bastia	Châteauroux	Free
26 January 2012	(France) Guillaume Loriot	Valenciennes	Boulogne	Free
26 January 2012	(Argentina) Mauro Cetto	(Italy) Palermo	Lille	Loan
26 January 2012	(France) Vincent Acapandié	Auxerre	Arles-Avignon	Loan
26 January 2012	(Senegal) Lamine Gassama	Lyon	Lorient	Undisclosed
26 January 2012	(Niger) Ouwo Moussa Maazou	(Russia) CSKA Moscow	Le Mans	Loan
26 January 2012	(France) Serge Aurier	Lens	Toulouse	Undisclosed
26 January 2012	(Senegal) Ibrahima Touré	(United Arab Emirates) Ajman Club	AS Monaco	Undisclosed
26 January 2012	(Netherlands) Nacer Barazite	Austria Wien	AS Monaco	Free
27 January 2012	(Brazil) Alex	(England) Chelsea	Paris Saint-Germain	€5m
27 January 2012	(France) Jimmy Mainfroi	Unattached	Amiens	Free
27 January 2012	(Republic of the Congo) Ladislas Douniama	Guingamp	Lorient	Free
28 January 2012	(Croatia) Danijel Subašić	(Croatia) Hajduk Split	AS Monaco	Undisclosed
28 January 2012	(France) Elliot Grandin	(England) Blackpool	Angers	Loan
30 January 2012	(Democratic Republic of the Congo) Distel Zola	Nancy	Le Havre	Loan
30 January 2012	(Nigeria) King Osanga	(Tunisia) Étoile du Sahel	Sochaux	Undisclosed
30 January 2012	(Ivory Coast) Marc Zoro	(Portugal) Benfica	Angers	Free
30 January 2012	(Portugal) Stanislas Oliveira	Sedan	Boulogne	Undisclosed
30 January 2012	(France) Bengali-Fodé Koita	Montpellier	Lens	Loan
30 January 2012	(Tunisia) Ammar Jemal	(Switzerland) Young Boys	AS Monaco	Undisclosed
31 January 2012	(Senegal) Diafra Sakho	Metz	Boulogne	Loan
31 January 2012	(Cameroon) Georges Mandjeck	Rennes	Auxerre	Undisclosed
31 January 2012	(Greece) Alexandros Tziolis	(Spain) Racing de Santander	AS Monaco	Undisclosed
31 January 2012	(Morocco) Nabil Dirar	(Belgium) Club Brugge	AS Monaco	€7.5m
31 January 2012	(France) Andy Delort	Ajaccio	Metz	Loan
31 January 2012	(France) Damien Le Tallec	(Germany) Borussia Dortmund	Nantes	Undisclosed
31 January 2012	(France) Jonathan Brison	Nancy	Saint-Étienne	€300k
31 January 2012	(New Caledonia) Wesley Lautoa	Sedan	Lorient	Undisclosed
31 January 2012	(France) Billy Ketkeophomphone	(Switzerland) Sion	Tours	Free
31 January 2012	(France) David Gigliotti	Arles-Avignon	Ajaccio	Free
31 January 2012	(Italy) Thiago Motta	(Italy) Internazionale	Paris Saint-Germain	€10m
31 January 2012	(Greece) Giorgios Tzavelas	(Germany) Eintracht Frankfurt	AS Monaco	Undisclosed
31 January 2012	(Hungary) Vladimir Koman	(Italy) Sampdoria	AS Monaco	Undisclosed
31 January 2012	(France) Mamadou Wague	Le Mans	Metz	Free

- ^1 Player who signed with club before 1 January officially joined his new club on 1 January 2012, while player who joined after 1 January joined his new club following his signature of the contract.
