= Barbato =

Barbato is an Italian surname. Notable people with the surname include:

- Andrea Barbato (1934–1996), Italian journalist, politician, author and screenwriter
- Elisabetta Barbato (1921–2014), Italian operatic soprano
- John Barbato (1934–2025), American mobster
- Johnny Barbato (born 1992), American baseball pitcher
- Joseph Barbato (born 1994), French footballer
- Nicola Barbato (1856–1923), Italian medical doctor, socialist and politician
- Paola Barbato (born 1971), Italian writer
- Paul Barbato (born 1987), American YouTuber and host of Geography Now!
- Silvio Barbato (1959–2009), Italian-Brazilian opera conductor and composer
