= Joseph Barbato =

French footballer (born 1994)

Personal information
- Full name: Joseph Barbato
- Date of birth: 11 August 1994 (age 32)
- Place of birth: Melun, France
- Height: 1.79 m (5 ft 10 in)
- Position: Forward

Team information
- Current team: Furiani

Youth career
- Bastia

Senior career*
Years	Team	Apps	(Gls)
2011–2015	Bastia	10	(0)
2012–2014	Bastia II	29	(9)
2014–2015	→ Colomiers (loan)	12	(0)
2015–2016	Borgo	20	(11)
2016–2017	Furiani	18	(2)
2017	Bastia-Borgo	1	(0)
2018	ÉF Bastia	20	(7)
2019–	Furiani	12	(1)
Medal record
Football
SC Bastia
Winner	Ligue 2	2012
- * Club domestic league appearances and goals as of 1 July 2019

Joseph Barbato (born 11 August 1994) is a French professional footballer who plays as a forward for Furiani.

== Career ==
In January 2019, he returned to Furiani.

== Club statistics ==
As of 24 August 2014.

Team	Season	League (Note: Includes Ligue 1, Ligue 2 and Championnat National.)		Cup (Note: Includes Coupe de France, Coupe de la Ligue and Trophée des champions.)		Europe (Note: Includes UEFA Champions League, UEFA Cup and UEFA Supercup)		Total	
Team	Season	Apps	Goals	Apps	Goals	Apps	Goals	Apps	Goals
Bastia	L2 2011–12	1	0	0	0	—		1	0
Bastia	L1 2012–13	5	0	2	0	—		7	0
Bastia	L1 2013–14	4	0	1	0	—		5	0
Bastia	Total	10	0	3	0	0	0	13	0
Career total		10	0	3	0	0	0	13	0
