= Anthony Salis =

French footballer (born 1988)

Personal information
- Date of birth: 13 October 1988 (age 38)
- Place of birth: Bastia, France
- Height: 1.75 m (5 ft 9 in)
- Position: Midfielder

Team information
- Current team: SVARR

Youth career
- 2005–2008: Ajaccio

Senior career*
Years	Team	Apps	(Gls)
2006–2008	Ajaccio	1	(0)
2008–2009	Cognac		
2009–2010	Gazélec Ajaccio	24	(0)
2010–2014	CA Bastia	90	(0)
2014–2015	Poiré-sur-Vie	17	(2)
2015–2016	FB Île-Rousse	12	(4)
2016–2018	Furiani	41	(0)
2018–2021	Bastia	40	(0)
2021-2023	FC Balagne	22	(2)
2023-2024	SC Bastia	0	(0)
2024-	SVARR	1	(0)
- * Club domestic league appearances and goals as of 14:33, 13 August 2021 (UTC)

Anthony Salis (born 13 October 1988) is a French professional footballer who plays as a midfielder for National 3 club FC Balagne.

He played on the professional level in Ligue 2 for AC Ajaccio and SC Bastia. Salis led Vendée Poiré-sur-Vie Football to the 1/16-final of the 2014–15 Coupe de France, a match he missed through suspension as AJ Auxerre won on penalties.

== Career ==
After two years with AS Furiani-Agliani, he signed a one-year contract with SC Bastia in 2018.
