= Florent Marty =

French footballer (born 1984)

Personal information
- Full name: Florent Marty
- Date of birth: 15 March 1984 (age 42)
- Place of birth: Paris, France
- Height: 1.71 m (5 ft 7 in)
- Position: Midfielder

Team information
- Current team: Furiani-Agliani

Senior career*
| Years | Team | Apps | (Gls) |
| 2002–2004 | Lyon B | 28 | (9) |
| 2004–2009 | Gueugnon | 112 | (10) |
| 2009 | Lyon-Duchère | 7 | (1) |
| 2009–2010 | Amiens | 27 | (2) |
| 2010–2011 | AS Vitré | 22 | (3) |
| 2011–2015 | CA Bastia | 96 | (3) |
| 2015–2016 | Borgo FC | 20 | (1) |
| 2016–2018 | Louhans-Cuiseaux | 44 | (3) |
| 2018– | Furiani-Agliani | | |
- * Club domestic league appearances and goals as of 21:39, 21 March 2019 (UTC)

Florent Marty (born 15 March 1984) is a footballer who plays as a midfielder for French Championnat National club AS Furiani-Agliani.

He signed for Championnat National side Amiens SC in the summer of 2009 from AS Lyon Duchère.

Marty previously played for FC Gueugnon in Ligue 2. (Note: Florent Marty – French league stats at LFP – also available in French (archived))
