= Johann Truchet =

French footballer (born 1983)

Personal information
- Date of birth: 16 August 1983 (age 43)
- Place of birth: Villefranche-sur-Saône, France
- Height: 1.79 m (5 ft 10 in)
- Position: Defender

Senior career*
Years	Team	Apps	(Gls)
2002–2006	Lyon B	79	(3)
2006	→ Reims (loan)	15	(0)
2006–2007	Guingamp	18	(0)
2007–2010	Reims	29	(0)
2010–2015	CA Bastia	91	(2)
2015–2017	Borgo FC	41	(1)
2017	Bastia-Borgo	5	(0)
2018–?	Furiani-Agliani		
- * Club domestic league appearances and goals

Johann Truchet (born 16 August 1983) is a French former professional footballer who played as a defender.

Truchet signed for then Ligue 2 side Reims in the summer of 2007 from Guingamp.

== Honours ==
- Trophée des Champions: 2004
