= Abdoulaye Keita (footballer, born 1994) =

Malian footballer

Personal information
- Full name: Abdoulaye Keita
- Date of birth: 5 January 1994 (age 32)
- Place of birth: Bamako, Mali
- Height: 1.75 m (5 ft 9 in)
- Position: Defensive midfielder

Team information
- Current team: FC Coffrane
- Number: 33

Youth career
- –2012: Bastia

Senior career*
Years	Team	Apps	(Gls)
2012–2017	Bastia B	52	(4)
2012–2017	Bastia	40	(0)
2017–2018	Le Havre B	3	(0)
2017–2018	Le Havre	2	(0)
2018	Ajaccio	9	(0)
2018	Ajaccio B	1	(0)
2018–2019	Panionios	14	(0)
2019–2021	Olympiacos	0	(0)
2019–2021	→ Ajaccio (loan)	4	(0)
2020–2021	→ Ajaccio B (loan)	1	(0)
2021–2022	Jura Dolois	4	(0)
2022	Prix-lès-Mézières	2	(0)
2022–2025	AAS Sarcelles		
2025	Chaux-de-Fonds	11	(2)
2025–	FC Coffrane	5	(0)
- * Club domestic league appearances and goals as of 23:29, 19 January 2022 (UTC)

Abdoulaye Keita (born 5 January 1994) is a Malian professional footballer who plays as a defensive midfielder.

== Career ==
On 26 June 2018, Panionios announced Keita's signing for the team. On 17 January 2022, he joined Prix-lès-Mézières.
