= Massiré Kanté =

French footballer (born 1989)

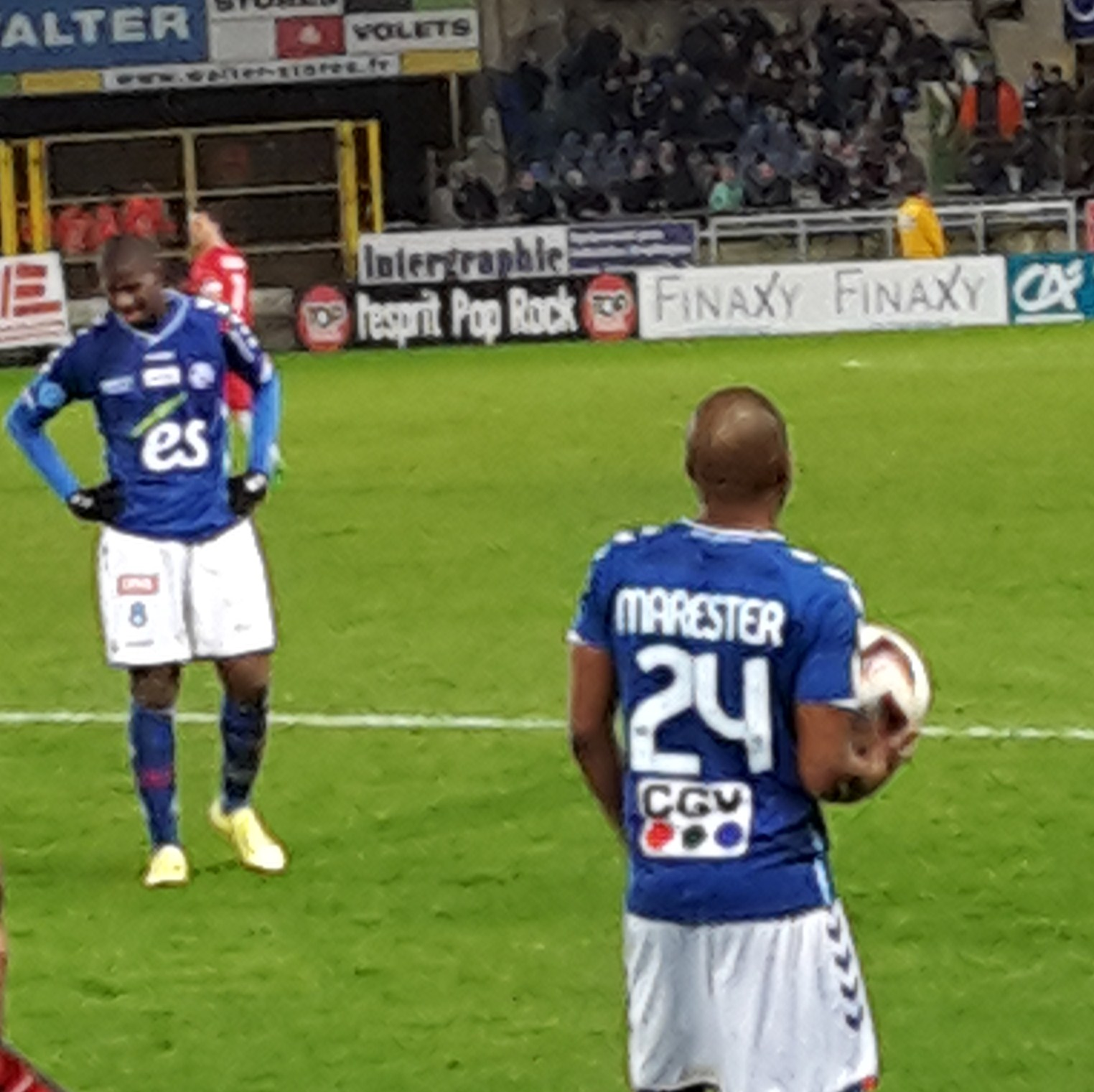
- Kanté (left) with Strasbourg in 2016

Personal information
- Full name: Massiré Kanté
- Date of birth: 31 March 1989 (age 37)
- Place of birth: Courbevoie, France
- Height: 1.96 m (6 ft 5 in)
- Position: Midfielder

Team information
- Current team: Mulhouse

Youth career
- 2007–2011: Le Mans

Senior career*
Years	Team	Apps	(Gls)
2010–2013	Le Mans B	44	(6)
2011–2013	Le Mans	29	(4)
2013–2014	Bastia	2	(0)
2014–2015	Red Star	23	(3)
2015–2017	Strasbourg	21	(1)
2016–2017	→ Sedan (loan)	12	(2)
2017–2018	Martigues	21	(4)
2018–2019	Fleury	12	(3)
2019–2020	Toulon	1	(0)
2020	Bastia	0	(0)
2020–2021	Colomiers	0	(0)
2021–	Mulhouse	2	(0)
- * Club domestic league appearances and goals as of 20:09, 29 April 2022 (UTC)

Massiré Kanté (born 31 March 1989) is a French professional footballer who plays as a midfielder for Championnat National 1 club Mulhouse.

== Career ==
Kanté made his Ligue 2 debut during the 2011–12 season for Le Mans, where he played 14 times in total, scoring one goal.

He holds French and Senegalese nationalities.
