= Olivier Vannucci =

French footballer (born 1991)

Personal information
- Date of birth: 24 May 1991 (age 35)
- Place of birth: Ajaccio, France
- Position: Central defender

Senior career*
Years	Team	Apps	(Gls)
2010–2013	SC Bastia	2	(0)
2012–2013	SC Bastia II	14	(0)
2013–2015	Gazélec Ajaccio	2	(0)
2015–2016	Borgo FC		
2016	GC Lucciana		
- * Club domestic league appearances and goals

Olivier Vannucci (born 24 May 1991) is a French former professional footballer who played as a centre-back.

== Career statistics ==
=== Club ===
Appearances and goals by club, season and competition
Club	Season	League (Note: Includes Ligue 1, Ligue 2 and Championnat National.)			Cup (Note: Includes Coupe de France, Coupe de la Ligue and Trophée des champions.)		Europe (Note: Includes UEFA Champions League, UEFA Cup and UEFA Supercup)		Total	
Club	Season	Division	Apps	Goals	Apps	Goals	Apps	Goals	Apps	Goals
Bastia	2009–10	Ligue 2	1	0	0	0	—		1	0
Bastia	2010–11	Championnat National	1	0	0	0	—		1	0
Bastia	2011–12	Ligue 2	0	0	0	0	—		0	0
Bastia	2012–13	Ligue 1	0	0	0	0	—		0	0
Bastia	Total		2	0	0	0	0	0	2	0
Gazélec Ajaccio	2013–14	Championnat National	0	0	0	0	—		0	0
Career total			2	0	0	0	0	0	2	0
