= Nabil Aankour =

Moroccan footballer

Personal information
- Full name: Nabil Aankour
- Date of birth: 9 August 1993 (age 33)
- Place of birth: Temsamane, Morocco
- Height: 1.72 m (5 ft 8 in)
- Position: Midfielder

Youth career
- 2001–2008: Étoile Filante Bastiaise
- 2008–2011: Bastia

Senior career*
Years	Team	Apps	(Gls)
2011–2014	Bastia B	41	(3)
2014–2018	Korona Kielce	88	(5)
2018–2020	Arka Gdynia	28	(2)
2020–2021	MC Oujda	12	(1)
- * Club domestic league appearances and goals as of 8 August 2024

Nabil Aankour (born 9 August 1993) is a Moroccan professional footballer who plays as a midfielder.
