= Julien Sablé =

French football manager (born 1980)

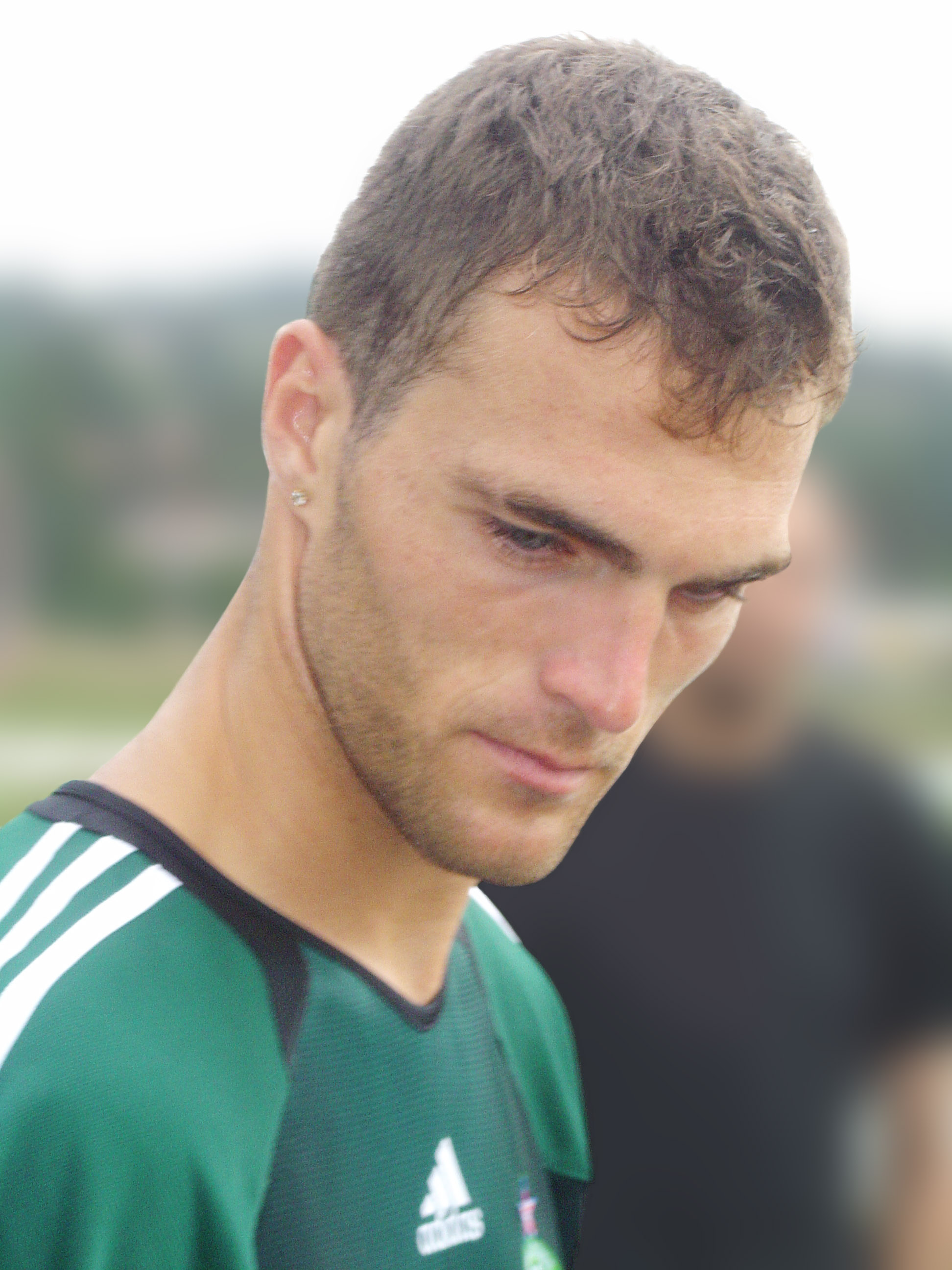
- Sablé with Saint-Étienne in 2006

Personal information
- Date of birth: 11 September 1980 (age 46)
- Place of birth: Marseille, France
- Height: 1.80 m (5 ft 11 in)
- Position: Midfielder

Team information
- Current team: Nice (Manager)

Senior career*
Years	Team	Apps	(Gls)
1997–2007	Saint-Étienne	303	(9)
2007–2009	Lens	28	(0)
2009–2012	Nice	90	(0)
2012–2014	Bastia	44	(0)
Total		465	(9)

International career
1995–1996	France U16	6	(0)
1996–1997	France U17	4	(0)
2002	France U21	3	(0)

Managerial career
- 2015–2016: Saint-Étienne B
- 2016–2017: Saint-Étienne U19
- 2017: Saint-Étienne (interim)
- 2017–2021: Saint-Étienne (assistant)
- 2021: Saint-Étienne (interim)
- 2021–2022: Saint-Étienne (assistant)
- 2022–2023: Nice B
- 2023: Nice (assistant)
Medal record
Men's football
Representing France
UEFA European Under-21 Championship
Runner-up	2002 Switzerland
- * Club domestic league appearances and goals

Julien Sablé (born 11 September 1980) is a French professional football manager. In his playing days as a midfielder, he represented France at youth international level.

== Club career ==
Sablé began his career at Saint-Étienne, where he made his first team debut in the 1997–98 season. He became an integral member of the club the following season, when they earned promotion to Ligue 1. Sablé later earned the captain's armband at Saint-Étienne. In 2007, he signed a contract with Lens. In January 2009, he joined Nice, where he would eventually become club captain. He joined Bastia in October 2012, before retiring at the end of the following season, the same day as Mickaël Landreau.

== Managerial career ==
In December 2017, Sablé, who had been working as Saint-Étienne's under-19 coach, stepped in as the club's interim head coach following the departure of Óscar García. He managed six games, with a record of two draws and four losses, before being replaced by Jean-Louis Gasset. Sablé took up the post of assistant manager at the club after Gasset's arrival, and remained as an assistant throughout the spells of Gasset, Ghislain Printant, and Claude Puel as manager. In December 2021, Sablé once again became Saint-Étienne's interim manager, this time following the dismissal of Puel. After Pascal Dupraz was appointed, Sablé returned to his post of assistant. He left Saint-Étienne at the end of the 2022–23 season, with the club suffering relegation to Ligue 2.

On 12 December 2022, Sablé became the manager of Championnat National 3 side Nice B. After Lucien Favre was sacked, he was promoted to assistant manager for Nice's first team, under the direction of Didier Digard, formerly the assistant coach. Since Digard initially did not have his UEFA Pro License, UEFA rules prevented him from carrying out the usual pre-match press conference duties held by the manager in UEFA competitions. Sablé, as assistant, completed the press conference instead of Digard ahead of a UEFA Europa Conference League match against Sheriff Tiraspol, and was listed as the manager on the match sheet to oblige by the rules.

== Managerial statistics ==
As of 17 December 2017

Team	From	To	Record							
Team	From	To	G	W	D	L	GF	GA	GD	Win %
Saint-Étienne	15 November 2017	20 December 2017	6	0	2	4	4	16	−12	0.00
Total			6	0	2	4	4	16	−12	0.00

== Honours ==
=== Player ===
Saint-Étienne

- Ligue 2: 1999–2000, 2003–04

Lens

- Ligue 2: 2008–09
- Coupe de la Ligue runner-up: 2007–08

France U21

- UEFA European Under-21 Championship runner-up: 2002

Individual

- UNFP Ligue 2 Team of the Year: 2003–04
