= Christophe Vincent =

French footballer (born 1992)

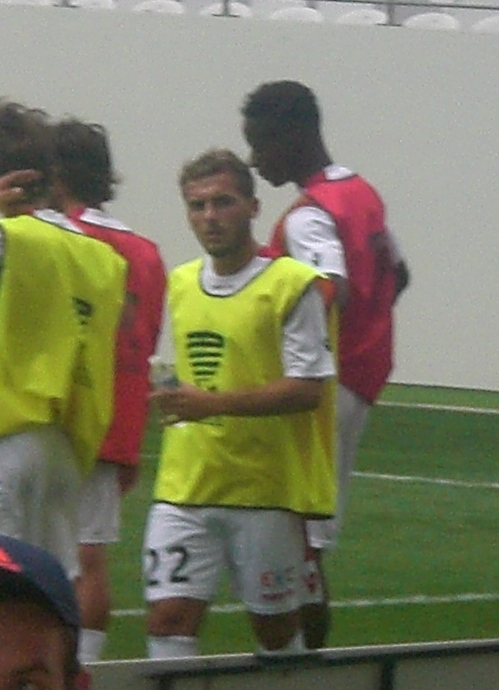
- Vincent training with Ajaccio in 2015

Personal information
- Date of birth: 8 November 1992 (age 34)
- Place of birth: Bastia, France
- Height: 1.78 m (5 ft 10 in)
- Position: Midfielder

Team information
- Current team: Furiani-Agliani

Youth career
- GFC Bastia Lucciana
- ÉF Bastia

Senior career*
Years	Team	Apps	(Gls)
2011–2015	Bastia	8	(0)
2012–2015	Bastia II	32	(0)
2013–2014	→ CA Bastia (loan)	27	(1)
2015–2017	Ajaccio	41	(0)
2015–2017	Ajaccio II	2	(0)
2017–2018	Cercle Brugge	18	(1)
2018–2026	Bastia	214	(21)
2026–	Furiani-Agliani	0	(0)
- * Club domestic league appearances and goals as of 12 May 2026

Christophe Vincent (born 8 November 1992) is a French professional footballer who plays as a midfielder for Championnat National 1 club Furiani-Agliani.

== Career ==
Vincent played youth football for GFC Bastia Lucciana and ÉF Bastia, before signing for SC Bastia where he played for two seasons with the B team before graduating to the senior squad. He made his first team debut for the club on 3 October 2011, as a second-half substitute in a 3–1 Ligue 2 away win against US Boulogne. On 5 June 2012, it was announced Vincent had signed a three-year professional contract with SC Bastia, following their promotion to Ligue 1. In summer 2013 he was loaned to Ligue 2 neighbours CA Bastia for the season.

On 18 June 2015, AC Ajaccio announced the signing of Vincent from Corsican rivals SC Bastia.

In January 2017, Vincent joined Belgian club Cercle Brugge on a year-and-a-half contract. In August 2018, at the end of the contract, he left the club, and in October of the same year re-signed for his first club SC Bastia.

== Career statistics ==
As of 10 June 2021

Appearances and goals by club, season and competition
Team	Season	League			Cup (Note: Includes Coupe de France, Coupe de la Ligue and Belgian Cup.)		Europe (Note: Includes UEFA Champions League, UEFA Cup and UEFA Supercup.)		Total	
Team	Season	Division	Apps	Goals	Apps	Goals	Apps	Goals	Apps	Goals
Bastia	2011–12	Ligue 2	5	0	4	0	—		9	0
Bastia	2012–13	Ligue 1	2	0	1	0	—		3	0
Bastia	2014–15	Ligue 1	1	0	4	0	—		5	0
Bastia	Total		8	0	9	0	0	0	17	0
CA Bastia (loan)	2013–14	Ligue 2	27	1	4	0	—		31	1
Ajaccio	2015–16	Ligue 2	24	0	2	0	—		26	0
Ajaccio	2016–17	Ligue 2	17	0	3	0	—		20	0
Ajaccio	Total		41	0	5	0	—		46	0
Cercle Brugge	2016–17	First Division B	9	0	—		—		9	0
Cercle Brugge	2017–18	First Division B	9	1	2	1	—		11	2
Cercle Brugge	Total		18	1	2	1	—		20	2
Bastia	2018–19	National 3	14	5	4	0	—		18	5
Bastia	2019–20	National 2	17	1	0	0	—		17	1
Bastia	2020–21	National	29	3	0	0	—		29	3
Bastia	Total		60	9	4	0	—		64	9
Career total			154	11	24	1	0	0	178	12
