= Jonathan Roufosse =

French footballer (born 1985)

Personal information
- Full name: Jonathan Roufosse
- Date of birth: 10 April 1985 (age 41)
- Place of birth: Vitry-sur-Seine, France
- Height: 1.81 m (5 ft 11 in)
- Position: Attacking midfielder

Team information
- Current team: USP Grand Avignon

Senior career*
Years	Team	Apps	(Gls)
2001–2006	Le Havre AC	0	(0)
2006–2009	CS Louhans-Cuiseaux		
2009–2011	Evian Thonon Gaillard	43	(10)
2011–2012	AS Cannes	4	(0)
2012–2013	AC Arles-Avignon	12	(1)
2013	Paris FC	12	(1)
2014–	USP Grand Avignon	21	(1)
- * Club domestic league appearances and goals as of 1 November 2012

Jonathan Roufosse (born 10 April 1985) is a French footballer who plays as an attacking midfielder for Paris FC.
