= Florent André =

French footballer (born 1991)

Personal information
- Full name: Florent Pierre André
- Date of birth: 6 June 1991 (age 35)
- Place of birth: Marseille, France
- Height: 1.75 m (5 ft 9 in)
- Position: Midfielder

Senior career*
Years	Team	Apps	(Gls)
–2011	Montpellier II		
2011–2012	Bastia II	1	(1)
2012–2014	Bastia	2	(0)
2012–2013	→ Fréjus Saint-Raphaël (loan)	6	(0)
2012–2013	→ Fréjus Saint-Raphaël II (loan)	9	(0)
2014	→ Consolat Marseille (loan)	3	(0)
2014–2015	Nîmes Olympique II	16	(2)
2015	Toulon-Le Las	2	(0)
2016–2017	Târgu Mureș	6	(0)
- * Club domestic league appearances and goals as of 27 June 2017

Florent André (born 6 June 1991) is a French footballer who plays as a midfielder.
