= Sylvain Marchal =

French former professional footballer (born 1980)

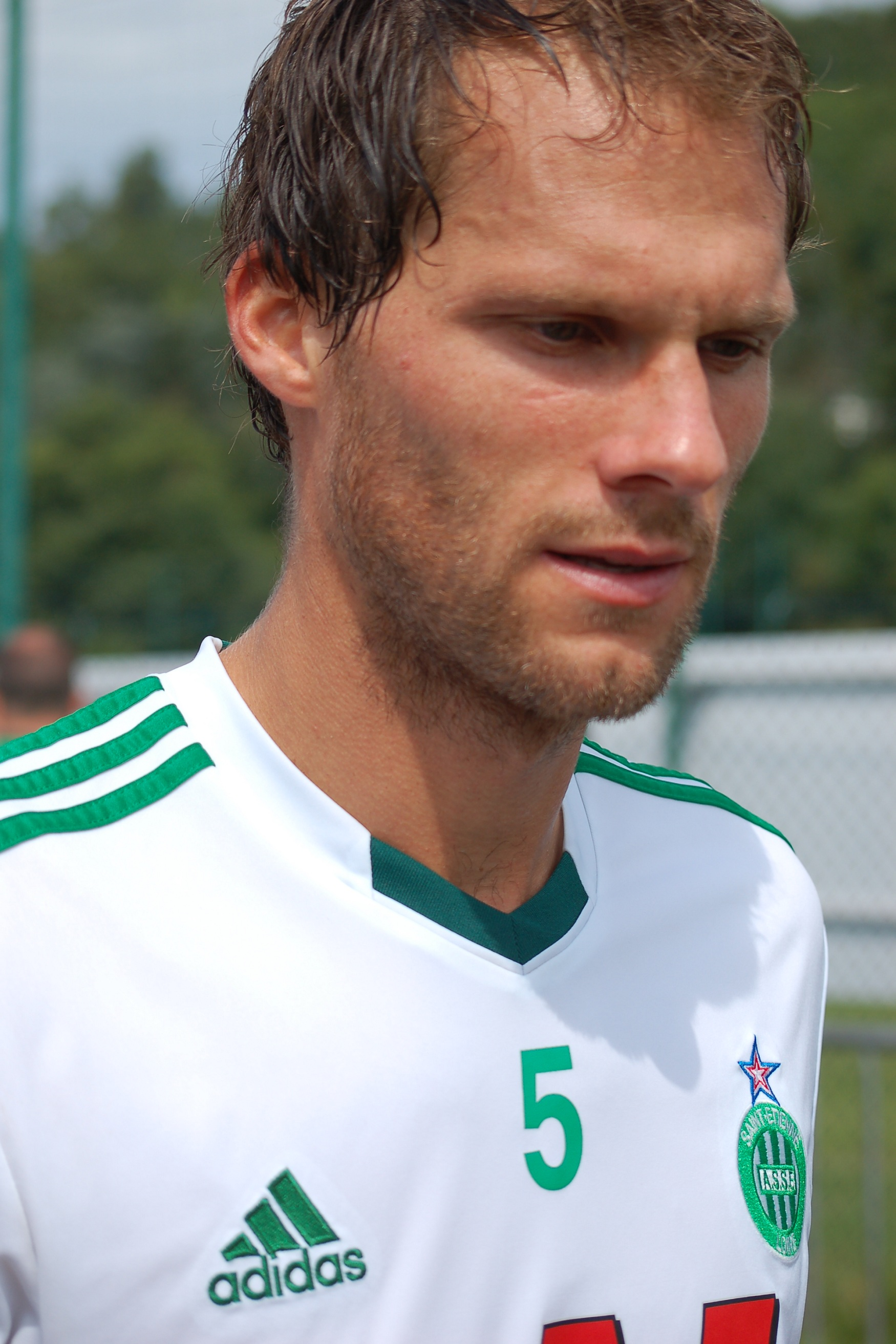
- Marchal in 2011

Personal information
- Date of birth: 10 February 1980 (age 46)
- Place of birth: Langres, France
- Height: 1.84 m (6 ft 0 in)
- Position: Defender

Senior career*
Years	Team	Apps	(Gls)
1996–2005	Metz	90	(2)
2004–2005	→ Châteauroux (loan)	27	(0)
2005–2010	Lorient	146	(6)
2010–2012	Saint-Étienne	48	(2)
2011	Saint-Étienne B	1	(0)
2012–2013	Bastia	30	(1)
2013–2015	Metz	42	(0)
2013	Metz B	1	(0)
Total		385	(11)
- * Club domestic league appearances and goals

Sylvain Marchal (born 10 February 1980) is a French former professional footballer who played as a defender.

== Career ==
Marchal began his career at FC Metz, making his Ligue 1 debut on 10 March 1999 in the 0–0 draw at AS Monaco. It was in the latter half of the 2001–02 season that he established himself as a regular in the Metz lineup, but fell out of favour by August 2004, when he was loaned out to Ligue 2 club LB Châteauroux.

A year later he returned to Metz to start in the first two matches of the 2005–06 season, but then transferred to FC Lorient in Ligue 2. Lorient won promotion with him in the team, and he was a regular for them in the opening months of 2006–07 in Ligue 1.

On 17 June 2010, Marchal joined Saint-Étienne until 30 June 2013.

On 27 July 2012, he signed a two-year contract with the Corsican club Bastia.

Only a season later, he left the Ligue 1 side by mutual consent to join his first club Metz, recently promoted in the Ligue 2. In February 2016, Metz announced the end of Marchal's career.
