= Landry Bonnefoi =

French footballer (born 1983)

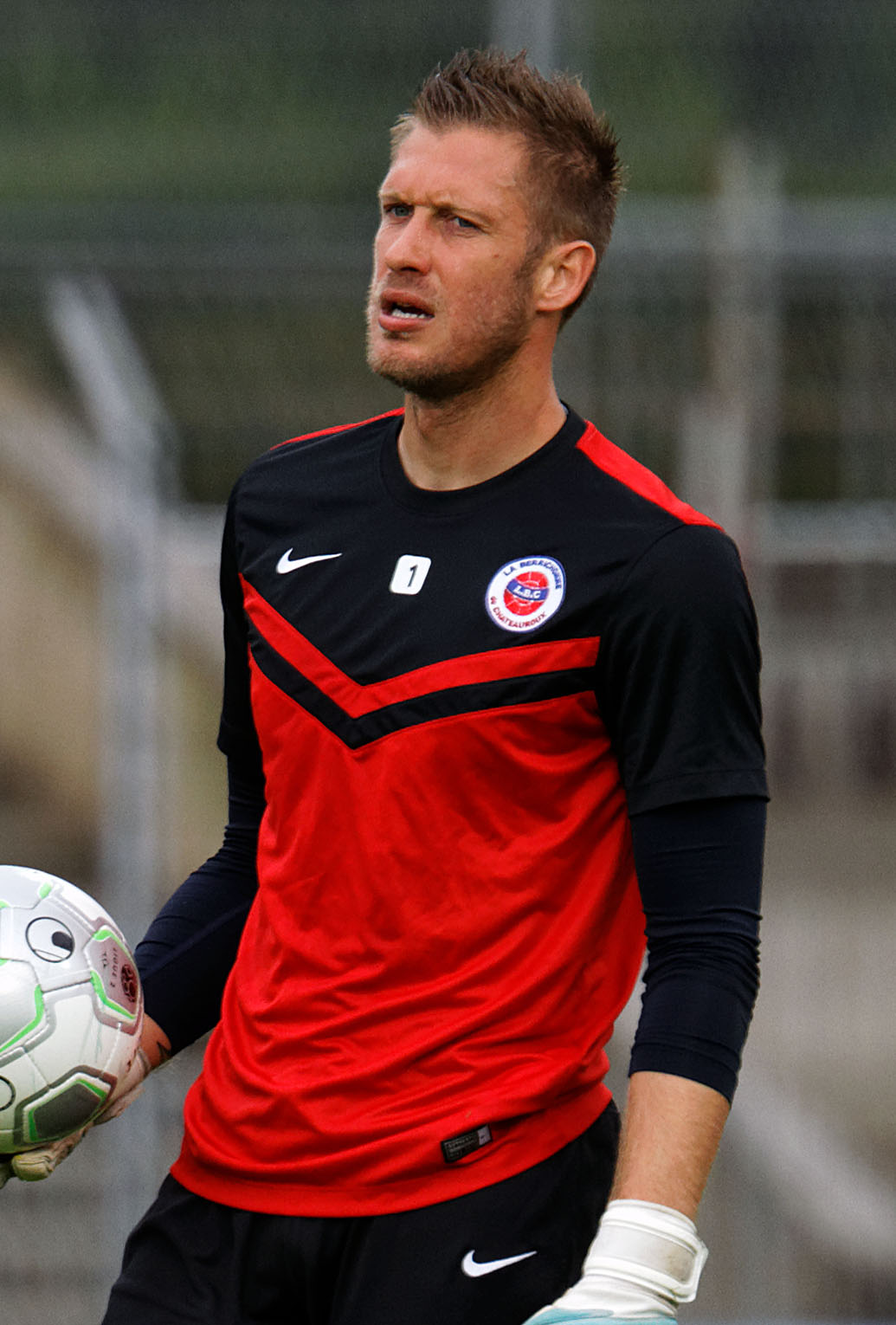
- Bonnefoi with Châteauroux in 2014

Personal information
- Date of birth: 20 September 1983 (age 43)
- Place of birth: Villeparisis, Seine-et-Marne, France
- Height: 1.84 m (6 ft 0 in)
- Position: Goalkeeper

Youth career
- 1992–1993: ES Saint-Pathus Oissery
- 1993–1997: ES Saint-Soupplets
- 1997–2000: Cannes

Senior career*
| Years | Team | Apps | (Gls) |
| 2000–2001 | Cannes | 0 | (0) |
| 2001–2007 | Juventus | 0 | (0) |
| 2003–2004 | → Messina (loan) | 1 | (0) |
| 2006–2007 | → Metz (loan) | 1 | (0) |
| 2007–2009 | Dijon | 24 | (0) |
| 2009–2012 | Amiens | 106 | (0) |
| 2012–2013 | Bastia | 8 | (0) |
| 2013–2016 | Châteauroux | 72 | (0) |
| 2016–2017 | Strasbourg | 2 | (0) |
| 2017–2018 | Strasbourg | 4 | (0) |
| 2018–2019 | Dudelange | 0 | (0) |

International career
| 2004 | France U21 | 1 | (0) |
- * Club domestic league appearances and goals

Landry Bonnefoi (born 20 September 1983) is a retired French professional footballer who played as a goalkeeper. He is currently contracted as the goalkeeping coach of Luxembourgish team Union Titus Petange.

== Career ==
Bonnefoi was born in Villeparisis, Seine-et-Marne. He was signed by Italian club Juventus from AS Cannes in 2001. Bonnefoi then spent two seasons initially playing for the Juventus youth team, although he was later promoted to the first team as the club's reserve goalkeeper behind Gianluigi Buffon and Antonio Chimenti, but did not make a single official appearance for the club. During the 2003–04 season, he was loaned to Messina, but only played one game for the Sicilian side. He was brought back to the club in 2004.

In 2006, wanting more appearances and feeling home sick, he was loaned to Ligue 2 team Metz, the team having an option to buy him permanently at the end of the season. In 2007, he moved to Dijon; he later played for Amiens between 2009 and 2012.

Following his club's relegation to the third division, Bonnefoi, on 31 July 2012 signed for the Corsican club SC Bastia.

Having been released by Strasbourg at the end of the 2016–17 season, he was re-signed on a one-year contract in July 2017 for the 2017-18 season.

For the season 2018–19 Bonnefoi signed for F91 Dudelange in Luxembourg, and appeared in UEFA Europa League.

At the end of 2018-19 season, Bonnefoi retired from professional football.

Since March 2020, he has worked as goalkeeping coach of Luxembourgish team Union Titus Petange.
