= Dominique Agostini =

French footballer (born 1989)

Personal information
- Date of birth: 28 September 1989 (age 37)
- Place of birth: Bastia, France
- Height: 1.82 m (6 ft 0 in)
- Position: Goalkeeper

Senior career*
Years	Team	Apps	(Gls)
2008–2013	Bastia	15	(0)
2013–2015	CA Bastia	1	(0)
Total		16	(0)
- * Club domestic league appearances and goals

Dominique Agostini (born 28 September 1989 in Bastia) is a French former professional footballer who played as a goalkeeper.

== Honours ==
Bastia

- Ligue 2: 2011–12
- Championnat National: 2010–11
