= Stade Armand-Cesari =

Football stadium

Stade Armand Cesari
- Stade de Furiani
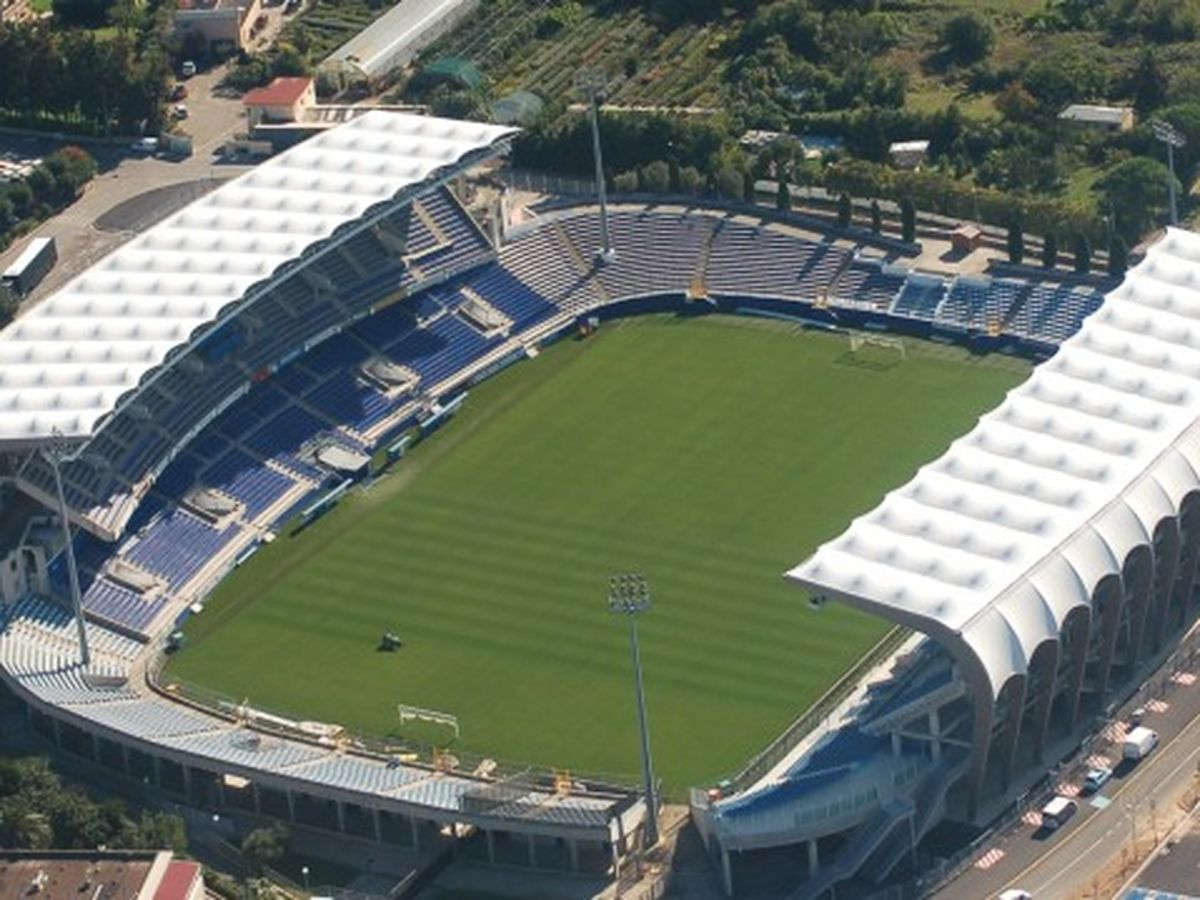
- Interactive map of Stade Armand Cesari
- Location: Furiani, France
- Coordinates: 42°39′5″N 9°26′34″E
- Owner: Communauté d'agglomération de Bastia
- Capacity: 16,048
- Surface: Grass
- Field size: 105m x 68m

Construction
- Opened: 1932
- Renovated: 1948, 1992, 1994, 1997, 2001, 2011, 2012, 2024-2025

Tenants
- Sporting Club de Bastia (1932–present); CA Bastia

Stade Armand Cesari, also known as the Stade de Furiani, is a multi-purpose stadium in Furiani, France. It is currently used mostly for football matches of SC Bastia. The stadium is able to hold 16,000 people and opened in 1932.

It was the venue for the first leg of the 1978 UEFA Cup Final, which saw a 0–0 tie between SC Bastia and the Dutch-side PSV Eindhoven. Eventually, PSV won the Final with a 3–0 victory on their home ground Philips Stadion.

The record attendance at the stadium was set on 1 September 2012, when 15,505 people saw Bastia lose against Saint-Étienne (3–0) in a league match. This broke the record set on 26 April 1978, when 15,000 people saw Bastia draw 0–0 against PSV Eindhoven in the first leg of the 1978 UEFA Cup Final.

== Furiani disaster ==
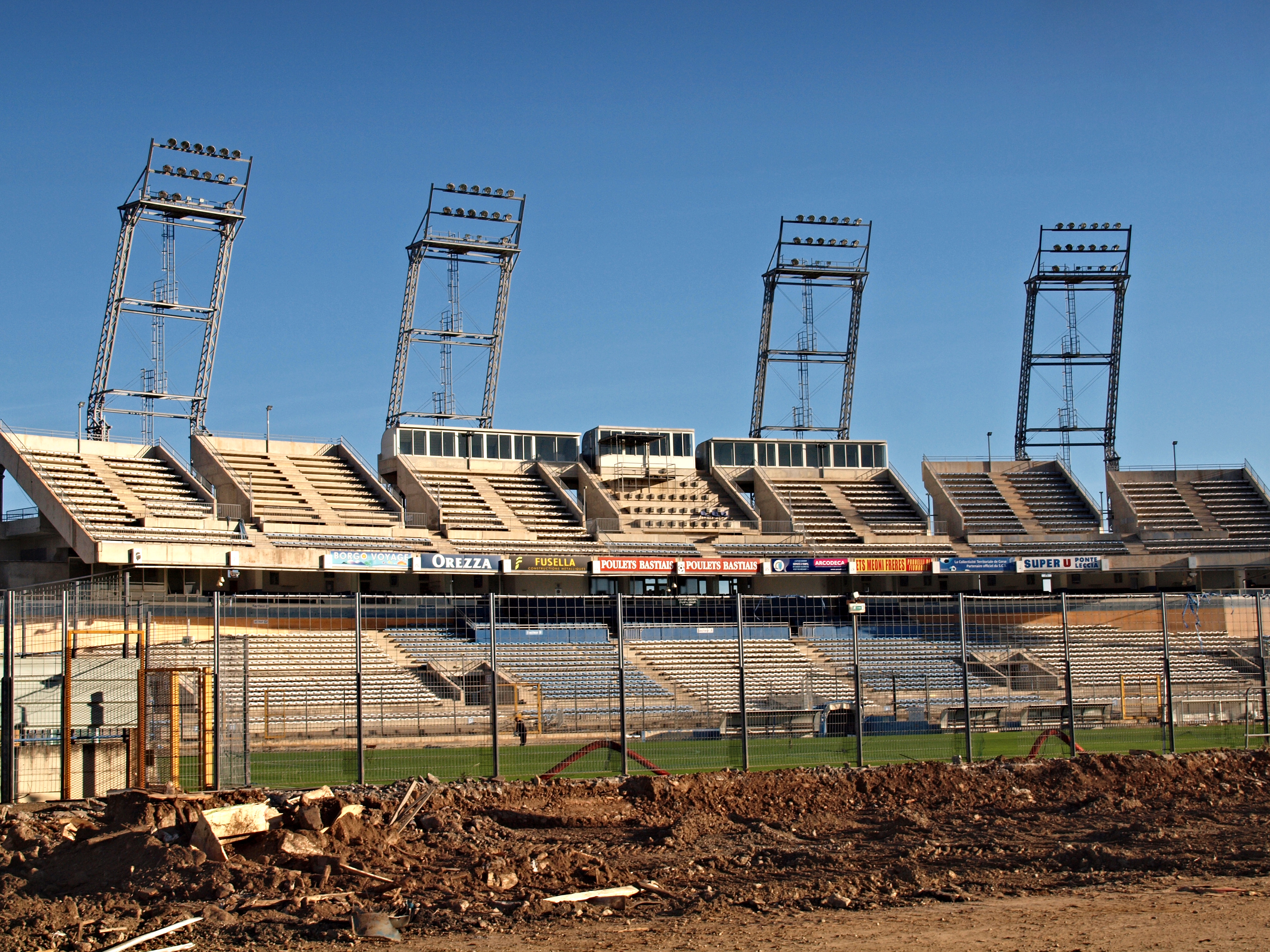
Stade de Furiani in 2009.

The stadium is mostly known outside Corsica for the Furiani disaster, which occurred on 5 May 1992 when one of the four terraces collapsed, causing the death of 18 people and injuring more than 2,300 others.

=== Background ===
When they reached the semi-final of the 1991–92 Coupe de France, the draw gave Bastia a tie against Olympique de Marseille, the Division 1 leader at the time. In order to accommodate more fans, the club board decided to create a temporary terrace instead of the old Tribune Claude Papi which could only take 750 fans. The new capacity of the terrace was 10,000.

=== Matchday ===
An hour before the start of the match, problems were already noticeable, such as the instability of the structure. At 8:20 p.m., the whole structure collapsed, with supporters and journalists in the wreckage. Every medical option on the island was exhausted. The victims were eventually evacuated to the mainland, including Marseille. Poretta Airport was quoted as resembling more of a hospital than an airport that night.

=== Aftermath ===
On 8 May, an official investigation began in order to find who was responsible. After the disaster, the FFF decided — after some hesitation — to cancel the remaining matches in the Cup. On the 12th, the investigators came to the conclusion that there had been a number of rules broken concerning the terrace. All these findings led to the investigation's conclusion "Le soir du 5 mai, il n'y a pas eu de fatalité," which translates as "On the evening of May 5, there was no fatality." Ultimately, at the trial a year later, the main protagonists were proven guilty but were only given prison sentences of less than two years.

== Recent history ==
Following the disaster, the stadium waited a long time to be rebuilt. The Tribune Nord was rebuilt in 1997, before Bastia could play again in the 1997–98 UEFA Cup.

For the 100th anniversary of the club, in 2005, the four terraces were renamed:

- North terrace: Tribune Claude Papi
- East terrace: Tribune Jojo Petrignani
- South terrace: Tribune Victor Lorenzi
- West terrace: Tribune Pierre Cahuzac

== See also ==
- List of football stadiums in France
- Lists of stadiums
