= SC Bastia Reserves and Academy =

SC Bastia
- Ground: Stade Erbajolo, Bastia
- Capacity: 2,000
- Manager: Benoît Tavenot and Frédéric Née (CFA 2); Ghislain Printant (U-19); Olivier Sbaiz (U-17)
- League: CFA 2 Championnat National U-19; Championnat National U-17
- 2011–12: CFA 2: Group D, 4th U-19: Group D, 8th U-17: Group D, 11th
- Website: http://www.sc-bastia.net
Home colours	Away colours	Third colours

The SC Bastia Reserves and Academy are the reserve team and academy of French football club Bastia. The Plaine de l’Igesa serves as the home facility for the club's Reserves and Academy sides, which play their home matches at the Stade Erbajolo and Stade Armand Cesari. It is located in the commune of Haute-Corse, located in the western suburbs of Bastia. Notable graduates of the academy include Alex Song, Michael Essien, Nicolas Penneteau, Yannick Cahuzac, Wahbi Khazri, Claude Papi and Charles Orlanducci. Ghislain Printant was the first director of the training centre. Benoît Tavenot and former Bastia and French international player Frédéric Née is the current director.

== Academy ==
The formation of a football player includes various periods adapted to the characteristics of young footballers. Sporting players are divided into several categories.

The football school (5-12) includes a hundred young. Then there is the preformation (12–14 years), comprising some thirty young people, as regards training for its players 14 to 18 years. Finally, the last phase before the maturity of a player is the post-training, which includes twenty young can evolve or pro CFA 2.

Bastia training policy is entering a new phase six years ago. Opened in the summer of 2002, the training center Marius Mariotti is located just next to the Stade Armand Cesari. Fully equipped to meet the needs of young athletes and football institutions, it is classified as category 2A, the same level as many of the elite formations.

=== Infrastructure ===
The site is currently pursuing Borgo, the Training Center has four golf lawns, a large playground and a gym located at the stadium. The club also has other facilities in the region Bastia.

=== Boarding ===
Accommodation has a capacity of 40 beds in rooms with 1 to 3 beds. A supervisor is assigned to the boarding night. Meals are made by specialist company and are served on site and served in a dining hall. More than 10,000 meals are produced per year, developed by a dietician based on criteria dietary and sports.

For leisure, residents have access to a games room (table football, wi-fi, video games, etc. .) and a TV room. In addition, the center has its own lingerie that makes equipment maintenance or kept personal and sports players twice a week. Has two stewards are available for internal trainings and lead to different schools of the city.

=== The medical ===
Doctor ensures constantly in daily medical practice located in the center while a therapist provides a continuously twice daily in a treatment room annex to medical practice.

== Board and staff ==
As of 27 August 2012

Academy Director	Ghislain Printant
Administrative Coordinator	Nadine Roze
School Director	Peter Molinelli
Assistant	Guy Bozano
CFA 2 Manager	Benoît Tavenot and Frédéric Née
U-19 Manager	Ghislain Printant
U-17 Manager	Olivier Sbaiz
U-16 Manager	Stéphane Franceschini
Physical Trainer	Jérémie Collon
Goalkeeping Coach	Ange Filiberti
Head Doctor	Frédéric Frau
Physiotherapist	Nunzia Giudicelli, Jean-Pierre Ienco and Henry Battesti

Source: SC Bastia.net

Technical Support Preformation Director	Dume Albertini
U-15 Manager	Dume Albertini
U-14 Manager	Bruno Mariani
Goalkeeping Coach	Ange Filiberti
Technical Supervision School Football Director	Dume Albertini
U-13 and U-12 Manager	Bruno Mariani, Charles Vittini and Fabien Legrand
U-11 and U-10 Manager	David Casanova, José Pinheiro, Dume Campanini and Charles Rafalli
U-9, U-8 and U-7 Manager	David Ledenmat, Joseph Leca, Jean-Jacques Belingheri and Jérémy Brunini
Goalkeeper Coach	François Mattei
Ground (capacity and dimensions)	Stade Armand Cesari (16,000 / -)

Source: SC Bastia.net

== Honours ==
- Division 3: 1974–75
- Division 4: 1988–89
- France U15 Football League: 2001–02
