= Borgo FC =

- Full name: Borgo Football Club
- Founded: 1918
- Dissolved: 2017
- Ground: Stade Paul-Antoniotti, Borgo
- Capacity: 1,300
- Chairman: Joseph Antoine Orsini
- Manager: Christian Vanucci
- 2016–17: CFA 2 Group F, 4th
Home colours

Borgo Football Club was a French football club based in Borgo on the island of Corsica. The club was founded in 1918 and in 2017 merged with CA Bastia to form FC Bastia-Borgo, renamed FC Borgo in 2022. The club last played in the Championnat de France Amateur 2, the fifth division of French football, after achieving their most recent promotion from the Division d'Honneur in the 2014–15 season. In the 21st century the club twice won the Corsican double winning both the Division d'Honneur of the region and the Coupe de Corse, the island's regional cup competition.
