= CA Bastia =

French football club

- Full name: Cercle Athlétique Bastiais
- Nickname: Les Noirs (The Blacks)
- Founded: 1920; 106 years ago
- Dissolved: 3 July 2017
- Ground: Stade Armand Cesari
- Capacity: 16,000
- Chairman: Antoine Emmanuelli
- Coach: Stephane Rossi
- League: Championnat National
- 2016–17: 16th, Relegated
- Website: www.ca-bastia.com
| Home colours | Away colours |

Cercle Athlétique Bastiais or CA Bastia was a French football club from Bastia, Corsica. The team's highest point was playing in Ligue 2, the second tier of the French football league system, in 2013–14.

Their historic home stadium was the Stade d'Erbajolo in Bastia, although they played their Ligue 2 home games in the Stade Armand Cesari, home stadium of the city's other professional team, SC Bastia.

In 2017, after suffering relegation from the 2016–17 Championnat National (third tier), they merged with Borgo FC to form FC Bastia-Borgo.

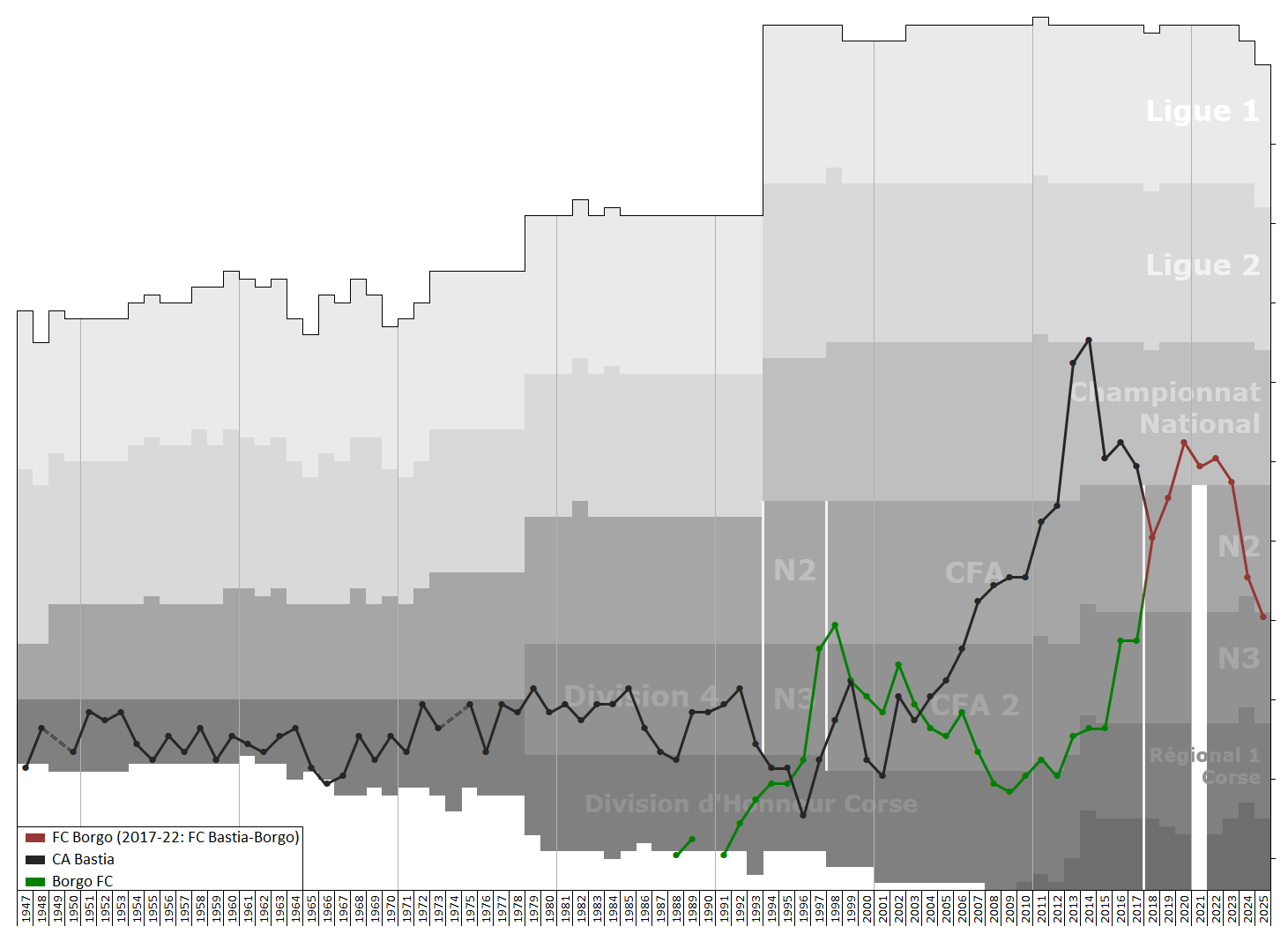
Historical league performance chart of FC Borgo and CA Bastia
