= 2011–12 SC Bastia season =

SC Bastia
2011–12 season
- Chairman: Pierre-Marie Geronimi
- Manager: Frédéric Hantz
- Stadium: Stade Armand Cesari
- Ligue 2: Champion (Promoted to Ligue 1)
- Coupe de France: 32 Round
- Coupe de la Ligue: 1st round
- Top goalscorer: League: Toifilou Maoulida (13); All: Toifilou Maoulida (17)
- Highest home attendance: 13,584 vs Châteauroux and Nantes; 23 April and 11 May 2012
- Lowest home attendance: 1,023 vs Arles; 28 October 2011
- Average home league attendance: 8,728
Home colours	Away colours	Third colours

The 2011–12 season will be SC Bastia's first season back in Ligue 2 since promotion from Championnat National in 2011. Ranked first in the league this season and promoted to Ligue 1. While the cup "last 32" round is struggling. More died in the first round of the League Cup.

Bastia, newly promoted from the National, welcomed Jérôme Rothen, Toifilou Maoulida, François Marque, Ludovic Genest and Florian Thauvin into the club. Bastia started off on a good note, falling off slightly in the autumn. From early February until the beginning of April, Bastia did not lose a single match. On 23 April 2012, in a full Stadium Armand Cesari, Bastia virtually secured their place amongst the elite by winning against Châteauroux (2–1). On 1 May 2012, Bastia became champion of Ligue 2, 44 years after its first and only league title, with their victory over Metz at Armand Cesari. On 11 May 2012, Bastia won its last game of the season at home 2–1 against Nantes thanks to goals from Jérôme Rothen and David Suarez. The club was also on a 2-year run of being undefeated at home. Bastia became part of the very exclusive club of teams undefeated at home in Europe. Several players played their last game against Nantes in the colors of Bastia, including David Suarez and Jacques-Désiré Périatambée.

Bastia won all the trophies UNFP for Ligue 2. Jérôme Rothen, best player, Macedo Novaes, best goalkeeper, and Frédéric Hantz, best coach, who placed five players in the team lineup (Macedo Novaes, Féthi Harek, Wahbi Khazri, Sadio Diallo and Jérôme Rothen).

Bastia has made this season in the seven-match preparation. Three of them won, drew two. In the remaining two were defeated. If uniforms, introduced on 27 June 2011.

== Transfers ==
=== In ===
Pos.	Name	Fee	From
Summer
MF	Jérôme Rothen	Free	Free
FW	Ludovic Genest	Undisclosed	Laval
FW	Florian Thauvin	Free	Grenoble
DF	François Marque	Undisclosed	Grenoble
FW	Toifilou Maoulida	Undisclosed	Lens
Winter
MF	Jonathan Lacourt	Undisclosed	Valenciennes

=== Out ===
Pos.	Name	Fee	To
Summer
DF	Johan Martial	€0.8m	Brest
FW	Idrissa Sylla	Undisclosed	Le Mans
MF	Nassa Guy Roland Niangbo	Undisclosed	Tubize
MF	Serisay Barthélémy	Undisclosed	Cannes
FW	Alexandre Garcia	Undisclosed	É.F. Saint-Raphaël
MF	Jean-Jacques Rocchi	–	Calvi
Winter
MF	Sony Mustivar	Free	–
MF	Jonathan Lacourt	Free	Châteauroux

== Kits ==
Kappa manufacrounded the kits for Bastia. Oscaro remained as the club's main sponsor. Was backpack sponsor; Géant, sponsor of the arm; Haute-Corse Conseil General, shorts sponsor; Corsica Ferries. In jerseys, introduced on 27 June 2011.

Home	Away	Third

== Friendly matches ==
30 June 2011 Friendly match	Bastia	2–2	Gazélec Ajaccio	Corte, France
	Suarez 18'; Khazri 49'	Report	77' Verdier; 81' Jahal	Stadium: Stade Santos Manfredi

7 July 2011 Friendly match	Calvi	0–5	Bastia	France
		Report	30' Khazri; 58' Moizini; 62' El-Azzouzi; 68' Mathieu Robail; 72' Mustivar	Stadium: Stade de Monticellu; Attendance: 300

9 July 2011 Friendly match	Brest	1–1	Bastia	France
	Poyet 18'	Report	36' Genest	Stadium: Stade de Samöens

12 July 2011 Friendly match	Evian	3–0	Bastia	France
	Bérigaud 8'; Adnane 55'; Sagbo 89'	Report		Stadium: Stade de Sallanches; Attendance: 900

15 July 2011 Friendly match	Nantes	0–4	Bastia	France
19:00		Report	26' Mary; 50' Suarez; 70' Moizini; 88' El-Azzouzi	Stadium: Stade de Sallanches

3 September 2011 Michel Moretti Cup	Ajaccio	1–2	Bastia	Ajaccio, France
	Socrier 71'; Sammaritano (yellow card) 76'; Ilan (yellow card) 83'; Poulard (yellow card) 85'	Report	44', 74' Maoulida; (yellow card) 69' Marque; (yellow card) 76' Périatambée	Stadium: Stade François Coty; Attendance: 800

4 January 2012 Friendly match	Bastia	0–2	Olympique Lyonnais	Bastia, France
16:00 UTC		Report	27', 29' L. López	Stadium: Stade Armand Cesari; Attendance: 3,500

== Squad and statistics ==
As of 23 April 2012

No.	Pos	Nat	Player	Total		Ligue 2		Coupe de France		Coupe de la Ligue	
No.	Pos	Nat	Player	Apps	Goals	Apps	Goals	Apps	Goals	Apps	Goals
1	GK	(Brazil) BRA	Macedo Novaes	41	0	37	0	3	0	1	0
2	FW	(Guinea) GUI	Sadio Diallo	33	10	30	8	2	1	1	1
3	DF	(Georgia (country)) GEO	Amiran Sanaia	10	0	8	0	2	0	0	0
4	MF	(Mauritius) MRI	Jacques-Désiré Périatambée	16	0	15	0	1	0	0	0
5	DF	(France) FRA	Pierre-François Sodini	1	0	0	0	1	0	0	0
6	MF	(France) FRA	Gaël Angoula	33	1	29	0	3	1	1	0
7	FW	(France) FRA	Ludovic Genest	26	3	23	2	2	1	1	0
8	FW	(France) FRA	Toifilou Maoulida	35	17	31	13	4	4	0	0
9	FW	(France) FRA	Yassin El-Azzouzi	19	8	17	8	1	0	1	0
10	MF	(France) FRA	Wahbi Khazri	35	9	33	9	2	0	0	0
11	DF	(France) FRA	François Marque	15	1	12	1	3	0	0	0
13	MF	(France) FRA	Salim Moizini	19	1	17	0	1	1	1	0
14	MF	(France) FRA	Mathieu Robail	13	0	11	0	1	0	1	0
17	FW	(France) FRA	Florian Thauvin	16	0	13	0	3	0	0	0
18	MF	(France) FRA	Yannick Cahuzac	32	0	30	0	1	0	1	0
19	DF	(France) FRA	Maka Mary	28	0	23	0	4	0	1	0
20	DF	(France) FRA	Matthieu Sans	27	3	24	1	2	1	1	1
21	DF	(Algeria) ALG	Féthi Harek	40	2	36	2	3	0	1	0
23	FW	(France) FRA	David Suarez	36	14	32	9	3	5	1	0
24	DF	(France) FRA	Jérémy Choplin	39	4	35	3	4	1	0	0
25	MF	(France) FRA	Jérôme Rothen	35	5	32	4	2	1	1	0
29	DF	(France) FRA	Gilles Cioni	25	0	23	0	1	0	1	0
30	GK	(France) FRA	Dominique Agostini	1	0	0	0	1	0	0	0
33	MF	(France) FRA	Christophe Vincent	8	0	5	0	3	0	0	0
33	MF	(France) FRA	Florent André	3	0	2	0	1	0	0	0
33	FW	(France) FRA	Joseph Barbato	1	0	1	0	0	0	0	0
33	FW	(France) FRA	Amadou N'Diaye	1	0	0	0	1	0	0	0
40	GK	(France) FRA	Thomas Vincensini	1	0	1	0	0	0	0	0
Players who appeared for Bastia no longer at the club:
22	MF	(France) FRA	Sony Mustivar	0	0	0	0	0	0	0	0
22	MF	(France) FRA	Jonathan Lacourt	0	0	0	0	0	0	0	0

== Current technical staff ==
As of 7 November 2011

Position	Staff
Coach	Frédéric Hantz
Assistant coaches	Réginald Ray, Benoît Tavenot
Striker coach	Frédéric Née
Goalkeeper coach	Hervé Sekli
Team doctors	Marie-Claude Filippi, François Brochet
Physiotherapists	Stéphane Meunier, Nunzia Giudicelli
Fitness coach	Didier Bouillot
Intendant	Sébastien Galletti
Logistical	Joseph "Jo" Bonavita

Last updated: 7 November 2011
Source: SC Bastia Official Website

== Competitions ==
=== Ligue 2 ===
==== League table ====
Pos	Team	Pld	W	D	L	GF	GA	GD	Pts	Promotion or Relegation
1	Bastia (C, P)	38	21	8	9	61	36	+25	71	Promotion to Ligue 1
2	Reims (P)	38	18	11	9	54	37	+17	65	Promotion to Ligue 1
3	Troyes (P)	38	17	13	8	45	35	+10	64	Promotion to Ligue 1
4	Sedan	38	15	14	9	56	45	+11	59	
5	Clermont	38	15	13	10	48	39	+9	58	

Source: Ligue 2
Rules for classification: 1) points; 2) goal difference; 3) number of goals scored.
(C) Champions; (P) Promoted

==== Results summary ====
Overall								Home						Away					
Pld	W	D	L	GF	GA	GD	Pts	W	D	L	GF	GA	GD	W	D	L	GF	GA	GD
38	21	8	9	61	36	+25	71	15	4	0	44	16	+28	6	4	9	17	20	−3

Last updated: 19 May 2012.
Source: lfp.fr

==== Results by round ====
Round	1	2	3	4	5	6	7	8	9	10	11	12	13	14	15	16	17	18	19	20	21	22	23	24	25	26	27	28	29	30	31	32	33	34	35	36	37	38
Ground	H	A	H	A	H	A	H	A	H	A	H	A	H	A	A	H	A	H	A	H	A	H	A	H	A	H	A	H	A	H	H	A	H	A	H	A	H	A
Result	W	W	W	L	D	L	D	L	W	W	D	D	W	L	D	D	W	W	W	W	L	W	W	W	D	W	W	W	D	W	W	L	W	L	W	L	W	L
Position	1	1	1	3	2	4	6	7	4	3	3	4	3	4	6	6	4	3	3	2	3	3	1	1	1	1	1	1	1	1	1	1	1	1	1	1	1	1

Source: lfp.fr
A = Away; H = Home; W = Win; D = Draw; L = Loss

==== Matches ====
29 July 2011 1	Bastia	3–1	Istres	Bastia, France
	Khazri 19'; Suarez 61' (pen.), 90' (pen.); Périatambée (yellow card) 66'; Cioni (yellow card) 73'	Report	(yellow card) 41' Barrillon; (red card) 82' Flegeau; 86' Yahia-Chérif; (red card) 88' Palmieri	Stadium: Stade Armand Cesari; Attendance: 7,975; Referee: Frank Schneider

5 August 2011 2	Nantes	0–2	Bastia	Nantes, France
	Gakpe (yellow card) 62'	Report	61' Khazri; 65' Suarez	Stadium: Stade de la Beaujoire; Attendance: 13,492; Referee: Jean-Charles Cailleux

12 August 2011 3	Bastia	1–0	Le Mans	Bastia, France
	Cahuzac (yellow card) 39' (red card) 45'; Choplin 59'; M. Robail (yellow card) 61'; M. Novaes (yellow card) 81'	Report	(red card) 45' Ouali; (yellow card) 65' F. Cissé; (yellow card) 89' Narry	Stadium: Stade Armand Cesari; Attendance: 12,547; Referee: Olivier Thual

19 August 2011 4	Le Havre	2–0	Bastia	Le Havre, France
	Genton (yellow card) 35'; Ryan Graca 61'; Bonnet (yellow card) 76'; François (yellow card) 79'; Fontaine 90+1'	Report	(yellow card) 37' Choplin; (yellow card) 79' Cioni	Stadium: Stade Jules Deschaseaux; Attendance: 8,040; Referee: Benoît Bastien

26 August 2011 5	Bastia	1–1	Clermont	Bastia, France
	Suarez 37' (pen.), (yellow card) 41'	Report	(red card) 36' Avinel; 65' (pen.) Alessandrini; (yellow card) 68' Rivière; (yellow card) 90+1' M. Dembélé	Stadium: Stade Armand Cesari; Attendance: 10,427; Referee: Tony Chapron

9 September 2011 6	Troyes	1–0	Bastia	Troyes, France
	Caceres 7'; Psaume (yellow card) 88'	Report		Stadium: Stade de l'Aube; Attendance: 6,663; Referee: Laurent Duhamel

16 September 2011 7	Bastia	1–1	AS Monaco	Bastia, France
	Maoulida 39', (yellow card) 59' (red card) 90+2'; Harek (yellow card) 17'	Report	(yellow card) 21', (goal) 74' Eysseric; (yellow card) 51' Muratori; (yellow card) 86' J. Carrasso; (red card) 90+2' Adriano	Stadium: Stade Armand Cesari; Attendance: 11,994; Referee: Hervé Piccirillo

20 September 2011 8	Reims	1–0	Bastia	Reims, France
	Ghilas 22'; Weber (yellow card) 32'; Mandi (yellow card) 48'; R. Amalfitano (yellow card) 53'; Déaux (yellow card) 90+5'	Report	(yellow card) 57' Mary; (yellow card) 88' Cahuzac	Stadium: Stade Auguste Delaune II; Attendance: 11,191; Referee: Wilfried Bien

23 September 2011 9	Bastia	3–1	Angers	Bastia, France
	Diallo 7'; Genest 26'; Cioni (yellow card) 52'; El-Azzouzi 77'	Report	(yellow card) 71', (goal) 74' Charbonnier	Stadium: Stade Armand Cesari; Attendance: 8,432; Referee: Fredy Faturel

3 October 2011 10	Boulogne	1–3	Bastia	Boulogne-sur-Mer, France
	Gace (yellow card) 11'; Capoue (yellow card) 28'; Allart 43'; Damour (yellow card) 73'	Report	(yellow card) 14', (goal) 20' Harek; 65' Choplin; 89' Diallo	Stadium: Stade de la Libération; Attendance: 8,554; Referee: Didier Falcone

15 October 2011 11	Bastia	2–2	Lens	Bastia, France
	Cahuzac (yellow card) 24'; Maoulida 45+1'; Choplin (yellow card) 51'; Rothen (yellow card) 55'; Khazri (yellow card) 61'; Diallo 83'; Cioni (red card) 89'	Report	(yellow card) 7' Aurier; 27', (yellow card) 67' Pollet; (yellow card) 28', (goal) 38' Eduardo; (yellow card) 77' Baal; (yellow card) 82' Ducasse; (red card) 89' Cichero; (red card) 89' S. Sow	Stadium: Stade Armand Cesari; Attendance: 10,933; Referee: Benoît Bastien

21 October 2011 12	Amiens	1–1	Bastia	Amiens, France
	Zobiri 44'; J. Paul (yellow card) 90'	Report	30', (yellow card) 86' Sans	Stadium: Stade de la Licorne; Attendance: 9,793; Referee: Philippe Kalt

28 October 2011 13	Bastia	3–0	Arles	Créteil, France
	Genest 22'; Khazri 36', 79', (yellow card) 72'; Moizini (yellow card) 66'; Cahuzac (yellow card) 81'	Report	(yellow card) 7' Elie; (yellow card) 37' Najih; (yellow card) 49' Draman	Stadium: Stade Dominique Duvauchelle; Attendance: 1,023; Referee: Stéphane Lannoy

5 November 2011 14	Laval	1–0	Bastia	Laval, France
	Levrat (yellow card) 48'; Talmont (yellow card) 77'; Viale 87'; Belaud (yellow card) 90+3'	Report	(yellow card) 4' Harek; (yellow card) 65' Rothen; (yellow card) 72' Khazri; (yellow card) 75' Cahuzac; (yellow card) 90+1' G. Angoula	Stadium: Stade Francis le Basser; Attendance: 5,354; Referee: Mikael Lesage

25 November 2011 15	Guingamp	1–1	Bastia	Guingamp, France
	Douniama 10', (yellow card) 40'; Lévêque (yellow card) 53'	Report	(yellow card) 10' G. Angoula; 14' Maoulida; (red card) 21' Cahuzac; (yellow card) 39' Choplin; (yellow card) 89' Rothen; (yellow card) 90+3' Sanaia	Stadium: Stade du Roudourou; Attendance: 14,251; Referee: Amaury Delerue

2 December 2011 16	Bastia	2–2	Sedan	Bastia, France
	Sans (yellow card) 42'; Khazri 45', (yellow card) 88'; Rothen (yellow card) 85'; F. Marque 90+4'	Report	(yellow card) 20' F. Pogba; (yellow card) 31', (goal) 57' M. Diallo; (yellow card) 76' Eudeline; 87' Sliti	Stadium: Stade Armand Cesari; Attendance: 9,074; Referee: Sébastien Moreira

16 December 2011 17	Châteauroux	0–2	Bastia	Châteauroux, France
	Fernando Neves (yellow card) 24'; Scaramozzino (yellow card) 55'; Beauvue (yellow card) 90'	Report	75' Diallo; 79' Maoulida	Stadium: Stade Gaston Petit; Attendance: 4,768; Referee: Florent Batta

20 December 2011 18	Bastia	4–1	Tours	Bastia, France
	Choplin 21'; Maoulida 25', 73'; Mary (yellow card) 37'; Sans (yellow card) 68'; S. Diallo 50'	Report	(yellow card) 24' Cardy; 52' Biancardini; (yellow card) 77' Genevois; (red card) 85' B. Leroy	Stadium: Stade Armand Cesari; Attendance: 8,083; Referee: Benoît Millot

14 January 2012 19	Metz	0–1	Bastia	Metz, France
	K. Diaz (yellow card) 74'	Report	(yellow card) 24' Choplin; 90' Maoulida; (yellow card) 90+4' Cioni	Stadium: Stade Saint-Symphorien; Attendance: 7,946; Referee: Fredy Faturel

18 January 2012 20	Bastia	1–0	Le Havre	Bastia, France
	Harek (yellow card) 40'; Rothen 82'	Report	(yellow card) 17' François; (yellow card) 38' Mesloub	Stadium: Stade Armand Cesari; Attendance: 8,398; Referee: Didier Falcone

28 January 2012 21	Clermont	2–1	Bastia	Clermont-Ferrand, France
	Landre (red card) 8'; Bayod (yellow card) 36'; M. Dembele 45+3'; Saiss (yellow card) 65'; B. Morel 74'	Report	23', (yellow card) 23' Maoulida; (red card) 51' Khazri; (yellow card) 51' Cahuzac	Stadium: Stade Gabriel Montpied; Attendance: 5,355; Referee: Sébastien Desiage

4 February 2012 22	Bastia	5–1	Troyes	Bastia, France
	Suarez 11' (pen.); Maoulida 14'; Cahuzac (yellow card) 51'; El-Azzouzi 55', 80'; Harek 81'	Report	18' M. Camara	Stadium: Stade Armand Cesari; Attendance: 7,272; Referee: Philippe Kalt

13 February 2012 23	AS Monaco	0–1	Bastia	Fontvieille, Monaco
	Afolabi (yellow card) 27'	Report	(yellow card) 33' Mary; 86' S. Diallo	Stadium: Stade Louis II; Attendance: 3,024; Referee: Antony Gautier

17 February 2012 24	Bastia	1–0	Reims	Bastia, France
	S. Diallo (yellow card) 18'; Khazri 90+1'	Report	(yellow card) 15' Mandi; (yellow card) 41' Ghilas; (yellow card) 68' Deaux	Stadium: Stade Armand Cesari; Attendance: 10,941; Referee: Pascal Viléo

24 February 2012 25	Angers	1–1	Bastia	Angers, France
	Auriac (yellow card) 13'; Fall (yellow card) 39'; Charbonnier 63' (pen.); Djellabi (yellow card) 65'	Report	(yellow card) 30' Cahuzac; (yellow card) 44' Choplin; 60', (yellow card) 62' El-Azzouzi; (yellow card) 65' Harek; (yellow card) 78' G. Angoula	Stadium: Stade Jean Bouin; Attendance: 5,869; Referee: Franck Schneider

2 March 2012 26	Bastia	2–0	Boulogne	Bastia, France
	El-Azzouzi 54', 66'	Report	(yellow card) 79' Cianci	Stadium: Stade Armand Cesari; Attendance: 10,121; Referee: Philippe Malige

12 March 2012 27	Lens	1–3	Bastia	Lens, France
	Bergdich (yellow card) 53'; B.-F. Koita 67'; Ducasse (yellow card) 85'	Report	(yellow card) 43' Thauvin; 47' El-Azzouzi; 55' (pen.), (yellow card) 85' Rothen; 58' Maoulida; (yellow card) 77' Khazri	Stadium: Stade Félix-Bollaert; Attendance: 21,408; Referee: Clément Turpin

16 March 2012 28	Bastia	2–1	Amiens	Bastia, France
	Rothen 17'; Mienniel 39' (o.g.); El-Azzouzi (yellow card) 69'; Suarez (yellow card) 74'	Report	9' Touzghar; (yellow card) 40' Ielsch; (yellow card) 47' O. Cissé	Stadium: Stade Armand Cesari; Attendance: 10,027; Referee: Wilfried Bien

23 March 2012 29	Arles	0–0	Bastia	Avignon, France
	O. N'Diaye (yellow card) 53'; B. Baldé (yellow card) 89'	Report	(yellow card) 45' Mary; (yellow card) 77' Cahuzac	Stadium: Parc des Sports; Attendance: 4,407; Referee: Mikaël Lesage

30 March 2012 30	Bastia	3–2	Laval	Bastia, France
	Suarez 18', 61'; Maoulida 32'; Cahuzac (yellow card) 56'	Report	48', (yellow card) 68' Do Marcolino; 65' Pallois; (yellow card) 77' L. Rose	Stadium: Stade Armand Cesari; Attendance: 9,725; Referee: Benoît Millot

6 April 2012 31	Bastia	3–1	Guingamp	Bastia, France
	Khazri 15', 82'; Marque (yellow card) 51'; Diallo (yellow card) 54'; G. Angoula (yellow card) 58'; Suarez 73'	Report	(yellow card) 23' M. Diallo; 85' Mandanne	Stadium: Stade Armand Cesari; Attendance: 9,813; Referee: Olivier Thual

13 April 2012 32	Sedan	2–0	Bastia	Sedan, France
	J. Lemoigne 40'; I. Traoré 76'	Report	(yellow card) 20' Cahuzac; (yellow card) 51' Khazri; (yellow card) 54' Choplin	Stadium: Stade Louis Dugauguez; Attendance: 8,016; Referee: Nicolas Rainville

23 April 2012 33	Bastia	2–1	Châteauroux	Bastia, France
	Khazri 18', (yellow card) 43'; G. Angoula (yellow card) 33'; Maoulida 39'	Report	(yellow card) 33' Fernando Neves; 43' R. Fournier	Stadium: Stade Armand Cesari; Attendance: 13,584; Referee: Jean-Charles Cailleux

27 April 2012 34	Tours	2–1	Bastia	Tours, France
	Rigonato 39', (yellow card) 46'; Ghariani 59', (yellow card) 28'; Cardy (yellow card) 77'	Report	(yellow card) 40' Cahuzac; 71' El-Azzouzi	Stadium: Stade de la Vallée du Cher; Attendance: 5,388; Referee: Didier Falcone

1 May 2012 35	Bastia	3–0	Metz	Bastia, France
	Diallo 29', 35'; Maoulida 68'	Report	(yellow card) 48' S. Besle	Stadium: Stade Armand Cesari; Attendance: 13,581; Referee: Frank Schneider

4 May 2012 36	Le Mans	3–0	Bastia	Le Mans, France
	Belfort 18'; I. Sylla 64'; F. Thomas 74' (pen.); Ekeng-Ekeng (yellow card) 85'	Report	(yellow card) 9' Maoulida; (yellow card) 34' Périatambée	Stadium: MMArena; Attendance: 16,083; Referee: Lionel Jaffredo

11 May 2012 37	Bastia	2–1	Nantes	Bastia, France
	Rothen 40'; Suarez 45'	Report	32' Pancrate; (yellow card) 74' Veigneau	Stadium: Stade Armand Cesari; Attendance: 13,916; Referee: Stéphane Jochem

18 May 2012 38	Istres	1–0	Bastia	Istres, France
	Akrour 41'	Report		Stadium: Stade Parsemain; Attendance: 2,818; Referee: Phillipe Malige

=== Coupe de France ===
20 November 2011 7. round	La Seyne sur Mer Entente FC	0–8	Bastia	Toulon, France
14:00 UTC	F. Mendy (yellow card) 7'; S. Mendy (yellow card) 54'; D. Gomis (yellow card) 66'; Graziani (yellow card) 71'	Report	(yellow card) 5' Périatambée; 6', 11' Maoulida; 36' G. Angoula; 39', 73', 88', (yellow card) 45' Suarez; 57' Moizini; 70' Sans	Stadium: Stade de Bon Rencontre; Attendance: 3,500; Referee: Malige Philippe

12 December 2011 8. round	Louhans	0–4	Bastia	Louhans, France
19:15 UTC	S. Sow (yellow card) 81'	Report	44', 74' Maoulida; 80' S. Diallo; 90+3' Genest	Stadium: Stade du Bram; Attendance: 2,500; Referee: Sébastien Desiage

8 January 2012 Round of 64	Bastia	4–1	Sochaux	Bastia, France
19:45 UTC	Choplin 1'; Suarez 13', 70'; Mary (yellow card) 27'; Khazri 74'	Report	57' Mikari; (yellow card) 82' Bakambu	Stadium: Stade Armand Cesari; Attendance: 10,800; Referee: Ruddy Buquet

22 January 2012 Round of 32	Valenciennes	3–1	Bastia	Valenciennes, France
17:00 UTC	Mater (yellow card) 25'; F. Kadir 29', 60'; Danic 58'	Report	(yellow card) 22' Maoulida; 25' (pen.), (yellow card) 33' (yellow-red card) Rothen; (yellow card) 47' Cioni	Stadium: Stade du Hainaut; Attendance: 12,470; Referee: Alexandre Castro

=== Coupe de la Ligue ===
22 July 2011 1. round	Istres	3–2	Bastia	Fos-sur-Mer, France
19:00 UTC	Akrour 28'; Palmieri (yellow card) 51' de Préville 58'; Melliti (yellow card) 61'; Dielna 88'	Report	26' Diallo; 29', (yellow card) 80' Sans; (yellow card) 69' Mary	Stadium: Stade Parsemain; Attendance: 1,584; Referee: Hakim Ben El Hadj

== Statistics ==
=== Squad statistics ===
As of 23 April 2012

	League	Cup	League Cup	Total Stats
Games played	38	4	1	43
Games won	21	3	0	24
Games drawn	8	0	0	8
Games lost	9	1	1	11
Goals for	61	17	2	80
Goals against	36	4	3	43
Yellow cards	68	6	2	76
Red cards	5	1	0	6

Last updated: May 2012
Source: LFP (Matches, goals, cards, etc.)

=== Top scorers ===
As of 23 April 2012

Place	Position	Nation	Number	Name	Ligue 2	Coupe de France	Coupe de la Ligue	Total
1	FW		8	Toifilou Maoulida	13	4	0	17
2	FW		23	David Suarez	9	5	0	14
3	FW		10	Wahbi Khazri	9	1	0	10
=	FW		2	Sadio Diallo	8	1	1	10
5	FW		9	Yassin El-Azzouzi	8	0	0	8
6	MF		25	Jérôme Rothen	4	1	0	5
7	DF		24	Jérémy Choplin	3	1	0	4
8	FW		7	Ludovic Genest	2	1	0	3
=	DF		20	Matthieu Sans	1	1	1	3
10	DF		21	Féthi Harek	2	0	0	2
11	DF		11	François Marque	1	0	0	1
=	MF		6	Gaël Angoula	0	1	0	1
=	MF		13	Salim Moizini	0	1	0	1
Own goal
Place	Position	Nation	Number	Name	Total	Comp., date and minute	Player's team	Note(s)
1	DF		17	Thomas Mienniel	1	Ligue 2 / 16 March 2012 / 39.	Amiens	2 – 1
TOTALS					Ligue 2	Coupe de France	Coupe de la Ligue	Total
TOTALS					61	17	2	80

=== League top assists ===
As of 30 March 2012

Place	Position	Nation	Number	Name	Assists
1	FW		10	Wahbi Khazri	7
=	MF		25	Jérôme Rothen	7
3	FW		8	Toifilou Maoulida	5
4	FW		2	Sadio Diallo	2
=	MF		14	Mathieu Robail	2
=	FW		7	Ludovic Genest	2
7	MF		6	Gaël Angoula	1
=	MF		13	Salim Moizini	1
=	DF		20	Matthieu Sans	1
=	DF		29	Gilles Cioni	1
=	DF		21	Féthi Harek	1
=	MF		33	Florent André	1
=	FW		9	Yassin El-Azzouzi	1

=== Disciplinary record ===
As of 23 April 2012

Number	Nation	Position	Name	Ligue 2		Coupe de France		Coupe de la Ligue		Total	
Number	Nation	Position	Name	Yellow card	Red card	Yellow card	Red card	Yellow card	Red card	Yellow card	Red card
18		MF	Yannick Cahuzac	12	2	0	0	0	0	12	2
10		FW	Wahbi Khazri	7	1	0	0	0	0	7	1
24		DF	Jérémy Choplin	6	0	0	0	0	0	6	0
25		MF	Jérôme Rothen	5	0	1	1	0	0	7	1
21		DF	Féthi Harek	5	0	0	0	0	0	5	0
6		MF	Gaël Angoula	5	0	0	0	0	0	5	0
19		DF	Maka Mary	4	0	1	0	1	0	6	0
29		DF	Gilles Cioni	4	1	1	0	0	0	5	1
20		DF	Matthieu Sans	3	0	0	0	1	0	4	0
8		FW	Toifilou Maoulida	3	0	1	0	0	0	4	0
23		FW	David Suarez	2	0	1	0	0	0	3	0
9		FW	Yassin El-Azzouzi	2	0	0	0	0	0	2	0
2		DF	Sadio Diallo	2	0	0	0	0	0	2	0
4		MF	Jacques-Désiré Périatambée	2	0	1	0	0	0	3	0
1		GK	Macedo Novaes	1	0	0	0	0	0	1	0
14		MF	Mathieu Robail	1	0	0	0	0	0	1	0
13		MF	Salim Moizini	1	0	0	0	0	0	1	0
3		DF	Amiran Sanaia	1	0	0	0	0	0	1	0
17		FW	Florian Thauvin	1	0	0	0	0	0	1	0
11		DF	François Marque	1	0	0	0	0	0	1	0
			TOTALS	68	3	6	1	2	0	76	4

== Reserves and academy ==
SC Bastia
2011–12 season
- Stadium: Stade Armand Cesari
- CFA 2: Group D, 4th
- Championnat National U-19: Group D, 8th
- Coupe Gambardella: TBA
- Championnat National U-17: Group D, 11th

CFA Manager	Frédéric Née
U-19 Manager	Ghislain Printant
U-17 Manager	Olivier Sbaiz
Physical Trainer	Jérémie Collon
Goalkeeping Coach	Ange Filiberti
Head Doctor	Louis Calendini
Physiotherapist	Henry Battesti
Ground (capacity and dimensions)	Stade Armand Cesari (10,460 / -)

Source: SC Bastia.net

=== CFA 2 ===
==== Reserve squad ====
Updated 15 January 2012 Note: Flags indicate national team as defined under FIFA eligibility rules; some limited exceptions apply. Players may hold more than one non-FIFA nationality.

No.	Pos.	Nation	Player
—	GK	FRA	Florian Baccarelli
—	GK	FRA	Thomas Vincensini
—	DF	FRA	Makonnen Guillaume
—	DF	FRA	Jean-Pierre Folacci
—	DF	FRA	Dumè Galeazzi
—	DF	FRA	Pierre-François Sodini
—	DF	FRA	Jean-Joseph Miserazzi
—	DF	FRA	Thibault Valéry
—	DF	FRA	Olivier Vannucci
—	MF	FRA	Florent André
—	MF	FRA	Joris Correa
—	MF	FRA	Gaël Angoula

No.	Pos.	Nation	Player
—	MF	FRA	Matthias Llambrich
—	MF	FRA	Thierry N'Joh Eboa
—	MF	FRA	Nicolas Di Fraya
—	MF	FRA	Nabil Aankour
—	MF	FRA	Christophe Vincent
—	FW	FRA	Romain Achilli
—	FW	FRA	François Massimi
—	FW	FRA	Dimitri Sarasar
—	FW	FRA	Amadou N'Diaye
—	FW	FRA	Yassin El-Azzouzi
—	FW	FRA	Florian Thauvin
—	FW	FRA	Ludovic Genest

==== League table ====
Pos	Team	Pld	W	D	L	GF	GA	GD	Pts
2	Bourges	30	15	8	7	46	30	+16	83
3	Clermont Reserves	30	15	8	7	47	33	+14	83
4	Bastia Reserves	30	15	7	8	55	40	+15	82
5	Andrézieux	30	15	6	9	61	34	+27	81
6	Cournon	30	13	5	12	47	49	−2	74

Updated to match(es) played on 2 June 2012. Source: French Football Federation
Rules for classification: 1) points; 2) goal difference; 3) number of goals scored.

==== Matches ====
Date	Opponent	H / A	Score	Goal(s)	Attendance	Round
20 August 2011	Imphy Decize	H	3 – 1	El Azzouzi 21', Sarasar 80', 87'	0	1.
27 August 2011	St. Georges	A	2 – 2	El Azzouzi 4', 39'	200	2.
3 September 2011	Thiers	H	2 – 1	Sarasar 34', 75'	?	3.
10 September 2011	Andrézieux	H	2 – 0	Angoula 53', Vincent 87'	?	4.
24 September 2011	Ajaccio Reserves	A	0 – 3	Vanucci 48', N'Diaye 61', Sarasar 88'	?	5.
8 October 2011	Louhans	H	0 – 1		?	6.
22 October 2011	Feurs	A	4 – 0	Galeazzi (red card) 67'	?	7.
10 December 2011	Bourges	H	1 – 0	Achilli 31'	?	8.
7 January 2012	Échirolles	A	4 – 2	Genest 55', N'Diaye 85'	?	9.
26 November 2011	Vierzon	H	2 – 1	Sarasar 36', N'Diaye 54' (pen.)	?	10.
3 December 2011	Clermont Foot Reserves	A	1 – 1	Sarasar 54'	?	11.
21 January 2012	Cournon	H	6 – 2	El-Azzouzi 20', 23', 49', Thauvin 21', 53', Sarasar 90+2'	?	12.
15 January 2012	Châteauroux Reserves	A	3 – 0		?	13.
28 January 2012	Mâcon	H	4 – 0	Vincent 38', Sarasar 42', Vannucci 44', Achilli 84'	?	14.
14 March 2012	Montceau	A	2 – 1	Galeazzi 87'	?	15.
7 April 2012	US Saint-Georges	H	4 – 2	Massimi 13', Sodini 54', Vincent 65', Di Fraya 67'	?	16.
28 March 2012	Thiers	A	2 – 2	N'diaye 79', 89'	?	17.
4 February 2012	Andrézieux	A	4 – 0	–	?	18.
10 March 2012	Ajaccio	H	2 – 0	Llambrich 32', Barbato 58'	?	19.
17 March 2012	Louhans	A	0 – 0	–	?	20.
24 March 2012	Feurs	H	1 – 1	Massimi 12'	?	21.
31 March 2012	Bourges	A	0 – 0	–	?	22.
14 April 2012	Échirolles	H	4–2	El-Azzouzi 1', 80', Genest 2', 28'	?	23.
21 April 2012	Vierzon	A	1–2	Moizini 85', Barbato 88'	?	24.
28 April 2012	Clermont Foot Reserves	H	4–0	N'Diaye 23', 90+1', Barbato 47', André 72' (pen.)	?	25.
4 May 2012	Cournon	A	0–4	André (red card) 34', Thauvin 59', Sodini 65', Vincent 82', Moizini 85'	?	26.
12 May 2012	Châteauroux	H	2–2	N'Diaye 54', Moizini 69'	?	27.
20 May 2012	Mâcon	A	0–1	Perbet 36' (o.g.)	?	28.
26 May 2012	Montceau	H	0–1	–	?	29.
2 June 2012	Imphy Decize	A	3–0	–	?	30.

Source: foot-national.com CFA2; Group D, Fixtures/Results and Corse Football Bastia 2011–2012 Updated: 31 May 2012.

=== U-19 ===
==== U-19 squads ====
Updated 1 February 2012

Note: Flags indicate national team as defined under FIFA eligibility rules; some limited exceptions apply. Players may hold more than one non-FIFA nationality.

No.	Pos.	Nation	Player
—	GK	FRA	Raphaël Barallini
—	DF	FRA	Alexander Djiku
—	DF	FRA	Pierrick Andrei
—	DF	FRA	Franck Rybka
—	DF	FRA	Yannick Togandé
—	DF	FRA	Anthony Féliciano
—	MF	FRA	Sébastien Parmentier

No.	Pos.	Nation	Player
—	MF	FRA	Anthony Arnaudo
—	MF	FRA	Kévin Doncarli
—	MF	FRA	Taoufik El Faqui
—	FW	FRA	Harisson Manzala
—	FW	FRA	Joseph Barbato
—	FW	FRA	John N'Komb N'Komb

==== Matches ====
Date	Opponent	H / A	Score	Round
28 August 2011	Montferrand	H	1–0	1.
3 September 2011	Montpellier	A	2–1	2.
10 September 2011	Nice	H	0–1	3.
18 September 2011	Nîmes	A	0–6	4.
25 September 2011	St. Etienne	H	4–0	5.
2 October 2011	Marseille	A	0–0	6.
15 October 2011	Lyon	H	1–3	7.
23 October 2011	Grenoble	A	2–2	8.
6 November 2011	Cannes	H	0–1	9.
13 November 2011	Ajaccio	A	0–1	10.
20 November 2011	AS Monaco	H	2–4	11.
27 November 2011	Lattes	A	1–1	12.
4 December 2011	Furiani-Agliani	A	1–2	13.
11 December 2011	Montpellier	H	4–2	14.
15 January 2012	Nice	A	5–2	15.
22 January 2012	Nîmes	H	4–2	16.
8 April 2012	St. Etienne	A	5–0	17.
12 February 2012	Marseille	H	3–0	18.
25 February 2012	Lyon	A	3–1	19.
4 March 2012	Grenoble	H	8–2	20.
18 March 2012	Cannes	A	1–0	21.
24 March 2012	Ajaccio	H	1–1	22.
22 April 2012	AS Monaco	A	8–2	23.
18 April 2012	Lattes	H	4–1	24.
13 May 2012	Furiani-Agliani	H	13–0	25.
20 May 2012	Montferrand	A	1–3	26.

Source: France Football Federation – Championnat National U-19 – SC Bastia U-19 Results/Fixtures. Updated: 31 May 2012.

=== U-17 ===
==== U-17 squads ====
Updated 3 February 2012

Note: Flags indicate national team as defined under FIFA eligibility rules; some limited exceptions apply. Players may hold more than one non-FIFA nationality.

No.	Pos.	Nation	Player
—	GK	FRA	Florent Maddaloni
—	GK	FRA	Sébastien Mori
—	DF	FRA	Azzedine Azzioui
—	DF	FRA	Adrien Pianelli
—	DF	FRA	Nicolas Berti
—	DF	FRA	Marc-Antoine Blanc
—	DF	FRA	Marc Chabert
—	DF	FRA	Roy Gwadi
—	MF	FRA	Sacha Valery

No.	Pos.	Nation	Player
—	MF	FRA	Jules Lorenzi
—	MF	FRA	Christophe Chiaroni
—	MF	FRA	Ange Capotosto
—	MF	FRA	Adrien Cinquini
—	MF	FRA	Corentin Fourni
—	FW	FRA	Sébastien Giambernardi
—	FW	FRA	Christopher Ibayi
—	FW	FRA	Jacques-Pierre Palmari
—	FW	FRA	Anthony Saffour
