= 2010–11 SC Bastia season =

SC Bastia
2010–11 season
- Chairman: Julien Lolli
- Manager: Frédéric Hantz
- Stadium: Stade Armand Cesari
- Championnat National: 1st (Champion and promoted to Ligue 2)
- Coupe de France: 7. tour
- Coupe de la Ligue: End of 16
- Top goalscorer: League: David Suarez (20); All: David Suarez (23)
- Highest home attendance: 7,899 vs Cannes; 12 February 2011
- Lowest home attendance: 2,779 vs Luzenac; 17 December 2010
Home colours	Away colours

Corsican football club SC Bastia finished the 2010–11 season as champions of the French Championnat National and was promoted to Ligue 2. The club's top scorer of the season was David Suarez with 23 goals in 20 league matches. SC Bastia reached the 7th round of the Coupe de France and the last 16 of the Coupe de la Ligue. In May 2010, prior to the season, manager Faruk Hadžibegić was replaced by Frédéric Hantz.

== Season overview ==
SC Bastia had run up an operating deficit of €1.2 million in the previous financial year. On 15 June 2010, following a review of each club's administrative and financial accounts in the Championnat National, the Direction Nationale du Contrôle de Gestion (DNCG) ruled that Bastia and Gueugnon would be relegated to the Championnat de France amateur. Both Bastia and Gueugnon had the option to appeal the decision. On 25 June 2010, the Corsican Assembly and the General Council of Haute-Corse approved grants of €800,000 and €150,000 to be given to Bastia in order for the club to meet the DNCG's financial requirements, which would allow the club to remain in the Championnat National. However, on 6 July, the DNCG remained firm on its stance relegating the club to the fourth division after questioning the legitimacy of the grants and the sale of the club's training center. Bastia president, Julien Lolli, remained confident that the club would play in the Championnat National and issued an appeal to the CNOSF, the National Sporting Committee of France, the same day. On 2 July, the DNCG announced that Gueugnon would remain in National after the club successfully appealed to the organisation. On 16 July, the CNOSF ruled against the DNCG and announced that Bastia should play in the Championnat National. The club's place in the league was confirmed upon the release of the league table.

On 15 June, Bastia announced the signing of Jérémy Choplin and Gaël Angoula on free transfers, from Rodez and Pacy Vallée-d'Eure respectively. Christophe Gaffory left the club for Vannes for a transfer fee of €50,000.

Bastia exited the Coupe de la Ligue in the round of 16, losing 4–0 to Auxerre on 27 October. During the match, fans used pyrotechnics and threw objects onto the pitch. According to the LFP's disciplinary committee, Bastia club officials hindered the arrest of the guilty individuals while an Auxerre steward sustained injuries. As a result of these incidents the disciplinary committee excluded Bastia from the following year's edition of the league cup in December.

== Transfers ==
=== In ===
Pos.	Name	Fee	From
Summer
DF	(France) Matthieu Sans	Free	(France) Arles
DF	(France) Gilles Cioni	Free	(France) Paris FC
DF	(France) Jérémy Choplin	Free	(France) Rodez
DF	(France) Maka Mary	Free	(France) Le Havre
MF	(France) Gaël Angoula	Free	(France) Pacy Vallée-d'Eure
FW	(France) Yassin El-Azzouzi	Free	(France) Pacy Vallée-d'Eure
FW	(France) David Suarez	Free	(France) Sedan
FW	(Guinea) Idrissa Sylla	Loan	(France) Le Mans
Winter
DF	(Georgia (country)) Amiran Sanaia	Free	(France) Le Mans

=== Out ===
Pos.	Name	Fee	To
Summer
GK	(Cameroon) Jules Goda	Dissolution	Free
DF	(France) Johan Martial	Loan	(France) Brest
DF	(France) Eric Cubilier	Dissolution	Free
DF	(France) Grégory Lorenzi	Returned	(France) Brest
DF	(Benin) Khaled Adénon	Returned	(France) Le Mans
MF	(France) Florent Ghisolfi	Free	(France) Reims
MF	(France) Fabrice Jau	Dissolution	Free
MF	(France) Yohan Gomez	Dissolution	Free
FW	(France) Christophe Gaffory	€50,000	(France) Vannes
FW	(France) Pierre-Yves André	–	Retired
FW	(France) Xavier Pentecôte	Returned	(France) Toulouse
Winter
MF	(Serbia) Darko Dunjić	Mutual agreement	Free
MF	(France) Sony Mustivar	Loan	(France) Orléans
FW	(Ivory Coast) Guy Niangbo	Loan	(Belgium) Tubize

== Squad and statistics ==
As of 27 May 2011

No.	Pos	Nat	Player	Total		Championnat National		Coupe de France		Coupe de la Ligue	
No.	Pos	Nat	Player	Apps	Goals	Apps	Goals	Apps	Goals	Apps	Goals
1	GK	(Brazil) BRA	Macedo Novaes	45	0	38	0	3	0	4	0
2	FW	(Guinea) GUI	Sadio Diallo	41	12	35	10	3	2	3	0
4	MF	(Mauritius) MRI	Jacques-Désiré Périatambée	38	0	33	0	3	0	2	0
7	FW	(France) FRA	Wahbi Khazri	41	7	34	5	3	1	4	1
8	MF	(France) FRA	Gaël Angoula	37	0	30	0	3	0	4	0
9	FW	(France) FRA	Yassin El-Azzouzi	15	5	14	5	0	0	1	0
10	MF	(France) FRA	Jean-Jacques Rocchi	5	0	5	0	0	0	0	0
11	FW	(France) FRA	Alexandre Garcia	16	4	15	4	1	0	0	0
12	MF	(France) FRA	Serisay Barthélémy	17	5	15	5	1	0	1	0
13	MF	(France) FRA	Salim Moizini	39	6	34	5	1	0	4	1
15	MF	(France) FRA	Mathieu Robail	46	12	39	12	3	0	4	0
17	FW	(Ivory Coast) CIV	Nassa Guy Roland Niangbo	4	0	3	0	1	0	0	0
18	MF	(France) FRA	Yannick Cahuzac	33	1	27	1	3	0	3	0
19	DF	(France) FRA	Maka Mary	28	0	22	0	3	0	3	0
20	DF	(France) FRA	Matthieu Sans	39	2	34	1	1	0	4	1
21	DF	(Algeria) ALG	Féthi Harek	38	0	33	0	2	0	3	0
23	FW	(France) FRA	David Suarez	37	22	35	20	2	2	0	0
24	DF	(France) FRA	Jérémy Choplin	39	4	33	3	3	1	3	0
26	MF	(Guinea) GUI	Idrissa Sylla	32	8	27	7	3	1	2	0
29	DF	(France) FRA	Gilles Cioni	39	1	35	1	1	0	3	0
30	GK	(France) FRA	Dominique Agostini	2	0	2	0	0	0	0	0
33	DF	(France) FRA	Pierre-François Sodini	1	0	1	0	0	0	0	0
34	DF	(France) FRA	Olivier Vannucci	1	0	1	0	0	0	0	0
35	DF	(France) FRA	Julien Chevalier	1	0	0	0	1	0	0	0
36	MF	(France) FRA	Amadou N'Diaye	1	0	0	0	1	0	0	0
Playing half a season at the club:
5	DF	(Serbia) SRB	Darko Dunjić	0	0	0	0	0	0	0	0
22	FW	(France) FRA	Sony Mustivar	12	0	12	0	0	0	0	0
27	DF	(Georgia (country)) GEO	Amiran Sanaia	8	0	8	0	0	0	0	0

== Friendly matches ==
4 July 2010	Sélection Corse CFA2-DH	0–5	Bastia	Bastia, France
			5', 31' Khazri; 27' M. Robail; 45' Niangbo; 72' Mustivar

7 July 2010	Bastia	0–1	Ajaccio	Corte, France
		Report	80' (o.g.) Sans	Stadium: Stade Santos-Manfredi

13 July 2010	Rodez	1–1	Bastia	Rodez, France
	Chauchart 41'	Report	84' (pen.) Niangbo	Stadium: Stade Paul-Lignon

16 July 2010	Istres	2–0	Bastia	Port-Saint-Louis-du-Rhône, France
	Ouadah 41'; Bottone 50'	Report

== Competitions ==
=== Championnat National ===
==== League table ====
Pos	Team	Pld	W	D	L	GF	GA	GD	Pts	Promotion or Relegation
1	Bastia (C, P)	40	27	10	3	81	24	+57	91	Promotion to Ligue 2
2	Amiens (P)	40	24	12	4	58	27	+31	84	Promotion to Ligue 2
3	Guingamp (P)	40	23	11	6	87	36	+51	80	Promotion to Ligue 2
4	Strasbourg (D, R)	40	20	17	3	56	27	+29	77	Expelled (Note: Strasbourg and Cannes and Gueugnon were relegated due to bankruptcy.)
5	Cannes (D, R)	40	18	14	8	51	35	+16	68	Expelled

Source: French Football Federation
Rules for classification: 1) points; 2) goal difference; 3) number of goals scored.
(C) Champions; (D) Disqualified; (P) Promoted; (R) Relegated

==== Results summary ====
Overall								Home						Away					
Pld	W	D	L	GF	GA	GD	Pts	W	D	L	GF	GA	GD	W	D	L	GF	GA	GD
40	27	10	3	81	24	+57	91	14	6	0	40	8	+32	13	4	3	41	16	+25

Source: French Football Federation

==== Results by round ====
Round	1	2	3	4	5	6	7	8	9	10	11	12	13	14	15	16	17	18	19	20	21	22	23	24	25	26	27	28	29	30	31	32	33	34	35	36	37	38	39	40	41	42
Ground	H	A	H	A	H	A	H	A	P	H	A	H	A	H	A	H	A	H	A	H	A	H	A	H	A	H	A	H	P	A	H	A	H	A	H	A	H	A	H	A	H	A
Result	W	D	D	W	W	L	W	L	P	W	W	W	W	W	W	W	W	D	W	W	W	D	W	W	D	D	W	W	P	D	W	W	W	W	W	D	D	W	W	W	D	L
Position	9	4	8	3	2	6	3	5	8	4	4	2	1	1	1	1	1	1	1	1	1	1	1	1	1	1	1	1	1	1	1	1	1	1	1	1	1	1	1	1	1	1

Source: French Football Federation
A = Away; H = Home; W = Win; D = Draw; L = Loss; P = Postponed

==== Matches ====
Note: 9. and 29. weeks did not match.

7 August 2010 1	Bastia	1–0	Amiens	Bastia, France
	Choplin (yellow card) 50'; G. Angoula (yellow card) 56'; El-Azzouzi 77'	Report	(yellow card) 32' Poirier; (yellow card) 56' Tainmont; (yellow card) 66' Libohy; (yellow card) 75' (yellow-red card) J. Paul; (yellow card) 85' Cirilli	Stadium: Stade Armand Cesari; Attendance: 4,163; Referee: Didier Falcone

14 August 2010 2	Rodez	0–0	Bastia	Rodez, France
	Lorthioir (yellow card) 8'; Faviana (yellow card) 39'; Laneau (yellow card) 77'	Report	(yellow card) 38' Cahuzac; (yellow card) 85' Périatambée; (yellow card) 86' Choplin	Stadium: Stade Paul Lignon; Attendance: 500; Referee: Sébastien Butault

21 August 2010 3	Bastia	0–0	Rouen	Bastia, France
	Cioni (yellow card) 34'; M. Robail (yellow card) 54'	Report	(yellow card) 43' C. Boateng	Stadium: Stade Armand Cesari; Attendance: 4,181; Referee: Ludovic Rémy

28 August 2010 4	Bayonne	1–2	Bastia	Bayonne, France
	Bidegain 56'; Degoul (yellow card) 65'	Report	42' Suarez; 77', (yellow card) 60' Moizini	Stadium: Stade Didier Deschamps; Attendance: 700; Referee: David Mezouar

4 September 2010 5	Bastia	1–0	Strasbourg	Bastia, France
	Choplin (yellow card) 25'; M. Robail 55'; Sans (yellow card) 68'	Report	(yellow card) 35' Peuguet	Stadium: Stade Armand Cesari; Attendance: 4,408; Referee: Stéphane Bré

10 September 2010 6	Cannes	2–1	Bastia	Cannes, France
	Company (yellow card) 37'; Voavy 74'; Peralta 76'; Grégori (yellow card) 80'; Koller (yellow card) 90'	Report	(yellow card) 39' Cahuzac; (yellow card) 66' Mary; 84' El-Azzouzi	Stadium: Stade Pierre de Coubertin; Attendance: 5,000; Referee: Jérôme Auroux

14 September 2010 7	Bastia	2–0	Guingamp	Bastia, France
	S. Diallo 44', (yellow card) 29'; G. Angoula (yellow card) 45'; M. Robail (yellow card) 83'; Khazri 86'; Cahuzac (yellow card) 88'	Report	(yellow card) 26' Lévêque; (yellow card) 33' Colleau; (yellow card) 45' Allaoui; (yellow card) 55' (yellow-red card) M. Diallo; (yellow card) 88' Mathis	Stadium: Stade Armand Cesari; Attendance: 3,856; Referee: Stéphane Djouzi

18 September 2010 8	Niort	2–0	Bastia	Niort, France
	Gastien 23'; M. Camara (yellow card) 32'; V. Durand (yellow card) 58'; Bernard (yellow card) 86'; Hébras 90'; A. Gonzalez 90+4'	Report	(yellow card) 45' Khazri; (yellow card) 52' (yellow-red card) Mary; (yellow card) 69' Cahuzac; (yellow card) 75' Choplin	Stadium: Stade René Gaillard; Attendance: 3,000; Referee: Guillaume Janin

28 September 2010 10	Bastia	3–0	Colmar	Bastia, France
	M. Robail 3', 38'; Khazri (yellow card) 43'; I. Sylla 70'	Report	(yellow card) 71' N'Siabamfumu; (yellow card) 86' Crequit; (red card) 89' Kittler	Stadium: Stade Armand Cesari; Attendance: 3,812; Referee: Floris Aubin

3 October 2010 11	Paris FC	1–2	Bastia	Paris, France
	Clément (red card) 24'; El Hajaoui (yellow card) 25'; S. Vincent 64'	Report	27' Suarez; 38' S. Diallo; (yellow card) 48' (yellow-red card) Moizini; (yellow card) 64' Périatambée; (yellow card) 84' Novaes; (yellow card) 90' M. Robail; (yellow card) 90' Khazri; (yellow card) 90+2' Harek	Stadium: Stade Charléty; Attendance: 1,258; Referee: Stéphane Jochem

8 October 2010 12	Bastia	5–0	Gap	Bastia, France
	8', 54' Barthélémy; 34' S. Diallo; 38' M. Robail; 76' I. Sylla	Report		Stadium: Stade Armand Cesari; Attendance: 4,800; Referee: Yohann Rouinsard

13 October 2010 13	Gueugnon	1–4	Bastia	Gueugnon, France
	Vairelles 59'; Everson (yellow card) 76'	Report	2', 40' Barthélémy; (yellow card) 34' Novaes; (yellow card) 41' Cahuzac; 66' M. Robail; 86' Suarez	Stadium: Stade Jean Laville; Attendance: 920; Referee: Franck Schneider

23 October 2010 14	Bastia	6–1	Plabennec	Bastia, France
	Suarez 5', 20', 52', 55'; Sans 25', (yellow card) 63'; Khazri 88'	Report	62', (yellow card) 71' J.-M. Abiven; (yellow card) 76' Guéguen	Stadium: Stade Armand Cesari; Attendance: 4,691; Referee: Olivier Husset

5 November 2010 15	Beauvais	1–4	Bastia	Beauvais, France
	Mutamba 53'; L. Mendy (yellow card) 59'; A. Diawara (yellow card) 79'	Report	15' Choplin; 26', 32' Suarez; (yellow card) 45' Harek; 59' M. Robail; (yellow card) 90' (yellow-red card) Cahuzac	Stadium: Stade Pierre Brisson; Attendance: 2,502; Referee: Thomas Leonard

9 November 2010 16	Bastia	1–0	St. Raphael	Bastia, France
	G. Angoula (yellow card) 44'; I. Sylla 90'	Report	(yellow card) 56' D. Moulin	Stadium: Stade Armand Cesari; Attendance: 4,000; Referee: Sébastien Desiage

13 November 2010 17	Pacy Vallée-d'Eure	1–2	Bastia	Pacy-sur-Eure, France
	Elouaari 16'; Nirlo 22'; Domrane (yellow card) 61'; Niakaté (yellow card) 76'	Report	9' Choplin; (yellow card) 50' Suarez; 71' Moizini; (yellow card) 88' Harek	Stadium: Stade Pacy-Ménilles; Attendance: 767; Referee: Jérôme Miguelgorry

27 November 2010 18	Bastia	1–1	Alfortville	Bastia, France
	M. Robail 8'	Report	(yellow card) 61' Reine-Adelaïde; (yellow card) 69' Nascimento; 81' Vaugeois; (yellow card) 88' Pinto	Stadium: Stade Armand Cesari; Attendance: 3,840; Referee: Franck Schneider

12 January 2011 19	Créteil	1–2	Bastia	Créteil, France
	Lesage 6'; Laïfa (yellow card) 34'; Monaghan (yellow card) 76'	Report	61' M. Robail; 62' S. Diallo; (yellow card) 69' Choplin	Stadium: Stade Dominique Duvauchelle; Attendance: 800; Referee: Alexandre Perreau Niel

17 December 2010 20	Bastia	1–0	Luzenac	Bastia, France
	M. Robail 90'; Cahuzac (yellow card) 91'	Report	(yellow card) 9' Akaza; (yellow card) 44' Makalou; (yellow card) 59' Hergault; (yellow card) 69' Malfleury	Stadium: Stade Armand Cesari; Attendance: 2,779; Referee: Floris Aubin

22 December 2010 21	Orléans	0–2	Bastia	Orléans, France
	Sainati (yellow card) 27'; Le Mat (yellow card) 34'; Zahari (yellow card) 50'	Report	(yellow card) 27' Cahuzac; 36' Khazri; 77' S. Diallo; (yellow card) 79' I. Sylla	Stadium: Stade de la Source; Attendance: 1,960; Referee: Alban Hung

15 January 2011 22	Bastia	0–0	Rodez	Bastia, France
	G. Angoula (yellow card) 15'; Périatambée (yellow card) 34'	Report	(yellow card) 31' Ramond; (yellow card) 51' Massot; (yellow card) 89' (yellow-red card) N'Tolla	Stadium: Stade Armand Cesari; Attendance: 3,976; Referee: Johan Hamel

22 January 2011 23	Rouen	0–1	Bastia	Rouen, France
	J.-P. Mendy (yellow card) 9'; G. Ngosso (yellow card) 31'; Vignaud (yellow card) 81'; Goulard (yellow card) 84'	Report	(yellow card) 9' Khazri; (yellow card) 36' Mary; 45' Moizini; (yellow card) 57' Périatambée	Stadium: Stade Robert Diochon; Attendance: 3,480; Referee: Silas Billong

29 January 2011 24	Bastia	4–2	Bayonne	Bastia, France
	Khazri 9'; M. Robail (yellow card) 32'; A. Garcia 71'; El-Azzouzi 87'; S. Diallo 90+1'	Report	(yellow card) 15' Estrade; 30', 86' Gbizié; (yellow card) 45' Pinau; (yellow card) 70' A. Dos Santos	Stadium: Stade Armand Cesari; Attendance: 3,228; Referee: Emmanuel Esneu

5 February 2011 25	Strasbourg	1–1	Bastia	Strasbourg, France
	Outrebon 29'; Pichot (yellow card) 58'; Damour (yellow card) 60' (yellow-red card)	Report	71' A. Garcia; (yellow card) 90+7' M. Robail	Stadium: Stade de la Meinau; Attendance: 6,092; Referee: Christian Guillard

12 February 2011 26	Bastia	0–0	Cannes	Bastia, France
	Choplin (yellow card) 44'; S. Diallo (yellow card) 55'	Report	(yellow card) 4' De Magalhaes	Stadium: Stade Armand Cesari; Attendance: 7,899; Referee: Romain Delpech

18 February 2011 27	Guingamp	2–5	Bastia	Guingamp, France
	Ogunbiyi (yellow card) 15'; M. Diallo 45', (yellow card) 76'; M. Scarpelli 46'; Lévêque (yellow card) 60'; B. Koné (yellow card) 89'	Report	15', 74' Suarez; (yellow card) 25' Périatambée; (yellow card) 45' Cioni; (yellow card) 60' Khazri; 83', 90+1' M. Robail; 90' S. Diallo	Stadium: Stade du Roudourou; Attendance: 12,046; Referee: Olivier Husset

26 February 2011 28	Bastia	2–1	Niort	Bastia, France
	El-Azzouzi 3', 22'; Suarez (yellow card) 13'; Cahuzac (yellow card) 56'	Report	(yellow card) 48' Ricaud; 71' M. Dembélé; (yellow card) 75' M. Camara	Stadium: Stade Armand Cesari; Attendance: 4,938; Referee: Franck Schneider

12 March 2011 30	Colmar	0–0	Bastia	Colmar, France
	Fortuna (yellow card) 27'; Zerara (yellow card) 62'; M'Tir (red card) 70'	Report	(yellow card) 44' Choplin; (red card) 64' Moizini	Stadium: Stade Colmar; Attendance: 1,700; Referee: David Mezouar

19 March 2011 31	Bastia	3–0	Paris FC	Bastia, France
	Suarez 44'; Sans (yellow card) 58'; Cioni (yellow card) 62'; K. Lala 78' (o.g.); S. Diallo 82'	Report	(yellow card) 36' Roye; (yellow card) 45' Vincent	Stadium: Stade Armand Cesari; Attendance: 4,824; Referee: Sébastien Desiage

25 March 2011 32	Gap	0–2	Bastia	Gap, France
	Delclos (yellow card) 34'	Report	7', 26' Suarez; (yellow card) 34' Cahuzac; (yellow card) 74' Cioni	Stadium: Stade Municipal de Provence; Attendance: 1,200; Referee: Silas Billong

1 April 2011 33	Bastia	3–1	Gueugnon	Bastia, France
	Michaud 29' (o.g.); S. Diallo 30'; Suarez 55'	Report	89' Jous	Stadium: Stade Armand Cesari; Attendance: 3,744; Referee: Hakim Ben El Hadj

9 April 2011 34	Plabennec	0–3	Bastia	Plabennec, France
	Mombris (yellow card) 56'; J.-M. Abiven (yellow card) 75'; S. Abiven (yellow card) 90'	Report	13' Moizini; 50' Suarez; 81' A. Garcia	Stadium: Stade Municipal de Kervéguen; Attendance: 1,279; Referee: Thomas Leonard

16 April 2011 35	Bastia	5–1	Beauvais	Bastia, France
	Suarez 16', 28'; Cahuzac (yellow card) 24'; Khazri 63'; Moizini 73'; A. Garcia 89'	Report	(yellow card) 33' (yellow-red card) Milambo; 52' Louisy-Daniel	Stadium: Stade Armand Cesari; Attendance: 4,007; Referee: Benoît Bastien

22 April 2011 36	St. Raphael	1–1	Bastia	Fréjus, France
	Fernandez 57'	Report	30' M. Robail; (yellow card) 88' Cioni	Stadium: Stade Pourcin; Attendance: 2,000; Referee: Jérôme Auroux

26 April 2011 37	Bastia	0–0	Pacy Vallée-d'Eure	Bastia, France
		Report	(yellow card) 32' Niakaté; (yellow card) 68' Cvitkovic	Stadium: Stade Armand Cesari; Attendance: 4,266; Referee: Sylvain Palhies

30 April 2011 38	Alfortville	0–4	Bastia	Alfortville, France
		Report	8' Cahuzac; 29', (yellow card) 78' Barthélémy; 42' Choplin; 67' I. Sylla	Stadium: Stade Parc des sports de Choisy; Attendance: 400; Referee: Jérôme Miguelgorry

7 May 2010 39	Bastia	2–1	Créteil	Bastia, France
	Khazri (yellow card) 53'; Suarez 58'; Choplin (yellow card) 78'; I. Sylla 90+2'	Report	26' Koukou; (yellow card) 43' Galim	Stadium: Stade Armand Cesari; Attendance: 5,186; Referee: Stéphane Djouzi

13 May 2011 40	Luzenac	1–5	Bastia	Luzenac, France
	Camps 81'	Report	6' S. Diallo; 9', 45' I. Sylla; (yellow card) 21' Périatambée; 40' Suarez; 80' Cioni	Stadium: Stade Paul Fédou; Attendance: 1,100; Referee: Johan Hamel

20 May 2011 41	Bastia	0–0	Orléans	Bastia, France
	S. Diallo (yellow card) 36'; G. Angoula (yellow card) 79'	Report	(yellow card) 57' G. Tomas	Stadium: Stade Armand Cesari; Attendance: 7,829; Referee: El Hadj

27 May 2011 42	Amiens	1–0	Bastia	Amiens, France
	Ielsch (yellow card) 40'; Tainmont (yellow card) 54'; Zobiri 64'	Report	(yellow card) 88' G. Angoula	Stadium: Stade de la Licorne; Attendance: 10,957; Referee: Benoît Millot

Source: Foot-National.com, Retrieved on 11 March 2012.

=== Coupe de France ===
17 October 2010 5. tour	Corte	1 – 3 (a.e.t.)	Bastia	Corte, France
	Monfray 2'; Alves Pontes (yellow card) 40' (yellow-red card); Rigam (yellow card) 45'; D'Oliviera (yellow card) 77'; Triches (yellow card) 81'; Baraglioli (yellow card) 90'; Guerrini (yellow card) 115'	Report	(yellow card) 15' Périatambée; (yellow card) 18' Cahuzac; (yellow card) 61' Khazri; 81' Choplin; 96' Diallo; 101' I. Sylla	Stadium: Stade Santos Manfredi; Attendance: 2,000; Referee: Cyril Bianchini

30 October 2010 6. tour	Bastia	5–1	CA Bastia	Bastia, France
	Khazri 52'; Suarez 68', 82'; G. Angoula (yellow card) 77'; S. Diallo 84'; A. Garcia 85'	Report	8' Arnoux; (yellow card) 14' Sorbara; (red card) 64' Grimaldi	Stadium: Stade Armand Cesari; Attendance: 2,800; Referee: Gerard Dany

20 November 2010 7. tour	Istres	2–0	Bastia	Istres, France
	Barrillon (yellow card) ?'; Fettouthi 74'; Lesueur 87'			Stadium: Stade Parsemain; Attendance: 1,402; Referee: Damien Ledentu

=== Coupe de la Ligue ===
30 July 2010 1. tour	Angers	2–2 (2–4 p)	Bastia	Angers, France
19:00 UTC	Keserü 39'; J. Henin 45'; Auriac (yellow card) 54'	Report	46' Moizini; 47' Khazri; (yellow card) 70' Cioni; (yellow card) 106' Choplin	Stadium: Stade Jean Bouin; Attendance: 4,357; Referee: Cédric Cotrel
	Penalties
	Gillet (penalty scored) de Freitas (penalty missed); Diers (penalty missed); M. Stéphan (penalty scored)		(penalty scored) Diallo; (penalty scored) M. Robail; (penalty scored) Choplin; (penalty scored) Barthélémy

24 August 2010 2. tour	Amiens	0–0 (3–4 p)	Bastia	Amiens, France
19:00 UTC	Cirilli (yellow card); Ielsch (yellow card) 27'; Libohy (yellow card) 36'; Mangione (yellow card) 82'	Report	(yellow card) Mary; (yellow card) 39' Cioni; (yellow card) 72' Khazri	Stadium: Stade de la Licorne; Attendance: 2,668; Referee: Benoît Millot
	Penalties
	Cirilli (penalty scored); Mienniel (penalty scored); Djaballah (penalty scored); Zobiri (penalty missed); Atlan (penalty missed)		(penalty scored) Suarez; (penalty scored) Moizini; (penalty scored) M. Robail; (penalty scored) Khazri

22 September 2010 End of 32	Sochaux	0–2	Bastia	Montbéliard, France
19:45 UTC		Report	24' Suarez; (yellow card) 27' Cioni; (yellow card) 35' Khazri; (yellow card) 45+3' S. Diallo; (yellow card) 50' G. Angoula; 52' Sans; (red card) 54' Choplin	Stadium: Stade Auguste Bonal; Attendance: 5,750; Referee: Olivier Thual

27 October 2010 End of 16	Auxerre	4–0	Bastia	Auxerre, France
19:00 UTC	Quercia 8'; Sammaritano 24', 78'; Hengbart 68'; Madiba (yellow card) 81'	Report	(red card) 26' Sans; (red card) 35' Harek; (yellow card) 70' Mary; (yellow card) 74' Moizini	Stadium: Stade de l'Abbé Deschamps; Attendance: 7,557; Referee: Antony Gautier
