= Cirilli =

Cirilli is a surname. Notable people with the surname include:

- Arthur Cirilli (1914–1995), American lawyer, politician, and judge
- Guido Cirilli (1871–1954), Italian architect
- Jean-Charles Cirilli (born 1982), French footballer
