= Niangbo =

Niangbo is a surname. Notable people with the surname include:

- Anderson Niangbo (born 1999), Ivorian footballer
- Guy-Roland Niangbo (born 1986), Ivorian footballer
