= Wahbi Khazri =

Footballer (born 1991)

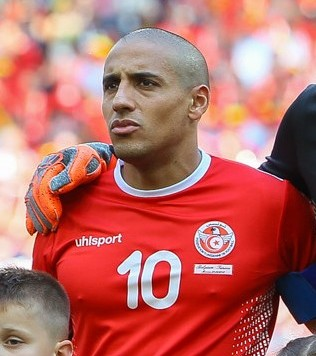
- Khazri lining up with Tunisia at the 2018 FIFA World Cup

Personal information
- Full name: Wahbi Khazri
- Date of birth: 8 February 1991 (age 35)
- Place of birth: Ajaccio, France
- Height: 1.76 m (5 ft 9 in)
- Positions: Attacking midfielder; left winger; forward

Team information
- Current team: Tunisia (Analyst)

Youth career
- 1995–2003: JS Ajaccio
- 2003–2009: Bastia

Senior career*
Years	Team	Apps	(Gls)
2009–2014	Bastia	171	(31)
2014–2016	Bordeaux	52	(14)
2016–2018	Sunderland	38	(3)
2017–2018	→ Rennes (loan)	24	(9)
2018–2022	Saint-Étienne	100	(33)
2022–2025	Montpellier	82	(6)
Total		467	(96)

International career
2009	Tunisia U20	1	(1)
2012	France U21	1	(0)
2013–2022	Tunisia	74	(25)
- * Club domestic league appearances and goals

Wahbi Khazri (Arabic: وَهْبِيّ خَزْرِيّ; born 8 February 1991) is a former professional footballer who played as an attacking midfielder, left winger or forward.

Trained at Bastia from 2004, Khazri made his professional debut there in 2009 and quickly became a vital part of the team, as he helped the club reach promotion to Ligue 2 in 2011, and then Ligue 1 in 2012. He left in 2014 to join fellow French side Bordeaux. In 2016, Khazri joined Sunderland in the Premier League; he was subsequently loaned to Rennes during the 2017–18 campaign. After finishing the season with 11 goals in 29 games, Khazri attracted the attention of Saint-Étienne, who recruited him in July 2018. In 2022, Khazri signed for Montpellier.

Born in France, Khazri represented his birth country at youth international level, and Tunisia at senior international level. He was the former captain of the national team, playing 74 matches and scoring 25 goals between 2013 and 2022. He represented Tunisia at five Africa Cup of Nations tournaments and at both the 2018 and 2022 FIFA World Cup.

== Club career ==
=== Bastia ===
A native of Ajaccio, Khazri started his career with local side Jeunesse Sportive Ajaccio before moving to Bastia. He received his first call up to the senior squad for their match against Amiens on 20 February 2009. He made his debut in that match coming on as a substitute in the 85th minute for Ludovic Genest. Bastia scored the winning goal a minute later to win the match 1–0.

He scored his first career goal on 13 March 2009, in a 1–0 victory over Montpellier. Wahbi quickly established himself as a goalscorer, scoring again a couple of weeks later in a 3–1 win over Vannes. He scored again, this time on the final match day of the season against Troyes, scoring the first goal in a 2–1 victory. The loss meant Troyes would be relegated to the Championnat National.

=== Bordeaux ===
On 1 July 2014, he signed up for four years with the Bordeaux. He played his first match in his new colors on 9 August 2014, on the first day of the 2014–15 season against Montpellier. Bordeaux won by a goal to zero that day. He scored his first goal in his second appearance for Bordeaux, the next day as the Girondins host Monaco on 17 August. He scored his goal on a penalty that he himself caused and thus participated in the victory of his family 4–1.

On 28 September 2014, he scored the 3,400th goal in Girondins history. His first season at the Girondins was a success: he managed to win in the team as a starter and totaled nine goals in 32 league games.

He scored his first goal of the 2015–16 season, in his first match against Reims on 9 August 2015 (defeated by a score of 2–1). On 11 September, he scored a goal in a high-tension match for championship leaders Paris Saint-Germain (PSG); he managed to take the ball from the feet of Kevin Trapp, the opposing goalkeeper, even if the match ended in a 2–2 draw.

=== Sunderland ===
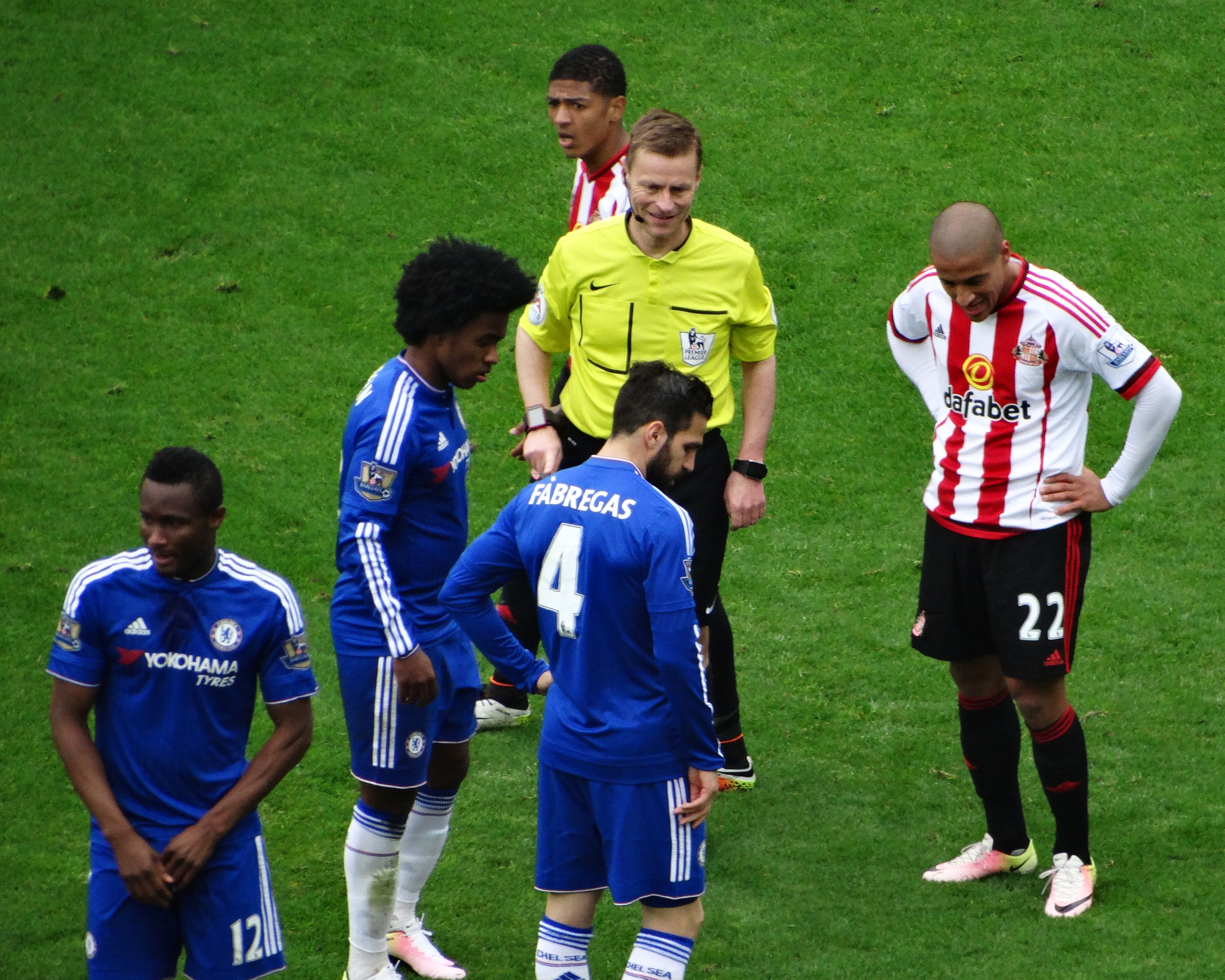
Khazri (right) playing for Sunderland against Chelsea in May 2016

On 30 January 2016, Khazri joined Sunderland on a four-and-a-half-year contract for an undisclosed fee. Khazri scored his first goal for Sunderland against Manchester United on 13 February 2016, opening the scoring with a direct free kick that beat David de Gea at his far post. Khazri later set up Lamine Koné's 82nd-minute goal from a corner, as Sunderland won 2–1.

On 7 May 2016, Khazri scored a volley in a 3–2 win over Chelsea as manager Sam Allardyce's team neared survival in the Premier League. Richard Mennear of the Sunderland Echo wrote that "His work rate was immense, pressing and probing the Chelsea defence and causing problems from set pieces. He has regained his form just at the right time".

On 31 August 2017, Khazri returned to Ligue 1, signing a season-long loan at Rennes. He was sent off on 14 October in a 2–0 Derby Breton loss at Guingamp, earning two yellow cards for dissent within ten seconds. His nine goals helped the club to 5th place and qualification to the Europa League.

=== Saint-Étienne ===
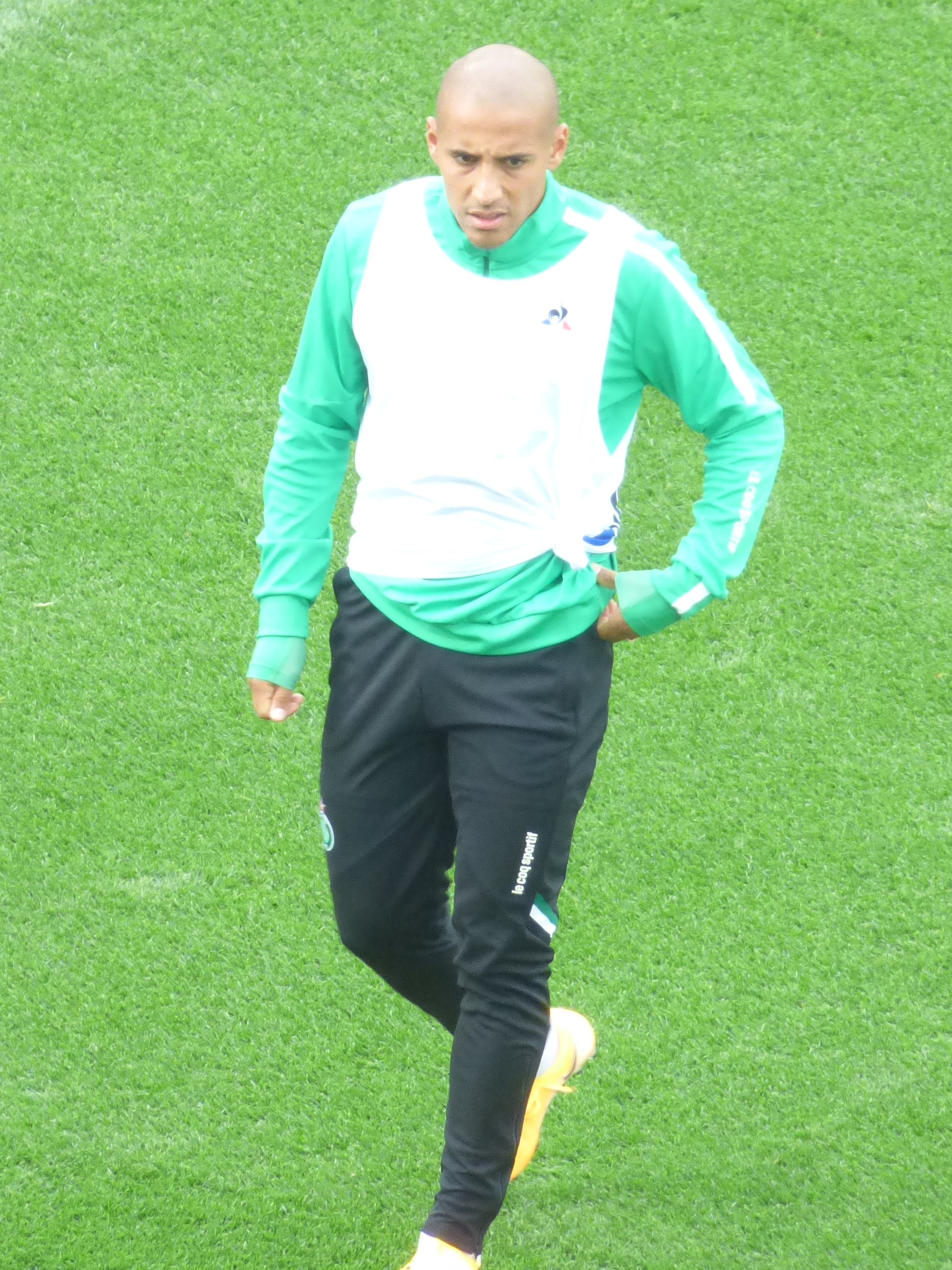
Khazri with Saint-Étienne in 2020

On 17 July 2018, Khazri transferred to Saint-Étienne for four years and chose to wear number 10. He played his first match with the “Greens” on the first day of Ligue 1, 11 August against Guingamp at the Stade Geoffroy-Guichard, and it was on that day that he also scored his first goal in his new colors. He opened the scoring by performing a volley after a cross from the left of Loïs Diony. ASSE wins 2–1 in this game. On 28 September, on behalf of the eighth day of Ligue 1, he achieved a performance at home against Monaco, scoring the only two goals of the match, thus achieving his first double with Saint-Étienne. On 12 January 2019, while ASSE traveled to the Stade de Roudourou to once again face Guingamp, Wahbi Khazri scored the only goal of the match on a direct free kick at ground level, deceiving the opposing goalkeeper Marc-Aurèle Caillard. This achievement allows him to bring his total of goals to ten units, a score he had never achieved before in a single season in the league. His second half of the season was less brilliant but he still ended the 2018–19 season with thirteen goals scored, making him the top scorer for his team in this exercise.

Khazri had a difficult start to the 2019–20 season. If he is decisive passer for Romain Hamouma during the victory in Dijon 1–2, it is not until the eleventh day, 27 October against Amiens, to see him score his first goal of the season, not sufficient however to obtain the victory 2–2. Khazri, who then gets injured with his selection in November, is out for several weeks. Due to the state of the club's finances, he was placed on the unwanted list by Claude Puel during the 2020–21 season. However, despite contacts at Turkish runner-up Trabzonspor, the club failed to sell him. He is therefore reinstated in the group with a first match against Lens, where he takes a red card after a late tackle. He scored his first goal of the season from the penalty spot against Lille 1–1 on 29 November. His playing time is reduced compared to previous seasons, but through perseverance he manages to regain his starting position and even scores the first hat-trick of his career in the victory 4–1 against Bordeaux on 11 April 2021. This match also allows him to reach the symbolic bar of 200 matches in Ligue 1.

During the 2021–22 season, on 30 October, during a trip to face Metz, he scored his seventh goal of the season in Ligue 1 with a shot from 68 meters, the furthest goal in Ligue 1 since 2006, the first year in which the distances of shots were measured. After the eviction of Claude Puel as manager, interim coach Julien Sablé entrusted the captain's armband to Khazri. He continued his role as captain under new coach Pascal Dupraz.

=== Montpellier ===
On 27 June 2022, Khazri signed for Ligue 1 side Montpellier. He chose the number 99 jersey at the club, becoming the first player to wear the number for Montpellier. On 13 August 2022, he scored his first goal for the club in 5–2 away loss to Paris Saint-Germain.

=== Retirement ===
On 12 December 2025, Khazri announced his retirement from professional football.

== International career ==
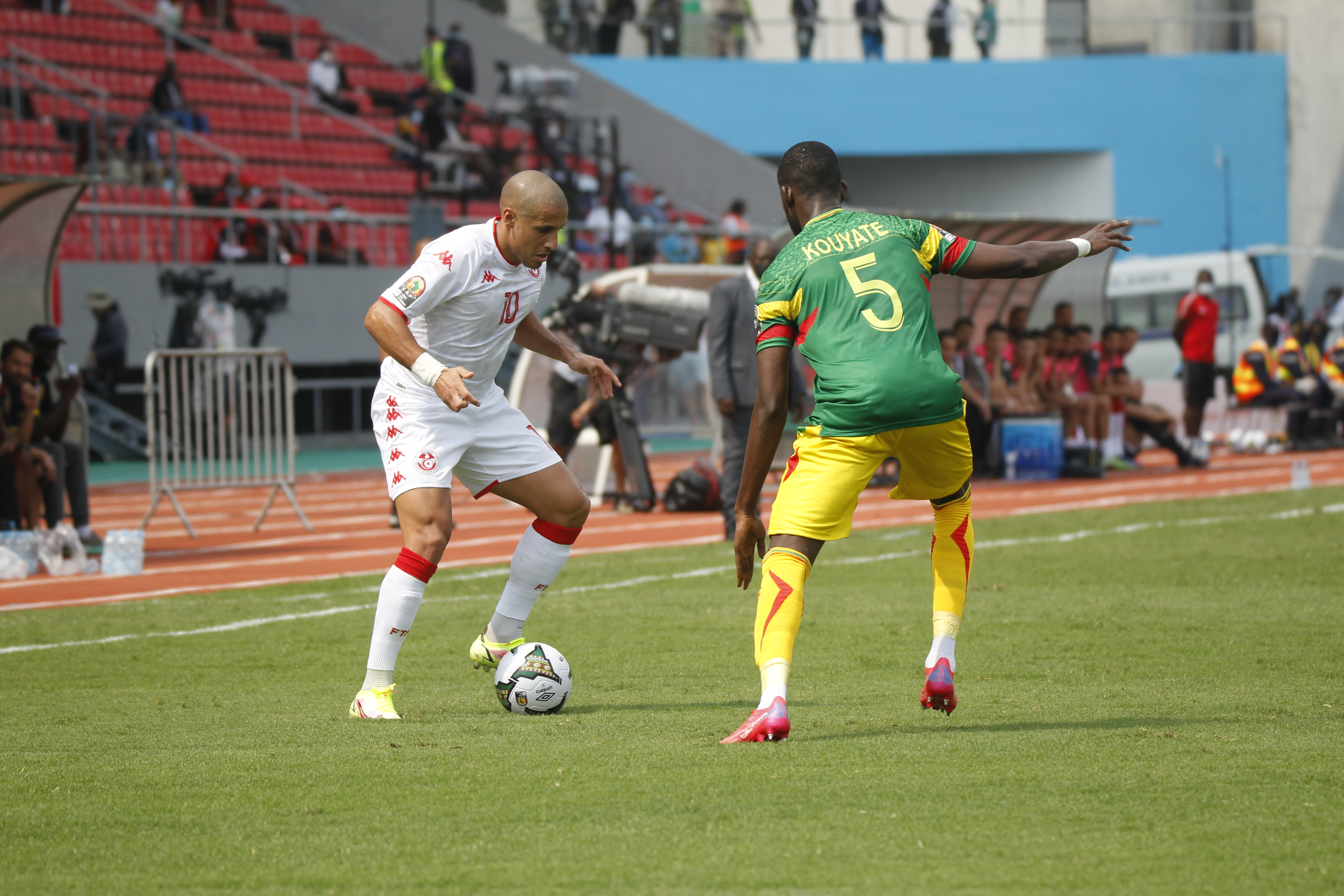
Khazri playing with Tunisia against Mali at the 2021 Africa Cup of Nations

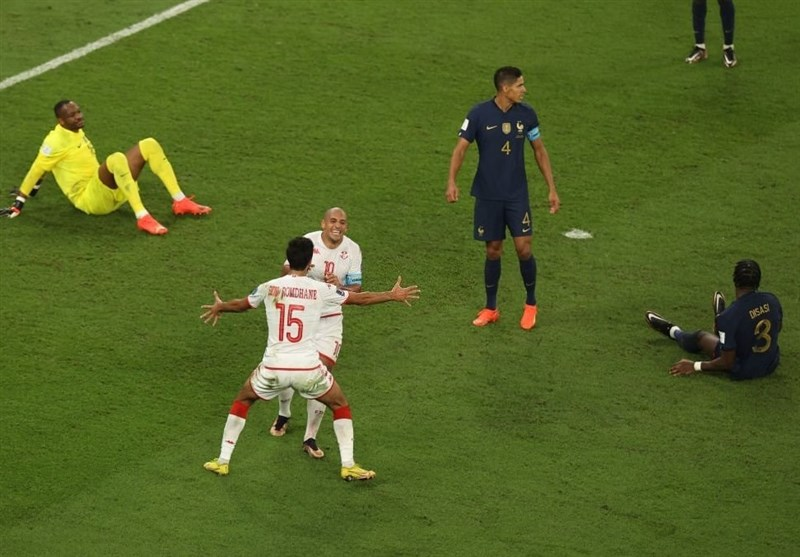
Khazri celebrates his goal against France at the 2022 FIFA World Cup.

In 2009, Khazri made his debut for the Tunisia national under-20 football team. However, in November 2011, he was called up by Erick Mombaerts to the France national under-21 football team for a pair of 2013 UEFA European Under-21 Football Championship qualifiers against Romania and Slovakia. In February 2012, he played his first and only game for the French side, against Italy, before being substituted by Frédéric Bulot. In late 2012, Khazri switched his international allegiance once again, when he accepted a call-up from Sami Trabelsi, the Tunisian national team's coach, including him in the squad for the 2013 African Cup of Nations.

Henryk Kasperczak named Khazri among 23 Tunisians to compete at the 2017 Africa Cup of Nations in Gabon. In the final group game, a 4–2 win over Zimbabwe at the Stade d'Angondjé, he assisted Naïm Sliti and scored a penalty in a 4–2 win that put the Carthage Eagles through at the expense of a favoured Algeria side. Manager Nabil Maâloul called up Khazri for Tunisia's squad at the 2018 FIFA World Cup in Russia. In the second group match, he assisted Dylan Bronn and scored himself in added time in a 5–2 loss to Belgium in Moscow. With both teams already eliminated, he then played his part in a 2–1 comeback win over Panama that was Tunisia's first at the World Cup since 1978; he set up Fakhreddine Ben Youssef and then scored the winning goal, the 2,500th in the competition's history.

Khazri was the captain of the Tunisian side that came fourth at the 2019 Africa Cup of Nations in Egypt. In their second group game, he equalised to earn a 1–1 draw with Mali in Port Suez. In the third match of the 2022 FIFA World Cup qualification against Mauritania, on 7 October 2021, he scored his 22nd goal in the colors of Tunisia, thus becoming the second top scorer in the selection behind Issam Jemâa (36 goals). On the second day of the group stage of the 2021 Africa Cup of Nations, Khazri scored his first double of the competition against Mauritania, in a match where the Eagles of Carthage won 4–0. In November 2022, Khazri was called up to the Tunisia squad by Jalel Kadri for the 2022 FIFA World Cup in Qatar. On 30 November, he scored the winning goal in a 1–0 victory over France in the last match of group stage, yet Tunisia were eliminated as they finished third in their group due to an Australian victory over Denmark. He announced his international retirement on the following day of the last World Cup match.

== Career statistics ==
=== Club ===
As of match played 10 May 2025

Appearances and goals by club, season and competition
Club	Season	League			National cup		League cup		Continental		Other		Total	
Club	Season	Division	Apps	Goals	Apps	Goals	Apps	Goals	Apps	Goals	Apps	Goals	Apps	Goals
Bastia	2008–09	Ligue 2	12	3	0	0	0	0	—		—		12	3
Bastia	2009–10	Ligue 2	31	2	0	0	1	0	—		—		32	2
Bastia	2010–11	Championnat National	34	4	0	0	4	1	—		—		38	5
Bastia	2011–12	Ligue 2	33	9	2	1	0	0	—		—		35	10
Bastia	2012–13	Ligue 1	29	7	0	0	3	0	—		—		32	7
Bastia	2013–14	Ligue 1	32	6	1	1	1	0	—		—		34	7
Bastia	Total		171	31	3	2	9	1	—		—		183	34
Bordeaux	2014–15	Ligue 1	32	9	1	0	1	0	—		—		34	9
Bordeaux	2015–16	Ligue 1	20	5	1	0	1	0	8 (Note: Appearances in UEFA Europa League)	1	—		30	6
Bordeaux	Total		52	14	2	0	2	0	8	1	—		64	15
Sunderland	2015–16	Premier League	14	2	0	0	0	0	—		—		14	2
Sunderland	2016–17	Premier League	21	1	0	0	2	0	—		—		23	1
Sunderland	2017–18	Championship	3	0	0	0	2	0	—		—		5	0
Sunderland	Total		38	3	0	0	4	0	—		—		42	3
Rennes (loan)	2017–18	Ligue 1	24	9	1	0	4	2	—		—		29	11
Saint-Étienne	2018–19	Ligue 1	32	13	2	1	1	0	—		—		35	14
Saint-Étienne	2019–20	Ligue 1	16	3	3	1	1	0	3	2	—		23	6
Saint-Étienne	2020–21	Ligue 1	22	7	1	0	—		—		—		23	7
Saint-Étienne	2021–22	Ligue 1	30	10	1	0	—		—		2 (Note: Appearances in Ligue 1 relegation play-offs)	0	33	10
Saint-Étienne	Total		100	33	7	2	2	0	3	2	2	0	114	37
Montpellier	2022–23	Ligue 1	27	4	1	0	—		—		—		28	4
Montpellier	2023–24	Ligue 1	25	1	3	0	—		—		—		28	1
Montpellier	2024–25	Ligue 1	30	1	1	0	—		—		—		31	1
Montpellier	Total		82	6	5	0	—		—		—		87	6
Career total			467	96	18	4	21	3	11	3	2	0	519	105

=== International ===
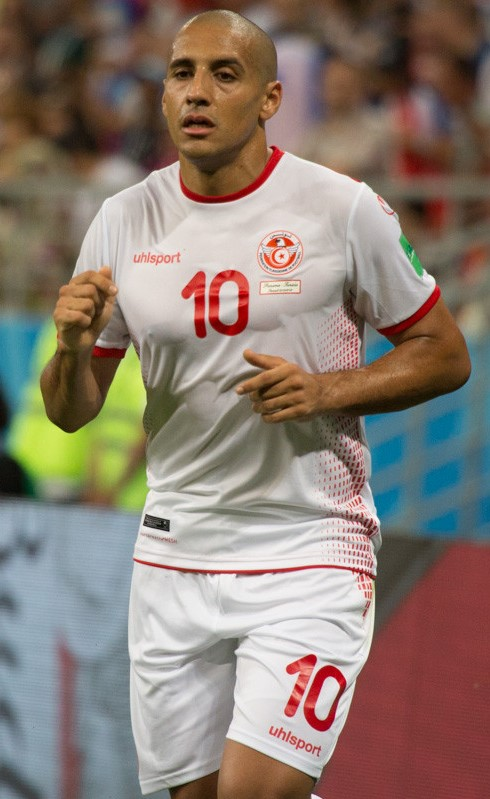
Khazri playing with Tunisia against Panama at the 2018 FIFA World Cup

Appearances and goals by national team and year
National team	Year	Apps	Goals
Tunisia	2013	7	2
Tunisia	2014	6	3
Tunisia	2015	9	3
Tunisia	2016	5	2
Tunisia	2017	7	1
Tunisia	2018	8	3
Tunisia	2019	11	5
Tunisia	2020	4	0
Tunisia	2021	8	3
Tunisia	2022	9	3
Total		74	25

Scores and results list Tunisia's goal tally first, score column indicates score after each Khazri goal.

List of international goals scored by Wahbi Khazri
No.	Date	Venue	Opponent	Score	Result	Competition
1	23 March 2013	Stade Olympique de Radès, Tunis, Tunisia	Sierra Leone	2–0	2–1	2014 FIFA World Cup qualification
2	14 August 2013	Stade Olympique de Radès, Tunis, Tunisia	Congo	1–0	3–0	Friendly
3	5 March 2014	RCDE Stadium, Barcelona, Spain	Colombia	1–1	1–1	Friendly
4	6 September 2014	Stade Mustapha Ben Jannet, Monastir, Tunisia	Botswana	1–1	2–1	2015 Africa Cup of Nations qualification
5	19 November 2014	Stade Mustapha Ben Jannet, Monastir, Tunisia	Egypt	2–1	2–1	2015 Africa Cup of Nations qualification
6	11 January 2015	Stade Olympique de Radès, Tunis, Tunisia	Algeria	1–1	1–1	Friendly
7	9 October 2015	Stade Olympique de Radès, Tunis, Tunisia	Gabon	3–1	3–3	Friendly
8	13 November 2015	Stade Olympique, Nouakchott, Mauritania	Mauritania	1–1	2–1	2018 FIFA World Cup qualification
9	4 September 2016	Stade Mustapha Ben Jannet, Monastir, Tunisia	Liberia	1–0	4–1	2017 Africa Cup of Nations qualification
10	11 November 2016	Omar Hamadi Stadium, Algiers, Algeria	Libya	1–0	1–0	2018 FIFA World Cup qualification
11	23 January 2017	Stade d'Angondjé, Libreville, Gabon	Zimbabwe	4–1	4–2	2017 Africa Cup of Nations
12	27 March 2018	Allianz Riviera, Nice, France	Costa Rica	1–0	1–0	Friendly
13	23 June 2018	Otkritie Arena, Moscow, Russia	Belgium	2–5	2–5	2018 FIFA World Cup
14	28 June 2018	Mordovia Arena, Saransk, Russia	Panama	2–1	2–1	2018 FIFA World Cup
15	7 June 2019	Stade Olympique de Radès, Tunis, Tunisia	Iraq	1–0	2–0	Friendly
16	28 June 2019	Suez Stadium, Suez, Egypt	Mali	1–1	1–1	2019 Africa Cup of Nations
17	15 November 2019	Stade Olympique de Radès, Tunis, Tunisia	Libya	1–0	4–1	2021 Africa Cup of Nations qualification
18	15 November 2019	Stade Olympique de Radès, Tunis, Tunisia	Libya	4–1	4–1	2021 Africa Cup of Nations qualification
19	19 November 2019	Estadio de Malabo, Malabo, Equatorial Guinea	Equatorial Guinea	1–0	1–0	2021 Africa Cup of Nations qualification
20	3 September 2021	Stade Hammadi Agrebi, Tunis, Tunisia	Equatorial Guinea	3–0	3–0	2022 FIFA World Cup qualification
21	7 September 2021	Levy Mwanawasa Stadium, Ndola, Zambia	Zambia	1–0	2–0	2022 FIFA World Cup qualification
22	7 October 2021	Stade Hammadi Agrebi, Tunis, Tunisia	Mauritania	2–0	3–0	2022 FIFA World Cup qualification
23	16 January 2022	Limbe Stadium, Limbe, Cameroon	Mauritania	2–0	4–0	2021 Africa Cup of Nations
24	16 January 2022	Limbe Stadium, Limbe, Cameroon	Mauritania	3–0	4–0	2021 Africa Cup of Nations
25	30 November 2022	Education City Stadium, Al Rayyan, Qatar	France	1–0	1–0	2022 FIFA World Cup

== Honours ==
Bastia

- Ligue 2: 2011–12
- Championnat National: 2010–11

Saint-Étienne

- Coupe de France runner-up: 2019–20

Individual

- UNFP Ligue 2 Team of the Year: 2011–12
- UNFP Ligue 1 Player of the Month: November 2018
- Tunisian Footballer of the Year: 2018
