= Féthi Harek =

Algerian footballer (born 1982)

Personal information
- Date of birth: 21 October 1982 (age 44)
- Place of birth: Oullins, France
- Height: 1.75 m (5 ft 9 in)
- Position: Defender

Senior career*
| Years | Team | Apps | (Gls) |
| 2000–2003 | Saint-Priest | 51 | (7) |
| 2003–2005 | Île-Rousse | 65 | (9) |
| 2005–2007 | Rodez AF | 52 | (3) |
| 2007–2014 | Bastia | 220 | (4) |
| 2014–2019 | Nîmes | 116 | (2) |
| Total | | 504 | (25) |

International career
| 2008 | Algeria | 1 | (0) |
- * Club domestic league appearances and goals

Féthi Harek (Arabic: فتحي حارك; born 21 October 1982) is a former professional footballer who played as a defender. Having begun his career with lower league sides Saint-Priest, FAIRM Île-Rousse Monticello, and Rodez AF, he spent the majority of his career with Bastia and Nîmes. Born in France, at international level he was capped once for the Algeria national team.

== Club career ==
Harek was born in Oullins, France, to a family originally from Tlemcen, Algeria.

He started his playing career as a striker for various amateur sides such as Saint-Priest, FAIRM Île-Rousse Monticello and Rodez AF. In the 2006–07 season, he helped Rodez win promotion to the third-tier Championnat National. His performances did not go unnoticed, and Bastia signed him at the end of that season.

In July 2014, after seven years in Bastia playing in Ligue 1, Ligue 2 and National, Harek signed a three-year contract with Nîmes.

== International career ==
Harek received his first call-up to the Algeria national team for a friendly against DR Congo on 26 March 2008 in Paris, France. He made his debut at halftime, replacing Salim Arrache on the left wing.

== Career statistics ==
=== Club ===
Appearances and goals by club, season and competition
| Team | Season | League (Note: Includes Ligue 1, Ligue 2 and Championnat National.) | | | Cup (Note: Includes Coupe de France, Coupe de la Ligue and Trophée des champions.) | | Europe (Note: Includes UEFA Champions League, UEFA Cup and UEFA Supercup.) | | Total | |
| Team | Season | Division | Apps | Goals | Apps | Goals | Apps | Goals | Apps | Goals |
|---|---|---|---|---|---|---|---|---|---|---|
| Bastia | 2007–08 | Ligue 2 | 37 | 1 | 5 | 0 | — | | 42 | 1 |
| Bastia | 2008–09 | Ligue 2 | 28 | 0 | 3 | 0 | — | | 31 | 0 |
| Bastia | 2009–10 | Ligue 2 | 29 | 1 | 2 | 0 | — | | 31 | 1 |
| Bastia | 2010–11 | Championnat National | 33 | 0 | 5 | 0 | — | | 38 | 0 |
| Bastia | 2011–12 | Ligue 2 | 36 | 2 | 4 | 0 | — | | 40 | 2 |
| Bastia | 2012–13 | Ligue 1 | 33 | 0 | 3 | 0 | — | | 36 | 0 |
| Bastia | 2013–14 | Ligue 1 | 24 | 0 | 4 | 0 | — | | 28 | 0 |
| Bastia | Total | | 220 | 4 | 26 | 0 | 0 | 0 | 246 | 4 |
| Nîmes | 2014–15 | Ligue 2 | 31 | 0 | 2 | 0 | — | | 33 | 0 |
| Nîmes | 2015–16 | Ligue 2 | 27 | 0 | 0 | 0 | — | | 27 | 0 |
| Nîmes | 2016–17 | Ligue 2 | 26 | 0 | 0 | 0 | — | | 26 | 0 |
| Nîmes | 2017–18 | Ligue 2 | 29 | 2 | 2 | 0 | — | | 31 | 2 |
| Nîmes | 2018–19 | Ligue 1 | 3 | 0 | 2 | 0 | — | | 5 | 0 |
| Nîmes | Total | | 116 | 2 | 6 | 0 | 0 | 0 | 122 | 2 |
| Career total | | | 336 | 6 | 32 | 0 | 0 | 0 | 368 | 6 |

== Honours ==
Bastia

- Championnat National: 2010–11
- Ligue 2: 2011–12
- Ligue 2 Team of the Year: 2011–12
