= Maka Mary =

French professional footballer (born 1989)

Personal information
- Full name: Maka Mary
- Date of birth: March 27, 1989 (age 37)
- Place of birth: Le Havre, France
- Height: 1.82 m (6 ft 0 in)
- Position: Defender

Youth career
- 2006–2009: Le Havre

Senior career*
Years	Team	Apps	(Gls)
2009–2010	Le Havre	4	(0)
2010–2014	Bastia	52	(0)
2016	Sainte-Geneviève	13	(1)
2016–2017	Paris FC	12	(0)
2017–2019	Bastia	10	(1)
- * Club domestic league appearances and goals as of 13:38, 22 September 2019 (UTC)

Maka Mary (born 27 March 1989) is a French former professional footballer who plays as a defender.

== Career ==
Maka Mary was born in Le Havre, France. He holds French and Malian nationalities.

Mary made his professional debut for Le Havre AC on 3 May 2009 in a Ligue 1 game against FC Nantes being introduced into the match in the 55th minute in place of Kana-Biyik.

He played for Bastia from 2010 to 2014.

On 2 August 2016, he signed for Paris FC.

In August 2017, Mary was one of four new signings announced by SC Bastia, which had played in Ligue 1 in the 2016–17 season but dropped to the fifth-tier Championnat National 3 after filing bankruptcy.

== Club statistics ==
=== Club ===
As of 20 August 2016

Appearances and goals by club, season and competition
Team	Season	League (Note: Includes Ligue 1, Ligue 2 and Championnat National.)			Cup (Note: Includes Coupe de France, Coupe de la Ligue and Trophée des champions.)		Europe (Note: Includes UEFA Champions League, UEFA Cup and UEFA Supercup)		Total	
Team	Season	Division	Apps	Goals	Apps	Goals	Apps	Goals	Apps	Goals
Le Havre	2008–09	Ligue 1	4	0	0	0	—		4	0
Le Havre	2009–10	Ligue 2	0	0	0	0	—		0	0
Le Havre	Total		4	0	0	0	0	0	4	0
Bastia	2010–11	Championnat National	22	0	4	0	—		26	0
Bastia	2011–12	Ligue 2	23	0	5	0	—		28	0
Bastia	2012–13	Ligue 1	7	0	2	0	—		9	0
Bastia	Total		52	0	13	0	0	0	65	0
Career total			56	0	13	0	0	0	69	0
