= Adrien Faviana =

French professional football player (born 1986)

Personal information
- Full name: Adrien Faviana
- Date of birth: 21 July 1986 (age 40)
- Place of birth: Nice, France
- Height: 1.80 m (5 ft 11 in)
- Position: Defender

Team information
- Current team: Rodez AF
- Number: 5

Senior career*
Years	Team	Apps	(Gls)
2004–2008	Nice Réserve	14	(0)
2008–2009	Nice	1	(0)
2009–2016	Rodez AF	139	(3)
- * Club domestic league appearances and goals as of 20:26, 15 June 2010 (UTC)

Adrien Faviana (born 21 July 1986) is a French professional football player, who currently plays in the Championnat National for Rodez AF.

== Career ==
He played on the professional level in Ligue 1 for OGC Nice and Rodez AF.
