= Yassin El-Azzouzi =

French-Moroccan footballer (born 1983)

Personal information
- Date of birth: 13 January 1983 (age 43)
- Place of birth: Lunel, France
- Height: 1.80 m (5 ft 11 in)
- Position: Striker

Senior career*
Years	Team	Apps	(Gls)
2000–2002	Montpellier B		
2002–2003	PCAC Sète		
2003–2004	ÉF Bastia		
2004–2005	Gallia Club Lunel		
2005–2007	Nîmes	13	(0)
2007–2008	RCO Agde		
2008–2009	Montceau Bourgogne	31	(19)
2009–2010	Pacy Vallée-d'Eure	36	(23)
2010–2012	Bastia	32	(13)
2011–2012	Bastia II	3	(0)
- * Club domestic league appearances and goals

Yassin El-Azzouzi (born 13 January 1983) is a French-Moroccan former professional footballer who played as a striker.

== Career ==
El-Azzouzi scored 8 goals in 17 Ligue 2 matches for SC Bastia in the 2010–11 campaign.

After making few appearances in the first half of the 2012–13 season under coach Frédéric Hantz at Bastia, he was linked with Chamois Niortais with media reporting him having passed medical examination at the club. However, Niort failed to agree terms over a contract with El-Azzouzi. He decided to end his career at the age of 30 in summer 2013.
