= Matar Fall =

French footballer (born 1982)

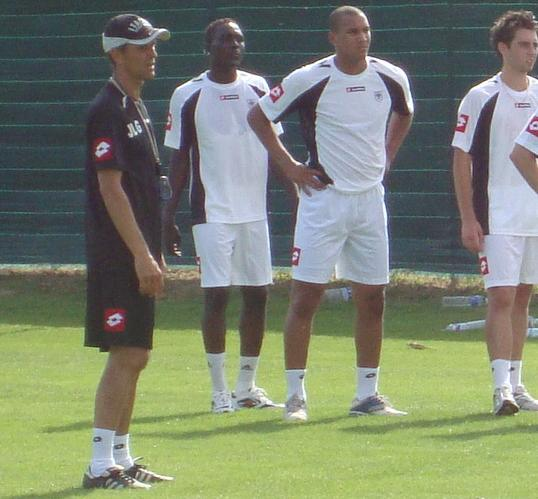

Personal information
- Date of birth: March 18, 1982 (age 44)
- Place of birth: Toulon, France
- Height: 1.84 m (6 ft 1/2 in)
- Position: Midfielder

Team information
- Current team: Toulon

Youth career
- 1999–2000: Montpellier

Senior career*
Years	Team	Apps	(Gls)
2000–2007	Toulon	120	(3)
2007–2013	Angers	169	(4)
2013–2014	Fréjus Saint-Raphaël	28	(0)
2014–2015	Gazélec Ajaccio	13	(0)
2015–	Toulon	0	(0)

International career
2009	Senegal	2	(0)
- * Club domestic league appearances and goals as of 7 May 2015

Matar Fall (born March 18, 1982), also known as Martin Fall, is a French professional football player currently playing in CFA 2 for Sporting Toulon Var.

His real name is Matar, but it was distorted by journalists and fans as Martin for so long that he is known as "the man with two first names."
