= Jonathan Lacourt =

French footballer (born 1986)

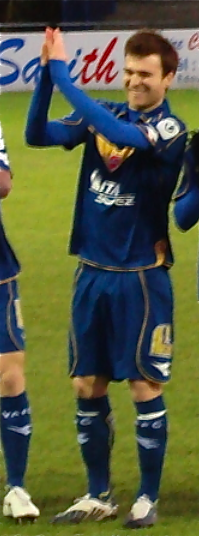
- Lacourt with Valenciennes in 2009

Personal information
- Date of birth: 17 August 1986 (age 40)
- Place of birth: Avignon, France
- Height: 1.80 m (5 ft 11 in)
- Position: Midfielder

Senior career*
Years	Team	Apps	(Gls)
2005–2008	Lens	29	(0)
2007	→ Troyes (loan)	16	(0)
2008–2011	Valenciennes	20	(2)
2012	Châteauroux	3	(0)
2012–2013	Amiens	29	(6)
2013–2014	Albi	18	(9)
2014–2016	Nîmes	26	(2)
2016–2017	Albi		
2018–2021	FC Marssac		
- * Club domestic league appearances and goals

Jonathan Lacourt (French pronunciation: [ʒɔnatɑ̃ lakuʁ]; born 17 August 1986) is a French former professional footballer who played as a midfielder. He is a former French youth international.

== Career ==
In 2009, Lacourt was a victim of a challenge from Senegalese midfielder Kader Mangane in a Ligue 1 match which led to a broken leg. The injury kept him out for over two years.

After a successful trial with Bastia in January 2012, Lacourt was not allowed to sign with the Corsican side due to financial sanctions. He then went on to play in Ligue 2 for Châteauroux, before joining Amiens.

Lacourt signed with lower-league side FC Marssac in 2018 where he stayed for three seasons, notably contributing to the club's first promotion to the sixth tier Régional 1 in the 2018–19 season and reaching the last 16 of the Coupe de France.

== Honours ==
Lens

- UEFA Intertoto Cup: 2005
