= Ismaël Gace =

French footballer (born 1986)

Personal information
- Date of birth: 19 September 1986 (age 40)
- Place of birth: Saint-Germain-en-Laye, France
- Height: 1.82 m (6 ft 0 in)
- Position: Left back

Team information
- Current team: Haguenau
- Number: 4

Youth career
- –2002: Paris Saint-Germain
- 2002–2006: Nice (loan)

Senior career*
Years	Team	Apps	(Gls)
2006–2011	Nice	45	(2)
2009	→ Rodez AF (loan)	20	(0)
2011–2013	Boulogne	61	(0)
2014–2015	Fréjus-Saint-Raphaël	22	(1)
2015–2017	Les Herbiers	61	(0)
2017–2018	US Granville	24	(2)
2018–2023	SAS Épinal	90	(2)
2023–	Haguenau	8	(1)
- * Club domestic league appearances and goals as of 18 November 2023

Ismaël Gace (born 19 September 1986) is a French football defender who plays for Haguenau.

== Career ==
Gace began his career at French Ligue 1 capital club Paris Saint-Germain as part of their youth set-up. In 2002, he moved to Côte d'Azur based club OGC Nice, where he was contracted until 2012. On 16 January 2009, he joined Rodez AF on loan. On 28 July 2011, he joined the Ligue 2 side US Boulogne.
