= Patrick N'Tolla =

Cameroonian footballer

Personal information
- Full name: Patrick Franck N'Tolla
- Date of birth: 30 July 1987 (age 39)
- Place of birth: Douala, Cameroon
- Height: 1.74 m (5 ft 9 in)
- Position: Defender

Senior career*
| Years | Team | Apps | (Gls) |
| 2004–2008 | Nancy B | 43 | (3) |
| 2005–2006 | Nancy | 1 | (0) |
| 2008–2009 | Louhans-Cuiseaux | 29 | (2) |
| 2009–2010 | Dijon | 4 | (0) |
| 2010–2011 | Évian | 1 | (0) |
| 2010–2011 | → Rodez (loan) | 18 | (0) |
| 2011–2013 | Le Mont | | |
| 2013–2014 | Ivry | 26 | (0) |
| 2014–2015 | Drancy | 17 | (1) |
| 2015–2016 | Bobigny | | |
- * Club domestic league appearances and goals as of 22:18, 1 March 2019 (UTC)

Patrick Franck N'Tolla (born 30 July 1987) is a Cameroonian professional footballer who plays as a defender.
