= Jérémie Clément =

French footballer (born 1984)

Personal information
- Date of birth: 8 October 1984 (age 42)
- Place of birth: Carpentras, France
- Height: 1.81 m (5 ft 11 in)
- Position: Centre-back

Team information
- Current team: Béziers
- Number: 5

Senior career*
| Years | Team | Apps | (Gls) |
| 2004–2006 | Nîmes | | |
| 2006–2009 | Arles-Avignon | | |
| 2009–2011 | Paris FC | 53 | (4) |
| 2011–2012 | Red Star | 23 | (1) |
| 2012–2014 | Cannes | 53 | (5) |
| 2014–2015 | Le Pontet | 16 | (0) |
| 2015–2020 | Le Puy | 69 | (0) |
| 2019–2020 | Le Puy B | 9 | (0) |
| 2020– | Béziers | 27 | (4) |
- * Club domestic league appearances and goals as of 00:03, 12 May 2022 (UTC)

Jérémie Clément (born 8 October 1984) is a French professional footballer who plays as a centre-back for Championnat National 1 club Béziers.
