= Salim Moizini =

French-born Comorian footballer (born 1985)

Personal information
- Date of birth: 17 October 1985 (age 41)
- Place of birth: Marseille, France
- Height: 1.75 m (5 ft 9 in)
- Position: Midfielder

Youth career
- 2001–2003: Vénissieux
- 2003–2005: Marseille

Senior career*
Years	Team	Apps	(Gls)
2005–2006	Vénissieux		
2007–2008	Saint-Priest	28	(5)
2008–2013	Bastia	62	(5)
2013	Paris FC	18	(2)
2013–2014	CA Bastia	26	(1)
2015–2020	Lyon-Duchère	119	(2)

International career
2019	Comoros	1	(0)
- * Club domestic league appearances and goals

Salim Moizini (born 17 October 1985) is a former professional footballer who played as a midfielder. Born in France, he made one appearance for the Comoros national team.

He joined Lyon La-Duchère in November 2015. He previously played for CA Bastia in Ligue 2.
