= Johann Paul =

Footballer (born 1981)

Personal information
- Date of birth: 5 May 1981 (age 45)
- Place of birth: Issoudun, France
- Height: 1.80 m (5 ft 11 in)
- Position: Midfielder

Senior career*
Years	Team	Apps	(Gls)
1998–2004	Châteauroux	73	(2)
2005–2007	Châtellerault	54	(1)
2007–2008	Pau FC	31	(0)
2008–2010	Créteil	63	(1)
2010–2014	Amiens	58	(0)
2015–2016	Fréjus Saint-Raphaël	19	(0)
2016–2018	Créteil	33	(0)
2019–2022	Vierzon	21	(1)
Total		352	(5)

International career
2003–2016	Madagascar	25	(1)
- * Club domestic league appearances and goals

Johann Paul (born 5 May 1981) is a former professional footballer who plays as a midfielder. Born in France, he represented Madagascar at international level.

In 2006, during a match between his club Châtellerault and Angers, Paul nearly died on the pitch after suffering a heart attack.

== Career statistics ==
Scores and results list Madagascar's goal tally first.

No	Date	Venue	Opponent	Score	Result	Competition
1.	10 October 2015	Mahamasina Municipal Stadium, Antananarivo, Madagascar	Central African Republic	3–0	3–0	2018 FIFA World Cup qualification
