= Jacques-Désiré Périatambée =

Mauritian footballer (born 1975)

Personal information
- Date of birth: 15 October 1975 (age 51)
- Place of birth: Curepipe, Mauritius
- Height: 1.81 m (5 ft 11 in)
- Position: Midfielder

Senior career*
Years	Team	Apps	(Gls)
1992–2000	Auxerre B	84	(3)
1997–1999	→ Troyes (loan)	25	(0)
2000–2003	Grenoble	104	(3)
2003–2006	Le Mans	60	(2)
2006–2008	Chamois Niortais	65	(1)
2008–2010	Dijon	30	(0)
2010–2012	Bastia	66	(0)
Total		434	(9)

International career
1999–2006	Mauritius	19	(2)
- * Club domestic league appearances and goals

Jacques-Désiré Périatambée (born 15 October 1975) is a Mauritian former professional footballer who played as a midfielder. He represented Mauritius internationally with the Mauritius national team.

His previous clubs include Auxerre, Troyes, Grenoble, Le Mans, Chamois Niortais, Dijon, Bastia all in the French football league system.

With Bastia Periatambee won the French third-tier in the 2010–11 season and the Ligue 2 in the 2011–12 season.

He retired in 2012, at the age of 37.
