= Thomas Mienniel =

French footballer (born 1980)

Personal information
- Full name: Thomas Mienniel
- Date of birth: November 24, 1980 (age 45)
- Place of birth: Amiens, France
- Height: 1.90 m (6 ft 3 in)
- Position: Centre-back

Senior career*
Years	Team	Apps	(Gls)
1999–2001	Amiens	8	(0)
2001–2004	Tours		
2004–2007	Laval	98	(5)
2007–2009	Clermont	52	(3)
2009–2011	Angers	31	(1)
2011–2013	Amiens	96	(5)
2013–2014	Boulogne	30	(2)
- * Club domestic league appearances and goals

Thomas Mienniel (born November 24, 1980) is a retired French professional footballer who played as a centre-back.
