= Jean-Charles Cirilli =

French footballer (born 1982)

Personal information
- Date of birth: September 10, 1982 (age 44)
- Place of birth: Saint-Étienne, France
- Height: 1.82 m (5 ft 11 1/2 in)
- Position: Defender

Senior career*
Years	Team	Apps	(Gls)
1999–2000	Saint-Étienne (B team)		
2000–2001	Le Puy		
2001–2003	Nice	9	(0)
2003–2004	Nîmes Olympique	3	(0)
2004–2006	AS Cannes	20	(0)
2006–2010	AC Arles-Avignon	91	(1)
2010–2013	Amiens SC	70	(0)
2013–2015	Fréjus Saint-Raphaël	48	(0)
- * Club domestic league appearances and goals

Jean-Charles Cirilli (born September 10, 1982) is a French former professional football player.
