= Magno Novaes =

Brazilian footballer

Personal information
- Full name: Magno Macedo Novaes
- Date of birth: 30 March 1983 (age 43)
- Place of birth: São Paulo, Brazil
- Height: 1.84 m (6 ft 0 in)
- Position: Goalkeeper

Team information
- Current team: Béziers (goalkeeper coach)

Youth career
- 1998: São Paulo
- 1998–2000: Corinthians

Senior career*
Years	Team	Apps	(Gls)
2000–2004	Bahia		
2004	Murici		
2005	Democrata-GV		
2005–2007	Moulins	19	(0)
2007–2008	Arles	34	(0)
2008–2013	Bastia	147	(0)
2013–2015	Valenciennes	14	(0)
2013–2014	Valenciennes B	4	(0)
2015	→ Amiens (loan)	18	(0)
2015–2020	Béziers	97	(0)
2019–2020	Béziers B	9	(0)

Managerial career
- 2020–: Béziers (goalkeeper coach)
- 2021: Béziers (interim manager)
- * Club domestic league appearances and goals

Magno Macedo Novaes (born 30 March 1983) is a Brazilian former professional footballer who played as a goalkeeper.

== Playing career ==
Born in São Paulo, Novaes arrived in France in 2005, where he played in the third-tier Championnat National for Moulins and Arles. In 2008, he joined Bastia of Ligue 2.

Novaes played all but two games as the Corsicans won the third division in 2010–11. A year later, they won promotion to Ligue 1 as champions and he was named Goalkeeper of the Year at the Trophées UNFP du football. However, veteran Frenchman Mickaël Landreau was preferred for the 2012–13 Ligue 1 season, and at its conclusion the Brazilian signed a two-year deal at Valenciennes also in the top flight.

At Valenciennes, Novaes was not first choice, including after relegation to Ligue 2, and also played occasionally for the reserve team in the fifth tier. In January 2015, he was loaned to third-tier Amiens for the rest of the season.

In October 2015, Novaes signed for Béziers for the rest of the Championnat National season. He played all but three games in 2017–18 as they won promotion as runners-up to Red Star, but in the ensuing Ligue 2 season he was absent with a knee injury from October to February, the first such absence of his career.

== Coaching career ==
After his retirement in the summer 2020, Novaes was hired as goalkeeper coach at Béziers. After manager Colbert Marlot was fired on 15 November 2021, Novaes was named caretaker manager. Novaes was in charge for three games (2 victories, 1 defeat), before he was replaced by Alain Nègre on 14 December 2021. Novaes then continued in his original position as goalkeeper coach.
