= Gilles Cioni =

French professional footballer (born 1984)

Personal information
- Date of birth: 14 June 1984 (age 42)
- Place of birth: Bastia, France
- Height: 1.65 m (5 ft 5 in)
- Position: Defender

Youth career
- 2002–2005: Bastia

Senior career*
Years	Team	Apps	(Gls)
2005–2007	Bastia	10	(0)
2007–2010	Paris	83	(0)
2010–2021	Bastia	195	(1)
2012–2015	Bastia B	8	(0)
Total		296	(1)

International career
2009–?	Corsica	7	(1)
- * Club domestic league appearances and goals

Gilles Cioni (born 14 June 1984) is a French professional footballer who played as a defender. He spent almost his entire career with hometown club Bastia which he also captained. At international level, he represented the Corsica national team.

== Career ==
In September 2017, Cioni agreed a contract extension with hometown club SC Bastia which had played in Ligue 1 in the 2016–17 season but dropped to the fifth-tier Championnat National 3 after filing bankruptcy.

Cioni announced his retirement from playing in June 2021.

== Career statistics ==
Appearances and goals by club, season and competition
Club	Season	League			Cup (Note: Appearances in Coupe de France, Coupe de la Ligue and Trophée des champions.)		Europe (Note: Appearances in UEFA Champions League, UEFA Cup and UEFA Supercup)		Total	
Club	Season	Division	Apps	Goals	Apps	Goals	Apps	Goals	Apps	Goals
Bastia	2005–06	Ligue 2	4	0	0	0	—		4	0
Bastia	2006–07	Ligue 2	6	0	0	0	—		6	0
Bastia	Total		10	0	0	0	0	0	10	0
Paris FC	2007–08	Championnat National	27	0	0	0	—		27	0
Paris FC	2008–09	Championnat National	23	0	0	0	—		23	0
Paris FC	2009–10	Championnat National	33	0	0	0	—		33	0
Paris FC	Total		83	0	0	0	0	0	83	0
Bastia	2010–11	Championnat National	35	1	4	0	—		39	1
Bastia	2011–12	Ligue 2	23	0	2	0	—		25	0
Bastia	2012–13	Ligue 1	28	0	2	0	—		30	0
Bastia	2013–14	Ligue 1	9	0	2	0	—		11	0
Bastia	2014–15	Ligue 1	14	0	4	0	—		11	0
Bastia	2015–16	Ligue 1	20	0	2	0	—		11	0
Bastia	2016–17	Ligue 1	25	0	0	0	—		11	0
Bastia	2017–18	Championnat National 3	15	0	0	0	—		15	0
Bastia	2018–19	Championnat National 3	14	0	5	0	—		19	0
Bastia	2019–20	Championnat National 2	8	0	0	0	—		8	0
Bastia	2020–21	Championnat National	4	0	0	0	—		4	0
Bastia	Total		195	1	21	0	0	0	216	1
Bastia B	2012–13	Championnat National 3	1	0	–		—		1	0
Bastia B	2013–14	Championnat National 3	1	0	–		—		1	0
Bastia B	2014–15	Championnat National 3	5	0	–		—		5	0
Bastia B	2015–16	Championnat National 3	1	0	–		—		1	0
Bastia B	Total		8	0	0	0	0	0	8	0
Career total			296	1	21	0	0	0	317	1

== Honours ==
Bastia

- Championnat National: 2010–11
- Ligue 2: 2011–12
