= Matthieu Sans =

French footballer (born 1988)

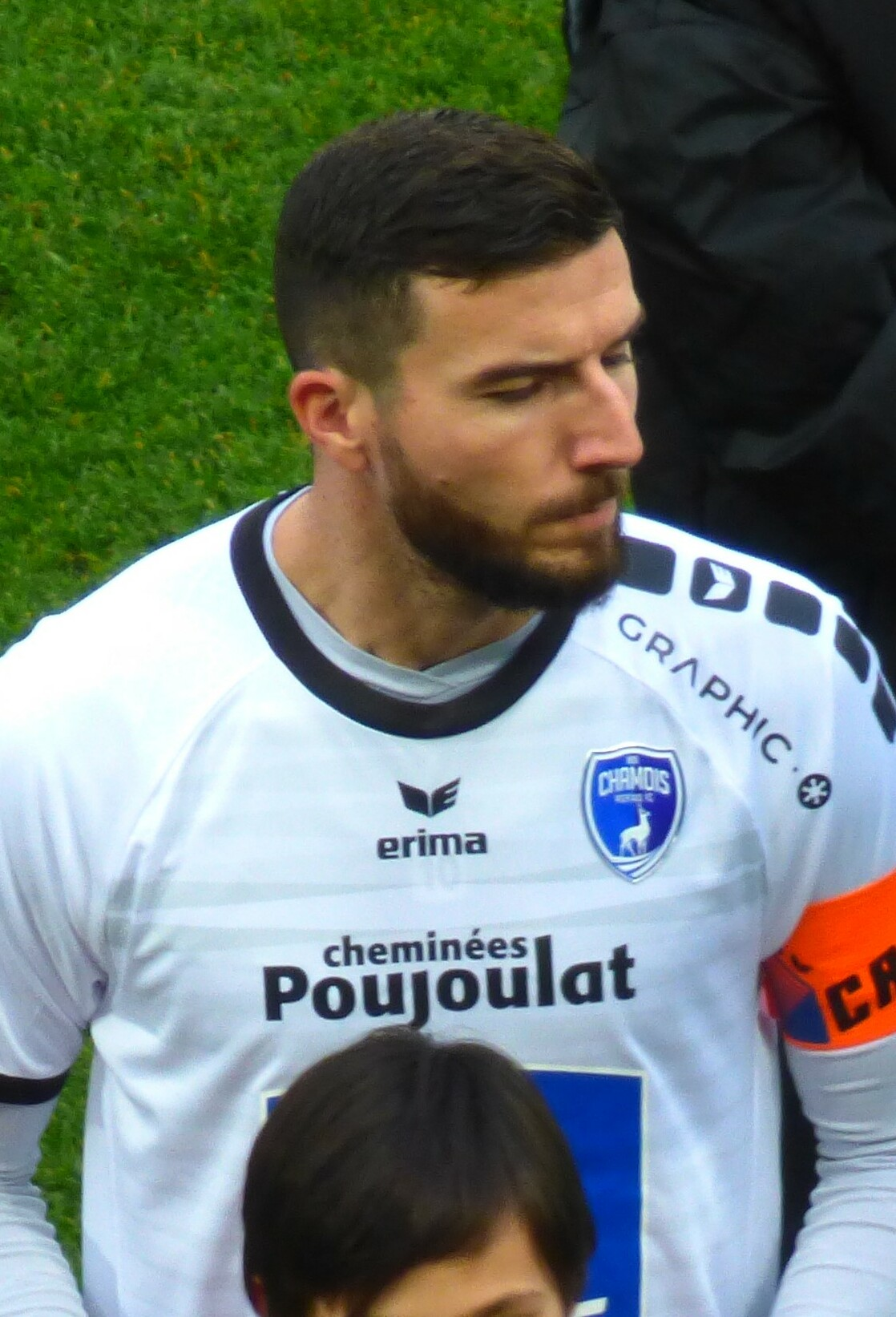
- Sans with Chamois Niortais in 2019

Personal information
- Date of birth: 16 June 1988 (age 38)
- Place of birth: Toulon, France
- Height: 1.91 m (6 ft 3 in)
- Position: Defender

Youth career
- 2003–2008: Monaco

Senior career*
Years	Team	Apps	(Gls)
2008–2010	Arles-Avignon	29	(1)
2010–2014	Bastia	64	(2)
2013–2014	→ Gazélec Ajaccio (loan)	18	(1)
2012–2013	Bastia B	6	(0)
2014–2020	Chamois Niortais	143	(3)
2015–2018	Chamois Niortais B	4	(0)
2020–2022	Annecy	8	(0)
Total		272	(7)
- * Club domestic league appearances and goals

Matthieu Sans (born 16 June 1988) is a French former professional footballer who played as a defender.

== Career ==
Born in Toulon, Sans began his career with Monaco but did not make a first-team appearance for the club before leaving in 2008. (Note: Matthieu Sans – French league stats at LFP – also available in French (archived)) He later had spells with Arles and Corsican side Bastia, where he was part of the team that won successive promotions in 2010–11 and 2011–12 to reach Ligue 1. Sans spent the duration of the 2013–14 season on loan at Championnat National club Gazélec Ajaccio.

On 23 July 2020, Sans signed for Annecy after his release from Chamois Niortais. On 21 October 2022, he retired from professional football to start working as a sport co-ordinator with his former club Chamois Niortais.

== Career statistics ==
Appearances and goals by club, season and competition
Club	Season	League			National cup		League cup		Total	
Club	Season	Division	Apps	Goals	Apps	Goals	Apps	Goals	Apps	Goals
Arles-Avignon	2008–09	National	25	1	0	0	0	0	25	1
Arles-Avignon	2009–10	Ligue 2	4	0			0	0	4	0
Arles-Avignon	Total		29	1			0	0	29	1
Bastia	2010–11	National	34	1			4	1	38	2
Bastia	2011–12	Ligue 2	24	1	1	0	1	1	26	2
Bastia	2012–13	Ligue 1	6	0	0	0	1	0	7	0
Bastia	Total		64	2	1	0	6	2	71	4
Bastia B	2012–13	CFA 2	6	0	—		—		6	0
Gazélec Ajaccio (loan)	2013–14	National	18	1	0	0	0	0	18	1
Chamois Niortais	2014–15	Ligue 2	31	1	2	0	1	0	34	1
Chamois Niortais	2015–16	Ligue 2	22	1	2	0	1	0	25	1
Chamois Niortais	2016–17	Ligue 2	17	0	0	0	1	0	18	0
Chamois Niortais	2017–18	Ligue 2	28	0	1	0	1	0	30	0
Chamois Niortais	2018–19	Ligue 2	19	0	1	0	1	0	21	0
Chamois Niortais	2019–20	Ligue 2	26	1	2	0	0	0	28	1
Chamois Niortais	Total		143	3	8	0	5	0	156	3
Chamois Niortais B	2015–16	CFA 2	2	0	—		—		2	0
Chamois Niortais B	2017–18	National 3	1	0	—		—		1	0
Chamois Niortais B	2018–19	National 3	1	0	—		—		1	0
Chamois Niortais B	Total		4	0	—		—		4	0
Annecy	2020–21	National	7	0	0	0	—		7	0
Annecy	2021–22	National	1	0	0	0	—		1	0
Annecy	Total		8	0	0	0	—		8	0
Career total			272	7	9	0	11	2	292	9
