= Julien Ielsch =

French footballer (born 1983)

Personal information
- Date of birth: 5 March 1983 (age 43)
- Place of birth: Belfort, France
- Height: 1.72 m (5 ft 8 in)
- Position: Defender

Senior career*
Years	Team	Apps	(Gls)
2002–2004	Sochaux	0	(0)
2004–2005	Neuchâtel Xamax	28	(2)
2005–2010	Reims	131	(1)
2010–2013	Amiens	87	(1)
2012	Amiens B	1	(0)
2013–2015	Red Star	60	(1)
2015–2018	Amiens	61	(3)
Total		368	(8)
- * Club domestic league appearances and goals

Julien Ielsch (born 5 March 1983) is a French former professional footballer who played as a defender.

He played on the professional level in Swiss Super League for Neuchâtel Xamax and in Ligue 2 for Stade Reims.
