= Alexandre Garcia (footballer) =

French footballer (born 1988)

Personal information
- Full name: Alexandre Garcia
- Date of birth: 25 June 1988 (age 38)
- Place of birth: Marseille, France
- Height: 1.78 m (5 ft 10 in)
- Position: Forward

Youth career
- ?–2001: AS Gignac
- 2001–2003: SO Septèmes-les-Vallons
- 2003–2006: FC Martigues
- 2006–2008: Ajaccio

Senior career*
Years	Team	Apps	(Gls)
2008–2009	CD Dénia		
2009–2010	Consolat Marseille	1	(0)
2010–2011	Bastia	20	(4)
2011	Étoile Fréjus Saint-Raphaël	4	(0)
2011–2013	FCA Calvi	44	(8)
2013–2014	US Marignane	21	(4)
2014–2016	FC Martigues	29	(4)
- * Club domestic league appearances and goals

Alexandre Garcia (born 25 June 1988) is a French former professional footballer who played for as a forward.
