= David Suarez (footballer) =

French footballer (born 1979)

Personal information
- Date of birth: 9 June 1979 (age 47)
- Place of birth: Rodez, France
- Height: 1.84 m (6 ft 0 in)
- Position: Striker

Senior career*
Years	Team	Apps	(Gls)
1997–1999	Rodez	36	(17)
1999–2002	Cannes	113	(41)
2003–2004	Amiens	45	(17)
2004–2005	Toulouse	22	(5)
2005–2008	Guingamp	61	(13)
2008–2010	Sedan	24	(2)
2010–2012	Bastia	67	(29)
2012–2013	Arles-Avignon	21	(3)
2013–2014	Vannes	25	(5)
2014–2016	Rodez	23	(6)
Total		437	(138)
- * Club domestic league appearances and goals

David Suarez (born 9 June 1979) is a French former professional footballer who played as a striker.
