= Belkacem Zobiri =

French-Algerian footballer and manager (born 1983)

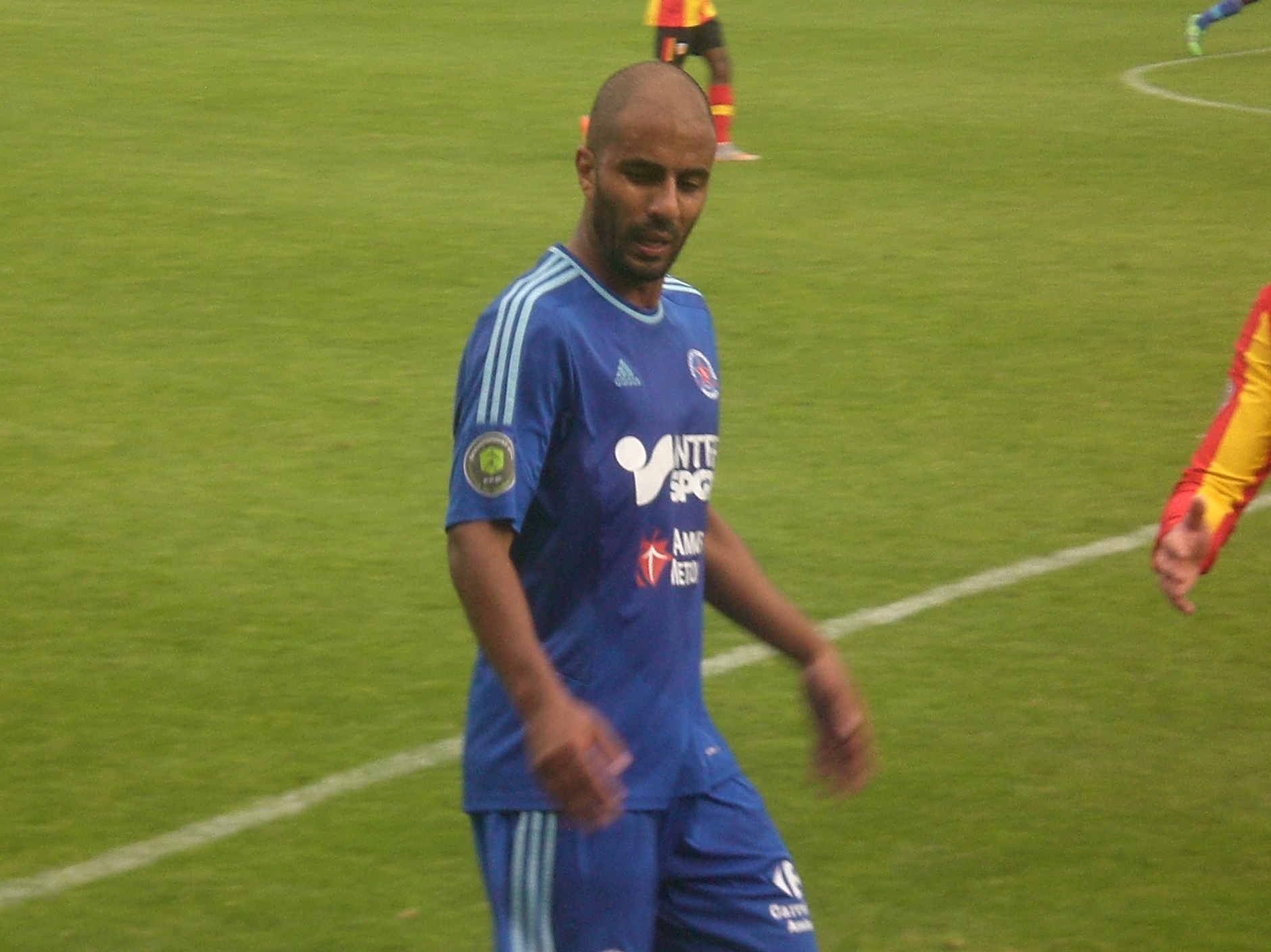
- Zobiri in 2015

Personal information
- Full name: Belkacem Zobiri
- Date of birth: 23 October 1983 (age 43)
- Place of birth: Gap, France
- Height: 1.81 m (5 ft 11 in)
- Position: Midfielder

Team information
- Current team: US Veynes/Serres (Manager)

Youth career
- –2003: Gap

Senior career*
Years	Team	Apps	(Gls)
2003–2007	Gap	94	(17)
2007–2009	Louhans-Cuiseaux	72	(15)
2009–2010	ES Sétif	14	(0)
2010–2012	Amiens	68	(13)
2012–2013	Dunkerque	16	(5)
2013–2014	Cannes	20	(4)
2014–2015	CS Constantine	5	(0)
2015–2018	AC Amiens	81	(10)

Managerial career
- 2015–2019: AC Amiens (U18)
- 2018–2019: AC Amiens (assistant)
- 2019–: US Veynes/Serres
- * Club domestic league appearances and goals

Belkacem Zobiri (born 23 October 1983) is a retired French-Algerian footballer and current manager of US Veynes/Serres.

== Club career ==
Zobiri started off his career in the junior ranks of local club Gap FC. In 2003, he was promoted to the first team and remained at the club for four more seasons. In 2007, he left Gap to join Louhans-Cuiseaux in the Championnat National. In two seasons with the club, he made 72 appearances, scoring 15 goals.

On 9 July 2009 Zobiri signed a two-year contract with Algerian club ES Sétif. However, he left the club after just one season after failing to become a regular.

On 6 June 2010 Zobiri returned to France and signed with the Championnat National side Amiens SC. He was released in May 2012.

== Coaching career ==
Arriving at AC Amiens in 2015, Zobiri took charge of the club's U18 team. 34-year old Zobiri retired at the end of the 2017–18 season and became assistant manager of AC Amiens alongside his U18-manager position. In the summer 2019, he was appointed manager of US Veynes/Serres.
