= Ludovic Genest =

French former professional footballer (born 1987)

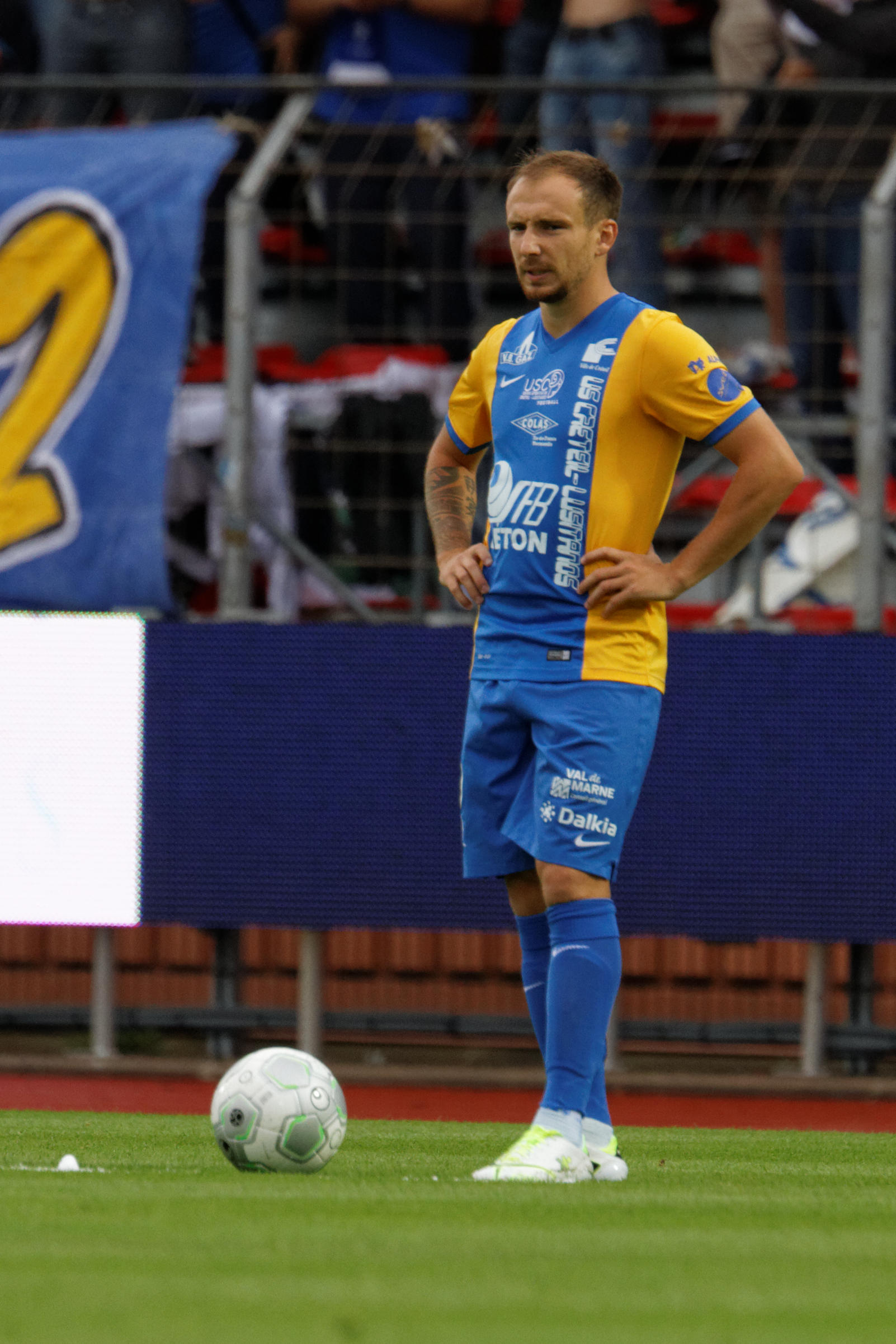
- Genest playing for Créteil against Châteauxroux in August 2014

Personal information
- Date of birth: 18 September 1987 (age 39)
- Place of birth: Thiers, France
- Height: 1.73 m (5 ft 8 in)
- Position: Striker

Senior career*
Years	Team	Apps	(Gls)
2005–2009	Auxerre	3	(0)
2008–2009	→ Bastia (loan)	30	(4)
2009–2011	Laval	72	(9)
2011–2014	Bastia	25	(3)
2012–2013	→ Istres (loan)	29	(3)
2014–2015	Créteil	38	(1)
2015–2017	Clermont	40	(2)
2017	Andrézieux	11	(0)
2018–2019	Bastia	20	(1)
Total		268	(23)
- * Club domestic league appearances and goals

Ludovic Genest (born 18 September 1987) is a French former professional footballer who played as a striker.

== Career ==
Born in Thiers, Genest previously played for Auxerre, Bastia, Laval and Istres. He scored his first Ligue 1 goal in a Bastia's 2–1 defeat at Lille on 15 December 2013. He signed an 18-month contract with US Créteil-Lusitanos in January 2014, and went on to play 38 league games for the club.

On 10 June 2015, it was announced that Genest had signed a two-year deal with Clermont Foot.

Genest decided to retire at the end of the 2018–19 season.
