= Amiran Sanaia =

Georgian footballer

Personal information
- Date of birth: 3 September 1989 (age 37)
- Place of birth: Sukhumi, Soviet Union
- Height: 1.81 m (5 ft 11 in)
- Position: Left-back

Senior career*
Years	Team	Apps	(Gls)
2005–2008	FC Zestafoni	1	(0)
2008–2010	Le Mans	0	(0)
2011–2012	Bastia	16	(0)
2013–2014	Luzenac	27	(1)
2014–2016	Paris FC	3	(0)
2015	Paris FC II	11	(0)
2016–2017	Les Herbiers	8	(0)
2017–2023	Rodez	92	(0)
2020–2023	Rodez II	3	(0)

International career
2005	Georgia U17	2	(0)
2006–2007	Georgia U19	4	(0)
2008–2010	Georgia U21	6	(0)
2007–2009	Georgia	6	(0)
- * Club domestic league appearances and goals

Amiran Sanaia (Georgian: ამირან სანაია; born 3 September 1989) is a Georgian former professional footballer who played as a left-back.

== Club career ==
Born in the Soviet Union, Sanaia moved to France to play club football with Le Mans FC in 2007. He has since played for SC Bastia, Luzenac AP, Paris FC, Les Herbiers VF and Rodez.

Sanaia was forced to retire from playing upon the expiration of his contract with Rodez in 2023. He suffered from tissue cancer at his hip, the cancer treatment was successful, but he still was not able to train and play at full strength.

== International career ==
Sanaia received his first call-up to the Georgia national team in November 2007. He made his Georgia debut on 16 November 2007, a friendly match 2–1 won against Qatar. He played another match on 31 May 2008 versus Portugal and on 12 August 2009 versus Malta.
