= Jérémy Choplin =

French footballer (born 1985)

Personal information
- Date of birth: 9 February 1985 (age 41)
- Place of birth: Le Mans, France
- Height: 1.83 m (6 ft 0 in)
- Position: Defender

Senior career*
Years	Team	Apps	(Gls)
2005–2007	Le Mans	2	(0)
2006	→ Bayonne (loan)	16	(0)
2006–2007	→ Entente SSG (loan)	25	(0)
2007–2008	Beauvais	35	(0)
2008–2010	Rodez	71	(7)
2010–2013	Bastia	95	(6)
2013–2015	Metz	57	(2)
2015–2018	Niort	105	(6)
2018–2020	Ajaccio	42	(6)
2020–2021	Le Mans	29	(1)
2021–2023	Gazélec Ajaccio	29	(1)
- * Club domestic league appearances and goals as of 1 July 2023

Jérémy Choplin (born 9 February 1985) is a French professional footballer who plays as a defender.

== Club career ==
Choplin previously played in Ligue 1 for Le Mans, Bastia and Metz. On 3 August 2021, he signed with fifth-tier Championnat National 3 club Gazélec Ajaccio.

== Personal life ==
Jérémy's brother Romain is also a footballer playing at the amateur level.

== Career statistics ==
As of matches played 18 December 2020

Appearances and goals by club, season and competition
Club	Season	League			Coupe de France		Coupe de la Ligue		Total	
Club	Season	Division	Apps	Goals	Apps	Goals	Apps	Goals	Apps	Goals
Le Mans	2005–06	Ligue 1	2	0	1	0	0	0	3	0
Bayonne (loan)	2005–06	National	16	0	0	0	0	0	16	0
Entente SSG	2006–07	National	25	0	2	1	0	0	27	1
Beauvais	2007–08	National	35	0	2	0	0	0	37	0
Rodez	2008–09	National	35	3	7	4	0	0	42	7
Rodez	2009–10	National	36	4	4	0	0	0	40	4
Bastia	2010–11	National	33	3	3	1	3	0	39	4
Bastia	2011–12	Ligue 2	35	3	4	1	0	0	39	4
Bastia	2012–13	Ligue 1	27	0	1	0	3	0	31	0
Metz	2013–14	Ligue 2	36	2	2	0	1	0	39	2
Metz	2014–15	Ligue 1	21	0	1	0	1	0	23	0
Chamois Niortais	2015–16	Ligue 2	33	1	3	0	1	0	37	1
Chamois Niortais	2016–17	Ligue 2	34	3	5	0	1	0	40	3
Chamois Niortais	2017–18	Ligue 2	38	2	1	0	1	0	40	2
Ajaccio	2018–19	Ligue 2	27	3	0	0	1	0	28	3
Ajaccio	2019–20	Ligue 2	15	3	1	0	1	0	17	3
Le Mans	2019–20	Ligue 2	7	0	—		—		7	0
Le Mans	2020–21	National	10	0	0	0	—		10	0
Career total			465	27	37	7	13	0	515	34
