= Guy-Roland Niangbo =

Ivorian footballer

Personal information
- Full name: Guy-Roland Niangbo Nassa
- Date of birth: May 21, 1986 (age 40)
- Place of birth: Abobo, Ivory Coast
- Height: 1.82 m (6 ft 0 in)
- Position: Left winger

Team information
- Current team: ASE Chastre

Youth career
- 2001–2005: Toumodi FC

Senior career*
Years	Team	Apps	(Gls)
2005–2008	Charleroi-Marchienne	33	(11)
2008–2011	Bastia	36	(2)
2011	→ Tubize (loan)	12	(1)
2011–2012	Luzenac	14	(4)
2012–2015	Istres	42	(8)
2015–2016	Boulogne	33	(1)
2016–2018	Marseille Consolat	45	(7)
2018–2019	Martigues	42	(7)
2019–2020	RUS Rebecq		
2020–	ASE Chastre		
- * Club domestic league appearances and goals

Guy-Roland Niangbo Nassa (born 21 May 1986) is an Ivorian professional footballer who plays as a left winger for Belgian club ASE Chastre.

== Career ==
Niangbo began his career in 2001 with Toumodi FC and moved to the Belgium club Charleroi-Marchienne in July 2005. There, he scored 12 goals in 33 games. He moved to Bastia in July 2008. In January 2011, he joined Tubize in the Belgian Second Division on loan.

Ahead of the 2019–20 season, Niangbo joined Belgian club RUS Rebecq.
