= 2006–07 SC Bastia season =

SC Bastia
2006–07 season
- Chairman: Charles Orlanducci
- Manager: Bernard Casoni
- Stadium: Stade Armand Cesari
- Ligue 2: 9th
- Coupe de France: End of 64
- Coupe de la Ligue: 2. tour
- Top goalscorer: League: Pierre-Yves André (9); All: Pierre-Yves André (10)
- Highest home attendance: 5,352 vs Ajaccio (27 April 2007)
- Lowest home attendance: 2,114 vs Sete (22 August 2007)
- Average home league attendance: 3,300
Home colours	Away colours

French football club SC Bastia's 2006–07 season. Finished 9th place in league. Top scorer of the season, including 10 goals in 9 league matches have been Pierre-Yves André. Was eliminated to Coupe de France end of 64, the Coupe de la Ligue was able to be among the 2. tour.

== Transfers ==
=== In ===
Summer

- Frédéric Mendy from St. Etienne
- Franco Dolci and Florian Jarjat from Nice
- Christophe Gaffory from Bastia B
- Damien Bridonneau from Guingamp
- Mehdi Méniri from Metz
- Austin Ejide from Etoile du Sahel

Winter

- Alexandre Licata from AS Monaco

=== Out ===
Summer

- Paul Essola to Stal Alchevsk
- Fabrice Jau to Sedan
- David Sauget to Nancy
- Bernt Haas to Köln
- Nicolas Penneteau to Valenciennes
- Price Jolibois to free
- Mounir Diane to Lens
- Franck Matingou to free

Winter

- Pascal Camadini to Strasbourg
- Florian Jarjat to Dijon
- Alexandre Licata to Gueugnon
- Christophe Meslin to Guingamp

== Squad ==
As of 24 June 2012

Note: Flags indicate national team as defined under FIFA eligibility rules; some limited exceptions apply. Players may hold more than one non-FIFA nationality.

No.	Pos.	Nation	Player
1	GK	(Nigeria) NGA	Austin Ejide
2	DF	(France) FRA	Eric Marester
3	DF	(France) FRA	Arnaud Maire
4	DF	(France) FRA	Florent Laville
5	DF	(France) FRA	Grégory Lorenzi
6	MF	(Argentina) ARG	Franco Dolci
7	FW	(Algeria) ALG	Abdelmalek Cherrad
8	MF	(France) FRA	Yohan Gomez
9	FW	(France) FRA	Frédéric Née
10	MF	(France) FRA	Pascal Camadini
11	MF	(Senegal) SEN	Frédéric Mendy
12	MF	(France) FRA	Serisay Barthélémy
13	MF	(France) FRA	Anthony Bral
14	FW	(Burkina Faso) BFA	Henoc Conombo
15	DF	(France) FRA	Florian Jarjat

No.	Pos.	Nation	Player
15	FW	(France) FRA	Christophe Gaffory
16	GK	(France) FRA	Jean-Louis Leca
17	DF	(France) FRA	Damien Bridonneau
18	DF	(France) FRA	Yannick Cahuzac
19	FW	(France) FRA	Christophe Meslin
20	FW	(France) FRA	Pierre-Yves André
21	DF	(France) FRA	Gilles Cioni
22	FW	(Comoros) COM	Samir Bertin d'Avesnes
23	DF	(Algeria) ALG	Mehdi Méniri
24	MF	(France) FRA	Florent Ghisolfi
25	MF	(France) FRA	Gary Coulibaly
26	MF	(France) FRA	Foed Kalaoui
27	MF	(France) FRA	Anthony Abou Deraa
29	MF	(Tunisia) TUN	Chaouki Ben Saada
30	GK	(Cameroon) CMR	Jules Goda

== Ligue 2 ==
=== League table ===
Pos	Team	Pld	W	D	L	GF	GA	GD	Pts
7	Châteauroux	38	15	9	14	42	44	−2	54
8	Dijon	38	14	12	12	44	47	−3	54
9	Bastia	38	14	11	13	52	49	+3	53
10	Gueugnon	38	13	9	16	47	52	−5	48
11	Reims	38	12	11	15	43	46	−3	47

Source: Ligue 2

=== Results summary ===
Overall								Home						Away					
Pld	W	D	L	GF	GA	GD	Pts	W	D	L	GF	GA	GD	W	D	L	GF	GA	GD
38	14	11	13	52	49	+3	53	10	5	4	33	18	+15	4	6	9	19	31	−12

Last updated: 24 June 2012.
Source: lfp.fr

=== Results by round ===
Round	1	2	3	4	5	6	7	8	9	10	11	12	13	14	15	16	17	18	19	20	21	22	23	24	25	26	27	28	29	30	31	32	33	34	35	36	37	38
Ground	A	H	A	H	A	A	H	A	H	A	H	A	H	A	H	A	H	A	H	A	H	A	H	H	A	H	A	H	A	H	A	H	A	H	A	H	A	H
Result	D	W	W	W	L	L	D	L	W	L	L	W	D	L	D	W	D	D	L	D	W	L	W	W	D	W	D	D	W	W	L	L	L	W	D	L	L	W
Position	7	5	3	1	4	7	8	8	8	9	10	9	9	10	11	10	10	10	11	12	10	11	10	9	9	8	7	8	6	6	6	6	8	8	8	9	9	9

W = Win; D = Draw; L = Loss

=== Matches ===
Date	Opponent	H / A	Result	Goal(s)	Attendance	Referee
28 July 2006	Istres	A	2 - 2	Laville 6', Meslin 87'	3,326	Pascal Viléo
4 August 2006	Reims	H	1 - 0	Gomez (red card) 7', F. Mendy 41'	4,750	Philippe Malige
7 August 2006	Libourne	A	2 - 4	André 12', Brillault 50' (o.g.), G. Coulibaly (red card) 74', Meslin 82', 90+3'	3,170	Stéphane Moulin
11 August 2006	Brest	H	4 - 2	Meslin 54' (pen.), Maire 70', Camadini 80', F. Mendy 90+3'	5,102	Jérôme Auroux
18 August 2006	Caen	A	2 - 0	-	19,135	Bruno Derrien
25 August 2006	Metz	A	2 - 1	Conombo 4'	12,712	Fredy Fautrel
8 September 2006	Dijon	H	1 - 1	Marester 4'	3,385	Sandryk Biton
15 September 2006	Montpellier	A	4 - 0	Méniri (yellow card) 45+3' (yellow-red card)	4,743	Alexandre Castro
22 September 2006	Niort	H	4 - 1	F. Mendy 19', André 45+1', Cherrad 71', Gomez 80'	3,189	Gaël Lecellier
2 October 2006	Amiens	A	1 - 0	-	6,948	Didier Falcone
13 October 2006	Châteauroux	H	1 - 2	Méniri 34'	3,151	Stéphane Djiouzi
23 October 2006	Tours	A	0 - 3	Méniri 35', Meslin 51', 54'	4,670	Bruno Ruffray
27 October 2006	Guingamp	H	0 - 0	-	3,401	Bruno Derrien
3 November 2006	Créteil	A	1 - 0	-	4,807	Cédric Cotrel
7 November 2006	Le Havre	H	1 - 1	Ghisolfi 70'	2,753	Philippe Gasquet
10 November 2006	Ajaccio	A	0 - 1	Née 58'	5,246	Tony Chapron
17 November 2006	Grenoble	H	0 - 0	-	3,220	Didier Falcone
1 December 2006	Strasbourg	A	1 - 1	F. Mendy 55'	13,555	Bertrand Layec
8 December 2006	Gueugnon	H	0 - 1	Cioni (red card) 90+3'	2,958	Olivier Lamarre
23 December 2006	Reims	A	1 - 1	Cahuzac 52'	6,558	Sandryk Biton
12 January 2007	Libourne	H	3 - 2	André 42' (pen.), Gomez 69', Barthélémy 71'	2,661	Ruddy Buquet
26 January 2007	Brest	A	3 - 1	Laville (yellow card) 35' (yellow-red card) , André 35'	4,388	Gaël Lecellier
2 February 2007	Caen	H	2 - 0	André 22', Cherrad 34', Barthélémy (yellow card) 42' (yellow-red card)	2,884	Olivier Thual
12 February 2007	Metz	H	1 - 0	Méniri (red card) 62', Cherrad 70'	2,535	Pascal Viléo
16 February 2007	Dijon	A	0 - 0	-	6,213	Bruno Derrien
23 February 2007	Montpellier	H	1 - 0	Cambon 19' (o.g.)	2,989	Philippe Chat
2 March 2007	Niort	A	0 - 0	-	4,221	Gérald Grégoire
9 March 2007	Amiens	H	2 - 2	Mendy 12', Cherrad 57'	2,980	Laurent Duhamel
16 March 2007	Châteauroux	A	1 - 2	Lorenzi 24', Gomez 51'	7,341	Christian Guillard
30 March 2007	Tours	H	2 - 0	André 30' (pen.), Ben Saada 67', Ejide (red card) 90+3'	2,870	Cédric Cotrel
6 April 2007	Guingamp	A	4 - 0	-	9,251	Jérôme Auroux
13 April 2007	Créteil	H	1 - 2	Cherrad 87'	2,693	Didier Falcone
20 April 2007	Le Havre	A	2 - 0	-	9,589	Stéphane Djiouzi
27 April 2007	Ajaccio	H	4 - 1	André 18', 48', 72' (pen.), Cherrad 75'	5,352	Éric Poulat
4 May 2007	Grenoble	A	1 - 1	Cherrad 84'	6,445	Julian Grelot
11 May 2007	Strasbourg	H	1 - 2	Gomez 4'	3,346	Damien Ledentu
18 May 2007	Gueugnon	A	4 - 2	S. d'Avesnes 23', Gaffory 81'	6,642	Bruno Derrien
25 May 2007	Istres	H	4 - 1	Barthélémy 13', 26', 48', Lorenzi 40' (pen.)	2,485	Cédric Cotrel

== Coupe de France ==
Date	Round	Opponent	H / A	Result	Goal(s)	Attendance	Referee
17 December 2006	8th tour	Cannes	A	[ 2 - 2] (pen. 5-6)	Barthélémy 46', Ben Saada (red card) 71', André 89'	?	Sébastien Desiage
6 January 2007	End of 64	Bordeaux	A	[ 2 - 0]	-	7,783	Thierry Auriac

== Coupe de la Ligue ==
Date	Round	Opponent	H / A	Result	Goal(s)	Attendance	Referee
22 August 2006	Second tour	Sete	H	0 - 0 (pen. 3-5)	-	2,114	Antony Gautier

== Statistics ==
=== Top scorers ===
As of 24 June 2012

Place	Position	Nation	Name	Ligue 2	Coupe de France	Coupe de la Ligue	Total
1	FW	(France)	Pierre-Yves André	9	1	0	10
2	FW	(Algeria)	Abdelmalek Cherrad	7	0	0	7
3	FW	(France)	Christophe Meslin	6	1	0	6
4	MF	(Senegal)	Frédéric Mendy	5	0	0	5
=	MF	(France)	Serisay Barthélémy	4	1	0	5
6	MF	(France)	Yohan Gomez	4	0	0	4
7	DF	(Algeria)	Mehdi Méniri	2	0	0	2
=	DF	(France)	Grégory Lorenzi	2	0	0	2
9	FW	(Tunisia)	Chaouki Ben Saada	1	0	0	1
=	DF	(France)	Florent Laville	1	0	0	1
=	FW	(France)	Christophe Gaffory	1	0	0	1
=	FW	(Burkina Faso)	Henoc Conombo	1	0	0	1
=	MF	(Comoros)	Samir Bertin d'Avesnes	1	0	0	1
=	MF	(France)	Yannick Cahuzac	1	0	0	1
=	MF	(France)	Florent Ghisolfi	1	0	0	1
=	MF	(France)	Pascal Camadini	1	0	0	1
=	DF	(France)	Eric Marester	1	0	0	1
=	DF	(France)	Arnaud Maire	1	0	0	1
=	FW	(France)	Frédéric Née	1	0	0	1

=== League top assists ===
As of 24 June 2012

Place	Position	Nation	Name	Assists
1	FW	(France)	Pierre-Yves André	8
2	FW	(Algeria)	Abdelmalek Cherrad	5
=	MF	(Senegal)	Frédéric Mendy	5
4	MF	(Tunisia)	Chaouki Ben Saada	3
=	MF	(France)	Serisay Barthélémy	3
6	DF	(France)	Eric Marester	2
7	DF	(Algeria)	Mehdi Méniri	1
=	DF	(France)	Arnaud Maire	1
