= 2005–06 SC Bastia season =

SC Bastia
2005–06 season
- Chairman: Louis Multari
- Manager: Bernard Casoni
- Stadium: Stade Armand Cesari
- Ligue 2: 6th
- Coupe de France: End of 16
- Coupe de la Ligue: 1. tour
- Top goalscorer: League: Pierre-Yves André (12); All: Pierre-Yves André (16)
- Highest home attendance: 10,254 vs Montpellier (18 December 2005)
- Lowest home attendance: 202 vs Châteauroux (12 May 2006)
- Average home league attendance: 4,456
Home colours	Away colours

French football club SC Bastia's 2005–06 season. Finished 6th place in league. Top scorer of the season, including 12 goals in 16 league matches have been Pierre-Yves André. Was eliminated to Coupe de France end of 16, the Coupe de la Ligue was able to be among the 1. tour.

== Transfers ==
=== In ===
Summer

- Yannick Cahuzac from Bastia B
- Pascal Camadini from Strasbourg
- Price Jolibois from Servette
- Florent Laville from Coventry City
- Grégory Lorenzi from Royal Mouscron-Péruwelz
- Arnaud Maire from Besançon
- Yohan Gomez from Lyon
- Eric Marester from Troyes
- Mounir Diane from Lens
- Christophe Meslin from Nice

Winter

- Serisay Barthélémy from free

=== Out ===
Summer

- Alex Song to Arsenal
- Cédric Uras to Clermont
- Christian Karembeu to retired
- Anthar Yahia to Nice
- Tony Vairelles to Lierse
- Romain Rocchi and Stéphane Ziani to Ajaccio
- Djibril Sidibé to Châteauroux
- Youssouf Hadji to Rennes
- Sébastien Piocelle to Crotone
- Benjamin Longue to CA Bastia
- Pascal Chimbonda to Wigan Athletic

Winter

- No.

== Squad ==
As of 25 June 2012

Note: Flags indicate national team as defined under FIFA eligibility rules; some limited exceptions apply. Players may hold more than one non-FIFA nationality.

No.	Pos.	Nation	Player
1	GK	(France) FRA	Nicolas Penneteau
2	DF	(France) FRA	Eric Marester
3	DF	(France) FRA	Arnaud Maire
4	DF	(France) FRA	Florent Laville
5	DF	(France) FRA	Grégory Lorenzi
6	DF	(Switzerland) SUI	Bernt Haas
7	FW	(Algeria) ALG	Abdelmalek Cherrad
8	MF	(Morocco) MAR	Mounir Diane
9	FW	(France) FRA	Frédéric Née
10	MF	(France) FRA	Pascal Camadini
11	MF	(France) FRA	Yohan Gomez
12	MF	(France) FRA	Serisay Barthelemy
13	MF	(Cameroon) CMR	Paul Essola
14	FW	(Burkina Faso) BFA	Henoch Conombo
15	DF	(France) FRA	Teddy Conesa

No.	Pos.	Nation	Player
16	GK	(France) FRA	Jean-Louis Leca
17	MF	(France) FRA	Franck Matingou
18	DF	(France) FRA	Yannick Cahuzac
19	FW	(France) FRA	Christophe Meslin
20	MF	(France) FRA	Pierre-Yves André
22	FW	(Comoros) COM	Samir Bertin d'Avesnes
23	DF	(France) FRA	David Sauget
24	DF	(France) FRA	Florent Ghisolfi
25	MF	(France) FRA	Gary Coulibaly
26	MF	(France) FRA	Fabrice Jau
27	DF	(France) FRA	Price Jolibois
27	FW	(Ivory Coast) CIV	Hervé Guy
29	FW	(France) FRA	Chaouki Ben Saada
30	GK	(Cameroon) CMR	Jules Goda

== Ligue 2 ==
=== League table ===
Pos	Team	Pld	W	D	L	GF	GA	GD	Pts
4	Caen	38	18	12	8	56	35	+21	66
5	Dijon	38	16	12	10	47	32	+15	60
6	Bastia	38	16	10	12	47	40	+7	58
7	Le Havre	38	13	16	9	48	41	+7	55
8	Créteil	38	13	15	10	46	33	+13	54

Source: Ligue 2

=== Results summary ===
Overall								Home						Away					
Pld	W	D	L	GF	GA	GD	Pts	W	D	L	GF	GA	GD	W	D	L	GF	GA	GD
38	16	10	12	47	40	+7	58	9	5	5	28	16	+12	7	5	7	19	24	−5

Last updated: 24 June 2012.
Source: lfp.fr

=== Results by round ===
Round	1	2	3	4	5	6	7	8	9	10	11	12	13	14	15	16	17	18	19	20	21	22	23	24	25	26	27	28	29	30	31	32	33	34	35	36	37	38
Ground	A	H	A	H	A	H	A	H	A	H	A	H	A	H	A	H	A	A	H	A	H	A	H	A	H	A	H	A	H	A	H	A	H	A	H	H	A	H
Result	D	D	W	W	W	L	W	W	W	L	D	L	W	W	W	L	D	D	D	D	W	W	W	W	L	L	D	W	W	L	W	L	L	L	L	D	D	L
Position	7	11	6	5	2	2	3	2	1	1	2	3	4	3	2	2	3	3	3	4	4	4	2	2	2	2	2	2	1	2	2	3	4	5	6	6	5	6

W = Win; D = Draw; L = Loss

=== Matches ===
Date	Opponent	H / A	Result	Goal(s)	Attendance	Referee
29 July 2005	Châteauroux	A	1 - 1	Camadini 51'	6,340	Olivier Thual
5 August 2005	Créteil	H	1 - 1	André 22'	4,873	Tony Chapron
12 August 2005	Amiens	A	1 - 2	Jau 12', Conombo 84'	7,582	Damien Ledentu
16 August 2005	Brest	H	4 - 1	Lorenzi 35' (pen.), 55' (pen.), Jau 65', 69'	5,498	Philippe Malige
22 August 2005	Valenciennes	A	0 - 1	Née 9'	9,688	Sandryk Biton
26 August 2005	Reims	H	0 - 1	-	6,159	Eric Brocas
12 September 2005	Laval	A	1 - 2	Maire 87', Meslin 90'	5,621	Ruddy Buquet
16 September 2005	Clermont	H	4 - 0	Jau 13', André 14', 63', Née 76'	5,051	Saïd Ennjimi
23 September 2005	Guingamp	A	0 - 1	Meslin 22'	9,260	Olivier Lamarre
13 December 2005	Sedan	H	1 - 1	Jau 20'	5,199	Patrick Lhermite
7 October 2005	Sete	A	1 - 0	-	2,785	Yves Brizou
14 October 2005	Lorient	H	1 - 1	André 73' (pen.)	4,939	Thierry Auriac
24 October 2005	Istres	A	0 - 0	-	3,776	Améziane Khendek
29 October 2005	Grenoble	H	2 - 0	Camadini 57', 90'	4,249	Fredy Fautrel
4 November 2005	Dijon	A	0 - 2	Meslin 33', Lorenzi (red card) 37', Jau 63'	3,800	Pascal Viléo
11 November 2005	Gueugnon	H	2 - 0	Haas 70', André 81'	4,627	Bruno Coué
25 November 2005	Caen	A	4 - 1	Meslin 70'	12,365	Bruno Derrien
5 December 2005	Le Havre	A	2 - 2	Meslin 68', 88'	8,289	Stéphane Lannoy
18 December 2005	Montpellier	H	0 - 0	-	10,254	Jean-Marc Bonnin
3 January 2006	Créteil	A	1 - 1	André (red card) 60', Meslin 84'	4,805	Stéphane Bré
10 January 2006	Amiens	H	2 - 0	Camadini 10', Meslin 55'	3,687	Alexandre Castro
16 January 2006	Brest	A	0 - 2	André 40', Jau 52'	3,851	Thierry Auriac
23 January 2006	Valenciennes	H	1 - 0	Sauget 76'	4,300	Hervé Piccirillo
7 March 2006	Reims	A	0 - 1	Ghisolfi 50'	5,159	Sandryk Biton
10 February 2006	Laval	H	3 - 0	André 50', Meslin 61', Sauget 76'	4,144	Olivier Lamarre
17 February 2006	Clermont	A	2 - 0	-	4,716	Bertrand Layec
24 February 2006	Guingamp	H	1 - 2	Diane 13' (pen.)	3,716	Sébastien Moreira
3 March 2006	Sedan	A	1 - 1	Coulibaly (red card) 56', André 70'	11,191	Tony Chapron
10 March 2006	Sete	H	1 - 0	Meslin 83' (pen.)	4,317	Dominique Fraise
17 March 2006	Lorient	A	1 - 0	Cherrad (red card) 56'	10,462	Saïd Ennjimi
24 March 2006	Istres	H	3 - 0	André 58', 83', Yahiaoui 78' (o.g.)	3,796	Ruddy Buquet
3 April 2006	Grenoble	A	5 - 1	André 85'	6,029	Thierry Auriac
7 April 2006	Dijon	H	0 - 2	-	4,769	Stéphane Bré
14 April 2006	Gueugnon	A	2 - 0	-	3,999	Eric Brocas
21 April 2006	Caen	H	0 - 2	The match was ending due to the spectators entering the field in the 80th minute. Stade Armand Cesari was suspended two matches.	4,520	Pascal Viléo
28 April 2006	Le Havre	H	1 - 1	André 61'	359	Gérald Grégoire
5 May 2006	Montpellier	A	1 - 1	Conombo 61'	8,296	Ruddy Buquet
12 May 2006	Châteauroux	H	1 - 4	Kahlaoui 63'	202	Jérôme Auroux

== Coupe de France ==
Date	Round	Opponent	H / A	Result	Goal(s)	Attendance	Referee
20 November 2005	7. Tour	St.-Joseph	A	[ 0 - 8]	André 29', 44', 61', 85', Née 73', Y. Gomez 81', 90+2', Marester 90'	?	?
10 December 2005	8. Tour	Jura Sud	A	[ 0 - 2]	M. Traore 78'(o.g.), Jau 83'	1,201	Dominique Fraise
7 January 2006	End of 64	Louhans	H	[ 3 - 3] (pen. 3 - 1)	Meslin 28', Conombo 68', Ghisolfi 88'	1,500	Didier Falcone
28 January 2006	End of 32	Agde	H	[ 2 - 0] (a.e.t.)	Conombo 97', 108'	1,500	Jean-Marc Bonnin
21 March 2006	End of 16	Lyon	A	[ 1 - 0]	-	28,000	Philippe Kalt

== Coupe de la Ligue ==
Date	Round	Opponent	H / A	Result	Goal(s)	Attendance	Referee
20 September 2005	First tour	Dijon	A	2 - 1	Camadini 40', Cahuzac (yellow card) 61' (yellow-red card)	3,270	Améziane Khendek

== Statistics ==
=== Top scorers ===
As of 27 October 2012

Place	Position	Nation	Name	Ligue 2	Coupe de France	Coupe de la Ligue	Total
1	FW	(France)	Pierre-Yves André	12	4	0	16
2	FW	(France)	Christophe Meslin	10	1	0	11
3	MF	(France)	Fabrice Jau	7	1	0	8
4	MF	(France)	Pascal Camadini	4	1	0	5
=	FW	(Burkina Faso)	Henoc Conombo	2	3	0	5
6	MF	(France)	David Sauget	4	1	0	5
7	FW	(France)	Frédéric Née	2	1	0	3
8	DF	(France)	Grégory Lorenzi	2	0	0	2
=	MF	(France)	Florent Ghisolfi	1	1	0	2
=	MF	(France)	Yohan Gomez	0	2	0	2
11	MF	(France)	Foued Kahlaoui	1	0	0	1
=	DF	(France)	Arnaud Maire	1	0	0	1
=	MF	(Morocco)	Mounir Diane	1	0	0	1
=	DF	(Switzerland)	Bernt Haas	1	0	0	1
=	DF	(France)	Eric Marester	0	1	0	1

=== League top assists ===
As of 24 June 2012

Place	Position	Nation	Name	Assists
1	FW	(France)	Christophe Meslin	10
2	FW	(France)	Pierre-Yves André	6
3	MF	(France)	Fabrice Jau	5
=	MF	(Tunisia)	Chaouki Ben Saada	5
=	FW	(France)	Frédéric Née	5
6	MF	(France)	Pascal Camadini	4
7	MF	(Morocco)	Mounir Diane	3
=	DF	(France)	David Sauget	3
9	MF	(France)	Yohan Gomez	2
10	DF	(Switzerland)	Bernt Haas	1
=	DF	(France)	Eric Marester	1
=	FW	(Algeria)	Abdelmalek Cherrad	1
