= 2007–08 SC Bastia season =

SC Bastia
2007–08 season
- Chairman: Charles Orlanducci
- Manager: Bernard Casoni
- Stadium: Stade Armand Cesari
- Ligue 2: 11th
- Coupe de France: End of 16
- Coupe de la Ligue: 1. tour
- Top goalscorer: League: Xavier Pentecôte (12); All: Xavier Pentecôte (13)
- Highest home attendance: 4,465 vs Ajaccio (5 April 2008)
- Lowest home attendance: 0 vs Châteauroux (25 April 2008)
- Average home league attendance: 2,685
Home colours	Away colours

French football club SC Bastia's 2007–08 season. Finished 11th place in league. Top scorer of the season, including 13 goals in 12 league matches have been Xavier Pentecôte. Was eliminated to Coupe de France end of 16, the Coupe de la Ligue was able to be among the 1. tour.

== Transfers ==
=== In ===
Summer

- Xavier Pentecôte from Toulouse
- Féthi Harek from Rodez
- Fabrice Jau from Sedan
- Alexandre Licata from AS Monaco
- Kafoumba Coulibaly from Tero Sasana
- Jean-Christophe Cesto from Marseille Consolat
- Hassoun Camara from Marseille

Winter

- No.

=== Out ===
Summer

- Franco Dolci to Talleres
- Abdelmalek Cherrad to free
- Frédéric Née to retired
- Florent Laville to retired
- Eric Marester to Troyes
- Foued Kalaoui to Gazélec Ajaccio
- Patrice Sorbara to CA Bastia
- Abouderaa Anthony to AS Monaco
- Gilles Cioni to Paris FC

Winter

- Mehdi Méniri to Al-Khor

== Squad ==
As of 24 June 2012

Note: Flags indicate national team as defined under FIFA eligibility rules; some limited exceptions apply. Players may hold more than one non-FIFA nationality.

No.	Pos.	Nation	Player
1	GK	NGA	Austin Ejide
2	DF	FRA	Jean-Christophe Cesto
3	DF	FRA	Arnaud Maire
5	DF	FRA	Grégory Lorenzi
6	DF	FRA	Hassoun Camara
7	MF	CIV	Kafoumba Coulibaly
8	MF	FRA	Yohan Gomez
9	FW	FRA	Xavier Pentecôte
10	FW	FRA	Alexandre Licata
11	MF	SEN	Frédéric Mendy
12	MF	FRA	Serisay Barthélémy
14	FW	BFA	Henoc Conombo
15	MF	FRA	Pierre-François Sodini

No.	Pos.	Nation	Player
16	GK	FRA	Jean-Louis Leca
17	DF	FRA	Damien Bridonneau
18	DF	FRA	Yannick Cahuzac
19	FW	FRA	Christophe Gaffory
20	FW	FRA	Pierre-Yves André
21	DF	FRA	Féthi Harek
22	FW	COM	Samir Bertin d'Avesnes
23	DF	ALG	Mehdi Méniri
24	MF	FRA	Florent Ghisolfi
26	MF	FRA	Fabrice Jau
27	MF	FRA	Anthony Abou Deraa
29	MF	TUN	Chaouki Ben Saada
30	GK	CMR	Jules Goda

== Ligue 2 ==
=== League table ===
Pos	Team	Pld	W	D	L	GF	GA	GD	Pts
9	Ajaccio	38	14	12	12	37	41	−4	54
10	Angers	38	13	14	11	39	35	+4	53
11	SC Bastia	38	14	9	15	45	46	−1	49 (Note: Bastia have been deducted two points by the Discipline Commission following an incident away to Libourne-Saint-Seurin on September 14, 2007.)
12	Guingamp	38	11	15	12	41	37	+4	48
13	Stade Reims	38	12	10	16	44	52	−8	46

Source: Ligue 2

=== Results summary ===
Overall								Home						Away					
Pld	W	D	L	GF	GA	GD	Pts	W	D	L	GF	GA	GD	W	D	L	GF	GA	GD
38	14	9	15	45	46	−1	51	7	5	7	22	16	+6	7	4	8	23	30	−7

Last updated: 23 June 2012.
Source: lfp.fr

=== Results by round ===
Round	1	2	3	4	5	6	7	8	9	10	11	12	13	14	15	16	17	18	19	20	21	22	23	24	25	26	27	28	29	30	31	32	33	34	35	36	37	38
Ground	H	A	A	H	A	H	A	H	A	H	A	H	A	H	A	H	A	H	A	H	H	A	H	A	H	A	H	A	H	A	H	A	H	A	H	A	H	A
Result	L	W	L	W	L	L	W	D	W	D	W	W	W	D	D	W	D	L	D	W	W	W	L	W	L	D	L	L	L	W	L	L	D	W	L	D	L	L
Position	19	10	15	8	15	16	11	14	8	8	8	4	3	4	5	4	5	7	8	8	6	4	4	4	4	4	5	6	9	6	9	9	9	7	11	10	10	11

W = Win; D = Draw; L = Loss

=== Matches ===
Date	Opponent	H / A	Result	Goal(s)	Attendance	Referee
27 July 2007	Le Havre	H	0 - 2	-	3,766	Cédric Cotrel
3 August 2007	Clermont	A	2 - 3	Jau 60', Ben Saada 69', F. Mendy 90+4'	5,911	Éric Poulat
13 August 2007	Brest	A	3 - 1	F. Mendy 59' (pen.)	8,041	Jérôme Auroux
17 August 2007	Gueugnon	H	1 - 0	Pentecôte 5', Barthélémy (red card) 79'	3,449	Philippe Malige
24 August 2007	Troyes	A	2 - 0		8,172	Alexandre Castro
3 September 2007	Nantes	H	0 - 1	-	3,260	Laurent Duhamel
14 September 2007	Libourne	A	2 - 4	Ghisolfi (yellow card) 38' (yellow-red card) , Licata 47', Lorenzi 64' (pen.), Ben Saada 87', 90+2'	1,964	Nicolas Rainville
21 September 2007	Grenoble	H	0 - 0	-	2,293	Julian Grelot
28 September 2007	Niort	A	1 - 3	Barthélémy 22', Méniri 32', André 90+1'	6,497	Olivier Thual
2 October 2007	Dijon	H	0 - 0	-	2,382	Hervé Piccirillo
5 October 2007	Guingamp	A	0 - 1	Ben Saada 83'	7,968	Didier Falcone
19 October 2007	Boulogne	H	4 - 0	André 30', Harek 44', Barthélémy 49', Licata 85'	2,282	Philippe Chat
26 October 2007	Ajaccio	A	1 - 3	Jau 14', André 60', 82'	4,353	Stéphane Bré
3 November 2007	Montpellier	H	1 - 1	André (yellow card) 19' (yellow-red card) , Ben Saada 51'	3,394	Alexandre Castro
6 November 2007	Amiens	A	1 - 1	Pentecôte 49', Méniri (yellow card) 88' (yellow-red card)	8,504	Julian Grelot
9 November 2007	Sedan	H	3 - 1	Ben Saada 27', 79', Jau 43'	2,687	Tony Chapron
30 November 2007	Châteauroux	A	1 - 1	Jau 41'	5,515	Philippe Chat
7 December 2007	Angers	H	0 - 1	-	2,632	Stéphane Djiouzi
1 April 2008	Reims	A	1 - 2	Pentecôte 6', 20'	6,310	Dominique Fraise
11 January 2008	Clermont	H	0 - 0	-	2,578	Bruno Ruffray
18 January 2008	Brest	H	4 - 0	Pentecôte 22', 72', 77', 90'	2,491	Stéphane Moulin
25 January 2008	Gueugnon	A	0 - 1	André 47' (pen.)	2,505	Jérôme Auroux
8 February 2008	Troyes	H	1 - 0	Licata 6'	4,027	Didier Falcone
18 February 2008	Nantes	A	2 - 0		22,618	Pascal Viléo
22 February 2008	Libourne	H	2 - 1	Licata 27', Bridonneau (yellow card) 69' (yellow-red card) , Camara 89'	3,094	Éric Poulat
29 February 2008	Grenoble	A	1 - 0	-	13,357	Gérald Grégoire
7 March 2008	Niort	H	2 - 2	André 25', Pentecôte 52'	2,185	Lionel Jaffredo
14 March 2008	Dijon	A	2 - 1	André 52'	5,160	Gaël Lecellier
21 March 2008	Guingamp	H	0 - 1	-	2,070	Stéphane Lannoy
28 March 2008	Boulogne	A	2 - 0	Goda (red card) 41'	4,772	Alexandre Castro
5 April 2008	Ajaccio	H	0 - 1	-	4,465	Antony Gautier
10 April 2008	Montpellier	A	2 - 1	André 76' (pen.)	7,081	Clément Turpin
22 April 2008	Amiens	H	1 - 0	Ben Saada 89'	1,989	Pascal Viléo
19 April 2008	Sedan	A	0 - 0	-	8,532	Bruno Coué
25 April 2008	Châteauroux	H	1 - 3	Pentecôte 46', Allegro 90+1' (o.g.)	Closed	Jérôme Auroux
2 May 2008	Angers	A	1 - 1	Pentecôte 34'	9,710	Tony Chapron
12 May 2008	Reims	H	1 - 2	Pentecôte 58'	1,971	Gérald Grégoire
16 May 2008	Le Havre	A	6 - 0	-	15,896	Wilfried Bien

== Coupe de France ==
Date	Round	Opponent	H / A	Result	Goal(s)	Attendance	Referee
25 November 2007	7th tour	Thiers	A	[ 1 - 2]	Barthélémy 25', Ben Saada 56'	?	Abdelali Chaoui
15 December 2007	8th tour	Colomiers	A	[ 0 - 1]	Jau 32'	2,500	Julian Grelot
5 January 2008	End of 64	Viry-Châtillon	A	[ 2 - 5]	Barthélémy 16', Licata 22', André 50', Pentecôte 71', Ben Saada 81' (pen.)	2,000	Lionel Jaffredo
2 February 2008	End of 32	Auxerre	H	[ 3 - 0]	André 6' (pen.), 16', Coulibaly 12'	5,000	Damien Ledentu
18 March 2008	End of 16	Paris SG	A	[ 2 - 1]	André 22'	20,000	Tony Chapron

== Coupe de la Ligue ==
Date	Round	Opponent	H / A	Result	Goal(s)	Attendance	Referee
28 August 2007	Second tour	Laval	A	3 - 1	Cahuzac 32'	3,641	Dominique Fraise

== Statistics ==
=== Top scorers ===
As of 24 June 2012

Place	Position	Nation	Name	Ligue 2	Coupe de France	Coupe de la Ligue	Total
1	FW	(France)	Xavier Pentecôte	12	1	0	13
2	FW	(France)	Pierre-Yves André	8	4	0	12
3	FW	(Tunisia)	Chaouki Ben Saada	8	2	0	10
4	MF	(France)	Alexandre Licata	4	1	0	5
=	MF	(France)	Fabrice Jau	4	1	0	5
6	MF	(France)	Serisay Barthélémy	2	2	0	4
7	MF	(Senegal)	Frédéric Mendy	2	0	0	2
8	DF	(France)	Hassoun Camara	1	0	0	1
=	DF	(Algeria)	Mehdi Méniri	1	0	0	1
=	DF	(Algeria)	Féthi Harek	1	0	0	1
=	DF	(France)	Grégory Lorenzi	1	0	0	1
=	DF	(Ivory Coast)	Kafoumba Coulibaly	0	1	0	1
=	MF	(France)	Gary Coulibaly	0	1	0	1
=	MF	(France)	Yannick Cahuzac	0	0	1	1

=== League top assists ===
As of 24 June 2012

Place	Position	Nation	Name	Assists
1	MF	(Tunisia)	Chaouki Ben Saada	7
=	FW	(France)	Pierre-Yves André	7
3	MF	(France)	Alexandre Licata	3
4	FW	(France)	Xavier Pentecôte	2
=	MF	(France)	Yannick Cahuzac	2
=	DF	(Algeria)	Mehdi Méniri	2
=	DF	(France)	Damien Bridonneau	2
8	MF	(France)	Fabrice Jau	1
=	MF	(France)	Serisay Barthélémy	1
=	MF	(Senegal)	Frédéric Mendy	1
=	MF	(France)	Florent Ghisolfi	1
