= 2009–10 SC Bastia season =

SC Bastia
2009–10 season
- Chairman: Julien Lolli
- Manager: Philippe Anziani; Michel Padovani (caretaker and from 26 November 2009); Faruk Hadžibegić (from 10 December 2009)
- Stadium: Stade Armand Cesari
- Ligue 2: 20th (Relegated to Chmp. Nat.)
- Coupe de France: 7. round
- Coupe de la Ligue: 1. tour
- Top goalscorer: League: Pierre-Yves André (14); All: Pierre-Yves André (14)
- Highest home attendance: 5,682 vs Vannes (4 May 2010)
- Lowest home attendance: 2,013 vs Le Havre (23 October 2009)
- Average home league attendance: 2,836
Home colours	Away colours

French football club SC Bastia's 2009–10 season. Finished 20th place in league and relegated to Championnat National. Top scorer of the season, including 14 goals in 14 league matches have been Pierre-Yves André. Was eliminated to Coupe de France 7. round, the Coupe de la Ligue was able to be among the 1. tour.

== Transfers ==
=== In ===
Pos.	Name	From
Summer
DF	(France) Johan Martial	(France) Bastia B
FW	(France) Jean-Jacques Rocchi	(France) Bastia B
GK	(France) Dominique Agostini	(France) Bastia B
DF	(Benin) Khaled Adénon	(France) Le Mans
FW	(Algeria) Salim Arrache	(France) Marseille
DF	(Ivory Coast) Hassan Lingani	(France) US Albi
Winter
FW	(France) Alexandre Garcia	(France) Consolat Marseille
DF	(France) Grégory Lorenzi	(France) Brest
MF	(Mauritius) Jacques-Désiré Périatambée	(France) Dijon
MF	(France) Mathieu Robail	(France) Dijon
FW	(France) Xavier Pentecôte	(France) Toulouse

=== Out ===
Pos.	Name	To
Summer
FW	(France) Ludovic Genest	(France) Laval
FW	(Burkina Faso) Henoc Conombo	(France) Chambéry
DF	(France) Arnaud Maire	Free
GK	(Nigeria) Austin Ejide	Free
MF	(France) Jean-François Grimaldi	(France) Toulon
FW	(Senegal) Frédéric Mendy	(Greece) Kavala
DF	(Ivory Coast) Issoumaila Dao	Free
MF	(France) Nicolas Marin	(France) Lorient
FW	(Algeria) Abdelmalek Cherrad	(France) Arles
Winter
DF	(Tunisia) Yamen Ben Zekri	(Qatar) Al-Shamal
DF	(Algeria) Mehdi Méniri	Free
FW	(Algeria) Salim Arrache	Free
DF	(Ivory Coast) Hervé Kambou	Free
DF	(Ivory Coast) Hassan Lingani	(Switzerland) Young Boys

== Squad ==
As of 29 May 2012

Note: Flags indicate national team as defined under FIFA eligibility rules; some limited exceptions apply. Players may hold more than one non-FIFA nationality.

No.	Pos.	Nation	Player
1	GK	BRA	Macedo Novaes
2	DF	BEN	Khaled Adénon (on loan from Le Mans)
4	MF	MRI	Jacques-Désiré Périatambée
5	DF	SRB	Darko Dunjić
6	MF	FRA	Gauthier Mahoto
7	MF	TUN	Wahbi Khazri
8	MF	FRA	Yohan Gomez
9	FW	FRA	Xavier Pentecôte (on loan from Toulouse)
10	MF	FRA	Jean-Jacques Rocchi
11	FW	FRA	Alexandre Garcia
12	MF	FRA	Serisay Barthélémy
13	MF	FRA	Salim Moizini
14	DF	FRA	Johan Martial
15	MF	FRA	Mathieu Robail
16	GK	CMR	Jules Goda

No.	Pos.	Nation	Player
17	FW	CIV	Guy-Roland Niangbo
18	MF	FRA	Yannick Cahuzac
19	FW	FRA	Christophe Gaffory
20	FW	FRA	Pierre-Yves André (captain)
21	DF	ALG	Féthi Harek
22	MF	FRA	Soni Mustivar
24	MF	FRA	Florent Ghisolfi
25	MF	CIV	Hervé Kambou
26	MF	FRA	Fabrice Jau
27	DF	FRA	Éric Cubilier
28	DF	FRA	Bryan M'Bango
29	DF	FRA	Grégory Lorenzi (on loan from Brest)
30	GK	FRA	Dominique Agostini
40	GK	FRA	Thomas Vincensini

== Ligue 2 ==
=== League table ===
Pos	Team	Pld	W	D	L	GF	GA	GD	Pts	Promotion or Relegation
16	Châteauroux	38	10	14	14	50	54	−4	44	
17	Istres	38	11	11	16	34	52	−18	44	
18	Guingamp (R)	38	9	16	13	35	40	−5	43	Originally relegated to 2010-11 Championnat de France Amateur but instead relegated to Championnat National (Note: On 15 June 2010, following a review of each club's administrative and financial accounts in the Championnat National, the DNCG ruled that both Bastia and Gueugnon would be relegated to the Championnat de France amateur, while Amiens, Guingamp, and Strasbourg were having its accounts subjected to further deliberation to determine whether each club could retain its professional status. Both Bastia and Gueugnon had the option to appeal the decision. On 25 June 2010, the Corsican Assembly and the General Council of Haute-Corse approved grants of €800,000 and €150,000 to be given to Bastia in order for the club to meet the DNCG's financial requirements, which would allow the club to remain in the Championnat National. However, on 6 July, the DNCG remained firm on its stance relegating the club to the fourth division after questioning the legitimacy of the grants and the sale of the club's training center. Bastia president, Julien Lolli, remained confident that the club would play in the Championnat National and issued an appeal to the CNOSF, the National Sporting Committee of France, the same day. On 2 July, the DNCG announced that Gueugnon would remain in National after the club successfully appealed to the organisation. On 16 July, the CNOSF ruled against the DNCG and announced that Bastia should play in the Championnat National. The club's place in the league was confirmed upon the release of the league table. On 2 July, local media in Alsace reported that Strasbourg were on the verge of being relegated to the Championnat de France amateur by the DNCG due to financial issues. The club responded by announcing its willingness to appeal if the news reported was confirmed. With the club's accounts still being reviewed, Strasbourg's financial issues were slightly alleviated after the sale of striker Magaye Gueye to English club Everton for €1.4 million. Strasbourg later transferred captain Guillaume Lacour and Algerian international Yacine Bezzaz to Évian and Troyes, respectively, for nominal fees. On 16 July, the report was confirmed when the DNCG officially relegated Strasbourg to the CFA. Strasbourg appealed the decision the following week. On 22 July, Strasbourg's appeal was successful with the DNCG ruling in favour of a return to National. The return of Strasbourg to National means that twenty-one clubs competed in the 2010–11 edition of the league.)
19	Strasbourg (R)	38	9	15	14	42	49	−7	42	Originally relegated to 2010-11 Championnat de France Amateur but instead relegated to Championnat National
20	Bastia (R)	38	10	9	19	40	48	−8	39	Originally relegated to 2010-11 Championnat de France Amateur but instead relegated to Championnat National

Source: Ligue 2
Rules for classification: 1) points; 2) goal difference; 3) number of goals scored.
(R) Relegated

=== Results summary ===
Overall								Home						Away					
Pld	W	D	L	GF	GA	GD	Pts	W	D	L	GF	GA	GD	W	D	L	GF	GA	GD
38	10	9	19	40	48	−8	39	9	4	6	31	19	+12	1	5	13	9	29	−20

Last updated: 29 May 2012.
Source: lfp.fr

=== Results by round ===
Round	1	2	3	4	5	6	7	8	9	10	11	12	13	14	15	16	17	18	19	20	21	22	23	24	25	26	27	28	29	30	31	32	33	34	35	36	37	38
Ground	A	H	H	A	H	A	H	A	H	A	H	A	H	A	H	A	H	A	H	A	A	H	A	H	A	H	A	H	A	H	A	H	A	H	A	H	A	H
Result	L	L	W	L	L	L	D	D	L	L	D	L	W	L	D	L	L	L	W	L	L	W	D	L	L	D	D	W	L	W	W	W	L	W	D	L	D	W
Position	16	19	13	17	17	18	19	19	19	20	20	20	19	20	20	20	20	20	20	20	20	20	20	20	20	20	20	20	20	20	20	20	20	20	20	20	20	20

Source: lfp.fr
A = Away; H = Home; W = Win; D = Draw; L = Loss

=== Matches ===
Date	Opponent	H / A	Result	Goal(s)	Attendance	Referee
7 August 2009	Istres	A	2 - 0		2,211	Jérôme Auroux
14 August 2009	Caen	H	1 - 2	Gaffory 48'	3,897	Pascal Viléo
18 August 2009	Nîmes	H	6 - 1	Gaffory 3', 19', 55', André 59' (pen.), Adénon 63', Guy Niangbo 65', Meniri (red card) 90+5'	3,355	Alexandre Castro
24 August 2009	Metz	A	1 - 0		8,033	Stéphane Lannoy
28 August 2009	Laval	H	0 - 1		2,831	Wilfried Bien
11 September 2009	Dijon	A	1 - 0		6,016	Stéphane Djiouzi
18 September 2009	Nantes	H	1 - 1	Gaffory 25'	2,697	Jérôme Auroux
25 September 2009	Guingamp	A	1 - 1	André 27' (pen.)	8,392	Stéphane Lannoy
2 October 2009	Châteauroux	H	0 - 1		2,409	Christian Guillard
16 October 2009	Arles	A	1 - 0		2,937	Yohann Rouinsard
23 October 2009	Le Havre	H	1 - 1	André 24' (pen.)	2,013	Philippe Kalt
27 October 2009	Sedan	A	1 - 0		7,045	Bertrand Layec
30 October 2009	Ajaccio	H	1 - 0	André 50'	4,272	Damien Ledentu
6 November 2009	Angers	A	2 - 0	Cahuzac (yellow card) 61' (yellow-red card) , Adénon (yellow card) 76' (yellow-red card)	6,284	Cédric Cotrel
27 November 2009	Brest	H	1 - 1	Khazri 1'	2,294	Olivier Husset
1 December 2009	Strasbourg	A	2 - 1	Gaffory 56'	10,391	Yohann Rouinsard
4 December 2009	Clermont	H	1 - 3	Harek 56'	2,973	Abdelali Chaoui
18 December 2009	Vannes	A	3 - 0		3,066	Amaury Delerue
22 December 2009	Tours	H	3 - 1	Khazri 8', Gaffory 41', Guy Niangbo 90+1'	2,044	Bartolomeu Varela
15 January 2010	Caen	A	1 - 0		10,356	Cédric Cotrel
19 January 2010	Nîmes	A	2 - 1	André 10'	6,871	Philippe Chat
29 January 2010	Metz	H	1 - 0	André 84'	2,451	Sébastien Desiage
5 February 2010	Laval	A	1 - 1	André 84'	5,365	Fredy Fautrel
12 February 2010	Dijon	H	3 - 4	Pentecôte 8', André 45+2' (pen.), 78'	2,474	Bartolomeu Varela
19 February 2010	Nantes	A	3 - 1	Pentecôte 16'	11,703	Bertrand Layec
26 February 2010	Guingamp	H	0 - 0		2,472	Nicolas Rainville
5 March 2010	Châteauroux	A	2 - 2	André 36' (pen.), Pentecôte 37'	6,441	Sébastien Desiage
12 March 2010	Arles	H	3 - 0	Pentecôte 13', 53', André 66'	2,426	Ludovic Rémy
19 March 2010	Le Havre	A	3 - 1	M. Robail 73'	7,863	Bruno Coué
26 March 2010	Sedan	H	2 - 0	Pentecôte 14', 45+1'	2,372	Stéphane Djiouzi
2 April 2010	Ajaccio	A	0 - 1	André 36' (pen.)	4,654	Stéphane Bré
9 April 2010	Angers	H	3 - 1	Pentecôte 42', 52', André 90+3'	4,514	Philippe Chat
16 April 2010	Brest	A	4 - 0		9,311	William Lavis
23 April 2010	Strasbourg	H	1 - 0	Khazri (red card) 87', Pentecôte 89'	Closed	Antony Gautier
30 April 2010	Clermont	A	0 - 0		8,101	Nicolas Rainville
4 May 2010	Vannes	H	1 - 2	Pentecôte 44'	5,682	Jean-Charles Cailleux
7 May 2010	Tours	A	0 - 0		5,759	Stéphane Djiouzi
14 May 2010	Istres	H	2 - 0	André 2', Pentecôte 69'	2,708	Damien Ledentu

== Coupe de France ==
Date	Round	Opponent	H / A	Result	Goal(s)	Attendance	Referee
22 November 2009	7th tour	US Marignane	A	1 - 0		1,000	David Mussotte

== Coupe de la Ligue ==
Date	Round	Opponent	H / A	Result	Goal(s)	Attendance	Referee
1 August 2009	First tour	Metz	A	1 - 0		6,137	Olivier Husset

== Statistics ==
=== Top scorers ===
As of 29 May 2012

Place	Position	Nation	Name	Ligue 2	Coupe de France	Coupe de la Ligue	Total
1	FW	(France)	Pierre-Yves André	14	0	0	14
2	FW	(France)	Xavier Pentecôte	12	0	0	12
3	FW	(France)	Christophe Gaffory	7	0	0	7
4	FW	(Ivory Coast)	Nassa Guy Roland Niangbo	2	0	0	2
=	FW	(Tunisia)	Wahbi Khazri	2	0	0	2
6	MF	(France)	Mathieu Robail	1	0	0	1
=	DF	(Benin)	Khaled Adénon	1	0	0	1
=	DF	(Algeria)	Féthi Harek	1	0	0	1

=== League top assists ===
As of 29 May 2012

Place	Position	Nation	Name	Assists
1	MF	(France)	Fabrice Jau	7
2	MF	(France)	Mathieu Robail	5
3	FW	(France)	Pierre-Yves André	3
4	FW	(Ivory Coast)	Nassa Guy Roland Niangbo	2
=	DF	(Serbia)	Darko Dunjić	2
=	MF	(Tunisia)	Wahbi Khazri	2
7	FW	(France)	Alexandre Garcia	1
=	FW	(France)	Xavier Pentecôte	1
=	DF	(France)	Grégory Lorenzi	1
=	MF	(Algeria)	Salim Arrache	1
=	MF	(France)	Florent Ghisolfi	1
=	DF	(Algeria)	Féthi Harek	1
