= 2004–05 SC Bastia season =

SC Bastia
2004–05 season
- Chairman: Louis Multari
- Manager: François Ciccolini; Michel Padovani and Éric Durand (from April 2005)
- Stadium: Stade Armand Cesari
- Ligue 1: 19th (Relegated to Ligue 2)
- Coupe de France: End of 64
- Coupe de la Ligue: End of 16
- Top goalscorer: League: Youssouf Hadji (7); All: Youssouf Hadji (7)
- Highest home attendance: 8,598 vs Ajaccio (21 August 2004)
- Lowest home attendance: 3,644 vs Caen (27 November 2004)
- Average home league attendance: 5,213
Home colours	Away colours

French football club SC Bastia's 2004–05 season. Finished 19th place in league and relegated to Ligue 2. Top scorer of the season, including 7 goals in 7 league matches have been Youssouf Hadji. Was eliminated to Coupe de France end of 64, the Coupe de la Ligue was able to be among the final 16 teams.

== Transfers ==
=== In ===
Pos.	Name	From
Summer
MF	(Mali) Djibril Sidibé	(France) Châteauroux
MF	(France) Tony Vairelles	(France) Rennes
FW	(France) Pierre-Yves André	(France) Guingamp
MF	(France) Fabrice Jau	(France) St. Étienne
MF	(France) David Sauget	(France) Besançon
DF	(Norway) Bjørn Tore Kvarme	(Spain) Real Sociedad
MF	(France) Romain Rocchi	(France) Paris SG
Winter
FW	(Algeria) Abdelmalek Cherrad	Free
DF	(Switzerland) Bernt Haas	(England) West Bromwich
MF	(France) Stéphane Ziani	(Switzerland) Servette
DF	(France) Christian Karembeu	(Switzerland) Servette

=== Out ===
Pos.	Name	To
Summer
MF	(France) Frédéric Mendy	(France) Montpellier
DF	(Brazil) Vitorino Hilton	(France) Lens
DF	(Guinea) Morlaye Soumah	Retired
MF	(France) Jocelyn Gourvennec	(France) Angers
MF	(France) Benoît Cauet	(Bulgaria) CSKA Sofia
DF	(France) Alou Diarra	(France) Lens
FW	(Nigeria) Bartholomew Ogbeche	(France) Paris SG
MF	(France) Philippe Delaye	Free
FW	(France) Florian Maurice	(France) Istres
Winter
DF	(Norway) Bjørn Tore Kvarme	(Norway) Rosenborg
DF	(United States) Greg Vanney	(United States) Dallas FC

== Squad ==
As of 26 May 2012

Note: Flags indicate national team as defined under FIFA eligibility rules; some limited exceptions apply. Players may hold more than one non-FIFA nationality.

No.	Pos.	Nation	Player
1	GK	(France) FRA	Nicolas Penneteau
2	DF	(Cameroon) CMR	Alex Song
3	DF	(United States) USA	Greg Vanney
4	DF	(France) FRA	Cédric Uras
5	DF	(Switzerland) SUI	Bernt Haas
6	MF	(France) FRA	Stéphane Ziani
7	DF	(Norway) NOR	Bjørn Tore Kvarme
7	MF	(France) FRA	Romain Rocchi
8	MF	(France) FRA	Sébastien Piocelle
9	FW	(France) FRA	Frédéric Née
10	FW	(France) FRA	Tony Vairelles
11	FW	(Morocco) MAR	Youssouf Hadji
12	DF	(France) FRA	Christian Karembeu
13	DF	(France) FRA	Pascal Chimbonda
14	FW	(Burkina Faso) BFA	Henoc Conombo

No.	Pos.	Nation	Player
15	DF	(France) FRA	Yannick Cahuzac
16	GK	(Ivory Coast) CIV	Daniel Yeboah
17	MF	(France) FRA	Franck Matingou
18	MF	(Mali) MLI	Djibril Sidibé
19	FW	(Algeria) ALG	Abdelmalek Cherrad
20	FW	(France) FRA	Pierre-Yves André
21	DF	(Algeria) ALG	Anthar Yahia
23	DF	(France) FRA	David Sauget
24	MF	(France) FRA	Florent Ghisolfi
26	MF	(France) FRA	Fabrice Jau
27	MF	(Cameroon) CMR	Paul Essola
28	DF	(New Caledonia) NCL	Benjamin Longue
29	MF	(Tunisia) TUN	Chaouki Ben Saada
30	GK	(France) FRA	Jean-Louis Leca
33	MF	(France) FRA	Gary Coulibaly

== Ligue 1 ==
=== League table ===
Pos	Team	Pld	W	D	L	GF	GA	GD	Pts	Qualification or relegation
16	Metz	38	10	14	14	33	45	−12	44	
17	Nantes	38	10	13	15	33	38	−5	43	
18	Caen (R)	38	10	12	16	36	60	−24	42	Relegation to Ligue 2
19	Bastia (R)	38	11	8	19	32	48	−16	41	Relegation to Ligue 2
20	Istres (R)	38	6	14	18	25	51	−26	32	Relegation to Ligue 2

Source: Ligue 1
Rules for classification: 1) points; 2) goal difference; 3) number of goals scored.
(R) Relegated

=== Results summary ===
Overall								Home						Away					
Pld	W	D	L	GF	GA	GD	Pts	W	D	L	GF	GA	GD	W	D	L	GF	GA	GD
38	11	8	19	32	48	−16	41	10	4	5	24	19	+5	1	4	14	8	29	−21

Source: LFP

=== Results by round ===
Round	1	2	3	4	5	6	7	8	9	10	11	12	13	14	15	16	17	18	19	20	21	22	23	24	25	26	27	28	29	30	31	32	33	34	35	36	37	38
Ground	H	A	H	A	H	A	H	A	H	A	H	A	H	H	A	H	A	H	A	H	A	H	A	H	A	H	A	H	A	H	A	A	H	A	H	A	H	A
Result	W	D	W	D	W	D	L	L	L	L	D	L	D	L	L	W	L	L	L	D	L	W	L	D	D	L	L	W	L	W	L	L	W	W	W	L	W	L
Position	3	6	5	5	4	4	7	8	11	12	15	16	15	17	18	17	17	17	18	18	19	17	19	19	19	19	19	18	19	19	19	19	19	18	18	19	18	19

Source: LFP
A = Away; H = Home; W = Win; D = Draw; L = Loss

=== Matches ===
Date	Opponent	H / A	Result	Goal(s)	Attendance	Referee
7 August 2004	Strasbourg	H	2 - 1	Jau 43', Vairelles 81'	6,714	Thierry Auriac
14 August 2004	Nantes	A	1 - 1	André 74'	27,654	Bruno Derrien
21 August 2004	Ajaccio	H	1 - 0	Jau 69', Yahia (yellow card) 83' (yellow-red card)	8,598	Claude Colombo
27 August 2004	Nice	A	1 - 1	Vairelles 79'	9,649	Laurent Duhamel
11 September 2004	Auxerre	H	1 - 0	Yahia 32'	5,817	Stéphane Lannoy
18 September 2004	Lyon	A	0 - 0		33,826	Damien Ledentu
22 September 2004	Bordeaux	H	1 - 4	Née 32', Sidibé (red card) 63'	5,719	Bertrand Layec
25 September 2004	Marseille	A	1 - 0		50,753	Stéphane Moulin
2 October 2004	Paris SG	H	1 - 2	Hadji 17'	7,164	Gilles Veissière
16 October 2004	Lille	A	2 - 1	Ben Saada 21'	13,102	Fredy Faturel
24 October 2004	Sochaux	H	1 - 1	Sidibé 40'	4,669	Pascal Garibian
30 October 2004	Metz	A	2 - 0		15,087	Laurent Duhamel
6 November 2004	Rennes	H	1 - 1	Jau 39'	5,018	Olivier Thual
13 November 2004	St. Étienne	H	0 - 3		4,756	Bruno Derrien
20 November 2004	Toulouse	A	1 - 0		15,526	Philippe Malige
27 November 2004	Caen	H	2 - 0	Sidibé 8', Vairelles 58'	3,644	Patrick Lhermite
4 December 2004	Istres	A	1 - 0	André (red card) 71'	5,027	Bruno Ruffray
11 December 2004	AS Monaco	H	0 - 2		4,618	Philippe Kalt
18 December 2004	Lens	A	2 - 1	Vairelles 83'	34,186	Stéphane Moulin
12 January 2005	Nantes	H	0 - 0		3,770	Bruno Ruffray
15 January 2005	Ajaccio	A	1 - 0		3,799	Damien Ledentu
22 January 2005	Nice	H	2 - 0	Née 18', Hadji 86'	4,135	Éric Poulat
26 January 2005	Auxerre	A	4 - 1	Née 8'	5,988	Thierry Auriac
1 February 2005	Lyon	H	1 - 1	Uras (red card) 46', Chimbonda 48'	4,419	Laurent Duhamel
5 February 2005	Bordeaux	A	0 - 0		19,476	Stéphane Moulin
19 February 2005	Marseille	H	0 - 1		6,591	Bertrand Layec
26 February 2005	Paris SG	A	1 - 0		0	Claude Colombo
5 March 2005	Lille	H	3 - 1	Hadji 21', Ziani 27', Rocchi 39'	3,720	Hervé Piccirillo
12 March 2005	Sochaux	A	1 - 0		13,127	Tony Chapron
19 March 2005	Metz	H	1 - 0	Yahia 89'	4,253	Patrick Lhermite
2 April 2005	Rennes	A	1 - 0		23,343	Stéphane Moulin
9 April 2005	St. Étienne	A	3 - 0		31,395	Philippe Malige
16 April 2005	Toulouse	H	2 - 1	André 20', 52'	4,729	Tony Chapron
23 April 2005	Caen	A	0 - 1	André 56'	19,601	Bruno Coué
7 May 2005	Istres	H	2 - 0	Jau 51', Hadji 85'	5,017	Fredy Faturel
14 May 2005	AS Monaco	A	5 - 2	Hadji 2', Chimbonda 57', Penneteau (red card) 89'	9,878	Bruno Derrien
21 May 2005	Lens	H	3 - 1	Hadji 13', 35', Chimbonda 58', Rocchi (red card) 89'	5,702	Hervé Piccirillo
28 May 2005	Strasbourg	A	2 - 0		17,731	Olivier Thual

== Coupe de France ==
Date	Round	Opponent	H / A	Result	Goal(s)	Attendance	Referee
End of 64	8 January 2005	Sochaux	A	[ 1 - 0]	Rocchi 44' (o.g.)	6,916	Dominique Fraise

== Coupe de la Ligue ==
Date	Round	Opponent	H / A	Result	Goal(s)	Attendance	Referee
End of 32	9 November 2004	Metz	A	1 - 2	Jau 94', Vairelles 105'	9,668	Damien Ledentu
End of 16	21 December 2004	Lens	H	0 - 1		1,556	Gilles Veissière

== Statistics ==
=== Top scorers ===
As of 26 May 2012

Place	Position	Nation	Name	Ligue 1	Coupe de France	Coupe de la Ligue	Total
1	FW	(Morocco)	Youssouf Hadji	7	0	0	7
2	FW	(France)	Tony Vairelles	4	0	1	5
=	MF	(France)	Fabrice Jau	4	0	1	5
4	FW	(France)	Pierre-Yves André	4	0	0	4
5	FW	(France)	Frédéric Née	3	0	0	3
=	DF	(France)	Pascal Chimbonda	3	0	0	3
7	MF	(Mali)	Djibril Sidibé	2	0	0	2
=	DF	(Algeria)	Anthar Yahia	2	0	0	2
9	MF	(Morocco)	Chaouki Ben Saada	1	0	0	1
=	MF	(France)	Stéphane Ziani	1	0	0	1
=	MF	(France)	Romain Rocchi	1	0	0	1

=== League top assists ===
As of 26 May 2012

Place	Position	Nation	Name	Assists
1	MF	(France)	Romain Rocchi	6
2	DF	(Algeria)	Anthar Yahia	3
3	DF	(France)	David Sauget	2
=	MF	(France)	Fabrice Jau	2
=	FW	(France)	Frédéric Née	2
=	FW	(France)	Pierre-Yves André	2
7	DF	(France)	Pascal Chimbonda	1
=	DF	(Cameroon)	Alex Song	1
=	MF	(Mali)	Djibril Sidibé	1
=	FW	(Morocco)	Youssouf Hadji	1
=	MF	(France)	Stéphane Ziani	1
=	FW	(France)	Tony Vairelles	1
