= 2003–04 OGC Nice season =

Nice
2003–04 season
- President: Maurice Cohen
- Head coach: Gernot Rohr
- Stadium: Stade du Ray
- Ligue 1: 11th
- Coupe de France: Round of 32
- Coupe de la Ligue: Quarter-finals
- Top goalscorer: League: Lilian Laslandes (10); All: Christophe Meslin (11)
- Average home league attendance: 11,912

The 2003–04 season was the 100th season in the existence of OGC Nice and the club's second consecutive season in the top-flight of French football. In addition to the domestic league, Nice participated in this season's editions of the Coupe de France and Coupe de la Ligue.

== Players ==
=== First-team squad ===
Squad at end of season

Note: Flags indicate national team as defined under FIFA eligibility rules; some limited exceptions apply. Players may hold more than one non-FIFA nationality.

No.	Pos.	Nation	Player
2	DF	FRA	Cédric Varrault
3	DF	FRA	José Cobos
4	MF	COD	Jean-Paul Kalala
5	MF	BRA	Everson
6	MF	FRA	Éric Roy
7	FW	ALG	Abdelmalek Cherrad (Note: Cherrad was born in La Tronche, France, but also qualified to represent Algeria internationally and made his international debut for Algeria in 2003.)
8	DF	FRA	Noé Pamarot
9	FW	FRA	Lilian Laslandes
10	FW	ITA	Marco Simone
11	FW	CIV	Georges Ba
12	FW	GER	Bakary Diakité (Note: Diakité was born in Frankfurt, West Germany (now Germany), but also qualified to represent Mali internationally and would make his international debut for Mali in 2008.)
13	DF	FRA	Jacques Abardonado
14	MF	FRA	Romain Pitau

No.	Pos.	Nation	Player
16	GK	FRA	Bruno Valencony
17	DF	MLI	Sammy Traoré (Note: Traoré was born in Créteil, France, but also qualified to represent Mali internationally and made his international debut for Mali in 2001.)
18	MF	FRA	Olivier Echouafni
19	MF	ALG	Madjid Ben Haddou
20	DF	BEL	Philippe Léonard
21	DF	FRA	Sébastien Gimenez
23	DF	FRA	Thibault Scotto
24	GK	FRA	Damien Gregorini
25	FW	FRA	Christophe Meslin
26	FW	FRA	Johan Audel (Note: Audel was born in Nice, France, but also qualified to represent Martinique internationally and would make his international debut for Martinique in 2016.)
27	MF	FRA	Yoann Bigné
28	DF	FRA	Oumar Bakari
30	GK	FRA	Hilaire Muñoz

=== Left club during season ===
Note: Flags indicate national team as defined under FIFA eligibility rules; some limited exceptions apply. Players may hold more than one non-FIFA nationality.

No.	Pos.	Nation	Player
10	MF	CIV	Serge Dié (on loan to Metz)
20	FW	FRA	Cédric Mionnet (on loan to Sedan)

No.	Pos.	Nation	Player
22	DF	SEN	Alcaly Camara (to Dakar UC)

== Pre-season and friendlies ==
Win Draw Loss

== Competitions ==
=== Overview ===
Competition	First match	Last match	Starting round	Final position	Record							
Competition	First match	Last match	Starting round	Final position	Pld	W	D	L	GF	GA	GD	Win %
Ligue 1	2 August 2003	23 May 2004	Matchday 1	2nd	38	11	17	10	42	39	+3	28.95
Coupe de France	3 January 2004	25 January 2004	Round of 64	Round of 32	2	1	1	0	1	0	+1	50.00
Coupe de la Ligue	28 October 2003	14 January 2004	Third round	Quarter-finals	3	1	1	1	3	4	−1	33.33
UEFA Intertoto Cup	5 July 2003	26 July 2003	Second round	Third round	4	1	1	2	4	5	−1	25.00
Total					47	14	20	13	50	48	+2	29.79

Source: Competitions

=== Ligue 1 ===
==== League table ====
Pos	Team	Pld	W	D	L	GF	GA	GD	Pts	Qualification or relegation
9	Rennes	38	14	10	14	56	44	+12	52	
10	Lille	38	14	9	15	41	41	0	51	Qualification to Intertoto Cup third round
11	Nice	38	11	17	10	42	39	+3	50	Qualification to Intertoto Cup second round
12	Bordeaux	38	13	11	14	40	43	−3	50	
13	Strasbourg	38	10	13	15	43	50	−7	43	

Source: Ligue 1
Rules for classification: 1) points; 2) goal difference; 3) number of goals scored.

==== Results summary ====
Overall								Home						Away					
Pld	W	D	L	GF	GA	GD	Pts	W	D	L	GF	GA	GD	W	D	L	GF	GA	GD
38	11	17	10	42	39	+3	50	8	7	4	24	13	+11	3	10	6	18	26	−8

Source: Ligue 1

==== Results by round ====
Round	1	2	3	4	5	6	7	8	9	10	11	12	13	14	15	16	17	18	19	20	21	22	23	24	25	26	27	28	29	30	31	32	33	34	35	36	37	38
Ground	A	H	A	H	A	H	H	A	H	A	H	A	H	A	H	A	H	A	H	A	H	A	H	A	A	H	A	H	A	H	A	H	A	H	A	H	A	H
Result	W	W	D	D	L	W	W	L	D	D	D	L	W	D	D	D	W	D	W	D	L	D	W	L	W	D	D	W	D	L	L	L	L	L	D	D	W	D
Position	2	1	2	5	6	4	3	4	6	7	7	12	8	10	9	9	8	8	7	7	9	8	7	9	8	8	8	8	7	9	9	9	10	11	12	12	12	11

Source: Ligue 1
A = Away; H = Home; W = Win; D = Draw; L = Loss

==== Matches ====
2 August 2003 1	Auxerre	1–2	Nice	Auxerre
20:00 CEST (UTC+2)		Report		Stadium: Stade de l'Abbé-Deschamps

9 August 2003 2	Nice	1–0	Sochaux	Nice
20:00 CEST (UTC+2)		Report		Stadium: Stade du Ray

16 August 2003 3	Le Mans	1–1	Nice	Le Mans
20:00 CEST (UTC+2)		Report		Stadium: Stade Léon-Bollée

23 August 2003 4	Nice	2–2	Ajaccio	Nice
20:00 CEST (UTC+2)		Report		Stadium: Stade du Ray

31 August 2003 5	Lens	1–0	Nice	Le Mans
18:30 CEST (UTC+2)		Report		Stadium: Lens

13 September 2003 6	Nice	1–0	Nantes	Nice
20:00 CEST (UTC+2)		Report		Stadium: Stade du Ray

20 September 2003 7	Nice	2–0	Lille	Nice
20:00 CEST (UTC+2)		Report		Stadium: Stade du Ray

27 September 2003 8	Marseille	2–1	Nice	Marseille
20:00 CET (UTC+1)		Report		Stadium: Stade Vélodrome

4 October 2003 9	Nice	0–0	Strasbourg	Nice
20:00 CEST (UTC+2)		Report		Stadium: Stade du Ray

18 October 2003 10	Rennes	0–0	Nice	Rennes
20:00 CET (UTC+1)		Report		Stadium: Stade de la Route de Lorient

25 October 2003 11	Nice	0–0	Bordeaux	Nice
20:00 CEST (UTC+2)		Report		Stadium: Stade du Ray

1 November 2003 12	Lyon	5–0	Nice	Lyon
17:15 CET (UTC+1)		Report		Stadium: Stade de Gerland

8 November 2003 13	Nice	2–0	Bastia	Nice
17:15 CEST (UTC+2)		Report		Stadium: Stade du Ray

23 November 2003 14	Paris Saint-Germain	0–0	Nice	Paris
20:45 CET (UTC+1)		Report		Stadium: Parc des Princes

29 November 2003 15	Nice	1–1	Metz	Nice
20:00 CET (UTC+1)		Report		Stadium: Stade du Ray

7 December 2003 17	Nice	2–1	Montpellier	Nice
18:00 CET (UTC+1)		Report		Stadium: Stade du Ray

13 December 2003 18	Toulouse	1–1	Nice	Toulouse
20:00 CET (UTC+1)		Report		Stadium: Stade de Toulouse

20 December 2003 19	Nice	2–0	Guingamp	Nice
20:00 CET (UTC+1)		Report		Stadium: Stade du Ray

10 January 2004 20	Sochaux	0–0	Nice	Sochaux
20:00 CET (UTC+1)		Report		Stadium: Stade Auguste Bonal

17 January 2004 21	Nice	0–1	Le Mans	Nice
20:00 CET (UTC+1)		Report		Stadium: Stade du Ray

21 January 2004 16	Monaco	1–1	Nice	Monaco
18:00 CET (UTC+1)		Report		Stadium: Stade Louis II

31 January 2004 22	Ajaccio	1–1	Nice	Ajaccio
20:00 CET (UTC+1)		Report		Stadium: Stade François Coty

7 February 2004 23	Nice	4–0	Lens	Nice
20:00 CET (UTC+1)		Report		Stadium: Stade du Ray

14 February 2004 24	Nantes	3–1	Nice	Nantes
20:00 CET (UTC+1)		Report		Stadium: Stade de la Beaujoire

21 February 2004 25	Lille	1–2	Nice	Lille
20:00 CET (UTC+1)		Report		Stadium: Stade Grimonprez-Jooris

29 February 2004 26	Nice	0–0	Marseille	Nice
18:00 CET (UTC+1)		Report		Stadium: Stade du Ray

6 March 2004 27	Strasbourg	2–2	Nice	Strasbourg
20:00 CET (UTC+1)		Report		Stadium: Stade de la Meinau

13 March 2004 28	Nice	3–1	Rennes	Nice
20:00 CET (UTC+1)		Report		Stadium: Stade du Ray

20 March 2004 29	Bordeaux	1–1	Nice	Bordeaux
20:00 CET (UTC+1)		Report		Stadium: Stade Chaban-Delmas

27 March 2004 30	Nice	0–1	Lyon	Nice
20:00 CET (UTC+1)		Report		Stadium: Stade du Ray

3 April 2004 31	Bastia	2–1	Nice	Furiani
20:00 CEST (UTC+2)		Report		Stadium: Stade Armand Cesari; Referee: Claude Colombo

10 April 2004 32	Nice	1–2	Paris Saint-Germain	Nice
20:00 CEST (UTC+2)		Report		Stadium: Stade du Ray; Referee: Laurent Duhamel

24 April 2004 33	Metz	1–0	Nice	Metz
20:00 CEST (UTC+2)		Report		Stadium: Stade Saint-Symphorien

30 April 2004 34	Nice	1–2	Monaco	Nice
20:30 CEST (UTC+2)		Report		Stadium: Stade du Ray

8 May 2004 35	Montpellier	2–2	Nice	Montpellier
20:00 CEST (UTC+2)		Report		Stadium: Stade de la Mosson

12 May 2004 36	Nice	1–1	Toulouse	Nice
20:30 CEST (UTC+2)		Report		Stadium: Stade du Ray

15 May 2004 37	Guingamp	1–2	Nice	Guingamp
20:00 CEST (UTC+2)		Report		Stadium: Stade de Roudourou

23 May 2004 38	Nice	1–1	Auxerre	Nice
20:00 CEST (UTC+2)		Report		Stadium: Stade du Ray

=== Coupe de France ===
3 January 2004 Round of 64	Moulins	0–1	Nice	Moulins
18:30 CET (UTC+1)			Traoré 15'	Stadium: Hector-Rolland stadium Attendance: 3,500; Referee: Dominique Fraise

25 January 2004 Round of 32	Toulouse	0–0 (a.e.t.) (5–4 p)	Nice	Toulouse
15:00 CET (UTC+1)				Stadium: Stade de Toulouse; Attendance: 11,410; Referee: Bertrand Layec

=== Coupe de la Ligue ===
28 October 2003 Third round	Ajaccio	2–2 (a.e.t.) (1–4 p)	Nice	Ajaccio
20:00 CET (UTC+1)	Diomède 2' (pen.); Moracchini 115'		Meslin 60'; Bigné 113'	Stadium: Stade François Coty; Attendance: 1,413; Referee: Laurent Duhamel

17 December 2003 Round of 16	Nice	1–0	Metz	Nice
19:00 CET (UTC+1)	Meslin 78'			Stadium: Stade du Ray; Attendance: 7,026; Referee: Damien Ledentu

14 January 2004 Quarter-finals	Saint-Étienne	2–0	Nice	Saint-Étienne
21:00 CET (UTC+1)	Jau 32'; Lilian 53' (pen.)			Stadium: Stade Geoffroy Guichard; Attendance: 15,194; Referee: Alain Sars
