= Djibril Sidibé =

Djibril Sidibé may refer to:

- Djibril Sidibé (footballer, born 1982), Malian footballer
- Djibril Sidibé (footballer, born 1992), French footballer
