= Yannick Cahuzac =

French footballer (born 1985)

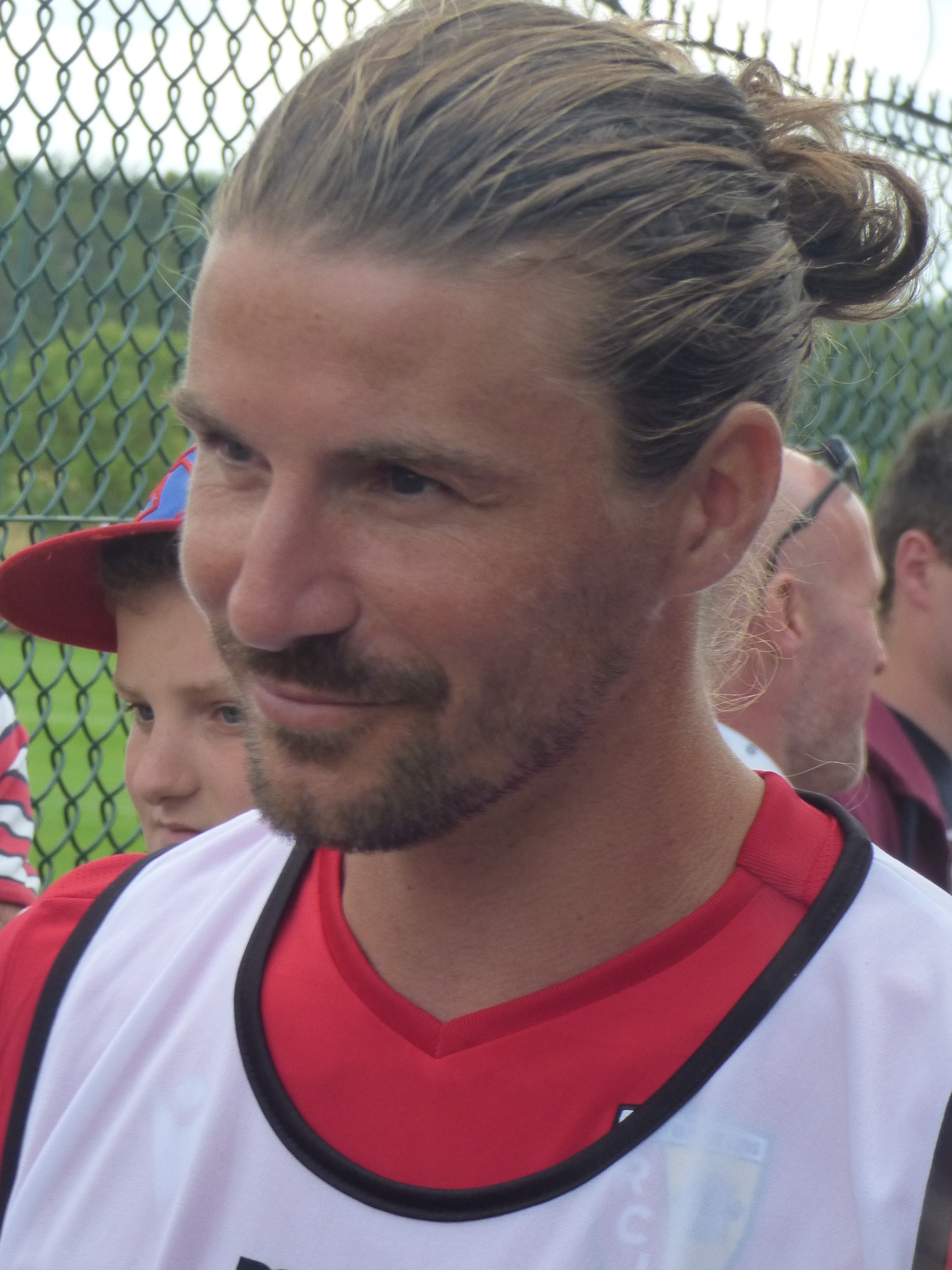
- Cahuzac with Lens in 2019

Personal information
- Date of birth: 18 January 1985 (age 41)
- Place of birth: Ajaccio, Corsica, France
- Height: 1.78 m (5 ft 10 in)
- Position: Defensive midfielder

Youth career
- –2002: Gazélec Ajaccio
- 2002–2005: Bastia

Senior career*
Years	Team	Apps	(Gls)
2005–2017	Bastia	304	(6)
2013	Bastia B	1	(0)
2017–2019	Toulouse	43	(1)
2019–2022	Lens	71	(1)
Total		419	(8)

International career
2009–2019	Corsica	5	(1)

Managerial career
- 2026: Lens
- * Club domestic league appearances and goals

Yannick Cahuzac (born 18 January 1985) is a Corsican former professional footballer who played as a defensive midfielder. He was most recently the manager of Ligue 1 club Lens. In his career, he played for Bastia, Toulouse, and Lens.

He is the grandson of international footballer and coach Pierre Cahuzac.

== Playing career ==
In July 2017, Cahuzac joined Toulouse from Bastia on a free transfer, agreeing to a two-year contract.

In May 2019, it was reported that Cahuzac would be moving to Lens in the summer having agreed a two-year contract. Due to his Toulouse contract running out he would sign on a free transfer.

On 10 May 2022, Cahuzac announced his retirement at the end of the 2021–22 season.

== Managerial career ==
On 15 September 2026, Cahuzac was announced as Lens interim manager. On 17 September, just two days after being announced as interim manager, he was appointed on a permanent basis.

On 4 November, Lens oversaw a 9-1 home defeat to Como 1907, the heaviest loss ever suffered by a French club in European competition.

He was laid off on 10 November, two days after a 2-1 defeat to Olympique de Marseille.

== Career statistics ==
Appearances and goals by club, season and competition
Club	Season	League			Coupe de France		Coupe de la Ligue		Total	
Club	Season	Division	Apps	Goals	Apps	Goals	Apps	Goals	Apps	Goals
Bastia	2005–06	Ligue 2	7	0	1	0			8	0
Bastia	2006–07	Ligue 2	20	1	2	0			22	1
Bastia	2007–08	Ligue 2	33	0	5	1			38	1
Bastia	2008–09	Ligue 2	28	0	1	0			29	0
Bastia	2009–10	Ligue 2	30	0	0	0			30	0
Bastia	2010–11	National	27	1	3	0	3	0	33	1
Bastia	2011–12	Ligue 2	30	0	1	0	1	0	32	0
Bastia	2012–13	Ligue 1	19	0	1	0	2	0	22	0
Bastia	2013–14	Ligue 1	29	0	2	0	1	0	32	0
Bastia	2014–15	Ligue 1	21	1	0	0	3	0	24	1
Bastia	2015–16	Ligue 1	31	2	0	0	0	0	31	2
Bastia	2016–17	Ligue 1	29	1	0	0	0	0	29	1
Bastia	Total		304	6	16	1	10	0	330	7
Bastia B	2012–13	CFA 2	1	0	—		—		1	0
Toulouse	2017–18	Ligue 1	20	0	2	0	2	0	24	0
Toulouse	2018–19	Ligue 1	23	1	2	0	1	0	26	1
Toulouse	Total		43	1	4	0	3	0	500	1
Lens	2019–20	Ligue 2	24	0	0	0	1	0	25	0
Lens	2020–21	Ligue 1	30	1	1	0	—		31	1
Lens	2021–22	Ligue 1	17	0	0	0	—		17	0
Lens	Total		71	1	1	0	1	0	73	1
Career total			419	8	21	1	14	0	454	9

== Managerial statistics ==
As of match played 8 November 2026

Managerial record by team and tenure
Team	From	To	Record							
Team	From	To	G	W	D	L	GF	GA	GD	Win %
Lens	15 September 2026	10 November 2026	9	3	0	6	10	22	−12	33.33

== Honours ==
Bastia

- Ligue 2: 2011–12
- Championnat National: 2010–11
- Coupe de la Ligue runner-up: 2014–15
