= Florian Jarjat =

French footballer (born 1980)

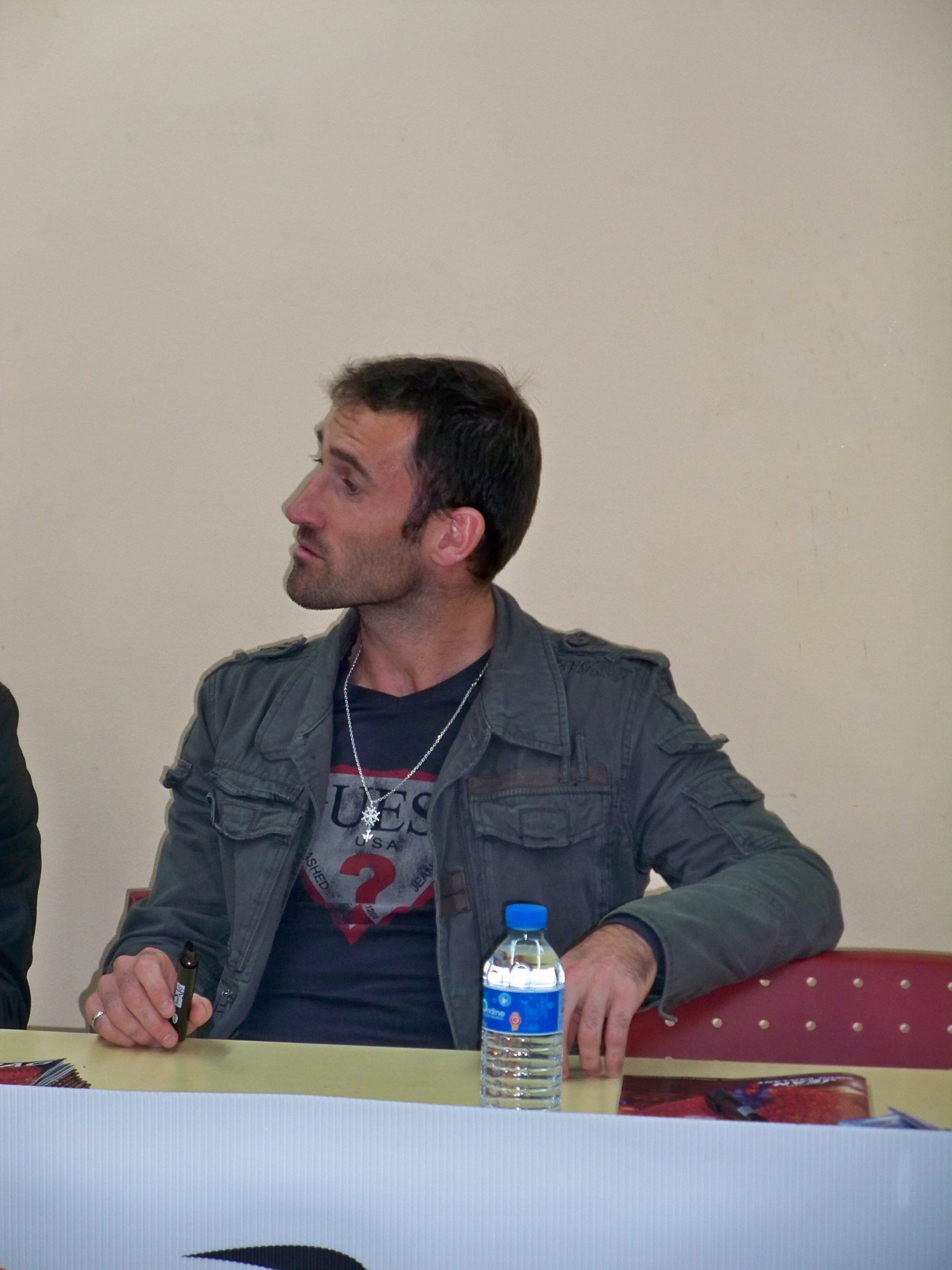
- Jarjat in September 2013

Personal information
- Date of birth: 18 February 1980 (age 46)
- Place of birth: Valence, Drôme, France
- Height: 1.81 m (5 ft 11 in)
- Position: Defender

Team information
- Current team: FCMT (head of youth)

Senior career*
| Years | Team | Apps | (Gls) |
| 1999–2004 | ASOA Valence | 60 | (3) |
| 2004–2005 | Nice | 37 | (3) |
| 2006 | Bastia | 15 | (0) |
| 2006–2009 | Dijon | 70 | (2) |
| 2009–2010 | Nantes | 32 | (1) |
| 2010–2015 | Troyes | 73 | (1) |
| Total | | 287 | (10) |

Managerial career
- 2016–2017: FCA Troyes
- * Club domestic league appearances and goals

Florian Jarjat (born 18 February 1980) is a French former professional footballer who played as a left defender. He is responsible for the youth sector of FC Métropole Troyenne.

== Career ==
Jarjat played for SC Bastia too. On 15 July 2009, FC Nantes signed the former Dijon FCO left-back on a free transfer and on a one-year deal. After just one season the 30-year-old defender left Nantes to sign a three-year deal with ES Troyes.

== Coaching career ==
Jarjat was named manager of FCA Troyes for the 2016/17 season.

In the summer 2019, the two clubs Football Club de l'Agglomération Troyennes (FCAT) and Aube Sud Vanne Pays d'Othe (ASVPO) was dissolved, and Football club de la métropole troyenne (FCMT) was born. Jarjat was hired as responsible for the youth sector for FCMT.
