= Jean-Louis Leca =

French footballer (born 1985)

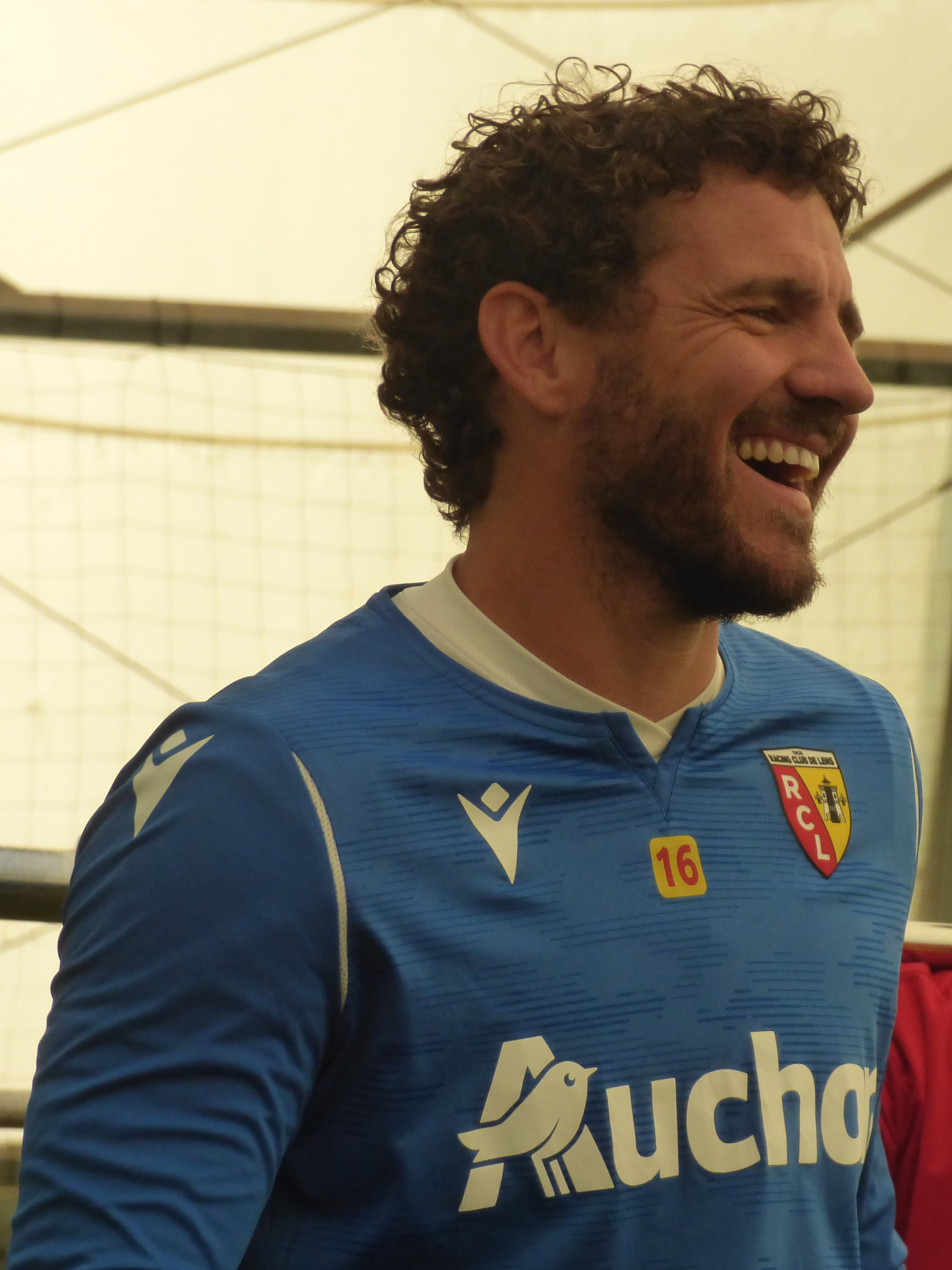
- Leca in 2020

Personal information
- Date of birth: 21 September 1985 (age 41)
- Place of birth: Bastia, France
- Height: 1.80 m (5 ft 11 in)
- Position: Goalkeeper

Youth career
- Furiani-Agliani
- Bastia

Senior career*
Years	Team	Apps	(Gls)
2003–2004	Bastia B		
2004–2008	Bastia	34	(0)
2008–2013	Valenciennes B	5+ (Note: Statistics only known for the 2011–12 and 2012–13 seasons.)	(0+)
2009–2013	Valenciennes	1	(0)
2013–2014	Bastia B	3	(0)
2013–2017	Bastia	80	(0)
2017–2018	Ajaccio	32	(0)
2018–2024	Lens	129	(0)
2024	Lens B	1	(0)
Total		285+	(0+)

International career
	Corsica	4	(0)
- * Club domestic league appearances and goals

Jean-Louis Leca (born 21 September 1985) is a French former professional footballer who played as a goalkeeper. He played for the Corsica national team.

== Club career ==
Jean-Louis Leca was trained in Corsica. He played his first Ligue 1 game with Bastia in the 2004-05 season.

He joined Valenciennes in 2008. He then went back to his former club Bastia. He joined Ajaccio in 2017, after Bastia filled for bankruptcy.

In July 2018, Leca joined French club Lens. He played his first game on 27 July 2018 against Ligue 2 club Orléans. In December 2022, he extended his contract with Lens until 2024. In May 2024, he announced his retirement at the end of the season.

When Leca played for Bastia, he followed a tradition of displaying the Corsican flag after the final whistle whenever the team won.

== Career statistics ==
Appearances and goals by club, season and competition
Club	Season	League			National cup		League cup		Europe		Other		Total	
Club	Season	Division	Apps	Goals	Apps	Goals	Apps	Goals	Apps	Goals	Apps	Goals	Apps	Goals
Bastia	2004–05	Ligue 1	2	0	0	0	0	0	—		—		2	0
Bastia	2005–06	Ligue 2	3	0	0	0	0	0	—		—		3	0
Bastia	2006–07	Ligue 2	15	0	2	0	1	0	—		—		15	0
Bastia	2007–08	Ligue 2	14	0	3	0	0	0	—		—		14	0
Bastia	Total		34	0	5	0	1	0	—		—		40	0
Valenciennes	2008–09	Ligue 1	0	0	0	0	0	0	—		—		0	0
Valenciennes	2009–10	Ligue 1	1	0	1	0	1	0	—		—		3	0
Valenciennes	2010–11	Ligue 1	0	0	0	0	0	0	—		—		0	0
Valenciennes	2012–13	Ligue 1	0	0	0	0	1	0	—		—		1	0
Valenciennes	Total		1	0	1	0	2	0	—		—		4	0
Valenciennes B	2011–12	CFA 2	2	0	—		—		—		—		2	0
Valenciennes B	2012–13	CFA 2	3	0	—		—		—		—		3	0
Valenciennes B	Total		5	0	—		—		—		—		5	0
Bastia B	2013–14	Championnat National 3	2	0	—		—		—		—		2	0
Bastia B	2014–15	Championnat National 3	1	0	—		—		—		—		1	0
Bastia B	Total		3	0	—		—		—		—		3	0
Bastia	2013–14	Ligue 1	9	0	1	0	1	0	—		—		11	0
Bastia	2014–15	Ligue 1	3	0	0	0	2	0	—		—		5	0
Bastia	2015–16	Ligue 1	34	0	1	0	0	0	—		—		35	0
Bastia	2016–17	Ligue 1	34	0	0	0	1	0	—		—		35	0
Bastia	Total		80	0	2	0	4	0	—		—		66	0
Ajaccio	2017–18	Ligue 2	33	0	0	0	0	0	—		1 (Note: Appearance in Ligue 1 relegation/promotion play-offs)	0	34	0
Lens	2018–19	Ligue 2	38	0	1	0	1	0	—		—		40	0
Lens	2019–20	Ligue 2	27	0	0	0	0	0	—		—		27	0
Lens	2020–21	Ligue 1	37	0	0	0	—		—		—		37	0
Lens	2021–22	Ligue 1	27	0	1	0	—		—		—		28	0
Lens	2022–23	Ligue 1	1	0	4	0	—		—		—		5	0
Lens	2023–24	Ligue 1	1	0	0	0	—		0	0	—		1	0
Lens	Total		131	0	6	0	1	0	0	0	—		138	0
Lens B	2023–24	CFA 2	1	0	—		—		—		—		1	0
Career total			286	0	14	0	8	0	0	0	1	0	309	0
