= Yoann Bigné =

French footballer (born 1977)

Personal information
- Date of birth: 23 August 1977 (age 49)
- Place of birth: Rennes, France
- Height: 1.68 m (5 ft 6 in)
- Position: Midfielder

Team information
- Current team: Stade Brestois
- Number: 23

Senior career*
Years	Team	Apps	(Gls)
1996–2003	Stade Rennais FC		
2002–2003	→ OGC Nice (loan)		
2003–2006	OGC Nice		
2006–2012	Stade Brestois		

International career
- France U-21
- * Club domestic league appearances and goals

Yoann Bigné (born 23 August 1977) is a retired French football player that last played for Stade Brestois.
