= Mounir Diane =

Moroccan former footballer

Personal information
- Full name: Mounir Diane
- Date of birth: 16 May 1982 (age 44)
- Place of birth: Oulad Abbou, Morocco
- Height: 1.86 m (6 ft 1 in)
- Position: Attacking midfielder

Team information
- Current team: CS Avion

Youth career
- 1998–2001: Lens

Senior career*
Years	Team	Apps	(Gls)
2001–2008	Lens B	76	(13)
2003–2008	Lens	49	(1)
2005–2006	→ Bastia (loan)	23	(1)
2009–2010	R.A.E.C. Mons	48	(4)
2010–2011	Dubai		
2011–2012	SC Douai		
2012–2013	Al Jazirah Al Hamra		
2013	Al Khaleej		
2013–2014	Al Rams		
2014–2015	Ras Al Khaima		
2015–2018	Al-Nahda		
2018–	CS Avion		

International career
2004–2006	Morocco	8	(1)
- * Club domestic league appearances and goals

Mounir Diane (born 16 May 1982) is a Moroccan former footballer who plays as an attacking midfielder for French amateur club CS Avion.
