= Franco Dolci =

Argentine football midfielder

Personal information
- Full name: Pablo Franco Dolci
- Date of birth: 1 January 1984 (age 42)
- Place of birth: Alta Gracia, Argentina
- Height: 1.76 m (5 ft 9 in)
- Position: Right winger

Team information
- Current team: Deportivo Maipú

Youth career
- 2003–2004: Matienzo

Senior career*
Years	Team	Apps	(Gls)
2004–2006	Nice	10	(0)
2006–2007	Bastia	8	(0)
2007–2008	Chacarita Juniors	35	(2)
2009–2013	Newell's Old Boys	41	(0)
2011–2012	→ Chacarita Juniors (loan)	32	(1)
2012–2013	→ Ferro Carril Oeste (loan)	26	(0)
2013–2015	Sportivo Belgrano	49	(2)
2015–2017	Independiente Rivadavia	61	(0)
2017–2019	Huracán Las Heras	48	(2)
2019–	Deportivo Maipú	8	(1)
- * Club domestic league appearances and goals as of 01:09, 4 December 2019 (UTC)

Pablo Franco Dolci (born 1 January 1984) is an Argentine professional football midfielder who plays for Deportivo Maipú in the Torneo Federal A.
