= Benjamin Longue =

New Caledonian footballer (born 1980)

Personal information
- Date of birth: 3 December 1980 (age 45)
- Place of birth: Nouméa, New Caledonia
- Height: 1.75 m (5 ft 9 in)
- Position: Defender

Senior career*
Years	Team	Apps	(Gls)
1998–2005	Bastia B	96	(2)
2002–2005	Bastia	2	(0)
2005–2008	CA Bastia	31	(0)
2008–2013	AS Magenta		

International career
2003–2011	New Caledonia	13	(0)
Medal record
Men's football
Representing New Caledonia
OFC Nations Cup
Runner-up	2008 Oceania
Pacific Games
Silver medal – second place	2003 Fiji
- * Club domestic league appearances and goals

Benjamin Longue (born 3 December 1980) is a former professional footballer who played as a defender. He played for AS Magenta in the New Caledonia Division Honneur before retiring in 2013. At international level, he represented the New Caledonia national team.

== Honours ==
New Caledonia

- OFC Nations Cup runner-up: 2008
- Pacific Games silver medalist: 2003
