= Romain Rocchi =

French footballer (born 1981)

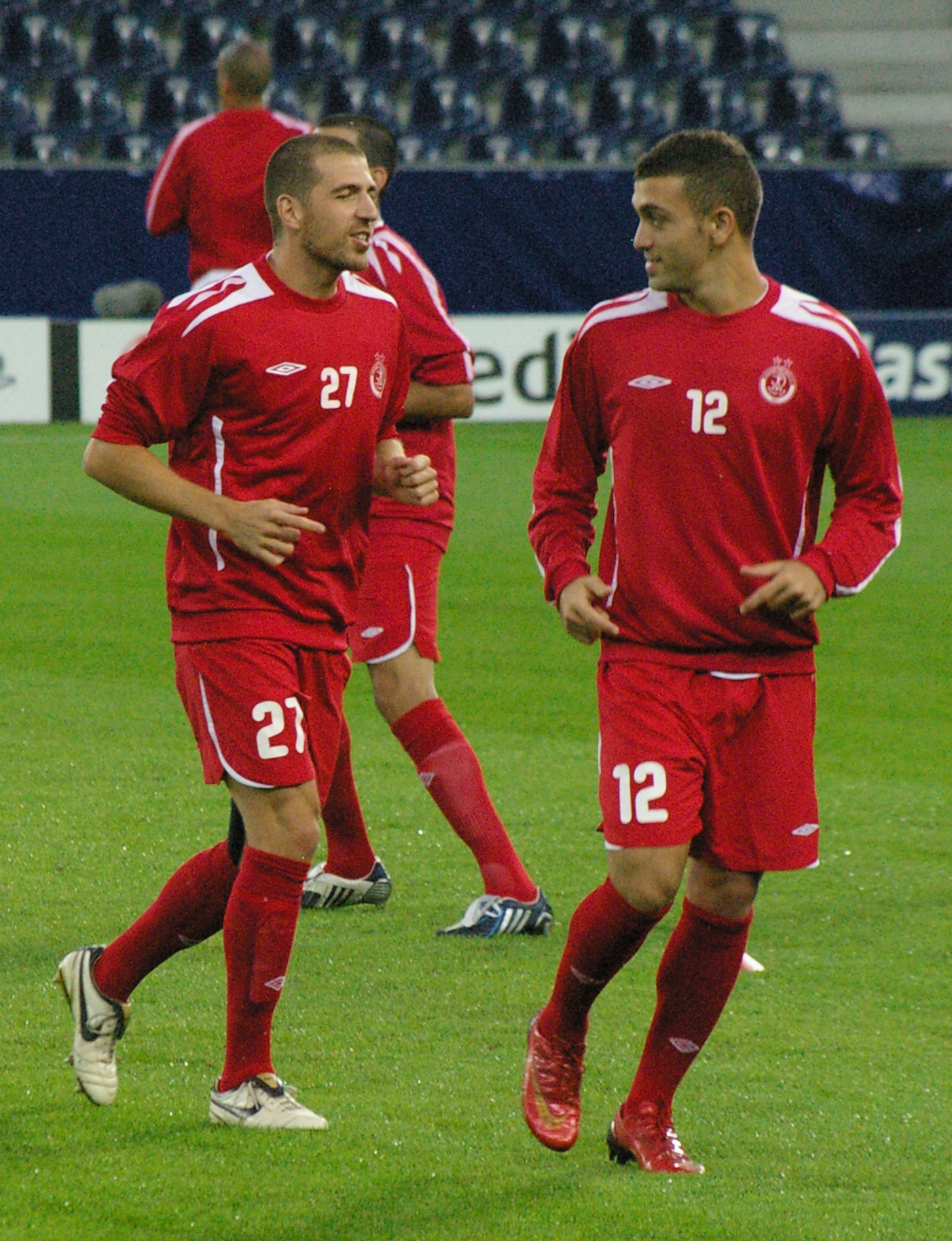
- Rocchi (left) with Victor Merey

Personal information
- Full name: Romain Rocchi
- Date of birth: 2 October 1981 (age 45)
- Place of birth: Cavaillon, France
- Height: 1.83 m (6 ft 0 in)
- Position: Midfielder

Youth career
- 1999–2001: Cannes

Senior career*
Years	Team	Apps	(Gls)
2001–2002	Cannes	17	(1)
2002–2005	Paris Saint-Germain	24	(0)
2004–2005	→ Bastia (loan)	24	(1)
2005–2008	Ajaccio	24	(3)
2008–2010	Metz	69	(6)
2010–2011	Hapoel Tel Aviv	3	(0)
2011–2013	Arles	85	(8)
2013–2015	Metz	36	(0)
2014	Metz B	1	(0)
Total		283	(19)
- * Club domestic league appearances and goals

Romain Rocchi (born 2 October 1981) is a French former professional footballer who played as a midfielder.

== Honours ==
Paris Saint-Germain

- Coupe de France: 2003–04
