= Florent Laville =

French footballer (born 1973)

Personal information
- Full name: Florent Laville
- Date of birth: 7 August 1973 (age 53)
- Place of birth: Valence, Drôme, France
- Height: 1.85 m (6 ft 1 in)
- Position: Centre-back

Youth career
- 1988–1993: Lyon

Senior career*
Years	Team	Apps	(Gls)
1993–2003	Lyon	204	(2)
2003	→ Bolton Wanderers (loan)	10	(0)
2003–2005	Bolton Wanderers	5	(0)
2004	→ Coventry City (loan)	6	(0)
2005–2007	Bastia	37	(1)
Total		262	(3)

International career
1994	France U21	3	(0)
1996	France Olympic	1	(0)
- * Club domestic league appearances and goals

Florent Laville (born 7 August 1973) is a French former professional footballer who played as a centre-back.

== Club career ==
Born in Valence, Drôme, Laville spent the first ten years of his career with Lyon, and helped them win the Ligue 1 title in 2002 and 2003 as well as the Trophée des Champions in 2002. Laville signed with Premier League club Bolton Wanderers in 2003 and instantly slotted into the first team, forming a successful defensive partnership with Guðni Bergsson, despite a sending off in a memorable game against Arsenal. He later signed permanently for Bolton, but a serious leg injury suffered several games into the 2003–04 season, against Middlesbrough, put him out of action for over a year and effectively ended his top-level playing career as he struggled to regain fitness.

After leaving Bolton at the end of the 2004–05 season, Laville eventually returned to fitness and briefly played for Coventry City before returning to France, reuniting with former Bolton teammate, Pierre-Yves André at Bastia. His contract expired at the end of the 2006–07 season and he subsequently retired.

== International career ==
Laville represented France at the 1996 Summer Olympics.

== Honours ==
Lyon

- Ligue 1: 2001–02, 2002–03
- UEFA Intertoto Cup: 1997
- Trophée des Champions: 2002
