= Pascal Camadini =

French footballer (born 1972)

Personal information
- Date of birth: 2 April 1972 (age 54)
- Place of birth: Bastia, France
- Height: 1.80 m (5 ft 11 in)
- Position: Midfielder

Senior career*
Years	Team	Apps	(Gls)
1992–1995	Bastia	95	(10)
1995–1996	Perpignan	34	(7)
1996–1997	Bastia	29	(2)
1997–1998	Sion	23	(2)
1998–1999	Lorient	32	(5)
1999–2005	Strasbourg	150	(5)
2005-2006	Bastia	43	(5)
2006–2008	Strasbourg	19	(0)
Total		425	(36)
- * Club domestic league appearances and goals

Pascal Camadini (born 2 April 1972) is a French former professional footballer who played as a midfielder. He started playing in the youth teams of SC Bastia, ending his career at Racing Strasbourg in 2008. Whilst at Strasbourg, Camadini played in the 2001 Coupe de France Final in which they beat Amiens SC on penalties.
