= David Sauget =

French footballer (born 1979)

Personal information
- Full name: David Sauget
- Date of birth: 23 November 1979 (age 46)
- Place of birth: Champagnole, France
- Height: 1.75 m (5 ft 9 in)
- Position: Defender

Youth career
- 1996–2000: Sochaux

Senior career*
Years	Team	Apps	(Gls)
2000–2001	Rouen	?	(?)
2001–2004	Besançon RC	99	(8)
2004–2006	Bastia	44	(2)
2006–2008	Nancy	81	(4)
2008–2009	Saint-Étienne	13	(0)
2009–2010	Grenoble	27	(0)
2010–2014	Sochaux	95	(1)
2014–2015	Neuchâtel Xamax	0	(0)
Total		359	(15)
- * Club domestic league appearances and goals

David Sauget (born 23 November 1979) is a French former professional footballer who played as a defender.
