= Paul Essola =

Cameroonian footballer (born 1981)

Personal information
- Full name: Paul-Hervé Essola Tchamba
- Date of birth: 13 December 1981 (age 44)
- Place of birth: Douala, Cameroon
- Height: 1.70 m (5 ft 7 in)
- Position: Midfielder

Senior career*
Years	Team	Apps	(Gls)
1998	Maritime Douala	?	(?)
1998–2006	Bastia	17	(0)
2002	→ US Créteil (loan)	13	(0)
2007	Stal Alchevsk	11	(0)
2007–2010	Arsenal Kyiv	38	(1)
2009	→ Dnipro Dnipropetrovsk (loan)	4	(0)
2011	Beijing Baxy	21	(0)
Total		104	(1)

International career
2008	Cameroon	1	(0)
- * Club domestic league appearances and goals

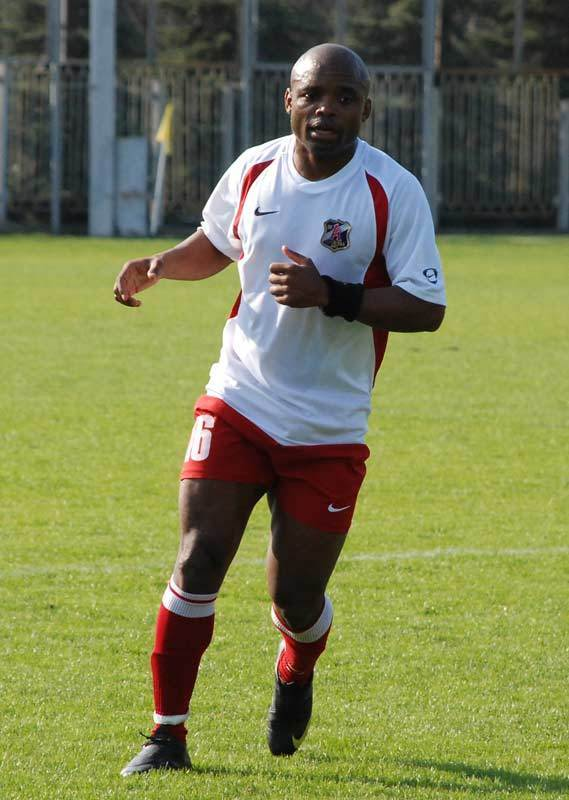
Paul Essola in 2010

Paul-Hervé Essola Tchamba (born 13 December 1981) is a Cameroonian former professional footballer who played as a midfielder. He signed for FC Arsenal Kyiv in June 2007. Essola had previously arrived in Ukraine six months previously to play for FC Stal Alchevsk, having been released by French club SC Bastia. In January 2008, he was named in the Cameroon squad for the 2008 African Cup of Nations.
