= Djibril Sidibé (footballer, born 1982) =

Malian footballer

Personal information
- Date of birth: 23 March 1982 (age 44)
- Place of birth: Bamako, Mali
- Height: 1.80 m (5 ft 11 in)
- Position: Defensive midfielder

Youth career
- Centre Salif Keita

Senior career*
Years	Team	Apps	(Gls)
1999	Centre Salif Keita	20	(5)
2000–2001	Monaco B	33	(0)
2001–2002	Monaco	12	(0)
2002–2004	→ Châteauroux (loan)	60	(3)
2004–2005	→ Bastia (loan)	32	(2)
2005–2008	Châteauroux	76	(6)
2008–2010	Sedan	56	(1)
2010–2011	Maccabi Tel Aviv	21	(2)
2012–2013	Hapoel Ramat Gan	22	(0)
2013–2014	Hapoel Ashkelon	17	(1)
2014	Red Star	8	(0)
2014	Western United		

International career
2001–2008	Mali	47	(4)
- * Club domestic league appearances and goals

Djibril Sidibé (born 23 March 1982) is a Malian former professional footballer who played as a defensive midfielder.

== Career ==
On 8 July 2010, Sidibé signed a two-year contract with Maccabi Tel Aviv after completing a successful five-day trial with the team. On 27 June 2011, he was placed on the club's transfer list. On 31 August 2011, he was officially released from his contract.

Sidibé has represented Mali at international level earning 47 caps and scoring four goals.

== Personal life ==
Sidibé acquired French nationality by naturalization in September 2009. Following his retirement from professional football, Sidibé has remained involved in football analysis. In September 2026, he spoke to AfricaFoot about the summer transfers of five Malian players, praising Mamadou Sangaré's move to Brentford, backing Aliou Dieng to establish himself at Valencia, and highlighting the potential for Moussa Yeo to develop at Swansea City.

== Honours ==
Hapoel Ramat Gan

- Israel State Cup: 2012–13

Mali

- Africa Cup of Nations fourth place: 2004
