= Christophe Gaffory =

French footballer (born 1988)

Personal information
- Date of birth: 10 May 1988 (age 38)
- Place of birth: Bastia, France
- Height: 1.81 m (5 ft 11 in)
- Position: Striker

Team information
- Current team: FC Balagne

Youth career
- 2005–2007: Bastia

Senior career*
Years	Team	Apps	(Gls)
2006–2010	Bastia	50	(9)
2010–2014	Vannes	75	(12)
2014–2016	Stade Bordelais	39	(6)
2016–2017	Borgo FC	17	(7)
2017–2018	Bastia-Borgo	12	(0)
2017–2018	Bastia-Borgo II	6	(3)
2018–	FC Balagne		

International career
2009–	Corsica	2	(1)
- * Club domestic league appearances and goals as of 10:34, 23 February 2018 (UTC)

Christophe Gaffory (born 10 May 1988) is a French professional footballer who plays as a striker for FC Balagne.

== International career ==
Gaffory represented Corsica in a game against Congo.

== Career statistics ==
Scores and results list Corsica's goal tally first, score column indicates score after each Gaffory goal.

List of international goals scored by Christophe Gaffory
No.	Date	Venue	Opponent	Score	Result	Competition
1	6 June 2009	Stade Ange Casanova, Ajaccio, Corsica	Congo	1–0	1–1	Friendly
