= Samir Bertin d'Avesnes =

Comorian footballer (born 1986)

Personal information
- Date of birth: 15 April 1986 (age 40)
- Place of birth: Moroni, Comoros
- Height: 1.78 m (5 ft 10 in)
- Position: Forward

Youth career
- 1999–2002: US Endoume Marseille

Senior career*
Years	Team	Apps	(Gls)
2002–2006	Bastia B	62	(19)
2002–2008	Bastia	25	(1)
2008–2009	Croix de Savoie Gaillard	24	(1)
2009–2011	AS Beauvais	55	(4)
2011–2013	FC Aregno-Calvi	46	(1)
2013–2016	Roye-Noyon	77	(4)
Total		289	(30)

International career
2002–2004	France U17	10	(6)
2004	France U18	20	(6)
2011	Comoros	2	(0)
- * Club domestic league appearances and goals

Samir Bertin d'Avesnes (born 15 April 1986) is a Comorian professional footballer who played as a forward.

== Club career ==
D'Avesnes was born in Moroni. He played for Ligue 2 club SC Bastia from 2002 to 2008. However, in August 2008, he resiliated his contract with SC Bastia and signed to Croix-de-Savoie. After one year with Savoie, signed in summer 2009 for AS Beauvais Oise.

== International career ==
D'Avesnes has played for the France U18 national team. He earned one cap for the Comoros senior national team.
