= Frédéric Mendy (footballer, born 1981) =

Senegalese footballer

Personal information
- Date of birth: 6 November 1981 (age 44)
- Place of birth: Dakar, Senegal
- Height: 1.66 m (5 ft 5 in)
- Position: Midfielder

Youth career
- 1997–1999: Saint-Étienne

Senior career*
Years	Team	Apps	(Gls)
1999–2006	Saint-Étienne	125	(11)
2006–2009	Bastia	90	(9)
2009–2010	Kavala	9	(1)
2010–2011	Laval	29	(0)
2011–2013	JA Drancy	44	(3)
Total		297	(24)

International career
2003–2009	Senegal	36	(1)
- * Club domestic league appearances and goals

Frédéric Mendy (born 6 November 1981) is a Senegalese former professional footballer who played as a midfielder.

== International career ==
He played for the national team at the 2006 Africa Cup of Nations, where his team took 4th place for the third time in history.
