= Mehdi Méniri =

Algerian footballer (born 1977)

Personal information
- Date of birth: 29 June 1977 (age 49)
- Place of birth: Metz, France
- Height: 1.90 m (6 ft 3 in)
- Position: Defender

Youth career
- Nancy

Senior career*
Years	Team	Apps	(Gls)
1996–2000	Nancy	96	(6)
2000–2003	Troyes	69	(4)
2003–2006	Metz	70	(5)
2006–2009	Bastia	73	(4)
2008	→ Al-Khor (loan)	26	(3)
2009	Al Dhafra	25	(3)
2010–2012	Amnéville	25	(6)
Total		384	(31)

International career
2000–2008	Algeria	23	(2)
- * Club domestic league appearances and goals

Mehdi Méniri (Arabic: مهدي منيري; born 29 June 1977) is a former professional footballer who played as a defender. Born in France, he represented Algeria at international level.

== Club career ==
Born in Metz, Méniri first played senior football for AS Nancy. He moved on to Troyes AC, with whom he played in the UEFA Cup after helping them become one of the winners of the 2001 UEFA Intertoto Cup, and in the summer of 2003 he finally went to play for FC Metz.

After three seasons with FC Metz he signed with SC Bastia in Ligue 2. At the end of the 2007–08 season, he was loaned out to Qatari club Al Khor for three months. He returned to Bastia after his loan spell.

On 31 March 2010, Méniri signed a season-long contract with Al Dhafra Club.

On 16 September 2010, it was announced that Meniri was joining French amateur side CSO Amnéville.

== International career ==
Méniri made his debut for the Algeria national team in a friendly against Bulgaria on 14 November 2000.

== Career statistics ==
Appearances and goals by national team and year
National team	Year	Apps	Goals
Algeria	2000	2	0
Algeria	2001	4	0
Algeria	2002	0	0
Algeria	2003	0	0
Algeria	2004	1	0
Algeria	2005	1	0
Algeria	2006	5	0
Algeria	2007	6	2
Algeria	2008	3	0
Total		22	3

Scores and results list Algeria's goal tally first, score column indicates score after each Méniri goal.

List of international goals scored by Mehdi Méniri
No.	Date	Venue	Opponent	Score	Result	Competition
1	7 February 2007	Stade 5 Juillet 1962, Algiers, Algeria	Libya	2–1	2–1	Friendly
2	24 March 2007	Stade 5 Juillet 1962, Algiers, Algeria	Cape Verde	2–0	2–0	2008 African Cup of Nations (qualification)

== Honours ==
Troyes

- UEFA Intertoto Cup: 2001
