= Éric Marester =

French footballer (born 1984)

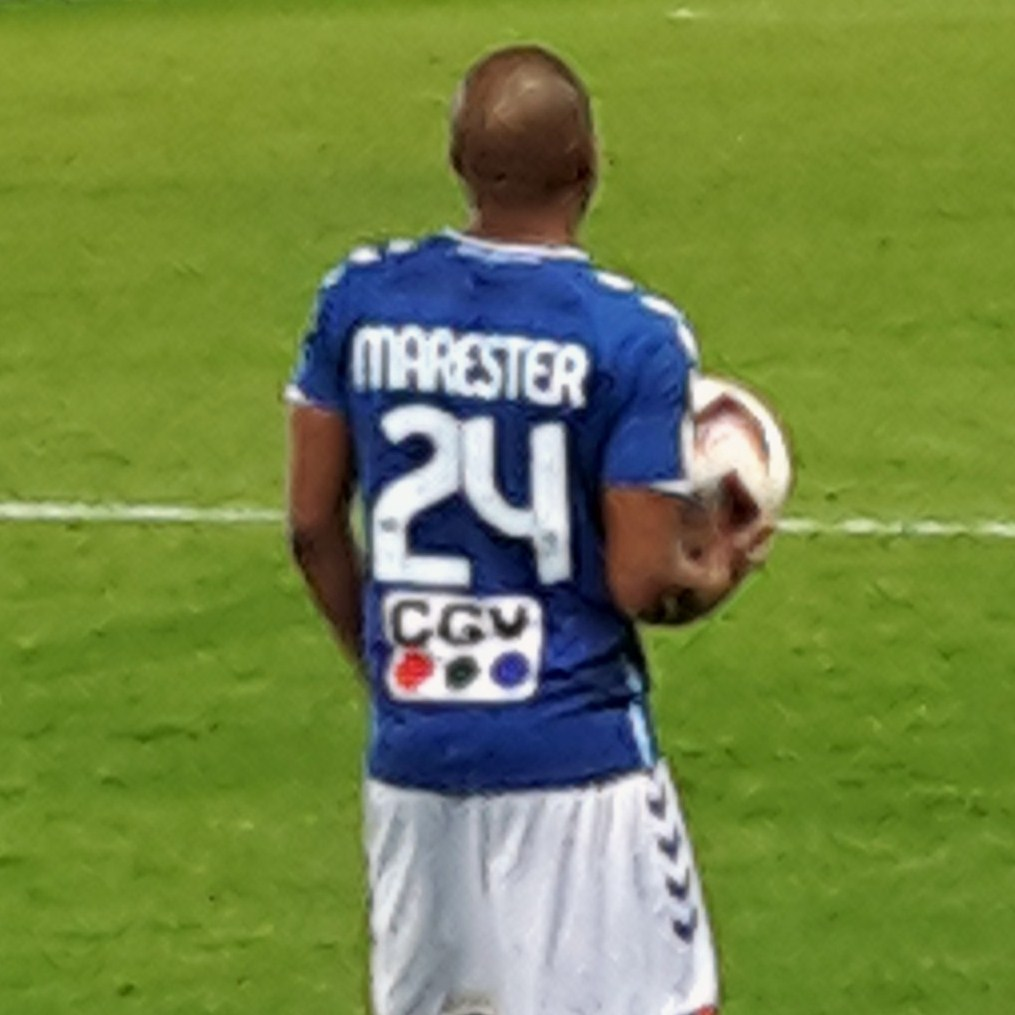
- Marester with Strasbourg

Personal information
- Date of birth: 12 June 1984 (age 42)
- Place of birth: Villeneuve-la-Garenne, France
- Height: 1.72 m (5 ft 8 in)
- Positions: Right-back; central defender

Senior career*
Years	Team	Apps	(Gls)
2001–2011	Troyes	120	(0)
2005–2007	→ Bastia (loan)	66	(1)
2011–2013	Monaco	38	(0)
2013	Arles-Avignon	6	(0)
2013–2014	Auxerre	23	(0)
2014–2015	Ajaccio	30	(0)
2015–2017	Strasbourg	57	(0)
Total		340	(1)
- * Club domestic league appearances and goals

Éric Marester (born 12 June 1984) is a French former professional footballer who played as a defender. He spent his career playing for Troyes AC over ten years including SC Bastia in the French Ligue 2, for whom he played between 2005 and 2007 on two consecutives loans.

== Career ==
On 20 July 2011, Marester signed a two-year contract with Ligue 2 side AS Monaco. He signed for Arles-Avignon in the 2012–13 season.

In July 2015, he joined Strasbourg from Ajaccio.
