= Christophe Meslin =

French footballer (born 1977)

Personal information
- Full name: Christophe Meslin
- Date of birth: 13 July 1977 (age 49)
- Place of birth: Vernon, France
- Height: 1.75 m (5 ft 9 in)
- Position: Striker

Senior career*
Years	Team	Apps	(Gls)
1999–2003	Rennes	1	(0)
2000–2001	→ Gazélec Ajaccio (loan)	36	(20)
2001–2002	→ Nice (loan)	32	(16)
2002–2003	→ Nice (loan)	9	(1)
2003–2005	Nice	35	(8)
2005–2007	Bastia	40	(16)
2007	Guingamp	7	(4)
2007–2008	Troyes	8	(2)
2009–2010	Gazélec Ajaccio	13	(6)
2010–2011	Pacy Vallée-d'Eure	31	(8)
2011–2012	RC Grasse	5	(1)
Total		217	(82)
- * Club domestic league appearances and goals

Christophe Meslin (born 13 July 1977) is a French former professional footballer who played as a striker.
