= Jules Goda =

Cameroonian footballer

Personal information
- Full name: Jules Stéphane Goda
- Date of birth: 30 May 1989 (age 37)
- Place of birth: Yaoundé, Cameroon
- Height: 1.90 m (6 ft 3 in)
- Position: Goalkeeper

Team information
- Current team: FC Montlouis

Senior career*
| Years | Team | Apps | (Gls) |
| 2007–2011 | Bastia | 7 | (0) |
| 2011 | Marseille | 0 | (0) |
| 2011–2012 | Portimonense | 7 | (0) |
| 2012–2013 | AEL | 0 | (0) |
| 2013–2016 | Gazélec Ajaccio | 9 | (0) |
| 2016 | Ajaccio B | 2 | (0) |
| 2016–2017 | Ajaccio | 13 | (0) |
| 2017–2024 | Tours | 75 | (0) |
| 2017–2018 | Tours B | 4 | (0) |
| 2024– | FC Montlouis | 2 | (0) |

International career
| 2011–2017 | Cameroon | 3 | (0) |
Medal record
Men's football
Representing Cameroon
Africa Cup of Nations
| Winner | 2017 Gabon |
- * Club domestic league appearances and goals as of 2 October 2024

Jules Stéphane Goda (born 30 May 1989) is a Cameroonian professional footballer who plays as a goalkeeper for French Championnat National 3 club FC Montlouis.

== Career ==
Goda joined Ligue 2 club Ajaccio in 2016.
