= Grégory Lorenzi =

French footballer (born 1983)

Personal information
- Full name: Grégory Lorenzi
- Date of birth: 17 December 1983 (age 42)
- Place of birth: Bastia, France
- Height: 1.86 m (6 ft 1 in)
- Position: Defender

Youth career
- –1998: Bastia
- 1998–2003: Nantes

Senior career*
Years	Team	Apps	(Gls)
2003–2005	Excelsior Mouscron	47	(2)
2005–2008	Bastia	76	(5)
2008–2013	Brest	67	(5)
2010	→ Bastia (loan)	19	(0)
2011	→ Arles-Avignon (loan)	12	(0)
2013–2014	Mons	30	(2)
2014–2015	Jahn Regensburg	19	(1)
2015–2016	Brest	30	(1)
Total		300	(16)

International career
2009–2011	Corsica	2	(0)
- * Club domestic league appearances and goals

Grégory Lorenzi (born 17 December 1983) is a French former professional football defender. During his professional career, he played in particular for Stade Brestois 29. and for SSV Jahn Regensburg. At the end of the 2015–16 season, he became sports director at Brest.

Lorenzi was appointed sporting director of Olympique de Marseille on 28 May 2026, joining the club ahead of the 2026–27 season following his departure from Stade Brestois 29. Marseille officially confirmed his appointment after weeks of reports linking him with the role, as the club underwent a restructuring of its sporting hierarchy following the departure of former sporting director Medhi Benatia.
