= Yohan Gomez =

French footballer (born 1981)

Personal information
- Date of birth: 25 September 1981 (age 45)
- Place of birth: Lyon, France
- Height: 1.74 m (5 ft 9 in)
- Position: Defender

Youth career
- 2001–2002: Lyon

Senior career*
Years	Team	Apps	(Gls)
2003–2004	Lyon	6	(0)
2005–2010	Bastia	123	(5)
2010–2012	Cannes	15	(0)
2012–2014	Vannes	22	(2)
2014–2018	Monts d'Or Azergues Foot	90	(2)
Total		256	(9)
- * Club domestic league appearances and goals

Yohan Gomez (born 25 September 1981) is a French former professional footballer who played as a defender.

Gomez began his professional football career with Lyon. However after only making a few appearances with the senior team, Gomez left for Bastia where he played for five seasons.

== Honours ==
- Ligue 1: 2003–04
