= Tony Chapron =

French football referee

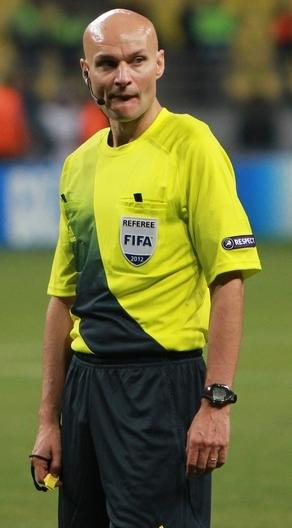
- Chapron in 2012
- Born: 23 April 1972 (age 54); Flers, Orne, France

Domestic
Years	League	Role
2006–2018	Ligue 1	Referee

International
Years	League	Role
2007–2017	FIFA listed	Referee

Tony Chapron (born 23 April 1972) is a French former football referee.

Born in Flers, Orne, Chapron took up refereeing in 1996 in conjunction with his job as an educational advisor. He became a full-time referee in 1998 and an international referee in 2007.

== Career ==
In 2007, a flare thrown by fans at a match between Lyon and Saint-Étienne resulted in police firing tear gas into the crowd, and Chapron ordered the players to retreat to the changing rooms for 20 minutes.

Prior to 2008, the only international matches he had refereed were qualifying matches, but in October 2008, Chapron took charge of the UEFA Cup first round second leg between Aston Villa and Litex Lovech; he showed two yellow cards – both to Litex players – but also awarded Litex a penalty kick. He refereed two more UEFA Cup matches in the 2008–09 season, including the Round of 32 second leg between Hamburg and NEC. In June 2009, Chapron was named as one of six UEFA referees to take charge of the 2009 UEFA Under-21 Championship in Sweden.

On 2 November 2010, Chapron took charge of his first UEFA Champions League match between Rubin Kazan and Panathinaikos; he showed three yellow cards during the game, all to Panathinaikos players.

Chapron officiated at the 2011 FIFA U-17 World Cup, as well as 2010 World Cup qualifiers.

On 14 January 2018, during a Ligue 1 match between FC Nantes and Paris Saint-Germain, Chapron attempted to kick Nantes player, Diego Carlos, following an inadvertent collision, tripping Chapron, before sending him off for a second yellow card. The next day, Chapron was suspended by the FFF and called to meet a disciplinary committee following the incident. He was suspended for six months, following which he retired as a referee and now works for French media.
