= Arnaud Maire =

French footballer (born 1979)

Personal information
- Full name: Arnaud Maire
- Date of birth: 6 March 1979 (age 47)
- Place of birth: Besançon, France
- Height: 1.81 m (5 ft 11 in)
- Position: Defender

Senior career*
Years	Team	Apps	(Gls)
2000–2005	Besançon RC	141	(4)
2005–2009	SC Bastia	102	(21)
2009–2010	RC Strasbourg	4	(1)
2010–2013	AC Ajaccio	45	(0)
2013–2014	USJA Carquefou	9	(0)
2014–2017	Besançon RC		
- * Club domestic league appearances and goals as of 1 March 2020

Arnaud Maire (born 6 March 1979) is a French football defender.

== Career ==
Maire began his professional football career with Besançon RC. He joined AC Ajaccio late in his career helping the Corsican club gain promotion to Ligue 1 during the 2010–11 season, but he spent most of his spell in Ligue 1 on the substitute's bench.
