= Serisay Barthélémy =

French footballer (born 1984)

Personal information
- Date of birth: 6 January 1984 (age 42)
- Place of birth: Le Blanc-Mesnil, France
- Height: 1.66 m (5 ft 5 in)
- Position: Midfielder

Youth career
- 2004–2005: Saint-Étienne

Senior career*
Years	Team	Apps	(Gls)
2005–2011	Bastia	111	(15)
2011	Cannes	2	(0)
2012	FC Edmonton	20	(1)
2013–2016	Borgo	18	(1)
2016–2016	ÉF Bastia		
2017	Bastia-Borgo II	1	(0)
2018–2020	Sisaket		
- * Club domestic league appearances and goals as of 28 September 2012

Serisay Barthélémy (born 6 January 1984) is a French professional footballer who plays as a midfielder.

== Career ==
A product of AS Saint-Étienne's youth system, Barthelemy never played for the club's senior side. He played over 100 competitive matches with SC Bastia before brief spells at AS Cannes and FC Edmonton.
