= Henoch Conombo =

Burkinabé footballer

Personal information
- Full name: Hénoch Théodorat Bienvenu Conombo
- Date of birth: 13 June 1986 (age 40)
- Place of birth: Ouagadougou, Burkina Faso
- Height: 1.80 m (5 ft 11 in)
- Position: Striker

Youth career
- 2001–2003: Bastia

Senior career*
Years	Team	Apps	(Gls)
2003–2009	Bastia	22	(3)
2010–2012	Chambéry		

International career
2004–2006	Burkina Faso	2	(1)
- * Club domestic league appearances and goals

Henoch Conombo (born 13 June 1986) is a Burkinabé former professional footballer who played as a striker.

== Club career ==
Born in Ouagadougou, Conombo began his career in the youth of SC Bastia and was promoted to first team in 2004.

In summer 2009 moved to fifth-tier side Chambéry SF, after being released by SC Bastia in the French Ligue 2.

== International career ==
Inside 2004 and 2006 played two games and scored one goal for Burkina Faso.
