= Florent Ghisolfi =

French football executive and former player (born 1985)

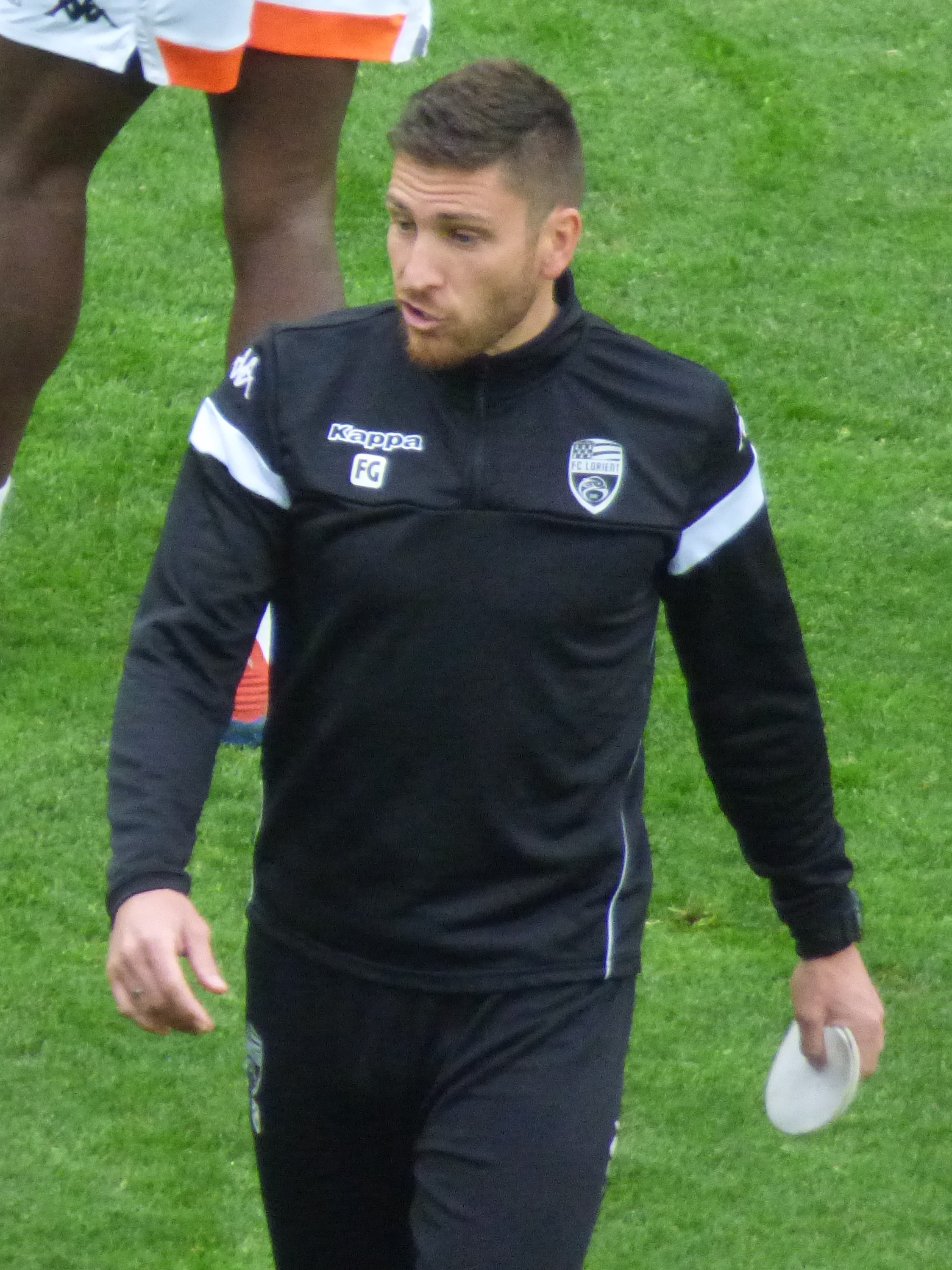
- Ghisolfi with Lorient in 2019

Personal information
- Date of birth: 28 February 1985 (age 41)
- Place of birth: Aubagne, France
- Height: 1.75 m (5 ft 9 in)
- Position: Midfielder

Team information
- Current team: Sunderland (director of football)

Senior career*
Years	Team	Apps	(Gls)
2003–2010	Bastia	94	(2)
2010–2014	Reims	48	(1)
Total		142	(3)
- * Club domestic league appearances and goals

Florent Ghisolfi (born 28 February 1985) is a French football executive and former player and coach who is currently director of football of Premier League club Sunderland.

== Executive career ==
After he retired from playing football, Ghisolfi went into club management. He became the sporting director of Ligue 1 club Lens in 2019.

In October 2022, Ghisolfi joined fellow Ligue 1 club Nice as sporting director.

On 22 May 2024, Ghisolfi signed with Serie A side Roma as their new sporting director.
