= Abdelmalek Cherrad =

Footballer (born 1981)

Personal information
- Date of birth: 14 January 1981 (age 45)
- Place of birth: La Tronche, France
- Height: 1.86 m (6 ft 1 in)
- Position: Forward

Senior career*
| Years | Team | Apps | (Gls) |
| 1998–2005 | Nice | 76 | (9) |
| 2000–2001 | → Cannes (loan) | 13 | (3) |
| 2004 | → Espérance (loan) | 0 | (0) |
| 2004 | → Gent (loan) | 5 | (2) |
| 2005 | → Bastia (loan) | 9 | (0) |
| 2005–2007 | Bastia | 21 | (7) |
| 2007–2008 | MC Alger | 10 | (2) |
| 2008–2009 | Bastia | 14 | (2) |
| 2009 | Arles-Avignon | 9 | (1) |
| 2010–2011 | Maritimo | 6 | (0) |
| 2011 | → Belenenses (loan) | 1 | (0) |
| 2012–2013 | Grenoble | 0 | (0) |
| Total | | 164 | (26) |

International career
| 2003–2007 | Algeria | 18 | (7) |
- * Club domestic league appearances and goals

Abdelmalek Cherrad (Arabic: عبدالمالك شراد; born 14 January 1981) is a former professional footballer who played as a forward. Born in France, he made 18 appearances for the Algeria national team, scoring 7 goals.

== Club career ==
Born in La Tronche, France, Cherrad began his playing career with OGC Nice in 1998. His first full season as a professional saw him make five appearances. His six and a half seasons with Nice saw him loaned out to several different sides in France and abroad. He played for the likes of AS Cannes, Espérance de Tunis, K.A.A. Gent and SC Bastia. His spell with Bastia, saw Bastia sign him in January 2005. His two and a half seasons with Bastia, saw him make twenty one appearances, scoring seven goals.

In the summer of 2007, Bastia released Cherrad. In November 2007, he signed for Algerian side MC Alger. He remained with the Algerian side for one season where in 2008 he returned to Bastia. He returned to the Les Bleus on a one-year deal. His second spell with Bastia saw him make fourteen appearances, scoring two goals.

Cherrad left Bastia in summer 2009 for newly promoted to Ligue 2 side AC Arles-Avignon. His stay was short-lived as he was released at the end of 2009. In the January transfer window he moved to Portugal to play for Maritimo. In January 2011, he was on the move again this time representing Belenenses for the latter half of the 2010–11 season. In the summer of 2011, Maritimo would release Cherrad.

In October 2012, Cherrad signed for Grenoble Foot 38.

== International career ==
Cherrad was part of the Algeria national team at the 2004 African Nations Cup which finished second in its group in the first round of competition before being defeated by Morocco in the quarter-finals. Cherrad has 18 caps and 7 goals with Algeria.

== Career statistics ==
Scores and results list Algeria's goal tally first, score column indicates score after each Cherrad goal.

List of international goals scored by Abdelmalek Cherrad
| No. | Date | Venue | Opponent | Score | Result | Competition |
|---|---|---|---|---|---|---|
| 1 | 24 April 2003 | Stade de la Licorne, Amiens, France | Madagascar | 3–0 | 3–1 | Friendly |
| 2 | 4 September 2003 | Stade Paul Audrain, Dinard, France | Qatar | 1–0 | 1–0 | Friendly |
| 3 | 14 November 2003 | Stade 5 Juillet 1962, Algiers, Algeria | Niger | 1–0 | 6–0 | 2006 FIFA World Cup qualification |
| 4 | 14 November 2003 | Stade 5 Juillet 1962, Algiers, Algeria | Niger | 2–0 | 6–0 | 2006 FIFA World Cup qualification |
| 5 | 8 February 2004 | Stade Taïeb El Mhiri, Sfax, Tunisia | Morocco | 1–0 | 1–3 | 2004 African Cup of Nations |
| 6 | 30 May 2004 | Stade 19 Mai 1956, Annaba, Algeria | Jordan | 1–1 | 1–1 | Friendly |
| 7 | 20 June 2004 | National Stadium, Harare, Zimbabwe | Zimbabwe | 1–0 | 1–1 | 2006 FIFA World Cup qualification |
