= Fabrice Jau =

French footballer (born 1978)

Personal information
- Date of birth: 4 September 1978 (age 48)
- Place of birth: Toulouse, France
- Height: 1.85 m (6 ft 1 in)
- Position: Midfielder

Youth career
- 1996–1998: Toulouse

Senior career*
Years	Team	Apps	(Gls)
1998–2001	Toulouse	67	(3)
2001–2006	Bastia	76	(14)
2002–2004	→ Saint-Étienne (loan)	53	(3)
2006–2007	Sedan	22	(0)
2007–2010	Bastia	89	(8)
2011	Toulouse Saint-Jo	12	(1)
2011–2015	Balma SC	64	(3)
Total		383	(32)

International career
1999	France U21	1	(0)
- * Club domestic league appearances and goals

Fabrice Jau (born 4 September 1978) is a French former professional footballer who played as a midfielder.
