= Pierre-Yves André =

French footballer (born 1974)

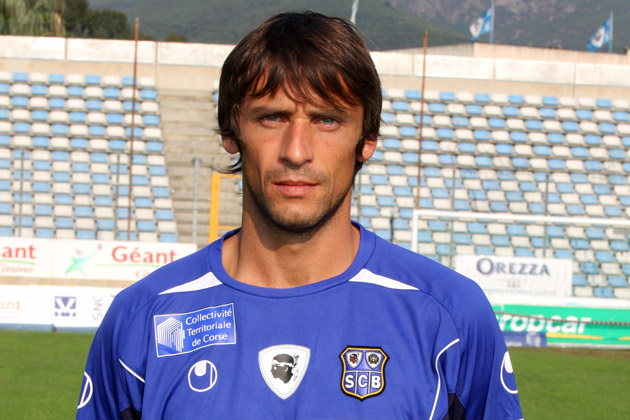
- André in 2009

Personal information
- Date of birth: 14 May 1974 (age 52)
- Place of birth: Lannion, France
- Height: 1.85 m (6 ft 1 in)
- Position: Forward

Senior career*
Years	Team	Apps	(Gls)
1992–1993	Lannion		
1993–1997	Rennes	125	(17)
1997–2001	Bastia	113	(27)
2001–2003	Nantes	32	(4)
2003	→ Bolton Wanderers (loan)	9	(0)
2003–2004	Guingamp	34	(1)
2004–2010	Bastia	180	(57)
Total		493	(106)

International career
1994–1996	France U21	9	(1)
1998	Brittany	1	(0)
1999–2001	France A'	3	(0)
- * Club domestic league appearances and goals

Pierre-Yves André (born 14 May 1974) is a French former professional footballer who played as a forward. He spent most of his career playing for Bastia, and retired after the club suffered relegation to the French third tier following the 2009–10 season. While at Nantes he won the 2001 Trophée des Champions.

In 2003, André had a six-month loan spell at the English club Bolton Wanderers and successfully helped the side stave off relegation.

== Career statistics ==
Appearances and goals by club, season and competition
Club	Season	League			Cup (Note: Includes Coupe de France and Coupe de la Ligue.)		Continental (Note: Includes UEFA Cup, UEFA Champions League and UEFA Intertoto-Cup.)		Total	
Club	Season	Division	Apps	Goals	Apps	Goals	Apps	Goals	Apps	Goals
Rennes	1993–94	Division 2	26	5	2	1	–		28	6
Rennes	1994–95	Division 1	33	5	1	0	–		34	5
Rennes	1995–96	Division 1	36	6	3	0	–		39	6
Rennes	1996–97	Division 1	30	1	5	0	–		35	1
Rennes	Total		125	17	11	1	0	0	136	18
Bastia	1997–98	Division 1	29	1	3	1	6	1	38	3
Bastia	1998–99	Division 1	22	9	2	1	5	1	29	11
Bastia	1999–00	Division 1	30	7	3	2	–		33	9
Bastia	2000–01	Division 1	32	10	4	3	–		36	13
Bastia	Total		113	27	12	7	11	2	136	36
Nantes	2001–02	Division 1	26	4	0	0	10	2	36	6
Nantes	2002–03	Ligue 1	6	0	3	1	–		9	1
Nantes	Total		32	4	3	1	10	2	45	7
Bolton (loan)	2002–03	Premier League	9	0	0	0	–		9	0
Guingamp	2003–04	Ligue 1	34	1	2	0	2	1	38	2
Bastia	2004–05	Ligue 1	21	4	2	0	–		23	4
Bastia	2005–06	Ligue 2	33	12	2	0	–		35	12
Bastia	2006–07	Ligue 2	29	9	2	1	–		31	10
Bastia	2007–08	Ligue 2	28	8	3	4	–		31	12
Bastia	2008–09	Ligue 2	34	10	1	0	–		35	10
Bastia	2009–10	Ligue 2	35	14	1	0	–		36	14
Bastia	Total		180	57	11	5	0	0	191	62
Career total			493	106	39	14	23	5	555	125
