= 2015–16 AS Nancy Lorraine season =

Nancy
2015–16 season
- President: Jacques Rousselot
- Head coach: Pablo Correa
- Stadium: Stade Marcel Picot
- Ligue 2: 1st (promoted)
- Coupe de France: Eighth round
- Coupe de la Ligue: Second round
- Top goalscorer: League: Maurice Dalé (13); All: Maurice Dalé (14)

The 2015–16 season was the 49th season in the existence of AS Nancy Lorraine and the club's third consecutive season in the second division of French football. In addition to the domestic league, Nancy participated in this season's editions of the Coupe de France and Coupe de la Ligue.

== Players ==
=== First-team squad ===
As of 2 February 2016.

Note: Flags indicate national team as defined under FIFA eligibility rules; some limited exceptions apply. Players may hold more than one non-FIFA nationality.

No.	Pos.	Nation	Player
2	DF	FRA	Clément Lenglet
3	DF	SEN	Pape Diakhaté
4	DF	FRA	Modou Diagne
6	MF	MAR	Youssef Ait Bennasser
7	MF	FRA	Antony Robic
9	FW	FRA	Maurice Dalé
10	MF	FRA	Arnaud Lusamba
11	MF	FRA	Karim Coulibaly
13	MF	URU	Jonathan Iglesias (on loan from El Tanque)
14	DF	FRA	Joffrey Cuffaut
15	FW	MAR	Youssouf Hadji

No.	Pos.	Nation	Player
16	GK	CMR	Guy N'dy Assembé
17	DF	FRA	Faitout Maouassa
18	MF	MTN	Dialo Guidileye
19	MF	FRA	Loïc Puyo
20	DF	MAR	Michaël Chrétien
21	DF	FRA	Tobias Badila
25	MF	FRA	Benoît Pedretti
26	DF	FRA	Vincent Muratori
27	FW	FRA	Alexis Busin
28	DF	FRA	Julien Cétout
30	GK	FRA	Brice Samba (on loan from Marseille)

=== Out on loan ===
Note: Flags indicate national team as defined under FIFA eligibility rules; some limited exceptions apply. Players may hold more than one non-FIFA nationality.

No. / Pos. / Nation / Player; — / GK / FRA / Quentin Beunardeau (on loan to Tubize)	No. / Pos. / Nation / Player; — / FW / FRA / Romain Bauchet (on loan to Épinal)

== Pre-season and friendlies ==
Win Draw Loss

11 July 2015 Friendly	Nancy (France)	0–0	(France) Sochaux	Vittel, France
18:00 CEST (UTC+2)

18 July 2015 Friendly	Nancy (France)	0–0	(France) Troyes	Saint-Dizier, France
18:30 CEST (UTC+2)				Stadium: Stade Charles Jacquin; Attendance: 800

24 July 2015 Friendly	Strasbourg (France)	1–1	(France) Nancy	Schiltigheim, France
19:00 CEST (UTC+2)				Attendance: 1,500; Referee: M.Moreira

== Competitions ==
=== Overview ===
Competition	First match	Last match	Starting round	Final position	Record							
Competition	First match	Last match	Starting round	Final position	Pld	W	D	L	GF	GA	GD	Win %
Ligue 2	3 August 2015	May 2016	Matchday 1	Winners	38	21	11	6	60	32	+28	55.26
Coupe de France	14 November 2015	6 December 2015	Seventh round	Eighth round	2	1	0	1	4	3	+1	50.00
Coupe de la Ligue	11 August 2015	25 August 2015	First round	Second round	2	1	1	0	2	1	+1	50.00
Total					42	23	12	7	66	36	+30	54.76

Source: Competitions

=== Ligue 2 ===
==== League table ====
Pos	Team	Pld	W	D	L	GF	GA	GD	Pts	Promotion or Relegation
1	Nancy (C, P)	38	21	11	6	60	32	+28	74	Promotion to Ligue 1
2	Dijon (P)	38	20	10	8	62	36	+26	70	Promotion to Ligue 1
3	Metz (P)	38	19	8	11	54	39	+15	65	Promotion to Ligue 1
4	Le Havre	38	19	8	11	52	37	+15	65	
5	Red Star	38	18	10	10	43	38	+5	64	

Source: Ligue 2
Rules for classification: 1) points; 2) goal difference; 3) number of goals scored; 4) head-to-head goal difference; 5) fair play points
(C) Champions; (P) Promoted

==== Results summary ====
Overall								Home						Away					
Pld	W	D	L	GF	GA	GD	Pts	W	D	L	GF	GA	GD	W	D	L	GF	GA	GD
38	21	11	6	60	32	+28	74	14	3	2	35	14	+21	7	8	4	25	18	+7

Source: Ligue 2

==== Results by round ====
Round	1	2	3	4	5	6	7	8	9	10	11	12	13	14	15	16	17	18	19	20	21	22	23	24	25	26	27	28	29	30	31	32	33	34	35	36	37	38
Ground	H	A	H	A	A	H	A	H	A	H	A	H	A	H	A	H	A	H	A	H	A	H	H	A	H	A	H	A	H	A	H	A	H	A	H	A	H	A
Result	D	W	W	D	W	D	D	L	D	W	W	W	L	W	W	W	D	W	W	W	D	L	W	D	D	D	W	L	W	L	W	D	W	W	W	L	W	W
Position	6	6	1	2	2	3	3	4	5	3	2	2	3	2	1	2	2	2	1	1	1	1	1	2	2	2	2	2	2	2	2	2	2	2	1	1	1	1

Source: Ligue 2
A = Away; H = Home; W = Win; D = Draw; L = Loss

==== Matches ====
3 August 2015 1	Nancy	0–0	Tours	Tomblaine
20:30 CET (UTC+1)		Report		Stadium: Stade Marcel Picot

7 August 2015 2	Laval	0–1	Nancy	Laval
20:00 CET (UTC+1)		Report		Stadium: Stade Francis Le Basser

15 August 2015 3	Nancy	3–0	Brest	Tomblaine
14:00 CET (UTC+1)		Report		Stadium: Stade Marcel Picot

22 August 2015 4	Nîmes	2–2	Nancy	Nîmes
14:00 CET (UTC+1)		Report		Stadium: Stade des Costières

28 August 2015 5	Clermont	1–2	Nancy	Laval
20:00 CET (UTC+1)		Report		Stadium: Stade Gabriel Montpied

11 September 2015 6	Nancy	1–1	Niort	Tomblaine
20:00 CET (UTC+1)		Report		Stadium: Stade Marcel Picot

18 September 2015 7	Metz	0–0	Nancy	Metz
20:00 CET (UTC+1)		Report		Stadium: Stade Saint-Symphorien

22 September 2015 8	Nancy	0–1	Auxerre	Tomblaine
21:00 CET (UTC+1)		Report		Stadium: Stade Marcel Picot

28 September 2015 9	Paris FC	1–1	Nancy	Paris
20:30 CET (UTC+1)		Report		Stadium: Stade Sebastien Charléty

2 October 2015 10	Nancy	3–0	Ajaccio	Tomblaine
20:00 CET (UTC+1)		Report		Stadium: Stade Marcel Picot

16 October 2015 11	Red Star	0–1	Nancy	Saint-Ouen
20:00 CET (UTC+1)		Report		Stadium: Stade Pierre Brisson

23 October 2015 12	Nancy	3–1	Bourg-en-Bresse	Tomblaine
20:00 CET (UTC+1)		Report		Stadium: Stade Marcel Picot

2 November 2015 13	Lens	1–0	Nancy	Lens
20:30 CET (UTC+1)		Report		Stadium: Stade Bollaert-Delelis

9 November 2015 14	Nancy	3–1	Dijon	Tomblaine
20:30 CET (UTC+1)		Report		Stadium: Stade Marcel Picot

20 November 2015 15	Créteil	0–3	Nancy	Créteil
20:00 CET (UTC+1)		Report		Stadium: Stade Dominique Duvauchelle

28 November 2015 16	Nancy	3–1	Le Havre	Tomblaine
14:00 CET (UTC+1)		Report		Stadium: Stade Marcel Picot

1 December 2015 17	Sochaux	2–2	Nancy	Montbéliard
21:00 CET (UTC+1)		Report		Stadium: Stade Auguste Bonal

14 December 2015 18	Nancy	1–0	Valenciennes	Tomblaine
20:30 CET (UTC+1)		Report		Stadium: Stade Marcel Picot

17 December 2015 19	Évian	0–1	Nancy	Annecy
20:30 CET (UTC+1)		Report		Stadium: Parc des Sports

8 January 2016 20	Nancy	1–0	Laval	Tomblaine
20:00 CET (UTC+1)		Report		Stadium: Stade Marcel Picot

16 January 2016 21	Brest	1–1	Nancy	Brest
14:00 CET (UTC+1)		Report		Stadium: Stade Francis-Le Blé

22 January 2016 22	Nancy	3–4	Nîmes	Tomblaine
20:00 CET (UTC+1)		Report		Stadium: Stade Marcel Picot

29 January 2016 23	Nancy	3–1	Clermont	Tomblaine
20:00 CET (UTC+1)		Report		Stadium: Stade Marcel Picot

2 February 2016 24	Niort	0–0	Nancy	Niort
21:00 CET (UTC+1)		Report		Stadium: Stade René Gaillard

5 February 2016 25	Nancy	2–2	Metz	Tomblaine
20:00 CET (UTC+1)		Report		Stadium: Stade Marcel Picot

12 February 2016 26	Auxerre	2–2	Nancy	Auxerre
20:00 CET (UTC+1)		Report		Stadium: Stade de l'Abbé-Deschamps

19 February 2016 27	Nancy	3–2	Paris FC	Tomblaine
20:00 CET (UTC+1)		Report		Stadium: Stade Marcel Picot

26 February 2016 28	Ajaccio	2–1	Nancy	Ajaccio
20:00 CET (UTC+1)		Report		Stadium: Stade François Coty

5 March 2016 29	Nancy	2–0	Red Star	Tomblaine
14:00 CET (UTC+1)		Report		Stadium: Stade Marcel Picot

11 March 2016 30	Bourg-en-Bresse	2–0	Nancy	Bourg-en-Bresse
20:00 CET (UTC+1)		Report		Stadium: Stade Marcel-Verchère

19 March 2016 31	Nancy	1–0	Lens	Tomblaine
14:00 CET (UTC+1)		Report		Stadium: Stade Marcel Picot

2 April 2016 32	Dijon	0–0	Nancy	Dijon
14:00 CEST (UTC+2)		Report		Stadium: Stade Gaston Gérard

11 April 2016 33	Nancy	1–0	Créteil	Tomblaine
20:30 CEST (UTC+2)		Report		Stadium: Stade Marcel Picot

16 April 2016 34	Le Havre	1–3	Nancy	Le Havre
14:00 CEST (UTC+2)		Report		Stadium: Stade Océane

25 April 2016 35	Nancy	1–0	Sochaux	Tomblaine
20:30 CEST (UTC+2)		Report		Stadium: Stade Marcel Picot

2 May 2016 36	Valenciennes	1–0	Nancy	Valenciennes
20:30 CEST (UTC+2)		Report		Stadium: Stade du Hainaut

6 May 2016 37	Nancy	1–0	Évian	Tomblaine
20:45 CEST (UTC+2)		Report		Stadium: Stade Marcel Picot

13 May 2016 38	Tours	2–5	Nancy	Tours
20:45 CEST (UTC+2)		Report		Stadium: Stade de la Vallée du Cher

=== Coupe de France ===
14 November 2015 First round	Dinsheim	2–4	Nancy	Molsheim
17:00 CET (UTC+1)	Ehrismann 37'; Perez 82'		Chrétien 5'; Robic 41'; Mabella 69', 76'	Stadium: Parc Des Sports Stadium; Referee: Nicolas Dzubanowski

6 December 2015 Eighth round	Sochaux	1–0 (a.e.t.)	Nancy	Montbéliard
14:15 CET (UTC+1)	Teikeu 97'			Stadium: Stade Auguste Bonal; Referee: Floris Aubin

=== Coupe de la Ligue ===
11 August 2015 First round	Nancy	2–1	Châteauroux	Tomblaine
20:00 CEST (UTC+2)	Robic 3' (pen.); Dalé 90+1'		Garita 59' (pen.)	Stadium: Stade Marcel Picot; Attendance: 1,568; Referee: François Letexier

25 August 2015 Second round	Bourg-en-Bresse	0–0 (a.e.t.) (5–4 p)	Nancy	Bourg-en-Bresse
20:00 CEST (UTC+2)				Stadium: Stade Marcel-Verchère; Attendance: 961; Referee: Jeremy Stinat
	Penalties
	Damour (penalty scored); Dimitriou (penalty scored); Diompy (penalty scored); Sané (penalty scored); Boussaha (penalty scored)		(penalty scored) Dalé; (penalty scored) Hadji; (penalty scored) Pedretti; (penalty missed) Robic; (penalty scored) Guidileye
