= 2016–17 AS Nancy Lorraine season =

AS Nancy Lorraine
2016–17 season
- Chairman: Jacques Rousselot
- Manager: Pablo Correa
- Stadium: Stade Marcel Picot
- Ligue 1: 19th (relegated)
- Coupe de France: Round of 32
- Coupe de la Ligue: Semi-finals
- Top goalscorer: Issiar Dia (8 goals)
- Highest home attendance: 19,524 vs. Paris Saint-Germain (15 October 2016)
- Lowest home attendance: 15,587 vs. Guingamp (27 August 2016)
Home colours	Away colours

The 2016–17 AS Nancy Lorraine season is the 49th professional season of the club since its creation in 1967. It's their 1st season back in Ligue 1 after their promotion from Ligue 2 in the 2015–16 season.

== Players ==
French teams are limited to four players without EU citizenship. Hence, the squad list includes only the principal nationality of each player; several non-European players on the squad have dual citizenship with an EU country. Also, players from the ACP countries—countries in Africa, the Caribbean, and the Pacific that are signatories to the Cotonou Agreement—are not counted against non-EU quotas due to the Kolpak ruling.

=== Squad ===
As of 2 September 2016.

Note: Flags indicate national team as defined under FIFA eligibility rules; some limited exceptions apply. Players may hold more than one non-FIFA nationality.

No.	Pos.	Nation	Player
1	GK	BLR	Syarhey Chernik
2	DF	FRA	Clément Lenglet (vice-captain)
3	DF	FRA	Tobias Badila
4	DF	SEN	Modou Diagne
5	MF	FRA	Alou Diarra
6	MF	MAR	Youssef Aït Bennasser (on loan from Monaco)
7	MF	FRA	Antony Robic
8	MF	FRA	Vincent Marchetti
9	FW	FRA	Maurice Dalé
10	FW	SEN	Issiar Dia
11	MF	FRA	Karim Coulibaly
12	FW	FRA	Christophe Mandanne
13	MF	CIV	Serge N'Guessan
14	DF	FRA	Joffrey Cuffaut

No.	Pos.	Nation	Player
15	FW	MAR	Youssouf Hadji (captain)
16	GK	CMR	Guy N'dy Assembé
17	DF	FRA	Faitout Maouassa
18	MF	MTN	Dialo Guidileye
19	MF	FRA	Loïc Puyo
20	DF	MAR	Michaël Chrétien
22	FW	FRA	Yann Mabella
23	FW	FRA	Anthony Koura
24	DF	URU	Erick Cabaco (on loan from Nacional)
25	MF	FRA	Benoît Pedretti
26	DF	FRA	Vincent Muratori
28	DF	FRA	Julien Cétout
30	GK	FRA	Alexandre Menay

=== Out on loan ===
Note: Flags indicate national team as defined under FIFA eligibility rules; some limited exceptions apply. Players may hold more than one non-FIFA nationality.

No.	Pos.	Nation	Player
—	FW	FRA	Alexis Busin (on loan to Clermont)

=== Transfers ===
In:

No.	Pos.	Nation	Player
1	GK	BLR	Syarhey Chernik (from (Belarus) BATE Borisov)
6	MF	MAR	Youssef Aït Bennasser (On loan from Monaco previously at (France) Nancy)
8	DF	FRA	Vincent Marchetti (from (France) AC Ajaccio)
12	FW	FRA	Christophe Mandanne (from (United Arab Emirates) Al-Fujairah)
13	MF	CIV	Serge N'Guessan (from (Ivory Coast) AFAD Djékanou)
23	FW	FRA	Anthony Koura (from (France) Nîmes)

Out:

No.	Pos.	Nation	Player
6	MF	MAR	Youssef Aït Bennasser (to Monaco)
—	GK	FRA	Quentin Beunardeau (to (Belgium) Tubize, previously on loan)
—	MF	FRA	Arnaud Lusamba (to (France) Nice)

== Competitions ==
=== Ligue 1 ===
==== League table ====
Pos	Team	Pld	W	D	L	GF	GA	GD	Pts	Qualification or relegation
16	Dijon	38	8	13	17	46	58	−12	37	
17	Caen	38	10	7	21	36	65	−29	37	
18	Lorient (R)	38	10	6	22	44	70	−26	36	Qualification for the relegation play-offs
19	Nancy (R)	38	9	8	21	29	52	−23	35	Relegation to Ligue 2
20	Bastia (D, R)	38	8	10	20	29	54	−25	34	Relegation to National 3 (Note: After being relegated to Ligue 2, Bastia was initially further relegated to National due to financial difficulties. On 10 August 2017, the FFF announced that Bastia was denied entry to National. The club therefore took the place of its reserve team in Championnat National 3.)

Source: Ligue 1, Soccerway
Rules for classification: 1) Points; 2) Goal difference; 3) Goals scored; 4) Head-to-head goal difference; 5) Fairplay ranking.
(D) Disqualified; (R) Relegated

==== Results summary ====
Overall								Home						Away					
Pld	W	D	L	GF	GA	GD	Pts	W	D	L	GF	GA	GD	W	D	L	GF	GA	GD
38	9	8	21	29	52	−23	35	7	3	9	21	23	−2	2	5	12	8	29	−21

Last updated: 20 May 2017.
Source: Competitive matches

==== Results by round ====
Round	1	2	3	4	5	6	7	8	9	10	11	12	13	14	15	16	17	18	19	20	21	22	23	24	25	26	27	28	29	30	31	32	33	34	35	36	37	38
Ground	H	A	H	A	H	A	H	A	H	A	H	A	H	A	H	A	H	A	A	H	H	A	A	H	H	A	A	H	A	H	A	H	A	H	A	H	A	H
Result	L	L	L	W	D	D	L	L	L	D	W	L	W	D	W	L	W	D	D	W	L	W	L	L	L	L	L	D	L	L	L	W	L	D	L	L	L	W
Position	20	20	20	19	19	17	19	20	20	19	19	19	18	18	13	16	14	14	13	12	12	14	11	11	15	18	16	17	18	18	18	17	17	19	19	19	19	19

Source: Competitive matches
A = Away; H = Home; W = Win; D = Draw; L = Loss

==== Matches ====
14 August 2016 1	Nancy	0–3	Lyon	Tomblaine
15:00 CEST (UTC+02:00)	Cuffaut (yellow card) 27'; N'Guessan (yellow card) 40'; Muratori (yellow card) 43'; Badila (yellow card) 78'	Report	Nkoulou (yellow card) 29'; Lacazette 33', 44', 90+2'; Rafael (yellow card) 35'	Stadium: Stade Marcel Picot; Attendance: 18,885; Referee: Amaury Delerue

20 August 2016 2	Rennes	2–0	Nancy	Rennes
20:00 CEST (UTC+02:00)	Gourcuff 23'; Sio (yellow card) 40', (goal) 81'; André (yellow card) 58'; Pedro Henrique (yellow card) 63'; Fernandes (yellow card) 67'	Report	Muratori (yellow card) 21'; Cétout (yellow card) 28'	Stadium: Roazhon Park; Attendance: 20,703; Referee: Mikael Lesage

27 August 2016 3	Nancy	0–2	Guingamp	Tomblaine
20:00 CEST (UTC+02:00)	Lenglet (yellow card) 44'; Aït Bennasser (yellow card) 50'	Report	Coco (yellow card) 39'; Diallo 59'; Giresse 79'	Stadium: Stade Marcel Picot; Attendance: 15,587; Referee: Frank Schneider

10 September 2016 4	Lorient	0–2	Nancy	Lorient
20:00 CEST (UTC+02:00)		Report	Hadji (yellow card) 31'; Aït Bennasser 32'; Pedretti (yellow card) 45'; Puyo (yellow card) 56'; Guidileye (yellow card) 84'; Cuffaut (yellow card) 85'; Dalé 88'	Stadium: Stade du Moustoir; Attendance: 8,323; Referee: Olivier Thual

17 September 2016 5	Nancy	1–1	Nantes	Tomblaine
20:00 CEST (UTC+02:00)	Puyo 72'	Report	Stępiński 66'	Stadium: Stade Marcel Picot; Attendance: 17,034; Referee: Tony Chapron

21 September 2016 6	Bastia	0–0	Nancy	Furiani
19:00 CEST (UTC+02:00)		Report		Stadium: Stade Armand Cesari; Attendance: 9,139; Referee: Johan Hamel

25 September 2016 7	Nancy	0–1	Nice	Tomblaine
17:00 CEST (UTC+2)	N'Guessan (yellow card) 10'; Badila (yellow card) 38'; Lenglet (yellow card) 72'	Report	Bodmer (yellow card) 24'; Pléa 60'	Stadium: Stade Marcel Picot; Attendance: 17,580; Referee: Antony Gautier

1 October 2016 8	Lille	1–0	Nancy	Villeneuve-d'Ascq
20:00 CEST (UTC+02:00)	Bauthéac (yellow card) 32'; Éder 75' (pen.), (yellow card) 85'	Report	Lenglet (yellow card) 18'; Badila (yellow card) 49'; Chrétien (yellow card) 74'	Stadium: Stade Pierre-Mauroy; Attendance: 25,719; Referee: Sébastien Desiage

15 October 2016 9	Nancy	1–2	Paris Saint-Germain	Tomblaine
17:00 CET (UTC+1)	Diarra 55'; Cuffaut (yellow card) 70'	Report	Lucas 13'; Cavani 18'; Kimpembe (yellow card) 84'	Stadium: Stade Marcel Picot; Attendance: 19,524; Referee: Mikaël Lesage

22 October 2016 10	Bordeaux	1–1	Nancy	Bordeaux
20:00 CET (UTC+1)	Ménez 55'; Ounas (yellow card) 56'	Report	Diarra (yellow card) 23'; Lenglet (yellow card) 32'; Marchetti (yellow card) 56'; Koura 74'	Stadium: Nouveau Stade de Bordeaux; Attendance: 20,853; Referee: Stéphane Lannoy

29 October 2016 11	Nancy	2–0	Caen	Tomblaine
20:00 CET (UTC+1)	Mandanne 6'; Diarra 12', (yellow card) 68'; Pedretti (yellow card) 65'; N'Guessan (yellow card) 90+1'	Report	Yahia (yellow card) 75'; Rodelin (yellow card) 82'; Delaplace (yellow card) 90+1'	Stadium: Stade Marcel Picot; Referee: Tony Chapron

5 November 2016 12	Monaco	6–0	Nancy	Fontvieille
17:00 CEST (UTC+2)	Falcao 25', 30' (pen.); Mbappé 65'; Carrillo 87', 90+2'; Fabinho 90' (pen.)	Report	Badila (yellow card) 60'	Stadium: Stade Louis II; Attendance: 5,539; Referee: François Letexier

5 November 2016 13	Nancy	1–0	Dijon	Tomblaine
17:00 CET (UTC+1)	Robic (yellow card) 31'; Badila 77'	Report	Lang (yellow card) 45+1'; Abeid (yellow card) 54'; Rüfli (yellow card) 61'	Stadium: Stade Marcel Picot; Attendance: 16,341; Referee: Olivier Thual

26 November 2016 14	Montpellier	0–0	Nancy	Montpellier
20:00 CET (UTC+1)	Lasne (yellow card) 70'; Sessègnon (yellow card) 80' (yellow-red card) 82'	Report	Diagne (yellow card) 44'; Diarra (yellow card) 90'; Dia (yellow card) 90'	Stadium: Stade de la Mosson; Referee: Karim Abed

30 November 2016 15	Nancy	4–0	Metz	Tomblaine
19:00 CET (UTC+1)	Puyo (yellow card) 31'; Pedretti (yellow card) 33', (goal) 38'; Dia (yellow card) 48', (goal) 80'; Marchetti (yellow card) 53'; Cuffaut 78'; Aït Bennasser 90+2'	Report	Assou-Ekotto (yellow card) 19' (yellow-red card) 83'; Biševac (yellow card) 74'; Balliu (yellow card) 87'	Stadium: Stade Marcel Picot; Attendance: 19,085; Referee: Jérôme Miguelgorry

4 December 2016 16	Marseille	3–0	Nancy	Marseille
17:00 CET (UTC+1)	Thauvin 46'; Gomis 80'; N'Jie 90+2'	Report	Badila (yellow card) 24'; Pedretti (red card) 82'	Stadium: Stade Vélodrome; Attendance: 27,854; Referee: François Letexier

10 December 2016 17	Nancy	2–0	Angers	Tomblaine
20:00 CET (UTC+1)	Dia 29'; Puyo 63'; Marchetti (yellow card) 78'	Report	Pépé (yellow card) 90'	Stadium: Stade Marcel Picot; Attendance: 17,205; Referee: Sébastien Desiage

17 December 2016 18	Toulouse	1–1	Nancy	Toulouse
20:00 CET (UTC+1)	Toivonen (yellow card) 73'; Jullien 85'	Report	Guidileye (yellow card) 12'; Aït Bennasser 33'; Cuffaut (yellow card) 55'; Muratori (yellow card) 77'	Stadium: Stadium Municipal; Attendance: 15,061; Referee: Bartolomeu Varela

21 December 2016 19	Saint-Étienne	0–0	Nancy	Saint-Étienne
20:50 CET (UTC+1)	Lacroix (yellow card) 35'	Report	Mandanne (yellow card) 22'; Cabaco (red card) 60'	Stadium: Stade Geoffroy-Guichard; Attendance: 26,621; Referee: Olivier Thual

14 January 2017 20	Nancy	1–0	Bastia	Tomblaine
20:00 CET (UTC+1)	Guidileye (yellow card) 24'; Diarra (yellow card) 29'; Dia 59'	Report	Saint-Maximin (red card) 86'	Stadium: Stade Marcel Picot; Attendance: 15,423; Referee: (France) Karim Abed

28 January 2017 21	Nancy	0–2	Bordeaux	Tomblaine
20:00 CET (UTC+1)		Report	Pellenard (yellow card) 31'; Gajić (yellow card) 36'; Cuffaut 67' (o.g.); Malcom 88'	Stadium: Stade Marcel Picot; Attendance: 16,589; Referee: (France) Jérôme Brisard

5 February 2017 22	Nantes	0–2	Nancy	Nantes
17:00 CET (UTC+1)	Pardo (yellow card) 66'; Dubois (yellow card) 72'; Harit (red card) 90+2'	Report	Dia 50'; Diarra (yellow card) 52'; Cétout 64'; Muratori (red card) 90+2'	Stadium: Stade de la Beaujoire; Attendance: 20,250; Referee: (France) Clément Turpin

8 February 2017 23	Lyon	4–0	Nancy	Décines-Charpieu
19:00 CET (UTC+1)	Valbuena 39'; Fekir 43'; Gonalons (yellow card) 50'; Lacazette 54' (pen.); Depay 58'	Report	Mandanne (yellow card) 81'	Stadium: Parc Olympique Lyonnais; Attendance: 28,349; Referee: (France) Bartolomeu Varela

11 February 2017 24	Nancy	0–3	Montpellier	Tomblaine
20:00 CET (UTC+1)	Robic (yellow card) 30'; Badila (yellow card) 39'; Aït Bennasser (yellow card) 75'	Report	Mbenza 10' 60'; Mounié 19'; Mukiele (yellow card) 56'; Pokorný (yellow card) 70'	Stadium: Stade Marcel Picot; Attendance: 17,611; Referee: (France) Sébastien Desiage

18 February 2017 25	Angers	1–0	Nancy	Angers
20:00 CET (UTC+1)	Bamba 5'	Report	Diarra (yellow card) 10'	Stadium: Stade Raymond Kopa; Attendance: 10,569; Referee: (France) Olivier Thual

21 February 2017 26	Caen	1–0	Nancy	Caen
18:30 CET (UTC+1)	Rodelin 24'; Delaplace (yellow card) 66'; Guilbert (yellow card) 69'; Seube (yellow card) 73'	Report	Pedretti (yellow card) 3'; Guidileye (yellow card) 43'; Maouassa (yellow card) 51' (yellow-red card)	Stadium: Stade Michel d'Ornano; Attendance: 14,760; Referee: (France) Nicolas Rainville

25 February 2017 27	Nancy	0–0	Toulouse	Tomblaine
20:00 CET (UTC+1)	Pedretti (yellow card) 73'; Cuffaut (yellow card) 82'	Report	Braithwaite (yellow card) 42'; Yago (yellow card) 69'; Lafont (yellow card) 90+3'	Stadium: Stade Marcel Picot; Attendance: 16,323; Referee: (France) Benoît Millot

4 March 2017 28	Paris Saint-Germain	1–0	Nancy	Paris
17:00 CET (UTC+1)	Matuidi (yellow card) 46'; Kimpembe (yellow card) 61'; Cavani 80' (pen.)	Report	Maouassa (yellow card) 37'; Dia (yellow card) 45+2'; Koura (yellow card) 55'	Stadium: Parc des Princes; Attendance: 47,032; Referee: (France) Antony Gautier

11 March 2017 29	Nancy	1–2	Lille	Tomblaine
20:00 CET (UTC+1)	Dia 31'; Maouassa (yellow card) 50'; Cétout (yellow card) 76'; Pedretti (yellow card) 76'; Cuffaut (yellow card) 86'	Report	de Préville 63' (pen.) (yellow card) 86'; Rony Lopes (yellow card) 65' (goal) 81'	Stadium: Stade Marcel Picot; Attendance: 17,500; Referee: (France) Amaury Delerue

18 March 2017 30	Nancy	2–3	Lorient	Tomblaine
20:00 CET (UTC+1)	Maouassa 28'; Dia 42' (Pen.); Guidileye (yellow card) 88'	Report	Wakaso (yellow card) 37'; Lautoa (yellow card) 55' (goal) 86'; Moukandjo 66'; Mvuemba 90+4'	Stadium: Stade Marcel Picot; Attendance: 16,549; Referee: (France) Frank Schneider

31 March 2017 31	Guingamp	1–0	Nancy	Guingamp
19:00 CET (UTC+1)	Privat 59'; Martins Pereira (yellow card) 77'	Report	Maouassa (yellow card) 16'; Diagne (red card) 27'; Muratori (yellow card) 69'	Stadium: Stade de Roudourou; Attendance: 14,279; Referee: (France) Jérôme Miguelgorry

8 April 2017 32	Nancy	3–0	Rennes	Tomblaine
20:00 CET (UTC+1)	Muratori (yellow card) 1'; Dalé 11'; Cuffaut (yellow card) 33'; Dia 51' 65'	Report	Diakhaby (yellow card) 67'	Stadium: Stade Marcel Picot; Attendance: 18,009; Referee: (France) Jérôme Brisard

15 April 2017 33	Nice	3–1	Nancy	Nice
17:00 CET (UTC+1)	Le Bihan 35'; Dante (yellow card) 45+2'; Seri 51' (pen.) 84'	Report	Dalé 26'; Pedretti (yellow card) 30'; Puyo (yellow card) 58'	Stadium: Allianz Riviera; Attendance: 22,518; Referee: (France) Mikael Lesage

21 April 2017 34	Nancy	0–0	Olympique de Marseille	Tomblaine
20:45 CET (UTC+1)		Report	Payet (yellow card) 81'; Fanni (yellow card) 85'	Stadium: Stade Marcel Picot; Attendance: 20,087; Referee: (France) Nicolas Rainville

29 April 2017 35	Metz	2–1	Nancy	Metz
20:00 CET (UTC+1)	Sarr 28'; Nguette 53'; Falette (yellow card) 55'; Doukouré (yellow card) 70'	Report	Diarra (yellow card) 25'; Maouassa 41'; Badila (yellow card) 45+2'; Cétout (yellow card) 64'	Stadium: Stade Saint-Symphorien; Attendance: 20,009; Referee: (France) François Letexier

6 May 2017 36	Nancy	0–3	Monaco	Tomblaine
20:00 CET (UTC+1)	Robic (yellow card) 8'	Report	Badila 3' (o.g.); Sidibé (yellow card) 35'; Bernardo Silva 40'; Lemar 40'	Stadium: Stade Marcel Picot; Attendance: 19,519; Referee: (France) Ruddy Buquet

14 May 2017 37	Dijon	2–0	Nancy	Dijon
21:00 CET (UTC+1)	Haddadi (yellow card) 8'; Sammaritano 51'; Diony 76' (yellow card) 77'	Summary	Cuffaut (yellow card) 22'; Dalé (yellow card) 54'	Stadium: Stade Gaston Gérard; Attendance: 13,212; Referee: (France) Antony Gautier

20 May 2017 38	Nancy	3–1	Saint-Étienne	Tomblaine
21:00 CET (UTC+1)	Busin 17'; Cabaco (yellow card) 56'; Diagne 59'; N'Guessan (yellow card) 62'; Maouassa 82'	Summary	Nordin 74'	Stadium: Stade Marcel Picot; Attendance: 17,054; Referee: (France) Benoît Millot
