= 2016–17 Lille OSC season =

Lille
2016–17 season
- President: Michel Seydoux
- Manager: Frédéric Antonetti
- Stadium: Stade Pierre-Mauroy
- Ligue 1: 11th
- Coupe de France: Quarter-finals
- Coupe de la Ligue: Round of 16
- UEFA Europa League: Third qualifying round
- Top goalscorer: League: Nicolas de Préville (14); All: Nicolas de Préville (14)
- Highest home attendance: 40,485 vs Marseille (17 March 2017)
- Lowest home attendance: 8,265 vs Gabala (28 July 2016)
| Home colours | Away colours | Third colours |

The 2016–17 season was Lille OSC's 73rd season in existence and the club's 17th consecutive season in the top flight of French football.

This season Lille participated in the 2016–17 UEFA Europa League as a result of a 5th place finish in the 2015–16 Ligue 1.

Lille finished mid-table this season. New manager Riccardo del Silva could not help the team with results, but did not get sacked.

== Players ==
=== Squad information ===
As of 30 August 2016

| Squad No. | Name | Nationality | Position(s) | Date of birth (age) | Signed in | Contract until | Signed from |
Goalkeepers
| 1 | Vincent Enyeama | (Nigeria) | GK | 29 August 1982 (age 44) | 2011 | 2019 | (Israel) Hapoel Tel Aviv |
| 16 | Mike Maignan | (France) | GK | 3 July 1995 (age 31) | 2015 | 2020 | (France) Paris Saint-Germain |
| 30 | Jean Butez | (France) | GK | 8 June 1995 (age 31) | 2014 | 2018 | (France) Youth Sector |
Defenders
| 2 | Sébastien Corchia | (France) | RB | 1 October 1990 (age 36) | 2014 | 2018 | (France) Sochaux |
| 3 | Youssouf Koné | (Mali) | LB | 5 July 1995 (age 31) | 2014 | 2018 | (France) Youth Sector |
| 5 | Renato Civelli | (Argentina) | CB | 17 December 1986 (age 39) | 2015 | 2016 | (Turkey) Bursaspor |
| 13 | Stoppila Sunzu | (Zambia) | CB | 22 June 1989 (age 37) | 2015 | 2019 | (China) Shanghai Shenhua |
| 15 | Julian Palmieri | (France) | CB / AM | 17 December 1986 (age 39) | 2016 | 2018 | (France) Bastia |
| 18 | Franck Béria | (France) | RB | 23 May 1983 (age 43) | 2007 | 2018 | (France) Metz |
| 23 | Adama Soumaoro | (France) | CB | 18 June 1992 (age 34) | 2011 | 2019 | (France) Youth Sector |
| 25 | Marko Baša | (Montenegro) | CB | 29 December 1982 (age 43) | 2011 | 2019 | (Russia) Lokomotiv Moscow |
| — | Carlens Arcus | (Haiti) | RB | 28 June 1996 (age 30) | 2016 | 2017 | (France) Troyes |
| — | Hamza Mendyl | (Morocco) | CB | 21 October 1997 (age 29) | 2016 | 2019 | (France) Youth Sector |
Midfielders
| 4 | Younousse Sankharé | (Senegal) | LM / LB | 10 September 1989 (age 37) | 2016 | 2020 | (France) Guingamp |
| 6 | Ibrahim Amadou | (France) | CM | 6 April 1993 (age 33) | 2015 | 2019 | (France) Nancy |
| 8 | Mounir Obbadi | (Morocco) | CM | 4 April 1983 (age 43) | 2015 | 2018 | (France) Monaco |
| 10 | Morgan Amalfitano | (France) | AM | 20 March 1985 (age 41) | 2016 | 2018 | (England) West Ham United |
| 11 | Éric Bauthéac | (France) | LW / AM / RW | 28 August 1987 (age 39) | 2015 | 2018 | (France) Nice |
| 17 | Rony Lopes | (Portugal) | AM / RW | 28 December 1995 (age 30) | 2016 | 2017 | (France) Monaco |
| 24 | Rio Mavuba | (France) | DM / CM | 8 March 1984 (age 42) | 2008 | 2019 | (Spain) Villarreal |
| 27 | Naïm Sliti | (Tunisia) | AM | 27 July 1992 (age 34) | 2016 | 2017 | (France) Red Star |
| — | Yves Bissouma | (Mali) | CM | 30 August 1996 (age 30) | 2016 | 2019 | (France) Youth Sector |
Strikers
| 9 | Yassine Benzia | (Algeria) | CF | 8 September 1994 (age 32) | 2015 | 2019 | (France) Lyon |
| 12 | Nicolas de Préville | (France) | SS | 8 January 1991 (age 35) | 2016 | 2020 | (Belgium) Oostende |
| 14 | Junior Tallo | (Ivory Coast) | CF | 21 December 1992 (age 33) | 2015 | 2019 | (Italy) Roma |
| 19 | Eder | (Portugal) | CF | 22 December 1987 (age 38) | 2016 | 2020 | (Wales) Swansea City |
| 20 | Ryan Mendes | (Cape Verde) | SS / LW | 8 November 1990 (age 36) | 2012 | 2017 | (France) Le Havre |
| — | Martin Terrier | (France) | SS | 4 March 1997 (age 29) | 2016 | 2019 | (France) Youth Sector |
| — | Lebo Mothiba | (South Africa) | CF | 28 January 1998 (age 28) | 2016 | 2019 | (France) Youth Sector |

=== Appearances and goals ===
| No. | Pos. | Nat. | Name | Ligue 1 | | Coupe de France | | Coupe de la Ligue | | UEFA Europa League | | Total | | Discipline | | |
| No. | Pos. | Nat. | Name | Apps | Goals | Apps | Goals | Apps | Goals | Apps | Goals | Apps | Goals | A yellow rectangle, denoting the yellow penalty card shown to a player being cautioned | A red rectangle, denoting the red penalty card shown to a player being sent off | (yellow card) (yellow-red card) |
|---|---|---|---|---|---|---|---|---|---|---|---|---|---|---|---|---|
| 1 | GK | (Nigeria) | Vincent Enyeama | 8 | 0 | 0 | 0 | 0 | 0 | 2 | 0 | 10 | 0 | 1 | 0 | 0 |
| 2 | DF | (France) | Sébastien Corchia | 8 | 0 | 0 | 0 | 0 | 0 | 2 | 0 | 10 | 0 | 1 | 0 | 0 |
| 3 | DF | (Mali) | Youssouf Koné | 0 | 0 | 0 | 0 | 0 | 0 | 0 | 0 | 0 | 0 | 0 | 0 | 0 |
| 4 | MF | (Senegal) | Younousse Sankharé | 7+1 | 1 | 0 | 0 | 0 | 0 | 0+1 | 0 | 8 | 1 | 2 | 0 | 0 |
| 5 | DF | (Argentina) | Renato Civelli | 7 | 1 | 0 | 0 | 0 | 0 | 2 | 0 | 9 | 1 | 2 | 0 | 0 |
| 6 | MF | (France) | Ibrahim Amadou | 5+1 | 0 | 0 | 0 | 0 | 0 | 1+1 | 0 | 8 | 0 | 2 | 0 | 0 |
| 8 | MF | (Morocco) | Mounir Obbadi | 1 | 0 | 0 | 0 | 0 | 0 | 2 | 0 | 3 | 0 | 1 | 0 | 0 |
| 9 | FW | (France) | Yassine Benzia | 2+1 | 0 | 0 | 0 | 0 | 0 | 0+2 | 0 | 5 | 0 | 0 | 0 | 0 |
| 10 | MF | (France) | Morgan Amalfitano | 6+1 | 0 | 0 | 0 | 0 | 0 | 2 | 0 | 9 | 0 | 1 | 0 | 0 |
| 11 | MF | (France) | Éric Bauthéac | 5+2 | 0 | 0 | 0 | 0 | 0 | 2 | 0 | 9 | 0 | 3 | 0 | 0 |
| 12 | FW | (France) | Nicolas de Preville | 3+3 | 0 | 0 | 0 | 0 | 0 | 0 | 0 | 6 | 0 | 0 | 0 | 0 |
| 13 | DF | (Zambia) | Stoppila Sunzu | 0+2 | 0 | 0 | 0 | 0 | 0 | 0 | 0 | 2 | 0 | 0 | 0 | 0 |
| 14 | FW | (Ivory Coast) | Junior Tallo | 0 | 0 | 0 | 0 | 0 | 0 | 0 | 0 | 0 | 0 | 0 | 0 | 0 |
| 15 | DF | (France) | Julian Palmieri | 5+2 | 1 | 0 | 0 | 0 | 0 | 2 | 0 | 9 | 1 | 2 | 0 | 0 |
| 16 | GK | (France) | Mike Maignan | 0 | 0 | 0 | 0 | 0 | 0 | 0 | 0 | 0 | 0 | 0 | 0 | 0 |
| 17 | MF | (Portugal) | Rony Lopes | 5 | 2 | 0 | 0 | 0 | 0 | 2 | 0 | 7 | 2 | 0 | 0 | 0 |
| 18 | DF | (France) | Franck Béria | 3 | 1 | 0 | 0 | 0 | 0 | 0 | 0 | 3 | 1 | 1 | 0 | 1 |
| 19 | FW | (Portugal) | Éder | 7+1 | 1 | 0 | 0 | 0 | 0 | 1 | 0 | 9 | 1 | 0 | 0 | 0 |
| 20 | MF | (Cape Verde) | Ryan Mendes | 3+4 | 0 | 0 | 0 | 0 | 0 | 1+1 | 1 | 9 | 1 | 0 | 0 | 0 |
| 23 | DF | (France) | Adama Soumaoro | 4+1 | 0 | 0 | 0 | 0 | 0 | 1 | 0 | 6 | 0 | 0 | 0 | 0 |
| 24 | MF | (France) | Rio Mavuba | 3+2 | 0 | 0 | 0 | 0 | 0 | 1 | 0 | 6 | 0 | 0 | 0 | 0 |
| 25 | DF | (Montenegro) | Marko Baša | 6 | 1 | 0 | 0 | 0 | 0 | 1 | 0 | 7 | 1 | 0 | 0 | 0 |
| 27 | MF | (Tunisia) | Naïm Sliti | 0+1 | 0 | 0 | 0 | 0 | 0 | 0 | 0 | 1 | 0 | 0 | 0 | 0 |
| 30 | GK | (France) | Jean Butez | 0 | 0 | 0 | 0 | 0 | 0 | 0 | 0 | 0 | 0 | 0 | 0 | 0 |
| 33 | FW | (Mali) | Yves Bissouma | 1+1 | 0 | 0 | 0 | 0 | 0 | 0+1 | 0 | 3 | 0 | 1 | 0 | 0 |

Last updated: 1 October 2016.
Source: Match reports in Competitive matches, Ligue1.com

== Transfers ==
=== In ===
| Date | Pos. | Player | Age | Moved from | Fee | Source |
|---|---|---|---|---|---|---|
| 9 July 2016 | DF | (Haiti) Carlens Arcus | 20 | (France) Troyes | Undisclosed | |
| 5 July 2016 | MF | (France) Julian Palmieri | 29 | (France) Bastia | Free | |
| 9 July 2016 | DF | (Zambia) Stoppila Sunzu | 27 | (China) Shanghai Shenhua | Free | |
| 9 July 2016 | FW | (Portugal) Éder | 28 | (Wales) Swansea City | €4,5M | |
| 26 July 2016 | MF | (Senegal) Younousse Sankharé | 26 | (France) Guingamp | €3M | |

=== Loans in ===
| Date | Pos. | Player | Age | Loaned from | Return date | Source |
|---|---|---|---|---|---|---|
| 9 July 2016 | MF | (Portugal) Rony Lopes | 20 | (France) Monaco | 30 June 2017 | |
| 30 August 2016 | MF | (Tunisia) Naïm Sliti | 24 | (France) Red Star | 30 June 2017 | |
| 2 August 2016 | MF | (France) Nicolas de Préville | 25 | (Belgium) Oostende | 30 June 2017 | |

=== Out ===
| Date | Pos. | Player | Age | Moved to | Fee | Source |
|---|---|---|---|---|---|---|
| 25 May 2016 | MF | (France) Nolan Mbemba | 21 | (Portugal) Vitória de Guimarães | Free | |
| 18 June 2016 | FW | (Cameroon) Didier Lamkel Ze | 19 | (France) Niort | Free | |
| 22 June 2016 | DF | (France) Julian Jeanvier | 24 | (France) Stade de Reims | Free | |
| 23 June 2016 | GK | (France) Steeve Elana | 35 | (France) Gazélec Ajaccio | End of contract | |
| 29 June 2016 | FW | (Switzerland) Michael Frey | 21 | (Switzerland) Young Boys | €0,5M | |
| 30 June 2016 | MF | (Ghana) Yaw Yeboah | 19 | (England) Manchester City | Loan expiration | |
| 30 June 2016 | FW | (Ivory Coast) D'Avila Ba Loua | 19 | (Ivory Coast) Mimosas | Loan expiration | |
| 8 July 2016 | DF | (France) Djibril Sidibé | 23 | (France) Monaco | €15M | |
| 8 July 2016 | MF | (France) Florent Balmont | 36 | (France) Dijon | Free | |
| 20 July 2016 | FW | (France) Serhou Guirassy | 20 | (Germany) 1. FC Köln | €6M | |
| 26 July 2016 | FW | (France) Ronny Rodelin | 26 | (France) Caen | €1M | |
| 4 August 2016 | FW | (France) Kevin Koubemba | 23 | (Belgium) Sint-Truiden | Free | |
| 29 August 2016 | MF | (Morocco) Sofiane Boufal | 22 | (England) Southampton | €20M | |
| 29 August 2016 | DF | (France) Benjamin Pavard | 20 | (Germany) Stuttgart | €5M | |

=== Loans out ===
| Date | Pos. | Player | Age | Loaned to | Return date | Source |
|---|---|---|---|---|---|---|
| 27 June 2016 | MF | (France) Soualiho Meïté | 22 | (Belgium) Zulte Waregem | 30 June 2017 | |
| 4 July 2016 | FW | (Belgium) Baptiste Guillaume | 21 | (France) Strasbourg | 30 June 2017 | |
| 13 July 2016 | MF | (France) Marvin Martin | 28 | (France) Dijon | 30 June 2017 | |
| 19 July 2016 | MF | (Bolivia) Ricardo Roman | 20 | (France) Les Herbiers | 30 June 2017 | |
| 20 July 2016 | MF | (Portugal) Alexis Araujo | 19 | (France) Dunkerque | 30 June 2017 | |
| 28 July 2016 | FW | (France) Lenny Nangis | 22 | (France) Bastia | 30 June 2017 | |

== Pre-season ==
| 9 July 2016 Friendly | Lille | 1–0 | Dunkerque | Le Touquet |
| 18:00 | Own goal 51' | | | Stadium: Stade Ferdi Petit |

| 12 July 2016 Friendly | Lille | 0–0 | Red Star | Le Touquet |
| 18:00 | | | | Stadium: Stade Ferdi Petit |

| 16 July 2016 Friendly | Lille | 0–0 | Oostende | Le Touquet |
| 18:00 | | | | Stadium: Stade Ferdi Petit |

| 21 July 2016 Friendly | Waasland-Beveren | 0–1 | Lille | Beveren |
| 18:00 | | | Bauthéac 29' | Stadium: Freethiel Stadion |

== Competitions ==
=== Ligue 1 ===
==== League table ====
| Pos | Team | Pld | W | D | L | GF | GA | GD | Pts |
|---|---|---|---|---|---|---|---|---|---|
| 9 | Rennes | 38 | 12 | 14 | 12 | 36 | 42 | −6 | 50 |
| 10 | Guingamp | 38 | 14 | 8 | 16 | 46 | 53 | −7 | 50 |
| 11 | Lille | 38 | 13 | 7 | 18 | 40 | 47 | −7 | 46 |
| 12 | Angers | 38 | 13 | 7 | 18 | 40 | 49 | −9 | 46 |
| 13 | Toulouse | 38 | 10 | 14 | 14 | 37 | 41 | −4 | 44 |

Source: Ligue 1, Soccerway
Rules for classification: 1) Points; 2) Goal difference; 3) Goals scored; 4) Head-to-head goal difference; 5) Fairplay ranking.

==== Results summary ====
| Overall | | | | | | | | Home | | | | | | Away | | | | | |
| Pld | W | D | L | GF | GA | GD | Pts | W | D | L | GF | GA | GD | W | D | L | GF | GA | GD |
|---|---|---|---|---|---|---|---|---|---|---|---|---|---|---|---|---|---|---|---|
| 38 | 13 | 7 | 18 | 40 | 47 | −7 | 46 | 7 | 3 | 9 | 24 | 24 | 0 | 6 | 4 | 9 | 16 | 23 | −7 |

Last updated: 20 May 2017.
Source: Ligue 1

==== Results by round ====
| Round | 1 | 2 | 3 | 4 | 5 | 6 | 7 | 8 | 9 | 10 | 11 | 12 | 13 | 14 | 15 | 16 | 17 | 18 | 19 | 20 | 21 | 22 | 23 | 24 | 25 | 26 | 27 | 28 | 29 | 30 | 31 | 32 | 33 | 34 | 35 | 36 | 37 | 38 |
|---|---|---|---|---|---|---|---|---|---|---|---|---|---|---|---|---|---|---|---|---|---|---|---|---|---|---|---|---|---|---|---|---|---|---|---|---|---|---|
| Ground | A | H | A | H | A | H | A | H | A | H | H | A | H | A | H | A | H | A | H | H | A | A | H | A | H | A | H | A | A | H | A | H | A | H | A | H | A | H |
| Result | L | W | D | L | L | L | L | W | L | W | L | L | L | D | W | W | W | L | D | D | D | W | W | L | L | W | L | D | W | D | W | L | L | W | W | L | L | W |
| Position | 14 | 10 | 13 | 15 | 17 | 18 | 20 | 18 | 18 | 16 | 17 | 18 | 19 | 19 | 17 | 14 | 11 | 13 | 13 | 14 | 15 | 11 | 13 | 15 | 18 | 15 | 16 | 16 | 14 | 14 | 13 | 13 | 14 | 12 | 11 | 11 | 12 | 11 |

Source: Ligue 1
A = Away; H = Home; W = Win; D = Draw; L = Loss

==== Matches ====
| 13 August 2016 1 | Metz | 3–2 | Lille | Metz |
| 20:00 CEST (UTC+02:00) | Doukouré (yellow card) 45'; Erdinç 56', 76' (pen.); Cohade (yellow card) 80'; Jouffre 88' (pen.) | Report | Obbadi (yellow card) 29'; Lopes 35', 70'; Enyeama (yellow card) 87' | Stadium: Stade Saint-Symphorien; Attendance: 17,174; Referee: Mikael Lesage |

| 29 August 2016 2 | Lille | 1–0 | Dijon | Villeneuve d'Ascq |
| 20:00 CEST (UTC+02:00) | Palmieri (yellow card) 70'; Sankharé 87' | Report | Marié (yellow card) 41'; Balmont (yellow card) 62' | Stadium: Stade Pierre-Mauroy; Attendance: 25,548; Referee: Olivier Thual |

| 27 August 2016 3 | Nice | 1–1 | Lille | Nice |
| 20:00 CEST (UTC+02:00) | Koziello 3'; Henrique (yellow card) 49'; Bodmer (yellow card) 62' | Report | Béria 27', (yellow card) 64'; Amadou (yellow card) 82' | Stadium: Allianz Riviera; Attendance: 16,355; Referee: François Letexier |

| 10 September 2016 4 | Lille | 1–4 | Monaco | Villeneuve d'Ascq |
| 20:00 CEST (UTC+02:00) | Palmieri (yellow card) 44', (goal) 90'; Bauthéac (yellow card) 76'; Amadou (yellow card) 83' | Report | Sidibé 2'; Traoré 17'; Bakayoko (yellow card) 45+1'; Fabinho 47'; Glik 71' | Stadium: Stade Pierre-Mauroy; Attendance: 29,373; Referee: Tony Chapron |

| 17 September 2016 5 | Lorient | 1–0 | Lille | Lorient |
| 20:00 CEST (UTC+02:00) | Bellugou (yellow card) 25'; Touré (yellow card) 72'; Moukandjo 76' (pen.) | Report | Sankharé (yellow card) 35'; Civelli (yellow card) 47' | Stadium: Stade du Moustoir; Attendance: 8,826; Referee: Karim Abed |

| 20 September 2016 6 | Lille | 1–2 | Toulouse | Villeneuve d'Ascq |
| 19:00 CEST (UTC+02:00) | Baša 34'; Bauthéac (yellow card) 45+1'; Bissouma (yellow card) 69' | Report | Toivonen 12', 78', (yellow card) 21'; Sylla (yellow card) 15'; Yago (yellow card) 20'; Diop (yellow card) 38'; Moubandje (yellow card) 66' | Stadium: Stade Pierre-Mauroy; Referee: Jérôme Miguelgorry |

| 25 September 2016 7 | Saint-Étienne | 3–1 | Lille | Saint-Étienne |
| 15:00 | Dabo (yellow card) 41'; Berić 63'; Nordin 72'; Lacroix (yellow card) 78'; Roux (yellow card) 85', (goal) 90+2' | Report | Béria (yellow card) 38' (yellow-red card) 43'; Civelli 80', (yellow card) 84' | Stadium: Stade Geoffroy-Guichard; Attendance: 24,700; Referee: Benoît Millot |

| 1 October 2016 8 | Lille | 1–0 | Nancy | Villeneuve d'Ascq |
| 20:00 CEST (UTC+02:00) | Bauthéac (yellow card) 32'; Eder 75' (pen.), 85' | Report | Lenglet (yellow card) 18'; Badila (yellow card) 49'; Chrétien (yellow card) 74' | Stadium: Stade Pierre-Mauroy; Attendance: 25,719; Referee: Sébastien Desiage |

| 15 October 2016 9 | Guingamp | 1–0 | Lille | Guingamp |
| 20:00 CEST (UTC+02:00) | Privat (yellow card) 18', (goal) 32' | Report | | Stadium: Stade du Roudourou; Attendance: 12,636; Referee: Sébastien Moreira |

| 22 October 2016 10 | Lille | 2–1 | Bastia | Villeneuve d'Ascq |
| 20:00 | Corchia 51'; Eder 57', (yellow card) 88'; Civelli (yellow card) 76'; Béria (yellow card) 90+3' | Report | Saint-Maximin (yellow card) 64'; Diallo 71' | Stadium: Stade Pierre-Mauroy; Attendance: 25,932; Referee: Ruddy Buquet |

| 28 October 2016 11 | Lille | 0–1 | Paris Saint-Germain | Villeneuve d'Ascq |
| 20:45 CET (UTC+1) | Mavuba (yellow card) 54'; Civelli (yellow card) 79' | Report | Kurzawa (yellow card) 45'; Cavani 65' | Stadium: Stade Pierre-Mauroy; Attendance: 37,123; Referee: Benoît Bastien |

| 5 November 2016 12 | Angers | 1–0 | Lille | Angers |
| 12.45 CET | Diedhiou 54' | Report | | Stadium: Stade Jean Bouin; Attendance: 9,749; Referee: Clément Turpin |

| 18 November 2016 13 | Lille | 0–1 | Lyon | Villeneuve d'Ascq |
| 20:45 CET (UTC+01:00) | Sankharé (yellow card) 21' (yellow-red card) 55'; Corchia (yellow card) 26'; De Préville (yellow card) 46' | Report | Cornet 3', (yellow card) 32'; Rafael (yellow card) 73'; Diakhaby (yellow card) 76' | Stadium: Stade Pierre-Mauroy; Attendance: 39,445; Referee: Jérôme Miguelgorry |

| 26 November 2016 14 | Nantes | 0–0 | Lille | Nantes |
| 20:00 CET (UTC+1) | | Report | | Stadium: Stade de la Beaujoire; Attendance: 18,125; Referee: Olivier Thual |

| 29 November 2016 15 | Lille | 4–2 | Caen | Villeneuve d'Ascq |
| 15.00 CET | Eder 12'; Sliti 24'; De Préville 64'; Lopes 65' | Report | Féret 31'; Ben Youssef (yellow card) 74'; Rodelin 84' | Stadium: Stade Pierre-Mauroy; Attendance: 23,216; Referee: Saïd Ennjimi |

| 3 December 2016 16 | Bordeaux | 0–1 | Lille | Bordeaux |
| 20:00 CET (UTC+1) | Laborde (yellow card) 34'; Sertic (yellow card) 61' | Report | Amadou (yellow card) 33'; De Préville 44'; Soumaoro (yellow card) 73'; Palmieri (yellow card) 90+1' | Stadium: Matmut Atlantique; Attendance: 19,250; Referee: Ruddy Buquet |

| 10 December 2016 17 | Lille | 2–1 | Montpellier | Villeneuve d'Ascq |
| 20:00 CET (UTC+1) | De Préville 5'; Sankharé 38'; Enyeama (yellow card) 90+4' | Report | Mounié (yellow card) 18', (goal) 81' | Stadium: Stade Pierre-Mauroy; Attendance: 27,391; Referee: Tony Chapron |

| 18 December 2016 18 | Marseille | 2–0 | Lille | Marseille |
| 17:00 CET (UTC+1) | Gomis 56'; Thauvin 61' | Report | | Stadium: Stade Vélodrome |

| 21 December 2016 19 | Lille | 1–1 | Rennes | Villeneuve d'Ascq |
| 20:45 CET (UTC+1) | De Préville 71' | Report | Hamouma 17'; Dabo (yellow card) 32'; Polomat (yellow card) 44'; Veretout (yellow card) 65' | Stadium: Stade Pierre-Mauroy; Attendance: 36,879; Referee: Mikaël Lesage |

| 13 January 2017 20 | Lille | 1–1 | Saint-Étienne | Villeneuve d'Ascq |
| 20:45 CET (UTC+1) | De Préville 71' | Report | Hamouma 17'; Dabo (yellow card) 32'; Polomat (yellow card) 44'; Veretout (yellow card) 65' | Stadium: Stade Pierre-Mauroy; Attendance: 36,879; Referee: Mikaël Lesage |

| 21 January 2017 21 | Dijon | 0-0 | Lille | Dijon |
| 20:00 CET (UTC+1) | Lang (yellow card) 29'; Lotiès (yellow card) 47' | Report | Benzia (yellow card) 27'; Béria (yellow card) 57' | Stadium: Stade Gaston Gérard; Attendance: 7,828; Referee: Jérôme Miguelgorry |

| 28 January 2017 22 | Lyon | 1–2 | Lille | Lyon |
| 17:00 CET (UTC+1) | Valbuena (yellow card) 58'; Lacazette 86' (pen.) | Report | Sankharé (yellow card) 16'; Benzia 38', 80' (pen.); Bauthéac (yellow card) 80'; Bissouma (yellow card) 90+5' | Stadium: Parc Olympique Lyonnais; Attendance: 35,479; Referee: Johan Hamel |

| 4 February 2017 23 | Lille | 0–1 | Lorient | Villeneuve d'Ascq |
| 20:00 | Béria (yellow card) 66' | Report | Wakaso (yellow card) 41'; Aliadière 49' | Stadium: Stade Pierre-Mauroy; Attendance: 38,153; Referee: Jérôme Miguelgorry |

| 7 February 2017 24 | Paris Saint-Germain | 2–1 | Lille | Paris |
| 21:00 CET (UTC+1) | Kimpembe (yellow card) 60'; Cavani 70'; Lucas 90+2' | Report | Benzia (yellow card) 30'; Corchia (yellow card) 83'; De Préville 86'; Enyeama (yellow card) 90+2' | Stadium: Parc des Princes; Attendance: 42,885; Referee: François Letexier |

| 11 February 2017 25 | Lille | 1–2 | Angers | Villeneuve d'Ascq |
| 20:00 CET (UTC+1) | Bissouma 27', (red card) 83'; El Ghazi (yellow card) 62' | Report | Capelle 20'; Traoré (yellow card) 24'; Thomas 60'; Diédhiou (yellow card) 81' | Stadium: Stade Pierre-Mauroy; Attendance: 25,731; Referee: Bartolomeu Varela |

| 18 February 2017 26 | Caen | 0–1 | Lille | Caen |
| 20:00 CET (UTC+01:00) | Yahia (yellow card) 55' | Summary | El Ghazi (yellow card) 31', (goal) 69'; Soumaoro (red card) 63' | Stadium: Stade Michel d'Ornano; Attendance: 15,897; Referee: Karim Abed |

| 25 February 2017 27 | Lille | 2–3 | Bordeaux | Villeneuve d'Ascq |
| 20:00 CET (UTC+1) | Palmieri (yellow card) 36' (yellow-red card) 80'; Amadou (yellow card) 40'; Xeka (yellow card) 66'; De Préville 66' (pen.); Eder 67'; Corchia (yellow card) 89'; Mavuba (yellow card) 90+2', (red card) 90+2' | Report | Vada 16', (yellow card) 42'; Ounas 78', 82'; Gajić (yellow card) 90+3' | Stadium: Stade Pierre-Mauroy; Attendance: 28,772; Referee: Sébastien Desiage |

| 5 March 2017 28 | Toulouse | 1–1 | Lille | Toulouse |
| 17:00 CET (UTC+01:00) | Jullien 30'; Yago (yellow card) 68'; Lafont (yellow card) 80' | Report | Eder (yellow card) 51'; Benzia 80'; Enyeama (yellow card) 84' | Stadium: Stadium Municipal; Attendance: 12,261; Referee: Johan Hamel |

| 11 March 2017 29 | Nancy | 1–2 | Lille | Tomblaine |
| 20:00 CET (UTC+1) | Dia 31'; Maouassa (yellow card) 50'; Cétout (yellow card) 76'; Pedretti (yellow card) 76'; Cuffaut (yellow card) 86' | Report | De Préville 63' (pen.), (yellow card) 86'; Lopes (yellow card) 65', (goal) 81' | Stadium: Stade Marcel Picot; Attendance: 17,500; Referee: Amaury Delerue |

| 17 March 2017 30 | Lille | 0–0 | Marseille | Villeneuve d'Ascq |
| 20:45 CEST (UTC+1) | Xeka (yellow card) 49' | Report | Bedimo (yellow card) 26'; Sanson (yellow card) 68'; Payet (yellow card) 87'; Sakai (yellow card) 90+1' | Stadium: Stade Pierre-Mauroy; Attendance: 40,485; Referee: Mikael Lesage |

| 1 April 2017 31 | Bastia | 0–1 | Lille | Bastia |
| 19:00 | Crivelli (yellow card) 74' | Report | Béria (yellow card) 25'; De Préville 48' | Stadium: Stade Armand Cesari; Attendance: 9,908; Referee: Benoît Millot |

| 7 April 2017 32 | Lille | 1–2 | Nice | Villeneuve d'Ascq |
| 20:45 CET (UTC+1) | Amadou 14'; Mavuba (yellow card) 74' | Report | Balotelli 17', 44'; Dante (yellow card) 61' | Stadium: Stade Pierre-Mauroy; Attendance: 32,107; Referee: Amaury Delerue |

| 15 April 2017 33 | Rennes | 2–0 | Lille | Rennes |
| 20:00 CEST (UTC+02:00) | Mubele 3'; Sio 29'; Chantôme (yellow card) 84' | Report | Béria (yellow card) 55'; Bissouma (yellow card) 76' | Stadium: Roazhon Park; Attendance: 24,056; Referee: Karim Abed |

| 22 April 2017 34 | Lille | 3–0 | Guingamp | Villeneuve d'Ascq |
| 20:00 CEST (UTC+02:00) | De Préville 9', 35' (pen.); Eder 66' | Report | Bodmer (yellow card) 16'; Kerbrat (yellow card) 35' | Stadium: Stade Pierre-Mauroy; Attendance: 28,848; Referee: Clément Turpin |

| 29 April 2017 35 | Montpellier | 0–3 | Lille | Montpellier |
| 20:00 CEST (UTC+02:00) | Roussillon (yellow card) 59' | Report | De Préville 13' (pen.); Xeka 56'; Martin Terrier 75' | Stadium: Stade de la Mosson; Attendance: 10,139; Referee: Benoît Bastien |

| 6 May 2017 36 | Lille | 0–2 | Metz | Villeneuve d'Ascq |
| 20:00 CEST (UTC+2) | Corchia (yellow card) 53' | Report | Mandjeck 37'; Cohade 56' | Stadium: Stade Pierre-Mauroy; Attendance: 28,331; Referee: Olivier Thual |

| 14 May 2017 37 | Monaco | 4–0 | Lille | Fontvieille |
| 21:15 CEST (UTC+2) | Falcao 6', 69'; Silva 45+2'; Jemerson (yellow card) 48'; Alonso 89' (o.g.) | Report | Sliti (yellow card) 51'; Mavuba (yellow card) 58' | Stadium: Stade Louis II; Attendance: 13,152; Referee: Benoît Bastien |

| 20 May 2017 38 | Lille | 3–0 | Nantes | Villeneuve d'Ascq |
| 21:00 CET (UTC+1) | De Préville 16', 46', 53' (pen.) | Report | | Stadium: Stade Pierre-Mauroy; Attendance: 28,390; Referee: Sébastien Desiage |

=== Coupe de France ===
| 7 January 2017 Round of 64 | Lille | 4–1 | (Réunion) AS Excelsior | Villeneuve-d'Ascq |
| 15:00 CET | Amadou 17'; Soumaoro 59'; Lopes 89'; Terrier 90' | | Pythié 88' | Stadium: Stade Pierre-Mauroy; Attendance: 6,673; Referee: Ruddy Buquet |

| 31 January 2017 Round of 32 | Lille | 1–0 | Nantes | Lille |
| 18:00 CET | Corchia 80' (pen.) | | | Stadium: Stade Pierre-Mauroy; Attendance: 7,571; Referee: Sébastien Desiage |

| 2 March 2017 Round of 16 | Bergerac Périgord FC | 1–2 | Lille | Libourne |
| 21:00 CET | Kamissoko 90+2'; Pinto (red card) 90+5' | Report | Lopes 70'; Eder 90+4' | Stadium: Stade Jean-Antoine Moueix; Attendance: 4,223; Referee: Olivier Thual |

| 4 April 2017 Quarter-finals | Monaco | 2–1 | Lille | Monaco |
| 21:00 CEST | Germain 35', 45' | Report | Arcus (red card) 40'; El Ghazi 90+3' | Stadium: Stade Louis II; Attendance: 5,709; Referee: Tony Chapron |

=== Coupe de la Ligue ===
| 14 December 2016 Round of 16 | Paris Saint-Germain | 3–1 | Lille | Paris |
| 21:05 | Meunier (yellow card) 31'; Lucas 43' (pen.), 57'; Jesé 69' | Report | Maignan (yellow card) 42'; Terrier (yellow card) 51'; Sankharé (yellow card) 77'; Basa 89' | Stadium: Parc des Princes; Attendance: 45,183; Referee: Mikael Lesage |

=== UEFA Europa League ===
==== Third qualifying round ====
| 28 July 2016 First leg | Lille (France) | 1–1 | (Azerbaijan) Gabala | Villeneuve-d'Ascq |
| 19:00 CEST (UTC+02:00) | Corchia (yellow card) 43'; Mendes 47' | Report | Vernydub 13'; Ozobić (yellow card) 42'; Kvekveskiri (yellow card) 44' | Stadium: Stadium Lille Métropole; Attendance: 8,265; Referee: Daniel Stefański (Poland) |

| 4 August 2016 Second leg | Gabala (Azerbaijan) | 1–0 (2–1 agg.) | (France) Lille | Baku |
| 19:00 CEST (UTC+02:00) | Ozobić 34'; Kvekveskiri (yellow card) 44'; Mammadov (yellow card) 90+4' | Report | Amalfitano (yellow card) 26'; Sankharé (yellow card) 88' | Stadium: Bakcell Arena; Attendance: 10,550; Referee: Aleksei Eskov (Russia) |
