= Anthony Koura =

Footballer (born 1993)

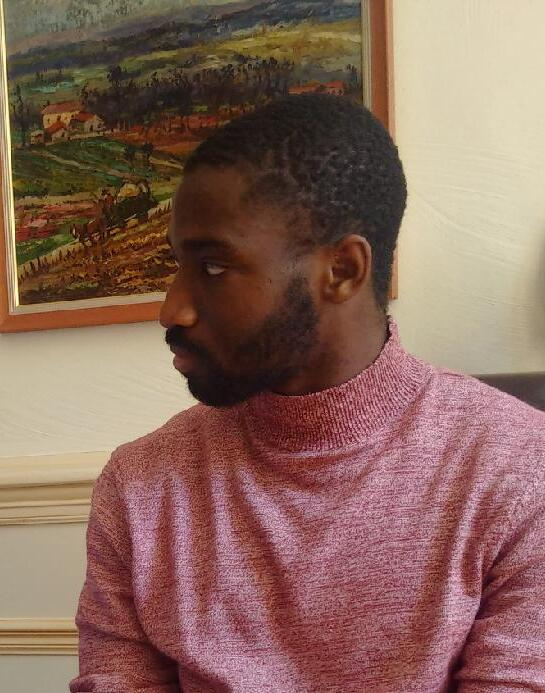

Personal information
- Date of birth: 6 May 1993 (age 33)
- Place of birth: Le Mans, France
- Height: 1.80 m (5 ft 11 in)
- Position: Striker

Team information
- Current team: Lausanne-Sport
- Number: 11

Youth career
- 2000–2004: Cheminots du Mans
- 2004–2011: Le Mans

Senior career*
Years	Team	Apps	(Gls)
2011–2013	Le Mans	9	(0)
2013	→ Luzenac (loan)	15	(6)
2013–2016	Nîmes	84	(19)
2016–2018	Nancy	41	(3)
2019–2021	Lausanne-Sport	41	(11)
2021	→ Neuchâtel Xamax (loan)	8	(0)

International career^{‡}
2008–2009	France U16	17	(8)
2009–2010	France U17	13	(5)
2010–2011	France U18	7	(3)
2011–2012	France U19	7	(3)
2017	Burkina Faso	2	(0)
- * Club domestic league appearances and goals as of 12 March 2021 ‡ National team caps and goals as of 10 June 2017

Anthony Koura (born 6 May 1993) is a professional footballer who plays as a striker. Born in France, he played for the Burkina Faso national team.

== Club career ==
On 9 June 2011, after featuring with the Le Mans's reserve team in the Championnat de France Amateur for two straight seasons, Koura signed his first professional contract agreeing to a three-year deal. He was subsequently promoted to the senior team permanently for the 2011–12 season and was assigned the number 11 shirt. He made his professional debut on 26 August 2011 appearing as a substitute in a 1–0 league defeat to Châteauroux.

In early July 2016, Koura signed a three-year contract with newly promoted Ligue 1 club AS Nancy.

In January 2019, he moved to FC Lausanne-Sport.

== International career ==
Koura is a French youth international at various levels. With the under-17 team, Koura played at the 2010 UEFA European Under-17 Championship.

Koura is of Burkinabé descent, and was called up several times to the Burkina Faso national team. He made his debut for Burkina Faso in a 2–0 friendly loss to Morocco on 24 March 2017.

== Career statistics ==
=== Club ===
As of 21 May 2018

Appearances and goals by club, season and competition
Club	Season	League			Cup (Note: Includes Coupe de France, Coupe de la Ligue, Trophée des champions)		Europe (Note: Includes UEFA Super Cup)		Total	
Club	Season	Division	Apps	Goals	Apps	Goals	Apps	Goals	Apps	Goals
Le Mans	2011–12	Ligue 2	7	0	1	0	—		8	0
Le Mans	2012–13	Ligue 2	2	0	0	0	—		2	0
Le Mans	Total		9	0	1	0	0	0	10	0
Luzenac (loan)	2012–13	Championnat National	15	6	0	0	—		15	6
Nîmes	2013–14	Ligue 2	24	3	1	0	—		25	3
Nîmes	2014–15	Ligue 2	33	7	3	0	—		36	7
Nîmes	2015–16	Ligue 2	27	9	1	0	—		28	9
Nîmes	Total		84	19	5	0	0	0	89	19
Nancy	2016–17	Ligue 1	15	1	5	0	—		20	1
Nancy	2017–18	Ligue 2	15	2	2	0	—		17	2
Nancy	Total		30	3	7	0	0	0	37	3
Career total			138	28	13	0	0	0	151	28
