= Youssef Aït Bennasser =

Moroccan footballer (born 1996)

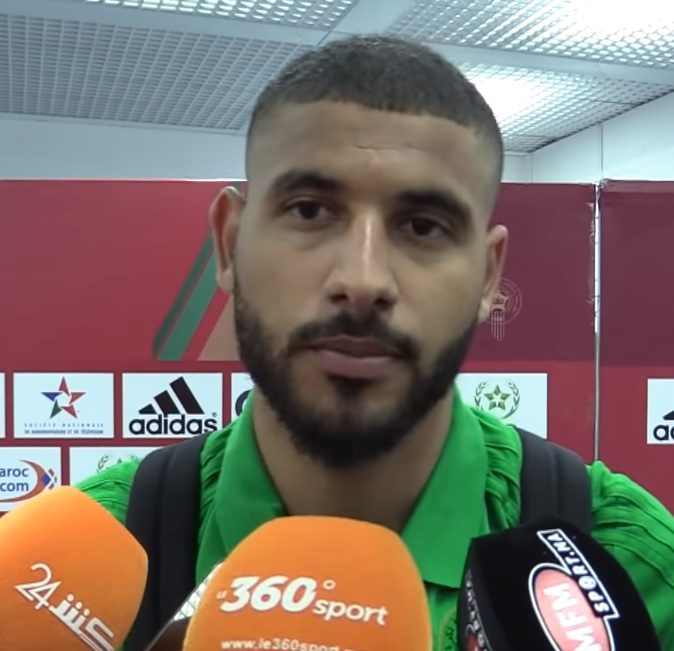
- Aït Bennasser with Morocco in 2019

Personal information
- Full name: Youssef Aït Bennasser
- Date of birth: 7 July 1996 (age 30)
- Place of birth: Toul, France
- Height: 1.84 m (6 ft 0 in)
- Position: Midfielder

Team information
- Current team: RS Berkane
- Number: 6

Youth career
- 2013–2015: Nancy

Senior career*
Years	Team	Apps	(Gls)
2015–2016	Nancy	33	(1)
2016–2021	Monaco	13	(0)
2016–2017	→ Nancy (loan)	26	(3)
2017–2018	→ Caen (loan)	27	(0)
2019	→ Saint-Étienne (loan)	13	(0)
2019–2020	→ Bordeaux (loan)	12	(0)
2021–2023	Adanaspor	45	(3)
2023–2025	Samsunspor	58	(2)
2025–2026	Kayserispor	21	(0)
2026–	RS Berkane	0	(0)

International career^{‡}
2013	Morocco U17	2	(0)
2016–2019	Morocco	24	(0)
- * Club domestic league appearances and goals as of 10 June 2026 ‡ National team caps and goals as of 6 September 2019

Youssef Aït Bennasser (born 7 July 1996) is a professional footballer who plays as a midfielder for RS Berkane. Born in France, he represents Morocco at international level.

== Club career ==
=== Nancy ===
Aït Bennasser is a youth exponent from AS Nancy. He made his Ligue 2 debut on 3 August 2015 against Tours FC. He scored the first senior goal of his career on 28 November 2015 as Nancy beat Le Havre 3–1 in a home of Stade Marcel Picot victory.

=== Monaco and loans ===
On 25 June 2016, Aït Bennasser was announced at AS Monaco, signing a five-year contract with the club. After joining Monaco, he was immediately loaned back to Nancy.

On 16 August 2017, Aït Bennasser was announced at Stade Malherbe Caen on a one-year loan, with no option to buy.

On 31 January 2019, the last day of the 2018–19 winter transfer window, Aït Bennasser departed Monaco on loan for the third time, joining the club's league rivals AS Saint-Étienne on loan until the end of the season.

On 23 September 2019, Aït Bennasser was announced at Bordeaux on a one-year loan, with a mandatory purchase after 15 starts.

=== Adanaspor ===
The Moroccan midfielder signed a two-year contract with Turkish club Adanaspor, which is in the TFF First League.

== International career ==
Despite being born and raised in France, in March 2016, Aït Bennasser joined the Royal Moroccan Football Federation, being called up by Hervé Renard. He played two matches for the Morocco national under-17 football team in 2013.

On 4 January 2017, Aït Bennasser was called up to the Morocco squad for the 2017 Africa Cup of Nations.

He made his debut for the senior Morocco national team in a friendly 0–0 tie with Albania. In May 2018 he was named in Morocco's 23-man squad for the 2018 World Cup in Russia.

On 27 May 2019, Aït Bennasser was called up to the provisional Morocco squad for the 2019 Africa Cup of Nations. He would make the final cut on 11 June 2019.

== Career statistics ==
=== Club ===
As of 3 August 2020

Appearances and goals by club, season and competition
Club	Season	League			Cup		League Cup		Europe		Other		Total	
Club	Season	Division	Apps	Goals	Apps	Goals	Apps	Goals	Apps	Goals	Apps	Goals	Apps	Goals
Nancy	2015–16	Ligue 2	33	1	0	0	1	0	—		—		34	1
Nancy (loan)	2016–17	Ligue 1	26	3	0	0	1	0	—		—		27	4
Caen (loan)	2017–18	Ligue 1	27	0	1	0	1	0	—		—		29	0
Monaco	2018–19	Ligue 1	13	0	0	0	2	0	3	0	—		18	0
Saint-Étienne (loan)	2018–19	Ligue 1	13	0	0	0	0	0	—		—		13	0
Bordeaux (loan)	2019–20	Ligue 1	12	0	2	0	2	0	—		—		14	0
Career total			124	4	3	0	7	0	3	0	0	0	135	5

=== International ===
As of match played 5 August 2019

Appearances and goals by national team and year
National team	Year	Apps	Goals
Morocco	2016	5	0
Morocco	2017	5	0
Morocco	2018	6	0
Morocco	2019	5	0
Total		21	0
