= Romain Bauchet =

French professional footballer (born 1994)

Personal information
- Date of birth: 2 May 1994 (age 32)
- Place of birth: Saint-Omer, France
- Height: 1.75 m (5 ft 9 in)
- Position: Striker

Team information
- Current team: Saint-Omer

Senior career*
Years	Team	Apps	(Gls)
2013–2016	Nancy	3	(0)
2015–2016	→ Épinal (loan)	20	(1)
2016-2017	Calais	13	(1)
2017-2018	Arques		
2018-	Saint-Omer		
- * Club domestic league appearances and goals as of 10:40, 19 October 2020 (UTC)

Romain Bauchet (born 2 May 1994) is a French professional footballer who plays as a forward. He currently plays for US Saint-Omer.

== Career statistics ==
As of 18 May 2016.

Appearances and goals by club, season and competition
Club	Division	Season	League		Cup		League Cup		Total	
Club	Division	Season	Apps	Goals	Apps	Goals	Apps	Goals	Apps	Goals
Nancy	Ligue 2	2013–14	2	0	0	0	0	0	2	0
Nancy	Ligue 2	2014–15	0	0	0	0	1	0	1	0
Épinal (loan)	National	2015–16	19	1	1	0	0	0	20	1
Calais	National 2	2016–17	13	1	0	0	0	0	13	1
Career totals			34	2	1	0	1	0	36	2
