= Faitout Maouassa =

French footballer (born 1998)

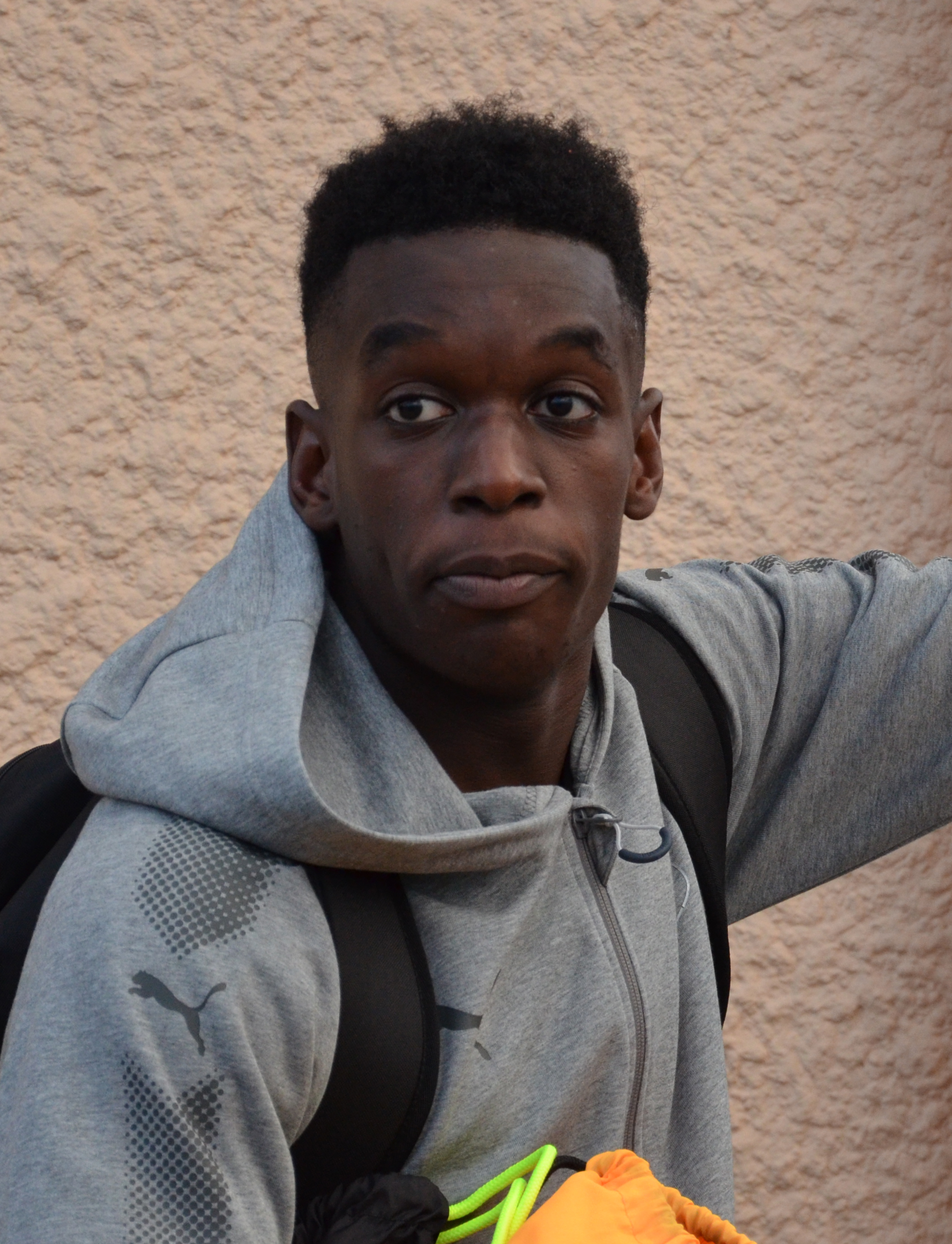
- Maouassa in 2017

Personal information
- Full name: Christ-Emmanuel Faitout Maouassa
- Date of birth: 6 July 1998 (age 28)
- Place of birth: Villepinte, France
- Height: 1.70 m (5 ft 7 in)
- Positions: Left-back; left midfielder; left winger

Youth career
- 2005–2010: Val d'Argenteuil ASC
- 2010–2013: RFC Argenteuil
- 2013–2015: Nancy

Senior career*
Years	Team	Apps	(Gls)
2015–2016	Nancy B	17	(6)
2015–2017	Nancy	18	(4)
2017–2021	Rennes	65	(3)
2018	→ Nîmes B (loan)	1	(0)
2018–2019	→ Nîmes (loan)	27	(0)
2018	Rennes B	5	(1)
2021–2024	Club Brugge	7	(0)
2022–2023	→ Montpellier (loan)	33	(5)
2023–2024	→ Lens (loan)	3	(0)
2023–2024	→ Lens B (loan)	3	(0)
2024	→ Granada (loan)	6	(0)
2025–2026	Nancy	18	(0)

International career^{‡}
2014–2015	France U17	11	(0)
2015–2016	France U18	12	(2)
2016	France U19	12	(0)
2017–2018	France U20	4	(0)
2019–2021	France U21	6	(0)
- * Club domestic league appearances and goals as of 12 May 2026 ‡ National team caps and goals as of 31 May 2021

Christ-Emmanuel Faitout Maouassa (born 6 July 1998) is a French professional footballer who plays as a left-back.

== Club career ==
Maouassa came through the youth section of Nancy. He made his Ligue 2 debut on 3 August 2015 in a match against Tours. On 16 June 2017, Maouassa signed a four-year deal with Ligue 1 club Rennes after Nancy had suffered relegation.

On 31 August 2021, Maouassa signed for Belgian side Club Brugge. He was loaned back to Ligue 1 with Montpellier on 21 June 2022. In September 2023, he joined Lens on a season-long loan with an option-to-buy. On 25 January 2024, Maouassa moved on a new loan to Granada in Spain.

== International career ==
Maouassa was born in France to parents from the Republic of the Congo. He is a former youth international for France.

== Career statistics ==
As of match played 24 May 2024

Appearances and goals by club, season and competition
Club	Season	League			National cup		League cup		Continental		Other		Total	
Club	Season	Division	Apps	Goals	Apps	Goals	Apps	Goals	Apps	Goals	Apps	Goals	Apps	Goals
Nancy B	2014–15	Championnat de France Amateur 2	4	0	—		—		—		—		4	0
Nancy B	2015–16	Championnat de France Amateur 2	10	5	—		—		—		—		10	5
Nancy B	2016–17	Championnat de France Amateur 2	3	1	—		—		—		—		3	1
Nancy B	Total		17	6	—		—		—		—		17	6
Nancy	2015–16	Ligue 2	4	1	0	0	1	0	—		—		5	1
Nancy	2016–17	Ligue 1	14	3	2	0	3	0	—		—		19	3
Nancy	Total		18	4	2	0	4	0	—		—		24	4
Rennes	2017–18	Ligue 1	19	0	1	0	2	0	—		—		22	0
Rennes	2019–20	Ligue 1	23	3	5	0	0	0	3	0	1	0	32	3
Rennes	2020–21	Ligue 1	23	0	1	0	—		2	0	—		26	0
Rennes	Total		65	3	7	0	2	0	5	0	1	0	80	3
Rennes B	2017–18	Championnat National 2	4	1	—		—		—		—		4	1
Rennes B	2018–19	Championnat National 3	1	0	—		—		—		—		1	0
Rennes B	Total		5	1	—		—		—		—		5	1
Nîmes B (loan)	2018–19	Championnat National 2	1	0	—		—		—		—		1	0
Nîmes (loan)	2018–19	Ligue 1	27	0	1	0	2	0	—		—		30	0
Club Brugge	2021–22	Belgian First Division A	7	0	1	0	—		1	0	0	0	9	0
Montpellier (loan)	2022–23	Ligue 1	33	5	1	0	—		—		—		34	5
Lens B	2023–24	Championnat National 3	3	0	—		—		—		3	0		
Lens (loan)	2023–24	Ligue 1	4	0	1	1	—		0	0	—		5	1
Granada (loan)	2023–24	La Liga	6	0	—		—		—		6	0		
Career total			186	19	13	1	8	0	6	0	1	0	214	20

== Honours ==
France U17

- UEFA European Under-17 Championship: 2015

France U19

- UEFA European Under-19 Championship: 2016

Individual

- UEFA European Under-19 Championship Team of the Tournament: 2016
