= Clément Lenglet =

French footballer (born 1995)

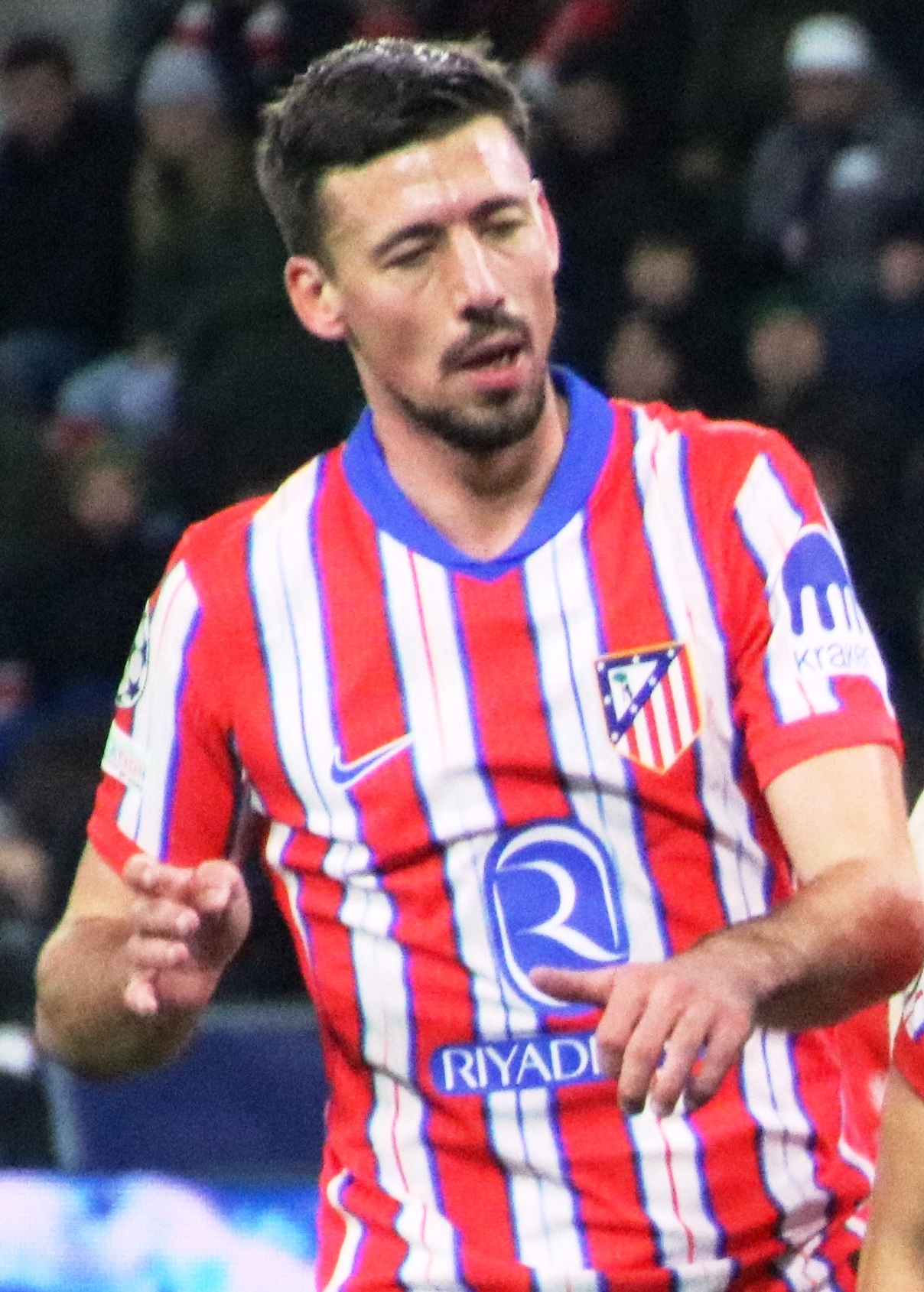
- Lenglet playing for Atlético Madrid in 2025

Personal information
- Full name: Clément Nicolas Laurent Lenglet
- Date of birth: 17 June 1995 (age 31)
- Place of birth: Beauvais, Oise, France
- Height: 1.86 m (6 ft 1 in)
- Position: Centre-back

Team information
- Current team: Benfica (on loan from Atlético Madrid)
- Number: 2

Youth career
- 2001–2007: Montchevreuil
- 2007–2010: Chantilly
- 2010–2013: Nancy

Senior career*
Years	Team	Apps	(Gls)
2012–2014	Nancy B	33	(6)
2013–2017	Nancy	77	(2)
2017–2018	Sevilla	52	(3)
2018–2025	Barcelona	105	(4)
2022–2023	→ Tottenham Hotspur (loan)	26	(0)
2023–2024	→ Aston Villa (loan)	14	(0)
2024–2025	→ Atlético Madrid (loan)	23	(2)
2025–	Atlético Madrid	19	(0)
2026–	→ Benfica (loan)	10	(1)

International career^{‡}
2010–2011	France U16	6	(0)
2011–2012	France U17	14	(0)
2012	France U18	3	(0)
2013	France U19	6	(0)
2014	France U20	2	(0)
2015–2016	France U21	10	(0)
2019–	France	16	(1)
Medal record
Men's football
Representing France
UEFA Nations League
Third place	2025 Germany
- * Club domestic league appearances and goals as of 23:28, 8 November 2026 (UTC) ‡ National team caps and goals as of 5 June 2025

Clément Nicolas Laurent Lenglet (French: [klemɑ̃ lɑ̃ɡlɛ]; born 17 June 1995) is a French professional footballer who plays as a centre-back for Primeira Liga club Benfica, on loan from La Liga club Atlético Madrid, and the France national team.

Lenglet began his career with Nancy, making 85 appearances from his debut in 2013, and winning the Ligue 2 title in the 2015–16 season. In January 2017, he joined Spanish side Sevilla for a €5.4 million fee, where he went on to make 73 appearances and score four goals in an eighteen-month spell, before joining Barcelona for €35 million in 2018.

Having previously represented France at various youth ranks, Lenglet made his debut for the senior team in 2019, and represented the nation at UEFA Euro 2020. After a hiatus from the national team from 2021 to 2025, he was recalled to the squad in May of that year.

== Club career ==
=== Nancy ===
Born in Beauvais, Oise, Lenglet grew up in Fresneaux-Montchevreuil. He made his Ligue 2 debut with Nancy on 27 September 2013 in a goalless home draw against AC Arles-Avignon entering the field after 32 minutes for Rémi Walter.

He made 34 appearances over the 2015–16 season as Nancy won the second-division title. He scored his first goal for the team on 29 January 2016, equalising in a 3–1 home win over Clermont. He was sent off on 12 February for conceding a penalty with a foul on Serhou Guirassy in a 2–2 draw at Auxerre. On 25 April, he finished Benoît Pedretti's corner kick for the only goal of a win over Sochaux at the Stade Marcel Picot, winning his team promotion to Ligue 1 after a three-year absence.

In the first half of the 2016–17 season, he made 18 starting appearances in Ligue 1 for Nancy.

=== Sevilla ===
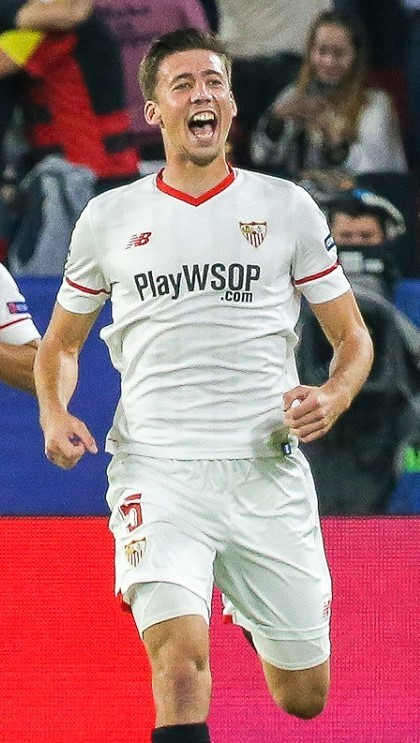
Lenglet playing for Sevilla in 2017

On 4 January 2017, Lenglet moved to Spain, signing a deal with La Liga side Sevilla until 2021. The transfer fee paid to Nancy was €5 million. He was brought in to replace compatriot Timothée Kolodziejczak, who had joined Borussia Mönchengladbach.

He made his debut for the Andalusians eight days later in a 3–3 home draw with Real Madrid in the last 16 of the 2016–17 Copa del Rey (6–3 aggregate loss). On 15 January he made his league debut against the same opponents in a 2–1 win at the Ramón Sánchez-Pizjuán Stadium that ended their 40-match unbeaten run in all competitions. He played 17 of their league fixtures in the second half of the season.

On 19 August 2017, Lenglet scored his first goal for Sevilla, opening a 1–1 home draw against Espanyol in the first game of the new season; whether or not it crossed the line became a matter of controversy after the game. He scored his first goal in European competition on 1 November, heading Éver Banega's cross to open a 2–1 home win against Spartak Moscow in the UEFA Champions League group stage. Having been part of the Sevilla side that kept a clean sheet against Manchester United in the round of 16 first leg, ESPN put Lenglet into their Champions League Best XI.

=== Barcelona ===
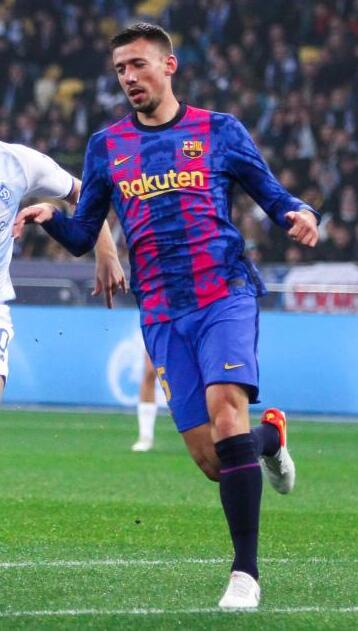
Lenglet with Barcelona in 2021

On 12 July 2018, Lenglet joined Barcelona when they triggered his release clause of €35 million. He played the full 90 minutes for Barcelona as he helped them beat his former club Sevilla 2–1 in the 2018 Supercopa de España. On 23 September, Lenglet was sent off in his La Liga debut against Girona following an elbow on Pere Pons. He scored the winning goal in their Copa del Rey game against Cultural Leonesa in a 1–0 win. He scored his first goal for Barcelona in La Liga against Real Sociedad at the Camp Nou. He provided an assist for compatriot Antoine Griezmann for Barcelona's first goal in a 3–0 win against Eibar away at the Ipurua on 19 October. Lenglet scored his first Champions League goal for the club on 8 August 2020, with a 10th minute header in a 3–1 victory at home against Napoli in Barcelona's round of 16 second leg match.

==== Loan to Tottenham Hotspur ====
On 8 July 2022, Tottenham Hotspur announced that Lenglet had joined the club on a season-long loan. Lenglet scored his first goal for Tottenham at the final group stage match against Marseille in the Champions League to help the team win 2–1, which ensured that Tottenham finished top of the group to qualify for the knock-out stage. Lenglet adapted well to Conte’s system and largely played as an essential player for the first team. Tottenham confirmed the end of Lenglet's loan spell on 15 June 2023.

==== Loan to Aston Villa ====
On 1 September 2023, Lenglet returned to the Premier League on a season-long loan with Aston Villa. In December 2023, it was reported that Barca wanted to recall Lenglet from his loan - due to the fact that Lenglet had only featured in the Conference League for Villa and had made no league appearances at that point. Lenglet went onto make his league debut on 22 December, in a 1–1 draw with Sheffield United, following an injury to Pau Torres, with Tyrone Mings already unavailable through injury.

=== Atlético Madrid ===
On 26 August 2024, Lenglet was loaned out to fellow La Liga side Atlético Madrid on a season-long deal. Later that year, on 30 November, he scored his first goal in a 5–0 away win over Real Valladolid. On 9 June 2025, Lenglet terminated his contract with Barcelona, and subsequently signed a permanent deal with Atlético, penning a three-year deal lasting until 2028.

==== Loan to Benfica ====
On 30 June 2026, Lenglet joined Primeira Liga club Benfica on loan for the 2026–27 season.

== International career ==
On 21 May 2019, Lenglet was called up to the French senior team by Didier Deschamps for a friendly match against Bolivia as well as two UEFA Euro 2020 qualifying ones gainst Andorra and Turkey, all of which were held in early June of the same year. He made his debut in a 4–0 away victory against Andorra on 11 June, and scored his first goal in the 3–0 victory of the same match on 10 September.

Upon being selected for UEFA Euro 2020, Deschamps brought Lenglet in for the last 16 match against Switzerland to play an untested 3–5–2 formation due to injuries for left-backs Lucas Hernandez and Lucas Digne. France unexpectedly lost on penalties after a 3–3 draw, with Lenglet widely blamed for the first goal, in which Haris Seferovic beat him to a header. He was replaced at half-time by Kingsley Coman.

== Personal life ==
As a boy, Lenglet was a fan of Paris Saint-Germain. Occasionally, his father took him to the Camp des Loges to watch training sessions. Lenglet says he remembers seeing “Ronaldinho, Pauleta, and other big players who made history.” Lenglet's younger brother, Corentin, is a full-back. He transferred from Nancy to Sevilla in the same deal, and spent one season in the C-team in Tercera División.

In April 2023, Lenglet participated in a $20 million investment fund for the upcoming free-to-play football video game Goals.

== Career statistics ==
=== Club ===
As of match played 8 November 2026

Appearances and goals by club, season and competition
Club	Season	League			National cup (Note: Includes Coupe de France, Copa del Rey, FA Cup)		League cup (Note: Includes Coupe de la Ligue, EFL Cup, Taça da Liga)		Europe		Other		Total	
Club	Season	Division	Apps	Goals	Apps	Goals	Apps	Goals	Apps	Goals	Apps	Goals	Apps	Goals
Nancy B	2011–12	CFA	1	0	—		—		—		—		1	0
Nancy B	2012–13	CFA	9	1	—		—		—		—		9	1
Nancy B	2013–14	CFA 2	18	4	—		—		—		—		18	4
Nancy B	2014–15	CFA 2	5	1	—		—		—		—		5	1
Nancy B	Total		33	6	—		—		—		—		33	6
Nancy	2013–14	Ligue 2	3	0	0	0	0	0	—		—		3	0
Nancy	2014–15	Ligue 2	22	0	2	0	2	0	—		—		26	0
Nancy	2015–16	Ligue 2	34	2	1	0	1	0	—		—		36	2
Nancy	2016–17	Ligue 1	18	0	0	0	2	0	—		—		20	0
Nancy	Total		77	2	3	0	5	0	—		—		85	2
Sevilla	2016–17	La Liga	17	0	1	0	—		1 (Note: Appearance(s) in UEFA Champions League)	0	—		19	0
Sevilla	2017–18	La Liga	35	3	8	0	—		11	1	—		54	4
Sevilla	Total		52	3	9	0	—		12	1	—		73	4
Barcelona	2018–19	La Liga	23	1	9	1	—		12	0	1 (Note: Appearance(s) in Supercopa de España)	0	45	2
Barcelona	2019–20	La Liga	28	2	3	1	—		9	1	0	0	40	4
Barcelona	2020–21	La Liga	33	1	5	0	—		8	0	2	0	48	1
Barcelona	2021–22	La Liga	21	0	0	0	—		6 (Note: Four appearances in UEFA Champions League, two appearances in UEFA Europa League)	0	0	0	27	0
Barcelona	Total		105	4	17	2	—		35	1	3	0	160	7
Tottenham Hotspur (loan)	2022–23	Premier League	26	0	1	0	1	0	7	1	—		35	1
Aston Villa (loan)	2023–24	Premier League	14	0	3	0	0	0	8 (Note: Appearances in UEFA Europa Conference League)	0	—		25	0
Atlético Madrid (loan)	2024–25	La Liga	23	2	4	1	—		7	0	2 (Note: Appearances in FIFA Club World Cup)	0	36	3
Atlético Madrid	2025–26	La Liga	19	0	2	0	—		3	0	0	0	24	0
Atlético Madrid	Atlético total		42	2	6	1	—		10	0	2	0	60	3
Benfica (loan)	2026–27	Primeira Liga	10	1	0	0	1	0	7 (Note: Appearances in UEFA Europa League)	1	—		18	2
Career total			359	18	39	3	7	0	79	4	5	0	489	25

=== International ===
As of match played 5 June 2025

Appearances and goals by national team and year
National team	Year	Apps	Goals
France	2019	7	1
France	2020	4	0
France	2021	4	0
France	2025	1	0
Total		16	1

As of match played 5 June 2025
France score listed first, score column indicates score after each Lenglet goal

List of international goals scored by Clément Lenglet
No.	Date	Venue	Opponent	Score	Result	Competition
1	10 September 2019	Stade de France, Saint-Denis, France	Andorra	2–0	3–0	UEFA Euro 2020 qualifying

== Honours ==
Nancy

- Ligue 2: 2015–16

Barcelona

- La Liga: 2018–19
- Copa del Rey: 2020–21; runner-up: 2018–19
- Supercopa de España: 2018

Atlético Madrid

- Copa del Rey runner-up: 2025–26

France

- UEFA Nations League third place: 2024–25
