= Youssouf Hadji =

Moroccan footballer (born 1980)

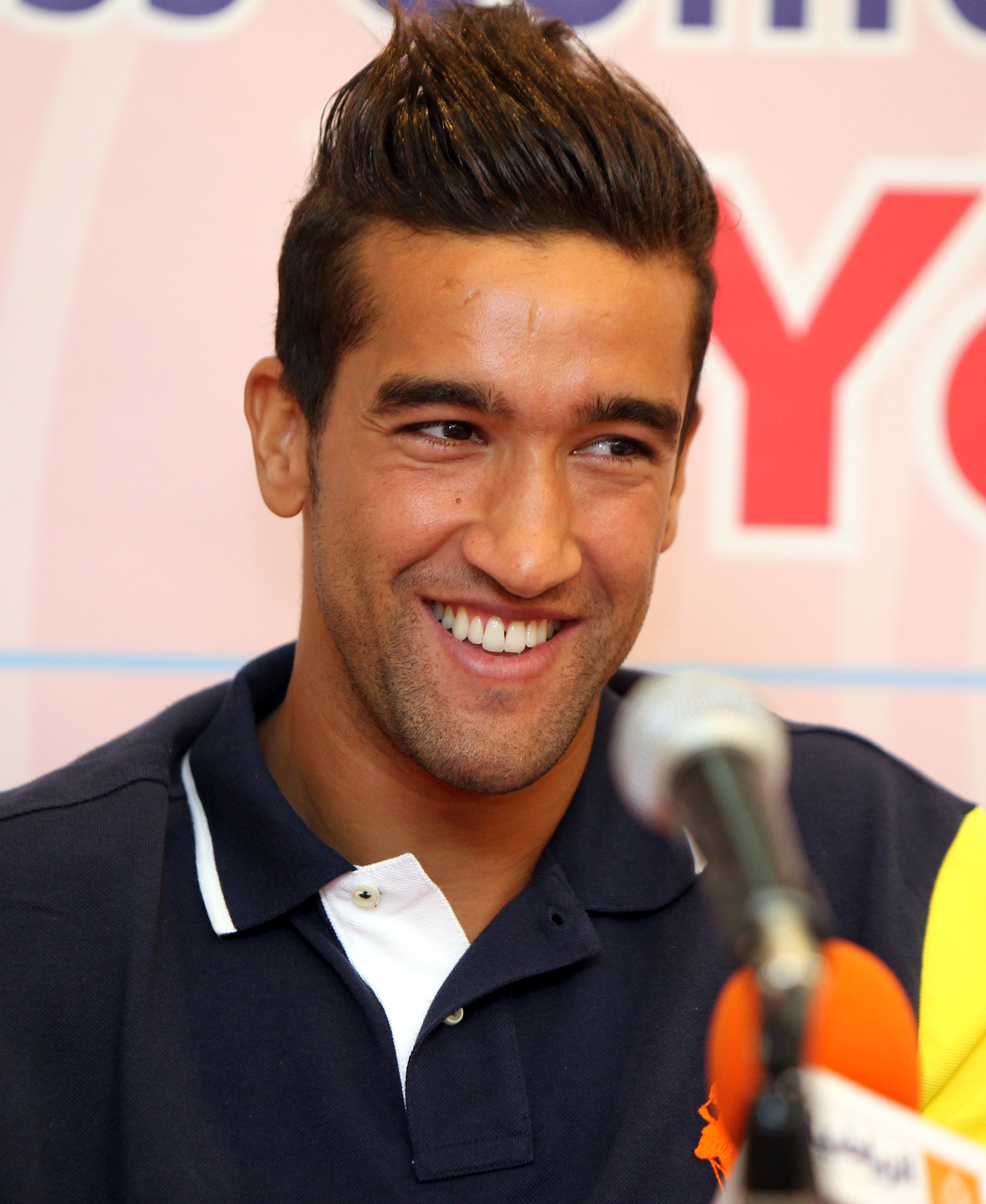
- Hadji during an interview

Personal information
- Date of birth: 25 February 1980 (age 46)
- Place of birth: Ifrane Atlas-Saghir, Morocco
- Height: 1.83 m (6 ft 0 in)
- Positions: Attacking midfielder; striker

Senior career*
Years	Team	Apps	(Gls)
1998–2003	Nancy	95	(13)
2003–2005	Bastia	61	(13)
2005–2007	Rennes	34	(3)
2007–2011	Nancy	130	(39)
2011–2012	Rennes	23	(6)
2012–2013	Al-Arabi	3	(0)
2013–2014	Elazığspor	6	(0)
2014–2018	Nancy	122	(34)
Total		474	(78)

International career
2003–2012	Morocco	64	(16)
Medal record
Men's football
Representing Morocco
Africa Cup of Nations
Runner-up	2004 Tunisia
- * Club domestic league appearances and goals

Youssouf Hadji (also spelled Youssef Hadji, Arabic: يوسف حجي, Berber languages: ⵢⵓⵙⴼ ⵃⴰⵊⵊⵉ; born 25 February 1980) is a Moroccan former professional footballer who played as an attacking midfielder. He notably had three spells for French side Nancy, also serving as the team captain, making 378 appearances and scoring 95 goals for the club. At international level, he represented the Morocco national team earning 64 caps and scoring 16 goals.

He is the younger brother of former Moroccan star Mustapha Hadji and the uncle of striker Samir Hadji. In May 2016, he won the 2015–16 Ligue 2 with Nancy.

He currently serves as a member of the technical staff of the Morocco national team, and second assistant to coach Mohamed Ouahbi.

== Career ==
=== Nancy ===
Hadji started his career at Nancy in Ligue 1 under the guidance of László Bölöni. Nancy were relegated to Ligue 2 in 2000, but Hadji remained loyal and played on for another three seasons.

=== Bastia and Rennes ===
In 2003, Hadji moved to Corsica to play for Bastia in Ligue 1. After his old team were relegated at the end of his second season there, he reunited with Bölöni at Rennes. In Brittany, he was not a regular starter but contributed largely to their season with three goals and three assists.

=== Return to Nancy ===
On 10 January 2007, Hadji re-joined Nancy from Rennes for an estimated £1.2m.

=== Rennes ===
On 31 August 2011, after four years at Nancy, Hadji returned to Rennes, for one season with the Ligue 1 team.

=== Qatar ===
Hadji signed a two-year contract with Qatari side Al-Arabi on 26 June 2012. Sidelined due to injuries for most of the season, he terminated his contract after only one season making only eight appearances in all competitions.

=== Turkey ===
Hadji signed a two-year deal with Elazığspor but he terminated his contract in February after financial problems at the club, which prevented him from receiving his wages. He returned to train with his hometown club Nancy to keep fit.

=== Third stint with Nancy ===
==== 2014–15 Ligue 2 ====
In May 2014, Hadji came back to Nancy, making it the third stint with his debut team. He stated that he wanted to help his team promote to Ligue 1 again and to retire at his hometown club. He was named as the captain of the team in the match against Brest and since then he remained captain. He scored his first goal in a 2–2 draw against Orléans on 21 December 2014. His second goal was the equalizer in a 1–1 draw against Nîmes. He scored both goals in a 2–1 home win against Brest, the club's first win since November 2014. Hadji scored another goal in a 2–0 away win against Sochaux followed by a brace in a 6–0 win against Châteauroux, although he played for only 60 minutes in the game before being substituted. Nancy achieved three consecutive wins and gained 11 points out of a possible 15 from their last five matches, thereby moving up five positions to finish sixth in Ligue 2.

==== 2015–16 Ligue 2 ====
On 3 August 2015, Hadji started the second season of his third spell at Nancy with a 0–0 draw against Tours. He assisted a goal in a 3–0 home win against Brest. He scored his first goal in his sixth appearance in the league in a 1–1 draw at the Stade Marcel Picot against Niort. Again, he recorded a second assist on 2 October in a 3–0 win against Ajaccio. He returned to scoring against Dijon in a home win, and again in an away win against Evian Thonon Gaillard at the Parc des Sports, Annecy, helping Nancy jump to the top of the Ligue 2 table. He scored a brace against Nîmes in January 2016. On 25 April 2016, Nancy were crowned as the champions of the 2015–16 Ligue 2 after a 1–0 home win against Sochaux. After the coronation, Hadji scored a brace in a 2–0 win against Tours; he recorded another assist against Evian Thonon Gaillard, who were relegated to the 2016–17 Championnat National thanks to this goal. Hadji finished the season with nine goals and three assists in 33 appearances.

==== 2016–17 Ligue 1 ====
Since the team was promoted back to Ligue 1 since their last stint on 2012–13 Season, Hadji was appointed as the team captain for the 2016–17 season. He appeared in 26 matches mostly as a substitute, but failed to score during the league season. On 10 September 2016, he recorded one assist against Lorient in the 31st minute. He scored only one goal against Besançon on the 58th minute in a 3–0 win during a 2016–17 Coupe de la Ligue match. By the end of the season, Nancy achieved the 19th position on the league table and was relegated again to Ligue 2.

==== 2017–18 Ligue 2 and last season ====
On 25 July, Hadji extended his contract for another season even though it was believed he was going to retire by the end of the 2016–17 season season. He scored four goals in five matches against Sochaux, Brest, Valenciennes and FBBP 01 respectively. On 29 September, he scored a hat-trick against Châteauroux in a 4–1 win. He scored a brace against Tours three months later. and then he did not score until the last two games of the season: the first in a 2–1 away loss against Paris FC, and the second and the last in his career in a 3–0 home win against Orléans from the penalty spot. He received a standing ovation from Nancy fans.

== Personal life ==
Hadji acquired French nationality by naturalization on 2 February 1999. Youssouf's older brother Mustapha was a Moroccan international footballer, having had a successful career in football, before ending his career in 2010. Mustapha previously played for well-known clubs such as Coventry City, Sporting and Deportivo La Coruña. He is married to hair stylist Behcia Hadji, they have two daughters together.

== Career statistics ==
=== Club ===
Appearances and goals by club, season and competition
Club	Season	League			Cup		Continental		Total	
Club	Season	Division	Apps	Goals	Apps	Goals	Apps	Goals	Apps	Goals
Nancy	1998–99	Division 1	1	0	—		—		1	0
Nancy	1999–00	Division 1	4	0	1	0	—		5	0
Nancy	2000–01	Division 2	34	6	4	2	—		38	8
Nancy	2001–02	Division 2	26	2	5	2	—		31	4
Nancy	2002–03	Ligue 2	30	5	5	2	—		35	7
Nancy	Total		95	13	15	6	—		110	19
Bastia	2003–04	Ligue 1	29	6	3	0	—		32	6
Bastia	2004–05	Ligue 1	32	7	3	0	—		35	7
Bastia	Total		61	13	6	0	—		67	13
Rennes	2005–06	Ligue 1	21	3	1	0	3	1	25	4
Rennes	2006–07	Ligue 1	13	0	2	0	—		15	0
Rennes	Total		34	3	3	0	3	1	40	4
Nancy	2006–07	Ligue 1	14	1	—		—		14	1
Nancy	2007–08	Ligue 1	24	7	3	0	—		27	7
Nancy	2008–09	Ligue 1	36	11	2	0	2	0	40	11
Nancy	2009–10	Ligue 1	26	11	2	0	—		28	11
Nancy	2010–11	Ligue 1	26	8	2	0	—		28	8
Nancy	2011–12	Ligue 1	4	1	1	0	—		5	1
Nancy	Total		130	39	10	0	2	0	142	39
Rennes	2011–12	Ligue 1	23	6	4	1	6	1	33	8
Al-Arabi	2012–13	Qatar Stars League	3	0	1	1	—		4	1
Elazığspor	2013–14	Süper Lig	6	0	4	0	—		10	0
Nancy	2014–15	Ligue 2	31	14	3	2	—		34	16
Nancy	2015–16	Ligue 2	33	9	0	0	—		33	9
Nancy	2016–17	Ligue 1	26	0	1	1	—		27	1
Nancy	2017–18	Ligue 2	32	11	0	0	—		32	11
Nancy	Total		122	34	4	3	0	0	126	37
Career total			474	108	47	11	11	2	532	121

=== International ===
Scores and results list Morocco's goal tally first, score column indicates score after each Hadji goal.

List of international goals scored by Youssouf Hadji
No.	Date	Venue	Opponent	Score	Result	Competition
1	27 January 2004	Stade Mustapha Ben Jannet, Monastir, Tunisia	Nigeria	1–0	1–0	2004 African Cup of Nations
2	8 February 2004	Stade Taïeb El Mhiri, Sfax, Tunisia	Algeria	2–1	3–1	2004 African Cup of Nations
3	11 February 2004	Stade Olympique de Sousse, Sousse, Tunisia	Mali	3–0	4–0	2004 African Cup of Nations
4	9 February 2005	Stade Moulay Abdellah, Rabat, Morocco	Kenya	4–0	5–1	2006 World Cup qualification
5	26 March 2005	Stade Moulay Abdellah, Rabat, Morocco	Guinea	1–0	1–0	2006 World Cup qualification
6	4 June 2005	Stade Moulay Abdellah, Rabat, Morocco	Malawi	2–1	4–1	2006 World Cup qualification
7	4 June 2005	Stade Moulay Abdellah, Rabat, Morocco	Malawi	4–1	4–1	2006 World Cup qualification
8	17 January 2006	Stade Moulay Abdellah, Morocco	Angola	2–0	2–2	Friendly
9	16 August 2006	Stade Moulay Abdellah, Morocco	Burkina Faso	1–0	1–0	Friendly
10	25 March 2007	National Sports Stadium, Harare, Zimbabwe	Zimbabwe	1–0	1–1	2008 Africa Cup of Nations qualification
11	2 June 2007	Stade Mohamed V, Casablanca, Morocco	Zimbabwe	2–0	2–0	2008 Africa Cup of Nations qualification
12	11 October 2008	Stade Moulay Abdellah, Rabat, Morocco	Mauritania	2–0	4–1	2010 World Cup Qualification
13	11 October 2008	Stade Moulay Abdellah, Rabat, Morocco	Mauritania	3–0	4–1	2010 World Cup Qualification
14	11 August 2010	Stade Moulay Abdellah, Morocco	Equatorial Guinea	1–1	2–1	Friendly
15	11 August 2010	Stade Moulay Abdellah, Morocco	Equatorial Guinea	2–1	2–1	Friendly
16	4 June 2011	Stade de Marrakech, Marrakesh, Morocco	Algeria	3–0	4–0	2012 Africa Cup of Nations qualification

== Honours ==
Nancy

- Ligue 2: 2015–16

Morocco

- Africa Cup of Nations runner-up: 2004

Individual

- Ligue 2 Top scorer: 2014–15 (with 13 goals)
