= Diallo Guidileye =

Mauritanian footballer (born 1989)

Personal information
- Full name: Diallo Guidileye
- Date of birth: 30 December 1989 (age 36)
- Place of birth: Djadjibiné, Mauritania
- Height: 1.81 m (5 ft 11 in)
- Position: Midfielder

Youth career
- 2003–2005: Poissy
- 2005–2007: Troyes

Senior career*
Years	Team	Apps	(Gls)
2007–2011	Troyes	94	(3)
2011–2014	Brest	32	(0)
2013	→ Châteauroux (loan)	10	(1)
2014–2015	AEL Limassol	25	(1)
2015–2017	Nancy	54	(0)
2017–2018	Gençlerbirliği	18	(1)
2018	Keşla FK	8	(0)
2019	Elazığspor	7	(0)
2019–2020	FUS Rabat	4	(0)

International career
2009	France U20	4	(0)
2013–	Mauritania	19	(1)
- * Club domestic league appearances and goals

Diallo Guidileye (born 30 December 1989) is a Mauritanian former professional footballer who played as a midfielder.

== Club career ==
Guidileye began his career playing for AS Poissy, in the western suburbs of Paris, before moving to Troyes AC on a youth contract. After impressing during training sessions, he was called up to the first team and made his professional debut, at the age of 17, on 30 November 2007, in a Ligue 2 match against Boulogne-sur-Mer. He started the match playing the full 90 minutes, picking up a yellow card in the process. Guidileye went on to become a staple of the starting eleven, appearing in every following match that season. Midway through the season, Guidileye agreed to his first professional contract signing three-year contract with the club.

His surprising success at Troyes have attracted several Ligue 1 clubs to scout him. OGC Nice, Paris Saint-Germain, Bordeaux, and Saint-Étienne have all declared their interest in the young midfielder. On 9 October 2009, Guidileye scored his first career league goal in a 4–0 victory over Évian.

In January 2011, Guidileye joined Stade Brestois 29, but remained on loan at Troyes until the end of the season. His 2011–2012 season with Brest was limited due to injuries: he could only participate to 6 games. In January 2013, he was loaned out to Ligue 2 club LB Chateauroux, for whom he played 10 league games. For the 2013–2014 season, he returned to Brest, who had been relegated to Ligue 2 in the meantime.

On the last day of the 2019 January transfer window, Guidileye was one of 22 players on two hours, that signed for Turkish club Elazığspor. They had been placed under a transfer embargo but managed to negotiate it with the Turkish FA, leading to them going on a mad spree of signing and registering a load of players despite not even having a permanent manager in place. In just two hours, they managed to snap up a record 22 players - 12 coming in on permanent contracts and a further 10 joining on loan deals until the end of the season.

In July 2019, Diallo joined Fath Union Sport.

== International career ==
Though Guidileye was born in Mauritania, he has dual citizenship and thus can represent France on the national level. He has played for the France U-19 squad and recently was called up to participate in a training camp for future France under-21 players. On 25 May 2009, he was selected to the under-20 squad to participate in the 2009 Mediterranean Games.

In 2012, the French coach of Mauritania, Patrice Neveu, said he had reached an agreement with Guidileye to represent the senior national team from his country of origin in the future.

=== Goals ===
Scores and results list Mauritania's goal tally first.

Goal	Date	Venue	Opponent	Score	Result	Competition
1.	2 September 2016	Mbombela Stadium, Nelspruit, South Africa	South Africa	1–0	1–1	2017 Africa Cup of Nations qualification
2.	19 November 2019	Stade Cheikha Ould Boïdiya, Nouakchott, Mauritania	Central African Republic	2–0	2–0	2021 Africa Cup of Nations qualification
