= Maurice Dalé =

French footballer (born 1985)

Personal information
- Full name: Maurice Junior Dalé
- Date of birth: 12 July 1985 (age 41)
- Place of birth: Martigues, France
- Height: 1.87 m (6 ft 2 in)
- Position: Striker

Team information
- Current team: ES Fosséenne

Senior career*
Years	Team	Apps	(Gls)
2005–2008	Martigues	73	(17)
2007	→ Le Pontet (loan)	14	(2)
2008–2009	Auxerre	1	(0)
2009–2010	Arles-Avignon	34	(10)
2010–2011	Unirea Urziceni	2	(0)
2010–2011	→ Panserraikos (loan)	29	(2)
2011–2012	Nantes	8	(1)
2012	→ Arles-Avignon (loan)	17	(5)
2012–2014	Arles-Avignon	55	(15)
2014–2017	Nancy	98	(21)
2017–2018	Giresunspor	15	(4)
2018–2019	Nancy	27	(2)
2020	Martigues	6	(0)
2020–	ES Fosséenne	0	(0)
- * Club domestic league appearances and goals as of 1 July 2019

Maurice Junior Dalé (born 12 July 1985) is a French professional footballer who plays as a striker for ES Fosséenne.

== Career ==
The French-Ivorian began his career with FC Martigues, where he played until 2008 while spending 2007 on loan at US Le Pontet.

In July 2008, Dalé joined AJ Auxerre, where he played his first professional match in the Ligue 1 on 13 December 2008 against Paris Saint-Germain.

On 7 August 2009, AC Arles-Avignon signed the forward from AJ Auxerre.

After one season with Arles-Avignon, Dalé signed for Unirea Urziceni. Due to financial problems of Unirea Urziceni, Dalé on 25 August 2010 agreed to go on loan to Panserraikos F.C. for one year. On 3 October 2010, he scored his first goal for Panserraikos in a 1–0 home win of his team against AEL.

After two-year stint at Romania and Greece, he returned to France and joined FC Nantes on 28 June 2011. In 2014, Dalé signed with Nancy. In the 2016–17 season he made 25 Ligue 1 appearances scoring three goals while Nancy suffered relegation.

In July 2017, Dalé joined Giresunspor of the TFF First League, the Turkish second tier, on a two-year contract with the option of a third.

After returning to FC Martigues in January 2020, Dalé moved to ES Fosséenne in the summer 2020.
