= Alexis Busin =

French footballer (born 1995)

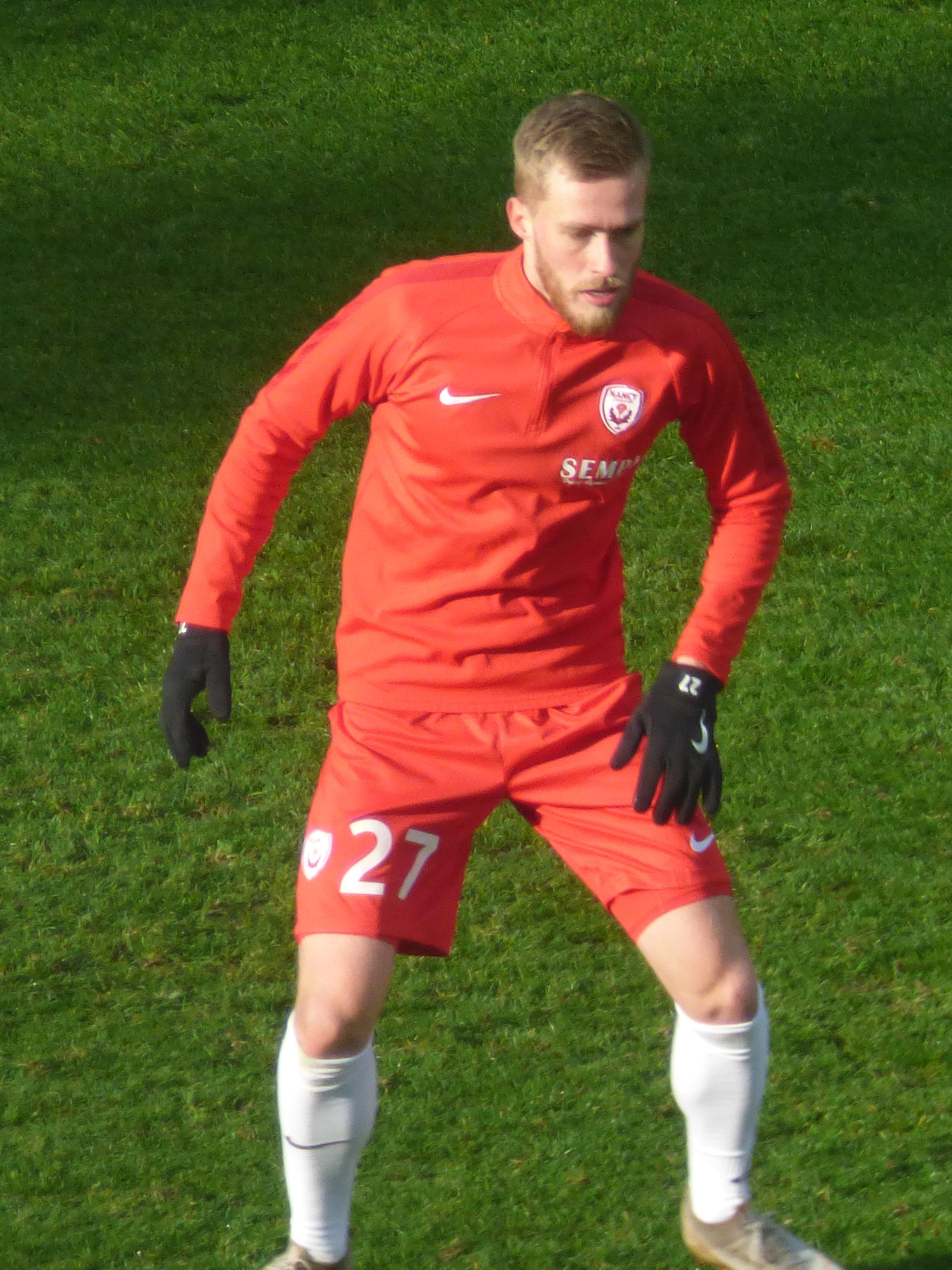
- Busin in 2019

Personal information
- Date of birth: 7 September 1995 (age 31)
- Place of birth: Saint-Martin-Boulogne, France
- Height: 1.76 m (5 ft 9 in)
- Position: Midfielder

Youth career
- 2001–2008: Le Touquet
- 2008–2010: Boulogne
- 2010–2014: Nancy

Senior career*
Years	Team	Apps	(Gls)
2012–2019	Nancy B	68	(23)
2014–2019	Nancy	68	(7)
2016–2017	→ Clermont (loan)	6	(0)
2020–2021	Avranches	16	(4)
2020–2021	Avranches B	5	(1)
2022	Boulogne B	2	(0)
2022–2025	Boulogne	58	(7)
- * Club domestic league appearances and goals as of 18 May 2025

Alexis Busin (born 7 September 1995) is a French professional footballer who plays as a midfielder.

== Career ==
Busin is a youth exponent from AS Nancy. He made his Ligue 2 debut on 6 May 2014 against Stade Lavallois replacing Thomas Ayasse after 77 minutes in a 1–0 away defeat. Three days later, he scored his first league goal against Angers SCO. On 29 May 2015 he signed his first professional, three-year, contract with the club.

18 July 2016, Nancy announced Busin would join Clermont Foot on loan. The loan was terminated early, January 2017, due to lack of playing time.

Busin left Nancy in the summer of 2019, at the end of his contract. After six months without a club he joined US Avranches in January 2020, on a contract until the end of the 2019–20 season.

On 27 January 2022, Busin signed with Boulogne.
