= Modou Diagne =

Senegalese footballer (born 1994)

Personal information
- Full name: Modou Makhtar Diagne
- Date of birth: 3 January 1994 (age 32)
- Place of birth: Mbacké, Senegal
- Height: 1.88 m (6 ft 2 in)
- Position: Centre-back

Youth career
- 2006–2007: FC Sainte-Marguerite
- 2007–2013: Nancy

Senior career*
Years	Team	Apps	(Gls)
2012–2019	Nancy B	61	(3)
2013–2019	Nancy	101	(4)
2019–2021	Charleroi	25	(1)
2021–2022	Olympiakos Nicosia	21	(0)
2022–2023	Al-Khor	5	(1)
2023–2024	Pirin Blagoevgrad	11	(0)
2024	FC U Craiova	0	(0)

International career
2013	France U20	1	(0)
2015	Senegal U23	3	(0)
- * Club domestic league appearances and goals as of 6 December 2024

Modou Makhtar Diagne (born 3 January 1994) is a Senegalese professional footballer who plays as a centre-back.

As a youth, he was capped for the France U20 team, but switched to Senegal U23 team for the 2015 Africa U-23 Cup of Nations. He also holds French citizenship.

== Honours ==
Nancy

- Ligue 2: 2015–16
