= Issiar Dia =

Footballer (born 1987)

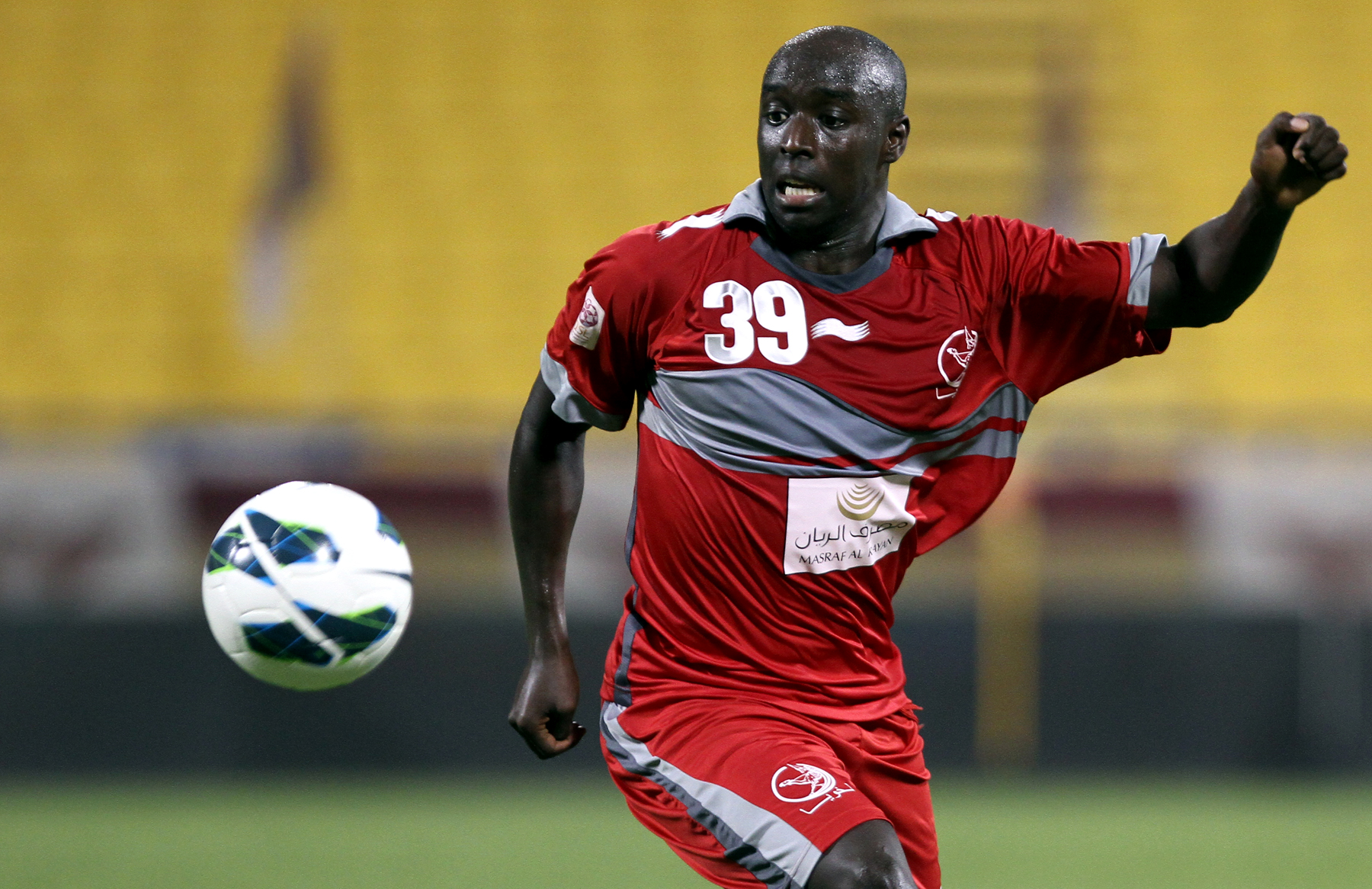
- Dia in 2012

Personal information
- Full name: Issiar Dia
- Date of birth: 8 June 1987 (age 39)
- Place of birth: Sèvres, France
- Height: 1.72 m (5 ft 8 in)
- Position: Winger

Youth career
- 1995–2001: Boulogne-Billancourt
- 2000–2002: → INF Clairefontaine
- 2001–2002: Montrouge
- 2002–2003: Boulogne-Billancourt
- 2003–2004: Amiens

Senior career*
Years	Team	Apps	(Gls)
2004–2006	Amiens	45	(8)
2006–2010	Nancy	115	(13)
2010–2012	Fenerbahçe	41	(5)
2012–2015	Lekhwiya	28	(3)
2014–2015	→ Al Kharaitiyat SC (loan)	19	(2)
2015	Gazélec Ajaccio	11	(0)
2016	Al Kharaitiyat SC	0	(0)
2016–2017	Nancy	31	(8)
2017–2019	Yeni Malatyaspor	14	(0)

International career^{‡}
2004–2005	France U18	1	(0)
2005–2006	France U19	11	(2)
2006–2008	France U21	3	(0)
2008–2013	Senegal	21	(2)
- * Club domestic league appearances and goals as of 22:16, 15 April 2017 (UTC) ‡ National team caps and goals as of 15 October 2008

Issiar Dia (born 8 June 1987) is a former professional footballer who played as a winger. Born in France, he represented Senegal at international level.

== Club career ==
=== Nancy ===
In summer 2006, Dia joined AS Nancy from SC Amiens for a €2 million transfer fee. On 10 September 2006, he made his Ligue 1 debut in a match against Toulouse FC replacing Monsef Zerka in the 68th minute. 18 days later, he scored on his international debut in a 3–1 return leg win against tournament favourites FC Schalke 04 in the first round of the UEFA Cup; he was involved in all three goals.

In his first spell at AS Nancy, he made a total of 115 league appearances scoring 13 goals with 8 of those coming in his last season at the club.

=== Fenerbahçe ===
On 21 July 2010, Fenerbahçe announced that Dia had joined the team on a four-year contract for a sum of €8 million. He ended a long scoring drought on 5 February 2011 with a goal against Manisaspor, as Fenerbahçe won 3–1 in the dying minutes of the game. After a two-year spell with the Turkish club, he joined Qatari champions Lekhwiya SC.

=== Nancy ===
On 31 August 2016, Dia returned to Nancy on a one-year deal. He left the club at the end of the season.

=== Yeni Malatyaspor ===
On 1 July 2017, Dia returned to Turkey and signed a three-year deal with Yeni Malatyaspor.

== International career ==
Dia represented the France under-18 and France under-19 teams before also playing for the France under-21 team. He subsequently chose to represent the Senegal national team in 2008.

On 8 June 2008, Dia made his debut for Senegal in a match against Gambia. On 17 November 2010, he scored his first international goal in a friendly match against Gabon, helping Senegal secure a 2–1 victory.

In January 2012, Dia participated in the 2012 Africa Cup of Nations. Senegal were drawn in Group A alongside Zambia, Equatorial Guinea, and Libya. However, Senegal lost all three of their group-stage matches and were eliminated from the tournament.

== Career statistics ==
=== Club ===
As of 15 April 2017

Appearances and goals by club, season and competition
Club	Season	League			Cup (Note: Includes Coupe de France, Coupe de la Ligue, Turkish Cup, Qatari Stars Cup)		Continental (Note: Includes UEFA Champions League, UEFA Europa League, AFC Champions League)		Total	
Club	Season	Division	App	Goals	App	Goals	App	Goals	App	Goals
Amiens	2004–05	Ligue 2	14	0	0	0	0	0	14	0
Amiens	2005–06	Ligue 2	29	8	3	0	0	0	32	8
Amiens	2006–07	Ligue 2	2	0	1	0	0	0	3	0
Amiens	Total		45	8	4	0	0	0	49	8
Nancy	2006–07	Ligue 1	15	1	3	1	6	1	24	3
Nancy	2007–08	Ligue 1	31	1	3	1	0	0	34	2
Nancy	2008–09	Ligue 1	24	3	3	0	5	0	32	3
Nancy	2009–10	Ligue 1	33	8	2	1	0	0	35	9
Nancy	Total		103	13	11	3	11	1	125	17
Fenerbahçe	2010–11	Süper Lig	25	2	3	0	1	0	29	2
Fenerbahçe	2011–12	Süper Lig	16	3	3	1	0	0	19	4
Fenerbahçe	Total		41	5	6	1	1	0	48	6
Lekhwiya	2012–13	Qatar Stars League	16	3	0	0	7	2	23	5
Lekhwiya	2013–14	Qatar Stars League	12	0	3	2	1	0	16	2
Lekhwiya	Total		28	3	3	2	8	2	39	7
Al Kharaitiyat SC	2014–15	Qatar Stars League	19	2	0	0	0	0	19	2
Al Kharaitiyat SC	2015–16	Qatar Stars League	11	1	0	0	0	0	11	1
Al Kharaitiyat SC	Total		30	3	0	0	0	0	30	3
Gazélec Ajaccio	2015–16	Ligue 1	11	0	1	0	0	0	12	0
Nancy	2016–17	Ligue 1	31	8	3	0	0	0	34	8
Yeni Malatyaspor	2017-18	Süper Lig	12	0	3	0	0	0	15	0
Yeni Malatyaspor	2018-19	Süper Lig	2	0	2	0	0	0	4	0
Yeni Malatyaspor	Total		14	0	5	0	0	0	19	0
Career total			303	40	33	6	20	3	356	49

=== International ===
Scores and results list Senegal's goal tally first, score column indicates score after each Dia goal.

List of international goals scored by Issiar Dia
No.	Date	Venue	Opponent	Score	Result	Competition
	17 November 2010	Saint Gratien	Gabon		2–1	Friendly

== Honours ==
Fenerbahçe

- Süper Lig: 2010–11
- Turkish Cup: 2011–12
