= Jacques Rousselot =

Jacques Rousselot (French: [ʒak ʁuslo]; born 6 December 1949 in Pont-Saint-Vincent) is a French businessman and former president of French football club AS Nancy having served in this role from 1994 to 2020. He was the chief executive officer of E. Leclerc Voyages an online travel agency, before leaving the position to devote his time more to football. Rousselot is also a vice-president of the French Football Federation and serves on the federation's Federal Council.
