= Julien Cétout =

French footballer (born 1988)

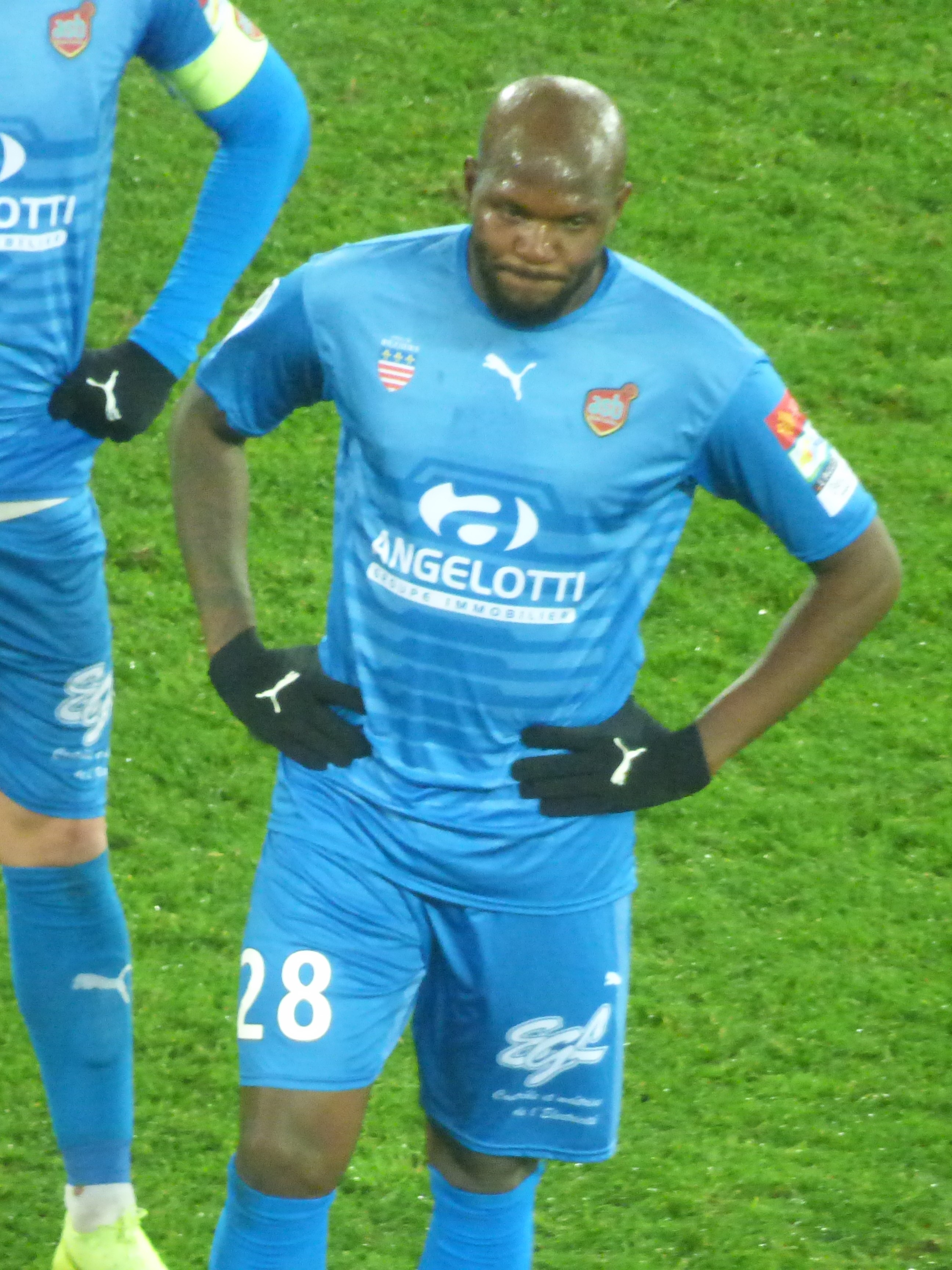
- Cétout with Béziers in 2019

Personal information
- Date of birth: 2 January 1988 (age 38)
- Place of birth: Chartres, France
- Height: 1.83 m (6 ft 0 in)
- Position: Right-back

Youth career
- 2000–2003: FC Chartres
- 2003–2004: Clairefontaine
- 2004–2005: Saint-Étienne

Senior career*
Years	Team	Apps	(Gls)
2005–2008	Saint-Étienne B	50	(3)
2008–2014	Tours	168	(3)
2014–2018	Nancy	113	(7)
2018	Hapoel Be'er Sheva	2	(0)
2019	Béziers	10	(1)
2020–2022	US Mondorf-les-Bains	35	(1)
Total		378	(15)
- * Club domestic league appearances and goals

Julien Cétout (born 2 January 1988) is a French former professional footballer who played as a right-back.

== Career ==
Having spent a number of years at both Tours FC and AS Nancy, Cétout joined Béziers in January 2019, after having his contract cancelled by Hapoel Be'er Sheva.

== Personal life ==
Born in metropolitan France, Cetout is of Guadeloupean descent.
