= Tobias Badila =

Congolese footballer

Personal information
- Full name: Tobias Badila
- Date of birth: 12 May 1994 (age 32)
- Place of birth: Dijon, France
- Height: 1.81 m (5 ft 11 in)
- Position: Left-back

Team information
- Current team: Nancy
- Number: 3

Youth career
- –2013: Nancy

Senior career*
Years	Team	Apps	(Gls)
2011–	Nancy B	72	(3)
2013–	Nancy	80	(3)

International career^{‡}
2017–	Republic of the Congo	1	(0)
- * Club domestic league appearances and goals as of 01:24, 2 February 2019 (UTC) ‡ National team caps and goals as of 14 June 2017

Tobias Badila (born 12 May 1993) is a footballer who currently plays for French Ligue 2 side AS Nancy as a left back. Born in France, he represents Republic of the Congo at international level.

== Career ==
Badila is a youth exponent from AS Nancy. He made his Ligue 2 debut on 21 February 2014 in a 2–0 away defeat against Troyes AC playing the first 79 minutes of the game before being substituted for Romain Grange. He can perform both centre-back or left-back, because of his great physique. At points in his career he was watched by teams such as AS Saint-Etienne, Monaco and Arsenal, although he preferred to stay to continue his progress.

== International career ==
Badila was pre-selected by Congo on 19 May 2017, and played 4 matches. He made his senior debut for the Republic of the Congo in a 3–1 2019 Africa Cup of Nations qualification loss to the DR Congo on 10 June 2017.
