= Joffrey Cuffaut =

French footballer (born 1988)

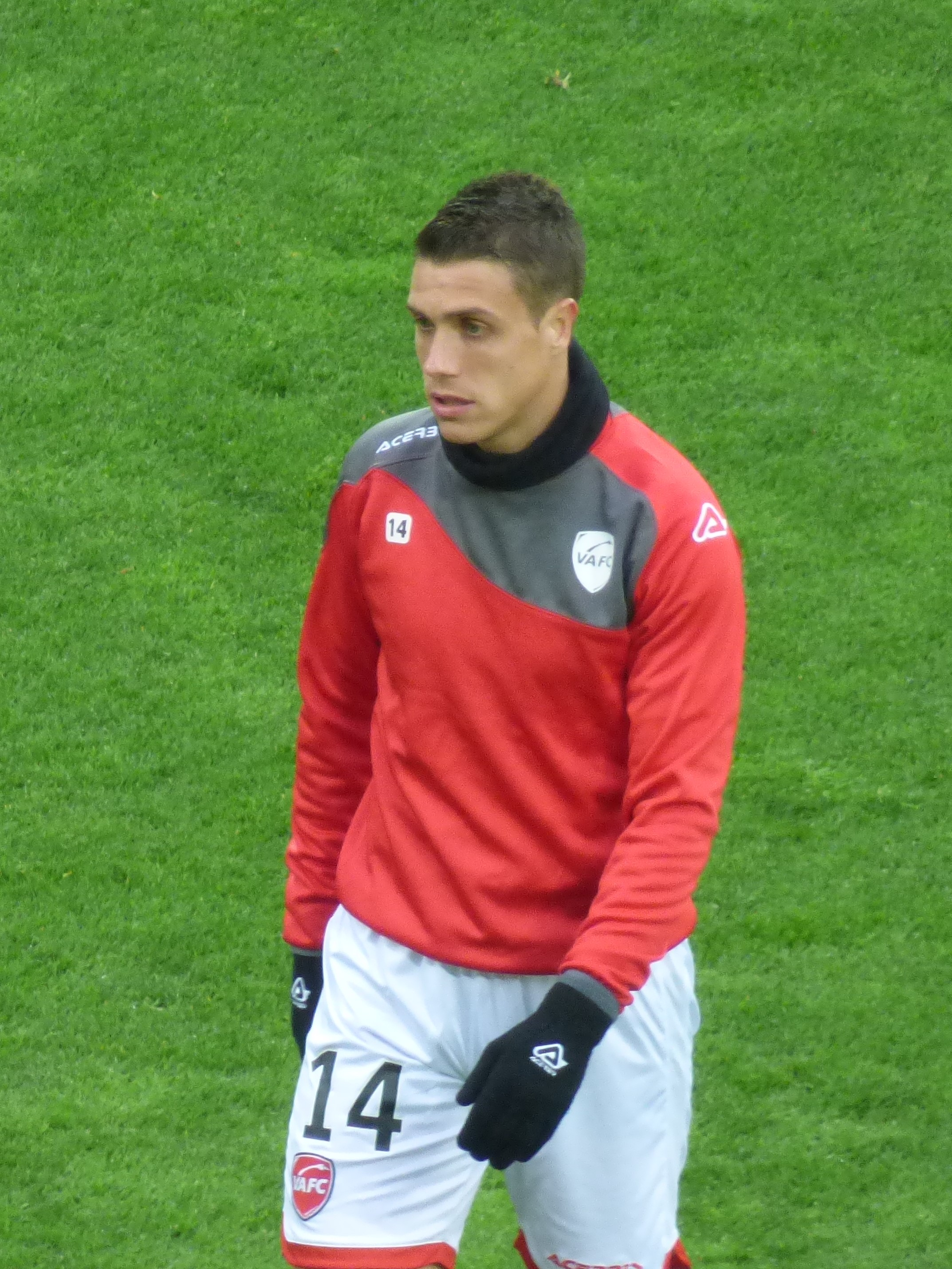
- Cuffaut in 2019

Personal information
- Date of birth: 15 March 1988 (age 38)
- Place of birth: Méru, France
- Height: 1.78 m (5 ft 10 in)
- Position: Right-back

Youth career
- 2004–2005: Auxerre
- 2005–2006: Beauvais

Senior career*
Years	Team	Apps	(Gls)
2006–2010	Beauvais	56	(0)
2010–2013	Le Mans	62	(1)
2010–2011	Le Mans B	5	(0)
2013–2018	Nancy	134	(5)
2015	Nancy B	2	(0)
2018–2024	Valenciennes	160	(21)
- * Club domestic league appearances and goals as of 16 June 2024

Joffrey Cuffaut (born 15 March 1988) is a French professional footballer who plays as a right-back.
