= List of Morocco football players in foreign leagues =

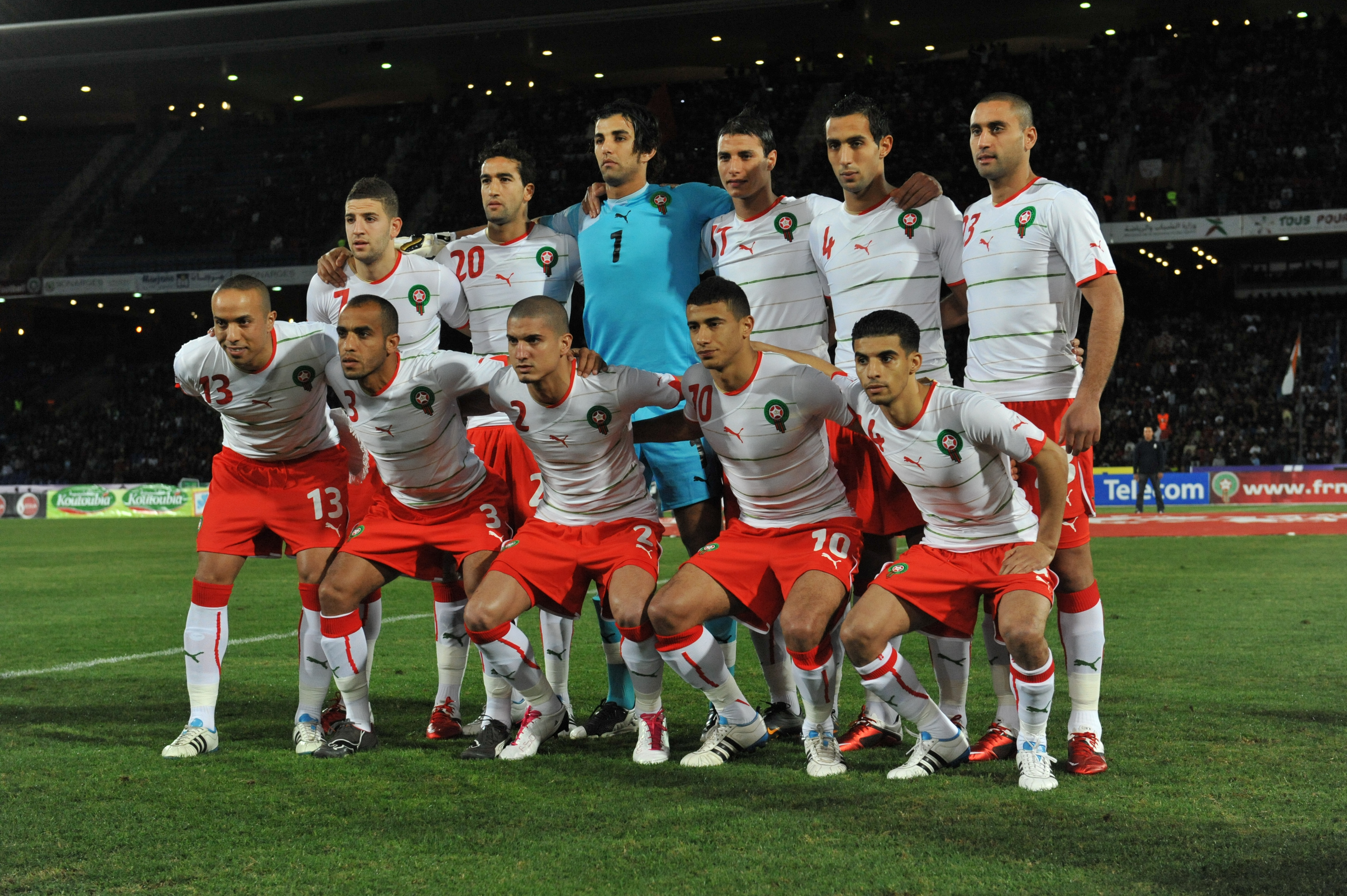
Morocco national football team From Left to Right: Stand Up : Adel Taarabt (QPR) - Hadji (AS Nancy) - Lamyaghri (Wydad Casablanca) - Chamakh (Arsenal) - Benatia (Udinese) - () Sitting Kharja (Inter Milan) (C) - El Kaddouri (Dynamo Kyiv) - Basser (AS Nancy) - Belhanda (Montpellier) - Boussoufa (Anderlecht).

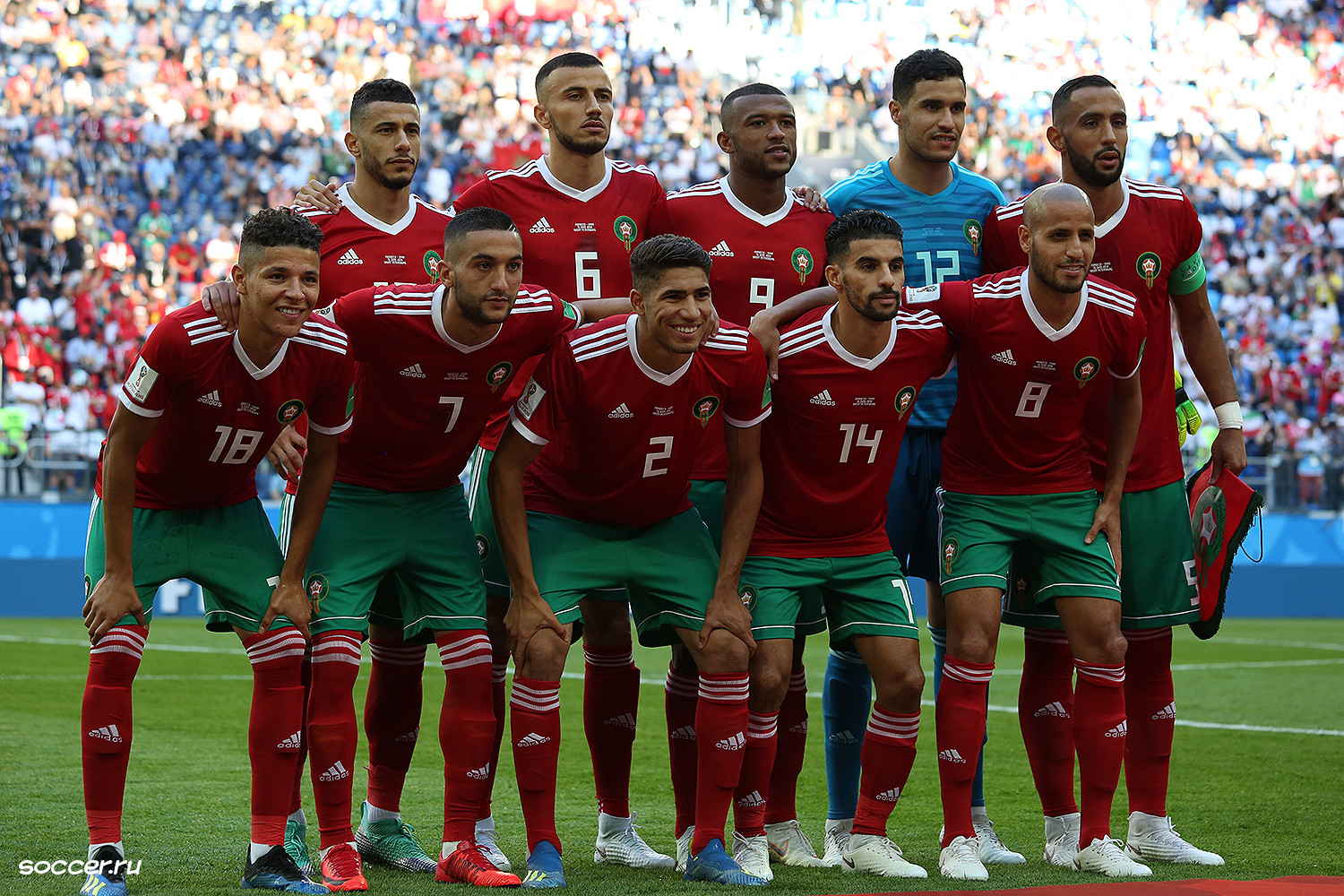
Morocco national football team From Left to Right: Stand Up : Belhanda (Galatasaray) - Saïss (Wolverhampton Wanderers) - El Kaabi (RS Berkane) - Mohamedi (Numancia) - Benatia (Juventus) (C) Sitting Harit (Schalke 04) - Ziyech (CFC) - Hakimi (Paris Saint Germain) - Boussoufa (Al-Jazira) - El Ahmadi (Feyenoord).

This is a complete List of Moroccan football players in foreign leagues, i.e. association football players who have played in foreign leagues.

== The history of Moroccan players in Europe ==
A large number of Moroccan players played in Europe, especially in France, Belgium and the Netherlands due to the presence of a large Moroccan community there, In the 1950s, there was a Moroccan player who impressed in Europe, especially with Atlético Madrid, who was Larbi Benbarek even though he was playing with the France national team because Morocco was under French protection, Benbarek won La Liga title twice in 1949–50 and 1950–51. In the fifties and beginning of the sixties another Moroccan star appeared Hassan Akesbi, is considered the best Moroccan scorer in European Leagues with 173 goals and the first Moroccan to win a title in Europe when Akesbi won Ligue 1 title with Reims in 1962.

In terms of titles, a large number of Moroccan players achieved titles most of them Badr El Kaddouri with 14 titles five Leagues, four cups and five Super Cup, followed by Sofian Benzouien with 10 titles, all in Luxembourg with F91 Dudelange with seven Leagues more than any other Moroccan player and three cups. Then comes Younès Belhanda with 9 titles five Leagues, three cups and one Super Cup. In terms of the five major Leagues Medhi Benatia won the Bundesliga twice with Bayern Munich and Serie A twice with Juventus More than any other Moroccan player, As for the other players who achieved the league titles in the top 5 leagues in Europe, Salaheddine Bassir and Noureddine Naybet won La Liga in 1999–2000 with Deportivo La Coruña and Ligue 1 six times was won by Hassan Akesbi, Marouane Chamakh and three players in 2011–12 they are Abdelhamid El Kaoutari, Karim Aït-Fana, Younès Belhanda with Montpellier, and the last winner was Nabil Dirar in 2016–17.

At the level of individual titles Mbark Boussoufa won the award for best player in Belgium three times, The first with Gent as for the second and third with Anderlecht, in the Netherlands, the Moroccan players won the award for the best player three times through Mounir El Hamdaoui, Karim El Ahmadi and Hakim Ziyech. as for the level scorers There are five players who have won the top scorer El Hamdaoui is the first Moroccan to achieve the top scorer award in the Eredivisie with AZ Alkmaar season 2008–09. As for more who won the top scorer award, he is Omar Er Rafik twice in Luxembourg with FC Differdange 03. as for more than play games just in the leagues there Karim El Ahmadi with 376 games, Abdelkrim Merry 337 games, Marouane Chamakh 333 games, Noureddine Naybet 329 games and finally Mbark Boussoufa 322 games. on the other hand more than hat-tricks record is Samir Hadji 8 all hat-tricks with Fola Esch then Omar Er Rafik by 7 and finally Hassan Akesbi by 6 hat-tricks. At the level of countries have made Moroccan players 29 titles in the Netherlands, which are thirteen Eredivisie, ten KNVB Cup and six Johan Cruijff-schaal after that Luxembourg twenty one title, fourteen League and seven cups and finally Portugal nineteen titles, eight Primeira Liga, one Taça de Portugal, Taça da Liga and five Supertaça. Other countries where the Moroccan players at least won one title is the 17th state in the following figure Azerbaijan, Belgium, Bulgaria, Cyprus, Germany, Greece, Hungary, Italy, Portugal, Romania, Switzerland, Ukraine, Spain, Moldova, Poland, Slovakia, Denmark, Russia and Turkey.

== Gallery ==
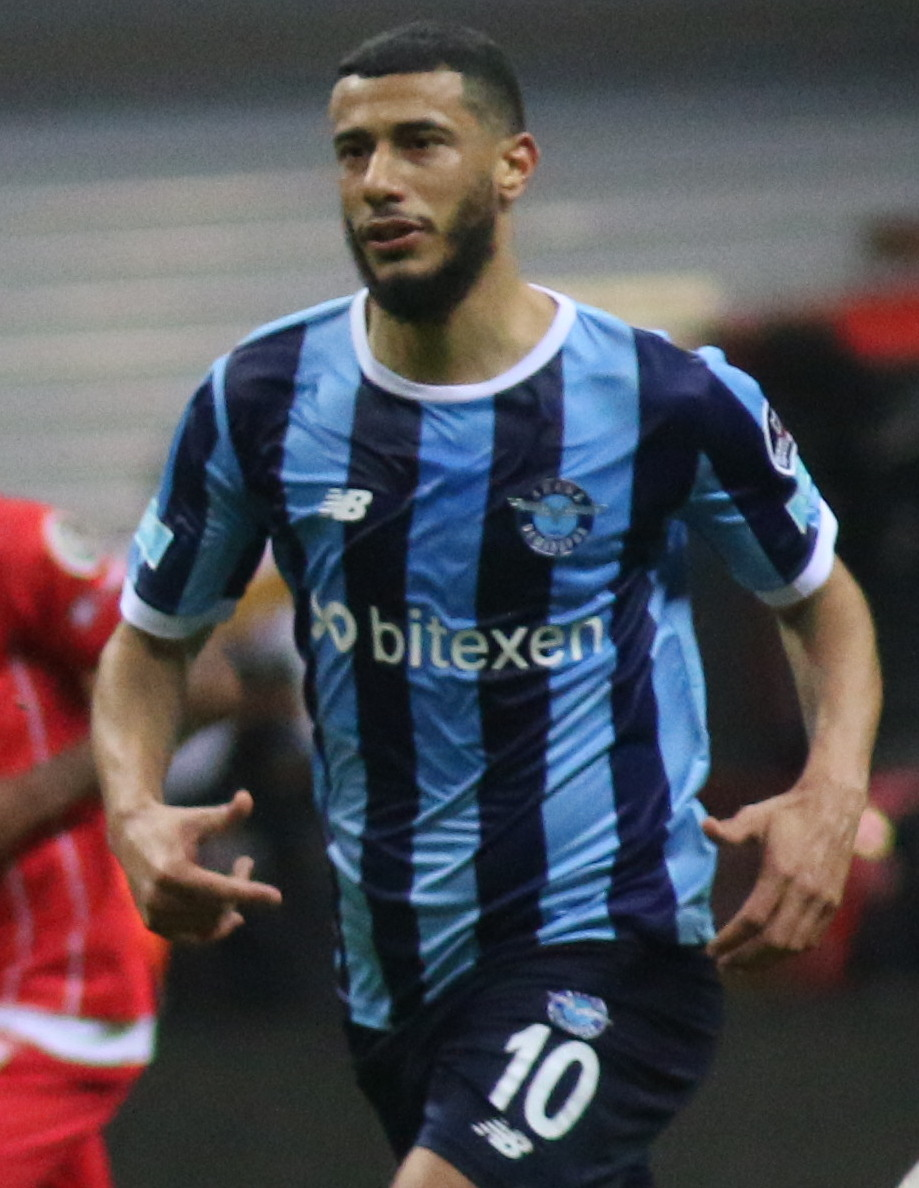
Younès Belhanda

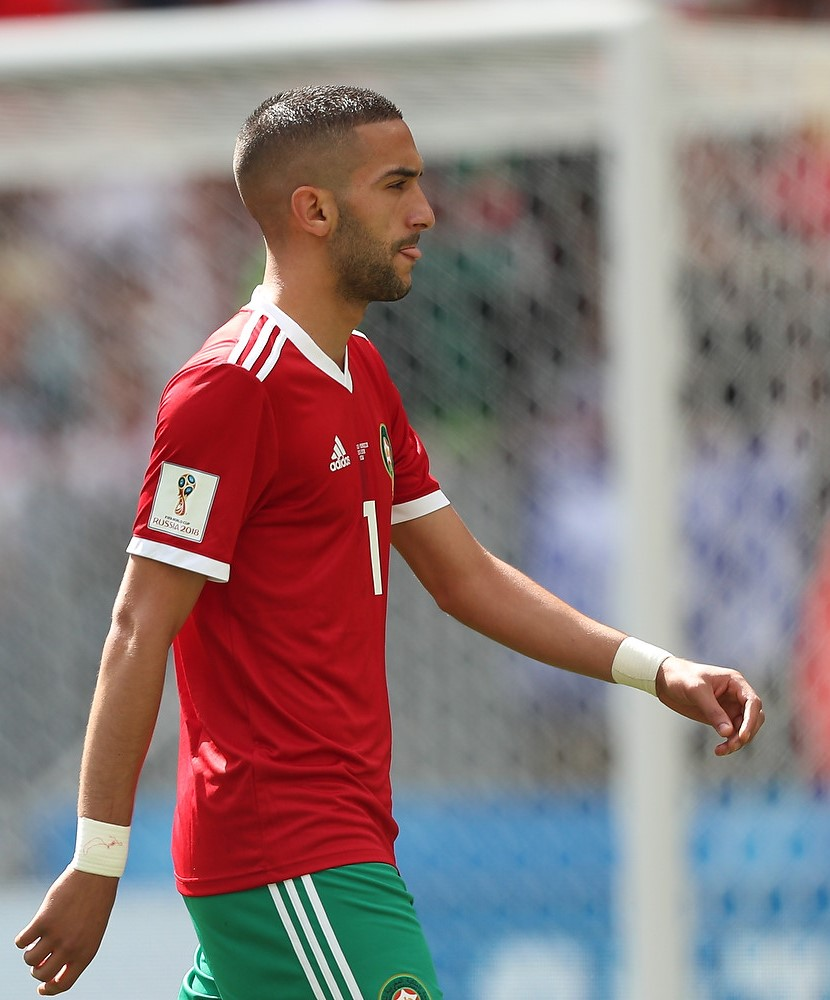
Hakim Ziyech

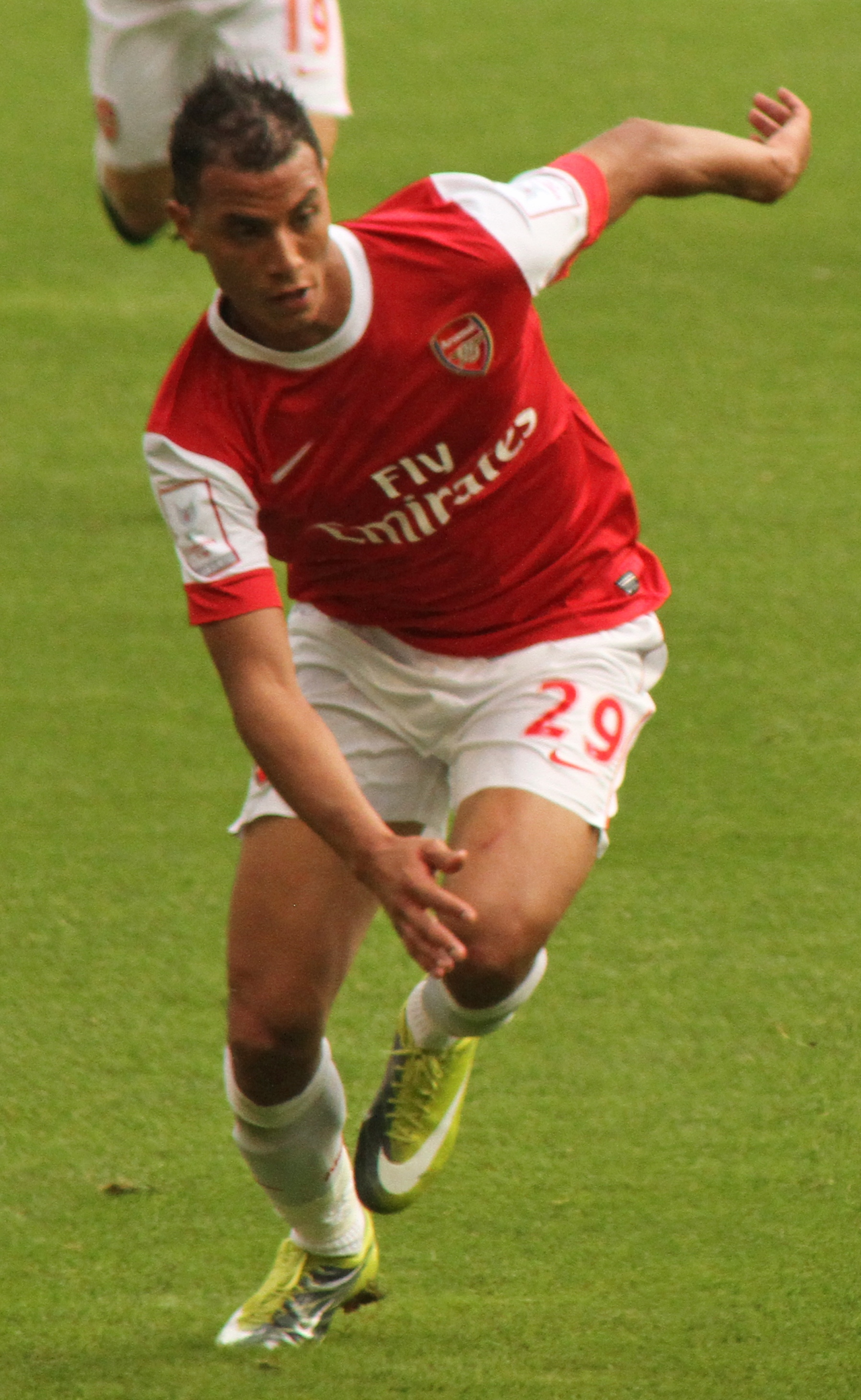
Marouane Chamakh

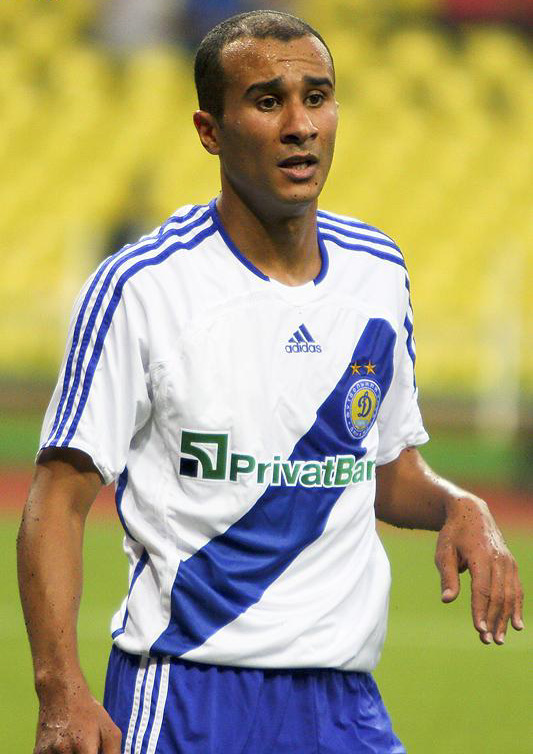
Badr El Kaddouri

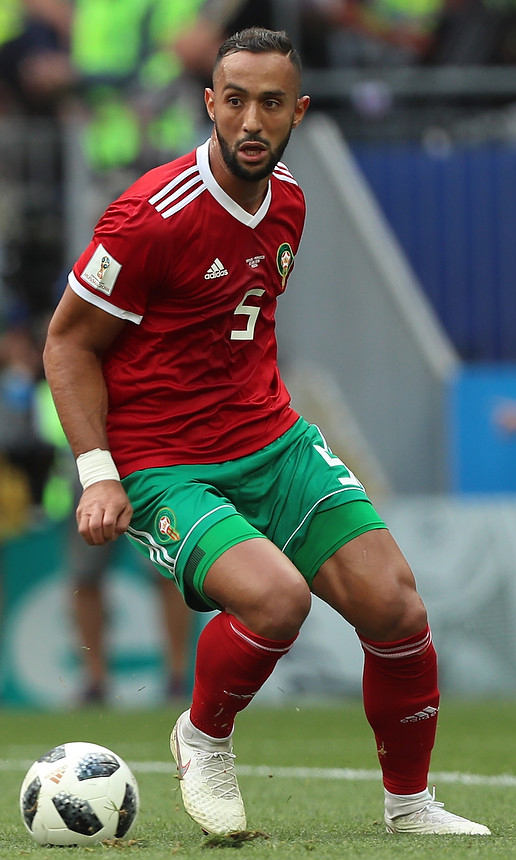
Medhi Benatia

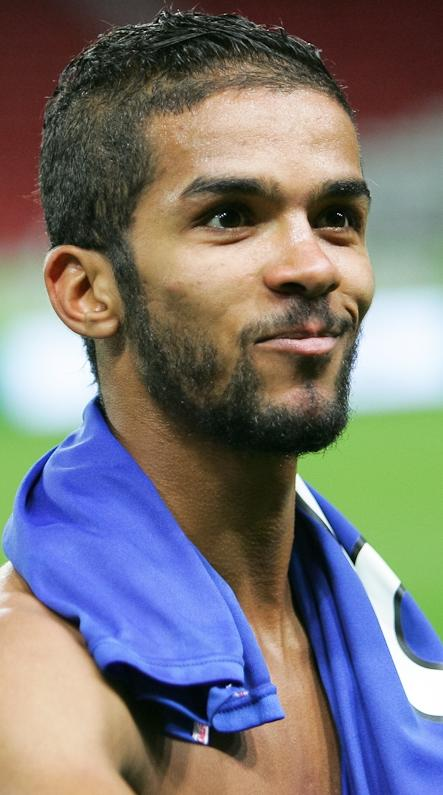
Mehdi Carcela.
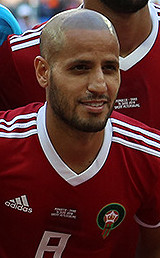
Karim El Ahmadi

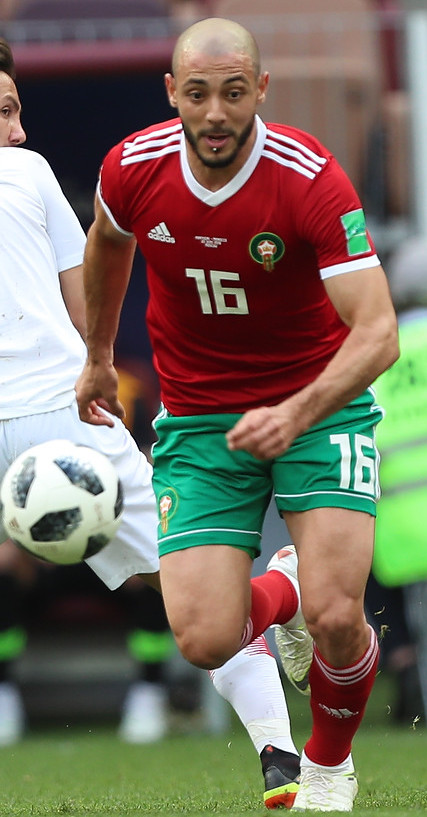
Nordin Amrabat

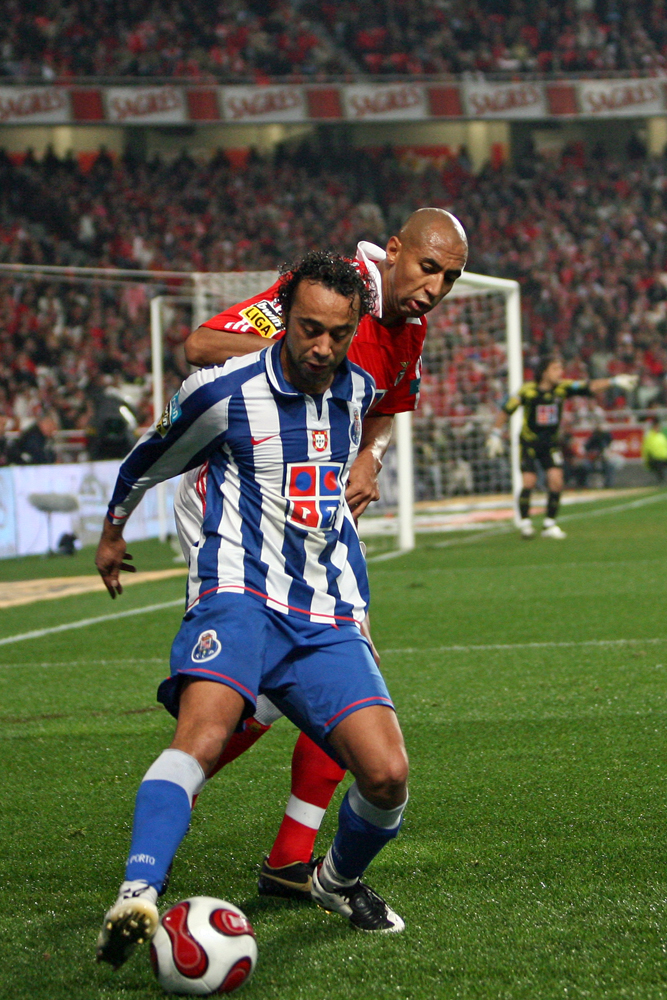
Tarik Sektioui

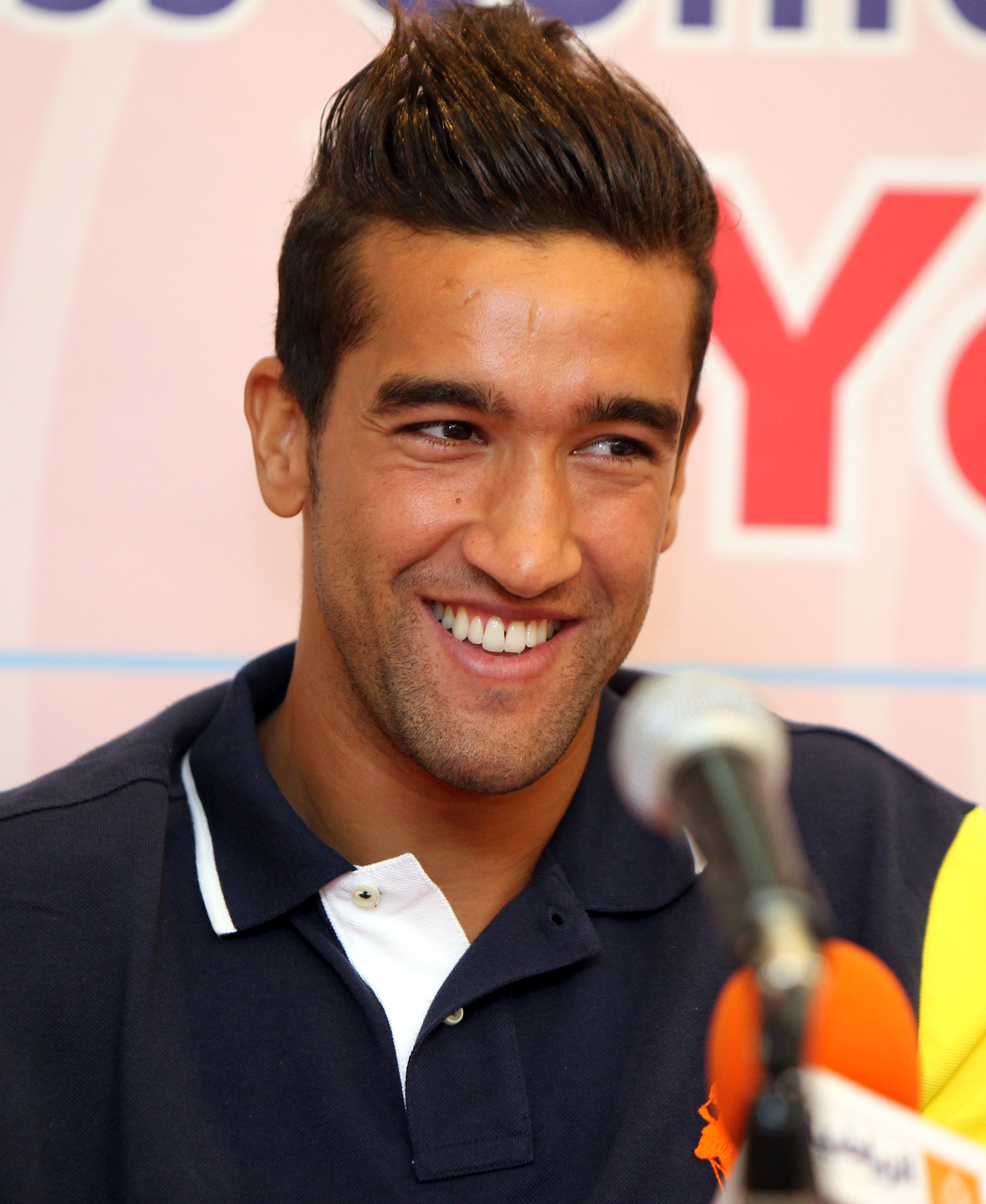
Youssouf Hadji

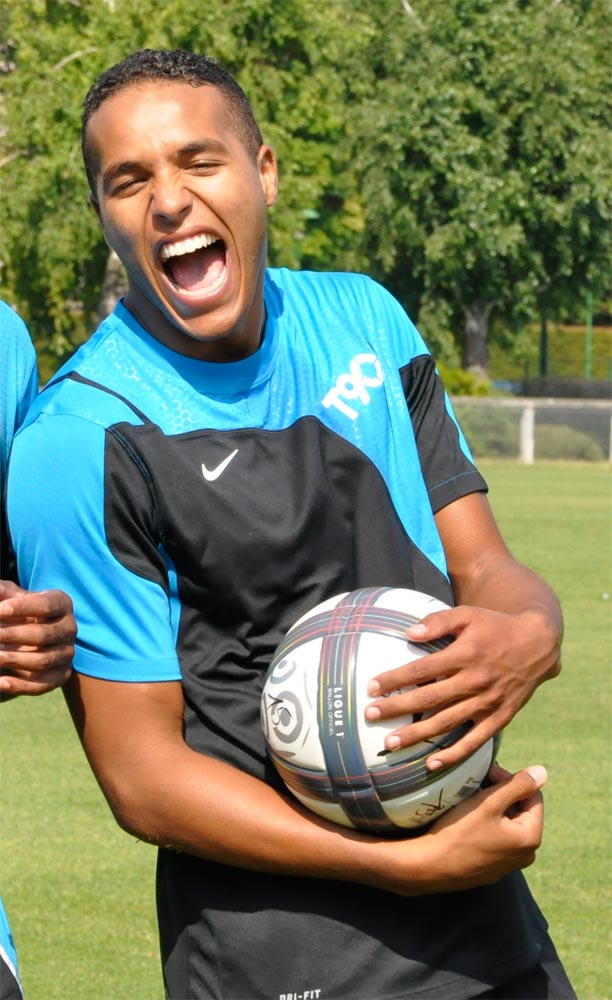
Youssef El-Arabi

=== Moroccan descent players played for other national teams ===
- Khalid Boulahrouz was born in Maassluis, Netherlands to a family of Moroccan descent. He has eight siblings. As a youngster he went to the youth academies of Ajax and Haarlem. When he was sixteen his father died and he had to take responsibility for his family.
- Ibrahim Afellay is of Moroccan Riffian descent; his parents left their hometown Al Hoceima in the 1960s to work in the Netherlands. He grew up in Overvecht, a neighbourhood in Utrecht with a large immigrant population. Afellay and his brother, Ali, were brought up by their mother, Habiba, after his father died when he was young., his family are Moroccan Dutch. After both the Moroccan and the Netherlands national teams managers selected him for their squads, he was caught in the dilemma to either play for the Moroccan national team, because of his Moroccan descent, or to play for the Dutch team, the Netherlands being his place of birth and residence. He ultimately decided to play for the Netherlands national team despite the heavy competition for places in midfield.
- Adil Rami was born in the city of Bastia on the island of Corsica to Moroccan parents. As a youth, his family moved to the mainland, eventually settling in the southern coast city of Fréjus, where his mother worked as a member of the city council. Rami is the third of four children and has two sisters and one brother., Rami is a French international, having made his debut on 11 August 2010 in a friendly match against Norway. Prior to representing France, he drew interest from the Moroccan national team. Ahead of the 2008 Africa Cup of Nations, Rami was offered a chance to play with Morocco at the competition by manager Henri Michel. However, Rami declined the offer, citing his ambition to play for France. He has stated on several occasions that he would prefer to "represent Morocco within the France team".

== European League ==
=== Albania ===
Mohamed Chibi Mohamed Chibi

=== Bulgaria ===
Player	Club(s)	Period
Chakib Benzoukane	Levski Sofia	2007–10
Mehdi Bourabia	Lokomotiv Plovdiv, Cherno More, Levski Sofia	2015, 2015, 2016–17
Yassine El Kharroubi	Lokomotiv Plovdiv	2015–17
Rayan Frikeche	Lokomotiv Plovdiv	2017
Ilias Haddad	CSKA Sofia	2012
Mourad Hdiouad	Litex Lovech, CSKA Sofia	2001–05, 2005–06
Abderrahman Kabous	CSKA Sofia	2007–08
Abdelkarim Kissi	Litex Lovech, Beroe	2004–05, 2007
Youssef Rabeh	Levski Sofia	2007–10
Rachid Tiberkanine	Levski Sofia	2008–09

=== Croatia ===
Player	Club(s)	Period
Oussama Zamouri	Inter Zaprešić	2019–

=== Cyprus ===
Player	Club(s)	Period
Samir Bengelloun	APOP Kinyras Peyias FC	2008–10
Tarik Bengelloun	Enosis Neon Paralimni FC	2011
Chakib Benzoukane	Apollon Limassol	2012
Mohammed Chaouch	APOEL FC	1999–2000
Karim Fegrouche	AEL Limassol	2013–15
Rachid Hamdani	Apollon Limassol	2011–15
Abdelkarim Kissi	Enosis Neon Paralimni, Apollon Limassol, AEK Larnaca, Ermis Aradippou, Ethnikos Achna	2007–08, 2008, 2009, 2009–10, 2010–12
Ryan Mmaee	AEL Limassol	2019–
Khalid Sinouh	AC Omonia	2005–06
Hamid Rhanem	Ayia Napa FC, Enosis Neon Paralimni FC, AEK Larnaca FC, APOP Kinyras Peyias FC	2007, 2007, 2008, 2009
Jaouad Zairi	Anorthosis Famagusta FC	2012

=== Denmark ===
Player	Club(s)	Period
Bouabid Bouden	Odense BK	2005–06
Karim Zaza	FCK, Odense BK, Brøndby IF, AaB	1995–2000, 2000–03, 2003–06, 2007–10

=== England ===
Player	Club(s)	Period
Nordin Amrabat	Watford	2015–18
Oussama Assaidi	Liverpool, Stoke City	2012–15
Sofiane Boufal	Southampton	2016–18, 2019–2020
Marouane Chamakh	Arsenal, West Ham United, Crystal Palace	2010–16
Youssef Chippo	Coventry City	1999–2001
Manuel da Costa	West Ham United	2009–11
Karim El Ahmadi	Aston Villa	2012–14
Talal El Karkouri	Sunderland, Charlton Athletic	2002–03, 2004–07
Tahar El Khalej	Southampton, Charlton Athletic	1999–2003
Nabil El Zhar	Liverpool	2006–07 & 2008–10
Mustapha Hadji	Coventry City, Aston Villa	1999–2004
Hassan Kachloul	Southampton, Aston Villa, Wolverhampton Wanderers	1998–2002, 2003–04
Noureddine Naybet	Tottenham Hotspur	2004–06
Abdeslam Ouaddou	Fulham	2001–03
Youssef Safri	Norwich City	2004–05
Romain Saïss	Wolverhampton Wanderers	2018–2022
Adel Taarabt	Tottenham Hotspur, Queens Park Rangers, Fulham	2006–09, 2011–15

=== Finland ===
Player	Club(s)	Period
Nassim Boujellab	HJK Helsinki	2022

=== France ===
Player	Club(s)	Period
Zakariya Abarouaï	Evian	2014–15
Yunis Abdelhamid	Dijon, Reims	2016–17, 2018–
Mohamed El Ouargla Abdelrrazak	Sète, Stade Français, Nîmes Olympique, Nice, Valenciennes, Lyon, Alès	1945–51, 1952–59
Yacine Abdessadki	Strasbourg, Toulouse FC	2000–01, 2003–06, 2007–08
Hicham Aboucherouane	Lille OSC	2005–06
Karim Achahbar	Guingamp	2014–15
Ben Mohamed Adesselem	Bordeaux, Nîmes Olympique	1952–57
Nayef Aguerd	Dijon	2018–
Abdeljahid Aid	RC Paris	1988–90
Youssef Aït Bennasser	Nancy, Caen, Monaco, Saint-Étienne, Bordeaux	2016–
Hassan Akesbi	Nîmes Olympique, Reims, AS Monaco	1955–64
Jamal Alioui	Metz	2005–06
Rachid Alioui	Guingamp, Nîmes Olympique, Angers	2013–14, 2015–16, 2018–
Hassan Alla	Le Havre	2008–09
Redouan Allaoui	Le Havre	2006–08
Azzedine Amanallah	Niort	1987–88
Gharib Amzine	Strasbourg, Troyes	1998-03, 2005–07
Houssaine Anafal	Rennes	1974–75, 1976–77
Abdallah Azhar	Reims, Grenoble	1958–63
Yacine Bammou	Nantes, Caen	2014–19
Abdelaziz Barrada	Marseille	2014–16
Amine Bassi	Nancy	2016–17
Salaheddine Bassir	Lille OSC	2001–02
Chahir Belghazouani	Ajaccio	2012–14
Younès Belhanda	Montpellier, Nice	2009–13, 2016–17
Sami Ben Amar	Nîmes	2019–
Aziz Ben Askar	Caen	2004–05
Mohamed Ben Brahim	Sète, FC Nancy	1945–52
Omar Ben Driss	Nice, Nîmes Olympique	1954–55, 1959–61
Abdallah Ben Fatah	RC Paris	1945–46
Abdesselem Ben Miloud	Marseille	1947–56
Driss Ben Tamir	Bordeaux	1954–56
Youssef Benali	Toulouse	2014–16
Aziz Bennij	AS Nancy	1991–92
Yassine Benrahou	Bordeaux, Nîmes Olympique	2018–
Zakarya Bergdich	Lens	2010–11
Nabil Berkak	Troyes	2002–03, 2005–07
Mustapha Bettache	Nîmes Olympique	1956–63
Mohammed Bouassa	Lyon	1967–69
Ben Mohamed Bouchaïb	Marseille, CO Roubaix-Tourcoing, Montpellier	1946–50, 1952–53
Sofiane Boufal	Lille	2014–16
Mehdi Bourabia	Grenoble	2009–10
Mohamed Chaoui Bouchaïb	Montpellier	1946–47
Aziz Bouderbala	RC Paris, Lyon	1988–92
Nourdin Boukhari	Nantes	2006–07
Mehdi Bourabia	Grenoble	2009–10
Khalid Boutaïb	Gazélec Ajaccio	2015–16
Zahar Brahim	RC Paris, Bordeaux	1956–58, 1961–63
Fouad Chafik	Dijon	2016–
Kamel Chafni	Ajaccio, Auxerre	2005–06, 2007–12
Marouane Chamakh	Bordeaux	2002–10
Mohammed Chaouch	Saint-Étienne, Metz, Nice	1988–90, 1992–93, 1994–97
Saïd Chiba	AS Nancy	1999-00
Chicha	Marseille	1955–57, 1958–59
Mickaël Chrétien Basser	AS Nancy	2005–11, 2016–17
Manuel da Costa	AS Nancy	2005–06
Mounir Diane	Lens	2003–08
Nabil Dirar	Monaco	2012–17
Mehdi Djillali	Toulon	1959–60
Boussa El Aouad	Lens	1983–85
Youssef El Arabi	Caen	2010–11
Brahim El Bahri	Le Mans	2007–09
Hakim El Bounadi	Sochaux	2006–09
Mustapha El Haddaoui	Saint-Étienne, Nice, Lens, Angers	1987–90, 1991–94
Oualid El Hajjam	Amiens	2017–19
Alharbi El Jadeyaoui	Lens	2014–15
Abdelhamid El Kaoutari	Montpellier, Reims, Bastia	2009–17
Talal El Karkouri	Paris SG	1999–02, 2003–04
Bouchaib El Moubarki	Grenoble	2008–09
Aziz El Ouali	Nîmes Olympique	1991–93
Amin Erbati	Marseille, Arles-Avignon	2008–09, 2010–11
Abdelilah Fahmi	Lille OSC, Strasbourg	2000–05
Fayçal Fajr	Caen	2011–12, 2018–19
Driss Fettouhi	Le Havre	2008–09
Youssouf Hadji	Bastia, Rennes, AS Nancy	2003–12
Abdelkader Hamiri	Red Star, Stade Français, Cannes	1945–47, 1948–49
Hassan Hanini	Bordeaux, Lens	1983–87
Amine Harit	Nantes	2016–17
Hassan Harmatallah	Lens	1977–78
Larbi Hazam	Valenciennes	1975–79
Adil Hermach	Lens, Bastia	2009–11, 2012–13
Yassine Jebbour	Rennes, Nancy, Montpellier, Bastia	2010–16
Abdelkrim Jinani	Rennes	1997–98
Nourredine Kacemi	Istres	2004–05
Hassan Kachloul	Nîmes Olympique, Metz	1992–93, 1996–98
Ahmed Kantari	Brest, Lens	2010–13, 2014–15
Mohamed Khalfi	Alès	1947–48
Driss Khalid	Toulouse	2017–18
Abdelkrim Krimau	Bastia, Lille, Strasbourg, Tours, Le Havre, Saint-Étienne, RC Paris	1974–81, 1982–89
Mohammed Lashaf	Gueugnon	1995–96
Ben Kadour M'Barek	Bordeaux	1946–47, 1949–52
Abderrahmane Mahjoub	RC Paris, Nice, Montpellier	1951–60, 1961–64
Mohammed Mahjoub	Marseille	1948–50
Mohammed Mahroufi	Nîmes Olympique	1971–72
Kevin Malcuit	Monaco, Saint-Étienne, Lille	2010–11, 2015–18
Belhadj Djilali Mehdi	Nîmes Olympique, Toulon	1955–60
Hamza Mendyl	Lille, Dijon	2016–18, 2019–
Mehdi Messaoudi	Saint-Étienne	2008–09
Hassan M'Jid	Sète, Nice	1949–51, 1952–53
Lahcer Mounadi	Sochaux	1990–91
Noureddine Naybet	Nantes	1993–94
Mounir Obbadi	Troyes, Monaco, Lille, Nice	2012–14, 2015–17
Abdeslam Ouaddou	Nancy, Rennes, Valenciennes	1998–00, 2003–05, 2006–10
Walid Regragui	Toulouse FC, Ajaccio, Grenoble	2000–01, 2002–04, 2008–09
Youssef Rossi	Rennes	1997–99
Mohammed Saghir	Troyes	1954–56
Romain Saïss	Angers	2015–16
Khalid Sekkat	Reims	2012–13
Tarik Sektioui	Auxerre	1998–99
Kacem Slimani	Paris FC	1972–73
Oussama Souaidy	Toulouse FC	2000–01
Oussama Tannane	Saint-Étienne	2015–18
Farid Talhaoui	Guingamp, Lorient	2001–04, 2006–07
Ahmed Tibari	RC Paris, Toulouse FC (1937)	1957–60, 1961–62
Smahi Triki	Lorient	1998–99
Brahim Zahar	Bordeaux	1962–63
Jaouad Zairi	Sochaux, Nantes	2001–05, 2006–07
Moncef Zerka	AS Nancy	2005–09

=== Germany ===
Player	Club(s)	Period
Yacine Abdessadki	SC Freiburg	2009–12
Abdelaziz Ahanfouf	Hansa Rostock, SpVgg Unterhaching, MSV Duisburg, Arminia Bielefeld	1999–2001, 2005–07
Mohamed Amsif	FC Augsburg	2011–14
Rachid Azzouzi	MSV Duisburg	1991–92, 1993–95
Younès Belhanda	Schalke 04	2015–16
Mehdi Benatia	Bayern Munich	2014–16
Nassim Boujellab	Schalke 04	2018–
Mourad Bounoua	Eintracht Frankfurt	1998–99
Ouasim Bouy	Hamburger SV	2013–14
Adil Chihi	1. FC Köln	2008–12
Nasir El Kasmi	MSV Duisburg	2005–06
Achraf Hakimi	Borussia Dortmund	2018–
Amine Harit	Schalke 04	2017–
Hamza Mendyl	Schalke 04	2018–
Youssef Mokhtari	1. FC Köln, MSV Duisburg	2005–06, 2007–08
Anas Ouahim	1. FC Köln	2017–18
Abderrahim Ouakili	1860 Munich	1997–99
Hamid Termina	Energie Cottbus	2001–02

=== Greece ===
Player	Club(s)	Period
Nordin Amrabat	AEK Athens	2021–2025
Salaheddine Bassir	Aris	2002–2003
Nabil Baha	AEK Athens	2010–2011
Chahir Belghazouani	Levadiakos	2015–18
Ouasim Bouy	Panathinaikos	2014–2015
Mehdi Carcela	Olympiacos	2017
Youssef El-Arabi	Olympiacos	2019–2024
Saïd Chiba	Aris	2001–2003
Manuel da Costa	Olympiacos	2015–2017
Ayoub El Kaabi	Olympiacos	2023–
Omar El Kaddouri	PAOK	2017–2023
Talal El Karkouri	Aris	2000–2001
Nabil El Zhar	PAOK	2010–2011
Karim Fegrouche	PAS Giannina	2011–2013
Rachid Hamdani	Asteras Tripolis	2015–17
Hachim Mastour	Lamia	2018–19
Abdeslam Ouaddou	Olympiacos	2005–2006
Abderrahim Ouakili	Xanthi	2001–2003
Azzedine Ounahi	Panathinaikos	2024–2025
Jaouad Zairi	Asteras Tripolis, Olympiacos, PAS Giannina	2007–2012

=== Hungary ===
Player	Club(s)	Period
Youssef Sekour	Diósgyőri VTK	2012

=== Italy ===
Player	Club(s)	Period
Jamal Alioui	Perugia	2003–04
Sofyan Amrabat	Verona	2019–
Mehdi Benatia	Udinese, Roma, Juventus	2010–14, 2016–19
Zakarya Bergdich	Genoa	2014–15
Soufiane Bidaoui	Parma	2014–15
Mehdi Bourabia	Sassuolo	2018–
Ouasim Bouy	Palermo	2016–17
Manuel da Costa	Fiorentina, Sampdoria	2008–09
Mounir El Hamdaoui	Fiorentina	2012–13, 2014–15
Moestafa El Kabir	Cagliari	2011–12
Omar El Kaddouri	Napoli, Torino, Empoli	2012–17
Abdelhamid El Kaoutari	Palermo	2015–16
Jawad El Yamiq	Genoa	2017–18 & 2019–20
Zouhair Feddal	Palermo, Parma	2014–15
Abderrazak Jadid	Brescia, Parma	2002–03, 2004–05, 2011–12
Houssine Kharja	Roma, Siena, Genoa, Internazionale, Fiorentina	2005–06, 2007–12
Sofian Kiyine	Chievo	2016–17, 2018–19
Achraf Lazaar	Palermo, Benevento	2014–16, 2017–18
Kévin Malcuit	Napoli	2018–
Ibrahim Maaroufi	Internazionale	2006–07
Rachid Neqrouz	Bari	1997–2001
Mounir Obbadi	Verona	2014–15
Abdelilah Saber	Napoli	2000–01
Adel Taarabt	Milan, Genoa	2013–14, 2016–18

=== Kosovo ===
Player	Club(s)	Period
El Mehdi Daba	KEK-u Kastriot	2006–08

=== Netherlands ===
Player	Club(s)	Period
Yassine Abdellaoui	Willem II, NAC, NEC	1992–03
Rochdi Achenteh	PEC Zwolle, Vitesse, Willem II, Go Ahead Eagles	2012–17
Alami Ahannach	MVV Maastricht	1997–99
Karim El Ahmadi	Twente, Feyenoord	2003–12, 2014–18
Ismaïl Aissati	PSV, Twente, Ajax, Vitesse	2005–12
Youssef El Akchaoui	ADO Den Haag, NEC, Heerenveen, VVV, NAC	2003–13
Taoufik Ameziane	Willem II	1995–96
Lofti Amhaouch	Sparta Rotterdam	1995–96
Ahmed Ammi	NAC Breda, ADO Den Haag, VVV-Venlo	2007–13
Nordin Amrabat	VVV, PSV	2007–11
Sofyan Amrabat	FC Utrecht, Feyenoord	2014–
Oussama Assaidi	De Graafschap, SC Heerenveen, Twente	2008–13, 2016–18
Yassin Ayoub	FC Utrecht, Feyenoord	2012–
Iliass Bel Hassani	Heracles, AZ	2013–
Houssin Bezzai	Sparta Rotterdam	1999-02
Nourdin Boukhari	Sparta Rotterdam, Ajax, NAC, AZ, RKC Waalwijk	2000–08, 2011–13
Ali Boussaboun	Groningen, NAC, Feyenoord, Utrecht, ADO Den Haag	2001–07, 2008–09, 2010–12
Ouasim Bouy	PEC Zwolle	2015–17, 2018–
Faouzi El Brazi	FC Twente	2001–03
Manuel da Costa	PSV Eindhoven	2006–08
Anouar Diba	NAC Breda, FC Twente	2000–07, 2009–10
Aziz Doufikar	PEC Zwolle, Fortuna Sittard	1984–87, 1990–92
Ali Elkhattabi	Sparta Rotterdam, Heerenveen, AZ, RBC Roosendaal	1995–06
Karim Fachtali	NEC, RKC Waalwijk	2006–08, 2011–12
Adam Farouk	RBC Roosendaal	2004–05
Youssef Fertout	AZ	1998–01
Zakaria El Azzouzi	FC Twente, Sparta Rotterdam, Ajax	2015–
Abdelkrim El Hadrioui	AZ	1998–2002
Mounir El Hamdaoui	Excelsior, Willem II, AZ, Ajax, AZ Alkmaar	2002–03, 2006–11, 2015–16
Redouan El Hankouri	Excelsior	2018–
Soufian El Hassnaoui	De Graafschap	2013–14
Faysal El Idrissi	FC Groningen	2000–02
Youssef El Kachati	Sparta Rotterdam	2019–
Ahmed El Messaoudi	Fortuna Sittard, Groningen	2018–
Oussama Idrissi	Groningen, AZ	2015–
Anouar Kali	Utrecht, Roda JC, Willem II, Utrecht	2010–
Abdelkarim Kissi	Heerenveen	2005–06
Zakaria Labyad	PSV, Vitesse, Utrecht, Ajax	2009–15, 2016–
Mimoun Mahi	FC Groningen	2014–
Youssef Mariana	Willem II	2000–04
Hachim Mastour	PEC Zwolle	2016–17
Noussair Mazraoui	Ajax	2017–
Ali Messaoud	AZ, Willem II, NEC, Excelsior	2012–13, 2014–15, 2016–
Mourad Mghizrat	Sparta, Utrecht, Den Bosch, Willem II	1996–2007
Youness Mokhtar	PEC Zwolle, Twente	2012–15, 2016–18
Imad Najah	RKC Waalwijk	2012–14
Houssein Ouhsaine Ouichou	FC Volendam	2003–04
Bilal Ould-Chikh	ADO Den Haag	2019–
Adil Ramzi	Willem II, PSV, Twente, AZ, Utrecht, Roda JC	1997–2007, 2011–13
Youssef Rossi	NEC	1999–2000
Akram Roumani	RBC Roosendaal	2005–06
Tarik Sektioui	Willem II, AZ	2000–06
Khalid Sinouh	Heerenveen, RKC Waalwijk, AZ, Utrecht, PSV, NEC	1997–98, 2000–05, 2006–07, 2009–13
Anas Tahiri	RKC Waalwijk	2019–
Oussama Tannane	Heerenveen, Heracles	2012–16
Adnane Tighadouini	Vitesse, NAC, Twente	2010–12, 2013–15, 2016–18
Tarik Tissoudali	VVV-Venlo	2017–18
Chakib Zbayri	RKC Waalwijk	2003–04
Hakim Ziyech	Heerenveen, Twente, Ajax	2012–

=== Portugal ===
Player	Club(s)	Period

=== Romania ===
Player	Club(s)	Period

=== Russia ===
Player	Club(s)	Period

=== Scotland ===
Player	Club(s)	Period

=== Spain ===
Player	Club(s)	Period

=== Switzerland ===
Player	Club(s)	Period

=== Turkey ===
Player	Club(s)	Period
Mohamed Abarhoun	Çaykur Rizespor	2018–
Nordin Amrabat	Kayserispor, Galatasaray	2011–14
Ismaïl Aissati	Antalyaspor, Alanyaspor	2012–13, 2016–17
Jamal Alioui	Karabükspor	2010
Yacine Bammou	Alanyaspor	2019–
Abdelaziz Barrada	Antalyaspor	2018–19
Younès Belhanda	Galatasaray	2017–
Zakarya Bergdich	Denizlispor	2019–
Nourdin Boukhari	Kasımpaşa	2009–10
Mehdi Bourabia	Konyaspor	2017–18
Khalid Boutaïb	Yeni Malatyaspor	2017–19
Aatif Chahechouhe	Sivasspor, Fenerbahçe, Çaykur Rizespor, Antalyaspor	2012–
Issam Chebake	Yeni Malatyaspor	2017–
Michaël Chrétien Basser	Bursaspor	2011–14
Manuel da Costa	Sivasspor, İstanbul Başakşehir F.K., Trabzonspor	2013–15, 2017–
Nabil Dirar	Fenerbahçe	2017–
Moestafa El Kabir	Gençlerbirliği, Çaykur Rizespor	2015–19
Reda Ereyahi	Göztepe	2000
Youssouf Hadji	Elazığspor	2013
Youness Mokhtar	MKE Ankaragücü	2018–19
Adrien Regattin	Osmanlıspor	2016–18
Marwane Saâdane	Çaykur Rizespor	2016–19
Rial Sellam	Bursaspor	1966–67
Jamal Sellami	Beşiktaş	1997–98
Khalid Sinouh	Kasımpaşa	2007–08
Mehdi Taouil	Sivasspor	2013–16
Adnane Tighadouini	Kayserispor	2016

== List All-time top appearances of Moroccan players in European League ==
List of Moroccan players with 200 or more appearances in European League top leval
R.	Player	European Club(s)	Apps
1	Karim El Ahmadi	Twente (89) – Feyenoord (227) – Aston Villa (51)	376
2	Abdelkrim Merry	Bastia (93) – Lille (35) – Metz (36) – Strasbourg (24) – Tours (35) – Le Havre (34) – Saint-Etienne (30) – Matra Racing (50)	337
3	Marouane Chamakh	Bordeaux (230) – Arsenal (40) – West Ham United (3) – Crystal Palace (60)	333
4	**Younès Belhanda**	Montpellier (127) – Nice (31) – Dynamo Kyiv (56) – Schalke 04 (15) – Galatasaray (99) – **Adana Demirspor** (0)	329
5	Noureddine Naybet	Nantes (34) – Sporting CP (54) – Deportivo La Coruña (211) – Tottenham Hotspur (30)	329
6	**Nabil Dirar**	Westerlo (57) – Club Brugge (116) – Monaco (76) – **Fenerbahçe** (73) – **Kasımpaşa** (0)	322
7	Mbark Boussoufa	Gent (68) – Anderlecht (148) – Anzhi Makhachkala (68) – Lokomotiv Moscow (39)	322
8	Karim Zaza	FC København (78) – Odense BK (79) – Brøndby IF (49) – Aalborg BK (114)	320
9	**Mehdi Carcela**	**Standard Liège** (233) – Anzhi Makhachkala (31) – Benfica (20) – Granada (22) – Olympiacos (6)	310
10	Nordin Amrabat	VVV-Venlo (33) – PSV (56) – Kayserispor (39) – Galatasaray (34) – Málaga (59) – **Leganés** (30) – Watford (47)	298
11	Hassan Akesbi	Nîmes Olympique (204) – Reims (78) – Monaco (11)	293
12	Nourdin Boukhari	Sparta (108) – Ajax (69) – Breda (55) – AZ (10) – Waalwijk (26) – Nantes (9) – Kasımpaşa (4) – Wisła Kraków (9)	290
13	Youssouf Hadji	Nancy (161) – Bastia (61) – Rennes (57) –Elazığspor (6)	285
14	Hassan Nader	Mallorca (45) – Farense (201) – Benfica (17)	263
15	Adil Ramzi	Willem II (52) – PSV (49) – Twente (32) – AZ (32) – Utrecht (15) – Roda JC Kerkrade (76)	256
16	**Youssef El-Arabi**	Caen (41) – Granada (130) – **Olympiacos** (69)	240
17	Mehdi Taouil	Kilmarnock (107) – Heart of Midlothian (55) – Sivasspor (73) – AZAL (5)	240
18	**Hakim Ziyech**	Heerenveen (36) – Twente (68) – Ajax (112) – **Chelsea** (23)	239
19	Ali Elkhattabi	Sparta (84) – Heerenveen (41) – AZ (94) – RBC Roosendaal (19)	238
20	Aziz Bouderbala	Sion (88) – St. Gallen (21) – Racing Club Paris (49) – Lyon (54) – Estoril (24)	236
21	Larbi Benbarek	Marseille (62) – Stade Français (60) – Atlético Madrid (113)	235
22	Ismaïl Aissati	PSV (44) – Twente (14) – Ajax (36) – Vitesse (29) – Antalyaspor (26) – Alanyaspor (12) – Terek Grozny (64)	225
23	Mustafa El Haddaoui	Lausanne Sports (23) – AS Saint-Étienne (33) – OGC Nice (58) – RC Lens (60) – Angers SCO (34)	208
(Italics denotes players still playing in European League; **Bold** denotes players still playing in the European League)

Correct as of 30 June 2021 (UTC)

== Moroccan players and European Competitions ==
Bold Still playing competitive football in Europe

List of Moroccan players with 20 or more appearances in European competitions
#	Name	Games					Date of debut	Debut against	Date of last match	Final match against
#	Name	C1	C2	C3	SC	TOTAL	Date of debut	Debut against	Date of last match	Final match against
1	Nabil Dirar	25	–	37	–	62	18 Sep 2008	(Switzerland) Young Boys	7 Aug 2018	(Portugal) Benfica
2	Mehdi Carcela	21	–	37	–	58	18 Dec 2008	(Germany) VfB Stuttgart	12 Dec 2019	(England) Arsenal
3	Younès Belhanda	25	–	29	–	54	29 Jul 2010	(Hungary) Győri ETO	11 Dec 2019	(France) Paris Saint-Germain
4	Mbark Boussoufa	17	–	35	–	52	13 Sep 2006	(France) Lille OSC	14 Mar 2013	(England) Newcastle United
5	Hakim Ziyech	29	–	20	–	49	2 Aug 2012	(Romania) Rapid București	20 Feb 2020	(Spain) Getafe CF
6	Marouane Chamakh	30	–	19	–	49	25 Sep 2003	(Slovakia) Petržalka	4 Dec 2012	(Greece) Olympiacos
7	Badr El Kaddouri	32	–	14	–	46	12 Dec 2002	(Turkey) Beşiktaş	26 July 2011	(Russia) Rubin Kazan
8	Medhi Benatia	31	–	13	–	44	15 Sep 2011	(France) Stade Rennais	2 Oct 2018	(Switzerland) Young Boys
9	Manuel da Costa	12	–	24	–	36	31 Oct 2006	(Turkey) Galatasaray	16 Aug 2018	(England) Burnley
10	Tarik Sektioui	11	–	18	–	29	16 Sep 2004	(Greece) PAOK	7 Apr 2009	(England) Manchester United
11	Karim El Ahmadi	4	–	18	–	22	20 Sep 2007	(Spain) Getafe CF	1 Nov 2017	(Ukraine) Shakhtar Donetsk

Correct as of 11 March 2020 (UTC)

== List All-time top goalscorers for the Moroccan players in European Leagues ==
List of Moroccan players with 50 or more goals
R.	Player	European Leagues Club(s)	Goals
1	Samir Hadji	CS Fola Esch (109) – F91 Dudelange (72) – FC Differdange 03 (8)	189
1	Hassan Akesbi	Nîmes Olympique (119) – Reims (48) – Monaco (6)	173
3	**Youssef El-Arabi**	Caen (17) – Nantes (3) – Granada (43) – **Olympiacos** (68) – APOEL (13)	144
4	Larbi Benbarek	Marseille (17) – Stade Français (43) – Atlético Madrid (56)	116
5	Omar Er Rafik	FC Differdange 03 (104) – F91 Dudelange (7) – Jeunesse Esch (4)	115
6	Abdelkrim Merry	Bastia (22) – Lille (12) – Metz (23) – Strasbourg (3) – Tours (6) – Le Havre (17) – Saint-Etienne (9) – Matra Racing (10)	102
7	Hassan Nader	Mallorca (7) – Farense (87) – Benfica (7)	101
8	Youssef En-Nesyri	Málaga CF (5) – CD Leganés (13) – Sevilla FC (51) – Fenerbahçe (27)	96
9	Hakim Ziyech	SC Heerenveen (11) – FC Twente Enschede (30) – Ajax Amsterdam (38) – Galatasaray (6) – Chelsea FC (6)	91
10	Ali Elkhattabi	Sparta (37) – Heerenveen (12) – AZ (31) – RBC Roosendaal (1)	81
11	Mounir El Hamdaoui	SBV Excelsior (6) – AZ Alkmaar (51) – Ajax Amsterdam (13) – Willem II Tilburg (3) – ACF Fiorentina (4) – Málaga CF (3)	80
12	Mohamed Abderrazak	Sète (37) – Stade Français (1) – Montpellier (6) – Real Murcie (2) – Nîmes (8) – Nice (20) – Valenciennes (1) – Lyon (4)	79
13	Ayoub El Kaabi	Olympiakós Le Pirée (52) – Hatayspor (26)	78
14	Mbark Boussoufa	Gent (16) – Anderlecht (48) – Anzhi Makhachkala (11) – Lokomotiv Moscow (3)	78
15	Aatif Chahechouhe	Sivasspor (48) – Fenerbahce (10) – Büyüksehir Belediye Erzurumspor (4) – Fatih Karagümrük (0) – Antalyaspor (1) – Caykur Rizespor (3) – Chernomorets (10) – Nancy (0)	76
16	Younès Belhanda	Adana Demirspor (18) – Galatasaray (18) – OGC Nice (3) – FC Schalke 04 (2) – Dynamo Kyiv (8) – Montpellier (26)	75
17	Marouane Chamakh	Bordeaux (56) – Arsenal (8) – Crystal Palace (7)	71
18	Ryan Mmaee	Omonia Nicosie (20) – Ferencvárosi TC (25) – AEL Limassol (19) – Aarhus GF (0) – KVRS Waasland - SK Beveren (1) – Standard de Liège (0)	65
19	Youssouf Hadji	Nancy (39) – Bastia (13) – Rennes (9)	61
21	Moestafa El Kabir	Kalmar FF (0) – BK Häcken (21) – Mjällby AIF (16) – Cagliari Calcio (1) – NEC Nijmegen (0) – MKE Ankaragücü (6) – Antalyaspor (4) – Genclerbirligi Ankara (12)	60
22	Abderrahman Mahjoub	Racing Club Paris (32) – Nice (3) – Montpellier (22)	57
23	Nordin Amrabat	VVV-Venlo (10) – PSV Eindhoven (9) – Kayserispor (6) – Galatasaray (1) – Málaga CF (8) – CD Leganés (2) – AEK Athens (21)	57
24	Aziz Bouderbala	Sion (25) – St. Gallen (1) – Racing Club Paris (15) – Lyon (10) – Estoril (4)	55
25	Tarik Tissoudali	KAA La Gantoise (43) – Beerschot VA (9) – VVV-Venlo (1) – PAOK Thessaloniki (2)	55
26	Adil Ramzi	Willem II (19) – PSV Eindhoven (6) – FC Twente (8) – AZ Alkmaar (2) – FC Utrecht (7) – Roda JC Kerkrade (12)	54
27	Nourdin Boukhari	Sparta (21) – Ajax (14) – Breda (12) – Waalwijk (1) – Nantes (2) – Wisła Kraków (1)	51
(Italics denotes players still playing professional football; **Bold** denotes players still playing in the European League)

As of 20 février 2026

== List of All-time Top Goalscorers for Moroccan Players in the Top 5 European Leagues ==
List of Moroccan players with 50 or more goals in Top 5 European Leagues
Rank	Player	Nationality	European Leagues Club(s)	Goals
1	Hassan Akesbi	(Morocco)	(France) Nîmes (119) – (France) Reims (48) – Monaco (6)	173
2	Larbi Benbarek	(Morocco)	(France) Marseille (17) – (France) Stade Français (43) – (Spain) Atlético Madrid (56)	116
3	Abdelkrim Merry	(Morocco)	(France) Bastia (22) – (France) Lille (12) – (France) Metz (23) – (France) Strasbourg (3) – (France) Tours (6) – (France) Le Havre (17) – (France) Saint-Etienne (9) – (France) Matra Racing (10)	102
4	Mohamed Abderrazak	(Morocco)	(France) Sète (37) – (France) Stade Français (1) – (France) Montpellier (6) – (Spain) Real Murcie (2) – (France) Nîmes (8) – (France) Nice (20) – (France) Valenciennes (1) – (France) Lyon (4)	79
5	Marouane Chamakh	(Morocco)	(France) Bordeaux (56) – (England) Arsenal (8) – (England) Crystal Palace (7)	71
6	Youssef En-Nesyri	(Morocco)	(Spain) Málaga (5) – (Spain) Leganés (13) – (Spain) Sevilla (51)	69
7	Youssef El-Arabi	(Morocco)	(France) Caen (17) – (France) Nantes (3) – (Spain) Granada (43)	63
8	Abdesselem Ben Mohammed	(Morocco)	(France) Nîmes (12) – (France) Bordeaux (51)	63
9	Youssouf Hadji	(Morocco)	(France) Nancy (39) – (France) Bastia (13) – (France) Rennes (9)	61
10	Abderrahman Mahjoub	(Morocco)	(France) Racing Club Paris (32) – (France) Nice (3) – (France) Montpellier (22)	57

== List All-time top goalscorers for the Moroccan players in European Competitions ==
Bold Still playing competitive football in Europe

List of Moroccan players with 5 or more goals in European competitions
#	Name	Goals					Date of debut	Debut against	Date of last goal	Final goal against
#	Name	C1	C2	C3	SC	TOTAL	Date of debut	Debut against	Date of last goal	Final goal against
1	Marouane Chamakh	8	–	9	–	17	26 Feb 2004	(Poland) Grodzisk Wielkopolski	19 Oct 2010	(Ukraine) Shakhtar Donetsk
2	Omar Er Rafik	–	–	15	–	15	5 Jul 2012	(Faroe Islands) NSÍ Runavík	30 Jun 2016	(Northern Ireland) Cliftonville
3	Hakim Ziyech	10	–	2	1	13	20 Oct 2016	(Spain) Celta de Vigo	11 Aug 2021	(Spain) Villarreal
4	Youssef El-Arabi	6	–	5	–	11	27 Aug 2019	(Russia) Krasnodar	18 Mar 2021	(England) Arsenal
5	Mbark Boussoufa	1	–	5	–	6	28 Jul 2009	(Turkey) Sivasspor	14 Feb 2013	(Germany) Hannover 96
6	Nabil Dirar	–	–	5	–	5	28 Jul 2011	(Azerbaijan) Qarabağ	3 Aug 2017	(Austria) Sturm Graz

Correct as of 11 August 2021 (UTC)

== List of Moroccan players hat-tricks in European League ==
Position key: GK – Goalkeeper; DF – Defender; MF – Midfielder; FW – Forward; ^{4} – Player scored four goals; ^{6} – Player scored six goals; * – The home team

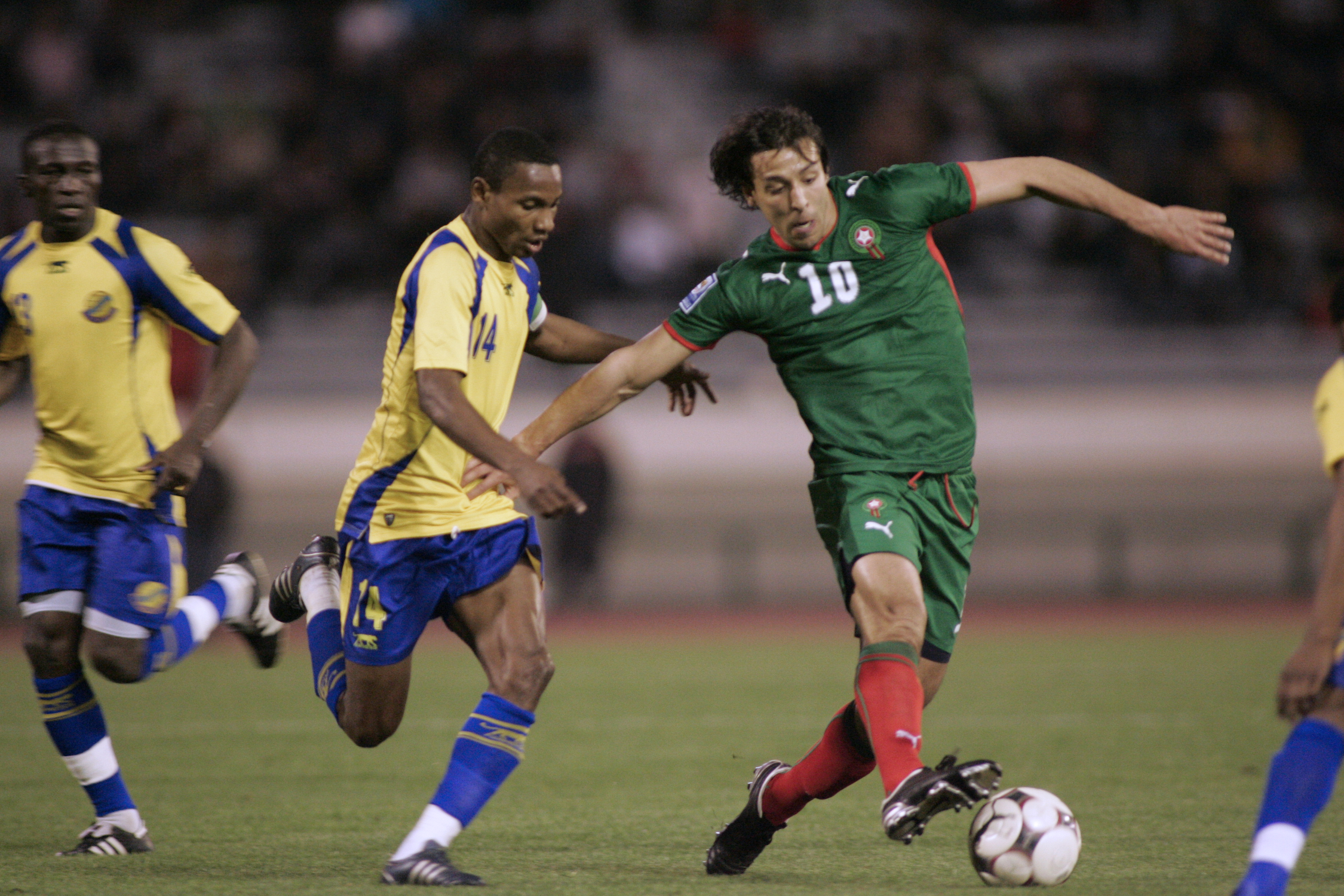
Mounir El Hamdaoui scored three hat-trick in Eredivisie and the first Moroccan to score a hat-trick in La Liga.

Player	Position	For	Against	Result	Date	League	Ref
Abdelkader Hamiri	FW	AS Cannes*	SR Colmar	4–2	17 April 1949	Ligue 1	
Mohamed Mahjoub	FW	Olympique de Marseille*	SO Montpellier	6–3	29 May 1949	Ligue 1	
Mohammed Abderrazack	FW	OGC Nice*	FC Sochaux	4–0	27 February 1955	Ligue 1	
Hassan Akesbi^{4}	FW	Nîmes Olympique*	AS Troyes	5–2	13 November 1955	Ligue 1	
Hassan Akesbi	FW	Nîmes Olympique*	Angers SCO	3–1	12 May 1957	Ligue 1	
Hassan Akesbi	FW	Nîmes Olympique	RC Strasbourg*	5–1	19 October 1958	Ligue 1	
Hassan Akesbi	FW	Nîmes Olympique	Toulouse FC*	4–2	15 February 1959	Ligue 1	
Hassan Akesbi	FW	Nîmes Olympique*	AS Monaco FC	5–1	16 September 1959	Ligue 1	
Hassan Akesbi^{4}	FW	Nîmes Olympique*	OGC Nice	5–1	4 October 1959	Ligue 1	
Abdelkrim Merry	FW	FC Metz*	FC Tours	5–1	18 December 1982	Ligue 1	
Abdelkrim Merry	FW	FC Metz*	FC Rouen	3–2	22 January 1983	Ligue 1	
Abdelkrim Merry^{4}	FW	Le Havre AC*	SC Toulon	4–3	25 October 1985	Ligue 1	
Hassan Nader	FW	Farense*	Salgueiros	4–1	22 May 1994	Primeira Liga	
Hicham Zerouali	FW	Aberdeen	Dundee*	1–4	29 September 2001	SPL	
Marouane Chamakh	FW	Girondins de Bordeaux*	OGC Nice	5–1	14 August 2004	Ligue 1	
Mounir El Hamdaoui	FW	AZ Alkmaar	Willem II*	5–2	27 September 2008	Eredivisie	
Mounir El Hamdaoui	FW	AZ Alkmaar	Vitesse Arnhem*	3–0	27 February 2010	Eredivisie	
Mounir El Hamdaoui	FW	AZ Alkmaar*	RKC Waalwijk	6–2	13 March 2010	Eredivisie	
Oussama Assaidi	FW	Heerenveen*	Twente	6–2	12 December 2010	Eredivisie	
Omar Er Rafik^{4}	FW	Differdange 03*	UN Käerjeng 97	5–0	21 August 2011	BGL Ligue	
Omar Er Rafik	FW	Differdange 03*	Kayl-Tétange	4–1	29 April 2012	BGL Ligue	
Omar Er Rafik	FW	Differdange 03	Jeunesse Canach*	3–1	16 September 2012	BGL Ligue	
Abderrazak Hamdallah	FW	Aalesund*	Lillestrøm	7–1	13 May 2013	Tippeligaen	
Mounir El Hamdaoui	FW	Málaga*	Rayo Vallecano	5–0	15 September 2013	La Liga	
Omar Er Rafik	FW	Differdange 03*	Hamm Benfica	3–0	3 October 2013	BGL Ligue	
Abderrazak Hamdallah	FW	Aalesund	Viking*	3–1	25 October 2013	Tippeligaen	
Youssef El-Arabi	FW	Granada*	Málaga	3–1	8 November 2013	La Liga	
Samir Hadji	FW	Fola Esch	Victoria Rosport*	5–1	1 March 2015	BGL Ligue	
Moestafa El Kabir	FW	Gençlerbirliği*	Kasımpaşa	5–2	4 April 2015	Süper Lig	
Oussama Tannane^{4}	FW	Heracles*	Cambuur	6–1	22 August 2015	Eredivisie	
Sofiane Boufal	FW	Lille*	Gazélec Ajaccio	4–2	16 April 2016	Ligue 1	
Youssef El-Arabi	FW	Granada*	Levante	5–1	21 April 2016	La Liga	
Samir Hadji	FW	Fola Esch	UN Käerjeng 97*	4–0	7 August 2016	BGL Ligue	
Omar Er Rafik	FW	Differdange 03	UN Käerjeng 97*	5–3	4 December 2016	BGL Ligue	
Samir Hadji	FW	Fola Esch*	UNA Strassen	5–0	5 March 2017	BGL Ligue	
Omar Er Rafik	FW	Differdange 03*	UN Käerjeng 97	6–2	7 May 2017	BGL Ligue	
Omar Er Rafik^{5}	FW	Differdange 03*	Victoria Rosport	6–2	21 May 2017	BGL Ligue	
Samir Hadji	FW	Fola Esch*	Differdange 03	6–3	15 October 2017	BGL Ligue	
Samir Hadji^{4}	FW	Fola Esch*	US Esch	9–0	30 March 2018	BGL Ligue	
Samir Hadji	FW	Fola Esch*	Etzella Ettelbruck	6–0	21 October 2018	BGL Ligue	
Samir Hadji	FW	Fola Esch	Victoria Rosport*	4–1	4 November 2018	BGL Ligue	
Youssef En-Nesyri	FW	Leganés*	Real Betis	3–0	10 February 2019	La Liga	
Samir Hadji^{4}	FW	Fola Esch*	Rumelange	7–0	14 April 2019	BGL Ligue	
Youssef El-Arabi	FW	Olympiacos	Lamia*	4–0	12 January 2020	Super League 1	
Youssef El-Arabi	FW	Olympiacos*	Atromitos	4–0	17 October 2020	Super League 1	
Youssef El-Arabi	FW	Olympiacos*	Volos	4–1	5 December 2020	Super League 1	
Youssef En-Nesyri	FW	Sevilla*	Real Sociedad	3–2	9 January 2021	La Liga	
Youssef En-Nesyri	FW	Sevilla*	Cádiz CF	3–0	23 January 2021	La Liga	
Youssef El-Arabi	FW	Olympiacos	Atromitos*	3–0	15 December 2021	Super League 1	
Youssef El-Arabi	FW	Olympiacos	AEK Athens*	3–2	17 May 2022	Super League 1	

=== Multiple hat-tricks ===
The following table lists the minimum number of hat-tricks scored by players who have scored two or more hat-tricks.

Rank	Player	Hat-tricks	Last hat-trick
1	Samir Hadji	8	14 April 2019
2	Omar Er Rafik	7	21 May 2017
2	Youssef El-Arabi	7	17 May 2022
4	Hassan Akesbi	6	4 October 1959
5	Mounir El Hamdaoui	4	15 September 2013
6	Abdelkrim Merry	3	25 October 1985
6	Youssef En-Nesyri	3	23 January 2021
8	Abderrazak Hamdallah	2	25 October 2013

=== By Leagues ===
R.	League	Hat-tricks	Last hat-trick
1	BGL Ligue	15	14 April 2019
2	Ligue 1	14	16 April 2016
3	La Liga	6	23 January 2021
4	Eredivisie	5	22 August 2015
=	Super League 1	5	17 May 2022
6	Tippeligaen	2	25 October 2013
7	Scottish Premier League	1	29 September 2001
=	Primeira Liga	1	22 May 1994
=	Süper Lig	1	4 April 2015

== Moroccan players Titles in European clubs ==
This statistics of Moroccan players who won titles in Europe where the player must be Moroccan whether he played for the Morocco national football team or from a Moroccan father and mother. He has never been represent another country, but if he plays for another national team and then plays for the Moroccan team he is considered a Moroccan player, and the same thing if he played with teams under-23, under-20 and under-17.

Bold Still playing competitive football in Europe

#	Name	League	Cup	Others	Europe	TOTAL
1	Achraf Hakimi	(Italy) 2021, (France) 2022, 2023, 2024, 2025	(France) 2024, 2025	(Spain) 2017, (Germany) 2019, (France) 2022, 2023, 2024	(Europe) 2017, 2017, 2018, 2025, 2026	17
2	Badr El Kaddouri	(Ukraine) 2003, 2004, 2007, 2009 (Scotland) 2012	(Ukraine) 2003, 2005, 2006, 2007	(Ukraine) 2004, 2006, 2007, 2009, 2011		14
3	Sofian Benzouien	(Luxembourg) 2011, 2012, 2014, 2016, 2017, 2018, 2019	(Luxembourg) 2012, 2016, 2019			10
4	Brahim Díaz	(England) 2018, (Spain) 2020, 2024, (Italy) 2022		(England) 2019, (Spain) 2024, 2024	(Europe) 2024, 2024	9
=	Medhi Benatia	(Germany) 2015, 2016 (Italy) 2017, 2018, 2019	(Germany) 2016 (Italy) 2017, 2018	(Italy) 2018		9
=	Younès Belhanda	(France) 2012 (Ukraine) 2015, 2016 (Turkey) 2018, 2019	(Ukraine) 2014, 2015 (Turkey) 2019	(Turkey) 2019		9
	Hakim Ziyech	(Netherlands) 2019, (Turkey) 2024	(Netherlands) 2019	(Netherlands) 2019, (Turkey) 2023	(Europe) 2021, 2021, 2021	8
=	Noussair Mazraoui	(Netherlands) 2019, 2021, 2022 (Germany) 2023	(Netherlands) 2019, 2021	(Netherlands) 2019 (Germany) 2022		8
=	Ismael Saibari	(Netherlands) 2024, 2025, 2026		(Germany) 2026, (Netherlands) 2022, 2023, 2025		7
=	Mehdi Carcela	(Belgium) 2009 (Portugal) 2016	(Belgium) 2011, 2018	(Belgium) 2009 (Portugal) 2016, 2016		7
=	Nordin Amrabat	(Turkey) 2013 (Greece) 2023	(Turkey) 2014 (Greece) 2023	(Turkey) 2012, 2013 (Netherlands) 2008		7
=	Zakaria Labyad	(Netherlands) 2019, 2021, 2022	(Netherlands) 2012, 2019, 2021	(Netherlands) 2019		7
=	Noureddine Naybet	(Spain) 2000	(Spain) 2002 (Portugal) 1995	(Spain) 2000, 2002 (Portugal) 1995		6
=	Youssef El-Arabi	(Greece) 2020, 2021, 2022	(Greece) 2020	(Cyprus) 2024	(Europe) 2024	6
=	Mbark Boussoufa	(Belgium) 2007, 2010	(Belgium) 2008 (Russia) 2015	(Belgium) 2007, 2010		6
=	Manuel da Costa	(Netherlands) 2007. 2008 (Greece) 2016, 2017	(Turkey) 2020 (France) 2006			6
=	Samy Mmaee	(Hungary) 2021, 2022, 2023, 2024	(Belgium) 2016 (Hungary) 2022			6
=	Karim Zaza	(Denmark) 2005, 2008	(Denmark) 1997, 2001, 2002, 2005			6
=	Yassine Benajiba	(Luxembourg) 2014, 2016, 2017, 2018	(Luxembourg) 2013, 2016			6
=	Moha Rharsalla	(Slovakia) 2019, 2020, 2021	(Slovakia) 2018, 2020, 2021			6
=	Tarik Sektioui	(Portugal) 2007, 2008, 2009	(Portugal) 2009	(Portugal) 2006		5
=	Marouane Chamakh	(France) 2009	(France) 2007, 2009	(France) 2008, 2009		5
=	Rachid Bouaouzan	(Sweden) 2011	(Sweden) 2010, 2011	(Sweden) 2011, 2012		5
=	Sofyan Amrabat	(Belgium) 2020	(Netherlands) 2018 (England) 2024	(Netherlands) 2017, 2018		5
=	Ryan Mmaee	(Hungary) 2022, 2023 (Cyprus) 2026	(Belgium) 2016 (Hungary) 2022			5
=	Ismaïl Aissati	(Netherlands) 2006, 2008, 2012	(Netherlands) 2010			4
=	Youssef Chippo	(Portugal) 1998, 1999	(Portugal) 1998	(Portugal) 1998		4
=	Zouhair Feddal	(Portugal) 2021		(Portugal) 2021 (Portugal) 2022 (Portugal) 2021		4
=	Yassine Bounou	(Spain) 2014		(Spain) 2014	(Europe) 2020, 2023	4
=	Omar El Kaddouri	(Greece) 2019	(Greece) 2018, 2019, 2021			4
16	Mourad Hdiouad		(Bulgaria) 2004, 2006	(Bulgaria) 2006		3
=	Chadi Riad	(Spain) 2023	(England) 2025		(Europe) 2026	3
=	Adel Taarabt	(Portugal) 2019	(England) 2008	(Portugal) 2019		3
=	Ayoub El Kaabi	(Greece) 2025	(Greece) 2025		(Europe) 2024	3
=	Omar Er Rafik	(Luxembourg) 2018	(Luxembourg) 2014, 2015			3
=	Mounir El Hamdaoui	(Netherlands) 2009, 2011		(Netherlands) 2009		3
=	Karim El Ahmadi	(Netherlands) 2017	(Netherlands) 2016	(Netherlands) 2017		3
=	Oussama Idrissi	(Netherlands) 2021, 2023	(Netherlands) 2021			3
=	Couhaib Driouech	(Netherlands) 2025, 2026		(Netherlands) 2025		3
=	Nourdin Boukhari	(Poland) 2011	(Netherlands) 2006	(Netherlands) 2006		3
=	Chakib Benzoukane	(Bulgaria) 2009		(Bulgaria) 2007, 2009		3
=	Malcom Edjouma	(Romania) 2024, 2025		(Romania) 2024		3
=	Amine Khammas	(Cyprus) 2022		(Belgium) 2019 (Cyprus) 2022		3
=	Talal El Karkouri		(France) 2004		(Europe) 2001	2
=	Abdallah Zhar	(France) 1960, 1962				2
=	Hassan Hanini	(France) 1984, 1985				2
=	Youssef En-Nesyri				(Europe) 2020, 2023	2
=	Aymen Barkok		(Germany) 2018		(Europe) 2022	2
=	Gharib Amzine		(France) 2001		(Europe) 2001	2
=	Jamal Alioui		(Switzerland) 2009		(Europe) 2003	2
23	Samir Hadji	(Luxembourg) 2013, 2015				2
=	Abdelilah Saber	(Portugal) 2000		(Portugal) 2000		2
=	Rachid Hamdani		(Cyprus) 2013	(France) 2006		2
=	Khalid Fouhami	(Romania) 2000	(Romania) 2000			2
=	Adil Ramzi	(Netherlands) 2001, 2003				2
=	Chemsdine Talbi	(Belgium) 2024	(Belgium) 2025			2
=	Youssef Rabeh	(Bulgaria) 2009		(Bulgaria) 2009		2
=	Rachid Tiberkanine	(Bulgaria) 2009		(Bulgaria) 2009		2
=	Tarik El Jarmouni	(Ukraine) 2003	(Ukraine) 2003			2
=	Yacine Abdessadki		(France) 2001	(France) 2005		2
=	Mehdi Bourabia			(Bulgaria) 2015 (Turkey) 2017		2
=	Issam Chebake	(Cyprus) 2024		(Cyprus) 2024		2
=	Sofian Chakla	(Hungary) 2015	(Azerbaijan) 2025			2
=	Farid El Alagui		(Scotland) 2016	(Scotland) 2012		2
30	Salaheddine Bassir	(Spain) 2000				1
=	Ben Mohamed Bouchaïb	(France) 1948				1
=	Hassan M'jid	(France) 1951				1
=	Mohammed Abderrazack	(France) 1956				1
=	Abdelhamid El Kaoutari	(France) 2012				1
=	Karim Aït-Fana	(France) 2012				1
=	Nabil Dirar	(France) 2017 (Belgium) 2021				2
=	Hassan Akesbi	(France) 1962				1
=	Jaouad Zairi	(Greece) 2011				1
=	Hassan Souari	(Azerbaijan) 2009				1
=	Akram Roumani	(Belgium) 2002				1
=	Adil Rhaili	(Moldova) 2015				1
=	Faycal Rherras	(Azerbaijan) 2020				1
=	Sabir Bougrine	(Azerbaijan) 2021				1
=	Mustapha Oussalah	(Belgium) 2015				1
=	Sofiane Boufal	(Belgium) 2025				1
=	El Mehdi Sidqy		(Poland) 2010			1
=	Nabil Baha		(Greece) 2011			1
=	Hassan Nader		(Portugal) 1996			1
=	Issam El Adoua		(Portugal) 2013			1
=	Houssine Kharja		(Italy) 2011			1
=	Mehdi Taouil		(Scotland) 2012			1
=	Khalid Sinouh		(Netherlands) 2012			1
=	Aziz Bouderbala		(Switzerland) 1986			1
=	Smahi Triki		(Switzerland) 1998			1
=	Abdelfettah Boukhriss		(Belgium) 2011			1
=	Faouzi El Brazi		(Netherlands) 2001			1
=	Mohammed Chaouch		(France) 1997			1
=	Adnane Tighadouini		(Netherlands) 2017			1
=	Bilal Bari		(Bulgaria) 2022			1
=	Tarik Tissoudali		(Belgium) 2022			1
=	Benjamin Bouchouari		(Turkey) 2026			1
=	Yassine Benrahou		(Croatia) 2023			1
=	Rachid Alioui		(France) 2014			1
=	Zakaria Aboukhlal		(France) 2023			1
=	Mehdi Boukamir	(Cyprus) 2025				1
=	Ayyoub Allach		(Azerbaijan) 2023			1
=	Abdessalam Benjelloun			(Scotland) 2007		1
=	Merouane Zemmama			(Scotland) 2007		1
=	Karim M'Ghoghi			(France) 1997		1
=	Abdelilah Fahmi			(France) 2001		1

== Summary ==
=== List by League ===
R.	League	Titles	Winning Years
1	(Netherlands) Eredivisie	15	2001, 2003, 2006, 2007, 2008 x2, 2009, 2011, 2012, 2017, 2019 x3, 2021, 2022
2	(Luxembourg) National Division	14	2011, 2012, 2013, 2014 x2, 2015, 2016 x2, 2017 x2, 2018 x3, 2019
3	(Portugal) Primeira Liga	8	1998, 1999, 2000, 2007, 2008, 2009, 2016, 2019
4	Super League Greece	7	2011, 2016, 2017, 2019, 2020, 2021, 2022
=	(France) Ligue 1	7	1962, 2009, 2012 x3, 2017, 2022
6	(Ukraine) Ukrainian Premier League	6	2003, 2004, 2007, 2009, 2015, 2016
7	(Belgium) Belgian Pro League	4	2002, 2007, 2009, 2010
8	(Turkey) Süper Lig	3	2013, 2018, 2019
=	(Italy) Serie A	3	2017, 2018, 2021
=	(Slovakia) Slovak Super Liga	3	2019, 2020, 2021
=	(Bulgaria) A Group	3	2009 x3
11	(Germany) Bundesliga	2	2015, 2016
=	(Denmark) Danish Superliga	2	2005, 2008
=	(Spain) La Liga	2	2000 x2
14	(Moldova) Moldovan National Division	1	2015
=	(Poland) Ekstraklasa	1	2011
=	Azerbaijan Premier League	1	2009
=	(Scotland) Scottish Premier League	1	2012
=	(Romania) Liga I	1	2000

=== List by Cup ===
R.	Cup	Titles	Winning Years
1	(Netherlands) KNVB Cup	11	2001, 2006, 2010, 2012 x2, 2016, 2017, 2018–19 x3, 2021
=	Luxembourg Cup	7	2012, 2013, 2014, 2015, 2016 x2, 2019
2	(Ukraine) Ukrainian Cup	6	2003, 2005, 2006, 2007, 2014, 2015
4	Taça de Portugal	5	1995, 1996, 1998, 2009, 2013
5	(Denmark) Danish Cup	3	1995, 1997, 2005
=	(Belgium) Belgian Cup	3	2008, 2011, 2018
=	Coupe de France	3	1997, 2001, 2004
=	(Italy) Coppa Italia	3	2011, 2017, 2018
=	(Greece) Greek Cup	3	2011, 2018, 2019
=	(Slovakia) Slovak Super Liga	3	2018, 2020, 2021
11	(Bulgaria) Bulgarian Cup	2	2004, 2006
=	(Turkey) Turkish Cup	2	2014, 2019
=	(Switzerland) Swiss Cup	2	1986, 1998
11	(Germany) DFB-Pokal	1	2016
=	(Russia) Russian Cup	1	2015
=	(Spain) Copa del Rey	1	2002
=	(Cyprus) Cypriot Cup	1	2013
=	(Romania) Cupa României	1	2000
=	(Poland) Polish Cup	1	2010
=	(Scotland) Scottish Cup	1	2012

=== List by League Cup ===
R.	Super Cup	Titles	Winning Years
1	(France) Coupe de la Ligue	5	2005, 2006 x2, 2007, 2009
2	(Scotland) Scottish League Cup	2	2007 x2
3	(Portugal) Taça da Liga	1	2016

=== List by Super Cup ===
R.	Super Cup	Titles	Winning Years
1	(Netherlands) Johan Cruijff-schaal	7	2002, 2005, 2009, 2017 x2, 2018, 2019
2	(Portugal) Supertaça	5	1995, 1998, 2000, 2006, 2016
=	(Bulgaria) Bulgarian Supercup	5	2006, 2007, 2009 x2, 2015
=	(Ukraine) Ukrainian Super Cup	5	2004, 2006, 2007, 2009, 2011
5	(Belgium) Belgian Super Cup	3	2007, 2009, 2010
=	(Spain) Supercopa de España	3	2000, 2002, 2017
=	(France) Trophée des Champions	3	2008, 2009, 2022
8	(Turkey) Turkish Super Cup	2	2013, 2017
9	(Italy) Supercoppa Italiana	1	2018

=== List by intercontinental Cup UEFA ===
R.	Intercontinental Cup	Titles	Winning Years
1	UEFA Europa League	4	2020 x2, 2023 x2
2	UEFA Champions League	2	2018, 2021
=	UEFA Super Cup	2	2017, 2021
=	FIFA Club World Cup	2	2017, 2021

== Individual honours ==
=== List Top goalscorers Moroccan players in Europe ===
R.	player	Titles	League Top goalscorers Years
1	Youssef El-Arabi	3	(Greece) 2020 (20 goals), 2021 (22 goals), (Olympiacos) – (Cyprus) 2025 (14 goals), (APOEL Nicosie)
3	Omar Er Rafik	2	(Luxembourg) 2012 (23 goals), 2017 (26 goals), (FC Differdange 03)
3	Ryan Mmaee	1	(Cyprus) 2026 (25 goals, Omonia Nicosia)
4	Mounir El Hamdaoui	1	(Netherlands) 2009 (24 goals), (AZ Alkmaar)
=	Aatif Chahechouhe	1	(Turkey) 2014 (17 goals), (Sivasspor)
=	Samir Hadji	1	(Luxembourg) 2019 (23 goals), (Fola Esch)

=== Moroccan players of the Year in European Leagues ===
R.	player	Titles	League player of the Year
1	Mbark Boussoufa	3	(Belgium) 2006 (Gent), 2009, 2010 (Anderlecht)
2	Ahmed El Aouad	2	(Luxembourg) 2001 (CS Hobscheid), 2003 (CS Grevenmacher)
3	Mounir El Hamdaoui	1	(Netherlands) 2009 (AZ Alkmaar)
=	Karim El Ahmadi	1	(Netherlands) 2017 (AFC Ajax)
=	Hakim Ziyech	1	(Netherlands) 2018 (AFC Ajax)

== Most expensive transfers in the history of Moroccan players ==
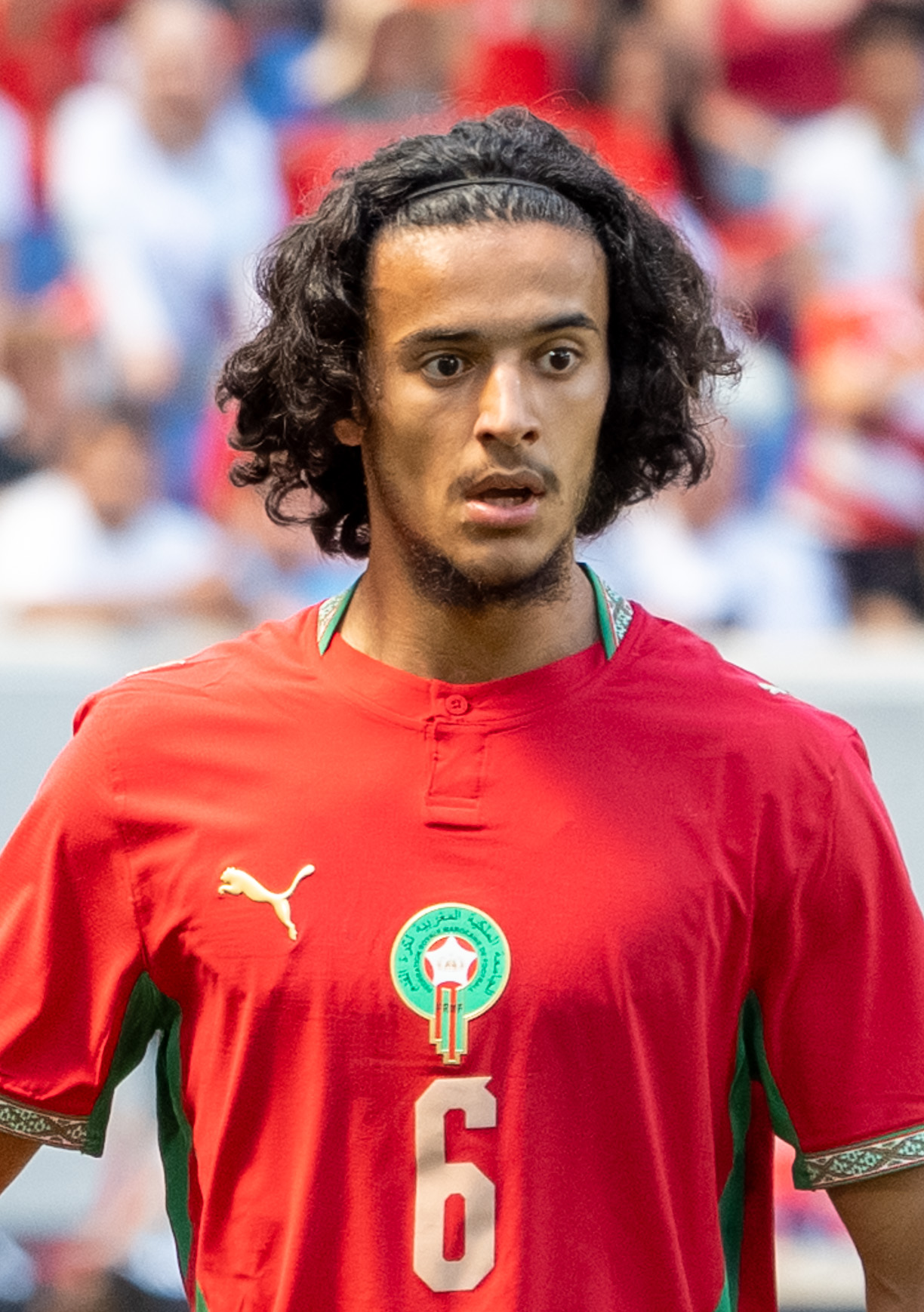
Ayyoub Bouaddi became the most expensive transfer deal for a Moroccan player upon moving from Lille to Manchester City for €100 million.

As of 23 August 2026; during the 2026 summer transfer window.

Fee broke the Moroccan record at the time of the transfer
Fee broke the national club record
Fee broke the record for an African
Fee broke the record for a Moroccan teenager at the time of the transfer

List of Most expensive transfers in the history of Moroccan players with more than 15 Million Euro.
R.	Year	Player	Fee(M €)	From	To	Ref
1	2026	Ayyoub Bouaddi	€100	(France) Lille	(England) Manchester City	
2	2021	Achraf Hakimi	€68	(Italy) Inter Milan	(France) Paris Saint-Germain	
3	2026	Ismael Saibari	€50	(Netherlands) PSV Eindhoven	(Germany) Bayern Munich	
4	2020	Achraf Hakimi	€43	(Spain) Real Madrid	(Italy) Inter Milan	
5	2020	Hakim Ziyech	€40	(Netherlands) Ajax	(England) Chelsea	
6	2022	Nayef Aguerd	€35	(France) Rennes	(England) West Ham United	
7	2025	Eliesse Ben Seghir	€32	(France) Monaco	(Germany) Bayer Leverkusen	
8	2014	Medhi Benatia	€28	(Italy) Roma	(Germany) Bayern Munich	
9	2018	Issa Diop	€25	(France) Toulouse	(England) West Ham United	
10	2025	Neil El Aynaoui	€23.5	(France) Lens	(Italy) Roma	
11	2025	Nayef Aguerd	€23	(England) West Ham United	(France) Marseille	

== League statistics rest of the world ==
List of Moroccan players with 100 or more appearances since the 1999–2000 season
R.	Player	Rest of the world Club(s)	Apps
1	Mehdi Ballouchy	(United States) Salt Lake (46) – Colorado (77) – New York Red Bulls (51) – San Jose (11) – New York City (24) – (Canada) Vancouver (7)	216
2	Adil Hermach	(Saudi Arabia) Al-Hilal (59) – (United Arab Emirates) Al-Wahda (33) – Al Dhafra (47) – Ajman (24)	163
3	Anouar Diba	(Qatar) Al-Wakrah (92) – Lekhwiya (6) – Al Kharaitiyat (49) – (United Arab Emirates) Al-Nasr (16)	163
4	Tarik El Janaby	(Indonesia) Sriwijaya (30) – (Malaysia) Pahang FA (38) – (Bahrain) Al Ahli Club (47) – (Bangladesh) Sheikh Russel KC (35)	150
5	Abderrazak Hamdallah	(China) Guangzhou R&F (25) – (Qatar) El Jaish (21) – Al-Rayyan SC (18) – (Saudi Arabia) Al-Nassr (77) – Al-Ittihad (52) – Al-Shabab (22)	215
Note: Total appearances/goals include all competitions in Asia (league, domestic cups, and continental tournaments). Last updated 5 January 2026
6	Issam El Adoua	(Kuwait) Al Qadsia (18) – (China) Chongqing Lifan (29) – (United Arab Emirates) Al Dhafra (53)	100

List of Moroccan players with 50 or more goals
R.	Player	Rest of the world Club(s)	Goals
1	Abderrazak Hamdallah	(China) Guangzhou R&F (25) – (Qatar) El Jaish (21) – Al-Rayyan SC (18) – (Saudi Arabia) Al-Nassr (77) – Al-Ittihad (52) – Al-Shabab (27) –Al-Taawoun (2)	222
2	Youssef El-Arabi	(Saudi Arabia) Al-Hilal (12) – (Qatar) Al-Duhail (76)	88
3	Mourad Batna	(Saudi Arabia) Al-Fateh (51) – (United Arab Emirates) Al-Wahda (15) – Emirates (12)	78
4	Karim El Berkaoui	(Saudi Arabia) Al-Raed (60) – (United Arab Emirates) Al-Dhafra (10)	70
5	Rachid Rokki	(Qatar) Al-Khor – Umm Salal (65)	65
6	Tarik El Janaby	(Indonesia) Sriwijaya (14) – (Malaysia) Pahang FA (20) – (Bahrain) Al Ahli Club (18) – (Bangladesh) Sheikh Russel KC (7)	59
7	Adil Ramzi	(Qatar) Al-Wakrah (47) – Umm Salal (4)	51
8	Ahmed Bahja	(Saudi Arabia) Al-Hilal – Al-Ittihad – Al-Nassr (50)	50
9	Soufiane Rahimi	(United Arab Emirates) Al Ain (50)	50

As of 5 January 2026

== List of Moroccan players hat-tricks in the rest of the world Leagues ==
Position key: GK – Goalkeeper; DF – Defender; MF – Midfielder; FW – Forward; ^{4} – Player scored four goals; ^{5} – Player scored five goals; * – The home team

Player	Position	For	Against	Result	Date	League	Ref
Anouar Diba	MF	Al-Wakrah*	Qatar SC	3–1	18 October 2008	Qatar Stars League	
Hicham Aboucherouane	FW	Al-Ittihad*	Al-Watani	7–2	15 December 2008	Saudi Professional League	
Adil Ramzi	FW	Al-Wakrah*	Al Shamal	7–0	5 November 2009	Qatar Stars League	
Hicham Aboucherouane	FW	Al-Ittihad*	Al Hazm	5–2	6 January 2010	Saudi Professional League	
Abdelkarim Benhania^{4}	FW	Al-Wahda*	Al-Fateh	6–0	28 January 2010	Saudi Professional League	
Soufiane Alloudi	FW	Al Wasl FC	Emirates Club*	5–4	7 May 2010	UAE Pro-League	
Anouar Diba^{4}	MF	Al-Wakrah	Al-Sailiya*	5–2	12 March 2011	Qatar Stars League	
Youssef El-Arabi	FW	Al-Hilal	Al-Qadisiyah*	5–4	20 October 2011	Saudi Professional League	
Monsef Zerka	FW	Tanjong Pagar	Warriors FC*	6–1	27 February 2013	S.League	
Abderrazak Hamdallah	FW	Guangzhou R&F	Shanghai Shenxin*	3–1	22 March 2014	Chinese Super League	
Monsef Zerka	FW	Tanjong Pagar	Young Lions*	3–2	26 March 2014	S.League	
Abderrazak Hamdallah	FW	Guangzhou R&F*	Hangzhou Greentown	6–2	30 March 2014	Chinese Super League	
Mounir El Hamdaoui	FW	Umm Salal*	Al-Gharafa	4–4	27 February 2016	Qatar Stars League	
Mouhcine Iajour	FW	Al-Ahli	Al-Duhail*	5–4	10 April 2016	Qatar Stars League	
Youssef El-Arabi	FW	Al-Duhail*	Al-Arabi	4–1	28 October 2016	Qatar Stars League	
Youssef El-Arabi	FW	Al-Duhail*	Al-Shahania	10–0	21 December 2016	Qatar Stars League	
Youssef El-Arabi	FW	Al-Duhail*	Al-Khor	6–0	3 February 2017	Qatar Stars League	
Mourad Batna	FW	Emirates Club	Shabab*	4–0	4 February 2017	UAE Pro-League	
Yassine Salhi^{4}	FW	Dhafra*	Dibba	5–0	15 April 2017	UAE Pro-League	
Youssef El-Arabi^{4}	FW	Al-Duhail*	Al-Ahli	6–1	15 October 2017	Qatar Stars League	
Youssef El-Arabi	FW	Al-Duhail*	Al-Kharaitiyat	8–2	19 November 2017	Qatar Stars League	
Youssef El-Arabi	FW	Al-Duhail	Qatar SC*	6–0	13 January 2018	Qatar Stars League	
Rachid Tiberkanine	FW	Al-Sailiya	Al-Kharaitiyat*	5–0	4 November 2018	Qatar Stars League	
Youssef El-Arabi	FW	Al-Duhail SC*	Al-Shahania	5–1	8 November 2018	Qatar Stars League	
Abderrazak Hamdallah^{4}	FW	Al-Nassr*	Al-Raed	4–0	14 December 2018	Saudi Professional League	
Abderrazak Hamdallah^{4}	FW	Al-Nassr	Al-Wehda*	4–0	16 March 2019	Saudi Professional League	
Abderrazak Hamdallah	FW	Al-Nassr	Al-Raed*	5–0	4 April 2019	Saudi Professional League	
Abderrazak Hamdallah	FW	Al-Nassr	Al-Hazem*	3–0	11 May 2019	Saudi Professional League	
Abderrazak Hamdallah	FW	Al-Nassr	Al-Fayha*	4–1	28 December 2019	Saudi Professional League	
Abderrazak Hamdallah	FW	Al-Nassr	Al-Shabab*	4–2	14 February 2020	Saudi Professional League	
Karim El Berkaoui^{4}	FW	Al-Raed*	Damac	4–2	31 January 2021	Saudi Professional League	
Abderrazak Hamdallah	FW	Al-Ittihad	Al Ahli*	4–3	26 February 2022	Saudi Professional League	

=== Multiple hat-tricks ===
Rank	Player	Hat-tricks	Last hat-trick
1	Abderrazak Hamdallah	9	14 February 2020
2	Youssef El-Arabi	8	8 November 2018
3	Hicham Aboucherouane	2	6 January 2010
3	Anouar Diba	2	12 March 2011
3	Monsef Zerka	2	26 March 2014
6	Adil Ramzi	1	5 November 2009
6	Abdelkarim Benhania	1	28 January 2010
6	Karim El Berkaoui	1	31 January 2021
6	Soufiane Alloudi	1	7 May 2010
6	Mounir El Hamdaoui	1	27 February 2016
6	Mouhcine Iajour	1	10 April 2016
6	Mourad Batna	1	4 February 2017
6	Yassine Salhi	1	15 April 2017
6	Rachid Tiberkanine	1	4 November 2018

=== By Leagues ===
R.	League	Hat-tricks	Last hat-trick
1	Qatar Stars League	13	8 November 2018
2	Saudi Professional League	12	26 February 2022
3	UAE Pro-League	3	15 April 2017
4	Chinese Super League	2	30 March 2014
=	S.League	2	26 March 2014

== Moroccan players Titles In the rest of the world clubs ==
Bold Still playing competitive football In the rest of the world League

#	Name	League	Cup	Others	International	TOTAL
1	Achraf Bencharki	(Saudi Arabia) 2018, (Egypt) 2021, 2022, (Egypt) 2025	(Egypt) 2019, 2021	(Saudi Arabia) 2018, (Egypt) 2020, 2025	(Egypt) 2020	10
2	Ahmed Bahja	(Saudi Arabia) 1997, 1999	(Saudi Arabia) 1997, 1999, 1995, (Qatar) 1996, 1998	(Saudi Arabia) 1997	(Saudi Arabia) 1999, (Saudi Arabia) 1995	10
3	Mehdi Berrahma	(Kuwait) 2022, 2023, 2024, 2026	(Kuwait) 2021, 2023	(Kuwait) 2022, 2024	(Kuwait) 2026	9
3	Hussein Ammouta	(Qatar) 2000, 2003	(Qatar) 2000, 2001	(Qatar) 1998, 2002, 1998, 2000		8
4	Walid Azaro	(Egypt) 2018, 2019, 2020	(Egypt) 2017, 2020	(Egypt) 2017	(Egypt) 2020	7
5	Abderrazak Hamdallah	(Saudi Arabia) 2019, 2023	(Saudi Arabia) 2019, 2020, 2022	(Qatar) 2016, (Qatar) 2018		7
6	Youssef El-Arabi	(Qatar) 2017, 2018	(Qatar) 2018, 2018, 2019, 2016	(Saudi Arabia) 2012		7
7	Saïd Chiba	(Saudi Arabia) 1996 (Qatar) 2003	(Saudi Arabia) 1995 (Qatar) 2004	(Saudi Arabia) 1996	(Saudi Arabia) 1994, 1995	7
7	Soufiane Rahimi	(United Arab Emirates) 2022, 2026	(United Arab Emirates) 2022, 2026	.	(United Arab Emirates) 2024	5
8	Yassine Bounou	(Saudi Arabia) 2024	(Saudi Arabia) 2024, 2026	(Saudi Arabia) 2023, 2024		5
9	Youssef Chippo	(Saudi Arabia) 1996 (Qatar) 1997, 2004	(Qatar) 2005	(Qatar) 1997		5
10	Abdeljalil Hadda	(Saudi Arabia) 1997	(Saudi Arabia) 1997 (Tunisia) 1998	(Saudi Arabia) 1997	(Tunisia) 1997	5
10	Bouchaib El Moubarki		(Qatar) 2005, 2006		(Qatar) 2001, (Saudi Arabia) 2002	4
10	Hicham Aboucherouane	(Saudi Arabia) 2009	(Tunisia) 2007, 2008 (Saudi Arabia) 2010			4 == Deuxièmement ==
	Ahmed Jahouh	(India) 2020, 2021, 2023				3
	Soufiane Bouftini	(United Arab Emirates) 2024	(United Arab Emirates) 2024			2
	Romain Saïss	(Qatar) 2025, 2026				2
11	Mourad Batna			(United Arab Emirates) 2018, 2018		2
12	Issam El Adoua	(Kuwait) 2011				1
13	Tarik El Janaby	(Bangladesh) 2013				1
14	Mbark Boussoufa	(United Arab Emirates) 2017				1
15	Medhi Benatia		(Qatar) 2019			1
16	Aziz Ben Askar		(Qatar) 2008			1
17	Soufiane Alloudi		(United Arab Emirates) 2009			1
18	Said El Bezouz		(Algeria) 2001			1
19	Yassine Salhi		(Kuwait) 2016			1
20	Hamid Ahaddad				(Egypt) 2019	1

== Summary ==
=== List by League ===
R.	League	Titles	Winning Years
1	(Saudi Arabia) Saudi Professional League	8	1996 x2, 1997, 1999, 2001, 2009, 2018, 2019
2	Qatar Stars League	6	1997, 2003, 2004, 2000, 2017, 2018
3	(Egypt) Egyptian Premier League	2	2018, 2019
4	(Kuwait) Kuwaiti Premier League	1	2011
=	(United Arab Emirates) UAE Pro-League	1	2017
=	Bangladesh Premier League	1	2013

=== List by Cup ===
R.	Cup	Titles	Winning Years
1	Emir of Qatar Cup	7	2000, 2001, 2005, 2008, 2018, 2019 x2
2	(Tunisia) Tunisian Cup	3	2002, 2007, 2008
3	(United Arab Emirates) UAE President's Cup	1	2009
=	Kuwait Emir Cup	1	2016
=	Egypt Cup	1	2019
=	(Algeria) Algerian Cup	1	2001

=== List by League Cup ===
R.	League Cup	Titles	Winning Years
1	(Saudi Arabia) Saudi Crown Prince Cup	4	1995, 1997, 2001, 2012
2	Qatar Crown Prince Cup	2	1998, 2018
3	(United Arab Emirates) UAE League Cup	1	2018

=== List by Super Cup ===
R.	Super Cup	Titles	Winning Years
1	(Qatar) Sheikh Jassim Cup	2	1998, 2000
=	(Egypt) Egyptian Super Cup	2	2017, 2020
3	(Saudi Arabia) Saudi Super Cup	1	2018
=	(United Arab Emirates) UAE Super Cup	1	2018

== List Top goalscorers Moroccan players In the rest of the world clubs ==
Rank	player	Titles	League Top goalscorers Years
1	Abderrazak Hamdallah	3	(Qatar) 2016 (21 goals), (El Jaish SC), (Saudi Arabia) 2019 (34 goals), (Al-Nassr), 2020 (29 goals), (Al-Nassr)
=	Youssef El-Arabi	2	(Qatar) 2017 (24 goals), (Lekhwiya), 2018 (26 goals), (Lekhwiya)
3	Ahmed Bahja	1	(Saudi Arabia) 1997 (21 goals), (Al-Ittihad)
=	Hussein Amotta	1	(Qatar) 1998 (10 goals), (Al-Sadd SC)
=	Rachid Rokki	1	(Qatar) 2003 (15 goals), (Al-Khor SC)
=	Hicham Aboucherouane	1	(Saudi Arabia) 2009 (12 goals), (Al-Ittihad)
=	Walid Azaro	1	(Egypt) 2018 (18 goals), (Al Ahly)
=	Hamza Khabba	1	(Kuwait) 2024 (21 buts), (Al-Arabi SC
=	Mostafa Mahrous	1	(United Arab Emirates) 1979 (16 buts), (Al Ahli)

== Notes ==
1. Born in France
2. Born in Netherlands
3. Born in Belgium
4. Born in Spain
5. Born in Denmark
