= Hanini =

Hanini is an Arabic surname. Notable people with the surname include:

- Hassan Hanini (born 1958), Moroccan footballer
- Lassâad Hanini (born 1971), Tunisian footballer
