= Alioui =

Alioui is a surname. Notable people with the surname include:

- Jamal Alioui (born 1982), French-born Moroccan footballer and coach
- Nabil Alioui (born 1999), French footballer
- Rachid Alioui (born 1992), French-born Moroccan footballer
