= 1961–62 French Division 1 =

24th season of French Division 1

Division Nationale
- Season: 1961–62
- Champions: Reims (6th title)
- Relegated: Saint-Étienne; Sochaux; Le Havre; Metz
- European Cup: Reims
- Cup Winners' Cup: Saint-Étienne
- Matches: 380
- Goals: 1,192 (3.14 per match)
- Top goalscorer: Sékou Touré (25)

Stade de Reims won Division 1 season 1961/1962 of the French Association Football League with 48 points.

== Participating teams ==
- Angers SCO
- Le Havre AC
- RC Lens
- Olympique Lyonnais
- FC Metz
- AS Monaco
- SO Montpellier
- FC Nancy
- OGC Nice
- Nîmes Olympique
- RC Paris
- Stade de Reims
- Stade Rennais UC
- FC Rouen
- AS Saint-Etienne
- UA Sedan-Torcy
- FC Sochaux-Montbéliard
- Stade Français FC
- RC Strasbourg
- Toulouse FC
Location of teams in 1961–62 Division 1

== Final table ==
Pos	Team	Pld	W	D	L	GF	GA	GAv	Pts	Qualification or relegation
1	Reims (C)	38	21	6	11	83	60	1.383	48	Qualification to European Cup first round
2	Racing Paris	38	21	6	11	86	63	1.365	48	
3	Nîmes	38	21	5	12	68	60	1.133	47	
4	Nancy	38	16	12	10	52	46	1.130	44	
5	Sedan	38	16	11	11	63	49	1.286	43	
6	Monaco	38	17	9	12	65	57	1.140	43	
7	Lens	38	19	4	15	67	52	1.288	42	
8	Montpellier	38	15	9	14	69	64	1.078	39	
9	Rouen	38	14	10	14	57	56	1.018	38	
10	Stade Français	38	13	12	13	58	57	1.018	38	
11	Toulouse	38	16	6	16	62	61	1.016	38	
12	Rennes	38	13	12	13	58	63	0.921	38	
13	Nice	38	16	6	16	53	64	0.828	38	
14	Angers	38	13	10	15	56	59	0.949	36	
15	Strasbourg	38	12	10	16	45	54	0.833	34	
16	Lyon	38	13	7	18	57	62	0.919	33	
17	Saint-Étienne (R)	38	10	10	18	55	60	0.917	30	Cup Winners' Cup preliminary round and relegation to French Division 2
18	Sochaux (R)	38	8	12	18	55	69	0.797	28	Relegation to French Division 2
19	Le Havre (R)	38	7	14	17	34	57	0.596	28	Relegation to French Division 2
20	Metz (R)	38	9	9	20	49	79	0.620	27	Relegation to French Division 2

Rules for classification: Victory: 2 points, Draw: 1 point, Defeat: 0 points
(C) Champions; (R) Relegated

Promoted from Division 2, who will play in Division 1 season 1962/1963

- FC Grenoble:Champion of Division 2
- US Valenciennes-Anzin:runner-up of Division 2
- Bordeaux: Third place
- Olympique de Marseille: Fourth place, Inter-Cities Fairs Cup

== Results ==
Home \ Away	ANG	LHA	RCL	OL	MET	ASM	SOM	FCN	NIC	NMS	RCP	REI	REN	ROU	STE	SED	SOC	SFF	RCS	TOU
Angers		0–0	0–2	1–1	3–1	2–0	1–0	2–2	0–0	8–3	2–3	2–0	1–1	1–0	2–1	2–2	3–1	2–2	1–1	1–2
Le Havre	0–1		0–0	1–2	2–1	0–1	2–2	1–1	3–0	1–2	0–4	1–2	2–0	1–1	1–0	1–1	3–1	1–0	0–2	2–0
Lens	2–1	2–0		1–0	5–2	5–0	5–1	4–1	4–2	3–1	2–3	3–4	1–0	1–0	2–1	1–0	3–1	2–1	0–0	4–0
Lyon	2–0	1–1	3–0		1–0	2–4	1–2	1–3	1–2	0–0	2–0	1–3	0–0	1–1	4–0	2–2	1–0	1–2	2–1	1–3
Metz	1–2	0–0	1–0	2–1		1–1	1–1	0–1	2–1	3–1	2–4	2–1	0–1	0–1	6–0	2–2	1–1	0–2	2–0	1–1
Monaco	5–0	2–2	2–1	3–1	4–0		5–3	1–1	1–2	1–1	1–2	0–1	4–2	0–0	1–0	2–1	1–1	2–0	0–2	4–3
Montpellier	0–0	1–1	2–0	4–2	2–0	0–2		1–0	3–2	3–5	2–1	1–3	3–1	4–1	4–3	5–0	4–1	4–0	1–1	3–3
Nancy	3–2	1–1	1–0	5–1	3–0	1–2	3–1		2–0	0–0	0–0	1–1	2–2	2–1	2–1	0–3	1–0	2–1	3–1	2–1
Nice	0–2	4–0	2–0	0–2	2–1	1–1	1–0	3–1		1–3	1–0	4–1	1–0	1–1	3–1	3–2	1–1	1–0	3–2	3–1
Nîmes	2–0	3–2	2–1	2–1	3–1	1–1	3–1	1–1	3–0		2–4	2–1	3–0	3–2	1–0	0–1	2–1	4–0	1–0	2–0
Racing Paris	4–3	4–1	1–0	0–4	11–2	3–0	2–1	2–0	3–1	0–4		2–6	3–1	0–2	1–2	2–2	2–2	3–1	3–3	2–0
Reims	2–0	3–0	4–1	0–4	5–3	1–0	2–1	2–0	5–0	2–0	1–4		2–3	2–2	1–1	1–3	2–1	0–4	5–1	5–1
Rennes	2–1	1–0	2–1	2–0	1–2	4–6	1–1	3–0	2–2	4–2	2–3	2–2		3–2	1–1	1–0	2–1	2–3	1–0	1–1
Rouen	2–1	0–0	2–1	3–4	3–2	2–1	3–2	0–2	2–1	1–2	2–1	2–2	4–1		3–1	2–3	2–2	2–1	1–0	0–1
Saint-Étienne	2–3	1–1	3–4	2–0	2–2	5–1	1–1	1–1	1–2	5–0	1–1	2–0	2–1	2–0		1–0	2–2	1–1	0–1	4–1
Sedan	0–2	2–0	1–1	3–1	2–0	2–0	1–0	1–1	2–2	5–1	0–1	0–3	0–0	2–2	1–0		4–1	1–1	5–0	1–0
Sochaux	5–2	6–1	1–2	1–2	1–1	1–4	1–1	0–1	2–0	3–1	4–3	2–1	1–2	1–1	0–2	2–0		2–3	0–0	2–0
Stade Français	1–1	1–1	2–2	2–1	2–2	1–1	3–0	1–0	4–0	1–0	2–0	2–4	2–2	2–4	1–1	4–2	1–1		0–1	3–4
Strasbourg	2–1	3–1	3–1	5–2	0–1	0–1	1–2	2–2	2–0	2–1	1–3	1–1	1–1	1–0	2–1	1–2	1–1	0–0		0–1
Toulouse	2–0	1–0	2–0	1–1	6–1	2–0	1–2	2–0	3–1	0–1	1–1	1–2	3–3	1–0	2–1	1–4	6–1	0–1	4–1	

Legend: Blue = home team win; Yellow = draw; Red = away team win.

== Top goalscorers ==
Rank	Player	Club	Goals
1	(Ivory Coast) Sékou Touré	Montpellier	25
2	(Morocco) Hassan Akesbi	Reims	23
3	(France) Michel Lafranceschina	Lens	20
4	(France) (Poland) Casimir Koza	Strasbourg	19
5	(France) Fleury Di Nallo	Lyon	18
5	(Paraguay) José Parodi	Nîmes	18
5	(France) Khennane Mahi	Rennes	18
8	(France) Roger Piantoni	Reims	16
9	(France) Michel Stievenart	Angers	15
9	(France) Jean-Jacques Marcel	Racing Paris	15

== Attendances ==
#	Club	Average
1	Racing	18,618
2	Strasbourg	12,088
3	Stade français	11,722
4	Stade rennais	11,026
5	MHSC	10,824
6	Reims	9,856
7	Saint-Étienne	9,546
8	Rouen	8,712
9	Lens	8,647
10	Nîmes	8,586
11	Nice	8,131
12	Olympique lyonnais	8,014
13	Toulouse	7,376
14	Nancy	7,236
15	Metz	6,994
16	Le Havre	6,697
17	Sochaux	6,277
18	Sedan	6,023
19	Angers	5,825
20	Monaco	3,573
