= 2009 Bulgarian Supercup =

Финал за Суперкупата на България 2009
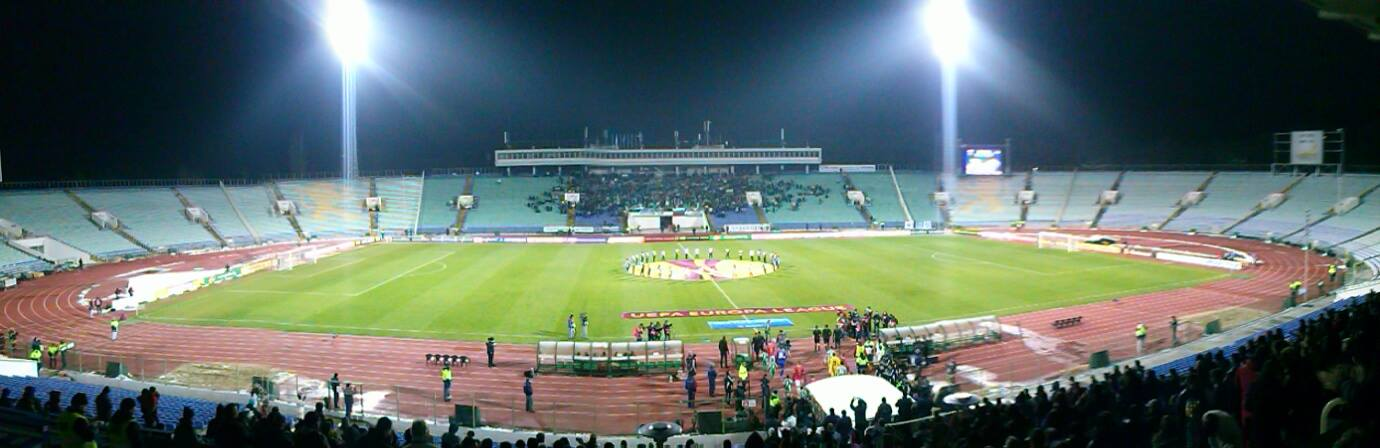
Levski Sofia	Litex Lovech
A Group	Bulgarian Cup
1	0
- Date: 1 August 2009
- Venue: Vasil Levski National Stadium, Sofia
- Man of the Match: Cédric Bardon
- Referee: Stefan Spasov (Pernik)
- Attendance: 7,000

The 2009 Bulgarian Supercup was the seventh Bulgarian Supercup match, a football match which was contested between the 2008–09 A Professional Football Group champion, Levski Sofia, and the 2008–09 Bulgarian Cup holder, Litex Lovech. The match was held on 1 August 2009 at the Vasil Levski National Stadium in Sofia, Bulgaria. Levski beat Litex 1–0 thanks to a second-half goal from Frenchman Cédric Bardon to win their third Bulgarian Supercup.

== Match details ==
1 August 2009
20:30 EET

Levski Sofia	1–0	Litex Lovech
Bardon 65'	Report

Vasil Levski National Stadium, Sofia
Attendance: 7,000
Referee: Stefan Spasov (Pernik)

Levski Sofia	Litex Lovech

Levski Sofia:
GK	1	(Bulgaria) Georgi Petkov (c) (yellow card) 80'
DF	15	(Morocco) Chakib Benzoukane
DF	2	(Bulgaria) Victor Genev
DF	11	(Bulgaria) Elin Topuzakov
DF	25	(Bulgaria) Lúcio Wagner (substituted off) 74'
MF	8	(Bulgaria) Georgi Sarmov (substituted off) 51'
MF	6	(Morocco) Rachid Tiberkanine (yellow card) 35' (yellow-red card) 69'
MF	27	(France) Cédric Bardon
FW	24	(Bulgaria) Nikolay Dimitrov (substituted off) 60'
FW	21	(Brazil) Zé Soares
FW	99	(Bulgaria) Georgi Hristov
Substitutes:
GK	12	(Bulgaria) Bozhidar Mitrev
DF	14	(Bulgaria) Veselin Minev (substituted in) 74'
MF	16	(Bulgaria) Marian Ognyanov
FW	17	(Nigeria) Deniran Ortega
MF	20	(Brazil) Joãozinho (substituted in) 60'
FW	29	(Bulgaria) Ismail Isa
MF	45	(Bulgaria) Vladimir Gadzhev (substituted in) 51' (injured) 83'
Manager:
(Serbia) Ratko Dostanić

Litex Lovech:
GK	1	(Serbia) Uroš Golubović
DF	33	(Bulgaria) Nikolay Bodurov
DF	2	(France) Alexandre Barthe
DF	22	(Bulgaria) Plamen Nikolov
DF	5	(Bulgaria) Mihail Venkov (yellow card) 51' (substituted off) 84'
MF	10	(Brazil) Sandrinho
MF	25	(Bulgaria) Radostin Kishishev (c)
MF	23	(Serbia) Nebojša Jelenković (substituted off) 81'
FW	7	(Bulgaria) Hristo Yanev (yellow card) 89'
FW	32	(Bulgaria) Ivelin Popov
FW	9	(Bulgaria) Svetoslav Todorov (substituted off) 62'
Substitutes:
GK	12	(Bulgaria) Todor Todorov
DF	3	(Bulgaria) Petar Zanev (substituted in) 84'
DF	6	(Bulgaria) Ivaylo Petkov
MF	13	(Bulgaria) Maksim Stoykov
MF	17	(Bulgaria) Georgi Milanov (substituted in) 81'
MF	23	(Brazil) Diego (substituted in) 62'
Manager:
(Bulgaria) Stanimir Stoilov
