= Michaël Chrétien Basser =

Footballer (born 1984)

Michaël Chrétien
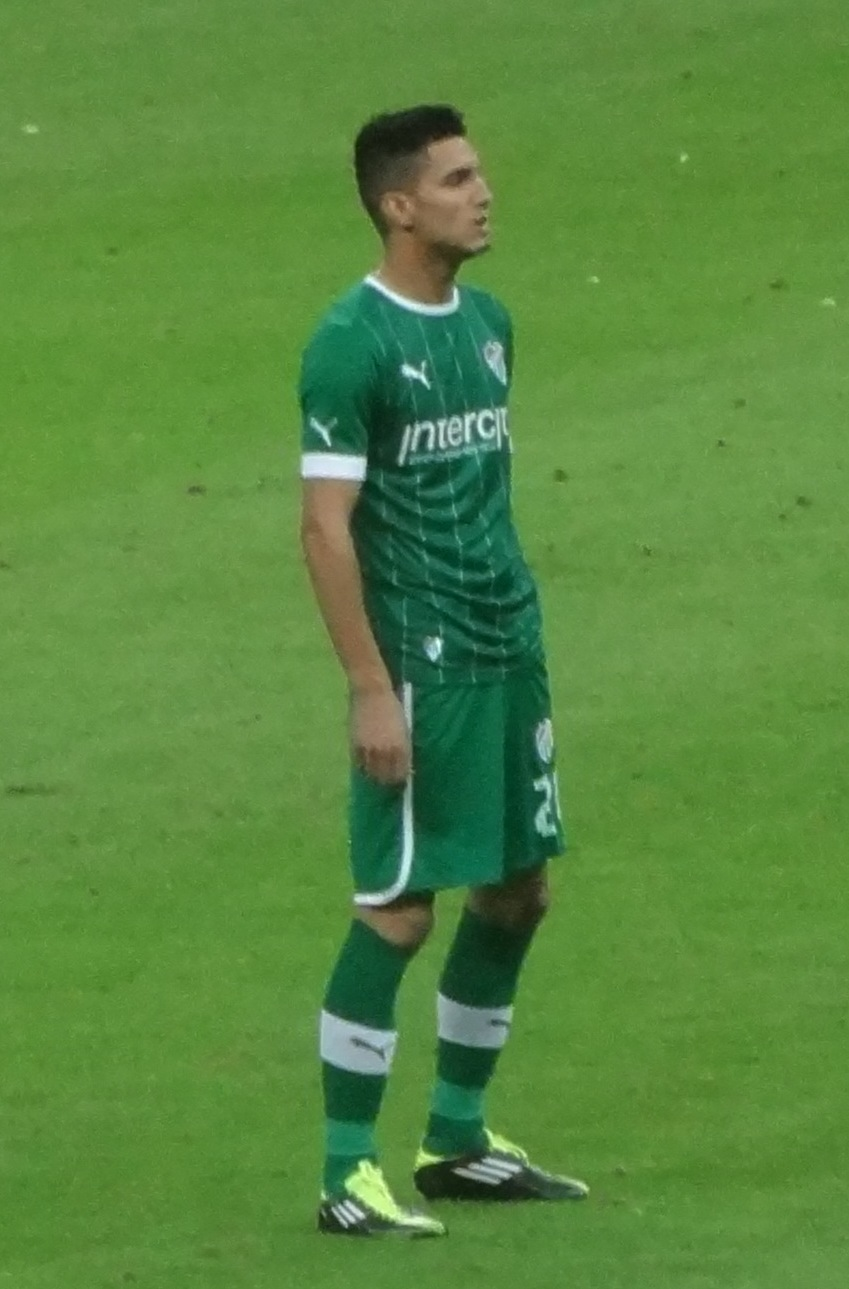
- Chrétien with Bursaspor in 2012

Personal information
- Full name: Michaël Chrétien Basser
- Date of birth: July 10, 1984 (age 42)
- Place of birth: Nancy, France
- Height: 1.79 m (5 ft 10 in)
- Position: Right-back

Youth career
- US Vandoeuvre
- Nancy

Senior career*
Years	Team	Apps	(Gls)
2002–2011	Nancy	258	(9)
2011–2014	Bursaspor	70	(2)
2015	Strasbourg	15	(0)
2015–2018	Nancy	42	(1)
2020	Villers-les-Nancy		

International career^{‡}
2007–2012	Morocco	36	(0)
- * Club domestic league appearances and goals as of 12:48, 5 August 2018 (UTC) ‡ National team caps and goals as of 29 July 2016

Basser Chrétien (Michaël Chrétien: French pronunciation: [mi.ka.ɛl kʁe.tjɛ̃]; Arabic: ميكائيل كريتيان بصير; born 10 July 1984) is a former footballer who played as a right-sided fullback. Born in France, he represented Morocco at international level.

== Career ==
=== AS Nancy ===
Chrétien joined AS Nancy at the age of five. He attended Madine academy in Meuse briefly before he made his league debut in November 2002. He became a contracted player in February 2004.

In November 2006, Chrétien had a penalty saved by FC Basel striker Mladen Petrić after Basel goalkeeper Franco Costanzo was sent off in an UEFA Cup group stage match.

=== Bursaspor ===
On 1 September 2011, Chrétien joined Turkish side Bursaspor on a three-year contract.

== International career ==
A French U21 international, Chrétien earned his first call-up from his father's native Morocco in a friendly against Tunisia on 7 February 2007. He was a member of the Morocco squad that participated in the 2008 African Cup of Nations.

== Honours ==
Nancy

- Coupe de la Ligue: 2005–06
