= Omar Er Rafik =

French footballer (born 1986)

Omar Er Rafik (born 7 January 1986) is a French professional footballer who plays as a striker in the Luxembourg National Division.

== Early life ==
Er Rafik is French-Moroccan. He mainly operated as a midfielder before mainly operating as a striker at the age of seventeen.

== Club career ==
Er Rafik was regarded as one of the most important players in the Luxembourgish top flight during the 2010s. In 2011, he signed for Luxembourgish side FC Differdange 03. He scored 77 goals in his first 120 appearances in the Luxembourgish top flight. In 2017, he signed for Luxembourgish side F91 Dudelange.

== Style of play ==
Er Rafik mainly operates as a striker and is known for his technical ability and composure with the ball.

== Personal life ==
Er Rafik has a son. He is a supporter of French Ligue 1 side PSG.

Er Rafik obtained a master's degree in sports science.
