= 2016 Kuwait Emir Cup final =

2015-16 Kuwait Emir Cup final
Al-Arabi SC	Kuwait SC
1	3
- Date: 10 April 2016
- Venue: Jaber Al-Ahmad International Stadium, Al-Ahmidi
- Attendance: 42,329

The final of 2015–16 Kuwait Emir Cup.

== Details ==
5 April 2014
19:00 (UTC+3)

Al-Arabi SC (Kuwait)	1 – 3	Kuwait SC
Hussain Al-Musawi 60'	Report	Yassine Salhi 3'; Talal Al-Enizi 9'; Yassine Salhi 19'

Jaber International Stadium, Kuwait City
Attendance: 42,604
