= 1998 Qatar Crown Prince Cup =

1998 Crown Prince Cup
Heir Apparent Cup

Tournament details
- Host country: Qatar
- Teams: 4

Final positions
- Champions: Al-Sadd (1st title)

The 1998 Qatar Crown Prince Cup was the 4th edition of this cup tournament in men's football. It was played by the top 4 teams of the Q-League.

Al-Sadd were crowned champions for the first time.

== Results ==
Semi-finals
(Qatar)	Al-Ittihad	1	3	4 (3)
(Qatar)	Al-Arabi	0	4	4 (4)
(Qatar)	Al-Sadd	2	0	2 (3)
(Qatar)	Al-Rayyan	2	0	2 (2)

Final
(Qatar)	Al-Arabi	2
(Qatar)	Al-Sadd	3

1998 Qatar Crown Prince Cup
Winners
Al-Sadd
1st Title
