= Mohammed Mahjoub =

Sudanese footballer (born 1994)

Mohammed Mahjoub محمد محجوب
Personal information
- Full name: Mohammed Mahjoub Hassan Suliman
- Date of birth: 20 January 1994 (age 32)
- Place of birth: Sudan
- Position: Winger

Youth career
- Al-Gharafa

Senior career*
Years	Team	Apps	(Gls)
2014–2015	Al-Rayyan		
2015	→ Al-Shahania (loan)		
2015–2019	Mesaimeer		
2019–2020	Al-Waab		
- * Club domestic league appearances and goals

Mohammed Mahjoub (Arabic:محمد محجوب; born 20 January 1994) is a Sudanese footballer who plays as a winger.

== Career ==
He formerly played for Al-Gharafa, Al-Rayyan, Al-Shahania, Mesaimeer and Al-Waab .
