= Rachid Hamdani =

Moroccan footballer (born 1985)

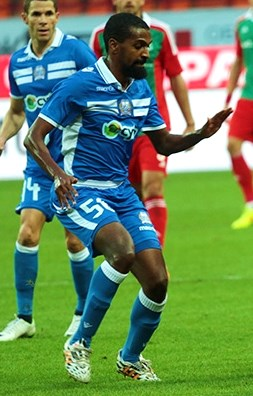

Personal information
- Full name: Rachid Hamdani
- Date of birth: 8 April 1985 (age 41)
- Place of birth: Toul, France
- Height: 1.76 m (5 ft 9 1/2 in)
- Position: Midfielder

Senior career*
Years	Team	Apps	(Gls)
2003–2007	Nancy B	61	(6)
2004–2008	Nancy	2	(0)
2005–2007	→ Raon-l'Étape (loan)	55	(1)
2007–2008	→ Clermont (loan)	30	(3)
2008–2011	Clermont	79	(7)
2011–2015	Apollon Limassol	104	(6)
2015–2017	Asteras Tripolis	47	(0)

International career^{‡}
2008–	Morocco	2	(0)
- * Club domestic league appearances and goals as of 16:56, 1 March 2019 (UTC) ‡ National team caps and goals as of 16:56, 1 March 2019 (UTC)

Rachid Hamdani (Arabic: رشيد حمداني; born 8 April 1985) is a footballer who last played as a midfielder for Asteras Tripolis. Born in France, he represented Morocco at international level.

== Club career ==
Hamdani started his career in France playing mainly with two clubs: Nancy and Clermont, till the summer of 2011.

He joined Apollon Limassol in 2011 where he won the 2012–13 Cypriot Cup. After making fewer appearances with other players like Camel Meriem and Luka Stojanovic being preferred, he scored in his last game for Apollon Limassol in the 2014–15 season.

On 17 June 2015, he signed a two-year contract with Greek Super League side Asteras Tripolis.

== Honours ==
- Ligue 2: 2005
- Coupe de la Ligue: 2006
- Cypriot Cup: 2012–13
