= Adam Farouk =

French footballer (born 1985)

Personal information
- Date of birth: 12 December 1985 (age 40)
- Place of birth: Gaillac, France
- Position: Defender

Senior career*
Years	Team	Apps	(Gls)
- Racing Club de France
2004-2005	RBC	13	(0)
2006-2011	Noisy-le-Sec	53+	(2+)
- * Club domestic league appearances and goals

Adam Farouk (born 12 December 1985) is a French former footballer who is last known to have played as a defender for Noisy-le-Sec.

== Career ==
In 2004, Farouk signed for Dutch top flight side RBC from Racing Club de France in the French fourth division, where he made 13 league appearances and scored 0 goals. However, that October, he suffered a knee injury.

In 2005, he was released by RBC.

In 2006, he signed for French fifth division club Noisy-le-Sec after not playing for 1 year and a half due to injury.
