= Sékou Touré (footballer) =

Ivorian footballer

Personal information
- Date of birth: 1 May 1934
- Place of birth: Bouaké, Ivory Coast
- Date of death: 2 April 2003 (aged 68)
- Position: Striker

Senior career*
| Years | Team | Apps | (Gls) |
| 1954 | ASEC | | |
| 1955–1958 | Africa Sports | | |
| 1958–1959 | Alés | 17 | (8) |
| 1959–1960 | Sochaux | 10 | (2) |
| 1960 | Forbach | 16 | (12) |
| 1961–1962 | Montpellier | 53 | (37) |
| 1962 | Grenoble | 9 | (4) |
| 1963 | Nice | 16 | (6) |
| 1964 | Nîmes | 8 | (1) |
| 1964–1965 | Dieppe | | |
| 1965–1966 | AS Béziers | 32 | (14) |
- * Club domestic league appearances and goals

Sékou Touré (1 May 1934 – 2 April 2003) was an Ivorian professional footballer who played as a striker.

He played in Ivory Coast for ASEC and Africa Sports, before playing in France between 1958 and 1966 for Olympique Alès, Nîmes Olympique, Nice, Sochaux, US Forbach, Grenoble, Dieppe, Montpellier and AS Béziers.

Touré was the Ligue 1 top scorer in the 1961–62 season, scoring 25 goals.

== Death ==
On 2 April 2003, Touré died from an illness aged 69.

== Honours ==
Individual

- Ligue 1 top goalscorer: 1961–62

== Sources ==
- Barreaud, Marc (1998). Dictionnaire des footballeurs étrangers du championnat professionnel francais (1932–1997). Editions L'Harmattan. ISBN 978-2738466082.
- Sékou Touré at National-Football-Teams.com
- Sékou Touré at WorldFootball.net
