= Chakib Benzoukane =

Moroccan footballer

Personal information
- Full name: Chakib Benzoukane
- Date of birth: 7 August 1986 (age 40)
- Place of birth: Marrakesh, Morocco
- Height: 1.83 m (6 ft 0 in)
- Position: Defender

Senior career*
Years	Team	Apps	(Gls)
2005–2007	Kawkab Marrakech	?	(?)
2007–2010	Levski Sofia	34	(0)
2011	MAS Fez	0	(0)
2012	Apollon Limassol	0	(0)
2012–2013	Hatta Club		
2015–2016	Beni Mellal	0	(0)
2016	Kasba Tadla	0	(0)

International career^{‡}
2009–2010	Morocco	4	(0)
- * Club domestic league appearances and goals as of 14:20, 9 January 2011 (UTC) ‡ National team caps and goals as of 01:03, 9 January 2011 (UTC)

Chakib Benzoukane (born 7 August 1986) is a Moroccan footballer who plays as a defender.

== Career ==
He started his career in Kawkab Marrakech.

=== Levski Sofia ===
In the summer of 2007 Benzoukane signed a four-year contract with Levski Sofia in the A PFG. The transfer fee was 500 000 euros. Benzoukane had many injuries during his playing days for Levski. That became the reason he missed the first part of 2008/2009 season. On 8 April 2009, he returned to the squad. He became a Champion of Bulgaria in 2009.

On 17 May 2010, Benzoukane renewed his contract until 30 June 2012. In January 2011 his contract was mutually terminated.

== International ==
In 2005, he got to the semi-finals in the FIFA U-20 World Cup with Morocco U20.

In September 2009, he received his first call-up to the senior team of his country. On 10 October 2009, Benzoukane made his debut for Morocco, playing the full 90 minutes and earning himself a booking in the 1–3 away loss to Gabon in a 2010 FIFA World Cup qualification match. On 10 August 2010, he was once again called up to the national team of Morocco for the debut of the new manager Eric Gerets.

== Honours ==
- A PFG: 2008–09
- Bulgarian Supercup: 2007, 2009
