= Hassan Akesbi =

Moroccan footballer (1934–2024)

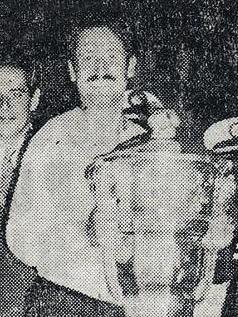
- Akesbi with the Throne Cup in 1967

Personal information
- Date of birth: 5 December 1934
- Place of birth: Tangier, Tangier International Zone, Morocco
- Date of death: 9 November 2024 (aged 89)
- Height: 1.73 m (5 ft 8 in)
- Position: Striker

Youth career
- Sevilliana Tanger

Senior career*
| Years | Team | Apps | (Gls) |
| 1952–1955 | FUS de Rabat | | |
| 1955–1961 | Nîmes | 204 | (119) |
| 1961–1963 | Reims | 78 | (48) |
| 1964 | Monaco | 11 | (6) |
| 1964–1965 | Reims | 23 | (8) |
| 1965–1970 | FUS de Rabat | | |

International career
| 1960–1970 | Morocco | 4 | (3) |

Managerial career
- FUS de Rabat
- Hassania Agadir
- IZK Khemisset
- * Club domestic league appearances and goals

Hassan Akesbi (Arabic: حسن أقصبي; 5 December 1934 – 9 November 2024) was a Moroccan footballer who played as a striker.

== Career ==
Akesbi scored more than 100 goals for French club Nîmes before transferring to Reims in 1961 where he won Ligue 1 in 1962.

At FUS de Rabat he won the Moroccan Throne Cup in 1967.

He retired in 1970 just before Morocco's first World Cup appearance.

In 2006, Akesbi was selected by the Confederation of African Football (CAF) as one of the best 200 African football players of the last 50 years.

== Death ==
Akesbi died on 9 November 2024, at the age of 89.
