= Hassan Hanini =

Moroccan footballer (born 1958)

Personal information
- Date of birth: 21 October 1958 (age 68)
- Place of birth: Bouznika, Morocco

International career
Years	Team	Apps	(Gls)
- Morocco

Hassan Hanini (born 21 October 1958) is a Moroccan footballer. He competed in the men's tournament at the 1984 Summer Olympics.
