= Jamal Alioui =

Moroccan footballer and manager (born 1982)

Personal information
- Full name: Jamal Alioui
- Date of birth: 2 June 1982 (age 44)
- Place of birth: Saint-Étienne, France
- Height: 1.79 m (5 ft 10 in)
- Position: Right-back

Team information
- Current team: Crystal Palace (assistant)

Youth career
- 1999–2001: Lyon

Senior career*
Years	Team	Apps	(Gls)
2001–2003	Lyon B	42	(1)
2003–2005	Perugia	17	(0)
2004	→ Catania (loan)	3	(0)
2005–2006	Crotone	25	(0)
2006	→ Metz (loan)	12	(0)
2007–2010	Sion	88	(1)
2010	Karabükspor	0	(0)
2011	Wydad Casablanca	22	(0)
2011–2012	Al-Kharitiyath	11	(0)
2012–2013	Nantes	0	(0)
2013	Wydad Casablanca	10	(0)
2013–2016	MDA Chasselay		

International career
2003–2012	Morocco	16	(0)

Managerial career
- 2017–2018: Misérieux-Trévoux (assistant)
- 2018–2019: Bron Grand Lyon
- 2019–2020: Vaulx-en-Velin
- 2020–2021: Morocco U20 (assistant)
- 2021–2022: GOAL FC
- 2022: Nancy (assistant)
- 2022–2023: Versailles (assistant)
- 2023: Bourges
- 2024–2026: Lyon (assistant)
- 2026–2026: Crystal Palace (assistant)
- * Club domestic league appearances and goals

Jamal Alioui (Arabic: جمال عليوي; born 2 June 1982) is a professional football coach and former player who is currently the assistant manager of Premier League club Crystal Palace.

As a player, Alioui spent his career in Europe, but did have spells in Asia and Africa with Qatari club Al-Kharitiyath and his country's Wydad Casablanca.

== International career ==
Born in Saint-Étienne, Loire, Alioui chose to play for Morocco because of his Moroccan background and ancestry. He was the captain of the Morocco team at the 2004 Olympic, behind group winners Iraq and runners-up Costa Rica.

== Managerial career ==
Alioui retired at the end of the 2015–16 season due to a recurrent pain in his hip. He began as a coach for the U17 squad of French club Rive Droite. In the summer 2017, Aliuoi was hired as assistant manager for Miserieux Trevoux.

In the summer 2018, he was appointed as manager of Bron Grand Lyon. Ahead of the 2019–20 season, he was appointed manager of FC Vaulx-en-Velin. On 9 January 2020, it was reported, that Alioui would resign to move on for a new challenge. Two days later, Alioui revealed that he had been appointed as assistant coach to João Aroso for Morocco U20 national team.

In June 2021, Aliouli was appointed as head coach of French Championnat National 2 side GOAL FC.

In January 2024, Alioui joined Lyon and was named as the assistant manager to Pierre Sage.

== Honours ==
Perugia

- UEFA Intertoto Cup: 2003

Sion

- Swiss Cup: 2008–09
