= 2015–16 Lille OSC season =

Lille
2015–16 season
- President: Michel Seydoux
- Manager: Frédéric Antonetti
- Stadium: Stade Pierre-Mauroy
- Ligue 1: 5th
- Coupe de France: Round of 32
- Coupe de la Ligue: Runners-up
- Top goalscorer: League: Sofiane Boufal (11); All: Sofiane Boufal (12)
- Highest home attendance: 39,601 vs Paris Saint-Germain (7 August 2015)
- Lowest home attendance: 8,801 vs Laval (15 December 2015)
Home colours	Away colours	Third colours

The 2015–16 season was Lille OSC's 72nd season in existence and the club's 16th consecutive season in the top flight of French football.

== Players ==
=== Current squad ===
As of 2 February 2016.

Note: Flags indicate national team as defined under FIFA eligibility rules; some limited exceptions apply. Players may hold more than one non-FIFA nationality.

No.	Pos.	Nation	Player
1	GK	NGR	Vincent Enyeama
2	DF	FRA	Sébastien Corchia
3	DF	MLI	Youssouf Koné
4	MF	FRA	Florent Balmont
5	DF	ARG	Renato Civelli
6	MF	FRA	Ibrahim Amadou
7	MF	MAR	Sofiane Boufal
8	MF	MAR	Mounir Obbadi
9	FW	FRA	Yassine Benzia
10	MF	FRA	Marvin Martin
11	MF	FRA	Éric Bauthéac
13	DF	ZAM	Stoppila Sunzu (on loan from Shanghai Shenhua)
14	FW	GHA	Yaw Yeboah (on loan from Manchester City)
15	MF	FRA	Lenny Nangis

No.	Pos.	Nation	Player
16	GK	MTQ	Steeve Elana
18	DF	FRA	Franck Béria
19	DF	FRA	Djibril Sidibé
22	FW	CIV	Junior Tallo
23	DF	FRA	Adama Soumaoro
24	MF	FRA	Rio Mavuba (captain)
25	DF	MNE	Marko Baša
27	FW	BEL	Baptiste Guillaume
28	DF	FRA	Benjamin Pavard
30	GK	FRA	Jean Butez
31	MF	FRA	Morgan Amalfitano
32	MF	POR	Rony Lopes (on loan from Monaco)
39	FW	POR	Eder (on loan from Swansea City)
40	GK	FRA	Mike Maignan

=== Out on loan ===
Note: Flags indicate national team as defined under FIFA eligibility rules; some limited exceptions apply. Players may hold more than one non-FIFA nationality.

No.	Pos.	Nation	Player
—	DF	FRA	Julian Jeanvier (on loan to Red Star)
—	MF	POR	Alexis Araujo (on loan to Boulogne)
—	MF	FRA	Souahilo Meïté (on loan to Zulte Waregem)
—	FW	SUI	Michael Frey (on loan to Luzern)

No.	Pos.	Nation	Player
—	FW	FRA	Serhou Guirassy (on loan to Auxerre)
—	FW	CGO	Kévin Koubemba (on loan to Brest)
—	FW	CPV	Ryan Mendes (on loan to Nottingham Forest)
—	FW	FRA	Ronny Rodelin (on loan to Caen)

=== Appearances and goals ===
No.	Pos.	Name	Ligue 1		Coupe de France		Coupe de la Ligue		Total	
No.	Pos.	Name	Apps	Goals	Apps	Goals	Apps	Goals	Apps	Goals
1	GK	(Nigeria) Vincent Enyeama	35	0	0	0	4	0	39	0
16	GK	(France) Steeve Elana	0	0	2	0	0	0	2	0
30	GK	(France) Jean Butez	0	0	0	0	0	0	0	0
40	GK	(France) Mike Maignan	3+1	0	0	0	1	0	5	0
2	DF	(France) Sébastien Corchia	30+3	2	2	0	5	0	40	4
3	DF	(Mali) Youssouf Koné	0+1	0	1	0	0	0	2	0
5	DF	(Argentina) Renato Civelli	32	0	1	0	3	0	36	0
13	DF	(Zambia) Stoppila Sunzu	10+2	1	1	0	3	1	16	2
18	DF	(France) Franck Béria	1+1	0	0	0	1	0	3	0
19	DF	(France) Djibril Sidibé	36+1	4	1+1	0	4	2	43	6
23	DF	(Ivory Coast) Adama Soumaoro	25+3	1	1	0	2	1	31	2
25	DF	(Montenegro) Marko Baša	15	0	1	0	1	0	17	0
28	DF	(France) Benjamin Pavard	6+7	0	1	0	2+1	0	17	0
4	MF	(France) Florent Balmont	25+3	0	0	0	3	0	31	0
6	MF	(France) Ibrahim Amadou	17+5	1	1+1	0	5	0	29	1
7	MF	(Morocco) Sofiane Boufal	27+2	11	1	0	4+1	1	35	12
8	MF	(Morocco) Mounir Obbadi	25+5	1	1+1	0	2+1	0	35	1
10	MF	(France) Marvin Martin	4+8	0	2	0	1	0	15	0
11	MF	(France) Éric Bauthéac	25+3	2	1+1	0	2+2	1	34	3
14	MF	(Ghana) Yaw Yeboah	1+2	0	0+1	0	0+1	0	5	0
17	MF	(France) Souahilo Meïté	0+3	0	0	0	1	0	4	0
24	MF	(France) Rio Mavuba	31+4	0	0	0	1+1	0	37	0
26	MF	(Portugal) Alexis Araujo	0+1	0	0	0	0+1	0	2	0
31	MF	(France) Morgan Amalfitano	10+5	2	1	0	1	0	17	2
32	MF	(Portugal) Rony Lopes	5+7	2	1	1	2+1	0	16	3
9	FW	(France) Yassine Benzia	17+8	5	1	0	2+1	1	29	6
12	FW	(France) Serhou Guirassy	3+5	0	0	0	1	1	9	1
15	FW	(France) Lenny Nangis	3+8	0	0+1	0	2	0	14	0
22	FW	(Ivory Coast) Junior Tallo	11+12	0	1	1	1+2	0	27	1
27	FW	(Belgium) Baptiste Guillaume	5+5	0	1	0	0+1	0	12	0
29	FW	(Switzerland) Michael Frey	0	0	0	0	0	0	0	0
39	FW	(Portugal) Eder	12+1	6	0	0	0+1	0	14	6

Last updated: 14 May 2016
Source: Match reports in Competitive matches, Ligue1.com

=== Goalscorers ===
Ran	No.	Pos	Nat	Name	Ligue 1	Coupe de France	Coupe de la Ligue	Total
1	7	MF	(Morocco)	Sofiane Boufal	11	0	1	12
2	9	FW	(France)	Yassine Benzia	5	0	1	6
3	19	DF	(France)	Djibril Sidibé	4	0	2	6
3	39	FW	(Portugal)	Eder	6	0	0	6
4	11	MF	(France)	Éric Bauthéac	2	0	1	3
4	32	MF	(Portugal)	Rony Lopes	2	1	0	3
5	2	DF	(France)	Sébastien Corchia	2	0	0	2
5	23	DF	(France)	Adama Soumaoro	1	0	1	2
5	13	DF	(Zambia)	Stoppila Sunzu	1	0	1	2
5	31	MF	(France)	Morgan Amalfitano	2	0	0	2
6	12	FW	(France)	Serhou Guirassy	0	0	1	1
6	22	FW	(Ivory Coast)	Junior Tallo	0	1	0	1
6	6	MF	(France)	Ibrahim Amadou	1	0	0	1
6	8	MF	(Morocco)	Mounir Obbadi	1	0	0	1
				Own goals	1	0	1	2
Total					39	2	9	50

Last updated: 14 May 2016
Source: Match reports in Competitive matches

=== Disciplinary record ===
N	P	Nat.	Name	Ligue 1			Coupe de France			Coupe de la Ligue			Total			Notes
N	P	Nat.	Name	Yellow card	Second yellow card	Red card	Yellow card	Second yellow card	Red card	Yellow card	Second yellow card	Red card	Yellow card	Second yellow card	Red card	Notes
19	DF	(France)	Djibril Sidibé	3			1						4			
7	MF	(Morocco)	Sofiane Boufal	9	1	1							9	1	1	
28	DF	(France)	Benjamin Pavard	3			1						4			
2	DF	(France)	Sébastien Corchia	6						1			7			
5	DF	(Argentina)	Renato Civelli	6		2				1			7		2	
8	MF	(Morocco)	Mounir Obbadi	8			1			1			10			
33	FW	(Ivory Coast)	Junior Tallo	2						1			3			
11	DF	(France)	Éric Bauthéac	7						1			8			
4	MF	(France)	Florent Balmont	5						1			6			
25	DF	(Montenegro)	Marko Baša	1									1			
24	MF	(France)	Rio Mavuba	5									5			
1	GK	(Nigeria)	Vincent Enyeama	3		1							3		1	
13	DF	(Zambia)	Stoppila Sunzu		1					1			1	1		
23	DF	(France)	Adama Soumaoro	6									6			
27	FW	(Belgium)	Baptiste Guillaume	1									1			
19	FW	(France)	Serhou Guirassy	2									2			
9	FW	(France)	Yassine Benzia	4									4			
15	FW	(France)	Lenny Nangis	2						1			3			
14	FW	(Ghana)	Yaw Yeboah							1			1			
10	MF	(France)	Marvin Martin	1						1			2			
6	MF	(France)	Ibrahim Amadou	2						2			4			
32	MF	(Portugal)	Rony Lopes	1			1						2			
31	MF	(France)	Morgan Amalfitano	2									2			
39	FW	(Portugal)	Eder	1									1			

Last updated: 14 May 2016
Source: Match reports in Competitive matches
Only competitive matches
(yellow card) = Number of bookings; (second yellow card) = Number of sending offs after a second yellow card; (red card) = Number of sending offs by a direct red card.

== Transfers ==
=== Transfers in ===
Date	Pos.	Player	Age	Moved from	Fee	Notes
1 July 2015	DF	(Argentina) Renato Civelli	31	(Turkey) Bursaspor	Free transfer	
1 July 2015	MF	(France) Éric Bauthéac	27	(France) Nice	Undisclosed	
2 July 2015	FW	(France) Serhou Guirassy	19	(France) Stade Laval	£350,000	
10 July 2015	MF	(Morocco) Mounir Obbadi	32	(France) Monaco	Free Transfer	
15 July 2015	FW	(Ivory Coast) Junior Tallo	22	(Italy) Roma	Undisclosed	
16 July 2015	DF	(Cameroon) Ibrahim Amadou	22	(France) Nancy	£1,400,000	
18 July 2015	FW	(Belgium) Baptiste Guillaume	20	(France) Lens	£2,800,000	
18 August 2015	GK	(France) Mike Maignan	19	(France) Paris Saint-Germain	Undisclosed	
31 August 2015	MF	(France) Lenny Nangis	21	(France) Caen	Undisclosed	
8 January 2016	MF	(France) Morgan Amalfitano	30	(England) West Ham United	Free Transfer	

=== Loans in ===
Date	Pos.	Player	Age	Loaned from	Return date	Notes
28 July 2015	DF	(Zambia) Stoppila Sunzu	26	(China) Shanghai Shenhua	30 June 2016	
14 August 2015	MF	(Ghana) Yaw Yeboah	18	(England) Manchester City	30 June 2016	
27 August 2015	FW	(Ivory Coast) Adriel Ba Loua	19	(Ivory Coast) ASEC Mimosas	30 June 2016	
6 January 2016	MF	(Portugal) Rony Lopes	20	(France) Monaco	30 June 2016	
1 February 2016	FW	(Portugal) Eder	28	(Wales) Swansea City	30 June 2016	

=== Transfers out ===
Date	Pos.	Player	Age	Moved to	Fee	Notes
1 July 2015	DF	(Czech Republic) David Rozehnal	34	(Belgium) Oostende	Free Transfer	
1 July 2015	DF	(Denmark) Simon Kjær	26	(Turkey) Fenerbahçe	Undisclosed	
1 July 2015	MF	(Mali) Abdoulay Diaby	24	(Belgium) Club Brugge	Undisclosed	
3 July 2015	MF	(France) Jonathan Delaplace	29	(France) Caen	Undisclosed	
10 July 2015	MF	(Mali) Adama Traoré	20	(France) Monaco	£9,800,000	
10 July 2015	MF	(Senegal) Idrissa Gueye	25	(England) Aston Villa	€10,000,000	
21 July 2015	FW	(France) Nolan Roux	27	(France) Saint-Étienne	Undisclosed	
20 August 2015	FW	(Costa Rica) John Jairo Ruiz	21	(Ukraine) Dnipro Dnipropetrovsk	Undisclosed	

=== Loans out ===
Date	Pos.	Player	Age	Loaned to	Return date	Notes
17 July 2015	FW	(Republic of the Congo) Kévin Koubemba	22	(France) Brest	30 June 2016	
31 August 2015	DF	(France) Julian Jeanvier	23	(France) Red Star	30 June 2016	
31 August 2015	FW	(Cape Verde) Ryan Mendes	25	(England) Nottingham Forest	30 June 2016	
31 August 2015	FW	(France) Ronny Rodelin	25	(France) Caen	30 June 2016	
20 January 2016	FW	(France) Serhou Guirassy	19	(France) Auxerre	30 June 2016	
21 January 2016	FW	(Portugal) Alexis Araujo	19	(France) Boulogne	30 June 2016	
27 January 2016	FW	(Switzerland) Michael Frey	21	(Switzerland) Luzern	30 June 2016	
1 February 2016	MF	(France) Souahilo Meïté	21	(Belgium) Zulte Waregem	30 June 2016	

== Pre-season and friendlies ==
11 July 2015 Friendly	Boulogne	1–2	Lille	Boulogne-sur-Mer
18:00	Allart 90+3'	Report	Araujo 23'; Bauthéac 44'	Stadium: Stade de la Libération; Attendance: 3,000

15 July 2015 Friendly	Lokeren	4–1	Lille	Lokeren, Belgium
19:00	Dessers 32'; Marić 59' (pen.); Ansah 79'; Patosi 84'	Report	Boufal 61' (pen.)	Stadium: Daknamstadion

18 July 2015 Friendly	Oostende	0–1	Lille	Ostend, Belgium
16:00		Report	Rodelin 36'	Stadium: Albertpark; Attendance: 2,000

22 July 2015 Friendly	Lille	1–0	Troyes	Cambrai
18:30	Guillaume 78'			Stadium: Stade de la Liberté; Attendance: 1,000

25 July 2015 Friendly	Beşiktaş	0–0	Lille	Gleisdorf, Austria
18:00				Stadium: Gleisdorf stadion Attendance: 1,000

1 August 2015 Friendly	Braga	1–1	Lille	Braga, Portugal
21:00	Pinho 54'	Report	Boufal 69'	Stadium: Estádio Municipal de Braga

== Competitions ==
=== Ligue 1 ===
==== League table ====
Pos	Team	Pld	W	D	L	GF	GA	GD	Pts	Qualification or relegation
3	Monaco	38	17	14	7	57	50	+7	65	Qualification for the Champions League third qualifying round
4	Nice	38	18	9	11	58	41	+17	63	Qualification for the Europa League group stage (Note: Since the winners of the 2015–16 Coupe de France and the 2015–16 Coupe de la Ligue, Paris Saint-Germain, qualified for European competition based on their league position, the spot awarded to the Coupe de France winners (Europa League group stage) was passed to the fourth-placed team and the spot awarded to the Coupe de la Ligue winners (Europa League third qualifying round) was passed to the sixth-placed team. The fifth-placed team received the spot in Europa League third qualifying round originally designated to the fourth-placed team.)
5	Lille	38	15	15	8	39	27	+12	60	Qualification for the Europa League third qualifying round
6	Saint-Étienne	38	17	7	14	42	37	+5	58	Qualification for the Europa League third qualifying round
7	Caen	38	16	6	16	39	52	−13	54	

Source: Ligue 1, Soccerway
Rules for classification: 1) Points; 2) Goal difference; 3) Goals scored; 4) Head-to-head points; 5) Head-to-head goal difference; 6) Fairplay ranking.

==== Results summary ====
Overall								Home						Away					
Pld	W	D	L	GF	GA	GD	Pts	W	D	L	GF	GA	GD	W	D	L	GF	GA	GD
38	15	15	8	39	27	+12	60	9	6	4	21	11	+10	6	9	4	18	16	+2

Last updated: 15 May 2016.
Source: Competitive matches

==== Results by round ====
Round	1	2	3	4	5	6	7	8	9	10	11	12	13	14	15	16	17	18	19	20	21	22	23	24	25	26	27	28	29	30	31	32	33	34	35	36	37	38
Ground	H	A	H	H	A	A	H	A	H	A	H	A	H	A	A	H	A	H	A	H	A	H	A	H	H	A	H	A	H	A	H	A	H	A	H	A	H	A
Result	L	D	D	W	D	D	L	L	W	D	L	D	D	D	L	W	W	W	D	D	L	L	D	W	D	D	W	L	W	W	W	W	W	W	D	W	D	W
Position	18	16	16	12	13	14	14	16	13	13	15	16	16	17	18	18	13	11	11	13	14	14	15	14	15	13	12	15	14	9	9	7	7	6	6	6	6	5

Source: Ligue1
A = Away; H = Home; W = Win; D = Draw; L = Loss

==== Matches ====
7 August 2015 1	Lille	0–1	Paris Saint-Germain	Villeneuve d'Ascq
20:30 CEST (UTC+02:00)	Sidibé (yellow card) 49'; Boufal (yellow card) 83'; Pavard (yellow card) 87'	Report	Rabiot (yellow card) 23' (yellow-red card) 28'; Motta (yellow card) 55'; Lucas 57'; Aurier (yellow card) 60'	Stadium: Stade Pierre-Mauroy; Attendance: 39,601; Referee: Fredy Fautrel

14 August 2015 2	Monaco	0–0	Lille	Fontvieille
20:30 CEST (UTC+2)	Silva (yellow card) 42'	Report	Corchia (yellow card) 24'; Civelli (yellow card) 44'; Obbadi (yellow card) 60'; Boufal (yellow card) 75'; Tallo (yellow card) 79'	Stadium: Stade Louis II; Attendance: 13,284; Referee: Benoît Millot

23 August 2015 3	Lille	0–0	Bordeaux	Villeneuve d'Ascq
14:00 CEST (UTC+02:00)	Bauthéac (yellow card) 52'	Report	Poundjé (yellow card) 30'; Touré (yellow card) 40'; Pallois (yellow card) 60'; Yamberé (yellow card) 63'; Chantôme (yellow card) 78'	Stadium: Stade Pierre-Mauroy; Attendance: 28,035; Referee: Lionel Jaffredo

29 August 2015 4	Lille	1–0	Gazélec Ajaccio	Villeneuve d'Ascq
20:00 CEST (UTC+02:00)	Boufal 23', (yellow card) 81'	Report	Sylla (yellow card) 36'; Mangane (yellow card) 45+1'; Filippi (yellow card) 52'	Stadium: Stade Pierre-Mauroy; Attendance: 27,138; Referee: Mikael Lesage

12 September 2015 5	Lyon	0–0	Lille	Lyon
17:00 CEST (UTC+02:00)	Valbuena (yellow card) 90'	Report	Balmont (yellow card) 26'; Civelli (yellow card) 38'; Corchia (yellow card) 68'; Tallo (yellow card) 90+2'	Stadium: Stade de Gerland; Attendance: 32,137; Referee: Franck Schneider

18 September 2015 6	Rennes	1–1	Lille	Rennes
20:30 CEST (UTC+02:00)	Mendes (yellow card) 51'; Ntep 74'; Armand (yellow card) 79'; Sio (yellow card) 90+5'	Report	Boufal (yellow card) 45', (goal) 49'; Baša (yellow card) 52'; Mavuba (yellow card) 69'; Enyeama (red card) 69'; Bauthéac (yellow card) 90+5'	Stadium: Roazhon Park; Attendance: 27,391; Referee: Stéphane Jochem

25 September 2015 8	Reims	1–0	Lille	Reims
20:30 CEST (UTC+02:00)	Weber (yellow card) 12'; Bulot (yellow card) 15'; Kankava (yellow card) 31'; Ngog 56'	Report	Sidibé (yellow card) 19'; Bauthéac (yellow card) 33'; Mavuba (yellow card) 39'	Stadium: Stade Auguste Delaune; Attendance: 11,696; Referee: Ruddy Buquet

29 September 2015 7	Lille	0–1	Nantes	Villeneuve d'Ascq
18:30 CEST (UTC+02:00)		Report	Iloki 5'; Thomasson (yellow card) 31'; Cana (yellow card) 50'; Déaux (yellow card) 71'	Stadium: Stade Pierre-Mauroy; Attendance: 27,667; Referee: Jérôme Miguelgorry

2 October 2015 9	Lille	2–0	Montpellier	Villeneuve d'Ascq
20:30 CEST (UTC+02:00)	Boufal 43' (pen.); Mavuba (yellow card) 48'; Obbadi (yellow card) 51'; Sidibé 64'; Corchia (yellow card) 72'	Report	Dabo (yellow card) 58'	Stadium: Stade Pierre-Mauroy; Attendance: 30,895; Referee: Saïd Ennjimi

17 October 2015 10	Guingamp	1–1	Lille	Guingamp
20:00 CEST (UTC+02:00)	Diallo (yellow card) 4'; Briand 33'	Report	Sunzu (yellow card) 11' (yellow-red card) 89'; Boufal 30', (yellow card) 65'; Soumaoro (yellow card) 44'; Guillaume (yellow card) 66'	Stadium: Stade du Roudourou; Attendance: 13,084; Referee: Hakim Ben El Hadj

25 October 2015 11	Lille	1–2	Marseille	Villeneuve d'Ascq
17:30 CET (UTC+01:00)	Civelli (yellow card) 18'; Corchia 71', (yellow card) 83'; Guirassy (yellow card) 81'	Report	Batshuayi 37'; Cabella (yellow card) 48'; Nkoulou (yellow card) 52'; Alessandrini 56'; Silva (yellow card) 70'; Diarra (yellow card) 85'	Stadium: Stade Pierre-Mauroy; Attendance: 35,623; Referee: Tony Chapron

1 November 2015 12	Nice	0–0	Lille	Nice
14:00 CET (UTC+01:00)	Ricardo (yellow card) 11'; Koziello (yellow card) 33'; Honorat (yellow card) 85'	Report	Bauthéac (yellow card) 33'; Soumaoro (yellow card) 41'; Obbadi (yellow card) 63'	Stadium: Allianz Riviera; Attendance: 18,169; Referee: Wilfried Bien

7 November 2015 13	Lille	1–1	Bastia	Villeneuve d'Ascq
20:00 CET (UTC+01:00)	Guirassy (yellow card) 37'; Boufal (red card) 82'; Sidibé 87'	Report	Cioni (yellow card) 27'; Danic (yellow card) 40', (goal) 73'; Palmieri (yellow card) 62'	Stadium: Stade Pierre-Mauroy; Attendance: 30,852; Referee: Mikael Lesage

21 November 2015 14	Troyes	1–1	Lille	Troyes
20:00 CET (UTC+01:00)	Darbion (yellow card) 8'; Ayasse (yellow card) 17'; Jean 69'	Report	Benzia 9', (yellow card) 27'	Stadium: Stade de l'Aube; Attendance: 10,407; Referee: Lionel Jaffredo

28 November 2015 15	Angers	2–0	Lille	Angers
20:00 CET (UTC+01:00)	Sunu 20'; Traoré 25'; Camara (yellow card) 60'; Auriac (yellow card) 78'	Report	Corchia (yellow card) 19'; Nangis (yellow card) 27'; Balmont (yellow card) 49'; Civelli (red card) 68'	Stadium: Stade Jean-Bouin; Attendance: 12,000; Referee: Johan Hamel

2 December 2015 16	Lille	1–0	Saint-Étienne	Villeneuve d'Ascq
21:00 CET (UTC+01:00)	Soumaoro (yellow card) 45+1'; Benzia 60'; Balmont (yellow card) 86'	Report	Assou-Ekotto (yellow card) 65'; Hamouma (yellow card) 67'	Stadium: Stade Pierre-Mauroy; Attendance: 29,103; Referee: Frank Schneider

5 December 2015 17	Caen	1–2	Lille	Caen
20:00 CET (UTC+01:00)	Yahia (yellow card) 31'; Delort 70' (pen.); Delaplace (yellow card) 78'	Report	Benzia 28', 56', (yellow card) 62'; Boufal (yellow card) 62'; Enyeama (yellow card) 86'	Stadium: Stade Michel d'Ornano; Attendance: 15,952; Referee: Saïd Ennjimi

12 December 2015 18	Lille	3–0	Lorient	Villeneuve d'Ascq
20:00 CET (UTC+01:00)	Bauthéac 28', 55'; Balmont (yellow card) 33'; Benzia (yellow card) 38'; Sidibé 84'	Report	Gassama (yellow card) 45+1'; N'Dong (yellow card) 61'	Stadium: Stade Pierre-Mauroy; Attendance: 28,170; Referee: Jerome Miguelgorry

19 December 2015 19	Toulouse	1–1	Lille	Toulouse
20:00 CET (UTC+01:00)	Ben Yedder 12'; Machach 43'; Akpa Akpro 60'; Doumbia (yellow card) 64' (yellow-red card) 68'	Report	Obbadi (yellow card) 45+2'; Boufal 87'	Stadium: Stadium Municipal; Attendance: 14,843; Referee: Ruddy Buquet

10 January 2016 20	Lille	1–1	Nice	Villeneuve d'Ascq
17:00 CET (UTC+01:00)	Benzia 11'; Corchia (yellow card) 68'; Pavard (yellow card) 90'	Report	Hult 45'; Mendy (yellow card) 50'; Mallmann (yellow card) 62'; Seri (yellow card) 72'	Stadium: Stade Pierre-Mauroy; Attendance: 30,238; Referee: Hakim Ben El Hadj

16 January 2016 21	Bordeaux	1–0	Lille	Bordeaux
20:00 CET (UTC+01:00)	Poko (yellow card) 48'; Diabaté 51'; Chantôme (yellow card) 58'	Report	Mavuba (yellow card) 84'	Stadium: Nouveau Stade de Bordeaux; Attendance: 21,207; Referee: Lionel Jaffredo

23 January 2016 22	Lille	1–3	Troyes	Villeneuve d'Ascq
20:00 CET (UTC+01:00)	Boufal 25' (pen.), (yellow card) 43'; Bauthéac (yellow card) 35'	Report	Camus (yellow card) 25'; Cabot 77', 80'; Pi 86'	Stadium: Stade Pierre-Mauroy; Attendance: 26,431; Referee: Nicolas Rainville

29 January 2016 23	Marseille	1–1	Lille	Marseille
20:30 CET (UTC+01:00)	Nkoulou (yellow card) 49'; Barrada (red card) 83'; Rabillard 90+6'	Report	Corchia 57'; Amalfitano (yellow card) 90+5'	Stadium: Stade Vélodrome; Attendance: 40,187; Referee: Benoît Bastien

3 February 2016 24	Lille	1–0	Caen	Villeneuve d'Ascq
19:00 CET (UTC+01:00)	Soumaoro 59'	Report	Nkololo (yellow card) 58' (yellow-red card) 85'; Delort (yellow card) 65'	Stadium: Stade Pierre-Mauroy; Attendance: 27,312; Referee: Stéphane Jochem

7 February 2016 25	Lille	1–1	Rennes	Villeneuve d'Ascq
14:00 CET (UTC+01:00)	Eder 42'; Boufal (yellow card) 66' (yellow-red card) 71'; Soumaoro (yellow card) 87'	Report	Danzé (yellow card) 18'; Mendes (yellow card) 23'; M'Bengue (yellow card) 76'; Zeffane (yellow card) 85'; Dembélé 89' (pen.)	Stadium: Stade Pierre-Mauroy; Attendance: 29,012; Referee: Johan Hamel

13 February 2016 26	Paris Saint-Germain	0–0	Lille	Paris
17:00 CET (UTC+01:00)	Pastore (yellow card) 28'; Lucas (yellow card) 68'	Report	Civelli (yellow card) 68'; Martin (yellow card) 76'; Enyeama (yellow card) 87'	Stadium: Parc des Princes; Attendance: 45,391; Referee: Frank Schneider

21 February 2016 27	Lille	1–0	Lyon	Villeneuve d'Ascq
21:00 CET (UTC+01:00)	Boufal 28'; Mavuba (yellow card) 29'; Soumaoro (yellow card) 43'; Amadou (yellow card) 63'; Bauthéac (yellow card) 66'; Enyeama (yellow card) 90'	Report	Grenier (yellow card) 29' (yellow-red card) 87'; Jallet (yellow card) 40' (yellow-red card) 60'; Ferri (yellow card) 61'; Valbuena (yellow card) 71'; Yanga-Mbiwa (yellow card) 75'	Stadium: Stade Pierre-Mauroy; Attendance: 32,956; Referee: Benoît Bastien

27 February 2016 28	Montpellier	3–0	Lille	Montpellier
17:00 CET (UTC+01:00)	Ninga (yellow card) 33'; Bérigaud 52'; Dabo 60'; Skhiri 86'	Report	Pavard (yellow card) 59'; Bauthéac (yellow card) 66'; Boufal (yellow card) 74'	Stadium: Stade de la Mosson; Attendance: 9,576; Referee: Hakim Bel El Hajd

5 March 2016 29	Lille	2–0	Reims	Villeneuve-d'Ascq
20:00 CET (UTC+1)	Lopes (yellow card) 42', (goal) 63'; Sidibé (yellow card) 42'; Eder 90+3'	Report	Rigonato (yellow card) 6'; De Préville (yellow card) 71'; Devaux (yellow card) 74' (yellow-red card) 85'	Stadium: Stade Pierre-Mauroy; Attendance: 27,904; Referee: Mikael Lesage

12 March 2016 30	Bastia	1–2	Lille	Furiani
20:00 CET (UTC+1)	Mostefa (yellow card) 8'; Squillaci (yellow card) 64'; Danic 90+2'	Report	Boufal (yellow card) 36', (goal) 37'; Obbadi (yellow card) 45'; Soumaoro (yellow card) 50'; Amadou 59'	Stadium: Stade Armand Cesari; Attendance: 10,727; Referee: Saïd Ennjimi

19 March 2016 31	Lille	1–0	Toulouse	Villeneuve-d'Ascq
20:00 CET (UTC+1)	Amalfitano 17'; Eder (yellow card) 40'; Civelli (yellow card) 43'; Boufal (yellow card) 90+3'	Report	Diop (yellow card) 54'; Doumbia (yellow card) 57'; Yago (yellow card) 68'	Stadium: Stade Pierre-Mauroy; Attendance: 29,736; Referee: Bartolomeu Varela

3 April 2016 32	Nantes	0–3	Lille	Nantes
14:00 CEST (UTC+2)	Gomis (yellow card) 61'; Sabaly (yellow card) 81'	Report	Eder 19', 90+2'; Sunzu 58'; Civelli (yellow card) 83'	Stadium: Stade de la Beaujoire; Attendance: 25,518; Referee: Tony Chapron

10 April 2016 33	Lille	4–1	Monaco	Villeneuve-d'Ascq
14:00 CEST (UTC+2)	Obbadi (yellow card) 32', (goal) 77'; Amalfitano 37'; Civelli (red card) 55'; Eder 67'; Sidibé 88'	Report	Raggi (yellow card) 43'; Fabinho (yellow card) 44'; Echiéjilé (red card) 64'; Bahlouli 90+2'	Stadium: Stade Pierre-Mauroy; Attendance: 32,125; Referee: Sébastien Moreira

15 April 2016 34	Gazélec Ajaccio	2–4	Lille	Ajaccio
20:00 CEST (UTC+2)	Pujol 41'; Lemoigne (yellow card) 45'; Mangane (yellow card) 45+1'; Filippi (yellow card) 50' (yellow-red card) 67'	Report	Boufal 19', 74', 84'; Benzia (yellow card) 45+1'; Balmont (yellow card) 62'; Martinez 88' (o.g.)	Stadium: Stade Ange Casanova; Attendance: 3,605; Referee: François Letexier

27 April 2016 35	Lille	0–0	Angers	Villeneuve-d'Ascq
18:30 CEST (UTC+2)	Obbadi (yellow card) 64'	Report	Thomas (yellow card) 61'; Capelle (yellow card) 71'; Bouka Moutou (yellow card) 80'; Letellier (yellow card) 87'	Stadium: Stade Pierre-Mauroy; Attendance: 32,001; Referee: Johan Hamel

30 April 2016 36	Lorient	0–1	Lille	Lorient
20:00 CEST (UTC+2)	Gassama (yellow card) 71'	Report	Lopes 56'; Obbadi (yellow card) 65'; Amalfitano (yellow card) 90'	Stadium: Stade du Moustoir; Attendance: 11,501; Referee: Benoît Bastien

7 May 2016 37	Lille	0–0	Guingamp	Villeneuve-d'Ascq
20:00 CEST (UTC+2)	Amadou (yellow card) 45'	Report	Sankharé (yellow card) 26'; Briand (yellow card) 42'; Coco (yellow card) 79'; Blas (yellow card) 90+3'	Stadium: Stade Pierre-Mauroy; Attendance: 30,298; Referee: Amaury Delerue

14 May 2016 38	Saint-Étienne	0–1	Lille	Saint-Étienne
21:00 CEST (UTC+2)	Roux (yellow card) 42'; Ruffier (yellow card) 90+4'	Report	Eder 41' (pen.); Nangis (yellow card) 83'	Stadium: Stade Geoffroy-Guichard; Attendance: 39,550; Referee: Clément Turpin

=== Coupe de France ===
3 January 2016 Round of 64	Amiens	0–1	Lille	Amiens
14:00 CET (UTC+01:00)	Zobiri (yellow card) 70'	Report	Sidibé (yellow card) 33'; Tallo 41' (pen.); Obaddi (yellow card) 53'; Pavard (yellow card) 64'	Stadium: Stade de la Licorne; Attendance: 6,125; Referee: Fredy Fautrel

20 January 2016 Round of 32	Trélissac	1–1 (a.e.t.) (4–2 p)	Lille	Périgueux
15:30 CET (UTC+01:00)	Eglin (yellow card) 43'; Keyta 56'; Sophie (yellow card) 70'; Papin (yellow card) 106'	Report	Lopes 13', (yellow card) 102'	Stadium: Stade Francis-Rongiéras; Referee: Bartolomeu Varela
	Penalties
	Cavaniol (penalty missed); Papin (penalty scored); Burgho (penalty scored); Gnaleko (penalty scored); Desenclos (penalty scored)		(penalty missed) Benzia; (penalty missed) Lopes; (penalty scored) Civelli; (penalty scored) Sidibé

=== Coupe de la Ligue ===
28 October 2015 Round of 32	Lille	2–1	Troyes	Villeneuve d'Ascq
21:00 CET (UTC+01:00)	Sunzu 49'; Guirassy 57'; Nangis (yellow card) 72'; Yeboah (yellow card) 74'; Corchia (yellow card) 79'	Report	Perea 29'; Othon (yellow card) 33'; Thiago Xavier (yellow card) 36'	Stadium: Stade Pierre-Mauroy; Attendance: 9,886; Referee: Benoît Bastien

15 December 2015 Round of 16	Lille	1–0	Laval	Villeneuve d'Ascq
20:00 CET (UTC+01:00)	Martin (yellow card) 24'; Amadou (yellow card) 48'; Civelli (yellow card) 55'; Sidibé 79'	Report	Gonçalves (yellow card) 10'; Perrot (yellow card) 14'; Alioui (yellow card) 17'	Stadium: Stade Pierre-Mauroy; Attendance: 8,801; Referee: Bartolomeu Varela

13 January 2016 Quarter-finals	Guingamp	0–0 (a.e.t.) (2–4 p)	Lille	Guingamp
20:00 CET (UTC+01:00)	Lévêque (yellow card) 65'; Coco (yellow card) 82'; Salibur (yellow card) 72'	Report	Sunzu (yellow card) 75'; Bauthéac (yellow card) 82'; Tallo (yellow card) 84'; Balmont (yellow card) 90+3'	Stadium: Stade du Roudourou; Attendance: 11,326; Referee: Tony Chapron
	Penalties
	Giresse (penalty scored); Benezet (penalty missed); Erdinç (penalty scored); Lévêque (penalty missed)		(penalty scored) Boufal; (penalty scored) Sidibé; (penalty scored) Tallo; (penalty missed) Mavuba; (penalty scored) Bauthéac

26 January 2016 Semi-finals	Lille	5–1	Bordeaux	Villeneuve d'Ascq
21:00 CET (UTC+01:00)	Benzia 7'; Sané 41' (o.g.); Soumaoro 45'; Obbadi (yellow card) 45+1'; Bautheac 56'; Boufal 90+3'	Report	Chantôme 33'; Khazri (yellow card) 44'; Sané (yellow card) 51'	Stadium: Stade Pierre-Mauroy; Attendance: 19,168; Referee: Clément Turpin

23 April 2016 Final	Paris Saint-Germain	2–1	Lille	Saint-Denis
21:00 CEST (UTC+02:00)	Aurier (yellow card) 19'; Pastore 40'; Rabiot (yellow card) 48' (yellow-red card) 70'; Di María 74'	Report	Sidibé 49'; Amadou (yellow card) 70'	Stadium: Stade de France; Attendance: 68,640; Referee: Ruddy Buquet
