= 2016 Coupe de la Ligue final =

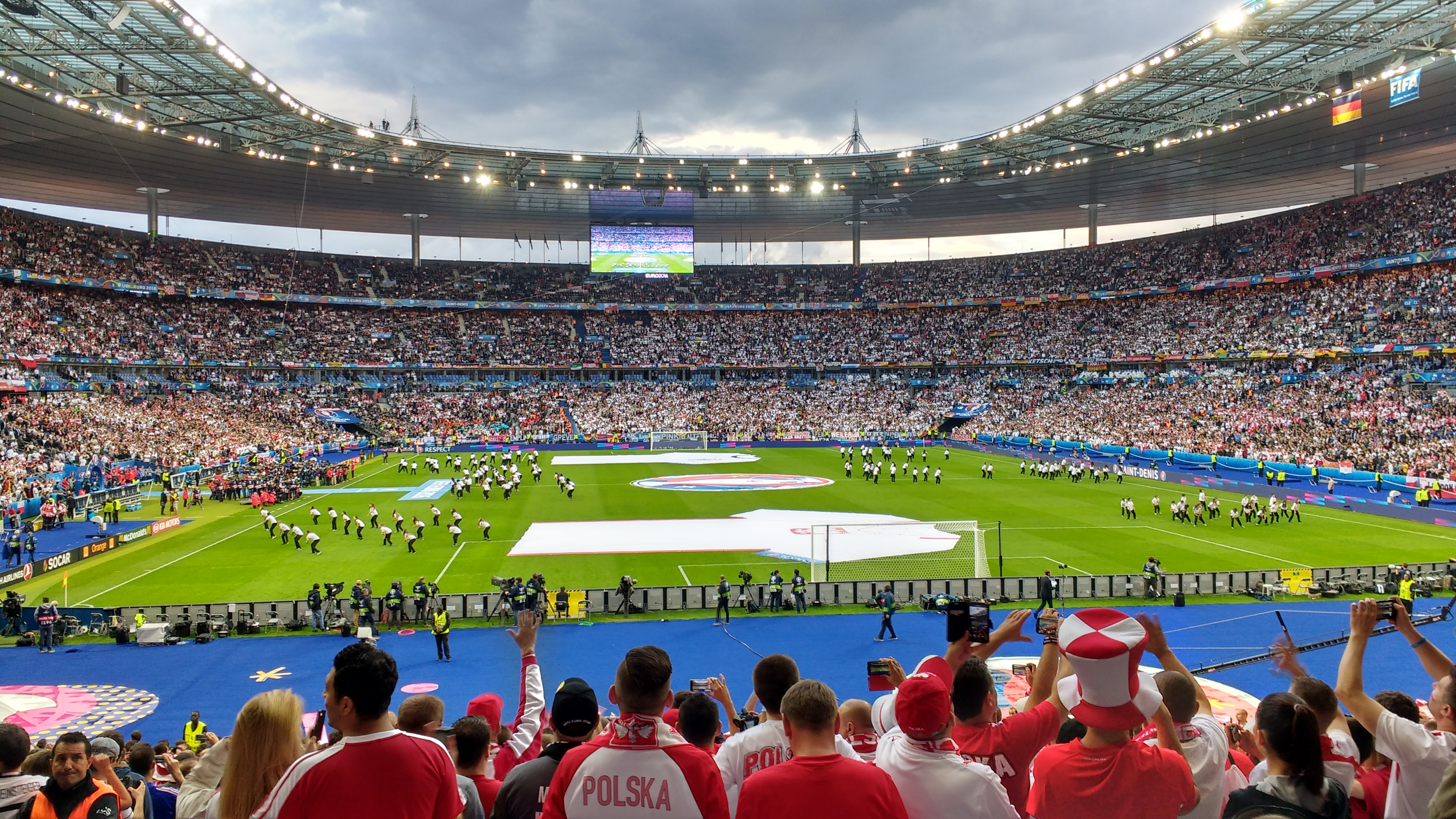
- Event: 2015–16 Coupe de la Ligue
Paris Saint-Germain	Lille
Ligue 1	Ligue 1
2	1
- Date: 23 April 2016
- Venue: Stade de France, Saint-Denis
- Man of the Match: Javier Pastore
- Referee: Ruddy Buquet
- Attendance: 68,640

The 2016 Coupe de la Ligue final was the 22nd final of France's football league cup competition, the Coupe de la Ligue, a competition for the 42 teams that the Ligue de Football Professionnel (LFP) manages. The final took place on 23 April 2016 at the Stade de France in Saint-Denis and was contested by reigning champions Paris Saint-Germain, and Lille.

== Background ==
Paris Saint-Germain were the two-time reigning champions, having won a record fifth title in the previous year's final with a 4–0 win over Bastia. It was PSG's sixth final – a joint record with Bordeaux – and they had previously won five (1995, 1998, 2008, 2014 and 2015) and lost one (2000).

Lille had never before reached the final.

== Route to the final ==
Note: In all results below, the score of the finalist is given first (H: home; A: away).

Paris Saint-Germain		Round	Lille	
Opponent	Result	2015–16 Coupe de la Ligue	Opponent	Result
Saint-Étienne (H)	1–0	Round of 16	Laval (H)	1–0
Lyon (H)	2–1	Quarter-finals	Guingamp (A)	0–0 (a.e.t.) (4–2 p)
Toulouse (H)	2–0	Semi-finals	Bordeaux (A)	5–1

== Match ==
23 April 2016
21:00

Paris Saint-Germain	2–1	Lille
Pastore 40'; Di María 74'	Report	Sidibé 49'

Stade de France, Saint-Denis
Attendance: 68,640
Referee: Ruddy Buquet

Paris Saint-Germain	Lille

PARIS SAINT-GERMAIN FC:
GK	30	(Italy) Salvatore Sirigu
CB	2	(Brazil) Thiago Silva (c)
RB	19	(Ivory Coast) Serge Aurier	(yellow card) 19'
CB	5	(Brazil) Marquinhos
LB	20	(France) Layvin Kurzawa
DM	11	(Argentina) Ángel Di María		(substituted off) 90'
CM	14	(France) Blaise Matuidi
CM	25	(France) Adrien Rabiot	(yellow card) 47' (yellow-red card) 70'
RW	27	(Argentina) Javier Pastore		(substituted off) 79'
CF	10	(Sweden) Zlatan Ibrahimović
LW	7	(Brazil) Lucas		(substituted off) 75'
Substitutes:
GK	1	(France) Nicolas Douchez
DF	17	(Brazil) Maxwell
DF	32	(Brazil) David Luiz		(substituted on) 79'
MF	4	(France) Benjamin Stambouli
MF	6	(Italy) Marco Verratti		(substituted on) 75'
FW	9	(Uruguay) Edinson Cavani		(substituted on) 90'
FW	35	(Democratic Republic of the Congo) Hervin Ongenda
Manager:
(France) Laurent Blanc

LILLE OSC:
GK	1	(Nigeria) Vincent Enyeama
DF	25	(Montenegro) Marko Baša
DF	2	(France) Sébastien Corchia
DF	19	(France) Djibril Sidibé
DF	23	(France) Adama Soumaoro
MF	31	(France) Morgan Amalfitano
MF	8	(Morocco) Mounir Obbadi
MF	24	(France) Rio Mavuba (c)	(substituted off) 77'
MF	7	(Morocco) Sofiane Boufal
MF	6	(France) Ibrahim Amadou
FW	39	(Portugal) Éder
Substitutes:
GK	16	(Martinique) Steeve Elana
DF	13	(Zambia) Stoppila Sunzu
DF	18	(France) Franck Béria
MF	4	(France) Florent Balmont
MF	32	(Portugal) Rony Lopes	(substituted on) 77'
FW	9	(Algeria) Yassine Benzia
FW	22	(Ivory Coast) Tallo Gadji
Manager:
(France) Frédéric Antonetti

Man of the Match: Javier Pastore

Assistant referees:
Cyril Gringore
Guillaume Debart
Fourth official:
Lionel Jaffredo

Match rules

- 90 minutes.
- 30 minutes of extra-time if necessary.
- Penalty shoot-out if scores still level.
- Seven named substitutes.
- Maximum of three substitutions.

== See also ==
- 2016 Coupe de France final
- 2015–16 Lille OSC season
- 2015–16 Paris Saint-Germain FC season
