= 2015–16 Coupe de la Ligue =

French League Cup

Tournament details
- Country: France
- Dates: 11 August 2015 – 23 April 2016
- Teams: 42

Final positions
- Champions: Paris Saint-Germain (6th title)
- Runners-up: Lille

Tournament statistics
- Matches played: 42
- Goals scored: 122 (2.9 per match)
- Top goal scorer: Lakdar Boussaha (6)

The 2015–16 Coupe de la Ligue was the 22nd French league cup competition. The competition was organized by the Ligue de Football Professionnel and was open to the 44 professional clubs in France that are managed by the organization.

Paris Saint-Germain were the two-time reigning champions, having defeated Bastia 4–0 in the previous season's final and their win in this competition 2–1 against Lille put the club at six wins, extending their record.

== First round ==
First round matches were held over 1 day; 11 August 2015. The 12 winners secured places in the second round. All times in Central European Time.

11 August 2015	Lens (2)	0–0 (a.e.t.) (2–4 p)	Ajaccio (2)	Lens
18:30				Stadium: Stade Bollaert-Delelis; Attendance: 20,396; Referee: Wilfried Bien
	Penalties
	Valdivia (penalty missed); Landre (penalty scored); Cyprien (penalty missed); Bekamenga (penalty scored)		(penalty scored) Lesoimier; (penalty scored) Frikeche; (penalty scored) Toudic; (penalty scored) Diallo

11 August 2015	Laval (2)	1–0	Nîmes (2)	Laval
20:00	Alla 5'			Stadium: Stade Francis Le Basser; Attendance: 4,692; Referee: Thomas Leonard

11 August 2015	Auxerre (2)	1–0	Red Star (2)	Auxerre
20:00	Courtet 36'			Stadium: Stade de l'Abbé-Deschamps; Attendance: 4,083; Referee: Olivier Husset

11 August 2015	Brest (2)	2–2 (a.e.t.) (3–5 p)	Bourg-Péronnas (2)	Lens
20:00	Cuvillier 28'; Pelé 45'		Boussaha 7', 87'	Stadium: Stade Bollaert-Delelis; Attendance: 5,299; Referee: Jérôme Brisard
	Penalties
	Pelé (penalty missed); Sankoh (penalty scored); Adnane (penalty scored); Grougi (penalty scored)		(penalty scored) Lacour; (penalty scored) Berthomier; (penalty scored) Damour; (penalty scored) Moulaye; (penalty scored) Boussaha

11 August 2015	Arles-Avignon (3)	w/o	Évian (2)
20:00

11 August 2015	Nancy (2)	2–1	Châteauroux (3)	Tomblaine
20:00	Robic 3' (pen.); Dalé 90+1'		Garita 59' (pen.)	Stadium: Stade Marcel Picot; Attendance: 1,568; Referee: François Letexier

11 August 2015	Paris FC (2)	1–2 (a.e.t.)	Metz (2)	Paris
20:00	Kinkela 70'		Ngbakoto 17'; Bussmann 92'	Stadium: Stade Charléty; Attendance: 2,466; Referee: Hamid Guenaoui

11 August 2015	Valenciennes (2)	1–3	Clermont (2)	Valenciennes
20:00	Fulgini 68'		Diedhiou 9'; Jobello 44', 66'	Stadium: Stade du Hainaut; Attendance: 3,166; Referee: Aurelien Petit

11 August 2015	Sochaux (2)	3–2	Niort (2)	Montbéliard
20:00	Cacérès 51', 61'; Sao 68'		Omrani 56'; Koné 72'	Stadium: Stade Auguste Bonal; Attendance: 5,524; Referee: Alexandre Perreau Niel

11 August 2015	Orléans (3)	1–2	Tours (2)	Orléans
20:00	Armand 27'		Bergougnoux 53' (pen.); Berenguer 81'	Stadium: Stade de la Source; Attendance: 2,207; Referee: Stephane Jochem

11 August 2015	Dijon (2)	3–3 (a.e.t.) (4–3 p)	Créteil (2)	Dijon
20:00	Diony 8'; Sammaritano 53' (pen.); Tavares 69' (pen.)		Dias 30' (pen.); Sacko 31'; Esor 90'	Stadium: Stade Gaston Gérard; Attendance: 4,358
	Penalties
	Bernard (penalty scored); Tavares (penalty missed); Bela (penalty missed); Amalfitano (penalty scored); Jullien (penalty scored); Benet (penalty scored)		(penalty missed) Augusto; (penalty scored) Di Bartolomeo; (penalty scored) Montaroup; (penalty scored) Lesage; (penalty missed) Clémence; (penalty missed) Mahon de Monaghan

11 August 2015	Le Havre (2)	1–2	CA Bastia (3)	Le Havre
20:00	Lekhal 42'		Leca 22'; Sonnerat 70'	Stadium: Stade Océane; Attendance: 5,378; Referee: Sylvain Palhies

== Second round ==
The round featured the 12 winners of the first-round matches. The matches were held over 1 day; 25 August 2015. The 6 winners secured places in the third round. All games in Central European Time.

25 August 2015	Évian (2)	3–2	Clermont (2)	Annecy
18:30	Centonze 17'; Altolaguirre 27'; Appindangoyé 48'		Jobello 73'; Saadi 88' (pen.)	Stadium: Parc des Sports; Attendance: 2,141; Referee: Floris Aubin

25 August 2015	Dijon (2)	2–0	Metz (2)	Dijon
20:00	Thiam 45'; Diony 81'			Stadium: Stade Gaston Gérard; Attendance: 3,722; Referee: Johann Hamel

25 August 2015	Tours (2)	2–0	Sochaux (2)	Tours
20:00	Belkebla 67'; Kouakou 71'			Stadium: Stade de la Vallée du Cher; Attendance: 4,751; Referee: Stephanie Frappart

25 August 2015	Ajaccio (2)	1–2	Laval (2)	Ajaccio
20:00	Cavalli 24' (pen.)		Gonçalves 48'; Alioui 117'	Stadium: Stade François Coty; Attendance: 2,985; Referee: Florent Batta

25 August 2015	Bourg-Péronnas (2)	0–0 (a.e.t.) (5–4 p)	Nancy (2)	Péronnas
20:00				Stadium: Stade Municipal de Péronnas; Attendance: 961; Referee: Jeremy Stinat
	Penalties
	Damour (penalty scored); Dimitriou (penalty scored); Diompy (penalty scored); Sané (penalty scored); Boussaha (penalty scored)		(penalty scored) Dalé; (penalty scored) Hadji; (penalty scored) Pedretti; (penalty missed) Robic; (penalty scored) Guidileye

25 August 2015	CA Bastia (3)	1–1 (a.e.t.) (0–3 p)	Auxerre (2)	Bastia
20:00	Guidiala 8'		Bouby 45'	Stadium: Stade Armand Cesari; Attendance: 475; Referee: Jeremy Stinat
	Penalties
	Seymand (penalty missed); Diawara (penalty missed); Bru (penalty missed)		(penalty scored) Bouby; (penalty scored) Sefil; (penalty scored) Fontaine

== Third round ==
The Third Round, also known as the Round of 32, featured the 6 winners of the second round matches in addition to 14 Ligue 1 clubs who were not participating in the European competitions. The matches were played 27 and 28 October 2015, and 25 November 2015. All games in Central European Time.

27 October 2015	Évian (2)	2–2 (a.e.t.) (4–5 p)	Laval (2)	Annecy
20:00	Campanharo 80'; Hoggas 120'		Viale 6'; Monfray 107'	Stadium: Parc des Sports; Attendance: 2,824; Referee: Johan Hamel
	Penalties
	Hoggas (penalty scored); Altolaguirre (penalty scored); Soares (penalty scored); Campanharo (penalty missed); Kamin (penalty scored)		Alla (penalty scored); Gonçalves (penalty scored); Monfray (penalty scored); Zeoula (penalty scored); Alioui (penalty scored)

27 October 2015	Tours (2)	1–0	Angers (1)	Tours
20:00	Miracoli 52'			Stadium: Stade de la Vallée du Cher; Attendance: 10,139; Referee: Hakim Ben El Hadj

27 October 2015	Bastia (1)	0–1	Rennes (1)	Bastia
21:00			Doucouré 59'	Stadium: Stade Armand Cesari; Attendance: 3,048; Referee: Stéphane Lannoy

28 October 2015	Dijon (2)	2–1	Reims (1)	Dijon
20:00	Diony 17'; Bela 39'		Charbonnier 19'	Stadium: Stade Gaston Gérard; Attendance: 4,849; Referee: Lionel Jaffredo

28 October 2015	Bourg-Péronnas (2)	3–2 (a.e.t.)	Nantes (1)	Gueugnon
21:00	Traoré 38'; Boussaha 57' (pen.), 104' (pen.)		Adryan 26', 51'	Stadium: Stadium Jean-Laville; Attendance: 4,694; Referee: François Letexier

28 October 2015	Caen (1)	1–2	Nice (1)	Caen
21:00	Delort 14'		Mendy 57', 90+2'	Stadium: Stade Michel d'Ornano; Attendance: 10,098; Referee: Stéphane Jochem

28 October 2015	Lorient (1)	3–2	Montpellier (1)	Lorient
21:00	Jeannot 6' (pen.); Gakpa 36'; Philippoteaux 41'		N'Diaye 12'; Camara 85'	Stadium: Stade du Moustoir; Attendance: 9,699; Referee: Wilfried Bien

28 October 2015	Lille (1)	2–1	Troyes (1)	Villeneuve d'Ascq
21:00	Sunzu 49'; Guirassy 57'		Perea 29'	Stadium: Stade Pierre-Mauroy; Attendance: 9,886; Referee: Benoît Bastien

28 October 2015	Toulouse (1)	3–3 (a.e.t.) (2–1 p)	Auxerre (2)	Toulouse
21:00	Ben Yedder 73', 88'; Bodiger 114'		Kılıç 32'; Sefil 82'; Courtet 103'	Stadium: Stadium Municipal; Attendance: 6,298; Referee: Aurélien Petit
	Penalties
	Ben Yedder (penalty scored); Regattin (penalty missed); Braithwaite (penalty scored); Spajić (penalty missed)		(penalty scored) Bouby; (penalty missed) Diaw; (penalty missed) Courtet; (penalty missed) Hountondji; (penalty missed) Sefil

25 November 2015	Gazélec Ajaccio (1)	0–1 (a.e.t.)	Guingamp (1)	Ajaccio
18:30			Privat 104'	Stadium: Stade Ange-Casanova

== Round of 16 ==
The Fourth Round, also known as the Round of 16, featured the 10 winners of the third round matches in addition to 6 Ligue 1 clubs who were participating in the European competitions. The matches were played on 15 and 16 December 2015.

15 December 2015	Guingamp (1)	2–2 (a.e.t.) (4–3 p)	Nice (1)	Guingamp
20:00	Salibur 89', 110'		Mendy 44', 93'	Stadium: Stade du Roudourou
	Penalties
	De Pauw (penalty scored); Angoua (penalty scored); Sankhare (penalty missed); Dembele (penalty scored); Lössl (penalty missed); Salibur (penalty scored)		Germain (penalty scored); Ben Arfa (penalty scored); Pied (penalty missed); Seri (penalty scored); Boscagli (penalty missed); Le Marchand (penalty missed)

15 December 2015	Lille (1)	1–0	Laval (2)	Villeneuve d'Ascq
20:00	Sidibé 79'			Stadium: Stade Pierre-Mauroy

15 December 2015	Lorient (1)	3–0	Dijon (2)	Lorient
20:00	Jeannot 37'; Philippoteaux 54'; Mesloub 89'			Stadium: Stade du Moustoir

15 December 2015	Rennes (1)	1–3	Toulouse (1)	Rennes
21:00	Diagné 57' (pen.)		Ben Yedder 13', 32'; Blin 84'	Stadium: Roazhon Park

16 December 2015	Bordeaux (1)	3–0	Monaco (1)	Bordeaux
17:00	Ounas 16'; Rolán 57'; Saivet 89'			Stadium: Matmut Atlantique

16 December 2015	Bourg-Péronnas (2)	2–3	Marseille (1)	Bourg-en-Bresse
18:45	Boussaha 27' (pen.), 90+3'		Sarr 13'; Ocampos 50'; Cabella 75'	Stadium: Stade Marcel-Verchère

16 December 2015	Lyon (1)	2–1	Tours (2)	Lyon
20:00	Beauvue 38' (pen.); Malbranque 85'		Tandia 72'	Stadium: Stade de Gerland

16 December 2015	Paris Saint-Germain (1)	1–0	Saint-Étienne (1)	Paris
21:00	Cavani 86'			Stadium: Parc des Princes

== Quarter-finals ==
The Fifth Round, also known as the quarter-finals, featured the 8 winners of the Round of 16 matches. The four matches were played on 12 and 13 January 2016.

12 January 2016	Bordeaux (1)	2–0	Lorient (1)	Bordeaux
21:00	Plašil 44'; Chaigneau 56' (o.g.)			Stadium: Nouveau Stade de Bordeaux

13 January 2016	Toulouse (1)	2–1 (a.e.t.)	Marseille (1)	Toulouse
17:00	Ben Yedder 25'; Braithwaite 99'		Nkoulou 27'	Stadium: Stadium Municipal; Referee: Benoît Millot

13 January 2016	Guingamp (1)	0–0 (a.e.t.) (2–4 p)	Lille (1)	Guingamp
18:45				Stadium: Stade du Roudourou
	Penalties
	Giresse (penalty scored); Benezet (penalty missed); Erdinç (penalty scored); Lévêque (penalty missed)		(penalty scored) Boufal; (penalty scored) Sidibé; (penalty scored) Junior Tallo; (penalty missed) Mavuba; (penalty scored) Bauthéac

13 January 2016	Paris Saint-Germain (1)	2–1	Lyon (1)	Paris
21:00	Rabiot 17'; Lucas 73'		Tolisso 42'	Stadium: Parc des Princes

== Semi-finals ==
The semi-finals were drawn after the quarter-finals and were played on 26 and 27 January 2016.

26 January 2016	Lille (1)	5–1	Bordeaux (1)	Villeneuve-d'Ascq
21:00	Benzia 7'; Sané 41' (o.g.); Soumaoro 45'; Bauthéac 56'; Boufal 90+3'	Report	Chantôme 33'	Stadium: Stade Pierre-Mauroy

27 January 2016	Paris Saint-Germain (1)	2–0	Toulouse (1)	Paris
21:05	Lavezzi 65'; Di María 72'	Report		Stadium: Parc des Princes

== Final ==
23 April 2016
21:00

Paris Saint-Germain	2–1	Lille
Pastore 40'; Di María 74'	Report	Sidibé 49'

Stade de France, Saint-Denis
Attendance: 68,640
Referee: Ruddy Buquet

== See also ==
- 2015–16 Ligue 1
- 2015–16 Ligue 2
