= Morgan Amalfitano =

French footballer (born 1985)

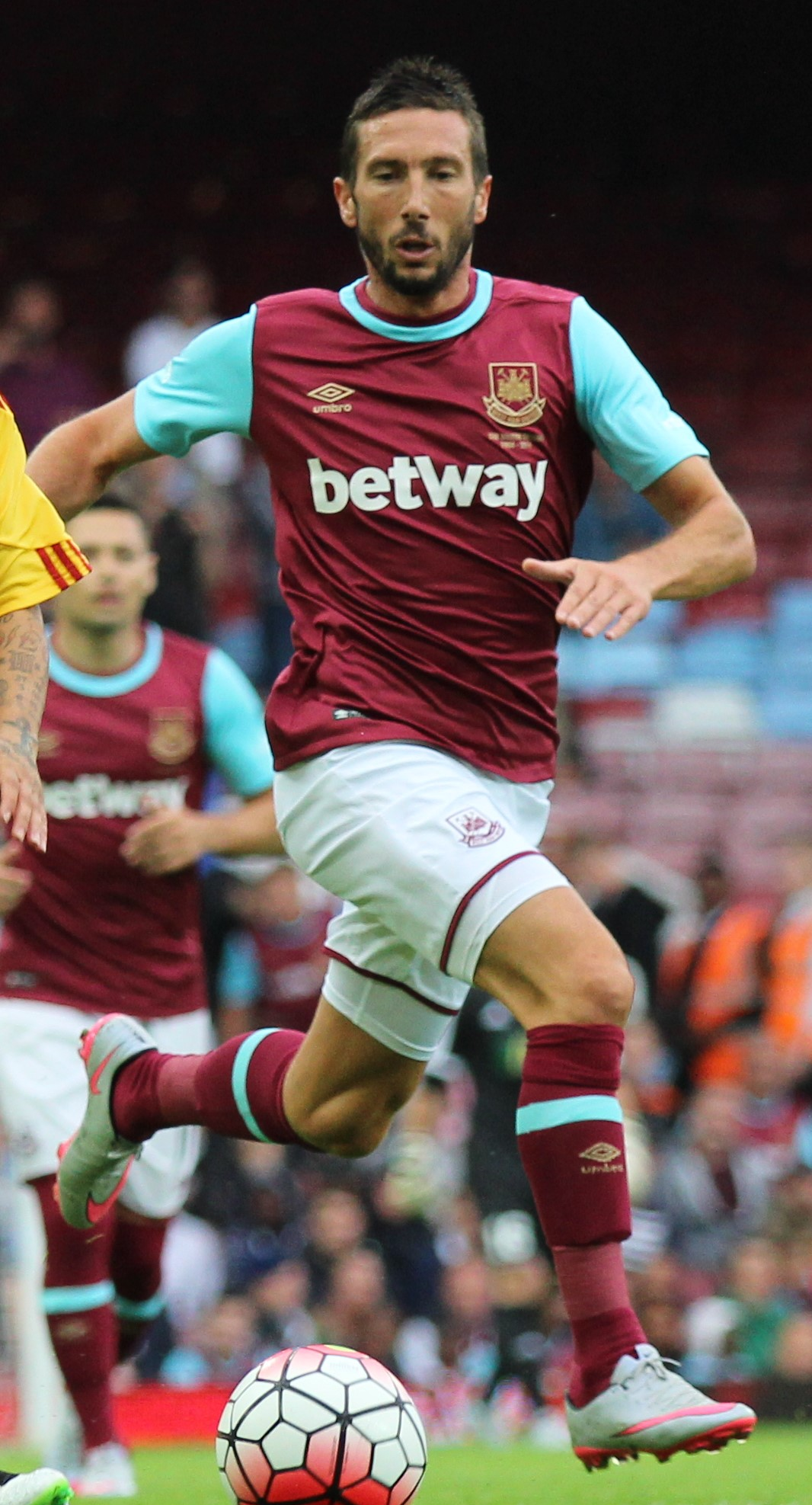
- Amalfitano playing for West Ham United in 2015

Personal information
- Full name: Morgan Henri René Amalfitano
- Date of birth: 20 March 1985 (age 41)
- Place of birth: Nice, Alpes-Maritimes, France
- Height: 1.76 m (5 ft 9 in)
- Position: Midfielder

Youth career
- Cannes

Senior career*
Years	Team	Apps	(Gls)
2003–2008	Sedan	126	(0)
2008–2011	Lorient	110	(14)
2011–2014	Marseille	60	(7)
2013–2014	→ West Bromwich Albion (loan)	28	(4)
2014–2015	West Ham United	24	(3)
2016–2017	Lille	32	(2)
2017–2018	Rennes	20	(1)
Total		400	(26)

International career
2012	France	1	(0)
- * Club domestic league appearances and goals

Morgan Henri René Amalfitano (born 20 March 1985) is a French former professional footballer who played as a midfielder.

He played for Cannes, Sedan, Lorient, Marseille, West Bromwich Albion and West Ham United. Amalfitano earned one cap for the France national team, representing his country in a friendly in February 2012.

== Club career ==
=== Early career ===
Born in Nice, Alpes-Maritimes, Amalfitano made his professional debut with CS Sedan Ardennes in a 1–1 draw against Marseille on 6 August 2006 under coach Serge Romano. He went on to play 30 games that season, starting in 28 of them. However, Sedan finished 19th and they were relegated to Ligue 2. The next season, Sedan managed to finish fourth failing to regain promotion under coach Jose Pasqualetti.

In the summer of 2008, Amalfitano moved to Ligue 1 side Lorient. He scored his first goal for Lorient, and his first professional goal, on 15 November 2008, scoring his side's first goal as they came from 2–0 down to defeat Marseille 2–3. On 23 December 2009, Amalfitano scored two goals as Lorient twice came from a goal behind to defeat Valenciennes 3–2.

On 28 March 2010, Amalfitano provided an assist and scored a goal as Lorient completed a 4–0 rout over Saint-Étienne. On 5 May, Amalfitano had a hand in both goals as Lorient drew 2–2 with Monaco, scoring his side's first equalizer before setting up Kevin Gameiro for a late equalizer that secured a point for the club. On 6 November 2010, Amalfitano provided assists for both of Gameiro's goals as Lorient defeat Saint-Étienne by a score of 2–1. In three seasons with the club, Amalfitano played 121 matches and scored 15 goals in all competitions.

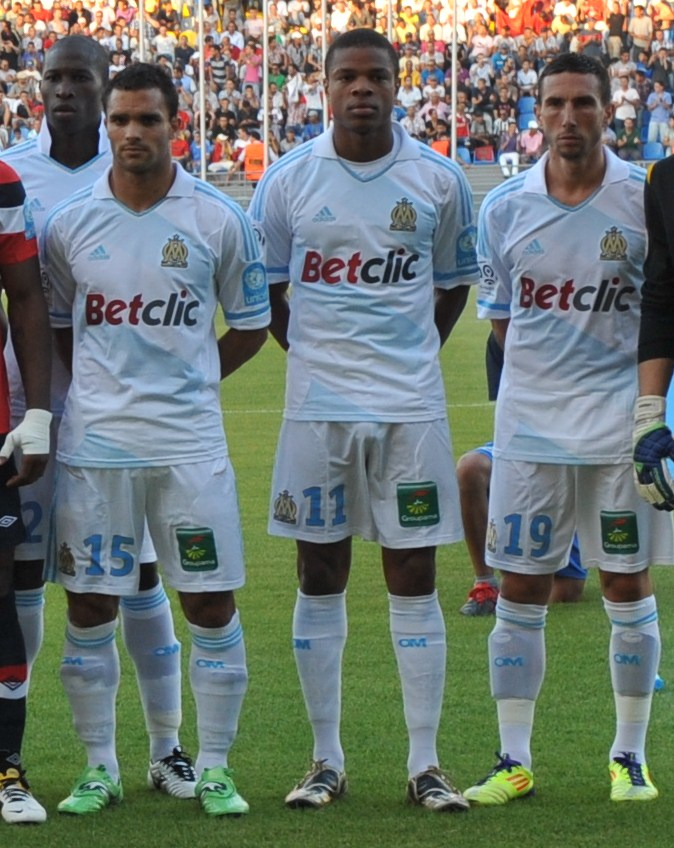
Morgan Amalfitano (19) lining up with Marseille for the 2011 Trophée des champions.

=== Marseille ===
In July 2011, Amalfitano joined Marseille on a free transfer, signing a contract until 2015. He made his debut for the club in the Trophée des Champions against Lille in a 5–4 win on 27 July, coming on as a substitute and later hitting the woodwork with his first show for the club. His competitive debut for the club came on 6 August in the first round of the new Ligue 1 season, he was substituted in the 66th minute for Mathieu Valbuena as Marseille had to settle for a 2–2 draw at home to Sochaux. He made his Champions League debut in a 1–0 win against Olympiacos on 13 September 2011. He scored his first goal for the club on 27 November 2011 in a 3–0 home victory against Paris Saint-Germain, as well as providing the assist for Jordan Ayew's goal that sealed the emphatic win. On 6 December 2011, in the final match of the group stage of the Champions League, Amalfitano provided assists for Loïc Rémy and André Ayew as a late Valbuena strike earned Marseille a 3–2 victory over Borussia Dortmund and a place in the knockout phase.

Amalfitano played the full 120 minutes on 14 April 2012 as Marseille defeated Lyon 1–0, thanks to a late Brandão strike, to win the Coupe de la Ligue trophy. Amalfitano finished the season with 49 appearances for the club, but the up-and-down campaign which ended with the club missing out on the Champions League resulted in Amalfitano asking for a transfer request.

==== West Bromwich Albion (loan) ====
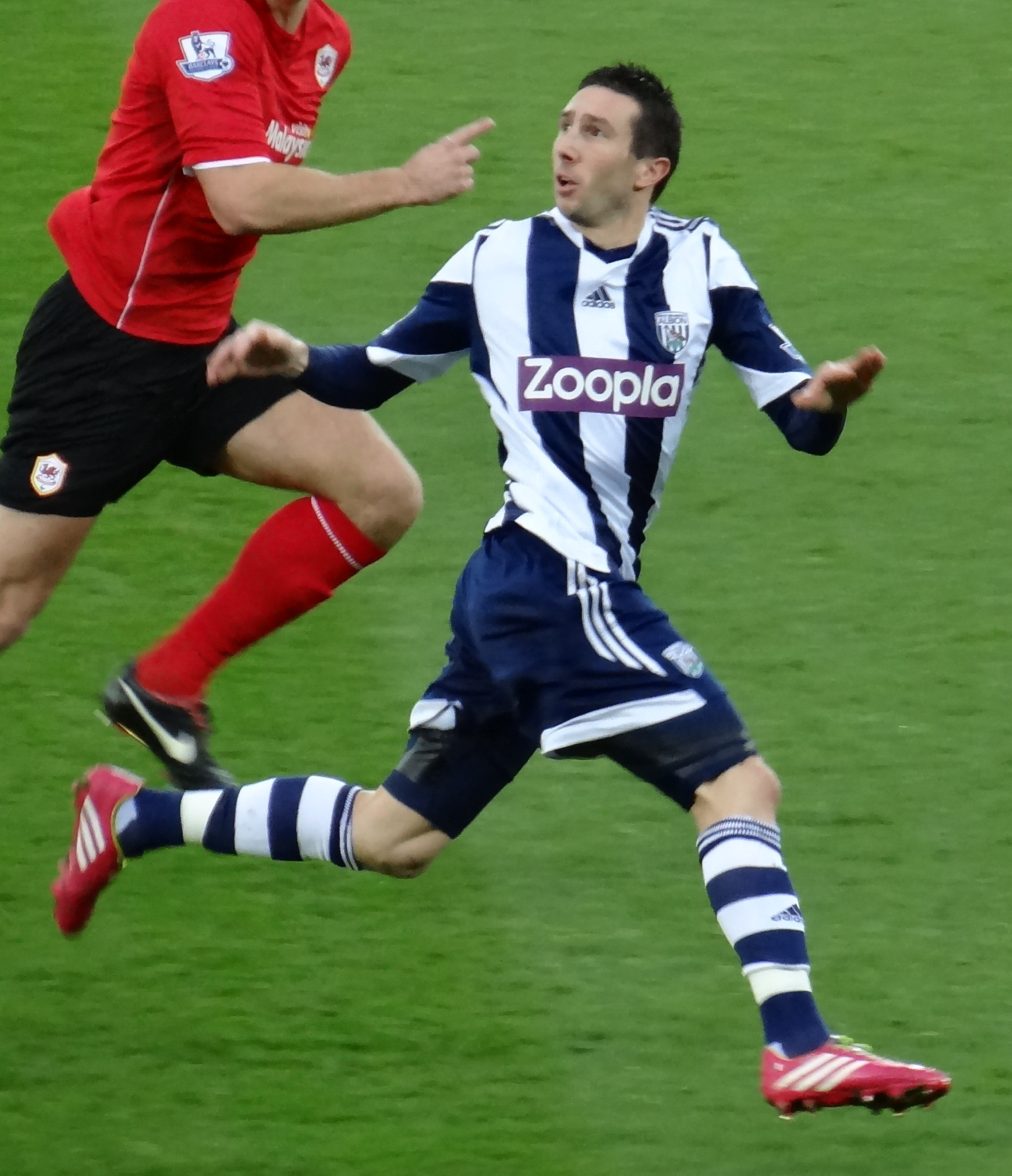
Amalfitano playing for West Brom against Cardiff City in December 2013.

On 1 September 2013, it was confirmed that Amalfitano had signed for West Bromwich Albion on a season-long loan deal with a view to a permanent transfer. He scored his first goal for West Brom against Sunderland on 21 September 2013 in a 3–0 win. Four days later he played as a substitute in a League Cup tie against Arsenal; the game went to penalties and Amalfitano missed the decisive kick as Arsenal won. He scored his second league goal the following weekend, taking the ball from midfield and then knocking it through Rio Ferdinand's legs, Amalfitano then nonchalantly dinked the ball over David de Gea, helping West Brom to a 2–1 victory over Manchester United at Old Trafford, their first win at Old Trafford since 1978.

After a positive start to life at The Hawthorns, his form declined up until the run-in in which he scored an audacious lob from 35 yards in the thrilling 3–3 draw against fellow relegations rivals Cardiff City on 29 March 2014. He followed that strike up the following week with the solitary goal in West Brom's away win over Norwich City. Upon finishing his loan at West Brom, he returned to Marseille in July 2014.

=== West Ham United ===
On 1 September 2014, Amalfitano signed for West Ham United on a one-year deal for an undisclosed fee. He made his West Ham debut two weeks later against Hull City on 15 September, replacing Diafra Sakho in the second half of the 2–2 draw.

On 20 September 2014, Amalfitano made his home debut for the Hammers, coming on in the second half and scoring his first goal for West Ham, against Liverpool, to complete a 3–1 victory and secure the club's first home win of the season. Amalfitano's second goal for the club came on 25 October at home to Manchester City when he netted the opener in a 2–1 victory over the reigning champions.

Amalfitano replaced Kevin Nolan after 60 minutes of West Ham's FA Cup fifth-round game at West Brom; ten minutes later he was booked for a heavy challenge. He then put his hand in an opponent's face resulting in the referee issuing the red card in an eventual 4–0 defeat. In March 2015, Amalfitano signed a new, two-year contract with West Ham which would keep him at the club until the end of the 2016–17 season. In August 2015, Amalfitano was disciplined for a breach of club rules by new manager Slaven Bilić. Amalfitano was banned from the first-team squad and ordered to train with the under-21 team. On 6 October 2015, Amalfitano left West Ham by mutual consent.

=== Lille ===
On 7 January 2016, Amalfitano joined French side Lille on a two-and-a-half-year deal upon his contract expiry from West Ham United in 2015.

=== Stade Rennais ===
On the final day of the 2016–17 winter transfer window, Amalfitano agreed to the termination of his contract with Lille before rejoining his former coach, Christian Gourcuff, at Stade Rennais F.C. He signed a 2.5-year deal with the club.

In August 2018, Amalfitano agreed the termination of his contract with Rennes.

== After retirement ==
Amalfitano spent a few months acting as a sporting director for French fourth tier club Étoile Fréjus Saint-Raphaël.

== International career ==
Amalfitano made his debut in a 2–1 victory for France in a friendly against neighbors Germany on 29 February 2012. He replaced his then Marseille teammate Mathieu Valbuena after 67 minutes and provided the cross from which Florent Malouda scored their second goal of the game.

== Personal life ==
Amalfitano's younger brother Romain also plays professional football.

== Career statistics ==
Appearances and goals by club, season and competition
Club	Season	League			National cup (Note: Includes Coupe de France, FA Cup)		League cup (Note: Includes Coupe de la Ligue, Football League Cup)		Continental		Other		Total	
Club	Season	Division	Apps	Goals	Apps	Goals	Apps	Goals	Apps	Goals	Apps	Goals	Apps	Goals
Sedan	2004–05	Ligue 2	26	0	—		—		—		—		26	0
Sedan	2005–06	Ligue 2	34	0	—		—		—		—		34	0
Sedan	2006–07	Ligue 1	31	0	—		—		—		—		31	0
Sedan	2007–08	Ligue 2	35	0	—		—		—		—		35	0
Sedan	Total		126	0	0	0	0	0	0	0	0	0	126	0
Lorient	2008–09	Ligue 1	35	3	1	0	1	0	—		—		37	3
Lorient	2009–10	Ligue 1	37	6	1	0	4	1	—		—		42	7
Lorient	2010–11	Ligue 1	38	5	3	0	1	0	—		—		42	5
Lorient	Total		110	14	5	0	6	1	0	0	0	0	121	15
Marseille	2011–12	Ligue 1	32	1	3	1	4	0	9 (Note: Appearances in UEFA Champions League)	0	1 (Note: Appearance in Trophée des Champions)	0	49	2
Marseille	2012–13	Ligue 1	26	1	1	0	1	0	8 (Note: Appearances in UEFA Europa League)	0	—		36	1
Marseille	Total		58	2	4	1	5	0	17	0	1	0	85	3
West Bromwich Albion (loan)	2013–14	Premier League	26	4	1	0	1	0	—		—		28	4
West Ham United	2014–15	Premier League	24	3	4	0	—		—		—		28	3
West Ham United	2015–16	Premier League	—		—		—		4	0	—		4	0
West Ham United	Total		24	3	4	0	0	0	4	0	0	0	32	3
Lille	2015–16	Ligue 1	15	2	1	0	1	0	—		—		17	2
Lille	2016–17	Ligue 1	17	0	0	0	0	0	2	0	—		19	0
Lille	Total		32	2	1	0	1	0	2	0	0	0	36	2
Rennes	2016–17	Ligue 1	6	1	—		—		—		—		6	1
Rennes	2017–18	Ligue 1	14	0	1	0	—		—		—		15	0
Rennes	Total		20	1	1	0	0	0	0	0	0	0	21	1
Career total			396	26	15	1	13	1	23	0	1	0	448	28

== Honours ==
Marseille

- Trophée des Champions: 2011
- Coupe de la Ligue: 2011–12

Lille

- Coupe de la Ligue runner-up: 2015–16
