= Lakdar Boussaha =

French footballer (born 1987)

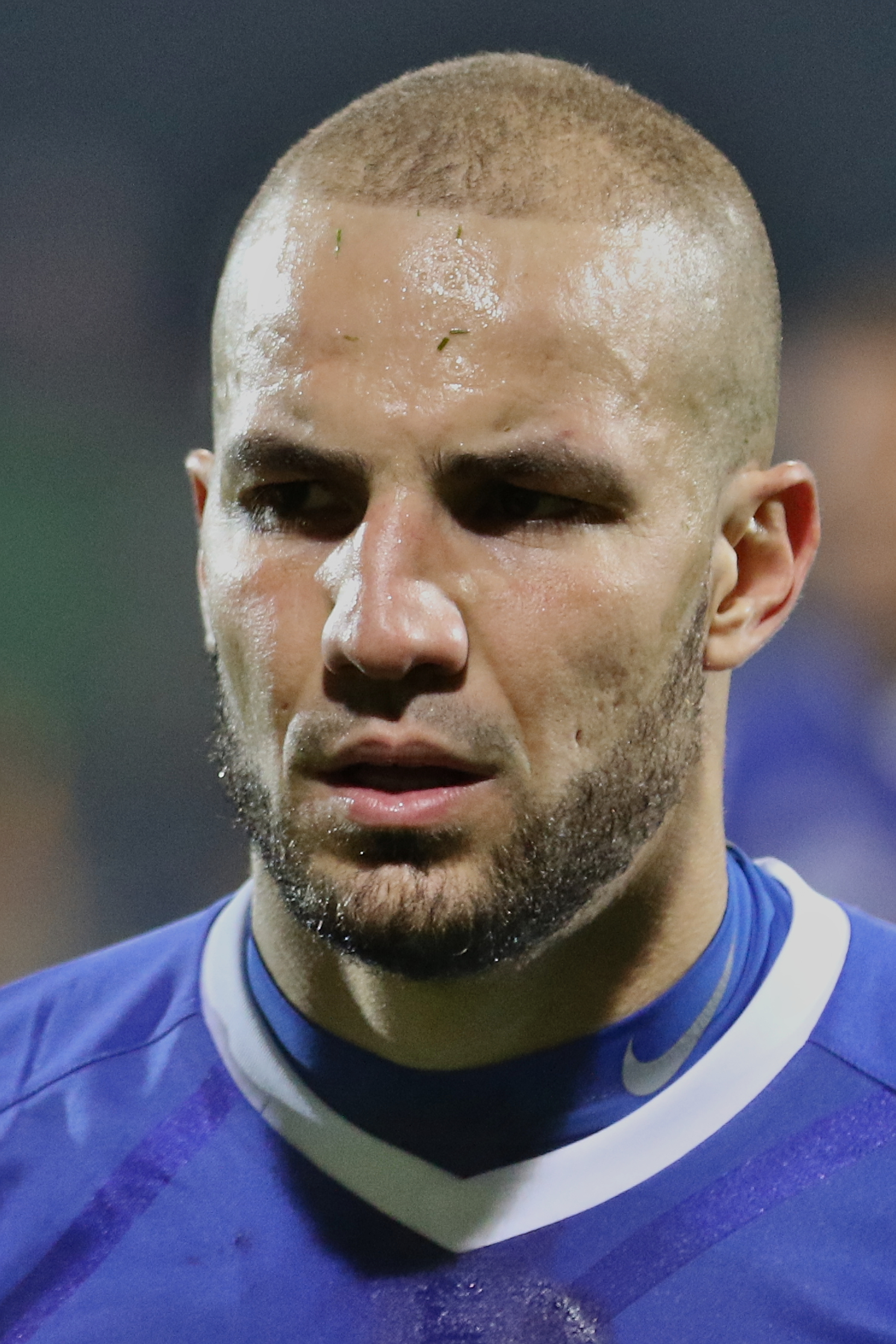

Personal information
- Date of birth: 18 July 1987 (age 39)
- Place of birth: Bourg St Maurice, France
- Height: 1.75 m (5 ft 9 in)
- Position: Forward

Youth career
- –2008: US Annecy Le Vieux
- 2008–2009: Boulogne

Senior career*
Years	Team	Apps	(Gls)
2009–2010	Boulogne	2	(0)
2010–2012	Besançon	51	(20)
2012–2013	JSM Béjaïa	17	(2)
2013–2017	Bourg-Péronnas	114	(38)
2017–2019	Grenoble	23	(1)
2019–2022	Étoile Carouge	60	(26)
- * Club domestic league appearances and goals as of 4 June 2022

Lakdar Boussaha (born 18 July 1987) is a French professional footballer who plays as a forward.

== Club career ==
Born in Bourg St Maurice, France, Boussaha started his career in the junior ranks of US Annecy Le Vieux. At the start of the 2008–09 season, he joined the US Boulogne reserve team, scoring 15 league goals and adding 7 more in the cup. He was promoted to the first team at the start of the 2009–10 season, and after netting 11 goals in 5 games for the reserve team, he was given his Ligue 1 debut on 4 October 2009, in a league game against Lille OSC. Boussaha started the game and was replaced at the 54th minute.

At the end of the 2009–10 season, the club announced that his contract would not renewed.

On 20 May 2010, Boussaha went on trial with Algerian club JSM Béjaïa.

In August 2019, Boussaha joined Swiss Promotion League club Étoile Carouge FC.
