= Alexis Araujo =

Association football player (born 1996)

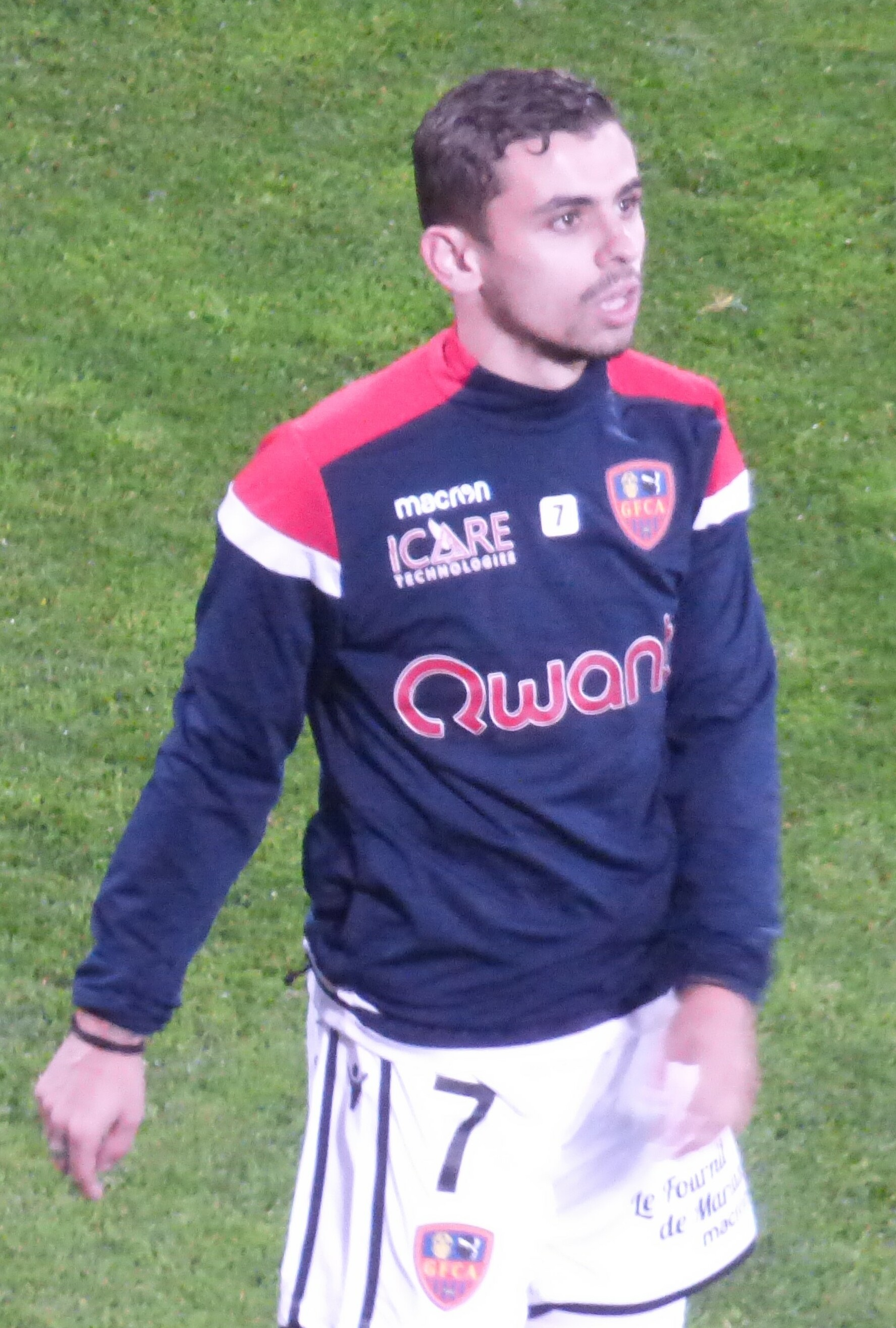
- Araujo with Gazélec Ajaccio in 2018

Personal information
- Date of birth: 7 November 1996 (age 30)
- Place of birth: Tourcoing, France
- Height: 1.59 m (5 ft 3 in)
- Position: Attacking midfielder

Team information
- Current team: La Roche
- Number: 20

Youth career
- 2002–2003: Tourcoing
- 2003–2015: Lille

Senior career*
Years	Team	Apps	(Gls)
2013–2017	Lille B	51	(8)
2015–2017	Lille	1	(0)
2016	→ Boulogne (loan)	14	(2)
2016–2017	→ Dunkerque (loan)	30	(4)
2017–2019	Gazélec Ajaccio	37	(1)
2019	→ Quevilly-Rouen (loan)	13	(1)
2019–2020	Quevilly-Rouen	17	(1)
2020–2021	SC Lyon	15	(1)
2021–2024	Créteil	76	(6)
2024–	La Roche	40	(8)

International career
2012	France U16	3	(0)
2013	Portugal U17	1	(0)
- * Club domestic league appearances and goals as of 4 December 2025

Alexis Araujo (born 7 November 1996) is a professional footballer who plays as an attacking midfielder for Ligue 3 club La Roche. Born in France, he represented both France and Portugal at youth level.

== Club career ==
Araujo is a youth exponent from Lille. He made his Ligue 1 debut on 21 November 2015 against Troyes replacing Éric Bauthéac after 87 minutes in a 1–1 away draw.

During the second half of the 2015–16 season he was loaned out to Championnat National side Boulogne. He stayed in the Championnat National the following season, moving to Dunkerque on loan.

Araujo was released from his contract by Lille in October 2017, and signed for Gazélec Ajaccio in Ligue 2. After 37 Ligue 2 appearances in a 16 months, he was loaned to Quevilly-Rouen in January 2019, until the end of the 2018–19 season. After a successful loan spell, he joined Quevilly-Rouen on a permanent deal in June 2019.

In August 2020 Araujo followed his Quevilly-Rouen manager to SC Lyon, signing an initial one-year contract with the club.

In July 2021, Araujo moved to Créteil.

== International career ==
Araujo was born in France to parents of Portuguese nationality. He debuted for the France U16s, making three appearances for them. Within the year, in 2013, he debuted for the Portugal U17s. He remains eligible for both France and Portugal.
