= Sonhy Sefil =

Martiniquais footballer (born 1994)

Personal information
- Full name: Sonhy Gessi Sefil
- Date of birth: 16 June 1994 (age 32)
- Place of birth: Schœlcher, Martinique
- Height: 1.94 m (6 ft 4 in)
- Position: Centre-back

Team information
- Current team: CS Neuville
- Number: 4

Senior career*
Years	Team	Apps	(Gls)
2012–2013	Sedan B	3	(0)
2013–2016	Auxerre	23	(3)
2016–2017	Asteras Tripolis	5	(0)
2017–2018	AS Lyon-Duchère	30	(1)
2019–2020	Oldham Athletic	4	(0)
2019	→ Ashton United (loan)	2	(0)
2020–2021	Union Titus Pétange	12	(0)
2021–2023	Lyon La Duchère	39	(2)
2023–	CS Neuville		
- * Club domestic league appearances and goals as of 20:35, 28 December 2023 (UTC)

Sonhy Gessi Sefil (born 16 June 1994) is a Martiniquais professional footballer who plays as a centre-back for CS Neuville.

== Career ==
Sefil joined Asteras Tripolis in the summer of 2016.
