= Sébastien Corchia =

French footballer (born 1990)

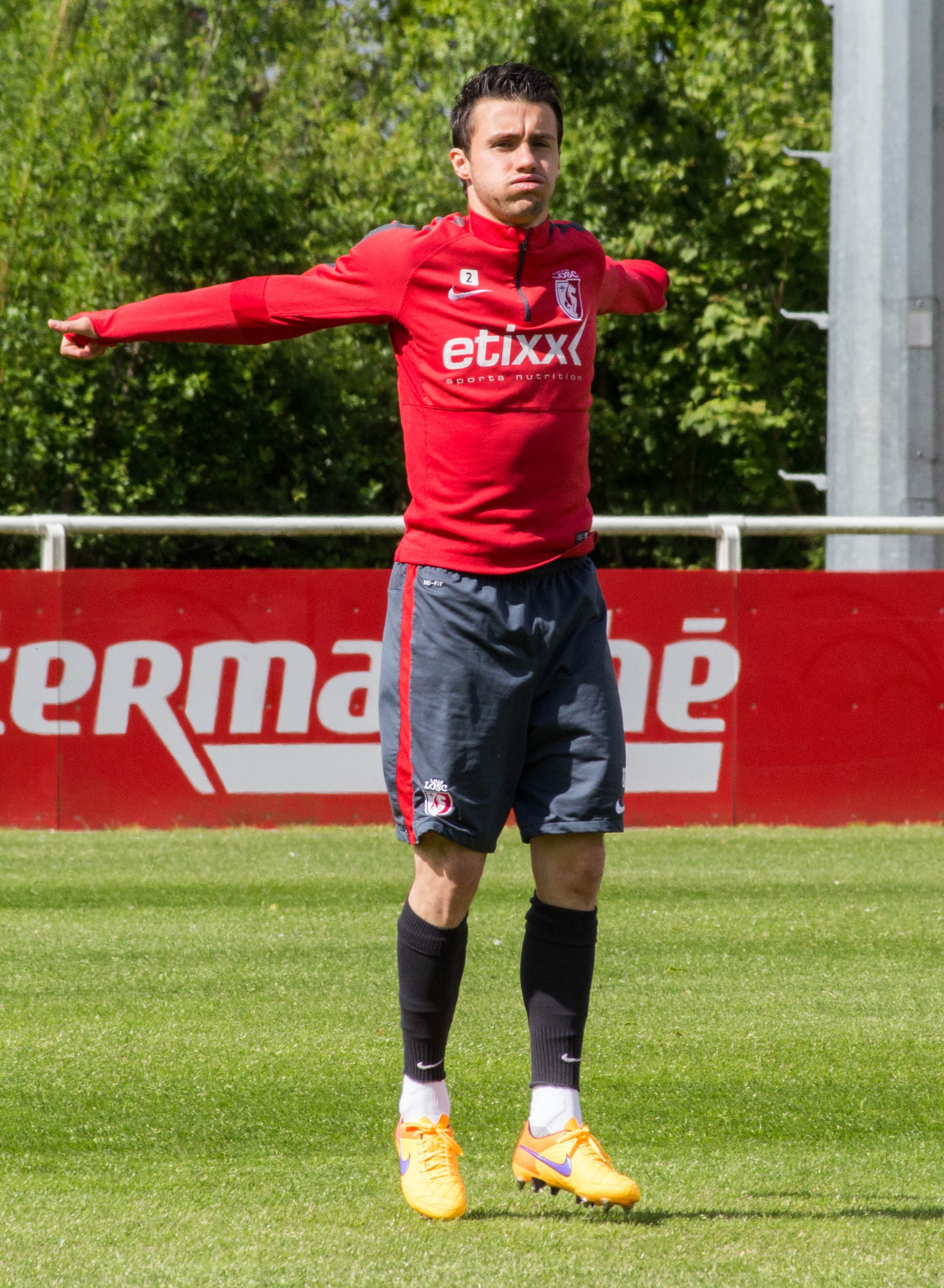
- Corchia with Lille in 2015

Personal information
- Full name: Sébastien Mathieu Corchia
- Date of birth: 1 November 1990 (age 36)
- Place of birth: Noisy-le-Sec, Seine-Saint-Denis, France
- Height: 1.75 m (5 ft 9 in)
- Position: Right-back

Team information
- Current team: Cannes
- Number: 14

Youth career
- 1996–1998: Rosny-sous-Bois
- 1998–2003: Villemomble
- 2003–2006: Clairefontaine
- 2003–2004: → Bondy
- 2004–2006: Paris Saint-Germain
- 2006–2009: Le Mans

Senior career*
Years	Team	Apps	(Gls)
2009–2011	Le Mans	80	(3)
2011–2014	Sochaux	98	(4)
2014–2017	Lille	102	(4)
2017–2020	Sevilla	12	(0)
2018–2019	→ Benfica (loan)	2	(0)
2019	→ Benfica B (loan)	2	(0)
2019–2020	→ Espanyol (loan)	3	(0)
2020–2023	Nantes	75	(0)
2023–2025	Amiens	56	(0)
2025–	Cannes	0	(0)

International career
2006–2007	France U17	2	(0)
2008	France U18	3	(0)
2008–2009	France U19	19	(0)
2009–2012	France U21	26	(3)
2016	France	1	(0)
- * Club domestic league appearances and goals as of 12 May 2025

Sébastien Mathieu Corchia (pronounced [ˈkɔrkja]; born 1 November 1990) is a French professional footballer who plays as a right-back for Ligue 3 club Cannes.

A French international, he gained one cap in 2016. Due to his French and Italian ancestry, Corchia holds dual nationality.

== Club career ==
=== Early career ===
Corchia was born in Noisy-le-Sec, Seine-Saint-Denis, and started his career with hometown club Stade Olympique de Rosny-sous-Bois Football. After a two-year stint at the club, he joined semi-professional outfit Villemomble Sports. Corchia spent five years at the club, and in 2003, was selected to attend the prestigious Clairefontaine academy. While training at Clairefontaine during the week, Corchia played with amateur club AS Bondy on the weekends. Shortly before the end of his tenure at Clairefontaine, he also trained at the Camp des Loges, the youth training center of Paris Saint-Germain.

=== Le Mans ===
After his departure from the academy, Corchia joined Le Mans on an aspirant (youth) contract. His performances with Le Mans's Championnat de France amateur team and France's international youth teams led to interest from Serie A club Juventus and Premier League club Arsenal. Corchia remained in Le Mans's youth system until receiving his first call up to the senior squad on 14 February 2009 for the team's league match against Nice. He started the match playing 68 minutes before being substituted out. Le Mans lost the match 2–1 with both goals being scored with Corchia off the pitch. The following week, he earned another start against Marseille where he went up against the likes of Mathieu Valbuena, Bolo Zenden, and Hatem Ben Arfa. This was where he had started gaining his reputation. Towards the end of the season, Corchia became the first choice starting all ten matches he appeared in.

On 1 May 2009, Corchia agreed to his first professional contract signing with Le Mans until June 2012. For the 2009–10 season, new manager Paulo Duarte installed Corchia as the first-choice right back for the season. On 12 December, he scored his first professional goal in a 2–1 victory over Valenciennes. In the return fixture against Valenciennes, Corchia scored his second career goal converting a free kick in injury time. The game-winning goal helped Le Mans remain in contention to stay in Ligue 1, though the team was later relegated.

=== Sochaux ===
On 30 June 2011, after spending a season playing with Le Mans in the second division, Corchia returned to Ligue 1 joining Sochaux on a four-year contract. The transfer fee was undisclosed. Corchia made his competitive debut for the club in its opening league match of the season against Marseille. In the match, he assisted on the team's opening goal scored by Marvin Martin. The match finished in a 2–2 draw. Sébastien Corchia's first goal came in an away match against Rennes on 23 February 2013.

On 29 January 2014, he signed with Lille OSC with a four-and-a-half-year contract. However, his contract was not officially recognized by the French financial authority in football, due to Lille's financial difficulties, and so he returned to Sochaux.

=== Lille ===
On 27 June 2014, Corchia finally joined Lille on a four-year deal after Sochaux had been relegated in the 2013–14 season.

=== Sevilla ===
On 13 July 2017, Corchia joined Sevilla on a four-year deal for 7.5 million euros. He was handed the jersey number 2.

On 19 August 2018, Corchia joined Portuguese side Benfica on a season-long loan. He debuted for the Lisbon team in a 3–0 away win over Sertanense in the third round of the Taça de Portugal, on 18 October 2018.

On 21 August 2019, Corchia joined RCD Espanyol on a season-long loan deal which includes a buyout clause.

== International career ==
Sébastien is a French youth international. He has played on the under-17, under-18, and the under-19 team. With the under-17 team, Corchia made his debut in a 2–1 friendly defeat to the Czech Republic appearing as a substitute in the second half for Julien Berthomier. His only other appearance with the team was the return match against the Czech Republic, which ended 1–1. Corchia was a late participant with the under-18 team making his debut in the Slovakia Cup on 28 April 2008 against the hosts. He appeared in all three group stage matches, which is where France suffered elimination.

Corchia was a key participant in the under-19 team that qualified for the 2009 UEFA European Under-19 Football Championship and was named to the tournament playing the full 90 minutes in the squad's opening 1–1 draw with Serbia. He played in all four of the squad's matches including the semi-final, where they suffered elimination losing 1–3 in extra time to England with Corchia receiving a red card. He appeared in all 19 matches the team contested. Corchia is also eligible to represent the country of his father's ancestors, Italy. He has dual citizenship with France and Italy and holds an Italian passport.

On 27 August 2009, Corchia was selected to the under-21 squad, for the first time, for their upcoming 2011 UEFA European Under-21 Football Championship qualification matches against Slovenia on 4 September and Ukraine on 8 September. Corchia made his debut in the Ukraine match starting in the right back position. France drew the match 1–1. Corchia appeared with the team in the next five matches before dropping out of the selection that was to play in two friendly matches against Argentina in Buenos Aires on 20 and 24 May.

On 25 August 2016, Corchia was called up to the senior squad for the first time for a friendly against Italy and a 2018 FIFA World Cup qualification against Belarus.

Corchia made his debut on 15 November against Ivory Coast, replacing Djibril Sidibé for the final 21 minutes of a 0–0 home draw.

== Career statistics ==
=== Club ===
As of 1 July 2023

Appearances and goals by club, season and competition
Club	Season	League			Cup (Note: Appearances in Coupe de France, Coupe de la Ligue, Trophée des Champions, Copa del Rey)		Continental (Note: Appearances in UEFA Supercup and UEFA Europa League)		Total	
Club	Season	Division	Apps	Goals	Apps	Goals	Apps	Goals	Apps	Goals
Le Mans	2008–09	Ligue 1	9	0	1	0	—		10	0
Le Mans	2009–10	Ligue 1	35	2	2	0	—		37	2
Le Mans	2010–11	Ligue 2	36	1	4	1	—		40	2
Le Mans	Total		80	3	7	1	—		87	4
Sochaux	2011–12	Ligue 1	31	0	1	0	2	0	34	0
Sochaux	2012–13	Ligue 1	34	1	1	0	—		35	1
Sochaux	2013–14	Ligue 1	33	3	3	1	—		36	4
Sochaux	Total		98	4	5	1	2	0	105	5
Lille	2014–15	Ligue 1	31	1	4	1	10	1	45	3
Lille	2015–16	Ligue 1	33	2	7	0	0	0	40	2
Lille	2016–17	Ligue 1	38	1	2	1	2	0	42	2
Lille	Total		102	4	13	2	12	1	127	7
Sevilla	2017–18	La Liga	12	0	5	0	3	0	20	0
Sevilla	2018–19	La Liga	0	0	0	0	2	0	2	0
Sevilla	Total		12	0	5	0	5	0	22	0
Benfica (loan)	2018–19	Primeira Liga	2	0	3	0	2	0	7	0
Benfica B (loan)	2018–19	LigaPro	2	0	—		—		2	0
Espanyol (loan)	2019–20	La Liga	3	0	0	0	4	0	7	0
Nantes	2020–21	Ligue 1	25	0	1	0	1 (Note: Appearance in relegation play-offs)	0	27	0
Nantes	2021–22	Ligue 1	28	0	5	0	–		33	0
Nantes	2022–23	Ligue 1	22	0	5	0	–		27	0
Nantes	Total		75	0	11	0	1	0	87	0
Career total			374	11	44	4	26	1	444	16

=== International ===
As of match played 15 November 2016

Appearances and goals by national team and year
National team	Year	Apps	Goals
France	2016	1	0
Total		1	0

== Honours ==
Benfica

- Primeira Liga: 2018–19

Nantes

- Coupe de France: 2021–22
