= Renato Civelli =

Argentine footballer (born 1983)

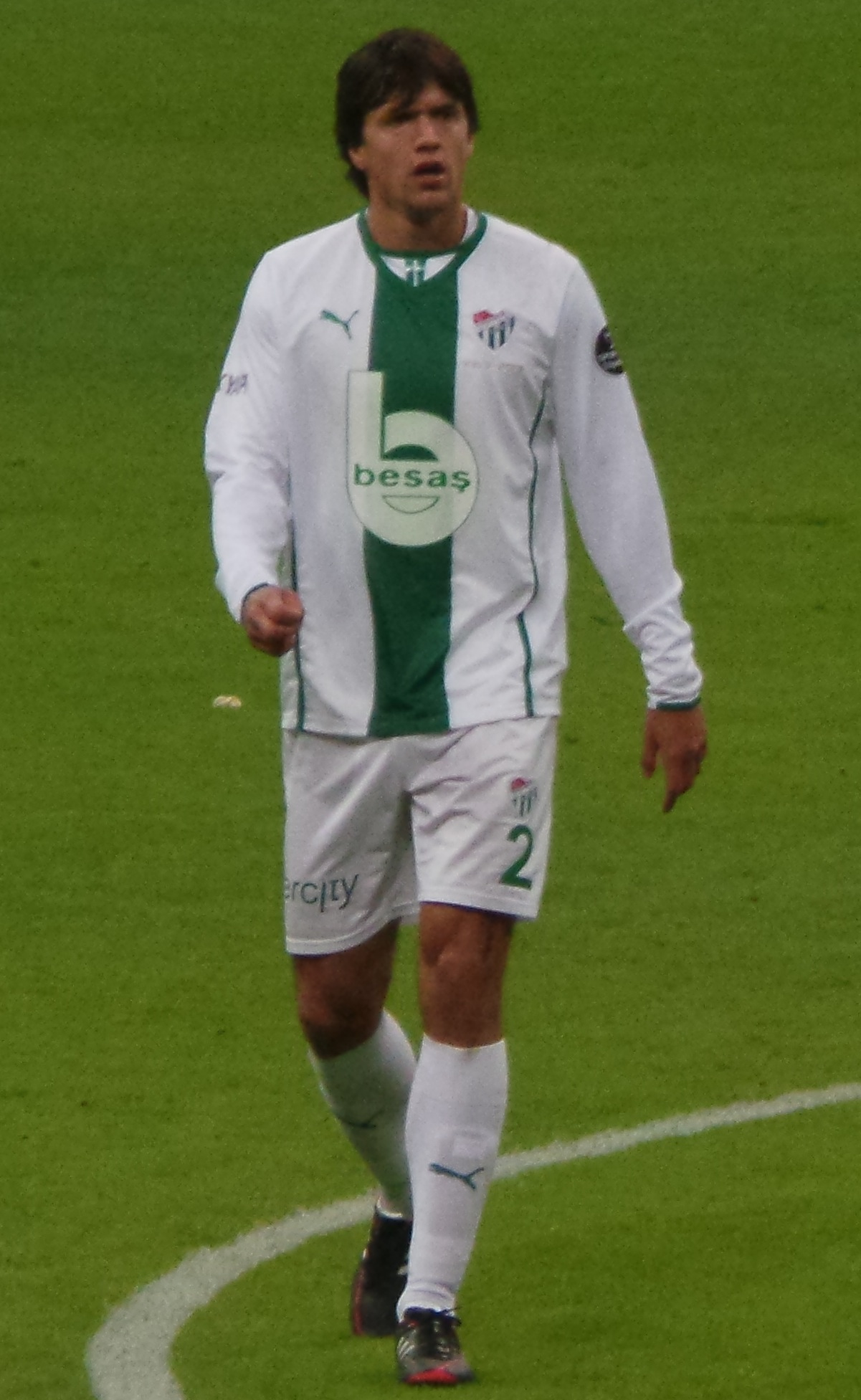
- Civelli with Bursaspor

Personal information
- Date of birth: 14 October 1983 (age 43)
- Place of birth: Pehuajó, Argentina
- Height: 1.93 m (6 ft 4 in)
- Position: Centre-back

Youth career
- Banfield

Senior career*
Years	Team	Apps	(Gls)
2003–2005	Banfield	62	(2)
2006–2009	Marseille	36	(6)
2007–2008	→ Gimnasia LP (loan)	29	(1)
2009–2010	San Lorenzo	11	(1)
2010–2013	Nice	116	(13)
2013–2015	Bursaspor	52	(4)
2015–2017	Lille	45	(1)
2017–2020	Banfield	76	(2)
2020–2021	Huracán	19	(0)
- * Club domestic league appearances and goals

Renato Civelli (born 14 October 1983) is an Argentine retired professional footballer who played as a centre-back.

== Career ==
Civelli was born in Pehuajó. He started his career at Banfield in the Primera Division Argentina. After two years with the club he was signed by Marseille in January 2006, during the European winter transfer window. He returned to Argentina on a one-year loan contract after the 2006–07 season, joining Gimnasia at the start of the 2007 Apertura. From February 2009, due to the Julien Rodriguez's injury, he played as central defender for several matches gaining respect from both manager and supporters.

Without a place in the team and after becoming a free agent, Civelli returned to Argentina to play in San Lorenzo de Almagro during the 2009–10 league after refusing several offers made by English, German, Spanish, Italian and Belgian teams. On 13 January 2010, he agreed a contract with Nice.

On 15 July 2013, Civelli joined Süper Lig club Bursaspor for an undisclosed fee, signing a two-year contract.

He retired in the summer 2021.

== Personal life ==
His younger brother, Luciano, was also a professional footballer, had played alongside Civelli for Banfield in the Argentine Primera División before his retirement.
