= Sofiane Boufal =

Footballer (born 1993)

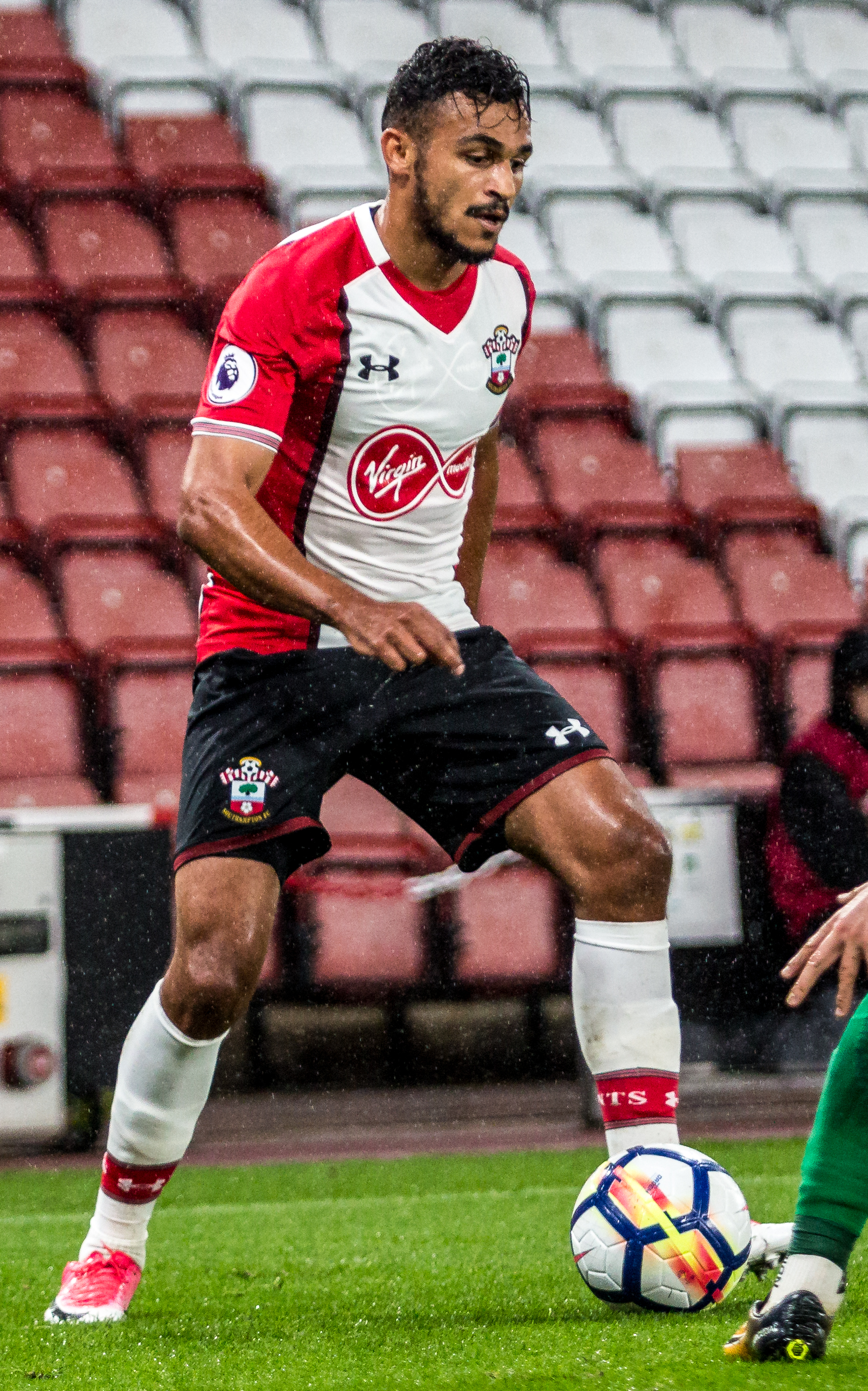
- Boufal with Southampton in 2017

Personal information
- Full name: Sofiane Boufal
- Date of birth: 17 September 1993 (age 33)
- Place of birth: Paris, France
- Height: 1.75 m (5 ft 9 in)
- Positions: Winger; attacking midfielder

Team information
- Current team: Al-Ittihad
- Number: 27

Youth career
- 2005–2012: Angers

Senior career*
Years	Team	Apps	(Gls)
2012–2015	Angers B	29	(5)
2012–2015	Angers	46	(4)
2015–2016	Lille	43	(14)
2016–2020	Southampton	70	(3)
2018–2019	→ Celta (loan)	35	(3)
2020–2023	Angers	56	(13)
2023–2024	Al-Rayyan	11	(3)
2024–2026	Union SG	27	(0)
2026	Le Havre	17	(1)
2026–	Al-Ittihad	0	(0)

International career^{‡}
2016–	Morocco	46	(8)
- * Club domestic league appearances and goals as of 26 September 2026 ‡ National team caps and goals as of 24 January 2024

Sofiane Boufal (Arabic: سفيان بوفال; born 17 September 1993) is a professional footballer who plays as a winger or attacking midfielder for Libyan Premier League club Al-Ittihad. Born in France, he played for the Morocco national team.

== Early life ==
Boufal was born in the 17th arrondissement of Paris, to Moroccan parents. He acquired French nationality on 31 January 2006, through the collective effect of his parents' naturalization. He grew up in Angers.

== Club career ==
=== Angers ===
Boufal came through the Angers youth system, making his debut for the club at the age of 18, replacing Rayan Frikeche in the closing stages of a 1–0 home loss to Istres in August 2012. He made his first ever professional start the next Ligue 2 season, in a 4–2 win away at Istres, becoming a regular that season, making 31 appearances in all competitions. In the 2014–15 season, he helped Angers win promotion to Ligue 1. He racked up a total of 4 goals in 16 appearances in the first half of the season, before attracting interest from Ligue 1 clubs.

=== Lille ===
On 9 January 2015, Boufal transferred to Lille in Ligue 1, instantly making an impression, scoring 3 goals in 14 league games. The next season, he continued to impress, scoring 12 goals in 35 appearances in all competitions and attracted interest from some of the biggest clubs around the world.

=== Southampton ===
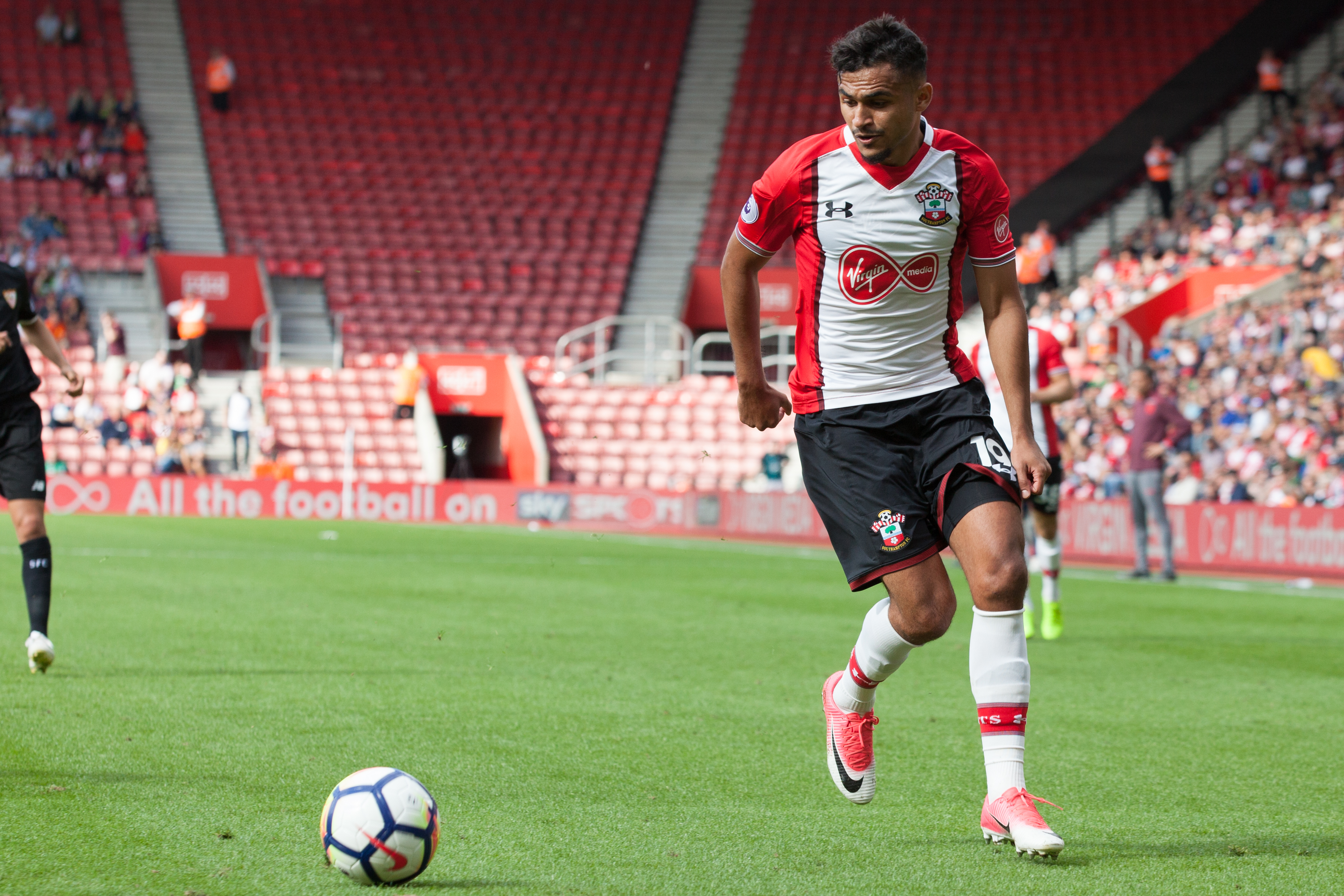
Boufal with Southampton in August 2017

On 29 August 2016, Southampton announced they had signed Boufal on a five-year contract for a club-record undisclosed fee. The fee was reported as £16 million, slightly more than the £15 million paid to Roma for Dani Osvaldo in October 2013.

In the 2016–17 season, Boufal scored only one League Cup goal and one Premier League goal; his strike in Saints' 26 October 2016 1–0 win over Sunderland in the fourth round of the League Cup won Southampton's Goal of the Season award.

On 21 October 2017, Boufal scored a virtuoso 85th-minute goal in a home tie against West Bromwich Albion to lead his team to a 1–0 victory and send them into the top half of the Premier League. Having come on as a substitute in the 80th minute, he gained possession deep within his own half and took the ball past six opposing players before sending it past keeper Ben Foster from just inside the box. This goal was voted the 2017–18 Premier League Goal of the Season.

In July 2018, Boufal joined La Liga side Celta Vigo on loan for the 2018–19 campaign.

After returning to Southampton for the 2019–20 season, he played in 10 of his team's 13 league games before injuring his toe at his home, when he ran into a kitchen table.

=== Return to Angers ===
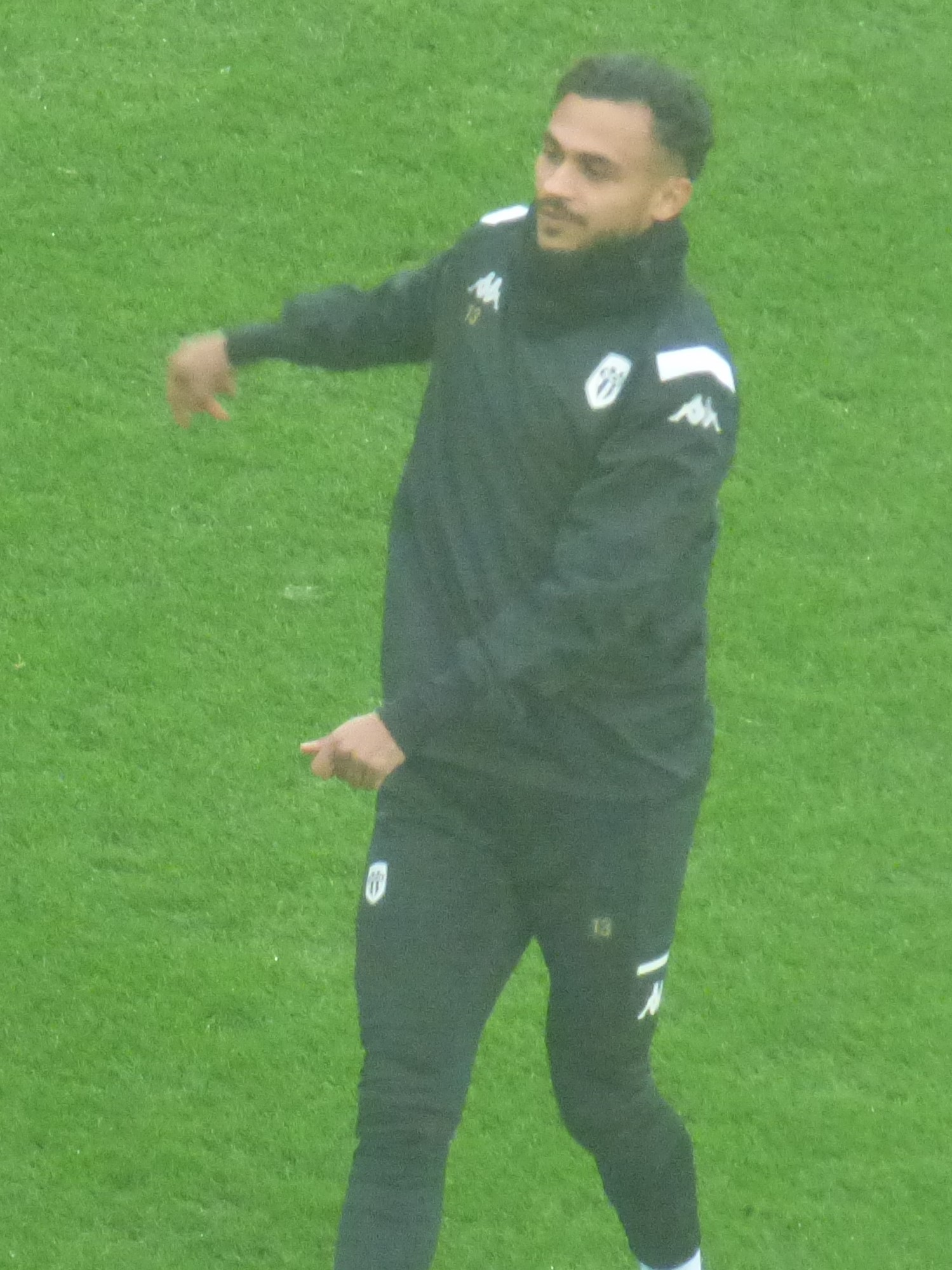
Boufal with Angers in November 2020

On 5 October 2020, Boufal returned to his first club Angers on a free transfer.

=== Al-Rayyan ===
On 31 January 2023, Boufal joined Qatari club Al-Rayyan SC on a three-and-a-half-year contract. Boufal made his debut against Al-Gharafa SC and scored his first goal for the club against Al-Duhail SC.

=== Later career ===
On 3 September 2024, Boufal joined Belgian club Union SG.

He signed with Ligue 1 side Le Havre on 14 January 2026.

On 14 September 2026, Boufal joined Libyan Premier League side Al-Ittihad on a free transfer.

== International career ==
Boufal made his debut for the Morocco national team on 26 March 2016 starting in a 1–0 African Cup of Nations qualification victory against Cape Verde.

Boufal withdrew from Morocco's squad for the 2017 Africa Cup of Nations due to injury. He was also unexpectedly omitted from the final squad for the 2018 FIFA World Cup by coach Hervé Renard.

Boufal represented Morocco at the 2019 Africa Cup of Nations. He was one of two Moroccan players to fail to score in their 4–1 penalty shootout defeat to Benin in the Round of 16. He scored his first international goal in a 4–1 win over Guineau in the 2022 FIFA World Cup qualification.

On 10 November 2022, he was named in Morocco's 26-man squad for the 2022 FIFA World Cup in Qatar. He and his teammates made history and became the first African nation ever to reach the semi-finals of the competition.

== Career statistics ==
=== Club ===
As of match played 17 May 2026

Appearances and goals by club, season and competition
Club	Season	League			National cup (Note: Includes Coupe de France, FA Cup, Belgian Cup)		League cup (Note: Includes Coupe de la Ligue, EFL Cup)		Continental		Other		Total	
Club	Season	Division	Apps	Goals	Apps	Goals	Apps	Goals	Apps	Goals	Apps	Goals	Apps	Goals
Angers B	2012–13	National 3	22	5	—		—		—		—		22	5
Angers B	2013–14	National 3	7	0	—		—		—		—		7	0
Angers B	Total		29	5	—		—		—		—		29	5
Angers	2012–13	Ligue 2	2	0	1	0	0	0	—		—		3	0
Angers	2013–14	Ligue 2	28	0	4	0	0	0	—		—		32	0
Angers	2014–15	Ligue 2	16	4	1	0	2	0	—		—		19	4
Angers	Total		46	4	6	0	2	0	—		—		54	4
Lille	2014–15	Ligue 1	14	3	0	0	2	0	—		—		16	3
Lille	2015–16	Ligue 1	29	11	1	0	5	1	—		—		35	12
Lille	Total		43	14	1	0	7	1	—		—		51	15
Southampton	2016–17	Premier League	24	1	0	0	3	1	2 (Note: Appearances in UEFA Europa League)	0	—		29	2
Southampton	2017–18	Premier League	26	2	3	0	1	0	—		—		30	2
Southampton	2018–19	Premier League	0	0	—		–		—		—		0	0
Southampton	2019–20	Premier League	20	0	3	1	2	0	—		—		25	1
Southampton	Total		70	3	6	1	6	1	2	0	—		84	5
Celta Vigo (loan)	2018–19	La Liga	35	3	0	0	—		—		—		35	3
Angers	2020–21	Ligue 1	14	1	1	0	—		—		—		15	1
Angers	2021–22	Ligue 1	29	8	0	0	—		—		—		29	8
Angers	2022–23	Ligue 1	13	4	0	0	—		—		—		13	4
Angers	Total		56	13	1	0	—		—		—		57	13
Al-Rayyan	2022–23	Qatar Stars League	9	3	1	0	—		—		—		10	3
Al-Rayyan	2023–24	Qatar Stars League	2	0	1	1	3	0	—		—		6	1
Al-Rayyan	Total		11	3	2	1	2	0	—		—		16	4
Union SG	2024–25	Belgian Pro League	18	0	2	0	—		5	0	—		25	0
Union SG	2025–26	Belgian Pro League	9	0	1	0	—		4 (Note: Appearances in UEFA Champions League)	0	1 (Note: Appearance in Belgian Super Cup)	0	15	0
Union SG	Total		27	0	3	0	—		9	0	1	0	40	0
Le Havre	2025–26	Ligue 1	17	1	—		—		—		—		17	1
Career total			334	46	19	2	17	2	10	0	1	0	382	56

=== International ===
As of match played 24 January 2024

Appearances and goals by national team and year
National team	Year	Apps	Goals
Morocco	2016	3	0
Morocco	2017	2	0
Morocco	2018	3	0
Morocco	2019	8	0
Morocco	2020	0	0
Morocco	2021	6	1
Morocco	2022	17	5
Morocco	2023	3	1
Morocco	2024	4	1
Total		46	8

Scores and results list Morocco's goal tally first, score column indicates score after each Boufal goal.

List of international goals scored by Sofiane Boufal
No.	Date	Venue	Opponent	Score	Result	Competition
1	12 October 2021	Prince Moulay Abdellah Stadium, Rabat, Morocco	Guinea	4–1	4–1	2022 FIFA World Cup qualification
2	10 January 2022	Stade Ahmadou Ahidjo, Yaoundé, Cameroon	Ghana	1–0	1–0	2021 Africa Cup of Nations
3	18 January 2022	Stade Ahmadou Ahidjo, Yaoundé, Cameroon	Gabon	1–1	2–2	2021 Africa Cup of Nations
4	30 January 2022	Stade Ahmadou Ahidjo, Yaoundé, Cameroon	Egypt	1–0	1–2 (a.e.t.)	2021 Africa Cup of Nations
5	23 September 2022	RCDE Stadium, Barcelona, Spain	Chile	1–0	2–0	Friendly
6	17 November 2022	Sharjah Stadium, Sharjah, United Arab Emirates	Georgia	3–0	3–0	Friendly
7	25 March 2023	Ibn Batouta Stadium, Tangier, Morocco	Brazil	1–0	2–1	Friendly
8	11 January 2024	Laurent Pokou Stadium, San-Pédro, Ivory Coast	Sierra Leone	2–1	3–1	Friendly

== Honours ==
Lille

- Coupe de la Ligue runner-up: 2015–16

Southampton

- EFL Cup runner-up: 2016–17

Union SG

- Belgian Pro League: 2024–25

Individual

- Prix Marc-Vivien Foé: 2016
- Premier League Goal of the Month: October 2017
- Premier League Goal of the Season: 2017–18
- Goal of the decade at Southampton: 2010–2020

Orders

- Order of the Throne: 2022
