= Pierre Bouby =

French footballer (born 1983)

Personal information
- Date of birth: 17 October 1983 (age 43)
- Place of birth: Vichy, France
- Height: 1.85 m (6 ft 1 in)
- Position: Midfielder

Senior career*
Years	Team	Apps	(Gls)
2000–2002	Lyon	0	(0)
2002–2004	Amiens	0	(0)
2004–2007	Moulins	102	(15)
2007–2009	Croix de Savoie	62	(13)
2009–2011	Evian	55	(10)
2011–2012	Metz	29	(3)
2012–2014	Nîmes	71	(4)
2014–2016	Auxerre	43	(0)
2016	→ Orléans (loan)	14	(0)
2016–2019	Orléans	82	(7)
Total		458	(52)
- * Club domestic league appearances and goals

Pierre Bouby (born 17 October 1983) is a French former professional footballer who played as a midfielder.

== Career ==
Born in Vichy, Bouby started his career with Lyon and joined Amiens in 2002, but did not make a first-team appearance for either club. In 2004, he signed for Championnat de France amateur Group B side Moulins and went on to become a regular starter during a three-year spell at the club, playing more than 100 league matches. He was part of the team that won promotion to the Championnat National in 2005, but relegation back to the CFA followed a year later.

In 2007, Bouby joined CFA Group B outfit Croix de Savoie on a free transfer. He played 30 league games in his first season with the club, scoring five goals as the team won promotion to the National, and the following campaign he netted 8 times in 32 appearances. In June 2009, he signed a new contract with Croix de Savoie. Later the same summer, the club was bought by mineral water company Evian; the new owners changed the club name to Evian Thonon Gaillard F.C. and improvements were made to the playing squad. The team subsequently won promotion to Ligue 2 at the end of the 2009–10 season as National champions and Bouby enjoyed his most prolific goalscoring campaign, netting 9 goals in 32 league matches.

Bouby was again a first-team regular during the first half of the 2010–11 season, but lost his place in the side following the 2–0 home defeat to Dijon on 25 February 2011. He made only two substitute appearances over the remainder of the campaign, and ended the season having played in 23 league matches as Evian secured their second consecutive league title and subsequent promotion, this time to Ligue 1. On 1 June 2011, Bouby signed a three-year contract with Ligue 2 club Metz, and went on to score 2 goals in 15 matches during the first five months of the 2011–12 season.

On 21 June 2019, Bouby announced that he had retired. He continued at US Orléans working for the administrative staff, becoming responsible for communication, marketing, digital and social networks at the club.

Since 2015, he's a frequent participant of the cult radio programme, Les Grosses Têtes
