= Djibril Sidibé (footballer, born 1992) =

French footballer

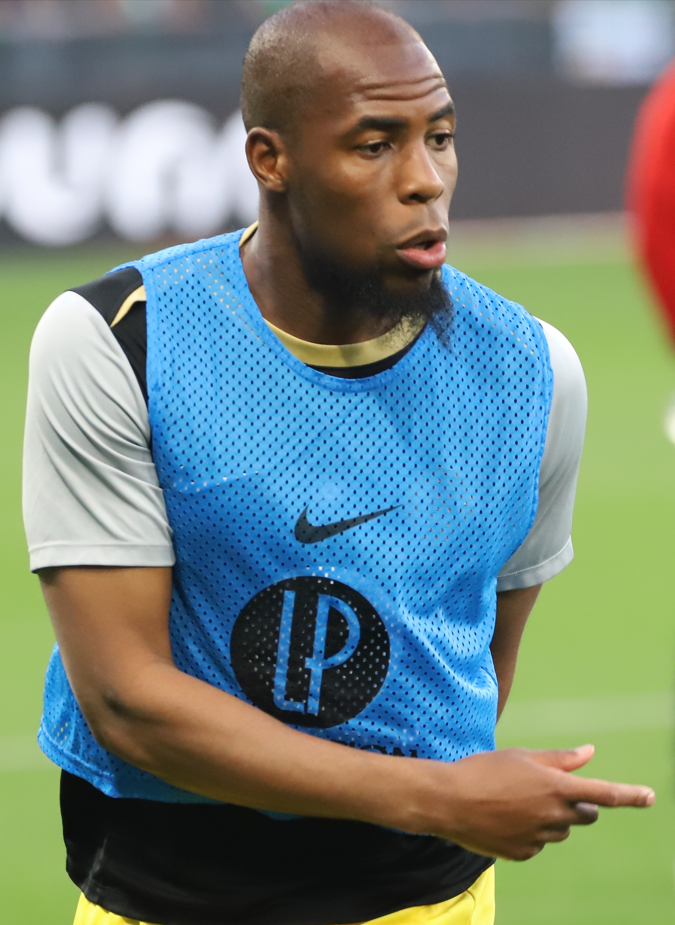
- Sidibé with Toulouse in 2025

Personal information
- Full name: Djibril Sidibé
- Date of birth: 29 July 1992 (age 34)
- Place of birth: Troyes, France
- Height: 1.83 m (6 ft 0 in)
- Position: Defender

Team information
- Current team: Le Mans
- Number: 19

Youth career
- 2000–2010: Troyes

Senior career*
Years	Team	Apps	(Gls)
2010–2012	Troyes	41	(1)
2012–2015	Lille II	6	(1)
2012–2016	Lille	96	(7)
2016–2022	Monaco	129	(4)
2019–2020	→ Everton (loan)	25	(0)
2022–2024	AEK Athens	29	(1)
2024–2026	Toulouse	60	(3)
2026–	Le Mans	5	(0)

International career
2011–2013	France U20	10	(0)
2013	France U21	1	(0)
2016–2018	France	18	(1)
Medal record
Men's football
Representing France
FIFA World Cup
Winner	2018 Russia
- * Club domestic league appearances and goals as of 17:25, 25 October 2026 (UTC)

Djibril Sidibé (born 29 July 1992) is a French professional footballer who plays as a defender for Ligue 1 club Le Mans.

== Club career ==
=== Early career ===
Sidibé plays as a full-back, but can also be utilized in midfield. He began his career at his hometown club Troyes in 2000 at the age of eight. Sidibé made his club debut during the 2009–10 season while the club was playing in the Championnat National, the third division of French football. He made his professional debut on 17 September 2010 in a league match against Grenoble.

=== Lille ===
After helping earn Troyes promotion to Ligue 1, the 19-year-old signed for Lille in July 2012, as cover for Mathieu Debuchy. Sidibé made his debut for Lille on 25 August 2012 against OGC Nice, the start was his first appearance in Ligue 1 and he marked it with a goal, scoring a 59' minute equalizer in a 2–2 draw. In Lille's 2012–13 UEFA Champions League group stage matchday 5 game against BATE Borisov in Minsk on 20 November, Sidibé helped Lille avenge their 3–1 matchday 1 home defeat against BATE Borisov by scoring from a long angled strike in the first half. Sidibé was sent off in the second half, for a second bookable offense, but Lille held on for a 2–0 victory, securing their only points of their 2012–13 UEFA Champions League group stage campaign.

Sidibé scored Lille's equalizing goal against Paris Saint-Germain in the 2016 Coupe de la Ligue Final; however PSG won the match 2–1.

=== Monaco ===
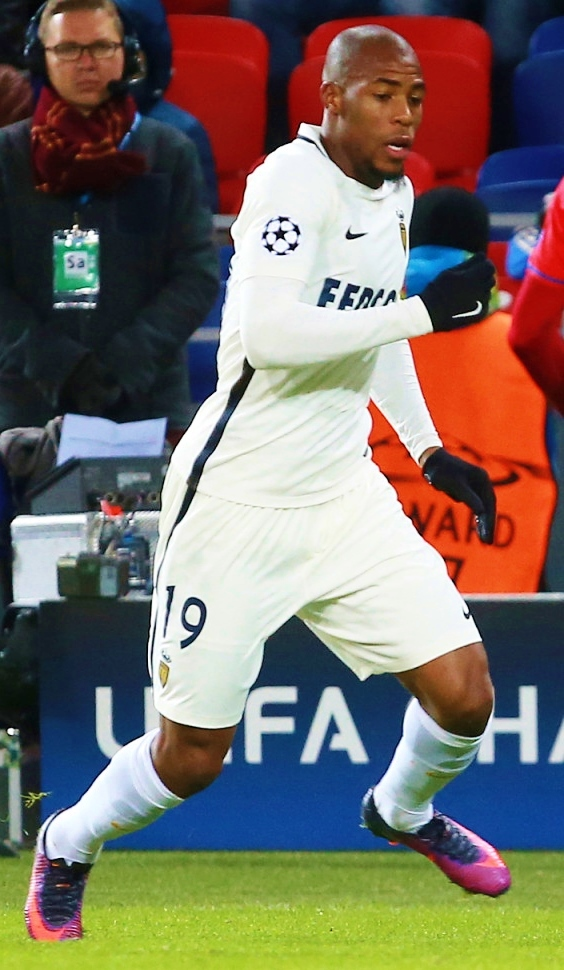
Sidibé playing for Monaco in 2016

On 8 July 2016, Sidibé joined Monaco on a five-year deal. On 22 November, Sidibé headed home Benjamin Mendy's cross for Monaco's first goal in the 48th minute and provided the assist for Thomas Lemar in the 53rd minute to enable Monaco to defeat Tottenham Hotspur 2–1 at home in the 2016–17 UEFA Champions League group stage Group E matchday 5 match and ensure that Monaco would finish on top of Group E at the conclusion of the group matches on 7 December.

In his first season with Monaco, Sidibé played an integral role as the club won the Ligue 1 title for the first time in 17 years and he was named to the UNFP Ligue 1 Team of the Year.

==== Loan to Everton ====
On 7 August 2019, Sidibé joined Premier League side Everton on an initial season-long loan; the deal included an option to make the move permanent at the end of the loan.

=== AEK Athens ===
On 9 September 2022, Sidibé joined Greek Super League side AEK Athens on a two-year deal.

=== Toulouse FC ===
On 2 August 2024, Sidibé signed a one year, with a second optional year, deal with Ligue 1 side Toulouse. In June 2025, he extended his contract with Toulouse for one more year.

On 30 June 2026, his contract with Toulouse ended, and he became a free agent.

=== Le Mans FC ===
On 18 August 2026, Sidibé signed a two-year contract with Le Mans, with an option to extend his contract for an additional year. Later that month, on 30 August, he was sent off just 43 seconds after coming on as a substitute on his debut, in a 3–2 away defeat to Rennes.

== International career ==
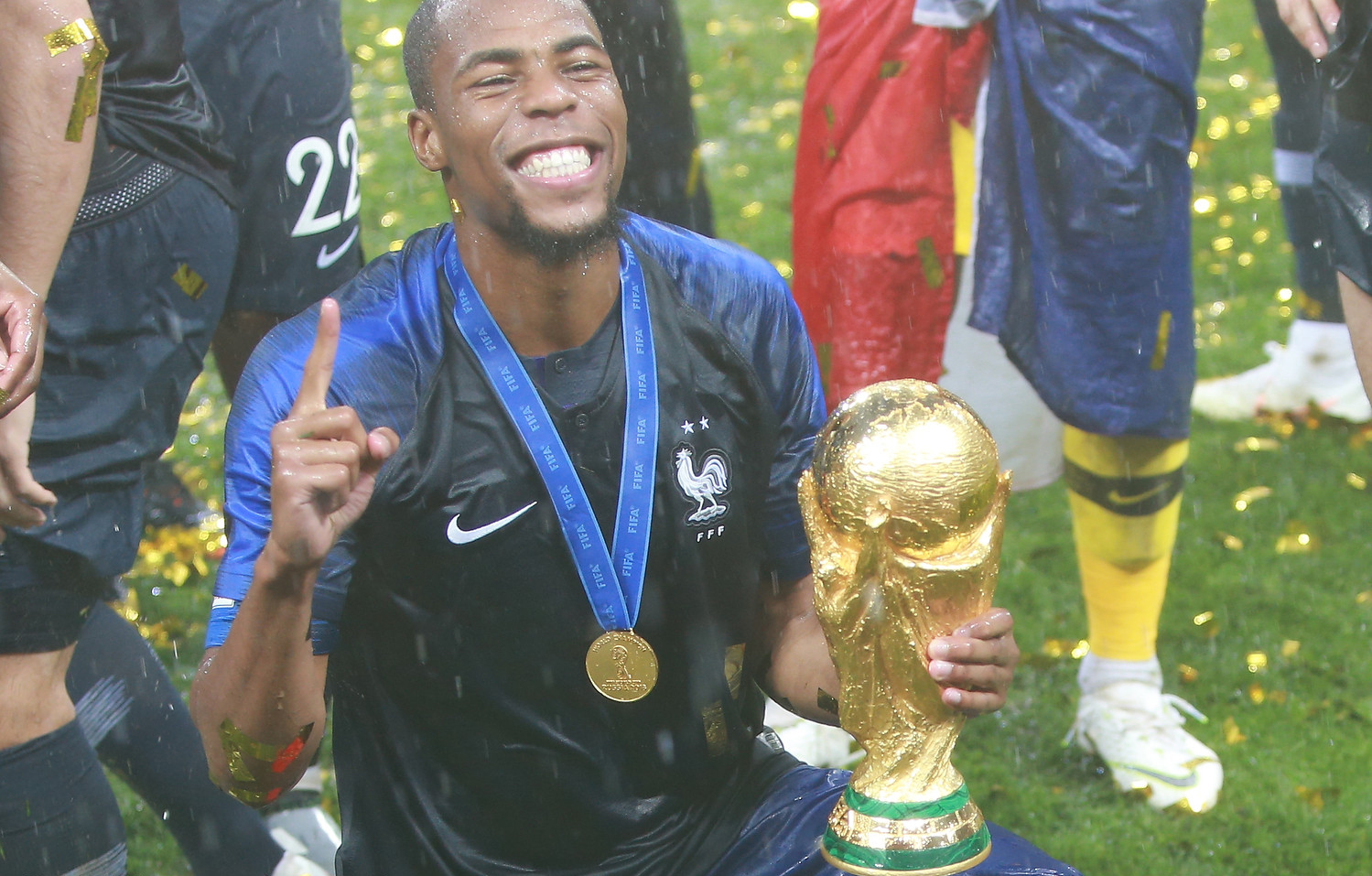
Sidibé holding the 2018 FIFA World Cup trophy

Sidibé was on stand by for France's UEFA Euro 2016 squad.

On 25 August 2016, Sidibé was called up to the senior squad for the first time for a friendly against Italy and a 2018 FIFA World Cup qualification against Belarus. He made his debut on 1 September against the former at the Stadio San Nicola playing the whole match in a 3–1 victory.

Sidibé scored his first goal for France in their 3–2 friendly victory over England on 13 June 2017.

On 17 May 2018, he was called up to the 23-man French squad for the 2018 FIFA World Cup in Russia, which his country ended up winning.

== Personal life ==
Sidibé is a Muslim of Malian descent.

== Career statistics ==
=== Club ===
As of match played 25 October 2026

Appearances and goals by club, season and competition
Club	Season	League			National cup (Note: Includes Coupe de France, FA Cup, Greek Cup)		League cup (Note: Includes Coupe de la Ligue, EFL Cup)		Europe		Other		Total	
Club	Season	Division	Apps	Goals	Apps	Goals	Apps	Goals	Apps	Goals	Apps	Goals	Apps	Goals
Troyes	2009–10	Championnat National	1	0	0	0	0	0	—		—		1	0
Troyes	2010–11	Ligue 2	6	0	0	0	0	0	—		—		6	0
Troyes	2011–12	Ligue 2	34	1	3	0	1	0	—		—		38	1
Troyes	Total		41	1	3	0	1	0	—		—		45	1
Lille II	2012–13	CFA	3	0	—		—		—		—		3	0
Lille II	2013–14	CFA	1	0	—		—		—		—		1	0
Lille II	2014–15	CFA	2	1	—		—		—		—		2	1
Lille II	Total		6	1	—		—		—		—		6	1
Lille	2012–13	Ligue 1	14	1	2	0	1	1	3 (Note: Appearances in UEFA Champions League)	1	—		20	3
Lille	2013–14	Ligue 1	20	0	3	0	1	0	—		—		24	0
Lille	2014–15	Ligue 1	25	2	1	0	3	0	3 (Note: One appearance in UEFA Champions League, two appearances in UEFA Europa League)	0	—		32	2
Lille	2015–16	Ligue 1	37	4	2	0	4	2	—		—		43	6
Lille	Total		96	7	8	0	9	3	6	1	—		119	11
Monaco	2016–17	Ligue 1	29	2	2	0	4	0	12	1	—		47	3
Monaco	2017–18	Ligue 1	27	2	1	0	3	0	3	0	1 (Note: Appearance in Trophée des Champions)	1	35	3
Monaco	2018–19	Ligue 1	26	0	1	0	1	0	4	0	0	0	32	0
Monaco	2020–21	Ligue 1	30	0	4	0	—		—		—		34	0
Monaco	2021–22	Ligue 1	17	0	3	0	—		6 (Note: Three appearances in UEFA Champions League, three appearances in UEFA Europa League)	0	—		26	0
Monaco	Total		129	4	11	0	8	0	25	1	1	1	174	6
Everton (loan)	2019–20	Premier League	25	0	1	0	2	0	—		—		28	0
AEK Athens	2022–23	Super League Greece	12	0	5	0	—		—		—		17	0
AEK Athens	2023–24	Super League Greece	17	1	2	0	—		6 (Note: Two appearances in UEFA Champions League, four appearances and one goal in UEFA Europa League)	1	—		25	2
AEK Athens	Total		29	1	7	0	—		6	1	—		42	2
Toulouse	2024–25	Ligue 1	28	0	0	0	—		—		—		28	0
Toulouse	2025–26	Ligue 1	33	3	3	0	—		—		—		36	3
Toulouse	Total		61	3	3	0	—		—		—		64	3
Le Mans	2026–27	Ligue 1	5	0	0	0	—		—		—		5	0
Career total			391	17	33	0	20	3	37	3	1	1	482	24

=== International ===
Appearances and goals by national team and year
National team	Year	Apps	Goals
France	2016	6	0
France	2017	8	1
France	2018	4	0
Total		18	1

France score listed first, score column indicates score after each Sidibé goal.

List of international goals scored by Djibril Sidibé
No.	Date	Venue	Cap	Opponent	Score	Result	Competition
1	13 June 2017	Stade de France, Saint-Denis, France	10	England	2–1	3–2	Friendly

== Honours ==
Monaco

- Ligue 1: 2016–17

AEK Athens

- Super League Greece: 2022–23
- Greek Cup: 2022–23

France

- FIFA World Cup: 2018

Individual

- UNFP Ligue 1 Team of the Year: 2016–17

Orders

- Knight of the Legion of Honour: 2018
