= Mounir Obbadi =

Footballer (born 1983)

Personal information
- Date of birth: 4 April 1983 (age 43)
- Place of birth: Meulan-en-Yvelines, France
- Height: 1.72 m (5 ft 8 in)
- Position: Attacking midfielder

Youth career
- 2001: Chanteloup-les-Vignes

Senior career*
Years	Team	Apps	(Gls)
2001–2004	Paris Saint-Germain B	47	(12)
2004	→ Angers (loan)	11	(1)
2004–2006	Angers	62	(15)
2006–2013	Troyes	167	(19)
2007	→ Angers (loan)	14	(3)
2013–2015	Monaco	48	(3)
2014–2015	→ Hellas Verona (loan)	22	(1)
2015–2017	Lille	35	(1)
2017	Nice	6	(0)
2017–2018	Raja CA	18	(0)
2018–2019	Laval	20	(1)
2019–2020	AS Poissy	14	(0)
2020–2021	Racing CFF	0	(0)
Total		464	(56)

International career
2005–2017	Morocco	21	(0)
- * Club domestic league appearances and goals

Mounir Obbadi (born 4 April 1983) is a former professional footballer who played as an attacking midfielder. Born in France, he played for the Morocco national team at international level, making 21 appearances between 2005 and 2017.

== Career ==
Obbadi started his professional career at Paris Saint-Germain, although he never played a first team game. After a years loan spell at Angers he made the switch permanent in 2005. In January 2007, he joined Ligue 2 club Troyes, before being loaned back to Angers that season. After ESTAC were relegated, he broke into their first team. As a playmaker, he was one of the most influent players on the field, and helped the club to climb from Championnat National (French third tier) to Ligue 1 over three seasons (2010 to 2012). He signed for Ligue 2 team Monaco in January 2013 and secured promotion at the end of the season, playing in a box-to-box role. On 15 July 2014, he was loaned out to Serie A side Hellas Verona ahead of the 2014–15 season.

Obbadi joined Ligue 1 club Lille in July 2015, with a two-year contract.

After one season at Laval, Obbadi joined AS Poissy on 25 June 2019.
