= List of French football transfers summer 2016 =

This is a list of French football transfers for the 2016 summer transfer window. Only moves featuring Ligue 1 or Ligue 2 are listed.

== Ligue 1 ==
Note: Flags indicate national team as has been defined under FIFA eligibility rules. Players may hold more than one non-FIFA nationality.

=== Angers SCO ===
In:

No.	Pos.	Nation	Player
4	DF	CRO	Mateo Pavlović (from (Germany) Werder Bremen)
7	FW	CMR	Karl Toko Ekambi (from (France) Sochaux)
9	FW	SEN	Famara Diedhiou (from (France) Sochaux, previously on loan at (France) Clermont Foot)
11	FW	NGA	Dickson Nwakaeme (from free agent)
12	FW	FRA	Yoane Wissa (from (France) Châteauroux)
16	GK	FRA	Mathieu Michel (from (France) Nîmes)
18	MF	FRA	Baptiste Santamaria (from (France) Tours)
20	MF	FRA	Flavien Tait (from (France) Châteauroux)
21	DF	FRA	Pablo Martinez (from (France) Gazélec Ajaccio)
23	MF	TUN	Jamel Saihi (from (France) Montpellier)
26	MF	ALG	Mehdi Jean Tahrat (from (France) Red Star 93)

Out:

No.	Pos.	Nation	Player
2	DF	FRA	Gaël Angoula (to (France) Nîmes)
3	DF	CGO	Arnold Bouka Moutou (to (France) Dijon)
7	MF	FRA	Olivier Auriac (retired)
11	FW	FRA	Slimane Sissoko (to (France) Nîmes)
12	FW	CMR	Jean-Pierre Nsamé (to (Switzerland) Servette Genève)
20	MF	FRA	Charles Diers (retired)
22	FW	SUI	Goran Karanović (loaned to (France) Sochaux)
23	MF	FRA	Yohann Eudeline (retired)
26	MF	CMR	Guy Ngosso (to (France) Amiens)
28	MF	MAR	Romain Saïss (to (England) Wolverhampton Wanderers)
—	MF	ARG	Diego Gómez (to (France) Cholet)
—	MF	BRA	Pessalli (released)

=== SC Bastia ===
In:

No.	Pos.	Nation	Player
4	DF	MAR	Abdelhamid El Kaoutari (on loan from (Italy) Palermo, previously on loan at (France) Stade Reims)
6	MF	FRA	Allan Saint-Maximin (on loan from Monaco, previously on loan at (Germany) Hannover 96)
7	MF	CPV	Jerson Cabral (from (Netherlands) Twente)
11	FW	FRA	Lenny Nangis (on loan from (France) Lille)
13	FW	CGO	Thievy Bifouma (from (Spain) Espanyol, previously on loan at (France) Stade Reims)
20	DF	SWE	Pierre Bengtsson (on loan from (Germany) Mainz 05)
22	MF	FRA	Farid Boulaya (from (France) Clermont)
30	GK	FRA	Paul Charruau (from (France) Valenciennes)

Out:

No.	Pos.	Nation	Player
1	GK	DEN	Jesper Hansen (to (Denmark) Lyngby)
6	MF	FRA	Seko Fofana (loan return to (England) Manchester City, later sold to (Italy) Udinese)
7	MF	TOG	Floyd Ayité (to (England) Fulham)
15	MF	FRA	Julian Palmieri (to (France) Lille)
25	FW	GUI	François Kamano (to (France) Bordeaux)

=== FC Girondins de Bordeaux ===
In:

No.	Pos.	Nation	Player
7	FW	FRA	Jérémy Ménez (from (Italy) Milan)
11	FW	GUI	François Kamano (from (France) Bastia)
14	MF	FRA	Jérémy Toulalan (from Monaco)
20	DF	FRA	Youssouf Sabaly (on loan from (France) Paris Saint-Germain, previously on loan at (France) Nantes)

Out:

No.	Pos.	Nation	Player
6	DF	SEN	Lamine Sané (to (Germany) Werder Bremen)
11	MF	FRA	Clément Chantôme (to (France) Rennes)
21	DF	FRA	Cédric Yambéré (on loan to (Russia) Anzhi Makhachkala)

=== SM Caen ===
In:

No.	Pos.	Nation	Player
4	MF	CIV	Ismaël Diomandé (from (France) Saint-Étienne, previously on loan)
10	MF	FRA	Steed Malbranque (from (France) Lyon)
12	FW	FRA	Ronny Rodelin (from (France) Lille, previously on loan)
23	DF	FRA	Mouhamadou Dabo (from (France) Troyes)
—	FW	CRO	Ivan Santini (from (Belgium) Standard Liège)

Out:

No.	Pos.	Nation	Player
12	MF	FRA	Dennis Appiah (to (Belgium) Anderlecht)

=== Dijon FCO ===
In:

No.	Pos.	Nation	Player
1	GK	FRA	Benjamin Leroy (from (France) Evian)
13	MF	FRA	Marvin Martin (on loan from (France) Lille)
15	MF	FRA	Florent Balmont (from (France) Lille)
21	DF	FRA	Yunis Abdelhamid (from (France) Valenciennes)
25	DF	CGO	Arnold Bouka Moutou (from (France) Angers)
26	DF	MAR	Fouad Chafik (from (France) Laval)
29	MF	FRA	Dylan Bahamboula (from Monaco, previously on loan to (France) Paris)

Out:

No.	Pos.	Nation	Player
6	DF	FRA	Christopher Jullien (loan return to (Germany) SC Freiburg)
19	FW	SEN	Mamadou Thiam (on loan to (France) Clermont Foot)
—	MF	FRA	Arnaud Souquet (to (France) Nice)

=== En Avant de Guingamp ===
In:

No.	Pos.	Nation	Player
1	GK	SWE	Karl-Johan Johnsson (from (Denmark) Randers)
2	DF	COD	Jordan Ikoko (from (France) Paris Saint-Germain, previously on loan at (France) Lens)
8	MF	FRA	Lucas Déaux (from (Belgium) Gent)
9	FW	FRA	Alexandre Mendy (from (France) Nice)
11	FW	FRA	Sloan Privat (from (Belgium) Gent, previously on loan)
17	MF	FRA	Étienne Didot (from (France) Toulouse)
30	GK	FRA	Romain Salin (from (Portugal) Marítimo)

Out:

No.	Pos.	Nation	Player
1	GK	DEN	Jonas Lössl (to (Germany) Mainz 05)
13	MF	SEN	Younousse Sankharé (to (France) Lille)
28	FW	TUR	Mevlüt Erdinç (loan return to (Germany) Hannover 96, later loan to (France) Metz)

=== Lille OSC ===
In:

No.	Pos.	Nation	Player
4	MF	SEN	Younousse Sankharé (from (France) Guingamp)
12	FW	FRA	Nicolas de Préville (from (France) Stade Reims)
13	DF	ZAM	Stoppila Sunzu (from (China) Shanghai Greenland Shenhua, previously on loan)
15	MF	FRA	Julian Palmieri (from (France) Bastia)
39	FW	POR	Éder (from (Wales) Swansea City, previously on loan)
—	DF	HAI	Carlens Arcus (from (France) Troyes)
—	MF	POR	Alexis Araujo (loan return from (France) Boulogne)
—	FW	CGO	Kévin Koubemba (loan return from (France) Brest)

Out:

No.	Pos.	Nation	Player
4	MF	FRA	Florent Balmont (to (France) Dijon)
7	MF	MAR	Sofiane Boufal (to (England) Southampton)
10	MF	FRA	Marvin Martin (on loan to (France) Dijon)
15	FW	FRA	Lenny Nangis (on loan to (France) Bastia)
16	GK	MTQ	Steeve Elana (to (France) Gazélec Ajaccio)
19	DF	FRA	Djibril Sidibé (to Monaco)
27	FW	BEL	Baptiste Guillaume (on loan to (France) Strasbourg)
28	DF	FRA	Benjamin Pavard (to (Germany) VfB Stuttgart)
—	DF	FRA	Julian Jeanvier (to (France) Stade Reims, previously on loan at (France) Red Star)
—	MF	POR	Alexis Araujo (on loan to (France) Dunkerque, previously on loan at (France) Boulogne)
—	MF	FRA	Nolan Mbemba (to (Portugal) Vitória de Guimarães)
—	MF	FRA	Soualiho Meïté (on loan to (Belgium) Zulte Waregem)
—	MF	BOL	Ricardo Roman (on loan to (France) Les Herbiers)
—	FW	SUI	Michael Frey (to (Switzerland) Young Boys, previously on loan at (Switzerland) Luzern)
—	FW	FRA	Serhou Guirassy (to (Germany) 1. FC Köln)
—	FW	CGO	Kévin Koubemba (to (Belgium) Sint-Truiden, previously on loan at (France) Brest)
—	FW	FRA	Ronny Rodelin (to (France) SM Caen, previously on loan)
—	FW	CMR	Didier Lamkel Ze (to (France) Chamois Niort)

=== FC Lorient ===
In:

No.	Pos.	Nation	Player
2	DF	FRA	Lindsay Rose (from (France) Lyon, previously on loan)
8	MF	POR	Cafú (from (Portugal) Vitória de Guimarães)
10	MF	FRA	Sylvain Marveaux (from (England) Newcastle United)
11	DF	COM	Faïz Selemani (from (France) Chamois Niortais)
16	GK	FRA	Paul Delecroix (from (France) Chamois Niortais)

Out:

No.	Pos.	Nation	Player
7	MF	GAB	Didier Ibrahim N'Dong (to (England) Sunderland)
8	MF	FRA	Yann Jouffre (to (France) Metz)
13	MF	FRA	Rafidine Abdullah (to (Spain) Cádiz)
14	DF	POR	Raphaël Guerreiro (to (Germany) Borussia Dortmund)

=== Olympique Lyonnais ===
In:

No.	Pos.	Nation	Player
31	MF	POL	Maciej Rybus (from (Russia) Terek Grozny)
3	DF	CMR	Nicolas Nkoulou (from (France) Marseille)
4	DF	ARG	Emanuel Mammana (from (Argentina) River Plate)

Out:

No.	Pos.	Nation	Player
3	DF	CMR	Henri Bedimo (to (France) Marseille)
4	DF	BFA	Bakary Koné (to (Spain) Málaga)
17	MF	FRA	Steed Malbranque (to (France) SM Caen)
23	DF	FRA	Samuel Umtiti (to (Spain) Barcelona)
—	DF	FRA	Lindsay Rose (to (France) Lorient, previously on loan)

=== Olympique de Marseille ===
In:

No.	Pos.	Nation	Player
2	DF	JPN	Hiroki Sakai (from (Germany) Hannover 96)
3	DF	BRA	Dória (loan return from (Spain) Granada)
7	MF	FRA	Rémy Cabella (from (England) Newcastle United, previously on loan)
12	DF	CMR	Henri Bedimo (from (France) Lyon)
18	FW	FRA	Bafétimbi Gomis (on loan from (Wales) Swansea City)
20	FW	TUN	Saîf-Eddine Khaoui (from (France) Tours)
22	MF	BEL	Aaron Leya Iseka (on loan from (Belgium) Anderlecht)
23	MF	FRA	Zinédine Machach (on loan from (France) Toulouse)
26	MF	FRA	Florian Thauvin (on loan from (England) Newcastle United)
—	FW	CMR	Clinton N'Jie (on loan from (England) Tottenham Hotspur)

Out:

No.	Pos.	Nation	Player
2	DF	ESP	Javier Manquillo (loan return to (Spain) Atlético Madrid)
3	DF	CMR	Nicolas Nkoulou (to (France) Lyon)
7	MF	ARG	Lucas Ocampos (on loan to (Italy) Genoa)
14	MF	FRA	Georges-Kévin Nkoudou (to (England) Tottenham Hotspur)
15	DF	FRA	Stéphane Sparagna (on loan to (France) Auxerre)
19	MF	MAR	Abdelaziz Barrada (to (United Arab Emirates) Al-Nasr)
22	FW	BEL	Michy Batshuayi (to (England) Chelsea)
23	DF	FRA	Benjamin Mendy (to Monaco)
26	DF	CIV	Brice Dja Djédjé (to (England) Watford)
30	GK	FRA	Steve Mandanda (to (England) Crystal Palace)
—	MF	FRA	Bilal Boutobba (to (Spain) Sevilla Atlético)
—	MF	GAB	Mario Lemina (to (Italy) Juventus, previously on loan)

=== FC Metz ===
In:

No.	Pos.	Nation	Player
6	DF	FRA	Simon Falette (from (France) Brest)
8	MF	FRA	Yann Jouffre (from (France) Lorient)
9	FW	TUR	Mevlüt Erdinç (on loan from (Germany) Hannover 96, previously on loan at (France) Guingamp)
11	FW	FRA	Opa Nguette (from (France) Valenciennes)
13	DF	FRA	Franck Signorino (from (France) Stade Reims)
16	GK	JPN	Eiji Kawashima (from (Scotland) Dundee United)
19	MF	FRA	Florent Mollet (from (France) Créteil)
32	DF	CMR	Benoît Assou-Ekotto (from (France) Saint-Étienne)

Out:

No.	Pos.	Nation	Player
11	MF	FRA	Samy Kehli (to (Belgium) Roeselare)
15	DF	FRA	Romain Métanire (to (Belgium) Kortrijk)
23	MF	FRA	Yeni Ngbakoto (to (England) QPR)
27	DF	ARG	José Luis Palomino (to (Bulgaria) Ludogorets Razgrad)

=== AS Monaco ===
In:

No.	Pos.	Nation	Player
9	FW	COL	Radamel Falcao (loan return from (England) Chelsea)
16	GK	ITA	Morgan De Sanctis (from (Italy) Roma)
19	DF	FRA	Djibril Sidibé (from (France) Lille)
23	DF	FRA	Benjamin Mendy (from (France) Marseille)
25	DF	POL	Kamil Glik (from (Italy) Torino)
—	MF	MAR	Youssef Aït Bennasser (from (France) Nancy)

Out:

No.	Pos.	Nation	Player
6	DF	POR	Ricardo Carvalho (released)
9	FW	BRA	Vágner Love (to (Turkey) Alanyaspor)
12	MF	FRA	Farès Bahlouli (on loan to (Belgium) Standard Liège)
16	GK	FRA	Paul Nardi (on loan to (France) Stade Rennais)
17	FW	POR	Ivan Cavaleiro (to (England) Wolverhampton Wanderers)
19	FW	CIV	Lacina Traoré (on loan to (Russia) CSKA Moscow)
21	DF	NGA	Elderson Echiéjilé (on loan to (Belgium) Standard Liége)
28	MF	FRA	Jérémy Toulalan (to (France) Bordeaux)
32	DF	COD	Marcel Tisserand (to (Germany) FC Ingolstadt 04, previously on loan at (France) Toulouse)
34	DF	FRA	Raphaël Diarra (on loan to (Belgium) Cercle Brugge)
—	MF	FRA	Sébastien Amoros (to (England) Port Vale)
—	MF	FRA	Dylan Bahamboula (to (France) Dijon, previously on loan to (France) Paris)
—	MF	POR	Gil Bastião Dias (loan to (Portugal) Rio Ave, previously on loan to (Portugal) Varzim)
—	MF	FRA	Jonathan Mexique (on loan to (France) Red Star)
—	MF	CGO	Delvin N'Dinga (to (Russia) Lokomotiv Moscow, previously on loan)
—	MF	FRA	Jessy Pi (to (France) Toulouse, previously on loan at (France) Troyes)
—	MF	FRA	Allan Saint-Maximin (on loan to (France) Bastia, previously on loan at (Germany) Hannover 96)
—	FW	FRA	Ilyes Chaïbi (on loan to (France) Ajaccio)
—	FW	GUI	Tafsir Chérif (on loan to (Portugal) Rio Ave)
—	FW	CMR	Edgar Salli (to (Germany) 1. FC Nürnberg, previously on loan to (Switzerland) St. Gallen)

=== Montpellier HSC ===
In:

No.	Pos.	Nation	Player
5	MF	MLI	Yacouba Sylla (on loan from (France) Rennes)
15	FW	BEN	Steve Mounié (on loan return from (France) Nîmes)
18	DF	FRA	Nicolas Saint-Ruf (on loan return from (France) Orléans)
20	DF	BEL	Anthony Vanden Borre (on loan from (Belgium) Anderlecht)
22	MF	FRA	Killian Sanson (from (France) Évian TG)

Out:

No.	Pos.	Nation	Player
—	MF	FRA	Jonas Martin (to (Spain) Real Betis)
—	MF	FRA	Bryan Dabo (to (France) Saint-Étienne)
—	MF	COM	Djamel Bakar (to (Belgium) Charleroi)
—	FW	PER	Jean Deza (to (Bulgaria) Levski Sofia)
—	MF	FRA	Anthony Ribelin (to (France) Stade Rennais)
—	MF	TUN	Jamel Saihi (to (France) Angers)
—	DF	ALG	Ramy Bensebaini (loan return at (Algeria) Paradou, later sold to (France) Stade Rennais)
—	FW	MLI	Mustapha Yatabaré (loan return at (Turkey) Trabzonspor, later sold to (Turkey) Karabükspor)
—	MF	SUI	Sébastien Wüthrich (to (Switzerland) Aarau)
—	FW	FRA	Quentin Cornette (to (France) Amiens)
—	FW	FRA	Florian Sotoca (to (France) Grenoble)

=== AS Nancy ===
In:

No.	Pos.	Nation	Player
1	GK	BLR	Syarhey Chernik (from (Belarus) FC BATE Borisov)
6	MF	MAR	Youssef Aït Bennasser (On loan from Monaco previously at (France) Nancy)
8	DF	FRA	Vincent Marchetti (from (France) AC Ajaccio)
12	FW	FRA	Christophe Mandanne (from (United Arab Emirates) Al-Fujairah)
13	MF	CIV	Serge N'Guessan (from (Ivory Coast) AFAD Djékanou)
23	FW	FRA	Anthony Koura (from (France) Nîmes)

Out:

No.	Pos.	Nation	Player
6	MF	MAR	Youssef Aït Bennasser (to Monaco)
—	GK	FRA	Quentin Beunardeau (to (Belgium) Tubize, previously on loan)
—	MF	FRA	Arnaud Lusamba (to (France) Nice)

=== FC Nantes ===
In:

No.	Pos.	Nation	Player
2	FW	VEN	Fernando Aristeguieta (loan return from (France) Red Star)
3	DF	BRA	Diego Carlos (from (Portugal) Estoril)
6	DF	BRA	Lucas Lima (from (Portugal) Arouca)
11	MF	SWE	Alexander Kačaniklić (from (England) Fulham)
18	FW	POL	Mariusz Stępiński (from (Poland) Ruch Chorzów)
23	MF	DEN	Nicolaj Thomsen (from (Denmark) Aalborg BK)

Out:

No.	Pos.	Nation	Player
—	DF	ALB	Lorik Cana (retired)
—	FW	ISL	Kolbeinn Sigþórsson (on loan at (Turkey) Galatasaray)
—	MF	ALB	Ermir Lenjani (loan return to (France) Rennes)
—	DF	FRA	Youssouf Sabaly (loan return to (France) Paris Saint-Germain, later loaned to (France) Bordeaux)
—	MF	USA	Alejandro Bedoya (to (United States) Philadelphia Union)
—	MF	MLI	Birama Touré (to (Belgium) Standard Liège)
—	FW	MTQ	Johan Audel (to (Israel) Beitar Jerusalem)
—	MF	SEN	Rémi Gomis (to (Switzerland) Wil)

=== OGC Nice ===
In:

No.	Pos.	Nation	Player
2	MF	FRA	Arnaud Souquet (from (France) Dijon)
5	MF	MAR	Younès Belhanda (on loan from (Ukraine) Dynamo Kyiv)
8	MF	FRA	Arnaud Lusamba (from (France) Nancy)
9	FW	ITA	Mario Balotelli (from (England) Liverpool)
22	MF	GRE	Anastasios Donis (on loan from (Italy) Juventus)
23	FW	FRA	Alexy Bosetti (loan return from (Norway) Sarpsborg 08)
25	MF	FRA	Wylan Cyprien (from (France) Lens)
29	DF	BRA	Dalbert Henrique (from (Portugal) Vitória de Guimarães)
31	DF	BRA	Dante (from (Germany) VfL Wolfsburg)

Out:

No.	Pos.	Nation	Player
5	DF	FRA	Kévin Gomis (to (Scotland) Dundee)
9	MF	FRA	Hatem Ben Arfa (to (France) Paris Saint-Germain)
13	MF	SWE	Niklas Hult (to (Greece) Panathinaikos)
15	FW	FRA	Alexandre Mendy (to (France) Guingamp)
22	MF	FRA	Nampalys Mendy (to (England) Leicester City)

=== Paris Saint-Germain ===
In:

No.	Pos.	Nation	Player
12	DF	BEL	Thomas Meunier (from (Belgium) Club Brugge)
21	MF	FRA	Hatem Ben Arfa (from (France) Nice)
22	FW	ESP	Jesé (from (Spain) Real Madrid)
23	MF	POL	Grzegorz Krychowiak (from (Spain) Sevilla)
—	MF	ARG	Giovani Lo Celso (from (Argentina) Rosario Central)

Out:

No.	Pos.	Nation	Player
4	MF	FRA	Benjamin Stambouli (to (Germany) Schalke 04)
10	FW	SWE	Zlatan Ibrahimović (to (England) Manchester United)
23	DF	NED	Gregory van der Wiel (to (Turkey) Fenerbahçe S.K.)
30	GK	ITA	Salvatore Sirigu (on loan to (Spain) Sevilla)
32	DF	BRA	David Luiz (to (England) Chelsea)
—	DF	FRA	Lucas Digne (to (Spain) Barcelona, previously on loan at (Italy) Roma)
—	DF	COD	Jordan Ikoko (to (France) Guingamp, previously on loan at (France) Lens)
—	DF	FRA	Youssouf Sabaly (on loan to (France) Bordeaux, previously on loan at (France) Nantes)
—	MF	ARG	Giovani Lo Celso (on loan to (Argentina) Rosario Central)
—	MF	CIV	Yakou Méïte (to (England) Reading)

=== Stade Rennais F.C. ===
In:

No.	Pos.	Nation	Player
8	MF	FRA	Clément Chantôme (from (France) Bordeaux)
16	GK	FRA	Paul Nardi (on loan from Monaco)
25	DF	POR	Afonso Figueiredo (from (Portugal) Boavista)
27	MF	FRA	Anthony Ribelin (from (France) Montpeller)
—	FW	AUT	Philipp Hosiner (loan return from (Germany) 1. FC Köln)

Out:

No.	Pos.	Nation	Player
3	DF	SEN	Cheikh M'Bengue (to (France) Saint-Étienne)
14	DF	SEN	Fallou Diagne (to (Germany) Werder Bremen)
17	MF	FRA	Jérémie Boga (loan return to (England) Chelsea, later loaned to (Spain) Granada)
23	FW	FRA	Ousmane Dembélé (to (Germany) Borussia Dortmund)
—	DF	MKD	Gjoko Zajkov (to (Belgium) Charleroi, previously on loan)
—	FW	AUT	Philipp Hosiner (to (Germany) Union Berlin)

=== AS Saint-Étienne ===
In:

No.	Pos.	Nation	Player
7	MF	FRA	Bryan Dabo (from (France) Montpellier)
11	MF	SEN	Henri Saivet (on loan from (England) Newcastle United)
12	DF	SEN	Cheikh M'Bengue (from (France) Rennes)
14	MF	FRA	Jordan Veretout (on loan from (England) Aston Villa)
—	MF	FRA	Jonathan Bamba (loan return from (France) Paris)

Out:

No.	Pos.	Nation	Player
20	DF	FRA	Jonathan Brison (to (France) Chamois Niort)
26	DF	SEN	Moustapha Bayal Sall (to (Qatar) Al-Arabi)
29	DF	FRA	François Clerc (to (France) Gazélec Ajaccio)
32	DF	CMR	Benoît Assou-Ekotto (to (France) Metz)
—	MF	FRA	Jonathan Bamba (on loan to (Belgium) Sint-Truiden, previously on loan at (France) Paris)
—	MF	CIV	Ismaël Diomandé (to (France) SM Caen, previously on loan)

=== Toulouse FC ===
In:

No.	Pos.	Nation	Player
6	DF	FRA	Christopher Jullien (from (Germany) SC Freiburg)
21	MF	SWE	Jimmy Durmaz (from (Greece) Olympiacos)
25	MF	FRA	Jessy Pi (from Monaco, previously on loan at (France) Troyes)

Out:

No.	Pos.	Nation	Player
8	MF	FRA	Étienne Didot (to (France) Guingamp)
10	FW	FRA	Wissam Ben Yedder (to (Spain) Sevilla)
13	MF	FRA	Zinédine Machach (on loan to (France) Marseille)
26	DF	COD	Marcel Tisserand (loan return to Monaco, later sold to (Germany) FC Ingolstadt 04)
—	MF	POL	Dominik Furman (on loan to (Poland) Wisła Płock)

== Ligue 2 ==
=== AC Ajaccio ===
In:

No.	Pos.	Nation	Player
—	DF	COM	Kassim Abdallah (from (France) Évian TG)
—	FW	NIG	Moussa Maâzou (from (Denmark) Randers)
—	FW	FRA	Marvin Gakpa (on loan from (France) Lorient)
—	DF	FRA	Alioun Fall (from (France) Évian TG)
—	DF	FRA	Jordan Pierre-Charles (from (France) Colmar)
—	FW	FRA	Ilyes Chaïbi (on loan from Monaco)
—	GK	CMR	Jules Goda (from (France) Gazélec Ajaccio)
—	MF	FRA	Yann Boé-Kane (from (France) Red Star)

Out:

No.	Pos.	Nation	Player
—	DF	FRA	Vincent Marchetti (to (France) Nancy)
—	MF	POR	Claude Gonçalves (to (Portugal) Tondela)
—	FW	FRA	Julien Toudic (Free agent)
—	GK	FRA	Anthony Scribe (to (Georgia (country)) Dinamo Tbilisi)
—	DF	SEN	Zakaria Diallo (to (France) Brest)
—	DF	CIV	Zié Diabaté (to (France) Nîmes)
—	MF	FRA	Hugo Aine (to (France) Chambly)
—	FW	RUS	Andrei Panyukov (loan return to (Lithuania) Atlantas, later sold to (Portugal) Braga)

=== Amiens SC ===
In:

No.	Pos.	Nation	Player
—	MF	CMR	Guy Ngosso (from (France) Angers)

Out:

No.	Pos.	Nation	Player

=== AJ Auxerre ===
In:

No.	Pos.	Nation	Player
4	DF	FRA	Stéphane Sparagna (on loan from (France) Marseille)

Out:

No.	Pos.	Nation	Player
21	MF	SEN	Ibrahima Seck (to (Belgium) Waasland-Beveren)
25	DF	FRA	Sonhy Sefil (to (Greece) Asteras Tripolis)
27	DF	FRA	Salimo Sylla (to (Belgium) Sint-Truiden)

=== Football Bourg-en-Bresse Péronnas 01 ===
In:

No.	Pos.	Nation	Player

Out:

No.	Pos.	Nation	Player

=== Stade Brestois 29 ===
In:

No.	Pos.	Nation	Player

Out:

No.	Pos.	Nation	Player
3	DF	FRA	Simon Falette (to (France) Metz)
—	FW	CGO	Kévin Koubemba (loan return to (France) Lille, later sold to (Belgium) Sint-Truiden)

=== Clermont Foot ===
In:

No.	Pos.	Nation	Player
—	FW	SEN	Mamadou Thiam (on loan from (France) Dijon)

Out:

No.	Pos.	Nation	Player
18	FW	SEN	Famara Diedhiou (loan return to (France) Sochaux, later sold to (France) Angers)

=== Gazélec Ajaccio ===
In:

No.	Pos.	Nation	Player
29	DF	FRA	François Clerc (from (France) Saint-Étienne)
30	GK	MTQ	Steeve Elana (from (France) Lille)

Out:

No.	Pos.	Nation	Player
7	FW	FRA	Kévin Mayi (to (Netherlands) NEC)
13	DF	FRA	Alassane Touré (to (Belgium) Tubize)
21	DF	FRA	Pablo Martinez (to (France) Angers)

=== Stade Lavallois ===
In:

No.	Pos.	Nation	Player

Out:

No.	Pos.	Nation	Player
26	DF	MAR	Fouad Chafik (to (France) Dijon)
—	FW	HAI	Duckens Nazon (to (Portugal) Tondela)

=== Le Havre AC ===
In:

No.	Pos.	Nation	Player
16	GK	GLP	Yohann Thuram-Ulien (from (Belgium) Standard Liège)

Out:

No.	Pos.	Nation	Player
9	FW	FRA	Lys Mousset (to (England) Bournemouth)
12	FW	FRA	Joseph Mendes (to (England) Reading)

=== RC Lens ===
In:

No.	Pos.	Nation	Player
—	MF	TRI	John Bostock (from (Belgium) OH Leuven)

Out:

No.	Pos.	Nation	Player
18	MF	FRA	Pierrick Valdivia (to (Belgium) Sint-Truiden)
23	MF	FRA	Wylan Cyprien (to (France) Nice)
25	DF	FRA	Jean-Philippe Gbamin (to (Germany) Mainz 05)
—	GK	FRA	Joris Delle (to (Netherlands) NEC)
—	DF	COD	Jordan Ikoko (loan return to (France) Paris Saint-Germain, later sold to (France) Guingamp)

=== Nîmes Olympique ===
In:

No.	Pos.	Nation	Player
—	DF	FRA	Gaël Angoula (from (France) Angers)

Out:

No.	Pos.	Nation	Player
1	GK	FRA	Mathieu Michel (to (France) Angers)

=== Chamois Niortais F.C. ===
In:

No.	Pos.	Nation	Player
—	DF	FRA	Jonathan Brison (from (France) Saint-Étienne)
—	MF	FRA	Romain Grange (from (France) Paris)
—	FW	CMR	Didier Lamkel Ze (from (France) Lille)

Out:

No.	Pos.	Nation	Player

=== US Orléans ===
In:

No.	Pos.	Nation	Player
—	DF	COD	Joël Sami (from (Belgium) Zulte Waregem)
—	FW	GLP	Livio Nabab (from (Belgium) Waasland-Beveren)

Out:

No.	Pos.	Nation	Player

=== Red Star F.C. ===
In:

No.	Pos.	Nation	Player
17	MF	FRA	Jonathan Mexique (on loan from Monaco)
29	DF	FRA	Jean-Charles Castelletto (on loan from (Belgium) Club Brugge)

Out:

No.	Pos.	Nation	Player
—	DF	FRA	Julian Jeanvier (loan return to (France) Lille, later sold to (France) Stade Reims)

=== Stade de Reims ===
In:

No.	Pos.	Nation	Player
23	DF	FRA	Julian Jeanvier (from (France) Lille, previously on loan at (France) Red Star)

Out:

No.	Pos.	Nation	Player
3	DF	FRA	Franck Signorino (to (France) Metz)
5	DF	MAR	Abdelhamid El Kaoutari (loan return to (Italy) Palermo, later loaned to (France) Bastia)
8	MF	CGO	Prince Oniangué (to (England) Wolverhampton Wanderers)
9	FW	CGO	Thievy Bifouma (loan return to (Spain) Espanyol, later sold to (France) Bastia)
12	FW	FRA	Nicolas de Préville (to (France) Lille)
23	DF	ALG	Aïssa Mandi (to (Spain) Real Betis)

=== FC Sochaux-Montbéliard ===
In:

No.	Pos.	Nation	Player
—	FW	MAD	Faneva Imà Andriatsima (from (France) Créteil)

Out:

No.	Pos.	Nation	Player
19	FW	CMR	Karl Toko Ekambi (to (France) Angers)
—	FW	SEN	Famara Diedhiou (to (France) Angers, previously on loan at (France) Clermont Foot)

=== RC Strasbourg Alsace ===
In:

No.	Pos.	Nation	Player
—	FW	BEL	Baptiste Guillaume (on loan from (France) Lille)

Out:

No.	Pos.	Nation	Player

=== Tours FC ===
In:

No.	Pos.	Nation	Player
6	MF	MLI	Ousseynou Cissé (from (Spain) Rayo Vallecano)
21	FW	MLI	Cheick Fantamady Diarra (from (France) Paris)
26	DF	CIV	Daouda Konaté (from (France) Paris)
27	FW	BEL	Mayron De Almeida (from (Belgium) Virton)

Out:

No.	Pos.	Nation	Player
8	FW	TUN	Saîf-Eddine Khaoui (to (France) Marseille)
31	MF	FRA	Baptiste Santamaria (to (France) Angers)

=== Troyes AC ===
In:

No.	Pos.	Nation	Player

Out:

No.	Pos.	Nation	Player
5	DF	FRA	Matthieu Saunier (to (Spain) Granada)
9	FW	SEN	Babacar Guèye (to (Germany) Hannover 96)
23	MF	TUN	Fabien Camus (to (Belgium) Royal Antwerp)
25	MF	FRA	Jessy Pi (loan return to Monaco, later sold to (France) Toulouse)
33	DF	HAI	Carlens Arcus (to (France) Lille)
35	DF	FRA	Mouhamadou Dabo (to (France) SM Caen)

=== Valenciennes FC ===
In:

No.	Pos.	Nation	Player

Out:

No.	Pos.	Nation	Player
14	FW	FRA	Opa Nguette (to (France) Metz)
18	FW	BEL	Isaac Mbenza (to (Belgium) Standard Liège)
30	GK	FRA	Paul Charruau (to (France) Bastia)
—	DF	FRA	Yunis Abdelhamid (to (France) Dijon)

== See also ==
- 2016–17 Ligue 1
- 2016–17 Ligue 2
