= 2016–17 SC Bastia season =

Sporting Club de Bastia
2016–17 season
- Chairman: Pierre-Marie Geronimi
- Manager: Rui Almeida
- Stadium: Stade Armand Cesari
- Ligue 1: 20th (relegated)
- Coupe de France: Round of 64
- Coupe de la Ligue: Third round
- Top goalscorer: League: Enzo Crivelli (10); All: Enzo Crivelli (10)
| Home colours | Away colours | Third colours |

The 2016–17 SC Bastia season was the 51st consecutive season of the club in the French professional leagues. The club competed in Ligue 1, the Coupe de la Ligue and the Coupe de France.

== Players ==
French teams are limited to four players without EU citizenship. Hence, the squad list includes only the principal nationality of each player; several non-European players on the squad have dual citizenship with an EU country. Also, players from the ACP countries—countries in Africa, the Caribbean, and the Pacific that are signatories to the Cotonou Agreement—are not counted against non-EU quotas due to the Kolpak ruling.

=== Squad information ===
As of 31 January 2017.

Note: Flags indicate national team as defined under FIFA eligibility rules; some limited exceptions apply. Players may hold more than one non-FIFA nationality.

| No. | Pos. | Nation | Player |
|---|---|---|---|
| 1 | GK | FRA | Thomas Vincensini |
| 2 | MF | GUI | Sadio Diallo |
| 3 | DF | FRA | Nicolas Saint-Ruf |
| 4 | DF | MAR | Abdelhamid El Kaoutari (on loan from Palermo) |
| 5 | DF | FRA | Sébastien Squillaci |
| 8 | MF | FRA | Gaël Danic |
| 9 | FW | FRA | Florian Raspentino |
| 10 | FW | FRA | Allan Saint-Maximin (on loan from Monaco) |
| 11 | MF | FRA | Lenny Nangis (on loan from Lille) |
| 12 | MF | MLI | Abdoulaye Keita |
| 14 | MF | ALG | Mehdi Mostefa |
| 15 | MF | CGO | Prince Oniangué (on loan from Wolverhampton Wanderers) |
| 16 | GK | FRA | Jean-Louis Leca |

| No. | Pos. | Nation | Player |
|---|---|---|---|
| 17 | DF | FRA | Lindsay Rose (on loan from Lorient) |
| 18 | MF | FRA | Yannick Cahuzac (captain) |
| 19 | MF | FRA | Axel Ngando |
| 20 | DF | SWE | Pierre Bengtsson (on loan from Mainz 05) |
| 21 | MF | GHA | Geoffrey Acheampong |
| 22 | MF | FRA | Farid Boulaya |
| 23 | DF | FRA | Alexander Djiku |
| 25 | MF | MLI | Lassana Coulibaly |
| 27 | FW | FRA | Enzo Crivelli (on loan from Bordeaux) |
| 28 | DF | FRA | Florian Marange |
| 29 | DF | FRA | Gilles Cioni |
| 30 | GK | FRA | Alexis Thébaux |

==== Out on loan ====
Note: Flags indicate national team as defined under FIFA eligibility rules; some limited exceptions apply. Players may hold more than one non-FIFA nationality.

| No. | Pos. | Nation | Player |
|---|---|---|---|
| — | GK | FRA | Paul Charruau (on loan to Paris FC) |
| — | DF | FRA | Adrien Pianelli (on loan to Tarbes) |
| — | MF | FRA | Julien Benhaïm (on loan to Engordany) |
| — | MF | CPV | Jerson Cabral (on loan to Sparta Rotterdam) |

| No. | Pos. | Nation | Player |
|---|---|---|---|
| — | MF | FRA | Lyes Houri (on loan to Roda JC Kerkrade) |
| — | MF | FRA | Pierre-Antoine Seghi (on loan to Croix) |
| — | FW | FRA | Julien Romain (on loan to Pau) |

== Transfers ==
=== Summer ===
In:

| No. | Pos. | Nation | Player |
|---|---|---|---|
| 4 | DF | MAR | Abdelhamid El Kaoutari (on loan from (Italy) Palermo, previously on loan at (France) Reims) |
| 6 | MF | FRA | Allan Saint-Maximin (on loan from (France) Monaco, previously on loan at (Germany) Hannover 96) |
| 7 | MF | CPV | Jerson Cabral (from (Netherlands) Twente) |
| 11 | FW | FRA | Lenny Nangis (on loan from (France) Lille) |
| 13 | FW | CGO | Thievy Bifouma (from (Spain) Espanyol, previously on loan at (France) Reims) |
| 20 | DF | SWE | Pierre Bengtsson (on loan from (Germany) Mainz 05) |
| 22 | MF | FRA | Farid Boulaya (from (France) Clermont) |
| 30 | GK | FRA | Paul Charruau (from (France) Valenciennes) |

Out:

| No. | Pos. | Nation | Player |
|---|---|---|---|
| 1 | GK | DEN | Jesper Hansen (to (Denmark) Lyngby) |
| 6 | MF | FRA | Seko Fofana (loan return to (England) Manchester City, later sold to (Italy) Udinese) |
| 7 | MF | TOG | Floyd Ayité (to (England) Fulham) |
| 15 | MF | FRA | Julian Palmieri (to (France) Lille) |
| 25 | FW | GUI | François Kamano (to (France) Bordeaux) |

=== Winter ===
In:

| No. | Pos. | Nation | Player |
|---|---|---|---|
| 3 | DF | FRA | Nicolas Saint-Ruf (from (France) Montpellier) |
| 15 | MF | CGO | Prince Oniangué (on loan from (England) Wolverhampton Wanderers) |
| 17 | DF | FRA | Lindsay Rose (on loan from (France) Lorient) |
| — | GK | FRA | Alexis Thébaux (from (France) Paris FC) |

Out:

| No. | Pos. | Nation | Player |
|---|---|---|---|
| 7 | MF | CPV | Jerson Cabral (on loan to (Netherlands) Sparta Rotterdam) |
| 13 | FW | CGO | Thievy Bifouma (to (Turkey) Osmanlıspor) |
| 17 | DF | FRA | Mathieu Peybernes (to (France) Lorient) |
| 24 | MF | FRA | Lyes Houri (on loan to (Netherlands) Roda JC) |
| 30 | GK | FRA | Paul Charruau (on loan to (France) Paris FC) |

== Competitions ==
=== Ligue 1 ===
==== League table ====
| Pos | Team | Pld | W | D | L | GF | GA | GD | Pts | Qualification or relegation |
|---|---|---|---|---|---|---|---|---|---|---|
| 16 | Dijon | 38 | 8 | 13 | 17 | 46 | 58 | −12 | 37 | |
| 17 | Caen | 38 | 10 | 7 | 21 | 36 | 65 | −29 | 37 | |
| 18 | Lorient (R) | 38 | 10 | 6 | 22 | 44 | 70 | −26 | 36 | Qualification for the relegation play-offs |
| 19 | Nancy (R) | 38 | 9 | 8 | 21 | 29 | 52 | −23 | 35 | Relegation to Ligue 2 |
| 20 | Bastia (D, R) | 38 | 8 | 10 | 20 | 29 | 54 | −25 | 34 | Relegation to National 3 (Note: After being relegated to Ligue 2, Bastia was initially further relegated to National due to financial difficulties. On 10 August 2017, the FFF announced that Bastia was denied entry to National. The club therefore took the place of its reserve team in Championnat National 3.) |

Source: Ligue 1, Soccerway
Rules for classification: 1) Points; 2) Goal difference; 3) Goals scored; 4) Head-to-head goal difference; 5) Fairplay ranking.
(D) Disqualified; (R) Relegated

==== Results summary ====
| Overall | | | | | | | | Home | | | | | | Away | | | | | |
| Pld | W | D | L | GF | GA | GD | Pts | W | D | L | GF | GA | GD | W | D | L | GF | GA | GD |
|---|---|---|---|---|---|---|---|---|---|---|---|---|---|---|---|---|---|---|---|
| 38 | 8 | 10 | 20 | 29 | 54 | −25 | 34 | 5 | 9 | 5 | 17 | 14 | +3 | 3 | 1 | 15 | 12 | 40 | −28 |

Last updated: 20 May 2017.

==== Results by round ====
| Round | 1 | 2 | 3 | 4 | 5 | 6 | 7 | 8 | 9 | 10 | 11 | 12 | 13 | 14 | 15 | 16 | 17 | 18 | 19 | 20 | 21 | 22 | 23 | 24 | 25 | 26 | 27 | 28 | 29 | 30 | 31 | 32 | 33 | 34 | 35 | 36 | 37 | 38 |
|---|---|---|---|---|---|---|---|---|---|---|---|---|---|---|---|---|---|---|---|---|---|---|---|---|---|---|---|---|---|---|---|---|---|---|---|---|---|---|
| Ground | H | A | A | H | A | H | H | A | H | A | H | A | H | A | H | A | H | A | H | A | H | H | A | A | H | A | H | H | A | A | H | A | H | A | H | A | H | A |
| Result | L | W | L | W | L | D | W | L | L | L | D | L | D | D | D | L | W | W | L | L | D | D | L | L | D | L | D | D | L | L | L | W | L | L | W | L | W | L |
| Position | 19 | 7 | 16 | 9 | 11 | 12 | 10 | 11 | 14 | 15 | 14 | 17 | 16 | 16 | 16 | 18 | 16 | 12 | 15 | 17 | 18 | 19 | 19 | 19 | 19 | 19 | 19 | 19 | 19 | 19 | 19 | 20 | 20 | 20 | 20 | 20 | 20 | 20 |

A = Away; H = Home; W = Win; D = Draw; L = Loss

==== Matches ====
Win Draw Loss

| 12 August 2016 1 | Bastia | 0–1 | Paris Saint-Germain | Furiani |
| 20:00 | Cahuzac (yellow card) 22'; Squillaci (yellow card) 70'; Leca (yellow card) 90+3' | Report | Motta (yellow card) 35'; Kurzawa 73', (yellow card) 90+3'; Matuidi (yellow card) 90+2' | Stadium: Stade Armand Cesari; Attendance: 13,122; Referee: Frank Schneider |

| 20 August 2016 2 | Lorient | 0–3 | Bastia | Lorient |
| 20:00 | N'Dong (red card) 30'; Philippoteaux (yellow card) 64'; Mesloub (yellow card) 66'; Jeannot (red card) 77' | Report | Mostefa (yellow card) 6'; Saint-Maximin 25'; Diallo (yellow card) 35'; Crivelli 38', 81'; Marange (yellow card) 44'; Djiku (yellow card) 67' | Stadium: Stade du Moustoir - Yves Allainmat; Attendance: 10,248; Referee: Amaury Delerue |

| 27 August 2016 3 | Caen | 2–0 | Bastia | Caen |
| 20:00 | Ben Youssef (yellow card) 58'; Féret 64'; Bazile 64' | Report | Mostefa (yellow card) 60'; Crivelli (yellow card) 65'; Bifouma (yellow card) 68'; Marange (yellow card) 85'; Squillaci (yellow card) 88' | Stadium: Stade Michel d'Ornano; Attendance: 15,695; Referee: Lionel Jaffredo |

| 10 September 2016 4 | Bastia | 2–1 | Toulouse | Furiani |
| 20:00 | Cioni (yellow card) 17'; Diallo 20'; Nangis (yellow card) 59'; Bifouma (yellow card) 65'; Leca (yellow card) 68'; Bengtsson 82' | Report | Pi (yellow card) 35'; Yago (yellow card) 52'; Braithwaite 67', (yellow card) 68'; Cafaro (yellow card) 86' | Stadium: Stade Armand Cesari; Attendance: 9,966; Referee: Stéphane Lannoy |

| 10 September 2016 5 | Saint-Étienne | 1–0 | Bastia | Saint-Étienne |
| 20:00 | Tannane (yellow card) 65'; Selnæs (yellow card) 83'; Hamouma 90+3' (pen.) | Report | Leca (yellow card) 6'; Cioni (yellow card) 29'; Nangis (yellow card) 76'; Crivelli (yellow card) 89' | Stadium: Stade Geoffroy-Guichard; Attendance: 22,245; Referee: François Letexier |

| 21 September 2016 6 | Bastia | 0–0 | Nancy | Furiani |
| 19:00 | | Report | | Stadium: Stade Armand Cesari; Attendance: 9,139; Referee: Johan Hamel |

| 24 September 2016 7 | Bastia | 1–0 | Guingamp | Furiani |
| 20:00 | Danic (yellow card) 27'; Crivelli 76', (yellow card) 77' (yellow-red card) | Report | Marçal (yellow card) 29' (yellow-red card); Sorbon (yellow card) 78' | Stadium: Stade Armand Cesari; Attendance: 9,387; Referee: Amaury Delerue |

| 1 October 2016 8 | Nantes | 1–0 | Bastia | Nantes |
| 20:00 | Stępiński 18'; Sala (yellow card) 38'; Vizcarrondo (yellow card) 61'; Harit (yellow card) 65'; Bammou (yellow card) 90+2' | Report | Coulibaly (yellow card) 34'; Marange (yellow card) 55'; Mostefa (yellow card) 65' | Stadium: Stade de la Beaujoire - Louis Fonteneau; Attendance: 20,129; Referee: Bartolomeu Varela |

| 15 October 2016 9 | Bastia | 1–2 | Angers | Furiani |
| 20:00 | Bifouma 45'; Cioni (yellow card) 60'; Cahuzac (yellow card) 79' | Report | Diedhiou 26', 56' | Stadium: Stade Armand Cesari; Attendance: 9,303; Referee: Nicolas Rainville |

| 22 October 2016 10 | Lille | 2–1 | Bastia | Villeneuve-d'Ascq |
| 20:00 | Corchia 51'; Eder 57', (yellow card) 87'; Civelli (yellow card) 76'; Béria (yellow card) 90+3' | Report | Saint-Maximin (yellow card) 63'; Diallo 71' | Stadium: Stade Pierre-Mauroy; Attendance: 25,932; Referee: Ruddy Buquet |

| 29 October 2016 11 | Bastia | 0–0 | Dijon | Furiani |
| 20:00 | Cahuzac (yellow card) 65' | Report | Sammaritano (yellow card) 72' | Stadium: Stade Armand Cesari; Attendance: 10,048; Referee: Lionel Jaffredo |

| 5 November 2016 12 | Lyon | 2–1 | Bastia | Décines-Charpieu |
| 20:00 | Fekir (yellow card) 3'; Lacazette 37' (pen.); Bengtsson 86' (o.g.) | Report | Danic (yellow card) 1'; Diallo (yellow card) 41'; Leca (red card) 47'; Cahuzac (yellow card) 67' (yellow-red card); Crivelli 90+2' | Stadium: Parc Olympique Lyonnais; Attendance: 33,886; Referee: Frank Schneider |

| 19 November 2016 13 | Bastia | 1–1 | Montpellier | Furiani |
| 20:00 | Skhiri 6' (o.g.); Cioni (yellow card) 50'; Nangis (yellow card) 54' | Report | Mounié 55' | Stadium: Stade Armand Cesari; Attendance: 10,189; Referee: Sébastien Moreira |

| 27 November 2016 14 | Nice | 1–1 | Bastia | Nice |
| 17:00 | Pléa 11' | Report | Bifouma (yellow card) 28'; Cahuzac (yellow card) 45'; Crivelli 60'; Nangis (yellow card) 77' | Stadium: Allianz Riviera; Attendance: 20,856; Referee: Lionel Jaffredo |

| 30 November 2016 15 | Bastia | 1–1 | Bordeaux | Furiani |
| 19:00 | Danic (yellow card) 40'; Bifouma 49'; Leca (yellow card) 81'; Marange (red card) 82' | Report | Thelin (yellow card) 3'; Kamano (yellow card) 34'; Laborde 78'; Ménez (yellow card) 81'; Ounas (yellow card) 83' | Stadium: Stade Armand Cesari; Attendance: 11,421; Referee: Sébastien Desiage |

| 3 December 2016 16 | Monaco | 5–0 | Bastia | Monaco |
| 20:00 | Mbappé 10', (yellow card) 69'; Fabinho (yellow card) 17'; Jemerson (yellow card) 21'; Lemar 66'; Falcao 68', 73'; Carrillo 79' | Report | Cioni (yellow card) 23'; Danic (yellow card) 38'; Crivelli (yellow card) 80' | Stadium: Stade Louis II; Attendance: 7,019; Referee: Benoît Millot |

| 10 December 2016 17 | Bastia | 2–0 | Metz | Furiani |
| 20:00 | Coulibaly (yellow card) 22'; Danic 23', (yellow card) 83'; Saint-Maximin 75' | Report | Cohade (yellow card) 45'; Nguette (yellow card) 52' | Stadium: Stade Armand Cesari; Attendance: 9,882; Referee: Olivier Thual |

| 17 December 2016 18 | Rennes | 1–2 | Bastia | Rennes |
| 20:00 | Fernandes (yellow card) 45'; Sio 71' | Report | Crivelli 59'; Danic 63' | Stadium: Roazhon Park; Attendance: 22,637; Referee: Clément Turpin |

| 21 December 2016 19 | Bastia | 1–2 | Marseille | Furiani |
| 20:50 | Cioni (yellow card) 61'; Djiku 83' | Report | Gomis 8', (yellow card) 30'; Vainqueur (yellow card) 75'; Lopez (yellow card) 77'; N'Jie 90+1' | Stadium: Stade Armand Cesari; Attendance: 12,558; Referee: Benoît Millot |

| 14 January 2017 20 | Nancy | 1–0 | Bastia | Tomblaine |
| 20:00 | Guidileye (yellow card) 24'; Diarra (yellow card) 29'; Dia 59' | Report | Saint-Maximin (red card) 86' | Stadium: Stade Marcel Picot; Attendance: 15,423; Referee: Karim Abed |

| 20 January 2017 21 | Bastia | 1–1 | Nice | Furiani |
| 20:45 | Oniangué 17'; Cahuzac (yellow card) 56' (yellow-red card); Mostefa (yellow card) 90+1' | Report | Souquet 33' | Stadium: Stade Armand Cesari; Attendance: 9,757; Referee: Clément Turpin |

| 28 January 2017 22 | Bastia | 1–1 | Caen | Furiani |
| 20:00 | Saint-Maximin 26'; Mostefa (yellow card) 45+1'; Rose (yellow card) 90' | Report | Rodelin 45' (pen.); Da Silva (yellow card) 45+1'; Adéoti (yellow card) 90+3' | Stadium: Stade Armand Cesari; Attendance: 9,350; Referee: Amaury Delerue |

| 4 February 2017 23 | Montpellier | 2–1 | Bastia | Montpellier |
| 20:00 | Mounié 17', 64'; Skhiri (yellow card) 19'; Roussillon (yellow card) 37'; Deplagne (yellow card) 90' | Report | Oniangué (yellow card) 31'; Crivelli 34'; Djiku (red card) 90+3' | Stadium: Stade de la Mosson; Attendance: 8,960; Referee: Olivier Thual |

| 11 February 2017 24 | Toulouse | 4–1 | Bastia | Toulouse |
| 20:00 | Delort 38'; Braithwaite 43', 76' (pen.); Bodiger (yellow card) 57'; Blin (yellow card) 59'; Diop 86', (yellow card) 87' | Report | Saint-Ruf (yellow card) 36' (yellow-red card); Cahuzac (yellow card) 40' (yellow-red card); Oniangué 53'; Keita (yellow card) 60' | Stadium: Stadium Municipal; Attendance: 11,218; Referee: Jérôme Miguelgorry |

| 17 February 2017 25 | Bastia | 1–1 | Monaco | Furiani |
| 20:45 | Diallo 19'; Coulibaly (yellow card) 21'; Nangis (yellow card) 89' | Report | Silva 52' | Stadium: Stade Armand Cesari; Attendance: 10,059; Referee: Clément Turpin |

| 25 February 2017 26 | Angers | 3–0 | Bastia | Angers |
| 20:00 | Toko Ekambi 18', 57'; Cissokho (yellow card) 50'; Bourillon 78'; Bérigaud (yellow card) 80' | Report | Cahuzac (red card) 74' | Stadium: Stade Raymond Kopa; Attendance: 12,205; Referee: Karim Abed |

| 1 March 2017 27 | Bastia | 2–2 | Nantes | Furiani |
| 19:30 | Djiku (red card) 10'; Mostefa (yellow card) 14'; Danic 69'; Oniangué 75'; Keita (yellow card) 86'; Nangis (yellow card) 88' | Report | Sala 78'; Bammou (yellow card) 78'; Diego Carlos 90+2' | Stadium: Stade Armand Cesari; Attendance: 11,539; Referee: Ruddy Buquet |

| 4 March 2017 28 | Bastia | 0–0 | Saint-Étienne | Furiani |
| 20:00 | Saint-Ruf (red card) 44'; Danic (yellow card) 70' | Report | Lemoine (red card) 65'; Corgnet (yellow card) 77' | Stadium: Stade Armand Cesari; Attendance: 10,174; Referee: Nicolas Rainville |

| 11 March 2017 29 | Guingamp | 5–0 | Bastia | Guingamp |
| 20:00 | Salibur 47'; Deaux 56'; Briand 70'; Blas 78'; Mendy 86' | Report | Nangis (yellow card) 14'; Oniangué (yellow card) 35'; Danic (yellow card) 39' (yellow-red card) | Stadium: Stade de Roudourou; Attendance: 14,419; Referee: Antony Gautier |

| 17 March 2017 30 | Metz | 1–0 | Bastia | Metz |
| 19:00 | Cioni 46' (o.g.); Balliu (yellow card) 50'; Nguette (yellow card) 69' | Report | Cioni (yellow card) 38'; Ngando (yellow card) 78' | Stadium: Stade Saint-Symphorien; Attendance: 17,006; Referee: Johan Hamel |

| 1 April 2017 31 | Bastia | 0–1 | Lille | Furiani |
| 19:00 | Crivelli (yellow card) 74' | Report | Béria (yellow card) 25'; De Préville 48' | Stadium: Stade Armand Cesari; Attendance: 9,908; Referee: Benoît Millot |

| 8 April 2017 32 | Dijon | 1–2 | Bastia | Dijon |
| 20:00 | Lees-Melou 29'; Abeid (yellow card) 87'; Rivière (yellow card) 89' | Report | Crivelli 17'; Cahuzac 58' | Stadium: Stade Gaston Gérard; Attendance: 11,712; Referee: François Letexier |

| 16 April 2017 33 | Bastia | 0–3; Awarded | Lyon | Furiani |
| 17:00 | | | | Stadium: Stade Armand Cesari |

| 22 April 2017 34 | Bordeaux | 2–0 | Bastia | Bordeaux |
| 20:00 | Lewczuk (yellow card) 25'; Malcom 55'; Sankharé 69', (yellow card) 74' | Report | Mostefa (yellow card) 26'; El Kaoutari (yellow card) 68' (yellow-red card); Diallo (yellow card) 84' | Stadium: Matmut Atlantique; Attendance: 25,487; Referee: Tony Chapron |

| 29 April 2017 35 | Bastia | 1–0 | Rennes | Fos-sur-Mer |
| 20:00 | Cahuzac (yellow card) 64'; Crivelli 68' | Report | Bensebaini (yellow card) 71' | Stadium: Stade Parsemain; Referee: Jérôme Miguelgorry |

| 6 May 2017 36 | Paris Saint-Germain | 5–0 | Bastia | Paris |
| 17:00 | Lucas 32'; Verratti 35'; Meunier (yellow card) 74'; Cavani 76', 89'; Marquinhos 82' | Report | Leca (yellow card) 35'; Mostefa (yellow card) 59' | Stadium: Parc des Princes; Attendance: 45,826; Referee: François Letexier |

| 14 May 2017 37 | Bastia | 2–0 | Lorient | Fos-sur-Mer |
| 21:00 | Crivelli (yellow card) 3', (goal) 74'; Nangis (yellow card) 42'; Coulibaly (yellow card) 82'; Danic 86' | Report | Mvuemba (yellow card) 53'; Waris (yellow card) 79' | Stadium: Stade Parsemain; Referee: Ruddy Buquet |

| 20 May 2017 38 | Marseille | 1–0 | Bastia | Marseille |
| 21:00 | Fanni (yellow card) 56'; Gomis 74'; Vainqueur (yellow card) 77'; N'Jie (yellow card) 79' | Report | Djikuu (yellow card) 50'; Danic (yellow card) 77' | Stadium: Stade Vélodrome; Attendance: 55,178; Referee: Frank Schneider |

=== Coupe de France ===
| 7 January 2017 Round of 64 | Paris Saint-Germain | 7–0 | Bastia | Paris |
| 21:00 | Thiago Silva 31'; Rabiot 42'; Nkunku 48'; Motta 57'; Lucas 63' (pen.); Di María 77'; Matuidi (yellow card) 79'; Draxler 89' | Report | Marange (yellow card) 56' | Stadium: Parc des Princes; Attendance: 30,000; Referee: Jérôme Miguelgorry |

=== Coupe de la Ligue ===
| 26 October 2016 Third round | Bastia | 1–1 (3–4 p) | Guingamp | Furiani |
| 21:05 | Marange 45+2'; Danic (yellow card) 83' | Report | Privat 28'; Pereira (yellow card) 45+1' (yellow-red card) 64'; Mané (yellow card) 81'; Salin (yellow card) 90+2' | Stadium: Stade Armand Cesari; Attendance: 6,029; Referee: Mikael Lesage |
| | Penalties |
| | Diallo (penalty scored); Danic (penalty scored); Bifouma (penalty missed); Bengtsson (penalty missed); Saint-Maximin (penalty scored) | | (penalty scored) De Pauw; (penalty scored) Sankoh; (penalty missed) Livolant; (penalty scored) Mané; (penalty scored) Blas |
