= 2015–16 Paris FC season =

Paris FC
2015–16 season
- Chairman: Pierre Ferracci
- Manager: Jean-Luc Vasseur
- Stadium: Stade Sébastien Charléty
- Ligue 2: 20th (relegated)
- Coupe de France: Eighth round
- Coupe de la Ligue: First round
Home colours	Away colours

The 2015–16 season was the 47th season in the existence of Paris FC and the club's first season back in the second division of French football since 1982. In addition to the domestic league, Paris FC participated in this season's editions of the Coupe de France and the Coupe de la Ligue.

== Players ==
=== First-team squad ===
Note: Flags indicate national team as defined under FIFA eligibility rules; some limited exceptions apply. Players may hold more than one non-FIFA nationality.

No.	Pos.	Nation	Player
1	GK	FRA	Vincent Demarconnay
2	DF	FRA	Axel Disasi
3	DF	TUN	Bilel Mohsni
4	MF	MLI	Ismaël Keïta
5	DF	ALG	Mehdi Tahrat
6	MF	Guadeloupe	Thomas Gamiette
7	MF	MLI	Tiécoro Keita
8	MF	FRA	Loïc Poujol
9	FW	MLI	Cheick Fantamady Diarra
11	MF	FRA	Roli Pereira de Sa (on loan from Paris SG)
12	FW	FRA	Nicolas Fauvergue
13	DF	FRA	Sébastien Cantini
14	FW	CIV	Bakari Koné
15	FW	COM	Ahmed Mogni
16	GK	FRA	Alexandre Bouchard
17	MF	FRA	Vincent Pirès

No.	Pos.	Nation	Player
18	MF	FRA	Jonathan Bamba (on loan from Saint-Étienne)
19	DF	CIV	Hervé Lybohy
20	MF	FRA	Baboye Traoré
21	MF	GNB	Bocundji Ca
22	FW	TUN	Khaled Ayari
23	FW	GLP	Richard Socrier
24	MF	COD	Dylan Bahamboula (on loan from Monaco)
26	MF	CMR	Rodrigue Bongongui
27	DF	MTQ	Christopher Glombard (on loan from Reims)
28	MF	FRA	Idriss Ech-Chergui
29	MF	FRA	Romain Grange
30	GK	FRA	Alexis Thébaux
31	FW	GUI	Demba Camara
32	DF	HAI	Jean-Jacques Pierre
37	DF	FRA	Théo Pellenard (on loan from Bordeaux)

=== Out on loan ===
Note: Flags indicate national team as defined under FIFA eligibility rules; some limited exceptions apply. Players may hold more than one non-FIFA nationality.

No.	Pos.	Nation	Player
—	DF	CIV	Soualio Bakayoko (at Chambly)
—	DF	CIV	Daouda Konaté (at Dunkerque)

No.	Pos.	Nation	Player
—	DF	FRA	Samuel Yohou (at Épinal)
—	FW	FRA	Aboubakary Kanté (at CA Bastia)

== Competitions ==
=== Overall record ===
Competition	First match	Last match	Starting round	Final position	Record							
Competition	First match	Last match	Starting round	Final position	Pld	W	D	L	GF	GA	GD	Win %
Ligue 2	31 July 2015	13 May 2016	Matchday 1	20th	38	4	18	16	32	51	−19	10.53
Coupe de France	21 November 2015	5 December 2015	Seventh round	Eighth round	2	0	1	1	1	3	−2	0.00
Coupe de la Ligue	11 August 2015		First round	First round	1	0	0	1	1	2	−1	0.00
Total					41	4	19	18	34	56	−22	9.76

Source: Competitions

=== Ligue 2 ===
==== League table ====
Pos	Team	Pld	W	D	L	GF	GA	GD	Pts	Promotion or Relegation
16	Niort	38	8	18	12	38	45	−7	42	
17	Ajaccio	38	9	15	14	34	42	−8	42	
18	Evian (Note: Evian was demoted due to financial difficulties.) (R, D)	38	9	12	17	41	41	0	39	Demotion to Division d'Honneur Régionale
19	Créteil (R)	38	8	10	20	42	66	−24	34	Relegation to Championnat National
20	Paris FC (R)	38	4	18	16	32	51	−19	30	Relegation to Championnat National

Source: Ligue 2
Rules for classification: 1) points; 2) goal difference; 3) number of goals scored; 4) head-to-head goal difference; 5) fair play points
(D) Disqualified; (R) Relegated

==== Results summary ====
Overall								Home						Away					
Pld	W	D	L	GF	GA	GD	Pts	W	D	L	GF	GA	GD	W	D	L	GF	GA	GD
38	4	18	16	32	51	−19	30	2	11	6	16	22	−6	2	7	10	16	29	−13

Source: Ligue 2

==== Results by round ====
Round	1	2	3	4	5	6	7	8	9	10	11	12	13	14	15	16	17	18	19	20	21	22	23	24	25	26	27	28	29	30	31	32	33	34	35	36	37	38
Ground	H	A	H	A	H	A	H	A	H	A	H	H	A	H	A	H	A	H	A	H	A	H	A	H	A	H	A	H	A	A	H	A	H	A	H	A	H	A
Result	D	D	W	D	D	D	D	D	D	L	D	D	L	L	L	L	D	L	D	L	L	D	L	D	L	D	L	D	D	L	L	W	W	L	D	W	L	L
Position	5	10	5	8	10	11	10	11	11	14	14	15	16	18	18	18	18	19	19	19	20	20	20	20	20	20	20	20	20	20	20	20	20	20	20	20	20	20

Source: Ligue 2
A = Away; H = Home; W = Win; D = Draw; L = Loss

==== Matches ====
31 July 2015 1	Paris FC	1–1	Laval	Paris
CET (UTC+1)		Report		Stadium: Stade Sebastien Charléty

7 August 2015 2	Tours	0–0	Paris FC	Tours
CET (UTC+1)		Report

14 August 2015 3	Paris FC	3–0	Le Havre	Paris
CET (UTC+1)		Report		Stadium: Stade Sebastien Charléty

21 August 2015 4	Sochaux	1–1	Paris FC	Montbéliard
CET (UTC+1)		Report		Stadium: Stade Auguste Bonal

28 August 2015 5	Paris FC	1–1	Brest	Paris
CET (UTC+1)		Report		Stadium: Stade Sebastien Charléty

11 September 2015 6	Clermont	1–1	Paris FC	Clermont-Ferrand
CET (UTC+1)		Report

19 September 2015 7	Paris FC	0–0	Evian	Paris
CET (UTC+1)		Report		Stadium: Stade Sebastien Charléty

22 September 2015 8	Nîmes	1–1	Paris FC	Nîmes
CET (UTC+1)		Report

28 September 2015 9	Paris FC	1–1	Nancy	Paris
20:30 CET (UTC+1)		Report		Stadium: Stade Sebastien Charléty

2 October 2015 10	Auxerre	2–0	Paris FC	Auxerre
CET (UTC+1)		Report

19 February 2016 27	Nancy	3–2	Paris FC	Tomblaine
20:00 CET (UTC+1)		Report		Stadium: Stade Marcel Picot

=== Coupe de France ===
21 November 2015 Seventh round	CMS Oissel	0–0 (a.e.t.) (4–5 p)	Paris FC	Oissel
14:00				Stadium: Stade Marcel Billard; Attendance: 300; Referee: Pierre Gaillouste

5 December 2015 Eighth round	Paris FC	1–3	Boulogne	Paris
18:00	Lybohy (yellow card) 45'; Tahrat (yellow card) 80'; Bahamboula 86'		Thil 9', 11'; Pandor 19'	Stadium: Stade Charléty; Attendance: 882; Referee: Olivier Thual

=== Coupe de la Ligue ===
11 August 2015 First round	Paris FC	1–2 (a.e.t.)	Metz	Paris
20:00	Kinkela 70'		Ngbakoto 17'; Bussmann 92'	Stadium: Stade Charléty; Attendance: 2,466; Referee: Hamid Guenaoui
