= List of French football transfers winter 2016–17 =

This is a list of French football transfers for the 2016–17 winter transfer window. Only moves featuring Ligue 1 or Ligue 2 are listed.

== Ligue 1 ==
Note: Flags indicate national team as has been defined under FIFA eligibility rules. Players may hold more than one non-FIFA nationality.

=== Angers SCO ===
In:

No.	Pos.	Nation	Player
2	FW	FRA	Kévin Bérigaud (on loan from (France) Montpellier)
22	FW	FRA	Jonathan Bamba (on loan from (France) Saint-Étienne)
25	DF	CIV	Abdoulaye Bamba (free agent)
28	DF	FRA	Issa Cissokho (on loan from (Italy) Genoa)

Out:

No.	Pos.	Nation	Player
12	FW	FRA	Yoane Wissa (on loan to (France) Laval)

=== SC Bastia ===
In:

No.	Pos.	Nation	Player
3	DF	FRA	Nicolas Saint-Ruf (from (France) Montpellier)
15	MF	CGO	Prince Oniangué (on loan from (England) Wolverhampton)
17	DF	FRA	Lindsay Rose (on loan from (France) Lorient)
—	GK	FRA	Alexis Thébaux (from (France) Paris FC)

Out:

No.	Pos.	Nation	Player
7	MF	CPV	Jerson Cabral (on loan to (Netherlands) Sparta Rotterdam)
13	FW	CGO	Thievy Bifouma (to (Turkey) Osmanlıspor)
17	DF	FRA	Mathieu Peybernes (to (France) Lorient)
24	MF	FRA	Lyes Houri (on loan to (Netherlands) Roda JC)
30	GK	FRA	Paul Charruau (on loan to (France) Paris FC)

=== FC Girondins de Bordeaux ===
In:

No.	Pos.	Nation	Player
4	DF	SRB	Vukašin Jovanović (on loan from (Russia) Zenit)
13	MF	SEN	Younousse Sankharé (from (France) Lille)
28	MF	ARG	Daniel Mancini (from (Argentina) Newell's Old Boys)

Out:

No.	Pos.	Nation	Player
4	DF	BRA	Pablo (on loan to (Brazil) Corinthians)
12	FW	SWE	Isaac Kiese Thelin (on loan to (Belgium) Anderlecht)
21	DF	FRA	Cédric Yambéré (on loan to (Cyprus) APOEL, previously on loan at (Russia) Anzhi Makhachkala)
27	MF	FRA	Grégory Sertic (to (France) Marseille)

=== SM Caen ===
In:

No.	Pos.	Nation	Player

Out:

No.	Pos.	Nation	Player
8	MF	COD	Jordan Nkololo (on loan to (France) Laval)

=== Dijon FCO ===
In:

No.	Pos.	Nation	Player
5	DF	TUN	Oussama Haddadi (from (Tunisia) Club Africain)
22	MF	KOR	Kwon Chang-hoon (from (South Korea) Suwon)

Out:

No.	Pos.	Nation	Player
5	DF	FRA	Quentin Bernard (to (France) Brest)
22	MF	FRA	Johan Gastien (to (France) Brest)

=== En Avant de Guingamp ===
In:

No.	Pos.	Nation	Player
27	MF	FRA	Mathieu Bodmer (free agent)

Out:

No.	Pos.	Nation	Player
—	DF	CIV	Benjamin Angoua (on loan to (United States) New England)

=== Lille OSC ===
In:

No.	Pos.	Nation	Player
7	FW	NED	Anwar El Ghazi (from (Netherlands) Ajax)
8	MF	POR	Xeka (on loan from (Portugal) Braga)
10	FW	NED	Ricardo Kishna (on loan from (Italy) Lazio)
22	FW	PAR	Júnior Alonso (from (Paraguay) Cerro Porteño)
26	MF	FRA	Farès Bahlouli (from (France) Monaco)
—	DF	BRA	Gabriel (from (Brazil) Avaí)
—	MF	ALB	Agim Zeka (from (Albania) Skënderbeu Korçë)

Out:

No.	Pos.	Nation	Player
4	MF	SEN	Younousse Sankharé (to (France) Bordeaux)
5	DF	ARG	Renato Civelli (to (Argentina) Banfield)
8	MF	MAR	Mounir Obbadi (to (France) Nice)
10	MF	FRA	Morgan Amalfitano (to (France) Rennes)
13	DF	ZAM	Stoppila Sunzu (on loan to (Russia) Arsenal Tula)
20	FW	CPV	Ryan Mendes (to (Turkey) Kayserispor)
—	FW	CIV	Junior Tallo (on loan to (France) Amiens)
—	FW	RSA	Lebo Mothiba (on loan to (France) Valenciennes)

=== FC Lorient ===
In:

No.	Pos.	Nation	Player
17	DF	FRA	Mathieu Peybernes (from (France) Bastia)
23	MF	GHA	Alhassan Wakaso (from (Portugal) Rio Ave)

Out:

No.	Pos.	Nation	Player
11	DF	FRA	Faïz Selemani (on loan to (France) Tours)
23	FW	CIV	Moryké Fofana (to (Turkey) Konyaspor)
26	DF	FRA	Lindsay Rose (on loan to (France) Bastia)

=== Olympique Lyonnais ===
In:

No.	Pos.	Nation	Player
9	FW	NED	Memphis Depay (from (England) Manchester United)

Out:

No.	Pos.	Nation	Player
6	MF	FRA	Gueïda Fofana (retired)
7	MF	FRA	Clément Grenier (on loan to (Italy) Roma)
24	MF	FRA	Olivier Kemen (on loan to (France) GFC Ajaccio)
26	FW	FRA	Aldo Kalulu (on loan to (France) Rennes)

=== Olympique de Marseille ===
In:

No.	Pos.	Nation	Player
11	MF	FRA	Dimitri Payet (from (England) West Ham United)
13	MF	FRA	Grégory Sertic (from (France) Bordeaux)
21	DF	FRA	Patrice Evra (from (Italy) Juventus)

Out:

No.	Pos.	Nation	Player
—	FW	ARG	Lucas Ocampos (on loan to (Italy) Milan, previously on loan to (Italy) Genoa)

=== FC Metz ===
In:

No.	Pos.	Nation	Player
18	FW	MLI	Cheick Diabaté (on loan from (Turkey) Osmanlıspor)
—	DF	SEN	Fallou Diagne (on loan from (Germany) Werder Bremen)

Out:

No.	Pos.	Nation	Player
17	FW	SEN	Habib Diallo (on loan to (France) Brest)

=== AS Monaco ===
In:

No.	Pos.	Nation	Player
6	DF	BRA	Jorge (from (Brazil) Flamengo)

Out:

No.	Pos.	Nation	Player
12	MF	FRA	Farès Bahlouli (to (France) Lille)
16	GK	FRA	Paul Nardi (on loan to (Belgium) Cercle Brugge, previously on loan at (France) Stade Rennes)
20	MF	MLI	Adama Traoré (on loan to (Portugal) Rio Ave)
21	DF	NGR	Elderson Echiéjilé (on loan to (Spain) Sporting de Gijón, previously on loan to (Belgium) Standard Liège)
28	FW	FRA	Corentin Jean (on loan to (France) Toulouse)
—	DF	FRA	Mehdi Beneddine (on loan to (Belgium) Cercle Brugge)
—	FW	GUI	Tafsir Chérif (on loan to (Belgium) Cercle Brugge)
—	FW	FRA	Quentin Ngakoutou (on loan to (Belgium) Union SG)
—	FW	CIV	Lacina Traoré (on loan to (Spain) Sporting de Gijón, previously on loan to (Russia) CSKA Moscow)

=== Montpellier HSC ===
In:

No.	Pos.	Nation	Player
11	MF	FRA	Jonathan Ikoné (on loan from (France) Paris Saint-Germain)
12	DF	CZE	Lukáš Pokorný (from (Czech Republic) Slovan Liberec)
18	FW	BEL	Isaac Mbenza (from (Belgium) Standard Liège)
20	MF	RSA	Keagan Dolly (from (South Africa) Mamelodi Sundows)
23	DF	FRA	Nordi Mukiele (from (France) Laval)

Out:

No.	Pos.	Nation	Player
—	FW	FRA	Kévin Bérigaud (on loan to (France) Angers)

=== AS Nancy ===
In:

No.	Pos.	Nation	Player

Out:

No.	Pos.	Nation	Player
2	DF	FRA	Clément Lenglet (to (Spain) Sevilla)

=== FC Nantes ===
In:

No.	Pos.	Nation	Player
20	FW	COL	Felipe Pardo (on loan from (Greece) Olympiacos)
22	FW	BFA	Préjuce Nakoulma (free agent)
23	MF	POR	Sérgio Oliveira (on loan from (Portugal) Porto)
—	FW	ISL	Kolbeinn Sigþórsson (loan return from (Turkey) Galatasaray)

Out:

No.	Pos.	Nation	Player
2	FW	VEN	Fernando Aristeguieta (to (Portugal) Nacional)
23	MF	DEN	Nicolaj Thomsen (to (Denmark) Copenhagen)

=== OGC Nice ===
In:

No.	Pos.	Nation	Player
11	MF	TUN	Bassem Srarfi (from (Tunisia) Club Africain)
24	MF	MAR	Mounir Obbadi (from (France) Lille)

Out:

No.	Pos.	Nation	Player
1	GK	FRA	Mouez Hassen (on loan to (England) Southampton)

=== Paris Saint-Germain ===
In:

No.	Pos.	Nation	Player
15	FW	POR	Gonçalo Guedes (from (Portugal) Benfica)
23	MF	GER	Julian Draxler (from (Germany) VfL Wolfsburg)

Out:

No.	Pos.	Nation	Player
22	FW	ESP	Jesé (on loan to (Spain) Las Palmas)
30	GK	ITA	Salvatore Sirigu (on loan to (Spain) Osasuna, previously on loan to (Spain) Sevilla)
—	MF	FRA	Jonathan Ikoné (on loan to (France) Montpellier)

=== Stade Rennais F.C. ===
In:

No.	Pos.	Nation	Player
14	FW	FRA	Aldo Kalulu (on loan from (France) Lyon)
16	GK	ALG	Raïs M'Bolhi (from (Turkey) Antalyaspor)
18	MF	FRA	Morgan Amalfitano (from (France) Lille)

Out:

No.	Pos.	Nation	Player
7	MF	FRA	Paul-Georges Ntep (to (Germany) VfL Wolfsburg)
—	GK	FRA	Paul Nardi (loan return to (France) Monaco, later loaned to (Belgium) Cercle Brugge)
—	FW	POL	Kamil Grosicki (to (England) Hull City)

=== AS Saint-Étienne ===
In:

No.	Pos.	Nation	Player
26	MF	POR	Jorginho (on loan from (Portugal) Arouca)

Out:

No.	Pos.	Nation	Player
—	FW	FRA	Jonathan Bamba (on loan to (France) Angers)

=== Toulouse FC ===
In:

No.	Pos.	Nation	Player
15	FW	FRA	Corentin Jean (on loan from (France) Monaco)
39	FW	FRA	Andy Delort (from (Mexico) Tigres)

Out:

No.	Pos.	Nation	Player

== Ligue 2 ==
=== AC Ajaccio ===
In:

No.	Pos.	Nation	Player

Out:

No.	Pos.	Nation	Player

=== Amiens SC ===
In:

No.	Pos.	Nation	Player
11	FW	CIV	Junior Tallo (on loan from (France) Lille)

Out:

No.	Pos.	Nation	Player

=== AJ Auxerre ===
In:

No.	Pos.	Nation	Player
9	FW	GUI	Mohamed Yattara (on loan from (Belgium) Standard Liège)
28	MF	MLI	Birama Touré (on loan from (Belgium) Standard Liège)
35	DF	SEN	Vieux Sané (on loan from (Turkey) Bursaspor)

Out:

No.	Pos.	Nation	Player

=== Bourg-Péronnas ===
In:

No.	Pos.	Nation	Player

Out:

No.	Pos.	Nation	Player

=== Stade Brestois 29 ===
In:

No.	Pos.	Nation	Player
2	DF	FRA	Quentin Bernard (from (France) Dijon)
8	MF	FRA	Johan Gastien (from (France) Dijon)
26	FW	SEN	Habib Diallo (on loan from (France) Metz)

Out:

No.	Pos.	Nation	Player

=== Clermont Foot ===
In:

No.	Pos.	Nation	Player

Out:

No.	Pos.	Nation	Player

=== Gazélec Ajaccio ===
In:

No.	Pos.	Nation	Player
7	MF	FRA	Olivier Kemen (on loan to (France) Lyon)

Out:

No.	Pos.	Nation	Player

=== Stade Lavallois ===
In:

No.	Pos.	Nation	Player
29	FW	FRA	Yoane Wissa (on loan from (France) Angers)
—	MF	COD	Jordan Nkololo (on loan from (France) SM Caen)

Out:

No.	Pos.	Nation	Player
—	DF	FRA	Nordi Mukiele (to (France) Montpellier)

=== Le Havre AC ===
In:

No.	Pos.	Nation	Player

Out:

No.	Pos.	Nation	Player

=== RC Lens ===
In:

No.	Pos.	Nation	Player

Out:

No.	Pos.	Nation	Player
—	FW	FRA	Teddy Chevalier (to (Belgium) Kortrijk)

=== Nîmes Olympique ===
In:

No.	Pos.	Nation	Player

Out:

No.	Pos.	Nation	Player

=== Chamois Niortais F.C. ===
In:

No.	Pos.	Nation	Player

Out:

No.	Pos.	Nation	Player

=== US Orléans ===
In:

No.	Pos.	Nation	Player

Out:

No.	Pos.	Nation	Player

=== Red Star FC ===
In:

No.	Pos.	Nation	Player

Out:

No.	Pos.	Nation	Player

=== Stade de Reims ===
In:

No.	Pos.	Nation	Player

Out:

No.	Pos.	Nation	Player

=== FC Sochaux-Montbéliard ===
In:

No.	Pos.	Nation	Player

Out:

No.	Pos.	Nation	Player

=== RC Strasbourg ===
In:

No.	Pos.	Nation	Player

Out:

No.	Pos.	Nation	Player

=== Tours FC ===
In:

No.	Pos.	Nation	Player
4	MF	ALG	Ismaël Bennacer (on loan from (England) Arsenal)
28	DF	FRA	Faïz Selemani (on loan from (France) Lorient)

Out:

No.	Pos.	Nation	Player

=== Troyes AC ===
In:

No.	Pos.	Nation	Player

Out:

No.	Pos.	Nation	Player

=== Valenciennes FC ===
In:

No.	Pos.	Nation	Player
14	FW	RSA	Lebo Mothiba (on loan from (France) Lille)

Out:

No.	Pos.	Nation	Player

== See also ==
- 2016–17 Ligue 1
- 2016–17 Ligue 2
