= Axel Ngando =

French footballer (born 1993)

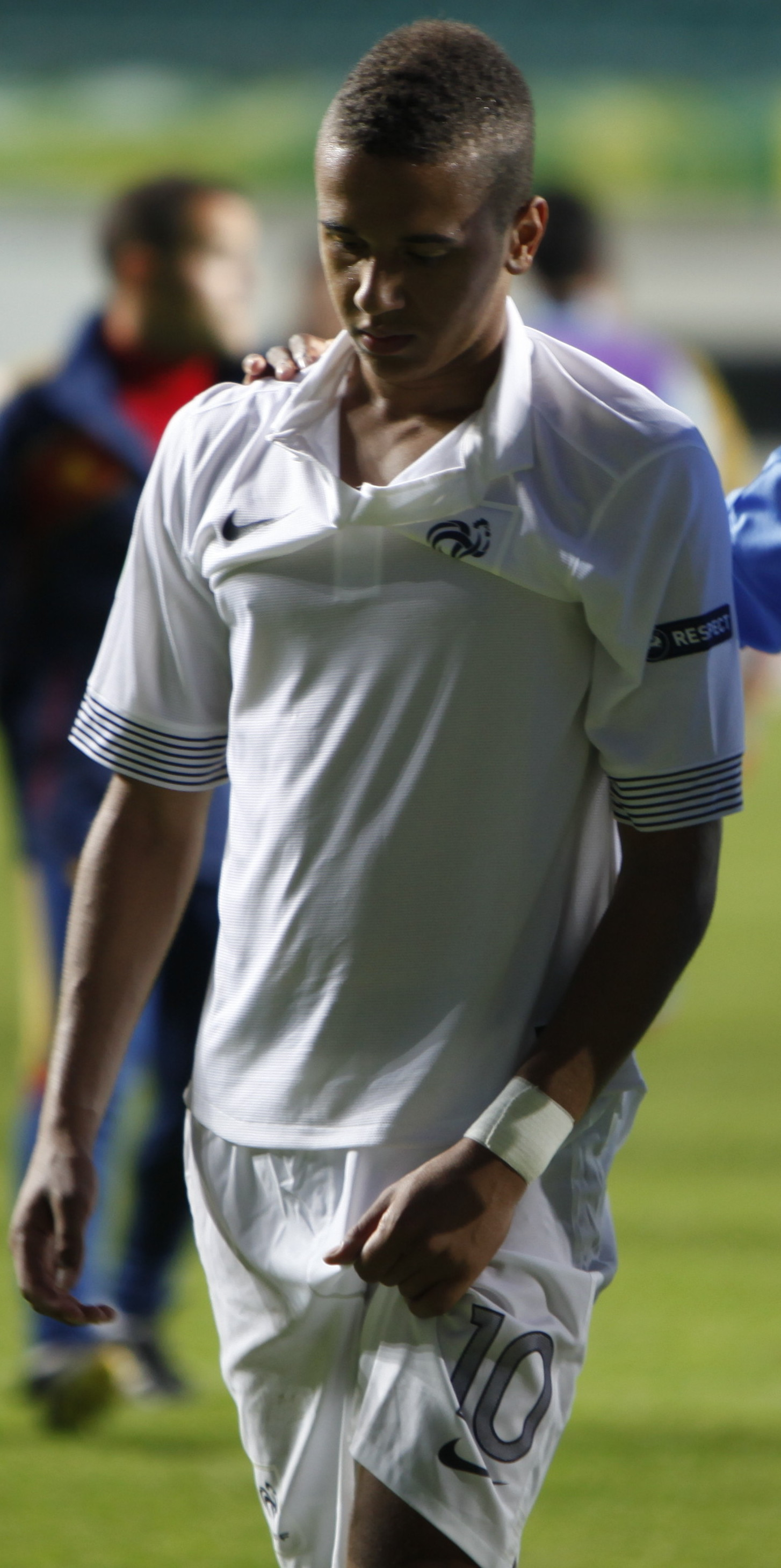
- Ngando with France U19 in July 2012

Personal information
- Full name: Axel Thomas Ngando Elessa
- Date of birth: 13 July 1993 (age 33)
- Place of birth: Asnières-sur-Seine, France
- Height: 1.77 m (5 ft 10 in)
- Position: Midfielder

Youth career
- 2000–2002: A.S. Courdimanche
- 2002–2004: U.S. Méry-sur-Oise
- 2004–2005: A.S. Saint-Ouen l' Aumone
- 2005–2007: Paris Saint-Germain
- 2007–2012: Rennes

Senior career*
Years	Team	Apps	(Gls)
2011–2013	Rennes B	23	(3)
2012–2015	Rennes	4	(1)
2013	→ Auxerre B (loan)	1	(1)
2013–2014	→ Auxerre (loan)	25	(3)
2015	→ Angers (loan)	19	(1)
2015–2016	Bastia B	3	(1)
2015–2017	Bastia	42	(2)
2017–2019	Göztepe	30	(3)
2019–2021	Auxerre	45	(7)
2021–2023	Grenoble	23	(0)
2023–2024	Araz-Naxçıvan	18	(0)

International career
2011	France U18	4	(0)
2011–2012	France U19	15	(1)
2012–2013	France U20	13	(2)
2013–2014	France U21	4	(0)
Medal record
Representing France
Men's football
FIFA U-20 World Cup
Winner	2013 Turkey
- * Club domestic league appearances and goals as of 28 November 2025

Axel Thomas Ngando Elessa (born 13 July 1993) is a former French professional footballer who played as a midfielder.

== Club career ==
=== Early career and loans ===
Ngando started his career playing for the "B" team of Rennes, who played in the Championnat de France Amateur. He scored his first goal for the "B" team on 21 May 2011 against Poiré-sur-Vie, in which he scored in the 47th minute to help his team to a 3–2 victory. His second goal for Rennes's reserves came on 4 November 2012 against La Chapelle-des-Marais, in which he scored in the 82nd minute to provide his team a 2–0 victory.

After several impressive matches for the Rennes "B" team, Ngando made his debut for the first-team in a Ligue 1 game on 2 February 2013 against Lorient, in which he came on as a 90th-minute substitute for Romain Alessandrini and scored a goal, just one minute into his debut in the 91st minute to equalize for Rennes and finish the match at a score of 2–2.

Rennes loaned Ngando to Auxerre on 4 September 2013, to continue his progress. Three days later, he made his first start with Auxerre B against Feurs.

On 12 January 2015, Ngando was loaned to Angers for the remainder of the 2014–15 season.

=== Later career ===
On 31 August 2015, Ngando joined Bastia on a three-year deal.

In 2017, he joined Süper Lig side Göztepe S.K.

Ngando returned to France on 1 August 2019, rejoining Auxerre permanently.

On 30 December 2021, he signed for Ligue 2 side Grenoble.

On 18 September 2023, Ngando joined Azerbaijani club Araz-Naxçıvan PFK, on a one-year deal. On 11 June 2024, Araz-Naxçıvan announced that Ngando had left the club.

== International career ==
Ngando is a France youth international, having represented his country at under-18 through under-21 levels, including winning the 2013 FIFA U-20 World Cup, in which he scored in the penalty shoot-out in the final.

== Personal life ==
He is the nephew of former Cameroon international Patrick Mboma, and is eligible to represent either Cameroon or France at senior level.

== Career statistics ==
=== Club ===
As of 4 October 2023

Appearances and goals by club, season and competition
Club	Season	League			National Cup		League Cup		Total	
Club	Season	Division	Apps	Goals	Apps	Goals	Apps	Goals	Apps	Goals
Rennes B	2010–11	National 2	6	1	—		—		6	1
Rennes B	2012–13	National 3	17	2	—		—		17	2
Rennes B	2014–15	National 3	7	4	—		—		7	4
Rennes B	Total		30	7	0	0	0	0	30	7
Rennes	2012–13	Ligue 1	4	1	0	0	0	0	4	1
Auxerre B (loan)	2013–14	National 3	1	1	—		—		1	1
Auxerre (loan)	2013–14	Ligue 2	25	3	4	1	2	0	31	4
Angers (loan)	2014–15	Ligue 2	19	1	0	0	0	0	19	1
Bastia B	2015–16	National 3	1	1	—		—		1	1
Bastia B	2016–17	National 3	2	0	—		—		2	0
Bastia B	Total		3	1	0	0	0	0	3	1
Bastia	2015–16	Ligue 1	22	2	2	0	1	0	25	2
Bastia	2016–17	Ligue 1	20	0	1	0	0	0	21	0
Bastia	Total		42	2	3	0	1	0	46	2
Göztepe	2017–18	Süper Lig	16	2	1	1	—		17	3
Göztepe	2018–19	Süper Lig	14	1	4	3	—		18	4
Göztepe	Total		30	3	5	4	0	0	35	7
Auxerre	2019–20	Ligue 2	16	5	2	1	1	0	19	6
Auxerre	2020–21	Ligue 2	29	2	2	0	0	0	31	2
Auxerre	Total		45	7	4	1	1	0	50	8
Grenoble	2021–22	Ligue 2	4	0	0	0	0	0	4	0
Grenoble	2022–23	Ligue 2	19	0	0	0	0	0	19	0
Grenoble	Total		23	0	0	0	0	0	23	0
Araz-Naxçıvan	2023–24	Azerbaijan Premier League	2	0	0	0	—		2	0
Career total			228	26	16	6	4	0	248	32

== Honours ==
France U20

- FIFA U-20 World Cup: 2013
