= 2015–16 SC Bastia season =

Sporting Club de Bastia
2015–16 season
- Chairman: Pierre-Marie Geronimi
- Manager: Ghislain Printant
- Stadium: Stade Armand Cesari
- Ligue 1: 13th
- Coupe de France: Round of 32
- Coupe de la Ligue: Round of 32
- Top goalscorer: League: Floyd Ayité (8); All: Floyd Ayité (8)
- Highest home attendance: 14,702 vs Rennes (8 August 2015)
- Lowest home attendance: 2,548 vs Sochaux (18 January 2016)
Home colours	Away colours	Third colours

The 2015–16 SC Bastia season is the 50th consecutive season of the club in the French professional leagues. The club competes in Ligue 1, the Coupe de la Ligue and the Coupe de France.

== Players ==
French teams are limited to four players without EU citizenship. Hence, the squad list includes only the principal nationality of each player; several non-European players on the squad have dual citizenship with an EU country. Also, players from the ACP countries—countries in Africa, the Caribbean, and the Pacific that are signatories to the Cotonou Agreement—are not counted against non-EU quotas due to the Kolpak ruling.

=== Current squad ===
As of 27 January 2016.

Note: Flags indicate national team as defined under FIFA eligibility rules; some limited exceptions apply. Players may hold more than one non-FIFA nationality.

No.	Pos.	Nation	Player
1	GK	DEN	Jesper Hansen
2	FW	GUI	Sadio Diallo
5	DF	FRA	Sébastien Squillaci
6	MF	FRA	Seko Fofana (on loan from Manchester City)
7	MF	TOG	Floyd Ayité
8	MF	FRA	Gaël Danic
9	FW	FRA	Florian Raspentino
11	FW	BRA	Brandão
13	MF	MLI	Abdoulaye Keita
14	MF	ALG	Mehdi Mostefa
15	DF	FRA	Julian Palmieri
16	GK	FRA	Jean-Louis Leca

No.	Pos.	Nation	Player
17	DF	FRA	Mathieu Peybernes
18	MF	FRA	Yannick Cahuzac (captain)
19	MF	FRA	Axel Ngando
20	DF	FRA	François Modesto
22	MF	FRA	Christopher Maboulou
23	DF	FRA	Alexander Djiku
24	DF	MAR	Yassine Jebbour
25	FW	GUI	François Kamano
28	DF	FRA	Florian Marange
29	DF	FRA	Gilles Cioni
30	GK	FRA	Thomas Vincensini
33	MF	MLI	Lassana Coulibaly

=== Out on loan ===
Note: Flags indicate national team as defined under FIFA eligibility rules; some limited exceptions apply. Players may hold more than one non-FIFA nationality.

No.	Pos.	Nation	Player
—	MF	GEO	Luka Kikabidze (on loan to CA Bastia)
—	MF	FRA	Lyes Houri (on loan to Belfort)

No.	Pos.	Nation	Player
—	FW	MLI	Famoussa Koné (on loan to Samsunspor)

== Transfers ==
=== In ===
Date	Pos.	Player	Age	Moved from	Fee	Notes
1 July 2015	MF	(Guinea) Sadio Diallo	24	(France) Rennes	Undisclosed	
7 July 2015	DF	(Morocco) Yassine Jebbour	24	(France) Montpellier	Free Transfer	
18 August 2015	GK	(Denmark) Jesper Hansen	30	(France) Evian	Undisclosed	
27 August 2015	MF	(Algeria) Mehdi Mostefa	31	(France) Lorient	Undisclosed	
31 August 2015	FW	(France) Florian Raspentino	26	(France) Caen	Undisclosed	
31 August 2015	MF	(France) Axel Ngando	22	(France) Rennes	Undisclosed	

=== Loans in ===
Date	Pos.	Player	Age	Loaned from	Return date	Notes
4 January 2016	FW	(Guinea) Mohamed Yattara	22	(Belgium) Standard de Liège	30 June 2016	
8 January 2016	FW	(Algeria) Saïd Benrahma	20	(France) Nice	30 June 2016	
25 January 2016	DF	(France) Grégory Bourillon	31	(France) Reims	30 June 2016	

=== Out ===
Date	Pos.	Player	Age	Moved to	Fee	Notes
1 July 2015	FW	(France) Djibril Cissé	33	(Réunion) JS Saint-Pierroise	Free Transfer	
1 July 2015	MF	(France) Christophe Vincent	22	(France) AC Ajaccio	Free Transfer	
1 July 2015	DF	(France) Romain Achilli	22	Released		
1 July 2015	DF	(Mali) Drissa Diakité	30	Released		
7 July 2015	MF	(Algeria) Ryad Boudebouz	25	(France) Montpellier	€1,700,000	
1 September 2015	MF	(Ivory Coast) Romaric	32	(Cyprus) AC Omonia	Free Transfer	

=== Loans out ===
Date	Pos.	Player	Age	Loaned to	Return date	Notes
10 July 2015	MF	(Georgia (country)) Luka Kikabidze	20	(France) CA Bastia	30 June 2016	
1 August 2015	FW	(Mali) Famoussa Koné	21	(Turkey) Samsunspor	30 June 2016	
25 January 2016	MF	(France) Lyes Houri	20	(France) Belfort	30 June 2016	

== Competitions ==
=== Ligue 1 ===
==== League table ====
Pos	Team	Pld	W	D	L	GF	GA	GD	Pts
8	Rennes	38	13	13	12	52	54	−2	52
9	Angers	38	13	11	14	40	38	+2	50
10	Bastia	38	14	8	16	36	42	−6	50
11	Bordeaux	38	12	14	12	50	57	−7	50
12	Montpellier	38	14	7	17	49	47	+2	49

Source: Ligue 1, Soccerway
Rules for classification: 1) Points; 2) Goal difference; 3) Goals scored; 4) Head-to-head points; 5) Head-to-head goal difference; 6) Fairplay ranking.

==== Results summary ====
Overall								Home						Away					
Pld	W	D	L	GF	GA	GD	Pts	W	D	L	GF	GA	GD	W	D	L	GF	GA	GD
38	14	8	16	36	42	−6	50	11	2	6	23	14	+9	3	6	10	13	28	−15

Last updated: 14 May 2016.
Source: Competitive matches

==== Results by round ====
Round	1	2	3	4	5	6	7	8	9	10	11	12	13	14	15	16	17	18	19	20	21	22	23	24	25	26	27	28	29	30	31	32	33	34	35	36	37	38
Ground	H	A	H	A	A	H	A	H	A	H	A	H	A	H	A	H	H	A	H	A	H	A	H	A	H	A	H	A	H	H	A	H	A	H	A	A	H	A
Result	W	D	W	L	L	L	L	W	L	L	L	W	D	L	D	W	L	D	W	L	W	L	W	L	W	W	D	W	D	L	D	W	L	L	L	D	W	W
Position	4	5	2	6	9	15	16	11	14	15	16	15	15	18	17	16	18	17	16	16	15	15	13	15	14	12	12	11	10	13	11	11	11	12	14	14	14	10

Source: Ligue1
A = Away; H = Home; W = Win; D = Draw; L = Loss

==== Matches ====
Win Draw Loss

8 August 2015 1	Bastia	2–1	Rennes	Furiani
21:00 CEST (UTC+02:00)	Ayité 50'; Kamano 69'; Brandão (red card) 78'	Report	Sio 39', (yellow card) 90+3'	Stadium: Stade Armand Cesari; Attendance: 14,702; Referee: Sébastien Moreira

16 August 2015 2	Lorient	1–1	Bastia	Lorient
17:00 CEST (UTC+02:00)	Moukandjo (yellow card) 59', (goal) 90' (pen.); Mesloub (yellow card) 85'; Fofana (yellow card) 90+2'	Report	Ayité 4'; Marange (yellow card) 28'; Djiku (yellow card) 56'	Stadium: Stade du Moustoir; Attendance: 12,235; Referee: Clément Turpin

22 August 2015 3	Bastia	3–0	Guingamp	Furiani
20:00 CEST (UTC+02:00)	Palmieri 5'; Baca 39' (o.g.); Ayité (yellow card) 53'; Djiku (yellow card) 69'; Coulibaly 90'	Report	Dembélé (yellow card) 51'; Sorbon (yellow card) 61'; De Pauw (yellow card) 83'	Stadium: Stade Armand Cesari; Attendance: 13,966; Referee: Fredy Fautrel

30 August 2015 4	Saint-Étienne	2–1	Bastia	Saint-Étienne
14:00 CEST (UTC+02:00)	Perrin 20'; Eysseric 62'; Clément (yellow card) 82'	Report	Djiku (red card) 4'; Danic 41'; Coulibaly (yellow card) 51'; Kamano (red card) 74'	Stadium: Stade Geoffroy-Guichard; Attendance: 26,249; Referee: Antony Gautier

13 September 2015 5	Marseille	4–1	Bastia	Marseille
21:00 CEST (UTC+02:00)	Mendy 15'; Barrada (yellow card) 30'; Rekik (yellow card) 37'; Alessandrini 46', 66'; Batshuayi 70'	Report	Palmieri (yellow card) 34'; Brandão 78'	Stadium: Stade Vélodrome; Attendance: 46,280; Referee: Nicolas Rainville

19 September 2015 6	Bastia	1–3	Nice	Furiani
20:00 CEST (UTC+02:00)	Danic 24'; Marange (yellow card) 87'	Report	N. Mendy 33'; Germain 40'; Mallmann (yellow card) 85'; Pied (yellow card) 86'; Benrahma 90+4'	Stadium: Stade Armand Cesari; Attendance: 12,945; Referee: Wilfried Bien

23 September 2015 7	Lyon	2–0	Bastia	Lyon
19:00 CEST (UTC+02:00)	Kalulu 18'; Umtiti (yellow card) 45'; Biševac (yellow card) 53'; Tolisso 88'	Report	Kamano (red card) 45'; Cahuzac (yellow card) 69'	Stadium: Stade de Gerland; Attendance: 25,658; Referee: Benoit Bastien

26 September 2015 8	Bastia	3–0	Toulouse	Furiani
20:00 CEST (UTC+02:00)	Cahuzac (yellow card) 2'; Palmieri 8'; Squillaci 31', 43'; Mostefa (yellow card) 38'; Marange (yellow card) 86'	Report	Regattin (yellow card) 2'; Spajić (yellow card) 49'; Blin (yellow card) 59'	Stadium: Stade Armand Cesari; Attendance: 10,658; Referee: Hakim Ben El Hadj

3 October 2015 9	Angers	1–0	Bastia	Angers
20:00 CEST (UTC+02:00)	Ketkeophomphone 41'; Thomas (yellow card) 71'	Report	Mostefa (yellow card) 43'; Diallo (yellow card) 87'	Stadium: Stade Jean-Bouin; Attendance: 11,445; Referee: Sébastien Moreira

17 October 2015 10	Bastia	0–2	Paris Saint-Germain	Furiani
17:00 CEST (UTC+02:00)	Danic (yellow card) 29'; Ngando (yellow card) 38'; Cahuzac (yellow card) 47'	Report	Marquinhos (yellow card) 44'; Ibrahimović 72', 83'	Stadium: Stade Armand Cesari; Attendance: 13,066; Referee: Lionel Jaffredo

24 October 2015 11	Montpellier	2–0	Bastia	Montpellier
20:00 CEST (UTC+02:00)	Deplagne (yellow card) 58'; Boudebouz 63'; Ninga 88'	Report	Peybernes (yellow card) 54'; Ngando (yellow card) 75'; Cahuzac (yellow card) 82'	Stadium: Stade de la Mosson; Attendance: 12,240; Referee: Jérôme Miguelgorry

31 October 2015 12	Bastia	1–0	Caen	Furiani
20:00 CET (UTC+01:00)	Diallo 31'; Cahuzac (yellow card) 58'	Report	Yahia (yellow card) 43'; Da Silva (yellow card) 55'	Stadium: Stade Armand Cesari; Attendance: 10,386; Referee: Benoît Millot

7 November 2015 13	Lille	1–1	Bastia	Lille
20:00 CET (UTC+01:00)	Guirassy (yellow card) 37'; Boufal (red card) 82'; Sidibé 87'	Report	Cioni (yellow card) 27'; Danic (yellow card) 40'; Palmieri (yellow card) 62'; Danic 73'	Stadium: Stade Pierre-Mauroy; Attendance: 30,852; Referee: Mikael Lesage

22 November 2015 14	Bastia	1–2	Gazélec Ajaccio	Furiani
14:00 CET (UTC+01:00)	Brandão 5'; Leca (yellow card) 18'; Cahuzac (yellow card) 69'	Report	Zoua 19' (pen.); Boutaïb 70'; Ducourtioux (yellow card) 70'	Stadium: Stade Armand Cesari; Attendance: 11,985; Referee: Benoît Millot

28 November 2015 15	Nantes	0–0	Bastia	Nantes
20:00 CET (UTC+01:00)	Cana (yellow card) 14'; Bedoya (yellow card) 59' (yellow-red card) 90+2'; Moimbé (yellow card) 78'	Report	Cahuzac (yellow card) 59'; Danic (yellow card) 82'	Stadium: Stade de la Beaujoire; Attendance: 25,978; Referee: Nicolas Rainville

2 December 2015 16	Bastia	1–0	Bordeaux	Furiani
19:00 CET (UTC+01:00)	Palmieri (yellow card) 51'; Raspentino 88', (yellow card) 89'	Report	Plašil (yellow card) 62'	Stadium: Stade Armand Cesari; Attendance: 10,135; Referee: Fredy Fautrel

5 December 2015 17	Bastia	1–2	AS Monaco	Furiani
20:00 CET (UTC+01:00)	Danic (yellow card) 33'; Mostefa 42'; Raspentino (yellow card) 42'; Romain 90'	Report	Dirar (yellow card) 42'; L. Traoré 72', 84'	Stadium: Stade Armand Cesari; Attendance: 10,596; Referee: Ruddy Buquet

12 December 2015 18	Troyes AC	1–1	Bastia	Troyes
20:00 CET (UTC+01:00)	Jean (yellow card) 39'; Cabot 59'; Martins Pereira (yellow card) 63'	Report	Fofana 23'; Palmieri (yellow card) 26'; Squillaci (yellow card) 42'; Modesto (yellow card) 56'; Peybernes (yellow card) 87'	Stadium: Stade de l'Aube; Attendance: 10,117; Referee: Stéphane Lannoy

19 December 2015 19	Bastia	2–0	Reims	Furiani
20:00 CET (UTC+01:00)	Ayité 21'; Cabot 59'; Martins Pereira (yellow card) 63'	Report	Tacalfred (yellow card) 71'	Stadium: Stade Armand Cesari; Attendance: 10,528; Referee: Saïd Ennjimi

8 January 2016 20	Paris Saint-Germain	2–0	Bastia	Paris
20:30 CET (UTC+01:00)	Motta 29'; Maxwell 39'; Verratti (yellow card) 45'	Report	Squillaci (yellow card) 54'; Marange (yellow card) 71'; Fofana (yellow card) 74'	Stadium: Parc des Princes; Attendance: 44,879; Referee: Sébastien Moreira

16 January 2016 21	Bastia	1–0	Montpellier	Furiani
20:00 CET (UTC+01:00)	Brandão (yellow card) 31'; Ayité 48'; Djiku (yellow card) 59'; Fofana (red card) 65'; Modesto (yellow card) 90'	Report	Deplagne (yellow card) 41'; Congré (red card) 68'	Stadium: Stade Armand Cesari; Attendance: 10,337; Referee: Frank Schneider

23 January 2016 22	Guingamp	1–0	Bastia	Guingamp
20:00 CET (UTC+01:00)	Kerbrat (yellow card) 26'; Giresse 90+4' (pen.)	Report	Danic (yellow card) 25'; Ayite (red card) 68'; Palmieri (yellow card) 90+2'; Cahuzac (red card) 90+2'	Stadium: Stade du Roudourou; Attendance: 14,065; Referee: Mikael Lesage

30 January 2016 23	Bastia	1–0	Lyon	Furiani
20:00 CET (UTC+01:00)	Kamano (yellow card) 26'; Ngando (yellow card) 67'; Brandão 69' (yellow card) 75'; Cioni (red card) 88'	Report	Tolisso (yellow card) 31'; Umtiti (yellow card) 89'	Stadium: Stade Armand Cesari; Attendance: 10,908; Referee: Benoît Millot

2 February 2016 24	Monaco	2–0	Bastia	Fontvieille
19:00 CET (UTC+1)	Fabinho (yellow card) 30'; Modesto 35' (o.g.); Pašalić (yellow card) 61'; Silva 75'	Report	Diallo (yellow card) 66'	Stadium: Stade Louis II; Attendance: 5,607; Referee: Nicolas Rainville

6 February 2016 25	Bastia	2–0	Troyes	Furiani
20:00 CET (UTC+1)	Ayité 10', 83'; Leca (red card) 48'	Report	Nivet (yellow card) 4'; Perea (red card) 60'; Camus (red card) 80'; Mavinga (yellow card) 86'	Stadium: Stade Armand Cesari; Attendance: 10,441; Referee: Sébastien Moreira

13 February 2016 26	Reims	0–1	Bastia	Reims
20:00 CET (UTC+1)	Traoré (yellow card) 24'; Oniangue (yellow card) 54'; Bangoura (yellow card) 63'; Bifouma (yellow card) 88'; Rigonato (yellow card) 90'	Report	Cahuzac (yellow card) 26'; Mostefa (yellow card) 38'; Palmieri (yellow card) 45'; Traoré 48' (o.g.)	Stadium: Stade Auguste Delaune; Attendance: 11,335; Referee: Lionel Jaffredo

26 February 2016 28	Nice	0–2	Bastia	Nice
20:30 CET (UTC+1)	Koziello (yellow card) 17'; Le Marchand (yellow card) 56'; Baysse (red card) 58'; Traoré (yellow card) 67'	Report	Mostefa (yellow card) 25'; Modesto (yellow card) 27'; Cahuzac (yellow card) 57'; Diallo 61'; Ayité 64'; Danic (yellow card) 70'; Djiku (yellow card) 73'	Stadium: Allianz Riviera; Attendance: 14,541; Referee: Antony Gautier

5 March 2016 29	Bastia	0–0	Lorient	Furiani
20:00 CET (UTC+1)	Mostefa (yellow card) 36'; Leca (yellow card) 87'; Cahuzac (yellow card) 88'	Report	Bellugou (yellow card) 45'; Abdullah (yellow card) 65'; Barthelme (yellow card) 68'; Guerreiro (yellow card) 88'	Stadium: Stade Armand Cesari; Attendance: 10,586; Referee: Jérôme Miguelgorry

9 March 2016 27	Bastia	0–0	Nantes	Furiani
18:30 CET (UTC+1)	Modesto (yellow card) 56'	Report	Sabaly (yellow card) 19'; Iloki (yellow card) 43'; Sigþórsson 77'; Bammou 84'	Stadium: Stade Armand Cesari; Attendance: 11,071; Referee: Sébastien Moreira

12 March 2016 30	Bastia	1–2	Lille	Furiani
20:00 CET (UTC+1)	Mostefa (yellow card) 8'; Squillaci (yellow card) 64'; Danic 90+2'	Report	Boufal (yellow card) 36' (goal) 37'; Obbadi (yellow card) 45'; Soumaoro (yellow card) 50'; Amadou 59'	Stadium: Stade Armand Cesari; Attendance: 10,727; Referee: Saïd Ennjimi

20 March 2016 31	Bordeaux	1–1	Bastia	Bordeaux
20:00 CET (UTC+01:00)	Enzo Crivelli (yellow card) 43'; Crivelli (yellow card) 45'; Contento 82'	Report	Peybernes (yellow card) 45'; Fofana (yellow card) 54'; Ngando 84'	Stadium: Matmut Atlantique; Attendance: 21,927; Referee: Tony Chapron

3 April 2016 32	Bastia	2–1	Marseille	Bastia
20:00 CET (UTC+01:00)	Mostefa (yellow card) 4'; Palmieri (yellow card) 32'; Reik 47' (o.g.); Danic 56'; Djiku (yellow card) 87'	Report	Diarra (yellow card) 22'; Mandanda (yellow card) 55'; Batshuayi 77'; Alessandrini (red card) 85'	Stadium: Stade Armand Césari; Attendance: 13,141; Referee: Lionel Jaffredo

9 April 2016 33	Toulouse	4–0	Bastia	Toulouse
20:00 CET (UTC+2)	Ben Yedder 57', 80'; Braithwaite 62'; Doumbia (yellow card) 67'; Trejo 70'	Report	Cahuzac (red card) 67'	Stadium: Stadium Municipal; Attendance: 17,407; Referee: Ruddy Buquet

16 April 2016 34	Bastia	0–1	Saint-Étienne	Bastia
20:00 CET (UTC+01:00)	Danic (yellow card) 24'; Mostefa (yellow card) 62'; Palmieri (yellow card) 70'	Report	Tannane (yellow card) 61'; Pajot (yellow card) 73'; Roux 75'	Stadium: Stade Armand Cesari; Attendance: 11,631; Referee: Benoît Millot

24 April 2016 35	Gazélec Ajaccio	3–2	Bastia	Ajaccio
17:00 CET (UTC+01:00)	Ducourtioux (yellow card) 15'; Boutaïb 20'; Pujol 37', (yellow card) 76'; Larbi 63' (pen.); Lemoigne (yellow card) 90+1'; Đoković (yellow card) 90+3'	Report	Ngando 9'; Cahuzac (yellow card) 62', (goal) 77'; Cioni (yellow card) 90+3'	Stadium: Stade Ange Casanova; Attendance: 4,104; Referee: Sébastien Moreira

30 April 2016 36	Caen	0–0	Bastia	Caen
19:00 CET (UTC+01:00)	Diomande (yellow card) 75'	Report	Modesto (yellow card) 40'; Kamano (yellow card) 63'; Marange (yellow card) 73'	Stadium: Stade Michel d'Ornano; Attendance: 17,016; Referee: Jérôme Miguelgorry

7 May 2016 37	Bastia	1–0	Angers	Bastia
21:00 CET (UTC+01:00)	Cahuzac 43', (yellow card) 55'	Report	Angoula (yellow card) 73'	Stadium: Stade Armand Cesari; Attendance: 11,817; Referee: Stéphane Lannoy

14 May 2016 38	Rennes	v	Bastia	Rennes
21:00 CET (UTC+01:00)				Stadium: Roazhon Park

=== Coupe de France ===
2 January 2016 Round of 64	Sedan	0–2	Bastia	Sedan
20:45 CET (UTC+01:00)		Report	Ngando (yellow card) 2'; Ismael Diallo (yellow card) 35'; Modesto (yellow card) 54'; Brandão 66'; Coulibaly (yellow card) 69'; Cioni (yellow card) 90'; Danic 90'	Stadium: Stade Louis Dugauguez; Attendance: 6,421; Referee: Frank Schneider

18 January 2016 Round of 32	Bastia	1–2	Sochaux	Furiani
17:30 CET (UTC+01:00)	Kamano 36'	Report	Teikeu 27'; Cacérès 90'	Stadium: Stade Armand Cesari; Attendance: 2,548; Referee: Armand Cesari

=== Coupe de la Ligue ===
27 October 2015 Round of 32	Bastia	0–1	Rennes	Furiani
21:00 CET (UTC+01:00)	Coulibaly (yellow card) 40'; Peybernes (yellow card) 60'	Report	Mendes (yellow card) 27'; Doucouré 59'	Stadium: Stade Armand Cesari; Attendance: 3,048; Referee: Stéphane Lannoy
