= Julien Romain =

French footballer (born 1996)

Personal information
- Date of birth: 23 February 1996 (age 30)
- Place of birth: Bastia, France
- Height: 1.84 m (6 ft 0 in)
- Position: Midfielder

Team information
- Current team: Furiani-Agliani

Youth career
- –2014: Bastia

Senior career*
Years	Team	Apps	(Gls)
2014–2018	Bastia	16	(3)
2016	→ Gazélec Ajaccio (loan)	11	(0)
2017	→ Pau FC (loan)	14	(4)
2018–2019	Bergerac Foot	0	(0)
2020–	Furiani-Agliani	3	(3)
- * Club domestic league appearances and goals as of 15:55, 12 February 2021 (UTC)

Julien Romain (born 23 February 1996) is a French professional footballer who plays as a midfielder for Furiani-Agliani.

== Career ==
Romain is a youth exponent from SC Bastia. He made his Ligue 1 debut in a 1–2 home defeat against Evian at 3 December 2014.

Romain scored his debut goal in his first appearance of the 2015–2016 season in a 1–2 home defeat to Monaco.

Having spent the first half of the 2016–17 season on loan at Ligue 2 team Gazélec Ajaccio, he was loaned out to Championnat National side Pau FC for the second half of the season.

Romain remained at Bastia for the 2017–18 season, despite administrative relegation to Championnat National 3. A serious ankle injury in January 2018 ruled him out for the rest of the season. He moved to Bergerac in Championnat National 2 for the 2018–19 season, but didn't play any games and was released at the end of the season. In January 2019 he started training with Furiani-Agliani to aide his recuperation. He eventually signed for the club in June 2020.

== Career statistics ==
As of match played 25 November 2016

Appearances and goals by club, season and competition
Club	Season	League			Coupe de France		Coupe de la Ligue		Continental		Others		Total	
Club	Season	Division	App	Goals	App	Goals	App	Goals	App	Goals	App	Goals	App	Goals
Bastia	2014–15	Ligue 1	1	0	0	0	0	0	–	–	–	–	1	0
Bastia	2015–16	Ligue 1	5	2	2	0	0	0	–	–	–	–	7	2
Bastia	Total		6	2	2	0	0	0	0	0	0	0	8	2
Gazélec Ajaccio	2016–17	Ligue 2	11	0	1	0	0	0	–	–	–	–	12	0
Career total			17	2	3	0	0	0	0	0	0	0	20	2
