= Baboye Traoré =

French footballer (born 1990)

Personal information
- Full name: Baboye Traoré
- Date of birth: 25 January 1990 (age 36)
- Place of birth: Paris, France
- Height: 1.85 m (6 ft 1 in)
- Position: Midfielder

Team information
- Current team: USL Dunkerque
- Number: 20

Senior career*
Years	Team	Apps	(Gls)
2011–2016	Paris FC B	12	(2)
2011–2017	Paris FC	88	(4)
2017	Sutton United	1	(0)
2018	Paris FC B	16	(0)
2018	Paris FC	0	(0)
2018–	Dunkerque	9	(0)
- * Club domestic league appearances and goals as of 21:13, 17 August 2017

Baboye Traoré (born 25 January 1990) is a French footballer who currently plays for Dunkerque after spending most of his career at Paris FC.

In 2017, Traoré had a short spell in England with Sutton United. He made his league debut on 21 January 2017 as a substitute against Eastleigh. On 29 January 2017 he was a 91st-minute substitute coming on for Craig Eastmond in Sutton's 1-0 FA Cup fourth round giant-killing victory over Championship side Leeds United.

== Personal life ==
Traoré is one of 13 siblings. He was born in Paris, France and holds French and Malian nationalities.
