= Paul Charruau =

French professional footballer (born 1993)

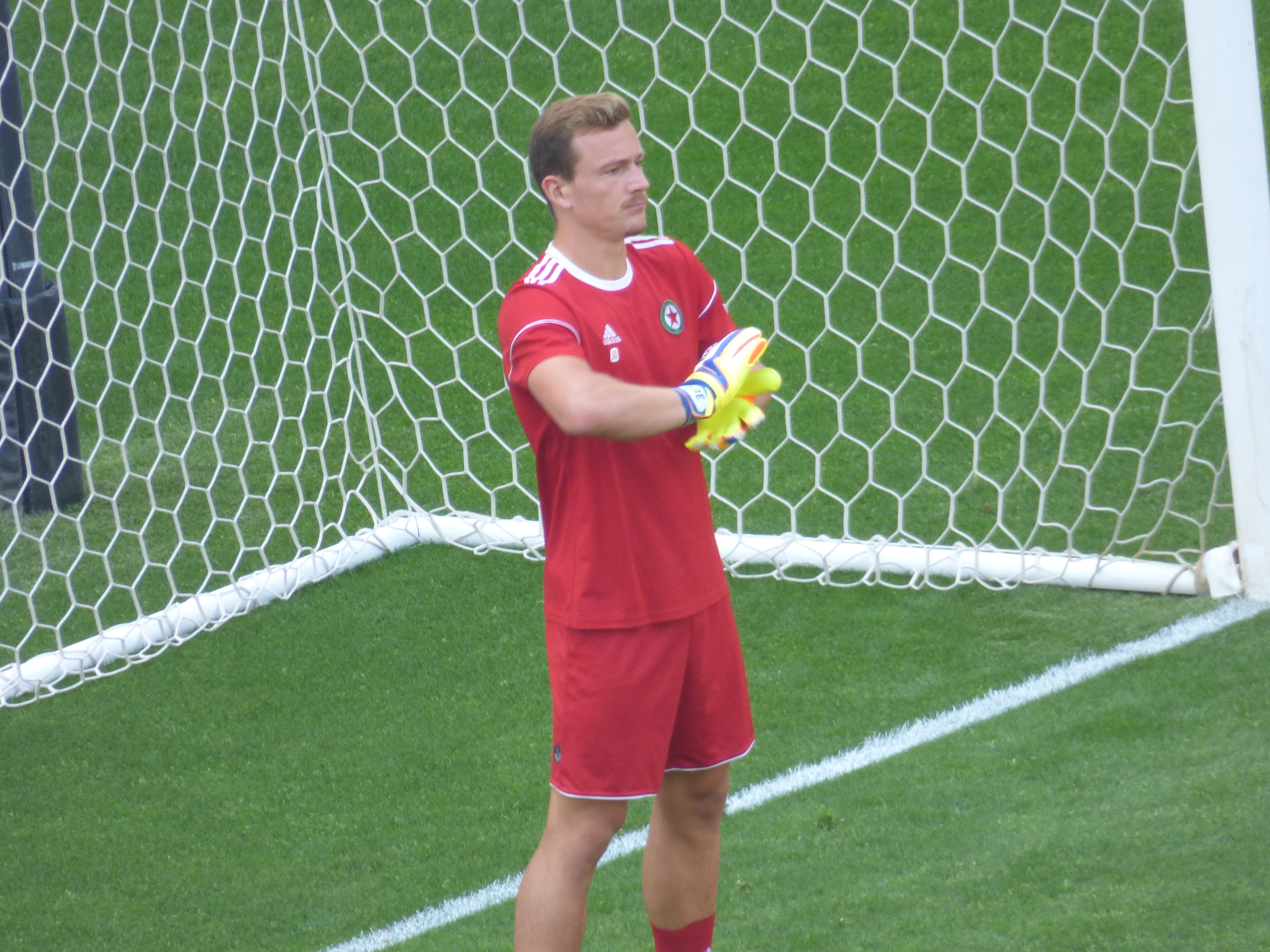

Personal information
- Full name: Paul Charruau
- Date of birth: 12 July 1993 (age 33)
- Place of birth: Paris, France
- Height: 1.86 m (6 ft 1 in)
- Position: Goalkeeper

Youth career
- 2000–2006: US Ville-d'Avray
- 2006–2008: ACBB
- 2008–2009: Clairefontaine
- 2009–2013: Valenciennes

Senior career*
Years	Team	Apps	(Gls)
2011–2015	Valenciennes B	63	(0)
2011–2016	Valenciennes	19	(0)
2016–2017	Bastia	1	(0)
2017	→ Paris FC (loan)	0	(0)
2017	→ Paris FC B (loan)	2	(0)
2018–2022	Red Star	63	(0)
2022–2023	Amiens	0	(0)

International career
2011	France U18	1	(0)
2011	France U19	1	(0)
2013	France U20	1	(0)
- * Club domestic league appearances and goals

Paul Charruau (born 12 July 1993) is a French former professional footballer who played as a goalkeeper.

== Club career ==
Born in Paris, Charruau joined Valenciennes FC's youth setup in 2009. He first appeared as a senior with the reserves in 2011, and signed a professional deal on 30 May 2013.

Charruau made his professional debut on 29 August, starting in a 2–1 away win against AJ Auxerre for the Ligue 2 championship.

In July 2016, Charruau signed a two-year deal with SC Bastia. In January 2017 he was loaned to Paris FC in a swap deal for Alexis Thébaux, with SC Bastia manager François Ciccolini stating in a press conference that this was a disciplinary matter.

In June 2017, SC Bastia were administratively relegated to Championnat National and Charruau left the club. He signed for Red Star in February 2018, having been without a club in the intervening period.

On 29 June 2022, Charruau joined Amiens on a one-season deal. At the end of the 2022–23 season, Amiens did not renew Charruau's contract, as they planned on having youngster Matthieu Rongier as Régis Gurtner's understudy.

== Career statistics ==
=== Club ===
As of 5 October 2023

Club	Season	League			National Cup		League Cup		Total	
Club	Season	Division	Apps	Goals	Apps	Goals	Apps	Goals	Apps	Goals
Valenciennes B	2011–12	National 2	15	0	—		—		15	0
Valenciennes B	2012–13	National 2	23	0	—		—		23	0
Valenciennes B	2013–14	National 3	15	0	—		—		15	0
Valenciennes B	2014–15	National 3	4	0	—		—		4	0
Valenciennes B	2015–16	National 3	6	0	—		—		6	0
Valenciennes B	Total		63	0	0	0	0	0	63	0
Valenciennes	2014–15	Ligue 2	15	0	3	0	0	0	18	0
Valenciennes	2015–16	Ligue 2	4	0	1	0	1	0	6	0
Valenciennes	Total		19	0	4	0	1	0	24	0
Bastia	2016–17	Ligue 1	1	0	0	0	0	0	1	0
Bastia B	2016–17	National 3	2	0	—		—		2	0
Paris FC (loan)	2016–17	National 1	0	0	0	0	0	0	0	0
Paris FC B (loan)	2016–17	National 3	2	0	—		—		2	0
Red Star	2017–18	National 1	0	0	0	0	0	0	0	0
Red Star	2018–19	Ligue 2	1	0	0	0	1	0	2	0
Red Star	2019–20	National 1	23	0	0	0	0	0	23	0
Red Star	2020–21	National 1	27	0	0	0	0	0	27	0
Red Star	2021–22	National 1	12	0	1	0	0	0	13	0
Red Star	Total		63	0	1	0	1	0	65	0
Amiens	2022–23	Ligue 2	0	0	3	0	0	0	3	0
Career total			150	0	8	0	2	0	160	0
