= Lenny Nangis =

Guadeloupean footballer (born 1994)

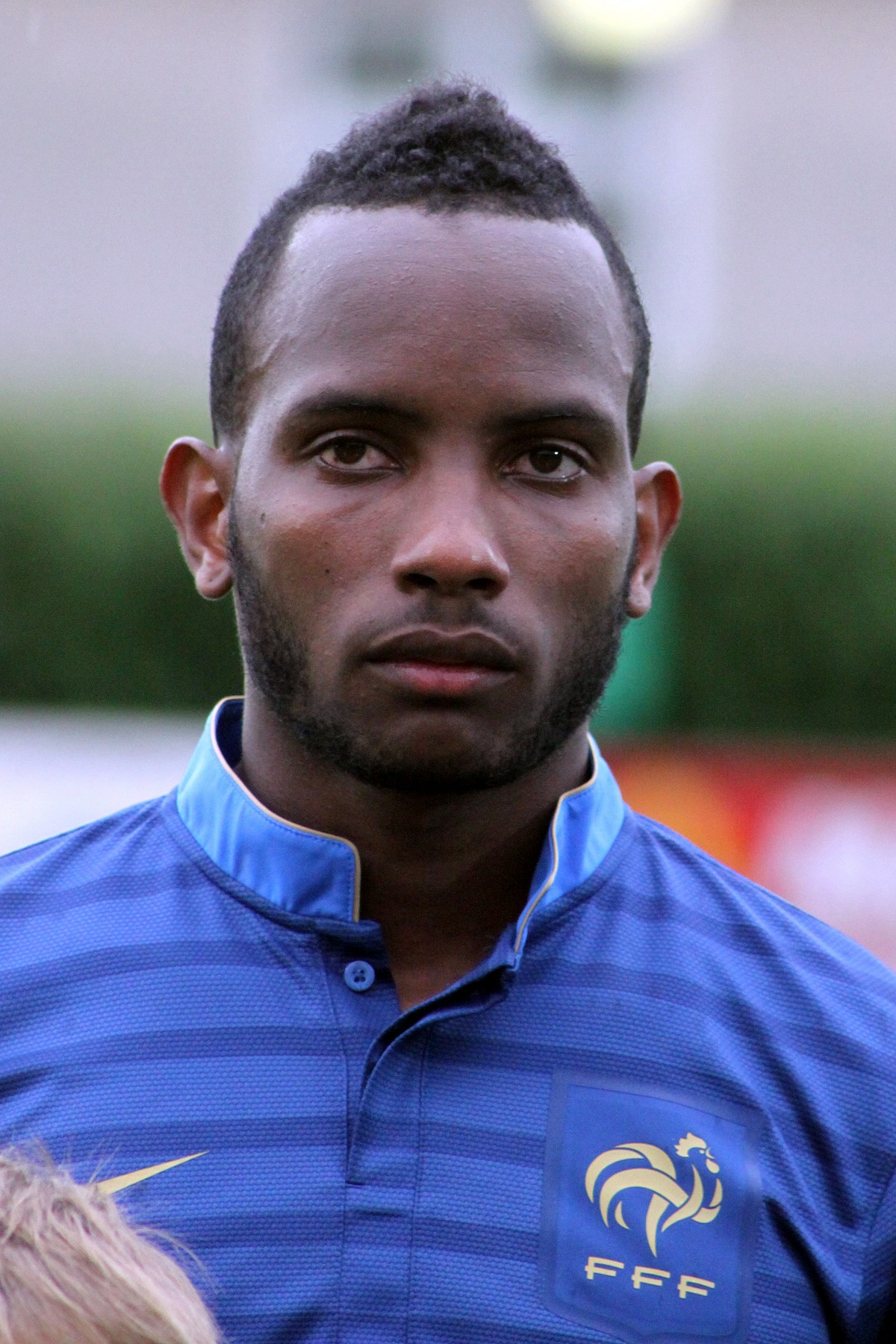
- Nangis with the France U19 national team in June 2013

Personal information
- Full name: Lenny Loic Nangis
- Date of birth: 24 March 1994 (age 32)
- Place of birth: Basse-Terre, Guadeloupe
- Height: 1.72 m (5 ft 8 in)
- Position: Winger

Team information
- Current team: F.C. Kiryat Yam
- Number: 10

Youth career
- 2000–2001: Cygne Noir Basse-Terre
- 2002–2009: Juvenis
- 2009–2011: Caen

Senior career*
Years	Team	Apps	(Gls)
2010–2014	Caen B	47	(14)
2011–2015	Caen	76	(7)
2015–2017	Lille	10	(0)
2016–2017	→ Bastia (loan)	30	(0)
2017–2018	Valenciennes	21	(0)
2018–2019	Levadiakos	26	(1)
2019	Sarpsborg 08	0	(0)
2020–2022	RWDM	45	(5)
2022–2024	Nancy	60	(4)
2024–2025	Paris 13 Atletico	10	(1)
2025	Bnei Sakhnin	12	(0)
2025–2026	F.C. Ashdod	9	(0)
2026–	F.C. Kiryat Yam	15	(0)

International career^{‡}
2009–2010	France U16	11	(6)
2010–2011	France U17	20	(9)
2011–2012	France U18	5	(1)
2012–2013	France U19	14	(1)
2013–2014	France U20	10	(2)
2015	France U21	4	(0)
2018–	Guadeloupe	4	(0)
- * Club domestic league appearances and goals as of 24 June 2026 ‡ National team caps and goals as of 8 September 2020

Lenny Loic Nangis (born 24 March 1994) is a Guadeloupean professional footballer who plays as a winger for Israeli Premier League club F.C. Kiryat Yam. Nangis was a France youth international having represented his nation at under-16 and under-17 level.

== Club career ==
On 19 August 2011, Nangis signed his first professional contract agreeing to a three-year deal. He was, subsequently, promoted to the senior team by manager Franck Dumas and assigned the number 15 shirt. Nangis made his professional debut on 31 August in a 3–2 Coupe de la Ligue victory over Brest appearing as a half-time substitute. On 1 August 2016, Nangis joined Bastia on a season-long loan deal. On 2 September 2017, he signed with Valenciennes for three years.

In July 2021, it was announced that Nangis had signed with Belgian club RWDM.

On 30 June 2022, Nangis signed a two-year contract with Nancy.

== International career ==
Nangis played with the under-17 team at the 2011 FIFA U-17 World Cup scoring one goal.

On 23 March 2018, Nangis made his debut for the Guadeloupe national football team in a friendly 1–0 loss to Trinidad and Tobago.
