= Daouda Konaté =

Ivorian footballer

Personal information
- Date of birth: 14 December 1991 (age 34)
- Place of birth: Yopougon, Côte d'Ivoire
- Height: 1.75 m (5 ft 9 in)
- Position: Defender

Team information
- Current team: FC Fleury 91

Senior career*
Years	Team	Apps	(Gls)
2012–2013	Maccabi Paris	32	(0)
2013–2016	Paris	53	(0)
2015–2016	→ Dunkerque (loan)	14	(0)
2016–2018	Tours	6	(0)
2017–2018	→ Pau (loan)	10	(0)
2018–	FC Fleury 91	0	(0)
- * Club domestic league appearances and goals as of 00:15, 5 August 2018 (UTC)

Daouda Konaté (born 14 December 1991) is an Ivorian professional footballer who currently plays for French club FC Fleury 91 as a defender.

== Career statistics ==
As of 19 August 2016.

Appearances and goals by club, season and competition
Club	Division	Season	League		Cup		League Cup		Total	
Club	Division	Season	Apps	Goals	Apps	Goals	Apps	Goals	Apps	Goals
Maccabi Paris	CFA Group B	2012–13	32	0	0	0	-	-	32	0
Paris	National	2013–14	22	0	2	0	-	-	24	0
Paris	National	2014–15	31	0	3	0	-	-	34	0
Paris	Ligue 2	2015–16	0	0	1	0	0	0	1	0
Dunkerque (loan)	National	2015–16	14	0	1	0	-	-	15	0
Tours	Ligue 2	2016–17	2	0	0	0	1	0	3	0
Career totals			101	0	7	0	1	0	109	0
