= Nicolas Saint-Ruf =

Guadeloupean footballer (born 1992)

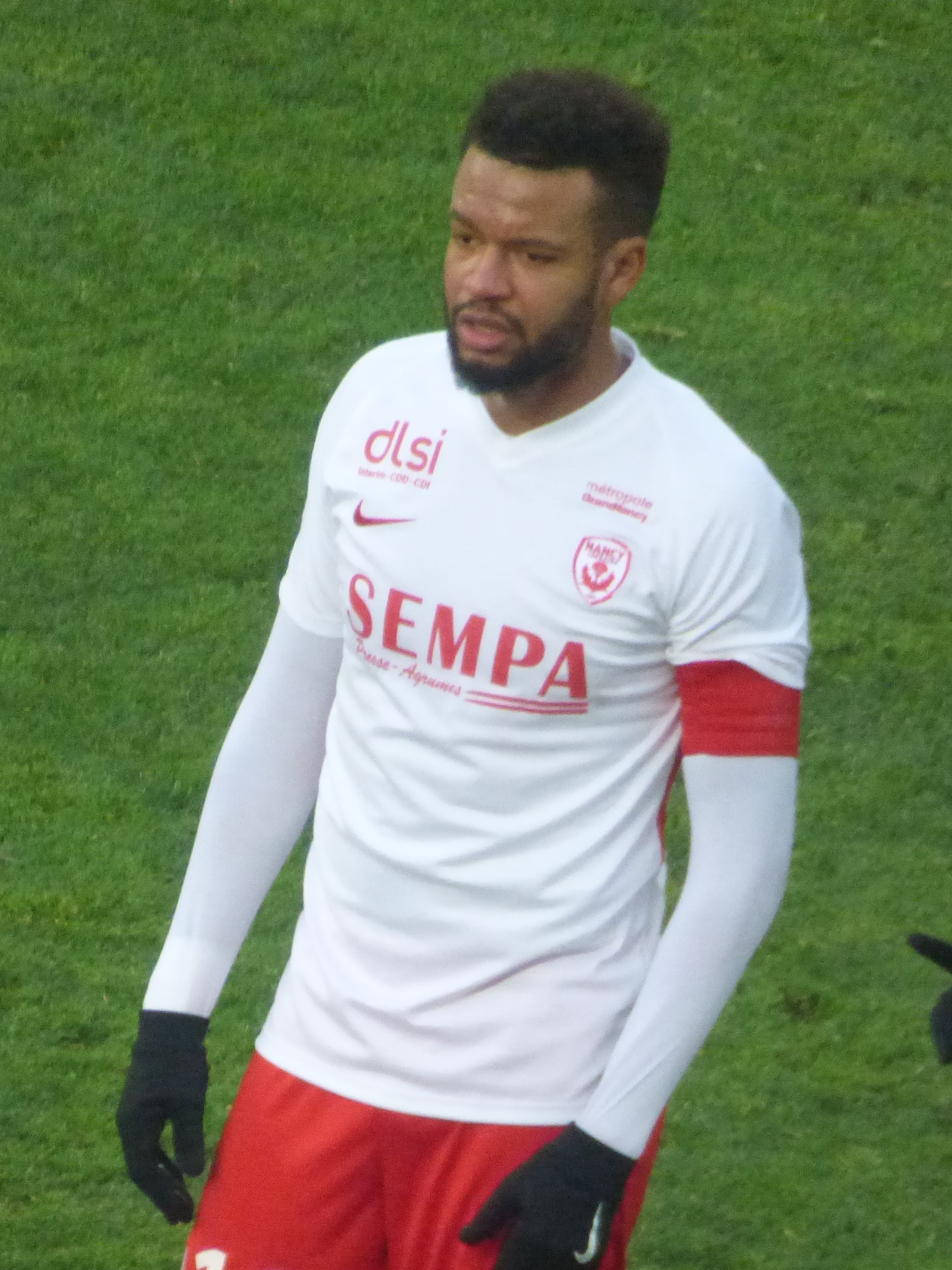
- Saint-Ruf with Nancy in 2019

Personal information
- Date of birth: 24 October 1992 (age 34)
- Place of birth: Rouen, France
- Height: 1.87 m (6 ft 2 in)
- Position: Centre-back

Team information
- Current team: Nancy
- Number: 14

Youth career
- 2010–2011: Lens B

Senior career*
Years	Team	Apps	(Gls)
2011–2014	Lens	19	(0)
2014–2015	Montpellier B	28	(2)
2015–2016	→ Orléans	37	(1)
2016–2017	Montpellier	10	(0)
2017	Bastia	5	(0)
2017–2019	Nancy	21	(0)
2018	→ Bourg-en-Bresse (loan)	13	(1)
2019–2024	Orléans	120	(10)
2024–	Nancy	57	(9)

International career
2022	Guadeloupe	4	(0)
- * Club domestic league appearances and goals as of 12 May 2026

Nicolas Saint-Ruf (born 24 October 1992) is a professional footballer who plays as a centre-back for Ligue 2 club Nancy. Born in metropolitan France, he plays for the Guadeloupe national team.

== International career ==
Born in metropolitan France, Saint-Ruf is of Guadeloupean descent. He was called up to represent the Guadeloupe national team for a pair of friendlies in March 2022.

== Honours ==
Nancy

- Championnat National: 2024–25
