= Alexis Thébaux =

French footballer (born 1985)

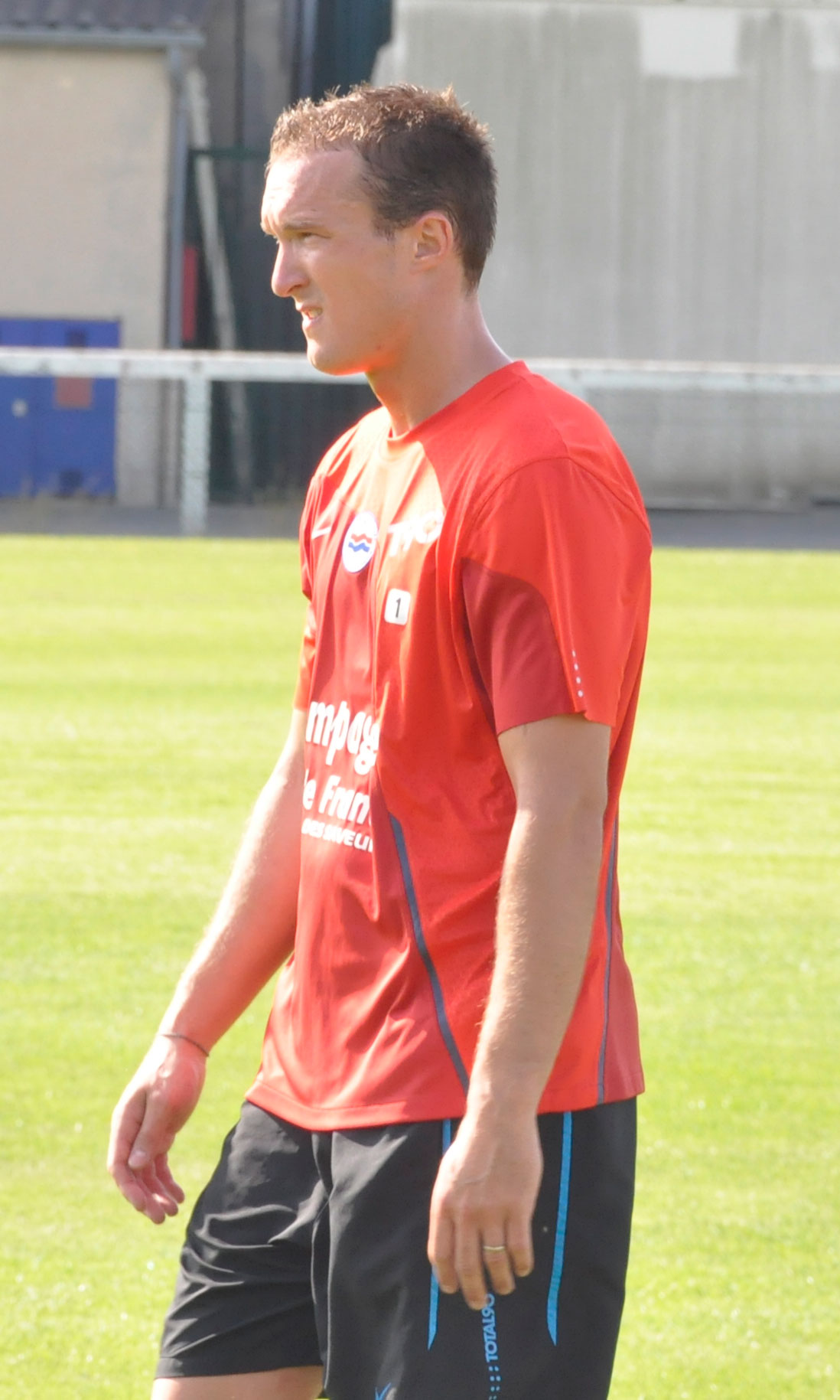
- Thébaux in 2010

Personal information
- Full name: Alexis Alain Donatien Thébaux
- Date of birth: 17 March 1985 (age 41)
- Place of birth: Les Sables d'Olonne, France
- Height: 1.85 m (6 ft 1 in)
- Position: Goalkeeper

Team information
- Current team: Thonon Evian

Youth career
- 2001-2004: Nantes

Senior career*
Years	Team	Apps	(Gls)
2004-2005	Nantes	1	(0)
2005-2006	Cherbourg	18	(0)
2006-2007	Dijon	0	(0)
2007-2012	Caen	115	(0)
2012-2015	Brest	109	(0)
2015-2017	Paris FC	45	(0)
2017	Bastia	1	(0)
2018-2023	Thonon Evian	24+ (Note: Statistics are missing for the 2018–19 and 2019–20 seasons.)	(0+)

International career
2005	France U21		
- * Club domestic league appearances and goals as of 18:37, 7 June 2022 (UTC)

Alexis Alain Donatien Thébaux (born 17 March 1985) is a French professional footballer who plays as a goalkeeper for Championnat National 1 club Thonon Evian.

== Career ==
Thébaux was born Les Sables d'Olonne. He started his career at Nantes in 2001 at the age of 16. In the summer transfer window of 2012, he moved to Brest as a replacement for Steeve Elana, who had departed that transfer window for Lille.

== Honours ==
Thonon Evian

- Championnat National 3: 2021-22
- Régional 1 Auvergne-Rhône-Alpes: 2019-20
- Régional 2 Auvergne-Rhône-Alpes: 2018-19
