= 1999–2000 SC Bastia season =

SC Bastia
1999–2000 season
- Chairman: François Nicolaï
- Manager: Frédéric Antonetti
- Stadium: Stade Armand Cesari
- Division 1: 10th
- Coupe de France: End of 64
- Coupe de la Ligue: Semi final
- Top goalscorer: League: Frédéric Née (11); All: Frédéric Née (12)
- Highest home attendance: 9,835 vs Paris SG (30 April 2000)
- Lowest home attendance: 5,056 vs Sedan (26 January 2000)
- Average home league attendance: 6,915
| Home colours | Away colours |

French football club SC Bastia's 1999–2000 season. Finished 10th place in league. Top scorer of the season, including 12 goals in 11 league matches have been Frédéric Née. Was eliminated to Coupe de France end of 64, the Coupe de la Ligue was able to be among the semi-final.

== Transfers ==
=== In ===
Summer

- Ousmane Soumah from Lorient
- Dan Petersen from Anderlecht
- Zoumana Camara from Empoli
- Piotr Świerczewski from Gamba Osaka
- Lilian Nalis from Le Havre
- Yann Lachuer from Paris SG

=== Out ===
Summer

- François Modesto to Cagliari
- Nebojša Krupniković to OFK Belgrade
- Andrés Grande to Ferro Carril Oeste
- Mariusz Piekarski to Legia Warszawa
- Paulo Alves to Uniao Leiria
- Laurent Fournier to retired
- Sébastien Perez to Marseille

Winter

- No.

== Squad ==
As of 30 June 2012

Note: Flags indicate national team as defined under FIFA eligibility rules; some limited exceptions apply. Players may hold more than one non-FIFA nationality.

| No. | Pos. | Nation | Player |
|---|---|---|---|
| 1 | GK | (France) FRA | Eric Durand |
| 2 | DF | (France) FRA | Patrick Valery |
| 3 | DF | (Guinea) GUI | Morlaye Soumah |
| 4 | DF | (France) FRA | Patrick Moreau |
| 5 | DF | (France) FRA | Christophe Deguerville |
| 6 | MF | (France) FRA | Lilian Nalis |
| 7 | MF | (Poland) POL | Piotr Świerczewski |
| 8 | FW | (Denmark) DEN | Dan Petersen |
| 9 | FW | (France) FRA | Frédéric Née |
| 10 | MF | (France) FRA | Yann Lachuer |
| 11 | FW | (France) FRA | Pierre-Yves André |
| 12 | DF | (Tunisia) TUN | José Clayton |
| 14 | DF | (France) FRA | Frédéric Mendy |
| 15 | DF | (France) FRA | Franck Jurietti |

| No. | Pos. | Nation | Player |
|---|---|---|---|
| 16 | GK | (Tunisia) TUN | Ali Boumnijel |
| 17 | DF | (France) FRA | Franck Matingou |
| 18 | FW | (Liberia) LBR | Prince Daye |
| 19 | FW | (France) FRA | Pierre Laurent |
| 20 | MF | (France) FRA | Laurent Casanova |
| 21 | FW | (France) FRA | Cyril Eboki-Poh |
| 22 | MF | (France) FRA | Hervé Anziani |
| 24 | MF | (Cameroon) CMR | Paul Essola |
| 25 | MF | (France) FRA | Stéphane Odet |
| 26 | DF | (France) FRA | Zoumana Camara |
| 27 | FW | (France) FRA | Ousmane Soumah |
| 29 | MF | (France) FRA | Pascal Berenguer |
| 30 | GK | (France) FRA | Nicolas Penneteau |
| — | MF | (Nigeria) NGA | Benjamin Ajiboye |

== French Division 1 ==
=== League table ===
| Pos | Team | Pld | W | D | L | GF | GA | GD | Pts | Qualification or relegation |
|---|---|---|---|---|---|---|---|---|---|---|
| 8 | Auxerre | 34 | 13 | 8 | 13 | 37 | 39 | −2 | 47 | Qualification to Intertoto Cup second round |
| 9 | Strasbourg | 34 | 13 | 7 | 14 | 42 | 52 | −10 | 46 | |
| 10 | Bastia | 34 | 11 | 12 | 11 | 43 | 39 | +4 | 45 | |
| 11 | Metz | 34 | 9 | 17 | 8 | 38 | 33 | +5 | 44 | |
| 12 | Nantes | 34 | 12 | 7 | 15 | 39 | 40 | −1 | 43 | Qualification to UEFA Cup first round (Note: Nantes was qualified for the 2000–01 UEFA Cup as winners of the 1999–2000 Coupe de France.) |

Source: Ligue 1
Rules for classification: 1) points; 2) goal difference; 3) number of goals scored.

=== Results summary ===
| Overall | | | | | | | | Home | | | | | | Away | | | | | |
| Pld | W | D | L | GF | GA | GD | Pts | W | D | L | GF | GA | GD | W | D | L | GF | GA | GD |
|---|---|---|---|---|---|---|---|---|---|---|---|---|---|---|---|---|---|---|---|
| 34 | 11 | 12 | 11 | 43 | 39 | +4 | 45 | 11 | 5 | 1 | 32 | 8 | +24 | 0 | 7 | 10 | 11 | 31 | −20 |

Source: LFP

=== Results by round ===
| Round | 1 | 2 | 3 | 4 | 5 | 6 | 7 | 8 | 9 | 10 | 11 | 12 | 13 | 14 | 15 | 16 | 17 | 18 | 19 | 20 | 21 | 22 | 23 | 24 | 25 | 26 | 27 | 28 | 29 | 30 | 31 | 32 | 33 | 34 |
|---|---|---|---|---|---|---|---|---|---|---|---|---|---|---|---|---|---|---|---|---|---|---|---|---|---|---|---|---|---|---|---|---|---|---|
| Ground | A | H | A | H | A | H | A | H | A | H | A | A | H | A | H | A | H | A | H | A | H | A | H | A | H | A | H | H | A | H | A | H | A | H |
| Result | L | W | L | W | D | D | L | D | D | W | L | D | W | D | D | L | W | L | W | D | D | L | W | D | W | L | W | W | L | W | D | L | L | D |
| Position | 12 | 7 | 13 | 9 | 10 | 9 | 11 | 13 | 14 | 9 | 11 | 12 | 11 | 11 | 11 | 11 | 11 | 12 | 11 | 9 | 10 | 12 | 8 | 9 | 7 | 10 | 7 | 7 | 7 | 5 | 5 | 7 | 11 | 10 |

Source: lfp.fr
A = Away; H = Home; W = Win; D = Draw; L = Loss

=== Matches ===
| Date | Opponent | H / A | Result | Goal(s) | Attendance | Referee |
|---|---|---|---|---|---|---|
| 30 July 1999 | Bordeaux | A | 3-2 | Née 57', Petersen 68' | 29,563 | Claude Colombo |
| 6 August 1999 | Strasbourg | H | 3-0 | Casanova 34', Petersen 67', Née 82' | 8,600 | Bruno Coué |
| 14 August 1999 | Monaco | A | 4-0 | | 13,500 | Gilles Chéron |
| 22 August 1999 | Nantes | H | 2-1 | Laurent 60', Prince 80' | 10,000 | Alain Sars |
| 28 August 1999 | Marseille | A | 1-1 | Née 7' | 54,000 | Laurent Duhamel |
| 11 September 1999 | Nancy | H | 1-1 | André 76' | 6,000 | Philippe Kalt |
| 19 September 1999 | Sedan | A | 2-0 | | 11,000 | Éric Poulat |
| 25 September 1999 | Le Havre | H | 1-1 | Jurietti 28' | 4,500 | Stéphane Moulin |
| 2 October 1999 | St. Étienne | A | 1-1 | André 78' | 33,163 | Jean-Claude Puyalt |
| 13 October 1999 | Lens | H | 2-0 | Née 67', Prince 88' | 4,500 | Bruno Ruffray |
| 6 October 1999 | Auxerre | A | 3-1 | Soumah 78' | 8,000 | Bruno Derrien |
| 24 October 1999 | Montpellier | A | 1-1 | Prince 11' | 9,335 | Gilles Veissière |
| 30 October 1999 | Troyes | H | 5-0 | Lachuer 10', Jurietti 31', André 63', Prince 69', Mendy 82' | 5,000 | Hervé Piccirillo |
| 6 November 1999 | Rennes | A | 0-0 | | 12,457 | Éric Poulat |
| 10 November 1999 | Metz | H | 0-0 | | 5,000 | Damien Ledentu |
| 19 November 1999 | PSG | A | 2-0 | | 41,613 | Laurent Duhamel |
| 28 November 1999 | Lyon | H | 3-0 | Lachuer 20', Née 77', 85' | 8,000 | Stéphane Bré |
| 3 December 1999 | Strasbourg | A | 2-0 | | 10,185 | Claude Colombo |
| 12 December 1999 | Monaco | H | 1-0 | Camara 86' | 8,000 | Bruno Derrien |
| 18 December 1999 | Nantes | A | 1-1 | Née 90' | 25,458 | Dominique Fraise |
| 12 January 2000 | Marseille | H | 0-0 | | 8,984 | Damien Ledentu |
| 15 January 2000 | Nancy | A | 1-0 | | 7,723 | Stéphane Bré |
| 26 January 2000 | Sedan | H | 1-0 | Laurent 69' | 2,500 | Patrick Lhermite |
| 2 February 2000 | Le Havre | A | 2-2 | Jurietti 30', Laurent 67' | 9,944 | Éric Poulat |
| 5 February 2000 | St. Étienne | H | 4-0 | Lachuer 40', Née 63', 85', Swierczewski 75' | 6,000 | Pascal Garibian |
| 16 February 2000 | Lens | A | 4-0 | | 38,317 | Damien Ledentu |
| 26 February 2000 | Auxerre | H | 2-0 | André 49', 90' | 6,229 | Bertrand Layec |
| 11 March 2000 | Montpellier | H | 1-0 | Prince 90' | 5,811 | Franck Glochon |
| 25 March 2000 | Troyes | A | 1-0 | | 14,700 | Bruno Derrien |
| 8 April 2000 | Rennes | H | 4-2 | André 17', 45', Casanova (red card) 54', Nalis 72', Née 74' | 5,932 | Dominique Fraise |
| 15 April 2000 | Metz | A | 1-1 | Durand (red card) 88', Prince 90+4' | 18,095 | Philippe Kalt |
| 30 April 2000 | PSG | H | 1-2 | Valéry (red card) 43', Petersen 90' | 10,800 | Alain Sars |
| 4 May 2000 | Lyon | A | 2-1 | Née 17' | 39,812 | Pascal Garibian |
| 13 May 2000 | Bordeaux | H | 1-1 | Prince 87' | 7,128 | Gilles Veissière |

== Coupe de France ==
| Date | Tour | Opponent | H / A | Result | Goal(s) | Attendance | Referee |
|---|---|---|---|---|---|---|---|
| 22 January 2000 | End of 64 | Olympique Saint-Quentin (CFA) | A | 1–0 | | 5,000 | Philippe Kalt |

== Coupe de la Ligue ==
| Date | Tour | Opponent | H / A | Result | Goal(s) | Attendance | Referee |
|---|---|---|---|---|---|---|---|
| 9 January 2000 | End of 32 | Marseille | H | 3–0 | Lachuer 56', Jurietti 59', André 71' | 9,000 | Jean-Claude Puyault |
| 30 January 2000 | End of 16 | Montpellier | H | 1–0 | Jurietti 31' | 5,000 | Claude Colombo |
| 19 February 2000 | Quarter-final | Lyon | A | 0-1 (a.e.t.) | Née 101', M. Soumah (yellow card) 118' (yellow-red card) | 28,196 | Laurent Duhamel |
| 1 April 2000 | Semi-final | PSG | A | 4–2 | André 13', Petersen 90+2' | 38,134 | Gilles Veissiere |

== Statistics ==
=== Top scorers ===
As of 30 June 2012

| Place | Position | Nation | Name | Ligue 1 | Coupe de France | Coupe de la Ligue | Total |
|---|---|---|---|---|---|---|---|
| 1 | FW | (France) | Frédéric Née | 11 | 0 | 1 | 12 |
| 2 | FW | (France) | Pierre-Yves André | 7 | 0 | 2 | 9 |
| 3 | FW | (France) | Prince Daye | 7 | 0 | 0 | 7 |
| 4 | DF | (France) | Franck Jurietti | 3 | 0 | 2 | 5 |
| 5 | MF | (France) | Yann Lachuer | 3 | 0 | 1 | 4 |
| = | MF | (Denmark) | Dan Petersen | 3 | 0 | 1 | 4 |
| 7 | FW | (France) | Pierre Laurent | 3 | 0 | 0 | 3 |
| 8 | DF | (Poland) | Piotr Świerczewski | 1 | 0 | 0 | 1 |
| = | MF | (France) | Lilian Nalis | 1 | 0 | 0 | 1 |
| = | MF | (France) | Laurent Casanova | 1 | 0 | 0 | 1 |
| = | DF | (France) | Zoumana Camara | 1 | 0 | 0 | 1 |
| = | DF | (France) | Frédéric Mendy | 1 | 0 | 0 | 1 |
| = | FW | (France) | Ousmane Soumah | 1 | 0 | 0 | 1 |

=== League assists ===
As of 30 June 2012

| Place | Position | Nation | Name | Assists |
|---|---|---|---|---|
| 1 | MF | (France) | Yann Lachuer | 6 |
| = | DF | (France) | Franck Jurietti | 6 |
| 3 | FW | (France) | Frédéric Née | 4 |
| = | FW | (France) | Pierre-Yves André | 4 |
| = | DF | (Guinea) | Morlaye Soumah | 4 |
| 6 | DF | (Poland) | Piotr Świerczewski | 2 |
| = | FW | (Denmark) | Dan Petersen | 2 |
| 8 | MF | (France) | Lilian Nalis | 1 |
| = | DF | (France) | Laurent Casanova | 1 |
| = | DF | (Tunisia) | José Clayton | 1 |
| = | DF | (France) | Patrick Valery | 1 |
| = | DF | (France) | Patrick Moreau | 1 |
| = | DF | (France) | Frédéric Mendy | 1 |
| = | FW | (Guinea) | Ousmane Soumah | 1 |
| = | FW | (France) | Prince Daye | 1 |
