= 2000–01 SC Bastia season =

SC Bastia
2000–01 season
- Chairman: François Nicolaï
- Manager: Frédéric Antonetti
- Stadium: Stade Armand Cesari
- Division 1: 8th
- Coupe de France: End of 16
- Coupe de la Ligue: End of 16
- Top goalscorer: League: Frédéric Née (16); All: Frédéric Née (17)
- Highest home attendance: 9,927 vs Lyon (18 August 2000)
- Lowest home attendance: 5,162 vs Guingamp (28 April 2001)
- Average home league attendance: 7,358
| Home colours | Away colours |

French football club SC Bastia's 2000–01 season. Finished 8th place in league. Top scorer of the season, including 17 goals in 16 league matches have been Frédéric Née. Was eliminated to Coupe de France end of 16, the Coupe de la Ligue was able to be among the final 16 teams.

== Transfers ==
=== In ===
Summer

- Demetrius Ferreira from Nancy
- Michael Essien from Liberty Professionals
- David Faderne from Ajaccio
- Sébastien Piocelle from Nantes

Winter

- Cyril Domoraud from Inter

=== Out ===
Summer

- Franck Jurietti to AS Monaco
- Zoumana Camara to Marseille
- Dan Petersen to Bastia B

Winter

- David Mazzoncini to free

== Squad ==
As of 27 May 2012

Note: Flags indicate national team as defined under FIFA eligibility rules; some limited exceptions apply. Players may hold more than one non-FIFA nationality.

| No. | Pos. | Nation | Player |
|---|---|---|---|
| 1 | GK | FRA | Éric Durand |
| 2 | DF | FRA | Patrick Valéry |
| 3 | DF | GUI | Morlaye Soumah (captain) |
| 4 | DF | BRA | Demetrius Ferreira |
| 5 | DF | FRA | Christophe Deguerville |
| 6 | MF | FRA | Lilian Nalis |
| 7 | MF | POL | Piotr Świerczewski |
| 8 | FW | DEN | Dan Petersen |
| 9 | FW | FRA | Frédéric Née |
| 10 | MF | FRA | Yann Lachuer |
| 11 | FW | FRA | Pierre-Yves André |
| 12 | DF | FRA | Patrick Moreau |
| 14 | DF | FRA | Frédéric Mendy |

| No. | Pos. | Nation | Player |
|---|---|---|---|
| 15 | FW | FRA | Pierre Laurent |
| 16 | GK | TUN | Ali Boumnijel |
| 17 | DF | CIV | Cyril Domoraud (on loan from Inter Milan) |
| 18 | FW | LBR | Prince Daye |
| 19 | MF | FRA | Stéphane Odet |
| 20 | DF | FRA | Laurent Casanova |
| 22 | MF | TUN | José Clayton |
| 23 | MF | COD | Franck Matingou |
| 25 | MF | GHA | Michael Essien |
| 26 | MF | FRA | Sébastien Piocelle (on loan from Nantes) |
| 27 | FW | GUI | Ousmane Soumah |
| 28 | FW | FRA | David Faderne |
| 30 | GK | FRA | Nicolas Penneteau |

== French Division 1 ==
=== League table ===
| Pos | Team | Pld | W | D | L | GF | GA | GD | Pts | Qualification or relegation |
|---|---|---|---|---|---|---|---|---|---|---|
| 6 | Rennes | 34 | 15 | 5 | 14 | 46 | 37 | +9 | 50 | Qualification to Intertoto Cup third round |
| 7 | Troyes | 34 | 11 | 13 | 10 | 45 | 47 | −2 | 46 | Qualification to Intertoto Cup second round |
| 8 | Bastia | 34 | 13 | 6 | 15 | 45 | 41 | +4 | 45 | Qualification to Intertoto Cup second round |
| 9 | Paris Saint-Germain | 34 | 12 | 8 | 14 | 44 | 45 | −1 | 44 | Qualification to Intertoto Cup second round |
| 10 | Guingamp | 34 | 11 | 11 | 12 | 40 | 48 | −8 | 44 | |

Source: Ligue 1
Rules for classification: 1) points; 2) goal difference; 3) number of goals scored.

=== Results summary ===
| Overall | | | | | | | | Home | | | | | | Away | | | | | |
| Pld | W | D | L | GF | GA | GD | Pts | W | D | L | GF | GA | GD | W | D | L | GF | GA | GD |
|---|---|---|---|---|---|---|---|---|---|---|---|---|---|---|---|---|---|---|---|
| 34 | 13 | 6 | 15 | 45 | 41 | +4 | 45 | 10 | 3 | 4 | 29 | 15 | +14 | 3 | 3 | 11 | 16 | 26 | −10 |

Source: LFP

=== Results by round ===
| Round | 1 | 2 | 3 | 4 | 5 | 6 | 7 | 8 | 9 | 10 | 11 | 12 | 13 | 14 | 15 | 16 | 17 | 18 | 19 | 20 | 21 | 22 | 23 | 24 | 25 | 26 | 27 | 28 | 29 | 30 | 31 | 32 | 33 | 34 |
|---|---|---|---|---|---|---|---|---|---|---|---|---|---|---|---|---|---|---|---|---|---|---|---|---|---|---|---|---|---|---|---|---|---|---|
| Ground | A | H | A | H | A | H | A | H | A | H | H | A | H | A | H | A | H | A | H | A | H | A | H | A | H | A | A | H | A | H | A | H | A | H |
| Result | W | W | L | W | L | W | W | L | D | W | L | D | D | L | W | L | W | D | W | L | D | L | W | W | L | L | L | D | L | L | L | W | L | W |
| Position | 4 | 2 | 5 | 2 | 5 | 2 | 1 | 1 | 2 | 1 | 2 | 2 | 4 | 8 | 4 | 7 | 6 | 5 | 4 | 6 | 5 | 8 | 7 | 5 | 6 | 7 | 8 | 10 | 10 | 11 | 11 | 9 | 10 | 8 |

Source: LFP
A = Away; H = Home; W = Win; D = Draw; L = Loss

=== Matches ===
| Date | Opponent | H / A | Result | Goal(s) | Attendance | Referee |
|---|---|---|---|---|---|---|
| 29 July 2000 | Toulouse | A | 0 - 1 | Née 71' | 19,956 | Éric Poulat |
| 5 August 2000 | Bordeaux | H | 2 - 0 | Née 44', 89' | 9,285 | Claude Colombo |
| 12 August 2000 | Auxerre | A | 1 - 0 | | 8,127 | Gilles Veissière |
| 18 August 2000 | Lyon | H | 2 - 0 | Lachuer 53', André 61' | 9,927 | Alain Sars |
| 27 August 2000 | Paris SG | A | 3 - 1 | Prince 74' | 40,985 | Stéphane Bré |
| 6 September 2000 | Lille | H | 1 - 0 | Née 51' | 6,677 | Bertrand Layec |
| 9 September 2000 | Strasbourg | A | 1 - 4 | André 35', 70', Née 56', 90' | 11,629 | Éric Poulat |
| 16 September 2000 | Rennes | H | 0 - 2 | M. Soumah (red card) 89' | 8,000 | Damien Ledentu |
| 23 September 2000 | Sedan | A | 3 - 3 | Née 7', Laurent 77', Lachuer 90' | 11,524 | Philippe Kalt |
| 30 September 2000 | Metz | H | 1 - 0 | Casanova 43' | 6,252 | Bruno Coué |
| 13 October 2000 | AS Monaco | H | 0 - 2 | | 8,100 | Pascal Garibian |
| 21 October 2000 | Troyes | A | 0 - 0 | | 13,995 | Bertrand Layec |
| 29 October 2000 | St. Etienne | H | 0 - 0 | | 7,637 | Philippe Kalt |
| 4 November 2000 | Lens | A | 4 - 0 | | 40,107 | Patrick Lhermite |
| 13 December 2000 | Nantes | H | 3 - 1 | Domoraud 38', Świerczewski 43', Fabbri 61' (o.g.) | 6,712 | Hervé Piccirillo |
| 18 November 2000 | Guingamp | A | 1 - 0 | | 9,003 | Damien Ledentu |
| 25 November 2000 | Marseille | H | 3 - 0 | Trévisan 43' (o.g.), Née 55', André 78' | 9,217 | Bertrand Layec |
| 29 November 2000 | Bordeaux | A | 0 - 0 | | 24,798 | Stéphane Moulin |
| 2 December 2000 | Auxerre | H | 3 - 1 | Nalis 43', André 65' (pen.), Née 84' | 6,133 | Bruno Derrien |
| 9 December 2000 | Lyon | A | 1 - 0 | | 35,853 | Pascal Garibian |
| 17 December 2000 | Paris SG | H | 1 - 1 | Née 57' | 9,212 | Gilles Veissière |
| 21 December 2000 | Lille | A | 1 - 0 | | 15,619 | Franck Glochon |
| 13 January 2001 | Strasbourg | H | 3 - 1 | André (red card) 15', Née 39', H. Beye 62' (o.g.), Laurent 90' | 5,725 | Pascal Viléo |
| 27 January 2001 | Rennes | A | 1 - 2 | Lachuer 64', Née 85' | 15,941 | Éric Poulat |
| 3 February 2001 | Sedan | H | 0 - 1 | | 9,894 | Franck Glochon |
| 7 February 2001 | Metz | A | 3 - 2 | André 28', Essien 88' | 15,258 | Bruno Derrien |
| 17 February 2001 | AS Monaco | A | 2 - 1 | André 71' | 7,210 | Philippe Kalt |
| 3 March 2001 | Troyes | H | 2 - 2 | Lachuer 3', André 9' (pen.) | 6,079 | Bruno Ruffray |
| 17 March 2001 | St. Etienne | A | 2 - 1 | Née 82' | 25,435 | Philippe Kalt |
| 7 April 2001 | Lens | H | 1 - 3 | Queudrue 58' (o.g.) | 5,654 | Dominique Fraise |
| 14 April 2001 | Nantes | A | 1 - 0 | | 35,096 | Alain Sars |
| 28 April 2001 | Guingamp | H | 2 - 0 | Świerczewski 21', Née 90' | 5,162 | Laurent Duhamel |
| 12 May 2001 | Marseille | A | 2 - 1 | Née 51' | 55,442 | Bruno Derrien |
| 19 May 2001 | Toulouse | H | 5 - 1 | Ferreira 38', Świerczewski 45', André 68', 75', Née 82' | 5,415 | Pascal Garibian |

== Coupe de France ==
| Date | Round | Opponent | H / A | Result | Goal(s) | Attendance | Referee |
|---|---|---|---|---|---|---|---|
| 20 January 2001 | End of 64 | Annonay | A | [ 0 - 3] | Prince 46', Lachuer 50', F. Mendy 71' | 3,800 | Damien Ledentu |
| 10 February 2001 | End of 32 | Metz | H | [ 4 - 1] | Laurent 35', Nalis 48', André 54', Faderne 87' | 4,116 | Bruno Coué |
| 10 March 2001 | End of 16 | Reims | A | [ 1 - 0] | | 7,000 | Bruno Derrien |

== Coupe de la Ligue ==
| Date | Round | Opponent | H / A | Result | Goal(s) | Attendance | Referee |
|---|---|---|---|---|---|---|---|
| 7 January 2001 | End of 32 | Nice | H | 2 - 1 | André 40', Née 80' | 3,754 | Philippe Kalt |
| 31 January 2001 | End of 16 | AS Monaco | A | 2 - 1 | André 50' (pen.) | 9,941 | Pascal Garibian |

== Statistics ==
=== Top scorers ===
As of 27 May 2012

| Place | Position | Nation | Name | Ligue 1 | Coupe de France | Coupe de la Ligue | Total |
|---|---|---|---|---|---|---|---|
| 1 | FW | (France) | Frédéric Née | 16 | 0 | 1 | 17 |
| 2 | FW | (France) | Pierre-Yves André | 10 | 1 | 2 | 13 |
| 3 | MF | (France) | Yann Lachuer | 4 | 1 | 0 | 5 |
| 4 | DF | (Poland) | Piotr Świerczewski | 3 | 0 | 0 | 3 |
| 5 | FW | (France) | Pierre Laurent | 2 | 1 | 0 | 3 |
| 6 | FW | (France) | Prince Daye | 1 | 1 | 0 | 2 |
| = | MF | (France) | Lilian Nalis | 1 | 1 | 0 | 2 |
| 8 | DF | (Brazil) | Demetrius Ferreira | 1 | 0 | 0 | 1 |
| = | MF | (Ghana) | Michael Essien | 1 | 0 | 0 | 1 |
| = | MF | (France) | Laurent Casanova | 1 | 0 | 0 | 1 |
| = | DF | (France) | Cyril Domoraud | 1 | 0 | 0 | 1 |
| = | DF | (France) | Frédéric Mendy | 0 | 1 | 0 | 1 |
| = | FW | (France) | David Faderne | 0 | 1 | 0 | 1 |

=== League assists ===
As of 27 May 2012

| Place | Position | Nation | Name | Assists |
|---|---|---|---|---|
| 1 | MF | (France) | Yann Lachuer | 12 |
| 2 | FW | (France) | Frédéric Née | 7 |
| = | FW | (France) | Pierre-Yves André | 7 |
| 4 | DF | (Brazil) | Demetrius Ferreira | 3 |
| = | DF | (France) | Patrick Valery | 3 |
| = | DF | (Poland) | Piotr Świerczewski | 3 |
| = | MF | (France) | Lilian Nalis | 3 |
| = | FW | (France) | Pierre Laurent | 3 |
| 9 | DF | (Guinea) | Morlaye Soumah | 2 |
| = | DF | (Tunisia) | José Clayton | 2 |
| 11 | FW | (France) | Prince Daye | 1 |
