= 1998–99 SC Bastia season =

SC Bastia
1998–99 season
- Chairman: François Nicolaï
- Manager: Henryk Kasperczak; Laurent Fournier; José Pasqualetti
- Stadium: Stade Armand Cesari
- Division 1: 13th
- Coupe de France: End of 64
- Coupe de la Ligue: End of 32
- Intertoto Cup: Semi finals
- Top goalscorer: League: Frédéric Née (11); All: Frédéric Née (14)
- Highest home attendance: 8,459 vs Marseille (24 September 1998)
- Lowest home attendance: 3,726 vs Auxerre (19 December 1998)
- Average home league attendance: 5,229
Home colours	Away colours

French football club SC Bastia's 1998–99 season. Finished 13th place in league. Top scorer of the season, including 14 goals in 12 league matches have been Frédéric Née. Was eliminated to Coupe de France end of 64, the Coupe de la Ligue was able to be among the final 32 teams and the Intertoto Cup was able to be among the semi-finals.

== Players ==
=== In ===
Summer

- Franck Matingou and Stéphane Odet from Martigues
- José Clayton from Etoile du Sahel
- David Mazzoncini from Cannes
- Frédéric Née from Caen
- Nebojša Krupniković from Gamba Osaka
- Andrés Grande from Argentinos Juniors
- Mariusz Piekarski from Mogi Mirim
- Patrick Valery from Blackburn Rovers
- Paulo Alves from Sporting Lizbon

Winter

- Sébastien Perez from Blackburn Rovers

=== Out ===
Summer

- Ardian Kozniku and Hervé Sekli to Dinamo Zagreb
- Mamadou Faye to Gazélec Ajaccio
- Cyril Rool to Lens
- Wilfrid Gohel to Cannes
- Fabien Piveteau to retired
- Pascal Garrido to Triestina
- Lubomir Moravcik to Duisburg
- Nenad Jestrovic to Metz
- Sébastien Perez to Blackburn Rovers
- Ousmane Soumah to Lorient

Winter

- Piotr Swierczewski to Gamba Osaka
- Laurent Fournier to retired

== Squad ==
As of 15 July 2012

Note: Flags indicate national team as defined under FIFA eligibility rules; some limited exceptions apply. Players may hold more than one non-FIFA nationality.

No.	Pos.	Nation	Player
1	GK	(France) FRA	Eric Durand
16	GK	(Tunisia) TUN	Ali Boumnijel
30	GK	(France) FRA	Nicolas Penneteau
2	DF	(France) FRA	Patrick Valery
3	DF	(Guinea) GUI	Morlaye Soumah
4	DF	(France) FRA	Patrick Moreau
5	DF	(France) FRA	Christophe Deguerville
8	DF	(Tunisia) TUN	José Clayton
14	DF	(France) FRA	Frédéric Mendy
15	DF	(France) FRA	Franck Jurietti
17	DF	(Democratic Republic of the Congo) COD	Franck Matingou
21	DF	(France) FRA	François Modesto
26	DF	(France) FRA	Jacques Cristofari
27	DF	(France) FRA	David Ducourtioux
28	MF	(France) FRA	Laurent Fournier
7	MF	(Poland) POL	Piotr Świerczewski

No.	Pos.	Nation	Player
23	MF	(Argentina) ARG	Andrés Grande
20	MF	(France) FRA	Laurent Casanova
13	MF	(France) FRA	Hervé Anziani
22	MF	(Federal Republic of Yugoslavia) YUG	Nebojša Krupniković
25	MF	(France) FRA	Stéphane Odet
10	MF	(Poland) POL	Mariusz Piekarski
6	MF	(France) FRA	David Mazzoncini
24	MF	(France) FRA	Sébastien Perez
29	FW	(Portugal) POR	Paulo Alves
9	FW	(France) FRA	Frédéric Née
11	FW	(France) FRA	Pierre-Yves André
18	FW	(Liberia) LBR	Prince Daye
19	FW	(France) FRA	Pierre Laurent
—	FW	(Federal Republic of Yugoslavia) YUG	Nenad Jestrović
22	FW	(France) FRA	Ousmane Soumah
31	FW	(France) FRA	Nassim Mendil

== French Division 1 ==
=== League table ===
Pos	Team	Pld	W	D	L	GF	GA	GD	Pts
11	Nancy	34	10	9	15	35	45	−10	39
12	Strasbourg	34	8	14	12	30	36	−6	38
13	Bastia	34	10	8	16	37	46	−9	38
14	Auxerre	34	9	10	15	40	45	−5	37
15	Le Havre	34	8	11	15	23	38	−15	35

Source: Ligue 1
Rules for classification: 1) points; 2) goal difference; 3) number of goals scored.

=== Results summary ===
Overall								Home						Away					
Pld	W	D	L	GF	GA	GD	Pts	W	D	L	GF	GA	GD	W	D	L	GF	GA	GD
34	10	8	16	37	46	−9	38	9	5	3	27	13	+14	1	3	13	10	33	−23

Source: LFP

=== Results by round ===
Round	1	2	3	4	5	6	7	8	9	10	11	12	13	14	15	16	17	18	19	20	21	22	23	24	25	26	27	28	29	30	31	32	33	34
Ground	H	A	H	A	H	A	H	H	A	H	A	H	A	H	A	H	A	H	A	H	A	H	A	A	H	A	H	A	H	A	H	A	H	A
Result	D	L	W	L	W	L	L	W	L	D	W	W	L	W	L	W	L	W	L	W	D	L	L	L	D	D	L	L	D	D	D	L	W	L
Position	6	17	9	11	9	11	14	10	11	10	11	9	9	7	9	7	10	7	8	7	8	9	9	10	10	9	10	11	11	11	11	13	11	13

Source: LFP
A = Away; H = Home; W = Win; D = Draw; L = Loss

=== Matches ===
Date	Opponent	H / A	Result	Goal(s)	Attendance	Referee
8 August 1998	Montpellier	H	2 - 2	André 8', 90' (pen.)	5,744	Patrick Anton
15 August 1998	Paris SG	A	2 - 0	-	38,427	Rémy Harrel
22 August 1998	Metz	H	3 - 0	André 31', Née 53', Paulo Alves 87'	6,440	Bruno Derrien
30 August 1998	Auxerre	A	1 - 0	Jurietti (red card) 74'	9,662	Stéphane Bré
11 September 1998	Le Havre	H	2 - 0	Laurent 10', 74', André (yellow card) 56' (yellow-red card)	4,434	Jean-Claude Puyalt
19 September 1998	Rennes	A	2 - 0	-	13,256	Patrick Lhermite
24 September 1998	Marseille	H	0 - 2	-	8,459	Pascal Garibian
3 October 1998	Bordeaux	H	2 - 0	Paulo Alves 10', André 61'	4,002	Philippe Kalt
18 October 1998	Toulouse	A	2 - 1	Jurietti 46', Fournier (yellow card) 85' (yellow-red card)	11,828	Bruno Coué
24 October 1998	Strasbourg	H	0 - 0	-	4,027	Éric Poulat
30 October 1998	Nancy	A	1 - 2	Née 24', André 39'	7,725	Damien Ledentu
6 November 1998	Lorient	H	2 - 1	André 30', Née 49'	5,008	Serge Léon
11 November 1998	Sochaux	A	2 - 1	Née 7'	7,591	Claude Colombo
14 November 1998	AS Monaco	H	3 - 1	Świerczewski 17', André 66', Valery (yellow card) 79' (yellow-red card) , Née 83'	4,146	Franck Glochon
20 November 1998	Lens	A	1 - 0	Clayton (yellow card) 71' (yellow-red card) , Mazzoncini (red card) 88'	28,457	Gilles Chéron
28 November 1998	Lyon	H	4 - 1	Jurietti 18', Née 23', André 68' (pen.), 73', Modesto (red card) 74'	4,232	Bruno Derrien
4 December 1998	Nantes	A	2 - 0	Moreau (yellow card) 44' (yellow-red card)	17,605	Jean-Claude Puyalt
12 December 1998	Paris SG	H	2 - 0	Née 3', 45'	5,143	Marc Batta
15 December 1998	Metz	A	4 - 0	-	14,700	Laurent Duhamel
19 December 1998	Auxerre	H	2 - 0	Paulo Alves 50', Laurent 87'	3,726	Alain Sars
16 January 1999	Le Havre	A	1 - 1	Née 17', Świerczewski (red card) 60'	10,077	Stéphane Bré
29 January 1999	Rennes	H	0 - 1	Valery (yellow card) 13' (yellow-red card) , Durand (yellow card) 16' (red card)	5,298	Gilles Veissière
6 February 1999	Marseille	A	3 - 1	Laurent 76'	48,269	Jean-Claude Puyalt
13 February 1999	Bordeaux	A	2 - 0	-	25,744	Patrick Anton
26 February 1999	Toulouse	H	1 - 1	Prince 59'	4,279	Bertrand Layec
10 March 1999	Strasbourg	A	1 - 1	Clayton 79'	12,415	Patrick Lhermite
19 March 1999	Nancy	H	1 - 2	Krupniković 57', Durand (yellow card) 86' (yellow-red card)	5,142	Laurent Duhamel
3 April 1999	Lorient	A	3 - 1	Perez 40'	11,910	Gilles Chéron
13 April 1999	Sochaux	H	1 - 1	Perez 40'	6,028	Franck Glochon
24 April 1999	AS Monaco	A	1 - 1	Née 8'	6,198	Philippe Kalt
1 May 1999	Lens	H	1 - 1	André (red card) 38', Laurent 56'	6,694	Damien Ledentu
5 May 1999	Lyon	A	2 - 1	Laurent 3'	25,474	Bruno Coué
22 May 1999	Nantes	H	1 - 0	Née 55'	6,090	Rémy Harrel
29 May 1999	Montpellier	A	3 - 0	-	13,446	Patrick Anton

== Coupe de France ==
Date	Tour	Opponent	H / A	Result	Goal(s)	Attendance	Referee
23 January 1999	End of 64	Dijon	A	[ 2 - 1]	André 69'	6,600	Bruno Coué

== Coupe de la Ligue ==
Date	Tour	Opponent	H / A	Result	Goal(s)	Attendance	Referee
9 January 1999	End of 32	Sochaux	A	1 - 0 (a.e.t.)	-	6,000	Rémy Harrel

== UEFA Intertoto Cup ==
Date	Opponent	H / A	Result	Goal(s)	Attendance	Referee
2. round
4 July 1998	(North Macedonia) Skopje	A	[ 1 - 0]	-	2,000	(Turkey) İlhami Kaplan
11 July 1998	(North Macedonia) Skopje	H	[ 7 - 0]	André 9', Née 15', Laurent 50', 81' (pen.), Prince 63', 76', Matingou 85'	2,500	(Portugal) Joaquim Paulo Paraty
3. round
18 July 1998	(Turkey) Altay	H	[ 2 - 0]	Née 40', Prince 62'	2,500	(Spain) Victor José Esquinas
25 July 1998	(Turkey) Altay	A	[ 3 - 2] (a.e.t.)	Valery (red card) 30', Świerczewski (red card) 80', Jurietti 92' (pen.), 103' (pen.)	5,000	(Scotland) Alan Freeland
Semi final
29 July 1998	(Federal Republic of Yugoslavia) Vojvodina	H	[ 2 - 0]	Née 16', Laurent 42' (pen.)	2,500	(Portugal) Jorge Coroado
5 August 1998	(Federal Republic of Yugoslavia) Vojvodina	A	[ 4 - 0]	Jurietti (yellow card) 54' (yellow-red card)	10,000	(Slovakia) Ľuboš Micheľ

== Statistics ==
=== Top scorers ===
As of 15 July 2012

Place	Position	Nation	Name	Ligue 1	Coupe de France	Coupe de la Ligue	Intertoto Cup	Total
1	FW	(France)	Frédéric Née	11	0	0	3	14
2	FW	(France)	Pierre-Yves André	9	1	0	1	11
3	FW	(France)	Pierre Laurent	6	0	0	3	9
4	DF	(France)	Franck Jurietti	2	0	0	2	4
=	FW	(France)	Prince Daye	1	0	0	3	4
6	MF	(Portugal)	Paulo Alves	3	0	0	0	3
7	MF	(France)	Sébastien Perez	2	0	0	0	2
8	MF	(Federal Republic of Yugoslavia)	Nebojša Krupniković	1	0	0	0	1
=	MF	(Tunisia)	José Clayton	1	0	0	0	1
=	MF	(Poland)	Piotr Świerczewski	1	0	0	0	1
=	MF	(Democratic Republic of the Congo)	Franck Matingou	0	0	0	1	1

=== League assists ===
As of 15 July 2012

Place	Position	Nation	Name	Assists
1	MF	(Tunisia)	José Clayton	6
2	FW	(France)	Frédéric Née	4
3	FW	(France)	Pierre-Yves André	3
=	FW	(France)	Pierre Laurent	3
5	DF	(France)	Franck Jurietti	2
=	DF	(France)	Christophe Deguerville	2
7	DF	(Guinea)	Morlaye Soumah	1
=	MF	(Poland)	Piotr Świerczewski	1
=	FW	(Guinea)	Ousmane Soumah	1
=	MF	(Portugal)	Paulo Alves	1
=	MF	(Poland)	Mariusz Piekarski	1
=	DF	(Democratic Republic of the Congo)	Franck Matingou	1
=	MF	(France)	Sébastien Perez	1
=	DF	(France)	Frédéric Mendy	1
=	DF	(France)	François Modesto	1
