= 1996–97 SC Bastia season =

SC Bastia
1996–97 season
- Chairman: François Nicolaï
- Manager: Frédéric Antonetti
- Stadium: Stade Armand Cesari
- Division 1: 7th
- Coupe de France: End of 32
- Coupe de la Ligue: End of 32
- Top goalscorer: League: Anto Drobnjak (18); All: Anto Drobnjak (19)
- Highest home attendance: 10,800 vs Paris SG (15 April 1997)
- Lowest home attendance: 3,500 vs Nice (7 December 1996)
- Average home league attendance: 5,415
Home colours	Away colours

During the 1996–97 season, SC Bastia finished in 7th place in Ligue 1, the top tier of French football. Their top scorer of the season, including 19 goals in 18 league matches, was Anto Drobnjak. They were eliminated from the Coupe de France in the round of 32 and the Coupe de la Ligue in the first round.

== Transfers ==
=== In ===
Summer

- Patrick Moreau, Lubomir Moravcik and Sébastien Perez from St. Etienne
- Wilfried Gohel from Strasbourg
- Ermin Siljak from Olimpija
- Laurent Weber from Valenciennes
- Pascal Camadini from Perpignan
- Jamie Fullarton from St Mirren
- Fabien Piveteau from AS Monaco
- Patrick Valery from Toulouse

Winter

- No.

=== Out ===
Summer

- Bruno Rodriguez to Strasbourg
- Bruno Valencony to Nice
- Andre Biancarelli to Metz
- Jean-Christophe Debu to free
- Remy Loret to Toulouse
- Dume Franchi to unknown
- William to Compostela
- Bruno Alicarte to Alaves
- Frédéric Darras to Swindon Town

Winter

- Pierre Laurent to Leeds United

== Squad ==
As of 4 August 2012

Note: Flags indicate national team as defined under FIFA eligibility rules; some limited exceptions apply. Players may hold more than one non-FIFA nationality.

No.	Pos.	Nation	Player
1	GK	FRA	Fabien Piveteau
16	GK	FRA	Laurent Weber
4	DF	FRA	Pierre Maroselli
3	DF	GUI	Morlaye Soumah
12	DF	FRA	Patrick Moreau
21	DF	FRA	Frédéric Darras
17	DF	FRA	Patrick Valery
5	DF	FRA	Didier Santini
18	DF	SCO	Jamie Fullarton
6	DF	FRA	Cyril Rool
2	MF	FRA	Sébastien Perez
14	MF	SEN	Mamadou Faye

No.	Pos.	Nation	Player
7	MF	POL	Piotr Świerczewski
8	MF	FRA	Pascal Camadini
20	MF	FRA	Laurent Moracchini
24	MF	FRA	Hervé Anziani
13	MF	FRA	Jean-Jacques Eydelie
10	MF	SVK	Lubomir Moravcik
23	FW	SVN	Ermin Siljak
11	FW	FRA	Franck Vandecasteele
15	FW	FRA	Pierre Laurent
9	FW	YUG	Anto Drobnjak
22	FW	GUI	Ousmane Soumah
19	FW	FRA	Wilfried Gohel

== French Division 1 ==
=== League table ===
Pos	Team	Pld	W	D	L	GF	GA	GD	Pts	Qualification or relegation
5	Metz	38	17	11	10	40	30	+10	62	Qualification to UEFA Cup first round
6	Auxerre	38	17	10	11	49	32	+17	61	Qualification to Intertoto Cup group stage
7	Bastia	38	17	10	11	54	47	+7	61	Qualification to Intertoto Cup group stage
8	Lyon	38	16	12	10	59	50	+9	60	Qualification to Intertoto Cup group stage
9	Strasbourg	38	19	3	16	52	49	+3	60	Qualification to UEFA Cup first round (Note: Strasbourg was qualified for the 1997–98 UEFA Cup as winners of the 1996–97 Coupe de la Ligue.)

Source: Ligue 1
Rules for classification: 1) points; 2) goal difference; 3) number of goals scored.

=== Results summary ===
Overall								Home						Away					
Pld	W	D	L	GF	GA	GD	Pts	W	D	L	GF	GA	GD	W	D	L	GF	GA	GD
38	17	10	11	54	47	+7	61	12	5	2	30	13	+17	5	5	9	24	34	−10

Source: LFP

=== Results by round ===
Round	1	2	3	4	5	6	7	8	9	10	11	12	13	14	15	16	17	18	19	20	21	22	23	24	25	26	27	28	29	30	31	32	33	34	35	36	37	38
Ground	H	H	A	H	A	H	A	H	A	H	A	H	A	H	A	H	A	H	A	A	H	A	H	A	H	A	H	A	H	A	H	A	H	A	H	A	H	A
Result	W	W	D	D	L	W	W	W	D	D	L	D	D	L	L	W	W	W	W	L	W	W	W	L	W	D	W	L	D	L	W	D	D	L	L	L	W	W
Position	3	4	2	3	11	7	3	2	2	2	3	4	4	6	9	8	6	4	3	5	3	3	3	3	3	3	3	3	5	5	3	3	4	6	8	9	8	7

Source: LFP
A = Away; H = Home; W = Win; D = Draw; L = Loss

=== Matches ===
Date	Opponent	H / A	Result	Goal(s)	Attendance	Referee
10 August 1996	Rennes	H	2 - 0	Drobnjak 17', 79'	6,000	Jean-Claude Puyalt
16 August 1996	Guingamp	H	1 - 0	Moravcik 39'	8,000	Serge Léon
24 August 1996	Nice	A	1 - 1	Drobnjak 81'	6,500	Stéphane Bré
26 August 1996	Lille	H	0 - 0	-	5,000	Rémy Harrel
3 September 1996	Bordeaux	A	3 - 1	Laurent 64'	22,000	Bruno Coué
6 September 1996	Marseille	H	2 - 0	Moravcik 18', Drobnjak 42'	7,000	Claude Tellène
14 September 1996	Strasbourg	A	1 - 3	Moravcik 26', Drobnjak 73', 86'	9,159	Gilles Veissière
20 September 1996	Caen	H	4 - 2	Swierczewski 35', 70', Perez 55', Drobnjak 83'	5,000	Éric Poulat
28 September 1996	Nancy	A	2 - 2	Drobnjak 17' (pen.), Fullarton (red card) 65' Moravcik 76'	7,108	Marc Batta
2 October 1996	Nantes	H	0 - 0	-	5,000	Gilles Chéron
5 October 1996	Montpellier	A	3 - 1	Eydelie 55'	9,122	Claude Colombo
11 October 1996	AS Monaco	H	0 - 0	-	7,000	Patrick Anton
19 October 1996	Cannes	A	1 - 1	Camadini 89'	5,000	Éric Poulat
25 October 1996	Lens	H	0 - 1	Perez (yellow card) 79' (yellow-red card)	5,000	Philippe Kalt
3 November 1996	Paris SG	A	3 - 0	-	34,856	Gilles Chéron
6 November 1996	Lyon	H	3 - 1	Gohel 17', 79', Vandecasteele 36'	4,000	Alain Sars
13 November 1996	Le Havre	A	0 - 1	Perez 51'	7,643	Claude Tellène
16 November 1996	Metz	H	2 - 1	Perez 80', Laurent 89'	5,000	Pascal Garibian
22 November 1996	Auxerre	A	1 - 2	Drobnjak 27' (pen.), 75'	8,000	Claude Colombo
29 November 1996	Guingamp	A	2 - 1	Swierczewski 90'	7,288	Jean-Marc Gonon
7 December 1996	Nice	H	1 - 0	Drobnjak 17'	3,500	Jean-Claude Puyalt
14 December 1996	Lille	A	1 - 2	Vandecasteele 46', Laurent 64'	8,066	Philippe Leduc
19 December 1996	Bordeaux	H	3 - 1	Drobnjak 18', Perez 26', Moreau 44'	5,000	Laurent Duhamel
25 January 1997	Marseille	A	1 - 0	Valery (yellow card) 74' (yellow-red card)	19,000	Éric Poulat
2 February 1997	Strasbourg	H	3 - 1	Siljak 34', Gohel 43', Drobnjak 51'	5,500	Stéphane Bré
11 February 1997	Caen	A	2 - 2	Drobnjak 33', Perez 44', Eydelie (yellow card) 75' (yellow-red card)	16,465	Gilles Veissière
22 February 1997	Nancy	H	2 - 0	Gohel 60', Drobnjak 89'	4,000	Claude Tellène
8 March 1997	Nantes	A	3 - 0	Moravcik (red card) 28'	27,000	Claude Colombo
14 March 1997	Montpellier	H	2 - 2	Moreau 76', Perez 88'	5,000	Jean-Marc Gonon
22 March 1997	AS Monaco	A	3 - 1	Swierczewski 40'	5,500	Stéphane Bré
26 March 1997	Cannes	H	1 - 0	Drobnjak 87'	5,000	Bruno Derrien
6 April 1997	Lens	A	1 - 1	Siljak 44'	20,000	Laurent Duhamel
15 April 1997	Paris SG	H	1 - 1	Moravcik 26'	10,080	Marc Batta
26 April 1997	Lyon	A	4 - 2	Camadini 29', Swierczewski (red card) 31', Drobnjak 40'	20,000	Bernard Saules
30 April 1997	Le Havre	H	1 - 2	Perez 89'	6,000	Philippe Kalt
3 May 1997	Metz	A	1 - 0	-	20,927	Jean-Claude Puyalt
17 May 1997	Auxerre	H	2 - 1	Siljak 53', Moreau 87'	5,500	Stéphane Bré
24 May 1997	Rennes	A	1 - 3	Moravcik 13', Vandecasteele 45', Drobnjak 65'	11,446	Roger Philippi

== Coupe de France ==
Date	Round	Opponent	H / A	Result	Goal(s)	Attendance	Referee
17 January 1997	End of 64	La Roche	A	[ 2 - 4]	Vandecasteele 18', 46', Drobnjak 32', Laurent 80'	3,839	Jean-Marc Gonon
7 February 1997	End of 32	Nice	H	[ 2 - 2] (pen. 3-4)	Camadini 20', Siljak 86'	6,000	Alain Sars

== Coupe de la Ligue ==
Date	Round	Opponent	H / A	Result	Goal(s)	Attendance	Referee
11 December 1996	End of 32	Montpellier	A	2 - 2 (pen. 4 - 2)	Siljak 63', 85'	3,818	Gilles Veissière

== Top scorers ==
As of 4 August 2012

Place	Position	Nation	Name	Ligue 1	Coupe de France	Coupe de la Ligue	Total
1	FW	(Federal Republic of Yugoslavia)	Anto Drobnjak	18	1	0	19
2	MF	(France)	Sébastien Perez	7	0	0	7
3	FW	(Slovakia)	Lubomir Moravcik	6	0	0	6
=	FW	(Slovenia)	Ermin Siljak	3	1	2	6
5	FW	(France)	Franck Vandecasteele	3	2	0	5
6	FW	(France)	Wilfried Gohel	4	0	0	4
=	MF	(Poland)	Piotr Swierczewski	4	0	0	4
=	FW	(France)	Pierre Laurent	3	1	0	4
9	DF	(France)	Patrick Moreau	3	0	0	3
=	MF	(France)	Pascal Camadini	2	1	0	3
11	MF	(France)	Jean-Jacques Eydelie	1	0	0	1
