= List of SC Bastia seasons =

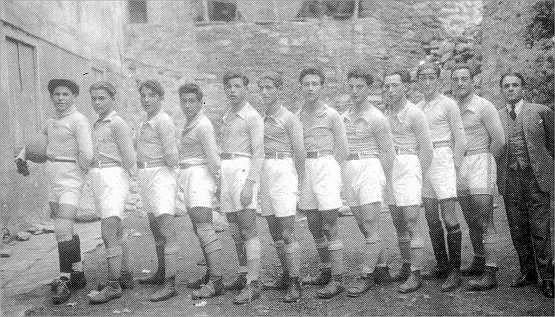
The SC Bastia team at the start of the 1905–06 season.

Sporting Club de Bastia is a French professional football club based in Stade Armand Cesari, Bastia.

The club has won total of five major trophies, including the Ligue 2 twice, the Championnat National once, the Coupe de France once, the Trophée des Champions once and the UEFA Intertoto Cup once.

This list details the club's achievements in major competitions, and the top scorers for each season. Top scorers in bold were also the top scorers in the French league that season.

== Keys ==
- P = Played
- W = Games won
- D = Games drawn
- L = Games lost
- F = Goals for
- A = Goals against
- Pts = Points
- Pos = Final position
- Div 1/Ligue 1 = Ligue 1
- Div 2/Ligue 2 = Ligue 2
- Chmp. Nat. = Championnat National
- F = Final
- Group = Group stage
- QF = Quarter-finals
- QR1 = First Qualifying Round
- QR2 = Second Qualifying Round
- QR3 = Third Qualifying Round
- QR4 = Fourth Qualifying Round
- PO = Play-off
- R1 = Round 1
- R2 = Round 2
- R3 = Round 3
- R4 = Round 4
- R5 = Round 5
- R6 = Round 6
- R7 = Round 7
- R8 = Round 8
- E64 = End of 64
- E32 = End of 32
- E16 = End of 16
- SF = Semi-finals

Champions	Runners-up	Promoted	Relegated	Cancelled

== Seasons ==
Results of league and cup competitions by season
Season	Division	P	W	D	L	F	A	Pts	Pos	Coupe de France	Coupe de la Ligue	Trophée des Champions	Europe	Name	Goals
Season	League									Coupe de France	Coupe de la Ligue	Trophée des Champions	Europe	Top goalscorer	
1981–82	Div 1	38	12	11	15	43	65	35	12th	SF	n/a	n/a	UEFA Cup Winners' Cup - 2R	Roger Milla	14
1982–83	Div 1	38	9	14	15	41	52	32	17th	E32	n/a	n/a	n/a	Roger Milla	13
1983–84	Div 1	38	14	8	16	36	43	36	10th	E32	n/a	n/a	n/a	Jacques Zimako	8
1984–85	Div 1	38	11	10	17	39	68	32	14th	E16	n/a	n/a	n/a	Thierry Meyer	14
1985–86	Div 1	38	5	10	23	30	79	20	20th	E32	n/a	n/a	n/a	Jean-Roch Testa	8
1986–87	Div 2	34	17	7	10	62	50	41	5th	E32	n/a	n/a	n/a	Gaspard N'Gouete	21
1987–88	Div 2	34	15	3	16	41	52	33	8th	E32	n/a	n/a	n/a	Thierry Meyer	8
1988–89	Div 2	34	14	9	11	46	44	51	5th	n/a	n/a	n/a	n/a	Amara Traoré & Pascal Mariini	12
1989–90	Div 2	34	14	11	9	46	38	39	6th	E64	n/a	n/a	n/a	José Morales	20
1990–91	Div 2	34	12	11	11	46	35	35	6th	E64	n/a	n/a	n/a	Abdoulaye Diallo & Piotr Rzepka	12
1991–92	Div 2	34	16	7	11	56	46	39	4th	SF	n/a	n/a	n/a	Yves Mangione	19
1992–93	Div 2	34	11	15	8	52	39	37	7th	n/a	n/a	n/a	n/a	Yves Mangione	20
1993–94	Div 2	42	21	11	10	44	29	53	**3rd**	E32	n/a	n/a	n/a	Laurent Castro	8
1994–95	Div 1	38	11	11	16	44	56	44	15th	E16	Runners-up	n/a	n/a	Anto Drobnjak	16
1995–96	Div 1	38	12	8	18	45	55	44	15th	E64	E32	n/a	n/a	Anto Drobnjak	20
1996–97	Div 1	38	17	10	11	54	47	61	7th	E32	E32	n/a	n/a	Anto Drobnjak	19
1997–98	Div 1	34	13	11	10	36	31	50	9th	E32	E32	n/a	**UEFA Intertoto Cup - Winners**; UEFA Cup - E32	Ermin Šiljak	9
1998–99	Div 1	34	10	8	16	37	46	38	13th	E64	E32	n/a	UEFA Intertoto Cup - SF	Frédéric Née	14
1999–2000	Div 1	34	11	12	11	43	39	45	10th	E64	SF	n/a	n/a	Frédéric Née	12
2000–01	Div 1	34	13	6	15	45	41	45	8th	E16	E16	n/a	n/a	Frédéric Née	17
2001–02	Div 1	34	12	5	17	38	44	41	11th	Runners-up	QF	n/a	UEFA Intertoto Cup - 2R	Tony Vairelles	19
2002–03	Ligue 1	38	12	11	15	40	48	47	12th	E64	E32	n/a	n/a	Florian Maurice	10
2003–04	Ligue 1	38	9	12	17	33	49	39	17th	E64	E16	n/a	n/a	Florian Maurice	9
2004–05	Ligue 1	38	11	8	19	32	48	41	19th	E64	E16	n/a	n/a	Youssouf Hadji	7
2005–06	Ligue 2	38	16	10	12	47	40	58	6th	E16	R1	n/a	n/a	Pierre-Yves André	12
2006–07	Ligue 2	38	14	11	13	52	49	53	9th	E64	R2	n/a	n/a	Pierre-Yves André	10
2007–08	Ligue 2	38	14	9	15	45	46	49	11th	E16	R2	n/a	n/a	Xavier Pentecôte	13
2008–09	Ligue 2	38	13	9	16	38	47	48	11th	R8	R3	n/a	n/a	Pierre-Yves André	10
2009–10	Ligue 2	38	10	9	19	40	48	39	20th	R7	R1	n/a	n/a	Pierre-Yves André	14
2010–11	Chmp. Nat.	40	27	10	3	81	24	91	**1st**	R7	E16	n/a	n/a	David Suarez	23
2011–12	Ligue 2	38	21	8	9	61	36	71	**1st**	E32	R1	n/a	n/a	Toifilou Maoulida	17
2012–13	Ligue 1	38	13	8	17	50	66	47	12th	E64	QF	n/a	n/a	Anthony Modeste	17
2013–14	Ligue 1	38	13	10	15	42	56	49	10th	E32	E16	n/a	n/a	Gianni Bruno	8
2014–15	Ligue 1	38	12	11	15	37	46	47	12th	E32	Runners-up	n/a	n/a	Floyd Ayité	9
2015–16	Ligue 1	38	14	8	16	36	42	50	10th	E32	R3	n/a	n/a	Floyd Ayité	8
2016–17	Ligue 1	38	8	10	20	29	54	34	20th	E64	R3	n/a	n/a	Enzo Crivelli	10
2017–18	National 3	26	15	8	3	46	18	53	2nd	R6	n/a	n/a	n/a	-	-
2018–19	National 3	24	19	4	1	62	9	61	**1st**	E16	n/a	n/a	n/a	-	-
2019–20	National 2	21	17	2	2	37	15	53	**1st**	R5	n/a	n/a	n/a	-	-
2020–21	National	34	19	9	6	57	28	66	**1st**	R5	n/a	n/a	n/a	Sébastian Da Silva & Antony Robic	12
2021–22	Ligue 2	7	1	3	3	5	8	6	15th	n/a	n/a	n/a	n/a	Maguette Diongue	2
