= 1995–96 SC Bastia season =

SC Bastia
1995–96 season
- Chairman: François Nicolaï
- Manager: Frédéric Antonetti
- Stadium: Stade Armand Cesari
- Division 1: 15th
- Coupe de France: End of 64
- Coupe de la Ligue: End of 32
- Top goalscorer: League: Anto Drobnjak (20); All: Anto Drobnjak (20)
- Highest home attendance: 8,500 vs AS Monaco (7 August 1995)
- Lowest home attendance: 3,000 vs Rennes and Nice (5 April and 11 May 1996)
Home colours	Away colours

French football club SC Bastia's 1995–96 season. Finished 15th place in league. Top scorer of the season, including 20 goals in 20 league matches have been Anto Drobnjak. Was eliminated to Coupe de France end of 64 and the Coupe de la Ligue was able to be among the final 32 teams.

== Transfers ==
=== In ===
Summer

- William and Jean-Jacques Eydelie from Benfica
- Bruno Alicarte from Montpellier
- Rémy Loret from Toulouse
- Piotr Swierczewski from St. Etienne
- Dume Franchi from Bastia B

Winter

- No.

=== Out ===
Summer

- Laurent Casanova to Lyon
- Stéphane Ziani to Rennes
- Pascal Camadini to Perpignan
- Gilles Leclerc to ASOA Valence
- Eric Dewilder to Gazélec Ajaccio
- Jean-Luc Bernard to Beaucaire
- Jacky Canosi to Poitiers
- Bernard Maraval to Sochaux
- Franck Burnier and Flavio to retired

Winter

- No.

== Squad ==
As of 13 November 2012

Note: Flags indicate national team as defined under FIFA eligibility rules; some limited exceptions apply. Players may hold more than one non-FIFA nationality.

No.	Pos.	Nation	Player
—	GK	(France) FRA	André Biancarelli
—	GK	(France) FRA	Bruno Valencony
—	GK	(France) FRA	Dume Franchi
—	DF	(France) FRA	Bruno Alicarte
—	DF	(France) FRA	Pierre Maroselli
—	DF	(Guinea) GUI	Morlaye Soumah
—	DF	(Brazil) BRA	William
—	DF	(France) FRA	Frédéric Darras
—	DF	(France) FRA	Jean-Christophe Debu
—	DF	(France) FRA	Didier Santini
—	DF	(France) FRA	François Caffarel
—	DF	(France) FRA	Yves Frangini
—	DF	(France) FRA	Cyril Rool

No.	Pos.	Nation	Player
—	MF	(France) FRA	Jean-Jacques Eydelie
—	MF	(France) FRA	Laurent Moracchini
—	MF	(Poland) POL	Piotr Świerczewski
—	MF	(France) FRA	Hervé Anziani
—	MF	(Senegal) SEN	Mamadou Faye
—	MF	(France) FRA	Rémy Loret
—	MF	(France) FRA	Sauveur Aiello
—	FW	(France) FRA	Bruno Rodriguez
—	FW	(France) FRA	Franck Vandecasteele
—	FW	(France) FRA	Pierre Laurent
—	FW	(Federal Republic of Yugoslavia) YUG	Anto Drobnjak
—	FW	(Guinea) GUI	Ousmane Soumah

== French Division 1 ==
=== League table ===
Pos	Team	Pld	W	D	L	GF	GA	GD	Pts
13	Le Havre	38	11	12	15	33	45	−12	45
14	Cannes	38	12	8	18	45	51	−6	44
15	Bastia	38	12	8	18	45	55	−10	44
16	Bordeaux	38	11	9	18	44	52	−8	42
17	Lille	38	9	12	17	27	50	−23	39

Source: Ligue 1
Rules for classification: 1) points; 2) goal difference; 3) number of goals scored.

=== Results summary ===
Overall								Home						Away					
Pld	W	D	L	GF	GA	GD	Pts	W	D	L	GF	GA	GD	W	D	L	GF	GA	GD
38	12	8	18	45	55	−10	44	10	6	3	28	14	+14	2	2	15	17	41	−24

Source: LFP

=== Results by round ===
Round	1	2	3	4	5	6	7	8	9	10	11	12	13	14	15	16	17	18	19	20	21	22	23	24	25	26	27	28	29	30	31	32	33	34	35	36	37	38
Ground	H	A	H	H	A	H	A	H	A	H	A	H	A	H	A	H	A	H	A	H	A	A	H	A	H	A	A	H	A	H	H	A	H	A	H	A	H	A
Result	D	W	W	W	L	L	L	W	L	W	L	W	L	D	D	W	L	W	L	W	W	D	D	L	L	L	W	L	L	W	L	D	D	L	D	L	L	L
Position	7	5	1	1	4	7	10	7	9	8	10	7	9	9	10	9	11	8	10	9	5	6	7	8	10	10	10	10	11	11	11	13	13	12	12	12	13	15

A = Away; H = Home; W = Win; D = Draw; L = Loss

=== Matches ===
Date	Opponent	H / A	Result	Goal(s)	Attendance	Referee
18 July 1995	PSG	H	2 - 2	Laurent 21', Drobnjak 89'	7,000	Rémy Harrel
26 July 1995	Lille	A	0 - 2	Drobnjak 32', Rodriguez 59'	8,000	Gilles Chéron
5 August 1995	Bordeaux	H	2 - 0	Rodriguez 12', 70', Rool (red card) 20'	8,000	Gilles Veissière
9 August 1995	Monaco	H	2 - 1	Drobnjak 53', Faye 77'	8,500	Patrick Anton
19 August 1995	St. Étienne	A	3 - 0	Drobnjak (red card) 89'	12,598	Marc Batta
26 August 1995	Gueugnon	H	1 - 2	Rodriguez 84'	7,000	Bernard Saules
30 August 1995	Guingamp	A	1 - 0		10,583	Claude Colombo
9 September 1995	Nantes	H	4 - 1	Rodriguez 21', Drobnjak 44', 54', Loret 71'	6,500	Stéphane Bré
17 September 1995	Lens	A	3 - 1	Drobnjak 55' (pen.)	22,545	Pascal Garibian
22 September 1995	Cannes	H	2 - 1	Lambourde 9' (o.g.), Swierczewski 32'	6,000	Jean-Claude Puyalt
30 September 1995	Rennes	A	2 - 0		6,702	Philippe Leduc
4 October 1995	Le Havre	H	1 - 0	Maroselli 11'	6,000	Gilles Chéron
14 October 1995	Montpellier	A	4 - 3	Laurent 43', Drobnjak 64', 90', Maroselli (yellow card) (yellow-red card) 65', Valencony (red card) 76'	8,907	Gilles Veissière
21 October 1995	Strasbourg	H	1 - 1	Drobnjak 32'	5,000	Didier Pauchard
27 October 1995	Lyon	A	1 - 1	Darras (yellow card) (yellow-red card) 48', Drobnjak 54'	21,779	Pascal Garibian
4 November 1995	Metz	H	1 - 0	Drobnjak 88'	7,000	Patrick Anton
8 November 1995	Auxerre	A	3 - 0		5,000	Bernard Saules
18 November 1995	Martigues	H	2 - 0	Laurent 9', Drobnjak 10'	4,000	Pascal Garibian
25 November 1995	Nice	A	3 - 1	Drobnjak 83'	6,637	Jean-Marc Gonon
1 December 1995	Lille	H	4 - 0	Rodriguez 23', 70', Drobnjak 64', 80' (pen.)	4,500	Claude Colombo
9 December 1995	Bordeaux	A	1 - 3	Rodriguez 43', William Amaral (yellow card) (yellow-red card) 45', Drobnjak 50', Laurent 90'	13,000	Bernard Saules
16 December 1995	Monaco	A	0 - 0		3,500	Alain Sars
10 January 1996	St. Étienne	H	0 - 0		3,500	Michel Bonnichon
20 January 1996	Gueugnon	A	1 - 0		3,777	Marc Batta
27 January 1996	Guingamp	H	0 - 1		3,000	Bernard Saules
7 February 1996	Nantes	A	3 - 1	Drobnjak 34', Eydelie (yellow card) (yellow-red card) 72'	13,591	Éric Poulat
10 February 1996	Lens	H	3 - 2	Déhu 25' (o.g.), Rodriguez 41', 65', Rool (red card) 89'	4,000	Claude Tellène
17 February 1996	Cannes	A	1 - 0		4,000	Pascal Garibian
2 March 1996	Le Havre	A	1 - 0		8,856	Jean-Marc Gonon
9 March 1996	Montpellier	H	1 - 0	Drobnjak 34', Maroselli (yellow card) (yellow-red card) 84'	4,000	Rémy Harrel
23 March 1996	Strasbourg	A	4 - 3	Willam Amaral 31', Laurent 66', Santini 90'	9,237	Michel Bonnichon
30 March 1996	Lyon	H	0 - 0		5,500	Claude Colombo
5 April 1996	Rennes	H	0 - 0		3,000	Jean-Claude Puyalt
10 April 1996	Metz	A	2 - 0		16,791	Philippe Leduc
20 April 1996	Auxerre	H	1 - 1	Rodriguez 39'	6,000	Serge Léon
27 April 1996	Martigues	A	3 - 1	Drobnjak 22'	3,600	Philippe Kalt
11 May 1996	Nice	H	1 - 2	Drobnjak 54' (pen.)	3,000	Claude Tellène
18 May 1996	PSG	A	5 - 1	Laurent 89'	43,071	Didier Pauchard

== Coupe de France ==
Date	Round	Opponent	H / A	Result	Goal(s)	Attendance	Referee
13 January 1996	End of 64	Blénod	A	[ 1 - 0]	Rool (red card) 55'	2,400	Philippe Kalt

== Coupe de la Ligue ==
Date	Round	Opponent	H / A	Result	Goal(s)	Attendance	Referee
13 December 1995	End of 32	Le Havre	A	1 - 0	-	5,286	Didier Pauchard

== Top scorers ==
As of 13 November 2012

Place	Position	Nation	Name	Ligue 1	Coupe de France	Coupe de la Ligue	Total
1	FW	(Federal Republic of Yugoslavia)	Anto Drobnjak	20	0	0	20
2	FW	(France)	Bruno Rodriguez	11	0	0	11
3	FW	(France)	Pierre Laurent	6	0	0	6
4	MF	(Poland)	Piotr Swierczewski	1	0	0	1
=	MF	(France)	Rémy Loret	1	0	0	1
=	DF	(Brazil)	William	1	0	0	1
=	DF	(France)	Pierre Maroselli	1	0	0	1
=	DF	(France)	Didier Santini	1	0	0	1
=	FW	(Senegal)	Mamadou Faye	1	0	0	1
