= Świerczewski =

Świerczewski (feminine: Świerczewska; plural: Świerczewscy) is a Polish surname. It may refer to:

- Karol Świerczewski (1897–1947), Polish and Soviet general
- Marek Świerczewski (born 1967), Polish footballer
- Piotr Świerczewski (born 1972), Polish footballer
