= Frédéric Mendy =

Frédéric Mendy may refer to:

- Frédéric Mendy (footballer, born 1973), French football defender
- Frédéric Mendy (footballer, born 1981), Senegalese football midfielder
- Frédéric Mendy (footballer, born 1988), Bissau-Guinean football forward
