= Krzysztof Nowak =

Polish footballer (1975–2005)

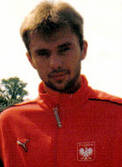

Personal information
- Full name: Krzysztof Damian Nowak
- Date of birth: 27 September 1975
- Place of birth: Warsaw, Poland
- Date of death: 26 May 2005 (aged 29)
- Place of death: Wolfsburg, Germany
- Height: 1.86 m (6 ft 1 in)
- Position: Midfielder

Youth career
- Opal Lubosz
- –1993: Ursus Warsaw

Senior career*
| Years | Team | Apps | (Gls) |
| 1993–1995 | Sokół Pniewy | | |
| 1995 | GKS Tychy | 15 | (0) |
| 1995–1996 | Panachaiki Patras | 13 | (1) |
| 1996 | Legia Warsaw | 1 | (0) |
| 1996–1998 | Atlético Paranaense | 25 | (3) |
| 1998–2002 | VfL Wolfsburg | 83 | (10) |

International career
| 1997–1999 | Poland | 10 | (1) |
- * Club domestic league appearances and goals

Krzysztof Nowak (Polish pronunciation: [ˈkʂɨʂtɔf ˈnɔvak]; 27 September 1975 – 26 May 2005) was a Polish footballer who played as a midfielder, best known for his stint with German club VfL Wolfsburg.

Nowak began playing football in 1985. He slowly rose in prominence and in 1996 moved to Brazil with fellow countryman Mariusz Piekarski to play for Atlético Paranaense. He always wanted to play in Europe, so he moved to Germany in 1998 to play for Wolfsburg. Nowak, dubbed "ten of hearts" by his fans, was popular as well as skilled, but was forced to retire from the sport in early 2002 after he learned he had motor neurone disease (MND). Nowak continued to watch the games until shortly before dying from his illness.

Nowak was also an important player for the Poland national team, for whom he played 10 games and scored one goal.

In 2002, Nowak began a foundation to help find a cure for MND. Nowak left behind a wife, Beata, and two young children – a son, Maksymillian, and a daughter, Maria. The ALS Ice Bucket Challenge brought the foundation in Germany much attention, since many Germans who participated in it, donated the money to the foundation.
