= Laurent Weber =

French footballer (born 1972)

Personal information
- Date of birth: 1 September 1972 (age 54)
- Place of birth: Colmar, France
- Height: 1.81 m (5 ft 11 in)
- Position: Goalkeeper

Youth career
- 1989–1993: Strasbourg

Senior career*
Years	Team	Apps	(Gls)
1993–1996	Strasbourg	1	(0)
1993–1994	→ Louhans-Cuiseaux (loan)	30	(0)
1995–1996	→ Valenciennes (loan)	3	(0)
1996–1997	Bastia	3	(0)
1997–2000	Troyes	81	(0)
2000–2002	Beauvais	72	(0)
2002–2003	Nancy	14	(0)
2003–2008	Istres	49	(0)
2005–2006	→ Reims (loan)	34	(0)
Total		287	(0)
- * Club domestic league appearances and goals

Laurent Weber (born 1 September 1972) is a French former professional footballer who played as a goalkeeper. During a 15-year playing career, he represented numerous clubs in the top two divisions of French football, making over 250 senior league appearances.
