= Bertrange, Moselle =

Bertrange
- Commune
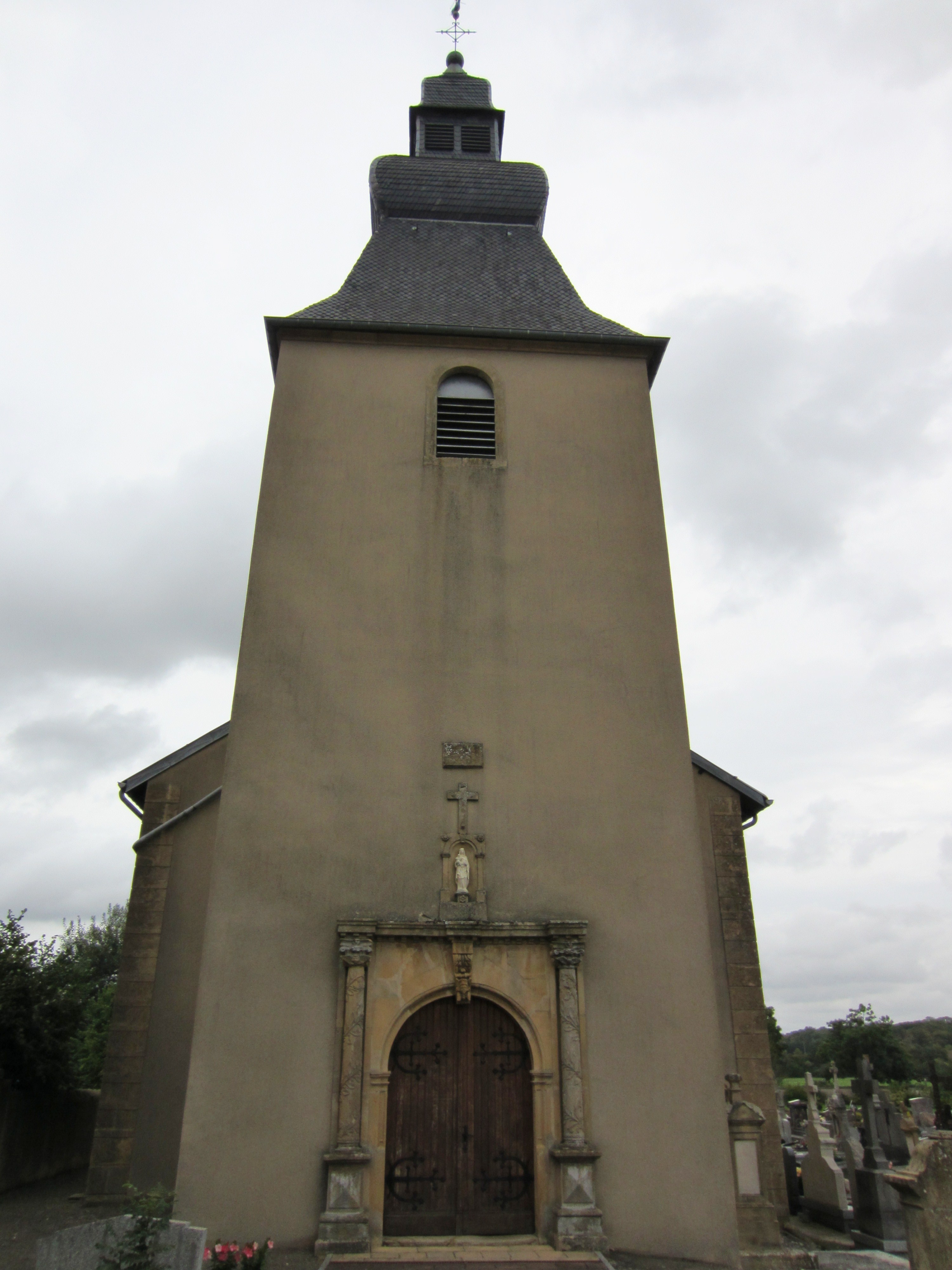
- The church in Bertrange

- Coat of arms
- Location of Bertrange
- Location within France Location within Grand Est
- Coordinates: 49°18′41″N 6°11′16″E
- Country: France
- Region: Grand Est
- Department: Moselle
- Arrondissement: Thionville
- Canton: Metzervisse
- Intercommunality: Arc mosellan

Government
  - Mayor (2020–2026): Jean-Luc Perrin
- Area^{1}: 6.82 km^{2} (2.63 sq mi)
- Elevation: 156 m (512 ft)
- Highest elevation: 207 m (679 ft)
- Lowest elevation: 151 m (495 ft)
- Population (2023): 2,941
  - Density: 431/km^{2} (1,120/sq mi)
- Time zone: UTC+01:00 (CET)
  - Summer (DST): UTC+02:00 (CEST)
- INSEE/Postal code: 57067 /57310
- ^{1} French Land Register data, which excludes lakes, ponds, glaciers > 1 km^{2} (0.386 sq mi or 247 acres) and river estuaries.

Bertrange (French pronunciation: [bɛʁtʁɑ̃ʒ]; Lorraine Franconian: Bertréngen/Bertréng; German: Bertringen) is a commune in the Moselle department in Grand Est in northeastern France.

== Population ==
Historical population
Year	Pop.	±% p.a.
1968	1,522	—
1975	1,580	+0.54%
1982	1,900	+2.67%
1990	1,900	+0.00%
1999	1,994	+0.54%
2007	2,224	+1.37%
2012	2,733	+4.21%
2017	2,691	−0.31%
2023	2,941	+1.49%
Source: INSEE

== See also ==
- Communes of the Moselle department
