= Marek Świerczewski =

Polish footballer

Personal information
- Date of birth: 2 March 1967 (age 59)
- Place of birth: Nowy Sącz, Poland
- Height: 1.83 m (6 ft 0 in)
- Position: Defender

Youth career
- Sandecja Nowy Sącz

Senior career*
Years	Team	Apps	(Gls)
1981–1988	Wisła Kraków	108	(19)
1988–1995	GKS Katowice	190	(21)
1996–1997	Sturm Graz	52	(4)
1997–1998	Austria Wien	24	(3)
1998–1999	Austria Wien II	27	(0)
1999	Hutnik Kraków	8	(0)
1999–2002	GKS Katowice	85	(8)
2002–2004	Admira Wacker Mödling	53	(2)
2004	1. Simmeringer SC		
2005–2009	ISS Admira Landhaus		
2009	Favoritner AC		
2009	FC Polska Wien		

International career
- Poland U18
1994–1995	Poland	6	(0)
Medal record
Men's football
Representing Poland
UEFA European Under-18 Championship
Third place	1984 Soviet Union
- * Club domestic league appearances and goals

Marek Świerczewski (born 2 March 1967) is a Polish former professional footballer who played as a defender. He played for ten teams over the course of a 28-year football career. His younger brother Piotr is also a former footballer and Poland international.

== Honours ==
GKS Katowice

- Polish Cup: 1990–91, 1992–93
- Polish Super Cup: 1991

Sturm Graz

- Austrian Cup: 1995–96, 1996–97
- Austrian Supercup: 1996

Poland U18

- UEFA European Under-18 Championship third place: 1984
