= David Mazzoncini =

French footballer (born 1971)

Personal information
- Date of birth: 16 October 1971 (age 55)
- Place of birth: Bertrange, France
- Height: 1.71 m (5 ft 7 in)
- Positions: Defender; midfielder

Senior career*
Years	Team	Apps	(Gls)
1990–1996	Martigues	157	(6)
1996–1998	Le Havre	40	(0)
1998	Cannes	11	(1)
1998–2000	Bastia	22	(0)
2001	Changchun Yatai		
2002	Shenzhen Ping An		
2002–2003	Las Palmas		
2003–2004	Al-Sailiya		
2006–2008	Orléans		
2008–2009	Saint-Pryvé Saint-Hilaire		
- * Club domestic league appearances and goals

David Mazzoncini (born 16 October 1971) is a French former professional footballer who played as a defender and midfielder.

== Career ==
Born in Bertrange, Mazzoncini played for Martigues, Le Havre, Cannes, Bastia, Changchun Yatai, Shenzhen Ping An, Las Palmas, Al-Sailiya, Orléans and Saint-Pryvé Saint-Hilaire.

He was critical of football in Qatar, describing players as being like "puppets" for the club's owners.

He retired from football in 2011, with a "jubilee" match being played in his honour.

During the 2022 FIFA World Cup. he was employed as the Logistics Manager for the France national football team in Doha.
