= David Faderne =

French footballer (born 1970)

Personal information
- Date of birth: 15 January 1970 (age 56)
- Place of birth: Metz, France
- Height: 1.80 m (5 ft 11 in)
- Position: Forward

Team information
- Current team: USC Corte (manager)

Senior career*
Years	Team	Apps	(Gls)
1992–1993	Gueugnon	26	(4)
1993–1996	Amiens	66	(12)
1996–2000	Ajaccio	93	(41)
2000–2001	Bastia	2	(0)
2001	Caen	17	(8)
2001–2006	Ajaccio	26	(3)
Total		230	(68)

Managerial career
- 2010–2015: Ajaccio U-19
- 2015–: USC Corte
- * Club domestic league appearances and goals

David Faderne (born 15 January 1970) is a French former professional footballer who played as a forward. He is the manager of USC Corte. He played in Ligue 1 with SC Bastia and AC Ajaccio.
