= Cyril Eboki Poh =

French footballer (born 1979)

Personal information
- Date of birth: 11 September 1979 (age 47)
- Place of birth: Montreuil, France
- Height: 1.83 m (6 ft 0 in)
- Position: Striker

Senior career*
Years	Team	Apps	(Gls)
1996–1999	Cannes	12	(1)
1999–2002	Bastia	2	(0)
2003	Bastia B		
2004	Sora		
2004–2010	CA Bastia	0	(0)
2010–2013	Furiani-Agliani	0	(0)
- * Club domestic league appearances and goals

Cyril Eboki Poh (born 11 September 1979) is a French former professional footballer who played as a striker. He played on the professional level in Ligue 1 for AS Cannes and SC Bastia and in Ligue 2 for AS Cannes.

== Career ==
Eboki had a trial for Burnley and played in a friendly match against Dundee United.
