= Jacques Cristofari =

French professional football player (born 1978)

Personal information
- Date of birth: 8 August 1978 (age 48)
- Place of birth: Bastia, France
- Height: 1.78 m (5 ft 10 in)
- Position: Defender

Youth career
- 1995–1998: Bastia

Senior career*
Years	Team	Apps	(Gls)
1998–1999	Bastia	1	(0)
1999–2001	Gazélec Ajaccio	51	(1)
2001–2002	Boulogne	28	(1)
2002–2004	Gazélec Ajaccio	61	(5)
2004–2005	CA Bastia		
2005–2008	Gazélec Ajaccio	83	(2)
2008–2012	CA Bastia	110	(6)
2012–2015	Borgo FC		
2015–2016	Furiani-Agliani		
- * Club domestic league appearances and goals

Jacques Cristofari (born 8 August 1978) is a French former professional footballer who played as a defender.

He played one match in Ligue 1 for SC Bastia, coming on as a substitute in a 1–1 draw with Le Havre on 16 January 1999.
