= Wilfried Gohel =

French footballer (born 1968)

Personal information
- Date of birth: 12 October 1968 (age 58)
- Place of birth: Cherbourg, France
- Height: 1.79 m (5 ft 10 in)
- Position: Forward

Senior career*
| Years | Team | Apps | (Gls) |
| 1985–1993 | Valenciennes | 101 | (16) |
| 1993–1996 | Strasbourg | 78 | (5) |
| 1996–1998 | Bastia | 53 | (7) |
| 1998–2001 | Cannes | 78 | (9) |
| 2001–2002 | Changchun Yatai | | |
- * Club domestic league appearances and goals

Wilfried Gohel (born 12 October 1968) is a French former professional footballer who played as a forward.

== Career ==
Gohel started his career with French side Valenciennes, where he was regarded as one of the club's most important players and helped them achieve promotion from the Ligue 2 to the Ligue 1. In 1985, he signed for Ligue 1 side Strasbourg, where he played in the European Cup.

Three years later, he signed for French Ligue 1 side Bastia. Following his stint there, he signed for French Ligue 1 side Cannes in 1998. Subsequently, he signed for Chinese side Changchun Yatai.

== Style of play ==
Gohel played as a forward. French newspaper La Voix du Nord wrote in 2014 that he was "a bit of a symbol of an era when little guys still had a chance... a cheeky player who often made the difference. 1.40 m, but legs of fire".

== Personal life ==
Gohel was born on 12 October 1968 in Cherbourg, France and is a native of the city. After retiring from professional football, Gohel worked in the restaurant industry.
