= Dan Petersen =

Danish footballer (born 1972)

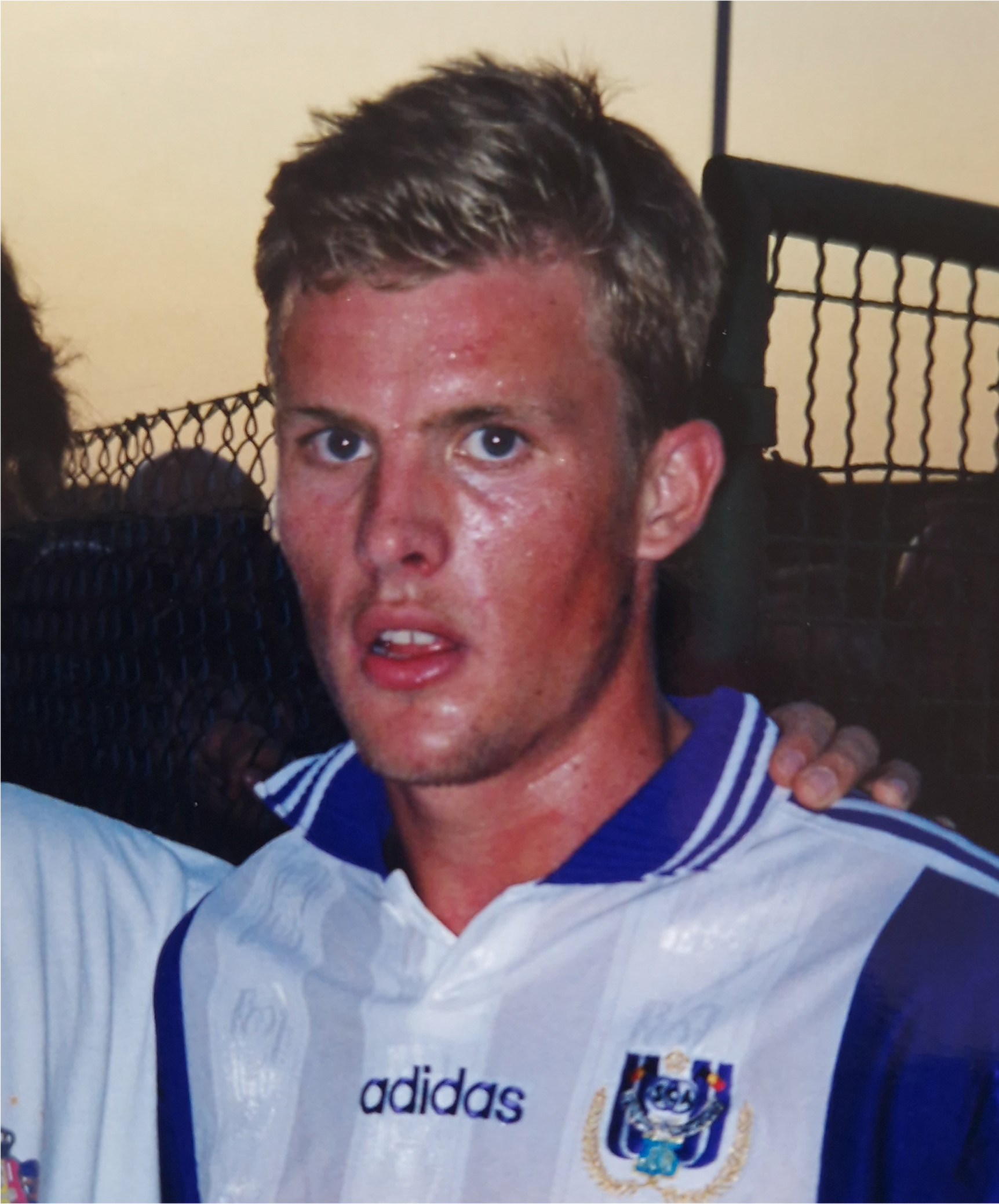
- Petersen with Anderlecht in 1997

Personal information
- Date of birth: 6 May 1972 (age 54)
- Place of birth: Odense, Denmark
- Height: 1.85 m (6 ft 1 in)
- Position: Forward

Senior career*
Years	Team	Apps	(Gls)
1990–1991	OB	14	(2)
1991–1994	Ajax	43	(3)
1994–1997	Monaco	48	(11)
1997–1999	Anderlecht	19	(1)
1999–2001	Bastia	26	(3)
Total		150	(20)

International career
1991	Denmark U-19	1	(1)
1992	Denmark U-21	1	(0)
- * Club domestic league appearances and goals

Dan Petersen (born 6 May 1972) is a Danish former professional footballer who played as a forward.

At Monaco he was part of the side that won the 1996–97 French Division 1 title, making 10 appearances in the process.
