= Yann Lachuer =

French football manager and former player (born 1972)

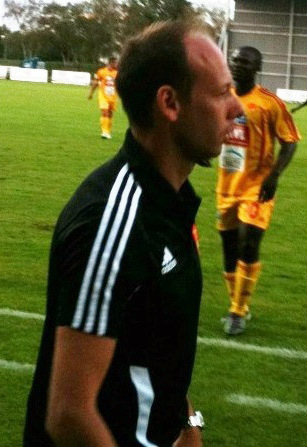
- Lachuer with Orléans in 2011

Personal information
- Date of birth: 5 August 1972 (age 54)
- Place of birth: Champigny-sur-Marne, France
- Height: 1.75 m (5 ft 9 in)
- Position: Midfielder

Team information
- Current team: Romorantin (Head coach)

Senior career*
Years	Team	Apps	(Gls)
1992–1993	Créteil	31	(5)
1993–1998	Auxerre	104	(21)
1996–1997	→ Châteauroux	32	(9)
1998–1999	Paris Saint-Germain	22	(1)
1999–2001	Bastia	65	(7)
2001–2006	Auxerre	158	(15)
2006–2007	Troyes	37	(3)
2007–2008	Châteauroux	17	(3)
2008–2009	Orléans		

Managerial career
- 2009–2012: Orléans
- 2016–2017: Saran
- 2017–2018: US Créteil
- 2018–: Romorantin
- * Club domestic league appearances and goals

Yann Lachuer (born 5 August 1972) is a French football coach and former professional player who coaches SO Romorantin.

== Playing career ==
Lachuer began his career in the 1992–93 season with US Créteil-Lusitanos in Ligue 2 the second tier of French Football, making 31 appearances and scoring five goals. His displays brought him to the attention of AJ Auxerre, for whom he signed in 1993. He was limited to just two first team appearances in the following seasons until a loan spell with LB Châteauroux in the 1996–97 season. This was a most productive spell for Lachuer, where he found the net nine times in 32 games. He continued this rich vein of form the next season, following his return to Auxerre, grabbing seven goals in 28 domestic appearances. He played seven times in the UEFA Cup but did not find the target.

1998–99 saw Lachuer move to Paris Saint-Germain, where he endured a rather disappointing season, failing to live up to the standards he had set himself in the previous two years. A solitary goal in 22 games for PSG, was sufficient for them to move him on to another club at the end of the season. A highlight was scoring the winning goal as PSG won the 1998 Trophée des Champions.

For the next two seasons, he plied his trade on the island of Corsica with SC Bastia, scoring seven times in 65 appearances for the club. He returned to AJ Auxerre for a second spell in 2001–02, scoring three goals as Auxerre qualified for the UEFA Champions League. The following season he contributed four goals as Auxerre won the Coupe de France, their first major honour since completing the League and Cup double in 1995–96.

Winning the Coupe de France ensured Auxerre qualified for the UEFA Cup where Lachuer scored his first goal in European competition, to go alongside the three league goals he amassed as Auxerre finished 4th in Ligue 1. In doing so they managed to qualify for the UEFA Cup for the second successive season. In the 2004–05 season he scored only his second-ever European goal, again in the UEFA Cup. He also notched up 24 club appearances as Auxerre won the Coupe de France for the second time in three seasons.

2005–06 proved to be Lachuer's last season with Auxerre. He managed four goals in 27 appearances for the club. Lachuer opted not to renew his contract with Auxerre after it expired, preferring instead to pursue his career elsewhere. After considering offers from AS Nancy, OGC Nice, Le Mans UC72, AS Saint-Étienne and clubs in Italy and the United Arab Emirates, he opted to sign a one-year deal with Troyes.

He outlined his reasons for opting for Troyes in several interviews, stating that he was attracted by their style of play. After a one-year contract with Troyes where he led Ligue 1 with 10 assists he signed a contract with L2 team, LB Châteauroux.

Lachuer remains a popular figure in French football and is widely regarded by many fans, as one of the best players never to appear for Les Bleus.

== Coaching career ==
In November 2018, he became the head coach of Romorantin.

== Personal life ==
Lachuer is the brother of Julien Lachuer, and the uncle of Mathis Lachuer, both professional footballers.

== Honours ==
Auxerre

- Division 1: 1995–96
- Coupe de France: 1995–96, 2002-03, 2004-05
