= Lilian Nalis =

French footballer (born 1971)

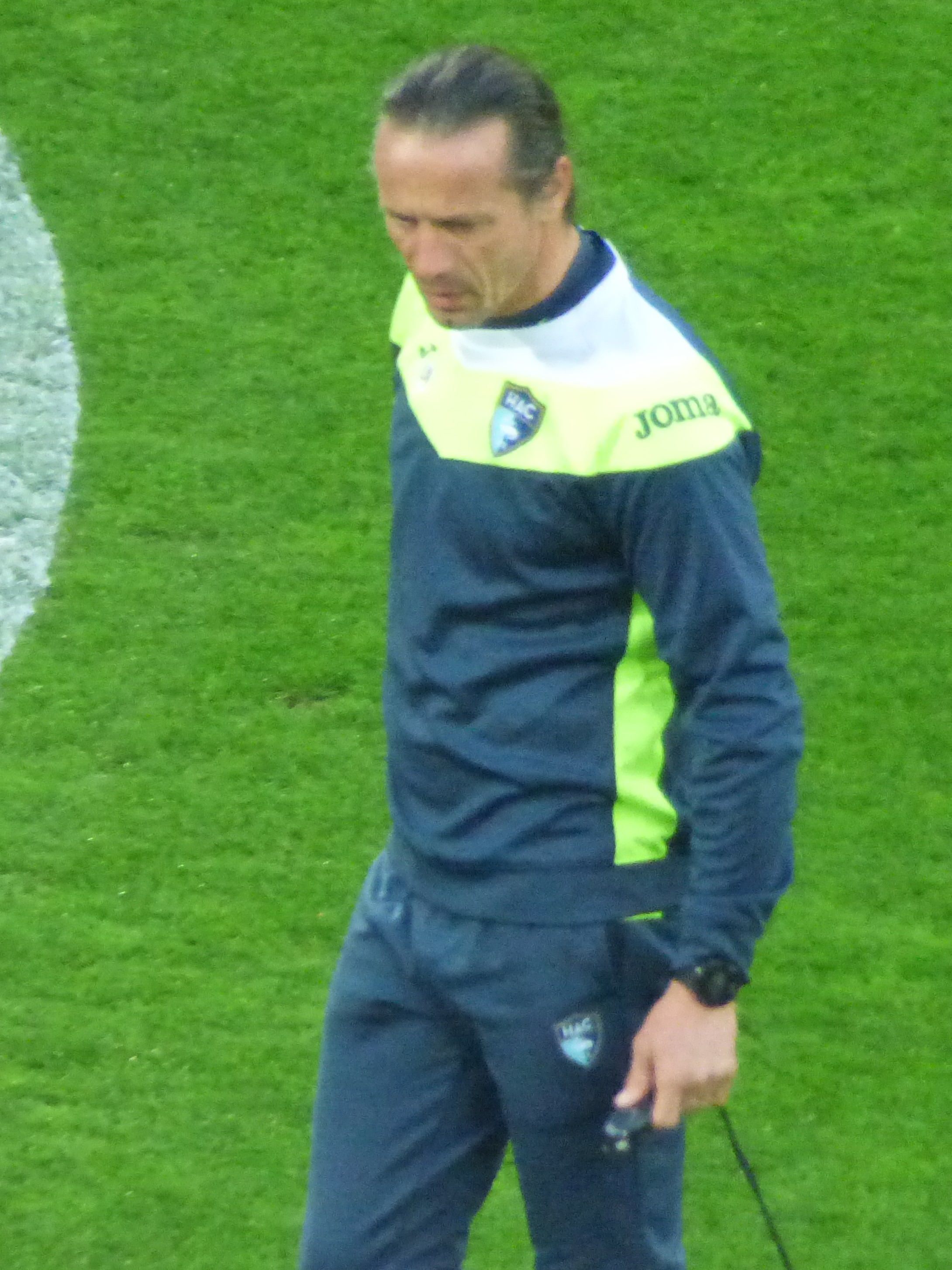
- Nalis in 2019

Personal information
- Full name: Lilian Bernard Pierre Nalis
- Date of birth: 29 September 1971 (age 55)
- Place of birth: Nogent-sur-Marne, France
- Height: 1.85 m (6 ft 1 in)
- Position: Midfielder

Team information
- Current team: Rennes (assistant coach)

Senior career*
Years	Team	Apps	(Gls)
1992–1993	Auxerre	0	(0)
1993–1995	Caen	21	(0)
1995–1997	Laval	81	(12)
1997–1998	Guingamp	30	(0)
1998–1999	Le Havre	27	(3)
1999–2002	Bastia	82	(3)
2002–2003	Chievo	8	(0)
2003–2005	Leicester City	59	(6)
2005–2006	Sheffield United	4	(0)
2005	→ Coventry City (loan)	6	(2)
2006–2008	Plymouth Argyle	102	(6)
2008–2009	Swindon Town	24	(0)
2009–2010	CA Bastia	25	(0)
Total		469	(32)

Managerial career
- 2010–2014: CA Bastia (assistant)
- 2014–2016: Laval (assistant)
- 2016–2019: AC Le Havre (assistant)
- 2020–2024: RC Lens (assistant)
- 2024–2025: Nice (assistant)
- 2026–: Rennes (assistant)
- * Club domestic league appearances and goals

Lilian Bernard Pierre Nalis (born 29 September 1971) is a French football coach and former player he is the currently assistant head coach of Ligue 1 club Rennes.

Nalis played in Ligue 1 for Caen, Guingamp, Le Havre and Bastia, Serie A for Chievo, the Premier League for Leicester City, and the Football League for Leicester, Sheffield United, Coventry City, Plymouth Argyle and Swindon Town.

== Playing career ==
Born in Nogent-sur-Marne, Nalis started his career in his home country of France, playing for a wide variety of French clubs including Le Havre, Caen, Guingamp and Bastia. After three seasons with Bastia, Nalis moved onto the Italian side Chievo.

After a bad spell of form at Chievo, Nalis was sold to English side Leicester City in 2003 who had just earned promotion to the Premiership. Despite Leicester being relegated straight back to the Football League Championship, Nalis stayed with the team. His only goal in the Premiership for City was one of his best, scoring against Leeds United with a smashing 25-yard volley in 2003.

During the summer 2005, Nalis was transferred to Sheffield United but after losing his place in the side early in the season, he went on loan with Coventry City before moving to Plymouth Argyle in January 2006. Nalis was voted the fans player of the year for the 2006–07 season and signed a one-year extension to his contract.

It was announced in April 2008 that Nalis would be released by Plymouth Argyle when his contract expired in June.

On 31 July 2008, Nalis signed for Swindon following a brief trial.

After his final season in England, Nalis returned to France, by signing for the Corsica-based side of CA Bastia.

== Coaching career ==
After retiring at the end of the 2009–10 season, Nalis was appointed assistant manager of CA Bastia. He worked for the club until the summer 2014, where he was appointed assistant manager of Laval. He was at the club for two and a half years, before joining Le Havre, also as an assistant manager.

On 10 July 2019, Bastia announced that Nalis had returned to the club as a technical advisor for the club's academy.

On 9 May 2020, it was announced that Nalis would be joining Lens as one of the assistants to Franck Haise.
