= Frédéric Darras =

French footballer (1966-2010)

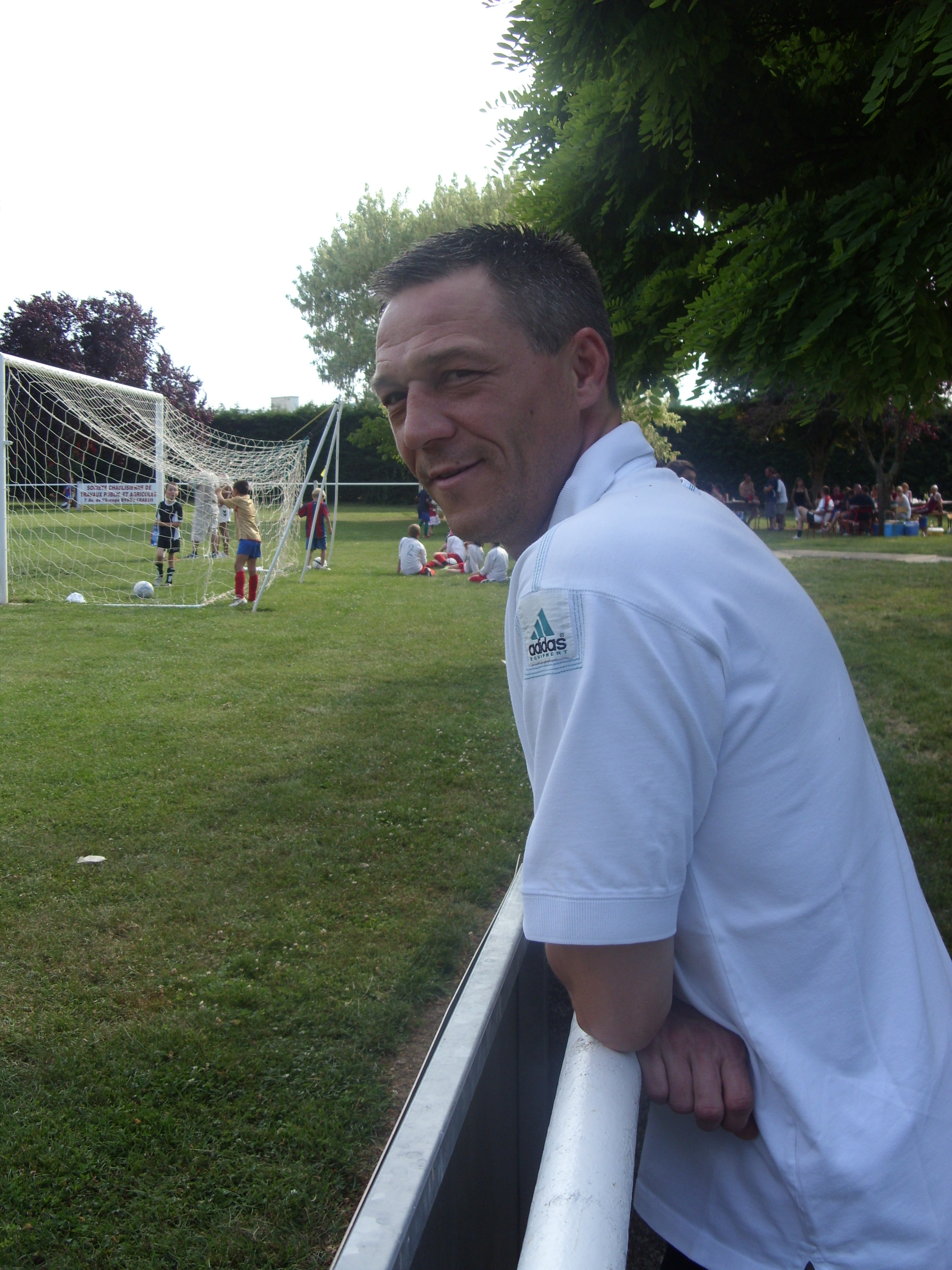
- Darras in 2009

Personal information
- Date of birth: 19 August 1966
- Place of birth: Guînes, France
- Date of death: 27 October 2010 (aged 44)
- Place of death: Maligny, France
- Height: 1.76 m (5 ft 9 in)
- Position: Defender

Youth career
- 1976–1981: Guînes
- 1981–1987: Auxerre

Senior career*
Years	Team	Apps	(Gls)
1987–1992	Auxerre	129	(1)
1992–1994	Sochaux	54	(0)
1994–1996	Bastia	39	(0)
1996–1998	Swindon Town	50	(0)
1998–1999	Red Star 93	37	(0)
Total		309	(1)
- * Club domestic league appearances and goals

Frédéric Darras (19 August 1966 – 27 October 2010) was a French football defender who played over 200 matches in Ligue 1 and had a spell playing in the English First Division.

== Career ==
Born in Guînes, Darras began playing youth football with ES Guînes. At age 15, he was recruited by Guy Roux to the youth side of AJ Auxerre. He joined the club's professional team in 1987, and would make over 100 senior appearances for the club before leaving in 1992. Darras joined Ligue 1 rivals FC Sochaux-Montbéliard and SC Bastia. He was part of the Bastia squad that reached the 1995 Coupe de la Ligue Final.

Darras signed with Swindon Town in August 1996. He made 55 senior appearances during his two seasons with the club.

Darras returned to France in 1998 and finished his playing career with Ligue 2 side FC Red Star Saint-Ouen.

== Personal ==
Darras died after suffering a heart attack on 27 October 2010.
