= Mariusz Piekarski =

Polish footballer

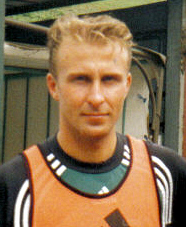
- Piekarski

Personal information
- Date of birth: 22 March 1975 (age 51)
- Place of birth: Białystok, Poland
- Height: 1.79 m (5 ft 10 in)
- Position: Midfielder

Senior career*
Years	Team	Apps	(Gls)
1990–1993	Jagiellonia Białystok	7	(1)
1993–1995	Polonia Gdańsk		
1995–1996	Zagłębie Lubin	16	(1)
1996–1997	Clube Atlético Paranaense	15	(1)
1997	Flamengo	10	(0)
1998	Mogi Mirim		
1998–1999	Bastia	13	(0)
1999–2002	Legia Warsaw	40	(4)
2002–2003	Anorthosis Famagusta	6	(0)

International career
1998–2002	Poland	2	(0)
- * Club domestic league appearances and goals

Mariusz Piekarski (born 22 March 1975) is a Polish football agent and former player who played as a midfielder.

== Career ==
Born in Białystok, Piekarski moved to Brazil with fellow countryman Krzysztof Nowak in 1996 to play for Atlético Paranaense. After one year, he joined Flamengo where he stayed for five months, also playing for Mogi Mirim before returning to Europe.

He retired in 2002 after an ankle injury sustained in a match for Anorthosis Famagusta, also suffering two cruciate ligaments injuries in his knees before. After retirement, he worked as an agent and intermediated the transfer of Roger Guerreiro and Edson to Poland.

In 2003, he was charged with bigamy after marrying a second wife before he was legally divorced from former Miss Brasil Kelley Vieira, who he met when playing in the South American country.

He played twice for Poland in friendly matches, making his debut in a 4–0 loss to Paraguay in 1998 and his second and final appearance as a starter in a 2–1 win against Faroe Islands.

== Honours ==
Legia Warsaw

- Ekstraklasa: 2001–02
- Polish League Cup: 2001–02

Anorthosis Famagusta

- Cypriot Cup: 2002–03
