= José Clayton =

Tunisian footballer

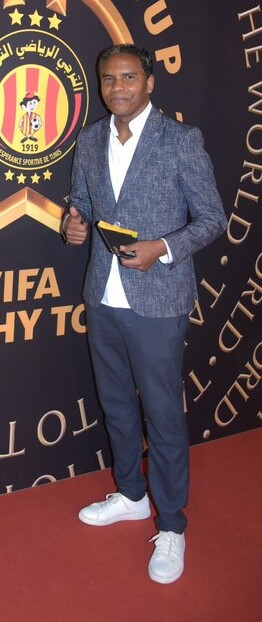
- Clayton in 2025

Personal information
- Full name: José Cláyton Menezes Ribeiro
- Date of birth: 21 March 1974 (age 52)
- Place of birth: São Luís, Brazil
- Height: 1.80 m (5 ft 11 in)
- Positions: Left-back; left midfielder

Senior career*
Years	Team	Apps	(Gls)
1992–1994	Moto Club		
1995–1998	Étoile du Sahel	86	(12)
1998–2001	Bastia	43	(1)
2001	Stade Tunisien	12	(2)
2001–2005	Espérance de Tunis	119	(16)
2005–2006	Al Sadd	22	(0)
2006–2007	Sakaryaspor	26	(0)
2007–2008	Stade Gabèsien		

International career
1998–2006	Tunisia	39	(4)

Managerial career
- 2023–2024: Espérance de Tunis (assistant)
Medal record
Men's football
Representing Tunisia
Africa Cup of Nations
Winner	2004 Tunisia
- * Club domestic league appearances and goals

José Cláyton Menezes Ribeiro (Arabic: جوزيه كلايتون مينيزيس ريبيرو ; born 21 March 1974), known as José Clayton or just Clayton, is a Tunisian former professional football who played as a left-back.

Born in Brazil, he became a naturalised Tunisian citizen, and represented their national football team.

== Career ==
Born in Brazil, Clayton spent a large part of his club career in Tunisia playing for Étoile du Sahel and Espérance de Tunis.

He had a brief spell with Sakaryaspor in the Turkish Süper Lig. He also spent time with Qatari-based side Al Sadd. He won the Q-League title in 2006. In 2006, he left Al Sadd for Turkish club Sakaryaspor.

== International career ==
Clayton became a naturalized citizen in time for the 1998 FIFA World Cup. He played for Tunisia twice in that tournament, as well as one match in 2002.

He was an over-age player on the Tunisian 2004 Olympic football team that exited in the first round, finishing third in Group C, behind group and gold medal winners Argentina and runners-up Australia. He was part of the squad that won the 2004 African Cup of Nations.

He made 39 appearances scoring four goals for Tunisia.

== Career statistics ==
Scores and results list Tunisia's goal tally first, score column indicates score after each Clayton goal.

List of international goals scored by José Clayton
No.	Date	Venue	Opponent	Score	Result	Competition
1	5 June 2004	Stade Olympique de Radès, Tunis, Tunisia	Botswana	1–0	4–1	2006 FIFA World Cup qualification
2	26 March 2005	Stade Olympique de Radès, Tunis, Tunisia	Malawi	4–0	7–0	2006 FIFA World Cup qualification
3	11 June 2005	Stade Olympique de Radès, Tunis, Tunisia	Guinea	1–0	2–0	2006 FIFA World Cup qualification
4	8 October 2005	Stade Olympique de Radès, Tunis, Tunisia	Morocco	1–1	2–2	2006 FIFA World Cup qualification

== Personal life ==
Born in Brazil, Clayton spent most of his career in Tunisia, where he converted to Islam and lives, marrying a woman from Sousse. He obtained Tunisian citizenship in 1998.

== Honours ==
Tunisia

- Africa Cup of Nations: 2004
