= Christophe Deguerville =

French footballer (born 1970)

Personal information
- Date of birth: 27 June 1970 (age 56)
- Place of birth: Villeneuve-la-Garenne, France
- Height: 1.73 m (5 ft 8 in)
- Position: Left-back

Senior career*
Years	Team	Apps	(Gls)
1987–1995	Saint-Étienne	213	(5)
1995–1997	Lyon	50	(0)
1997–2002	Bastia	87	(0)
2002–2003	Saint-Étienne	9	(0)
Total		359	(5)
- * Club domestic league appearances and goals

Christophe Deguerville (born 27 June 1970) is a French former professional footballer who played as a left-back for Saint-Étienne (two spells), Lyon and Bastia.
