= Franck Matingou =

Association football player (born 1979)

Personal information
- Full name: Franck Matingou
- Date of birth: 4 December 1979 (age 46)
- Place of birth: Nice, France
- Height: 1.81 m (5 ft 11 in)
- Position: Midfielder

Senior career*
Years	Team	Apps	(Gls)
1995–1998	Martigues	29	(0)
1999–2006	Bastia	91	(0)
2008–2009	Red Star	26	(5)
Total		146	(5)

International career
2004–2006	DR Congo	7	(0)
- * Club domestic league appearances and goals

Franck Matingou (born 4 December 1979) is a former professional footballer who played as a midfielder. Born in France, he represented the Democratic Republic of Congo national team at the international level.

== Club career ==
Matingou was born in Nice, France. After a short trial with Dundee United, he returned to SC Bastia when a transfer fee was requested. He was subsequently released by Bastia in September 2006 to return to Dundee United for another trial. In February 2007, Matingou also had a trial with AFC Bournemouth .

== International career ==
Matingou was part of the Congolese squad at the 2004 African Nations Cup, where the team finished bottom of their group in the first round and failed to qualify for the quarter-finals.

== Career statistics ==
=== International ===
Appearances and goals by national team and year
National team	Year	Apps	Goals
DR Congo	2004	2	0
DR Congo	2005	1	0
DR Congo	2006	4	0
Total		7	0
