= Éric Durand =

French footballer (born 1965)

Personal information
- Date of birth: 13 August 1965 (age 61)
- Place of birth: Génelard, France
- Height: 1.78 m (5 ft 10 in)
- Position: Goalkeeper

Senior career*
| Years | Team | Apps | (Gls) |
| 1986–1992 | Gueugnon | 198 | (0) |
| 1992–1997 | FC Martigues | 165 | (0) |
| 1997–2001 | Bastia | 128 | (0) |
| 2001–2003 | Rennes | 28 | (0) |
| Total | | 519 | (0) |

Managerial career
- 2005: Bastia (Caretaker)
- * Club domestic league appearances and goals

Éric Durand (born 13 August 1965) is a French former professional footballer who played as a goalkeeper. His nephew, Baptiste, also plays as a goalkeeper.
