= Prince Daye =

Liberian former footballer

Personal information
- Date of birth: 11 April 1978 (age 48)
- Place of birth: Monrovia, Liberia
- Height: 1.75 m (5 ft 9 in)
- Position: Midfielder

Senior career*
Years	Team	Apps	(Gls)
1995–1996	Real Republican		
1996–1997	Invincible Eleven		
1997–2002	Bastia	93	(13)
2002–2003	Club Africain		
2003–2004	Badajoz	11	(1)
2004–2005	Maccabi Petah Tikva	26	(4)
2006–2007	Al-Sailiya		
Total		130+	(18+)

International career
1996–2004	Liberia	25	(7)
- * Club domestic league appearances and goals

Prince Daye (born 11 April 1978) is a Liberian former professional footballer who played as a midfielder.

== Career ==
Daye played in Ghana for Real Republican, in Liberia for Invincible Eleven, in France for Bastia, in Tunisia for Club Africain, in Spain for Badajoz, in Israel for Maccabi Petah Tikva and in Qatar for Al-Sailiya. After leaving Al-Sailiya in 2007, Daye trialled with Major League Soccer side Los Angeles Galaxy.

Daye also earned 25 caps for Liberia between 1996 and 2004, scoring seven goals. During his international career, Daye appeared in 10 FIFA World Cup qualifying matches.

== Career statistics ==
Appearances and goals by national team and year
National team	Year	Apps	Goals
Liberia	1996	3	0
Liberia	1997	2	1
Liberia	1998	2	0
Liberia	2000	3	1
Liberia	2001	8	2
Liberia	2002	5	2
Liberia	2003	1	1
Liberia	2004	1	0
Total		25	7

Scores and results list Liberia's goal tally first, score column indicates score after each Daye goal.

List of international goals scored by Prince Daye
No.	Date	Venue	Opponent	Score	Result	Competition	Ref.
1	8 June 1997	Samuel Kanyon Doe Sports Complex, Paynesville, Liberia	Namibia	1–0	1–2	1998 FIFA World Cup qualification	
2	16 December 2000	FNB Stadium, Johannesburg, South Africa	South Africa	1–2	1–2	2002 African Cup of Nations qualification	
3	14 January 2001	Samuel Kanyon Doe Sports Complex, Paynesville, Liberia	Congo	5–1	5–1	2002 African Cup of Nations qualification	
4	25 March 2001	Stade Municipal, Pointe-Noire, Republic of the Congo	Congo	1–0	1–0	2002 African Cup of Nations qualification	
5	25 January 2002	Stade du 26 Mars, Bamako, Mali	Algeria	1–0	2–2	2002 African Cup of Nations	
6	12 October 2002	Samuel Kanyon Doe Sports Complex, Paynesville, Liberia	Niger	1–0	1–0	2004 African Cup of Nations qualification	
7	21 June 2003	Accra Sports Stadium, Accra, Ghana	Guinea	1–1	1–2	2004 African Cup of Nations qualification	
