= Franck Jurietti =

French footballer (born 1975)

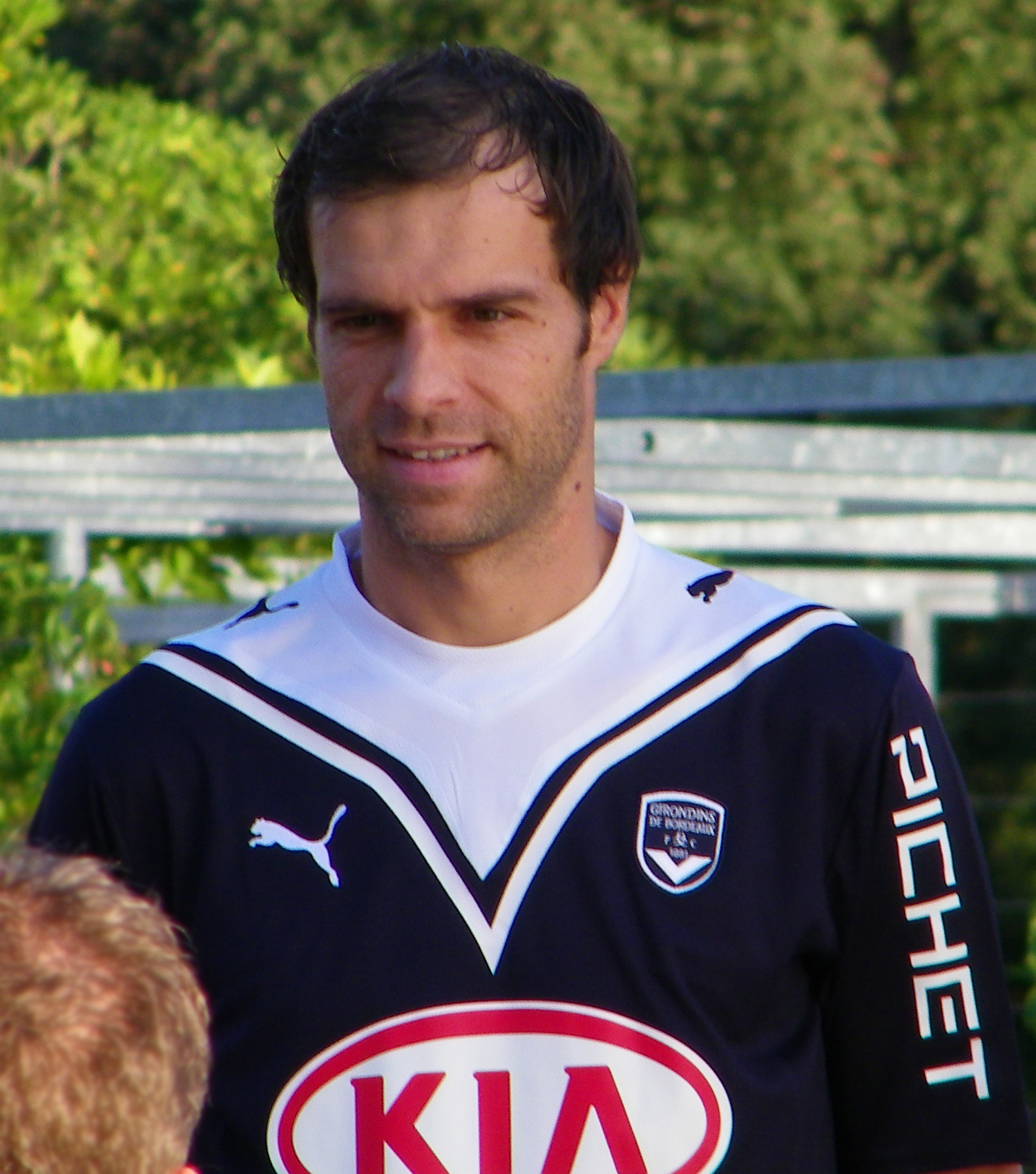
- Jurietti with Bordeaux

Personal information
- Full name: Franck Jurietti
- Date of birth: 30 March 1975 (age 51)
- Place of birth: Valence, Drôme, France
- Height: 1.77 m (5 ft 10 in)
- Position: Full-back

Youth career
- Lyon

Senior career*
Years	Team	Apps	(Gls)
1993–1994	Lyon	0	(0)
1994–1997	Gueugnon	110	(5)
1997–2000	Bastia	83	(9)
2000–2003	Monaco	36	(0)
2001–2002	→ Marseille (loan)	18	(0)
2003–2010	Bordeaux	172	(0)
Total		419	(14)

International career
1997	France U21	3	(0)
2005	France	1	(0)
- * Club domestic league appearances and goals

Franck Jurietti (born 30 March 1975) is a French former professional footballer who played as a full-back. He spent most of his career with Bordeaux.

== Club career ==
Jurietti's professional career started at Lyon, having already been part of their youth team. However, he did not get to play a single game and was transferred to Gueugnon at the end of the season. There he achieved promotion to Division 1 for his first year at the club, and on 19 July 1995, he played his first Ligue 1 match against Metz. At the end of the season, Gueugnon were again relegated, and, after one more year in Ligue 2 where they were unable to achieve back promotion, Jurietti left the club to SC Bastia, where he stayed for three years.

In 2000, he was transferred to Monaco where he was never quite able to settle and after 6 months, he was loaned for the rest of the season to rivals Marseille. He returned to Monaco for one more season and had a trial spell with Premier League side Everton in 2003 but did not secure a contract. He then joined Bordeaux, the club in which he has been the most successful so far, winning the championship once (after finishing twice runner-up) and the Coupe de la Ligue twice. He was the captain during the final against Vannes that Bordeaux won 4–0.

His contract expired in 2010, and he was notified by manager Laurent Blanc that it would not be renewed, effectively putting an end to his playing career.

== International career ==
In 2005, after an excellent start of season with Bordeaux, Jurietti was called up by Raymond Domenech for the France national team for the final two 2006 World Cup qualifying matches. After remaining an unused substitute against Switzerland, Jurietti made his international debut on 12 October 2005 during the 4–0 victory against Cyprus, but only came on for the last five seconds in what was to remain his sole international appearance. This makes him the French player with the shortest international career ever, ahead of Bernard Boissier, who had played two minutes for France in 1975.

== Style of play ==
Jurietti could play on both sides of the defence, and was also known to fill in as a midfielder when called upon. He developed a reputation for being one of the most "dangerous" players in the French league.

== Honours ==
Lyon

- Coupe Gambardella: 1993–94

Monaco

- Coupe de la Ligue: 2002–03

Bordeaux

- Ligue 1: 2008–09
- Coupe de la Ligue: 2006–07, 2008–09
- Trophée des Champions: 2008, 2009
