= Stéphane Odet =

French footballer (born 1976)

Personal information
- Date of birth: 26 November 1976 (age 49)
- Place of birth: Marseille, France
- Height: 1.70 m (5 ft 7 in)
- Position: Midfielder

Senior career*
| Years | Team | Apps | (Gls) |
| 1994–1998 | FC Martigues | 102 | (0) |
| 1998–2002 | Bastia | 26 | (0) |
| 2002–2004 | Beauvais | | |
| 2004–2006 | Marignane | | |
| 2006–2010 | Marseille Consolat | | |
- * Club domestic league appearances and goals

Stéphane Odet (born 26 November 1976) is a French former professional footballer who played as a midfielder.
