= Sébastien Pérez =

French footballer (born 1973)

Personal information
- Full name: Sébastien Pérez
- Date of birth: 24 November 1973 (age 52)
- Place of birth: Saint-Chamond, Loire, France
- Height: 1.78 m (5 ft 10 in)
- Position: Defender

Youth career
- Saint-Étienne

Senior career*
| Years | Team | Apps | (Gls) |
| 1993–1996 | Saint-Étienne | 55 | (2) |
| 1996–1998 | Bastia | 63 | (10) |
| 1998–1999 | Blackburn Rovers | 5 | (1) |
| 1998–1999 | → Bastia (loan) | 11 | (2) |
| 1999–2004 | Marseille | 73 | (3) |
| 2001–2002 | → Galatasaray (loan) | 18 | (3) |
| 2004–2006 | Istres | 21 | (0) |
| Total | | 246 | (21) |
- * Club domestic league appearances and goals

Sébastien Pérez (born 24 November 1973) is a French former professional footballer who played as a defender.

== Career ==
Pérez was born in Saint-Chamond, Loire. He began his career with AS Saint-Étienne and SC Bastia.

In July 1998 Pérez signed for Blackburn Rovers, managed by Roy Hodgson at the time, from Bastia for a fee of £3 million. His stay in East Lancashire was somewhat short, and he only made five appearances for Blackburn. He did, however, manage to score twice for the club; against Chelsea in the league (a game in which he was also sent off) and Lyon in the UEFA Cup. His career with Blackburn started well, but he suffered a serious injury, and upon return to the squad he struggled regaining his place back in the starting lineup. He was then loaned out to former side Bastia.

In June 1999 Pérez completed a move back to France, where he joined Marseille. He was loaned out to Galatasaray for the 2001–02 season, then returned to Marseille until the end of the 2003–04 season, when he was released. He joined FC Istres.

Pérez is also a member of the France national beach soccer team.

== Honours ==
Galatasaray

- Süper Lig: 2001–02

France Beach

- FIFA Beach Soccer World Cup: 2005
