= Patrick Moreau =

French footballer (born 1973)

Personal information
- Date of birth: 3 November 1973 (age 52)
- Place of birth: Cognac, France
- Height: 1.72 m (5 ft 8 in)
- Position: Defender

Senior career*
Years	Team	Apps	(Gls)
1990–1992	RCF Paris	?	(?)
1992–1996	Saint-Étienne	99	(3)
1996–2002	Bastia	101	(7)
2001–2002	→ Metz (loan)	21	(0)
2002–2005	Nancy	67	(2)
2005–2006	Châteauroux	11	(1)

International career
- France U-21
- * Club domestic league appearances and goals

Patrick Moreau (born 3 November 1973) is a French former professional footballer who played as a defender.
