= Frédéric Née =

French footballer (born 1975)

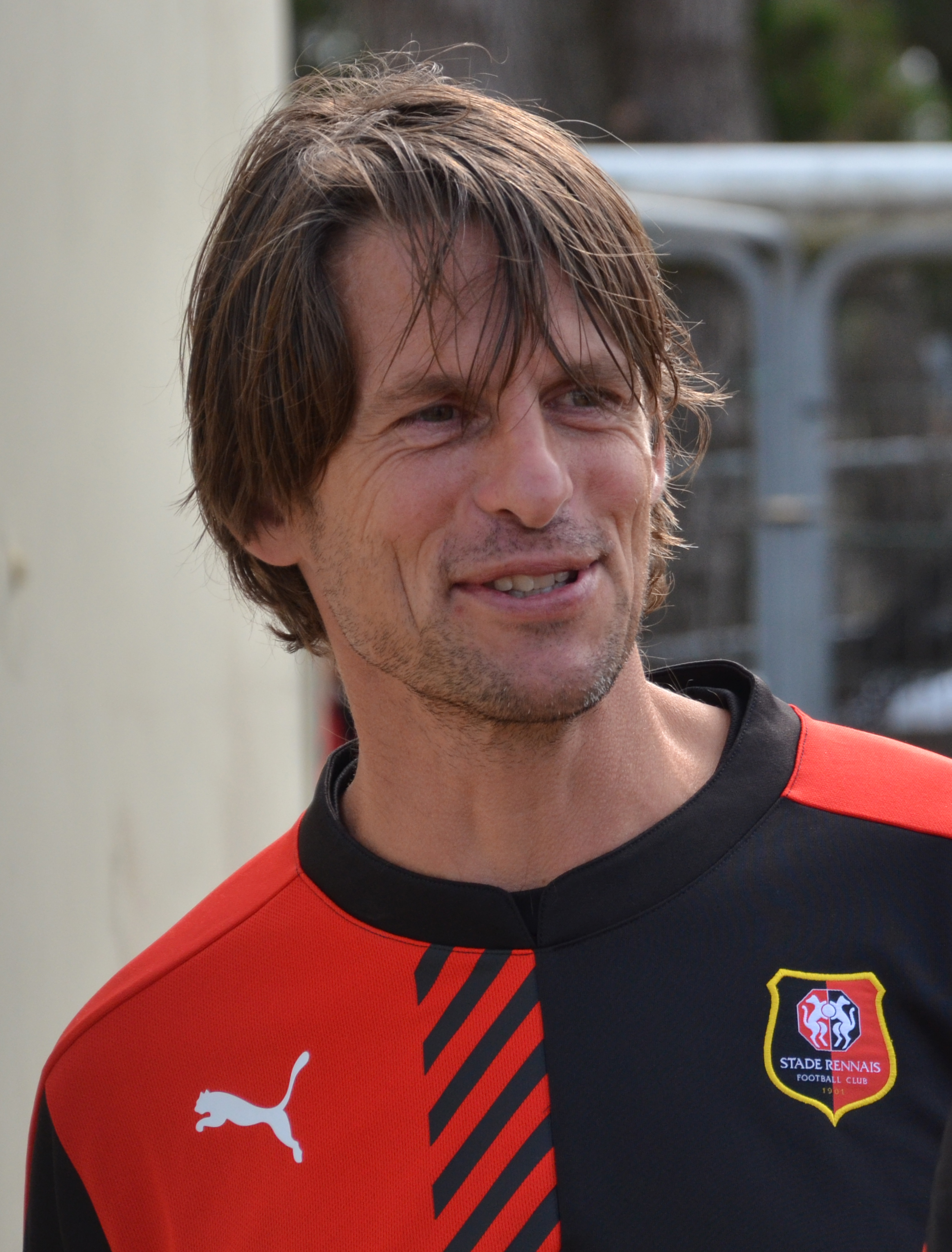
- Née with Rennes in 2015

Personal information
- Full name: Frédéric Michel Roger Née
- Date of birth: 18 April 1975 (age 51)
- Place of birth: Bayeux, Calvados, France
- Height: 1.83 m (6 ft 0 in)
- Position: Striker

Team information
- Current team: Bastia (assistant manager)

Youth career
- AS Bayeux

Senior career*
Years	Team	Apps	(Gls)
1996–1998	Caen	56	(22)
1998–2001	Bastia	90	(38)
2001–2003	Lyon	26	(3)
2003–2007	Bastia	92	(10)
Total		264	(73)

International career
1997	France U21	2	(0)
1999–2001	France A'	5	(1)
2001	France	1	(0)

Managerial career
- 2011–2012: Bastia B
- 2017–2018: ÉF Bastia
- 2019: Bastia (interim)
Medal record
Men's football
Representing France
FIFA Confederations Cup
Winner	2001
- * Club domestic league appearances and goals

Frédéric Michel Roger Née (pronounced [fʁedeʁik miʃɛl ʁɔʒe ne]; born 18 April 1975) is a French football manager and former professional player who played as a striker and is the assistant manager of SC Bastia.

His playing career was mostly linked to SC Bastia in two spells, in between which he represented Lyon and won Ligue 1 in both of his seasons.

== Playing career ==
Born in Bayeux, Calvados, Née began his career at Caen, the local club that he supported. He made his debut for the newly promoted Ligue 1 club in 1996–97, in which he had a three-month injury and they were instantly relegated. He turned down a move to Nantes to play one more season in Ligue 2, then took Bastia's offer over those of Lyon and Metz in the summer of 1998. In 2000–01, he scored 16 top-flight goals for the Corsicans.

Née was signed by Lyon in 2001 to replace Sonny Anderson, who in the end did not leave the Stade Gerland, and the further arrival of Peguy Luyindula limited his playing chances more. He was due to start a UEFA Champions League match away to FC Barcelona because of the former's injury, but the game was postponed due to the September 11 attacks, after which the Brazilian recovered and returned to the starting eleven. In January 2002, he suffered a knee injury in a reserve team match and was ruled out for six months.

He announced his retirement at the end of the 2006–07 season because of a recurrent injury.

Née was selected in the France national team's squad that won the 2001 FIFA Confederations Cup in South Korea and Japan. He earned his only senior cap on 1 June in a 1–0 loss to Australia, starting the game and having a goal ruled out for offside.

== Coaching career ==
After retiring, Née worked as a forwards coach for SC Bastia, Rennes and the French women's team, before being named manager of Étoile Filante Bastia in the fifth-tier Championnat National 3 in 2017.

In May 2018, Née returned to SC Bastia of the same division, as assistant to Stéphane Rossi. He was made interim manager of the Turchini on 23 October 2019 when the latter was dismissed from the club, now in Championnat National 2. Less than a week later, the position was filled by Mathieu Chabert.

== Career statistics ==
Appearances and goals by club, season and competition
Club	Season	League			Cup (Note: Includes Coupe de France and Coupe de la Ligue.)		Continental (Note: Includes UEFA Champions League, UEFA Cup and UEFA Intertoto-Cup.)		Total	
Club	Season	Division	Apps	Goals	Apps	Goals	Apps	Goals	Apps	Goals
Caen	1996–97	Division 1	22	9	5	2	–		27	11
Caen	1997–98	Division 2	34	13	3	0	–		37	13
Caen	Total		56	22	8	2	0	0	64	24
Bastia	1998–99	Division 1	27	11	2	0	5	3	34	14
Bastia	1999–00	Division 1	30	11	5	1	–		35	12
Bastia	2000–01	Division 1	33	16	2	1	1	0	36	17
Bastia	Total		90	38	9	2	6	3	105	43
Lyon	2001–02	Division 1	18	2	2	2	7	1	27	5
Lyon	2002–03	Ligue 1	8	1	1	0	2	0	11	1
Lyon	Total		26	3	3	2	9	1	38	6
Bastia	2003–04	Ligue 1	27	4	2	0	–		29	4
Bastia	2004–05	Ligue 1	26	3	2	0	–		28	3
Bastia	2005–06	Ligue 2	28	2	2	0	–		30	2
Bastia	2006–07	Ligue 2	11	1	1	0	–		12	1
Bastia	Total		92	10	7	0	0	0	99	10
Career total			264	73	27	6	15	4	306	83

== Honours ==
=== Player ===
Lyon

- Division/Ligue 1: 2001–02, 2002–03

France

- FIFA Confederations Cup: 2001
