= Frédéric Mendy (footballer, born 1973) =

French footballer

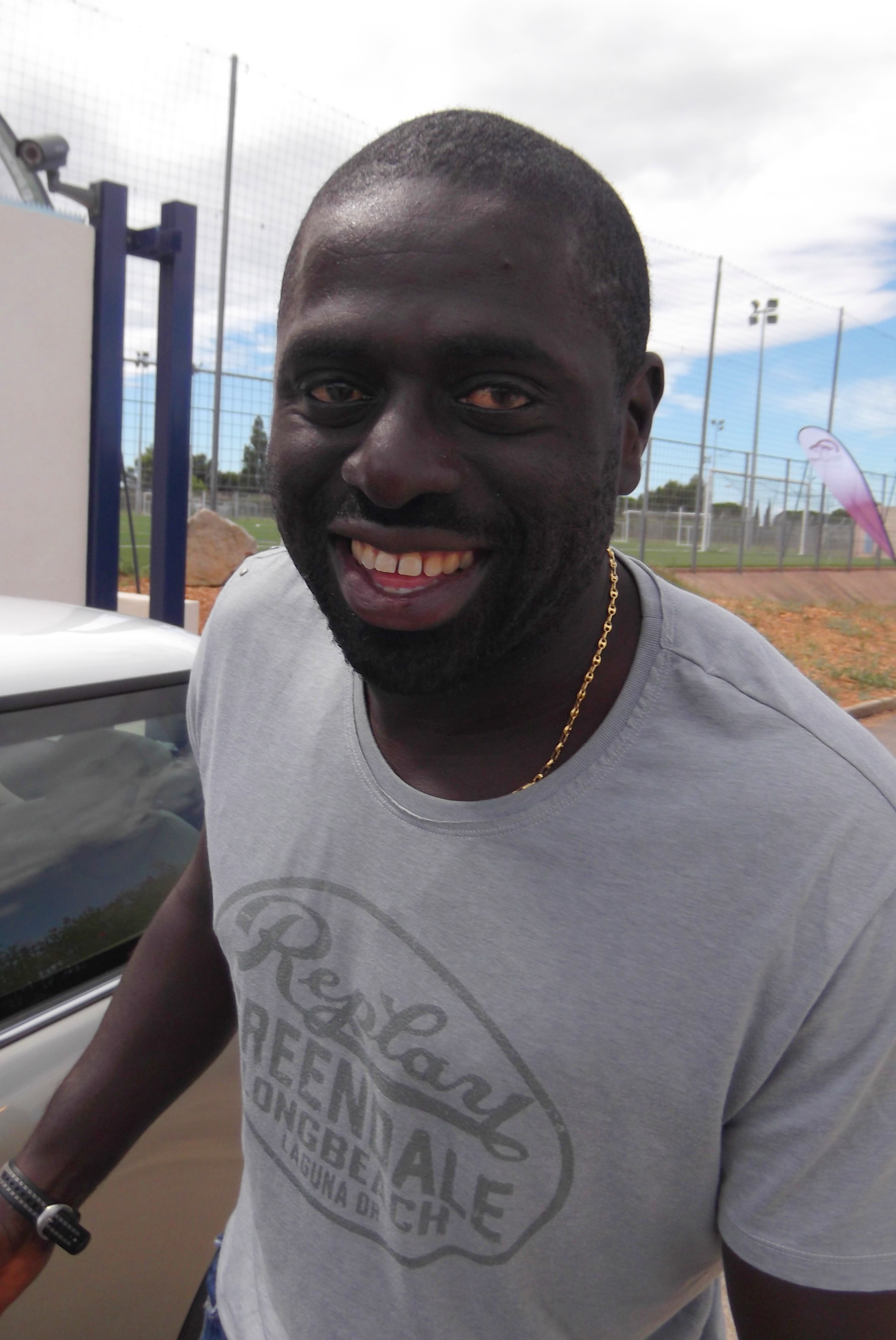
- Mendy in 2013

Personal information
- Date of birth: 29 November 1973 (age 52)
- Place of birth: Marseille, France
- Height: 1.79 m (5 ft 10 in)
- Position: Defender

Team information
- Current team: Montpellier Féminines (manager)

Senior career*
Years	Team	Apps	(Gls)
1993–1997	FC Martigues	94	(2)
1997–2004	Bastia	157	(2)
2004–2007	Montpellier	88	(3)
Total		339	(7)

Managerial career
- 2019–: Montpellier (women)
- * Club domestic league appearances and goals

Frédéric Mendy (born 29 November 1973) is a French former professional footballer who played as a defender. He played 339 matches in Ligue 1 and Ligue 2 for FC Martigues, SC Bastia and Montpellier HSC between 1993 and 2007.

== Managerial career ==
In 2019, Mendy was appointed manager of the Montpellier women's team.

== Personal life ==
Mendy was born in France, and is of Senegalese descent. When David Ginola collapsed during a charity football match in 2016, Mendy performed cardiopulmonary resuscitation (CPR), which cardiac surgeon Gilles Dreyfus claimed saved Ginola from death or at the least permanent brain damage.
