= Patrick Valéry =

French footballer (born 1969)

Personal information
- Full name: Patrick Jean-Claude Valéry
- Date of birth: 3 July 1969 (age 57)
- Place of birth: Brignoles, Var, France
- Height: 1.78 m (5 ft 10 in)
- Position: Right-back

Youth career
- 1983–1984: Monaco

Senior career*
Years	Team	Apps	(Gls)
1986–1987	Monaco B	3	(0)
1987–1995	Monaco	179	(0)
1995–1996	Toulouse	7	(0)
1996–1997	Bastia	30	(0)
1997–1998	Blackburn Rovers	15	(0)
1998–2001	Bastia	66	(0)
2001–2002	Aris FC	4	(0)
Total		304	(0)
- * Club domestic league appearances and goals

Patrick Jean-Claude Valéry (born 3 July 1969) is a French former professional footballer who played as a right-back.

== Career ==
Valéry spent the majority of his playing career playing for AS Monaco. He also had spells with Toulouse FC and SC Bastia (Note: Patrick Valéry – French league stats at LFP – also available in French (archived)) before joining Blackburn Rovers on a free transfer in June 1997. After an unsuccessful spell there he returned to France, re-joining Bastia in July 1998 for a fee of £80,000.

He retired in 2002.
