= Éric Poulat =

French football referee and computer scientist

Éric Poulat (born 8 September 1963 in Bron, Rhône) is a French retired football referee and computer scientist. Appointed as a referee on 1 January 1999, he made his international debut in a 2002 FIFA World Cup qualifier on 28 March 2001 between (Poland and Armenia). He went on to officiate at the 2004 Olympic Tournament, qualifying matches for UEFA Euro 2004 and the 2006 World Cup, and the 2006 World Cup itself.

Poulat retired as an international referee in 2006.
