= Pierre Laurent (footballer) =

French footballer (born 1970)

Personal information
- Date of birth: 13 December 1970 (age 55)
- Place of birth: Tulle, France
- Height: 1.74 m (5 ft 9 in)
- Position: Forward

Senior career*
Years	Team	Apps	(Gls)
1990–1994	ESA Brive	?	(?)
1994–1997	Bastia	73	(12)
1997–1998	Leeds United	4	(0)
1998–2001	Bastia	74	(10)
2001–2003	Strasbourg	21	(3)
Total		172	(25)
- * Club domestic league appearances and goals

Pierre Laurent (born 13 December 1970) is a former professional footballer who played as a forward.

== Club career ==
Born in Tulle, France, Laurent started his career at ESA Brive. He then spent three and a half years at Bastia before transferring to English Premiership Leeds United. He only made four appearances (two as a substitute) in one calendar year before returning to Bastia. After a short spell at Strasbourg which ended with him on the fringes of the first team, he retired in 2003.
