= Ousmane Soumah =

Guinean footballer (born 1976)

Personal information
- Date of birth: 6 October 1973 (age 53)
- Place of birth: Conakry, Guinea
- Height: 1.70 m (5 ft 7 in)
- Position: Striker

Senior career*
Years	Team	Apps	(Gls)
1992–2002	Bastia	43	(5)
1998–1999	→ Lorient (loan)	13	(2)
2002–2004	Al Wakrah		(12)
2005–2007	CA Bastia	20	(0)

International career
1994–2000	Guinea	10	(2)
- * Club domestic league appearances and goals

Ousmane Soumah (born 6 October 1973) is a Guinean former footballer who played as a striker.

== Early life ==
Soumah was born on 6 October 1973 in Conakry, Guinea.

== Career ==
Soumah started his career with French side Bastia. He helped the club win the 1997 UEFA Intertoto Cup. In 2002, he signed for Qatari side Al Wakrah. In 2005, he signed for French side CA Bastia.

== Style of play ==
Soumah mainly operated as a striker. He was known for his dribbling ability.
