= Morlaye Soumah =

Guinean footballer (born 1971)

Personal information
- Date of birth: 4 November 1971 (age 54)
- Place of birth: Conakry, Guinea
- Height: 1.75 m (5 ft 9 in)
- Position: Centre-back

Senior career*
Years	Team	Apps	(Gls)
1991–2003	Bastia	275	(2)
1993–1994	→ Valenciennes-Anzin (loan)	24	(0)
Total		299	(2)

International career
1988–2004	Guinea	69	(2)
- * Club domestic league appearances and goals

Morlaye Soumah (born 4 November 1971) is a Guinean former professional footballer who played as a centre-back.

Soumah spent most of his playing career with SC Bastia in France's Division 1. He acquired French nationality by naturalization on 19 August 1994.

He was part of the Guinea national team at the 2004 African Nations Cup, which finished second in its group in the first round of competition, before losing in the quarter finals to Mali.

After he retired from playing, Soumah was an assistant manager for the Guinea national team on several occasions.
