= Claude Colombo =

French professional football referee

- Born: 1 October 1960 (age 66)

Domestic
Years	League	Role

International
Years	League	Role

Claude Colombo (born 1 October 1960 in Nice, France) is a former French professional football referee. He refereed the 2000 Coupe de France Final.
