= Piotr Świerczewski =

Polish footballer (born 1972)

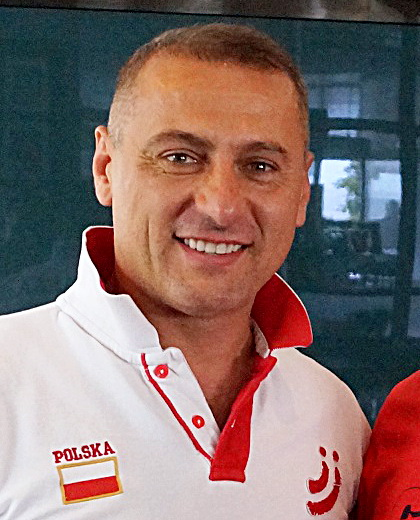
- Świerczewski in 2018

Personal information
- Full name: Piotr Jarosław Świerczewski
- Date of birth: 8 April 1972 (age 54)
- Place of birth: Nowy Sącz, Polish People’s Republic
- Height: 1.82 m (6 ft 0 in)
- Position: Midfielder

Youth career
- Sandecja Nowy Sącz
- Dunajec Nowy Sącz

Senior career*
Years	Team	Apps	(Gls)
1988–1993	GKS Katowice	101	(4)
1993–1995	Saint-Étienne	61	(2)
1995–2001	Bastia	179	(11)
1999	→ Gamba Osaka (loan)	16	(2)
2001–2003	Marseille	36	(1)
2003	Birmingham City	1	(0)
2003–2005	Lech Poznań	19	(0)
2005	Cracovia	0	(0)
2005–2006	Lech Poznań	39	(4)
2006–2007	Dyskobolia Grodzisk	26	(1)
2007–2008	Korona Kielce	9	(0)
2008	Dyskobolia Grodzisk	11	(1)
2008–2009	Polonia Warsaw	3	(0)
2009	ŁKS Łódź	8	(2)
2009–2010	Zagłębie Lubin	13	(0)
2010	ŁKS Łódź	14	(0)
2012	Tęcza 34 Płońsk	2	(0)
2014	Tarnovia Tarnowo Podgórne	4	(0)
Total		540	(28)

International career
- Poland Olympic
1992–2003	Poland	70	(1)

Managerial career
- 2011: Znicz Pruszków
- 2012: ŁKS Łódź
- 2012–2013: Motor Lublin
- 2020: Weszło Warsaw
- 2020: Sandecja Nowy Sącz (caretaker)
- 2021: Znicz Pruszków
Medal record
Representing Poland
Men's football
Olympic Games
Silver medal – second place	1992 Barcelona	Team
- * Club domestic league appearances and goals

Piotr Jarosław Świerczewski (Polish pronunciation: [ˈpjɔtr jaˈrɔswaf ɕfjɛrˈt͡ʂɛfskʲi]; born 8 April 1972) is a Polish former professional footballer who played as a midfielder. During his 20-year professional career, he played for clubs such as Lech Poznań, GKS Katowice, Polonia Warsaw, ŁKS Łódź, French clubs Saint-Étienne, Bastia and Marseille, Japanese side Gamba Osaka and England outfit Birmingham City, among others. His older brother Marek is also a former footballer.

== Club career ==
In 1993, Świerczewski signed for French side Saint-Étienne after trialing for 1. FC Nürnberg in Germany.

== International career ==
Świerczewski played for the Poland national team, winning 70 caps and scoring a goal. He was a participant at the 1992 Summer Olympics, where Poland won the silver medal, and at the 2002 FIFA World Cup.

== Personal life ==
Świerczewski is married to Lidia and now works for the Polish bus company Stalko.

His older brother Marek is also a former footballer and Poland international.

In 1993, he shared the cover of FIFA International Soccer with David Platt, in the first game in this videogame series.

He acquired French nationality by naturalization on 3 November 1998.

== Career statistics ==
=== Club ===
Appearances and goals by club, season and competition
Season	Club	League		
Season	Club	Division	Apps	Goals
GKS Katowice	1988–89	Ekstraklasa	1	0
GKS Katowice	1989–90	Ekstraklasa	15	1
GKS Katowice	1990–91	Ekstraklasa	28	0
GKS Katowice	1991–92	Ekstraklasa	30	2
GKS Katowice	1992–93	Ekstraklasa	27	1
GKS Katowice	Total		101	4
Saint-Étienne	1993–94	Division 1	31	1
Saint-Étienne	1994–95	Division 1	30	1
Saint-Étienne	Total		61	2
Bastia	1995–96	Division 1	35	1
Bastia	1996–97	Division 1	33	4
Bastia	1997–98	Division 1	31	2
Bastia	1998–99	Division 1	20	1
Bastia	Total		119	8
Gamba Osaka	1999	J.League Division 1	12	2
Bastia	1999–2000	Division 1	30	1
Bastia	2000–01	Division 1	32	3
Bastia	Total		62	4
Marseille	2001–02	Division 1	25	1
Marseille	2002–03	Ligue 1	11	0
Marseille	Total		36	1
Birmingham City	2002–03	Premier League	1	0
Lech Poznań	2003–04	Ekstraklasa	19	0
Lech Poznań	2004–05	Ekstraklasa	12	1
Lech Poznań	2005–06	Ekstraklasa	27	3
Lech Poznań	Total		58	4
Dyskobolia Grodzisk Wielkopolski	2006–07	Ekstraklasa	26	1
Korona Kielce	2007–08	Ekstraklasa	9	0
Dyskobolia Grodzisk Wielkopolski	2007–08	Ekstraklasa	11	1
Polonia Warsaw	2008–09	Ekstraklasa	3	0
ŁKS Łódź	2008–09	Ekstraklasa	8	2
Zagłębie Lubin	2009–10	Ekstraklasa	13	0
ŁKS Łódź	2009–10	I liga	14	0
Tarnovia Tarnowo Podgórne	2014–15	III liga	4	0
Career total			538	29

=== International ===
Appearances and goals by national team and year
National team	Year	Apps	Goals
Poland	1992	2	0
Poland	1993	10	1
Poland	1994	3	0
Poland	1995	8	0
Poland	1996	0	0
Poland	1997	7	0
Poland	1998	8	0
Poland	1999	6	0
Poland	2000	9	0
Poland	2001	9	0
Poland	2002	6	0
Poland	2003	2	0
Total		70	1

Scores and results list Poland's goal tally first, score column indicates score after Świerczewski goal.

International goal scored by Piotr Świerczewski
No.	Date	Venue	Opponent	Score	Result	Competition
1	31 March 1993	Górnik Zabrze Stadium, Zabrze, Poland	Lithuania	1–0	1–1	Friendly

== Managerial statistics ==
As of match played 12 June 2021

Managerial record by team and tenure
Team	From	To	Record							
Team	From	To	G	W	D	L	GF	GA	GD	Win %
Znicz Pruszków	12 April 2011	20 June 2011	11	4	6	1	16	9	+7	36.36
ŁKS Łódź	7 February 2012	31 May 2012	13	1	6	6	11	19	−8	7.69
Motor Lublin	12 September 2012	19 April 2013	14	4	5	5	21	23	−2	28.57
Weszło Warsaw	20 January 2020	30 June 2020	0	0	0	0	0	0	+0	—
Sandecja Nowy Sącz (caretaker)	6 July 2020	31 July 2020	4	2	1	1	3	2	+1	50.00
Znicz Pruszków	21 May 2021	30 June 2021	5	1	2	2	1	3	−2	20.00
Career total			47	12	20	15	52	56	−4	25.53

== Honours ==
GKS Katowice

- Polish Cup: 1990–91, 1992–93
- Polish Super Cup: 1991

Bastia

- UEFA Intertoto Cup: 1997

Lech Poznań

- Polish Cup: 2003–04
- Polish Super Cup: 2004

Dyskobolia Grodzisk Wielkopolski

- Polish Cup: 2006–07
- Ekstraklasa Cup: 2006–07, 2007–08

Poland Olympic

- Olympic silver medal: 1992
