= List of SC Bastia players =

This list includes SC Bastia players. Charles Orlanducci, with 429 matches, holds the record for most matches with the team. Claude Papi is the player with most goals, at 117 goals.

== List of players ==
As of 25 August 2012

== A ==
Player	Pos.	Bastia career	Match	Goal	Nationality
Boumedienne Abderrhamane	Defender	1956–1961			Algeria
Anthony Abou Deraa	Forward	2006–2008	3	0	France
Jules Accorsi	Midfielder	1959–1965			France
Ishmael Addo	Forward	2002	2	0	Ghana
Khaled Adénon	Defender	2009–2010	28	1	Benin
Dominique Agostini	Goalkeeper	2008-	15	0	France
Sauveur Agostini	Forward	1974–1978 and 1982–1983	14	0	France
Hassan Ahamada	Forward	2002–2003	14	3	France
Sauveur Aiello	Midfielder	1995–1997	4	0	France
Benjamin Ajiboye	Forward	1999–2002	2	0	France
Bruno Alicarte	Defender	1995–1996	20	0	France
Nicolas Alnoudji	Midfielder	2002–2003	12	0	Cameroon
Florent André	Midfielder	2011-	2	0	France
Pierre-Yves André	Forward	1997–2001 and 2004–2010	293	73	France
Toussaint Andrietti	Midfielder	1973–1975 and 1976–1979	2	0	France
Gael Angoula	Midfielder	2010-	30	0	France
Frédéric Antonetti	Midfielder	1982–1983 and 1987–1990	55	6	France
Baptiste Anziani	Defender	2009–2010	3	0	France
Hervé Anziani	Midfielder	1994–2000	28	0	France
Olivier Anziani	Midfielder	1989–1993	31	0	France
Denis Armbruster	Forward	1990–1991	20	2	France
Mauritius Arouh	Defender	1984–1986	5	0	France
Salim Arrache	Midfielder	2009–2010	13	0	Algeria
Fabien Audard	Goalkeeper	2001–2002	0	0	France
Guy Audran	Forward	1967–1968			France
Pierre Aussu	Midfielder	1976–1979	26	4	France

== B ==
Player	Pos.	Bastia career	Match	Goal	Nationality
André Baccarelli	Midfielder	1960–1967			France
Gérard Bacconier	Defender	1981–1983	69	0	France
Louardi Badjika	Defender	1981–1982	23	0	Algeria
Abdoulkarim Bangoura	Defender	1988–1993	2	0	Guinea
André Barthélémy	Forward	1978–1979	10	1	France
Serisay Barthélémy	Midfielder	2005–2011	111	15	France
Joseph Bastelica	Midfielder	1957–1964			France
Marc Bastiani	Midfielder	1961–1964			France
Laurent Batlles	Midfielder	2002–2004	38	4	France
Denis Bauda	Defender	1972–1973	38	2	France
Saïd Belarbi	Midfielder	1993–1994	2	0	France
Jacques Belmas	Forward	1964–1965			France
Samir Beloufa	Defender	2002–2003	1	0	Algeria
Patrick Beneforti	Midfielder	2001–2003	27	4	France
Chaouki Ben Saada	Midfielder	2002–2008	170	16	Tunisia
Rachid Ben Saïd	Midfielder	1981–1982	1	0	Morocco
Yamen Ben Zekri	Defender	2008–2009	21	0	Tunisia
Francis Berfini	Forward	1963–1964			France
Jean Bernacchi	Defender	1954–1964			France
Jean-Luc Bernard	Defender	1993–1995	36	0	France
Samir Bertin d'Avesnes	Midfielder	2003–2008	25	1	Comoros
Jacques Bertrand	Defender	1978–1980	0	0	France
Pascal Berenguer	Midfielder	1998–2001	1	0	France
Marc Biamonte	Forward	1981–1986	43	3	France
André Biancarelli	Goalkeeper	1991–1996	35	0	France
Pierre Bianconi	Defender	1982–1983, 1986–1987, 1988–1989 and 1990–1993	101	4	France
Patrick Bicchieray		1981–1982			France
Philippe Billy	Defender	2002–2003	4	0	France
Robert Blanc	Forward	1967–1969	40	13	France
Jean-Claude Blanchard	Forward	1968–1971	27	10	France
Joseph Bléziri	Midfielder	1968–1970	20	0	Ivory Coast
René Bocchi	Midfielder	1986–1987	24	2	France
Landry Bonnefoi	Goalkeeper	2012-	0	0	France
Sadek Boukhalfa	Forward	1965–1967			Algeria
Ali Boumnijel	Goalkeeper	1997–2003	15	0	Tunisia
Alain Bordin	Midfielder	1984–1985	5	0	France
Christian Borel	Forward	1977–1979	11	1	France
Carlos Borges	Forward	1987–1988	11	5	Uruguay
Zdravko Borovnica	Defender	1982–1983	38	2	Yugoslavia
Henri Borowski	Midfielder	1967–1969	6	0	France
Hamid Bourabaa	Forward	1991–1994	92	16	France
Christian Bracconi	Forward	1980–1983 and 1988–1991	63	7	France
Zahar Brahim	Forward	1965–1966			Morocco
Anthony Bral	Midfielder	2008–2009	2	0	France
Francis Brancaleoni		1966–1967			France
Damien Bridonneau	Defender	2006–2008	65	0	France
José Broissart	Midfielder	1973–1976	79	1	France
Robert Buigues	Midfielder	1971–1972	27	1	France
Félix Burdino	Midfielder	1973–1974	0	0	France
André Burkhard	Defender	1973–1980	216	2	France
Franck Burnier	Defender	1991–1995	138	5	France

== C ==
Player	Pos.	Bastia career	Match	Goal	Nationality
François Caffarel	Defender	1995–1997	5	0	France
Yannick Cahuzac	Midfielder	2005-	145	2	France
Jean-Charles Calendini	Midfielder	1994–1997			France
Georges Calmettes	Midfielder	1969–1974	119	6	France
Juan Calvet	Forward	1987–1988	11	2	France
Jean-Jean Camadini	Forward	1959–1971	45	7	France
Pascal Camadini	Midfielder	1992–1997 and 2005–2007	190	19	France
Hassoun Camara	Defender	2008–2010	39	4	France
Zoumana Camara	Defender	1999–2000	27	1	France
Jacky Canosi	Defender	1993–1995	49	0	France
Laurent Casanova	Defender	1989–1995 and 1997–2001	166	12	France
Patrick Casanova	Goalkeeper	1969–1971	4	0	France
Laurent Castro	Forward	1993–1994	32	8	France
Benoît Cauet	Midfielder	2003–2004	32	2	France
Jean-Louis Cazes	Defender	1975–1984	276	7	France
Gilbert Ceccarelli	Goalkeeper	1986–1989	98	0	France
Antoine Cervetti	Defender	1982–1987	79	0	France
Jean-Christophe Cesto	Defender	2007–2008	0	0	France
Michel Chaumeton	Forward	1972–1973	3	1	France
Jean-Pierre Chaussin	Midfielder	1986–1987	15	0	France
Abdelmalek Cherrad	Forward	2004–2007 and 2008–2009	44	9	Algeria
Ange Chessa	Defender				France
Jean Chiappe	Goalkeeper	1957–1968			France
Christian Chiari	Midfielder	1986–1987	1	0	France
Valerio Chiari	Forward	2001–2002	0	0	Italy
Pascal Chimbonda	Defender	2003–2005	67	4	France
Jérémy Choplin	Defender	2010-	34	3	France
François Ciccolini	Forward	1986–1988	18	4	France
Joseph Cinquini	Forward	1943–1963			France
Gilles Cioni	Defender	2005–2007 and 2010-	45	1	France
José Clayton	Defender	1998–2002	42	1	Tunisia
Teddy Conesa	Defender	2005–2007	0	0	France
Henoch Conombo	Forward	2004–2009	22	3	Burkina Faso
Alain Cornu	Midfielder	1953–1955 and 1965–1967			France
Gary Coulibaly	Midfielder	2004–2008	35	0	France
Kafoumba Coulibaly	Midfielder	2007–2008	21	0	Ivory Coast
Jacques Cristofari	Defender	1998–1999	1	0	France
Pasquin Cristofari	Midfielder	1963–1967			France
Patrick Cubaynes	Forward	1985–1986	18	4	France
Éric Cubilier	Defender	2009–2010	29	0	France
Dragan Cvetković	Midfielder	1984–1985	1	0	Yugoslavia

== D ==
Player	Pos.	Bastia career	Match	Goal	Nationality
Philippe Dalcin	Forward	1981–1982	0	0	France
François-Ange Dalcoletto	Forward	1959–1964			France
Issoumaila Dao	Defender	2008–2009	13	0	Ivory Coast
Samuel Darchy	Forward	1999–2001			France
Frédéric Darras	Defender	1994–1996	39	0	France
Pierre Deblock	Midfielder	2001–2002	13	1	France
Jean-Charles De Bono	Midfielder	1987–1991	106	2	France
Jean-Christophe Debu	Defender	1993–1995	42	0	France
Christophe Deguerville	Defender	1997–2002	86	0	France
Jacques Delannoy	Forward	1960–1964			France
Philippe Delaye	Midfielder	2003–2004	13	0	France
Ange Dellasantina	Defender	1955–1956			France
Michel Delucia	Forward	1992–1994	6	1	France
Joseph Desanti	Defender	1961–1965			France
Jean-Louis Desvignes	Midfielder	1976–1981	118	4	France
Éric Dewilder	Defender	1994–1995	19	1	France
Jean-Marie De Zerbi	Forward	1977–1983	86	9	France
Abdoulaye Diallo	Forward	1990–1992	55	10	Guinea
Sadio Diallo	Forward	2010–2012	67	18	Guinea
Antoine Di Fraya	Midfielder	1991–1993	62	18	France
Mounir Diane	Midfielder	2005–2006	22	1	Morocco
Alou Diarra	Midfielder	2003–2004	35	4	France
Nicolas Dieuze	Forward	2001–2003	33	2	France
Frédéric Dobraje	Goalkeeper	1978–1979	5	0	France
Milos Dobrijevic	Midfielder	1999–2000	0	0	Yugoslavia
Jean-Pierre Dogliani	Midfielder	1970–1972	53	18	France
Franco Dolci	Midfielder	2006–2007	8	0	Argentina
François Dominicci	Midfielder	1961–1964			France
Cyril Domoraud	Defender	2000–2001	21	1	Ivory Coast
Anto Drobnjak	Forward	1994–1997	99	50	Yugoslavia
David Ducourtioux	Defender	1998–2000	2	0	France
Claude Dumont	Midfielder	1963–1964			France
Darko Dunjić	Defender	2008–2011	43	0	Serbia
Éric Durand	Goalkeeper	1997–2001	128	0	France
Thierry Duvillie	Midfielder	1989–2000	4	0	France
Dragan Džajić	Forward	1975–1977	69	32	Yugoslavia

== E ==
Player	Pos.	Bastia career	Match	Goal	Nationality
Cyril Eboki-Poh	Forward	1999–2003	2	0	France
Yves Ehrlacher	Midfielder	1981–1982	24	3	France
Austin Ejide	Goalkeeper	2006–2009	44	0	Nigeria
Yassin El-Azzouzi	Forward	2010-	14	5	France
Aziz El Ouali	Midfielder	1993–1994	30	3	Morocco
Roland Erhardt	Defender	1967–1969	5	0	France
Michael Essien	Midfielder	2000–2003	65	11	Ghana
Paul-Hervé Essola	Midfielder	1999–2001 and 2002–2006	17	0	Cameroon
Jean-Jacques Etamé	Midfielder	1997–1998	18	1	Cameroon
Jean-Jacques Eydelie	Midfielder	1995–1997	54	1	France

== F ==
Player	Pos.	Bastia career	Match	Goal	Nationality
David Faderne	Forward	2000–2001	2	0	France
Pierre Falchetti					France
Paolo Farina	Defender	1958–1971	142	1	Italy
François Fassone	Forward	1961–1964			France
Mamadou Faye	Midfielder	1987–1998	208	8	Senegal
François Félix	Forward	1971–1973 and 1974–1978	187	79	France
Demetrius Ferreira	Defender	2000–2004	95	4	Brazil
Jean-Marie Ferri	Midfielder	1982–1983	0	0	France
René Ferrier	Midfielder	1965–1969	23	4	France
Bernard Ferrigno	Forward	1983–1985	46	6	France
Alain Fiard	Midfielder	1979–1984	148	13	France
Franck Fiawoo	Forward	1967–1968			Togo
Flavio	Forward	1994–1995	4	0	Brazil
Michel Fontana	Defender	1981–1982	4	0	France
Laurent Fournier	Defender	1998–1999	5	0	France
Georges Franceschetti	Midfielder	1968–1972 and 1974–1978	238	23	France
Jean Franceschetti	Defender	1959–1968			France
Jean-Nicolas Franceschi	Goalkeeper	2005–2007	0	0	France
Joseph Franceschini	Defender	1987–1988	2	0	France
Dominique Franchi	Goalkeeper	1991–1996	3	0	France
Yves Frangini	Defender	1995–1996	1	0	France
Joël Fréchet	Midfielder	1990–1991	31	3	France
Jamie Fullarton	Midfielder	1996–1997	16	0	Scotland
Michel Furic	Midfielder	1985–1986	35	2	France
Jean-Marc Furlan	Defender	1985–1986	33	1	France

== G ==
Player	Pos.	Bastia career	Match	Goal	Nationality
Christophe Gaffory	Forward	2007–2010	49	9	France
François Gandolfi	Defender	1962–1971	111	0	France
Alexandre Garcia	Forward	2009–2011	20	5	France
Pascual Garrido	Defender	1997–1998	4	0	Argentina
Ludovic Genest	Forward	2008–2009 and 2011-	56	7	France
Geninho	Forward	1970–1971	9	2	Brazil
Florent Ghisolfi	Midfielder	2004–2010	92	2	France
Gérard Gili	Goalkeeper	1973–1976 and 1980–1981	47	0	France
Didier Gilles	Defender	1986–1989	95	1	France
Jean-Pierre Giordani	Midfielder	1970–1975	136	19	France
Pierre Giudicelli	Midfielder	1973–1976	22	1	France
Pierre Giustiniani	Midfielder	1964–1966			France
Jules Goda	Goalkeeper	2008–2010	7	0	Cameroon
Wilfried Gohel	Forward	1996–1998	52	5	France
Yohan Gomez	Midfielder	2005–2010	123	5	France
Stéphane Gori	Defender	1987–1988	0	0	France
Philippe Gottardi	Forward	1985–1992	45	5	France
Jocelyn Gourvennec	Midfielder	2002–2004	60	3	France
Andrés Grande	Midfielder	1998–1999	1	0	Argentina
Christian Grazziani	Forward	1981–1982			France
Joseph Grazziani	Defender	1971–1978	25	0	France
Jean-François Grimaldi	Midfielder	2007–2009	1	0	France
Michel Guagnini	Midfielder	1955–1966			France
Thierry Gudimard	Forward	1980–1981	19	1	France
Adel Guemari	Defender	2002–2004	3	0	Algeria
André Guesdon	Defender	1976–1978	64	0	France
Hervé Guy	Forward	2002–2007	5	0	Ivory Coast

== H ==
Player	Pos.	Bastia career	Match	Goal	Nationality
Bernt Haas	Defender	2004–2006	17	1	Switzerland
Youssouf Hadji	Forward	2003–2005	62	13	Morocco
Féthi Harek	Defender	2007-	127	2	Algeria
Ferdinand Heidkamp	Defender	1973–1976	92	0	Germany
Joël Henry	Midfielder	1980–1981	24	5	France
Pierrick Hiard	Goalkeeper	1977–1983	161	0	France
Vitorino Hilton	Defender	2003–2004	14	0	Brazil
Jean-Louis Hodoul	Defender	1972–1973	32	0	France
Angelo Hugues	Goalkeeper	2003–2004	0	0	France

== I ==
Player	Pos.	Bastia career	Match	Goal	Nationality
Simei Ihily	Midfielder	1978–1985	218	29	France
Ilan	Forward	2012-	0	0	Brazil

== J ==
Player	Pos.	Bastia career	Match	Goal	Nationality
Daniel Jaccard	Goalkeeper	2006–2007	0	0	France
Kévin Jacmot	Midfielder	2003–2004	4	0	France
Thierry JGERamion	Goalkeeper	1985–1986	12	0	France
Florian Jarjat	Defender	2006–2007	15	0	France
Fabrice Jau	Midfielder	2001–2003, 2004–2006 and 2007–2010	165	22	France
Nenad Jestrović	Forward	1997–1998	19	2	Serbia
Cyril Jeunechamp	Midfielder	2001–2003	44	1	France
Price Jolibois	Defender	2002–2003 and 2005–2006	17	0	France
Sylvio Joseph	Forward	1989–1991	10	1	France
Jean-Claude Juillard	Defender	1963–1971	23	0	France
Franck Jurietti	Defender	1997–2000	84	9	France

== K ==
Player	Pos.	Bastia career	Match	Goal	Nationality
Sidi Kaba	Forward	1987–1988	0	0	Mali
Eugène Kabongo	Forward	1990–1992	26	15	Democratic Republic of the Congo
Foued Kahlaoui	Midfielder	2005–2007	3	1	Tunisia
Hervé Kambou	Midfielder	2008–2010	8	0	Ivory Coast
Kanyan	Forward	1975–1973	137	47	France
Christian Karembeu	Defender	2004–2005	7	0	France
Kassoul	Forward	1963–1964			France
Wahbi Khazri	Midfielder	2008-	78	10	Tunisia
Didier Knayer	Defender	1977–1979	8	0	France
Thomas Kokkinis	Goalkeeper	1990–1991	5	0	France
Ardian Kozniku	Forward	1997–1998	12	5	Croatia
Miloš Krasić	Forward	2013–2014	11	2	Serbia
Abdelkrim Merry Krimau	Forward	1974–1980	95	22	Morocco
Nebojša Krupniković	Midfielder	1998–1999	10	1	Yugoslavia
Bjørn Tore Kvarme	Defender	2004–2005	11	0	Norway

== L ==
Player	Pos.	Bastia career	Match	Goal	Nationality
Yann Lachuer	Midfielder	1999–2001	65	7	France
Félix Lacuesta	Midfielder	1977–1979, 1980–1981 and 1985–1986	95	7	France
Jean-Louis Lagadec	Defender	1965–1967			France
Régis Laguesse	Forward	1971–1972	8	2	France
Philippe Lalanne	Midfielder	1994–1995	2	0	France
Jean-Christophe Lamberti	Midfielder	2001–2002	1	0	France
Bernard Lambourde	Defender	2001–2003	23	0	France
Jean-François Larios	Midfielder	1977–1978	34	5	France
Lilian Laslandes	Forward	2002–2003	30	8	France
Pierre Laurent	Forward	1994–1997 and 1998–2001	147	22	France
Florent Laville	Defender	2005–2007	37	1	France
Jean-Louis Leca	Goalkeeper	2003–2008	34	0	France
Gilles Leclerc	Defender	1993–1995	42	4	France
Jacques Leglib	Goalkeeper	2001–2002	0	0	France
Serge Lenoir	Midfielder	1972–1976	143	29	France
Philippe Levenard	Midfielder	1983–1985	9	0	France
Alexandre Licata	Forward	2007–2008	26	4	France
Hassan Lingani	Defender	2009–2010	8	0	Ivory Coast
Vincent Liotta	Goalkeeper	1985–1986 and 1990–1992	10	0	France
Bruno Lippini	Midfielder	1986–1991	117	21	France
Benjamin Longue	Defender	2003–2005	2	0	New Caledonia
Grégory Lorenzi	Defender	2005–2008 and 2009–2010	95	5	France
Rémy Loret	Midfielder	1995–1996	25	1	France
Charles Luccheti	Midfielder	1964–1968			France
Jean-Louis Luccini	Defender	-1977	122	0	France
René Luccini	Forward	1934–1955			France
Jonathan Lacourt	Midfielder	2012			France

== M ==
Player	Pos.	Bastia career	Match	Goal	Nationality
Gauthier Mahoto	Midfielder	2009–2010	0	0	France
Arnaud Maire	Defender	2005–2009	102	2	France
Frédéric Maisetti	Midfielder	1985–1986			France
Yves Mangione	Forward	1991–1993	51	37	France
Damián Manso	Midfielder	2001–2002	22	1	Argentina
Toifilou Maoulida	Forward	2011-			France
Bernard Maraval	Defender	1994–1995	7	0	France
Sylvain Marchal	Defender	2012-	0	0	France
Paul Marchioni	Defender	1974–1981 and 1983–1989	286	3	France
Louis Marcialis	Forward	1978–1985	147	40	France
Eric Marester	Defender	2005–2007	66	1	France
Pascal Mariini	Forward	1980–1983 and 1988–1989	74	20	France
Nicolas Marin	Forward	2008–2009	16	2	France
Francis Marinetti	Midfielder	1969–1971	11	1	France
Yves Mariot	Forward	1977–1978	24	1	France
Pierre Maroselli	Defender	1986–1997	146	7	France
François Marque	Defender	2011-	11	1	France
Patrice Marquet	Midfielder	1988–1989	12	4	France
Johan Martial	Defender	2009–2010	29	0	France
Nicolas Martinetti	Defender	2008–2009	4	0	France
Maka Mary	Defender	2010-	22	0	France
Pascal Massemba	Midfielder	1982–1983	4	0	France
Franck Massoni	Goalkeeper	1993–1994	0	0	France
Alain Masudi	Midfielder	1997–1998	1	0	Democratic Republic of the Congo
Jonathan Matijas	Goalkeeper	2008–2009	1	0	France
Franck Matingou	Midfielder	1998–2006	91	0	Democratic Republic of the Congo
François Matteï	Midfielder	1963–1968			France
Jean-Pierre Matteï	Defender	1977–1978	2	0	France
Florian Mauritius	Forward	2002–2004	73	18	France
David Mazzoncini	Midfielder	1998–2001	22	0	France
Bryan M'bango	Defender	2008–2011	3	0	France
Grégoire M'bida	Midfielder	1982–1984	49	3	Cameroon
Steve M'bida	Forward	2009–2011	1	0	Cameroon
Rachid Mekhloufi	Midfielder	1968–1970	66	20	France / Algeria
Nassim Mendil	Midfielder	1998–2000	1	0	Algeria
Frédéric Mendy	Defender	1997–2004	158	5	France
Frédéric Mendy	Midfielder	2006–2009	90	9	Senegal
Mehdi Méniri	Defender	2007–2010	73	4	Algeria
Étienne Meschini	Defender	1993–1994	6	0	France
Christophe Meslin	Forward	2005–2007	40	16	France
Thierry Meyer	Forward	1984–1990	125	37	France
Boniface Miangue	Midfielder	1987–1988	3	0	Republic of the Congo
Stéphane Michel	Midfielder	1992–1994	23	1	France
Bruno Mignot	Midfielder	1978–1980	24	0	France
Roger Milla	Forward	1980–1984	108	36	Cameroon
Józef Młynarczyk	Goalkeeper	1984–1986	57	0	Poland
Anthony Modeste	Forward	2012-	0	0	France
François Modesto	Defender	1997–1999	16	0	France
Roger Moine	Goalkeeper	1968–1969	4	0	France
Alain Moizan	Midfielder	1984–1986	54	0	France
Salim Moizini	Midfielder	2008-	41	5	France
René Molteni	Midfielder	1969–1970	1	0	France
Joçelyn Monate	Forward	1992–1993	0	0	France
Laurent Moracchini	Midfielder	1985–1986 and 1988–1997	126	1	France
José Morales	Forward	1989–1990	35	20	France
Ľubomír Moravčík	Midfielder	1996–1998	33	8	Czech Republic / Slovakia
Patrick Moreau	Defender	1996–2001	101	7	France
Gérard Moresco	Forward	1964–1966			France
Victor Mosa	Defender	1970–1973	78	1	Germany
François Mosali	Forward	1989–1993	9	0	France
Éric Mura	Midfielder	1993–1994	12	2	France
Francis Muraccioli	Forward	1959–1960 and 1961–1966			France
Dominique Murati	Goalkeeper	1976–1987	11	0	France
Sony Mustivar	Midfielder	2008–2012	22	0	France

== N ==
Player	Pos.	Bastia career	Match	Goal	Nationality
Lilian Nalis	Midfielder	1999–2002	81	4	France
César Nativi	Defender	1978–1986 and 1988–1991	216	4	France
Frédéric Née	Forward	1998–2001 and 2003–2007	183	48	France
Victor Negroni	Forward	1956–1964			France
Ricardo Neumann	Midfielder	1974–1976	34	7	Argentina
Gaspard N'Gouete	Forward	1986–1987	31	21	Republic of the Congo
Guy-Roland Niangbo Nassa	Forward	2008–2011	39	2	Ivory Coast
Macedo Magno Novaes	Goalkeeper	2008-	98	0	Brazil
Victor Nuremberg	Forward	1963–1964			Luxembourg

== O ==
Player	Pos.	Bastia career	Match	Goal	Nationality
Stéphane Odet	Midfielder	1998–2002	26	0	France
Bartholomew Ogbeche	Forward	2003–2004	15	2	Nigeria
Pascal Olmeta	Goalkeeper	1981–1984	45	0	France
Charles Orlanducci	Defender	1969–1971 and 1972–1987	429	15	France
Paul Orsatti	Goalkeeper	1963–1970	62	0	France
Jean-André Ottaviani	Defender	1981–1986 and 1987–1991	139	2	France

== P ==
Player	Pos.	Bastia career	Match	Goal	Nationality
Jean-Jacques Padovani	Forward	-1969	3		France
Michel Padovani	Midfielder	1984–1989 and 1993–1995	102	3	France
Julian Palmieri	Midfielder	2005–2006 and 2012-	3	0	France
François Panizzi	Midfielder	1968–1970	4	1	France
Olivier Pantaloni	Midfielder	1988–1990	44	7	France
Ilja Pantelic	Goalkeeper	1971–1974	108	0	Yugoslavia
Arnaud Paoli	Goalkeeper	2000–2003	0	0	France
Claude Papi	Midfielder	1968–1982	389	117	France
Daniel Pasco	Goalkeeper	1979–1980	0	0	France
Jean-Marie Pasqualetti	Midfielder	1974–1975	0	0	France
José Pasqualetti	Midfielder	1975–1977	10	0	France
Paulo Alves	Forward	1998–1999	17	3	Portugal
José Pastinelli	Defender	1976–1986 and 1989–1990	166	1	France
Reynald Pedros	Midfielder	2001–2003	15	0	France
Nicolas Penneteau	Goalkeeper	1998–2005	181	0	France
Xavier Pentecôte	Forward	2007–2008 and 2009–2010	47	24	France
Sébastien Pérez	Defender	1996–1998 and Ja.1999–1999	75	12	France
Jacques-Désiré Périatambée	Midfielder	2009–2012	51	0	Mauritius
Dan Petersen	Forward	1999–2001	27	3	Denmark
Ognjen Petrović	Goalkeeper	1976–1978	43	0	Yugoslavia
Mariusz Piekarski	Midfielder	1998–1999	22	0	Poland
Louis Pierceschi	Forward	1968–1970	18	6	France
Jean-Claude Perfetti	Midfielder	1965–1968			France
Stéphane Pietronave	Midfielder	1988–1989	16	0	France
Ange Pinducci	Defender	1988–1993	13	0	France
Sébastien Piocelle	Midfielder	2000–2005	99	0	France
Fabien Piveteau	Goalkeeper	1996–1997	35	0	France
Charles Poggi	Defender	1989–1993	44	1	France
Raimondo Ponte	Midfielder	1981–1982	27	3	Switzerland
Danijel Popovic	Forward	2001–2002	1	0	Croatia
Daye Prince	Forward	1997–2003	85	12	Liberia
Michel Prost	Forward	1973–1976	42	9	France
Jean-Claude Putti-Matti	Midfielder	1987–1989	2	0	France

== R ==
Player	Pos.	Bastia career	Match	Goal	Nationality
Ljubiša Rajković	Defender	1979–1981	46	0	Yugoslavia
Zevan Rakić	Midfielder	1970–1971	20	3	Yugoslavia
Gilbert Ravanello	Defender	1972–1975	16	0	France
Johnny Rep	Forward	1977–1979	65	33	Netherlands
Wim Rijsbergen	Defender	1978–1980	48	0	Netherlands
Mathieu Robail	Midfielder	2010–2012	55	13	France
Jean-Jacques Rocchi	Midfielder	2008–2011	22	0	France
Romain Rocchi	Midfielder	2004–2005	24	1	France
Jean-Marc Rodolphe	Goalkeeper	1989–1990	24	0	France
Bruno Rodriguez	Forward	1993–1996	61	24	France
Cyril Rool	Defender	1993–1998	114	0	France
Guy Rossat	Goalkeeper	1970–1973	38	0	Germany
Patrick Rossi	Midfielder	1990–1991	1	0	France
Jérôme Rothen	Midfielder	2011-	32	4	France
Piotr Rzepka	Midfielder	1989–1992	79	24	Poland

== S ==
Player	Pos.	Bastia career	Match	Goal	Nationality
Toussaint Sabbatini	Defender	1984–1987	7	0	France
Stéphane Saillant	Midfielder	1993–1994	1	0	France
Gilles Salou	Defender	1990–1992	67	0	France
Amiran Sanaia	Defender	2011–2012	8	0	Georgia
Matthieu Sans	Defender	2010-	34	1	France
Etienne Sansonetti	Forward	1965–1967			France
Didier Santini	Defender	1989–1997	174	2	France
Daniel Santolalla	Midfielder	1950–1964			France
Santos	Forward	1986–1988	51	10	Democratic Republic of the Congo
Alain Santucci	Midfielder	1972–1976	9	1	France
David Sauget	Defender	2004–2006	44	2	France
Niša Saveljić	Defender	2003–2004	17	1	Yugoslavia
Cvetko Savković	Defender	1971–1973	57	0	Yugoslavia
Jean-Pierre Serra	Forward	1968–1971	100	39	France
Djibril Sidibé	Midfielder	2004–2005	32	2	Mali
Ermin Šiljak	Forward	1996–1998	27	8	Slovenia
Franck Silvestre	Defender	2002–2003	16	2	France
Pierre-François Sodini	Defender	2006–2012	3	0	France
Daniel Solas	Defender	1973–1975	47	0	France
Gérard Soler	Forward	1985–1986	23	6	France
Patrick Soler	Defender	1987–1988	18	1	France
Philippe Solomenko	Forward	1986–1988	36	3	France
Daniel Solsona	Midfielder	1983–1986	86	8	Spain
Alexandre Song	Defender	2004–2005	32	0	Cameroon
Patrice Sorbara	Defender	2005–2007	1	0	France
Lansanah Soumah	Midfielder	1997–1998	2	0	Guinea
Morlaye Soumah	Defender	1991–1993 and 1994–2004	275	2	Guinea
Ousmane Soumah	Forward	1992–1998 and 1999–2002	59	8	Guinea
Antoine Spinelli	Midfielder	1983–1990	26	0	France
Paul Squaglia	Defender	1983–1986	33	0	France
Augustin Straboni	Midfielder	1987–1989	5	0	France
André Strappe	Forward	1963–1965			France
David Suarez	Forward	2010–2012	67	29	France
Piotr Świerczewski	Midfielder	1995-De.1998 and 1999–2001	179	11	Poland
Idrissa Sylla	Forward	2010–2011	27	7	Guinea

== T ==
Player	Pos.	Bastia career	Match	Goal	Nationality
Thierry Taberner	Midfielder	1991–1993	36	3	France
Paul Tamburini	Goalkeeper	1954–1961			France
Alberto Tarantini	Defender	1983–1984	29	1	Argentina
Karl Tchikaya	Midfielder	1986–1988	7	1	France
Jonathan Téhoué	Forward	2003–2004	7	0	France
Lionel Tejedor	Midfielder	1969–1971	46	2	France
Jean-Roch Testa	Forward	1983–1986	30	7	France
Florian Thauvin	Midfielder	2011-	13	0	France
Albert Tho	Midfielder	1978–1980 and 1981–1983	12	1	France
Daniel Thoirain	Midfielder	1969–1971	40	1	France
Georges Tignard	Goalkeeper	1975–1976	0	0	France
Yvon Tomasi	Midfielder	1967–1968			France
Pierre Tomei	Defender	1956–1957			France
Jean-Claude Tosi	Defender	1968–1973	140	0	France
Robert Traba	Forward	1966–1967			France
Amara Traoré	Forward	1988–1990	55	22	Senegal
André Travetto	Defender	1973–1975	42	0	France
Smahi Triki	Defender	1986–1993	109	3	Morocco

== U ==
Player	Pos.	Bastia career	Match	Goal	Nationality
Cédric Uras	Defender	2001–2005	101	1	France

== V ==
Player	Pos.	Bastia career	Match	Goal	Nationality
Tony Vairelles	Forward	2001–2002 and 2004–2005	55	18	France
Bruno Valencony	Goalkeeper	1987–1996	180	0	France
Pierre Valentini	Forward	1957–1961 and 1962–1964			France
Jean-Marie Valeri	Forward	1965–1970	6	1	France
Patrick Valéry	Defender	1996–1997 and 1998–2001	96	0	France
Franck Vandecasteele	Forward	1994–1997	62	8	France
Greg Vanney	Defender	2001–2005	60	0	United States
Julien Vanni	Goalkeeper	2002–2006	0	0	France
Olivier Vannucci	Defender	2009-	2	0	France
Georges Ventura	Forward	1977–1978	1	0	France
Jacky Vergnes	Forward	1975–1975	46	20	France
Patrick Vernet	Midfielder	1981–1984	56	6	France
Marius Vescovali	Forward	1964–1969			France
Gérard Verstraete	Midfielder	1979–1980	32	3	France
Dominique Vesir	Midfielder	1977–1978	1	0	France
Joseph Viacara	Defender	1964–1971	37	0	France
Grégory Vignal	Defender	2002–2003	15	0	France
Florent Vigo	Midfielder	1990–1993	9	0	France
Christophe Vincent	Midfielder	2012-	5	0	France
Jean-Marc Vincenti	Defender	1959–1971	139	6	France
Jean-Claude Vittori	Forward	1965–1970	3	0	France
Slobodan Vucekovic	Forward	1979–1980	24	4	Yugoslavia

== W ==
Player	Pos.	Bastia career	Match	Goal	Nationality
Joseph Wamai	Forward	1978–1980	8	0	France
Laurent Weber	Goalkeeper	1996–1997	3	0	France
Marc Weller	Goalkeeper	1974–1979	78	0	France
William Andrade	Defender	1995–1996	21	1	Brazil

== X ==
Player	Pos.	Bastia career	Match	Goal	Nationality
Daniel Xavier	Defender	1986–1989	68	2	France

== Y ==
Player	Pos.	Bastia career	Match	Goal	Nationality
Anthar Yahia	Defender	2001–2005	78	2	Algeria
Sambou Yatabaré	Midfielder	2012-	0	0	Mali
Daniel Yeboah	Goalkeeper	2003–2005	0	0	Ivory Coast

== Z ==
Player	Pos.	Bastia career	Match	Goal	Nationality
Laurent Zamora	Defender	1986–1987	5	0	France
Yannick Zambernardi	Defender	1996–1997	0	0	France
Hubert Zénier	Midfielder	1966–1969	32	1	France
Stéphane Ziani	Midfielder	1994–1995 and 2004–2005	52	4	France
Jacques Zimako	Forward	1972–1977 and 1983–1985	196	53	France
Joseph Zuccarelli	Forward	1969–1970	0	0	France

Note: Note: The players in bold, is now playing Bastia.
