= FCO Strasbourg Koenigshoffen 06 =

Football club based in Strasbourg, France

Strasbourg Koenigshoffen
- Full name: Football Club Olympique Strasbourg Koenigshoffen 1906
- Short name: FCOSK 06
- Founded: 1906
- Stadium: Stade Charles Frey
- President: Mourad Oualit
- Head Coach: Amar Ferdjani
- League: National 3 Group I
- 2022–23: Régional 1 Grand Est, Group C, 1st (promoted)

Football Club Olympique Strasbourg Koenigshoffen 1906, known as FCO Strasbourg Koenigshoffen or FCOSK 06, is a football club based in the Koenigshoffen and Cronenbourg districts of Strasbourg, France. Founded in 1906, the club plays its home matches at the Stade Charles Frey. The club's colours are black and gold.

== History ==
The club was founded as Strasbourg Koenigshoffen, and took its current name in 2020 after a merger with Olympique Strasbourg.

FCOSK 06 played in Division 3 in the 1970s and 80s. The club has notably reached the round of 64 of the Coupe de France on several occasions. They reached the round of 32 of the Coupe de France after beating Clermont Foot on 7 January 2023. Didier Six coached Koenigshoffen from 1997 to 1998, and Pascal Malbeaux has served as the club's head coach and president.

The club were promoted back to Championnat National 3 for the first time in its current form in 2023, as champions of their Régional 1 group.

== Honours ==
FCO Strasbourg Koenigshoffen 06 honours
Honours	No.	Years
Division d'Honneur Alsace	2	1971–72, 1994–95
Coupe d'Alsace	2	1973–74, 1993–94
Division 4 Group C	1	1982–83
