= Giuseppe Montibeller =

Italian footballer (born 1964)

Personal information
- Date of birth: 22 August 1964 (age 62)
- Place of birth: Terlizzi, Italy
- Height: 1.77 m (5 ft 10 in)
- Position: Forward

Youth career
- INF Vichy

Senior career*
Years	Team	Apps	(Gls)
1984–1985	INF Vichy	22	(0)
1985–1988	Rouen	46	(12)
1988–1990	Abbeville	52	(8)
1990–1991	Saint-Lô	31	(13)
1991–1992	Quimper	28	(13)
1992–1993	Beauvais	0	(0)
1993–1994	Avranches	18	(4)
1994–1995	Angoulême	2	(0)
1995–1998	Charleville	15	(0)
1998	Saint-Dizier	6	(1)
Total		220	(51)
- * Club domestic league appearances and goals

Giuseppe Montibeller (born 22 August 1964) is an Italian former professional footballer who played as a forward. He played his entire career in France.
