= Bruno Valencony =

French footballer (born 1968)

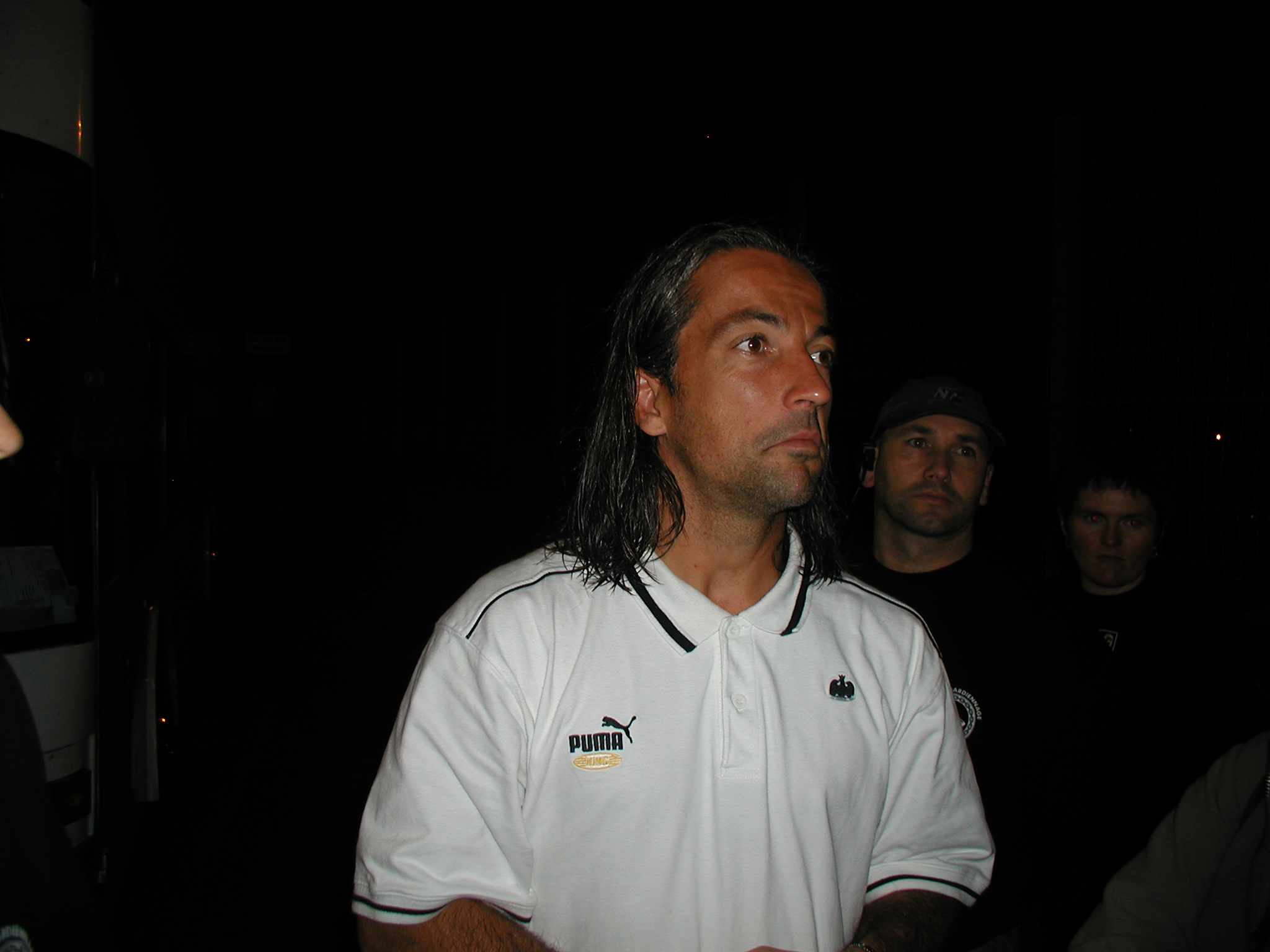
- Valencony in 2002

Personal information
- Date of birth: 16 June 1968 (age 58)
- Place of birth: Bellerive-sur-Allier, France
- Height: 1.80 m (5 ft 11 in)
- Position: Goalkeeper

Senior career*
Years	Team	Apps	(Gls)
1986–1987	INF Vichy		
1987–1996	Bastia	180	(0)
1996–2005	Nice	143	(0)
Total		323	(0)
- * Club domestic league appearances and goals

Bruno Valencony (born 16 June 1968) is a French former professional footballer who played as a goalkeeper.

== Career statistics ==
Appearances and goals by club, season and competition
Club	Season	League			National cup		League cup		Europe		Other		Total	
Club	Season	Division	Apps	Goals	Apps	Goals	Apps	Goals	Apps	Goals	Apps	Goals	Apps	Goals
Le Havre	1987–88	Division 2	0	0	0	0	—		—		—		0	0
Le Havre	1988–89	Division 2	0	0	0	0	—		—		—		0	0
Le Havre	1989–90	Division 2	10	0	0	0	—		—		—		10	0
Le Havre	1990–91	Division 2	27	0	1	0	—		—		—		28	0
Le Havre	1991–92	Division 2	3	0	2	0	—		—		—		5	0
Le Havre	1992–93	Division 2	27	0	0	0	—		—		—		5	0
Le Havre	1993–94	Division 2	42	0	2	0	—		—		—		44	0
Le Havre	1994–95	Division 1	37	0	2	0	4	0	—		—		43	0
Le Havre	1995–96	Division 1	34	0	1	0	0	0	—		—		35	0
Le Havre	Total		180	0	8	0	4	0	—		—		192	0
Nice	1996–97	Division 1	33	0	6	0	1	0	—		—		40	0
Nice	1997–98	Division 2	29	0	1	0	1	0	2	0	0	0	33	0
Nice	1998–99	Division 2	22	0	1	0	1	0	—		—		24	0
Nice	1999–2000	Division 2	10	0	0	0	0	0	—		—		10	0
Nice	2000–01	Division 2	29	0	0	0	1	0	—		—		30	0
Nice	2001–02	Division 2	19	0	2	0	1	0	—		—		22	0
Nice	2002–03	Ligue 1	0	0	1	0	0	0	—		—		1	0
Nice	2003–04	Ligue 1	0	0	0	0	1	0	0	0	—		1	0
Nice	2004–05	Ligue 1	1	0	1	0	1	0	0	0	—		3	0
Nice	Total		143	0	12	0	7	0	2	0	0	0	164	0
Career total			323	0	20	0	11	0	2	0	0	0	356	0

== Honours ==
Nice

- Coupe de France: 1997
