= Sence =

Sence may refer to:

== Places ==
- Sence, Mavrovo and Rostuša, North Macedonia
- River Sence, which flows through West Leicestershire
- River Sence, Wigston, which flows through Great Glen and Wigston near to Leicester

== People ==
- Philippe Sence (born 1962), French football goalkeeper
- René Sence (1920–1998), French competitive sailor

== See also ==
- Sense (disambiguation)
