= 1989–90 French Division 2 =

51st season of the second-tier football league in France

Division 2
- Season: 1989–90

Statistics of Division 2 in the 1989/1990 season.

== Overview ==
It was contested by 36 teams, and Nancy and Stade Rennais won the championship.

== League tables ==
=== Group A ===
Pos	Team	Pld	W	D	L	GF	GA	GD	Pts	Promotion or relegation
1	Nancy	34	21	8	5	62	24	+38	50	Promoted
2	RC Strasbourg	34	16	11	7	70	39	+31	43	
3	Nîmes Olympique	34	17	9	8	56	34	+22	43	
4	Olympique Alès	34	15	13	6	46	29	+17	43	
5	Martigues	34	13	14	7	38	33	+5	40	
6	Bastia	34	14	11	9	46	38	+8	39	
7	Stade Reims	34	13	9	12	37	32	+5	35	
8	Avignon	34	13	8	13	43	54	−11	34	
9	Istres	34	10	11	13	39	44	−5	31	
10	Dijon	34	11	9	14	34	45	−11	31	
11	Gueugnon	34	10	10	14	49	49	0	30	
12	Orléans	34	10	10	14	44	49	−5	30	
13	Cuiseaux Louhans	34	8	14	12	38	44	−6	30	
14	Annecy	34	9	12	13	31	43	−12	30	
15	Chaumont	34	10	9	15	36	52	−16	29	
16	Grenoble	34	8	12	14	35	46	−11	28	Relegated
17	Red Star Paris	34	9	10	15	27	47	−20	28	
18	Montceau	34	5	8	21	33	62	−29	18	Relegated

Source: rsssf.com

=== Group B ===
Pos	Team	Pld	W	D	L	GF	GA	GD	Pts	Promotion or relegation
1	Stade Rennais	34	18	8	8	39	27	+12	44	Promoted
2	Valenciennes	34	18	8	8	45	34	+11	44	
3	Rouen	34	16	9	9	46	29	+17	41	
4	Stade Lavallois	34	15	11	8	49	35	+14	41	
5	Le Havre	34	16	8	10	46	28	+18	40	
6	Beauvais	34	12	14	8	33	29	+4	38	
7	Chamois Niort	34	8	19	7	30	29	+1	35	
8	Lens	34	13	8	13	42	37	+5	34	
9	US Créteil	34	10	13	11	33	31	+2	33	
10	Angers	34	10	13	11	45	44	+1	33	
11	Dunkerque	34	9	15	10	28	36	−8	33	
12	St Seurin	34	12	7	15	44	43	+1	31	
13	En Avant Guingamp	34	9	13	12	32	38	−6	31	
14	Tours	34	11	8	15	46	46	0	30	
15	La Roche sur Yon	34	7	14	13	28	38	−10	28	
16	Lorient	34	9	9	16	32	52	−20	27	Relegated
17	Abbeville	34	9	9	16	27	47	−20	27	Relegated
18	Stade Quimpérois	34	4	14	16	21	43	−22	22	Relegated

Source: rsssf.com

== Championship play-offs ==
Team 1	Agg.	Team 2	1st leg	2nd leg
Rennes	0–2	Nancy	0–1	0–1

== Promotion play-offs ==
Quarter-final
2A	Strasbourg	2
3B	Rouen	0
2B	Valenciennes	3
3A	Nîmes	1

Semi-final
2A	Strasbourg	0	3	3
2B	Valenciennes	0	2	2

Final
2A	Strasbourg	3	0	3
18	Nice	1	6	7

== Top goalscorers ==
Rank	Player	Club (Grp)	Goals
1	(France) Didier Monczuk	Strasbourg (A)	26
2	(France) Alain Caveglia	Gueugnon (A)	24
3	(France) Jean-Pierre Orts	Rouen (B)	21
3	(France) Youri Djorkaeff	Strasbourg (A)	21
5	(France) José Morales	Bastia (A)	20
6	(France) Christophe Lagrange	Angers (B)	19
7	(Argentina) Jorge Domínguez	Tours (B)	18
7	(France) Patrick Cubaynes	Avignon (A)	18
7	(Scotland) Ray Stephen	Nancy (A)	18
10	(France) Roger Boli	Lens (B)	16
