= Jean-Luc Le Magueresse =

French footballer (born 1961)

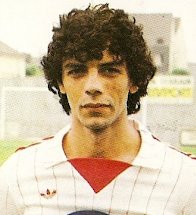
- Le Magueresse with Brest in 1984

Personal information
- Date of birth: 25 April 1961 (age 65)
- Place of birth: La Rochelle, France
- Height: 1.77 m (5 ft 10 in)
- Position: Defender

Youth career
- –1980: INF Vichy

Senior career*
Years	Team	Apps	(Gls)
1980–1986	Brest	116	(2)
1986–1988	Matra Racing (Note: In 1987, RC Paris was renamed to Matra Racing.)	28	(0)
1988–1989	Lens	21	(0)
1989–1991	Guingamp	35	(5)
Total		200	(7)
- * Club domestic league appearances and goals

Jean-Luc Le Magueresse (born 25 April 1961) is a French former professional footballer who played as a defender. In his career, he played for Brest, Matra Racing, Lens, and Guingamp.

== Early life ==
Jean-Luc Le Magueresse was born on 25 April 1961 in La Rochelle, Nouvelle-Aquitaine. His ancestors are originally from Pluméliau, Guénin, and Remungol, towns in the Brittany region of France. His surname in Breton, Ar Vagerez, means La Nourrice, translating to nanny.

== Career ==
Le Magueresse is a youth product of INF Vichy. He left the academy in 1980 to join Division 2 club Brest, where he would win the title and achieve promotion to the Division 1 in his first season. In 1986, he joined Division 1 club RC Paris (renamed Matra Racing in 1987). After two seasons in Paris, he joined fellow first-tier side Lens. However, after only one season in Lens during which the club was relegated, he returned to his native region of Brittany to play for Guingamp. Le Magueresse retired at the club in 1991. During his career, he made a total of 155 Division 1 appearances and 45 Division 2 appearances.

== Personal life ==
Le Magueresse had two daughters with Muriel Leroy, named Kay and Nolwenn. They divorced in 1993. Nolwenn, under the last name of her mother, became a prominent singer. Le Magueresse's relationship with Nolwenn has been described as "very complicated".

In the 2010s decade, Le Magueresse was a technical adviser for TV Breizh. In 2009, he began working in the commercial departments of his former club Brest.

== Honours ==
Brest

- Division 2: 1980–81
