= Issoumaïla =

Issoumaïla is a given name. Notable people with the name include:

- Issoumaïla Dao (born 1983), Ivorian footballer
- Issoumaila Lingane (born 1991), Burkinabé footballer
