= 1992–93 French Division 2 =

54th season of the second-tier football league in France

Division 2
- Season: 1992–93

The Division 2 season 1992/1993, organised by the LNF was won by FC Martigues and saw the promotions of FC Martigues, AS Cannes and Angers SCO, whereas 14 teams were relegated to Division 3, as for the 1993/94 season, the division would only have one group.

== 36 participating teams ==
Groupe A

- Gazélec Ajaccio
- Olympique Alès
- FC Annecy
- SC Bastia
- AS Cannes
- Olympique Charleville
- US Créteil
- CS Cuiseaux-Louhans
- SAS Épinal
- FC Istres
- FC Martigues
- FC Mulhouse
- AS Nancy
- OGC Nice
- FC Perpignan
- Rodez AF
- CS Sedan
- ASOA Valence

Groupe B

- Amiens SC
- RC Ancenis
- Angers SCO
- AS Beauvais Oise
- FC Bourges
- LB Châteauroux
- USL Dunkerque
- FC Gueugnon
- En Avant Guingamp
- Amicale des Écoles Publiques de Bourg-sous-la-Roche
- Stade Lavallois
- Le Mans UC72
- FC Lorient
- Chamois Niortais FC
- Red Star
- Stade Rennais
- FC Rouen
- Tours FC

== League tables ==
=== Group A ===
| Pos | Team | Pld | W | D | L | GF | GA | GD | Pts |
|---|---|---|---|---|---|---|---|---|---|
| 1 | FC Martigues | 34 | 19 | 9 | 6 | 53 | 24 | +29 | 47 |
| 2 | AS Cannes | 34 | 19 | 8 | 7 | 63 | 33 | +30 | 46 |
| 3 | OGC Nice | 34 | 14 | 13 | 7 | 49 | 32 | +17 | 41 |
| 4 | AS Nancy | 34 | 15 | 9 | 10 | 48 | 37 | +11 | 39 |
| 5 | ASOA Valence | 34 | 15 | 9 | 10 | 42 | 40 | +2 | 39 |
| 6 | CS Sedan | 34 | 13 | 12 | 9 | 46 | 31 | +15 | 38 |
| 7 | SC Bastia | 34 | 11 | 15 | 8 | 52 | 39 | +13 | 37 |
| 8 | FC Istres | 34 | 14 | 9 | 11 | 42 | 44 | −2 | 37 |
| 9 | Olympique Charleville | 34 | 14 | 9 | 11 | 36 | 38 | −2 | 37 |
| 10 | Olympique Alès | 34 | 14 | 8 | 12 | 42 | 44 | −2 | 36 |
| 11 | FC Mulhouse | 34 | 12 | 10 | 12 | 49 | 45 | +4 | 34 |
| 12 | CS Cuiseaux-Louhans | 34 | 10 | 9 | 15 | 35 | 42 | −7 | 29 |
| 13 | Gazélec Ajaccio | 34 | 11 | 6 | 17 | 43 | 55 | −12 | 28 |
| 14 | Rodez AF | 34 | 9 | 9 | 16 | 30 | 57 | −27 | 27 |
| 15 | FC Perpignan | 34 | 7 | 12 | 15 | 31 | 44 | −13 | 26 |
| 16 | SAS Épinal | 34 | 8 | 8 | 18 | 35 | 55 | −20 | 24 |
| 17 | FC Annecy | 34 | 8 | 8 | 18 | 28 | 55 | −27 | 24 |
| 18 | US Créteil | 33 | 7 | 9 | 17 | 42 | 51 | −9 | 23 |

=== Group B ===
| Pos | Team | Pld | W | D | L | GF | GA | GD | Pts |
|---|---|---|---|---|---|---|---|---|---|
| 1 | Angers SCO | 34 | 20 | 8 | 6 | 47 | 22 | +25 | 48 |
| 2 | Stade Rennais | 34 | 19 | 8 | 7 | 63 | 33 | +30 | 46 |
| 3 | FC Rouen | 34 | 18 | 9 | 7 | 50 | 31 | +19 | 45 |
| 4 | Red Star | 34 | 17 | 8 | 9 | 46 | 29 | +17 | 42 |
| 5 | Le Mans UC72 | 34 | 15 | 11 | 8 | 44 | 33 | +11 | 41 |
| 6 | USL Dunkerque | 34 | 12 | 16 | 6 | 39 | 31 | +8 | 40 |
| 7 | FC Bourges | 34 | 11 | 17 | 6 | 49 | 37 | +12 | 39 |
| 8 | AS Beauvais Oise | 34 | 12 | 15 | 7 | 31 | 21 | +10 | 39 |
| 9 | Stade Lavallois | 34 | 11 | 15 | 8 | 43 | 33 | +10 | 37 |
| 10 | Chamois Niortais FC | 34 | 13 | 11 | 10 | 30 | 24 | +6 | 37 |
| 11 | FC Gueugnon | 34 | 12 | 9 | 13 | 37 | 34 | +3 | 33 |
| 12 | Amiens SC | 34 | 11 | 10 | 13 | 32 | 41 | −9 | 32 |
| 13 | En Avant Guingamp | 34 | 10 | 9 | 15 | 40 | 49 | −9 | 29 |
| 14 | LB Châteauroux | 34 | 9 | 9 | 16 | 39 | 49 | −10 | 27 |
| 15 | Tours FC | 34 | 8 | 9 | 17 | 33 | 60 | −27 | 25 |
| 16 | AEP Bourg-sous-la-Roche | 34 | 3 | 14 | 17 | 28 | 49 | −21 | 20 |
| 17 | RC Ancenis | 34 | 4 | 10 | 20 | 26 | 59 | −33 | 18 |
| 18 | FC Lorient | 34 | 3 | 9 | 22 | 29 | 63 | −34 | 15 |

== Championship play-offs ==
| Team 1 | Agg. | Team 2 | 1st leg | 2nd leg |
|---|---|---|---|---|
| Martigues | 5–4 | Angers | 1–1 | 4–3 |

== Promotion play-offs ==
Quarter-final
2B | Rennes (a.e.t.) | 1
3A | Nice | 0
2A | Cannes | 1
3B | Rouen | 0

Semi-final
2B | Rennes | 0 | 0 | 0
2A | Cannes | 1 | 3 | 4

Final
18 | Valenciennes | 1 | 1 | 1
2A | Cannes | 2 | 1 | 3

== Top goalscorers ==
| Rank | Player | Club (Grp) | Goals |
|---|---|---|---|
| 1 | (France) Franck Priou | Cannes (A) | 21 |
| 2 | (France) Yves Mangione | Bastia (A) | 20 |
| 3 | (France) Yannick Stopyra | Mulhouse (A) | 18 |
| 3 | (France) Jean-Pierre Orts | Rouen (B) | 18 |
| 5 | (France) Mickaël Madar | Cannes (A) | 17 |
| 5 | (France) Réginald Ray | Istres (A) | 17 |
| 5 | (Croatia) Zlatko Vujović | Nice (A) | 17 |
| 5 | (France) Christophe Lagrange | Angers (B) | 17 |
| 5 | (France) Jean-Luc Courtet | Bourges (B) | 17 |
| 5 | (France) Samuel Michel | Red Star (B) | 17 |

== External links and references ==
- RSSSF archives of results

Thibert, Jacques (1993). L'album 93 du football. Scaneditons. ISBN 2-209-06811-8.
