= Dehon =

Dehon can be both a surname and a middle name. Notable people with this name include:

== As a middle name ==
- Arthur Dehon Little (1863–1935), American chemist and chemical engineer

== As a surname ==
- Jean-Philippe Dehon (born 1956), French football player
- Léon Dehon (1843–1925), French Catholic priest
- Nicolas Dehon (born 1968), French football player
- Theodore Dehon (1776–1817), American bishop
