= Banide =

Banide is a surname. Notable people with the surname include:

- Gérard Banide (born 1936), French football coach
- Laurent Banide (born 1968), French football manager
- Maurice Banide (1905–1995), French football player and manager
