= Patrice Loiseau =

French footballer (born 1959)

Personal information
- Date of birth: 10 May 1959 (age 67)
- Place of birth: Perpignan, France
- Height: 1.82 m (6 ft 0 in)
- Position: Centre-back

Youth career
- INF Vichy

Senior career*
Years	Team	Apps	(Gls)
1977–1979	INF Vichy		
1979–1980	Metz	21	(1)
1980–1981	Auxerre	5	(0)
1981–1983	Metz	30	(4)
1983–1988	Tours	112	(25)
Total		168+	(30+)
- * Club domestic league appearances and goals

Patrice Loiseau (born 10 May 1959) is a French former professional footballer who played as a centre-back. In his career, he played for INF Vichy, Metz, Auxerre, and Tours. He scored eight goals in 81 Division 1 appearances.

== Honours ==
INF Vichy

- Division 3: 1978–79
- Coupe Gambardella: 1977–78

Tours

- Division 2: 1983–84
