= Victor da Silva =

Victor da Silva (or Victor Da Silva) is a name. People with that name include:

- Victor Da Silva (footballer, born 1962), Portuguese football midfielder
- Victor da Silva (footballer, born 1976), Brazilian football midfielder
- Victor da Silva (footballer, born 1995), Brazilian football attacking midfielder

== See also ==
- Vitinho (footballer, born 1989), full name Victor da Silva Medeiros, known as Vitinho, Brazilian football striker
