= 1988–89 French Division 2 =

50th season of the second-tier football league in France

Division 2
- Season: 1988–89

Statistics of Division 2 in the 1988/1989 season.

== Overview ==
It was contested by 36 teams, and Mulhouse and Olympique Lyonnais won the championship.

== League tables ==
=== Group A ===
| Pos | Team | Pld | W | D | L | GF | GA | GD | Pts | Promotion or relegation |
|---|---|---|---|---|---|---|---|---|---|---|
| 1 | Mulhouse | 34 | 24 | 4 | 6 | 66 | 28 | +38 | 76 | Promoted |
| 2 | Brest | 34 | 22 | 9 | 3 | 62 | 24 | +38 | 75 | Promoted |
| 3 | Stade Rennais | 34 | 19 | 8 | 7 | 61 | 28 | +33 | 65 | |
| 4 | Stade Quimpérois | 34 | 19 | 8 | 7 | 55 | 29 | +26 | 65 | |
| 5 | Nancy | 34 | 18 | 5 | 11 | 52 | 36 | +16 | 59 | |
| 6 | En Avant Guingamp | 34 | 11 | 12 | 11 | 51 | 52 | −1 | 45 | |
| 7 | Valenciennes | 34 | 12 | 8 | 14 | 38 | 39 | −1 | 44 | |
| 8 | Dunkerque | 34 | 11 | 11 | 12 | 28 | 40 | −12 | 44 | |
| 9 | Stade Reims | 34 | 11 | 10 | 13 | 39 | 37 | +2 | 43 | |
| 10 | Créteil-Lusitanos | 34 | 10 | 11 | 13 | 29 | 39 | −10 | 41 | |
| 11 | Rouen | 34 | 9 | 13 | 12 | 31 | 35 | −4 | 40 | |
| 12 | Angers | 34 | 8 | 15 | 11 | 44 | 43 | +1 | 39 | |
| 13 | Abbeville | 34 | 10 | 9 | 15 | 39 | 54 | −15 | 39 | |
| 14 | Gueugnon | 34 | 10 | 8 | 16 | 30 | 43 | −13 | 38 | |
| 15 | Beauvais | 34 | 10 | 8 | 16 | 29 | 42 | −13 | 38 | |
| 16 | La Roche sur Yon | 34 | 9 | 9 | 16 | 26 | 32 | −6 | 36 | |
| 17 | Le Touquet | 34 | 5 | 9 | 20 | 20 | 57 | −37 | 24 | Relegated |
| 18 | Le Mans | 34 | 5 | 9 | 20 | 27 | 69 | −42 | 24 | Relegated |

Source: rsssf.com

=== Group B ===
| Pos | Team | Pld | W | D | L | GF | GA | GD | Pts | Promotion or relegation |
|---|---|---|---|---|---|---|---|---|---|---|
| 1 | Olympique Lyonnais | 34 | 19 | 11 | 4 | 66 | 22 | +44 | 68 | Promoted |
| 2 | Nîmes Olympique | 34 | 20 | 6 | 8 | 53 | 30 | +23 | 66 | |
| 3 | Le Havre | 34 | 18 | 11 | 5 | 48 | 21 | +27 | 65 | |
| 4 | Martigues | 34 | 17 | 7 | 10 | 40 | 30 | +10 | 58 | |
| 5 | Bastia | 34 | 14 | 9 | 11 | 46 | 44 | +2 | 51 | |
| 6 | Dijon | 34 | 14 | 7 | 13 | 38 | 40 | −2 | 49 | |
| 7 | Cuiseaux Louhans | 34 | 12 | 11 | 11 | 34 | 40 | −6 | 47 | |
| 8 | Olympique Alès | 34 | 10 | 16 | 8 | 33 | 31 | +2 | 46 | |
| 9 | Montceau | 34 | 10 | 13 | 11 | 41 | 40 | +1 | 43 | |
| 10 | Orléans | 34 | 11 | 10 | 13 | 53 | 60 | −7 | 43 | |
| 11 | Grenoble | 34 | 11 | 9 | 14 | 33 | 39 | −6 | 42 | |
| 12 | Annecy | 34 | 12 | 6 | 16 | 36 | 47 | −11 | 42 | |
| 13 | Istres | 34 | 8 | 15 | 11 | 30 | 35 | −5 | 39 | |
| 14 | Chamois Niort | 34 | 7 | 17 | 10 | 28 | 31 | −3 | 38 | |
| 15 | Sète | 34 | 10 | 8 | 16 | 35 | 41 | −6 | 38 | Relegated |
| 16 | Rodez | 34 | 7 | 12 | 15 | 34 | 48 | −14 | 33 | Relegated |
| 17 | Clermont | 34 | 7 | 10 | 17 | 27 | 51 | −24 | 31 | Relegated |
| 18 | Le Puy | 34 | 5 | 10 | 19 | 29 | 54 | −25 | 25 | Relegated |

Source: rsssf.com

== Championship play-offs ==
| Team 1 | Agg. | Team 2 | 1st leg | 2nd leg |
|---|---|---|---|---|
| Lyon | 4–2 | Mulhouse | 2–1 | 2–1 |

== Promotion play-offs ==
Quarter-final
2A | Brest | 4
3B | Le Havre | 1
2B | Nîmes | 1
3A | Rennes | 0

Semi-final
2A | Brest | 3 | 0 | 3
2B | Nîmes | 0 | 1 | 1

Final
18 | Strasbourg | 2 | 0 | 2
2A | Brest | 2 | 1 | 3

== Top goalscorers ==
| Rank | Player | Club (Grp) | Goals |
|---|---|---|---|
| 1 | (France) Robby Langers | Orléans (B) | 28 |
| 2 | (Zaire) Eugène Kabongo | Lyon (B) | 22 |
| 3 | (Paraguay) Roberto Cabañas | Brest (A) | 21 |
| 3 | (France) Franck Priou | Mulhouse (A) | 21 |
| 5 | (Netherlands) Erik-Jan van den Boogaard | Rennes (A) | 20 |
| 5 | (France) David Zitelli | Nancy (A) | 20 |
| 7 | (Socialist Federal Republic of Yugoslavia) Dragiša Binić | Brest (B) | 18 |
| 8 | (France) Sylver Hoffer | Louhans-Cuiseaux (B) | 16 |
| 8 | (Argentina) Jorge Domínguez | Nîmes (B) | 16 |
| 8 | (France) Fabrice Picot | Quimper (A) | 16 |
