= Pascal Malbeaux =

French footballer (1961–2012)

Personal information
- Full name: Pascal René Malbeaux
- Date of birth: 16 July 1961
- Place of birth: Brest, France
- Date of death: 8 June 2012 (aged 50)
- Place of death: Strasbourg, France
- Height: 1.77 m (5 ft 10 in)
- Position: Defensive midfielder

Youth career
- INF Vichy

Senior career*
Years	Team	Apps	(Gls)
1980–1981	INF Vichy		
1981–1985	Rouen	119	(14)
1985–1986	Bordeaux	21	(0)
1986–1988	Alès	66	(5)
1988–1990	Le Havre	49	(0)
1990–1993	Valenciennes	63	(1)
1993–1994	AS Strasbourg		
Total		318+	(20+)

Managerial career
- Strasbourg Koenigshoffen
- * Club domestic league appearances and goals

Pascal René Malbeaux (16 July 1961 – 8 June 2012) was a French professional footballer who played as a defensive midfielder. In his career, he played for INF Vichy, Rouen, Bordeaux, Alès, Le Havre, Valenciennes, and AS Strasbourg. He made 104 appearances and scored three goals in the Division 1.

== Post-playing career ==
Malbeaux retired from football in 1994. He would go on to become the manager of Strasbourg Koenigshoffen before becoming the club's president.

On 8 June 2012, Malbeaux died due to cancer.

== Honours ==
INF Vichy

- Coupe Gambardella: 1979–80

Rouen

- Division 2: 1981–82 Group B

Bordeaux

- Coupe de France: 1985–86

Valenciennes

- Division 2: 1991–92 Group A
