= Jorge Domínguez =

Jorge Domínguez may refer to:

- Jorge Domínguez (1959–2023), Argentine football striker
- Jorge I. Domínguez (born 1945), Cuban-born Harvard academic
- Jorge Domínguez (politician) (born 1945), Argentine politician, mayor of Buenos Aires and Minister of Defense
- Jorge Domínguez, Mexican musician, composer of music for telenovelas including La vecina
- Jorge Domínguez (footballer, born 2009), Spanish football defender for Atlético Madrid B
