= Michel Sanchez =

Michel Sanchez is a name. People with that name include:

- Michel Sanchez (born 1967), French footballer
- Michel Sanchez (born 1957), French musician
