= Jean-Michel Raymond =

French footballer (born 1959)

Personal information
- Date of birth: 24 August 1959 (age 67)
- Place of birth: Koléa, French Algeria
- Height: 1.80 m (5 ft 11 in)
- Position: Goalkeeper

Youth career
- INF Vichy

Senior career*
Years	Team	Apps	(Gls)
1979–1980	INF Vichy		
1980–1982	Toulouse	13	(0)
1982–1985	Lyon	17	(0)
1985–1988	Muret		
- * Club domestic league appearances and goals

Jean-Michel Raymond (born 24 August 1959) is a French former professional footballer who played as a goalkeeper. In his career, he played for INF Vichy, Toulouse, Lyon, and Muret.

== Honours ==
Toulouse

- Division 2: 1981–82
