= INF Vichy =

Football academy in Vichy, France

- Full name: Institut National du Football de Vichy
- Founded: 1972
- Dissolved: 1988
- League: French Division 3

The Institut National du Football de Vichy, more commonly known as INF Vichy, was a football academy based in Vichy, France. Founded in 1972 by the French Football Federation, it was dissolved in 1990. The academy had a team that competed in the Division 3.

== History ==
The Institut National du Football de Vichy opened its doors on 6 November 1972. It was an initiative by the French Football Federation, in cooperation with the Groupement du Football Professionnel and the Union Nationale des Footballeurs Professionnels. It functioned in conjunction with the CREPS of Vichy, which opened at the same time as the academy. INF Vichy would include 40 players over the age of 16 in its first year.

The first director of the CREPS housing and of INF Vichy was Jean Forestier. The technical management fell to Pierre Pibarot, supported by the coaches Pierre Balarguet, Francisco Filho, Gérard Banide, and Philippe Troussier. INF Vichy was included in the national championships of France at both youth and senior level.

Initially, INF Vichy's team played only friendly matches. However, from the 1973–74 season onwards, the team played in the Division 3, with two reserve sides participating in the Division 4 and Division d'Honneur.

In 1988, INF Vichy closed its doors and was relocated to Clairefontaine. Over the course of its 16-year history, the academy helped several dozen players turn professional.

== Academy ==
Each year, INF Vichy received 200 to 300 players, but only 30 or so were selected to join the academy in July. However, there would only be around 15 players that would leave the academy for a professional club three years later. The players were aged 16 to 18.

The normal duration of studies was three years, and on the side of learning to become footballers, players received accounting, commerce, or mathematics classes. The best players would go play with the team in the Division 3. Each coach was responsable (manager) of one generation of players, and would follow them during their three years of study. Although the primary goal of INF Vichy was to train players to help them become professional, the academy also had the goal of preparing its players should they fail to make it professionally, and for their post-retirement careers.

== Team ==
Starting in 1973, INF Vichy had a team that participated in the Division 3, the third tier of French football. The team consisted of the academy's best young players, and gave them an experience in competitive football. The results were not of great importance, as the team could neither be relegated or promoted. Since the team was an academy team with minors in it, it could not become professional, and therefore promotion to the Division 2 was not handed to INF Vichy despite winning the Division 3 on two occasions (in the 1978–79 and 1982–83 seasons). The furthest round that the team reached in the Coupe de France was the round of 64, which they reached on four occasions.

=== Honours ===
INF Vichy honours
Honour	No.	Years
Coupe Gambardella	3	1977–78, 1979–80, 1987–88
Division 3	2	1978–79, 1982–83
Division 4	1	1983–84 (reserve team)
Division d'Honneur Auvergne	1	1983–84 (second reserve team)

== Notable people ==
=== Notable instructors ===
- 1972–1976: (France) Gérard Banide (instructor and coach)
- 1986–1990: (France) Christian Damiano (coach)
- 1972–????: (France) Pierre Pibarot (technical director)
- 1973–1976: (France) Pierre Barlaguet
- (Brazil) Francisco Filho
- 1976–1981: (France) Pierre Mosca
- 1983–1984: (France) Philippe Troussier
- 1986–1990: (France) Christian Damiano
- (France) Pierre Michelin
- (France) Claude Dusseau

=== Notable players ===
- (France) Frédéric Dobraje
- (France) Paul Marchioni
- (France) Erick Mombaerts
- (France) Guy Dussaud
- (France) Jean-Luc Ettori
- (France) Alain Larvaron
- (France) Jean-Pierre Truqui
- (France) Philippe Berlin
- (France) Christian Borel
- (France) Yves Brécheteau
- (France) Dominique Chevalier
- (France) Didier Christophe
- (France) Guy Genet
- (France) Robert Jacques
- (France) Dominique Bisbal
- (France) Simeï Ihily
- (France) Bruno Mignot
- (France) Jean-Pierre Mottet
- (France) Alain Couriol
- (France) Dominique Deplagne
- (France) Patrick Rey
- (France) Albert Cartier
- (Serbia) Dragan Cvetković
- (France) Jean-Luc Le Magueresse
- (France) Pascal Mariini
- (France) Jean-Michel Raymond
- (France) Philippe Thys
- (France) Pierre Bianconi
- (France) Alain Bouflet
- (France) Didier Danio
- (France) Pascal Malbeaux
- (France) Pascal Olmeta
- (France) Frédéric Antonetti
- (France) Alain Casanova
- (France) Jean-Michel Simonella
- (France) Noël Vidot
- (France) Gilles Bourges
- (France) Bernard Ferrer
- (France) Jacques Philip
- (France) Philippe Sence
- (France) Dominique Thomas
- (France) Frédéric Zago
- (France) Philippe Burgio
- (France) Thierry Ganthier
- (France) Jean-Claude Nadon
- (France) Jean-Pierre Papin
- (France) Didier Tholot
- (France) Jacky Vidot
- (France) Bernard David
- (France) David Marraud
- (France) Yves Mangione
- (Armenia) Éric Assadourian
- (France) Claude Barrabé
- (France) Nicolas Dehon
- (France) Christophe Avril
- (France) Patrice Colas
- (France) Hubert Fournier
- (France) Sylvain Sansone
- (France) Bruno Valencony
- (France) Emmanuel Hutteau
- (France) Olivier Pickeu
- (France) Guillaume Warmuz
- (France) Emmanuel Rival
- (France) Fabrice Grange
- (France) Fabrice Asencio
- (France) Benoît Beaumet
- (France) Antoine Cervetti
- (France) Christian Bracconi
- (France) Marc Culetto
- (Portugal) Victor Da Silva
- (France) Daniel Wilczynski
- (France) Franck Dumas
- (France) Alain Durand
- (France) Jean-Marie Ferri
- (France) Philippe Gallas
- (France) Alain Grumelon
- (France) Sylver Hoffer
- (France) Didier Knayer
- (France) Patrice Loiseau
- (Italy) Giuseppe Montibeller
- (France) Dominique Ottato
- (France) Patrick Périon
- (France) Jean-Marc Philippon
- (France) David Robert
- (France) Michel Sanchez
- (France) Éric Martin
