= Benoît Beaumet =

French footballer (born 1967)

Personal information
- Full name: Benoît Beaumet
- Date of birth: 22 September 1967 (age 59)
- Place of birth: Blois, France
- Height: 1.81 m (5 ft 11 1/2 in)
- Position: Defender

Senior career*
Years	Team	Apps	(Gls)
1986–1987	INF Vichy	27	(0)
1987–1989	Saint-Dizier	63	(0)
1989–1999	Niort	293	(11)
1999–2000	Paris FC	35	(1)
Total		418	(12)
- * Club domestic league appearances and goals

Benoît Beaumet (born 22 September 1967) is a French former professional footballer who played as a defender.
