= Dussaud =

Dussaud is a French surname, present especially in the Gard department. Notable people with the surname include:

- Guy Dussaud (born 1955), French footballer
- François Dussaud (1870–1953), Swiss physicist and inventor
- René Dussaud (1868–1958), French orientalist, archaeologist, and epigrapher
