= Jean-Marc Philippon =

French footballer (born 1966)

Personal information
- Date of birth: 4 November 1966 (age 59)
- Place of birth: Roanne, France
- Height: 1.75 m (5 ft 9 in)
- Position: Defender

Youth career
- INF Vichy

Senior career*
Years	Team	Apps	(Gls)
1985–1986	INF Vichy		
1986–1987	Limoges	15	(1)
1987–1988	Saint-Dizier	31	(0)
1988–1992	Louhans-Cuiseaux	78	(4)
1993–1995	Stade Briochin	60	(0)
1995–1997	Épinal	49	(3)
1997–1998	Grenoble		
Total		233+	(8+)

Managerial career
- 2003–2004: Toulouse U19
- 2007–2008: Toulouse B
- 2009–2014: Troyes (assistant)
- * Club domestic league appearances and goals

Jean-Marc Philippon (born 4 November 1966) is a French former professional footballer who played as a defender. In his career, he played for INF Vichy, Limoges, Saint-Dizier, Louhans-Cuiseaux, Stade Briochin, Épinal, and Grenoble.

== Post-playing career ==
In 1998, Philippon became a youth coach at Lens. He left the club in 2002 to become a youth coach for Toulouse. He coached the club's under-19 side in the 2003–04 season, and the club's reserve team in the 2007–08 season. From 2002 to 2008, Philippon simultaneously worked as the head of Toulouse's youth academy. From 2009 to 2014, he was an assistant manager at Troyes.
