= Patrick Périon =

French footballer and manager (born 1967)

Personal information
- Date of birth: 6 February 1967 (age 59)
- Place of birth: Mulhouse, France
- Height: 1.79 m (5 ft 10 in)
- Position: Defender

Team information
- Current team: SR Colmar 2 (Manager)

Senior career*
Years	Team	Apps	(Gls)
1984–1986	INF Vichy		
1986–1991	Mulhouse	29	(0)
1991–1993	Gazélec Ajaccio	36	(0)
1993–1995	Châtellerault		
1995–1996	Île-Rousse		
1996–1997	Châtellerault		

Managerial career
- –2012: Illzach B
- 2016: Hirtzbach
- 2018–2019: CS Bourtzwiller
- 2023–: SR Colmar 2
- * Club domestic league appearances and goals

Patrick Périon (born 6 February 1967) is a French football manager and former player who is the head coach of SR Colmar's reserve team. As a player, he played as a defender.

== Coaching career ==
After his playing career, Périon started as a coach. Among other things, he was in charge of Illzach's B team, which he left in December 2012. After leaving Illzach, Périon only became a coach again ahead of the 2016-17 season, where he became the new manager of FC Hirtzbach. However, he didn't last long in his new position, as he was fired in mid-October 2016.

Ahead of the 2018-19 season, Périon became manager of CS Bourtzwiller.

In 2023 Périon joined SR Colmar where he became the coach of the club's U-16 team and responsible for the club's academy. At the beginning of the 2023-24 season he also became coach of the club's reserve team.

== Honours ==
Mulhouse

- Division 2: 1988–89
