= Jean-Pascal Mignot =

French footballer (born 1981)

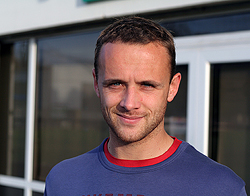

Personal information
- Date of birth: 26 February 1981 (age 45)
- Place of birth: Rouen, France
- Height: 1.83 m (6 ft 0 in)
- Position: Defender

Senior career*
Years	Team	Apps	(Gls)
2002–2011	Auxerre	201	(11)
2011–2014	Saint-Étienne	34	(1)
2014–2016	Sochaux	29	(2)
Total		264	(14)
- * Club domestic league appearances and goals

Jean-Pascal Mignot (French: [ʒɑ̃ paskal miɲo]; born 26 February 1981) is a French former professional footballer who played as defender.

He made the international sporting headlines on 21 October 2010 when he was the first player in the history of the UEFA Champions League to be sent-off without ever actually taking to the field. The incident occurred during a group stage match against AFC Ajax at the Amsterdam Arena. Mignot was warming up on the touchline during the closing moments of the game, and strongly remonstrated against a decision made by the referee, Olegario Benquerenca. The official strode across to Mignot and produced a yellow card, followed swiftly by a red card, after Mignot had continued to speak out of turn.

== Personal life ==
Jean-Pascal's father Bruno is also a former footballer.

== Honours ==
Auxerre

- Coupe de France: 2004-05

Saint-Étienne

- Coupe de la Ligue: 2012–13
