= Elyess Dao =

Moroccan footballer (born 2006)

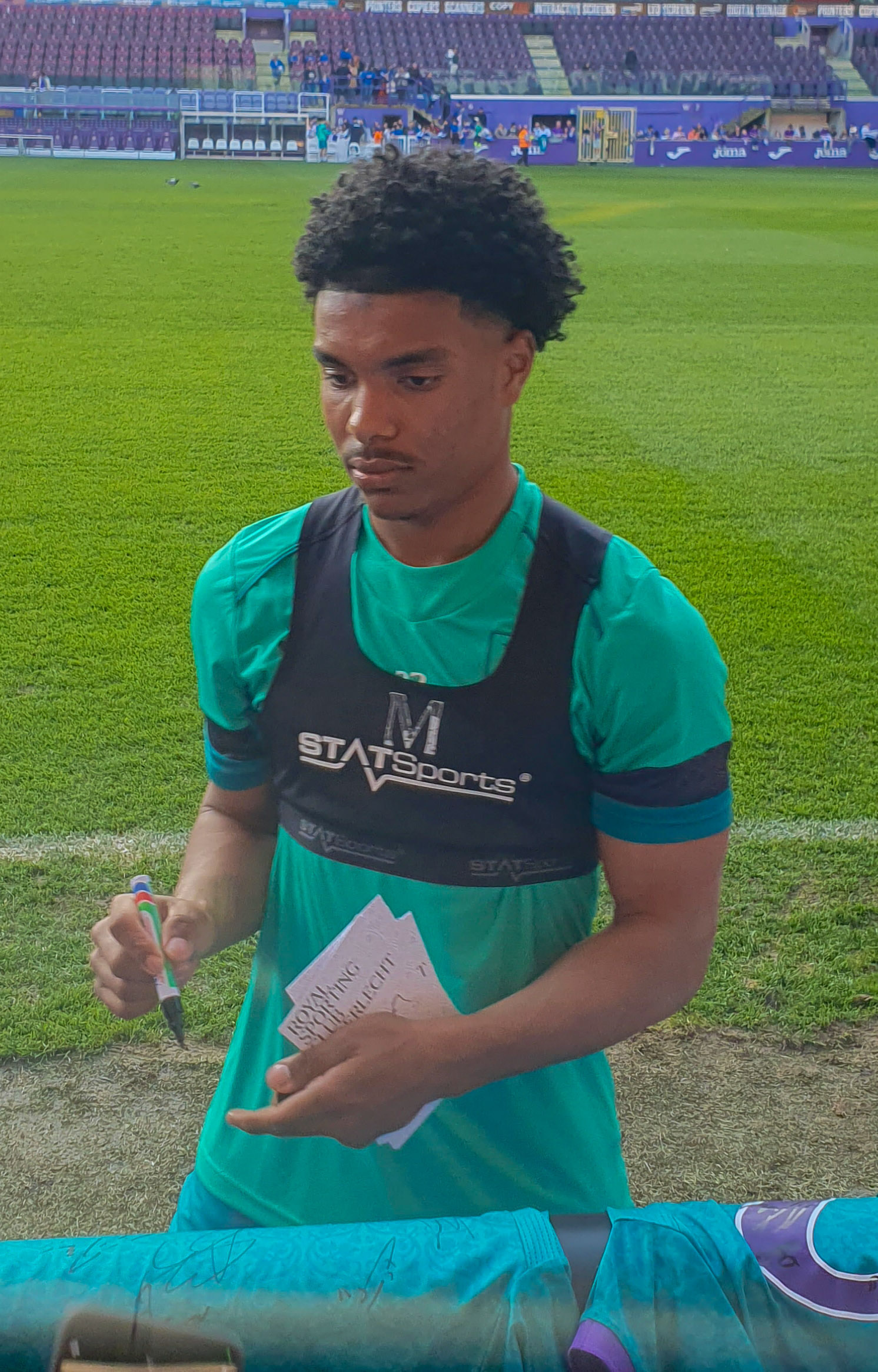
- Dao with Anderlecht in 2025

Personal information
- Full name: Elyèss Houssa Dao
- Date of birth: 20 November 2006 (age 19)
- Place of birth: Toulouse, France
- Height: 1.83 m (6 ft 0 in)
- Position: Forward

Team information
- Current team: RSCA Futures
- Number: 22

Youth career
- 2012–2024: Toulouse

Senior career*
Years	Team	Apps	(Gls)
2024	Toulouse II	1	(0)
2024–2025	Amiens	14	(0)
2025–2026	Anderlecht	3	(0)
2025–	RSCA Futures	12	(1)

International career^{‡}
2022	France U17	2	(0)
2024	Morocco U18	2	(0)
2024	Morocco U20	3	(0)
2026–	Morocco U23	1	(0)
- * Club domestic league appearances and goals as of 21 January 2026 ‡ National team caps and goals as of 26 March 2026

Elyèss Houssa Dao (Arabic: إلياس حوسة داو; born 20 November 2006) is a professional footballer who plays for Challenger Pro League side RSCA Futures as a forward. Born in France, he is a youth international for Morocco.

== Career ==
A youth product of Toulouse FC since 2012, Dao worked his way up their youth categories and debuted with their reserves in the Championnat National 2 on 2024. On 10 July 2024, he transferred to the Ligue 2 club Amiens on a contract until 2027. On 16 August 2024, he made his senior and professional debut with Amiens in a 3–0 Ligue 2 win over Red Star F.C. on 16 August 2024. On 3 February 2025, he transferred to the Belgian First Division A club Anderlecht on a contract until 2029.

== International career ==
Dao was born in France to an Ivorian father and Moroccan mother. On 17 August 2022, he was called up to the France U17s for a set of friendlies. In 2024, he made 3 appearances for the Morocco U18s and Morocco U20s in friendlies.

== Personal life ==
Dao is the son of the Ivorian footballer Issoumaïla Dao.

== Career statistics ==
As of match played 21 August 2025

Appearances and goals by club, season and competition
Club	Season	League			National cup		Europe		Total	
Club	Season	Division	Apps	Goals	Apps	Goals	Apps	Goals	Apps	Goals
Toulouse II	2023–24	CFA 2	1	0	—		—		1	0
Amiens	2024–25	Ligue 2	14	0	3	2	—		17	2
Anderlecht	2024–25	Belgian Pro League	3	0	0	0	1 (Note: Appearances in UEFA Conference League)	0	4	0
Career total			18	0	3	2	1	0	22	2
