= Christian Damiano =

French football coach (born 1950)

Personal information
- Date of birth: 9 March 1950 (age 76)
- Place of birth: Antibes, France
- Position: Defender

Youth career
- 1963–1964: Cagnes
- 1964–1970: Nice

Senior career*
Years	Team	Apps	(Gls)
1967–1974	Nice B		

Managerial career
- 1974–1983: Nice (assistant)
- 1983–1986: Stade Raphaëlois
- 1986–1990: INF Vichy
- 1990–1992: INF Clairefontaine
- 1992–1994: France U16
- 1994–1998: France U18
- 1998–1999: France U17
- 1999–2000: Nice
- 2000–2003: Fulham (assistant)
- 2003–2004: Liverpool (assistant)
- 2004–2005: Southampton (assistant)
- 2007: Parma (assistant)
- 2007–2009: Juventus (assistant)
- 2009–2011: Roma (assistant)
- 2011–2012: Inter Milan (assistant)
- * Club domestic league appearances and goals

Christian Damiano (born 9 March 1950) is a French former professional football player and manager.

== Playing career ==
As a player, Damiano was a defender. Early in his youth career, he played for Cagnes, but he would then join the youth academy of Nice. He played for the B team of the club in the early 1970s.

== Managerial career ==
Damiano stopped playing football in 1974, at the age of 24. From 1974 to 1983, he was simultaneously head of the youth academy and assistant manager of the first team of Nice. From 1983 to 1986, he would then coach Stade Raphaëlois. He would also have various roles at the French Football Federation in this time period.

In 1986, Damiano became a coach at INF Vichy, a football academy. However, after it closed in 1990, he went to work as a coach for its counterpart INF Clairefontaine for two years. From 1992 to 1999, Damiano was a coach at several youth teams of France. In 1999, he was the first-team manager of Nice, and also the assistant manager until 2000.

Damiano first moved to England in 2000 when he was appointed assistant to Jean Tigana at Fulham, and remained at the club until Tigana's departure in 2003. He then returned to work alongside Gérard Houllier again (as they had crossed paths as coaches in France youth teams), this time as an assistant coach at Liverpool, although he departed along with the manager in 2004. He was soon appointed to assist Steve Wigley at Southampton. He was briefly linked with the manager's job of the Australian national team, although he ultimately lost out to Guus Hiddink. Damiano would then go on to work as assistant manager under Claudio Ranieri from 2007 to 2012: he followed him at Parma, Juventus, Roma, and Inter Milan.
