= Fabrice Asencio =

French footballer (1966–2016)

Personal information
- Date of birth: 1 August 1966
- Place of birth: Tulle, France
- Date of death: 4 October 2016 (aged 50)
- Place of death: Dijon, France
- Height: 1.80 m (5 ft 11 in)
- Position: Defender

Youth career
- INF Vichy

Senior career*
Years	Team	Apps	(Gls)
1985–1986	INF Vichy		
1986–1987	Limoges	18	(0)
1987–1992	Dunkerque	127	(1)
1992–1994	Valence	40	(0)
1994–1996	Châtellerault		
1996–1999	Wasquehal	17+ (Note: Statistics are missing for the 1996–97 season.)	(0+)
Total		202+	(1+)

Managerial career
- Evian (assistant)
- * Club domestic league appearances and goals

Fabrice Asencio (1 August 1966 – 4 October 2016) was a French professional footballer who played as a defender. During his career, he made 202 appearances and scored one goal in the Division 2.

== Post-playing career ==
After his playing career, Asencio became a scout. After working for Arles-Avignon, he began working for Evian. He later became an assistant manager to Pascal Dupraz at the club.
