= Alain Grumelon =

French footballer (born 1957)

Alain Grumellon
Personal information
- Date of birth: 22 June 1957 (age 69)
- Place of birth: Ploubalay, France
- Height: 1.74 m (5 ft 9 in)
- Position: Midfielder

Youth career
- INF Vichy

Senior career*
Years	Team	Apps	(Gls)
1976–1983	Lille	203	(6)
1983–1985	Mulhouse	49	(4)
1985–1990	Clermont		
Total		282+	(13+)

International career
1980	France U21	1	(0)

Managerial career
- 1992–1993: Épinal (interim)
- * Club domestic league appearances and goals

Alain Grumelon (born 22 June 1957) is a French former professional footballer who played as a midfielder. He spent half of his career at Lille, where he made 203 appearances and scored six goals in the league.

== Honours ==
Lille

- Division 2: 1977–78
