= Alain Durand =

French footballer (born 1967)

Personal information
- Date of birth: 26 June 1967 (age 59)
- Place of birth: Troyes, France
- Height: 1.73 m (5 ft 8 in)
- Position: Midfielder

Team information
- Current team: Ittihad Tanger (assistant manager)

Youth career
- INF Vichy

Senior career*
Years	Team	Apps	(Gls)
1985–1986	INF Vichy		
1986–1991	Metz	7	(0)
1988–1989	→ Cercle Dijon (loan)	21	(2)
1991–1993	Beauvais	50	(6)
1993–1997	Gueugnon	129	(15)
1997–1999	Troyes	30	(1)
1999–2000	Red Star		
Total		237+	(24+)

Managerial career
- 2021–: Ittihad Tanger (assistant)
- * Club domestic league appearances and goals

Alain Durand (born 26 June 1967) is a French former professional footballer who played as a midfielder. As of August 2021, he works as an assistant manager to Bernard Casoni at Ittihad Tanger.

== Coaching career ==
Durand worked as a fitness coach for Guinean club Horoya AC from 2015 to 2017. In August 2021, he was appointed as an assistant manager at Moroccan club Ittihad Tanger by Bernard Casoni.
