= Alain Fiard =

French footballer (born 1958)

Personal information
- Date of birth: 17 September 1958 (age 68)
- Place of birth: Phnom Penh, Cambodia
- Height: 1.65 m (5 ft 5 in)
- Position: Midfielder

Team information
- Current team: Melbourne City (Technical Director)

Senior career*
Years	Team	Apps	(Gls)
1977–1979	Vichy	25	(3)
1979–1984	Bastia	140	(13)
1984–1987	Auxerre	105	(5)
1987–1993	Lille	182	(11)
Total		452	(32)

Managerial career
- 2001–2004: Auxerre (assistant)
- 2001–2002: Auxerre (caretaker)
- 2004: Raja Casablanca
- 2011–2012: Auxerre (assistant)
- 2017: TP Hồ Chí Minh
- * Club domestic league appearances and goals

Alain Fiard (born 17 September 1958) is a French former professional footballer who played as a midfielder. He is the technical director of Melbourne City FC.

== Career ==
Fiard was born in Phnom Penh, Cambodia. He started his playing career with Vichy and made one Division 3 appearance in the 1977–78 season, before establishing himself as a regular player the following campaign. A move to Division 1 side Bastia ensued in 1979, and two years later he was a part of the team that won the Coupe de France. Fiard transferred to Auxerre in 1984 and went on to play 105 league matches in the next three seasons. In 1987, he was signed by Lille, where he remained for six years until the end of his career. Fiard retired from professional football in 1993, having made more than 450 league appearances.

== Coaching career ==
Fiard was hired as a youth coach at Auxerre in 1997, before being appointed as assistant manager to Guy Roux four years later. Fiard took interim control of the team for five matches during the 2001–02 season when Roux was absent due to illness. He left his assistant post in July 2004 to become manager of Moroccan side Raja Casablanca. However, he left the club in November of the same year.

Between 2005 and 2008, Fiard worked as a scout for his former club Lille, before taking up a supervisory role at Valenciennes. In 2011, he returned to Auxerre as an assistant coach under new manager Laurent Fournier.

In July 2019, Fiard was hired as a technical coach for Australian club Melbourne City FC.

== Managerial statistics ==
As of match played 26 August 2017 for league games only

Managerial record by team and tenure
Team	From	To	Record					Ref
Team	From	To	P	W	D	L	Win %	Ref
Auxerre C	2000	2001	30	8	14	8	26.7	
Auxerre	2001	2002	5	2	2	1	40.0	
Auxerre B	2011	2013	40	19	8	13	47.5	
Hồ Chí Minh City F.C.	2017	2017	24	6	7	11	25.0	
Total			16	5	5	6	31.3	—
