= Didier Knayer =

French footballer (born 1957)

Personal information
- Date of birth: 26 November 1957 (age 68)
- Place of birth: Toulouse, France
- Height: 1.85 m (6 ft 1 in)
- Position: Centre-back

Youth career
- INF Vichy

Senior career*
Years	Team	Apps	(Gls)
1974–1977	INF Vichy		
1977–1979	Bastia	8	(0)
1979–1983	Béziers	115+ (Note: Statistics for the 1981–82 season are incomplete.)	(1+)
1983–1986	Orléans	96	(5)
1986–1989	Martigues	90	(4)
Total		309+	(10+)
- * Club domestic league appearances and goals

Didier Knayer (born 26 November 1957) is a French former professional footballer who played as a centre-back. In his career, he played for INF Vichy, Bastia, Béziers, Orléans, and Martigues.

== Club career ==
After starting his career at INF Vichy, Knayer joined Bastia following a recommendation by Pierre Pibarot. Knayer participated in Bastia's run in the 1977–78 UEFA Cup; he played during the club's 3–1 victory over Newcastle United in the second round. He made eight Division 1 appearances during his stay at the Corsican club. In 1979, Knoyer joined Béziers. Ahead of the 1983–84 season, he was recruited by Orléans. In 1986, Knoyer signed for Martigues. He ended his professional career three years later in 1989.

== International career ==
Knayer was a France youth international.

== Personal life ==
Didier's father Jean-Pierre was also a footballer.

After his football career, Knayer became a real estate developer in Santa-Maria-di-Lota.

== Honours ==
Bastia

- UEFA Cup runner-up: 1977–78
