= Francisco Filho =

Francisco Filho may refer to:

- Francisco Filho (martial artist) (born 1971), Brazilian martial artist
- Francisco Filho (footballer) (born 1940), Brazilian football coach and former footballer
