= Didier Danio =

French footballer (born 1962)

Personal information
- Date of birth: 10 May 1962 (age 64)
- Place of birth: Toulon, France
- Height: 1.80 m (5 ft 11 in)
- Position: Defensive midfielder

Youth career
- –1978: ES Solliès-Pont
- INF Vichy

Senior career*
Years	Team	Apps	(Gls)
1978–1981	INF Vichy		
1981–1986	Auxerre	128	(18)
1986–1987	Rennes	31	(2)
1987–1990	Reims	97	(14)
1990–1993	Nancy	89	(1)
1993–1995	Lorient		
Total		335+	(35+)
- * Club domestic league appearances and goals

Didier Danio (born 10 May 1962) is a French former professional footballer who played as a defensive midfielder. In his career, he played for INF Vichy, Auxerre, Rennes, Reims, Nancy, and Lorient.

== Honours ==
INF Vichy

- Coupe Gambardella: 1979–80

Lorient

- Championnat National: 1994–95
