= Dominique Ottato =

French footballer (born 1968)

Personal information
- Date of birth: 6 August 1968 (age 58)
- Place of birth: Moyenmoutier, France
- Height: 1.70 m (5 ft 7 in)
- Position: Defender

Youth career
- INF Vichy

Senior career*
Years	Team	Apps	(Gls)
1985–1988	INF Vichy		
1988–1997	Charleville	154+ (Note: Statistics are missing from the 1988–89 season to the 1991–92 season.)	(0+)
1997–2000	Rochefort FC		
2000–2002	Gap		

Managerial career
- 2019–2020: Sisteron FC
- * Club domestic league appearances and goals

Dominique Ottato (born 6 August 1968) is a French football manager and former player who played as a defender. He was most recently the head coach of French club Sisteron FC.
