= Dominique Chevalier =

French footballer (1956-2012)

Personal information
- Full name: Dominique René François Chevalier
- Date of birth: 26 June 1956
- Place of birth: Ambert, France
- Date of death: 16 August 2012 (aged 56)
- Place of death: Valence, France
- Height: 1.80 m (5 ft 11 in)
- Position: Defender

Youth career
- INF Vichy

Senior career*
| Years | Team | Apps | (Gls) |
| 1975–1976 | INF Vichy | | |
| 1976–1981 | Valenciennes | 106 | (5) |
| 1981–1983 | Nîmes | 41 | (0) |
| 1983–1984 | Le Puy | | |
| 1984–1985 | Valence | 19 | (0) |
| Total | | 166+ | (5+) |
- * Club domestic league appearances and goals

Dominique René François Chevalier (26 June 1956 – 16 August 2012) was a French professional footballer who played as a defender. He most notably made 106 appearances and scored five goals for Valenciennes in the Division 1.
