= Jacques Philip =

French footballer (born 1963)

Personal information
- Date of birth: 22 March 1963 (age 63)
- Place of birth: Brest, France
- Height: 1.76 m (5 ft 9 in)
- Position: Defender

Youth career
- INF Vichy

Senior career*
Years	Team	Apps	(Gls)
1982–1983	INF Vichy	29	(5)
1983–1986	Lyon	33	(0)
1986–1988	Laval	30	(1)
1988–1990	Caen	28	(0)
1990–1994	Avranches	116	(0)
1994–1996	Quimper	47	(0)
Total		283	(6)
- * Club domestic league appearances and goals

Jacques Philip (born 22 March 1963) is a French former professional footballer who played as a defender. He notably played for Lyon in the Division 2 and for Laval and Caen in the Division 1.
