= Philippe Gallas =

French footballer (born 1959)

Personal information
- Date of birth: 7 April 1959 (age 67)
- Place of birth: Cavaillon, France
- Height: 1.75 m (5 ft 9 in)
- Position: Defender

Youth career
- INF Vichy

Senior career*
Years	Team	Apps	(Gls)
1977–1979	INF Vichy		
1979–1982	Nîmes	32	(0)
- * Club domestic league appearances and goals

Philippe Gallas (born 7 April 1959) is a French former professional footballer who played as a defender. He made thirty-two league appearances for Nîmes from 1979 to 1982.
