= David Robert =

French footballer (born 1969)

Personal information
- Date of birth: 1969 (age 56–57)
- Place of birth: Luxeuil-les-Bains, France
- Height: 1.76 m (5 ft 9 in)
- Position: Midfielder

Youth career
- INF Vichy

Senior career*
Years	Team	Apps	(Gls)
1985–1988	INF Vichy		
1988–1989	Valenciennes	3	(0)
1989–1994	Sochaux	94	(4)
1994–1995	Le Havre	11	(0)
1995–1996	Le Havre B		
Total		97+	(4+)
- * Club domestic league appearances and goals

David Robert (born 1969) is a French former professional footballer who played as a midfielder. In his career, he played for INF Vichy, Valenciennes, Sochaux, and Le Havre.
