= Bruno Mignot =

French football player and manager (born 1958)

Personal information
- Date of birth: 15 April 1958 (age 68)
- Place of birth: Saint-Laurent-en-Caux, France
- Height: 1.78 m (5 ft 10 in)
- Position: Defender

Youth career
- Doudeville
- INF Vichy

Senior career*
Years	Team	Apps	(Gls)
1977–1978	INF Vichy	27	(0)
1978–1980	Bastia	25	(0)
1980–1983	Rouen	62	(4)
1983–1984	Libourne	16	(0)
1984–1987	Fécamp		
Total		130+	(4+)

Managerial career
- 1987–1990: Alençon
- 1991–2008: Fécamp
- 2008–????: Oissel (assistant)
- 2014–2015: Oissel (joint)
- * Club domestic league appearances and goals

Bruno Mignot (born 15 April 1958) is a French former professional football player and manager. In his career, during which he played as a defender, he made a total of twenty-seven Division 1 appearances.

== Personal life ==
Mignot has four children: Jean-Pascal, Bertrand, Alice, and Julie. Jean-Pascal and Bertrand both became footballers. As of 2013, Bruno had three grandchildren.

Following his football career, Mignot pursued university studies to become a teacher. He is the co-founder of Passion Foot, an organisation devoted to children's football.

== Honours ==
Rouen

- Division 2: 1981–82
