= Daniel Wilczynski =

French footballer (born 1956)

Personal information
- Date of birth: 24 September 1956 (age 70)
- Place of birth: France
- Height: 1.74 m (5 ft 9 in)
- Position: Defender

Youth career
- INF Vichy

Senior career*
Years	Team	Apps	(Gls)
1976–1978	INF Vichy		
1978–1980	Paris FC	23	(0)
1980–1981	Tavaux-Damparis	30+ (Note: Statistics are incomplete for the 1980–81 season.)	(0+)
1981–1982	Chaumont		
1982–1983	Nœux-les-Mines	32+ (Note: Statistics are incomplete for the 1982–83 season.)	(0+)
Total		85+	(0+)
- * Club domestic league appearances and goals

Daniel Wilczi
