= Marc Culetto =

French footballer (born 1956)

Personal information
- Date of birth: 29 August 1956 (age 70)
- Place of birth: Brioude, France
- Height: 1.78 m (5 ft 10 in)
- Position: Defender

Team information
- Current team: US Brioude B (head coach); US Brioude (assistant coach and sporting director)

Youth career
- INF Vichy

Senior career*
Years	Team	Apps	(Gls)
1975–1976	INF Vichy		
1976–1981	Monaco	33	(1)
1978–1979	Monaco B		
1981–1982	Béziers	15+ (Note: Statistics are incomplete for the 1981–82 season.)	(0+)
- US Brioude

Managerial career
- US Brioude B
- US Brioude (assistant)
- * Club domestic league appearances and goals

Marc Culetto (born 29 August 1956) is a French former professional footballer who played as a defender. As of the 2021–22 season, he is the head coach of US Brioude's reserve side and an assistant coach for the club's first team. He also works as the first team's sporting director.

== Honours ==
Monaco

- Division 2: 1976–77 Group A
- Coupe de France: 1979–80
