= David Marraud =

French footballer (born 1964)

Personal information
- Date of birth: 3 August 1964 (age 62)
- Place of birth: Jonzac, France
- Height: 1.85 m (6 ft 1 in)
- Position: Goalkeeper

Senior career*
Years	Team	Apps	(Gls)
1982–1985	INF Vichy		
1985–1996	Nantes		
1996–1997	Perpignan		

Managerial career
- 1998–2004: Nantes (goalk. coach)
- 2006–2008: Ajaccio (goalk. coach)
- 2008–2011: UA Cognac
- * Club domestic league appearances and goals

David Marraud (born 3 August 1964) is a French former professional footballer who played as a goalkeeper.
