= Guy Dussaud =

French footballer (born 1955)

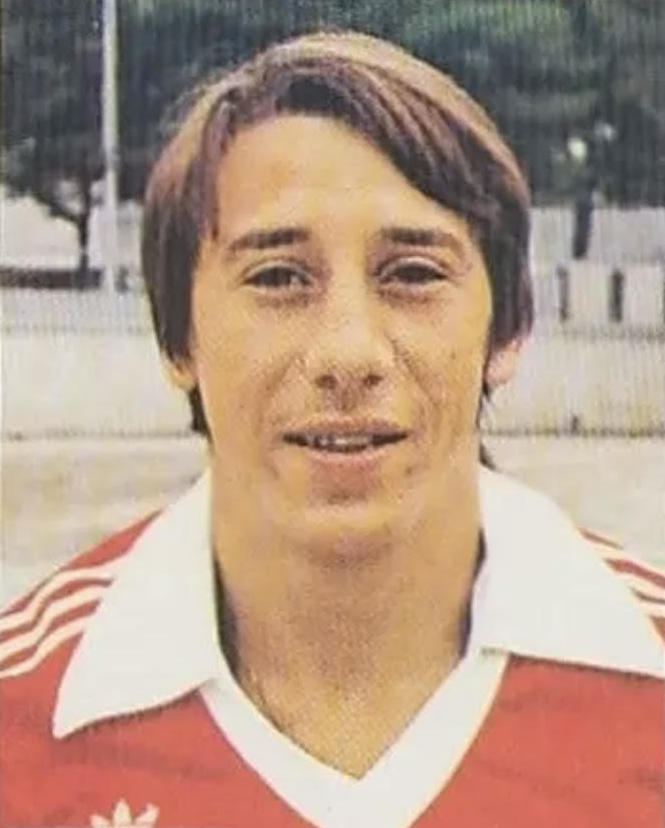
- Dussaud with Nîmes in 1979

Personal information
- Date of birth: 8 December 1955 (age 70)
- Place of birth: Nîmes, France
- Height: 1.68 m (5 ft 6 in)
- Position: Right winger

Youth career
- INF Vichy

Senior career*
Years	Team	Apps	(Gls)
1974–1975	INF Vichy		
1975–1981	Nîmes	108	(18)
1981–1982	Grenoble	30	(6)
1982–1985	Martigues	72	(21)
1985–1988	Pont-Saint-Esprit		
Total		210+	(45+)
- * Club domestic league appearances and goals

Guy Dussaud (born 8 December 1955) is a French former professional footballer who played as a right winger. He most notably played for Nîmes, Grenoble, and Martigues.
