= Jean-Michel Simonella =

French footballer (born 1962)

Personal information
- Full name: Jean-Michel Simonella
- Date of birth: March 27, 1962 (age 64)
- Place of birth: Toulouse, France
- Height: 1.80 m (5 ft 11 in)
- Position: Goalkeeper

Senior career*
Years	Team	Apps	(Gls)
1982–1985	Nîmes	4	(0)
1985–1987	Istres	46	(0)
1987–1991	Chamois Niortais	71	(0)
1991–1993	Épinal	34	(0)
- * Club domestic league appearances and goals

Jean-Michel Simonella (born March 27, 1962) is a former professional footballer who played as a goalkeeper.
