= Sence, Mavrovo i Rostuše =

Sence Сенце Sencë
- Village
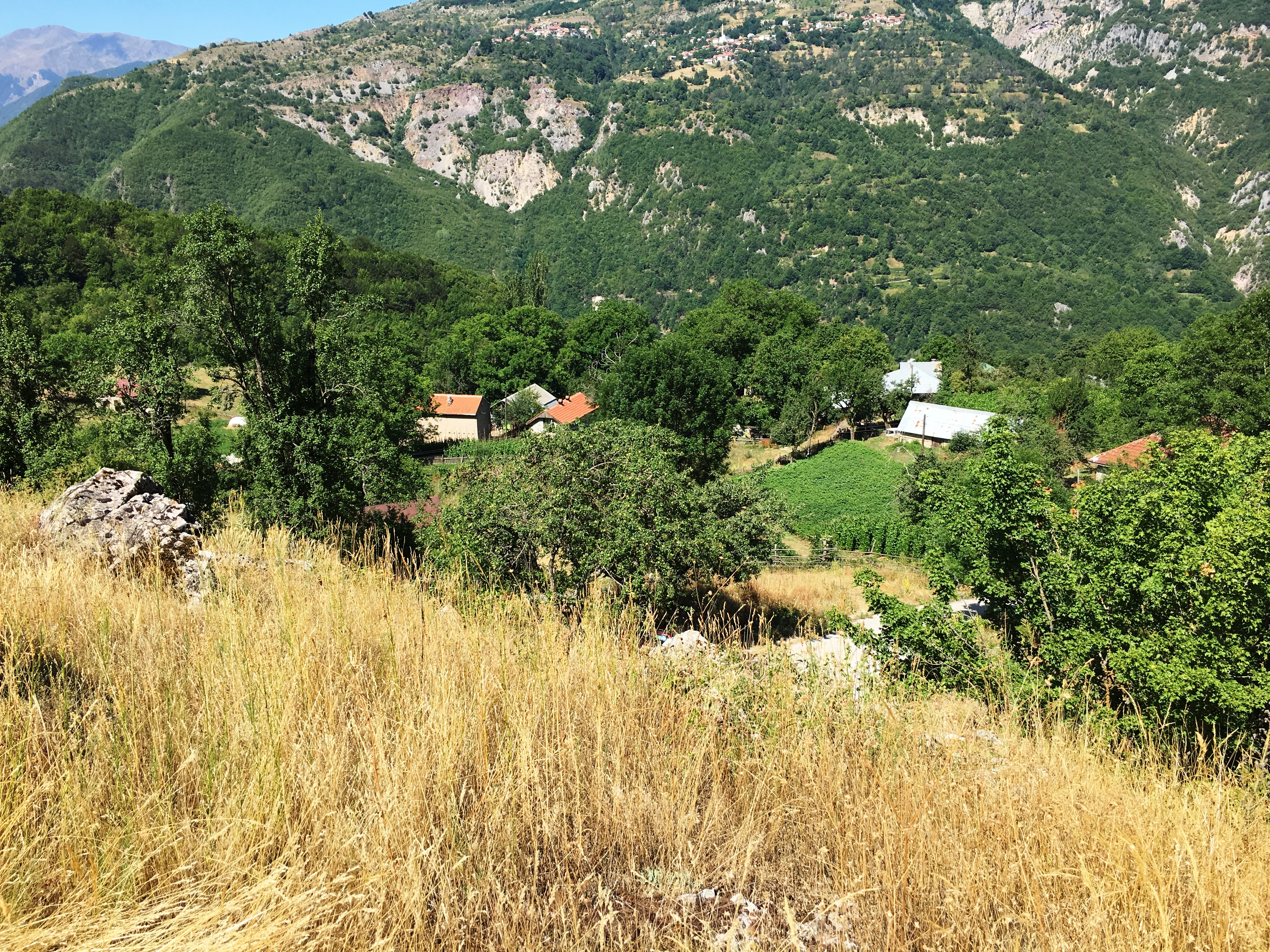
- Houses in the village Sence

- Location within North Macedonia
- Coordinates: 41°41′N 20°39′E
- Country: North Macedonia
- Region: Polog
- Municipality: Mavrovo and Rostuša

Population (2002)
  - Total: 21
- Time zone: UTC+1 (CET)
  - Summer (DST): UTC+2 (CEST)
- Car plates: GV
- Website: .

Sence (Macedonian: Сенце, Albanian: Sencë) is a village in the municipality of Mavrovo and Rostuša, North Macedonia.

== Demographics ==
Sence (Sinec) is attested in the Ottoman defter of 1467 as a village in the ziamet of Reka. The village had 4 households and the anthroponyms recorded depicted is predominantly Albanian in character, with one household bearing a characteristic Slavic name. In 1519, the village had 42 Christian families and 1 Muslim. The census of 1583 records that the village paid the sipahi 2230 akçe per year, had 2 mills (30 akçe tax) and numbered 42 households of whom 30 were Christian and 12 Muslim. Alongside Muslim anthroponyms, the Christian anthroponyms recorded were Albanian and mixed Slavic-Albanian in character: (e.g Hasan Kolçko (Benak), Ibrahim Jovan (Benak), Petri Pavle, Nikolla Petri, Gjin Janko (Panko), Gjin Dimitri, Nikolla Gjin, Siho Gjon, Pejo Jofko, Nikolla Stojko, Jovan Nikolla, Kalan Boshko, Bogdan Todor, Nikolla Gjoni. etc).

In statistics gathered by Vasil Kanchov in 1900, the village of Sence was inhabited by 195 Christian Albanians and 120 Muslim Albanians.

According to the 2002 census, the village had a total of 21 inhabitants. Ethnic groups in the village include:

- Albanians 15
- Macedonians 5
- Bosniaks 1
