= Michel Sanchez (footballer) =

French footballer (born 1967)

Personal information
- Date of birth: 14 April 1967 (age 59)
- Place of birth: Tarascon, France
- Height: 1.71 m (5 ft 7 in)
- Position: Forward

Youth career
- INF Vichy

Senior career*
| Years | Team | Apps | (Gls) |
| 1985–1986 | INF Vichy | | |
| 1986–1987 | Lens B | | |
| 1989–1991 | Le Touquet | | |
| 1991–1993 | Saint-Leu | | |
| 1993–1994 | Perpignan (Note: In 1997, Perpignan FC was renamed to Sporting Perpignan Roussillon. The club became Perpignan Football Catalan in 2001, and Perpignan Canet FC in 2002.) | | |
| 1994–1997 | Pau | | |
| 1997–1998 | Valenciennes | | |
| 1998–1999 | Montauban | | |
| 1999–2000 | Boulogne | | |
| 2000–2004 | Perpignan Canet | | |

Managerial career
- 2002–2004: Perpignan Canet
- * Club domestic league appearances and goals

Michel Sanchez (born 14 April 1967) is a French former professional footballer who played as a forward. He made two appearances for Perpignan in the 1994–95 Division 2.
