= Hassan Lingani =

Ivorian footballer (born 1987)

Personal information
- Date of birth: 30 December 1987 (age 38)
- Place of birth: Attécoubé, Ivory Coast
- Height: 1.84 m (6 ft 0 in)
- Position: Defender

Team information
- Current team: Muret

Youth career
- AS Athlétic d'Adjamé

Senior career*
Years	Team	Apps	(Gls)
2007–2009	US Albi	40	(0)
2009	Bastia	8	(0)
2010–2013	Young Boys Bern	5	(0)
2013	Illzach Modenheim	1	(0)
2013–2014	Dunkerque	0	(0)
2014–2015	AS Muret	20	(2)
2015–2016	Fonsorbes	1	(0)
2016–2017	Jura Sud	26	(0)
2017–2019	Béziers	28	(1)
2019–	Muret	37	(5)
- * Club domestic league appearances and goals as of 1 July 2022

Hassan Lingani (born 30 December 1987) is an Ivorian professional footballer who plays as a defender for French team AS Muret.

== Career ==
Born in Attécoubé, Lingani began his career with AS Athlétic d'Adjamé, playing alongside Seydou Doumbia and Thierry Doubai. The three players were the biggest talents in the academy. After few years with Athlétic, he joined the French lower league club US Albi in July 2007. He played until the summer of 2009, and he signed for SC Bastia. On 31 December 2009, he left Ligue 2 and his club SC Bastia, for which he played eight games in the first half of the 2009–10 season, to join Swiss club Young Boys Bern.

== Personal life ==
His half-brother, Issoumaila Dao, is also a professional footballer.
