= Nicolas Dehon =

French footballer (born 1968)

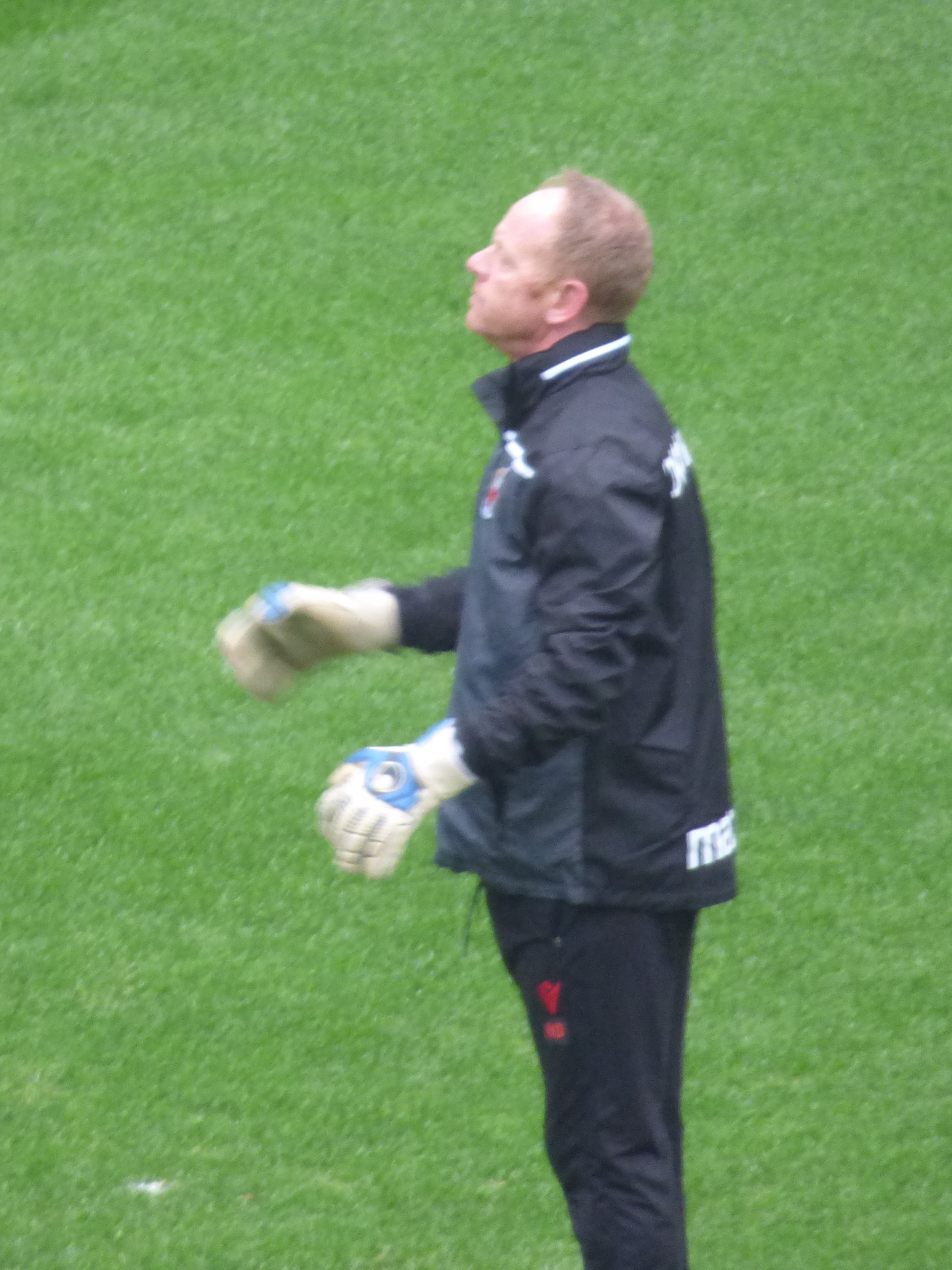
- Dehon in 2021

Personal information
- Full name: Nicolas Dehon
- Date of birth: 2 April 1968 (age 58)
- Place of birth: Maubeuge, France
- Height: 1.85 m (6 ft 1 in)
- Position: Goalkeeper

Team information
- Current team: Nice (Goalkeeping coach)

Youth career
- 1982–1983: Maubeuge
- 1983–1984: Lens
- 1984–1986: INF Vichy

Senior career*
Years	Team	Apps	(Gls)
1986–2000	Troyes	43	(0)
- * Club domestic league appearances and goals

Nicolas Dehon (born 2 April 1968) is a French retired professional footballer who played as a goalkeeper for Troyes. He is the goalkeeping coach at Nice.

== Career ==
Dehon spent his entire playing career as a backup goalkeeper for Troyes, having been with the club for 14 years as they climbed from the French 7th division to the Ligue 1. After retiring as a player, he has worked as a goalkeeper coach with Troyes, Le Havre, PSG, Marseille, Amiens, and most recently Nice.
