= Simeï Ihily =

French footballer (born 1959)

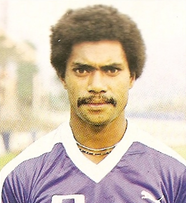
- Ihily with Bastia

Personal information
- Date of birth: 10 April 1959 (age 67)
- Place of birth: Lifou, New Caledonia, France
- Height: 1.82 m (6 ft 0 in)
- Positions: Forward; attacking midfielder; left winger

Youth career
- 1975–1978: INF Vichy

Senior career*
Years	Team	Apps	(Gls)
1978–1985	Bastia	219	(28)
1985–1987	Nîmes	25	(3)
Total		244	(31)
- * Club domestic league appearances and goals

Simeï Ihily (born 10 April 1959) is a French former professional footballer who played as a forward, attacking midfielder, and left winger. He spent his nine-year professional career playing for Bastia and Nîmes, during which he made over 200 appearances in the Division 1.

== Personal life ==
Ihily retired from football in 1987. Later in his life, he became a physical education teacher in Ouvéa in his native New Caledonia.

== Honours ==
Bastia

- Coupe de France: 1980–81
