= Gérard Banide =

French football manager

Personal information
- Date of birth: 12 July 1936 (age 90)
- Place of birth: Paris, France

Managerial career
- Years: Team
- 1973–1976: INF Vichy
- 1976–1979: Monaco (Youth academy)
- 1979–1983: Monaco
- 1983–1984: Mulhouse
- 1984–1986: France (Assistant coach)
- 1986–1988: Marseille
- 1988–1989: Strasbourg
- 1990: Paris Saint-Germain (Assistant coach)
- 1990–1995: Monaco (Youth academy)
- 1995: Monaco
- 1995–2002: Monaco (Youth academy)

Gérard Banide (born 12 July 1936) is a French former football coach. He is the father of Laurent Banide.

== External links and references ==
- Profile
