= Victor Da Silva (footballer, born 1962) =

Portuguese footballer

Personal information
- Date of birth: 21 April 1962 (age 64)
- Place of birth: Porto, Portugal
- Height: 1.73 m (5 ft 8 in)
- Position: Midfielder

Senior career*
Years	Team	Apps	(Gls)
1981–1983	INF Vichy		
1983–1984	Monaco	4	(0)
1984–1988	Alès	134	(7)
1988–1992	Lille	115	(1)
1992–1993	La Roche-sur-Yon	2	(0)
1993–1995	Tours		
Total		255+	(8+)
- * Club domestic league appearances and goals

Victor Da Silva (born 21 April 1962) is a Portuguese former professional footballer who played as a midfielder. He played his entire career in France, where he made 119 appearances and scored one goal in the Division 1. In addition to Portuguese citizenship, he holds French citizenship.

== Honours ==
Monaco

- Coupe de France runner-up: 1983–84
