= Philippe Sence =

French footballer (born 1962)

Personal information
- Full name: Philippe Gaston André Sence
- Date of birth: 1 October 1962 (age 64)
- Place of birth: Hazebrouck, France
- Height: 1.80 m (5 ft 11 in)
- Position: Goalkeeper

Senior career*
Years	Team	Apps	(Gls)
1980–1983	INF Vichy		
1983–1986	Rouen		
1986–1988	Alès		
1988–1993	Bordeaux		
1989–1990	→ Mulhouse (loan)		
1993–1996	Nîmes		

Managerial career
- 1997–1998: Bordeaux (youth)
- 2000–2004: Le Havre (goalk. coach)
- 2004–2006: Strasbourg (goalk. coach)
- 2006–2007: Strasbourg (youth)
- 2007–2011: Grenoble (goalk. coach)
- 2015–2016: Morocco U20 (goalk. coach)
- 2016–2019: Morocco (goalk. coach)
- 2019-: Saudi Arabia (goalk. coach)
- * Club domestic league appearances and goals

Philippe Gaston André Sence (born 1 October 1962) is a French football coach and former player who played as a goalkeeper. He is goalkeeper coach of the Saudi Arabia national team.
