= Frédéric Dobraje =

French footballer (born 1955)

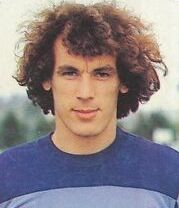
- Dobraje with Brest in the 1982–83 season

Personal information
- Date of birth: 17 May 1955 (age 71)
- Place of birth: Douai, France
- Height: 1.86 m (6 ft 1 in)
- Position: Goalkeeper

Youth career
- 1969–1971: Carabiniers de Billy-Montigny
- 1971–1972: Stade Hénin
- 1972–1974: INF Vichy
- 1974: Lens

Senior career*
Years	Team	Apps	(Gls)
1974–1976	Franc-Comtois	40	(0)
1976–1979	Angoulême	68	(0)
1979	Bastia	5	(0)
1979–1980	Blois	34	(0)
1980–1982	Thonon	66	(0)
1982–1983	Brest	10	(0)
1983–1985	Tours	36	(0)
1985–1986	Béziers	31	(0)
1986–1987	Limoges	34	(0)
1987–1988	Sochaux	1	(0)
1988–1989	Sochaux B		
1989–1990	Bourges		
1990–1995	US Fesches-le-Châtel		
1995–1996	Pont-de-Roide		
Total		325+	(0+)
- * Club domestic league appearances and goals

Frédéric Dobraje (born 17 May 1955) is a French former professional footballer who played as a goalkeeper. He also worked as an agent and sporting director.

== Post-playing career ==
Dobraje became an agent in 1986, while simultaneously playing football. Based in Troyes, he notably rubbed elbows with Bernard Tapie when he was the president of Marseille. Dobraje went on to become the agent of over 200 players, notably including François Brisson, Robert Pires, Bixente Lizarazu, and Stéphane Guivarc'h; he also became the agent of managers Rudi Garcia, Alain Perrin, Guy Stéphan, and Jean-Marc Furlan. In 2000, after having negotiated the transfer of Pires from Marseille to Arsenal, Dobraje was the subject of threats from several people who wanted a part of his agent fee that he made from the transfer.

In March 2009, Dobraje became the sporting director of Dijon. He left this role in November for personal reasons.

== Honours ==
Tours

- Division 2: 1983–84

Individual

- Division 2 Player of the Year: 1981
