= Antoine Cervetti =

French footballer (born 1961)

Personal information
- Date of birth: 19 September 1961 (age 65)
- Place of birth: Bastia, France
- Height: 1.75 m (5 ft 9 in)
- Position: Defender

Senior career*
Years	Team	Apps	(Gls)
1980–1982	INF Vichy	26	(0)
1982–1987	Bastia	53	(0)
1987–1990	Niort	69	(5)
1990–1992	Lille	25	(0)
1992–1999	Porto Vecchio		
Total		173	(5)
- * Club domestic league appearances and goals

Antoine Cervetti (born 19 September 1961) is a French former professional footballer who played as a defender. He made more than 100 appearances in the Ligue 1 playing for Bastia, Niort and Lille. He then spent several years with Porto Vecchio before retiring in 1999.
