= French Division 4 (1978–1993) =

Defunct football league in France

Division 4
- Organising body: French Football Federation
- Founded: 1978
- Folded: 1993
- Replaced by: Championnat National 3
- Country: France
- Other club from: Monaco
- Confederation: UEFA
- Number of clubs: 112
- Level on pyramid: 4
- Promotion to: Division 3
- Relegation to: Division d'Honneur
- Domestic cup: Coupe de France
- International cup: Cup Winners' Cup (via cup)

The French Division 4 was the fourth tier in the French football pyramid from 1978 to 1993. Above it were the Division 1, Division 2, and Division 3. Although it was succeeded by the Championnat National 3, the introduction of the Championnat National meant that the Championnat National 2 became the new fourth division.

== History ==
Before the introduction of Division 4, the Division d'Honneur of regional leagues was the fourth tier in France. Against the advice of these regional divisions, the French Football Federation introduced the D4 in 1978.

In 1993, the Championnat National 3 replaced Division 4. However, the Championnat National 2 became the new fourth tier in the French football league system.

== Format ==
Division 4 followed the same system of being an "open" league as Division 3, mixing together amateur clubs and reserve sides of professional clubs. The 112 teams were split into 8 geographic groups of 14 teams. At the end of the season, the best team from each respective group was promoted to Division 3. The champion of each regional Division d'Honneur was promoted to D4, while the bottom three of each group in D4 were relegated.

To determine a winner of the league, Division 4 included a play-off phase at the end of the season, in which the 8 group winners participated. A group stage with 2 groups of 4 teams was followed by a final to crown a winner.

== Performances by team ==
Division 4 winners by team
Team	Winners	Runners-up	Years won	Years runner-up
Toulouse B	1	1	1992–93	1980–81
Abbeville	1		1978–79	
Meaux	1		1979–80	
Rennes B	1		1980–81	
AS Strasbourg	1		1981–82	
Lisieux	1		1982–83	
INF Vichy B	1		1983–84	
Auxerre Reserves (Note: Second reserve side of Auxerre.)	1		1984–85	
La Rochelle	1		1985–86	
Créteil	1		1986–87	
Vallauris	1		1987–88	
Bastia B	1		1988–89	
Rouen B	1		1989–90	
Fréjus	1		1990–91	
Bourges B	1		1991–92	
Montélimar		1		1978–79
Clermont		1		1979–80
Reims B		1		1981–82
Saint-Raphaël		1		1982–83
Lorient		1		1983–84
Grenoble		1		1984–85
Versailles		1		1985–86
Le Touquet		1		1986–87
RC Strasbourg B		1		1987–88
Paris FC		1		1988–89
Blagnac		1		1989–90
Thouars		1		1990–91
Saint-Malo		1		1991–92
Schiltigheim		1		1992–93

== See also ==
- French Division 3 (1971–1993)

== Bibliography ==
- Championnat de France Division 4, FFF, 1993
