= Pascal Mariini =

French footballer (born 1960)

Personal information
- Full name: Pascal Mariini
- Date of birth: 28 November 1960 (age 65)
- Place of birth: Le Cannet, France
- Height: 1.74 m (5 ft 9 in)
- Position: Striker

Senior career*
Years	Team	Apps	(Gls)
1979–1980	INF Vichy		
1980–1983	Bastia	52	(7)
1983–1985	Besançon	63	(32)
1985–1987	Brest	66	(21)
1987–1989	Chamois Niortais	26	(5)
1988–1989	→ Bastia (loan)	25	(12)
1989–1990	Martigues	26	(3)
1990–1991	Gazélec Ajaccio	25	(6)
1991–1992	Corte		
- * Club domestic league appearances and goals

Pascal Mariini (born 28 November 1960) is a French former professional footballer who played as a striker.
