= Christian Borel =

French footballer (born 1956)

Personal information
- Date of birth: 13 November 1956 (age 68)
- Place of birth: Caen, France
- Height: 1.75 m (5 ft 9 in)
- Position(s): Forward

Senior career*
Years	Team	Apps	(Gls)
1974–1976	INF Vichy		
1976–1977	Lille	12	(1)
1977–1979	Bastia	11	(2)
1979–1981	Épinal		
- *Club domestic league appearances and goals

Christian Borel (born 13 November 1956) is a French former professional footballer who played as a forward. He most notably played for Lille and Bastia in the Division 1.
