= Sylver Hoffer =

French footballer (1967–2011)

Personal information
- Date of birth: 27 July 1967
- Place of birth: Uzès, France
- Date of death: 1 July 2011 (aged 43)
- Height: 1.82 m (6 ft 0 in)
- Position: Forward

Youth career
- INF Vichy

Senior career*
Years	Team	Apps	(Gls)
1985–1986	INF Vichy		
1986–1988	Nîmes	15	(3)
1988–1993	Louhans-Cuiseaux	149	(51)
1993	Martigues	2	(0)
1993–1994	Istres	10	(2)
1994–1995	Bourges		
1995–1997	Montluçon		
1997	Bourges		
Total		178+	(56+)
- * Club domestic league appearances and goals

Sylver Hoffer (27 July 1967 – 1 July 2011) was a French professional footballer who played as a forward. In his career, he played for INF Vichy, Nîmes, Louhans-Cuiseaux, Martigues, Istres, Bourges, and Montluçon.

== Personal life and death ==
Sylver's partner is named Stéphanie, and his brother is named Romuald. He died on 1 July 2011, at the age of 43. His funeral was held on 6 July at the basilica of Saint-Germain-des-Fossés, and he was subsequently cremated at the crematorium of Vichy.
