= Christophe Lagrange =

French footballer (born 1966)

Personal information
- Date of birth: 24 October 1966 (age 60)
- Place of birth: Montcy-Notre-Dame, France
- Position: Forward

Senior career*
Years	Team	Apps	(Gls)
1984–1986	Sedan		
1986–1988	Lens	21	(1)
1988–1994	Angers		
1994–1996	Le Havre	67	(9)
1996–1998	Saint-Étienne	66	(8)
- * Club domestic league appearances and goals

Christophe Lagrange (born 24 October 1966) is a French former professional footballer who played as a forward.
