= French Division 3 (1971–1993) =

Defunct football league in France

Division 3
- Organising body: French Football Federation
- Founded: 1971
- Folded: 1993
- Replaced by: Championnat National 2
- Country: France
- Other club from: Monaco
- Confederation: UEFA
- Number of clubs: 96
- Level on pyramid: 3
- Promotion to: Division 2
- Relegation to: Division d'Honneur (1971–1978); Division 4 (1978–1993)
- Domestic cup: Coupe de France
- International cup: Cup Winners' Cup (via cup)
- Most championships: Auxerre B (5 titles)

The French Division 3 was the third tier in the French football pyramid, after the Division 1 and Division 2, from 1971 to 1993. Although it was succeeded by the Championnat National 2, the newly-created Championnat National became the third tier.

== History ==
In 1971, the Division 3 replaced the previous version of the Championnat de France Amateur. In contrast to the former CFA, the D3 permitted the best amateur clubs to be promoted to the Division 2. It became an "open" league, meaning it was open to professional, semi-professional, and amateur clubs. The fathers of this evolution in the French football pyramid were Fernand Sastre and Henri Patrelle, who were fighting for almost a decade to break this segregation between amateur and professional clubs present since 1932.

In 1993, the Championnat National 2 replaced the Division 3, although the newly-created Championnat National took the place of third tier. The National 2 became the fourth tier of French football.

== Format ==
The league brought together amateur clubs and reserve sides of professional clubs, split into 6 geographic groups of 16 teams, making a total of 96 teams. The reserve teams were not allowed to be promoted to the Division 2, therefore only amateur clubs could have a chance at promotion. This meant that the best amateur club in each respective group was promoted to the D2 at the end of the season, for a total of 6 promoted teams. Concerning relegation, both amateur clubs and reserve sides were eligible; the bottom three teams of each group were relegated to the fourth tier. From 1971 to 1978, this fourth division was the Division d'Honneur of regional leagues, but from 1978 to 1993, a Division 4 was put into place. From the D4, 8 clubs were promoted.

At the end of the season, the winners of each group (both amateur clubs and reserve sides) played against each other in order to crown a champion of the Division 3. This tournament would be concluded with a final. Some finals were played in two-leg confrontations. In 1981, ASPV Strasbourg refused promotion to the Division 2, and therefore won two consecutive D3 titles (in 1980–81 and 1981–82).

== Performances by team ==
Division 3 winners by team
Team	Winners	Runners-up	Years won	Years runner-up
Auxerre B	5	3	1983–84, 1985–86, 1987–88, 1989–90, 1991–92	1984–85, 1990–91, 1992–93
Sochaux B	2	1	1977–78, 1986–87	1975–76
Nice B	2	1	1984–85, 1988–89	
Saint-Étienne B	2		1976–77, 1979–80	
ASPV Strasbourg	2		1980–81, 1981–82	
Nantes B	1	2	1973–74	1976–77, 1982–83
Nancy B	1		1971–72	
Vittel	1		1972–73	
Bastia B	1		1974–75	
Nœux-les-Mines	1		1975–76	
INF Vichy	1		1978–79	
Toulouse B	1		1982–83	
Sedan	1		1990–91	
Lyon B	1		1992–93	
Amiens		2		1973–74, 1977–78
Menton		1		1971–72
Quevilly		1		1972–73
Malakoff		1		1974–75
Metz B		1		1978–79
RC Strasbourg B		1		1979–80
Fontainebleau		1		1980–81
Alès		1		1981–82
Gazélec Ajaccio		1		1985–86
Châtellerault		1		1986–87
Monaco B		1		1987–88
Chaumont		1		1988–89
Rodez		1		1989–90
Charleville		1		1991–92

== See also ==
- French Division 4 (1978–1993)
