= Yves Mangione =

French footballer (born 1964)

Personal information
- Date of birth: 27 December 1964 (age 61)
- Place of birth: Toulon, France
- Height: 1.84 m (6 ft 0 in)
- Position: Forward

Youth career
- INF Vichy

Senior career*
Years	Team	Apps	(Gls)
1985–1986	Rennes	1	(0)
3987–1988	Annecy		
1988–1989	Toulon	13	(2)
1989–1991	Alès	61	(26)
1991	Toulon	2	(0)
1991–1993	Bastia	51	(37)
1993–1994	Valenciennes	38	(17)
1994–1996	Nice	50	(5)
1996–1999	Valence	86	(25)
- * Club domestic league appearances and goals

Yves Mangione (born 27 December 1964) is a French former professional footballer who played as a forward.
