= Pierre Pibarot =

French footballer and manager (1916–1981)

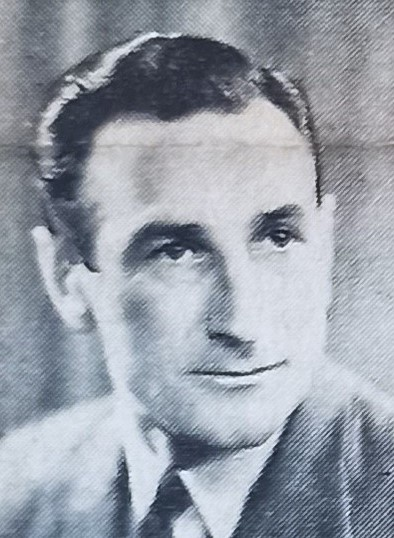
- Pibarot in 1951

Personal information
- Date of birth: 23 July 1916
- Place of birth: Alès, France
- Date of death: 26 November 1981 (aged 65)
- Place of death: Montpellier, France
- Position: Defender

Senior career*
| Years | Team | Apps | (Gls) |
| 1934–1939 | Olympique Alès | | |

Managerial career
- 1945–1948: Olympique Alès
- 1948–1955: Nîmes
- 1951–1954: France
- 1956: France U-21
- 1958–1964: RC Paris
- 1964–1967: Nîmes
- * Club domestic league appearances and goals

Pierre Pibarot (23 July 1916 – 26 November 1981) was a French footballer and manager.

== Playing career ==
Born on 23 July 1916, in Alès, Pibarot is a product of the Olympique Alès youth programme. He left the club briefly in 1932 to play for the now-defunct sporting club attached to the lycée Victor Hugo-de-Marseille. He returned to Olympique Alès in 1934, and was part of the team that won the Ligue 2 championship the following season.

His promising playing career was cut short by a leg injury he received at the Battle of Narvik in 1940; his short-lived return to professional play for Nancy was terminated when he turned manager in 1944, at the age of 29, after being part of the Coupe de France winning Nancy side.

== Post-playing career ==
His old club Olympique Alès offered him the manager's position in 1945; he used the following four years to perfect the 'line defence" technique.

In 1949, he moved to Nîmes Olympique, which team too he took up to Ligue 1, before being tapped to bring his skills to the France national team in 1955. He had already been involved as a technical strategist with the team as early as their friendly against England in 1951.

He ended his career with stints at RCF Paris.

In recognition of his contributions to the science of defence and his excellence as a trainer, the main stadium at France's football academy at Clairefontaine was named for him. The stadium of Olympique Alès, where he is something of a hometown hero, is also named for him in memory of his contributions to the team as player and manager.
