= Issoumaïla Dao =

Ivorian footballer (born 1983)

Personal information
- Date of birth: 27 October 1983 (age 43)
- Place of birth: Adjamé, Ivory Coast
- Height: 1.82 m (6 ft 0 in)
- Position: Defender

Senior career*
Years	Team	Apps	(Gls)
2001–2008	Toulouse	80	(2)
2008–2009	Bastia	15	(0)
2011–2012	Luzenac	40	(2)
2012–2013	Boulogne	24	(0)
2013–2014	Al-Raed	22	(1)
Total		181	(5)
- * Club domestic league appearances and goals

Issoumaïla Dao (born 27 October 1983) is an Ivorian former professional footballer who played as a defender.

In August 2008, he played games on trial for English Championship clubs Doncaster Rovers and Wolverhampton Wanderers.

== Personal life ==
His half-brother, Hassan Lingani, is also a professional footballer. Dao acquired French nationality by naturalization on 10 October 2008, and legally changed his name from Issoumaïla to Yann. His son Elyess Dao began playing football professionally in 2024.
