= CO Saint-Dizier =

French football club

- Full name: Club Olympique de Saint-Dizier
- Founded: 1933
- Ground: Stade Charles Jacquin, Saint-Dizier
- Capacity: 6,990

Club Olympique de Saint-Dizier is a French football club based in Saint-Dizier, Haute-Marne. It was founded in 1933. The club was declared bankrupt in April 2013.

== Notable players ==
- (Ukraine) Oleksandr Zavarov
