= 1981–82 French Division 2 =

43rd season of the second-tier football league in France

Division 2
- Season: 1981–82

Statistics of Division 2 in the 1981/1982 season.

== Overview ==
It was contested by 36 teams, and Toulouse and Rouen won the championship.

== League tables ==
=== Group A ===
Pos	Team	Pld	W	D	L	GF	GA	GD	Pts	Promotion or relegation
1	Toulouse	34	18	10	6	50	25	+25	46	Promoted
2	Thonon	34	18	10	6	38	23	+15	46	
3	Olympique Marseille	34	14	15	5	48	33	+15	43	
4	Toulon	34	15	10	9	62	50	+12	40	
5	Cuiseaux-Louhans	34	16	5	13	49	54	−5	37	
6	Nîmes Olympique	34	14	7	13	57	49	+8	35	
7	Béziers	34	12	11	11	39	35	+4	35	
8	Cannes	34	11	13	10	40	37	+3	35	
9	Orléans	34	12	11	11	33	37	−4	35	
10	Paris FC	34	11	12	11	46	45	+1	34	
11	Gueugnon	34	10	13	11	33	34	−1	33	
12	Grenoble	34	7	18	9	31	29	+2	32	
13	Martigues	34	12	8	14	41	44	−3	32	
14	Libourne	34	10	11	13	37	38	−1	31	
15	Fontainebleau	34	10	10	14	45	47	−2	30	
16	Saint-Dié	34	8	8	18	31	49	−18	24	Relegated
17	Gazélec Ajaccio	34	7	9	18	29	52	−23	23	Relegated
18	Blois	34	6	9	19	26	54	−28	21	Relegated

Source: rsssf.com

=== Group B ===
Pos	Team	Pld	W	D	L	GF	GA	GD	Pts	Promotion or relegation
1	Rouen	34	21	9	4	54	19	+35	51	Promoted
2	Mulhouse	34	22	6	6	73	40	+33	50	Promoted
3	Noeux-les-Mines	34	19	11	4	46	22	+24	49	
4	Le Havre	34	20	6	8	73	38	+35	46	
5	Stade Rennais	34	17	10	7	45	26	+19	44	
6	Stade Reims	34	16	9	9	54	26	+28	41	
7	Angoulême	34	17	7	10	50	33	+17	41	
8	Angers	34	12	10	12	42	39	+3	34	
9	En Avant Guingamp	34	12	5	17	43	42	+1	29	
10	Besançon	34	9	11	14	45	53	−8	29	
11	Stade Français	34	8	13	13	37	50	−13	29	
12	Dunkerque	34	8	12	14	30	39	−9	28	
13	Limoges	34	10	8	16	38	60	−22	28	
14	Berrichonne Chateauroux	34	8	9	17	38	51	−13	25	
15	Abbeville	34	5	13	16	34	65	−31	23	
16	Calais	34	8	7	19	28	69	−41	23	Relegated
17	Montluçon	34	7	8	19	22	54	−32	22	Relegated
18	Stade Quimpérois	34	6	8	20	33	59	−26	20	Relegated

Source: rsssf.com

== Championship play-offs ==
Team 1	Agg.	Team 2	1st leg	2nd leg
Rouen	4–4 (a)	Toulouse	3–2	1–2

== Promotion play-offs ==
Team 1	Agg.	Team 2	1st leg	2nd leg
Mulhouse	5–1	Thonon	3–0	2–1

Mulhouse was qualified to the play-off against 18th placed team of Division 1, Valenciennes.

== Top goalscorers ==
Rank	Player	Club (Grp)	Goals
1	(Socialist Federal Republic of Yugoslavia) Žarko Olarević	Le Havre (B)	25
2	(France) Patrick Martet	Le Havre (B)	23
3	(Burkina Faso) Issicka Ouattara	Mulhouse (B)	22
4	(France) Marc Pascal	Marseille (A)	18
4	(France) Pierre Sither	Châteauroux (B)	18
4	(France) Jean-François Beltramini	Rouen (B)	18
7	(France) André Wiss	Mulhouse (B)	17
7	(France) Antoine Trivino	Louhans-Cuiseaux (A)	17
9	(France) Paco Bandera	Gueugnon (B)	16
9	(Republic of the Congo) François M'Pelé	Rennes (B)	16
