= Jorge Domínguez (footballer, born 1959) =

Argentine footballer (1959–2023)

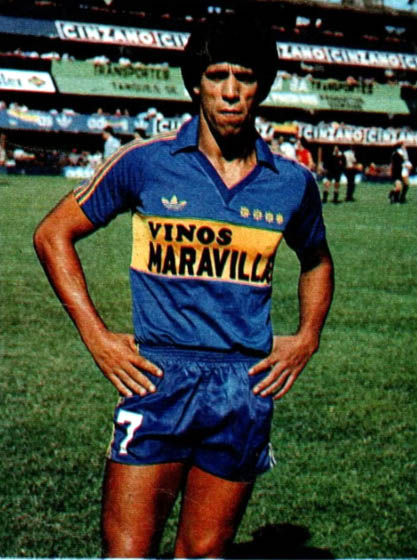
- Domínguez with Boca Juniors in 1983

Personal information
- Full name: Jorge Carlos Alberto Domínguez
- Date of birth: 7 March 1959
- Place of birth: Buenos Aires, Argentina
- Date of death: 30 July 2023 (aged 64)
- Height: 1.83 m (6 ft 0 in)
- Position: Striker

Senior career*
Years	Team	Apps	(Gls)
1978	Boca Juniors	1	(0)
1979–1982	Gimnasia (LP)	91	(41)
1983–1984	Boca Juniors	40	(21)
1984–1986	Nice	57	(38)
1986–1988	Toulon	49	(8)
1988–1989	Nîmes	25	(16)
1989–1990	Tours	30	(19)
1990–1991	Nîmes	22	(10)
1991–1992	Mandiyú	20	(5)
1992	Laferrere	49	(18)

International career
1984	Argentina	3	(0)
- * Club domestic league appearances and goals

Jorge "Potro" Carlos Alberto Domínguez (7 March 1959 – 30 July 2023) was an Argentine professional footballer who played as a striker.

Born in Buenos Aires, Domínguez started his career in 1978 with Boca Juniors where he played in one game against Unión de Santa Fe. He then joined Club de Gimnasia y Esgrima La Plata where he played until his return to Boca Juniors in 1983.

In 1984, he moved to France where he played for Nice, Toulon, Nîmes and Tours. In 1991, he returned to Argentina to play for Mandiyú. His final club was Laferrere of the Argentine second division.

Domínguez died on 30 July 2023, at the age of 64.
