= SC Abbeville =

French football club

Abbeville
- Full name: Sporting Club Abbevillois Foot Côte Picarde
- Founded: 1901; 125 years ago
- Ground: Stade Paul Delique
- Capacity: 5,048
- League: Régional 2 Hauts-de-France Group C
- Website: sc-abbeville.org

Sporting Club Abbevillois Foot Côte Picarde, known as SC Abbeville or simply Abbeville, is a football club based in Abbeville, France. It was founded in 1901. As of the 2023–24, the club's first team competes in the Régional 2, the seventh tier of French football.

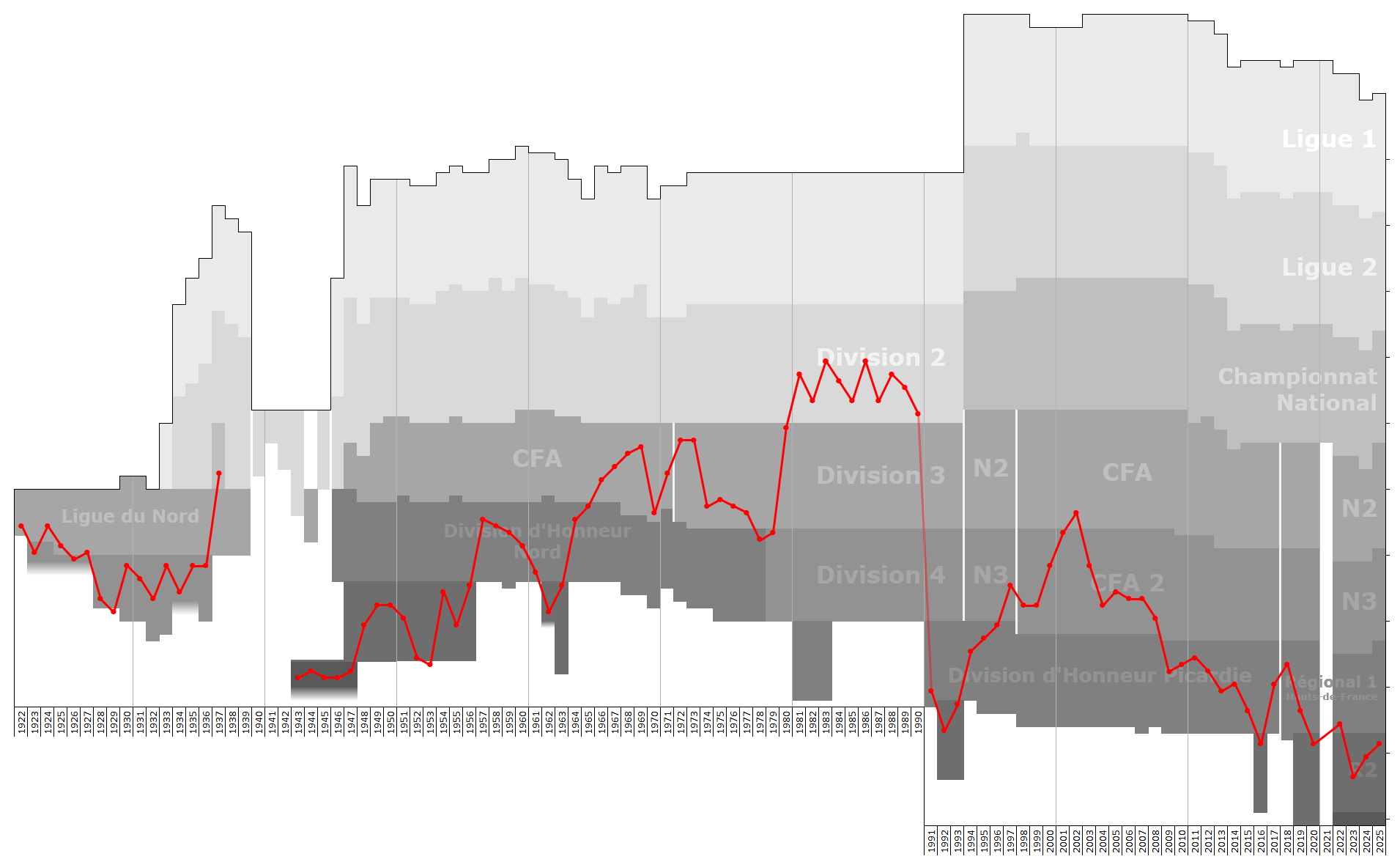
Historical league performance chart of SC Abbeville

== Honours ==
- Division 4
  - Champions (1): 1978–79
