= 1997–98 SC Bastia season =

SC Bastia
1997–98 season
- Chairman: François Nicolaï
- Manager: Frédéric Antonetti
- Stadium: Stade Armand Cesari
- Division 1: 9th
- Coupe de France: End of 32
- Coupe de la Ligue: End of 32
- Intertoto Cup: Champion
- UEFA Cup: 2. round
- Top goalscorer: League: Ermin Šiljak and Ardian Kozniku (5); All: Ermin Šiljak (9)
- Highest home attendance: 10,000 vs Marseille (25 October 1997)
- Lowest home attendance: 2,000 vs Lyon (19 December 1997)
- Average home league attendance: 5,029
Home colours	Away colours

The French football club SC Bastia in its 1997–98 season finished in the 13th place in the league. The top scorer of the season, scoring 9 goals in 5 league matches, wasn Ermin Šiljak. The club was eliminated from the Coupe de France round of 64. In the Coupe de la Ligue it was able to reach the round of 32 teams. It also became the Intertoto Cup winner and advanced to the second round of the UEFA Cup.

== Transfers ==
=== In ===
Summer

- Éric Durand and Frédéric Mendy from Martigues
- Laurent Casanova and Christophe Deguerville from Lyon
- Pascual Garrido from Boca Juniors
- Franck Jurietti from Gueugnon
- Pierre-Yves André from Rennes
- Jean-Jacques Etamé from Cannes
- Nenad Jestrović from OFK Belgrade
- Ľubomír Moravčík from Sion
- Prince Daye from Invincible Eleven
- Hervé Sekli and François Modesto from Bastia B

Winter

- Ali Boumnijel from Gueugnon
- Ardian Kozniku from APOEL
- Pierre Laurent from Leeds United
- Nicolas Penneteau from Bastia B

=== Out ===
Summer

- Patrick Valéry to Blackburn Rovers
- Ľubomír Moravčík, Jean-Jacques Eydelie and Pascal Camadini to Sion
- Laurent Moracchini to Nancy
- Didier Santini to Toulouse
- Pierre Maroselli to Rennes
- Anto Drobnjak to Lens
- Franck Vandecasteele to Nice
- Jamie Fullarton to Crystal Palace
- Laurent Weber to Troyes

Winter

- Ermin Siljak to Servette
- Jean-Jacques Etamé to Saint-Louisienne

== Squad ==
As of 16 July 2012

Note: Flags indicate national team as defined under FIFA eligibility rules; some limited exceptions apply. Players may hold more than one non-FIFA nationality.

No.	Pos.	Nation	Player
1	GK	FRA	Éric Durand
28	GK	TUN	Ali Boumnijel
30	GK	FRA	Nicolas Penneteau
16	GK	FRA	Fabien Piveteau
—	GK	FRA	Hervé Sekli
8	DF	ARG	Pascual Garrido
3	DF	GUI	Morlaye Soumah
4	DF	FRA	Patrick Moreau
5	DF	FRA	Christophe Deguerville
25	DF	FRA	Frédéric Mendy
15	DF	FRA	Franck Jurietti
20	DF	FRA	Laurent Casanova
21	DF	FRA	François Modesto
6	DF	FRA	Cyril Rool
2	MF	FRA	Sébastien Perez
14	MF	SEN	Mamadou Faye

No.	Pos.	Nation	Player
7	MF	POL	Piotr Świerczewski
24	MF	COD	Alain Masudi
22	MF	FRA	Hervé Anziani
27	MF	FRA	Pascal Camadini
17	MF	CMR	Jean-Jacques Etamé
23	MF	GUI	Lansana Soumah
10	MF	SVK	Ľubomír Moravčík
11	FW	SVN	Ermin Siljak
26	FW	CRO	Ardian Kozniku
12	FW	FRA	Pierre-Yves André
18	FW	LBR	Prince Daye
29	FW	FRA	Pierre Laurent
9	FW	YUG	Nenad Jestrović
13	FW	GUI	Ousmane Soumah
19	FW	FRA	Wilfried Gohel

== French Division 1 ==
=== League table ===
Pos	Team	Pld	W	D	L	GF	GA	GD	Pts	Qualification or relegation
7	Auxerre	34	14	9	11	55	45	+10	51	Qualification to Intertoto Cup third round
8	Paris Saint-Germain	34	14	8	12	43	35	+8	50	Qualification to Cup Winners' Cup first round (Note: Paris Saint-Germain qualified for the 1998–99 UEFA Cup Winners' Cup as winners of the 1997–98 Coupe de France and 1997–98 Coupe de la Ligue.)
9	Bastia	34	13	11	10	36	31	+5	50	Qualification to Intertoto Cup second round
10	Le Havre	34	10	14	10	38	35	+3	44	
11	Nantes	34	11	8	15	35	41	−6	41	

Source: Ligue 1
Rules for classification: 1) points; 2) goal difference; 3) number of goals scored.

=== Results summary ===
Overall								Home						Away					
Pld	W	D	L	GF	GA	GD	Pts	W	D	L	GF	GA	GD	W	D	L	GF	GA	GD
34	13	11	10	36	31	+5	50	10	5	2	25	9	+16	3	6	8	11	22	−11

Source: LFP

=== Results by round ===
Round	1	2	3	4	5	6	7	8	9	10	11	12	13	14	15	16	17	18	19	20	21	22	23	24	25	26	27	28	29	30	31	32	33	34
Ground	A	H	A	H	A	H	A	H	A	H	A	A	H	A	H	A	H	A	H	A	H	A	H	A	H	A	H	H	A	H	A	H	A	H
Result	W	W	D	D	W	W	L	D	L	W	L	L	D	L	W	D	W	D	D	D	L	L	W	W	D	D	W	L	L	W	D	W	L	W
Position	6	5	5	3	3	3	3	3	6	4	6	8	8	10	8	7	7	7	8	8	8	9	9	9	9	9	7	9	9	9	9	9	9	9

Source: LFP
A = Away; H = Home; W = Win; D = Draw; L = Loss

=== Matches ===
Date	Opponent	H / A	Result	Goal(s)	Attendance	Referee
2 August 1997	Nantes	A	0 - 1	Perez 60'	22,696	Marc Batta
8 August 1997	Guingamp	H	1 - 0	Siljak 81'	8,000	Serge Léon
16 August 1997	Toulouse	A	1 - 1	Richert 34' (o.g.)	10,000	Claude Colombo
22 August 1997	Châteauroux	H	1 - 1	Siljak 74'	6,000	Bruno Derrien
30 August 1997	Lyon	A	0 - 2	Casanova 2', Jurietti 30'	18,144	Alain Sars
5 September 1997	Bordeaux	H	4 - 1	Jestrovic 24', 31', Etamé 79', Swierczewski 81'	7,000	Rémy Harrel
12 September 1997	Paris SG	A	2 - 0	-	40,000	Marc Batta
21 September 1997	Metz	H	0 - 0	Prince (red card) 70'	7,000	Stéphane Bré
26 September 1997	Rennes	A	2 - 0	Rool (red card) 52'	9,915	Franck Glochon
4 October 1997	Cannes	H	5 - 1	Siljak 3', 39' (pen.), Gohel 29', Jurietti 80', Perez 84'	5,000	Laurent Duhamel
7 October 1997	AS Monaco	A	1 - 0	-	4,000	Serge Léon
17 October 1997	Auxerre	A	2 - 0	Casanova (yellow card) 34' (yellow-red card)	5,500	Gilles Chéron
25 October 1997	Marseille	H	1 - 1	Siljak 4'	10,000	Éric Poulat
31 October 1997	Le Havre	A	2 - 1	Prince 55', Etamé (red card) 78'	9,138	Marc Batta
8 November 1997	Strasbourg	H	2 - 0	Moreau 62' (pen.), Jurietti 74'	5,000	Claude Colombo
15 November 1997	Montpellier	A	1 - 1	Moreau 86' (pen.)	11,263	Stéphane Bré
21 November 1997	Lens	H	1 - 0	Prince 46'	4,500	Pascal Garibian
29 November 1997	Guingamp	A	0 - 0	-	9,344	Philippe Kalt
6 December 1997	Toulouse	H	0 - 0	-	4,500	Bruno Coué
13 December 1997	Châteauroux	A	1 - 1	André 40', Jurietti (red card) 77'	11,278	Alain Sars
19 December 1997	Lyon	H	0 - 1	Rool (red card) 57'	2,000	Serge Léon
10 January 1998	Bordeaux	A	2 - 0	-	15,000	Claude Colombo
21 January 1998	Paris SG	H	2 - 0	Laurent 36', Kozniku 90'	5,000	Gilles Veissière
24 January 1998	Metz	A	0 - 1	Kozniku 38'	14,669	Jean-Claude Puyalt
3 February 1998	Rennes	H	0 - 0	-	3,500	Rémy Harrel
13 February 1998	Cannes	A	1 - 1	Mendy (yellow card) 61' (yellow-red card) , Gohel 71', Garrido (red card) 90'	5,000	Pascal Garibian
20 February 1998	AS Monaco	H	1 - 0	Gohel 61'	5,000	Alain Sars
7 March 1998	Auxerre	H	1 - 2	Swierczewski 13'	5,000	Éric Poulat
15 March 1998	Marseille	A	1 - 0	-	30,000	Laurent Duhamel
28 March 1998	Le Havre	H	2 - 0	Kozniku 31', Jurietti 43'	2,500	Bruno Coué
7 April 1998	Strasbourg	A	1 - 1	Moravcik 82'	18,712	Gilles Veissière
18 April 1998	Montpellier	H	2 - 1	Kozniku 2', Moravcik 68'	2,500	Bruno Ruffray
25 April 1998	Lens	A	5 - 1	Perez 50'	40,478	Pascal Garibian
9 May 1998	Nantes	H	2 - 1	Kozniku 38', Laurent 43'	3,000	Patrick Lhermite

== Coupe de France ==
Date	Tour	Opponent	H / A	Result	Goal(s)	Attendance	Referee
17 January 1998	End of 64	Niort	H	[ 1 - 0]	Prince 7'	2,000	Bruno Coué
8 February 1998	End of 32	Metz	A	[ 1 - 0]	Jurietti (red card) 74', Prince (red card) 82'	8,567	Philippe Kalt

== Coupe de la Ligue ==
Date	Tour	Opponent	H / A	Result	Goal(s)	Attendance	Referee
5 January 1998	End of 32	Nancy	A	2 - 2 (pen. 3 - 2)	André 52', Jestrovic 107'	5,000	Gilles Chéron

== Europe ==
=== UEFA Intertoto Cup ===
==== Group stage ====
Pos	Team	Pld	W	D	L	GF	GA	GD	Pts	Qualification	BAS	GRA	SIL	HRV	EBB
1	(France) Bastia	4	3	0	1	5	3	+2	9	Advanced to semi-finals	—	1–2	1–0	—	—
2	(Austria) GAK	4	2	1	1	5	4	+1	7		—	—	2–0	1–3	—
3	(Denmark) Silkeborg	4	2	0	2	11	4	+7	6		—	—	—	5–0	6–1
4	(Croatia) Hrvatski Dragovoljac	4	2	0	2	7	7	0	6		0–1	—	—	—	4–0
5	(Wales) Ebbw Vale	4	0	1	3	2	12	−10	1		1–2	0–0	—	—	—

Source: rsssf.com

Matches

Date	Opponent	H / A	Result	Goal(s)	Attendance	Referee
22 June 1997	(Croatia) Hrvatski Dragovoljac	A	[ 0 - 1]	Šiljak 45'	3,000	(Switzerland) Carlo Bertolini
5 July 1997	(Denmark) Silkeborg	H	[ 1 - 0]	Šiljak 24', André (red card) 35', Rool (red card) 69'	3,000	(Czech Republic) Josef Krula
13 July 1997	(Wales) Ebbw Vale	A	[ 1 - 2]	Šiljak 12', 31'	950	(Scotland) Thomas Michael McCurry
19 July 1997	(Austria) GAK	H	[ 1 - 2]	F. Mendy 45'	2,500	(Poland) Zygmunt Ziober

==== Qualifying ====
Date	Opponent	H / A	Result	Goal(s)	Attendance	Referee
Semi final
26 July 1997	(Germany) Hamburg	A	[ 0 - 1]	Rool 65'	16,633	(Spain) Manuel Díaz Vega
30 July 1997	(Germany) Hamburg	H	[ 1 - 1] (a.e.t.)	Prince 115'	2,500	(Czech Republic) Vaclav Krondl
Final
12 August 1997	(Sweden) Halmstad	A	[ 0 - 1]	Prince 46'	2,140	(Poland) Ryszard Wójcik
26 August 1997	(Sweden) Halmstad	H	[ 1 - 1] (a.e.t.)	O. Soumah 113'	8,000	(Bulgaria) Daniel Dimitrov

=== UEFA Cup ===
==== First round ====
16 September 1997
First leg match

Bastia (France)	1–0	(Portugal) Benfica
André 80'

Stade Armand Cesari, Furiani
Attendance: 10,080
Referee: Pierluigi Pairetto (Italy)

30 September 1997
Second leg match

Benfica (Portugal)	0–0	(France) Bastia
		Moreau (red card) 87'

Estadio da Luz, Lisbon
Attendance: 20,000
Referee: Laszlo Vagner (Hungary)

Bastia won 1–0 on aggregate.

==== Second round ====
21 October 1997
First leg match

Steaua Bucharest (Romania)	1–0	(France) Bastia
Hrib 66'		Świerczewski (yellow card) 64' (red card)

Stadionul Steaua, Bucharest
Attendance: 20,000
Referee: Ryszard Wojcik (Poland)

4 November 1997
Second leg match

Bastia (France)	3–2	(Romania) Steaua Bucharest
Prince 52', 68'; Šiljak (yellow card) 62' (yellow-red card); Mendy 80'		Munteanu 14', 40'

Stade Armand Cesari, Furiani
Attendance: 10,000
Referee: Gerd Grabher (Austria)

Steaua Bucharest 3–3 Bastia on aggregate. Steaua Bucharest won on away goals rule.

== Statistics ==
=== Top scorers ===
As of 16 July 2012

Place	Position	Nation	Name	Ligue 1	Coupe de France	Coupe de la Ligue	Intertoto Cup	UEFA Cup	Total
1	FW	(Slovakia)	Ermin Siljak	5	0	0	4	0	9
2	FW	(France)	Prince Daye	2	1	0	2	2	7
3	FW	(Croatia)	Ardian Kozniku	5	0	0	0	0	5
4	DF	(France)	Franck Jurietti	4	0	0	0	0	4
5	MF	(France)	Sébastien Perez	3	0	0	0	0	3
=	FW	(France)	Wilfried Gohel	3	0	0	0	0	3
=	MF	(Federal Republic of Yugoslavia)	Nenad Jestrović	2	0	1	0	0	3
=	FW	(France)	Pierre-Yves André	1	0	1	0	1	3
9	FW	(France)	Pierre Laurent	2	0	0	0	0	2
=	FW	(Slovakia)	Ľubomír Moravčík	2	0	0	0	0	2
=	DF	(France)	Patrick Moreau	2	0	0	0	0	2
=	MF	(Poland)	Piotr Świerczewski	2	0	0	0	0	2
=	DF	(France)	Frédéric Mendy	0	0	0	1	1	2
14	DF	(France)	Laurent Casanova	1	0	0	0	0	1
=	MF	(Cameroon)	Jean-Jacques Etamé	1	0	0	0	0	1
=	FW	(Guinea)	Ousmane Soumah	0	0	0	1	0	1
=	DF	(France)	Cyril Rool	0	0	0	1	0	1

=== League assists ===
As of 16 July 2012

Place	Position	Nation	Name	Assists
1	FW	(Slovakia)	Ľubomír Moravčík	4
=	FW	(France)	Prince Daye	4
3	FW	(France)	Pierre-Yves André	3
=	MF	(Poland)	Piotr Świerczewski	3
=	FW	(France)	Wilfried Gohel	3
=	FW	(Federal Republic of Yugoslavia)	Nenad Jestrović	3
7	DF	(France)	Franck Jurietti	2
=	MF	(Senegal)	Mamadou Faye	2
=	MF	(Cameroon)	Jean-Jacques Etamé	2
=	DF	(France)	Laurent Casanova	2
11	FW	(France)	Pierre Laurent	1
=	DF	(France)	Cyril Rool	1
=	DF	(France)	Christophe Deguerville	1
=	FW	(Croatia)	Ardian Kozniku	1
=	FW	(Slovenia)	Ermin Siljak	1
=	MF	(France)	Sébastien Perez	1
