= 1993–94 SC Bastia season =

SC Bastia
1993–94 season
- Chairman: Louis Santoni (until December 1993); François Nicolaï (from December 1993)
- Manager: Léonce Lavagne
- Stadium: Stade Armand Cesari
- Division 2: 3rd & Promoted
- Coupe de France: End of 32
- Top goalscorer: League: Laurent Castro (8); All: Pascal Camadini (9)
- Highest home attendance: 3,500 vs Nancy (25 May 1994)
| Home colours | Away colours |

French football club SC Bastia's 1993–94 season. Finished 3rd place in league and promoted to first league, and Was eliminated to Coupe de France end of 32. Top scorer of the season, including 9 goals in 6 league matches have been Pascal Camadini.

== Transfers ==
=== In ===
Summer

- Laurent Castro from Montpellier (loan)
- Jean-Luc Bernard from Baume les Dames
- Jacky Canosi from Nancy
- Aziz El Ouali & Gilles Leclerc from Nîmes
- Bruno Lippini from CA Bastia Gallia Lucciana
- Michel Padovani from AS Saint-Seurin
- Éric Mura from Strasbourg
- Bruno Rodriguez from Monaco
- Cyril Rool from Aix-en-Provence

Winter

- No.

=== Out ===
Summer

- Morlaye Soumah to Valenciennes (loan)
- Antoine Di Fraya & Yves Mangione to Valenciennes
- Thierry Taberner to FC Gaillard
- Ismaël Triki to Châteauroux
- Olivier Anziani retired

Winter

- No.

== Squad ==
As of 2 March 2022

Note: Flags indicate national team as defined under FIFA eligibility rules; some limited exceptions apply. Players may hold more than one non-FIFA nationality.

| No. | Pos. | Nation | Player |
|---|---|---|---|
| — | GK | FRA | André Biancarelli |
| — | GK | FRA | Bruno Valencony |
| — | DF | FRA | Jean-Luc Bernard |
| — | DF | FRA | Gilles Leclerc |
| — | DF | FRA | Pierre Maroselli |
| — | DF | FRA | Franck Burnier (captain) |
| — | DF | FRA | Éric Mura |
| — | DF | FRA | Jacky Canosi |
| — | DF | FRA | Cyril Rool |
| — | DF | FRA | Didier Santini |
| — | DF | FRA | Étienne Meschini |
| — | MF | FRA | Laurent Moracchini |
| — | MF | FRA | Pascal Camadini |

| No. | Pos. | Nation | Player |
|---|---|---|---|
| — | MF | FRA | Laurent Casanova |
| — | MF | FRA | Michel Padovani |
| — | MF | SEN | Mamadou Faye |
| — | MF | MAR | Aziz El Ouali |
| — | MF | FRA | Stéphane Saillant |
| — | MF | FRA | Stéphane Michel |
| — | MF | FRA | Saïd Belarbi |
| — | FW | FRA | Bruno Rodriguez |
| — | FW | FRA | Bruno Lippini |
| — | FW | FRA | Laurent Castro (on loan from Montpellier) |
| — | FW | FRA | Michel De Lucia |
| — | FW | FRA | Hamid Bourabaa |

== French Division 2 ==
=== League table ===
| Pos | Team | Pld | W | D | L | GF | GA | GD | Pts | Promotion or Relegation |
|---|---|---|---|---|---|---|---|---|---|---|
| 1 | Nice (C, P) | 42 | 18 | 18 | 6 | 47 | 25 | +22 | 54 | Promotion to French Division 1 |
| 2 | Rennes (P) | 42 | 20 | 13 | 9 | 57 | 38 | +19 | 53 | Promotion to French Division 1 |
| 3 | Bastia (P) | 42 | 21 | 11 | 10 | 44 | 29 | +15 | 53 | Promotion to French Division 1 |
| 4 | Nîmes | 42 | 20 | 10 | 12 | 59 | 38 | +21 | 50 | |
| 5 | Red Star | 42 | 20 | 9 | 13 | 61 | 45 | +16 | 49 | |

Source: Ligue 2
(C) Champions; (P) Promoted

=== Results summary ===
| Overall | | | | | | | | Home | | | | | | Away | | | | | |
| Pld | W | D | L | GF | GA | GD | Pts | W | D | L | GF | GA | GD | W | D | L | GF | GA | GD |
|---|---|---|---|---|---|---|---|---|---|---|---|---|---|---|---|---|---|---|---|
| 42 | 21 | 11 | 10 | 44 | 29 | +15 | 74 | 17 | 1 | 3 | 31 | 9 | +22 | 4 | 10 | 7 | 13 | 20 | −7 |

Source: worldfootball.net

=== Results by round ===
| Round | 1 | 2 | 3 | 4 | 5 | 6 | 7 | 8 | 9 | 10 | 11 | 12 | 13 | 14 | 15 | 16 | 17 | 18 | 19 | 20 | 21 | 22 | 23 | 24 | 25 | 26 | 27 | 28 | 29 | 30 | 31 | 32 | 33 | 34 | 35 | 36 | 37 | 38 | 39 | 40 | 41 | 42 |
|---|---|---|---|---|---|---|---|---|---|---|---|---|---|---|---|---|---|---|---|---|---|---|---|---|---|---|---|---|---|---|---|---|---|---|---|---|---|---|---|---|---|---|
| Ground | A | H | A | H | A | H | A | H | A | H | A | H | A | H | A | A | H | A | H | A | H | A | H | A | H | A | H | A | H | A | H | A | H | A | H | H | A | H | A | H | A | H |
| Result | L | W | W | W | D | W | L | W | D | W | W | W | D | L | L | L | W | L | L | D | W | W | W | D | W | D | W | L | D | W | W | D | W | D | L | W | L | W | D | W | D | W |
| Position | 19 | 10 | 7 | 2 | 6 | 2 | 3 | 2 | 1 | 1 | 1 | 1 | 2 | 3 | 4 | 5 | 3 | 8 | 7 | 5 | 4 | 3 | 3 | 3 | 3 | 3 | 3 | 3 | 3 | 3 | 2 | 3 | 3 | 3 | 3 | 3 | 3 | 3 | 3 | 3 | 3 | 3 |

A = Away; H = Home; W = Win; D = Draw; L = Loss

=== Matches ===
| Date | Opponent | H / A | Result | Goal(s) | Attendance | Referee |
|---|---|---|---|---|---|---|
| 24 July 1993 | Nancy | A | 2 - 0 | Maroselli (red card) 34' | 5,750 | Claude Tellène |
| 31 July 1993 | Bourges | H | 3 - 1 | Rodriguez 12', 28', Mura 51' | 2,123 | Franck Glochon |
| 4 August 1993 | Red Star | A | 1 - 2 | Rodriguez 30', 43' | 2,500 | Didier Pauchard |
| 8 August 1993 | Alès | H | 1 - 0 | Burnier 86' | 2,724 | Jacky Legrain |
| 11 August 1993 | Istres | A | 0 - 0 | - | 700 | Gilles Chéron |
| 14 August 1993 | Le Mans | H | 2 - 0 | Bourabaa 18', Camadini 88' | 2,711 | Rémy Harrel |
| 25 August 1993 | Valenciennes | A | 3 - 2 | Faye 6', Rodriguez 40' (pen.) | 5,345 | Pascal Garibian |
| 28 August 1993 | Rouen | H | 2 - 0 | El Ouali 72', 81' | 2,500 | Patrick Anton |
| 1 September 1993 | Nice | A | 2 - 2 | Faye 22', 66' | 6,387 | Marcel Lainé |
| 11 September 1993 | Rennes | H | 2 - 1 | Sorin 34' (o.g.), Michel 55' | 3,100 | Gilles Veissière |
| 18 September 1993 | Niort | A | 0 - 1 | Castro 25' | 4,500 | Jean-Marie Lartigot |
| 22 September 1993 | Valence | H | 2 - 1 | Bourabaa 19', Leclerc 59' (pen.) | 2,628 | Bruno Derrien |
| 25 September 1993 | Mulhouse | A | 1 - 1 | Camadini 78' | 2,897 | Michel Salon |
| 2 October 1993 | Nîmes | H | 1 - 2 | Castro 73' | 3,000 | Georges Ramos |
| 6 October 1993 | Sedan | A | 1 - 0 | Bernard (red card) 80', Leclerc (red card) 80' | 4,541 | Pascal Garibian |
| 16 October 1993 | Dunkerque | A | 1 - 0 | - | 2,549 | Jean-Marie Véniel |
| 23 October 1993 | Saint-Brieuc | H | 2 - 0 | Castro 42', Bourabaa 45' | 2,800 | Michel Bonnichon |
| 27 October 1993 | Charleville | A | 3 - 0 | - | 2,450 | Stéphane Bré |
| 30 October 1993 | Beauvais | H | 0 - 1 | - | 2,000 | Serge Léon |
| 5 November 1993 | Laval | A | 0 - 0 | - | 2,589 | Jean-Claude Puyalt |
| 10 November 1993 | Gueugnon | H | 1 - 0 | Camadini 76' | 1,500 | Alain Lalu |
| 20 November 1993 | Bourges | A | 0 - 2 | Burnier 73', Boyer 90' (o.g.) | 2,064 | Antoine De Pandis |
| 27 November 1993 | Red Star | H | 1 - 0 | Camadini 29' | 1,748 | Claude Colombo |
| 4 December 1993 | Alès | A | 1 - 1 | Camadini 62' | 1,000 | Franck Glochon |
| 11 December 1993 | Istres | H | 1 - 0 | Faye 75' | 1,500 | Patrick Anton |
| 15 January 1994 | Le Mans | A | 0 - 0 | - | 2,846 | Bruno Derrien |
| 29 January 1994 | Valenciennes | H | 2 - 1 | Castro 3', Casanova 69' | 3,500 | Jacques Poulain |
| 5 February 1994 | Rouen | A | 2 - 0 | - | 3,486 | Marcel Lainé |
| 19 February 1994 | Nice | H | 0 - 0 | - | 3,500 | Didier Pauchard |
| 26 February 1994 | Rennes | A | 1 - 2 | Faye (red card) 40', Castro 47', Camadini 53' | 15,462 | Marc Batta |
| 5 March 1994 | Niort | H | 1 - 0 | Bourabaa 75' | 3,290 | Antoine De Pandis |
| 12 March 1994 | Valence | A | 0 - 0 | - | 5,540 | Marc Flosi |
| 26 March 1994 | Mulhouse | H | 1 - 0 | Rool (red card) 36', Leclerc 73' | 3,247 | Georges Ramos |
| 31 March 1994 | Nîmes | A | 0 - 0 | El Ouali (red card) 42' | 6,389 | Germain Zagni |
| 9 April 1994 | Sedan | H | 0 - 1 | - | 2,000 | Rémy Harrel |
| 16 April 1994 | Dunkerque | H | 3 - 0 | El Ouali 31', Castro 46', Casanova 60' | 1,800 | Stéphane Bré |
| 23 April 1994 | Saint-Brieuc | A | 2 - 0 | El Ouali (red card) 74' | 6,490 | Claude Tellène |
| 30 April 1994 | Charleville | H | 3 - 0 | Maroselli 45', Castro 48', 54' | 3,000 | Jean-Marie Véniel |
| 7 May 1994 | Beauvais | A | 0 - 0 | - | 2,514 | Michel Bonnichon |
| 17 May 1994 | Laval | H | 2 - 1 | Leclerc 4' (pen.), Bourabaa 57' (pen.) | 3,500 | Marcel Lainé |
| 21 May 1994 | Gueugnon | A | 0 - 0 | - | 1,527 | Jacques Poulain |
| 25 May 1994 | Nancy | H | 1 - 0 | Casanova 18' | 3,500 | Germain Zagni |

== Coupe de France ==
| Date | Round | Opponent | H / A | Result | Goal(s) | Attendance | Referee |
|---|---|---|---|---|---|---|---|
| 18 December 1993 | 8th tour | Chasselay Foot | H | 4 - 1 | Burnier ?', ?', Camadini ?', ?', Mura (red card) ?' | ? | ? |
| 22 January 1994 | End of 64 | Martigues | A | 0 - 2 | Rodriguez 72', Camadini 89' | 3,000 | Bernard Saules |
| 13 February 1994 | End of 32 | Lens | A | 3 - 0 | - | 18,783 | Alain Sars |

== Top scorers ==
| Place | Position | Nation | Name | Division 2 | Coupe de France | Total |
|---|---|---|---|---|---|---|
| 1 | MF | (France) | Pascal Camadini | 6 | 3 | 9 |
| 2 | FW | (France) | Laurent Castro | 8 | 0 | 8 |
| 3 | FW | (France) | Bruno Rodriguez | 5 | 1 | 6 |
| 4 | FW | (France) | Hamid Bourabaa | 5 | 0 | 5 |
| 5 | DF | (France) | Franck Burnier | 2 | 2 | 4 |
| 6 | MF | (Morocco) | Aziz El Ouali | 3 | 0 | 3 |
| = | MF | (Senegal) | Mamadou Faye | 3 | 0 | 3 |
| = | DF | (France) | Gilles Leclerc | 3 | 0 | 3 |
| = | MF | (France) | Laurent Casanova | 3 | 0 | 3 |
| 10 | Own goals | | | 2 | 0 | 2 |
| 11 | DF | (France) | Éric Mura | 1 | 0 | 1 |
| = | DF | (France) | Pierre Maroselli | 1 | 0 | 1 |
| = | MF | (France) | Stéphane Michel | 1 | 0 | 1 |
