= 1994–95 SC Bastia season =

SC Bastia
1994–95 season
- Chairman: François Nicolaï
- Manager: Léonce Lavagne (until the date 30 September 1994); Frédéric Antonetti (interim 1 October-3 November 1994 and since 4 November 1994)
- Stadium: Stade Armand Cesari
- Division 1: 15th
- Coupe de France: End of 16
- Coupe de la Ligue: Final
- Top goalscorer: League: Anto Drobnjak (12); All: Anto Drobnjak (16)
- Highest home attendance: 8,000 vs Paris SG, AS Monaco and Nice (31 August, 26 November 1994 and 11 February 1995)
- Lowest home attendance: 4,500 vs Auxerre, Martigues and Sochaux (8 January, 4 March and 29 April 1995)
Home colours	Away colours

French football club SC Bastia's 1994–95 season. Finished 15th place in league. Top scorer of the season, including 16 goals in 12 league matches have been Anto Drobnjak. Was eliminated to Coupe de France end of 16 and the Coupe de la Ligue was able to be among the final.

== Transfers ==
=== In ===
Summer

- Morlaye Soumah from Valenciennes
- Pierre Laurent from Brive
- Anto Drobnjak from Red Star Belgrade
- Franck Vandecasteele from Laval
- Jean-Christophe Debu from Toulouse
- Pascal Camadini from Bastia B
- Stéphane Ziani from Nantes
- Flavio from free
- Frédéric Darras, Bernard Maraval and Eric Dewilder from Sochaux

Winter

- No.

=== Out ===
Summer

- Michel Padovani to retired
- Hamid Bourabaa to Istres
- Eric Mura to Vitrolles
- Laurent Castro to Gazélec Ajaccio
- Stéphane Michel to Lyon Duchère
- Aziz El-Ouali to Châteauroux

Winter

- No.

== Squad ==
As of 17 November 2012

Note: Flags indicate national team as defined under FIFA eligibility rules; some limited exceptions apply. Players may hold more than one non-FIFA nationality.

No.	Pos.	Nation	Player
—	GK	(France) FRA	André Biancarelli
—	GK	(France) FRA	Bruno Valencony
—	DF	(France) FRA	Jean-Luc Bernard
—	DF	(France) FRA	Pierre Maroselli
—	DF	(Guinea) GUI	Morlaye Soumah
—	DF	(France) FRA	Frédéric Darras
—	DF	(France) FRA	Jean-Christophe Debu
—	DF	(France) FRA	Didier Santini
—	DF	(France) FRA	Laurent Casanova
—	DF	(France) FRA	Franck Burnier
—	DF	(France) FRA	Gilles Leclerc
—	DF	(France) FRA	Bernard Maraval
—	DF	(France) FRA	Jacky Canosi
—	DF	(France) FRA	Cyril Rool

No.	Pos.	Nation	Player
—	MF	(France) FRA	Philippe Lalanne
—	MF	(France) FRA	Laurent Moracchini
—	MF	(France) FRA	Pascal Camadini
—	MF	(France) FRA	Eric Dewilder
—	MF	(France) FRA	Hervé Anziani
—	MF	(Senegal) SEN	Mamadou Faye
—	MF	(France) FRA	Stéphane Ziani
—	FW	(Brazil) BRA	Flavio
—	FW	(France) FRA	Bruno Rodriguez
—	FW	(France) FRA	Franck Vandecasteele
—	FW	(France) FRA	Pierre Laurent
—	FW	(Federal Republic of Yugoslavia) YUG	Anto Drobnjak
—	FW	(Guinea) GUI	Ousmane Soumah

== French Division 1 ==
=== League table ===
Pos	Team	Pld	W	D	L	GF	GA	GD	Pts
13	Rennes	38	12	12	14	53	55	−2	48
14	Lille	38	13	9	16	29	44	−15	48
15	Bastia	38	11	11	16	44	56	−12	44
16	Nice	38	11	10	17	39	52	−13	43
17	Montpellier	38	9	14	15	38	53	−15	41

Source: Ligue 1
Rules for classification: 1) points; 2) goal difference; 3) number of goals scored.

=== Results summary ===
Overall								Home						Away					
Pld	W	D	L	GF	GA	GD	Pts	W	D	L	GF	GA	GD	W	D	L	GF	GA	GD
38	11	11	16	44	56	−12	44	7	4	8	25	26	−1	4	7	8	19	30	−11

Source: LFP

=== Results by round ===
Round	1	2	3	4	5	6	7	8	9	10	11	12	13	14	15	16	17	18	19	20	21	22	23	24	25	26	27	28	29	30	31	32	33	34	35	36	37	38
Ground	A	A	H	A	H	A	H	A	H	A	H	A	H	A	H	A	H	A	H	H	A	H	A	H	A	H	A	H	A	H	A	H	A	H	A	H	A	H
Result	D	W	L	L	W	L	L	W	D	L	L	W	D	D	L	W	L	D	L	L	D	L	L	W	L	D	D	W	D	W	L	W	L	W	D	D	L	W
Position	13	4	10	13	12	16	16	14	13	14	15	13	13	13	14	13	14	13	15	17	17	17	19	16	18	18	18	16	16	15	17	14	15	13	16	17	17	15

A = Away; H = Home; W = Win; D = Draw; L = Loss

=== Matches ===
Date	Opponent	H / A	Result	Goal(s)	Attendance	Referee
29 July 1994	Cannes	A	0 - 0	Debu (yellow card) (yellow-red card) 84'	5,000	Patrick Anton
2 August 1994	Metz	A	1 - 2	Burnier 22', Laurent 54' (pen.)	12,932	Claude Colombo
7 August 1994	Lyon	H	0 - 1		5,500	Rémy Harrel
13 August 1994	Auxerre	A	2 - 1	Ziani 43'	6,000	Gilles Chéron
20 August 1994	Caen	H	1 - 0	Maroselli 13'	7,000	Serge Léon
27 August 1994	Lille	A	3 - 0	Casanova (red card) 48', Dewilder (red card) 73'	6,373	Philippe Kalt
31 August 1994	PSG	H	1 - 2	Drobnjak 75' (pen.), Debu (yellow card) (yellow-red card) 87'	8,000	Didier Pauchard
10 September 1994	Nice	A	1 - 2	Martin 26' (o.g.), Laurent 36'	9,102	Antoine De Pandis
17 September 1994	Montpellier	H	1 - 1	Casanova 46'	7,000	Alain Sars
23 September 1994	Martigues	A	5 - 2	Drobnjak 56', Laurent 67'	4,500	Franck Glochon
1 October 1994	Rennes	H	1 - 2	Drobnjak 8'	6,000	Claude Tellène
11 October 1994	St. Étienne	A	1 - 2	Camadini 74', Drobnjak 82'	10,878	Bernard Saules
14 October 1994	Bordeaux	H	0 - 0		7,500	Marc Batta
22 October 1994	Le Havre	A	2 - 2	Drobnjak 4', Dewilder 66'	7,175	Marcel Lainé
29 October 1994	Lens	H	1 - 3	Drobnjak 15'	7,000	Georges Ramos
5 November 1994	Sochaux	A	1 - 3	Casanova 26', Drobnjak 73', 90'	3,235	Franck Glochon
9 November 1994	Strasbourg	H	0 - 1	Burnier (red card) 85'	5,000	Joël Quiniou
19 November 1994	Nantes	A	0 - 0	Rool (yellow card) (yellow-red card) 90'	19,430	Philippe Kalt
26 November 1994	Monaco	H	0 - 2	Casanova 65', Rodriguez 70'; Match result normally ended 2 - 2 but; due to the events in the match, Monaco was declared the 2 - 0 winner by the federation, and Stade Armand Cesari was suspended against Metz.	8,000	Antoine De Pandis
8 December 1994	Metz	H	0 - 3	Faye (red card) 2'	1,500	Bernard Saules
17 December 1994	Lyon	A	0 - 0		17,554	Gilles Veissière
7 January 1995	Auxerre	H	0 - 1		4,500	Marcel Lainé
21 January 1995	Caen	A	2 - 1	Drobnjak 59', Rool (yellow card) (yellow-red card) 88'	12,811	Franck Glochon
28 January 1995	Lille	H	3 - 1	Rodriguez 9', 90', Vandecasteele 35'	5,000	Jean-Claude Puyalt
8 February 1995	PSG	A	3 - 0		35,406	Alain Sars
11 February 1995	Nice	H	1 - 1	Vandecasteele 28'	8,000	Serge Léon
24 February 1995	Montpellier	A	0 - 0		8,685	Claude Tellène
4 March 1995	Martigues	H	2 - 0	Vandecasteele 53', Rodriguez 85'	4,500	Stéphane Bré
10 March 1995	Rennes	A	2 - 2	Maroselli 26', Faye 67'	6,988	Philippe Kalt
22 March 1995	St. Étienne	H	2 - 1	Drobnjak 23', Casanova 89'	6,000	Marc Batta
1 April 1995	Bordeaux	A	1 - 0		15,000	Patrick Anton
8 April 1995	Le Havre	H	3 - 2	Drobnjak 52', Rodriguez 65', Ziani 90'	5,000	Bernard Saules
15 April 1995	Lens	A	3 - 0		27,137	Philippe Leduc
29 April 1995	Sochaux	H	1 - 0	Leclerc 3'	4,500	Claude Tellène
6 May 1995	Strasbourg	A	1 - 1	Rodriguez 70'	9,000	Pascal Garibian
19 May 1995	Nantes	H	2 - 2	Rodriguez 52', Burnier 64'	7,000	Serge Léon
27 May 1995	Monaco	A	2 - 1	Laurent 82'	6,000	Joël Quiniou
31 May 1995	Cannes	H	6 - 3	Vandecasteele 5', 28', Rodriguez 6', Drobnjak 50', Camadini 87', Ferhaoui 90' (o.g.)	5,000	Alain Sars

== Coupe de France ==
Date	Round	Opponent	H / A	Result	Goal(s)	Attendance	Referee
14 January 1995	End of 64	Cercle Dijon	A	0 - 1 (a.e.t.)	Laurent 109'	3,168	Gilles Chéron
4 February 1995	End of 32	Cannes	H	3 - 0	Moracchini 68', Drobnjak 73', Vandecasteele 89'	7,000	Georges Ramos
18 February 1995	End of 16	Nancy	H	0 - 1	-	8,000	Pascal Garibian

== Coupe de la Ligue ==
Date	Round	Opponent	H / A	Result	Goal(s)	Attendance	Referee
3 January 1995	End of 32	Amiens	H	3 - 0	Drobnjak 3', Camadini 50', Laurent 65'	800	Claude Colombo
25 January 1995	End of 16	Nantes	A	0 - 1 (a.e.t.)	Lalanne 115'	6,000	Didier Pauchard
14 February 1995	Quarter-final	Guingamp	H	1 - 1 (4 - 3 pen.)	Drobnjak 100'	3,500	Rémy Harrel
25 March 1995	Semi-final	Montpellier	H	3 - 1	Rodriguez 43', Burnier 81', Drobnjak 86'	6,000	Gilles Veissière
3 May 1995	Final	PSG	N	2 - 0	-	24,663	Marcel Lainé

== Top scorers ==
Place	Position	Nation	Name	Ligue 1	Coupe de France	Coupe de la Ligue	Total
1	FW	(Federal Republic of Yugoslavia)	Anto Drobnjak	12	1	3	16
2	FW	(France)	Bruno Rodriguez	8	0	1	9
3	MF	(France)	Franck Vandecasteele	5	1	0	6
=	FW	(France)	Pierre Laurent	4	1	1	6
5	MF	(France)	Laurent Casanova	4	0	0	4
6	DF	(France)	Franck Burnier	2	0	1	3
7	DF	(France)	Pierre Maroselli	2	0	0	2
=	MF	(France)	Stéphane Ziani	2	0	0	2
=	MF	(France)	Pascal Camadini	2	0	0	2
10	FW	(Senegal)	Mamadou Faye	1	0	0	1
=	DF	(France)	Gilles Leclerc	1	0	0	1
=	DF	(France)	Eric Dewilder	1	0	0	1
=	MF	(France)	Laurent Moracchini	0	1	0	1
=	DF	(France)	Philippe Lalanne	0	0	1	1
