= 1994 Coupe de France final =

Final of the 1993–94 edition of the Coupe de France

- Event: 1993–94 Coupe de France
Auxerre	Montpellier
3	0
- Date: 14 May 1994
- Venue: Parc des Princes, Paris
- Referee: Marc Batta
- Attendance: 45,189

The 1994 Coupe de France final was a football match held at the Stade de France, Saint-Denis, Seine-Saint-Denis, France on 14 May 1994.

The match was played between AJ Auxerre and Montpellier HSC in what was the conclusion to the 1993–94 Coupe de France. Auxerre won the match 3–0 thanks to goals by Moussa Saïb, Gérald Baticle and Corentin Martins. It was the first time they had won the trophy.

== Background ==
Neither AJ Auxerre nor Montpellier HSC had been particularly successful in the competition before. Between them, they had only reached the final on four previous occasions.

Montpellier, who were founded under the name Stade Olympique Montpelliérain, had won the cup twice previously. In 1929, Stade Olympique defeated Sète 3–0 in the final. Two years later, they finished runners-up to Club Français. In 1990, by then known as their current moniker, Montpellier defeated RC Paris 2–1 after extra time in the final.

Auxerre's only previous appearance in the final came in 1979 when they lost 4–1 to Nantes.

== Road to the final ==
=== Auxerre ===
Auxerre began the competition with a 3–0 win against Pontivy in the round of 64. They then overcame Sedan 4–2 at home to advance to the round of 16. Sète were Auxerre's next opponents and they defeated the Championnat National club 4–1. In the quarter-finals, Auxerre defeated Racing 92 2–1. In the semi-finals, they defeated Nantes 1–0 to reach the final.

=== Montpellier ===
In the round of 64, Montpellier required a penalty shoot-out to defeat Saint-Malo after a goalless draw. They then saw off Beauvais 3–0 in the subsequent round. Montpellier defeated Laval in the round of 16 with a 2–1 away win. A second penalty shootout was required in the quarter-finals and Montpellier advanced after a goalless draw against Marseille. In the semi-finals, they defeated Lens 2–1 at home to reach the final.

Auxerre			Round	Montpellier
Opponent	H/A	Result	1993–94 Coupe de France	Opponent	H/A	Result
Pontivy	A	3–0	Round of 64	Saint-Malo	A	0–0 (a.e.t.); 4−2 pen.
Sedan	H	4–2	Round of 32	Beauvais	A	3–0
Sète	A	4–1	Round of 16	Laval	A	2–1
Racing 92	A	2–1	Quarter-finals	Marseille	A	0–0 (a.e.t.); 4−3 pen.
Nantes	H	1–0	Semi-finals	Lens	H	2–0

== Match details ==
14 May 1994
20:00

Auxerre	3–0	Montpellier
Saïb 17'; Baticle 48'; Martins 86'

Parc des Princes, Paris
Attendance: 45,189
Referee: Marc Batta

AJ AUXERRE:
GK	1	(France) Lionel Charbonnier
DF	5	(France) Alain Goma
DF	2	(France) Franck Silvestre
DF	4	(Netherlands) Frank Verlaat
DF	3	(France) Stéphane Mahé
MF	6	(France) Raphaël Guerreiro
MF	11	(France) Christophe Cocard	(substituted off) 88'
MF	8	(Algeria) Moussa Saïb
FW	9	(France) Gérald Baticle
FW	7	(France) Corentin Martins (c)
FW	10	(France) Pascal Vahirua	(substituted off) 87'
Substitutes:
DF	15	(France) Franck Rabarivony	(substituted on) 87'
FW	14	(France) Lilian Laslandes	(substituted on) 88'
Manager:
(France) Guy Roux Assistant Referees: Fourth Official:

MONTPELLIER HSC:
GK	1	(France) Claude Barrabé
DF	2	(France) Bertrand Reuzeau	(substituted off) 57'
DF	5	(France) Serge Blanc
DF	4	(Armenia) Michel Der Zakarian
DF	3	(France) Thierry Laurey
MF	6	(France) Philippe Périlleux	(substituted off) 57'
MF	8	(France) Jérôme Bonnissel
MF	7	(France) Bruno Carotti
MF	10	(France) Fabien Lefèvre
FW	9	(France) Christophe Sanchez
FW	11	(France) Franck Rizzetto
Substitutes:
DF	15	(France) Bruno Alicarte	(substituted on) 57'
FW	14	(France) Fabrice Divert	(substituted on) 57'
Manager:
(France) Gérard Gili

== See also ==
- 1993–94 Coupe de France
