= 1993–94 Coupe de France =

Tournament details
- Country: France

Final positions
- Champions: Auxerre
- Runners-up: Montpellier

Tournament statistics
- Top goal scorer(s): Gerald Baticle (5 goals)

The Coupe de France 1993–94 was its 77th edition. It was won by AJ Auxerre.

== Round of 64 ==
Team 1	Score	Team 2
Strasbourg (D1)	1–1 (a.e.t.) (2–3 p)	Bordeaux (D1)
Le Havre (D1)	2–3	Beauvais (D2)
Lille (D1)	1–2 (a.e.t.)	Rennes (D2)
Lyon (D1)	2–0	Nîmes (D2)
Martigues (D1)	0–2	Bastia (D2)
Saint-Leu (Nat.1)	0–1	Metz (D1)
Guingamp (Nat.1)	3–2 (a.e.t.)	Cannes (D1)
Muret (Nat.1)	0–1	Monaco (D1)
Châteauroux (Nat.1)	1–0	Angers (D1)
Pau (Nat.1)	1–1 (a.e.t.) (4–3 p)	Saint-Étienne (D1)
Sète (Nat.1)	1–0	Caen (D1)
Brive (Nat.1)	0–0 (a.e.t.) (2–4 p)	Marseille (D1)
Épinal (Nat.1)	1–2	Sochaux (D1)
Vaulx-en-Velin (Nat.2)	0–2	Nantes (D1)
Saint-Malo (Nat.2)	0–0 (a.e.t.) (2–4 p)	Montpellier (D1)
Pontivy (DH)	0–3	Auxerre (D1)
Trélazé (DH)	0–5	Lens (D1)
Côte Chaude (DHR)	0–10	Paris Saint-Germain (D1)
Neuville-sur-Saône (DHR)	1–2 (a.e.t.)	Toulouse (D1)
Laval (D2)	2–0	Rouen (D2)
Alès (D2)	2–1	Perpignan (Nat.1)
Évry (Nat.1)	0–1	Charleville (D2)
Bourges (D2)	0–0 (a.e.t.) (5–6 p)	Châtellerault (Nat.1)
Fécamp (Nat.1)	1–1 (a.e.t.) (3–4 p)	Valenciennes (D2)
Forbach (Nat.3)	0–1	Sedan (D2)
Sens (Nat.3)	0–4	Le Mans (D2)
Vitrolles (DH)	0–4	Red Star (D2)
Lyon-Duchère (Nat.1)	3–0	Rodez (Nat.2)
Racing 92 (Nat.2)	2–1	Paris FC (Nat.1)
Carquefou (DH)	0–1	Lorient (Nat.1)
Viry-Châtillon (Nat.2)	0–1	Libourne (Nat.2)
Avion (DH)	1–1 (a.e.t.) (3–1 p)	Lons-le-Saunier (Nat.3)

== Round of 32 ==
Team 1	Score	Team 2
Sochaux (D1)	0–1	Marseille (D1)
Toulouse (D1)	0–2	Monaco (D1)
Le Mans (D2)	0–0 (a.e.t.) (7–8 p)	Bordeaux (D1)
Beauvais (D2)	0–3	Montpellier (D1)
Auxerre (D1)	4–2	Sedan (D2)
Laval (D2)	1–1 (a.e.t.) (3–1 p)	Lyon (D1)
Lens (D1)	3–0	Bastia (D2)
Lorient (Nat.1)	0–2 (a.e.t.)	Nantes (D1)
Châtellerault (Nat.1)	3–1 (a.e.t.)	Metz (D1)
Avion (DH)	1–4 (a.e.t.)	Paris Saint-Germain (D1)
Rennes (D2)	1–1 (a.e.t.) (3–4 p)	Valenciennes (D2)
Guingamp (Nat.1)	2–1	Red Star (D2)
Pau (Nat.1)	1–1 (a.e.t.) (6–7 p)	Charleville (D2)
Alès (D2)	3–0	Lyon-Duchère (Nat.1)
Châteauroux (Nat.1)	1–1 (a.e.t.) (1–4 p)	Racing 92 (Nat.2)
Sète (Nat.1)	1–0	Libourne (Nat.2)

== Round of 16 ==
Team 1	Score	Team 2
Nantes (D1)	1–0	Bordeaux (D1)
Monaco (D1)	0–0 (a.e.t.) (3–4 p)	Marseille (D1)
Laval (D2)	1–2	Montpellier (D1)
Lens (D1)	3–1 (a.e.t.)	Charleville (D2)
Valenciennes (D2)	2–1	Alès (D2)
Guingamp (Nat.1)	0–1	Paris Saint-Germain (D1)
Sète (Nat.1)	1–4	Auxerre (D1)
Châtellerault (Nat.1)	0–1	Racing 92 (Nat.2)

== Quarter-finals ==
19 April 1994	Racing 92 (4)	1–2	Auxerre (1)	Paris
	Akiana 8'		Baticle 32'; Verlaat 40'	Stadium: Stade Yves-du-Manoir; Attendance: 5,148; Referee: Rémi Harrel

23 April 1994	Paris Saint-Germain (1)	1–2	Lens (1)	Paris
	Guérin 25'		Boli 70'; Laigle 72'	Stadium: Parc des Princes; Attendance: 20,223; Referee: Philippe Leduc

23 April 1994	Nantes (1)	3–1	Valenciennes (2)	Nantes
	Pedros 20'; Ouédec 71' (pen.); Ferri 88'		Duncker 29'	Stadium: Stade de la Beaujoire; Attendance: 19,000; Referee: Marcel Lainé

11 May 1994	Marseille (1)	0–0 (a.e.t.) (3–4 p)	Montpellier (1)	Marseille
				Stadium: Stade Vélodrome; Attendance: 35,000; Referee: Joël Quiniou

== Semi-finals ==
10 May 1994	Auxerre (1)	1–0	Nantes (1)	Auxerre
	Verlaat 47'			Stadium: Stade de l'Abbé Deschamps; Attendance: 15,000; Referee: Alain Sars

10 May 1994	Lens (1)	0–2	Montpellier (1)	Lens
			Sanchez 68'; Carotti 81'	Stadium: Stade Félix-Bollaert; Attendance: 45,000; Referee: Georges Ramos

== Final ==
14 May 1994
20:00

Auxerre	3–0	Montpellier
Saïb 17'; Baticle 48'; Martins 86'

Parc des Princes, Paris
Attendance: 45,189
Referee: Marc Batta

== Topscorer ==
Gerald Baticle (5 goals)
