= Nicolas Still =

Belgian football coach (born 1997)

Personal information
- Date of birth: 7 March 1997 (age 29)
- Place of birth: Braine-l'Alleud, Belgium

Team information
- Current team: Auxerre (assistant coach)

Managerial career
- Years: Team
- 2022–2023: Eupen (assistant)
- 2023–2024: Reims (assistant)
- 2024–2025: Lens (assistant)
- 2025: Gent (assistant)
- 2025–2026: Club Brugge (assistant)
- 2026–: Auxerre (assistant)

Nicolas Still (born 7 March 1997) is a professional football coach who is the assistant coach of French club Auxerre in Ligue 1.

He has worked as a video analyst and an assistant manager, mainly for his brothers Will and Edward Still, and for Ivan Leko.

== Career ==
Born in Braine-l'Alleud in Walloon Brabant to English parents, Still is the youngest brother of football managers Will and Edward Still. He began his career as a video analyst for Sint-Truiden and Club Brugge in Belgium, before joining Al Ain of the UAE Pro League in 2019. He was brought to the Emirati club by former Club Brugge manager Ivan Leko.

In January 2021, after Leko and Edward Still had left for Shanghai Port, Franky Vercauteren took over at Royal Antwerp and named Nicolas Still as his video analyst. At the end of the 2020–21 Belgian First Division A, his contract was set to expire amidst speculation he would join Edward Still's coaching team at Charleroi; this came to fruition. In November 2022, Edward Still became manager of fellow top-flight team Eupen and named Nicolas Still as his assistant.

For 2023–24, Nicolas Still moved to Reims in the French Ligue 1, assisting his brother Will. On 5 November 2023, due to his brother's suspension, Nicolas Still led the club to a 1–0 win away to Nantes that put them in 4th place. The Stills left at the end of the season, having finished 11th. In June 2024, Will Still was hired by Lens in the same league, and named both his brothers as assistants.

In June 2025, Still returned to the country of his birth and reunited with Leko for the first time in five years, becoming his assistant at Gent. On 9 December, the pair rejoined Club Brugge, both signing a contract until June 2028.

Still moved to Auxerre in Ligue 1 for 2026–27, working under his brother Will.
