= Edward Still =

Belgian-English football coach and manager

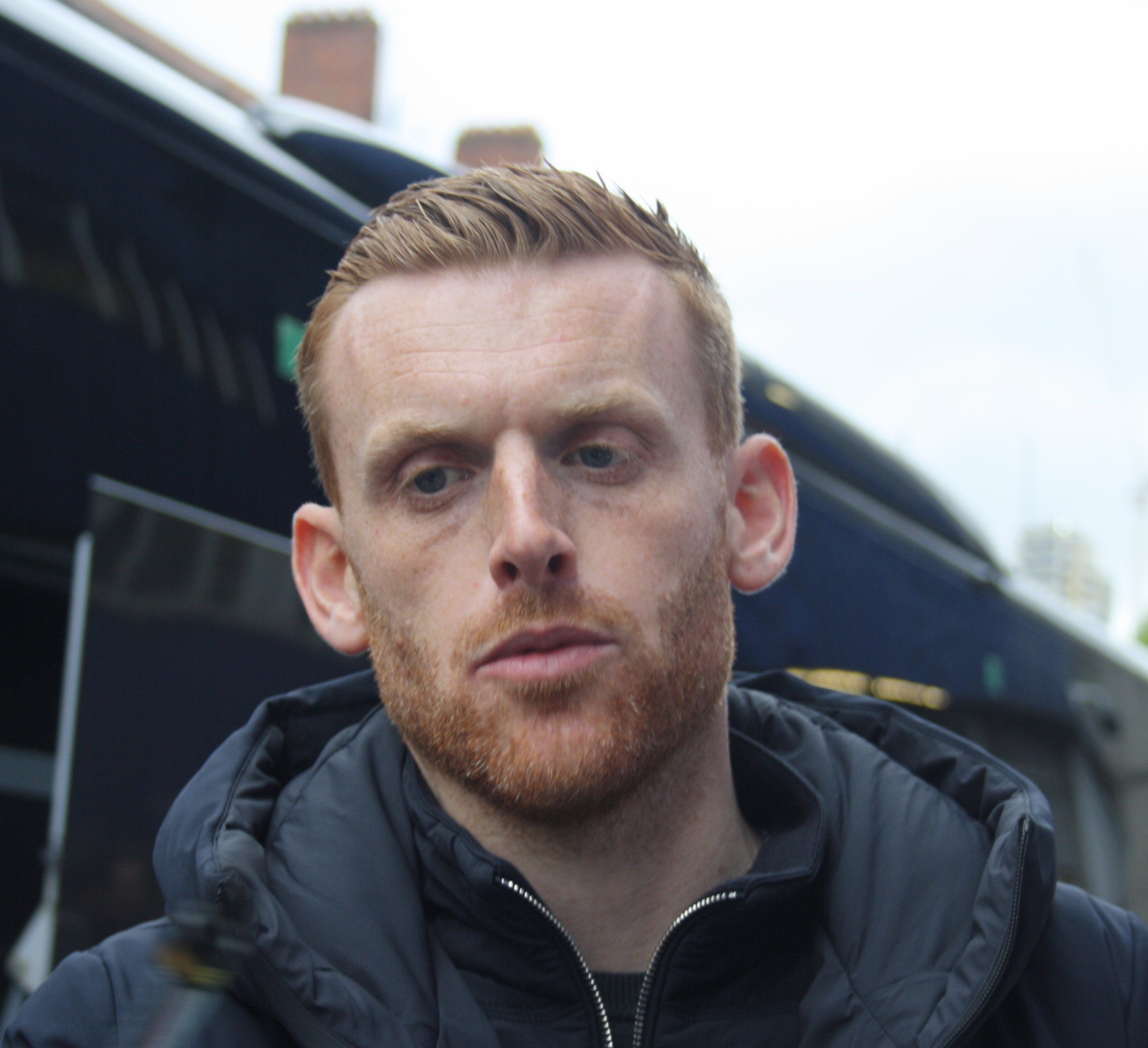
- Still in 2026

Personal information
- Full name: Edward Still
- Date of birth: 30 December 1990 (age 35)
- Place of birth: Braine-l'Alleud, Belgium

Managerial career
- Years: Team
- 2021–2022: Charleroi
- 2022–2023: Eupen
- 2023: Kortrijk
- 2026: Anderlecht (interim)
- 2026: Watford
- 2026: La Louvière

Edward Still (born 30 December 1990) is a football manager.

Born in Belgium to English parents, Still has managed Charleroi, Eupen, Kortrijk, Anderlecht and La Louvière in the Belgian Pro League, starting at age 30. From February to May 2026, he was manager of Championship club Watford.

== Biography ==
=== Early life and career ===
Still was born in Belgium to English parents, Still's parents, Jane (née Bagley) and Julian Richard Still, left the United Kingdom for Belgium somewhere around the year 1990. He is the brother of fellow manager Will Still and video analyst Nicolas Still. He was raised speaking English and attended a French‑language school in Walloon Brabant. In football, Still started his career as youth coach at Racing Jet Wavre and Royale Union Rixensartoise. In the meantime, he studied at Loughborough University, UCLouvain, KU Leuven and Erasmus University Rotterdam.

In September 2015, he became assistant of Croatian manager Ivan Leko, initially as video-analyst at Sint-Truiden, but thereafter he followed Leko as assistant at Club Brugge. When Leko was coach at Al Ain, Still went on to work as a project manager at Vlerick Business School and as an analyst on the RTBF football talk show La Tribune. In May 2020, Still rejoined Leko's staff at Antwerp, then Shanghai Port in early 2021.

=== Charleroi ===
In May 2021, Still returned from China to start his first job as lead manager at age 30, at Charleroi, where he succeeded Karim Belhocine. On his debut on 24 July on the first day of the Belgian Pro League season, he won 3–0 away to Oostende.

On 22 October 2022, Still was sacked by Charleroi, having taken 16 points from a possible 42 at the start of his second season. His final result was a 4–1 loss at Cercle Brugge.

=== Eupen ===
In November 2022, Still became the manager of Eupen, also in the top division. After the 2022 FIFA World Cup, his debut was a late 1–0 win away to Seraing on 23 December. He was sacked on 25 April after taking 12 points from a potential 51; his final two games were lost 5–1 at home to Zulte Waregem and 7–0 at Club Brugge.

=== Kortrijk ===
Still began the 2023–24 season as manager of Kortrijk, and was the first manager sacked, on 25 September. He had won none and drawn two of his eight games.

=== Lens and Anderlecht ===
In June 2024, Still moved to be assistant coach at Lens, working alongside his brothers, Will and Nicolas. A year later, he returned to the country of his birth, being hired as assistant to Besnik Hasi at Anderlecht. Upon Hasi's dismissal on 1 February 2026, Still became interim head coach. His debut four days later was a 1–0 home loss to Royal Antwerp in the first leg of the Belgian Cup semi-finals, followed by a 2–0 defeat away to Genk in the league on 8 February.

=== Watford ===
On 9 February 2026, Still was appointed as head coach at EFL Championship club Watford on a two-and-a-half-year contract. Five days later, his debut was a 2–2 draw away to Preston North End. Watford announced on 3 May that they had parted company with Still. The club had won three of his 15 games, and fallen from 11th to 16th.

=== La Louvière ===
Seventeen days after leaving Watford, Still returned to Belgium's top flight, joining La Louvière. Due to taking a new job soon after leaving Watford, he lost some of his compensation. He was sacked on 8 November 2026, with the club second from bottom, with seven points; their last game was a 1–0 loss to Cercle Brugge after missing two penalties.

== Personal life ==
Still is in a relationship with Belgian politician Rachel Sobry, the mayor of Thuin. Their son was born in 2025.

== Managerial statistics ==
As of matches played 7 November 2026

Managerial record by team and tenure
Team	From	To	Record					Ref.
Team	From	To	P	W	D	L	Win %	Ref.
Charleroi	1 July 2021	22 October 2022	55	22	11	22	40.0	
Eupen	22 November 2022	25 April 2023	17	2	6	9	11.8	
Kortrijk	2 July 2023	25 September 2023	8	0	2	6	0.0	
Anderlecht (interim)	1 February 2026	9 February 2026	2	0	0	2	0.0	
Watford	9 February 2026	3 May 2026	15	3	4	8	20.0	
La Louvière	1 July 2026	Present	12	3	1	8	25.0	
Total			109	30	24	55	27.5	
