= Will Still =

Belgian football manager (born 1992)

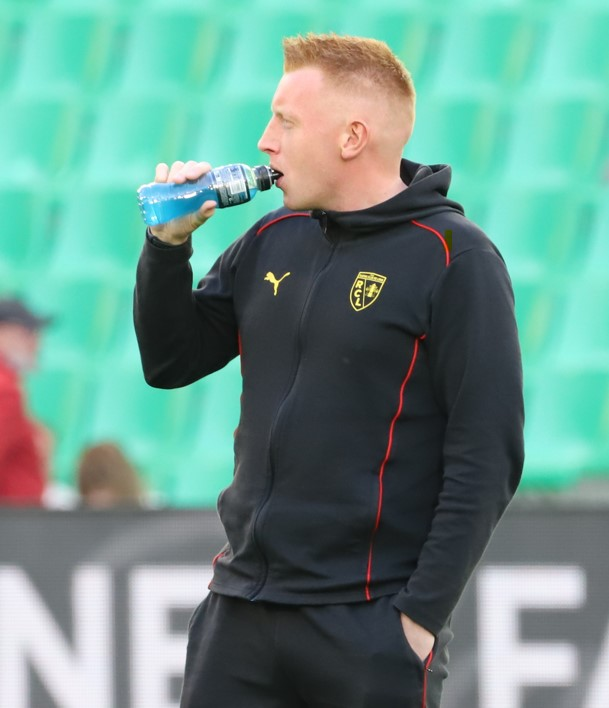
- Still as Lens manager in 2024

Personal information
- Full name: William Still
- Date of birth: 14 October 1992 (age 34)
- Place of birth: Braine-l'Alleud, Belgium

Team information
- Current team: Auxerre (head coach)

Youth career
- Sint-Truiden
- Mons

Senior career*
| Years | Team | Apps | (Gls) |
- Tempo Overijse

Managerial career
- 2017: Lierse
- 2021: Beerschot
- 2022–2024: Reims
- 2024–2025: Lens
- 2025: Southampton
- 2026–: Auxerre
- * Club domestic league appearances and goals

William Still (born 14 October 1992) is a professional football manager who is the head coach of Ligue 1 club Auxerre.

Born in Belgium to English parents, Still played youth and amateur football in Belgium before beginning coaching at the age of 17. In 2017, aged 24, he led Lierse in the Belgian First Division B, managing Beerschot in the same league four years later. He subsequently managed Reims and Lens in Ligue 1. He was appointed manager of EFL Championship club Southampton in May 2025 but was dismissed from this role in November 2025. Still returned to Ligue 1 as head coach of Auxerre in June 2026.

== Early life ==
William Still was born on 14 October 1992 in Braine-l'Alleud, Belgium to English parents, Jane (née Bagley) and Julian Richard Still, who left the United Kingdom two years earlier. His father worked for Shell. Still has two brothers, Nicolas and Edward, both also active in football. He holds dual Belgian and British citizenship.

Growing up in the Walloon region, near Brussels, he went to a French language school and then learned Dutch by playing for Flemish football clubs. He went through Sint-Truiden and Mons youth teams, and finally played for Mons reserve team and amateur club Tempo Overijse, back then playing in the Belgian Fourth Division.

Still has stated that playing the Football Manager and Championship Manager video game series helped him to decide to switch focus from playing at the age of 17, and move to England to start studying to become a coach at Myerscough College in Preston, Lancashire.

Still is a fan of English club West Ham United.

== Managerial career ==
=== Early career ===
Still started his career as assistant of the U14 manager of Preston North End, where he had an internship as part of his football studies at Myerscough College. In 2014, he became video analyst at Sint-Truiden, after successfully using a match analysis to convince manager Yannick Ferrera. In 2015, the team were promoted to the Belgian First Division A, and when Ferrera switched to Standard Liège, Still followed him. That season, Standard Liège won the Belgian Cup, but in September 2016, both Ferrera and his assistants were sacked.

=== Lierse ===
In April 2017, Still started a new position at second division team Lierse, combining the video analyst job with the assignment as assistant manager of Frederik Vanderbiest. In June 2017, Still returned to Standard Liège, only to leave two days later as his new club did not want to fulfill the agreed upon arrangements as part of the contract negotiations.

Still was able to return immediately to Lierse, where (at just 24 years of age) he was appointed caretaker manager in October due to the sacking of Vanderbiest. Eventually, Lierse employed Still as full-time manager. Still managed to guide the team to 21 points out of 27, including a seven-game winning streak. The 2–0 victory against Westerlo of 2 December 2017 became his last match as head coach however, as he did not possess a UEFA A Licence, which is required in the Belgian First Division B to remain in charge for more than 60 days. Still stayed with Lierse but became the assistant of David Colpaert, who was formerly his assistant.

=== Beerschot ===
At the end of the 2017–18 season, Lierse was declared bankrupt. Still left for Beerschot to become assistant of Stijn Vreven. Under his successor, Hernán Losada, Beerschot and Still were promoted to the Belgian First Division A. After Losada left mid-January 2021 to start as head coach of D.C. United, Still became the new manager of Beerschot. At the end of the 2020–21 season, despite finishing 9th, Beerschot's owners decided to hire the more experienced Peter Maes to take them into the next season. The team finished last and were relegated.

=== Reims ===
Following his departure from Beerschot, Still joined Ligue 1 team Reims as assistant to manager Óscar García. Following four months in France, Still was offered roles at two Belgian clubs and chose to return to Standard Liège. Still explained that part of the reasoning behind this was the fact that his UEFA Pro licence was registered in Belgium, so he was having to drive back and forth between Belgium and Reims to attend courses, which was becoming a strain on his time.

At the end of the 2021–22 season, Still returned to the Ligue 1 side as an assistant manager. After García was sacked on 13 October 2022, Still took over as caretaker manager. Following an undefeated stretch of five games, he was appointed as manager for the rest of the 2022–23 season, becoming the youngest manager in Europe's top five leagues at 30 years of age. Since he did not hold a UEFA Pro Licence, Reims was fined €25,000 for every match Still managed until he started a monthly course at the National Football Centre near Brussels.

He started his tenure as head coach at Reims with a 14-game unbeaten streak in all competitions which ended with a 3–1 defeat against Toulouse in the Coupe de France round of 16, including two draws against league leaders Paris Saint-Germain. With a 1–0 win against Monaco on 12 March 2023, Still extended his unbeaten start as Reims manager to 17 matches, setting a new Ligue 1 record. He also became just the second manager to reach this mark in top-five European leagues in the 21st century, following Tito Vilanova with 18 matches at Barcelona in 2012–13. A week later, his undefeated streak in Ligue 1 came to an end after a 2–1 home defeat against Marseille. Reims finished the season in 11th.

On 2 May 2024, shortly before the end of the 2023–24 Ligue 1 season, Still left by mutual consent. His team were in 11th, having won two of their last 14 games.

=== Lens ===
On 10 June 2024, Still signed as the new Lens manager on a three-year deal. The team had finished 7th the previous season; on 18 May 2025, Still announced his departure from the club, who went on to finish 8th. He was assisted by both his brothers during his time at the club.

=== Southampton ===
On 25 May 2025, Still signed a three-year contract with Southampton. His first competitive game in charge on 9 August was a 2–1 home victory against Wrexham. On 2 November, Still was dismissed following a 2–0 home defeat against Preston North End. He left the club with two league wins in thirteen matches, leaving Southampton 21st in the Championship.

=== Auxerre ===
On 12 June 2026, Still signed a two-year contract with the option of a third as head coach with Ligue 1 side Auxerre.

== Personal life ==
Still is in a relationship with Sky Sports reporter Emma Saunders. In March 2025, he received her blessing to continue working while she was suffering from encephalitis.

== Managerial statistics ==
As of match played 21 November 2026

Managerial record by team and tenure
| Team | From | To | Record | | | | |
| Team | From | To | G | W | D | L | Win % |
|---|---|---|---|---|---|---|---|
| Lierse | 6 October 2017 | 2 December 2017 | 9 | 7 | 1 | 1 | 77.78 |
| Beerschot | 19 January 2021 | 30 June 2021 | 13 | 5 | 2 | 6 | 38.46 |
| Reims | 13 October 2022 | 2 May 2024 | 64 | 25 | 18 | 21 | 39.06 |
| Lens | 10 June 2024 | 18 May 2025 | 37 | 16 | 8 | 13 | 43.24 |
| Southampton | 25 May 2025 | 2 November 2025 | 16 | 4 | 6 | 6 | 25.00 |
| Auxerre | 12 June 2026 | Present | 11 | 3 | 2 | 6 | 27.27 |
| Total | | | 150 | 60 | 37 | 53 | 40.00 |
