= Stade de la Meinau =

Football stadium in Strasbourg, France

- La Meinau
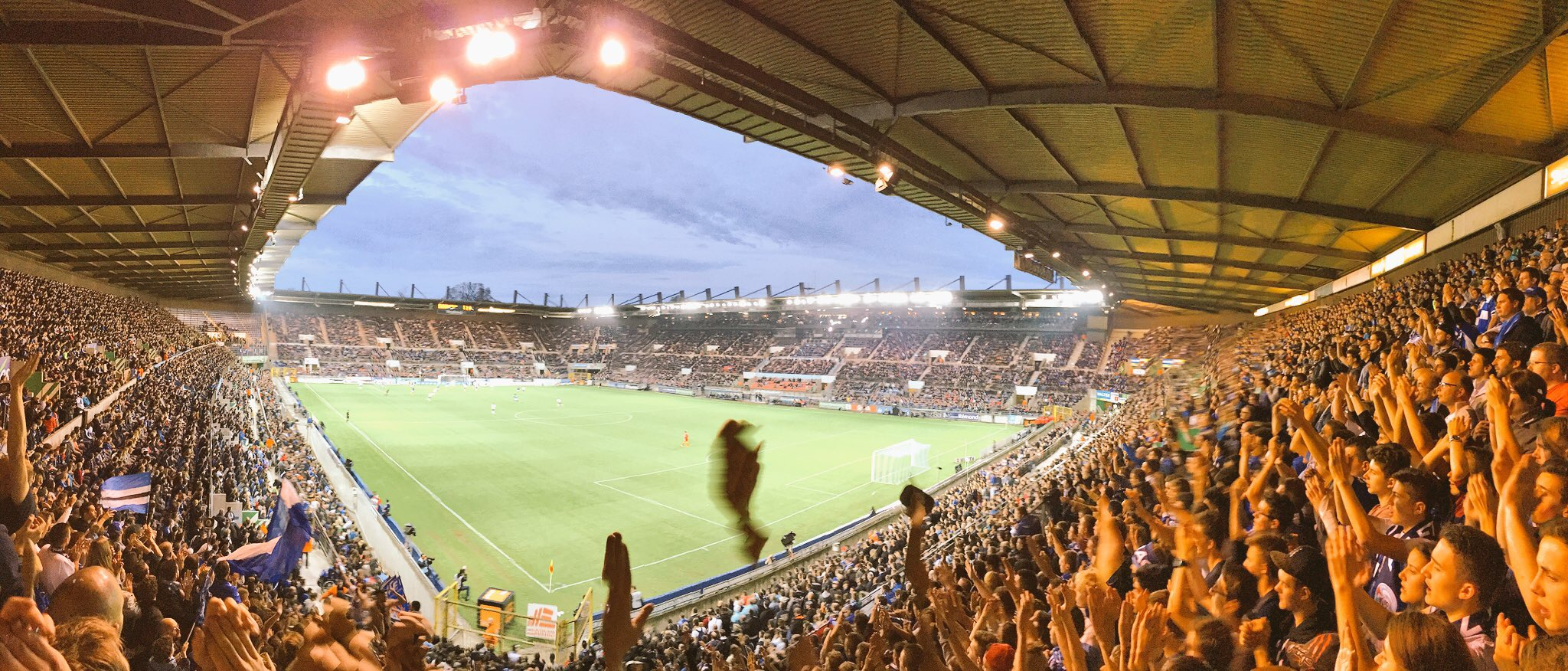
- Interactive map of Stade de la Meinau
- Location: 12, rue de l'Extenwoerth; Strasbourg, France
- Coordinates: 48°33′36″N 7°45′18″E
- Owner: Town of Strasbourg
- Operator: RC Strasbourg
- Capacity: 32,300
- Surface: Hybrid Grass
- Field size: 105 x 68 m

Construction
- Groundbreaking: 1906
- Opened: 1914
- Renovated: 1984
- Expanded: 1921, 1931, 1951, 1979–1984, 2022–2026

Tenant
- RC Strasbourg (1914–present)

The Stade de la Meinau (French pronunciation: [stad də la mɛno]), commonly known as "la Meinau", is a football stadium in Strasbourg, France. It is the home ground of RC Strasbourg and has also hosted international matches, including one game of the 1938 World Cup, two games of Euro 1984 and the final of the Cup Winners' Cup in 1988. La Meinau has also been used as a venue for concerts and a Mass by John Paul II in 1988. The stadium is owned by the Strasbourg municipality and is rented by the RC Strasbourg.

== History ==
On 1 April 1914, Strasbourg was still part of Germany following the Franco-Prussian War. RC Strasbourg, then called FC Neudorf, signed a 300 Mark lease to use the Haemmerlé Garten, essentially a pitch surrounded by the woods in the then mainly rural district of Meinau. This would eventually serve as the ground where the stadium was constructed. Between 1906 and 1914, the pitch had been used by another team, FC Frankonia, and several lawsuits were necessary to evict that team from the ground. Construction eventually proceeded and was completed in 1921 with a capacity of 30,000. During the 1938 FIFA World Cup, La Meinau hosted a first-round game that saw Brazil eliminate Poland 6–5 after extra-time thanks to a hat-trick by Leônidas who scored one of the first bicycle kicks in the history of football.

In the four decades that followed, the facility was left essentially untouched. When France won the right to host the European Championship with Strasbourg as a venue, La Meinau was rebuilt from the ground up at a cost of just over FRF 120 million. It became a compact, fully rectangular stadium with quarter-corners between the four main stands (North, South, West and East), not unlike Dortmund's Westfalenstadion. Inaugurated on April 18, 1984, two months before the Euro, La Meinau hosted a record 44,566 for the first-round match between West Germany and Portugal match (0–0). The stadium remained state-of-the-art through the 1980s and hosted the 1988 UEFA Cup Winners Cup final that saw K.V. Mechelen defeat Ajax Amsterdam 1–0.

After the tragic events of Heysel, Hillsborough and Furiani, safety regulations were reinforced, progressively limiting the number of standing places. This change severely affected La Meinau since the stadium had large standing-only terraces all around the pitch. Capacity dropped from the initial 45,000 to 26,000, all seated. Hence, in 1996, RC Strasbourg could not rely on a large attendance when they hosted AC Milan for the 1995–96 UEFA Cup. In 1993, La Meinau was considered as a strong potential candidate to host games for World Cup 1998 by Michel Platini, who organized the tournament, especially because of its proximity to Germany and Central Europe in general. However, at a time when the local team was performing erratically, the City of Strasbourg was unwilling to assume the cost of the works necessary to host the World Cup – estimated at FRF 200 million – citing other costly projects under way, especially the tram. (since Metz also declined an invitation to host the cup, there were no games in 1998 in the whole of north-eastern France).

La Meinau was last refurbished in 2001 and its current capacity for league games is 26,280. When France prepared its bid to host Euro 2016, Strasbourg came up again as a potential venue. However, RC Strasbourg had by then fallen into a steep sporting and financial decline that ultimately led to the liquidation of its professional section and a restart in the French fifth division. With no prospect of a profitable investment, the municipality withdrew from consideration as a host city and La Meinau was again left out of a major renovation and the north-east Grand Est and Bourgogne-Franche-Comté regions, with a population of 8 million, went without any active involvement in the event.

== Renovation ==
In May 2019, a €100m renovation project was announced, to increase the capacity to 32,300. Work was due to start in the summer of 2022, and initially projected to be completed in 2025. In January 2021, it was announced that the firm Populous had been selected as the lead architect of the project and that the updated design would focus on sustainability, utilizing sections of decommissioned Airbus A340 fuselages to create a sunshade for the renovated south stand. The expected project completion was updated to August 2026, and installation of the 196 upcycled fuselage panels began in late 2025. In December 2025, amidst ongoing refurbishment to the facility at-large and an updated budget of more than €180m, installation of the panels was paused until March 2026 when the remainder are expected to be acquired and fitted into place.

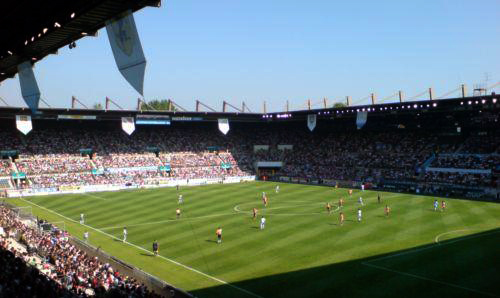
RC Strasbourg taking on Olympique de Marseille at La Meinau in the opening game of the 2007/8 Ligue 1 season

== Records ==
- Record attendance: 44,566 on 14 June 1984
14 June 1984
17:15

West Germany	0–0	Portugal
	Report

Attendance: 44,566
Referee: Romualdas Yushka (Soviet Union)

- Record attendance for a domestic league game: 39,033 on 20 November 1992
20 November 1992
20:00

RC Strasbourg	2–2	Olympique Marseille
Leboeuf 64'; Etamé 85'	Report	Bokšić 17'; Sauzée 49'

Attendance: 39,033
Referee: Lartigot

== France's national teams at La Meinau ==
The France national football team has played four games in Strasbourg.

6 November 1968
20:45

France	0–1	Norway
	(Report)	Iversen 67'

Attendance: 18,319
Referee: Francesco Francescon (Italy)

18 April 1984
20:45

France	1–0	West Germany
Genghini 79'	(Report)

Attendance: 39,978
Referee: Vincenzo Barbaresco (Italy)

29 May 1996
20:45

France	2–0	Finland
Loko 15'; Pedros 18'	(Report)

Attendance: 27,156
Referee: Edgar Steinborn (Germany)

1 September 2021
20:45

France	1–1	Bosnia and Herzegovina
Griezmann 40'	Report	Džeko 36'

Attendance: 21,754
Referee: Sandro Schärer (Switzerland)

The France women's national football team has played three games in Strasbourg.

15 April 1995
18:00

France	0–3	United States
	(Report)	Jennings-Gabarra 3'; Lilly 55'; Hamm 65'

Attendance: 19,535

20 April 2002
15:00

France	4–1	Czech Republic
Soubeyrand 5'; Pichon 31'; Mugneret-Béghé 39'; Blouin 49'	(Report)	Ščasná 90'

10 June 2021
20:55

France	1–0	Germany
Dali 30'	Report

Referee: Ivana Martinčić (Croatia)

The French national rugby union team has played one game in Strasbourg.

4 November 1989
20:00

France	15–32	Australia
Pen: Cambérabéro (4/4) 4', 18', 21', 41'; Drop: Cambérabéro 10'	(Report)	Tries: Horan 36', 79'; Williams 46'; Campese 64; Con: Lynagh (2/4) 46', 64'; Pen: Lynagh (4/4) 8', 13', 53', 56'

Attendance: 29,568
Referee: Burger (South Africa)

== Non-sport events ==
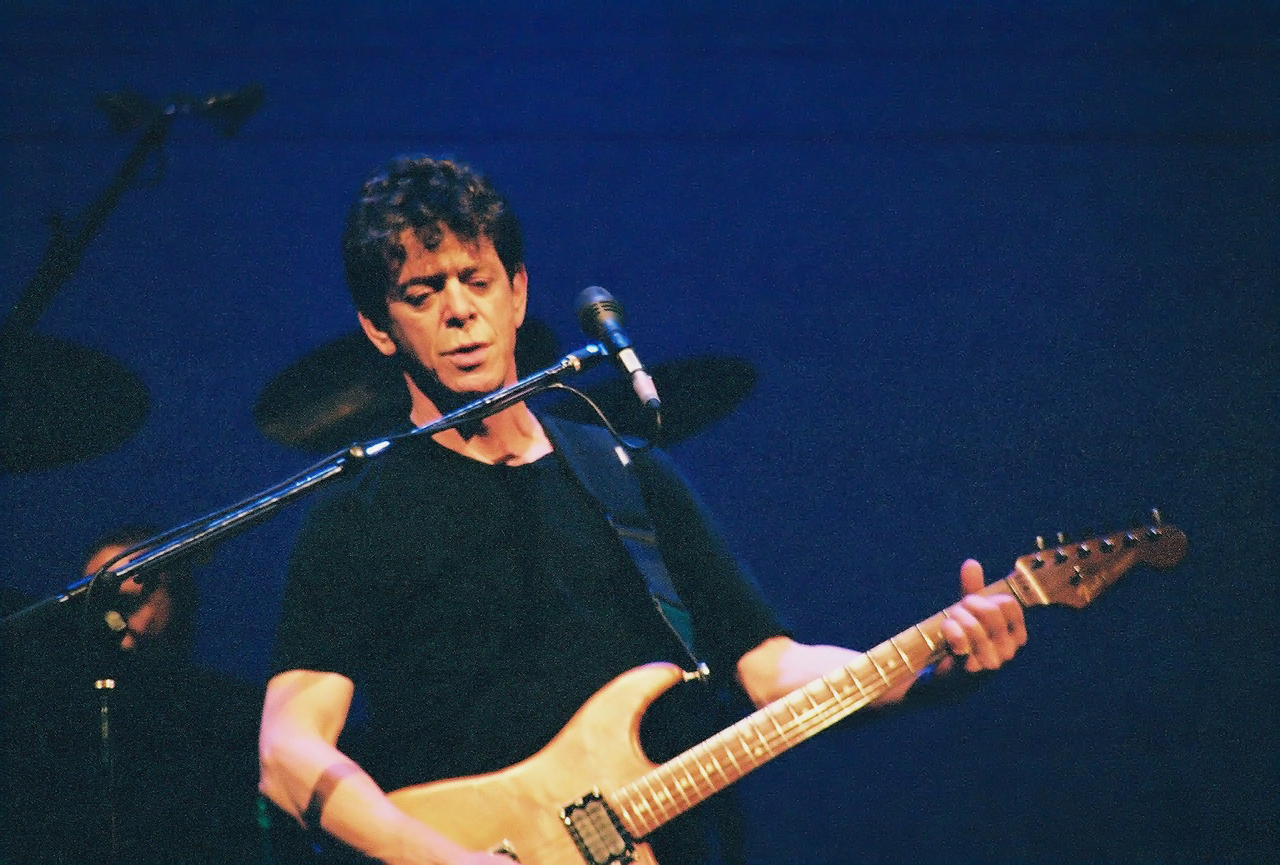
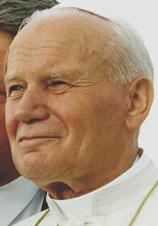
Lou Reed performed in 1993 and John Paul II visited in 1988

Date	Event
9 October 1988	Pope John Paul II mass On the occasion of Strasbourg's 2000th Anniversary
23 June 1993	U2 Concert; Supported by The Velvet Underground
9 September 1994	Pink Floyd Concert
22 June 2003	Johnny Hallyday Concert; Supported by Yannick Noah

Preceded by Spyros Louis Stadium; Athens	European Cup Winners' Cup; Final venue 1988	Succeeded by Wankdorf Stadium; Bern
