= Ryan Rodin =

French footballer (born 2006)

Personal information
- Date of birth: 2 March 2006 (age 20)
- Place of birth: Bourg-la-Reine, France
- Height: 1.94 m (6 ft 4 in)
- Position: Forward

Team information
- Current team: Auxerre
- Number: 31

Youth career
- 2011–2013: AS Meudon
- 2013–2016: FC Plessis-Robinson
- 2016–2017: FC Issy-les-Moulineaux
- 2017: ACBB
- 2017–2019: FC Issy-les-Moulineaux
- 2019–2022: Auxerre

Senior career*
Years	Team	Apps	(Gls)
2022–	Auxerre II	47	(14)
2025–	Auxerre	3	(0)

International career^{‡}
2022	France U16	2	(0)
- * Club domestic league appearances and goals as of 20 May 2026 ‡ National team caps and goals as of 13:52, 15 April 2026 (UTC)

Ryan Rodin (born 2 March 2006) is a French professional footballer who plays as a forward for Ligue 1 club Auxerre.

== Club career ==
Rodin is a product of the youth academies of the French clubs AS Meudon, FC Plessis-Robinson, FC Issy-les-Moulineaux and ACBB, before moving to Auxerre on 16 June 2019 on a 5-year youth contract to finish his development. He debuted with Auxerre's reserves in 2022, but suffered a knee injury that kept him off long-term, before resurging in 2025. On 4 June 2025, he signed his first professional contract with Auxerre until 2028.

== International career ==
Born in France, Rodin is of Martiniquais descent. He was called up to the France U16s in 2022.
