= Pascual Garrido =

Argentine footballer

Personal information
- Full name: Alberto Pascual Garrido
- Date of birth: 28 September 1974 (age 52)
- Place of birth: Buenos Aires, Argentina
- Height: 1.79 m (5 ft 10 in)
- Position: Left-back

Senior career*
Years	Team	Apps	(Gls)
1992–1996	Boca Juniors	1	(0)
1997–1998	Bastia	4	(0)
1998–1999	Triestina	6	(0)
1999–2000	Lleida	0	(0)
2000–2002	Dundee	28	(0)
2002	Deportes Rangers		
- * Club domestic league appearances and goals

Alberto Pascual Garrido (born 28 September 1974), known as Pascual Garrido, is an Argentine former professional footballer who played as a left-back.
