= Frank Verlaat =

Dutch footballer

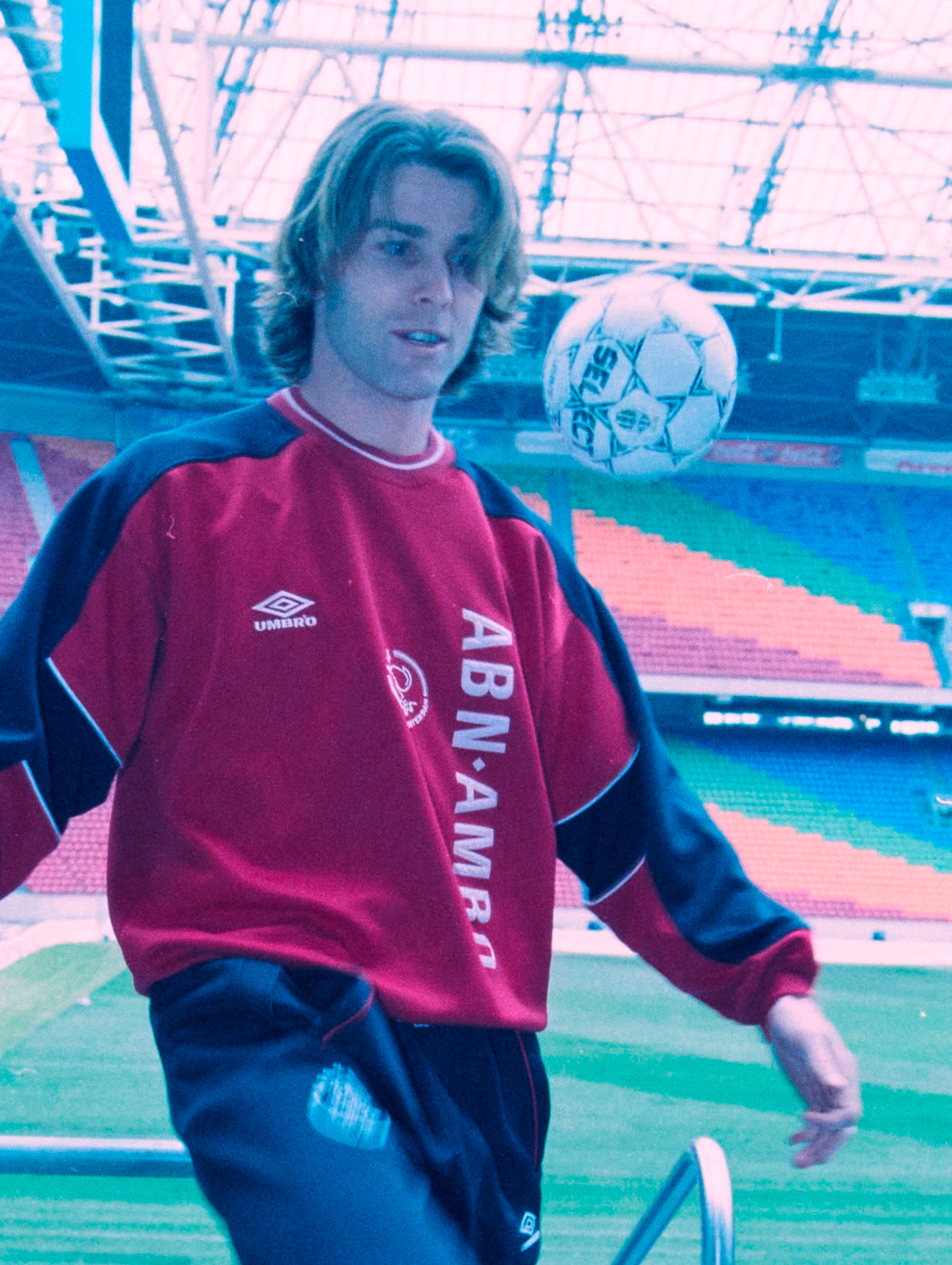
- Verlaat with Ajax in 2000

Personal information
- Date of birth: 5 March 1968 (age 58)
- Place of birth: Haarlem, Netherlands
- Height: 1.86 m (6 ft 1 in)
- Position: Defender

Senior career*
Years	Team	Apps	(Gls)
1986–1989	Ajax	17	(0)
1989–1992	Lausanne	104	(15)
1992–1995	Auxerre	109	(15)
1995–1999	VfB Stuttgart	104	(6)
1999–2000	Ajax	21	(3)
2000–2003	Werder Bremen	81	(5)
2003–2004	Austria Wien	19	(3)
2004–2007	Sturm Graz	87	(3)
Total		542	(50)

International career
1995	Netherlands	1	(0)
- * Club domestic league appearances and goals

Frank Verlaat (born 5 March 1968) is a Dutch former professional footballer who played as a defender.

He had a 21-year career throughout Europe, playing in the Netherlands, Switzerland, France, Germany and finishing his career in Austria. He earned one cap with the Netherlands national team.

== Career ==
Verlaat moved to Bundesliga club VfB Stuttgart from French side AJ Auxerre in 1995. For VfB Stuttgart, he made 104 appearances in the league, two in continental competitions and six in the DFB-Pokal.

Verlaat returned to former club Ajax in January 1999. The transfer fee was reported as DM8.5 million.

In summer 2000, Verlaat joined Bundesliga club Werder Bremen from Ajax on a three-year contract. The transfer fee paid to Ajax was reported as DM3.5 or 4 million.

== Personal life ==
Verlaat's son Jesper is also a footballer and has also played for Werder Bremen, albeit for the club's reserves.

== Honours ==
Ajax

- European Cup Winners’ Cup: 1986–87

Auxerre

- French Cup: 1993–94

VfB Stuttgart

- DFB-Pokal: 1996–97
