= Arnaud Duncker =

French footballer (born 1971)

Personal information
- Date of birth: 7 May 1971 (age 55)
- Place of birth: Valenciennes
- Position: Midfielder

Senior career*
Years	Team	Apps	(Gls)
1987–1994	Valenciennes		
1994–1998	Lille		
2000–2001	Valenciennes		
- * Club domestic league appearances and goals

Arnaud Duncker (born 7 May 1971) is a retired French football midfielder.
