= Gérald Baticle =

French football manager and former player (born 1969)

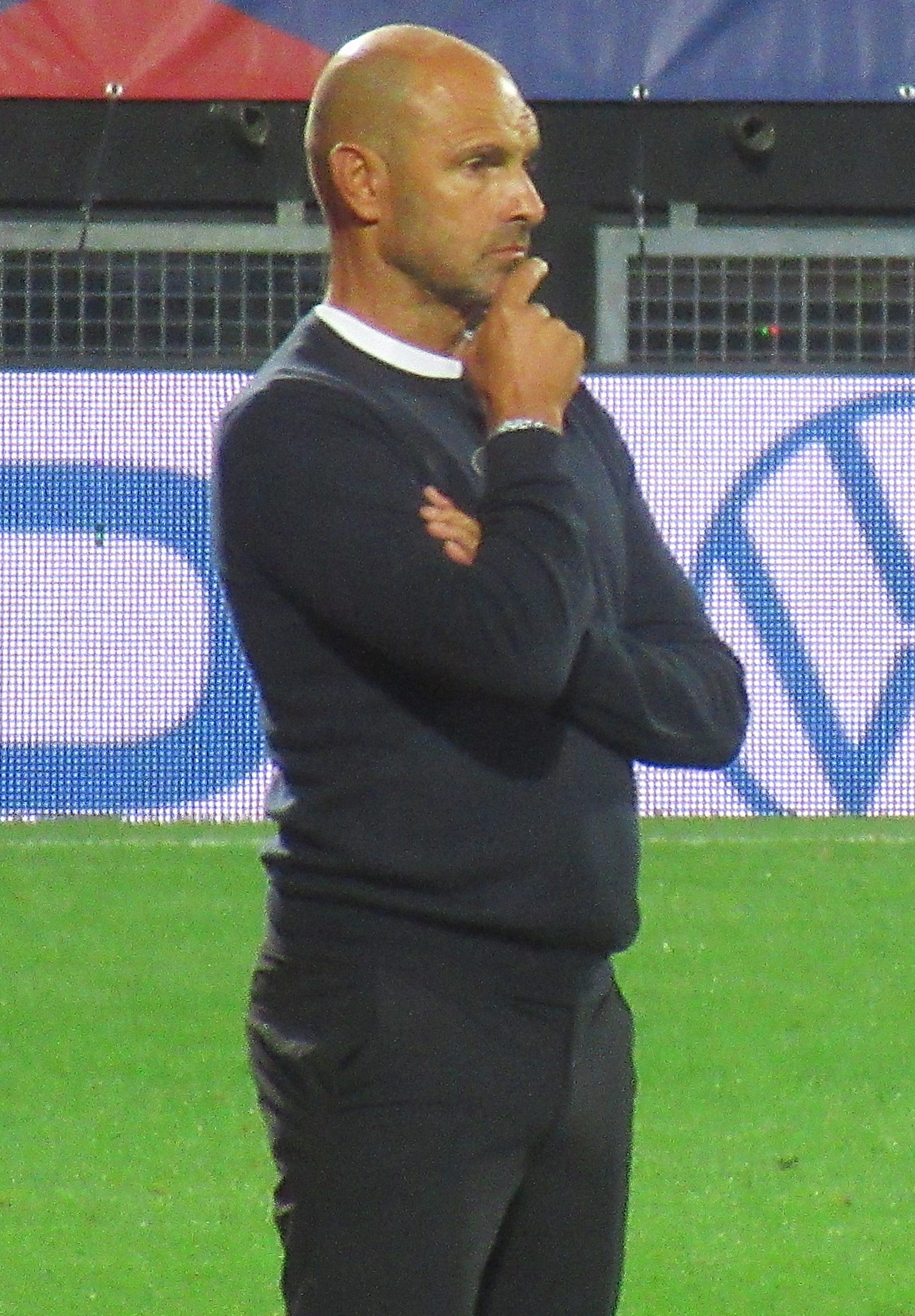

Personal information
- Full name: Gérald Edmond Louis Baticle
- Date of birth: 10 September 1969 (age 57)
- Place of birth: Amiens, Somme, France
- Height: 1.81 m (5 ft 11 in)
- Position: Striker

Youth career
- –1990: Amiens

Senior career*
Years	Team	Apps	(Gls)
1990–1991	Amiens		
1991–1995	Auxerre	109	(29)
1995–1998	Strasbourg	105	(21)
1998–1999	Auxerre	39	(5)
1999–2002	Metz	81	(24)
2002–2003	Troyes	30	(1)
2003–2004	Le Havre	31	(4)

Managerial career
- 2004–2008: Auxerre U19
- 2008–2009: Brest
- 2011: Lyon U19
- 2011–2021: Lyon (assistant)
- 2019: Lyon (interim)
- 2021–2022: Angers
- 2023–2024: France U21 (assistant)
- 2024: France Olympic (assistant)
- 2024–: France U21
- * Club domestic league appearances and goals

Gérald Edmond Louis Baticle (born 10 September 1969) is a French professional football manager and former player who played as a striker. He is the current coach of the France national under-21 football team.

== Playing career ==
Born in Amiens, Somme, Baticle started his professional career in his native Picardy region at Amiens but quickly attracted the attention of Guy Roux who recruited him at Auxerre. He played his first game in Division 1 on 19 September 1991 against Metz. In the 1992–93 season, he was the UEFA Cup's top goalscorer as Auxerre reached the semi-finals where they were edged out by Borussia Dortmund after a penalty shootout. A year later, Baticle scored one of Auxerre's goal during the final of the French cup where the AJA defeated Montpellier 3–0 to win its first national title. In the 1994–95 season, he had to face the concurrence of an emerging Lilian Laslandes for the sole striker post in Guy Roux's emblematic 4-3-3.

Baticle then chose to move to an ambitious Strasbourg side where he joined a team composed of Frank Leboeuf, Franck Sauzée and Aleksandr Mostovoi. He spent three seasons at Strasbourg and was a captain there after Leboeuf's departure in 1996. He was repositioned as an offensive midfielder by Jacky Duguépéroux and, in this position, was instrumental in Strasbourg's 1997 League cup triumph as well as the good UEFA Cup run the following season.

He was then back for a season and a half at Auxerre as a transition striker between world champion Stéphane Guivarc'h and the young Djibril Cissé. In December 1999, he was transferred to Metz where he enjoyed decent success as a striker for three years in a struggling team. When Metz was relegated, Baticle moved to Troyes for a season before ending his career in 2003–04 with Ligue 2 side Le Havre.

== Coaching career ==
Baticle was a successful youth coach for three seasons with Auxerre's under 18 team, reaching the final of the Coupe Gambardella in 2007. In October 2008, Pascal Janin was sacked from his post at Stade Brestois and it was rumoured that general manager Corentin Martins was eager to bring his former Auxerre teammate at Brest for the managing job but the move was at first opposed by Auxerre's president Jean-Claude Hamel. Ultimately, a compromise was found and Baticle joined Brest, winning his first game 4–0 against Bastia on 7 November 2008. He was fired in May 2009 and replaced by Alex Dupont.

On 22 December 2022, Baticle was sacked by Angers.

Having worked with the France national under-21 football team as an assistant under Thierry Henry's management, he was appointed as coach on 23 August 2024.

== Career statistics ==
Appearances and goals by club, season and competition
Club	Season	League			Cup (Note: Includes Coupe de France and Coupe de la Ligue.)		Continental (Note: Includes UEFA Cup, UEFA Cup Winners' Cup and UEFA Intertoto-Cup.)		Total	
Club	Season	Division	Apps	Goals	Apps	Goals	Apps	Goals	Apps	Goals
Auxerre	1991–92	Division 1	24	8	–		–		24	8
Auxerre	1992–93	Division 1	32	9	–		10	8	42	17
Auxerre	1993–94	Division 1	32	7	5	5	2	0	39	12
Auxerre	1994–95	Division 1	21	5	1	0	2	0	24	5
Auxerre	Total		109	29	6	5	14	8	129	42
Strasbourg	1995–96	Division 1	33	6	4	1	2	1	39	8
Strasbourg	1996–97	Division 1	38	7	8	3	4	2	50	12
Strasbourg	1997–98	Division 1	34	8	2	1	6	4	42	13
Strasbourg	Total		105	21	14	5	12	7	131	33
Auxerre	1998–99	Division 1	34	4	4	0	2	0	40	4
Auxerre	1999–00	Division 1	5	1	–		–		5	1
Auxerre	Total		39	5	4	0	2	0	45	5
Metz	1999–00	Division 1	14	5	4	2	–		18	7
Metz	2000–01	Division 1	34	15	2	1	–		36	16
Metz	2001–02	Division 1	33	4	2	1	–		35	5
Metz	Total		81	24	8	4	0	0	89	28
Troyes	2002–03	Ligue 1	30	1	2	0	–		32	1
Le Havre	2003–04	Ligue 2	31	4	–		–		31	4
Career total			395	84	34	14	28	15	457	113

== Managerial statistics ==
As of match played 17 November 2025

Managerial record by team and tenure
Team	From	To	Record								Ref.
Team	From	To	G	W	D	L	GF	GA	GD	Win %	Ref.
Angers	27 May 2021	22 December 2022	54	12	13	29	59	91	−32	22.22	
France U21	23 August 2024	present	18	11	5	2	47	20	+27	61.11	
Total			72	23	18	31	106	111	−5	31.94	—

== Honours ==
=== As a player ===
- Coupe de France: 1994
- UEFA Intertoto Cup: 1995
- Coupe de la Ligue: 1997

=== As a manager ===
- Coupe Gambardella runner-up: 2007
