= Bertrand Reuzeau =

French footballer (born 1966)

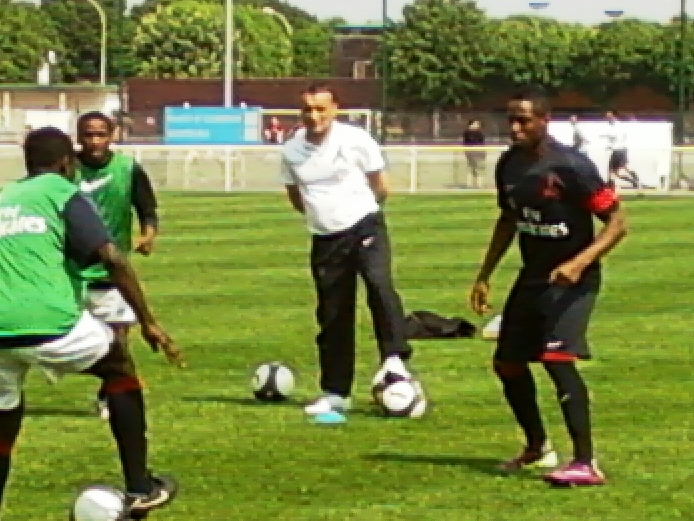
- Bertrand Reuzeau warms up his players before the PSG B - Sochaux B match on April 24, 2011.

Personal information
- Date of birth: 1 April 1966 (age 60)
- Place of birth: Mayenne
- Position: Midfielder

Senior career*
Years	Team	Apps	(Gls)
1984–1990	Stade Lavallois		
1990–1991	Lille OSC		
1991–1996	Montpellier HSC		
1996–1997	FC Sochaux-Montbéliard		

International career
- France under-21
- * Club domestic league appearances and goals

Bertrand Reuzeau (born 1 April 1966) is a retired French football midfielder.

== Honours ==
=== Player ===
Montpellier

- Coupe de la Ligue: 1991–92
