= Jean-Jacques Etamé =

Footballer (born 1966)

Personal information
- Date of birth: 23 November 1966 (age 59)
- Place of birth: Strasbourg, France
- Height: 1.77 m (5 ft 10 in)
- Position: Midfielder

Senior career*
Years	Team	Apps	(Gls)
1983–1985	Strasbourg B	50	(9)
1985–1989	Strasbourg	60	(10)
1989	Brest Armorique	17	(1)
1989–1990	Abbeville	18	(1)
1990–1993	Strasbourg	74	(12)
1993–1994	Lille	37	(5)
1994–1995	Caen	30	(3)
1995–1997	Cannes	57	(3)
1997–1998	Bastia	18	(1)
1998–1999	Saint-Louisienne		
1999–2000	US Cagnes-sur-Mer		
2000–2003	ASPV Strasbourg		

International career
	Cameroon	2	
- * Club domestic league appearances and goals

Jean-Jacques Etamé (born 23 November 1966) is a former professional footballer who played as a midfielder. Born in France, he played for the Cameroon national team, making two appearances.
