= Éric Mura =

French footballer (born 1963)

Personal information
- Date of birth: 23 January 1963 (age 63)
- Place of birth: Saint-Cyr-l'École, France
- Height: 1.73 m (5 ft 8 in)
- Position: Defender

Youth career
- Saint-Cyr
- Annecy
- FC Martigues
- AS Aix
- 1983–1985: Marseille

Senior career*
Years	Team	Apps	(Gls)
1985–1991	Marseille	30	(0)
1991–1993	Strasbourg	56	(3)
1993–1994	Bastia	11	(1)
1994–1995	Châteauroux		
1995	Vitrolles		
1995–1998	Calvi		
1998–2000	Olympique Alès	15	(0)
2000–2001	Olympique Noisy-le-Sec		
- * Club domestic league appearances and goals

Éric Mura (born 23 January 1963) is a French former professional footballer who played as a defender.

Mura was on the bench at the 1991 European Cup Final.
