= Marc Batta =

French former football referee

- Born: 1 November 1953 (age 72); Marseille, France
- Other occupation: Civil servant UEFA referee observer

Domestic
Years	League	Role
1989–2000	Ligue 1	Referee

International
Years	League	Role
1990–1998	FIFA–listed	Referee

Marc Batta (born 1 November 1953) is a French former football referee.

== Career ==
Born in Marseille, Batta reached FIFA international status in 1990. He was namely in charge of the 1993–94 Coupe de France final, also directing the first leg of the 1996–97 UEFA Cup decisive match between FC Schalke 04 and Inter Milan.

In national team competitions, Batta was present at the UEFA Euro 1996 and the 1998 FIFA World Cup tournaments, refereeing two games in the latter. During the qualification group match between Germany and Portugal (1-1 draw), with Portugal leading after 71 minutes, Batta controversially sent off Rui Costa while he was being subbed off.

In July 2004 Batta succeeded Michel Vautrot as head of referees in the French Football Federation, remaining in the position for four years. On 1 August 2012, he took up the equivalent post with the Romanian Football Federation.

== Record ==
=== Major national team competition ===
UEFA Euro 1996 – England
Date	Match	Venue	Location	Round	Result	Yellow cards	Red cards
16 June 1996	Croatia – Denmark	Hillsborough Stadium	Sheffield	Group stage	3–0	3	0
22 June 1996	Spain – England	Wembley Stadium	London	Quarter-finals	0–0 (2–4 p)	4	0
1998 FIFA World Cup – France
Date	Match	Venue	Location	Round	Result	Yellow cards	Red cards
22 June 1998	Romania – England	Stadium de Toulouse	Toulouse	Group stage	2–0	3	0
27 June 1998	Brazil – Chile	Parc des Princes	Paris	Round of 16	4–1	4	0

Preceded by Rémi Harrel	Coupe de France Final 1994; Marc Batta	Succeeded by Philippe Leduc
Preceded by (Belarus) Vadim Zhuk	UEFA Cup Final 1997 (France) Marc Batta	Succeeded by (Spain) José García Aranda
Preceded by (England) David Elleray	UEFA Super Cup 1998 (France) Marc Batta	Succeeded by (Poland) Ryszard Wójcik
Preceded by (Romania) Marcel Lică	Cupa României Final 1999 (France) Marc Batta	Succeeded by (Romania) Sorin Corpodean
