= AJ Auxerre =

Association football club in Auxerre, France

Auxerre
- Full name: Association de la Jeunesse Auxerroise
- Nickname: Les Ajaïstes
- Short name: AJ Auxerre, AJA
- Founded: 29 December 1905; 120 years ago
- Stadium: Stade de l'Abbé-Deschamps
- Capacity: 18,541
- Owner: James Zhou
- President: Baptiste Malherbe
- Head coach: Will Still
- League: Ligue 1
- 2025–26: Ligue 1, 15th of 18
- Website: www.aja.fr
Home colours	Away colours	Third colours

Association de la Jeunesse Auxerroise (French pronunciation: [asɔsjɑsjɔ̃ də la ʒœnɛs osɛʁwaz]), commonly known as AJ Auxerre or by the abbreviation AJA, is a professional football club based in Auxerre, Bourgogne-Franche-Comté, France. The club currently competes in Ligue 1, the top division of French football. Auxerre plays its home matches at the Stade de l'Abbé-Deschamps, on the banks of the Yonne River. The team is managed by Will Still.

Auxerre was founded in 1905 and made its debut in the first division of French football in the 1980–81 season, remaining in the top flight until the 2011–12 season. The club has won the Ligue 1 title once, in the 1995–96 season. Two years prior, Auxerre achieved its first major honour by winning the Coupe de France in 1994 in a 3–0 victory over Montpellier. The club has since added three more Coupe de France titles, which ties the club for the fifth-best standing among teams who have won the trophy.

Auxerre has produced several notable players during its existence. The club has most notably served as a springboard for several prominent French football players such as Eric Cantona, Laurent Blanc, Stéphane Guivarc'h, Philippe Mexès, Basile Boli, and Djibril Cissé, among others, who all became French internationals, with Blanc playing on the teams that won the 1998 FIFA World Cup and UEFA Euro 2000. Guivarc'h, Bernard Diomède and Lionel Charbonnier were the three footballers from Auxerre who were world champions in 1998. From 1961 to 2005, the club was predominantly coached by Guy Roux. This included an uninterrupted period when Roux was in charge for 36 years between 1964 and 2000.

== History ==
The club Association de la Jeunesse Auxerroise was founded in 1905, by the abbot Ernest Abbé Deschamps. The club success, becoming a force in the Catholic league F.G.S.P.F. In 1908, the club even reached the F.G.S.P.F. French Championship final, losing 8–1 however. At the end of the First World War, the club was expelled from its ground. Father Deschamps acquired several pieces of land along the Yonne on the Vaux road, which later formed the Abbé Deschamps Stadium.

Auxerre made its first steps in Division 1 on 24 July 1980 against Bastia in Toulon. Auxerre lost the match 2–0. On 20 November 1980, Andrzej Szarmach signed for Auxerre having received consent from the Polish Football Association. He started two days later at home against Lyon and scored the first of his ninety-four goals in Division 1. AJA's first season in Division 1 was remarkable for two particular performances: on 13 December 1980, at Parc des Princes against Paris Saint-Germain (3–2), and then on 7 April 1981, at Stade Marcel-Saupin against Nantes for a 1–0 win, notable as Nantes had not lost a home game for five years and 92 games (between 15 April 1976 and 7 April 1981). In the next two seasons, AJA finished fifteenth and eighth respectively.

During the 1983–84 season, AJA climbed for the first time onto the podium in finishing third. Patrice Garande finished top scorer with twenty-one goals. A few weeks later, Garande won the gold medal at the Olympics in Los Angeles with the French Olympic football team while Joël Bats and Jean-Marc Ferreri were part of the victorious French team at UEFA Euro 1984. That summer, Auxerre recruited Michel N'Gom. An international prospect, he left Paris Saint-Germain. During pre-season, he scored five goals in ten games. On the last weekend before the start of the season, he visited his former teammates in Paris. He died following a traffic accident on 12 August 1984. To pay tribute, one of the stands at Abbé Deschamps bears his name. The 1984–1985 season saw Auxerre in European competition for the first time in its history by participating in the UEFA Cup, albeit with an unfavourable first round draw with Sporting Clube de Portugal. On 19 September 1984 at Estádio José Alvalade, AJA took its bow in European football with a 2–0 defeat. The return leg took place on 3 October 1984. AJA managed to retrieve the two goal deficit with a double by Szarmach, but eventually succumbed with two goals in extra time. However, by virtue of the victory of Monaco in the Coupe de France, AJA also qualified for the UEFA Cup the year after.

The 1985 offseason saw Joël Bats join Paris Saint-Germain. Auxerre recruited Bruno Martini as his successor. In the UEFA Cup, AJA were drawn against Milan. In the first leg, Auxerre won 3–1. Both teams missed a penalty and Paolo Maldini made his debut in European competition. In the return match, AJA lost 3–0 and was therefore eliminated. Seventh in the league and quarter-finalist in the French cup, AJA did not manage a third straight season in Europe. Auxerre finished fourth in 1986–1987, and was once again eliminated in the first round of the UEFA Cup the following season with a 2–0 away defeat to Panathinaikos too much to overcome in the return leg (which Auxerre won 3–2). The 1988–89 season saw AJA finish fifth in the league and reach the semi-finals of the Coupe de France before elimination by Marseille, the future winner of the event. With fifth place in the league, AJA made the UEFA Cup and there made its first decent run. During the preliminary round, AJA managed its first victory. Beaten 0–1 at home by Dinamo Zagreb, it registered 3–1 in Yugoslavia and qualified for the first round proper. Auxerre beat successively Albanians Apolonia Fier, Finns RoPS and Olympiacos of Greece before being eliminated in the quarterfinals by Fiorentina. In parallel with this, AJA managed sixth place in the league. During the summer of 1990, the AJA sold Basile Boli and recruited Enzo Scifo, Alain Roche and Zbigniew Kaczmarek. Auxerre finished in third place after leading the championship for two weeks.

In 1991–92, Auxerre was eliminated in the second round of the UEFA Cup by Liverpool and then finished fourth in Division 1. That summer, the AJA sold Alain Roche and Jean-Marc Ferreri while recruiting Frank Verlaat and Gérald Baticle. Auxerre then journeyed again into UEFA. Auxerre eliminated Lokomotiv Plovdiv and the newly formed Copenhagen. In the third round, AJA eliminated Standard Liège. In the quarterfinals, AJA faced Ajax, the defending champion and undefeated in the European Cup for two years. Before facing Ajax, Auxerre had suffered five consecutive league defeats. Auxerre managed a 4–2 home win. In the second leg, Ajax could only manage a 1–0 win and so Auxerre had qualified for the semi-finals, to face Borussia Dortmund. In the first leg in Germany, AJA lost 2–0. A fiercely contested second leg levelled the aggregate score, but Auxerre were finally eliminated on penalties.

While finishing sixth in the championship, Auxerre again qualified for the UEFA Cup after the VA-OM case. But unlike the epic run of the previous season, AJA was eliminated in the first round by Tenerife. AJA made progress in the league, with a third-place finish, but notably captured its first major trophy, the French cup. Having made it past the lower division teams in the early rounds, AJA eliminated Nantes in the semifinals before winning 3-0 at the Parc des Princes in the final against Montpellier. The following season, Auxerre finished fourth in the league and was a quarter-finalist of the Cup Winners' Cup: Auxerre was eliminated by Arsenal in the Abbe-Deschamps (1–0) having achieved a 1–1 draw at Highbury.

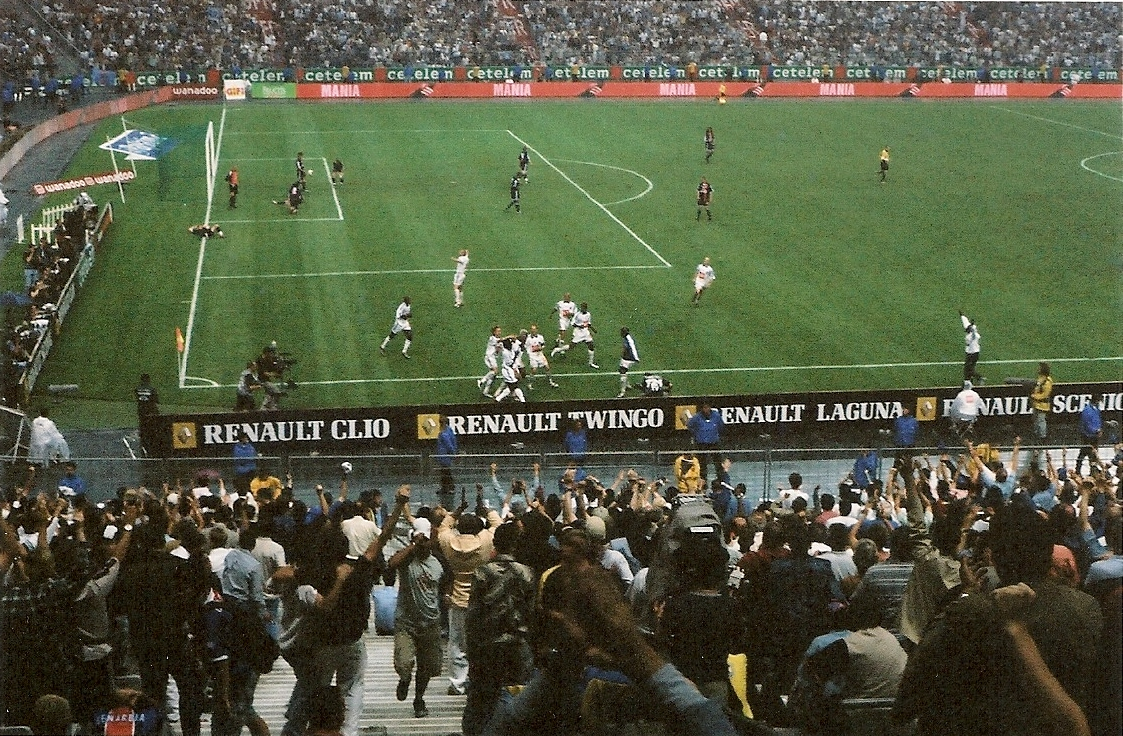
Auxerre players and fans celebrate their 2003 Coupe de France final victory.

During the 1995–96 season, the club won Division 1 for the first time in their history, and also won the Coupe de France.

On 13 May 2012, Auxerre's 32-year stay in the top division came to an end after a 3–0 away defeat at the hands of Marseille. The following season, Auxerre finished a disappointing ninth place along with a goal difference of −2. The next season was no better for AJA, after they finished a lowly 16th position. Although not resulting in promotion, the 2014–15 Ligue 2 season was better for the Burgundy based side, as they finished ninth in Ligue 2 and finishing runners-up in the 2015 Coupe de France final after losing to Paris Saint-Germain at the Stade de France in front of an attendance of 80,000. The 2018–19 season was Auxerre's seventh consecutive in the Ligue 2. In the 2020–21 Ligue 2 season, the Auxerrois would achieve their best finish in the second tier since their relegation with a 6th-place finish, although they were positioned within the top five required for at least the playoffs at the end of 17 of the 38 game weeks. In the 2021–22 Ligue 2 season, AJA were finally promoted back to Ligue 1 after ten years, after a penalty shoot-out win against Saint-Etienne in the Ligue 1 promotion/relegation play-offs. After just one season in Ligue 1, Auxerre were relegated back to Ligue 2 after losing on the final day against Lens. Auxerre were one point clear of Nantes, but with Nantes securing a victory over already relegated Angers it meant Auxerre were the final team relegated. On 11 May 2024, Auxerre secure promotion to Ligue 1 for the 2024–25 season, after 1-1 draw against Amiens, champions of Ligue 2 in 2023–24, and returned to the top tier after a one year absence.

== Players ==
=== Current squad ===
As of 15 September 2026

Note: Flags indicate national team as defined under FIFA eligibility rules; some limited exceptions apply. Players may hold more than one non-FIFA nationality.

No.	Pos.	Nation	Player
1	GK	FRA	Paul Nardi
3	FW	GLP	Rémy Labeau Lascary (on loan from Lens)
4	DF	COD	Axel Tuanzebe
5	MF	FRA	Kévin Danois (captain)
8	MF	FRA	Naouirou Ahamada
9	FW	ENG	Cameron Archer (on loan from Southampton)
11	FW	NED	Eros Maddy
13	DF	FRA	Telli Siwe
15	DF	CGO	Christ Makosso
17	MF	FRA	Pierre Ekwah (on loan from Saint-Étienne)
18	MF	SEN	Assane Dioussé
19	FW	CMR	Danny Namaso
20	DF	CIV	Sinaly Diomandé
22	DF	NOR	Fredrik Oppegård
23	GK	MTN	Mamadou Diop
24	DF	SUI	Bryan Okoh

No.	Pos.	Nation	Player
27	DF	SEN	Lamine Sy
28	MF	FRA	Romain Faivre (on loan from Bournemouth)
29	DF	GHA	Marvin Senaya
31	FW	FRA	Ryan Rodin
32	FW	CMR	Rayan Mandengue
34	MF	FRA	Lamfia Dioubaté
35	DF	FRA	Elikya Legros
36	MF	FRA	Tidiane Devernois
37	GK	FRA	Louis Mezerette
45	DF	FRA	Salimou Danfakha
46	MF	BEL	Arthur Piedfort
49	FW	CHN	Wei Xiangxin
77	MF	CIV	Aristide Zossou
92	DF	CIV	Clément Akpa
93	DF	CIV	Sékou Fofana

=== Out on loan ===
Note: Flags indicate national team as defined under FIFA eligibility rules; some limited exceptions apply. Players may hold more than one non-FIFA nationality.

No.	Pos.	Nation	Player
—	GK	FRA	Théo De Percin (on loan to Bastia until 30 June 2027)
—	DF	CHI	Francisco Sierralta (on loan to Piast Gliwice until 30 June 2027)
—	MF	CIV	Lasso Coulibaly (on loan to Viborg until 30 June 2027)

No.	Pos.	Nation	Player
—	FW	CAN	Theo Bair (at Bolton Wanderers until 30 June 2027)
—	FW	HAI	Josué Casimir (at Dynamo Moscow until 30 June 2027)

=== Notable players ===
Below is the starting 11 of historic football players who have played at Auxerre in league and international competition since the club's foundation in 1905 as voted by the club's supporters.

- Khalilou Fadiga
- Bruno Martini
- Basile Boli
- Philippe Mexès
- Bacary Sagna
- Enzo Scifo
- Jean-Alain Boumsong
- Abou Diaby
- Yann Lachuer
- Djibril Cissé
- Eric Cantona
- Andrzej Szarmach
- Fabien Cool
- Yaya Sanogo
- Joël Bats
- Daniel Niculae

== Management ==
- Owner: James Zhou
- President: Yunjie Zhou
- Director of Youth: Gao Linfang
- Director of Football: Li Guoqing
- Head coach: Will Still
- Assistant coach: Nicolas Still, Jean-Alain Boumsong, Djibril Cissé, Cyril Jeunechamp
- Goalkeeper coach: Simon Pouplin
- Strength and conditioning coach: Thomas Wilzius
- Performance manager: Barthélémy Delecroix
- Video analyst: Clément Lemaitre, Joackim Cajado
- Doctor: Cédric Pleux, Antoine Moreno
- Physiotherapist: Jérémy Cobault
- Team manager: Christophe Grosso
- Kit manager: Sébastien Barassin

=== Coaching history ===
Dates	Name	Notes
1946–47	(France) Pierre Grosjean	Auxerre's first official coach.
1947–48	(France) Jean Pastel	
1948–50	(France) Jacques Boulard; Bruneau	
1950–52	(France) Georges Hatz	
1952–53	(France) Marc Olivier	
1953–55	(France) M. Pignault	
1955–56	(France) Pierre Meunier	
1956–58	(France) Jacques Boulard	First manager to manage the club twice.
1958–59	Joseph Holmann	First manager from outside France to coach the team.
1959–61	Christian Di Orio	
1961–62	(France) Guy Roux	
1962–64	Jean-Claude Gagneux; Jacques Chevallier	
1964–2000	(France) Guy Roux	Led the club to its first league and Coupe de France title.
2000–01	Daniel Rolland	
2000–05	(France) Guy Roux	First manager to serve three stints at the club. Won two Coupe de France titles.
2001–02	(France) Alain Fiard	Served in interim role due to Roux taking a leave of absence due to coronary artery bypass surgery.
2005–06	(France) Jacques Santini	
2006–11	(France) Jean Fernandez	
2011–12	(France) Laurent Fournier	
2012	(France) Jean-Guy Wallemme	
2012–14	(France) Bernard Casoni	
2014–16	(France) Jean-Luc Vannuchi	
2016	(Romania) Viorel Moldovan	
2016–17	(France) Cédric Daury	
2017	(France) Francis Gillot	
2018–19	(Uruguay) Pablo Correa	
2019	(France) Cédric Daury	Interim until end of 2018–19 season.
2019–22	(France) Jean-Marc Furlan	
2022–2026	(France) Christophe Pélissier	
2026–present	(England) Will Still	

== Honours ==
=== Domestic ===
==== League ====
- Ligue 1
  - Champions: 1995–96
- Ligue 2
  - Winners: 1979–80, 2023–24
- Division d'Honneur (Burgundy)
  - Winners: 1970
- FGSPF Championnat
  - Runners-up: 1909
- FGSPF Burgundy Championnat
  - Champions: 1906, 1907, 1908, 1909, 1910, 1911, 1912, 1913, 1914

==== Cups ====
- Coupe de France
  - Winners: 1993–94, 1995–96, 2002–03, 2004–05
  - Runners-up: 1978–79, 2014–15

=== International ===
- UEFA Intertoto Cup
  - Winners: 1997, 2006 (joint winner)
  - Runners-up: 2000
- Coppa delle Alpi
  - Champions: 1985, 1987

== European record ==
=== UEFA competitions ===
AJ Auxerre was founded in 1905 and made its debut in UEFA competitions in the 1984–85 season.

Season	Competition	Round	Club	Home	Away	Aggregate / position
1984–85	UEFA Cup	First round	(Portugal) Sporting CP	2–2 (a.e.t.)	0–2	2–4
1985–86	UEFA Cup	First round	(Italy) AC Milan	3–1	0–3	3–4
1987–88	UEFA Cup	First round	(Greece) Panathinaikos	3–2	0–2	3–4
1989–90	UEFA Cup	Preliminary round	(Socialist Federal Republic of Yugoslavia) Dinamo Zagreb	0–1	3–1	3–2
1989–90	UEFA Cup	First round	(Albania) Apolonia Fier	5–0	3–0	8–0
1989–90	UEFA Cup	Second round	(Finland) RoPS	3–0	5–0	8–0
1989–90	UEFA Cup	Third round	(Greece) Olympiacos	0–0	1–1	1–1 (a)
1989–90	UEFA Cup	Quarter-finals	(Italy) Fiorentina	0–1	0–1	0–2
1991–92	UEFA Cup	First round	(Denmark) Ikast FS	5–1	1–0	6–1
1991–92	UEFA Cup	Second round	(England) Liverpool	2–0	0–3	2–3
1992–93	UEFA Cup	First round	(Bulgaria) Lokomotiv Plovdiv	7–1	2–2	9–3
1992–93	UEFA Cup	Second round	(Denmark) Copenhagen	5–0	2–0	7–0
1992–93	UEFA Cup	Third round	(Belgium) Standard Liège	2–1	2–2	4–3
1992–93	UEFA Cup	Quarter-finals	(Netherlands) Ajax	4–2	0–1	4–3
1992–93	UEFA Cup	Semi-finals	(Germany) Borussia Dortmund	2–0 (a.e.t.)	0–2	2–2 (5–6 p)
1993–94	UEFA Cup	First round	(Spain) CD Tenerife	0–1	2–2	2–3
1994–95	UEFA Cup Winners' Cup	First round	Croatia Zagreb	3–0	1–3	4–3
1994–95	UEFA Cup Winners' Cup	Second round	(Turkey) Beşiktaş	2–0	2–2	4–2
1994–95	UEFA Cup Winners' Cup	Quarter-finals	(England) Arsenal	0–1	1–1	1–2
1995–96	UEFA Cup	First round	(Norway) Viking FK	1–0	1–1	2–1
1995–96	UEFA Cup	Second round	(England) Nottingham Forest	0–1	0–0	0–1
1996–97	UEFA Champions League	Group A	(Netherlands) Ajax	0–1	2–1	2–2
1996–97	UEFA Champions League	Group A	(Switzerland) Grasshoppers	1–0	1–3	2–3
1996–97	UEFA Champions League	Group A	(Scotland) Rangers	2–1	2–1	1st
1996–97	UEFA Champions League	Quarter-finals	(Germany) Borussia Dortmund	0–1	1–3	1–4
1997	UEFA Intertoto Cup	Group 3	(Switzerland) Lausanne-Sport	1–1	—	—
1997	UEFA Intertoto Cup	Group 3	(Belgium) Antwerp	5–0	—	—
1997	UEFA Intertoto Cup	Group 3	(Cyprus) Nea Salamina	—	10–1	—
1997	UEFA Intertoto Cup	Group 3	(Northern Ireland) Ards	—	3–0	1st
1997	UEFA Intertoto Cup	Semi-finals	(Russia) Torpedo Moscow	3–0	1–4	4–4 (a)
1997	UEFA Intertoto Cup	Final	(Germany) MSV Duisburg	2–0	0–0	2–0
1997–98	UEFA Cup	First round	(Spain) Deportivo de La Coruña	0–0	2–1	2–1
1997–98	UEFA Cup	Second round	(Greece) OFI Crete	3–1	2–3	5–4
1997–98	UEFA Cup	Third round	(Netherlands) FC Twente	2–0	1–0	3–0
1997–98	UEFA Cup	Quarter-finals	(Italy) Lazio	2–2	0–1	2–3
1998	UEFA Intertoto Cup	Third round	(Spain) Espanyol	1–1	0–1	1–2
2000	UEFA Intertoto Cup	Second round	(Norway) Stabæk	3–0	2–0	5–0
2000	UEFA Intertoto Cup	Third round	(Russia) Rostselmash Rostov	3–1	2–0	5–1
2000	UEFA Intertoto Cup	Semi-finals	(Germany) VfL Wolfsburg	1–1	2–1 (a.e.t.)	3–2
2000	UEFA Intertoto Cup	Final	(Germany) VfB Stuttgart	0–2	1–1	1–3
2002–03	UEFA Champions League	Third qualifying round	(Portugal) Boavista	0–0	1–0	1–0
2002–03	UEFA Champions League	Group A	(Netherlands) PSV Eindhoven	0–0	0–3	0–3
2002–03	UEFA Champions League	Group A	(Germany) Borussia Dortmund	1–0	1–2	2–2
2002–03	UEFA Champions League	Group A	(England) Arsenal	0–1	2–1	3rd
2002–03	UEFA Cup	Third round	(Spain) Real Betis	2–0	0–1	2–1
2002–03	UEFA Cup	Fourth round	(England) Liverpool	0–1	0–2	0–3
2003–04	UEFA Cup	First round	(Switzerland) Neuchâtel Xamax	1–0	1–0	2–0
2003–04	UEFA Cup	Second round	(Netherlands) FC Utrecht	4–0	0–0	4–0
2003–04	UEFA Cup	Third round	(Greece) Panathinaikos	0–0	1–0	1–0
2003–04	UEFA Cup	Fourth round	(Netherlands) PSV Eindhoven	1–1	0–3	1–4
2004–05	UEFA Cup	First round	(Denmark) AaB	2–0	1–1	3–1
2004–05	UEFA Cup	Group F	(Austria) Grazer AK	0–0	—	—
2004–05	UEFA Cup	Group F	(Netherlands) AZ	—	0–2	—
2004–05	UEFA Cup	Group F	(Poland) Amica Wronki	5–1	—	—
2004–05	UEFA Cup	Group F	(Scotland) Rangers	—	2–0	2nd
2004–05	UEFA Cup	Round of 32	(Netherlands) Ajax	3–1	0–1	3–2
2004–05	UEFA Cup	Round of 16	(France) Lille OSC	0–0	1–0	1–0
2004–05	UEFA Cup	Quarter-finals	(Russia) CSKA Moscow	2–0	0–4	2–4
2005–06	UEFA Cup	First round	(Bulgaria) Levski Sofia	2–1	0–1	2–2 (a)
2006	UEFA Intertoto Cup	Third round	(Romania) Farul Constanța	4–1	0–1	4–2
2006–07	UEFA Cup	Second qualifying round	(Serbia) OFK Beograd	5–1	0–1	5–2
2006–07	UEFA Cup	First round	(Croatia) Dinamo Zagreb	3–1	2–1	5–2
2006–07	UEFA Cup	Group A	(Israel) Maccabi Haifa	—	1–3	—
2006–07	UEFA Cup	Group A	(Scotland) Rangers	2–2	—	—
2006–07	UEFA Cup	Group A	(Serbia) Partizan	—	4–1	—
2006–07	UEFA Cup	Group A	(Italy) Livorno	0–1	—	4th
2010–11	UEFA Champions League	Play-off round	(Russia) Zenit Saint Petersburg	2–0	0–1	2–1
2010–11	UEFA Champions League	Group G	(Italy) AC Milan	0–2	0–2	0–4
2010–11	UEFA Champions League	Group G	(Spain) Real Madrid	0–1	0–4	0–5
2010–11	UEFA Champions League	Group G	(Netherlands) Ajax	2–1	1–2	4th

== Statistics ==
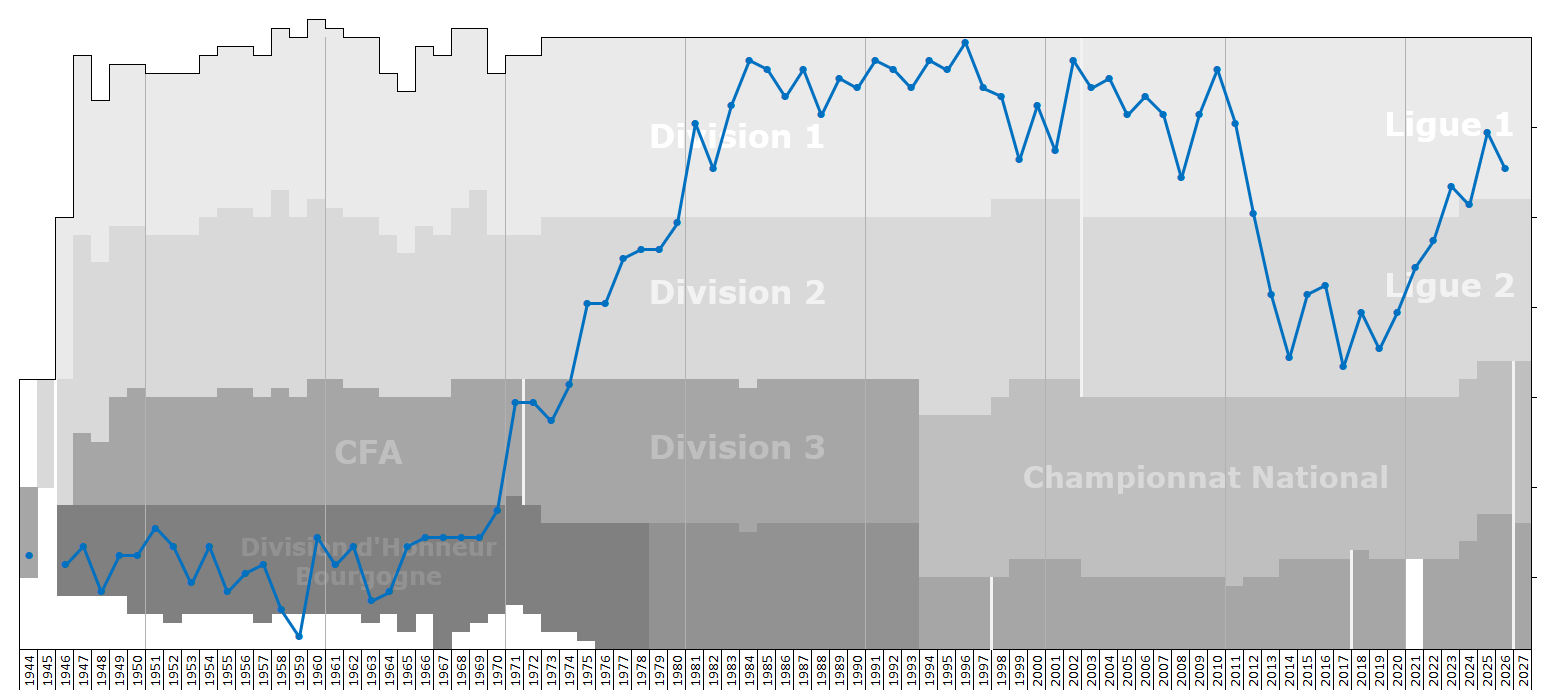
Historical league performance chart of AJ Auxerre

=== Latest seasons ===
Season		Pos.	Cup	League Cup	Europe		Other Comp.	Notes
1990–91	1D	3rd						
1991–92	1D	4th			UC	2nd round		
1992–93	1D	6th			UC	Semi-final		
1993–94	1D	3rd	Winner		UC	2nd round		
1994–95	1D	4th		Last 16				
1995–96	1D	1st	Winner	Quarter-final	UC	2nd round		
1996–97	1D	6th		Last 16	UCL	Quarter-final	TDC	
1997–98	1D	7th		Semi-final	UC	Quarter-final	Intertoto	
1998–99	1D	14th		Quarter-final		Intertoto		
1999–2000	1D	8th						
2000–01	1D	13th	Quarter-final	Quarter-final		Intertoto		
2001–02	1D	3rd	Last 32	Quarter-final				
2002–03	1D	6th	Winner	Last 16	UCL	Group stage		
2003–04	1D	4th	Quarter-final	Semi-final	UC	4th round	TDC	
2004–05	1D	8th	Winner	Quarter-final	UC	Quarter-final		
2005–06	1D	6th		Quarter-final	UC	1st round	TDC	
2006–07	1D	8th		Quarter-final	UC	Group stage	Intertoto	
2007–08	1D	15th	Last 16	Semi-final				
2008–09	1D	8th	Last 32	Quarter-final				
2009–10	1D	3rd	Quarter-final	Quarter-final				
2010–11	1D	9th	Last 32	Semi-final	UCL	Group stage		
2011–12	1D	20th	Last 16	Semi-final				
2012–13	2D	9th	7th round	Quarter-final				
2013–14	2D	16th	Quarter-final	Quarter-final				
2014–15	2D	9th	Runner-up	3rd round				
2015–16	2D	8th		Last 16				
2016–17	2D	17th	Quarter-final	Last 16				
2017–18	2D	11th	Quarter-final	1st round				
2018–19	2D	15th	Last 16	1st round				
2019–20	2D	11th	8th round	1st round				
2020–21	2D	6th	Last 32	discontinued				
2021–22	2D	3rd	Last 32	discontinued				
2022–23	1D	17th	16th Round	discontinued				
2023–24	2D	1st	Round of 64	discontinued				
2024–25	1D	11th	Round of 64	discontinued				
2025–26	1D	15th	Round of 64	discontinued				

Color:

Gold	Winner
Silver	Runners-Up
Bronze	3rd place (Semi-final)
Relegated	Second Division
