= Mamadou Faye =

Senegalese footballer (born 1967)

Personal information
- Date of birth: 31 December 1967 (age 58)
- Place of birth: Dakar, Senegal
- Height: 1.76 m (5 ft 9 in)
- Position: Midfielder

Senior career*
Years	Team	Apps	(Gls)
1986–1987	ES La Ciotat		
1987–1998	Bastia	208	(8)
1990–1992	Bastia II	44	(9)
1998–1999	Gazélec Ajaccio	23	(0)

International career
1994–1999	Senegal	7	(0)
- * Club domestic league appearances and goals

Mamadou Faye (born 31 December 1967) is a Senegalese former professional footballer who played as a midfielder. He played in seven matches for the Senegal national team from 1994 to 1999. He was also named in Senegal's squad for the 1994 African Cup of Nations tournament.
