= Cyril Rool =

French footballer (born 1975)

Personal information
- Full name: Cyril Rool
- Date of birth: 15 April 1975 (age 51)
- Place of birth: Pertuis, France
- Height: 1.76 m (5 ft 9 in)
- Position: Midfielder

Youth career
- 1992–1993: Aix-en-Provence

Senior career*
| Years | Team | Apps | (Gls) |
| 1993–1998 | Bastia | 115 | (0) |
| 1998–2004 | Lens | 94 | (0) |
| 2001 | → Marseille (loan) | 4 | (0) |
| 2001–2002 | → Monaco (loan) | 19 | (0) |
| 2004–2005 | Bordeaux | 28 | (2) |
| 2005–2009 | Nice | 107 | (2) |
| 2009–2010 | Marseille | 2 | (0) |
| Total | | 369 | (4) |
- * Club domestic league appearances and goals

Cyril Rool (born 15 April 1975) is a French former professional footballer who played as a midfielder.

== Career ==
Rool was born in Pertuis, Vaucluse.

He was known for his tough game, which is confirmed by a record of 24 red cards and 170 yellow cards in his career.

While at Lens, he played in the final, as they won the 1998–99 Coupe de la Ligue.

On 23 July 2009, Rool joined Olympique de Marseille, where he finished his career.

== Career statistics ==
Appearances and goals by club, season and competition
| Club | Season | League | | | Cup (Note: Includes Coupe de France and Coupe de la Ligue.) | | Continental (Note: Includes UEFA Cup, UEFA Champions League and UEFA Intertoto-Cup.) | | Total | |
| Club | Season | Division | Apps | Goals | Apps | Goals | Apps | Goals | Apps | Goals |
|---|---|---|---|---|---|---|---|---|---|---|
| Bastia | 1993–94 | Division 2 | 15 | 0 | 1 | 0 | – | | 16 | 0 |
| Bastia | 1994–95 | Division 1 | 27 | 0 | 3 | 0 | – | | 30 | 0 |
| Bastia | 1995–96 | Division 1 | 27 | 0 | 2 | 0 | – | | 29 | 0 |
| Bastia | 1996–97 | Division 1 | 22 | 0 | 1 | 0 | – | | 22 | 0 |
| Bastia | 1997–98 | Division 1 | 24 | 0 | 2 | 0 | 8 | 1 | 34 | 1 |
| Bastia | Total | | 115 | 0 | 9 | 0 | 8 | 1 | 132 | 1 |
| Lens | 1998–99 | Division 1 | 24 | 0 | 6 | 0 | 5 | 0 | 35 | 0 |
| Lens | 1999–00 | Division 1 | 15 | 0 | 0 | 0 | 5 | 0 | 20 | 0 |
| Lens | 2000–01 | Division 1 | 25 | 0 | 3 | 1 | 2 | 0 | 30 | 1 |
| Lens | 2002–03 | Ligue 1 | 15 | 0 | 0 | 0 | 5 | 0 | 20 | 0 |
| Lens | 2003–04 | Ligue 1 | 15 | 0 | 3 | 1 | 5 | 0 | 23 | 1 |
| Lens | Total | | 94 | 0 | 12 | 2 | 22 | 0 | 128 | 2 |
| Marseille (loan) | 2001–02 | Division 1 | 4 | 0 | 0 | 0 | – | | 4 | 0 |
| Monaco (loan) | 2001–02 | Division 1 | 19 | 0 | 4 | 0 | – | | 23 | 0 |
| Bordeaux | 2004–05 | Ligue 1 | 28 | 2 | 3 | 0 | – | | 31 | 2 |
| Nice | 2005–06 | Ligue 1 | 29 | 0 | 5 | 1 | – | | 34 | 1 |
| Nice | 2006–07 | Ligue 1 | 25 | 2 | 3 | 1 | – | | 28 | 3 |
| Nice | 2007–08 | Ligue 1 | 32 | 0 | 2 | 0 | – | | 34 | 0 |
| Nice | 2008–09 | Ligue 1 | 20 | 0 | 5 | 0 | – | | 25 | 0 |
| Nice | Total | | 107 | 2 | 15 | 2 | 0 | 0 | 122 | 4 |
| Marseille | 2009–10 | Ligue 1 | 2 | 0 | 0 | 0 | – | | 2 | 0 |
| Career total | | | 369 | 4 | 40 | 4 | 30 | 1 | 439 | 9 |
