= 1996–97 Coupe de France =

Tournament details
- Country: France
- Teams: 5,986

Final positions
- Champions: Nice
- Runners-up: Guingamp

Tournament statistics
- Top goal scorer: Six players (3 goals)

The Coupe de France 1996–97 was its 80th edition. It was won by OGC Nice which defeated En Avant Guingamp in the Final.

== Round of 64 ==
Team 1	Score	Team 2
Metz (D1)	3–3 (a.e.t.) (1–3 p)	Montpellier (D1)
Marseille (D1)	0–1	Lille (D1)
Laval (D2)	1–0	Monaco (D1)
Sochaux (D2)	3–1 (a.e.t.)	Nancy (D1)
Valence (D2)	0–1	Nice (D1)
Niort (D2)	2–1	Le Havre (D1)
Besançon (Nat.1)	0–3	Paris Saint-Germain (D1)
Brive (Nat.1)	1–3 (a.e.t.)	Bordeaux (D1)
Mont-de-Marsan (Nat.1)	0–1 (a.e.t.)	Guingamp (D1)
Vitrolles (Nat.1)	2–1 (a.e.t.)	Nantes (D1)
Bourges (Nat.1)	0–3	Lens (D1)
La Roche (Nat.2)	2–4	Bastia (D1)
Vitré (Nat.2)	1–3	Lyon (D1)
Muret (Nat.2)	1–2	Cannes (D1)
Schiltigheim (Nat.2)	0–4	Strasbourg (D1)
Carquefou (Nat.3)	0–1 (a.e.t.)	Caen (D1)
Reims (Nat.3)	2–3	Rennes (D1)
Vervins (PH)	0–6	Auxerre (D1)
Épinal (D2)	0–0 (a.e.t.) (5–6 p)	Troyes (D2)
Aubervilliers (Nat.1)	1–2	Red Star (D2)
Créteil (Nat.1)	5–0	Louhans-Cuiseaux (D2)
Martigues (D2)	3–1 (a.e.t.)	Istres (Nat.1)
Wasquehal (Nat.1)	2–2 (a.e.t.) (5–3 p)	Amiens (D2)
Raon (Nat.2)	1–1 (a.e.t.) (4–3 p)	Toulouse (D2)
Clermont (Nat.2)	3–2	Lorient (D2)
Saint-Lô (Nat.2)	1–1 (a.e.t.) (3–1 p)	Châteauroux (D2)
St-Louis Neuweg (DH)	0–3	Gueugnon (D2)
Paris FC (Nat.1)	3–2	Stade Poitevin (Nat.1)
Fécamp (Nat.1)	4–3	Avranches (Nat.1)
Aurillac (Nat.2)	3–1	Villefranche (Nat.2)
Armentières (Nat.3)	0–3	Boulogne (Nat.2)
Niort Saint-Liguaire (DH)	1–2 (a.e.t.)	Toulouse Fontaines (Nat.2)

== Round of 32 ==
Team 1	Score	Team 2
Bastia (D1)	2–2 (a.e.t.) (3–4 p)	Nice (D1)
Auxerre (D1)	0–0 (a.e.t.) (5–4 p)	Lens (D1)
Lille (D1)	1–0	Lyon (D1)
Rennes (D1)	0–1	Troyes (D2)
Montpellier (D1)	2–0	Sochaux (D2)
Fécamp (Nat.1)	0–2	Paris Saint-Germain (D1)
Paris FC (Nat.1)	0–1	Cannes (D1)
Wasquehal (Nat.1)	1–3	Guingamp (D1)
Raon (Nat.2)	0–1	Strasbourg (D1)
Saint-Lô (Nat.2)	1–2 (a.e.t.)	Caen (D1)
Toulouse Fontaines (Nat.2)	0–2	Bordeaux (D1)
Red Star (D2)	1–2	Niort (D2)
Boulogne (Nat.2)	1–2	Laval (D2)
Aurillac (Nat.2)	2–2 (a.e.t.) (4–5 p)	Gueugnon (D2)
Clermont (Nat.2)	1–1 (a.e.t.) (5–3 p)	Martigues (D2)
Vitrolles (Nat.1)	0–0 (a.e.t.) (4–5 p)	Créteil (Nat.1)

== Round of 16 ==
Team 1	Score	Team 2
Guingamp (D1)	1–0	Caen (D1)
Bordeaux (D1)	1–0	Cannes (D1)
Lille (D1)	0–3	Montpellier (D1)
Troyes (D2)	1–0	Auxerre (D1)
Nice (D1)	2–0	Gueugnon (D2)
Créteil (Nat.1)	1–0	Strasbourg (D1)
Clermont (Nat.2)	4–4 (a.e.t.) (4–3 p)	Paris Saint-Germain (D1)
Niort (D2)	0–1	Laval (D2)

== Quarter-finals ==
29 March 1997	Créteil (3)	1–3 (a.e.t.)	Guingamp (1)	Paris
	Calabuig 39'		Haon 32' (o.g.); Carnot 109'; Coridon 117'	Stadium: Parc des Princes; Attendance: 11,048; Referee: Alain Sars

29 March 1997	Laval (2)	1–0	Troyes (2)	Laval
	Lima 76'			Stadium: Stade Francis Le Basser; Attendance: 15,549; Referee: Rémy Harrel

29 March 1997	Bordeaux (1)	1–2	Montpellier (1)	Bordeaux
	Tholot 15'		Sauzée 44'; Ferhaoui 66'	Stadium: Parc Lescure; Attendance: 12,625; Referee: Bruno Coué

30 March 1997	Clermont (4)	1–2 (a.e.t.)	Nice (1)	Clermont-Ferrand
	Groueix 77'		Debbah 9'; Fugen 110'	Stadium: Stade Gabriel Montpied; Attendance: 9,300; Referee: Pascal Garibian

== Semi-finals ==
19 April 1997	Guingamp (1)	2–0 (a.e.t.)	Montpellier (1)	Guingamp
	Wreh 109'; Carnot 120'			Stadium: Stade de Roudourou; Attendance: 10,000; Referee: Marc Batta

20 April 1997	Laval (2)	0–1	Nice (1)	Laval
			De Neef 33'	Stadium: Stade Francis Le Basser; Attendance: 18,000; Referee: Bernard Saules

== Final ==
10 May 1997
20:00

Nice	1–1 (a.e.t.)	Guingamp
Salimi 21'		Laspalles 78'
Penalties
Onorati (penalty scored); De Neef (penalty scored); Tatarian (penalty scored); Gomis (penalty missed); Vermeulen (penalty scored)	5–4	(penalty missed) Carnot; (penalty scored) Baret; (penalty scored) Horlaville; (penalty scored) Vannuchi; (penalty missed) Michel

Parc des Princes, Paris
Attendance: 44,131
Referee: Alain Sars

== Topscorer ==
Ibrahima Bakayoko (3 goals)
Thierry De Neef (3 goals)
Arnaud Lassalle (3 goals)
Fabien Lefévre (3 goals)
Didier Tholot (3 goals)
Christopher Wreh (3 goals)
