= 1992–93 Coupe de France =

Tournament details
- Country: France; Monaco

Final positions
- Champions: Paris Saint-Germain (3rd title)
- Runners-up: Nantes

Tournament statistics
- Top goal scorer(s): Reynald Pedros (5 goals)

The Coupe de France's results of the 1992–93 season. Paris SG won the final played on 12 June 1993, beating FC Nantes Atlantique.

== Round of 64 ==
March 1993	Dunkerque (2)	1–3	Gazélec Ajaccio (2)
	Halifa 39'	(Report)	Larré 22'; Périon 63'; Son 65'

March 1993	Vitrolles (5)	2–4	Annecy (2)
	Stavridis 22' (pen.), 45'	(Report)	Mermet 5', 8' (pen.); Abed 50'; Mysliewiecz 65'

March 1993	Bordeaux (1)	1–0	Nice (2)
	Valdeir 22'	(Report)

March 1993	Boulogne (3)	3–0	Yutz (3)
	Roussel 22'; Lassalle 58', 85'	(Report)

March 1993	Caen (1)	1–0	Toulon (1)
	Gravelaine 39' (pen.)	(Report)

March 1993	Beaumont (5)	0–2	Cannes (2)
		(Report)	Bedrossian 60'; Sauvaget 88'

March 1993	Lorient (2)	0–0 (a.e.t.) (3–4 p)	Châtellerault (3)
		(Report)

March 1993	Créteil (2)	2–1	Nîmes (1)
	Adam 29', 35'	(Report)	Monczuk 22'

March 1993	Épinal (2)	2–0	Viry-Châtillon (3)
	Vier 66'; Droesch 75'	(Report)

March 1993	Forbach (4)	1–0	Nancy (2)
	Scattarreggia 38' (pen.)	(Report)

March 1993	Gueugnon (2)	1–1 (a.e.t.) (3–1 p)	Metz (1)
	Leuregans 53'	(Report)	Séchet 64'

March 1993	Pontivy (5)	0–1	Guingamp (2)
		(Report)	Carnot 6'

March 1993	Gravelines (3)	1–3	Laval (2)
	Doméon 35'	(Report)	Bonora 17'; Deharte 44' (o.g.); Vandecasteele 86'

March 1993	Le Touquet (3)	0–3	Le Havre (1)
		(Report)	Kana-Biyik 57'; Mahut 80' (pen.); Roux 88' (pen.)

March 1993	Savigny-sur-Orge (5)	1–3	Lens (1)
	Brain 57'	(Report)	Omam-Biyik 44'; Sikora 84'; Slater 89'

March 1993	Chantilly (4)	1–3	Le Mans (2)
	Lavergne 82'	(Report)	Bossis 19'; Bentoumi 55'; Vidot 59'

March 1993	Marseille (1)	3–1	Martigues (2)
	Ferreri 3', 90'; Di Meco 73'	(Report)	Castro 17' (pen.)

March 1993	Stade Poitevin (3)	2–6	Monaco (1)
	Barreaud 39' (pen.); Branlard 90'	(Report)	Luis Henrique 16', 46', 62'; Djorkaeff 25', 84' (pen.); Perez 63'

March 1993	Montpellier (1)	3–1	La Roche (2)
	Der Zakarian 58'; Divert 74'; Moretti 75' (o.g.)	(Report)	François 50'

March 1993	Mulhouse (2)	0–0 (a.e.t.) (5–3 p)	Sedan (2)
		(Report)

March 1993	Bourg-Perronas (5)	2–4 (a.e.t.)	Nantes (1)
	Promonet 22'; Collet 62'	(Report)	Pedros 3'; Vulić 79'; Dalmao 94', 114'

March 1993	Club Franciscain (R1) (Martinique)	1–3 (a.e.t.)	Niort (2)
	Sophie 73'	(Report)	Lollia 84', 117'; Alajarin 104'

March 1993	Strasbourg (1)	0–1 (a.e.t.)	Paris Saint-Germain (1)
		(Report)	Weah 118'

March 1993	Pau (3)	4–0	Île-Rousse (4)
	Boutal 3', 18'; Lagaronne 48'; Legaz 75'	(Report)

March 1993	Indépendante Pont Saint-Esprit (3)	1–0	Lyon (1)
	Boesso 58'	(Report)

March 1993	Cherbourg (3)	0–1	Rennes (2)
		(Report)	Denis 74'

March 1993	Alès (2)	0–1	Rodez (2)
		(Report)	Keizerweerd 77'

March 1993	Rouen (2)	1–0	Lille (1)
	Horlaville 77'	(Report)

March 1993	Évry (3)	1–3	Saint-Étienne (1)
	Wohlgemuth 83'	(Report)	Camara 50'; Luhový 60'; Molnar 67'

March 1993	Sochaux (1)	4–1 (a.e.t.)	Angers (2)
	Silvestre 54', 118'; Caveglia 101'; Robert 120'	(Report)	Mottin 67'

March 1993	Toulouse (1)	1–0	Auxerre (1)
	Dutuel 19' (o.g.)	(Report)

March 1993	Valenciennes (1)	2–0	Ancenis (2)
	Gaillot 69'; Dufresne 77'	(Report)

== Round of 32 ==
March 1993	Gazélec Ajaccio (2)	1–1 (a.e.t.) (4–2 p)	Sochaux (1)
	Larré 10'	(Report)	Prat 89'	Attendance: 2,276; Referee: Joël Quiniou

March 1993	Bordeaux (1)	2–1	Valenciennes (1)
	Valdeir 2'; Dogon 44'	(Report)	Burruchaga 63'	Attendance: 3,795; Referee: M. Veniel

March 1993	Indépendante Pont Saint-Esprit (3)	0–2	Caen (1)
		(Report)	Point 6'; Calderón 34'	Attendance: 2,700; Referee: Rémi Harrel

March 1993	Boulogne (3)	0–4	Châtellerault (3)
		(Report)	Bordier 12'; Moulin 56'; Mounadi 76', 81'	Attendance: 8,638; Referee: M. Léon

March 1993	Laval (2)	4–0	Guingamp (2)
	Bonora 45'; Vidot 58' (o.g.); Bouzaiene 75'; Suka 78'	(Report)		Attendance: 4,603; Referee: M. de Pandis

March 1993	Gueugnon (2)	0–0 (a.e.t.) (2–4 p)	Lens (1)
		(Report)		Attendance: 3,955; Referee: Gilles Veissière

March 1993	Rouen (2)	0–1	Marseille (1)
		(Report)	Völler 81' (pen.)	Attendance: 16,850; Referee: M. Ramos

March 1993	Niort (2)	0–0 (a.e.t.) (2–4 p)	Monaco (1)
		(Report)		Attendance: 10,098; Referee: M. Lartigot

March 1993	Créteil (2)	0–1	Montpellier (1)
		(Report)	Divert 16'	Attendance: 2,980; Referee: M. Zagni

March 1993	Forbach (4)	0–3	Mulhouse (2)
		(Report)	Tatarian 15', 40', 82'	Attendance: 3,500; Referee: M. Tellene

March 1993	Nantes (1)	9–1	Rodez (2)
	Loko 6', 45'; Karembeu 16'; Ziani 50' (pen.); Pedros 51', 73', 79'; Ouédec 75', 83'	(Report)	Lecompte 52'	Attendance: 7,000; Referee: M. Anton

March 1993	Annecy (2)	0–1	Paris Saint-Germain (1)
		(Report)	Ginola 72'	Attendance: 14,584; Referee: M. Rideau

March 1993	Pau (3)	0–0 (a.e.t.) (7–6 p)	Cannes (2)
		(Report)		Attendance: 12,000; Referee: M. Lalu

March 1993	Rennes (2)	2–1	Le Mans (2)
	Ribar 66'; Farh 68'	(Report)	Gautier 14'	Attendance: 5,968; Referee: M. Poulain

March 1993	Saint-Étienne (1)	1–1 (a.e.t.) (6–5 p)	Épinal (2)
	Pagal 20'	(Report)	Rouani 34'	Attendance: 3,000; Referee: Claude Colombo

March 1993	Le Havre (1)	0–0 (a.e.t.) (3–4 p)	Toulouse (1)
		(Report)		Attendance: 2,613; Referee: M. Lamé

== Round of 16 ==
May 1993	Bordeaux (1)	2–0	Mulhouse (2)
	Valdeir 28'; Zidane 86'	(Report)		Attendance: 6,000; Referee: M. Lainé

May 1993	Laval (2)	1–0	Rennes (2)
	Denis 62' (o.g.)	(Report)		Attendance: 14,396; Referee: M. Cherron

May 1993	Caen (1)	1–2	Marseille (1)
	Cauet 84'	(Report)	Völler 17'; Thomas 25'	Attendance: 6,811; Referee: M. Poulain

May 1993	Montpellier (1)	1–0	Châtellerault (3)
	Bordier 65' (o.g.)	(Report)		Attendance: 2,545; Referee: M. Girard

May 1993	Nantes (1)	1–0	Gazélec Ajaccio (2)
	Pedros 13'	(Report)		Attendance: 8,000; Referee: M. De Pandis

May 1993	Monaco (1)	0–1	Paris Saint-Germain (1)
		(Report)	Kombouaré 85'	Attendance: 8,000; Referee: M. Saules

May 1993	Toulouse (1)	2–0	Lens (1)
	Romano 67'; Bancarel 88'	(Report)		Attendance: 10,286; Referee: Rémi Harrel

May 1993	Saint-Étienne (1)	2–0 (a.e.t.)	Pau (3)
	Moravčík 104'; Luhový 109'	(Report)		Attendance: 6,202; Referee: M. Lartigot

== Quarter-finals ==
11 May 1993	Saint-Étienne (1)	2–1 (a.e.t.)	Marseille (1)	Saint-Étienne
	G. Passi 17'; Casoni 105' (o.g.)		Moreau 61' (o.g.)	Stadium: Stade Geoffroy-Guichard; Attendance: 20,009; Referee: Marcel Lainé

18 May 1993	Paris Saint-Germain (1)	2–0	Bordeaux (1)	Paris
	Fournier 14'; Weah 20'			Stadium: Parc des Princes; Attendance: 20,000; Referee: Alain Sars

19 May 1993	Toulouse (1)	0–1	Laval (2)	Toulouse
			Bonora 4'	Stadium: Stadium Municipal; Attendance: 14,255; Referee: Philippe Leduc

19 May 1993	Montpellier (1)	0–0 (a.e.t.) (4–5 p)	Nantes (1)	Montpellier
				Stadium: Stade de la Mosson; Attendance: 9,571; Referee: Gilles Veissière

== Semi-finals ==
6 June 1993	Paris Saint-Germain (1)	1–0	Laval (2)	Paris
	Guérin 60'			Stadium: Parc des Princes; Attendance: 8,000; Referee: Michel Girard

6 June 1993	Saint-Étienne (1)	0–1	Nantes (1)	Saint-Étienne
			Ouédec 81'	Stadium: Stade Geoffroy-Guichard; Attendance: 28,302; Referee: Marc Batta

== Final ==
13 June 1993
20:00

Paris Saint-Germain	3–0	Nantes
Kombouaré 50' (pen.); Ginola 55'; Roche 60'

Parc des Princes, Paris
Attendance: 48,789
Referee: Rémi Harrel
