= 1997 Coupe de France final =

Final of the 1996–97 edition of the Coupe de France

- Event: 1996–97 Coupe de France
Nice	Guingamp
1	1
- After extra time Nice won 5–4 on penalties
- Date: 10 May 1997
- Venue: Parc des Princes, Paris
- Referee: Alain Sars
- Attendance: 44,131

The 1997 Coupe de France final was a football match held at the Parc des Princes, Paris on 10 May 1997, that saw Nice defeat Guingamp in a penalty shoot out. After normal time and extra-time could not separate the two sides, the match was to be decided on penalty kicks. Stéphane Carnot and Claude Michel missed for Guingamp, while only Louis Gomis missed for Nice. This final was the last Coupe de France final held at the Parc des Princes, with the following year's final held at the new Stade de France.

== Road to the final ==
Nice			Round	Guingamp
Opponent	H/A	Result	1996–97 Coupe de France	Opponent	H/A	Result
Valence	A	1–0	Round of 64	Mont-de-Marsan	A	1–0 (a.e.t.)
Bastia	A	2–2 (a.e.t.); 4−3 pen.	Round of 32	Wasquehal	A	3–1
Gueugnon	A	2–0	Round of 16	Caen	A	1–0
Clermont	A	2–1 (a.e.t.)	Quarter-finals	Créteil	A	3–1 (a.e.t.)
Laval	A	1–0	Semi-finals	Montpellier	H	2–0 (a.e.t.)

== Match details ==
10 May 1997
20:00

Nice	1–1 (a.e.t.)	Guingamp
Salimi 21'		Laspalles 78'
Penalties
Onorati (penalty scored); De Neef (penalty scored); Tatarian (penalty scored); Gomis (penalty missed); Vermeulen (penalty scored)	5–4	(penalty missed) Carnot; (penalty scored) Baret; (penalty scored) Horlaville; (penalty scored) Vannuchi; (penalty missed) Michel

Parc des Princes, Paris
Attendance: 44,131
Referee: Alain Sars

OGC NICE:
GK	1	(France) Bruno Valencony
DF		(France) Henri Savini	(substituted off) 77'
DF		(Algeria) Youssef Salimi
DF		(France) Frédéric Tatarian
DF		(France) Olivier Fugen	(substituted off) 91'
DF		(France) Louis Gomis
MF		(Italy) Roberto Onorati
MF		(France) Frédéric Gioria (c)
MF		(France) Thierry De Neef
FW		(Poland) Andrzej Kubica
FW		(Morocco) Mohammed Chaouch	(substituted off) 83'
Substitutes:
DF		(France) Thierry Crétier	(substituted on) 77'
FW		(Liberia) James Debbah	(substituted on) 83'
DF	12	(Netherlands) Arjan Vermeulen	(substituted on) 91'
Manager:
(Federal Republic of Yugoslavia) Silvester Takač Assistant Referees: Fourth Official:

EN AVANT GUINGAMP:
GK	1	(France) Angelo Hugues
DF		(France) Jérôme Foulon	(substituted off) 101'
DF		(Poland) Marek Jóźwiak
DF		(Romania) Gheorghe Mihali
DF	3	(France) Nicolas Laspalles
MF		(France) Richard Lecomte (c)	(substituted off) 51'
MF		(France) Claude Michel
MF		(France) Charles-Edouard Coridon
MF		(France) Yannick Baret
FW		(France) Daniel Moreira	(substituted off) 64'
FW		(Liberia) Christopher Wreh
Substitutes:
MF		(France) Stéphane Carnot	(substituted on) 51'
FW		(France) Christophe Horlaville	(substituted on) 64'
DF		(France) Jean-Luc Vannuchi	(substituted on) 101'
Manager:
(France) Francis Smerecki

== See also ==
- 1996–97 Coupe de France
