= Savini =

Savini is an Italian surname. Notable people with the surname include:

- Alberto Savini (born 1999), Italian footballer
- Alfonso Savini (1836–1908), Italian painter
- Daniel Savini (born 1997), Italian cyclist
- Filippo Savini (born 1985), Italian cyclist
- Henri Savini (born 1975), French footballer
- Maurizio Savini, 21st-century Italian sculptor
- Mirko Savini (born 1979), Italian footballer
- Robert M. Savini (1886–1956), American fim producer and distributor
- Tom Savini (born 1946), American actor, stuntman, director, and special effects and makeup artist

== See also ==
- Salvini (surname)
