= 1995–96 French Division 2 =

57th season of the second-tier football league in France

Division 2
- Season: 1995–96
- Champions: SM Caen
- Promoted: SM Caen; Olympique de Marseille; AS Nancy
- Relegated: Stade Poitevin; USL Dunkerque; Angers SCO; Olympique Alès
- Matches played: 462
- Top goalscorer: Tony Cascarino (30 goals)

The Division 2 season 1995/1996, organised by the LNF was won by SM Caen and saw the promotions of SM Caen, Olympique de Marseille and AS Nancy, whereas Stade Poitevin, USL Dunkerque, Angers SCO and Olympique Alès were relegated to National.

== 22 participating teams ==
- Alès
- Amiens
- Angers
- Caen
- Charleville
- Châteauroux
- Dunkerque
- Épinal
- Laval
- Le Mans
- Lorient
- Louhans-Cuiseaux
- Marseille
- Mulhouse
- Nancy
- Niort
- Perpignan
- Poitiers
- Red Star
- Sochaux
- Toulouse
- Valence

== League table ==
| Pos | Team | Pld | W | D | L | GF | GA | GD | Pts | Promotion or Relegation |
|---|---|---|---|---|---|---|---|---|---|---|
| 1 | Caen (C, P) | 42 | 24 | 9 | 9 | 59 | 34 | +25 | 81 | Promotion to French Division 1 |
| 2 | Marseille (P) | 42 | 23 | 11 | 8 | 69 | 35 | +34 | 80 | Promotion to French Division 1 |
| 3 | Nancy (P) | 42 | 20 | 16 | 6 | 56 | 23 | +33 | 76 | Promotion to French Division 1 |
| 4 | Laval | 42 | 21 | 9 | 12 | 52 | 46 | +6 | 72 | |
| 5 | Toulouse | 42 | 18 | 9 | 15 | 40 | 34 | +6 | 63 | |
| 6 | Le Mans | 42 | 15 | 17 | 10 | 37 | 36 | +1 | 62 | |
| 7 | Red Star | 42 | 16 | 13 | 13 | 56 | 38 | +18 | 61 | |
| 8 | Perpignan | 42 | 17 | 10 | 15 | 44 | 53 | −9 | 61 | |
| 9 | Châteauroux | 42 | 16 | 12 | 14 | 40 | 35 | +5 | 60 | |
| 10 | Sochaux | 42 | 15 | 14 | 13 | 49 | 40 | +9 | 59 | |
| 11 | Louhans-Cuiseaux | 42 | 16 | 10 | 16 | 57 | 49 | +8 | 58 | |
| 12 | Lorient | 42 | 16 | 10 | 16 | 44 | 46 | −2 | 58 | |
| 13 | Amiens | 42 | 13 | 15 | 14 | 43 | 49 | −6 | 54 | |
| 14 | Mulhouse | 42 | 13 | 12 | 17 | 44 | 45 | −1 | 51 | |
| 15 | Valence | 42 | 11 | 18 | 13 | 34 | 42 | −8 | 51 | |
| 16 | Niort | 42 | 13 | 11 | 18 | 48 | 50 | −2 | 50 | |
| 17 | Charleville | 42 | 11 | 15 | 16 | 34 | 54 | −20 | 48 | |
| 18 | Épinal | 42 | 9 | 18 | 15 | 41 | 46 | −5 | 45 | |
| 19 | Poitiers (R) | 42 | 9 | 18 | 15 | 36 | 50 | −14 | 45 | Relegation to Championnat National 1 [fr] |
| 20 | Dunkerque (R) | 42 | 9 | 16 | 17 | 30 | 43 | −13 | 43 | Relegation to Championnat National 1 [fr] |
| 21 | Angers (R) | 42 | 7 | 16 | 19 | 31 | 53 | −22 | 37 | Relegation to Championnat National 1 [fr] |
| 22 | Alès (R) | 42 | 4 | 13 | 25 | 29 | 72 | −43 | 25 | Relegation to Championnat National 1 [fr] |

Source: Ligue 2
(C) Champions; (P) Promoted; (R) Relegated

== Recap ==
- Promoted to L1 : SM Caen, Olympique de Marseille, AS Nancy
- Relegated to L2 : FC Gueugnon, AS Saint-Étienne, FC Martigues
- Promoted to L2 : Stade Briochin, Troyes AC, Sporting Toulon Var, AS Beauvais
- Relegated to National : Stade Poitevin, USL Dunkerque, Angers SCO, Olympique Alès

== Results ==
| Home \ Away | ALÈ | AMI | ANG | CAE | CHR | CHA | DUN | ÉPI | LAV | MFC | LOR | LOU | OM | MUL | NAL | NRT | PER | POI | RS | SOC | TFC | VLN |
|---|---|---|---|---|---|---|---|---|---|---|---|---|---|---|---|---|---|---|---|---|---|---|
| Alès | | 1–2 | 2–0 | 1–1 | 0–0 | 0–1 | 1–1 | 0–0 | 0–1 | 1–1 | 1–2 | 1–1 | 0–0 | 0–3 | 0–0 | 1–1 | 1–2 | 4–1 | 2–2 | 1–3 | 0–1 | 1–1 |
| Amiens | 3–0 | | 1–1 | 1–1 | 0–0 | 1–0 | 2–1 | 1–0 | 0–3 | 1–1 | 3–2 | 0–1 | 1–2 | 1–0 | 1–1 | 2–1 | 3–2 | 2–2 | 0–2 | 0–1 | 0–1 | 0–1 |
| Angers | 2–2 | 0–2 | | 2–1 | 0–2 | 0–1 | 1–1 | 1–1 | 3–0 | 0–0 | 1–1 | 1–1 | 1–1 | 2–0 | 1–2 | 0–2 | 2–0 | 0–0 | 1–2 | 0–0 | 0–1 | 1–1 |
| Caen | 1–0 | 3–0 | 2–0 | | 2–1 | 1–0 | 2–2 | 3–1 | 1–2 | 1–0 | 3–0 | 2–0 | 2–0 | 3–1 | 1–0 | 3–1 | 2–0 | 2–0 | 2–1 | 1–0 | 2–0 | 3–0 |
| Charleville | 2–2 | 2–1 | 1–1 | 0–0 | | 0–0 | 1–1 | 1–1 | 1–0 | 0–0 | 1–3 | 0–1 | 3–1 | 1–2 | 0–3 | 1–0 | 1–0 | 0–0 | 0–2 | 1–0 | 1–2 | 1–1 |
| Châteauroux | 2–0 | 1–2 | 2–0 | 0–1 | 3–0 | | 2–1 | 3–0 | 1–0 | 1–0 | 1–0 | 1–1 | 4–2 | 3–1 | 0–0 | 0–1 | 2–0 | 0–0 | 2–1 | 1–1 | 1–0 | 0–0 |
| Dunkerque | 0–1 | 0–0 | 1–0 | 0–1 | 0–0 | 2–0 | | 1–1 | 2–2 | 0–0 | 0–1 | 1–0 | 1–2 | 1–0 | 0–1 | 0–1 | 2–1 | 1–1 | 0–0 | 0–1 | 1–0 | 2–0 |
| Épinal | 3–1 | 0–0 | 5–1 | 4–0 | 1–1 | 3–0 | 0–0 | | 1–0 | 3–3 | 1–2 | 2–1 | 2–0 | 1–1 | 2–2 | 2–1 | 0–1 | 2–0 | 0–0 | 0–0 | 0–2 | 0–0 |
| Laval | 1–0 | 4–1 | 2–1 | 1–1 | 3–0 | 0–0 | 1–2 | 2–1 | | 2–0 | 1–0 | 3–1 | 1–3 | 2–1 | 0–0 | 2–1 | 1–1 | 1–0 | 3–2 | 2–0 | 1–1 | 2–1 |
| Le Mans | 0–1 | 0–0 | 1–0 | 1–0 | 3–2 | 0–0 | 2–0 | 1–0 | 0–0 | | 1–0 | 0–0 | 1–2 | 0–1 | 2–1 | 2–1 | 1–1 | 2–0 | 1–1 | 1–0 | 2–1 | 1–1 |
| Lorient | 2–0 | 1–1 | 2–0 | 1–1 | 3–0 | 2–4 | 1–2 | 0–0 | 2–0 | 3–0 | | 2–1 | 0–1 | 0–0 | 0–0 | 2–1 | 0–2 | 0–1 | 2–0 | 0–3 | 2–0 | 2–0 |
| Louhans-Cuiseaux | 2–1 | 0–0 | 3–0 | 0–2 | 2–1 | 3–1 | 1–0 | 2–2 | 4–1 | 0–2 | 2–0 | | 3–1 | 2–1 | 0–1 | 3–0 | 4–1 | 3–0 | 0–4 | 4–0 | 1–2 | 2–2 |
| Marseille | 4–0 | 2–0 | 0–0 | 1–0 | 4–0 | 1–0 | 0–0 | 3–0 | 5–0 | 3–1 | 1–1 | 2–0 | | 1–0 | 2–0 | 2–1 | 5–1 | 3–0 | 2–1 | 4–1 | 1–1 | 2–2 |
| Mulhouse | 3–0 | 3–1 | 0–0 | 0–0 | 1–3 | 2–1 | 0–0 | 2–1 | 1–1 | 2–0 | 3–0 | 3–2 | 2–0 | | 0–1 | 3–3 | 1–1 | 3–1 | 0–0 | 1–0 | 0–0 | 1–1 |
| Nancy | 1–0 | 1–1 | 1–1 | 3–0 | 3–0 | 0–0 | 3–0 | 3–0 | 1–0 | 3–0 | 0–1 | 1–1 | 2–0 | 1–1 | | 4–0 | 2–0 | 1–0 | 0–0 | 2–0 | 2–3 | 2–0 |
| Niort | 5–1 | 2–0 | 0–1 | 1–1 | 0–1 | 0–0 | 2–1 | 0–0 | 2–1 | 2–3 | 1–0 | 0–0 | 0–0 | 1–0 | 2–3 | | 0–1 | 0–0 | 2–3 | 2–2 | 1–0 | 5–0 |
| Perpignan | 3–2 | 2–0 | 0–2 | 1–0 | 0–0 | 1–0 | 1–1 | 1–0 | 2–0 | 0–1 | 1–1 | 1–0 | 0–2 | 2–1 | 2–1 | 1–0 | | 1–1 | 2–0 | 2–4 | 0–1 | 1–0 |
| Poitiers | 3–0 | 1–3 | 2–1 | 0–1 | 2–1 | 2–1 | 3–0 | 1–1 | 0–1 | 2–2 | 1–1 | 2–2 | 0–0 | 2–0 | 0–2 | 1–1 | 1–2 | | 2–1 | 2–0 | 1–1 | 0–0 |
| Red Star | 6–0 | 1–4 | 2–0 | 2–1 | 1–2 | 0–0 | 0–0 | 2–0 | 0–1 | 0–0 | 4–0 | 2–1 | 2–2 | 3–0 | 1–1 | 0–1 | 0–0 | 3–0 | | 0–0 | 2–0 | 1–0 |
| Sochaux | 2–0 | 0–0 | 4–1 | 4–2 | 4–0 | 0–0 | 2–0 | 3–0 | 2–2 | 0–0 | 1–1 | 2–0 | 1–0 | 1–0 | 1–1 | 0–0 | 4–4 | 0–0 | 0–1 | | 0–1 | 2–1 |
| Toulouse | 2–0 | 2–2 | 0–1 | 1–2 | 0–1 | 2–0 | 4–2 | 0–1 | 1–2 | 0–1 | 0–1 | 0–2 | 0–0 | 1–0 | 0–0 | 2–0 | 0–0 | 0–0 | 3–1 | 1–0 | | 2–0 |
| Valence | 1–0 | 0–0 | 1–1 | 1–1 | 1–1 | 4–1 | 1–0 | 0–0 | 1–0 | 0–0 | 2–0 | 1–0 | 0–2 | 1–0 | 0–0 | 1–3 | 4–0 | 1–1 | 1–0 | 1–0 | 0–1 | |

Source: Ligue 2
Legend: Blue = home team win; Yellow = draw; Red = away team win.

== Top goalscorers ==
| Rank | Player | Club | Goals |
|---|---|---|---|
| 1 | (Republic of Ireland) Tony Cascarino | Marseille | 30 |
| 2 | (France) Franck Priou | Caen | 24 |
| 3 | (France) Samuel Lobé | Laval | 20 |
| 4 | (Belgium) Patrick Van Kets | Le Mans | 17 |
| 4 | (Brazil) Walquir Mota | Niort | 17 |
| 4 | (France) Étienne Mendy | Sochaux | 17 |
| 7 | (France) Olivier Pickeu | Amiens | 16 |
| 7 | (Togo) Koffi Fiawoo | Louhans-Cuiseaux | 16 |
| 7 | (Madagascar) Éric Rabésandratana | Nancy | 16 |
| 7 | (France) Stéphane Crucet | Perpignan | 16 |
| 7 | (France) Steve Marlet | Red Star | 16 |
