= 1997–98 French Division 2 =

59th season of the second-tier football league in France

Division 2
- Season: 1997–98

The Division 2 season 1997/1998, organised by the LNF was won by AS Nancy and saw the promotions of AS Nancy, FC Lorient and FC Sochaux-Montbéliard, whereas CS Louhans-Cuiseaux, Sporting Toulon Var, FC Martigues and FC Mulhouse were relegated to National.

== 22 participating teams ==
- Amiens
- Beauvais
- Caen
- Gueugnon
- Laval
- Le Mans
- Lille
- Lorient
- Louhans-Cuiseaux
- Martigues
- Mulhouse
- Nancy
- Nice
- Nîmes
- Niort
- Red Star
- Saint-Étienne
- Sochaux
- Toulon
- Troyes
- Valence
- Wasquehal

== League table ==
Pos	Team	Pld	W	D	L	GF	GA	GD	Pts	Promotion or Relegation
1	Nancy (C, P)	42	20	16	6	64	37	+27	76	Promotion to French Division 1
2	Lorient (P)	42	21	12	9	68	38	+30	75	Promotion to French Division 1
3	Sochaux (P)	42	18	12	12	56	37	+19	66	Promotion to French Division 1
4	Lille	42	17	14	11	62	44	+18	65	
5	Troyes	42	16	15	11	48	38	+10	63	
6	Le Mans	42	16	14	12	54	46	+8	62	
7	Valence	42	12	22	8	51	45	+6	58	
8	Red Star	42	15	12	15	51	61	−10	57	
9	Caen	42	15	11	16	61	55	+6	56	
10	Niort	42	12	19	11	42	38	+4	55	
11	Gueugnon	42	16	7	19	47	54	−7	55	
12	Amiens	42	14	13	15	40	49	−9	55	
13	Laval	42	14	12	16	50	48	+2	54	
14	Nice	42	11	19	12	40	40	0	52	
15	Nîmes	42	13	13	16	41	51	−10	52	
16	Beauvais	42	11	18	13	40	47	−7	51	
17	Saint-Étienne	42	12	15	15	47	60	−13	51	
18	Wasquehal	42	14	9	19	49	63	−14	51	
19	Louhans-Cuiseaux (R)	42	13	10	19	41	51	−10	49	Relegation to Championnat National [fr]
20	Toulon (R)	42	12	10	20	43	62	−19	46	Relegation to Championnat National [fr]
21	Martigues (R)	42	10	15	17	37	63	−26	45	Relegation to Championnat National [fr]
22	Mulhouse (R)	42	9	14	19	51	56	−5	41	Relegation to Championnat National [fr]

Source: Ligue 2
(C) Champions; (P) Promoted; (R) Relegated

== Recap ==
- Promoted to L1 : AS Nancy, FC Lorient, FC Sochaux-Montbéliard
- Relegated to L2 : EA Guingamp, LB Châteauroux, AS Cannes
- Promoted to L2 : AC Ajaccio, CS Sedan Ardennes
- Relegated to National : CS Louhans-Cuiseaux, Sporting Toulon Var, FC Martigues, FC Mulhouse

== Results ==
Home \ Away	AMI	BEA	CAE	GUE	LAV	MFC	LIL	LOR	LOU	MAR	MUL	NAL	NIC	NMS	NRT	RS	STE	SOC	SCT	TRO	VLN	WAS
Amiens		2–1	1–1	2–1	2–0	2–0	0–0	3–0	1–1	2–1	1–0	1–1	2–2	2–0	1–0	0–0	0–0	0–2	1–2	0–2	1–1	1–0
Beauvais	1–0		2–3	3–2	1–1	1–2	2–1	1–1	1–0	0–0	1–1	0–0	1–0	5–3	1–1	2–1	0–0	1–1	3–2	0–1	1–2	0–0
Caen	1–3	0–1		4–0	2–0	0–0	0–2	1–1	5–0	5–0	2–1	2–2	0–0	3–1	0–0	1–1	2–0	2–1	1–1	2–0	1–1	6–0
Gueugnon	0–1	1–1	2–1		2–1	1–1	4–0	1–2	1–0	3–0	1–0	2–2	1–2	1–0	0–0	4–0	1–1	3–1	1–0	0–1	1–0	2–1
Laval	3–0	2–0	0–2	0–0		2–3	1–2	0–1	3–0	1–0	3–0	0–0	1–1	2–1	0–0	3–1	4–1	0–1	1–1	2–1	2–2	2–2
Le Mans	4–2	1–1	2–0	2–3	0–2		1–1	2–2	1–0	0–0	0–1	1–0	2–0	1–2	1–0	6–3	3–0	0–0	5–0	1–1	1–1	1–0
Lille	0–1	3–0	3–0	2–0	3–0	2–0		1–0	3–1	7–3	1–0	2–3	2–0	2–1	3–0	4–1	2–1	0–0	0–1	0–2	1–1	1–1
Lorient	0–0	2–0	3–0	3–0	1–1	1–1	2–0		2–1	5–1	1–1	2–3	1–1	4–0	2–0	5–2	4–0	2–1	1–3	3–0	1–1	1–0
Louhans-Cuiseaux	0–1	1–0	0–2	2–1	1–0	1–0	2–2	1–3		3–0	0–0	1–1	0–1	2–0	1–0	2–0	0–0	0–1	1–0	1–1	2–0	5–0
Martigues	3–2	0–0	0–2	2–0	3–2	0–0	1–1	0–1	3–1		1–1	0–0	0–0	0–0	0–0	2–0	1–0	1–2	2–1	1–4	2–0	1–3
Mulhouse	4–0	0–0	4–2	1–2	0–1	1–2	1–3	1–0	3–3	4–1		2–2	1–1	3–2	3–0	2–1	1–2	2–2	4–0	0–0	1–1	1–2
Nancy	2–0	0–1	3–0	3–0	2–0	1–1	1–1	2–0	3–1	0–0	2–1		2–1	1–0	1–1	2–0	2–0	2–0	3–0	1–1	2–4	2–1
Nice	1–1	2–0	0–1	2–0	1–0	0–2	2–1	1–1	2–0	1–1	0–0	1–1		3–0	0–2	1–1	2–0	2–1	1–1	0–0	0–0	1–0
Nîmes	0–0	0–0	3–1	1–0	1–1	1–1	0–0	1–0	0–0	0–2	2–0	0–3	0–0		1–1	2–2	3–0	2–1	2–0	1–1	1–2	2–1
Niort	0–0	1–1	0–0	1–0	1–2	3–0	2–0	0–0	1–1	0–0	1–0	2–1	4–2	1–0		2–0	1–3	0–0	3–0	2–0	1–1	3–1
Red Star	2–0	1–1	1–0	2–0	1–0	2–1	1–1	3–2	1–0	2–1	2–1	0–1	1–0	2–3	1–1		1–0	2–0	3–1	0–0	1–1	1–1
Saint-Étienne	2–1	1–1	3–0	0–1	3–2	1–2	2–2	0–0	2–2	1–1	2–2	0–2	3–2	1–1	4–2	1–0		3–2	3–1	1–1	0–0	0–0
Sochaux	3–1	2–0	2–0	2–0	1–1	0–2	0–0	0–1	0–1	4–1	3–0	0–1	1–1	1–0	1–1	1–1	4–0		4–1	4–0	1–0	2–1
Toulon	1–1	2–0	2–1	1–3	1–1	6–1	1–0	0–1	2–0	1–2	2–1	0–0	1–0	0–1	1–1	2–3	0–2	0–0		2–1	0–0	1–0
Troyes	2–1	0–0	2–1	3–0	0–1	0–0	1–1	0–2	0–1	3–0	1–1	4–2	1–1	1–1	1–0	2–0	1–2	0–1	1–0		2–2	1–0
Valence	3–0	1–3	2–2	2–2	2–0	1–0	3–1	3–2	2–1	0–0	1–0	1–1	1–1	0–1	2–2	0–0	1–1	1–2	2–1	0–1		2–1
Wasquehal	2–0	3–2	5–2	1–0	1–2	1–0	1–1	1–2	2–1	1–0	2–1	3–1	2–1	0–1	2–1	2–4	2–1	1–1	1–1	0–4	1–1	

Source: Ligue 2
Legend: Blue = home team win; Yellow = draw; Red = away team win.

== Top goalscorers ==
Rank	Player	Club	Goals
1	(France) Réginald Ray	Le Mans	20
2	(France) Samuel Lobé	Lille	19
2	(France) Didier Thimothée	Saint-Étienne	19
4	(France) Bernard Bouger	Sochaux	18
5	(France) Olivier Pickeu	Amiens	17
5	(Federal Republic of Yugoslavia) Slađan Đukić	Troyes	17
7	(Togo) Robert Malm	Lorient	16
8	(Algeria) Ali Bouafia	Lorient	15
8	(France) Bruno Roux	Beauvais	15
8	(France) William Loko	Wasquehal	15
