= 1993–94 French Division 2 =

55th season of the second-tier football league in France

Division 2
- Season: 1993–94
- Champions: Nice (4th title)
- Promoted: Nice; Rennes; Bastia
- Relegated: Rouen; Valenciennes; Bourges; Istres
- Matches played: 462
- Top goalscorer: Yannick Le Saux (27 goals)

The Division 2 season 1993/1994, organised by the LNF was won by OGC Nice and saw the promotions of OGC Nice, Stade Rennais FC and SC Bastia, whereas FC Rouen, US Valenciennes, FC Bourges and FC Istres were relegated to Division 3.

== 22 participating teams ==
- Alès
- Bastia
- Beauvais
- Bourges
- Charleville
- Dunkerque
- Gueugnon
- Istres
- Laval
- Le Mans
- Mulhouse
- Nancy
- Nice
- Nîmes
- Niort
- Red Star
- Rennes
- Rouen
- Saint-Brieuc
- Sedan
- Valence
- Valenciennes

== League table ==
Pos	Team	Pld	W	D	L	GF	GA	GD	Pts	Promotion or Relegation
1	Nice (C, P)	42	18	18	6	47	25	+22	54	Promotion to French Division 1
2	Rennes (P)	42	20	13	9	57	38	+19	53	Promotion to French Division 1
3	Bastia (P)	42	21	11	10	44	29	+15	53	Promotion to French Division 1
4	Nîmes	42	20	10	12	59	38	+21	50	
5	Red Star	42	20	9	13	61	45	+16	49	
6	Saint-Brieuc	42	18	11	13	53	52	+1	47	
7	Laval	42	16	14	12	56	47	+9	46	
8	Dunkerque	42	13	16	13	44	51	−7	42	
9	Charleville	42	14	14	14	41	48	−7	42	
10	Alès	42	13	15	14	47	50	−3	41	
11	Sedan	42	14	12	16	44	42	+2	40	
12	Nancy	42	15	10	17	49	48	+1	40	
13	Gueugnon	42	11	18	13	43	43	0	40	
14	Mulhouse	42	13	14	15	49	52	−3	40	
15	Valence	42	14	11	17	47	47	0	39	
16	Beauvais	42	10	19	13	45	51	−6	39	
17	Le Mans	42	14	11	17	43	50	−7	39	
18	Niort	42	13	13	16	34	41	−7	39	
19	Rouen (R)	42	15	7	20	45	53	−8	37	Relegation to Championnat National 1 [fr]
20	Valenciennes (R)	42	12	13	17	45	59	−14	37	Relegation to Championnat National 1 [fr]
21	Bourges (R)	42	9	13	20	43	60	−17	31	Relegation to Championnat National 1 [fr]
22	Istres (R)	42	7	12	23	35	62	−27	26	Relegation to Championnat National 1 [fr]

Source: Ligue 2
(C) Champions; (P) Promoted; (R) Relegated

== Recap ==
- Promoted to D1 : OGC Nice, Stade Rennais FC, SC Bastia
- Relegated to D2 : Olympique de Marseille, Toulouse FC, Angers SCO
- Promoted to D2 : FC Perpignan, LB Châteauroux, En Avant Guingamp, Amiens SC
- Relegated to D3 : FC Rouen, US Valenciennes, FC Bourges, FC Istres

== Results ==
Home \ Away	ALÈ	BAS	BEA	BOU	CHR	DUN	GUE	IST	LAV	MFC	MUL	NAL	NIC	NMS	NRT	RS	REN	ROU	SBR	SED	VLN	VAL
Alès		1–1	1–0	3–1	0–2	1–1	2–2	3–0	1–1	1–0	1–1	1–0	0–0	0–0	1–1	0–1	1–1	2–1	2–2	2–1	2–0	2–0
Bastia	1–0		0–1	3–1	3–0	3–0	1–0	1–0	2–1	2–0	1–0	1–0	0–0	1–2	1–0	1–0	2–1	2–0	2–0	0–1	2–1	2–1
Beauvais	3–3	0–0		1–2	1–1	1–1	3–2	1–1	1–1	1–0	0–0	2–1	1–1	1–3	4–1	1–0	0–2	1–1	0–1	1–1	1–0	1–2
Bourges	1–0	0–2	1–1		2–0	1–1	4–1	1–0	1–1	0–3	3–0	2–0	2–2	0–0	1–1	0–1	2–2	1–2	3–3	1–2	5–2	1–1
Charleville	2–2	3–0	0–0	0–1		3–1	0–0	2–1	1–0	2–2	2–1	3–5	0–1	0–1	2–1	0–0	0–1	1–1	1–3	0–3	1–0	2–1
Dunkerque	4–1	1–0	1–1	1–1	0–0		1–1	0–0	1–0	2–3	0–2	0–0	0–0	2–0	0–3	1–1	1–0	3–1	2–1	0–0	2–1	4–1
Gueugnon	1–3	0–0	2–0	1–0	1–1	1–0		1–1	1–0	1–0	3–2	4–1	2–0	0–2	0–0	5–0	1–1	3–1	0–0	0–0	2–2	0–0
Istres	2–3	0–0	0–0	2–1	3–1	2–0	1–0		1–1	3–4	2–2	0–0	0–2	0–4	0–2	1–1	0–1	1–2	2–2	0–1	0–0	4–1
Laval	4–1	0–0	1–4	1–0	2–0	4–1	1–1	3–2		0–1	2–0	5–2	1–1	2–2	0–1	1–0	2–0	1–0	2–2	1–1	4–3	1–2
Le Mans	1–1	0–0	1–0	2–0	0–1	0–0	1–1	0–1	2–1		2–0	2–1	1–0	1–4	2–2	0–1	0–1	1–0	2–0	1–1	1–0	1–1
Mulhouse	2–0	1–1	1–1	4–2	1–2	2–1	1–1	4–0	1–1	2–2		2–0	1–0	0–0	2–0	1–2	0–0	0–0	1–0	2–1	2–1	1–1
Nancy	2–0	2–0	4–3	3–0	1–1	1–1	1–0	3–0	0–1	2–1	2–1		0–1	1–2	0–0	3–1	1–1	3–0	1–0	3–0	0–1	1–1
Nice	2–0	2–2	0–1	1–0	1–1	1–2	0–1	1–1	1–1	2–0	2–0	3–1		3–1	1–1	4–1	1–1	2–0	0–0	1–0	0–0	1–0
Nîmes	1–0	0–0	3–1	4–0	0–1	0–1	1–0	1–0	4–0	3–1	1–1	2–0	0–2		0–0	4–2	1–0	1–0	0–2	2–2	2–0	2–0
Niort	1–0	0–1	0–0	0–0	0–0	0–1	1–0	1–0	0–1	3–0	2–1	1–1	0–0	1–1		1–0	2–1	0–1	2–1	1–0	0–1	0–1
Red Star	1–0	1–2	0–1	2–0	1–0	3–3	3–0	2–1	1–1	1–1	4–1	1–0	0–1	3–1	2–0		0–0	5–1	6–1	2–1	0–1	0–0
Rennes	1–0	1–2	5–3	1–1	2–1	1–1	1–0	1–0	0–1	0–1	2–2	2–0	1–1	3–1	6–1	1–2		1–0	1–0	1–0	1–0	2–1
Rouen	0–2	2–0	1–0	2–0	1–2	2–0	1–0	3–0	1–2	3–1	0–1	0–0	1–1	1–0	2–1	0–3	2–3		5–0	1–2	1–1	0–0
Saint-Brieuc	3–1	2–0	0–0	1–0	0–1	4–0	1–1	2–1	1–1	1–0	2–0	2–1	0–1	1–0	1–0	2–1	2–2	3–2		2–1	1–0	1–0
Sedan	1–1	1–0	1–1	0–0	3–0	3–2	2–0	1–2	1–0	1–1	2–1	0–1	0–1	1–0	2–0	2–2	0–1	1–2	2–0		0–1	1–1
Valence	0–0	0–0	4–1	1–0	1–1	0–1	2–2	1–0	2–1	1–0	2–0	0–1	1–1	2–1	0–2	0–1	1–1	2–0	3–3	2–0		4–0
Valenciennes	1–2	3–2	1–1	2–1	0–0	1–0	1–1	2–0	0–2	3–1	1–2	0–0	0–2	2–2	3–1	1–3	1–3	0–1	2–0	2–1	4–3	

Source: Ligue 2
Legend: Blue = home team win; Yellow = draw; Red = away team win.

== Top goalscorers ==
Rank	Player	Club	Goals
1	(France) Yannick Le Saux	Saint-Brieuc	27
2	(France) Samuel Michel	Red Star	23
3	(France) Patrick Weiss	Valence	18
4	(France) Yves Mangione	Valenciennes	17
4	(France) Franck Bonora	Laval	17
4	(France) Samuel Lobé	Rouen	17
4	(Morocco) Hassan Kachloul	Nîmes	17
8	(France) Laurent Sachy	Nancy	15
9	(France) Olivier Vandevoorde	Beauvais	14
9	(France) Jocelyn Gourvennec	Rennes	14
9	(France) Christophe Horlaville	Rouen	14
