= Horlaville =

Horlaville is a surname. Notable people with the surname include:

- Christophe Horlaville (born 1969), French footballer
- Daniel Horlaville (1945–2019), French footballer
