= 1991–92 French Division 2 =

53rd season of the second-tier football league in France

Tournament details
- Country: France
- Teams: 36 (two groups of 18)

Final positions
- Champions: Bordeaux
- Runners-up: Valenciennes

Tournament statistics
- Top goal scorer(s): Jean-Pierre Orts (22 goals)

Statistics of Division 2 in the 1991/1992 season.

== Overview ==
It was contested by 36 teams, and Valenciennes and Girondins Bordeaux won the championship.

== League tables ==
=== Group A ===
Pos	Team	Pld	W	D	L	GF	GA	GD	Pts	Promotion or relegation
1	Valenciennes (P)	32	16	12	4	41	20	+21	44	Promoted
2	Angers	32	17	7	8	50	25	+25	41	
3	Le Mans	32	11	15	6	32	24	+8	37	
4	Cuiseaux Louhans	32	13	10	9	39	31	+8	36	
5	Stade Lavallois	32	14	8	10	36	29	+7	36	
6	En Avant Guingamp	32	13	9	10	36	39	−3	35	
7	Rouen	32	13	8	11	52	38	+14	34	
8	Bourges	32	12	9	11	36	35	+1	33	
9	Tours	32	12	9	11	36	47	−11	33	
10	Dunkerque	32	9	13	10	32	34	−2	31	
11	Ancenis	32	10	11	11	21	25	−4	31	
12	Beauvais	32	8	13	11	36	29	+7	29	
13	Red Star	32	6	15	11	25	30	−5	27	
14	La Roche sur Yon	32	7	12	13	25	42	−17	26	
15	CS Sedan Ardennes	32	7	11	14	22	38	−16	25	
16	Amiens	32	6	12	14	26	43	−17	24	
17	Orléans	32	5	12	15	26	42	−16	22	
18	Brest	0	0	0	0	0	0	0	0	

Source: rsssf.com
(P) Promoted

=== Group B ===
Pos	Team	Pld	W	D	L	GF	GA	GD	Pts	Promotion or relegation
1	Girondins Bordeaux (P)	34	22	8	4	55	24	+31	52	Promoted
2	RC Strasbourg (P)	34	20	9	5	75	26	+49	49	Promoted
3	Istres	34	18	12	4	53	30	+23	48	
4	Bastia	34	16	7	11	56	46	+10	39	
5	Gazélec Ajaccio	34	14	9	11	40	43	−3	37	
6	Rodez	34	12	12	10	43	35	+8	36	
7	Perpignan	34	11	13	10	31	34	−3	35	
8	Berrichonne Chateauroux	34	10	15	9	27	32	−5	35	
9	Nice	34	11	12	11	40	40	0	34	
10	Olympique Alès	34	9	14	11	31	31	0	32	
11	Mulhouse	34	11	9	14	42	45	−3	31	
12	Gueugnon	34	11	9	14	34	43	−9	31	
13	Épinal	34	10	10	14	39	52	−13	30	
14	Martigues	34	6	16	12	38	48	−10	28	
15	Annecy	34	6	14	14	31	39	−8	26	
16	St Seurin (R)	34	5	15	14	26	43	−17	25	Relegated
17	Grenoble (R)	34	8	9	17	25	46	−21	25	Relegated
18	Olympique Saint-Quentin (R)	34	4	11	19	29	58	−29	19	Relegated

Source: rsssf.com
(P) Promoted; (R) Relegated

== Championship play-offs ==
Team 1	Agg.	Team 2	1st leg	2nd leg
Bordeaux	7–2	Valenciennes	4–0	3–2

== Promotion play-offs ==
Quarter-final
2A	Angers (p)	1 (3)
3B	Istres	1 (2)
2B	Strasbourg	3
3A	Le Mans	1

Semi-final
2A	Angers	1	0	1
2B	Strasbourg (a)	1	0	1

Final
18	Rennes	0	1	1
2A	Strasbourg	0	4	4

== Top goalscorers ==
Rank	Player	Club (Grp)	Goals
1	(France) Didier Monczuk	Strasbourg (B)	23
2	(France) Jean-Pierre Orts	Rouen (A)	22
3	(France) Jean-Roch Testa	Gueugnon (B)	19
4	(France) Patrick Weiss	Épinal (B)	18
4	(Brazil) Walquir Mota	Tours (A)	18
6	(Czechoslovakia) Ľubomír Luhový	Martigues (B)	17
6	(France) Yves Mangione	Bastia (B)	17
6	(Morocco) Mohamed Chaouch	Istres (B)	17
9	(France) Christophe Horlaville	Rouen (A)	15
9	(Socialist Federal Republic of Yugoslavia) Goran Bošković	Valenciennes (A)	15
