= Roman Laspalles =

French professional footballer (born 1996)

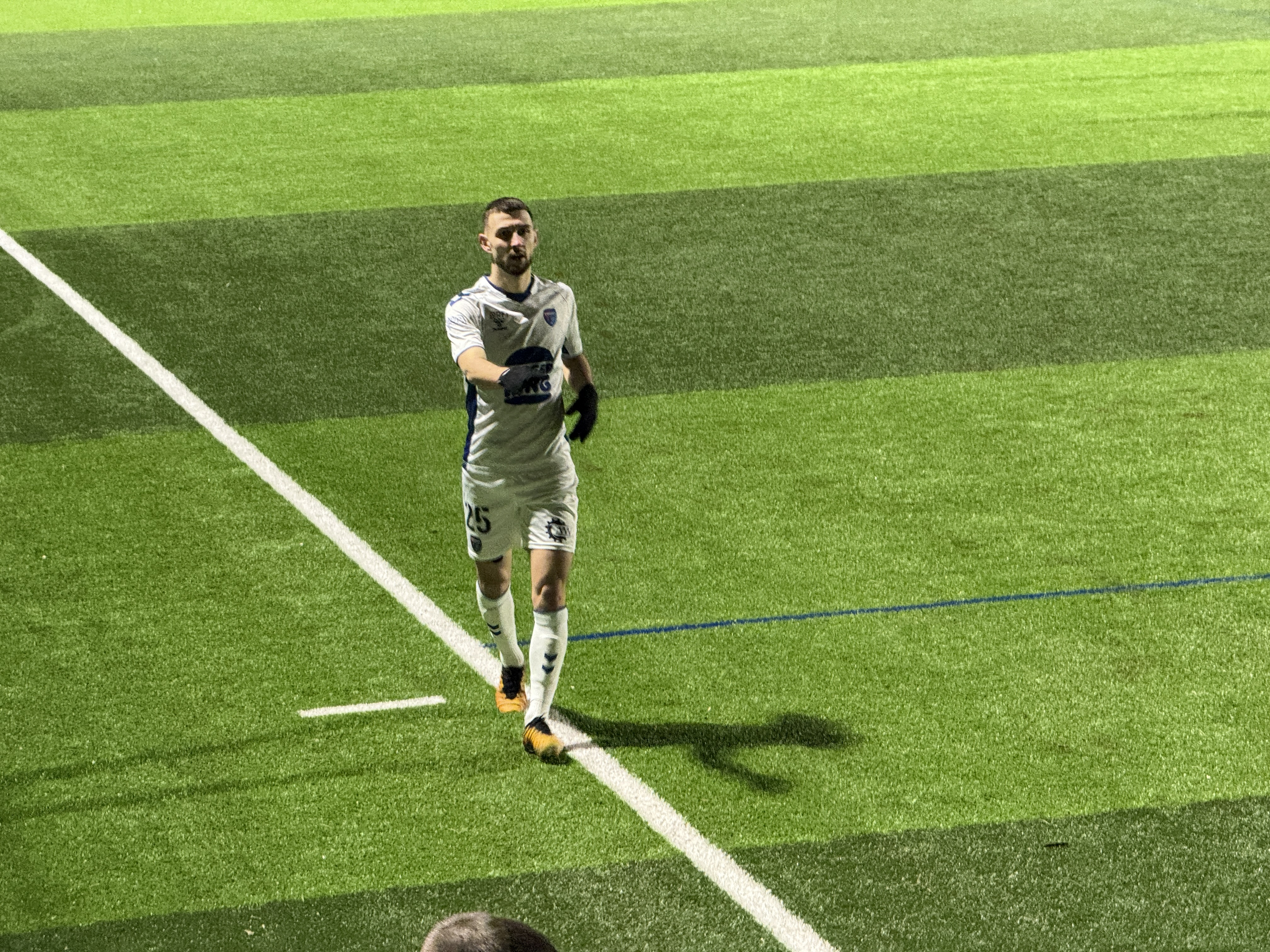
- 2025 Roman Laspalles in stadium Pele during a football match

Personal information
- Full name: Roman Gabriel Laspalles
- Date of birth: 2 November 1996 (age 30)
- Place of birth: Guingamp, France
- Height: 1.78 m (5 ft 10 in)
- Position: Defender

Team information
- Current team: Villefranche

Youth career
- 2013–2016: Guingamp

Senior career*
Years	Team	Apps	(Gls)
2014–2016	Guingamp II	40	(1)
2016–2017	Auxerre II	20	(1)
2016–2017	Auxerre	2	(0)
2017–2018	Les Herbiers II	16	(1)
2017–2018	Les Herbiers	1	(0)
2018–2020	Monts d'Or Azergues	36	(2)
2020–2021	Romorantin	5	(0)
2021–2024	Louhans-Cuiseaux	51	(1)
2023–2026	Bourg-Péronnas	63	(3)
2026–	Villefranche	0	(0)
- * Club domestic league appearances and goals as of 23 June 2026

Roman Gabriel Laspalles (born 2 November 1996) is a French professional footballer who plays as a defender for Ligue 3 club Villefranche.

== Career ==
Laspalles joined Auxerre in 2016 from Guingamp. He made his debut at the professional level in the Ligue 2 game against Red Star on 30 July 2016. After making just one further league appearance, Lapalles signed for Les Herbiers in September 2017.

In November 2018, Laspalles joined Monts d'Or Azergues. After two seasons with the club, he signed for Romorantin in August 2020. In May 2021 he signed for Louhans-Cuiseaux.

== Personal life ==
Roman's father, Nicolas Laspalles, was a former professional footballer who won the Ligue 1 with Nantes in 2001.

== Honours ==
Les Herbiers

- Coupe de France runner-up: 2017–18
