= James Debbah =

Liberian football manager and former player (born in 1969)

Personal information
- Full name: James Salinsa Debbah
- Date of birth: 14 December 1969 (age 56)
- Place of birth: Monrovia, Liberia
- Height: 1.80 m (5 ft 11 in)
- Position: Forward

Senior career*
| Years | Team | Apps | (Gls) |
| 1984–1989 | Mighty Barrolle | ?? | (??) |
| 1989–1990 | Union Douala | ?? | (??) |
| 1990–1991 | Olympique Alès | 21 | (6) |
| 1991–1992 | Monaco | 12 | (2) |
| 1992–1995 | Lyon | 80 | (18) |
| 1995–1997 | Nice | 57 | (22) |
| 1997 | Anderlecht | 7 | (2) |
| 1998 | Paris Saint-Germain | 12 | (0) |
| 1998–1999 | Ankaragücü | 2 | (0) |
| 1999–2001 | Iraklis | 45 | (17) |
| 2001–2003 | Al-Jazira | 61 | (34) |
| 2003–2004 | Al-Muharraq SC | ?? | (??) |
| 2008–2009 | PKT Bontang | 32 | (14) |
| 2009–2011 | Persiram Raja Ampat | 16 | (5) |

International career
| 1986–2018 | Liberia | 58 | (13) |

Managerial career
- 2013–2017: Liberia
- * Club domestic league appearances and goals

James Salinsa Debbah (born 14 December 1969) is a Liberian professional football manager and former player who played as a forward. He was the manager of the Liberia national team from 2013 to 2017.

== Club career ==
Born in Monrovia, Debbah began his professional football career with the Liberian squad Mighty Barrolle in 1984. In 1989, he left Liberia for Union Douala off-season. In 1990, Debbah moved 1991, Debbah moved up to the Ligue 1 squad Monaco and played the UEFA Cup Winners' Cup finals, then the year later he moved to Olympique Lyonnais. In 1995, moved across Ligue 1 to OGC Nice, where he played until 1997, during which time he helped them win the 1996–97 Coupe de France. In that year, Debbah moved to Belgian League side Anderlecht. He moved back to Ligue 1 for one season with Paris Saint-Germain in 1998. After leaving Paris Saint-Germain, Debbah moved to Süper Lig side Ankaragücü for the 1998 and 1999 seasons then to Greek side Iraklis. Debbah moved to Al-Jazeera Club in Abu Dhabi, United Arab Emirates, in 2001 and then to Muharraq Club in Muharraq, Bahrain, in 2003. In 2008, four years after leaving Muharraq Club, he moved to the Indonesia Super League with PKT Bontang for one season.

== International career ==
Debbah was part of both the 1996 and 2002 Liberian national football squads in the African Cup of Nations. During a July 2004 FIFA World Cup qualifying match against Togo in Monrovia, Debbah, as captain, refused to be substituted in the 53rd minute, instead waiting until the 68th minute to leave the pitch. The match resulted in a 0–0 draw, causing the team to leave the stadium under the protection of an armored personnel carrier.

He made a final appearance for the national team in September 2018, at the age of 48, making him the third oldest international player on record.

== Personal life ==
Debbah is the cousin of Liberian footballer George Weah.

== Career statistics ==
Scores and results list Liberia's goal tally first, score column indicates score after each Debbah goal.

List of international goals scored by James Debbah
| No. | Date | Venue | Opponent | Score | Result | Competition | Ref. |
|---|---|---|---|---|---|---|---|
| 1 | 11 July 1987 | National Stadium, Lagos, Nigeria | Nigeria | – | 1–4 | 1988 Summer Olympics qualification | |
| 2 | 21 August 1988 | Samuel Kanyon Doe Sports Complex, Paynesville, Liberia | Ghana | 2–0 | 2–0 | 1990 FIFA World Cup qualification | |
| 3 | 25 June 1989 | Samuel Kanyon Doe Sports Complex, Paynesville, Liberia | Egypt | 1–0 | 1–0 | 1990 FIFA World Cup qualification | |
| 4 | 22 October 1989 | Monrovia, Liberia | Guinea | – | 2–0 | Friendly | |
| 5 | 4 June 1995 | Samuel Kanyon Doe Sports Complex, Paynesville, Liberia | Mauritania | 1–0 | 2–0 | 1996 African Cup of Nations qualification | |
| 6 | 4 June 1995 | Samuel Kanyon Doe Sports Complex, Paynesville, Liberia | Mauritania | 2–0 | 2–0 | 1996 African Cup of Nations qualification | |
| 7 | 1 June 1996 | Independence Stadium, Bakau, The Gambia | Gambia | 1–1 | 1–2 | 1998 FIFA World Cup qualification | |
| 8 | 23 June 1996 | Accra Sports Stadium, Accra, Ghana | Gambia | 4–0 | 4–0 | 1998 FIFA World Cup qualification | |
| 9 | 3 September 2000 | Samuel Kanyon Doe Sports Complex, Paynesville, Liberia | Mauritius | 2–0 | 4–0 | 2002 African Cup of Nations qualification | |
| 10 | 3 September 2000 | Samuel Kanyon Doe Sports Complex, Paynesville, Liberia | Mauritius | 3–0 | 4–0 | 2002 African Cup of Nations qualification | |
| 11 | 14 January 2001 | Samuel Kanyon Doe Sports Complex, Paynesville, Liberia | Congo | 1–1 | 5–1 | 2002 African Cup of Nations qualification | |
| 12 | 14 January 2001 | Samuel Kanyon Doe Sports Complex, Paynesville, Liberia | Congo | 4–1 | 5–1 | 2002 African Cup of Nations qualification | |
| 13 | 4 August 2001 | Giants Stadium, East Rutherford, USA | Colombia | 1–2 | 1–2 | Friendly | |

== Honors ==
Nice

- Coupe de France: 1997
