= Noah Crétier =

French footballer (born 2001)

Personal information
- Full name: Noah Crétier
- Date of birth: 14 November 2001 (age 24)
- Place of birth: Nice, France
- Height: 1.78 m (5 ft 10 in)
- Position: Defender

Team information
- Current team: San Diego State Aztecs

College career
Years	Team	Apps	(Gls)
2022–	San Diego State Aztecs	16	(0)

Senior career*
Years	Team	Apps	(Gls)
2019–2022	Nice II	39	(0)
2020	Nice	0	(0)
- * Club domestic league appearances and goals as of 09:56, 18 February 2021 (UTC)

Noah Crétier (born 14 November 2001) is a French footballer who plays as a defender for San Diego State Aztecs.

== Career ==
Crétier made his professional debut with Nice in a 1–0 UEFA Europa League loss to Hapoel Be'er Sheva on 10 December 2020. In August 2022, he began studying business management at San Diego State University where he would also play college soccer.

== Personal life ==
Crétier is the son of the retired footballer Thierry Crétier.
