= Orpheo Keizerweerd =

Dutch footballer (born 1968)

Personal information
- Full name: Orpheo Henk Keizerweerd
- Date of birth: 21 November 1968 (age 57)
- Place of birth: Paramaribo, Suriname
- Height: 1.73 m (5 ft 8 in)
- Position: Forward

Senior career*
Years	Team	Apps	(Gls)
- IJ.V.V. Stormvogels
–1992	SV Huizen		
1992–1993	Rodez		
1993	Oldham Athletic	1	(0)
1993–1996	Den Bosch	72	(20)
1996	Real Murcia		
1997–1999	SV Huizen		
1999–2000	DWS		
- * Club domestic league appearances and goals

Orpheo Henk Keizerweerd (born 21 November 1968 in Paramaribo) is a retired Suriname footballer.

During his career he played for IJ.V.V. Stormvogels, SV Huizen, Rodez AF, Oldham Athletic A.F.C., FC Den Bosch, and Real Murcia.

In March 1993, he scored the winning goal in a 1992–93 Coupe de France match against Olympique Alès, leading Rodez AF to the Round of 32 only to be beaten by 9–1 to finalists FC Nantes Atlantique. The same month, he was transferred to Oldham Athletic and appeared in a Premier League match against Liverpool as a substitute.
