= Loïc Etoga =

Cameroonian footballer

Personal information
- Full name: Cyrille Loïc Onana Etoga
- Date of birth: 1 April 2003 (age 23)
- Place of birth: Nkol Megnegue, Cameroon
- Height: 1.87 m (6 ft 2 in)
- Position: Midfielder

Team information
- Current team: Villefranche
- Number: 22

Youth career
- AS International

Senior career*
Years	Team	Apps	(Gls)
2021–2022	Olympiacos Volos	1	(0)
2022–2024	Dijon II	24	(4)
2023–2024	Dijon	19	(1)
2024–2025	Bastia II	4	(1)
2024–2026	Bastia	25	(0)
2026–	Villefranche	10	(0)

International career^{‡}
2019	Cameroon U17	1	(0)
- * Club domestic league appearances and goals as of 23 June 2026 ‡ National team caps and goals as of 18:26, 3 September 2025 (UTC)

Cyrille Loïc Onana Etoga (born 1 April 2003) is a Cameroonian professional footballer who plays as a midfielder for French Ligue 3 club Villefranche.

== Club career ==
A youth product of the Cameroonian football academy AS International, Etoga began his senior career in Greece with Olympiacos Volos in the Super League Greece 2 in 2021. On 31 January 2022, he transferred to the French Championnat National club Dijon on a contract until 2024. On 1 July 2024, he transferred to the Ligue 2 club Bastia on a 2+1 year contract. The contract with Bastia was mutually terminated on 29 January 2026.

== International career ==
He was called up to the Cameroon U17s in their winning campaign at the 2019 U-17 Africa Cup of Nations. He again made the Cameroon U17 squad for the 2019 FIFA U-17 World Cup. He was called up to the senior Cameroon national team for a set of 2026 FIFA World Cup qualification matches in September 2025.

== Honours ==
Cameroon U17

- U-17 Africa Cup of Nations: 2019
