= Thierry Crétier =

French footballer (born 1972)

Personal information
- Date of birth: 3 August 1972 (age 54)
- Place of birth: Besançon, France
- Position: Defender

Senior career*
Years	Team	Apps	(Gls)
1989–1997	Nice	166	(10)
1997–1998	Nîmes	40	(1)
1998–1999	Saint-Pierroise		
1999–2000	Reims		
2000–2002	Cagnes-sur-Mer		
2002–2004	Grasse		
- * Club domestic league appearances and goals

Thierry Crétier (born 3 August 1972) is a French former professional footballer who played as a defender.

== Personal life ==
Crétier is the father of the footballer Noah Crétier.

== Honours ==
Nice

- Coupe de France: 1997
