= Thierry De Neef =

French Guianan footballer and manager (born 1966)

Personal information
- Full name: Thierry Albert De Neef
- Date of birth: 27 October 1966 (age 60)
- Place of birth: Paris, France
- Height: 1.75 m (5 ft 9 in)
- Position: Midfielder

Youth career
- CSC Cayenne

Senior career*
Years	Team	Apps	(Gls)
1986–1990	US Créteil		
1990–1992	CS Fontainebleau		
1992–1994	Sedan	74	(4)
1994–1997	Nice	104	(4)
1997–2002	Le Havre	154	(5)
2002–2003	Olympique Alès	22	(0)
2003–2004	Tours	36	(4)
2004–2005	Rapid Menton		

International career
2004	French Guiana	3	(0)

Managerial career
- 2007–2013: CSC Cayenne
- 2018–2022: French Guiana
- * Club domestic league appearances and goals

Thierry Albert De Neef (born 27 October 1966) is a former professional footballer who played as a midfielder. Born in metropolitan France, he represented French Guiana at international level.

== Club career ==
In 1986, De Neef began his career in France with US Créteil. De Neef spent four seasons at the club, before moving to CS Fontainebleau in 1990. In 1992, De Neef signed for Ligue 2 club Sedan. At Sedan, De Neef made over 75 appearances in all competitions. In 1992, De Neef joined Ligue 1 club Nice. In his final season at the club, De Neef won the 1996–97 Coupe de France, scoring a penalty in the penalty shout-out in the final against EA Guingamp. In 1997, De Neef signed for Le Havre, making 154 league appearances, scoring four times, in five seasons at the club. After leaving Le Havre, De Neef played for Olympique Alès, Tours and Rapid Menton in successive seasons.

In November 2004, De Neef played three times for French Guiana in qualification matches for the 2005 CONCACAF Gold Cup.

== Managerial career ==
In 2007, De Neef was appointed manager of French Guiana Honor Division club CSC Cayenne. CSC Cayenne finished second in the league twice under De Neef's reign at the club, before leaving in 2013.

In April 2018, De Neef was appointed manager of French Guiana.

== Honours ==
Nice

- Coupe de France: 1997
