= Andrzej Kubica =

Polish footballer (born 1972)

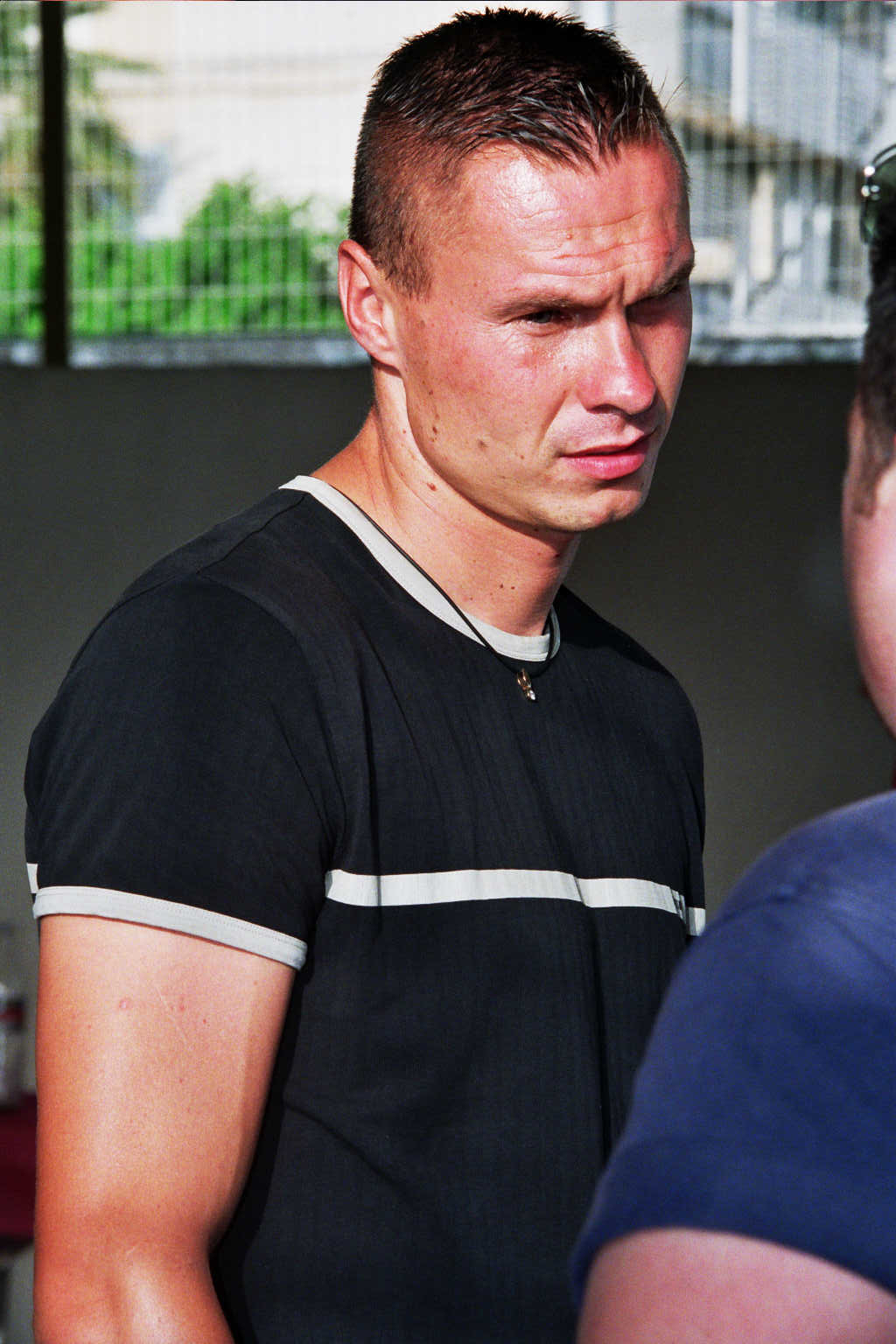

Personal information
- Date of birth: 7 July 1972 (age 54)
- Place of birth: Będzin, Poland
- Height: 1.96 m (6 ft 5 in)
- Position: Forward

Youth career
- Błękitni Sarnów
- Sarmacja Będzin

Senior career*
Years	Team	Apps	(Gls)
1991	CKS Czeladź		
1991–1993	Zagłębie Sosnowiec		
1993–1994	Rapid Wien	32	(9)
1994–1995	Austria Wien	16	(2)
1995	Legia Warsaw	10	(4)
1996	K.S.V. Waregem	15	(7)
1996	Standard Liège	10	(2)
1997	→ Nice (loan)	13	(2)
1997–1998	Standard Liège	0	(0)
1998–2000	Maccabi Tel Aviv	56	(29)
2000	Urawa Reds	34	(11)
2001	Oita Trinita	11	(6)
2001–2002	F.C. Ashdod	15	(9)
2002–2003	Beitar Jerusalem	33	(12)
2003–2004	Maccabi Tel Aviv	24	(4)
2005–2007	Górnik Łęczna	53	(11)
2009	Błękitni Sarnów		
2012–2013	FC Piet L'Air	1	(0)
- * Club domestic league appearances and goals

Andrzej Kubica (born 7 July 1972) is a Polish former professional footballer who played as a forward. He played in Poland, France, Israel and Japan and retired in 2013.

== Career ==
Kubica played for Nice in the French Ligue 1. (Note: Andrzej Kubica – French league stats at LFP – also available in French (archived)) He was the top scorer of the Israeli Premier League in 1999 and then moved to Japan in 2000 to score 11 goals to help Urawa Red Diamonds get back to the J1 League.

== Career statistics ==
Appearances and goals by club, season and competition
Club	Season	League		
Club	Season	Division	Apps	Goals
Zagłębie Sosnowiec	1991–92	Ekstraklasa	17	1
Zagłębie Sosnowiec	1992–93	II liga		
Zagłębie Sosnowiec	Total			
Rapid Wien	1993–94	Austrian Bundesliga	32	9
Austria Wien	1994–95	Austrian Bundesliga	16	2
Legia Warsaw	1995–96	Ekstraklasa	10	4
KSV Waregem	1995–96	Belgian First Division	15	7
Standard Liège	1996–97	Belgian First Division	10	2
Standard Liège	1997–98	Belgian First Division	0	0
Standard Liège	Total		25	9
Nice (loan)	1996–97	Division 1	13	2
Maccabi Tel Aviv	1998–99	Liga Leumit	30	21
Maccabi Tel Aviv	1999–2000	Israeli Premier League	26	8
Maccabi Tel Aviv	Total		56	29
Urawa Reds	2000	J2 League	34	11
Oita Trinita	2001	J2 League	11	6
Ashdod	2001–02	Israeli Premier League	15	9
Beitar Jerusalem	2002–03	Israeli Premier League	33	12
Maccabi Tel Aviv	2003–04	Israeli Premier League	25	4
Górnik Łęczna	2004–05	Ekstraklasa	13	5
Górnik Łęczna	2005–06	Ekstraklasa	29	4
Górnik Łęczna	2006–07	Ekstraklasa	11	2
Górnik Łęczna	Total		53	11
Career total			329	107

== Honours ==
OGC Nice

- Coupe de France: 1996–97

Maccabi Tel Aviv

- Israeli Premier League runner-up: 1998–99, 2003–04
- Toto Cup: 1998–99

Individual

- Israeli Premier League top scorer: 1998–99 (21 goals)
