= FC Villefranche Beaujolais =

French football club

Villefranche
- Full name: Football Club Villefranche Beaujolais
- Nickname: Les Tigres Caladois (The Caladois Tigers)
- Short name: FCVB
- Founded: 1927; 99 years ago
- Ground: Stade Armand Chouffet
- Capacity: 3,500
- Chairman: Philippe Terrier
- Manager: Fabien Pujo
- League: Ligue 3
- 2025–26: Championnat National, 12th of 17
- Website: www.fcvb.fr
Home colours	Away colours

Football Club Villefranche Beaujolais (French pronunciation: [futbol klœb vilfʁɑ̃ʃ boʒɔlɛ]) or simply Villefranche, is a French association football club founded in 1927. They are based in Villefranche-sur-Saône, Rhône-Alpes and play at the Stade Armand Chouffet in town. The team played one season in the second tier of French football during the 1980s. From 2024 to 2025 season, they play in the Ligue 3, the third tier in the French football league system after reprieve from relegation.

== History ==
Football Club Villefranche-Beaujolais was formed in 1927, from the football section of multi-sports club Cercle Sportif de Villefranche. The Beaujolais suffix of the name had been applied by 1985, the club being previously known as Football Club Villefranche.

The club debuted in the national league structure in 1953 when champions of the Lyonnais region of Division d'Honneur they promoted to Division Nationale, the highest tier of amateur football. They maintained this level for five seasons, then relegated in 1958. Promotion to the Division Nationale in 1966 would follow when they were Lyonnaise regional champions. They relegated in 1969.

In 1970 the club gained access to the Division Nationale for a third time. By successfully remaining in the division, the club became part of the third tier of French football when the FFF reorganised the leagues at the end of the 1970–71 season, taking part in the first edition of Division 3 in 1971. They remained that level until relegated to the regional league in 1976.

FC Villefranche were founding members in 1978 when the FFF introduced a fourth division to the national league, having finished 6th in the regional Division d'Honneur the previous season. They maintained this level for the season with an 11th-place finish. A third place season finish in 1979–80, promoted them to Division 3. In 1983 they were promoted to Division 2 although finishing in third place when the two higher placed teams became ineligible for promotion.

The club stayed just one season in Division 2, finishing bottom of Group A and being relegated back to Division 3. They remained at that level until finishing bottom of their group in 1988, and in 1989 suffered a second successive relegation back to the regional league.

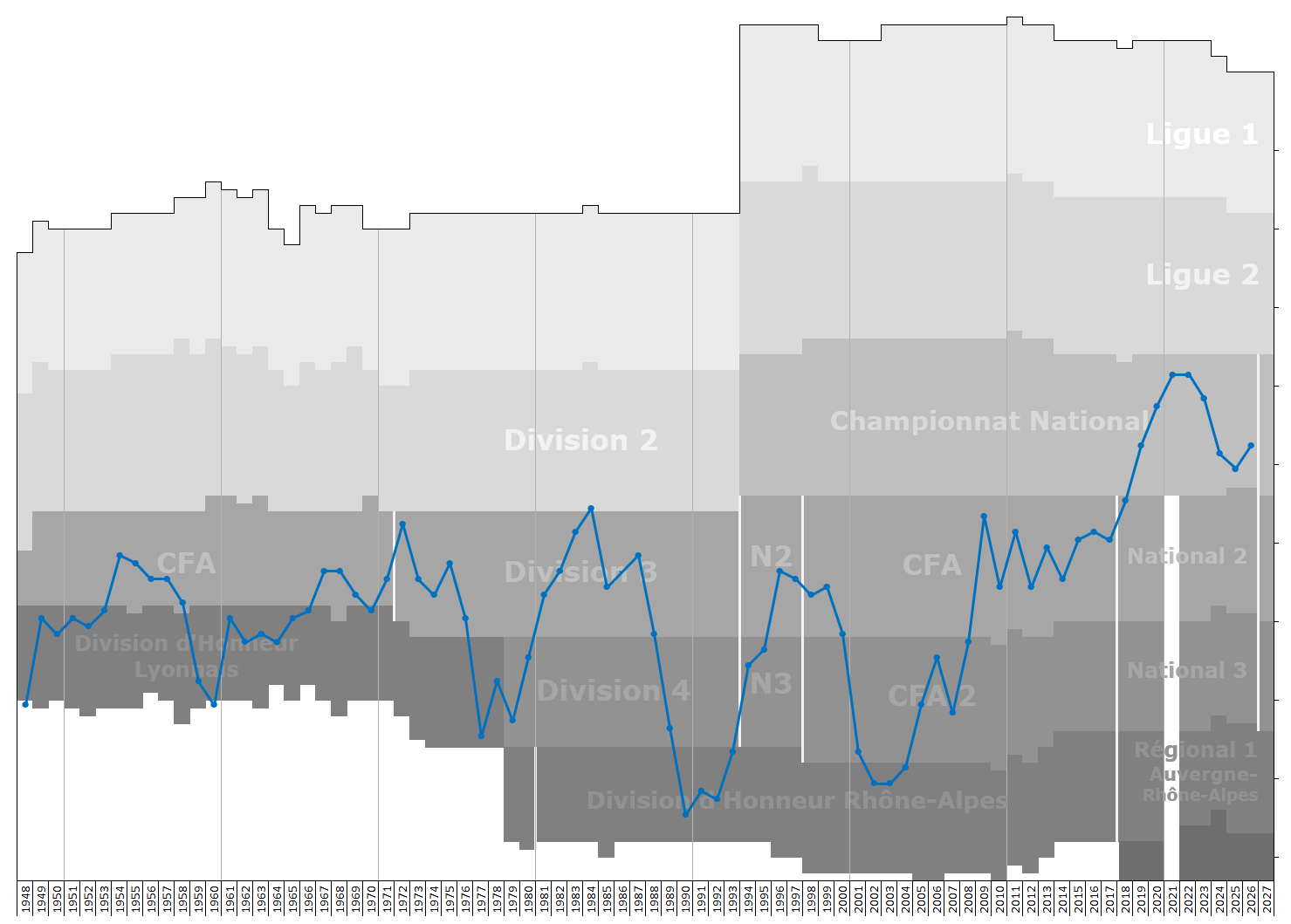
Historical league performance chart of FC Villefranche Beaujolais

In 1993 the FFF introduced a fifth tier, and the club secured a place in the new National 3 division as champions of the Division Honneur (now the Rhône-Alpes region, after internal restructuring of the French regional leagues). After a fourth-place finish in their group in 1994 they secured promotion in 1995 by finishing second in their group. The club completed three seasons of mid-table finishes before being relegated in 2000 and 2001.

As champions of the Division d'Honneur in 2004, they promoted to CFA2. In 2008, they won their group and were promoted to the fourth tier, CFA. The remained at this level until successfully gaining promotion to Championnat National as winners of their group in the 2017–18 season.

In 2023–24, Villefranche secure relegation to Championnat National 2 from 2024 to 2025 after finishing 13th in Championnat National but reprieve from relegation due to Niort was administrative relegation to Championnat National 2.

== Current squad ==
As of 7 September 2026

Note: Flags indicate national team as defined under FIFA eligibility rules; some limited exceptions apply. Players may hold more than one non-FIFA nationality.

No.	Pos.	Nation	Player
1	GK	FRA	Sullivan Péan
4	DF	FRA	Marvin Tshibuabua
5	DF	MTQ	Boris Moltenis
7	MF	MAR	Mourad Louzif
8	MF	FRA	Maxime Etuin
9	FW	MTQ	Loick Piquionne
10	MF	FRA	Léo Yobe
11	FW	FRA	Malick Assef
12	DF	FRA	Fred Ondoa Onambele (on loan from Troyes)
13	MF	BEL	Mathieu Cachbach
14	FW	FRA	Jean-Pierre Tiéhi
16	GK	FRA	Titouan Wilzius

No.	Pos.	Nation	Player
17	MF	FRA	Marvin De Lima
18	DF	FRA	Roman Laspalles
19	DF	GLP	Kemryk Nagera
20	DF	FRA	Yacine Sofiane
21	MF	FRA	Yohan Tadé
22	MF	FRA	Paolo Limon (on loan from Rennes)
23	DF	FRA	Dembo Gassama
25	DF	FRA	Saidou Ouedraogo
26	FW	FRA	Nassim Sabihi
27	FW	FRA	Adama Diakité
29	MF	CMR	Loïc Etoga
