= Thierry Alajarin =

French footballer (born 1967)

Personal information
- Full name: Thierry Alajarin
- Date of birth: June 9, 1967 (age 59)
- Place of birth: Toulouse, France
- Height: 1.85 m (6 ft 1 in)
- Position: Striker

Senior career*
Years	Team	Apps	(Gls)
1990–1991	Blagnac	28	(19)
1991–1992	Olympique Alès	18	(5)
1992–1993	Chamois Niortais	20	(5)
1993–1994	Trélissac	?	(?)
1994–1995	Rodez	24	(7)
1995–1996	Blagnac	9	(1)
1996–1998	Montauban	51	(26)
1998–2000	Balma	?	(?)
- * Club domestic league appearances and goals

Thierry Alajarin (born June 9, 1967) is a former professional footballer.
