= Arjan Vermeulen =

Dutch footballer

Personal information
- Date of birth: 19 March 1969 (age 57)
- Place of birth: Culemborg, Netherlands
- Position: Defender

Senior career*
Years	Team	Apps	(Gls)
1988–1996	Vitesse Arnhem		
1996–1998	Nice		
1998–1999	MVV Maastricht		
1999–2000	Heracles Almelo		
- * Club domestic league appearances and goals

Arjan Vermeulen (born 19 March 1969) is a Dutch former professional footballer who played as a defender.

== Honours ==
Nice

- Coupe de France: 1997
