= Maurizio Savini =

Italian sculptor

Maurizio Savini is an Italian sculptor known for making art out of chewing gum.

== Biography ==
Maurizio Savini was born in Roma. He has been commissioned as stage designer by Maggio Musicale Fiorentino and Salzburg Easter Festival, and held several dozen exhibitions. He was awarded a Cité internationale des arts scholarship by the city of Paris in 2005.
