= Alberto Savini =

Italian footballer (born 1999)

Personal information
- Full name: Alberto Piercarlo Savini
- Date of birth: 10 June 1999 (age 27)
- Place of birth: Druento, Italy
- Height: 1.87 m (6 ft 2 in)
- Position: Goalkeeper

Youth career
- –2017: Torino

Senior career*
Years	Team	Apps	(Gls)
2017–2020	Torino	0	(0)
2017–2018	→ GS Arconatese (loan)	28	(0)
2018–2019	→ Savoia (loan)	33	(0)
2019–2020	→ AlbinoLeffe (loan)	13	(0)
2020–2022	AlbinoLeffe	39	(0)
2022–2023	Fidelis Andria	20	(0)
- * Club domestic league appearances and goals as of 23 April 2023

Alberto Piercarlo Savini (born 10 June 1999) is an Italian footballer who plays as a goalkeeper.

== Club career ==
=== Torino ===
Born in Druento, Savini was a youth exponent of Torino.

==== Loan to Arconatese ====
On 19 July 2017, Savini was loaned to Serie D club Arconatese on a season-long loan deal. On 3 September he made his debut for the club in a 2–0 away defeat against Caratese. Three weeks later, on 24 September, he kept his for clean sheet for Arconatese in a 2–0 away win over Derthona. He became Arconatese's first-choice goalkeeper early in the season. On 28 October, Savini kept his second clean sheet in a 1–0 home win against Castellazzo and 3 days later, on 1 November, his third in a 1–0 away win over Seregno. On 29 April 2018, he kept his 10th clean sheet of the season for Arconatese in a 3–0 home win over Bra. Savini ended his season-long loan to Arconatese with 28 appearances, 32 goals conceded and 10 clean sheets.

==== Loan to Savoia ====
On 18 July 2018, Savini was signed by Serie D club Savoia with another season-long loan deal. On 16 September he made his league debut for the club in a 2–0 away defeat against Picerno. One week later, 23 September, he kept his first clean sheet for Savioa, a 0–0 home draw against Francavilla. One more week later, on 30 September, his second in a 1–0 away win over Pomigliano. Savini became Savoia's first-choice keeper early in the season. On 28 October, Savini kept his third clean sheet in a 0–0 away draw against Gragnano. On 13 January 2019, Savini kept his 10th clean sheet of the season in Serie D in a 1–0 away win over Francavilla. Savini ended his second loan in Serie D to Savoia with 34 appearances, 27 goals conceded and 16 clean sheets.

==== Loan to AlbinoLeffe ====
On 25 July 2019, Savini joined Serie C club AlbinoLeffe on a season-long loan. He made his professional Serie C debut for AlbinoLeffe on 25 August 2019 in a season-opening game against Pistoiese. He became AlbinoLeffe's first-choice goalkeeper early in the season. On 15 September he kept his first clean sheet for the club in a 0–0 home draw against Pianese and one week later, on 22 September, his second in a 1–0 away win over Arezzo. On 20 October, Savini kept his third clean sheet for the club, a 2–0 home win over Lecco.

=== AlbinoLeffe ===
On 20 September 2020 he moved to AlbinoLeffe on a permanent basis.

=== Fidelis Andria ===
On 19 August 2022, Savini joined Fidelis Andria.

== Career statistics ==
=== Club ===
As of 4 December 2019

Club	Season	League			Cup		Europe		Other		Total	
Club	Season	League	Apps	Goals	Apps	Goals	Apps	Goals	Apps	Goals	Apps	Goals
Arconatese (loan)	2017–18	Serie D	28	0	0	0	—		—		28	0
Savoia (loan)	2018–19	Serie D	33	0	0	0	—		1 (Note: All appearance(s) in Serie D play-off.)	0	34	0
AlbinoLeffe (loan)	2019–20	Serie C	13	0	0	0	—		—		13	0
Career total			74	0	0	0	—		1	0	75	0
