= Richard Lecomte =

French footballer (born 1964)

Personal information
- Date of birth: 30 March 1964 (age 62)
- Place of birth: Rouen
- Height: 1.83 m (6 ft 0 in)
- Position: Midfielder

Senior career*
Years	Team	Apps	(Gls)
1983–1993	FC Rouen		
1993–1997	EA Guingamp		
1997–1998	Amiens SC		
1998–1999	EA Guingamp		
- * Club domestic league appearances and goals

Richard Lecomte (born 30 March 1964) is a retired French football midfielder.
