= José Dalmao =

Uruguayan footballer (born 1969)

Personal information
- Full name: José Luis Dalmao
- Date of birth: 14 July 1969 (age 57)
- Place of birth: Guichon, Uruguay
- Height: 1.75 m (5 ft 9 in)
- Position: Forward

Senior career*
Years	Team	Apps	(Gls)
–1990	Defensor Sporting		
1991–1992	ES La Rochelle		
1992–1993	Nantes		
1993–1994	USL Dunkerque		
1994–1995	Pau FC		
1995–1996	Nîmes		
1996–1998	FC Sète		
1998–1999	Montauban		
- * Club domestic league appearances and goals

José Luis Dalmao (born 14 July 1969) is a Uruguayan former professional footballer who played as a forward.
