= Jean-Luc Ribar =

French footballer (1965–2022)

Personal information
- Date of birth: 25 February 1965
- Place of birth: Roanne, France
- Date of death: 17 March 2022 (aged 57)
- Position: Attacking midfielder

Senior career*
Years	Team	Apps	(Gls)
1981–1983	Saint-Étienne B		
1983–1987	Saint-Étienne	118	(16)
1987–1988	Lille	18	(1)
1988–1989	Quimper	32	(10)
1989–1995	Rennes	163	(8)
Total		331	(35)
- * Club domestic league appearances and goals

Jean-Luc Ribar (25 February 1965 – 17 March 2022) was a French professional footballer who played as an attacking midfielder.

== Career ==
Born in Roanne, Ribar played for Saint-Étienne B, Saint-Étienne, Lille, Quimper, and Rennes. After retiring in 1996, aged 30, he ran a number of cleaning companies near his hometown of Roanne.
