= Pascal Théault =

French footballer and manager (born 1956)

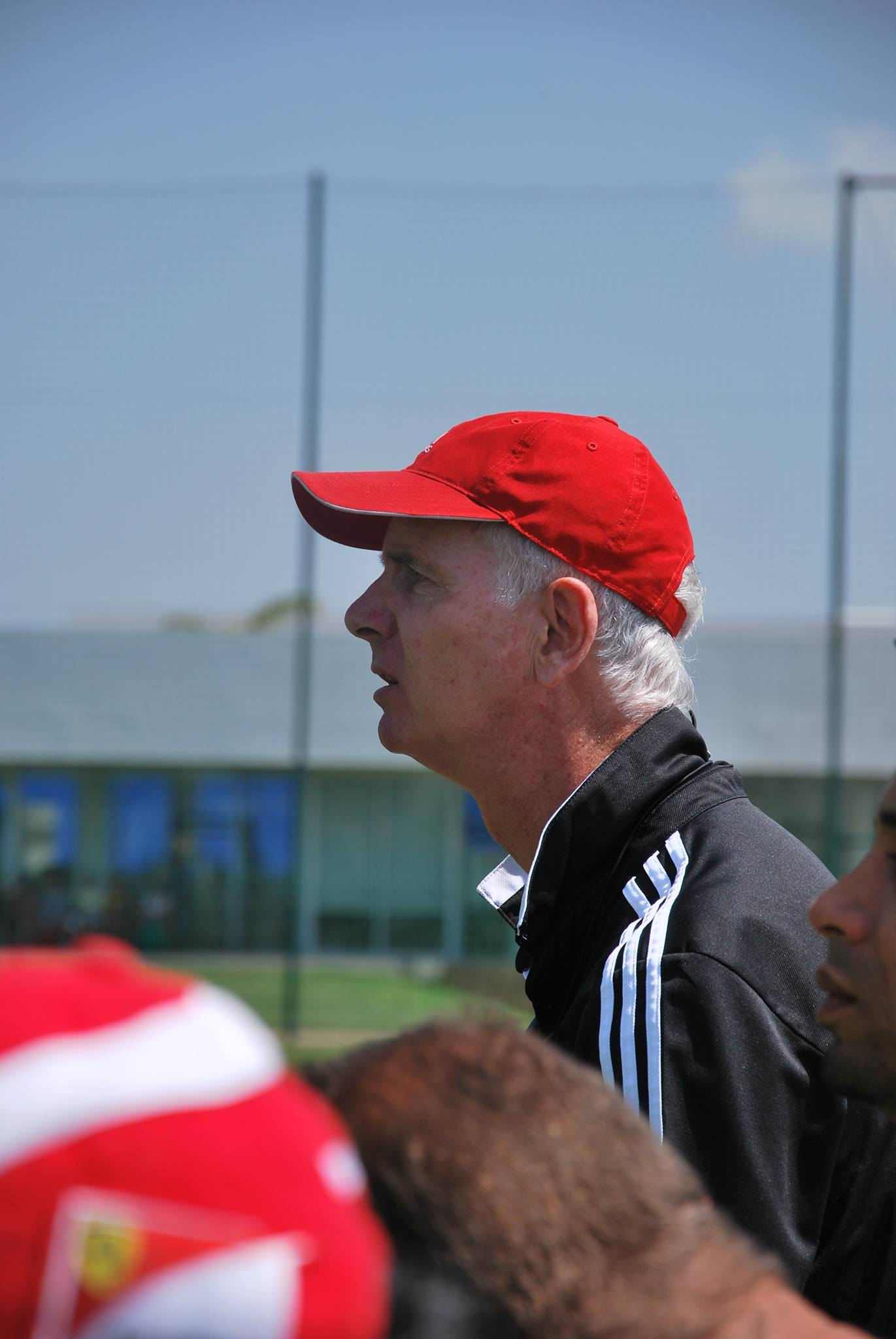
- Théault in 2014

Personal information
- Date of birth: 10 December 1956 (age 69)
- Place of birth: Caen, France
- Position: Midfielder

Senior career*
| Years | Team | Apps | (Gls) |
| 1974–1986 | Caen | | |

Managerial career
- 1988–1992: Caen (assistant manager)
- 1992–1997: Caen (youth development manager)
- 1997–2000: Caen
- 2003–2008: Académie de Sol Beni
- 2010–: Académie Mohammed VI de football
- * Club domestic league appearances and goals

Pascal Théault (born 10 December 1956) is a French former footballer and football manager.

Pascal Théault was contracted to Stade Malherbe Caen for his entire football career, including a role as manager starting in November 2000.

== Biography ==
Théault started at SM Caen in 1964, aged 8. He was captain of the cup-winning youth team in 1973, and played for the first team between 1974 and 1986, becoming the key libéro and captain of the team. In 1984, he was voted best player in Division 2 by the magazine France Football. He spent six of his twelve seasons in Division 2, during which he played 104 games, and scored 3 goals.

At 19, he also began a career as a coach, in parallel with his career as a player. Responsible for the youth team at Stade Malherbe until he became manager from 1992 to 1997, he was responsible for the development of generations of players, including Jérôme Rothen, William Gallas, Bernard Mendy, Grégory Tafforeau, Mathieu Bodmer, David Sommeil, Bill Tchato, Frédéric Née and Anthony Deroin. In November 1997, he was named first-team manager (for which he had been assistant between 1988 and 1992) after a catastrophic first season. He held the role for three seasons. The club finished 5th and 6th in D2 in 1999 and 2000. Graduating in November 2000, he left the club soon afterwards.

Between 2003 and 2008, he was the first-team coach and coach of Académie de Sol Beni, the youth academy of ASEC Mimosas in Côte d'Ivoire. Since 2010 works as Head coach by the Salé based Académie Mohammed VI in Morocco.

== Career ==
=== Player ===
- 1974-1986 : SM Caen

=== Coach ===
- 1976-1988 : youth manager - SM Caen
- 1988-1990 : assistant manager and youth manager - SM Caen
- 1990-1992 : assistant manager - SM Caen
- 1992-nov. 1997 : youth manager - SM Caen
- Nov. 1997-nov. 2000 : manager- SM Caen
- 2003-2008 : manager Académie de Sol Beni

== Honours ==
=== Player ===
- 1973 : winner of youth Coupe de France (SM Caen)
- 1980 : champion of groupe Ouest of division 3
- 1984 : promoted to division 2
- 1984 : voted of player of the year in D2 by France Football
