= Olivier Vandevoorde =

French footballer (born 1969)

Personal information
- Date of birth: 7 August 1969 (age 57)
- Place of birth: Malo-les-Bains, France
- Position: Forward

Senior career*
Years	Team	Apps	(Gls)
1990–1992	USL Dunkerque		
1992–1995	AS Beauvais Oise		
1995–1996	FC Martigues		
1996–1997	Laval		
1997–1999	AS Beauvais Oise		
1999–2001	Angers SCO		
2001–2002	Calais RUFC		
- * Club domestic league appearances and goals

Olivier Vandevoorde (born 7 August 1969) is a retired French football striker.
