= Louis Gomis (footballer, born 1971) =

French footballer

Personal information
- Date of birth: 6 November 1971 (age 54)
- Place of birth: Marseille, France
- Height: 1.78 m (5 ft 10 in)
- Position: Defender

Senior career*
Years	Team	Apps	(Gls)
1988–1990	Nice II		
1990–1997	Nice	63	(1)
1997–1999	Bordeaux	12	(0)
- Bordeaux II
1999–2001	Toulouse	23	(0)
- * Club domestic league appearances and goals

Louis Gomis (born 6 November 1971) is a French former professional footballer who played as a defender. From 1990 to 2001 he made 78 appearances in Ligue 1 and 48 appearances in Ligue 2 for Girondins de Bordeaux, OGC Nice and Toulouse FC.

== Honours ==
Nice

- Coupe de France: 1997
