= Alfonso Savini =

Italian painter (1836–1908)

Alfonso Savini (1836–1908) was an Italian painter, mainly of genre and flower paintings.

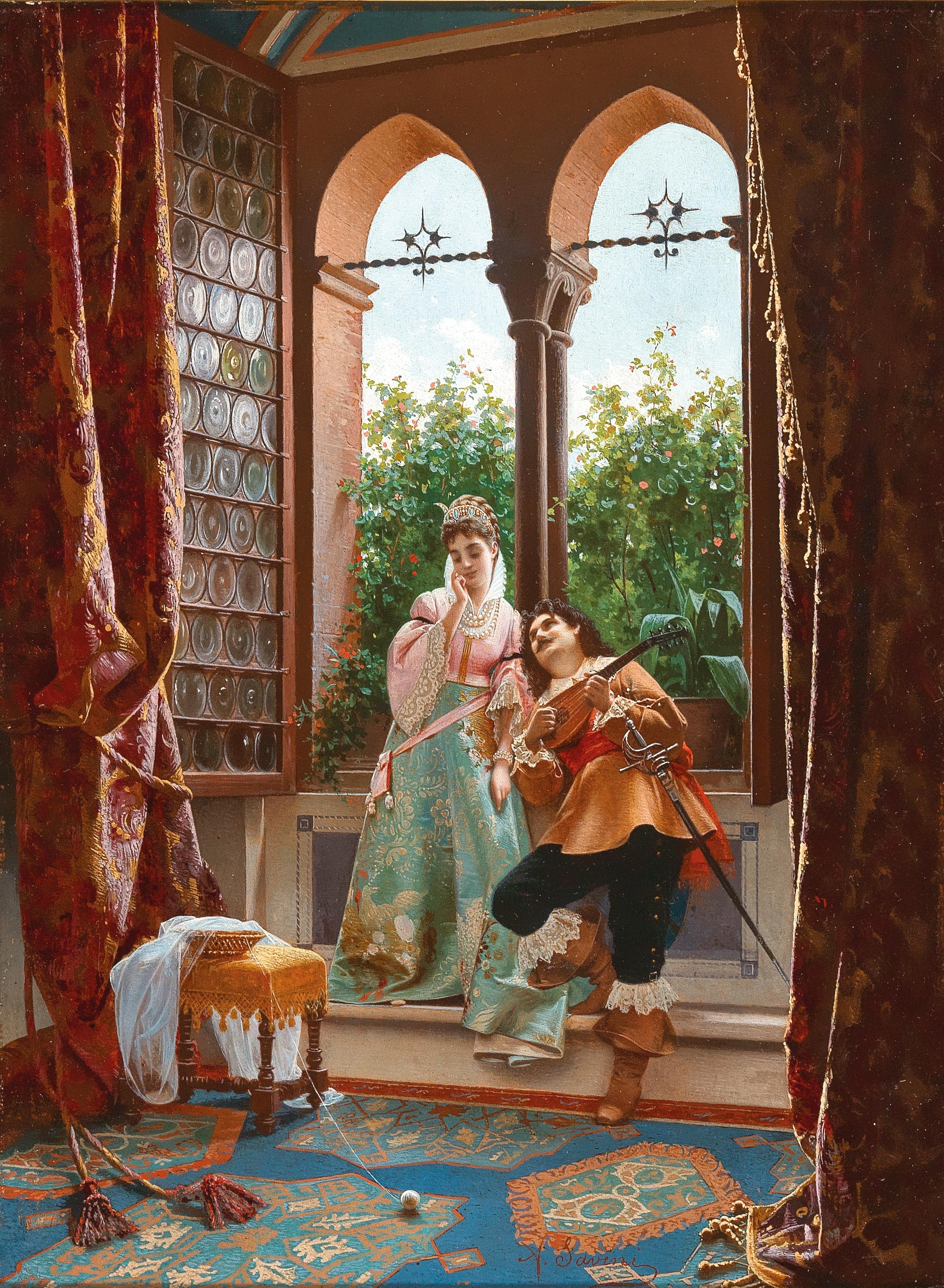
The Serenade at the Museo Ottocento, Bologna

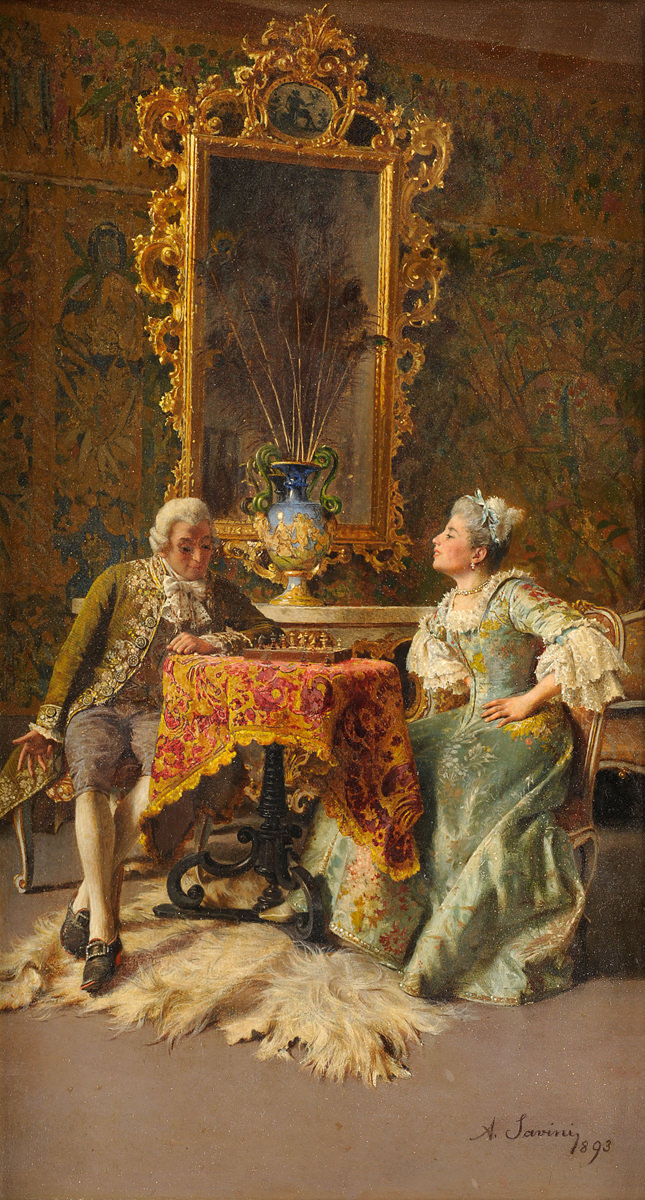
Check Mate the King (1893)

He was a resident in Bologna, and became a professor of the Academy of Fine Arts of Bologna. His son Alfredo was a painter of natural landscapes. In 1884 at the Exhibition of Fine Arts in Turin, he exhibited: Luna di miele; Devota patrizia; Età dei fiori; and Laccio amoroso. In 1884 at Florence, he displayed: Spring flowers and Autumn flowers; Oh come l'amo!...; and Ritorna Primavera. In 1887 at Venice: Aspettando; Suor Maria; Dopo il pranzo; and Riflessioni. In 1888 at Bologna: Fate la pace and Altro tempi. Among his historical subjects were the Neo-Pompeian topic of Nidia e Glauco (circa 1869, from the opera Jone) and the Last moments of Torquato Tasso.
