= Stéphane Mottin =

French footballer and manager (born 1966)

Personal information
- Full name: Stéphane Mottin
- Date of birth: 19 August 1966 (age 60)
- Place of birth: Carentan, France
- Height: 1.75 m (5 ft 9 in)
- Position: Midfielder

Senior career*
Years	Team	Apps	(Gls)
1987–1994	Angers	153	(7)
1994–1995	Clermont	7	(1)
1995–1997	Angers	19	(0)

Managerial career
- 1997–2000: Intrépides Angers
- 2001–2002: Angers
- 2003–2004: Moulins
- 2005–2007: Le Poiré-sur-Vie
- 2010–2012: Avranches
- 2012–2017: Châteaubriant
- 2017–2018: Stade Montois
- 2018–2019: La Roche VF
- * Club domestic league appearances and goals

Stéphane Mottin (born 19 August 1966) is a French former professional footballer who played as a midfielder. He was most recently the manager of Championnat National 3 side La Roche VF.

== Career ==
Mottin spent the majority of his playing career with Angers, making 172 league appearances in nine seasons with the club, including 26 matches in Ligue 1 during the 1993–94 campaign. He also had a spell with Clermont Foot in the 1994–95 season. Following his retirement in 1997, Mottin moved into management with amateur side Intrépides Angers. He left three years later to become youth team director at his former club, Angers. In January 2001, he was appointed manager of the Ligue 2 club following the departure of Denis Goavec, but could not prevent the team's relegation to the Championnat National at the end of the season. Mottin led Angers to a ninth-place finish in the third division the following season, and was subsequently replaced by Éric Guérit in the summer of 2002.

In 2003, Mottin was appointed manager of Championnat de France amateur outfit Moulins. The team finished tenth in their group in 2003–04, and Mottin left the club at the end of the season. A year later, he joined Division d'Honneur Atlantique side Le Poiré-sur-Vie, and led the team to promotion to the Championnat de France amateur 2 in 2006. After leaving Le Poiré-sur-Vie in 2007, Mottin spent three years out of management before being hired by Avranches in the summer of 2010.
