= Youssef Salimi =

Algerian footballer (born 1972)

Youssef Salimi (born August 24, 1972, in Arles, France) is an Algerian former professional footballer who played as a central defender and spent almost his entire career with Nice. (Note: Youssef Salimi – French league stats at LFP – also available in French (archived)) He scored Nice's only goal in their triumphant 1997 Coupe de France final. He finished his career by making one Alpha Ethniki appearance for Ethnikos Asteras during 2000.

== Club career ==
- 1991–1999 OGC Nice
- 2000 Ethnikos Asteras

== Honours ==
Nice

- Coupe de France: 1997
