= Henri Savini =

French footballer (born 1975)

Personal information
- Date of birth: 8 May 1975 (age 51)
- Place of birth: Nice, France
- Height: 1.76 m (5 ft 9 in)
- Position: Midfielder

Senior career*
Years	Team	Apps	(Gls)
1992–1995	Nice II		
1995–2000	Nice		
2000–2002	US Cagnes		

International career
- France U21
- * Club domestic league appearances and goals

Henri Savini (born 8 May 1975) is a French former professional footballer who played as a midfielder.

== Honours ==
Nice

- Coupe de France: 1997
