= Olivier Fugen =

French footballer (born 1970)

Personal information
- Date of birth: 17 October 1970 (age 56)
- Place of birth: Nice, France
- Height: 1.84 m (6 ft 0 in)
- Position: Defender

Senior career*
Years	Team	Apps	(Gls)
1991–1998	Nice		
1998–2001	Troyes		
- * Club domestic league appearances and goals

Olivier Fugen (born 17 October 1970) is a French former professional footballer who played as a defender.

== Honours ==
Nice

- Coupe de France: 1997
