= Arthur Farh =

Liberian footballer

Personal information
- Date of birth: 12 June 1972 (age 54)
- Place of birth: Monrovia, Liberia
- Height: 1.83 m (6 ft 0 in)
- Position: Striker

Senior career*
Years	Team	Apps	(Gls)
1990–1993	Marseille	0	(0)
1992–1993	→ Rennes (loan)	32	(5)
1993–1995	Grenoble	47	(16)
1995–1996	Stuttgarter Kickers	26	(3)
1996–1998	FC Homburg	31	(7)
1999–2001	SV Wilhelmshaven	74	(8)
2001–2002	SC Delmenhorst		

International career
1988–1996	Liberia		
- * Club domestic league appearances and goals

Arthur Farh (born 12 June 1972 in Monrovia) is a Liberian retired professional footballer who played for several clubs in Europe, including Stade Rennais F.C., Stuttgarter Kickers and FC Homburg as well as the Liberia national football team.

== International career ==
Farh made several appearances for the Liberia national team, including four qualifying matches for the 1990 FIFA World Cup. He also played for Liberia at the 1996 African Cup of Nations finals in South Africa.

== Drug smuggling arrest ==
Farh acquired German citizenship while he was playing football in the country, but moved to the United Kingdom after he retired from playing. In January 2011, Farh was charged with drug smuggling after arriving at London Heathrow Airport on a flight from Sint Maarten with cocaine worth £40,000.
