= Christophe Horlaville =

French footballer (born 1969)

Personal information
- Full name: Christophe Horlaville
- Date of birth: 1 March 1969 (age 57)
- Place of birth: Oissel, France
- Height: 1.83 m (6 ft 0 in)
- Position: Forward

Youth career
- 1988: Oissel

Senior career*
Years	Team	Apps	(Gls)
1988–1994	Rouen	140	(49)
1994–1996	Cannes	71	(23)
1996–1997	Guingamp	13	(0)
1997–1998	Le Havre	26	(3)
1998–1999	→ Port Vale (loan)	2	(0)
1998–1999	Metz	9	(2)
1999–2001	Caen	60	(16)
Total		321	(93)
- * Club domestic league appearances and goals

Christophe Horlaville (born 1 March 1969) is a French former professional footballer who had a 13-year career with Oissel, Rouen, Cannes, Guingamp, Le Havre, Port Vale (England), Metz, and Caen.

Whilst with Guingamp, he won the UEFA Intertoto Cup in 1996 and played in the final of the Coupe de France in 1997.

== Career ==
Horlaville moved from local side Oissel to Arnaud Dos Santos's Rouen in 1988. The "Red Devils" finished 11th in Group A of Division 2 in 1988–89, then third in Group B in 1989–90, fifth in Group B in 1990–91, seventh in Group A in 1991–92, third in group B in 1992–93, and then 19th in the amalgamated Division 2 in 1993–94 as they suffered relegation. He left Stade Robert Diochon, and signed with Division 1 side Cannes in 1994. He was the club's top-scorer with 11 league goals in 1994–95 as they achieved a mid-table finish under Safet Sušić's stewardship. He then scored 12 league goals in 1995–96 to help steer Guy Lacombe's "Red Dragons" away from the relegation zone.

Horlaville joined Guingamp in 1996 and helped the Francis Smerecki's side to win the 1996 UEFA Intertoto Cup, scoring a goal in the first leg of the final against Rotor Volgograd. He also played at Parc des Princes in defeat to Nice in the final of the Coupe de France; he converted his penalty in the shoot-out, though Nice won 5–4. However, they failed to bring this success into the league, finishing 12th in 1996–97. He departed Stade de Roudourou for Le Havre, who went on to finish eighth in 1997–98 under the stewardship of Denis Troch.

Horlaville played two months in the First Division of the English Football League on loan with John Rudge's Port Vale in the 1998–99 season. He made his debut at Vale Park as a 68th-minute substitute for Robin Berntsen on 14 November, in a 2–0 defeat to Sunderland. He made his first start for the "Valiants" seven days later in a 2–1 defeat to Oxford United at the Manor Ground. On 3 January, he played as a substitute in a 3–0 defeat to Liverpool in the FA Cup, in what was his last game for the club.

He returned to France to play for Joël Müller's Metz, who finished tenth in Division 1 in 1998–99. He then left Stade Saint-Symphorien to play for Caen. Pascal Théault led the club to a sixth-place finish in Division 2 in 1999–2000, before new boss Jean-Louis Gasset led Caen to 17th place in 2000–01. He left the professional game after leaving Stade Michel d'Ornano.

== Personal life ==
He is the son of former France international Daniel Horlaville. After retiring from playing himself, he became a football player's agent.

== Career statistics ==
Appearances and goals by club, season and competition
Club	Season	League			National cup (Note: Includes Coupe de France, FA Cup)		League cup (Note: Includes Coupe de la Ligue, Football League Cup)		Total	
Club	Season	Division	Apps	Goals	Apps	Goals	Apps	Goals	Apps	Goals
Rouen	1988–89	Division 2	16	1	1	1	0	0	17	2
Rouen	1989–90	Division 2	6	1	0	0	0	0	6	1
Rouen	1990–91	Division 2	17	5	1	0	0	0	18	5
Rouen	1991–92	Division 2	31	15	1	0	0	0	32	15
Rouen	1992–93	Division 2	29	13	3	1	0	0	32	14
Rouen	1993–94	Division 2	41	14	1	0	0	0	42	14
Rouen	Total		140	49	7	2	0	0	147	51
Cannes	1994–95	Division 1	36	11	4	3	2	0	42	14
Cannes	1995–96	Division 1	35	12	4	3	2	0	41	15
Cannes	Total		71	23	8	6	4	0	83	29
Guingamp	1996–97	Division 1	13	0	8	3	5	1	26	4
Le Havre	1997–98	Division 1	26	3	0	0	2	0	28	3
Port Vale (loan)	1998–99	First Division	2	0	1	0	0	0	3	0
Metz	1998–99	Division 1	9	2	0	0	5	1	14	3
Caen	1999–2000	Division 2	31	10	0	0	1	0	32	10
Caen	2000–01	Division 2	29	6	0	0	3	0	32	6
Caen	Total		60	16	0	0	4	0	64	16
Career total			321	93	24	11	20	2	365	106

== Honours ==
Guingamp

- UEFA Intertoto Cup: 1996
- Coupe de France runner-up: 1997
