= Frédéric Tatarian =

French footballer (born 1970)

Personal information
- Date of birth: 30 December 1970 (age 55)
- Place of birth: Marseille, France
- Height: 1.78 m (5 ft 10 in)
- Position: Midfielder

Youth career
- 1978–1980: US Le Rouet
- 1980–1990: Marseille

Senior career*
Years	Team	Apps	(Gls)
1990–1992	Marseille	0	(0)
1992–1994	Mulhouse	62	(10)
1994–1995	Nice	28	(2)
1995–1996	Marseille	22	(0)
1996–1997	Nice	32	(1)
1997	Marseille	0	(0)
1997–1998	Toulon	34	(3)
1998–2000	Nice	64	(2)
2000–2002	Créteil	50	(7)
2002–2003	Martigues	25	(0)
2003–2004	FC Sion		
2004–2005	Cannes	15	(1)
- * Club domestic league appearances and goals

Frédéric Tatarian (born 30 December 1970) is a French former professional footballer who played as a midfielder.

== Honours ==
Nice

- Coupe de France: 1997
