= Claude Michel (footballer) =

French footballer (born 1971)

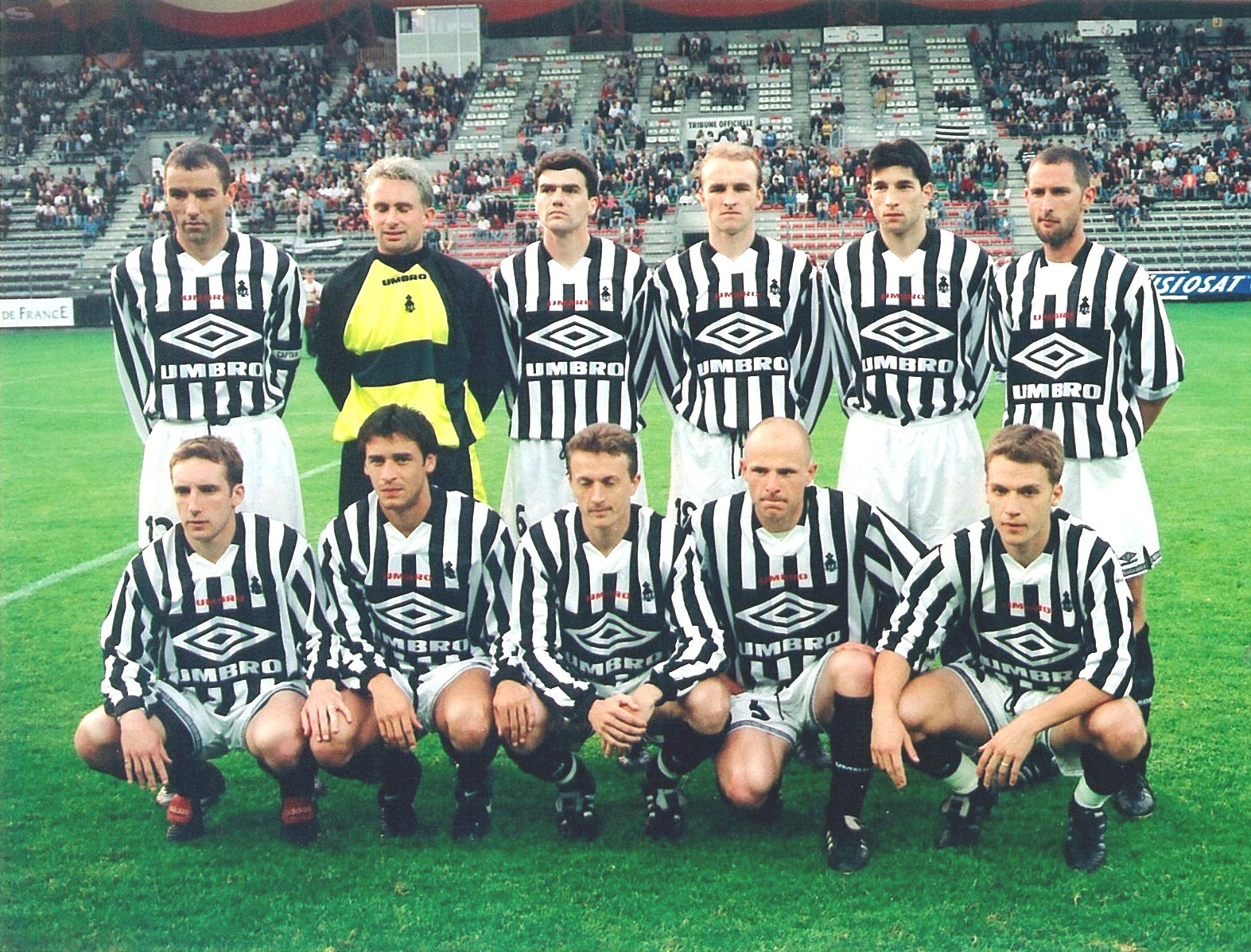

Personal information
- Date of birth: 24 April 1971 (age 55)
- Place of birth: Carhaix-Plouguer
- Height: 1.70 m (5 ft 7 in)
- Position: Midfielder

Senior career*
Years	Team	Apps	(Gls)
1992–2005	EA Guingamp		
- * Club domestic league appearances and goals

Claude Michel (born 24 April 1971) is a retired French football midfielder.

== Career ==
Michel started his career with EA Guingamp.
