= Yannick Baret =

French footballer (born 1972)

Personal information
- Date of birth: 20 December 1972 (age 53)
- Place of birth: Rambervillers, France
- Height: 1.78 m (5 ft 10 in)
- Position: Midfielder

Senior career*
Years	Team	Apps	(Gls)
1991–1992	SAS Épinal		
1992–1995	AS Monaco FC		
1995–2002	EA Guingamp		
2003	FC Lorient		
2004–2005	Lannion		
- * Club domestic league appearances and goals

Yannick Baret (born 20 December 1972) is a retired French football midfielder.
