= Olivier Pickeu =

French footballer (born 1970)

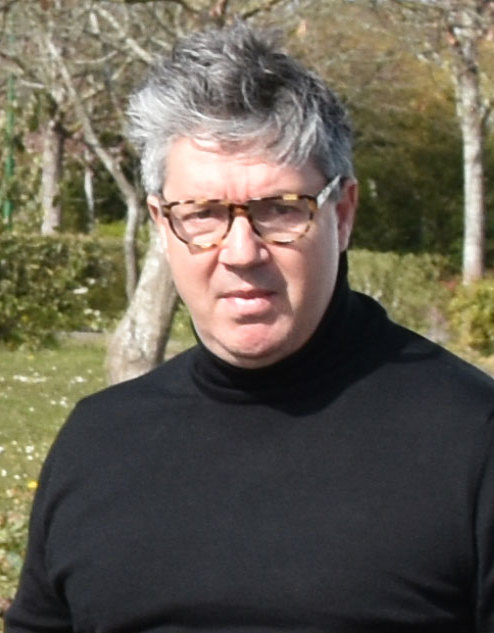

Personal information
- Date of birth: 24 February 1970 (age 55)
- Place of birth: Armentières, France
- Height: 1.80 m (5 ft 11 in)
- Position: Forward

Senior career*
| Years | Team | Apps | (Gls) |
| 1989-1993 | SM Caen | 35 | (4) |
| 1990-1991 | → Tours FC | 32 | (6) |
| 1992-1993 | → Montpellier HSC | 30 | (8) |
| 1993-1995 | Toulouse FC | 47 | (8) |
| 1995-1998 | Amiens SC | 118 | (46) |
| 1998-1999 | Lille OSC | 34 | (7) |
| 1999-2001 | Le Mans UC | 45 | (9) |
| 2001-2002 | Varzim SC | 12 | (1) |
| 2002-2003 | Stade de Reims | 25 | (1) |
- * Club domestic league appearances and goals

Olivier Pickeu (born 24 February 1970) is a French retired football forward.

Pickeu started his playing career at Stade Malherbe Caen. He later played at FC Tours and Montpellier HSC (on loan from Caen), Toulouse FC, Amiens SC, Lille OSC, Le Mans Union Club 72, Varzim SC in Portugal, and then Stade de Reims.

After his playing career ended, Pickeu joined the Angers SCO as general manager / sporting director. From 2006 to 2020, he was instrumental in the successes of his club, as it gradually moves from the Championnat National to the middle of Ligue 1. He was laid off in 2020.

He was appointed as Stade Malherbe Caen chairman in 2020, after club takeover by US fund Oaktree Capital Management.

== Honours ==
=== Player ===
Montpellier

- Coupe de la Ligue: 1991–92
