= Walquir Mota =

Brazilian footballer (born 1967)

Personal information
- Full name: Walquir Mota
- Date of birth: August 18, 1967 (age 59)
- Place of birth: Patos de Minas, Brazil
- Height: 1.85 m (6 ft 1 in)
- Position: Striker

Senior career*
Years	Team	Apps	(Gls)
1987–1988	Mulhouse	0	(0)
1988–1989	Rodez	18	(6)
1989–1991	Beauvais	55	(13)
1991–1992	Tours	31	(18)
1992–1994	Lille	22	(0)
1994–1995	Valence	30	(7)
1995–1998	Chamois Niortais	108	(31)
1998–1999	RCF Paris	17	(6)
1999–2000	Paris FC	28	(4)
2001–2004	Saint-Leu	?	(?)
- * Club domestic league appearances and goals

Walquir Mota (born August 18, 1967) is a Brazilian former professional footballer who played as a striker.
