= Nicolas Laspalles =

French footballer (born 1971)

Personal information
- Full name: Nicolas Laspalles
- Date of birth: 27 November 1971 (age 54)
- Place of birth: Montargis, France
- Height: 1.82 m (6 ft 0 in)
- Position: Defender

Youth career
- US Montargis

Senior career*
Years	Team	Apps	(Gls)
1992–1998	Guingamp	189	(4)
1998–2000	Paris Saint-Germain	30	(0)
1999	→Lens (loan)	15	(1)
2000–2003	Nantes	87	(1)
2003	Lecce	5	(0)
2003–2004	Guingamp	35	(1)
- * Club domestic league appearances and goals

Nicolas Laspalles (born 27 November 1971) is a retired French footballer who played as a defender. He was a stalwart in Ligue 1, best known for his stints in Guingamp, Paris Saint-Germain, and Nantes.

== Club career ==
Laspalles begun his professional career with Guingamp, and in his first two years they were promoted twice into the Ligue 1. He moved to Paris Saint-Germain after Guingamp got relegated in 1998. He then joined FC Nantes, winning the 2000–01 French Division 1 in his first season there. At the end of his career, he moved to U.S. Lecce, but after 6 months returned to Guingamp to finish his career and gain coaching experience.

== Personal life ==
Nicolas' son, Roman Laspalles, followed in his father's footsteps and is a professional footballer as well.

== Honours ==
=== Club ===
Guingamp

- UEFA Intertoto Cup: 1996

RC Lens

- Coupe de la Ligue: 1999

FC Nantes

- French Division 1: 2000–01
- Trophée Des Champions: 2001
