= Stéphane Carnot =

French footballer (born 1972)

Personal information
- Date of birth: 10 July 1972 (age 54)
- Place of birth: Quimper, France
- Height: 1.72 m (5 ft 8 in)
- Position: Midfielder

Senior career*
Years	Team	Apps	(Gls)
1992–1997	En Avant Guingamp	168	(31)
1997–1998	AS Monaco FC	21	(3)
1998–2000	AJ Auxerre	65	(8)
2000–2005	En Avant Guingamp	102	(17)
2005–2006	L'Entente SSG	30	(4)
- * Club domestic league appearances and goals

Stéphane Carnot (French: [stefan kaʁno]; born 10 July 1972) is a former French footballer who played as a midfielder.

Carnot played in Jean Tigana's Monaco side which defeated Manchester United knocking them out of the Champions League in 1998 on away goals after a 1–1 draw at Old Trafford. Whilst at Guingamp he won the 1996 UEFA Intertoto Cup, scoring the decisive goal in the second leg of the final against FC Rotor Volgograd.

== Personal life ==
Carnot is the father of the footballer Louis Carnot.

== Honours ==
- UEFA Intertoto Cup: 1996
- Trophée des Champions: 1997
