= Samuel Lobé =

French footballer (born 1967)

Personal information
- Date of birth: 7 March 1967 (age 59)
- Place of birth: Caen, France
- Height: 1.86 m (6 ft 1 in)
- Position: Forward

Senior career*
Years	Team	Apps	(Gls)
1984–1986	Nancy		
1986–1987	Gazélec Ajaccio		
1987–1988	Nancy		
1988–1990	Dijon		
1990–1991	FC Bourges		
1992–1993	US Créteil		
1993–1994	Rouen		
1994–1996	Laval		
1996–1997	US Créteil		
1997–1998	Lille		
1998–2000	Troyes		
2000–2001	FC Martigues		
2001–2002	Red Star		

Managerial career
- 2004–2005: AS Orly
- * Club domestic league appearances and goals

Samuel Lobé (born 7 March 1967) is a French former professional footballer who played as a forward.
