= 1977–78 SEC Bastia season =

SEC Bastia
1977–78 season
- Chairman: Paul Natali
- Manager: Pierre Cahuzac
- Stadium: Stade Armand Cesari
- Division 1: 5th
- Coupe de France: Quarter-finals
- UEFA Cup: Final
- Top goalscorer: League: Johnny Rep (18); All: Johnny Rep (22)
- Highest home attendance: 6,874 vs Reims (19 August 1977)
- Lowest home attendance: 2,800 vs Nîmes (28 October 1977)
Home colours	Away colours	Third colours

French football club SEC Bastia's 1977–78 season. Finished 5th place in league. Top scorer of the season, including 22 goals in 18 league matches have been Johnny Rep. Was eliminated to Coupe de France quarter-finals, the UEFA Cup was able to be among the finals.

== Transfers ==
=== In ===
Summer

- Félix Lacuesta from St. Etienne
- Jean-François Larios from St. Etienne
- Dominique Vésir from St. Etienne
- Johnny Rep from Valencia
- Yves Mariot from Lyon

Winter

- Pierrick Hiard from Rennes

=== Out ===
Summer

- Dragan Džajić to Red Star Belgrade
- Jean-Louis Luccini to Auxerre
- José Pasqualetti to Olympique Ales
- Jacques Zimako to St. Etienne

== Squad ==
Note: Flags indicate national team as defined under FIFA eligibility rules; some limited exceptions apply. Players may hold more than one non-FIFA nationality.

No.	Pos.	Nation	Player
—	GK	YUG	Ognjen Petrović
—	GK	FRA	Marc Weller
—	GK	FRA	Pierrick Hiard
—	GK	FRA	Dominique Murati
—	DF	FRA	André Guesdon
—	DF	FRA	Jean-Louis Cazes
—	DF	FRA	Charles Orlanducci
—	DF	FRA	Paul Marchioni
—	DF	FRA	André Burkhard
—	DF	FRA	José Graziani
—	DF	FRA	Jean-Pierre Mattei
—	DF	FRA	Didier Knayer
—	MF	FRA	José Pastinelli
—	MF	FRA	Jean-Louis Desvignes

No.	Pos.	Nation	Player
—	MF	FRA	Claude Papi
—	MF	FRA	Jean-François Larios
—	MF	FRA	Pierre Aussu
—	MF	FRA	Félix Lacuesta
—	MF	FRA	Georges Franceschetti
—	MF	FRA	Dominique Vésir
—	FW	NED	Johnny Rep
—	FW	MAR	Merry Krimau
—	FW	FRA	Yves Mariot
—	FW	FRA	François Félix
—	FW	FRA	Jean-Marie De Zerbi
—	FW	FRA	Georges Ventura
—	FW	FRA	Sauveur Agostini

== Division 1 ==
=== League table ===
Pos	Team	Pld	W	D	L	GF	GA	GD	Pts	Qualification or relegation
3	Strasbourg	38	19	12	7	70	40	+30	50	Qualification to UEFA Cup first round
4	Marseille	38	20	7	11	70	41	+29	47	
5	Bastia	38	19	6	13	62	44	+18	44	
6	Nancy	38	17	9	12	63	49	+14	43	Qualification to Cup Winners' Cup first round (Note: Nancy qualified for 1978–79 European Cup Winners' Cup as winners of the 1977–78 Coupe de France.)
7	Saint-Étienne	38	18	6	14	50	49	+1	42	

Source: Histoire du PSG
Rules for classification: 1) points; 2) goal difference; 3) number of goals scored.
Victory: 2 points, Draw: 1 point, Defeat: 0 points

=== Results summary ===
Overall								Home						Away					
Pld	W	D	L	GF	GA	GD	Pts	W	D	L	GF	GA	GD	W	D	L	GF	GA	GD
38	19	6	13	62	44	+18	63	15	2	2	43	14	+29	4	4	11	19	30	−11

Source: worldfootball.net

=== Results by round ===
Round	1	2	3	4	5	6	7	8	9	10	11	12	13	14	15	16	17	18	19	20	21	22	23	24	25	26	27	28	29	30	31	32	33	34	35	36	37	38
Ground	H	H	A	H	A	H	A	H	A	H	A	H	A	H	H	A	H	A	A	H	A	H	A	A	H	A	H	A	H	H	A	H	A	H	A	H	A	A
Result	L	L	L	W	D	W	L	W	L	W	L	W	L	W	W	L	W	D	L	W	W	W	L	W	W	L	D	D	D	W	L	W	W	W	W	W	L	D
Position	18	18	19	17	16	13	16	14	15	12	15	13	15	12	10	10	10	9	10	10	9	8	8	8	8	9	10	10	10	10	9	10	9	7	5	5	5	5

A = Away; H = Home; W = Win; D = Draw; L = Loss

=== Matches ===
Date	Opponent	H / A	Result	Goal(s)	Attendance
3 August 1977	AS Monaco	H	0 - 2		5,850
8 August 1977	Bordeaux	H	1 - 2	Papi 17'	6,010
16 August 1977	Nancy	A	3 - 0		16,797
19 August 1977	Reims	H	3 - 0	Rep 15', Papi 22' (pen.), 47' (pen.)	6,874
30 August 1977	Strasbourg	A	1 - 1	Papi 89'	19,915
3 September 1977	Lyon	H	2 - 1	Lacuesta 41', Orlanducci 86'	5,600
9 September 1977	Marseille	A	2 - 0		30,757
17 September 1977	Valenciennes	H	3 - 0	Rep 17', 72', Félix 83'	2,900
24 September 1977	Nantes	A	2 - 0		15,524
1 October 1977	Rouen	H	3 - 2	Rep 11', 67', Desvignes 89'	3,650
11 October 1977	Troyes	A	1 - 0		5,600
14 October 1977	Metz	H	2 - 0	Papi 26', Félix 90'	3,000
22 October 1977	Sochaux	A	2 - 0		8,579
28 October 1977	Nîmes	H	2 - 1	Papi 53', Rep 75'	2,800
9 November 1977	Laval	H	1 - 0	De Zerbi 38'	2,901
19 November 1977	Nice	A	3 - 1	Larios 61'	14,694
26 November 1977	St. Etienne	H	2 - 0	Krimau 70', Rep 75'	3,683
30 November 1977	Paris SG	A	3 - 3	Rep 65', 82', Papi 73' (pen.)	22,872
3 December 1977	Bordeaux	A	1 - 0		8,135
10 December 1977	Nancy	H	1 - 0	Papi 67'	4,375
17 December 1977	Reims	A	1 - 3	Larios 15', 63', Rep 42'	7,685
7 January 1978	Strasbourg	H	3 - 1	Rep 47', Krimau 71', Lacuesta 89'	3,853
14 January 1978	Lyon	A	2 - 1	Papi 14'	14,294
18 January 1978	Lens	A	3 - 4	Rep 23', 79', 85', Krimau 45'	13,013
21 January 1978	Marseille	H	2 - 0	Papi 21', Krimau 70'	4,850
3 February 1978	Valenciennes	A	2 - 0		6,816
11 February 1978	Nantes	H	0 - 0		3,811
4 March 1978	Metz	A	0 - 0		5,599
11 March 1978	Sochaux	H	0 - 0		3,190
25 March 1978	Nîmes	A	2 - 0		9,164
1 April 1978	Troyes	H	6 - 0	Rep 4', Franceschetti 20', Larios 47', Papi 65', 70', Félix 84'	3,597
5 April 1978	Lens	H	3 - 1	Krimau 35', Larios 42', Papi 83'	3,500
8 April 1978	Laval	A	0 - 1	Aussu 41'	12,721
21 April 1978	Nice	H	4 - 1	Mariot 3', Aussu 27', 56', Krimau 49'	3,014
29 April 1978	St. Etienne	A	0 - 4	Cazes 28', De Zerbi 51', Krimau 59', Rep 89'	23,250
4 May 1978	Paris SG	H	5 - 3	Papi ?', ?', Rep ?', Félix ?', De Zerbi ?'	6,000
6 May 1978	AS Monaco	A	2 - 1	Rep ?'	2,500
12 May 1978	Rouen	A	0 - 0		?

== Coupe de France ==
End of 64

- 7 February 1978: Bastia 3 - 1 Cannes

Bastia won 3 - 1 on aggregate.

End of 32

- 25 February 1978 (1. match): Strasbourg 0 - 3 Bastia
- 7 March 1978 (2. match): Bastia 0 - 0 Strasbourg

Bastia won 3 - 0 on aggregate.

End of 16

- 18 March 1978 (1. match): Reims 0 - 1 Bastia
- 22 March 1978 (2. match): Bastia 2 - 1 Reims

Bastia won 3 - 1 on aggregate.

Quarter-final

- 15 April 1978 (1. match): Bastia 2 - 1 AS Monaco
- 18 April 1978 (2. match): AS Monaco 2 - 0 Bastia

AS Monaco won 3 - 2 on aggregate.

== UEFA Cup ==
=== First round ===
14 September 1977

SEC Bastia (France)	3 – 2	(Portugal) Sporting CP
Félix 52' 76' 84'		Jordão 40' (pen.); Fraguito 58'

Stade Armand Cesari, Furiani
Attendance: 6,000

28 September 1977

Sporting CP (Portugal)	1 – 2	(France) SEC Bastia
Fernandes 72'		Rep 86'; Félix 88'

Estádio José Alvalade, Lisbon
Attendance: 60,000

Bastia won 5–3 on aggregate.

=== Second round ===
19 October 1977

SEC Bastia (France)	2 – 1	(England) Newcastle United F.C.
Papi 51' 89'		Cannell 8'

Stade Armand Cesari, Furiani
Attendance: 8,403

2 November 1977

Newcastle United F.C. (England)	1 – 3	(France) SEC Bastia
Gowling 36'		de Zerbi 3'; Rep 8' 67'

St James' Park, Newcastle upon Tyne
Attendance: 34,580

Bastia won 5–2 on aggregate.

=== Third round ===
23 November 1977

SEC Bastia (France)	2 – 1	(Italy) Torino
Papi 37'; Rep 63'		Pulici 24'

Stade Armand Cesari, Furiani
Attendance: 9,743

7 December 1977

Torino (Italy)	2 – 3	(France) SEC Bastia
Graziani 22' 47'		Larios 19'; Krimau 50' 65'

Stadio Comunale, Turin
Attendance: 70,000

Bastia won 5–3 on aggregate.

=== Quarter final ===
1 March 1978

SEC Bastia (France)	7 – 2	(East Germany) FC Carl Zeiss Jena
Larios 3'; Papi 41'; Mariot 57'; Félix 70' 78'; Cazes 80'; Franceschetti 87'		Raab 61' 73'

Stade Armand Cesari, Furiani
Attendance: 12,000

15 March 1978

FC Carl Zeiss Jena (East Germany)	4 – 2	(France) SEC Bastia
Raab 20'; Lindemann 33'; Vogel 52'; Töpfer 68' (pen.)		Papi 26'; Krimau 64'

Ernst-Abbe-Sportfeld, Jena
Attendance: 15,000

Bastia won 9–6 on aggregate.

=== Semi final ===
29 March 1978

Grasshopper Club Zürich (Switzerland)	3–2	(France) SEC Bastia
Hermann 22'; Ponte 31'; Montandon 54'	Report	Krimau 18'; Papi 37'

Hardturm, Zürich
Attendance: 29,000
Referee: Carpenter

12 April 1978

SEC Bastia (France)	1–0	(Switzerland) Grasshopper Club Zürich
Papi 67'	Report

Stade Furiani, Bastia
Attendance: 14,000
Referee: Partridge

Bastia won 3–3 on away goals.

=== Final ===
1978-04-26

SEC Bastia (France)	0 – 0	(Netherlands) PSV Eindhoven

Stade Armand Cesari, Bastia
Attendance: 15,000
Referee: Dusall Maksimovic (Yugoslavia)

1978-05-09

PSV Eindhoven (Netherlands)	3 – 0	(France) SEC Bastia
W. van de Kerkhof 24'; Deijkers 67' van der Kuijlen 69'

Philips Stadion, Eindhoven
Attendance: 27,000
Referee: Nicolae Rainea (Romania)

PSV Eindhoven wins 3–0 on aggregate
