= 1985–86 SEC Bastia season =

SEC Bastia
1985–86 season
- Chairman: Joseph Gentile
- Manager: Alain Moizan; Antoine Redin (from February 1986)
- Stadium: Stade Armand Cesari
- Division 1: 20th (Relegated to Division 2)
- Coupe de France: End of 32
- Top goalscorer: League: Jean-Roch Testa (7); All: Jean-Roch Testa (8)
- Highest home attendance: 7,000 vs Paris SG (16 July 1985)
- Lowest home attendance: 600 vs Nancy (18 April 1986)
Home colours	Away colours

French football club SEC Bastia's 1985–86 season. Finished 20th place in league and relegated to Division 2. Top scorer of the season, including 8 goals in 7 league matches have been Jean-Roch Testa. Was eliminated to Coupe de France end of 32.

== Transfers ==
In

In
Jean-Marc Furlan from Tours
Michel Furic from Nantes
Félix Lacuesta from Lyon
Patrick Cubaynes from Nîmes
Gérard Soler from Strasbourg

Out

Out
Simei Ihily to Nîmes
Józef Młynarczyk to Porto
Bernard Ferrigno to Quimper
Louis Marcialis to Nancy
Jacques Zimako to retired
Gérard Soler and Patrick Cubaynes to Lille
Paul Squaglia Lyon
Félix Lacuesta to AS Monaco

== Squad ==
Note: Flags indicate national team as defined under FIFA eligibility rules; some limited exceptions apply. Players may hold more than one non-FIFA nationality.

No.	Pos.	Nation	Player
—	GK	POL	Józef Młynarczyk
—	GK	FRA	Thierry Jallamion
—	GK	FRA	Vincent Liotta
—	GK	FRA	Dominique Murati
—	DF	FRA	Jean-André Ottaviani
—	DF	FRA	César Nativi
—	DF	FRA	Charles Orlanducci
—	DF	FRA	Paul Marchioni
—	DF	FRA	Antoine Cervetti
—	DF	FRA	Jean-Marc Furlan
—	DF	FRA	Maurice Arouh
—	DF	FRA	Paul Squaglia
—	MF	FRA	José Pastinelli
—	MF	FRA	Michel Furic

No.	Pos.	Nation	Player
—	MF	ESP	Daniel Solsona
—	MF	FRA	Michel Padovani
—	MF	FRA	Alain Moizan
—	MF	FRA	Laurent Moracchini
—	MF	FRA	Félix Lacuesta
—	MF	FRA	Philippe Levenard
—	MF	FRA	Antoine Spinelli
—	MF	FRA	Alain Bordin
—	FW	FRA	Patrick Cubaynes
—	FW	FRA	Gérard Soler
—	FW	FRA	Thierry Meyer
—	FW	FRA	Marc Biamonte
—	FW	FRA	Jean-Roch Testa

=== Statistics ===
Matches

Match
35: Furic
33: Furlan
31: Ottaviani
28: Nativi
22: Młynarczyk, Solsona
21: Meyer, Soler
19: Moizan
17: Cervetti, Lacuesta, Testa
15: Cubaynes
13: Marchioni
12: Jallamion
10: Squaglia
9: Biamonte
7: Padovani
6: Moracchini
3: Murati, Arouh, Orlanducci, Bordin, Spinelli
1: Liotta

Goals

Goals
7: Testa
6: Soler
4: Cubaynes, Meyer
2: Furic
1: Furlan, Ottaviani, Pastinelli, Solsona

== Division 1 ==
=== League table ===
Pos	Team	Pld	W	D	L	GF	GA	GD	Pts	Qualification or relegation
16	Toulon	38	9	15	14	43	46	−3	33	
17	Le Havre	38	11	11	16	49	53	−4	33	
18	Nancy (O)	38	13	7	18	45	51	−6	33	Qualification to relegation play-offs
19	Strasbourg (R)	38	10	11	17	36	54	−18	31	Relegation to French Division 2
20	Bastia (R)	38	5	10	23	30	79	−49	20	Relegation to French Division 2

Source: Histoire du PSG
Rules for classification: 1) points; 2) goal difference; 3) number of goals scored.
Victory: 2 points, Draw: 1 point, Defeat: 0 points
(O) Play-off winners; (R) Relegated

=== Results summary ===
Overall								Home						Away					
Pld	W	D	L	GF	GA	GD	Pts	W	D	L	GF	GA	GD	W	D	L	GF	GA	GD
38	5	10	23	30	79	−49	25	5	6	8	17	24	−7	0	4	15	13	55	−42

Source: worldfootball.net

=== Results by round ===
Round	1	2	3	4	5	6	7	8	9	10	11	12	13	14	15	16	17	18	19	20	21	22	23	24	25	26	27	28	29	30	31	32	33	34	35	36	37	38
Ground	H	A	H	A	H	A	H	A	H	H	A	H	A	H	A	H	A	H	A	H	A	H	A	H	A	H	A	A	H	H	A	A	H	A	H	A	H	A
Result	L	L	L	L	W	L	D	L	W	D	L	W	D	W	D	D	L	W	L	L	L	L	D	D	L	D	L	L	L	L	D	L	L	L	L	L	D	L
Position	18	20	20	20	20	20	20	20	20	20	20	20	20	16	16	16	17	15	17	19	19	19	19	19	19	19	20	20	20	20	20	20	20	20	20	20	20	20

A = Away; H = Home; W = Win; D = Draw; L = Loss

=== Matches ===
Win (W), Draw (D), Lost (L).

1. 16 July 1985, "Bastia" 2-4 Paris SG, 7,000 (L)

Meyer 70' (pen.), Soler 74'

2. 19 July 1985, Lens 6-0 "Bastia", 12,700 (L)

-

3. 26 July 1985, "Bastia" 0-2 Rennes, 2,448 (L)

-

4. 30 July 1985, Nantes 2-0 "Bastia", 14,957 (L)

-

5. 2 August 1985, "Bastia" 2-1 Toulon, 3,500 (W)

Soler 34', Furic 56'

6. 9 August 1985, Sochaux 2-0 "Bastia", 812, (L)

-

7. 16 August 1985, "Bastia" 0-0 AS Monaco, 5,000 (D)

-

8. 24 August 1985, Metz 3-0 "Bastia", 11,626 (L)

-

9. 30 August 1985, "Bastia" 2-0 Strasbourg, 3,500 (W)

Cubaynes 83', 86'

10. 3 September 1985, "Bastia" 0-0 Auxerre, 1,620 (D)

-

11. 14 September 1985, Toulouse 3-1 "Bastia", 10,315 (L)

Meyer 88'

12. 21 September 1985, "Bastia" 2-0 Lille, 2,500 (W)

Cubaynes 52', Soler 71'

13. 27 September 1985, Bordeaux 2-2 "Bastia", 16,000 (D)

Meyer 34', Solosna 83'

14. 5 October 1985, "Bastia" 2-1 Le Havre, 1,517 (W)

Soler 41', 50'

15. 11 October 1985, Marseille 0-0 "Bastia", 12,031 (D)

-

16. 18 October 1985, "Bastia" 0-0 Laval, 1,049 (D)

-

17. 25 October 1985, Nice 1-0 "Bastia", 10,269 (L)

-

18. 2 November 1985, "Bastia" 3-2 Brest, 2,000 (W)

Soler 20', Meyer 58', Cubaynes 62'

19. 9 November 1985, Nancy 4-1 "Bastia", 4,447 (L)

Testa 90'

20. 20 November 1985, "Bastia" 0-1 Lens, 1,000 (L)

-

21. 23 November 1985, Rennes 3-1 "Bastia", 6,350 (L)

Testa 62'

22. 30 November 1985, "Bastia" 2-3 Nantes, 3,200 (L)

Furlan 44', Pastinelli 72'

23. 7 December 1985, Toulon 1-1 "Bastia", 5,000 (D)

Testa 52'

24. 14 December 1985, "Bastia" 0-0 Sochaux, 2,090 (D)

-

25. 21 December 1985, AS Monaco 2-1 "Bastia", 3,028 (L)

Testa 52'

26. 11 January 1986, "Bastia" 0-0 Metz, 2,700 (D)

-

27. 18 January 1986, Strasbourg 6-1 "Bastia", 6,000 (L)

Testa 79'

28. 1 February 1986, Auxerre 2-0 "Bastia", 2,500 (L)

-

29. 8 February 1986, "Bastia" 0-2 Toulouse, 1,500, (L)

-

30. 11 March 1986, "Bastia" 0-2 Bordeaux, 1,000 (L)

-

31. 22 February 1986, Lille 2-2 "Bastia", 4,223 (D)

Testa 18', Furic 51'

32. 8 March 1986, Le Havre 5-2 "Bastia", 9,950 (L)

Testa 42', Ottaviani 87'

33. 15 March 1986, "Bastia" 0-3 Marseille, 1,000 (L)

-

34. 22 March 1986, Laval 1-0 "Bastia", 3,309 (L)

-

35. 4 April 1986, "Bastia" 0-1 Nice, 1,000 (L)

-

36. 11 April 1986, Brest 7-0 "Bastia", 4,000 (L)

-

37. 18 April 1986, "Bastia" 2-2 Nancy, 600 (D)

Biamonte 78', Nativi 84'

38. 25 April 1986, Paris SG 3-1 "Bastia", 40,000 (L)

Pilorget 52' (o.g.)

== Coupe de France ==
End of 64

- Rodez 0-0 (pen. 3-5) Bastia

End of 32

- 1. match: Bastia 4-1 Chaumont
- 2. match: Chaumont 3-0 Bastia

Bastia 5-5 Chaumont. Chaumont won 5-5 on away goals.
