= 1978 UEFA Cup final =

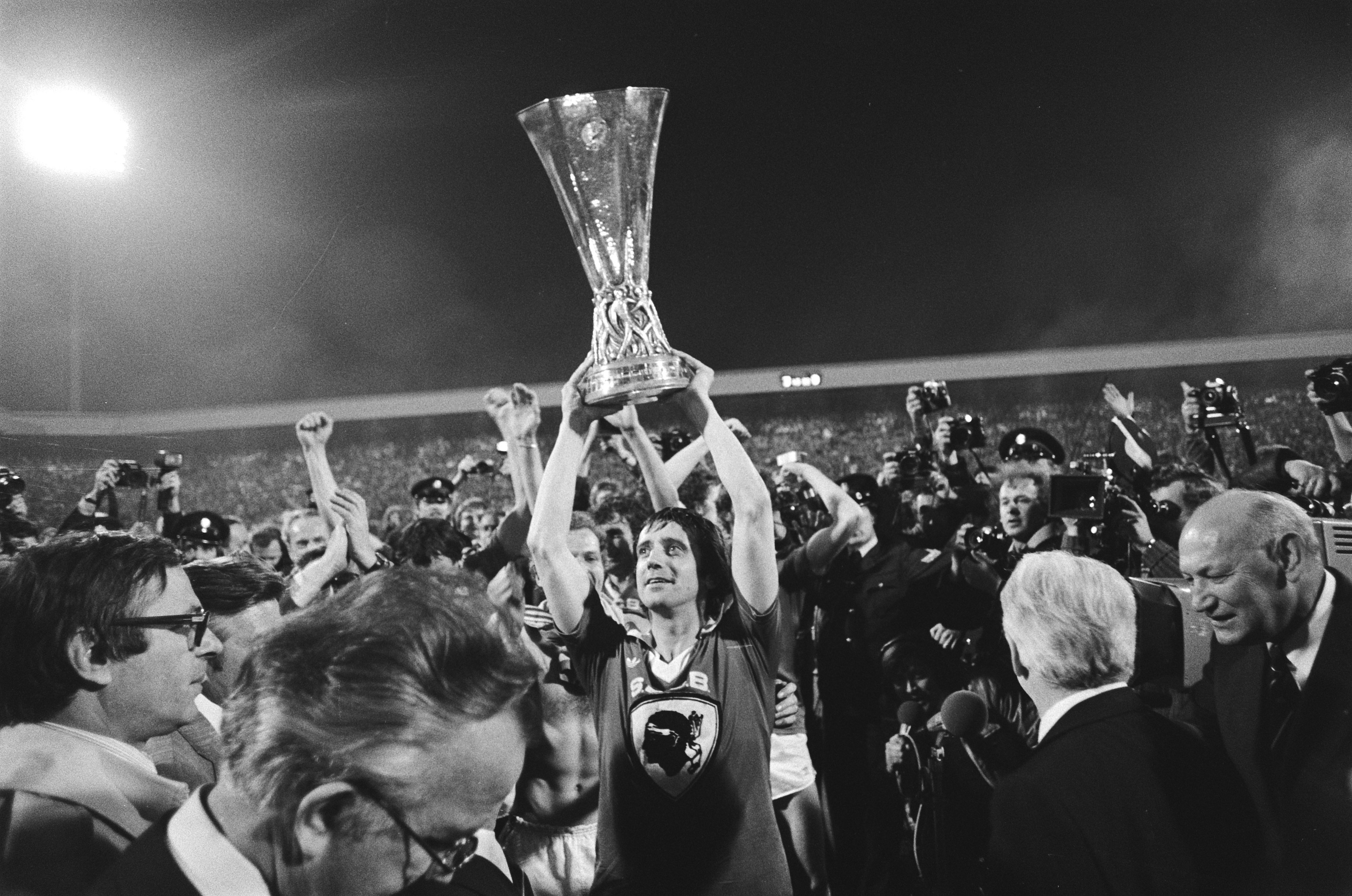
- PSV's Willy van der Kuijlen celebrating with the UEFA Cup after the final victory in Eindhoven, wearing the shirt of vanquished finalists Bastia.
- Event: 1977–78 UEFA Cup
Bastia	PSV
(France)	(Netherlands)
0	3
- on aggregate

First leg
Bastia	PSV
0	0
- Date: 26 April 1978
- Venue: Stade Furiani, Bastia
- Referee: Dušan Maksimović (Yugoslavia)
- Attendance: 15,000

Second leg
PSV	Bastia
3	0
- Date: 9 May 1978
- Venue: Philips Stadion, Eindhoven
- Referee: Nicolae Rainea (Romania)
- Attendance: 27,000

The 1978 UEFA Cup Final was a football match played on 26 April 1978 and 9 May 1978 between PSV Eindhoven of Netherlands and SEC Bastia of France. PSV won the tie 3–0 on aggregate, with a 3–0 victory at home following a goalless draw in Bastia.

== Route to the final ==
SEC Bastia				Round	PSV			
Opponent	Agg.	1st leg	2nd leg		Opponent	Agg.	1st leg	2nd leg
(Portugal) Sporting CP	5–3	3–2 (H)	2–1 (A)	First round	(Northern Ireland) Glenavon	11–2	6–2 (A)	5–0 (H)
(England) Newcastle United	5–2	2–1 (H)	3–1 (A)	Second round	(Poland) Widzew Łódź	6–3	5–3 (A)	1–0 (H)
(Italy) Torino	5–3	2–1 (H)	3–2 (A)	Third round	(West Germany) Eintracht Braunschweig	4–1	2–0 (H)	2–1 (A)
(East Germany) Carl Zeiss Jena	9–6	7–2 (H)	2–4 (A)	Quarter-finals	(East Germany) 1. FC Magdeburg	4–3	0–1 (A)	4–2 (H)
(Switzerland) Grasshoppers	3–3 (a)	2–3 (A)	1–0 (H)	Semi-finals	(Spain) Barcelona	4–3	3–0 (H)	1–3 (A)

== Match details ==
=== First leg ===
26 April 1978

Bastia (France)	0–0	(Netherlands) PSV
	(Report)

Stade Furiani, Bastia
Attendance: 15,000
Referee: Dušan Maksimović (Yugoslavia)

SEC Bastia	PSV

GK	1	(France) Pierrick Hiard
RB	2	(France) Jean-Louis Cazes
CB	5	(France) André Guesdon
CB	4	(France) Charles Orlanducci (c)
LB	3	(France) André Burkhard
CM	6	(France) Félix Lacuesta	(substituted off) 56'
CM	8	(France) Jean-François Larios
CM	10	(France) Claude Papi
RF	7	(Netherlands) Johnny Rep
CF	9	(Morocco) Abdelkrim Merry
LF	11	(France) Yves Mariot
Substitutes:
FW	12	(France) François Félix		(substituted on) 56'
Manager:
(France) Pierre Cahuzac

GK	1	(Netherlands) Jan van Beveren
RB	10	(Netherlands) Kees Krijgh
CB	9	(Netherlands) Adrie van Kraay
CB	4	(Netherlands) Ernie Brandts
LB	3	(Netherlands) Huub Stevens
CM	6	(Netherlands) Harry Lubse
CM	5	(Netherlands) Jan Poortvliet
CM	8	(Netherlands) Willy van de Kerkhof
RF	7	(Netherlands) René van de Kerkhof
CF	11	(Netherlands) Willy van der Kuijlen (c)
LF	2	(Netherlands) Gerrie Deijkers
Manager:
(Netherlands) Kees Rijvers

=== Second leg ===
9 May 1978

PSV (Netherlands)	3–0	(France) Bastia
W. van de Kerkhof 24'; Deijkers 67'; Van der Kuijlen 69'	(Report)

Philips Stadion, Eindhoven
Attendance: 27,000
Referee: Nicolae Rainea (Romania)

PSV	SEC Bastia

GK	1	(Netherlands) Jan van Beveren
RB	3	(Netherlands) Huub Stevens
CB	9	(Netherlands) Adrie van Kraay	(substituted off) 79'
CB	4	(Netherlands) Ernie Brandts
LB	10	(Netherlands) Kees Krijgh
CM	5	(Netherlands) Jan Poortvliet
CM	8	(Netherlands) Willy van de Kerkhof
RF	7	(Netherlands) René van de Kerkhof
CF	11	(Netherlands) Willy van der Kuijlen (c)
CF	6	(Netherlands) Harry Lubse
LF	2	(Netherlands) Gerrie Deijkers
Substitutes:
FW	12	(Wales) Nick Deacy		(substituted on) 79'
Manager:
(Netherlands) Kees Rijvers

GK	1	(France) Pierrick Hiard	(substituted off) 75'
RB	3	(France) Paul Marchioni
CB	5	(France) André Guesdon
CB	4	(France) Charles Orlanducci (c)
LB	2	(France) Jean-Louis Cazes
CM	6	(France) Félix Lacuesta
CM	8	(France) Jean-François Larios
CM	10	(France) Claude Papi
RF	7	(Netherlands) Johnny Rep
CF	9	(Morocco) Abdelkrim Merry
LF	11	(France) Yves Mariot	(substituted off) 67'
Substitutes:
GK	1	(France) Marc Weller	(substituted on) 75'
FW	12	(France) Jean-Marie De Zerbi	(substituted on) 67'
Manager:
(France) Pierre Cahuzac

== See also ==
- 1978 European Cup final
- 1978 European Cup Winners' Cup final
- Forza Bastia Documentary of game by Jacques Tati
- PSV Eindhoven in European football
- SC Bastia in European football
- 1977–78 SC Bastia season
