= PSV Eindhoven in international football =

Eindhoven football club

PSV in European football
- Club: PSV
- Seasons played: 57
- Top scorer: Willy van der Kuijlen (27)
- First entry: 1955–56 European Cup
- Latest entry: 2026–27 UEFA Champions League

Titles
- Champions League: 1: 1988
- Europa League: 1: 1978
- Cup Winners' Cup: 0
- Super Cup: 0

Philips Sport Vereniging is a Dutch football club based in Eindhoven. The club was founded in 1913.

This article is about the European matches of PSV. In Europe, PSV won the 1977–78 UEFA Cup and the 1987–88 European Cup. Their most recent European success was reaching the semi-finals in the 2004–05 Champions League, which PSV lost against Milan on away goals.

== History ==
=== Early years ===
Although not the oldest football club in the Netherlands, PSV has always been a successful club in club competition. Not only did they managed to win the Dutch title 26 times, but also they made fame in Europe. In 1955, PSV was the first Dutch club to participate in the European Cup, the first season in which the UEFA introduced a new club competition. This first season, however, was very unsuccessful for PSV, in which they lost the first leg against Rapid Wien 6–1, with Peter Fransen scoring the first European goal for the club. The same player scored in the return, where PSV won 1–0 against the Viennese club, but it was far not enough to progress to the second round.

In the 1963–64 season PSV participated in the European Cup for the second time, making it to the quarter-finals where they lost to FC Zürich. The biggest success gained PSV in the 1970–71 European Cup Winners' Cup. PSV made it to the semi-finals, but Real Madrid proved to be too strong. Revenge against the Spanish winners would come in 1972 and in 1988, the most successful year for PSV.

=== UEFA Cup success ===
PSV participated in the UEFA Cup for the first time in 1971 against East German side Hallescher FC. Again, it was also the first edition of a new European Cup, just like 16 years before. After a draw on homesoil, the East Germans withdrew from the competition after the first leg. The following match against Real Madrid was a repeat of the semi-finals of the 1970–71 European Cup Winners' Cup. PSV lost the first leg 1–3 in Madrid, but in the Netherlands, where the return was played in Den Bosch, PSV won 2–0 and managed to book a place in the third round by winning on the away goals rule. In the quarter-finals, however, Belgian club Lierse proved to be too strong, eliminating PSV.

The first golden era, also mentioned as the silver era, proved to be the 1970s. In the 1977–78 UEFA Cup, PSV won the trophy, the first European trophy for the club. In their first final, they played against French opponents Bastia. In a return on home soil, after a 0–0 draw in the first leg, PSV scored 3–0. The legendary squad with Jan van Beveren, Willy van der Kuijlen, and the brothers René and Willy van de Kerkhof is still remembered by PSV fans.

=== European Cup success ===
Ten years after the success of winning the UEFA Cup, PSV achieved another memorable performance. In the Eredivisie, PSV proved to be unbeaten, but in Europe, fans were hoping for success. In the 1987–88 European Cup, manager Guus Hiddink created a team that beat Galatasaray, Rapid Wien and Bordeaux on away goals. In the semi-final, PSV ended up again playing Real Madrid. The first leg in Madrid ended in 1–1 by a goal from Edward Linskens, while in the return, PSV held the Spanish side to a 0–0 draw, ensuring progression to the final on the away goals rule.

The final was played at the Neckarstadion, Stuttgart, against Portuguese side Benfica. After both sides failed to score in regular and extra time, the match went to penalties. The decisive play came from the PSV goalkeeper Hans van Breukelen who managed to stop the penalty from Benfica's António Veloso, allowing the club to claim the European Cup for the first time (and only so far).

=== Champions League ===
In 1992, the European Cup was rebranded as the UEFA Champions League. In the inaugural Champions League season of 1992–93, PSV was again the first Dutch club who played in the tournament. They reached the group stage, although this proved to be very unsuccessful with just one point earned from six matches.

From 1997–98 until 2008–09, PSV was one of the few clubs which participated in every group stage edition. Although the results were mixed, PSV reached the second round for the first time in the 2004–05. Before that, the club was unable to qualify for the knock-out phase, ending up in third or fourth place.

2004–05 proved to be the most successful Champions League season to date. PSV, with captain Mark van Bommel, Philip Cocu, Jan Vennegoor of Hesselink, Wilfred Bouma, Swiss midfielder Johann Vogel, Brazilians Heurelho Gomes and Alex, Jefferson Farfán and Koreans Park Ji-sung and Lee Young-pyo, progressed to the semi-finals after defeating Lyon on penalties. In the first leg against Milan, the Italians were deadly efficient and won 2–0. In the return leg in Eindhoven, PSV played one of its best ever matches, taking a 2–0 lead only for Massimo Ambrosini to score a fatal away goal for Milan. A late goal by Philip Cocu was not enough for one of the best teams of PSV in history as Milan progressed on away goals.

== Finals ==
=== UEFA ===
Year	Competition	Opposition	Home	Away	Aggregate
1978	UEFA Cup	(France) Bastia	3–0	0–0	3–0
1988	European Cup	(Portugal) Benfica	0–0 (a.e.t.) (6–5 p)		
1988	Super Cup	(Belgium) KV Mechelen	1–0	0–3	1–3

=== Intercontinental Cup ===
Year	Country	Club	Score
1988	Uruguay	Nacional	2–2 (a.e.t.) (6–7 p)

== European match history ==
As of 4 November 2026

Competition	Round	Opponent	Home	Away	Aggregate
1955–56 European Cup	First round	(Austria) Rapid Wien	1–0	1–6	2–6
1963–64 European Cup	Preliminary round	(Denmark) Esbjerg	7–1	4–3	11–4
1963–64 European Cup	First round	(Bulgaria) Spartak Plovdiv	0–0	1–0	1–0
1963–64 European Cup	Quarter-finals	(Switzerland) Zürich	1–0	1–3	2–3
1969–70 Cup Winners' Cup	First Round	(Austria) Rapid Wien	4–2	2–1	6–3
1969–70 Cup Winners' Cup	Second Round	(Italy) Roma	1–0	0–1	1–1 (c) (Note: PSV lost on a (coin toss))
1970–71 Cup Winners' Cup	First Round	(Czechoslovakia) TJ Gottwaldov	1–0	1–2	2–2 (a) (Note: Won on away goals.)
1970–71 Cup Winners' Cup	Second Round	(Romania) Steaua București	4–0	3–0	7–0
1970–71 Cup Winners' Cup	Quarter-finals	(East Germany) Vorwärts Berlin	2–0	0–1	2–1
1970–71 Cup Winners' Cup	Semi-finals	(Spain) Real Madrid	0–0	1–2	1–2
1971–72 UEFA Cup	First Round	(East Germany) Hallescher FC	– (Note: Chemie Halle withdrew ahead of the return leg due to the Eindhoven hotel fire that claimed the life of Halle's 21-year-old midfielder Wolfgang Hoffmann one day before the match. PSV were awarded a walkover.)	0–0	2–2 (w/o) (Note: Qulaified on (w/o))
1971–72 UEFA Cup	Second Round	(Spain) Real Madrid	2–0 (Note: The match was played in Den Bosch.)	1–3	3–3 (a)
1971–72 UEFA Cup	Third Round	(Belgium) Lierse	1–0	0–4	1–4
1974–75 Cup Winners' Cup	First Round	(Northern Ireland) Ards	10–0	4–1	14–1
1974–75 Cup Winners' Cup	Second Round	(Poland) Gwardia Warszawa	5–1	3–0	8–1
1974–75 Cup Winners' Cup	Quarter-finals	(Portugal) Benfica	0–0	2–1	2–1
1974–75 Cup Winners' Cup	Semi-finals	(Soviet Union) Dynamo Kyiv	2–1	0–3	2–4
1975–76 European Cup	First Round	(Northern Ireland) Linfield	8–0	2–1	10–1
1975–76 European Cup	Second Round	(Poland) Ruch Chorzów	4–0	3–1	7–1
1975–76 European Cup	Quarter-finals	(Socialist Federal Republic of Yugoslavia) Hajduk Split	3–0 (a.e.t.)	0–2	3–2 (Note: Won after extra time.)
1975–76 European Cup	Semi-finals	(France) Saint-Étienne	0–0	0–1	0–1
1976–77 European Cup	First Round	(Republic of Ireland) Dundalk	6–0	1–1	7–1
1976–77 European Cup	Second Round	(France) Saint-Étienne	0–0	0–1	0–1
1977–78 UEFA Cup	First Round	(Northern Ireland) Glenavon	5–0	6–2	11–2
1977–78 UEFA Cup	Second Round	(Poland) Widzew Łódź	1–0	6–2	6–3
1977–78 UEFA Cup	Third Round	(West Germany) Eintracht Braunschweig	2–0	2–1	4–1
1977–78 UEFA Cup	Quarter-finals	(East Germany) 1. FC Magdeburg	2–0	0–1	4–3
1977–78 UEFA Cup	Semi-finals	(Spain) Barcelona	3–0	1–3	4–3
1977–78 UEFA Cup	Final	(France) Bastia	3–0	0–0	3–0
1978–79 European Cup	First Round	(Turkey) Fenerbahçe	6–1	1–2	7–3
1978–79 European Cup	Second Round	(Scotland) Rangers	2–3	0–0	2–3
1979–80 UEFA Cup	First Round	(Spain) Sporting Gijón	1–0	0–0	1–0
1979–80 UEFA Cup	Second Round	(France) Saint-Étienne	2–0	0–6	2–6
1980–81 UEFA Cup	First Round	(England) Wolverhampton Wanderers	3–1	0–1	3–2
1980–81 UEFA Cup	Second Round	(Germany) Hamburger SV	1–1	1–2	2–3
1981–82 UEFA Cup	First Round	(Denmark) Næstved	7–0	1–2	8–2
1981–82 UEFA Cup	Second Round	(Austria) Rapid Wien	2–1	0–1	2–2 (a) (Note: Lost on away goals.)
1982–83 UEFA Cup	First Round	(Scotland) Dundee United	0–2	1–1	1–3
1983–84 UEFA Cup	First Round	(Hungary) Ferencváros	4–2	2–0	6–2
1983–84 UEFA Cup	Second Round	(England) Nottingham Forest	1–2	0–1	1–3
1984–85 UEFA Cup	First Round	(East Germany) Vorwärts Frankfurt	3–0	0–2	3–2
1984–85 UEFA Cup	Second Round	(England) Manchester United	0–0	0–1 (a.e.t.)	0–1 (Note: Lost after extra time.)
1985–86 UEFA Cup	First Round	(Luxembourg) Avenir Beggen	4–0	2–0	6–0
1985–86 UEFA Cup	Second Round	(Soviet Union) Dnipro Dnipropetrovsk	2–2	0–1	2–3
1986–87 European Cup	First Round	(Germany) Bayern Munich	0–2	0–0	0–2
1987–88 European Cup	First Round	(Turkey) Galatasaray	3–0	0–2	3–2
1987–88 European Cup	Second Round	(Austria) Rapid Wien	2–0	2–1	4–1
1987–88 European Cup	Quarter-finals	(France) Bordeaux	0–0	1–1	1–1 (a)
1987–88 European Cup	Semi-finals	(Spain) Real Madrid	0–0	1–1	1–1 (a)
1987–88 European Cup	Final	(Portugal) Benfica	0–0 (a.e.t.) (6–5 p)		
1988 Super Cup	Final	(Belgium) KV Mechelen	1–0	0–3	1–3
1988–89 European Cup	Second Round	(Portugal) Porto	5–0	0–2	5–2
1988–89 European Cup	Quarter-finals	(Spain) Real Madrid	1–1	1–2 (a.e.t.)	2–3
1989–90 European Cup	First Round	(Switzerland) Luzern	3–0	2–0	5–0
1989–90 European Cup	Second Round	(Romania) Steaua București	5–1	0–1	5–2
1989–90 European Cup	Quarter-finals	(Germany) Bayern Munich	0–1	1–2	1–3
1990–91 Cup Winners' Cup	First Round	(France) Montpellier	0–0	1–2	0–1
1991–92 European Cup	First Round	(Turkey) Beşiktaş	2–1	1–1	3–2
1991–92 European Cup	Second Round	(Belgium) Anderlecht	0–0	0–2	0–2
1992–93 Champions League	First Round	(Lithuania) Žalgiris	6–0	2–0	8–0
1992–93 Champions League	Second Round	(Greece) AEK Athens	3–0	0–1	3–1
1992–93 Champions League	Group B	(Portugal) Porto	0–1	2–2	4th
1992–93 Champions League	Group B	(Italy) Milan	1–2	0–2	4th
1992–93 Champions League	Group B	(Sweden) IFK Göteborg	1–3	0–3	4th
1993–94 UEFA Cup	First Round	(Germany) Karlsruher SC	0–0	1–2	1–2
1994–95 UEFA Cup	First Round	(Germany) Bayer Leverkusen	0–0	4–5	4–5
1995–96 UEFA Cup	First Round	(Finland) MyPa	7–1	1–1	8–2
1995–96 UEFA Cup	Second Round	(England) Leeds United	3–0	5–3	8–3
1995–96 UEFA Cup	Third Round	(Germany) Werder Bremen	2–1	0–0	2–1
1995–96 UEFA Cup	Quarter-finals	(Spain) Barcelona	2–3	2–2	4–5
1996–97 Cup Winners' Cup	First Round	(Georgia (country)) Dinamo Batumi	3–0	1–1	4–1
1996–97 Cup Winners' Cup	Second Round	(Norway) Brann	2–2	1–2	3–4
1997–98 Champions League	Group C	(Ukraine) Dynamo Kyiv	1–3	1–1	2nd
1997–98 Champions League	Group C	(Spain) Barcelona	2–2	2–2	2nd
1997–98 Champions League	Group C	(England) Newcastle United	1–0	2–0	2nd
1998–99 Champions League	Third qualifying round	(Slovenia) Maribor Branik	4–1 (a.e.t.)	1–2	5–3
1998–99 Champions League	Group F	(Finland) HJK	2–1	3–1	3rd
1998–99 Champions League	Group F	(Portugal) Benfica	2–2	1–2	3rd
1998–99 Champions League	Group F	(Germany) 1. FC Kaiserslautern	1–2	1–3	3rd
1999–2000 Champions League	Third qualifying round	(Moldova) Zimbru Chișinău	2–0	0–0	2–0
1999–2000 Champions League	Group F	(Germany) Bayern Munich	2–1	1–2	4th
1999–2000 Champions League	Group F	(Spain) Valencia	1–1	0–1	4th
1999–2000 Champions League	Group F	(Scotland) Rangers	0–1	1–4	4th
2000–01 Champions League	Group G	(Ukraine) Dynamo Kyiv	2–1	1–0	3rd
2000–01 Champions League	Group G	(Belgium) Anderlecht	2–3	1–0	3rd
2000–01 Champions League	Group G	(England) Manchester United	3–1	1–3	3rd
2000–01 UEFA Cup	Third Round	(Greece) PAOK	3–0	1–0	4–0
2000–01 UEFA Cup	Fourth Round	(Italy) Parma	2–1	2–3	4–4 (a)
2000–01 UEFA Cup	Quarter-finals	(Germany) 1. FC Kaiserslautern	0–1	0–1	0–2
2001–02 Champions League	Group D	(France) Nantes	0–0	1–4	3rd
2001–02 Champions League	Group D	(Turkey) Galatasaray	3–1	0–2	3rd
2001–02 Champions League	Group D	(Italy) Lazio	1–0	1–2	3rd
2001–02 UEFA Cup	Third Round	(Greece) PAOK	4–1	2–3	6–4
2001–02 UEFA Cup	Fourth round	(England) Leeds United	0–0	1–0	1–0
2001–02 UEFA Cup	Quarter-finals	(Netherlands) Feyenoord	1–1	1–1 (a.e.t.)	2–2 (4–5 p) (Note: Lost on penalties.)
2002–03 Champions League	Group A	(France) Auxerre	3–0	0–0	4th
2002–03 Champions League	Group A	(England) Arsenal	0–4	0–0	4th
2002–03 Champions League	Group A	(Germany) Borussia Dortmund	1–3	1–1	4th
2003–04 Champions League	Group C	(France) Monaco	1–2	1–1	3rd
2003–04 Champions League	Group C	(Spain) Deportivo La Coruña	3–2	0–2	3rd
2003–04 Champions League	Group C	(Greece) AEK Athens	2–0	1–0	3rd
2003–04 UEFA Cup	Third Round	(Italy) Perugia	3–1	0–0	3–1
2003–04 UEFA Cup	Fourth round	(France) Auxerre	3–0	1–1	4–1
2003–04 UEFA Cup	Quarter-finals	(England) Newcastle United	1–1	1–2	2–3
2004–05 Champions League	Third qualifying round	(Serbia) Red Star Belgrade	5–0	2–3	7–3
2004–05 Champions League	Group E	(England) Arsenal	1–1	0–1	2nd
2004–05 Champions League	Group E	(Greece) Panathinaikos	1–0	1–4	2nd
2004–05 Champions League	Group E	(Norway) Rosenborg	1–0	2–1	2nd
2004–05 Champions League	Round of 16	(France) Monaco	1–0	2–0	3–0
2004–05 Champions League	Quarter-finals	(France) Lyon	1–1	1–1 (a.e.t.)	2–2 (4–2 p) (Note: Won on penalties.)
2004–05 Champions League	Semi-finals	(Italy) Milan	3–1	0–2	3–3 (a)
2005–06 Champions League	Group E	(Germany) Schalke 04	1–0	0–3	2nd
2005–06 Champions League	Group E	(Turkey) Fenerbahçe	2–0	0–3	2nd
2005–06 Champions League	Group E	(Italy) Milan	1–0	0–0	2nd
2005–06 Champions League	Round of 16	(France) Lyon	0–1	0–4	0–5
2006–07 Champions League	Group C	(England) Liverpool	0–0	0–2	2nd
2006–07 Champions League	Group C	(France) Bordeaux	1–3	1–0	2nd
2006–07 Champions League	Group C	(Turkey) Galatasaray	2–0	2–1	2nd
2006–07 Champions League	Round of 16	(England) Arsenal	1–0	1–1	2–1
2006–07 Champions League	Quarter-finals	(England) Liverpool	0–3	0–1	0–4
2007–08 Champions League	Group G	(Russia) CSKA Moscow	2–1	1–0	3rd
2007–08 Champions League	Group G	(Italy) Internazionale	0–1	0–2	3rd
2007–08 Champions League	Group G	(Turkey) Fenerbahçe	0–0	0–2	3rd
2007–08 UEFA Cup	Round of 32	(Sweden) Helsingborgs IF	2–0	2–1	4–1
2007–08 UEFA Cup	Round of 16	(England) Tottenham Hotspur	0–1 (a.e.t.)	1–0	2–2 (6–5 p)
2007–08 UEFA Cup	Quarter-finals	(Italy) Fiorentina	0–2	1–1	1–3
2008–09 Champions League	Group D	(Spain) Atlético Madrid	0–3	1–2	4th
2008–09 Champions League	Group D	(England) Liverpool	1–3	1–3	4th
2008–09 Champions League	Group D	(France) Marseille	2–0	0–3	4th
2009–10 Europa League	Third qualifying round	(Bulgaria) Cherno More	1–0	1–0	2–0
2009–10 Europa League	Play-off round	(Israel) Bnei Yehuda	1–0	1–0	2–0
2009–10 Europa League	Group K	(Czech Republic) Sparta Prague	1–0	2–2	1st
2009–10 Europa League	Group K	(Romania) CFR Cluj	1–0	2–0	1st
2009–10 Europa League	Group K	(Denmark) Copenhagen	1–0	1–1	1st
2009–10 Europa League	Round of 32	(Germany) Hamburger SV	3–2	0–1	3–3 (a)
2010–11 Europa League	Play-off round	(Russia) Sibir Novosibirsk	5–0	0–1	5–1
2010–11 Europa League	Group I	(Italy) Sampdoria	1–1	2–1	1st
2010–11 Europa League	Group I	(Ukraine) Metalist Kharkiv	0–0	2–0	1st
2010–11 Europa League	Group I	(Hungary) Debrecen	3–0	2–1	1st
2010–11 Europa League	Round of 32	(France) Lille	3–1	2–2	5–3
2010–11 Europa League	Round of 16	(Scotland) Rangers	0–0	1–0	1–0
2010–11 Europa League	Quarter-finals	(Portugal) Benfica	2–2	1–4	3–6
2011–12 Europa League	Play-off round	(Austria) SV Ried	5–0	0–0	5–0
2011–12 Europa League	Group C	(Poland) Legia Warsaw	1–0	3–0	1st
2011–12 Europa League	Group C	(Romania) Rapid București	2–1	3–1	1st
2011–12 Europa League	Group C	(Israel) Hapoel Tel Aviv	3–3	1–0	1st
2011–12 Europa League	Round of 32	(Turkey) Trabzonspor	4–1	2–1	6–2
2011–12 Europa League	Round of 16	(Spain) Valencia	1–1	2–4	3–5
2012–13 Europa League	Play-off round	(Montenegro) Zeta	9–0	5–0	14–0
2012–13 Europa League	Group C	(Ukraine) Dnipro Dnipropetrovsk	1–2	0–2	3rd
2012–13 Europa League	Group C	(Italy) Napoli	3–0	3–1	3rd
2012–13 Europa League	Group C	(Sweden) AIK	1–1	0–1	3rd
2013–14 Champions League	Third qualifying round	(Belgium) Zulte Waregem	2–0	3–0	5–0
2013–14 Champions League	Play-off round	(Italy) Milan	1–1	0–3	1–4
2013–14 Europa League	Group B	(Bulgaria) Ludogorets Razgrad	0–2	0–2	3rd
2013–14 Europa League	Group B	(Ukraine) Chornomorets Odesa	0–1	2–0	3rd
2013–14 Europa League	Group B	(Croatia) Dinamo Zagreb	2–0	0–0	3rd
2014–15 Europa League	Third qualifying round	(Austria) SKN St. Pölten	1–0	3–2	4–2
2014–15 Europa League	Play-off round	(Belarus) Shakhtyor Soligorsk	1–0	2–0	3–0
2014–15 Europa League	Group E	(Portugal) Estoril	1–0	3–3	2nd
2014–15 Europa League	Group E	(Russia) Dynamo Moscow	0–1	0–1	2nd
2014–15 Europa League	Group E	(Greece) Panathinaikos	1–1	3–2	2nd
2014–15 Europa League	Round of 32	(Russia) Zenit Saint Petersburg	0–1	0–3	0–4
2015–16 Champions League	Group B	(England) Manchester United	2–1	0–0	2nd
2015–16 Champions League	Group B	(Russia) CSKA Moscow	2–1	2–3	2nd
2015–16 Champions League	Group B	(Germany) VfL Wolfsburg	2–0	0–2	2nd
2015–16 Champions League	Round of 16	(Spain) Atlético Madrid	0–0	0–0 (a.e.t.)	0–0 (7–8 p)
2016–17 Champions League	Group D	(Spain) Atlético Madrid	0–1	0–2	4th
2016–17 Champions League	Group D	(Russia) Rostov	0–0	2–2	4th
2016–17 Champions League	Group D	(Germany) Bayern Munich	1–2	1–4	4th
2017–18 Europa League	Third qualifying round	(Croatia) Osijek	0–1	0–1	0–2
2018–19 Champions League	Play-off round	(Belarus) BATE Borisov	3–0	3–2	6–2
2018–19 Champions League	Group B	(Spain) Barcelona	1–2	0–4	4th
2018–19 Champions League	Group B	(Italy) Internazionale	1–2	1–1	4th
2018–19 Champions League	Group B	(England) Tottenham Hotspur	2–2	1–2	4th
2019–20 Champions League	Second qualifying round	(Switzerland) Basel	3–2	1–2	4–4 (a)
2019–20 Europa League	Third qualifying round	(Norway) Haugesund	0–0	1–0	1–0
2019–20 Europa League	Play-off round	(Cyprus) Apollon Limassol	3–0	4–0	7–0
2019–20 Europa League	Group D	(Portugal) Sporting CP	3–2	0–4	3rd
2019–20 Europa League	Group D	(Norway) Rosenborg	1–1	4–1	3rd
2019–20 Europa League	Group D	(Austria) LASK	0–0	0–1	3rd
2020–21 Europa League	Third qualifying round	(Slovenia) Mura	—N/a	5–1	—N/a
2020–21 Europa League	Play-off round	(Norway) Rosenborg	—N/a	2–0	—N/a
2020–21 Europa League	Group E	(Spain) Granada	1–2	1–0	1st
2020–21 Europa League	Group E	(Greece) PAOK	3–2	1–4	1st
2020–21 Europa League	Group E	(Cyprus) Omonia	4–0	2–1	1st
2020–21 Europa League	Round of 32	(Greece) Olympiacos	2–1	2–4	4–5
2021–22 Champions League	Second qualifying round	(Turkey) Galatasaray	5–1	2–1	7–2
2021–22 Champions League	Third qualifying round	(Denmark) Midtjylland	3–0	1–0	4–0
2021–22 Champions League	Play-off round	(Portugal) Benfica	0–0	1–2	1–2
2021–22 Europa League	Group B	(Spain) Real Sociedad	2–2	0–3	3rd
2021–22 Europa League	Group B	(Austria) Sturm Graz	2–0	4–1	3rd
2021–22 Europa League	Group B	(France) Monaco	1–2	0–0	3rd
2021–22 Europa Conference League	Knockout round play-offs	(Israel) Maccabi Tel Aviv	1–0	1–1	2–1
2021–22 Europa Conference League	Round of 16	(Denmark) Copenhagen	4–4	4–0	8–4
2021–22 Europa Conference League	Quarter-finals	(England) Leicester City	1–2	0–0	1–2
2022–23 Champions League	Third qualifying round	(France) Monaco	3–2 (a.e.t.)	1–1	4–3
2022–23 Champions League	Play-off round	(Scotland) Rangers	0–1	2–2	2–3
2022–23 Europa League	Group A	(Norway) Bodø/Glimt	1–1	2–1	2nd
2022–23 Europa League	Group A	(Switzerland) Zürich	5–0	5–1	2nd
2022–23 Europa League	Group A	(England) Arsenal	2–0	0–1	2nd
2022–23 Europa League	Knockout round play-offs	(Spain) Sevilla	2–0	0–3	2–3
2023–24 Champions League	Third qualifying round	(Austria) Sturm Graz	4–1	3–1	7–2
2023–24 Champions League	Play-off round	(Scotland) Rangers	5–1	2–2	7–3
2023–24 Champions League	Group B	(England) Arsenal	1–1	0–4	2nd
2023–24 Champions League	Group B	(Spain) Sevilla	2–2	3–2	2nd
2023–24 Champions League	Group B	(France) Lens	1–0	1–1	2nd
2023–24 Champions League	Round of 16	(Germany) Borussia Dortmund	1–1	0–2	1–3
2024–25 Champions League	League phase	(Italy) Juventus	—N/a	1–3	14th
2024–25 Champions League	League phase	(Portugal) Sporting CP	1–1	—N/a	14th
2024–25 Champions League	League phase	(France) Paris Saint-Germain	—N/a	1–1	14th
2024–25 Champions League	League phase	(Spain) Girona	4–0	—N/a	14th
2024–25 Champions League	League phase	(Ukraine) Shakhtar Donetsk	3–2	—N/a	14th
2024–25 Champions League	League phase	(France) Brest	—N/a	0–1	14th
2024–25 Champions League	League phase	(Serbia) Red Star Belgrade	—N/a	3–2	14th
2024–25 Champions League	League phase	(England) Liverpool	3–2	—N/a	14th
2024–25 Champions League	Knockout phase play-offs	(Italy) Juventus	3–1 (a.e.t.)	1–2	4–3
2024–25 Champions League	Round of 16	(England) Arsenal	1–7	2–2	3–9
2025–26 Champions League	League phase	(Belgium) Union Saint-Gilloise	1–3	—N/a	28th
2025–26 Champions League	League phase	(Germany) Bayer Leverkusen	—N/a	1–1	28th
2025–26 Champions League	League phase	(Italy) Napoli	6–2	—N/a	28th
2025–26 Champions League	League phase	(Greece) Olympiacos	—N/a	1–1	28th
2025–26 Champions League	League phase	(England) Liverpool	—N/a	4–1	28th
2025–26 Champions League	League phase	(Spain) Atlético Madrid	2–3	—N/a	28th
2025–26 Champions League	League phase	(England) Newcastle United	—N/a	0–3	28th
2025–26 Champions League	League phase	(Germany) Bayern Munich	1–2	—N/a	28th
2026–27 Champions League	League phase	(Ukraine) Shakhtar Donetsk	1–1	—N/a	
2026–27 Champions League	League phase	(Germany) RB Leipzig	—N/a	0–1	
2026–27 Champions League	League phase	(Portugal) Porto	—N/a	1–0	
2026–27 Champions League	League phase	(Belgium) Club Brugge	1–2	—N/a	
2026–27 Champions League	League phase	(Spain) Real Madrid	—N/a		
2026–27 Champions League	League phase	(Spain) Atlético Madrid		—N/a	
2026–27 Champions League	League phase	(Norway) Viking	—N/a		
2026–27 Champions League	League phase	(Germany) VfB Stuttgart		—N/a	

== Statistics ==
=== Overall record ===
As of 4 November 2026

Competition	Pld	W	D	L	GF	GA	GD	Win%
European Cup / UEFA Champions League	223	82	55	86	314	296	+18	36.77
UEFA Cup Winners' Cup	26	14	5	7	52	22	+30	53.85
UEFA Cup / UEFA Europa League	179	90	39	50	305	189	+116	50.28
UEFA Europa Conference League	6	2	3	1	11	7	+4	33.33
UEFA Super Cup	2	1	0	1	1	3	−2	50.00
Total	437	189	102	146	683	517	+166	43.25

=== UEFA club ranking ===
As of 12 May 2025

Rank	Team	Points
25	(Scotland) Rangers	71.250
26	(Netherlands) Feyenoord	71.000
27	(Netherlands) PSV Eindhoven	69.250
28	(England) West Ham United	69.000
29	(England) Tottenham Hotspur	68.250

=== Top goalscorers ===
As of 21 January 2025

Rank	Goals	Player	Last goal	Tournament
1	27	(Netherlands) Willy van der Kuijlen	5 November 1980	UEFA Cup
2	22	(Netherlands) Luuk de Jong	21 January 2025	Champions League
3	16	(Netherlands) Harry Lubse	1 November 1978	European Cup
4	15	(Brazil) Romário	9 December 1992	Champions League
5	14	(Netherlands) Cody Gakpo	6 October 2022	Europa League
5	14	(Slovenia) Tim Matavž	20 August 2013	Champions League
5	14	(Israel) Eran Zahavi	14 April 2022	Europa Conference League
8	13	(Serbia) Mateja Kežman	14 April 2004	UEFA Cup
9	12	(Netherlands) Gerrie Deijkers	1 November 1978	European Cup
9	12	(Netherlands) Donyell Malen	10 December 2020	Europa League
11	11	(Belgium) Luc Nilis	26 October 1999	Champions League
11	11	(Sweden) Ola Toivonen	7 November 2013	Europa League
13	10	(Netherlands) Georginio Wijnaldum	22 November 2012	Europa League
14	9	(Netherlands) Arnold Bruggink	30 October 2002	Champions League
14	9	(Netherlands) Willy van de Kerkhof	15 September 1982	UEFA Cup
14	9	(Netherlands) Ruud van Nistelrooy	26 October 1999	Champions League
14	9	(Brazil) Ronaldo	21 November 1995	UEFA Cup
14	9	(Morocco) Ismael Saibari	28 January 2026	Champions League
14	9	(Norway) Hallvar Thoresen	23 October 1985	UEFA Cup
20	8	(Netherlands) Phillip Cocu	1 October 1997	Champions League
20	8	(Netherlands) Memphis Depay	27 November 2014	Europa League
20	8	(Netherlands) Juul Ellerman	16 September 1992	Champions League

=== Opponents by country ===
As of 4 November 2026

Nation	Pld	W	D	L	GF	GA	Opponents
Austria	18	13	2	3	37	21	LASK (2), Rapid Wien (8), Ried (2), St. Pölten (2), Sturm Graz (4)
Belgium	12	4	1	7	11	17	Anderlecht (4), Club Brugge KV (1), Lierse (2), Mechelen (2), Union Saint-Gilloise (1), Zulte Waregem (2)
Belarus	4	4	0	0	9	2	BATE Borisov (2), Shakhtyor Soligorsk (2)
Bulgaria	6	3	1	2	3	4	Cherno More (2), Ludogorets Razgrad (2), Spartak Plovdiv (2)
Croatia (Note: Includes the teams of former Yugoslavia.)	6	2	1	3	5	4	Dinamo Zagreb (2), Hajduk Split (2), Osijek (2)
Cyprus	4	4	0	0	13	1	Apollon Limassol (2), Omonia (2)
Czech Republic (Note: Includes the teams of former Includes the teams of Czechoslovakia.)	4	2	1	1	5	4	TJ Gottwaldov (2), Sparta Prague (2)
Denmark	10	7	2	1	33	11	Copenhagen (4), Esbjerg (2), Midtjylland (2), Næstved BK (2)
England	45	13	12	20	47	64	Arsenal (12), Leicester City (2), Leeds United (4), Liverpool (8), Manchester United (6), Newcastle United (5), Nottingham Forest (2), Tottenham Hotspur (4), Wolverhampton Wanderers (2)
Finland	4	3	1	0	13	4	HJK (2), MyPa (2)
France	40	11	17	12	38	42	Auxerre (4), Bastia (2), Bordeaux (4), Lens (2) Lille (2), Lyon (4), Nantes (2), Marseille (2), Monaco (8), Montpellier (2), Paris Saint-Germain (1), Saint-Étienne (6), Stade Brestois 29 (1)
Georgia	2	1	1	0	4	1	Dinamo Batumi (2)
Germany (Note: Includes the teams of former East Germany.)	42	10	9	23	41	58	Bayer Leverkusen (3), Bayern Munich (9), Borussia Dortmund (4), Eintracht Braunschweig (2), Chemie Halle (1), Hamburger SV (4), 1. FC Kaiserslautern (4), Karlsruhe (2), 1. FC Magdeburg (2), RB Leipzig (1), Schalke 04 (2), Vorwärts Berlin (4), Werder Bremen (2), VfL Wolfsburg (2)
Greece	17	10	2	5	31	24	AEK Athens (4), Olympiacos (3), Panathinaikos (4), PAOK (6)
Hungary	4	4	0	0	11	3	Debrecen (2), Ferencváros (2)
Ireland	4	3	1	0	18	3	Dundalk (2), Glenavon (2)
Israel	6	4	2	0	8	4	Bnei Yehuda (2), Hapoel Tel Aviv (2), Maccabi Tel Aviv (2)
Italy	30	11	6	13	39	39	Fiorentina (2), Inter Milan (4), Juventus (3), Lazio (2), Milan (8), Napoli (3), Parma (2), Perugia (2), Roma (2), Sampdoria (2)
Lithuania	2	2	0	0	8	0	Žalgiris Vilnius (2)
Luxembourg	2	2	0	0	6	0	Avenir Beggen (2)
Moldova	2	1	1	0	2	0	Zimbru Chișinău (2)
Montenegro	2	2	0	0	14	0	Zeta (2)
Netherlands	2	0	2	0	2	2	Feyenoord (2)
Northern Ireland	4	4	0	0	24	2	Ards (2), Linfield (2)
Norway	11	6	4	1	17	9	Bodø/Glimt (2), Brann (2), Haugesund (2), Rosenborg (5)
Poland	8	8	0	0	25	5	Gwardia Warsaw (2), Legia Warsaw (2), Ruch Chorzów (2), Widzew Łódź (2)
Portugal	19	5	8	6	25	28	Benfica (9), Estoril (2), Porto (5), Sporting CP (3)
Romania	8	7	0	1	20	4	CFR Cluj (2), Rapid București (2), Steaua București (4)
Russia	12	4	2	6	14	14	CSKA Moscow (4), Dynamo Moscow (2), Rostov (2), Sibir Novosibirsk (2), Zenit Saint Petersburg (2)
Scotland	12	2	5	5	14	17	Dundee United (2), Rangers (10)
Slovenia	3	2	0	1	10	4	Mura (1), Maribor (2)
Serbia	3	2	0	1	10	5	Red Star Belgrade (3)
Spain	40	8	14	18	46	63	Atlético Madrid (7), Barcelona (8), Deportivo La Coruña (2), Girona (1), Granada (2), Real Madrid (8), Real Sociedad (2), Sevilla (4), Sporting Gijón (2), Valencia (4)
Sweden	6	2	1	3	6	9	AIK (2), IFK Göteborg (2), Helsingborg (2)
Switzerland	8	6	0	2	21	8	Basel (2), Luzern (2), Zürich (4)
Turkey	18	11	2	5	35	20	Beşiktaş (2), Fenerbahçe (6), Galatasaray (8), Trabzonspor (2)
Ukraine (Note: Includes the teams of former Soviet Union.)	16	6	4	6	18	20	Chornomorets Odesa (2), Dnipro Dnipropetrovsk (4), Dynamo Kyiv (6), Metalist Kharkiv (2), Shakhtar Donetsk (2)

=== Most frequent opponents ===
As of 28 January 2026

Rank	Club	Pld	W	D	L	GF	GA
1	(England) Arsenal	12	2	5	5	9	22
2	(Scotland) Rangers	10	2	4	4	13	14
3	(Germany) Bayern Munich	9	1	1	7	7	16
3	(Portugal) Benfica	9	1	5	3	9	13
5	(Spain) Barcelona	8	1	3	4	13	18
5	(Turkey) Galatasaray	8	6	0	2	17	8
5	(England) Liverpool	8	2	1	5	9	15
5	(Italy) Milan	8	2	2	4	6	11
5	(France) Monaco	8	3	3	2	10	8
5	(Austria) Rapid Wien	8	6	0	2	14	12
11	(Spain) Atlético Madrid	7	0	2	5	3	11
12	(Turkey) Fenerbahçe	6	2	1	3	9	8
12	(England) Manchester United	6	2	2	2	6	6
12	(Greece) PAOK	6	4	0	2	14	10
12	(France) Saint-Étienne	6	1	2	3	2	8
