= De Zerbi =

De Zerbi is a surname. Notable people with the surname include:

- Jean-Marie De Zerbi (born 1959), French former footballer (mostly played for Brescia), now an assistant manager
- Roberto De Zerbi (born 1979), Italian former footballer (various Italian clubs), later manager for various clubs
