= Quinten Huybers =

Dutch footballer

Personal information
- Full name: Quinten Huybers
- Date of birth: 6 December 2001 (age 24)
- Place of birth: Netherlands
- Position: Defender

Team information
- Current team: PSV/av
- Number: 5

Youth career
- –2019: Unitas '59

Senior career*
Years	Team	Apps	(Gls)
2019–2021	Eindhoven	4	(0)
2022–2023	Unitas '59		
2023–	PSV/av		
- * Club domestic league appearances and goals as of 13:17, 2 June 2020 (UTC)

Quinten Huybers (born 6 December 2001) is a Dutch footballer who currently plays as a defender for PSV AV, the amateur branch of Dutch giants PSV Eindhoven.

== Career ==
Ahead of the 2022–23 season, Huybers returned to his former childhood club, SV Unitas '59. In the 2023–24 season, Huybers was playing for PSV Eindhoven's amateur team.

== Personal life ==
Huybers is a grandson of former PSV legend Willy van de Kerkhof.

== Career statistics ==
=== Club ===
As of 2 June 2020.

Club	Season	League			Cup		Continental		Other		Total	
Club	Season	Division	Apps	Goals	Apps	Goals	Apps	Goals	Apps	Goals	Apps	Goals
Eindhoven	2019–20	Eerste Divisie	3	0	1 (Note: Appearances in the KNVB Cup)	0	–		0	0	4	0
Career total			3	0	1	0	0	0	0	0	4	0
