= Gerrie Deijkers =

Dutch footballer

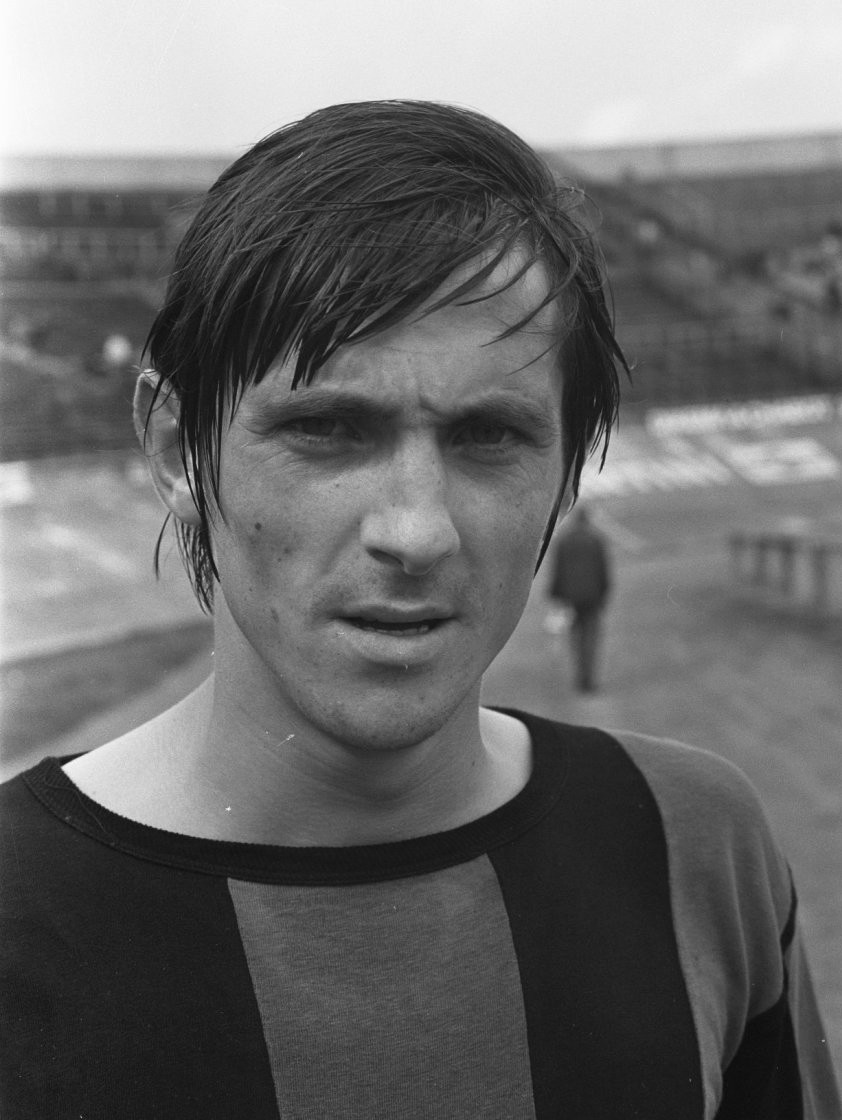
- Deijkers in 1970

Personal information
- Full name: Gerrie Deijkers
- Date of birth: 13 November 1946
- Place of birth: Breda, Netherlands
- Date of death: 29 October 2003 (aged 56)
- Place of death: Breda, Netherlands
- Positions: Left-back; forward

Senior career*
Years	Team	Apps	(Gls)
1965–1968	Baronie	83	(40)
1968–1969	NAC	28	(8)
1969–1970	Willem II	32	(24)
1970–1972	DWS	56	(10)
1972–1973	De Graafschap	27	(5)
1973–1979	PSV	170	(35)
1979	Beringen	8	(2)
1980–1981	Vitesse	20	(12)
Total		424	(136)
- * Club domestic league appearances and goals

Gerrie Deijkers (13 November 1946 – 29 October 2003) was a Dutch professional football player.

== Career ==
Deijkers played at the beginning of his career at VV Baronie, NAC Breda, Willem II, AFC DWS and De Graafschap. He became the top scorer for Willem II in the Eerste Divisie in 1969–70 with 24 goals. He was part of the De Graafschap team that won promotion to the Eredivisie for the first time in their history in 1973.

In 1973, trainer Kees Rijvers took Deijkers to PSV to join René van de Kerkhof, Willy van de Kerkhof and Ralf Edström. In the 1977–78 season, Deijkers became the club's top scorer with 18 goals to help PSV to win the league. Moreover, that was a successful year for Deijkers as he scored 8 times in the UEFA Cup tournament; the 1977–78 UEFA Cup won by PSV. Deijkers played six seasons for PSV, from 1973 to 1979, playing 170 matches scoring 35 goals.

== Personal life ==
In 2003, Deijkers died from a heart attack. He was married to Nel and is the father of techno producer Martyn.

== Honours ==
PSV

- Eredivisie: 1974–75, 1975–76, 1977–78
- KNVB Cup: 1973–74, 1975–76
- UEFA Cup: 1977–78

Individual

- UEFA Cup Top Scorer: 1977–78
- Eredivisie Top Scorer: 1977–78
