= Marseille turn =

Specialised dribbling skill in football

The Marseille turn, also known as the 360, the Spin, the Mooresy Roulette, the Roulette, the Girosflin, and the double drag-back, is a specialised dribbling skill unique to the game of association football. With so many different names, the exact origin of this skill move is unknown, though it was allegedly invented by Argentine midfielder José Farías. It was then popularized in Europe by French striker Yves Mariot in the 1970s. Diego Maradona, Michael Laudrup and Zinedine Zidane were arguably the most notable exponents of the move, and thus it has also been known as the Maradona turn, Laudrup-finten and the Zidane turn.

== Variations ==
French footballer Zinedine Zidane was known to use different variations of the Marseille turn. Instead of using his sole to drag the ball back in the move's first phase, Zidane sometimes used the inside of the foot, especially when performing the move while running at high speed.

Franck Ribéry and Aiden McGeady have also performed slightly modified versions of the spin. The modifications include dragging the ball behind their standing foot instead of to the side during the first phase, while in the third phase the outside of the boot is used instead of the sole.

The Aiden McGeady variation, known as the McGeady spin, has been included in EA Sports' FIFA video game series.

== Uses and effectiveness ==
The first drag back enables the player to retain control of the ball by removing the ball from the arc of the opposing player's tackle. The body spin positions the back of the dribbling player's body in between the opposing player and the ball to shield the ball. When performed at speed, the maneuver is almost impossible to defend against as it incorporates a sudden change in direction with a continuous shielding of the ball.

== See also ==
- Dummy/feint
- Flip flap
- Cruyff turn
- Dribble
