= André Guesdon =

French footballer (1948–2020)

Personal information
- Date of birth: 14 October 1948
- Place of birth: Benouville, France
- Date of death: 14 September 2020 (aged 71)
- Height: 1.78 m (5 ft 10 in)
- Position: Defender

Senior career*
Years	Team	Apps	(Gls)
1967–1971	Caen		
1971–1976	Monaco	121	(4)
1976–1978	Bastia	54	(0)
1978	Bordeaux	8	(0)
1978–1981	Nice	71	(2)

Managerial career
- 1984–1988: Viry-Châtillon
- 1995: Angers
- 1995–1997: Angers
- 2008–2009: Brest
- * Club domestic league appearances and goals

André Guesdon (14 October 1948 – 14 September 2020) was a French professional footballer who played as a defender.

He was part of SC Bastia team that reached 1978 UEFA Cup Final.

Guesdon died on 14 September 2020, aged 71.
