= Patrick Cubaynes =

French footballer (born 1960)

Personal information
- Date of birth: 6 May 1960 (age 66)
- Place of birth: Nîmes, France
- Height: 1.75 m (5 ft 9 in)
- Position: Striker

Youth career
- Avignon Football 84

Senior career*
Years	Team	Apps	(Gls)
1979–1985	Nîmes	133	(73)
1985–1986	Bastia	18	(4)
1986	Strasbourg	12	(7)
1986–1987	Marseille	35	(8)
1987–1989	Montpellier	47	(8)
1989–1991	Avignon Football 84	56	(31)
1991–1992	Pau FC	22	(14)
Total		323	(145)

International career
1984	France Olympic team		
Medal record
Men's football
Representing France
Gold medal – first place	1984 Los Angeles	Team competition
- * Club domestic league appearances and goals

Patrick Cubaynes (born 6 May 1960) is a French former professional footballer who played as a striker.

== International career ==
Cubaynes was a member of the French squad that won the gold medal at the 1984 Summer Olympics in Los Angeles, California.

== Personal life ==
In January 2017, at the age of 56 he played for the reserve team of US Saint-Didier.
