= Jean-Louis Cazes =

French footballer (born 1951)

Personal information
- Date of birth: 2 October 1951 (age 75)
- Place of birth: Bayonne, France
- Height: 1.75 m (5 ft 9 in)
- Position: Defender

Senior career*
Years	Team	Apps	(Gls)
?–1973	Aviron Bayonnais		
1973–1975	Saint-Étienne		
1975–1984	Bastia	276	(7)

Managerial career
- Genêts Anglet
- * Club domestic league appearances and goals

Jean-Louis Cazes (born 2 October 1951) is a French former professional footballer who played as a defender. He manages Genêts Anglet.

He was part of SC Bastia team that reached the 1978 UEFA Cup Final.
