= André Burkhard =

French footballer (born 1950)

Personal information
- Date of birth: 6 November 1950 (age 75)
- Place of birth: Benfeld, France
- Position: Defender

Youth career
- ASPV Strasbourg

Senior career*
Years	Team	Apps	(Gls)
1969–1970	ASPV Strasbourg		
1970–1973	Strasbourg	99	(13)
1973–1980	Bastia	217	(2)
1980–1981	FC Le Puy		
1981–1982	FC Grenoble	14	(0)
- * Club domestic league appearances and goals

André Burkhard (born 6 November 1950) is a French former professional footballer who played as a defender. He was part of SC Bastia team that reached 1978 UEFA Cup Final. Burkhard made 69 Ligue 1 appearances over three seasons with RC Strasbourg.
