= 1973–74 KNVB Cup =

Tournament details
- Country: Netherlands
- Teams: 46

Final positions
- Champions: PSV
- Runners-up: NAC

The 1973-74 KNVB Cup was the 56th edition of the Dutch national football annual knockout tournament for the KNVB Cup. 46 teams contested, beginning on 26 September 1973 and ending at the final on 1 May 1974.

NAC unsuccessfully defended on 1 May 1974 in De Kuip, Rotterdam its 1973 title losing the 1974 KNVB Cup to PSV, 6–0. 38,000 attending. It was PSV's second title.

== Teams ==
- All 18 participants of the Eredivisie 1973-74, entering in the second round
- All 20 participants of the Eerste Divisie 1973-74
- 8 teams from lower (amateur) leagues

== First round ==
26 September 1973
Almania _{A}	0–2	Fortuna SC _{1}
Excelsior _{1}	1–0	FC Eindhoven _{1}
FC Den Bosch _{1}	2–1 (aet)	SC Cambuur _{1}
FC Dordrecht _{1}	1–4	Willem II _{1}
FC VVV _{1}	4–1	SVV _{1}
Fortuna Vlaardingen _{1}	1–1 (p)	SC Amersfoort _{1}
SV Hoofddorp _{A}	0–5	sc Heerenveen _{1}
VV Hoogeveen _{A}	1–4	Vitesse Arnhem _{1}
IJsselmeervogels _{A}	1–3	PEC Zwolle _{1}
DVV Labor _{A}	0–3	FC Wageningen _{1}
VV Noordwijk _{A}	2–2 (p)	Helmond Sport _{1}
TOP Oss _{A}	2–1	Veendam _{1}
FC Volendam _{1}	4–1	De Volewijckers _{1}
Xerxes Rotterdam _{A}	2–2 (p)	Heracles _{1}

_{1} Eerste Divisie; _{A} Amateur teams

== Second round ==
The Eredivisie teams entered this round.

November 11 and December 30, 1973
De Graafschap _{E}	1–2 (aet)	FC Groningen _{E}
Excelsior	3–1 (aet)	TOP Oss
FC Den Bosch	2–0	FC Den Haag _{E}
FC Twente _{E}	2–0	FC VVV
FC Utrecht _{E}	4–1	Heracles
Fortuna SC	0–1	FC Amsterdam _{E}
HFC Haarlem _{E}	1–2 (aet)	AZ'67 _{E}
sc Heerenveen	1–1 (p)	Feyenoord _{E}
NAC _{E}	4–2	Go Ahead Eagles _{E}
NEC _{E}	1–0	SC Amersfoort
PEC Zwolle	1–2	Sparta _{E}
PSV _{E}	2–0	Vitesse Arnhem
Roda JC _{E}	0–1	Ajax _{E}
Telstar _{E}	1–0 (aet)	MVV _{E}
FC Wageningen	1–1 (p)	Helmond Sport
Willem II	2–2 (p)	FC Volendam

_{E} Eredivisie

== Third round ==
January 20 and February 24, 1974
Excelsior	0–1	PSV
FC Amsterdam	0–1	Feyenoord
FC Den Bosch	0–0 (p)	Sparta
FC Twente	0–2	Ajax
FC Utrecht	2–0	Willem II
NAC	1–0	Helmond Sport
NEC	1–2	FC Groningen
Telstar	1–1 (p)	AZ'67

== From quarterfinals to final ==
Quarter-finals
13 March
Ajax (aet)	2
AZ'67	1
13 March
PSV	2
Feyenoord	0
13 March
FC Utrecht	3
FC Den Bosch	1
24 February
NAC	4
FC Groningen	0

Semi-finals
3 April
Ajax	1
PSV	2
3 April
FC Utrecht	2
NAC	3

Final
1 May
PSV	6
NAC	0

=== Details of the final ===
1 May 1974

PSV	6–0	NAC
Deijkers 10'; R. van de Kerkhof 40'; Van der Kuijlen 51', 58', 90'; Edström 53'

De Kuip, Rotterdam
Attendance: 38,000
Referee: Leo van der Kroft

PSV would participate in the Cup Winners' Cup.
