= François Félix =

French footballer (born 1949)

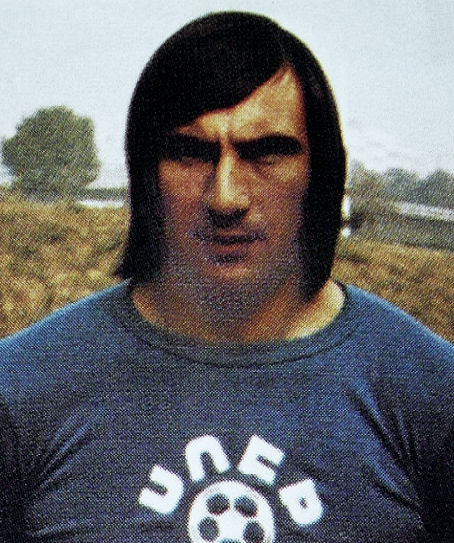
- Felix in 1975

Personal information
- Date of birth: 19 May 1949 (age 77)
- Place of birth: Viviers, France
- Height: 1.75 m (5 ft 9 in)
- Position: Striker

Youth career
- 1957–1965: ASSU Lyon
- 1965–1968: Saint-Priest

Senior career*
Years	Team	Apps	(Gls)
1968–1971	Lyon	31	(5)
1971–1973	Bastia	74	(31)
1973–1974	Paris FC	36	(19)
1974–1975	Nîmes	44	(10)
1975–1978	Bastia	86	(32)
1978–1980	Angers	65	(22)
1980–1982	Auxerre	4	(1)
Total		340	(120)

Managerial career
- 1982–1984: Auxerre (Assistant coach)
- 1984–1989: Tonnerre
- 1989–2008: FAIRM Île-Rousse Monticello
- 2017–2018: FAIRM Île-Rousse Monticello
- * Club domestic league appearances and goals

François Félix (born 19 May 1949), nicknamed Fanfan, is a French former professional footballer who played as a striker.

He was part of SC Bastia team that reached 1978 UEFA Cup Final.
