= Abdelkrim Merry =

Moroccan footballer

Krimau
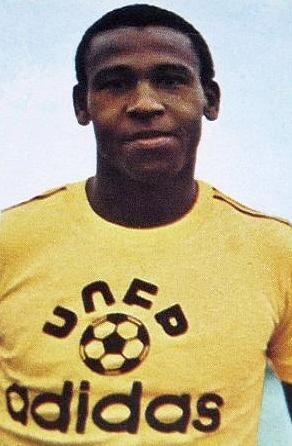
- Krimau in 1974

Personal information
- Full name: Abdelkrim Merry
- Date of birth: 13 January 1955 (age 71)
- Place of birth: Casablanca, Morocco
- Height: 1.82 m (6 ft 0 in)
- Position: Striker

Youth career
- Espérance Casablanca

Senior career*
Years	Team	Apps	(Gls)
1974–1980	Bastia	93	(22)
1980–1981	Lille	35	(12)
1981-1982	Toulouse	29	(8)
1982–1983	Metz	36	(23)
1983–1984	Strasbourg	24	(3)
1984–1985	Tours	35	(6)
1985–1986	Le Havre	34	(17)
1986–1987	Saint-Étienne	30	(9)
1987–1989	Matra Racing	50	(10)
Total		366	(110)

International career
1976–1989	Morocco	13	(5)

Managerial career
- 2012–: Olympique Marrakech
- * Club domestic league appearances and goals

Abdelkrim Merry (Arabic: عبد الكريم ميري; born 13 January 1955), nicknamed Krimau (Arabic: كريمو), is a Moroccan former professional footballer who played as a striker.

== Club career ==
Born in Casablanca, Morocco, Krimau spent his entire professional career in France, reaching the 1978 UEFA Cup Final with SC Bastia.

== International career ==
Krimau was part of the Morocco national team's squad at the 1986 FIFA World Cup, and scored one goal in a 3–1 win against Portugal. In 13 international matches from 1976 to 1989, Krimau scored five goals.

== Coaching career ==
In the summer of 2012, Krimau started his coaching career with Olympique Marrakech.

== Retirement ==
Krimau appears every week in a TV Show called Prolongation on Arryadia TV.
