= Marc Weller =

French footballer (born 1951)

Personal information
- Date of birth: 27 October 1951 (age 75)
- Place of birth: Mutzig, France
- Height: 1.83 m (6 ft 0 in)
- Position: Goalkeeper

Youth career
- Mutzig

Senior career*
Years	Team	Apps	(Gls)
1970–1974	Angers	0	(0)
1974–1979	Bastia	81	(0)
1979–1981	Toulouse	39	(0)
1982–1983	Toulouse	23	(0)
1983–1984	Stade Quimpérois		
- * Club domestic league appearances and goals

Marc Weller (born 27 October 1951) is a French former professional footballer who played as a goalkeeper.

He was part of the SC Bastia team that reached the 1978 UEFA Cup Final.
