= SC Bastia in European football =

French club in European football

This page presents the complete history of games played by the Sporting Club Bastia since 1972.

Since its founding in 1905, the Sporting Club Bastia participated: 2 seasons the European Cup Winners' Cup, 2 seasons in the UEFA Cup (one final), and 3 seasons the UEFA Intertoto Cup (one title, one semifinal).

== UEFA Cup ==
=== 1977–78 ===
Round	Club	1. match	Total	2. match	Club
End of 64	Bastia	3–2	5–3	2–1	(Portugal) Sporting Lizbon
End of 32	Bastia	2–1	5–2	3–1	(England) Newcastle United
End of 16	Bastia	2–1	5–3	3–2	(Italy) Torino FC
Quarter-final	Bastia	7–2	9–6	2–4	(East Germany) FC Carl Zeiss Jena
Semi-final	Bastia	3–2	3–3	0–1	(Switzerland) Grasshopper Zurich
Final	Bastia	0–0	0–3	0–3	(Netherlands) PSV Eindhoven

=== 1997–98 ===
Round	Club	1. match	Total	2. match	Club
End of 64	Bastia	1–0	1–0	0–0	(Portugal) Benfica
End of 32	(Romania) Steaua Bucharest	1–0	3–3	2–3	Bastia

== European Cup Winners' Cup ==
=== 1971–72 ===
Round	Club	1. match	Total	2. match	Club
End of 32	Bastia	0–0	1–2	1–2	(Spain) Atlético de Madrid

=== 1981–82 ===
Round	Club	1. match	Total	2. match	Club
End of 32	(Finland) FC KooTeePee	0–0	0–5	0–5	Bastia
End of 16	Bastia	1–1	2–4	1–3	(Soviet Union) Dinamo Tbilisi

== UEFA Intertoto Cup ==
=== 1997–98 ===
Round	Club	1. match	Total	2. match	Club
Group 2, 1. match	(Croatia) NK Hrvatski Dragovoljac	0–1			Bastia
Group 2, 2. match	Bastia	1–0			(Denmark) Silkeborg IF
Group 2, 3. match	(Wales) Ebbw Vale	1–2			Bastia
Group 2, 4. match	Bastia	1–2			(Austria) Grazer AK
Semi-finals	(Germany) Hamburg	0–1	1–2	1–1 (a.e.t.)	Bastia
Finals	(Sweden) Halmstads BK	0–1	1–2	1–1 (a.e.t.)	Bastia

=== 1998–99 ===
Round	Club	1. match	Total	2. match	Club
2. round	(North Macedonia) Makedonija GP	1–0	1–7	0–7	Bastia
3. round	Bastia	2–0	4–3	2–3 (a.e.t.)	(Turkey) Altay
Semi-finals	SC Bastia	2–0	2–4	0–4	(Serbia) Vojvodina Novi Sad

=== 2001–02 ===
Round	Club	1. match	Total	2. match	Club
2. round	(Croatia) Slaven Belupo	1–0	2–0	1–0	Bastia

== Statistics ==
=== By competition ===
Competition	Pld	W	D	L	GF	GA	GD	Win% (Note: Win% is rounded to two decimal places)
Champions League / European Cup	0	0	0	0	0	0	+0	—
Cup Winners' Cup	6	1	3	2	8	6	+2	16.67
Europa League / UEFA Cup / Inter-Cities Fairs Cup	16	10	2	4	30	24	+6	62.50
Super Cup	0	0	0	0	0	0	+0	—
Intertoto Cup	22	10	3	9	22	15	+7	45.45
Intercontinental Cup	0	0	0	0	0	0	+0	—
Club World Cup	0	0	0	0	0	0	+0	—
Toplam	44	21	8	15	60	45	+15	47.73

=== By country ===
Country	Pld	W	D	L	GF	GA	GD	Win%
Austria	1	0	0	1	1	2	−1	0.00
Croatia	3	1	0	2	1	2	−1	33.33
Denmark	1	1	0	0	1	0	+1	100.00
East Germany	2	1	0	1	9	6	+3	50.00
Finland	2	1	1	0	5	0	+5	50.00
Germany / West Germany	2	1	1	0	2	1	+1	50.00
Italy	2	2	0	0	5	3	+2	100.00
Macedonia	2	1	0	1	7	1	+6	50.00
Netherlands	2	0	1	1	0	3	−3	0.00
Portugal	4	3	1	0	6	3	+3	75.00
Romania	2	1	0	1	3	3	+0	50.00
Serbia	2	1	0	1	2	4	−2	50.00
Spain	3	0	1	2	1	2	−1	0.00
Sweden	2	1	1	0	2	1	+1	50.00
Switzerland	2	1	0	1	3	3	+0	50.00
Turkey	2	1	0	1	4	3	+1	50.00
Wales	1	1	0	0	1	2	−1	100.00
