= Philippe Levenard =

French footballer (born 1965)

Personal information
- Date of birth: 6 February 1965 (age 61)
- Place of birth: Pero-Casevecchie, France
- Height: 1.78 m (5 ft 10 in)
- Position: Defender

Senior career*
Years	Team	Apps	(Gls)
1983–1986	Bastia	9	(0)
1986–1987	Gazélec Ajaccio	20	(2)
1987–1988	Sedan		
1988–1994	Angers	140	(7)
1994–1997	Lille	74	(0)
1997	Rennes	2	(0)
1998	Borgo FC		
- * Club domestic league appearances and goals

Philippe Levenard (born 6 February 1965) is a French former professional footballer who played as a defender.
