= Gérard Soler =

French footballer (born 1954)

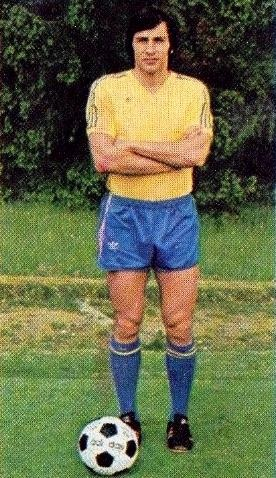
- Panini Football 1977

Personal information
- Date of birth: 29 March 1954 (age 72)
- Place of birth: Oujda, French Morocco
- Height: 1.76 m (5 ft 9 in)
- Position: Striker

Youth career
- AS Poissy

Senior career*
| Years | Team | Apps | (Gls) |
| 1972–1978 | Sochaux | 161 | (69) |
| 1978–1979 | Monaco | 28 | (9) |
| 1979–1982 | Bordeaux | 91 | (16) |
| 1982–1984 | Toulouse | 58 | (19) |
| 1984–1985 | Strasbourg | 32 | (6) |
| 1985–1986 | Bastia | 23 | (6) |
| 1986 | Lille | 13 | (5) |
| 1986–1987 | Rennes | 23 | (1) |
| 1987–1988 | Orléans | 23 | (9) |
| Total | | 452 | (140) |

International career
| 1974–1983 | France | 16 | (4) |

Managerial career
- 2000: Saint-Étienne
- * Club domestic league appearances and goals

Gérard Soler (born 29 March 1954) is a French former professional footballer who played as a forward or attacking midfielder. He played from 1972 until 1988, for Sochaux, Monaco, Bordeaux, Toulouse, Strasbourg, Bastia, Lille, Rennes and Orléans, where he retired. He briefly worked as a coach at Saint-Étienne in 2000.

Soler represented France at the 1982 World Cup, scoring their goal in a 3–1 defeat to England in Bilbao. He was the only player to score against England in the tournament. In total, Soler won 16 caps for France between 16 November 1974 and 31 May 1983, scoring four goals.

In May 2018, Soler was appointed president of the newly formed football club C'Chartres Football.
