= René van de Kerkhof =

Dutch footballer

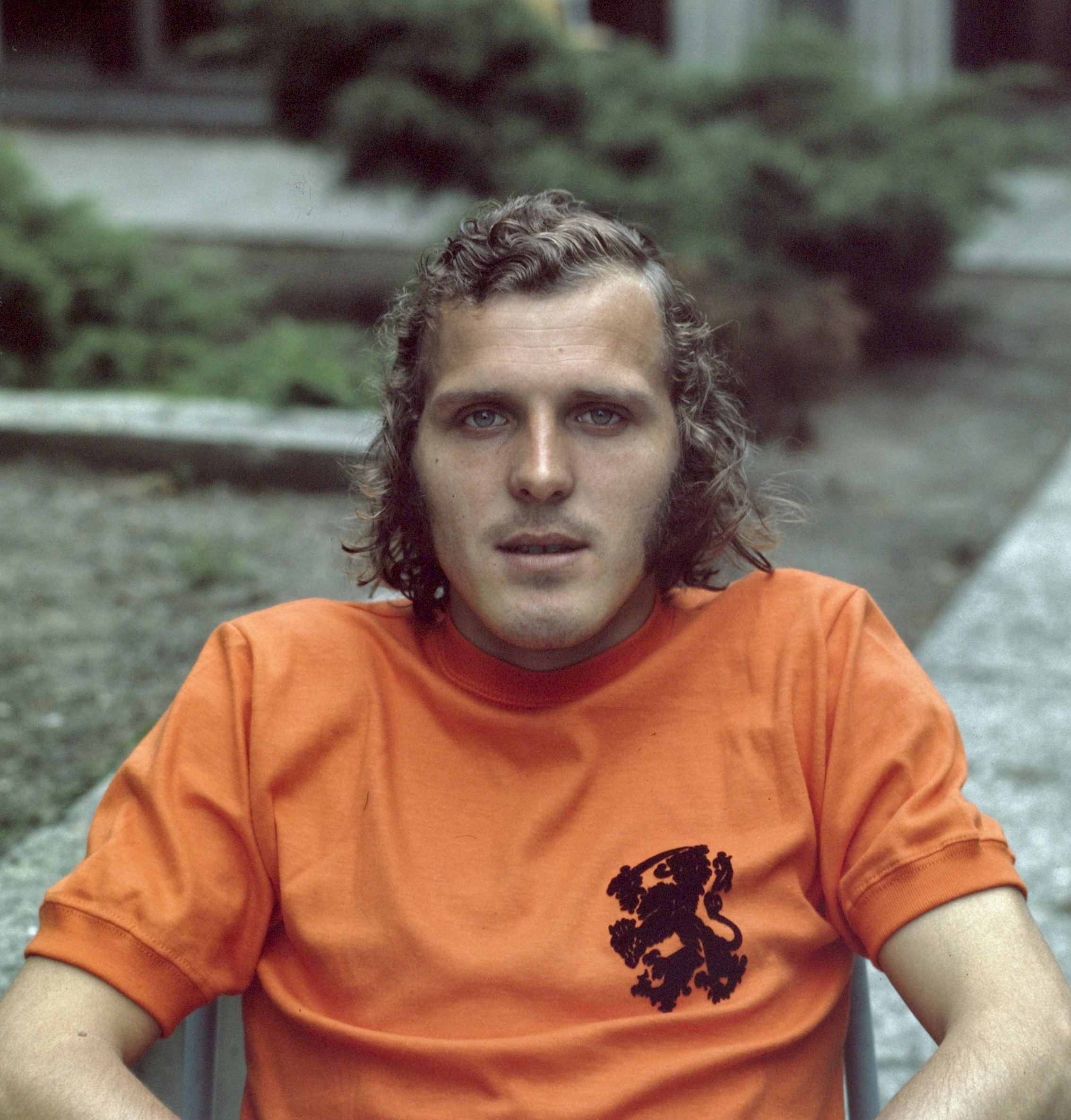
- Van de Kerkhof in 1974

Personal information
- Full name: Reinier Lambertus van de Kerkhof
- Date of birth: 16 September 1951 (age 75)
- Place of birth: Helmond, Netherlands
- Position: Right winger

Youth career
- Twente

Senior career*
Years	Team	Apps	(Gls)
1970–1973	Twente	99	(34)
1973–1983	PSV Eindhoven	278	(85)
1983–1984	Apollon Athens	23	(3)
1984–1985	Seiko	14	(8)
1985–1988	Helmond Sport	61	(8)
1988–1989	FC Eindhoven	30	(3)
Total		505	(141)

International career
1973–1982	Netherlands	47	(5)
Medal record
Men's football
Representing Netherlands
FIFA World Cup
Runner-up	1974 West Germany
Runner-up	1978 Argentina
European Championship
Third place	1976 Yugoslavia
- * Club domestic league appearances and goals

Reinier Lambertus "René" van de Kerkhof (Dutch pronunciation: [ˈrɛiniːr lɑmˈbɛrtʏs rəˈneː vɑn də ˈkɛr(ə)kɦɔf]; born 16 September 1951) is a Dutch former professional footballer who played as a right winger for FC Twente, PSV Eindhoven and the Netherlands national team.

== Career ==
Van de Kerkhof and his twin brother Willy were squad members of the Dutch national team that made the World Cup final in 1974 and became key players in the team that made the 1978 final, losing to hosts West Germany and Argentina, respectively. He also played for the Netherlands at the Euro 1976 and Euro 1980. Overall, Van de Kerkhof appeared 47 times for his country, scoring five goals.

He is well remembered due to the incident before the 1978 World Cup final, when the opponent Argentina national team objected to the cast he wore on his injured forearm since it could have injured an Argentinian player. Despite the bandage having been passed by FIFA and worn in previous matches, the referee, Italian Sergio Gonella vacillated. The Dutch players threatened to walk off the field in protest, delaying the kickoff of the game. Finally an extra layer of padding was applied to the bandage as a solution, and the match could start.

1978 was his most successful year, besides becoming runners-up at the World Cup, he also won the UEFA Cup, the Dutch championship and the KNVB Beker with PSV that year: "we had won everything possible – the title, the Dutch Cup and the UEFA Cup, and we had five or six players who had been runners-up at the FIFA World Cup in Argentina with the Netherlands. It was a beautiful period under manager Kees Rijvers", Van de Kerkhof later would tell to Berend Scholten.

Van de Kerkhof was named by Pelé as one of the top 125 greatest living footballers in March 2004.

== Career statistics ==
=== Club ===
Appearances and goals by club, season and competition
Club	Season	League			National Cup		League Cup		Continental		Total	
Club	Season	Division	Apps	Goals	Apps	Goals	Apps	Goals	Apps	Goals	Apps	Goals
Twente	1970–71	Eredivisie	33	12								
Twente	1971–72	Eredivisie	32	10								
Twente	1972–73	Eredivisie	34	12								
Twente	Total		99	34								
PSV Eindhoven	1973–74	Eredivisie	31	20								
PSV Eindhoven	1974–75	Eredivisie	30	9								
PSV Eindhoven	1975–76	Eredivisie	34	8								
PSV Eindhoven	1976–77	Eredivisie	28	9								
PSV Eindhoven	1977–78	Eredivisie	29	10								
PSV Eindhoven	1978–79	Eredivisie	27	8								
PSV Eindhoven	1979–80	Eredivisie	29	3								
PSV Eindhoven	1980–81	Eredivisie	18	1								
PSV Eindhoven	1981–82	Eredivisie	29	9								
PSV Eindhoven	1982–83	Eredivisie	23	8								
PSV Eindhoven	Total		278	85								
Apollon Athens	1983–84	Alpha Ethniki	23	3								
Seiko	1984–85	First Division	14	8	6	1						
Helmond Sport	1985–86	Eerste Divisie	14	4								
Helmond Sport	1986–87	Eerste Divisie	23	3								
Helmond Sport	1987–88	Eerste Divisie	24	1								
Helmond Sport	Total		61	8								
FC Eindhoven	1987–88	Eerste Divisie	11	1								
FC Eindhoven	1988–89	Eerste Divisie	19	2								
FC Eindhoven	Total		30	3								
Career total			505	141								

=== International ===
Appearances and goals by national team and year
National team	Year	Apps	Goals
Netherlands	1973	1	1
Netherlands	1974	2	0
Netherlands	1975	2	1
Netherlands	1976	5	0
Netherlands	1977	7	1
Netherlands	1978	14	1
Netherlands	1979	6	1
Netherlands	1980	6	0
Netherlands	1981	6	0
Netherlands	1982	14	0
Total		47	5

Scores and results list the Netherlands' goal tally first, score column indicates score after each Van de Kerkhof goal.

List of international goals scored by René van de Kerkhof
No.	Date	Venue	Opponent	Score	Result	Competition
1	29 August 1973	De Adelaarshorst, Deventer, Netherlands	Iceland	5–1	8–1	1974 FIFA World Cup qualification
2	10 September 1975	Stadion Śląski, Chorzów, Poland	Poland	1–4	1–4	UEFA Euro 1976 qualification
3	26 October 1977	Olympisch stadion, Amsterdam, Netherlands	Belgium	1–0	1–0	1978 FIFA World Cup qualification
4	18 June 1978	Estadio Córdoba, Córdoba, Argentina	West Germany	2–2	2–2	1978 FIFA World Cup
5	21 November 1979	Zentralstadion, Leipzig, German Democratic Republic	East Germany	3–2	3–2	UEFA Euro 1980 qualification

== Honours ==
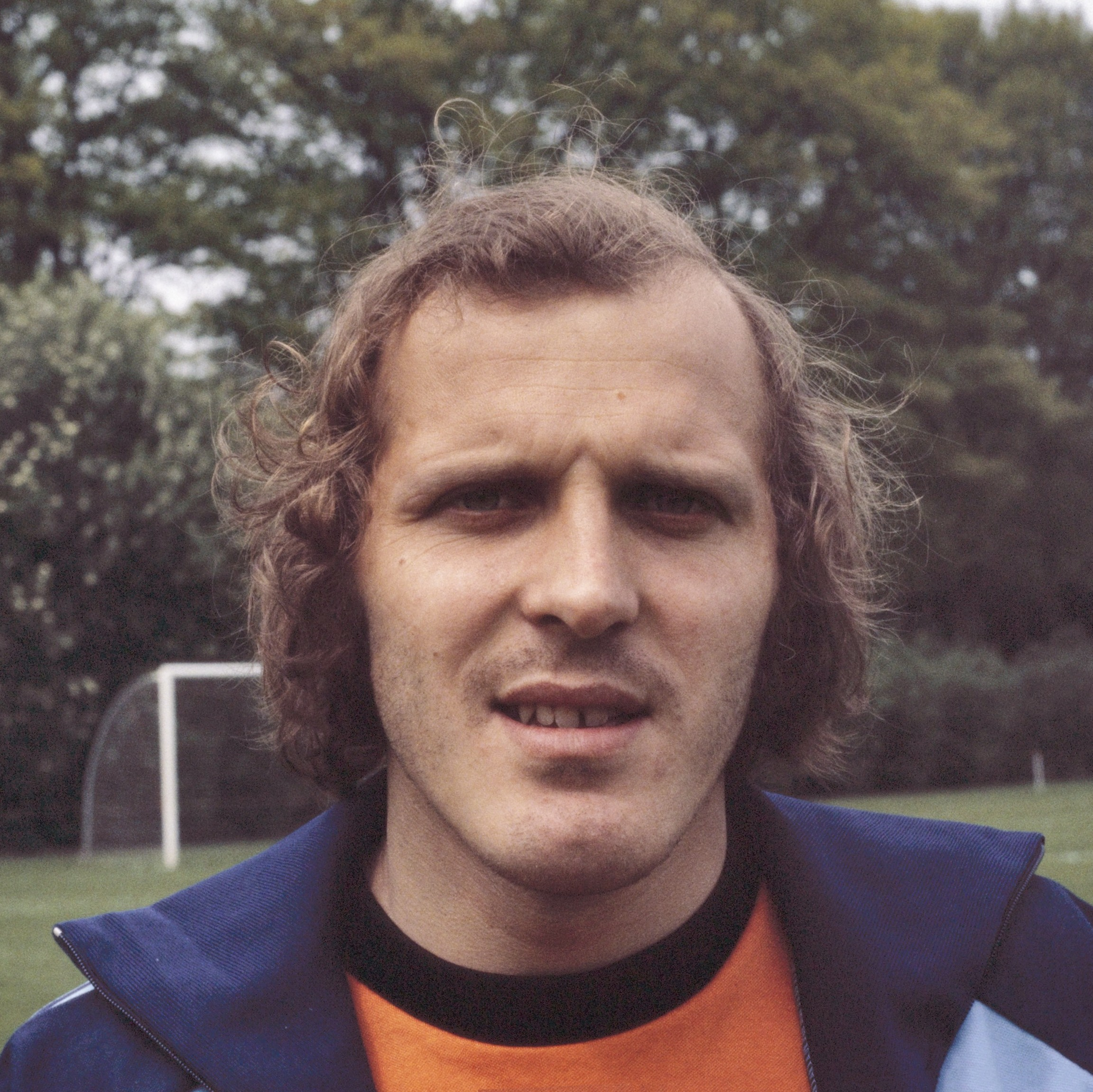
René van de Kerkhof in 1978

PSV Eindhoven

- Eredivisie: 1974–75, 1975–76, 1977–78
- KNVB Cup: 1973–74, 1975–76
- UEFA Cup: 1977–78

Seiko

- Hong Kong First Division: 1984–85
- Hong Kong Senior Shield: 1984–85

Netherlands

- FIFA World Cup runner-up: 1974, 1978
- UEFA European Championship third place: 1976
- Tournoi de Paris: 1978

Individual

- FIFA 100
