= Paul Squaglia =

French footballer (born 1964)

Personal information
- Full name: Paul Squaglia
- Date of birth: 3 July 1964 (age 62)
- Place of birth: Bastia, France
- Height: 1.76 m (5 ft 9 in)
- Position: Defender

Senior career*
Years	Team	Apps	(Gls)
1980–1986	Bastia	33	(0)
1986	Lyon	5	(0)
1986–1989	Chamois Niortais	101	(1)
1989–1991	Nîmes	36	(0)
Total		175	(1)
- * Club domestic league appearances and goals

Paul Squaglia (born 3 July 1964) is a French former professional footballer who played as a central defender.
