= Pierre Cahuzac =

French footballer and manager (1927-2003)

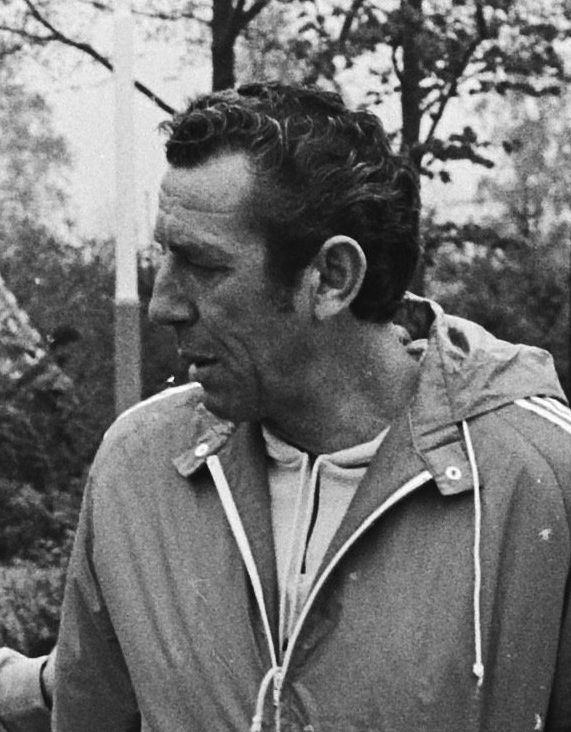
- Cahuzac in 1978

Personal information
- Date of birth: 3 July 1927
- Place of birth: Saint-Pons, France
- Date of death: 31 August 2003 (aged 76)
- Place of death: Lavaur, France
- Position: Midfielder

Senior career*
Years	Team	Apps	(Gls)
1951–1952	AS Béziers		
1952–1960	Toulouse		

International career
1957	France	2	(0)

Managerial career
- 1961–1971: GFCO Ajaccio
- 1971–1979: Bastia
- 1979–1983: Toulouse
- 1984–1985: Marseille
- * Club domestic league appearances and goals

Pierre Cahuzac (3 July 1927 – 31 August 2003) was a French football player and manager who played as a midfielder. As a manager, he led SC Bastia to the 1978 UEFA Cup Final.

His grandson Yannick Cahuzac is a professional footballer.
