= Jean-François Larios =

French footballer (born 1956)

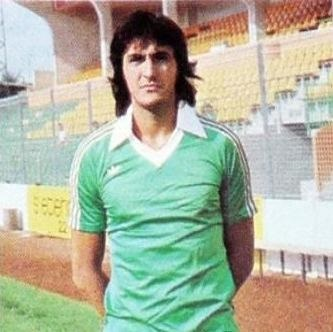
- Larios in 1979

Personal information
- Date of birth: 27 August 1956 (age 70)
- Place of birth: Sidi Bel Abbès, French Algeria
- Height: 1.86 m (6 ft 1 in)
- Position: Midfielder

Youth career
- Bourbaki de Pau
- Jeanne d'Arc du Béarn

Senior career*
Years	Team	Apps	(Gls)
1973–1982	Saint-Étienne	167	(36)
1977–1978	→ Bastia (loan)	34	(5)
1983	Atlético Madrid	0	(0)
1983	Montreal Manic	6	(1)
1984	Neuchâtel Xamax	13	(5)
1984–1985	Lyon	27	(1)
1985–1986	Strasbourg	19	(0)
1986–1987	Nice	19	(3)
1988	Montpellier	11	(0)
Total		296	(51)

International career
1978–1982	France	17	(5)
- * Club domestic league appearances and goals

Jean-François Larios (French pronunciation: [ʒɑ̃ fʁɑ̃swa laʁjɔs]; born 27 August 1956) is a French former professional football midfielder. He earned seventeen international caps (five goals) for the France national team during the late 1970s and early 1980s.

A player of Saint-Étienne, Larios was a member of the French squad in the 1982 FIFA World Cup. However, he played only two matches after rumours surfaced that he was having an affair with Michel Platini's wife. In 1983 Larios became one of the very few French players to appear in the North American Soccer League when he joined the Montreal Manic.
