= Yves Mariot =

French footballer (1948-2000)

Personal information
- Date of birth: 5 July 1948
- Place of birth: Nancy, France
- Date of death: 15 January 2000 (aged 51)
- Height: 1.78 m (5 ft 10 in)
- Position: Striker

Senior career*
Years	Team	Apps	(Gls)
1967–1973	Nancy	77	(8)
1973	Sedan	28	(3)
1973–1977	Lyon	114	(16)
1977–1978	Bastia	24	(1)
1978	Paris FC	10	(0)
1978–1980	Nice	27	(1)
Total		280	(29)

International career
1975	France	1	(0)
- * Club domestic league appearances and goals

Yves Mariot (5 July 1948 – 15 January 2000) was a French professional footballer who played as a striker. Born in Nancy, France, he began his career at AS Nancy and went on to play for Sedan, Lyon, Bastia, Paris FC, and Nice.

== Marseille turn ==
Mariot is known for first popularising the Marseille turn in Europe during the 1970s.

== See also ==
- Marseille turn
