= Félix Lacuesta =

French footballer (born 1958)

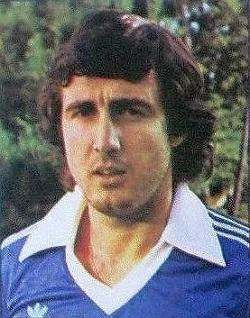
- Lacuesta with Bastia in 1978

Personal information
- Date of birth: 20 February 1958 (age 68)
- Place of birth: Bayonne, France
- Height: 1.85 m (6 ft 1 in)
- Position: Midfielder

Youth career
- Aviron Bayonnais
- Saint-Étienne

Senior career*
Years	Team	Apps	(Gls)
1974–1977	Saint-Étienne	15	(2)
1977–1979	Bastia	49	(4)
1979–1980	Bordeaux	32	(1)
1980–1981	Bastia	31	(3)
1981–1984	Strasbourg	90	(7)
1984–1985	Lyon	22	(2)
1985–1986	Bastia	17	(0)
1986	Monaco	12	(2)
1986–1987	Lille	31	(1)
1987–1990	Cannes	45	(2)
Total		344	(24)
- * Club domestic league appearances and goals

Félix Lacuesta (born 20 February 1958 in Bayonne) is a French former professional footballer who played as a midfielder.

He was part of SC Bastia team that reached 1978 UEFA Cup Final.
