= Willy van de Kerkhof =

Dutch former footballer (born 1951)

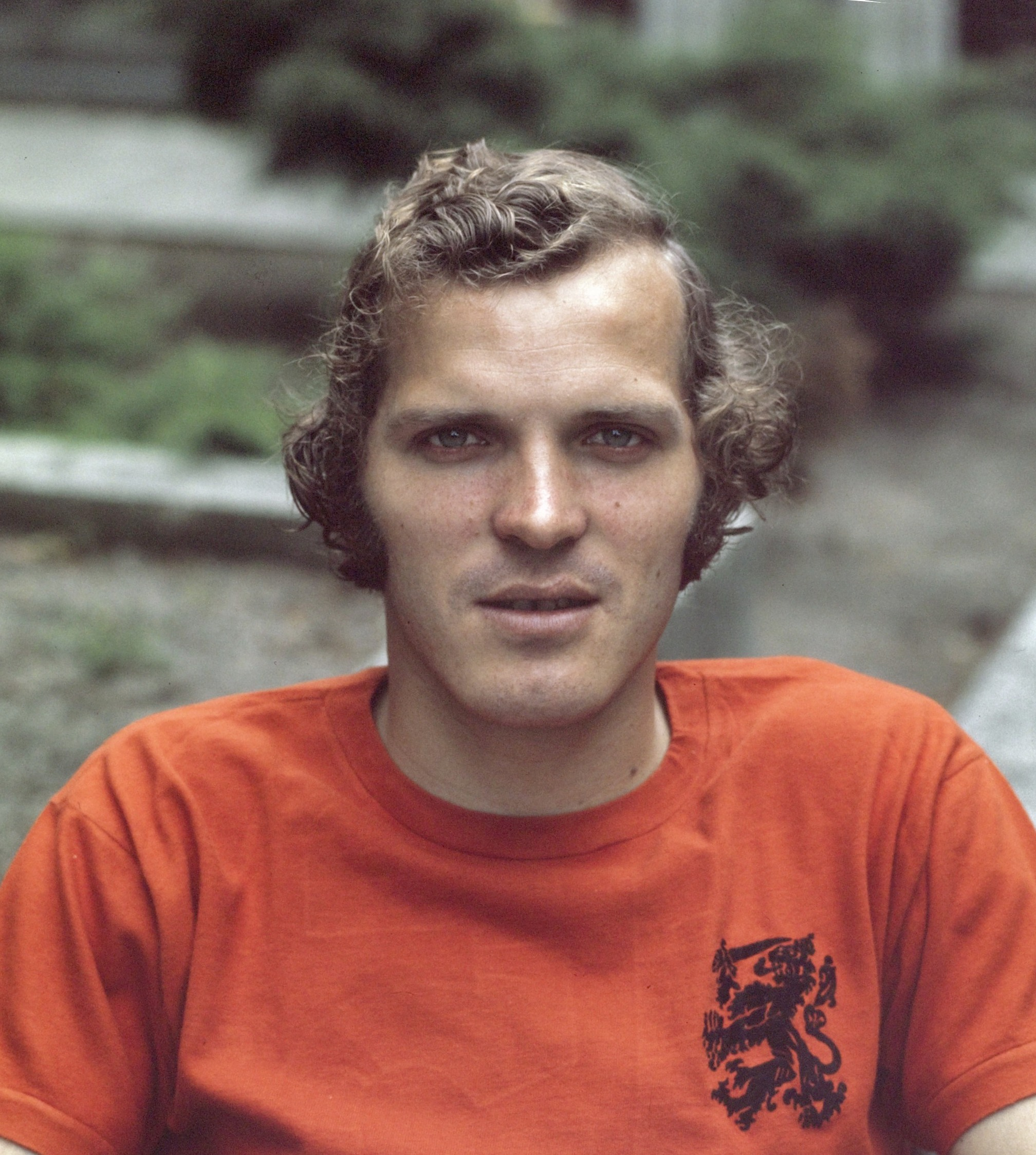
- Van de Kerkhof in 1974

Personal information
- Full name: Wilhelmus Antonius van de Kerkhof
- Date of birth: 16 September 1951 (age 75)
- Place of birth: Helmond, Netherlands
- Position: Midfielder

Youth career
- Twente

Senior career*
| Years | Team | Apps | (Gls) |
| 1970–1973 | Twente | 93 | (14) |
| 1973–1988 | PSV Eindhoven | 418 | (57) |
| Total | | 511 | (71) |

International career
| 1974–1985 | Netherlands | 63 | (5) |
Medal record
Men's football
Representing Netherlands
FIFA World Cup
| Runner-up | 1974 West Germany |
| Runner-up | 1978 Argentina |
European Championship
| Third place | 1976 Yugoslavia |
- * Club domestic league appearances and goals

Wilhelmus Antonius "Willy" van de Kerkhof (Dutch pronunciation: [ʋɪlˈɦɛlmʏs ɑnˈtoːnijəs ˈʋɪli vɑn də ˈkɛr(ə)kɦɔf]; born 16 September 1951) is a Dutch former professional footballer who played as a midfielder.

Van de Kerkhof and his twin brother René were squad members of the Netherlands national team that made the World Cup final in 1974 and became key players in the team that made the 1978 final. He also played for the Netherlands at the Euro 1976 and Euro 1980. Overall, Van de Kerkhof appeared 63 times for his national team, scoring five goals.

He was named by Pelé as one of the top 125 greatest living footballers in March 2004.

== Career statistics ==
=== Club ===
Appearances and goals by club, season and competition
| Club | Season | League | | | KNVB Cup | | Europe | | Total | |
| Club | Season | Division | Apps | Goals | Apps | Goals | Apps | Goals | Apps | Goals |
|---|---|---|---|---|---|---|---|---|---|---|
| Twente | 1970–71 | Eredivisie | 27 | 6 | | | 7 (Note: Appearances in Inter-Cities Fairs Cup) | 1 | 34 | 7 |
| Twente | 1971–72 | Eredivisie | 32 | 6 | | | – | | 32 | 6 |
| Twente | 1972–73 | Eredivisie | 34 | 2 | | | 10 (Note: Appearances in UEFA Cup) | 1 | 34 | 2 |
| Twente | Total | | 93 | 14 | | | 17 | 2 | 110 | 16 |
| PSV Eindhoven | 1973–74 | Eredivisie | 31 | 10 | | | – | | 31 | 10 |
| PSV Eindhoven | 1974–75 | Eredivisie | 32 | 7 | | | 7 (Note: Appearances in European Cup Winners' Cup) | 2 | 39 | 9 |
| PSV Eindhoven | 1975–76 | Eredivisie | 33 | 6 | | | 8 (Note: Appearances in European Cup) | 2 | 41 | 8 |
| PSV Eindhoven | 1976–77 | Eredivisie | 31 | 1 | | | 4 | 0 | 35 | 1 |
| PSV Eindhoven | 1977–78 | Eredivisie | 32 | 5 | | | 12 | 1 | 44 | 6 |
| PSV Eindhoven | 1978–79 | Eredivisie | 30 | 3 | | | 4 | 0 | 34 | 3 |
| PSV Eindhoven | 1979–80 | Eredivisie | 30 | 2 | | | 4 | 1 | 34 | 3 |
| PSV Eindhoven | 1980–81 | Eredivisie | 27 | 4 | | | 4 | 0 | 31 | 4 |
| PSV Eindhoven | 1981–82 | Eredivisie | 29 | 8 | | | 4 | 1 | 33 | 9 |
| PSV Eindhoven | 1982–83 | Eredivisie | 26 | 2 | | | 2 | 1 | 28 | 3 |
| PSV Eindhoven | 1983–84 | Eredivisie | 23 | 3 | | | 4 | 0 | 27 | 3 |
| PSV Eindhoven | 1984–85 | Eredivisie | 33 | 2 | | | 4 | 0 | 37 | 2 |
| PSV Eindhoven | 1985–86 | Eredivisie | 29 | 0 | | | 4 | 0 | 31 | 0 |
| PSV Eindhoven | 1986–87 | Eredivisie | 19 | 3 | | | 2 | 0 | 21 | 3 |
| PSV Eindhoven | 1987–88 | Eredivisie | 12 | 1 | | | 4 | 0 | 16 | 1 |
| PSV Eindhoven | Total | | 418 | 57 | | | 67 | 8 | 486 | 65 |
| Career total | | | 511 | 71 | | | 84 | 10 | 597 | 81 |

=== International ===
Appearances and goals by national team and year
| National team | Year | Apps | Goals |
|---|---|---|---|
| Netherlands | 1974 | 2 | 0 |
| Netherlands | 1975 | 1 | 0 |
| Netherlands | 1976 | 6 | 1 |
| Netherlands | 1977 | 6 | 1 |
| Netherlands | 1978 | 13 | 1 |
| Netherlands | 1979 | 6 | 1 |
| Netherlands | 1980 | 9 | 1 |
| Netherlands | 1981 | 4 | 0 |
| Netherlands | 1982 | 3 | 0 |
| Netherlands | 1983 | 5 | 0 |
| Netherlands | 1984 | 3 | 0 |
| Netherlands | 1985 | 5 | 0 |
| Total | | 63 | 5 |

Scores and results list the Netherlands' goal tally first, score column indicates score after each Van de Kerkhof goal.

List of international goals scored by Willy van de Kerkhof
| No. | Date | Venue | Opponent | Score | Result | Competition |
|---|---|---|---|---|---|---|
| 1 | 19 June 1976 | Stadion Maksimir, Zagreb, Yugoslavia | Yugoslavia | 2–0 | 3-2 | UEFA Euro 1976 |
| 2 | 12 October 1977 | Windsor Park, Belfast, Northern Ireland | Northern Ireland | 1–0 | 1–0 | 1978 FIFA World Cup qualification |
| 3 | 14 June 1978 | Estadio Córdoba, Córdoba, Argentina | Austria | 5–1 | 5–1 | 1978 FIFA World Cup |
| 4 | 5 September 1979 | Laugardalsvöllur, Reykjavík, Iceland | Iceland | 2–0 | 4–0 | UEFA Euro 1980 qualification |
| 5 | 14 June 1980 | Stadio San Paolo, Naples, Italy | West Germany | 2–3 | 2–3 | UEFA Euro 1980 |

== Honours ==
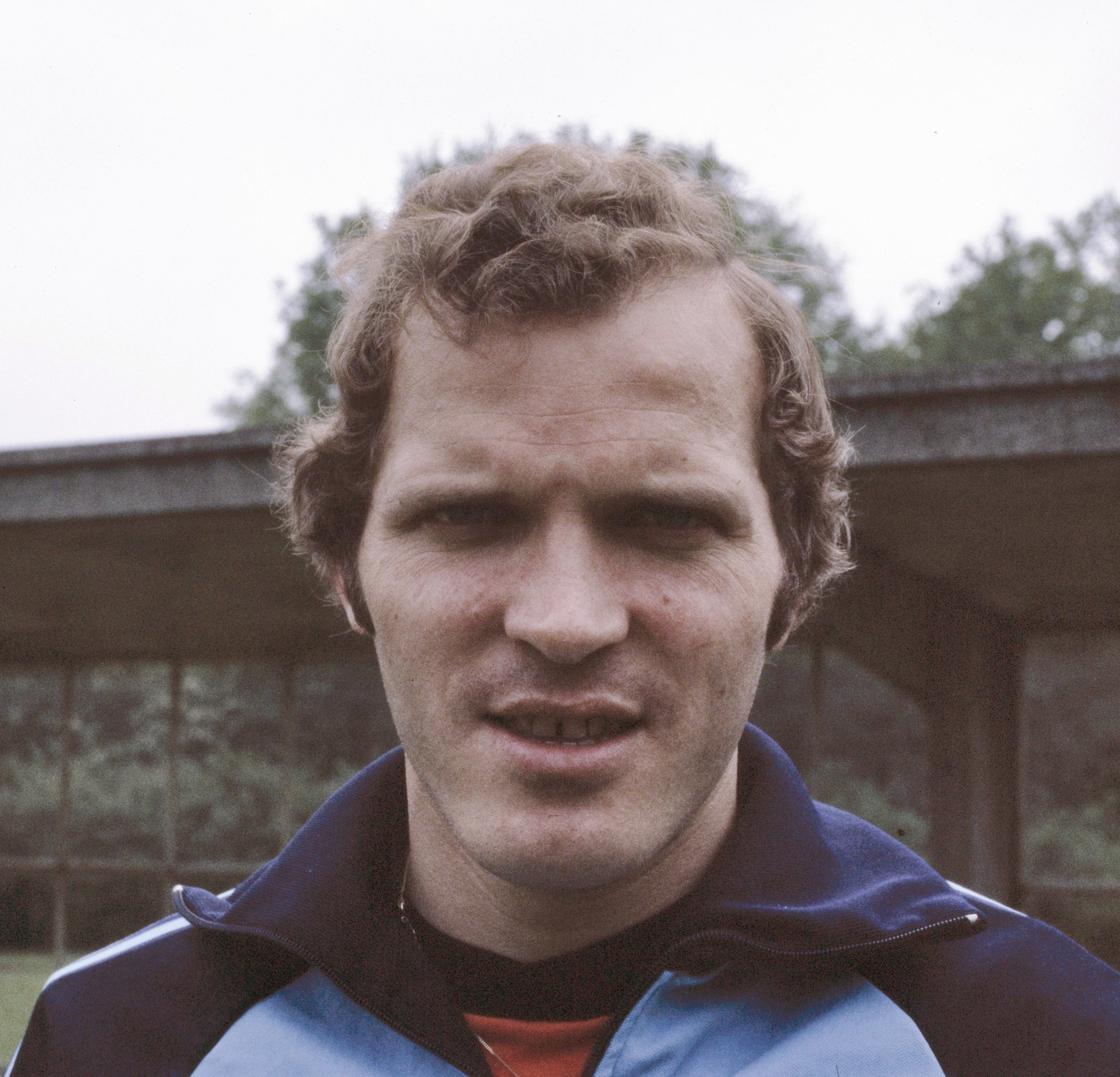
Willy van de Kerkhof in 1978

PSV Eindhoven

- Eredivisie: 1974–75, 1975–76, 1977–78, 1985–86, 1986–87, 1987–88
- KNVB Cup: 1973–74, 1975–76, 1987–88
- European Cup: 1987–88
- UEFA Cup: 1977–78

Netherlands

- FIFA World Cup runner-up: 1974, 1978
- UEFA European Championship third place: 1976
- Tournoi de Paris: 1978
