= Pierrick Hiard =

French footballer (born 1955)

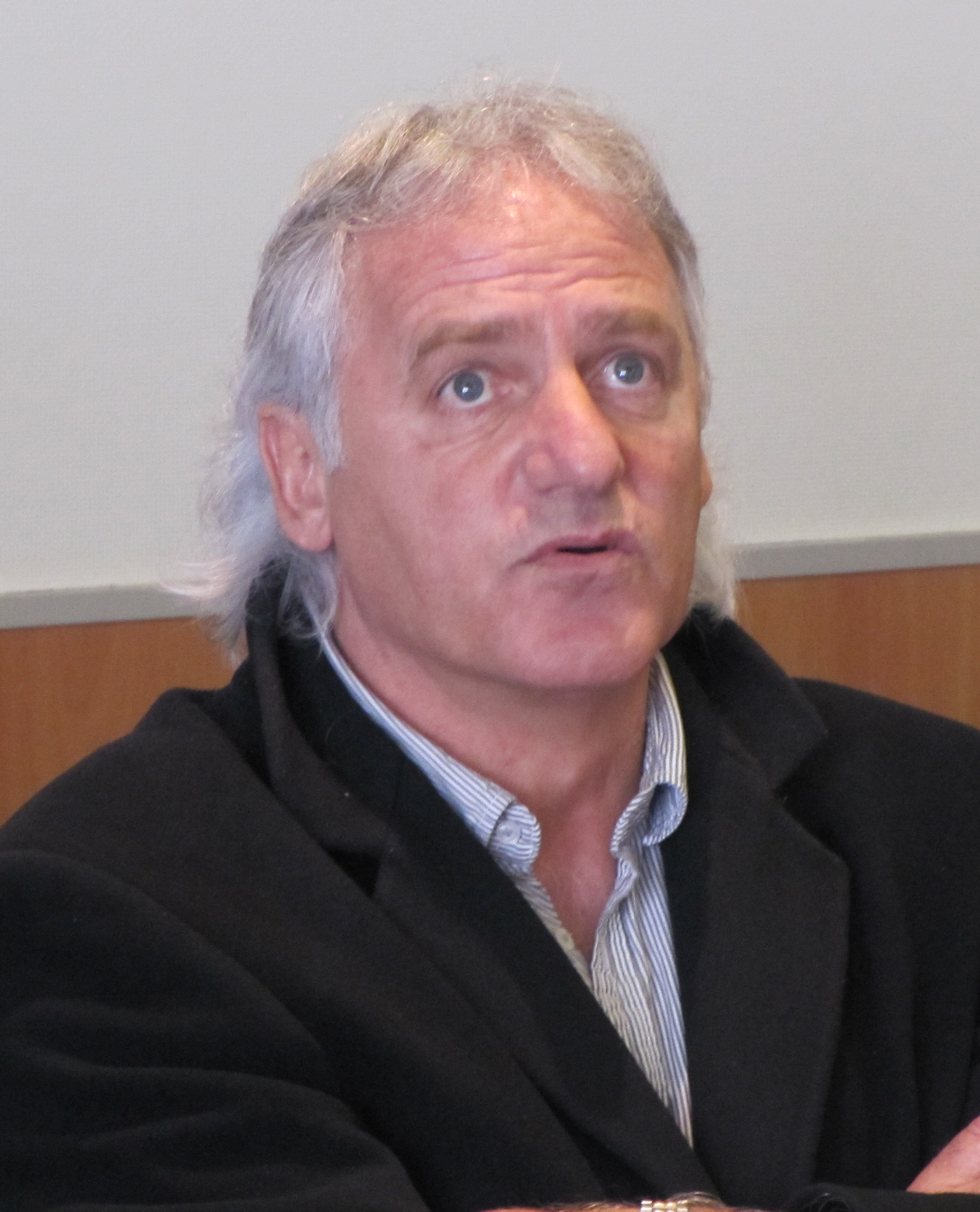
- Hiard in 2011

Personal information
- Date of birth: 27 April 1955 (age 71)
- Place of birth: Rennes, France
- Height: 1.80 m (5 ft 11 in)
- Position: Goalkeeper

Team information
- Current team: Rennes (scout)

Youth career
- 1965–1973: Rennes

Senior career*
| Years | Team | Apps | (Gls) |
| 1973–1977 | Rennes | | |
| 1977–1983 | Bastia | | |
| 1983–1992 | Rennes | | |

International career
| 1981 | France | 1 | (0) |
- * Club domestic league appearances and goals

Pierrick Hiard (born 27 April 1955) is a French former professional footballer who played as a goalkeeper.
