= Paul Marchioni =

French footballer (born 1955)

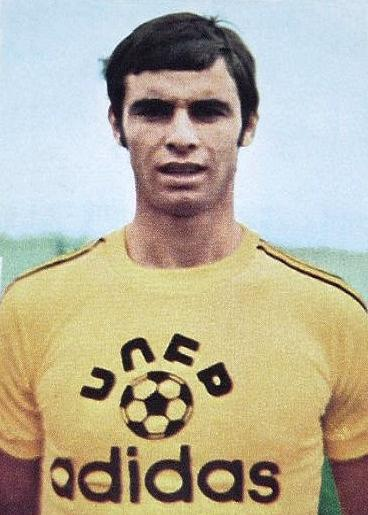
- Marchioni in 1974

Personal information
- Date of birth: 1 January 1955 (age 71)
- Place of birth: Corte, Haute-Corse, France
- Height: 1.75 m (5 ft 9 in)
- Position: Defender

Senior career*
Years	Team	Apps	(Gls)
1974–1981	Bastia	163	(2)
1981–1983	Nice		
1983–1989	Bastia		
- * Club domestic league appearances and goals

Paul Marchioni (born 1 January 1955) is a French former professional footballer who played as a defender.

He was part of SC Bastia team that reached 1978 UEFA Cup Final.
