= Jean-Marie De Zerbi =

French footballer (born 1959)

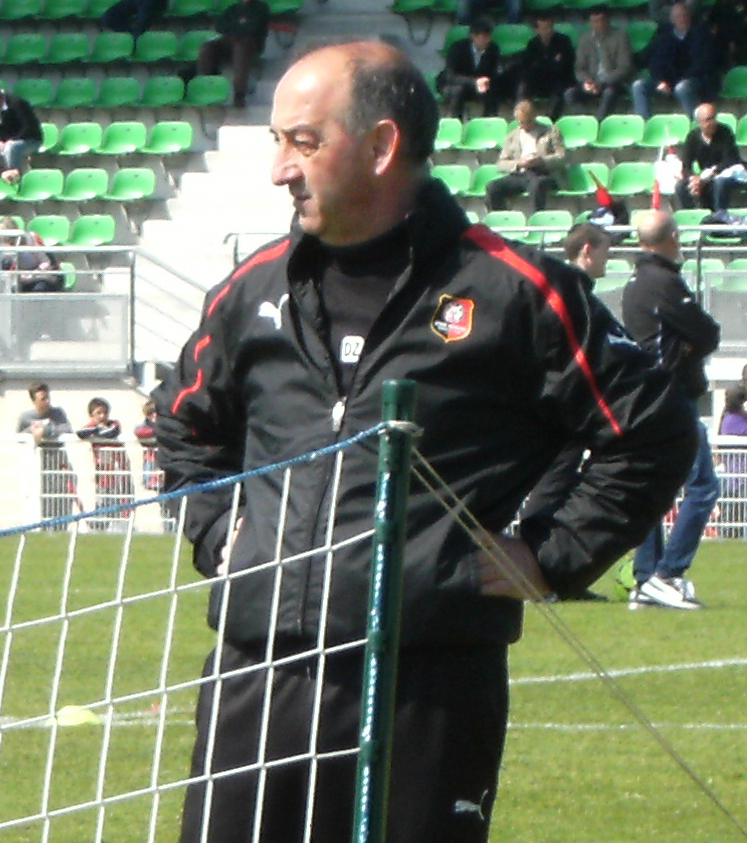
- De Zerbi during training at Rennes in 2013

Personal information
- Date of birth: 20 November 1959 (age 66)
- Place of birth: Bastia, France
- Height: 1.66 m (5 ft 5 in)
- Position: Striker

Youth career
- ASB Borgu

Senior career*
| Years | Team | Apps | (Gls) |
| 1977–1983 | Bastia | 89 | (9) |
| 1983–1984 | Tours | 10 | (0) |
| 1985–1986 | CS Meaux | | |

Managerial career
- 1992–1994: Bastia (director of sports)
- 1994–2001: Bastia (assistant)
- 2001–2004: Saint-Étienne (assistant)
- 2005–2009: Nice (assistant)
- 2009–2013: Rennes (assistant)
- 2015–2016: Lille (assistant)
- 2018–Jul 2020: Metz (assistant)
- Oct 2020–: Metz (assistant)
- * Club domestic league appearances and goals

Jean-Marie De Zerbi (born 20 November 1959) is a French former professional footballer who played as a striker. Since his retirement as a player he has worked as an assistant coach at various clubs, working with manager Frédéric Antonetti.

In 2018, when Frédéric Antonetti took time away from coaching duties at FC Metz, De Zerbi and Vincent Hognon took up head coaching duties at the team.

He was part of Bastia team that reached 1978 UEFA Cup Final. De Zerbi is recognized as the youngest French player to play in a UEFA Cup or Europa League final, when he appeared in the 1978 final against PSV Eindhoven aged 18 years and 5 months.
