= 1977–78 Eredivisie =

22nd season of the Eredivisie

Eredivisie
- Season: 1977–78
- Champions: PSV Eindhoven (7th title)
- Promoted: FC Volendam; Vitesse Arnhem
- Relegated: FC Amsterdam; Telstar
- European Cup: PSV Eindhoven
- Cup Winners' Cup: AZ '67
- UEFA Cup: AFC Ajax; FC Twente
- Goals: 899
- Average goals/game: 2.93
- Top goalscorer: (Netherlands) Ruud Geels; AFC Ajax 30 goals

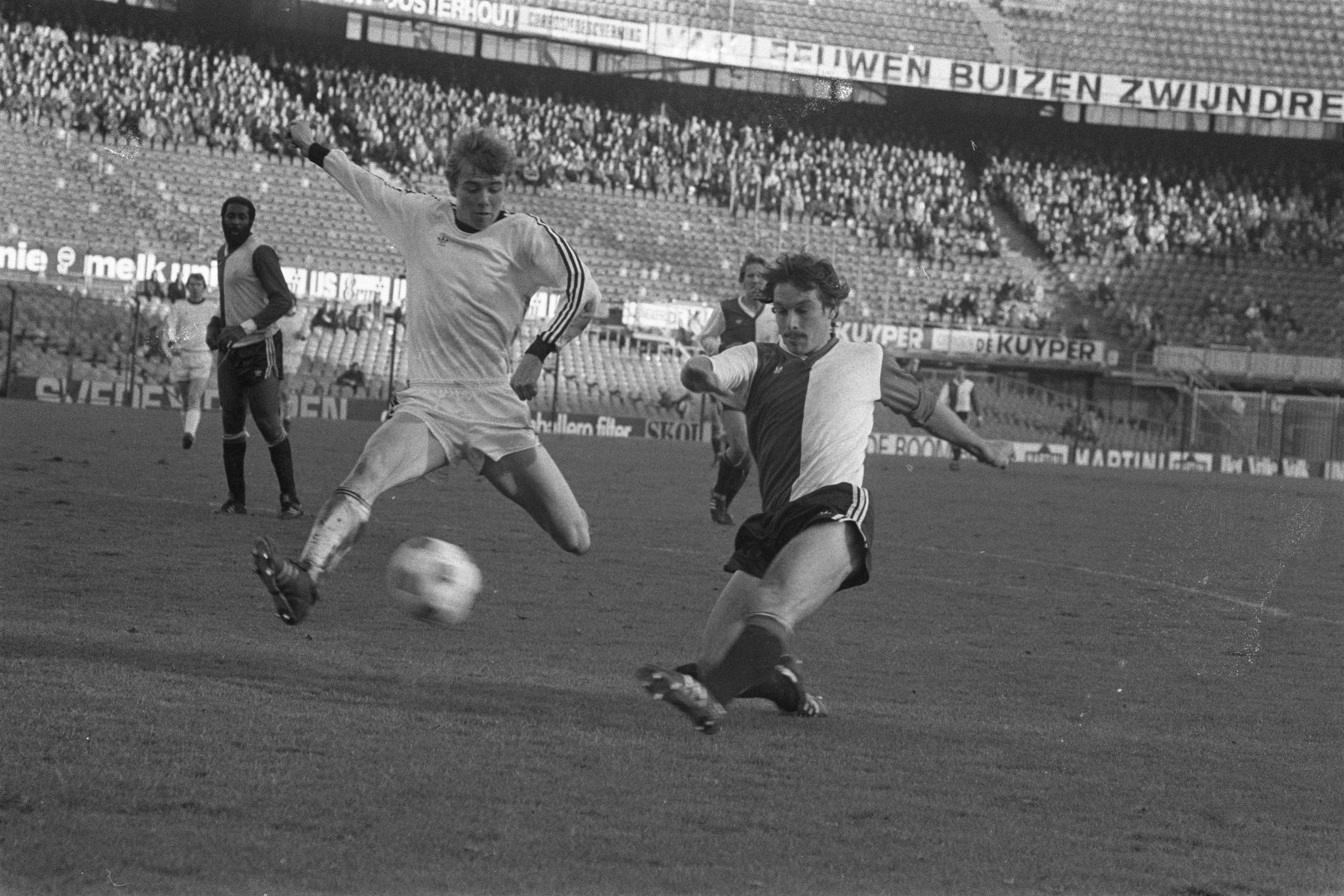
Feyenoord vs. Volendam (November 1977)

The Dutch Eredivisie in the 1977–78 season was contested by 18 teams. PSV won the championship and also won the UEFA Cup that season to complete a Double.

== League standings ==
Pos	Team	Pld	W	D	L	GF	GA	GD	Pts	Qualification or relegation
1	PSV Eindhoven	34	21	11	2	74	21	+53	53	Qualified for 1978–79 European Cup
2	AFC Ajax	34	20	9	5	85	36	+49	49	Qualified for 1978–79 UEFA Cup
3	AZ '67	34	19	9	6	75	30	+45	47	Qualified for 1978–79 European Cup Winners' Cup
4	FC Twente	34	18	9	7	61	32	+29	45	Qualified for 1978–79 UEFA Cup
5	Sparta Rotterdam	34	14	12	8	54	33	+21	40	
6	Roda JC	34	12	12	10	41	40	+1	36	
7	FC Volendam	34	13	8	13	50	58	−8	34	
8	FC Utrecht	34	11	11	12	40	45	−5	33	
9	Vitesse Arnhem	34	10	13	11	48	62	−14	33	
10	Feyenoord	34	10	12	12	52	47	+5	32	
11	NAC	34	10	11	13	37	51	−14	31	
12	FC Den Haag	34	11	6	17	45	57	−12	28	
13	HFC Haarlem	34	8	12	14	37	55	−18	28	
14	VVV-Venlo	34	9	10	15	46	66	−20	28	
15	NEC	34	10	8	16	39	59	−20	28	
16	Go Ahead Eagles	34	11	5	18	49	53	−4	27	
17	FC Amsterdam	34	9	8	17	41	73	−32	26	Relegated to Eerste Divisie
18	Telstar	34	3	8	23	25	81	−56	14	Relegated to Eerste Divisie

Source: rsssf.com

== Results ==
Home \ Away	AJA	AMS	AZ	FEY	GAE	DHA	HFC	NAC	NEC	PSV	RJC	SPA	TEL	TWE	UTR	VIT	VOL	VVV
Ajax		5–1	2–1	2–2	2–0	3–2	1–1	3–1	6–1	1–4	2–0	0–0	7–0	4–1	6–0	3–1	1–2	5–0
FC Amsterdam	1–3		2–9	1–2	4–4	0–0	3–2	2–0	0–3	0–7	1–2	2–1	2–1	1–3	1–1	1–1	0–1	3–0
AZ '67	1–0	0–0		4–2	2–1	2–0	6–0	1–0	3–0	1–1	1–1	1–2	4–0	4–1	4–1	4–0	1–1	4–1
Feyenoord	1–1	1–1	2–2		2–0	1–3	4–0	1–1	2–0	1–1	1–1	1–1	1–1	0–2	1–0	3–2	3–0	6–0
Go Ahead Eagles	1–0	2–0	2–0	2–1		3–2	1–2	1–2	2–3	1–4	1–2	1–2	5–1	0–1	2–1	4–0	1–0	2–1
FC Den Haag	0–3	3–1	1–0	2–1	2–1		2–1	1–2	1–2	1–3	3–1	1–1	3–0	0–0	1–1	1–1	5–2	1–2
Haarlem	0–2	0–2	0–3	2–0	0–0	2–0		0–0	6–0	1–0	0–0	3–2	1–1	1–1	1–0	2–2	2–3	2–1
NAC	0–0	3–2	1–2	2–1	2–1	1–0	2–1		2–1	0–2	0–1	0–0	2–2	2–0	4–1	1–1	3–3	0–2
N.E.C.	0–1	0–0	0–3	3–2	3–1	0–0	1–1	2–2		2–2	2–0	1–1	3–0	0–2	0–1	0–3	2–1	1–0
PSV	2–3	2–0	0–0	2–0	1–1	2–1	5–1	2–0	3–0		4–0	1–0	1–0	3–1	1–0	4–0	3–1	1–1
Roda JC	4–1	3–1	1–2	0–0	0–0	4–2	2–2	3–0	0–0	0–0		1–1	2–0	1–0	0–0	0–0	1–4	2–1
Sparta Rotterdam	1–1	6–0	2–1	2–3	4–0	2–0	3–1	1–0	3–0	0–0	1–0		2–2	1–2	2–3	4–1	1–0	2–1
Telstar	0–3	0–1	0–0	0–1	0–6	0–1	2–1	1–1	0–5	1–1	1–2	0–2		0–5	0–2	5–1	1–0	1–3
FC Twente '65	2–2	0–2	1–4	1–1	3–1	6–1	0–0	6–0	2–0	1–1	1–0	1–0	3–0		2–0	3–1	1–0	2–0
FC Utrecht	1–2	2–2	0–0	1–0	2–0	1–0	3–0	3–1	3–1	0–1	3–0	2–2	1–1	0–0		1–0	2–2	1–1
Vitesse	2–2	0–4	1–2	2–2	2–1	2–1	2–0	0–0	3–2	2–2	2–2	2–1	4–2	1–1	1–0		2–2	4–1
FC Volendam	1–6	3–0	2–1	1–0	1–0	1–3	1–1	3–1	2–0	0–4	3–0	0–0	2–0	0–5	3–3	1–1		2–0
FC VVV	2–2	3–0	2–2	4–3	1–1	5–1	0–0	1–1	1–1	0–4	0–5	1–1	3–2	1–1	3–0	0–1	4–2	

Source: rsssf.com
Legend: Blue = home team win; Yellow = draw; Red = away team win.

== Attendances ==
PSV drew the highest average home attendance in the Dutch top-flight football league.

#	Football club	Home games	Average attendance
1	PSV	17	22,824
2	Feyenoord	17	18,886
3	AZ '67	17	12,059
4	AFC Ajax	17	11,659
5	VVV	17	11,647
6	Roda JC	17	10,082
7	FC Twente	17	9,859
8	Vitesse	17	9,665
9	NEC	17	9,294
10	NAC	17	8,653
11	Sparta Rotterdam	17	8,647
12	Go Ahead Eagles	17	7,841
13	FC Den Haag	17	7,824
14	FC Volendam	17	7,147
15	FC Utrecht	17	7,118
16	HFC Haarlem	17	5,776
17	Telstar	17	4,307
18	FC Amsterdam	17	3,212

== See also ==
- 1977–78 Eerste Divisie
- 1977–78 KNVB Cup
