= List of SC Bastia managers =

Sporting Club de Bastia is a French professional football club based in Stade Armand Cesari, Bastia.

The club has won five major trophies, including the Ligue 2 twice, the Championnat National once, the Coupe de France once, the Trophée des Champions once and the UEFA Intertoto Cup once.

Since the beginning of the club's official managerial records in 1905 but by the 1957–58 season to present, Bastia have had 30 full-time managers.

The current manager of Bastia, is François Ciccolini.

== Statistics ==
Information correct as of match played 30 August 2015. Only competitive matches are counted.

Table headers

- Nationality – If the manager played international football as a player, the country/countries he played for are shown. Otherwise, the manager's nationality is given as their country of birth.
- From – The year of the manager's first game for Bastia.
- To – The year of the manager's last game for Bastia.
- P – The number of games managed for Bastia.
- W – The number of games won as a manager.
- D – The number of games draw as a manager.
- L – The number of games lost as a manager.
- GF – The number of goals scored under his management.
- GA – The number of goals conceded under his management.
- Win% – The total winning percentage under his management.
- Honours – The trophies won while managing Bastia.

Key

- (n/a) = Information not available

List of SC Bastia managers
Name	Nationality	From	To	P	W	D	L	GF	GA	Win% (Note: Win% is rounded to two decimal places)	Honours	Notes
Boumedienne Abderrahmane	Morocco	1957	1961	(n/a)	(n/a)	(n/a)	(n/a)	(n/a)	(n/a)	(n/a)		
François Fassone	France	1961	1963	(n/a)	(n/a)	(n/a)	(n/a)	(n/a)	(n/a)	(n/a)		
Gyula Nagy	Hungary	1963	1964	(n/a)	(n/a)	(n/a)	(n/a)	(n/a)	(n/a)	(n/a)		
André Strappe	France	1964	1965	(n/a)	(n/a)	(n/a)	(n/a)	(n/a)	(n/a)	(n/a)	Bastia promoted to Division 2 in 1965, and play to first professionally.	
Gyula Nagy	Hungary	1965	1966	36	18	9	9	60	46	50.00		
Lucien Jasseron	France	1966	1969	87	43	22	22	120	98	49.43	Champion in Division 2, and promoted to Division 1.	
Rachid Mekhloufi	France	1969	1970	54	23	5	26	83	102	42.59		
Edmond Delfour	France	1970	1970	13	4	2	7	16	28	30.77		
Gyula Nagy	Hungary	1 November 1970	30 November 1970	3	0	1	2	2	7	0.00		
Jean Vincent	France	1 December 1970	30 November 1971	42	16	6	20	57	78	38.10		
Pierre Cahuzac	France	1 December 1971	30 June 1979	348	158	73	117	555	448	45.40	Finalist in 1972 Coupe de France Final. Won Trophée des Champions in 1972. Finalist in 1978 UEFA Cup Final.	
Jean-Pierre Destrumelle	France	1 July 1979	30 June 1980	39	14	4	21	39	52	35.90		
Antoine Redin	France	1 July 1980	1 October 1985	242	85	59	98	270	348	35.12	Won 1981 Coupe de France Final.	
Alain Moizan	France	2 October 1985	1 February 1986	15	2	6	7	12	24	13.33		
Antoine Redin	France	2 February 1986	30 June 1986	13	1	2	10	11	34	7.69	Relegated to Division 2.	
Roland Gransart	France	1 July 1986	30 June 1991	183	79	43	61	263	233	43.17		
René Exbrayat	France	1 July 1991	30 June 1993	73	31	23	19	104	85	42.47		
Léonce Lavagne	France	1 July 1993	30 September 1994	55	26	13	16	60	49	47.27	Promoted to Division 1.	
Frédéric Antonetti	France	1 October 1994	30 June 1998	166	64	45	57	204	193	38.55	Finalist in 1995 Coupe de la Ligue Final; Champion in 1997 UEFA Intertoto Cup.	
Henryk Kasperczak	Poland	1 July 1998	1 October 1998	13	5	1	7	20	17	38.46		
Laurent Fournier	France	19 October 1998	21 April 1999	20	6	5	9	23	28	30.00		
José Pasqualetti	France	22 April 1999	30 June 1999	5	1	2	2	4	7	20.00		
Frédéric Antonetti	France	1 July 1999	31 May 2001	78	30	18	30	105	90	38.46		
Robert Nouzaret	France	2 July 2001	30 June 2002	45	19	6	20	54	53	42.22	Finalist in 2002 Coupe de France Final.	
Gérard Gili	France	1 July 2002	11 June 2004	81	22	23	36	75	106	27.16		
François Ciccolini	France	12 June 2004	13 April 2005	35	8	8	19	24	42	22.86		
Michel Padovani & Eric Durand (caretaker)	France & France	14 April 2005	30 June 2005	6	4	0	2	10	9	66.67	Relegated to Ligue 2.	p
Bernard Casoni	France	1 July 2005	30 June 2009	171	66	42	63	217	204	38.60		
Philippe Anziani	France	1 July 2009	25 November 2009	16	2	3	11	11	17	12.50		
Michel Padovani (caretaker)	France	26 November 2009	1 December 2009	1	0	1	0	1	1	0.00		
Faruk Hadzibegic	Bosnia and Herzegovina	9 December 2009	11 May 2010	20	7	5	8	24	27	35.00	Relegated to Championnat National.	
Frédéric Hantz	France	25 May 2010	22 May 2014	174	84	38	52	273	208	48.28	Champion in Championnat National, and promoted to Ligue 2. Champion in Ligue 2 and promoted to Ligue 1.	
Claude Makélélé	France	24 May 2014	3 November 2014	13	3	4	6	12	18	23.08		
Ghislain Printant	France	4 November 2014	28 January 2016	57	21	13	23	61	67	36.84	Finalist in 2015 Coupe de la Ligue Final	
François Ciccolini	France	28 January 2016	Present	1	1	0	0	1	0	100.00		
