= Derby de la Mediterranée =

Football classic in France

- Other names: Mediterranean Derby
- Location: Southern France
- Teams: Bastia; Nice
- First meeting: Nice 2–2 Bastia (3 September 1969); Division 1
- Latest meeting: Bastia 0–1 Nice (14 January 2025); Coupe de France
- Stadiums: Allianz Riviera (Nice); Armand-Cesari (Bastia)

Statistics
- Most wins: Bastia (23)
- Most player appearances: Charles Orlanducci (19)
- Top scorer: Nenad Bjeković (7)
- All-time series: Nice: 18; Bastia: 23; Draw: 17

The Derby de la Mediterranée (known as: Mediterranean Derby), refers to football match between Bastia and Nice, first contested in 1968. Bastia play at Stade Armand-Cesari in Furiani, Corsica, while Nice play at the Allianz Riviera in Nice, Provence-Alpes-Côte d'Azur. The teams have played 59 matches in all competitions; Bastia winning 23, Nice winning 17 and the remaining 19 have been drawn. The term Derby de la Mediterranée may also refer to matches between Nice and Olympique de Marseille.

== Head-to-head ==
First contested on 3 September 1968, when Nice hosted Nice, the match ended in a 2–2 draw. Bastia won its first derby match in the return fixture on 14 June 1969, in a 2–0 home victory, while Nice won its first debry in the next season on 22 August 1969 also a 2–0 home victory. A total of 59 derbies have been played, with 56 league matches and 3 cup matches (2 in Coupe de France and 1 in Coupe de la Ligue).

=== Statistics ===
As of 14 January 2025

Competition	Played	Bastia wins	Draws	Nice wins	Bastia goals	Nice goals
Ligue 1	50	19	14	17	68	63
Ligue 2	6	2	4	0	10	8
Coupe de France	2	1	1	1	3	3
Coupe de la Ligue	1	1	0	0	2	1
Total	59	23	19	18	83	75

=== List of matches ===
League

#	Season	Date	Competition	Home Team	Result	Away Team	Stadium	Attendance	H2H
1	1968–69	3 September 1968	French Division 1	Nice	2–2	Bastia	Stade du Ray	13,252	0
2	1968–69	14 June 1969	French Division 1	Bastia	2–0	Nice	Stade Armand-Cesari	2,800	+1
3	1970–71	22 August 1970	French Division 1	Nice	2–0	Bastia	Stade du Ray	8,381	0
4	1970–71	14 February 1971	French Division 1	Bastia	3–1	Nice	Stade Armand-Cesari	3,218	+1
5	1971–72	12 December 1971	French Division 1	Nice	0–1	Bastia	Stade du Ray	11,170	+2
6	1971–72	17 May 1972	French Division 1	Bastia	3–3	Nice	Stade Armand-Cesari	3,719	+2
7	1972–73	26 November 1972	French Division 1	Nice	1–0	Bastia	Stade du Ray	15,919	+1
8	1972–73	2 May 1973	French Division 1	Bastia	3–0	Nice	Stade Armand-Cesari	4,767	+2
9	1973–74	24 August 1973	French Division 1	Bastia	1–0	Nice	Stade Armand-Cesari	8,548	+3
10	1973–74	20 January 1974	French Division 1	Nice	3–0	Bastia	Stade du Ray	13,006	+2
11	1974–75	23 August 1974	French Division 1	Bastia	2–0	Nice	Stade Armand-Cesari	7,495	+3
12	1974–75	12 January 1975	French Division 1	Nice	2–1	Bastia	Stade du Ray	13,876	+2
13	1975–76	30 September 1975	French Division 1	Bastia	1–1	Nice	Stade Armand-Cesari	8,436	+2
14	1975–76	25 January 1976	French Division 1	Nice	1–1	Bastia	Stade du Ray	11,615	+2
15	1976–77	18 December 1976	French Division 1	Nice	5–0	Bastia	Stade du Ray	16,649	+1
16	1976–77	4 June 1977	French Division 1	Bastia	2–0	Nice	Stade Armand-Cesari	5,754	+2
17	1977–78	19 November 1977	French Division 1	Nice	3–1	Bastia	Stade du Ray	14,694	+1
18	1977–78	21 April 1978	French Division 1	Bastia	4–1	Nice	Stade Armand-Cesari	3,014	+2
19	1978–79	2 August 1978	French Division 1	Bastia	5–2	Nice	Stade Armand-Cesari	9,500	+3
20	1978–79	2 December 1978	French Division 1	Nice	2–2	Bastia	Stade du Ray	8,291	+3
21	1979–80	28 August 1979	French Division 1	Nice	2–1	Bastia	Stade du Ray	9,217	+2
22	1979–80	2 February 1980	French Division 1	Bastia	3–0	Nice	Stade Armand-Cesari	2,000	+3
23	1980–81	14 August 1980	French Division 1	Nice	2–1	Bastia	Stade du Ray	5,519	+2
24	1980–81	15 April 1981	French Division 1	Bastia	3–0	Nice	Stade Armand-Cesari	3,852	+3
25	1981–82	28 August 1981	French Division 1	Bastia	1–1	Nice	Stade Armand-Cesari	9,000	+3
26	1981–82	30 January 1982	French Division 1	Nice	1–1	Bastia	Stade du Ray	4,240	+3
27	1985–86	25 October 1985	French Division 1	Nice	0–1	Bastia	Stade du Ray	10,269	+2
28	1985–86	4 April 1986	French Division 1	Bastia	1–0	Nice	Stade Armand-Cesari	1,000	+1
29	1991–92	7 September 1991	French Division 2	Bastia	2–1	Nice	Stade Armand-Cesari	–	+2
30	1991–92	1 February 1992	French Division 2	Nice	1–2	Bastia	Stade du Ray	–	+3
31	1992–93	28 August 1992	French Division 2	Nice	4–4	Bastia	Stade du Ray	–	+3
32	1992–93	17 January 1993	French Division 2	Bastia	0–0	Nice	Stade Armand-Cesari	–	+3
33	1993–94	1 September 1993	French Division 2	Nice	2–2	Bastia	Stade du Ray	6,387	+3
34	1993–94	19 February 1994	French Division 2	Bastia	0–0	Nice	Stade Armand-Cesari	3,500	+3
35	1994–95	10 September 1994	French Division 1	Nice	1–2	Bastia	Stade du Ray	9,102	+4
36	1994–95	11 February 1995	French Division 1	Bastia	1–1	Nice	Stade Armand-Cesari	8,000	+4
37	1995–96	25 November 1995	French Division 1	Nice	3–1	Bastia	Stade du Ray	–	+3
38	1995–96	11 May 1996	French Division 1	Bastia	1–2	Nice	Stade Armand-Cesari	–	+2
39	1996–97	24 August 1996	French Division 1	Nice	1–1	Bastia	Stade du Ray	6,500	+2
40	1996–97	7 December 1996	French Division 1	Bastia	1–0	Nice	Stade Armand-Cesari	3,500	+3
41	2002–03	5 October 2002	Ligue 1	Nice	2–0	Bastia	Stade du Ray	13,060	+2
42	2002–03	22 February 2003	Ligue 1	Bastia	1–1	Nice	Stade Armand-Cesari	9,165	+2
43	2003–04	5 October 2002	Ligue 1	Nice	2–0	Bastia	Stade du Ray	10,000	+1
44	2003–04	3 April 2004	Ligue 1	Bastia	2–1	Nice	Stade Armand-Cesari	5,751	+2
45	2004–05	27 August 2004	Ligue 1	Nice	1–1	Bastia	Stade du Ray	9,649	+2
46	2004–05	22 January 2005	Ligue 1	Bastia	2–0	Nice	Stade Armand-Cesari	4,135	+3
47	2012–13	29 September 2012	Ligue 1	Nice	2–2	Bastia	Stade du Ray	9,114	+3
48	2012–13	16 February 2013	Ligue 1	Bastia	0–1	Nice	Stade Armand-Cesari	14,551	+2
49	2013–14	26 October 2013	Ligue 1	Bastia	1–0	Nice	Stade Armand-Cesari	14,067	+3
50	2013–14	15 March 2014	Ligue 1	Nice	2–0	Bastia	Stade du Ray	24,337	+2
51	2014–15	18 October 2014	Ligue 1	Nice	0–1	Bastia	Stade du Ray	18,919	+3
52	2014–15	7 March 2015	Ligue 1	Bastia	2–1	Nice	Stade Armand-Cesari	13,777	+4
53	2015–16	19 September 2015	Ligue 1	Bastia	1–3	Nice	Stade Armand-Cesari	12,945	+3
54	2015–16	26 February 2016	Ligue 1	Nice	0–2	Bastia	Stade du Ray	14,541	+4
55	2016–17	17 November 2016	Ligue 1	Nice	1–1	Bastia	Stade du Ray	20,856	+4
56	2016–17	20 January 2017	Ligue 1	Bastia	1–1	Nice	Stade Armand-Cesari	9,757	+4

Cup

#	Season	Date	Competition	Round	Home Team	Result	Away Team	Stadium	Attendance
1	1991–92	8 April 1992	Coupe de France	Round of 16	Nice	0–1	Bastia	Stade du Ray	11,174
2	1996–97	7 February 1997	Coupe de France	Round of 32	Bastia	2–2 (Note: Nice won 4–3 on penalties.)	Nice	Stade Armand-Cesari	6,000
3	2000–01	7 January 2001	Coupe de la Ligue	Second round	Bastia	2–1	Nice	Stade Armand-Cesari	3,754
4	2024–25	14 February 2025	Coupe de France	Round of 32	Bastia	0–1	Nice	Stade Armand-Cesari	9,299

== Records ==
=== All-time top goalscorers ===
As of 20 January 2017

Rank	Nation	Player	Club(s)	Years	League	Coupe de France	Coupe de la Ligue	Overall
1	(Socialist Federal Republic of Yugoslavia)	Nenad Bjeković	Nice	1976–1981	7	0	0	7
2	(Liberia)	James Debbah	Nice	1995–1997	5	0	0	5
3	(France)	Daniel Sanchez	Nice	1972–1981	4	0	0	4
3	(Montenegro)	Anto Drobnjak	Bastia	1994–1987	4	0	0	4
5	(France)	Marc-Kanyan Case	Bastia	1969–1973	3	0	0	3
5	(Sweden)	Leif Eriksson	Bastia	1970–1975	3	0	0	3
5	(France)	François Félix	Bastia	1971–1973	3	0	0	3
5	(France)	Claude Papi	Bastia	1967–1982	3	0	0	3
5	(France)	Serge Lenoir	Bastia	1972–1976	3	0	0	3
5	(Morocco)	Abdelkrim Merry	Bastia	1974–1980	3	0	0	3
5	(Netherlands)	Johnny Rep	Bastia	1977–1979	3	0	0	3
5	(France)	Christophe Meslin	Nice	2001–2002, 2002–2003, 2003–2005	3	0	0	3
5	(France)	Christophe Meslin	Bastia	2005–2007	0	0	0	3

=== All-time most appearances ===
As of 20 January 2017

Rank	Nation	Player	Club(s)	Years	League	Coupe de France	Coupe de la Ligue	Overall
1	(France)	Charles Orlanducci	Bastia	1969–1987	19	0	0	19
2	(France)	Claude Papi	Bastia	1967–1982	17	0	0	17
3	(France)	Roger Jouve	Bastia	1965–1978	13	0	0	13
3	(France)	Dominique Baratelli	Nice	1971–1978	13	0	0	13
5	(France)	Jean-Louis Cazes	Bastia	1975–1984	12	0	0	12
6	(France)	Daniel Sanchez	Nice	1971–1981	11	0	0	11
6	(France)	André Burkhard	Nice	1973–1980	11	0	0	11
6	(France)	Francis Isnard	Nice	1963–1975	11	0	0	11
6	(France)	Georges Franceschetti	Bastia	1968–1972, 1974–1978	11	0	0	11
6	(Uruguay)	Juan Pedro Ascery	Nice	1972–1981	11	0	0	11
6	(France)	Bruno Valencony	Bastia	1987–1996	6	1	0	11
6	(France)	Bruno Valencony	Nice	1996–2005	2	1	1	11

=== Hat-tricks ===
Nation	Player	For	Against	Score	Competition	Date	Ref.
(Socialist Federal Republic of Yugoslavia)	Nenad Bjeković	Nice	Bastia	3–1 (H)	1977–78 French Division 1	19 November 1977	

=== Discipline ===
Rank	Nation	Player	Red card(s)	For	Against	Competition	Date	Ref.
1	(France)	Yannick Cahuzac	2	Bastia	Nice	2013–14 Ligue 1	15 March 2014	
1	(France)	Yannick Cahuzac	2	Bastia	Nice	2016–17 Ligue 1	20 January 2017	
2	(Belgium)	Gianni Bruno	1	Bastia	Nice	2013–14 Ligue 1	26 October 2013	
2	(France)	Grégoire Puel	1	Nice	Bastia	2014–15 Ligue 1	7 March 2015	
2	(France)	Hervé Revelli	1	Nice	Bastia	1973–74 French Division 1	26 November 1973	
2	(Socialist Federal Republic of Yugoslavia)	Ilija Pantelić	1	Bastia	Nice	1973–74 French Division 1	26 November 1973	
2	(France)	Jean-Louis Cazes	1	Bastia	Nice	1976–77 French Division 1	18 December 1976	
2	(Mali)	Mahamane Traoré	1	Nice	Bastia	2013–14 Ligue 1	26 October 2013	
2	(France)	Paul Baysse	1	Bastia	Nice	2015–16 Ligue 1	26 February 2016	
2	(Senegal)	Souleymane Diawara	1	Nice	Bastia	2014–15 Ligue 1	07 March 2015	

=== Results ===
==== Biggest wins (5+ goals) ====
Winning margin	Result	Date	Competition
5	Nice 5–0 Bastia	18 December 1976	1976–77 French Division 1

==== Most total goals in a match ====
Goals	Result	Date	Competition
8	Nice 4–4 Bastia	28 August 1992	1992–93 French Division 1
7	Bastia 5–2 Nice	2 August 1978	1978–79 French Division 1
6	Bastia 3–3 Nice	17 May 1972	1971–72 French Division 1

==== Longest runs ====
===== Most consecutive wins =====
Games	Club	Period
3	Bastia	7 September 1991 – 8 April 1992

===== Most consecutive draws =====
Games	Period
4	28 August 1992 – 19 February 1994

===== Most consecutive matches without a draw =====
Games	Period
7	16 February 2013 – 26 February 2016
6	26 November 1972 – 12 January 1975
5	18 December 1976 – 2 August 1978
5	25 October 1985 – 8 April 1992

===== Longest undefeated runs =====
Games	Club	Period
9	Bastia	7 September 1991 – 11 February 1995
4	Bastia	3 April 2004 – 29 September 2012

===== Most consecutive games scoring =====
Games	Club	Period
8	Bastia	10 September 1994 – 7 January 2001
7	Nice	7 February 1997 – 27 August 2004
6	Bastia	2 February 1980 – 25 October 1985
6	Nice	28 August 1981 – 1 February 1992
5	Nice	19 November 1977 – 28 August 1979
5	Bastia	22 February 2003 – 29 September 2012
