= 2013–14 Ligue 1 =

76th season of top-tier French football

Ligue 1
- Season: 2013–14
- Dates: 9 August 2013 – 17 May 2014
- Champions: Paris Saint-Germain; 4th Ligue 1 title 4th French title
- Relegated: Valenciennes; Ajaccio; Sochaux
- Champions League: Paris Saint-Germain; Monaco; Lille
- Europa League: Guingamp; Saint-Étienne; Lyon
- Matches: 380
- Goals: 931 (2.45 per match)
- Top goalscorer: Zlatan Ibrahimović (26 goals)
- Biggest home win: Paris Saint-Germain 5–0 Sochaux (7 December 2013); Paris Saint-Germain 5–0 Nantes (19 January 2014)
- Biggest away win: Toulouse 0–5 Rennes (26 October 2013)
- Highest scoring: Valenciennes 2–6 Nantes (20 April 2014); Lorient 4–4 Montpellier (20 April 2014)
- Longest winning run: 8 games Paris Saint-Germain (14 February – 5 April)
- Longest unbeaten run: 16 games Paris Saint-Germain (7 December – 5 April)
- Longest winless run: 16 games Ajaccio (29 September – 1 February)
- Longest losing run: 7 games Nice (26 October – 7 December); Valenciennes (17 August - 28 September and 6 April - 17 May)
- Highest attendance: 48,960; Lille 1-3 Paris Saint-Germain (10 May 2014)
- Lowest attendance: 5,534; Ajaccio 2-1 Reims (10 May 2014)
- Average attendance: 21,155

The 2013–14 Ligue 1 was the 76th season since its establishment. The season began on 9 August 2013 and ended on 17 May 2014. Paris Saint-Germain were the defending champions. As in the previous years, Adidas provided the official ball for all matches, with a new Adidas Pro Ligue 1 model to be used throughout the season for all matches.

On 7 May, Paris Saint-Germain won their second straight Ligue 1 title just before losing 2–1 to Rennes. The title was secured before PSG kicked off when Monaco drew 1–1 against Guingamp.

== Teams ==
There are three promoted teams from Ligue 2, replacing the three teams that were relegated from Ligue 1 following the 2012–13 season. A total of 20 teams currently compete in the league with three clubs suffering relegation to the second division, Ligue 2. All clubs that secured Ligue 1 status for the season were subject to approval by the DNCG before becoming eligible to participate.

Brest was the first team relegated after a 2–0 home defeat to Sochaux on 11 May 2013 after 3 years in the top flight. Nancy followed one week later after a 2–1 home defeat to Bastia on 18 May 2013 ending 8 years of top-flight tenure. Finally Troyes were relegated from the top level after a 2–1 away defeat to Valenciennes on 26 May 2013.

These relegated team were replaced by Ligue 2 champions Monaco, runners-up Guingamp, and third-placed Nantes. Monaco clinched the second division title on 11 May 2013 with two matches to spare after defeating Nîmes 1–0 at away. Monaco made its return to the first division after a two-year absence.

Guingamp and Nantes became the second and third clubs, respectively, to earn promotion to Ligue 1 alongside the champion Monaco. Both clubs achieved promotion with one game to spare following league victories on 17 May 2013. Guingamp returned to the first division after nine years. During its nine-year spell outside the first division, Guingamp also played in Championnat National in the 2010–11 season. Finally, Nantes, eight-time league champions, returned to top level after a four-year absence.

=== Stadia and locations ===
Location of teams in 2013–14 Ligue 1

Club	Location	Venue	Capacity	Av. Att.
Ajaccio	Ajaccio	Stade François Coty	10,660	6,297
Bastia	Bastia	Stade Armand Cesari	16,480	13,647
Bordeaux	Bordeaux	Stade Chaban-Delmas	34,462	18,833
Evian	Annecy	Parc des Sports	15,660	10,919
Guingamp	Guingamp	Stade du Roudourou	18,126	15,001
Lille	Villeneuve-d'Ascq	Stade Pierre-Mauroy	50,186	38,662
Lorient	Lorient	Stade du Moustoir	18,890	15,160
Lyon	Lyon	Stade de Gerland	41,842	34,414
Marseille	Marseille	Stade Vélodrome^{1}	48,000	38,662
Monaco	Monaco	Stade Louis II	18,500	8,906
Montpellier	Montpellier	Stade de la Mosson	32,939	14,679
Nantes	Nantes	Stade de la Beaujoire	38,285	28,169
Nice	Nice	Allianz Riviera	35,624	24,186
Paris Saint-Germain	Paris	Parc des Princes	48,712	45,420
Reims	Reims	Stade Auguste Delaune	21,684	15,558
Rennes	Rennes	Stade de la Route de Lorient	31,127	19,523
Saint-Étienne	Saint-Étienne	Stade Geoffroy-Guichard^{2}	37,384	30,595
Sochaux	Montbéliard	Stade Auguste Bonal	20,005	14,388
Toulouse	Toulouse	Stadium Municipal^{3}	24,092	14,994
Valenciennes	Valenciennes	Stade du Hainaut	25,172	14,354

- ^{1}The Stade Vélodrome is currently undergoing renovation in preparation for UEFA Euro 2016. The current capacity is 48,000, a decrease from the original capacity of 60,031. The capacity will be slightly extended in December 2013 following the completion of a new stand.
- ^{2}The Stade Geoffroy-Guichard is currently undergoing renovation in preparation for UEFA Euro 2016. The current capacity is 26,747, a decrease from the original capacity of 35,616. The capacity will be slightly extended in August 2013 following the completion of a new stand.
- ^{3}The Stadium Municipal is currently undergoing renovation in preparation for UEFA Euro 2016. The current capacity is not published yet but is a decrease from the original capacity of 35,470.

=== Personnel and kits ===
Note: Flags indicate national team as has been defined under FIFA eligibility rules. Players and managers may hold more than one non-FIFA nationality.

Team	Manager^{1}	Captain^{1}	Kit manufacturer^{1}	Shirt sponsors (front)^{1}	Shirt sponsors (back)	Shirt sponsors (sleeve)	Shorts sponsors
Ajaccio	(France) Christian Bracconi	(France) Johan Cavalli	Macron	Corse du Sud, Collectivité Territoriale de Corse, Rocca Transports	Europcar	Géant Casino	None
Bastia	(France) Frédéric Hantz	(France) Yannick Cahuzac	Kappa	Oscaro, Invicta, Collectivité Territoriale de Corse, Corsica Ferries, Playzzer	None	Technitoit, Haute-Corse	Hyundai Bastia, Kaporal
Bordeaux	(France) Francis Gillot	(France) Cédric Carrasso	Puma	Kia	Groupama	None	None
Evian	(France) Pascal Dupraz	(France) Olivier Sorlin	Kappa	Evian, Pilot, Geodis Calberson, Bontaz Centre	Samsic	SAT Autocars	VEKA
Guingamp	(France) Jocelyn Gourvennec	(France) Lionel Mathis	Patrick	Celtigel, Geodis Calberson, Breizh Cola	Mère Lalie	Celtarmor	BRIEUC biscuiterie, caramelerie, confiturerie
Lille	(France) René Girard	(France) Rio Mavuba	Nike	Partouche, Playzer	Partouche	None	None
Lorient	(France) Christian Gourcuff	(Gabon) Bruno Ecuele Manga	Macron	La Trinitaine (H)/Armor-Lux (A), Armor-Lux(H)/La Trinitaine(A), B&B Hotels	Salaün Holidays	None	Lorient Agglomération
Lyon	(France) Rémi Garde	(France) Maxime Gonalons	Adidas	Hyundai (H & A)/Veolia (T, in UEFA and league cup matches), Cegid, MDA Electroménager	None	Intermarché	Oknoplast
Marseille	(France) José Anigo	(France) Steve Mandanda	Adidas	Intersport	Turkish Airlines	Mutuelles du Soleil	Quick
Monaco	(Italy) Claudio Ranieri	(France) Eric Abidal	Macron	Fedcom, Fight Aids Monaco	None	Triangle Intérim	None
Montpellier	(France) Rolland Courbis	(Brazil) Hilton	Nike	Sud de France, Dyneff Gaz, Montpellier Métropole, NetBet	laRégion.fr	FAUN-Environnement	Système U, Wati B
Nantes	(Armenia) Michel Der Zakarian	(France) Olivier Veigneau	Erreà	Synergie, Treignac Eau Minérale Naturelle, Système U	Anvolia	None	11 Football Club
Nice	(France) Claude Puel	(France) Didier Digard	Burrda	Mutuelles du Soleil, Métropole Nice Côte d'Azur, Playzer	Pizzorno Environnement	Rémanence	Ville de Nice
Paris Saint-Germain	(France) Laurent Blanc	(Brazil) Thiago Silva	Nike	Fly Emirates	Ooredoo	QNB	None
Reims	(France) Hubert Fournier	(France) Mickaël Tacalfred	Hummel	Sanei Ascenseurs, Geodis Calberson, Transports Caillot	Epsilon Global	Reims Métropole (H)/Reims (A)	None
Rennes	(France) Philippe Montanier	(France) Romain Danzé	Puma	Samsic, Del Arte, rennes.fr	Blot Immobilier	Association ELA	Breizh Cola
Saint-Étienne	(France) Christophe Galtier	(France) Loïc Perrin	Adidas	Winamax, Conseil départemental de la Loire	Mister Auto	MARKAL	Loire, Saint-Étienne Métropole, Rapid CroQ'
Sochaux	(France) Hervé Renard	(Mali) Cédric Kanté	Lotto	Peugeot, Franche-Comté, Mobil 1	Pays de Montbéliard Agglomération	None	Mabéo
Toulouse	(France) Alain Casanova	(France) Jonathan Zebina	Kappa	Triangle Intérim, JD Patrimoine, JD Promotion	Newrest	None	So Toulouse
Valenciennes	(Belgium) Ariël Jacobs	(France) Nicolas Penneteau	Uhlsport	Guy Dauphin Environnement (H)/Prévoir Assurances (A), Toyota, Partouche	Prévoir Assurances (H)/Guy Dauphin Environnement (A)	None	Buromatic 59, OCAD

^{1}Subject to change before the start of the season.

=== Managerial changes ===
Team	Outgoing head coach	Manner of departure	Date of vacancy	Position in table	Incoming head coach	Date of appointment	Position in table
Montpellier	(France) René Girard	Mutual consent	30 May 2013	Off-season	(France) Jean Fernandez	1 July 2013	Off-season
Rennes	(France) Frédéric Antonetti	Resigned	30 May 2013	Off-season	(France) Philippe Montanier	1 July 2013	Off-season
Ajaccio	(France) Albert Emon	Resigned	30 May 2013	Off-season	(Italy) Fabrizio Ravanelli	8 June 2013	Off-season
Lille	(France) Rudi Garcia	Mutual consent	3 June 2013	Off-season	(France) René Girard	14 June 2013	Off-season
Paris Saint-Germain	(Italy) Carlo Ancelotti	Signed by Real Madrid	25 June 2013	Off-season	(France) Laurent Blanc	25 June 2013	Off-season
Sochaux	(France) Eric Hély	Resigned	26 September 2013	20th	(Senegal) Omar Daf	27 September 2013	20th
Sochaux	(Senegal) Omar Daf	End of caretaker spell	7 October 2013	19th	(France) Hervé Renard	7 October 2013	19th
Valenciennes	(France) Daniel Sanchez	Sacked	7 October 2013	20th	(Belgium) Ariël Jacobs	14 October 2013	20th
Ajaccio	(Italy) Fabrizio Ravanelli	Sacked	2 November 2013	19th	(France) Christian Bracconi	4 November 2013	19th
Montpellier	(France) Jean Fernandez	Resigned	5 December 2013	17th	(France) Rolland Courbis	9 December 2013	17th
Marseille	(France) Elie Baup	Sacked	7 December 2013	5th	(France) José Anigo	7 December 2013	5th

== League table ==
Pos	Team	Pld	W	D	L	GF	GA	GD	Pts	Qualification or relegation
1	Paris Saint-Germain (C)	38	27	8	3	84	23	+61	89	Qualification for the Champions League group stage (Note: Paris Saint-Germain qualified for the Europa League third qualifying round by winning the 2013–14 Coupe de la Ligue. However, since they already qualified for European competition based on their league position, the spots awarded to the cup winners were passed down the league.)
2	Monaco (Note: Monaco were deducted 2 points due to poor fan behavior in a match last season. However this was overturned on 13 August 2013.)	38	23	11	4	63	31	+32	80	Qualification for the Champions League group stage
3	Lille	38	20	11	7	46	26	+20	71	Qualification for the Champions League third qualifying round
4	Saint-Étienne	38	20	9	9	56	34	+22	69	Qualification for the Europa League play-off round
5	Lyon	38	17	10	11	56	44	+12	61	Qualification for the Europa League third qualifying round
6	Marseille	38	16	12	10	53	40	+13	60	
7	Bordeaux	38	13	14	11	49	43	+6	53	
8	Lorient	38	13	10	15	48	53	−5	49	
9	Toulouse	38	12	13	13	46	53	−7	49	
10	Bastia	38	13	10	15	42	56	−14	49	
11	Reims	38	12	12	14	44	52	−8	48	
12	Rennes	38	11	13	14	47	45	+2	46	
13	Nantes	38	12	10	16	38	43	−5	46	
14	Evian	38	11	11	16	39	51	−12	44	
15	Montpellier	38	8	18	12	45	53	−8	42	
16	Guingamp	38	11	9	18	34	42	−8	42	Qualification for the Europa League group stage
17	Nice	38	12	6	20	30	44	−14	42	
18	Sochaux (R)	38	10	10	18	37	61	−24	40	Relegation to Ligue 2
19	Valenciennes (R)	38	7	8	23	37	65	−28	29	Relegation to Ligue 2
20	Ajaccio (R)	38	4	11	23	37	72	−35	23	Relegation to Ligue 2

Source: Ligue 1
Rules for classification: 1) Points; 2) Goal difference; 3) Number of goals scored
(C) Champions; (R) Relegated

== Results ==
Home \ Away	ACA	BAS	BOR	EVI	GUI	LIL	LOR	OL	OM	ASM	MHS	NAN	NIC	PSG	REI	REN	STE	SOC	TFC	VAL
Ajaccio		1–1	1–1	2–3	1–2	2–3	1–2	2–1	1–3	1–4	1–1	0–1	0–0	1–2	2–1	3–1	0–1	1–1	2–2	1–3
Bastia	2–1		1–0	2–0	3–2	1–1	4–1	1–3	0–0	0–2	0–0	0–0	1–0	0–3	2–0	1–0	0–2	2–2	2–1	2–0
Bordeaux	4–0	1–0		2–1	5–1	1–0	3–2	1–2	1–1	0–2	2–0	0–3	1–1	0–2	0–0	2–2	2–0	4–1	0–1	2–1
Evian	1–1	2–1	1–1		1–2	2–2	0–4	2–1	1–2	1–0	2–2	2–0	2–0	2–0	1–1	1–2	1–2	1–1	2–1	0–1
Guingamp	2–1	1–1	0–1	0–1		0–0	2–0	0–1	1–3	0–2	1–2	1–0	1–0	1–1	1–2	2–0	0–0	5–1	2–0	1–0
Lille	3–0	2–1	2–1	3–0	1–0		1–0	0–0	1–0	2–0	2–0	0–0	0–2	1–3	1–2	1–1	1–0	2–0	1–0	1–0
Lorient	1–0	1–1	3–3	1–1	2–0	1–4		2–2	0–2	2–2	4–4	2–1	3–0	0–1	0–0	2–0	1–0	2–1	1–3	1–0
Lyon	3–1	4–1	1–1	3–0	2–0	0–0	0–1		2–2	2–3	0–0	3–1	4–0	1–0	0–1	0–0	1–2	2–0	1–1	1–1
Marseille	3–1	3–0	2–2	2–0	1–0	0–0	1–0	4–2		1–2	2–0	0–1	0–1	1–2	2–3	0–1	2–1	2–1	2–2	2–1
Monaco	1–0	3–0	1–1	1–1	1–1	1–1	1–0	2–1	2–0		4–1	3–1	1–0	1–1	3–2	2–0	2–1	2–1	0–0	1–2
Montpellier	2–0	0–2	1–1	1–1	1–1	0–1	0–2	5–1	2–3	1–1		1–1	3–1	1–1	0–0	0–0	0–1	2–1	2–1	0–0
Nantes	2–2	2–0	0–0	3–0	1–0	0–1	1–0	1–2	1–1	0–1	2–1		2–0	1–2	0–0	0–3	1–3	1–0	1–2	2–1
Nice	2–0	2–0	1–2	3–1	1–0	1–0	1–2	0–1	1–0	0–3	2–2	0–0		0–1	1–0	2–1	0–1	1–0	0–2	4–0
Paris SG	1–1	4–0	2–0	1–0	2–0	2–2	4–0	4–0	2–0	1–1	4–0	5–0	3–1		3–0	1–2	2–0	5–0	2–0	3–0
Reims	4–1	4–2	1–0	1–0	1–1	2–1	1–1	0–2	1–1	1–1	2–4	0–0	1–0	0–3		1–3	2–2	0–1	1–2	3–1
Rennes	2–0	3–0	1–1	0–0	0–2	0–0	1–1	2–0	1–1	0–1	2–2	1–3	0–0	1–3	2–1		3–1	1–2	2–3	2–2
Saint-Étienne	3–1	2–2	2–1	1–0	1–0	2–0	3–2	1–2	1–1	2–0	2–0	2–0	1–1	2–2	4–0	0–0		3–1	1–2	3–0
Sochaux	0–0	1–1	2–0	0–3	1–0	0–2	2–0	1–3	1–1	2–2	0–2	1–0	2–0	1–1	0–2	2–1	0–0		2–0	2–0
Toulouse	1–1	1–3	1–1	1–1	0–0	1–2	1–0	0–0	1–1	0–2	1–1	1–1	1–0	2–4	3–2	0–5	0–0	5–1		3–1
Valenciennes	2–3	3–2	0–1	0–1	1–1	0–1	1–1	1–2	0–1	1–2	1–1	2–6	2–1	0–1	1–1	2–1	1–3	2–2	3–0	

Source: Ligue 1
Legend: Blue = home team win; Yellow = draw; Red = away team win.

== Statistics ==
=== Top goalscorers ===
Rank	Player	Club	Goals
1	(Sweden) Zlatan Ibrahimović	Paris Saint-Germain	26
2	(Cameroon) Vincent Aboubakar	Lorient	16
2	(France) Wissam Ben Yedder	Toulouse	16
2	(Uruguay) Edinson Cavani	Paris Saint-Germain	16
2	(France) André-Pierre Gignac	Marseille	16
2	(Ivory Coast) Salomon Kalou	Lille	16
7	(France) Alexandre Lacazette	Lyon	15
8	(France) Rémy Cabella	Montpellier	14
8	(France) Bafétimbi Gomis	Lyon	14
10	(Mali) Cheick Diabaté	Bordeaux	12
10	(Turkey) Mevlüt Erdinç	Saint-Étienne	12

Source: Official Goalscorers' Standings

=== Hat-tricks ===
Player	Club	Against	Result	Date
(France) Emmanuel Rivière	Monaco	Montpellier	4–1	18 August 2013
(Sweden) Zlatan Ibrahimović	Paris Saint-Germain	Nice	3–1	9 November 2013
(France) Wissam Ben Yedder	Toulouse	Sochaux	5–1	30 November 2013
(Sweden) Zlatan Ibrahimović	Paris Saint-Germain	Toulouse	2–4	23 February 2014
(Ivory Coast) Salomon Kalou	Lille	Ajaccio	2–3	2 March 2014
(Ghana) André Ayew	Marseille	Ajaccio	3–1	4 April 2014
(Mali) Cheick Diabaté	Bordeaux	Guingamp	5–1	20 April 2014

== Awards ==
Award	Winner	Club
Player of the Season	(Sweden) Zlatan Ibrahimović	Paris Saint-Germain
Young Player of the Season	(Italy) Marco Verratti	Paris Saint-Germain
Goalkeeper of the Season	(Italy) Salvatore Sirigu	Paris Saint-Germain
Goal of the Season	(Sweden) Zlatan Ibrahimović	Paris Saint-Germain
Manager of the Season	(France) René Girard	Lille

Team of the Year
Goalkeeper	(Italy) Salvatore Sirigu (Paris Saint-Germain)			
Defence	(Ivory Coast) Serge Aurier (Toulouse)	(Brazil) Thiago Silva (Paris Saint-Germain)	(France) Loïc Perrin (Saint-Étienne)	(France) Layvin Kurzawa (Monaco)
Midfield	(France) Alexandre Lacazette (Lyon)	(Italy) Marco Verratti (Paris Saint-Germain)	(Italy) Thiago Motta (Paris Saint-Germain)	(Colombia) James Rodríguez (Monaco)
Attack	(Sweden) Zlatan Ibrahimović (Paris Saint-Germain)		(Uruguay) Edinson Cavani (Paris Saint-Germain)	
