= Gransart =

Gransart is a surname. Notable people with the surname include:

- Maurice Gransart (1930–2013), French footballer
- Roland Gransart (born 1954), French footballer and manager
