= 2016–17 Ligue 1 =

79th season of top-tier French football

Ligue 1
- Season: 2016–17
- Dates: 12 August 2016 – 20 May 2017
- Champions: Monaco; 8th Ligue 1 title 8th French title
- Relegated: Lorient; Nancy; Bastia
- Champions League: Monaco; Paris Saint-Germain; Nice
- Europa League: Lyon; Marseille; Bordeaux
- Matches: 380
- Goals: 991 (2.61 per match)
- Top goalscorer: Edinson Cavani (35 goals)
- Biggest home win: Monaco 6–0 Nancy (5 November 2016)
- Biggest away win: Metz 0–7 Monaco (7 October 2016)
- Highest scoring: Monaco 6–2 Montpellier (21 October 2016)
- Longest winning run: 12 matches Monaco
- Longest unbeaten run: 20 matches Monaco
- Longest winless run: 13 matches Bastia
- Longest losing run: 5 matches Angers; Lorient; Montpellier
- Highest attendance: 65,252; Marseille 1–5 Paris Saint-Germain (26 February 2017)
- Lowest attendance: 4,319; Monaco 2–1 Caen (21 December 2016)
- Total attendance: 7,806,638
- Average attendance: 21,099

The 2016–17 Ligue 1 season was the 79th season since its establishment. Paris Saint-Germain were the defending champions. The fixtures were announced on 1 June 2016. The season began on 12 August 2016 and ended on 20 May 2017.

On 17 May 2017, Monaco secured the title after 37 matches, their first since the 1999–2000 season, the first under the Ligue 1 name and their eighth French title in total.

== Teams ==
There were 20 clubs in the league, with three promoted teams from Ligue 2 replacing the three teams that were relegated from Ligue 1 following the 2015–16 season. All clubs that secured Ligue 1 status for the season were subject to approval by the DNCG before becoming eligible to participate.

=== Stadia and locations ===
Location of teams in 2016–17 Ligue 1

Club	Location	Venue	Capacity
Angers	Angers	Stade Raymond Kopa	17,835
Bastia	Bastia	Stade Armand Cesari	16,480
Bordeaux	Bordeaux	Matmut Atlantique	42,115
Caen	Caen	Stade Michel d'Ornano	20,453
Dijon	Dijon	Stade Gaston Gérard	16,098
Guingamp	Guingamp	Stade du Roudourou	18,126
Lille	Villeneuve-d'Ascq	Stade Pierre-Mauroy	50,186
Lorient	Lorient	Stade du Moustoir	18,890
Lyon	Décines-Charpieu	Parc OL	59,186
Marseille	Marseille	Stade Vélodrome	67,381
Metz	Metz	Stade Saint-Symphorien	25,636
Monaco	Monaco	Stade Louis II	18,500
Montpellier	Montpellier	Stade de la Mosson	32,939
Nancy	Tomblaine	Stade Marcel Picot	20,087
Nantes	Nantes	Stade de la Beaujoire	38,285
Nice	Nice	Allianz Riviera	35,624
Paris Saint-Germain	Paris	Parc des Princes	48,712
Rennes	Rennes	Roazhon Park	29,376
Saint-Étienne	Saint-Étienne	Stade Geoffroy-Guichard	42,000
Toulouse	Toulouse	Stadium Municipal	35,470

=== Personnel and kits ===
Team	Manager	Captain	Kit Manufacturer	Shirt sponsors (front)	Shirt sponsors (back)	Shirt sponsors (sleeve)	Shorts sponsors	Socks sponsors
Angers	(France) Stéphane Moulin	(Senegal) Cheikh N'Doye	Kappa	Scania (H)/Bodet (A)/Rénoval vérandas (in league cup matches), L'Atoll Angers, Brioche Pasquier, Angers	La Boucherie	Algimouss	Système U	None
Bastia	(Portugal) Rui Almeida	(France) Yannick Cahuzac	Kappa	Oscaro, Collectivité Territoriale de Corse, Corsica Ferries, Vito Corse, Athys Ltd	Pago	Qwant, Haute-Corse	Che Rebel Spirit Energy Drink, No Publik	None
Bordeaux	(France) Jocelyn Gourvennec	(Czech Republic) Jaroslav Plašil	Puma	Mon Cartable Connecté/Hôpital des Enfants du CHU de Bordeaux/Groupe Sweetcom (H)/MonAlbumPhoto.fr (A)/PSI (in league cup matches), Sports Weather	MonAlbumPhoto.fr (H)/Groupe Sweetcom (A)	Heart Protekt	Winamax, Pitaya Thai	None
Caen	(France) Patrice Garande	(France) Julien Féret	Umbro	Maisons France Confort (H)/ Campagne de France (A & 3), Künkel, Petit Forestier	Groupe IDEC	Alticap	None	None
Dijon	(France) Olivier Dall'Oglio	(France) Cédric Varrault	Lotto	Groupe Roger Martin (H)/Suez (A), Incendie Protection Sécurité, DVF	DORAS (H)/Transalp Renouvellement (A)	Leader Interim, Auteur des Williams, Coup d'Pouce	Engie, Dalkia	Caisse d'Épargne
Guingamp	(New Caledonia) Antoine Kombouaré	(France) Jimmy Briand	Patrick	Servagroupe (H)/Aroma Celte (A), Société ADS, Breizh Cola	Rapidoprêt	None	BRIEUC biscuiterie, caramelerie, confiturerie	None
Lille	(France) Franck Passi (caretaker)	(France) Rio Mavuba	New Balance	Partouche	Vacansoleil	Boulanger	No Publik	None
Lorient	(France) Bernard Casoni	(France) Benjamin Lecomte	Adidas	B&B Hotels (H)/Jean Floc'h (A), Jean Floc'h (H)/B&B Hotels (A), Breizh Cola	Salaün Holidays	Ria Money Transfer	Virage Conseil	None
Lyon	(France) Bruno Génésio	(France) Maxime Gonalons	Adidas	Hyundai/Veolia (in UEFA matches), Groupama, MDA Electroménager	ALILA Promoteur	Cegid/24Option.com	Intermarché	None
Marseille	(France) Rudi Garcia	(France) Bafétimbi Gomis	Adidas	Intersport (H & A)/Mutuelles du Soleil (3)	Boulanger	Mutuelles du Soleil	Winamax	None
Metz	(France) Philippe Hinschberger	(France) Kévin Lejeune	Nike	Tchad: Oasis du Sahel/Force Glass/Groupe Rega, Moselle, Théobald Automobiles, Inter-Conseil Intérim	Tchad: Oasis du Sahel/Force Glass	Bigben	E.Leclerc Moselle	None
Monaco	(Portugal) Leonardo Jardim	(Colombia) Radamel Falcao	Nike	Fedcom	None	Triangle Intérim	Orezza	None
Montpellier	(France) Jean-Louis Gasset	(Brazil) Vitorino Hilton	Nike	Sud de France, Dyneff Gaz, Montpellier Métropole, Mutuelles du Soleil	SOS Malus	FAUN-Environnement	Système U, O'Tacos, Myprotein	None
Nancy	(Uruguay) Pablo Correa	(Morocco) Youssouf Hadji	Nike	Groupe Sweetcom, Groupe dlsi, Lorraine Repro (H)/MDA Electroménager (A)	Casino JOA	Wati B	Caisse d'Épargne	None
Nantes	(Portugal) Sérgio Conceição	(France) Rémy Riou	Umbro	Synergie, Manitou, Proginov	Anvolia	Flamino	Winamax, etixx	None
Nice	(Switzerland) Lucien Favre	(Brazil) Dante	Macron	Mutuelles du Soleil, Ville de Nice, Métropole Nice Côte d'Azur	Pizzorno Environnement	Airton France	Winamax	None
Paris Saint-Germain	(Spain) Unai Emery	(Brazil) Thiago Silva	Nike	Fly Emirates	Ooredoo	QNB	None	None
Rennes	(France) Christian Gourcuff	(Portugal) Pedro Mendes	Puma	Samsic, Del Arte, Armor-Lux, Association ELA	Blot Immobilier	rennes.fr	Bretagne Structures	None
Saint-Étienne	(France) Christophe Galtier	(France) Loïc Perrin	Le Coq Sportif	EoviMcd Mutuelle, Loire	BewellConnect	MARKAL	Desjoyaux Piscines	None
Toulouse	(France) Pascal Dupraz	(Denmark) Martin Braithwaite	Joma	Triangle Intérim, Natur House, LP Promotion	Newrest	Prévoir Assurances	So Toulouse	None

=== Managerial changes ===
Team	Outgoing manager	Manner of departure	Date of vacancy	Position in table	Incoming manager	Date of appointment
Nantes	(Armenia) Michel Der Zakarian	End of contract	17 May 2016	Pre-season	(France) René Girard	17 May 2016
Rennes	(France) Rolland Courbis	End of contract	17 May 2016	Pre-season	(France) Christian Gourcuff	17 May 2016
Nice	(France) Claude Puel	Mutual consent	24 May 2016	Pre-season	(Switzerland) Lucien Favre	24 May 2016
Guingamp	(France) Jocelyn Gourvennec	Signed by Bordeaux	27 May 2016	Pre-season	(New Caledonia) Antoine Kombouaré	30 May 2016
Bordeaux	(France) Ulrich Ramé	End of contract	27 May 2016	Pre-season	(France) Jocelyn Gourvennec	27 May 2016
Paris Saint-Germain	(France) Laurent Blanc	Resigned	27 June 2016	Pre-season	(Spain) Unai Emery	28 June 2016
Marseille	(France) Franck Passi	End of interim	20 October 2016	12th	(France) Rudi Garcia	20 October 2016
Lorient	(France) Sylvain Ripoll	Resigned	23 October 2016	20th	(France) Bernard Casoni	8 November 2016
Lille	(France) Frédéric Antonetti	Resigned	22 November 2016	19th	(France) Patrick Collot (caretaker)	22 November 2016
Nantes	(France) René Girard	Resigned	1 December 2016	19th	(Portugal) Sérgio Conceição	8 December 2016
Montpellier	(France) Frédéric Hantz	Sacked	30 January 2017	15th	(France) Jean-Louis Gasset	30 January 2017
Lille	(France) Patrick Collot	End of interim	14 February 2017	17th	(France) Franck Passi (caretaker)	14 February 2017
Bastia	(France) François Ciccolini	Sacked	27 February 2017	19th	(Portugal) Rui Almeida	27 February 2017

== League table ==
Pos	Team	Pld	W	D	L	GF	GA	GD	Pts	Qualification or relegation
1	Monaco (C)	38	30	5	3	107	31	+76	95	Qualification for the Champions League group stage
2	Paris Saint-Germain	38	27	6	5	83	27	+56	87	Qualification for the Champions League group stage
3	Nice	38	22	12	4	63	36	+27	78	Qualification for the Champions League third qualifying round
4	Lyon	38	21	4	13	77	48	+29	67	Qualification for the Europa League group stage (Note: Since the winners of the 2016–17 Coupe de France and the 2016–17 Coupe de la Ligue, Paris Saint-Germain, qualified for European competition based on league position, the spot awarded to the Coupe de France winners (Europa League group stage) was passed to the fourth-placed team and the spot awarded to the Coupe de la Ligue winners (Europa League third qualifying round) was passed to the sixth-placed team. The fifth-placed team received the spot in Europa League third qualifying round originally designated to the fourth-placed team.)
5	Marseille	38	17	11	10	57	41	+16	62	Qualification for the Europa League third qualifying round
6	Bordeaux	38	15	14	9	53	43	+10	59	Qualification for the Europa League third qualifying round
7	Nantes	38	14	9	15	40	54	−14	51	
8	Saint-Étienne	38	12	14	12	41	42	−1	50	
9	Rennes	38	12	14	12	36	42	−6	50	
10	Guingamp	38	14	8	16	46	53	−7	50	
11	Lille	38	13	7	18	40	47	−7	46	
12	Angers	38	13	7	18	40	49	−9	46	
13	Toulouse	38	10	14	14	37	41	−4	44	
14	Metz	38	11	10	17	39	72	−33	43	
15	Montpellier	38	10	9	19	48	66	−18	39	
16	Dijon	38	8	13	17	46	58	−12	37	
17	Caen	38	10	7	21	36	65	−29	37	
18	Lorient (R)	38	10	6	22	44	70	−26	36	Qualification for the relegation play-offs
19	Nancy (R)	38	9	8	21	29	52	−23	35	Relegation to Ligue 2
20	Bastia (D, R)	38	8	10	20	29	54	−25	34	Relegation to National 3 (Note: After being relegated to Ligue 2, Bastia was initially further relegated to National due to financial difficulties. On 10 August 2017, the FFF announced that Bastia was denied entry to National. The club therefore took the place of its reserve team in Championnat National 3.)

Source: Ligue 1, Soccerway
Rules for classification: 1) Points; 2) Goal difference; 3) Goals scored; 4) Head-to-head goal difference; 5) Fairplay ranking.
(C) Champions; (D) Disqualified; (R) Relegated

== Results ==
Home \ Away	ANG	BAS	BOR	CAE	DIJ	GUI	LIL	LOR	OL	OM	MET	ASM	MHS	NAL	FCN	NIC	PSG	REN	STE	TFC
Angers	—	3–0	1–1	2–1	3–1	3–0	1–0	2–2	1–2	1–1	2–1	0–1	2–0	1–0	0–2	0–1	0–2	0–0	1–2	0–0
Bastia	1–2	—	1–1	1–1	0–0	1–0	0–1	2–0	0–3 (Note: Match awarded 3–0 to Lyon due to the match being abandoned at half-time, with no score, when Bastia fans stormed the pitch and attacked the Lyon players.)	1–2	2–0	1–1	1–1	0–0	2–2	1–1	0–1	1–0	0–0	2–1
Bordeaux	0–1	2–0	—	0–0	3–2	3–0	0–1	2–1	1–1	1–1	3–0	0–4	5–1	1–1	1–0	0–0	0–3	1–1	3–2	1–0
Caen	2–3	2–0	0–4	—	3–3	1–1	0–1	3–2	3–2	1–5	3–0	0–3	0–2	1–0	0–2	1–0	0–6	0–1	0–2	1–0
Dijon	3–2	1–2	0–0	2–0	—	3–3	0–0	1–0	4–2	1–2	0–0	1–1	3–3	2–0	0–1	0–1	1–3	3–0	0–1	2–0
Guingamp	1–0	5–0	1–1	0–1	4–0	—	1–0	1–0	2–1	2–1	1–0	1–2	1–1	1–0	2–0	0–1	2–1	1–1	0–2	2–1
Lille	1–2	2–1	2–3	4–2	1–0	3–0	—	0–1	0–1	0–0	0–2	1–4	2–1	1–0	3–0	1–2	0–1	1–1	1–1	1–2
Lorient	1–1	0–3	1–1	1–0	2–3	3–1	1–0	—	1–0	1–4	5–1	0–3	2–2	0–2	1–2	0–1	1–2	2–1	2–1	1–1
Lyon	2–0	2–1	1–3	2–0	4–2	1–3	1–2	1–4	—	3–1	5–0	1–2	5–1	4–0	3–2	3–3	1–2	1–0	2–0	4–0
Marseille	3–0	1–0	0–0	1–0	1–1	2–0	2–0	2–0	0–0	—	1–0	1–4	5–1	3–0	2–1	2–1	1–5	2–0	4–0	0–0
Metz	2–0	1–0	0–3	2–2	2–1	2–2	3–2	3–3	0–3	1–0	—	0–7	2–0	2–1	1–1	2–4	2–3	1–1	0–0	1–1
Monaco	2–1	5–0	2–1	2–1	2–1	2–2	4–0	4–0	1–3	4–0	5–0	—	6–2	6–0	4–0	3–0	3–1	3–0	2–0	3–1
Montpellier	1–0	2–1	4–0	3–2	1–1	1–1	0–3	2–0	1–3	3–1	0–1	1–2	—	0–0	2–3	1–1	3–0	1–1	2–1	0–1
Nancy	2–0	1–0	0–2	2–0	1–0	0–2	1–2	2–3	0–3	0–0	4–0	0–3	0–3	—	1–1	0–1	1–2	3–0	3–1	0–0
Nantes	2–1	1–0	0–1	1–0	3–1	4–1	0–0	1–0	0–6	3–2	0–3	0–1	1–0	0–2	—	1–1	0–2	1–2	0–0	1–1
Nice	0–2	1–1	2–1	2–2	2–1	3–1	1–1	2–1	2–0	3–2	0–0	4–0	2–1	3–1	4–1	—	3–1	1–0	1–0	3–0
Paris SG	2–0	5–0	2–0	1–1	3–0	4–0	2–1	5–0	2–1	0–0	3–0	1–1	2–0	1–0	2–0	2–2	—	4–0	1–1	0–0
Rennes	1–1	1–2	1–1	2–0	1–1	1–0	2–0	1–0	1–1	3–2	1–0	2–3	1–0	2–0	1–1	2–2	0–1	—	2–0	1–0
Saint-Étienne	2–1	1–0	2–2	0–1	1–1	1–0	3–1	4–0	2–0	0–0	2–2	1–1	3–1	0–0	1–1	0–1	0–5	1–1	—	0–0
Toulouse	4–0	4–1	4–1	0–1	0–0	2–1	1–1	3–2	1–2	0–0	1–2	3–1	1–0	1–1	0–1	1–1	2–0	0–0	0–3	—

Source: Ligue 1
Legend: Blue = home team win; Yellow = draw; Red = away team win.
For upcoming matches, an "a" indicates there is an article about the rivalry between the two participants.

== Relegation play-offs ==
The 2016–17 season saw the return of relegation play-offs between the 18th placed Ligue 1 team, Lorient, and the 3rd placed Ligue 2 team, Troyes, on a two-legged confrontation.

25 May 2017
20:45 CEST

Troyes	2–1	Lorient
Darbion 37'; Nivet 90+1'	Report	Waris 82'

Stade de l'Aube, Troyes
Attendance: 14,081
Referee: Ruddy Buquet

28 May 2017
21:00 CEST

Lorient	0–0	Troyes
	Report

Stade du Moustoir, Lorient
Attendance: 16,000
Referee: Clément Turpin

Troyes won 2–1 on aggregate and were promoted to 2017–18 Ligue 1; Lorient were relegated to 2017–18 Ligue 2.

== Season statistics ==
=== Top goalscorers ===
Rank	Player	Club	Goals
1	(Uruguay) Edinson Cavani	Paris Saint-Germain	35
2	(France) Alexandre Lacazette	Lyon	28
3	(Colombia) Radamel Falcao	Monaco	21
4	(France) Bafétimbi Gomis	Marseille	20
5	(Italy) Mario Balotelli	Nice	15
5	(France) Kylian Mbappé	Monaco	15
5	(Croatia) Ivan Santini	Caen	15
5	(France) Florian Thauvin	Marseille	15
9	(France) Nicolas de Préville	Lille	14
9	(Benin) Steve Mounié	Montpellier	14

=== Hat-tricks ===
Player	Club	Against	Result	Date
(France) Alexandre Lacazette	Lyon	Nancy	3–0 (A)	14 August 2016
(Turkey) Mevlüt Erdinç	Metz	Nantes	3–0 (A)	11 September 2016
(Uruguay) Edinson Cavani^{4}	Paris Saint-Germain	Caen	6–0 (A)	16 September 2016
(Chad) Casimir Ninga	Montpellier	Dijon	3–3 (A)	1 October 2016
(France) Alassane Pléa	Nice	Metz	4–2 (A)	24 October 2016
(Colombia) Radamel Falcao	Monaco	Bordeaux	4–0 (A)	10 December 2016
(Sweden) Ola Toivonen	Toulouse	Lorient	3–2 (H)	10 December 2016
(France) Bafétimbi Gomis	Marseille	Montpellier	5–1 (H)	27 January 2017
(France) Kylian Mbappé	Monaco	Metz	5–0 (H)	11 February 2017
(France) Florian Thauvin	Marseille	Caen	5–1 (A)	30 April 2017
(France) Nicolas de Préville	Lille	Nantes	3–0 (H)	20 May 2017

Note

^{4} Player scored 4 goals

==== Clean sheets ====
Rank	Player	Club	Clean sheets
1	(France) Yohann Pelé	Marseille	18
2	(Croatia) Danijel Subašić	Monaco	17
3	(Germany) Kevin Trapp	Paris Saint-Germain	15
4	(France) Benoît Costil	Rennes	12
4	(Portugal) Anthony Lopes	Lyon	12
6	(France) Yoan Cardinale	Nice	11
6	(France) Stéphane Ruffier	Saint-Étienne	11
8	(France) Alban Lafont	Toulouse	10
9	(France) Cédric Carrasso	Bordeaux	9
9	(France) Thomas Didillon	Metz	9

== Awards ==
Award	Winner	Club
Player of the Season	(Uruguay) Edinson Cavani	Paris Saint-Germain
Young Player of the Season	(France) Kylian Mbappé	Monaco
Goalkeeper of the Season	(Croatia) Danijel Subašić	Monaco
Goal of the Season	(Netherlands) Memphis Depay	Lyon
Manager of the Season	(Portugal) Leonardo Jardim	Monaco

Team of the Year
Goalkeeper	(Croatia) Danijel Subašić (Monaco)			
Defenders	(France) Djibril Sidibé (Monaco)	(Poland) Kamil Glik (Monaco)	(Brazil) Thiago Silva (Paris Saint-Germain)	(France) Benjamin Mendy (Monaco)
Midfielders	(Ivory Coast) Jean Michaël Seri (Nice)	(Italy) Marco Verratti (Paris Saint-Germain)		(Portugal) Bernardo Silva (Monaco)
Forwards	(France) Kylian Mbappé (Monaco)	(Uruguay) Edinson Cavani (Paris Saint-Germain)		(France) Alexandre Lacazette (Lyon)

== Attendances ==
These are the average attendances of the teams.

Pos	Team	Total	High	Low	Average	Change
1	Paris Saint-Germain	861,020	47,929		45,317	n/a
2	Marseille	758,061	65,252		39,898	n/a
3	Lyon	744,248	57,050		39,171	n/a
4	Lille	560,257	40,485		29,487	n/a
5	Saint-Étienne	490,263	37,029		25,803	n/a
6	Bordeaux	460,127	41,265		24,217	n/a
7	Nantes	439,886	32,858		23,152	n/a
8	Nice	436,035	33,190		22,949	n/a
9	Rennes	431,082	29,054		22,689	n/a
10	Nancy	332,801	20,087		17,516	n/a
11	Toulouse	324,294	29,425		17,068	n/a
12	Caen	300,119	20,054		15,796	n/a
13	Metz	291,508	21,009		15,343	n/a
14	Guingamp	281,003	18,033		14,790	n/a
15	Montpellier	234,763	22,217		12,356	n/a
16	Angers	227,121	15,909		11,954	n/a
17	Lorient	224,802	15,884		11,832	n/a
18	Dijon	192,433	13,416		10,128	n/a
19	Monaco	180,485	16,049		9,499	n/a
20	Bastia	178,682	13,135		9,405	n/a
	League total	0	0	0	0	n/a

Source: worldfootball.net
