= Redin (surname) =

Redin is a surname. Notable people with the surname include:

- Antoine Redin (1934–2012), French footballer and manager
- Bernardo Redín (born 1963), Colombian footballer and manager
- Martin de Redin (1579–1660), Spanish military officer and politician
- Mikael Redin (born 1989), Swiss figure skater
