= Claude Papi =

French footballer (1949–1983)

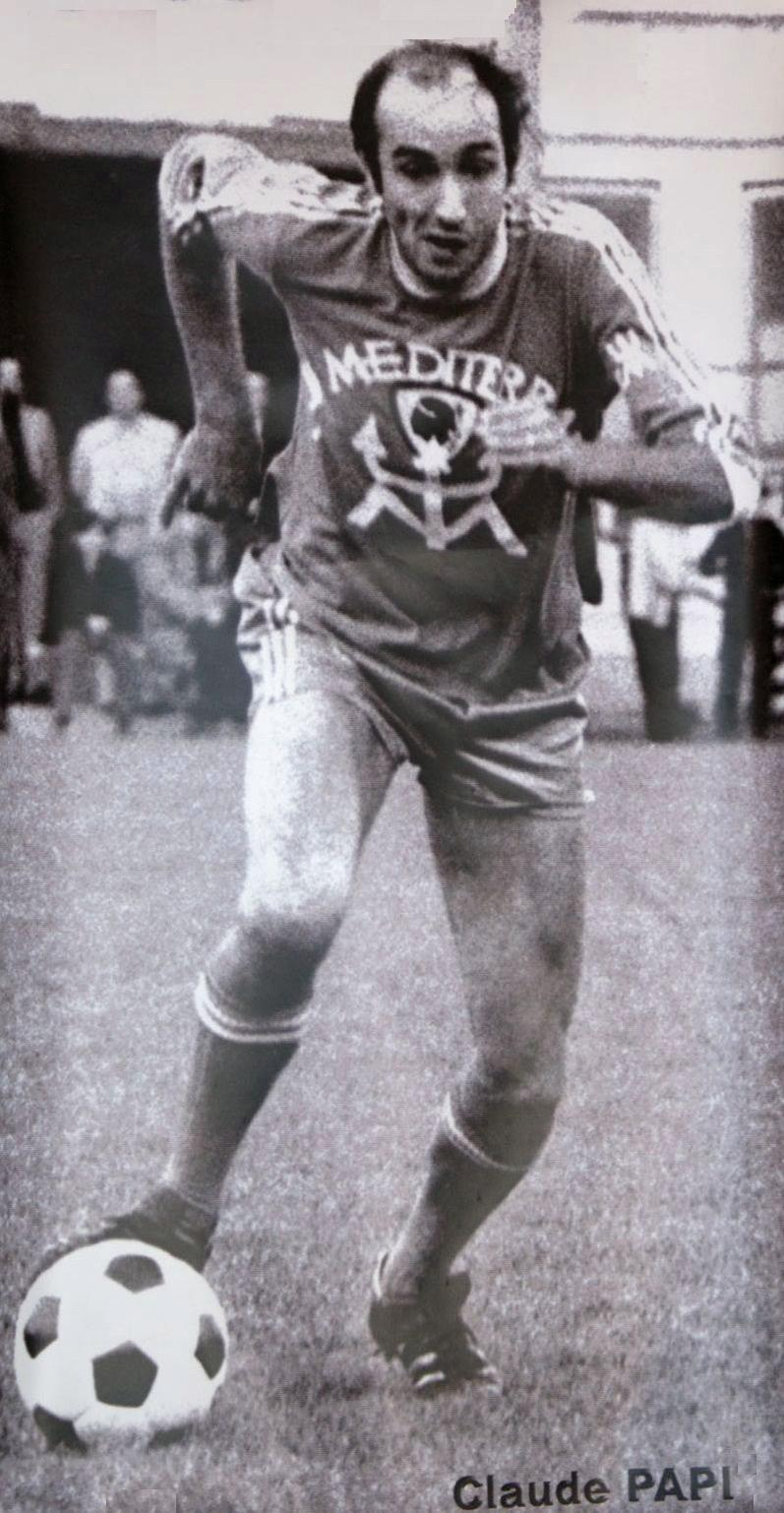
- Papi in 1978

Personal information
- Date of birth: 16 April 1949
- Place of birth: Porto-Vecchio, France
- Date of death: 28 January 1983 (aged 33)
- Place of death: Porto-Vecchio, France
- Height: 1.78 m (5 ft 10 in)
- Position: Midfielder

Senior career*
Years	Team	Apps	(Gls)
1967–1982	Bastia	410	(115)

International career
1973–1978	France	3	(0)
- * Club domestic league appearances and goals

Claude Papi (16 April 1949 – 28 January 1983) was a French football midfielder who is regarded as the all-time best player for the SC Bastia.

== Playing career ==
Born in Porto-Vecchio, Corsica, Papi played his entire career for SC Bastia. He led Bastia to the 1978 UEFA Cup Final, scoring seven goals that season. Papi remains the all-time leading scorer for Bastia with 134 goals in 479 games.

== International career ==
Papi was a member of the France national team in the 1978 FIFA World Cup. His only World Cup appearance came in a 3–1 group match win against Hungary.

== Death ==
Papi died on 28 January 1983 at the age of 33 of a ruptured aneurysm.

== Honours ==
Bastia

- Ligue 2: 1967–68
- Coupe de France: 1980–81
- Challenge des champions: 1972
- UEFA Cup runner-up: 1978

== See also ==
- List of one-club men in association football
