= 1981 Coupe de France final =

- Event: 1980–81 Coupe de France
Bastia	Saint-Étienne
2	1
- Date: 13 June 1981
- Venue: Parc des Princes, Paris
- Referee: Georges Konrath
- Attendance: 46,155

The 1981 Coupe de France final was a football match held at Parc des Princes, Paris on 13 June 1981, that saw Bastia defeat Saint-Étienne 2–1 thanks to goals by Louis Marcialis and Roger Milla.

== Match details ==
13 June 1981

Bastia	2–1	Saint-Étienne
Marcialis 50'; Milla 58'		Santini 72'

Parc des Princes, Paris
Attendance: 46,155
Referee: Georges Konrath

GK		(France) Pierrick Hiard
DF		(France) Jean-Louis Cazes
DF	3	(France) Paul Marchioni (c)
DF		(France) Charles Orlanducci
DF		(France) Félix Lacuesta
MF		(France) Jean-Louis Desvignes
MF		(France) Alain Fiard
MF		(France) Joël Henry
FW	7	(France) Louis Marcialis
FW		(Cameroon) Roger Milla
FW		(France) Simeï Ihily
Manager:
(France) Antoine Redin Assistant referees: Fourth official:

GK	1	(France) Jean Castaneda
DF	(France) Patrick Battiston
DF	(France) Gérard Janvion
DF	(France) Bernard Gardon	(substituted off) 18'
DF	(France) Christian Lopez (c)
MF	(France) Jacques Santini
MF	(France) Jean-Marie Elie
MF	(France) Michel Platini
FW	(France) Jacques Zimako
FW	(France) Laurent Roussey	(substituted off) 86'
FW	(Netherlands) Johnny Rep
Substitutes:
DF	(France) Jean-Philippe Primard	(substituted in) 18'
FW	(France) Laurent Paganelli	(substituted in) 86'
Manager:
(France) Robert Herbin

== See also ==
- Coupe de France 1980-81
