= Michel Moretti =

French footballer (born 1989)

Personal information
- Date of birth: 26 May 1989 (age 37)
- Place of birth: Bastia, France
- Height: 1.75 m (5 ft 9 in)
- Position: Midfielder

Team information
- Current team: Bastia (manager)

Senior career*
Years	Team	Apps	(Gls)
2007–2009	Bastia B		
2009–2015	CA Bastia	161	(2)
2015–2016	AS Nebbiu		
2016–2018	Furiani-Agliani	38	(1)
2018–2021	Bastia	59	(6)

Managerial career
- 2024: Bastia
- * Club domestic league appearances and goals

Michel Moretti (born 26 May 1989) is a French football manager and former player who is assistant manager at Ligue 2 club Bastia. He played as a midfielder.

== Career ==
Moretti made his professional debut with CA Bastia in Ligue 2 on 4 August 2013, in a match against Lens.
