= François Ciccolini =

French football manager (born 1962)

Personal information
- Full name: François Ciccolini
- Date of birth: 3 June 1962 (age 64)
- Place of birth: Cozzano, France
- Position: Forward

Senior career*
Years	Team	Apps	(Gls)
1982–1984	Olympique Ajaccio		
1984–1985	Saint-Dizier		
1985–1986	Olympique Ajaccio		
1986–1988	Bastia	18	(0)
1988–1990	Gazélec Ajaccio		

Managerial career
- 1997–2000: Porto Vecchio
- 2000–2004: Bastia (youth teams)
- 2004–2005: Bastia
- 2008–2009: Red Star
- 2009–2011: Monaco (youth teams)
- 2011: Neuchâtel Xamax
- 2014: JS Kabylie
- 2016–2017: Bastia
- 2018–2019: Laval
- 2019–2020: Gazélec Ajaccio
- 2020: USM Alger
- 2024: Adanaspor
- * Club domestic league appearances and goals

François Ciccolini (born 3 June 1962) is a French football manager and former player who last coached Adanaspor in Turkey.

== Career ==
Born in Cozzano, Corsica, Ciccolini spent most of his playing career as a forward on the island, with Bastia and Gazélec Ajaccio. In his first managerial job with Porto-Vecchio, he took them to the last 32 of the 1999–2000 Coupe de France, before losing to Bordeaux. He then moved into the ranks of Bastia, becoming manager in 2004; he was sacked in April 2005, with the team 19th in Ligue 1.

Ciccolini returned to management in 2008 at Red Star, and was dismissed the following March with the team in danger of relegation. After working with the youth teams of Monaco, he took the job at Neuchâtel Xamax in June 2011. Following defeat in the first two games of the Swiss Super League season, he was dismissed in July and replaced by Joaquín Caparrós.

In October 2014, Ciccolini was hired at JS Kabylie in Algeria, but left two months later to rejoin Bastia. He served as assistant to Ghislain Printant, before taking the job outright in January 2016, with the team three points outside the relegation zone. They finished the season in 10th, but by the end of February 2017, they were 19th; he was dismissed and replaced by Rui Almeida.

Ciccolini's next job was at Laval in the third-tier Championnat National. Early on in his tenure in August 2018, he made a threat of physical violence towards a Radio France journalist, and earned a five-month ban, with the last two suspended. The following February, he made an obscene gesture towards fans at JA Drancy, and left his job by mutual consent days later.

In June 2019, Ciccolini returned to Gazélec on a two-year deal as manager, after the team's play-off relegation from Ligue 2. In May 2020, he was sacked, following the team's relegation to Championnat National 2.

In November 2020, Ciccolini was appointed at USM Alger back in Algeria. He was dismissed after his debut, a 2–1 loss to CR Belouizdad in the Super Cup, for "disrespecting government officials" by refusing to take a runners-up medal from prime minister Abdelaziz Djerad.
