= Gyula Nagy =

Hungarian footballer (1924–1996)

Personal information
- Date of birth: 7 April 1924
- Place of birth: Szob, Hungary
- Date of death: 10 March 1996 (aged 71)
- Place of death: Marseillan, France
- Positions: Midfielder; forward

Senior career*
Years	Team	Apps	(Gls)
- Vasas SC
1947–1948	Roubaix-Tourcoing	15	(5)
1948–1949	Colmar	17	(4)
1949–1951	Fiorentina	16	(6)
1951	Toulouse	5	(0)
1951–1953	FC Sète	48	(13)
1953–1954	Grenoble		
1954–1955	CA Paris	35	(16)
1955–1956	FC Sète	27	(4)
1956–1958	Olympique Alès	78	(19)
1959	AS Béziers	19	(2)
1959–1963	Metz	29	(5)
1966–1967	Besançon RC	1	(0)

Managerial career
- 1959–1963: Metz
- 1963–1964: Bastia
- 1965–1966: Bastia
- 1970: Bastia
- 1977–1978: FC Sète
- * Club domestic league appearances and goals

Gyula Nagy (7 April 1924 – 10 March 1996), also referred to as Jules Nagy, was a Hungarian football player and manager.

Born in Szob, Nagy began his playing career with a local club in his hometown before joining Vasas SC in 1945. He later moved to France, where he played for several clubs, including a two-year spell with Fiorentina. While still an active player, he began his managerial career with Metz and later coached Bastia and FC Sète.

== Managerial record (all seasons) ==
Team	Season	Championship	Placement
Metz	1959/60	Division 2	6th
Metz	1960/61	Division 2	2nd ▲
Metz	1961/62	Division 1	20th ▼
Metz	1962/63	Division 2	9th
Bastia	1963/64	CFA	4th
Bastia	1965/66	Division 2	4th
Bastia	1970/71	Division 1	17th
Sète	1977/78	Division 3 (South)	10th

== External links and references ==
- Barreaud, Marc (1998). Dictionnaire des footballeurs étrangers du championnat professionnel français (1932-1997). L'Harmattan, Paris. ISBN 2-7384-6608-7.
