= Maurice Gransart =

French footballer (1930–2013)

Personal information
- Date of birth: 8 July 1930
- Date of death: 27 April 2013 (aged 82)
- Height: 1.76 m (5 ft 9 in)
- Position: Defender

Senior career*
Years	Team	Apps	(Gls)
1948–1961	Marseille		
- * Club domestic league appearances and goals

Maurice Gransart (8 July 1930 – 27 April 2013) was a French professional footballer who played for Marseille, as a defender. His son was Roland Gransart.
