= Jacques Zimako =

New Caledonian footballer (1951–2021)

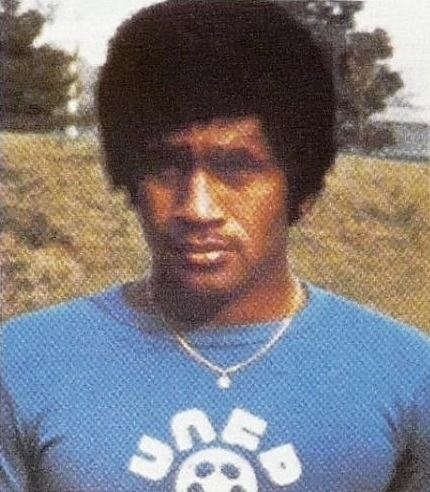
- Zimako in 1975

Personal information
- Date of birth: 28 December 1951
- Place of birth: Lifou, New Caledonia, France
- Date of death: 8 December 2021 (aged 69)
- Height: 1.75 m (5 ft 9 in)
- Position: Forward

Senior career*
Years	Team	Apps	(Gls)
1972–1977	Bastia	134	(42)
1977–1981	Saint-Étienne	120	(30)
1981–1983	Sochaux	62	(8)
1983–1985	Bastia	68	(10)
Total		384	(90)

International career
1977–1981	France	13	(2)
1987	New Caledonia		

Managerial career
- 1995: New Caledonia
- * Club domestic league appearances and goals

Jacques Zimako (28 December 1951 – 8 December 2021) was a New Caledonian professional footballer who played as a forward.

== Biography ==
Zimako was born in Lifou, New Caledonia. He played for SC Bastia, AS Saint-Étienne and FC Sochaux-Montbéliard. He was capped 13 times for France national team, scoring two goals. He was the first footballer of Kanak origin to play for France and the cousin of Marc-Kanyan Case.

He died on 8 December 2021, at the age of 69.

== Honours ==
Saint-Étienne

- Division 1: 1981
