= Alain Moizan =

French footballer and manager (born 1953)

Personal information
- Date of birth: 18 November 1953 (age 72)
- Place of birth: Saint-Louis, French Senegal
- Height: 1.81 m (5 ft 11 in)
- Position: Defensive midfielder

Senior career*
Years	Team	Apps	(Gls)
1975–1977	AS Angoulême	58	(2)
1977–1980	Monaco	106	(4)
1980–1982	Lyon	67	(10)
1982–1984	Saint-Étienne	50	(0)
1984–1986	Bastia	54	(0)
1986–1988	Cannes	52	(1)
Total		387	(17)

International career
1979–1981	France	7	(0)

Managerial career
- 1985–1986: Bastia (caretaker)
- 2004: Mali
- 2005–2006: Lyon La Duchère
- 2008: Mauritania
- 2012–2014: New Caledonia
- 2010–: Magenta
Medal record
Men's football
Representing New Caledonia (as manager)
OFC Nations Cup
Runner-up	2012
- * Club domestic league appearances and goals

Alain Moizan (born 18 November 1953) is a French former professional footballer who played as a midfielder.

In February 2008, he was appointed coach of the Mauritania national team, his second national team coaching job after a short stint with Mali in 2004.
