= Lucien Jasseron =

French footballer (1913-1999)

Personal information
- Date of birth: 29 December 1913
- Place of birth: Oran, French Algeria
- Date of death: 15 November 1999 (aged 85)
- Place of death: Strasbourg, France
- Position: Midfielder

Senior career*
Years	Team	Apps	(Gls)
?–?	AS Batna		
?–?	RU Alger		
1936–1940	Le Havre		
1944–1946	RC Paris		

International career
1945	France	2	(0)

Managerial career
- 1957–1962: Le Havre
- 1962–1966: Lyon
- 1966–02/1969: Bastia
- 1980–1981: FC Villefranche
- * Club domestic league appearances and goals

Lucien Jasseron (29 December 1913 in Oran – 15 November 1999 in Strasbourg) was a French footballer.

He played for Le Havre AC and RC Paris, and was part of France in the 1938 World Cup. He then had a coaching career.
