= Robert Nouzaret =

French footballer and manager (born 1943)

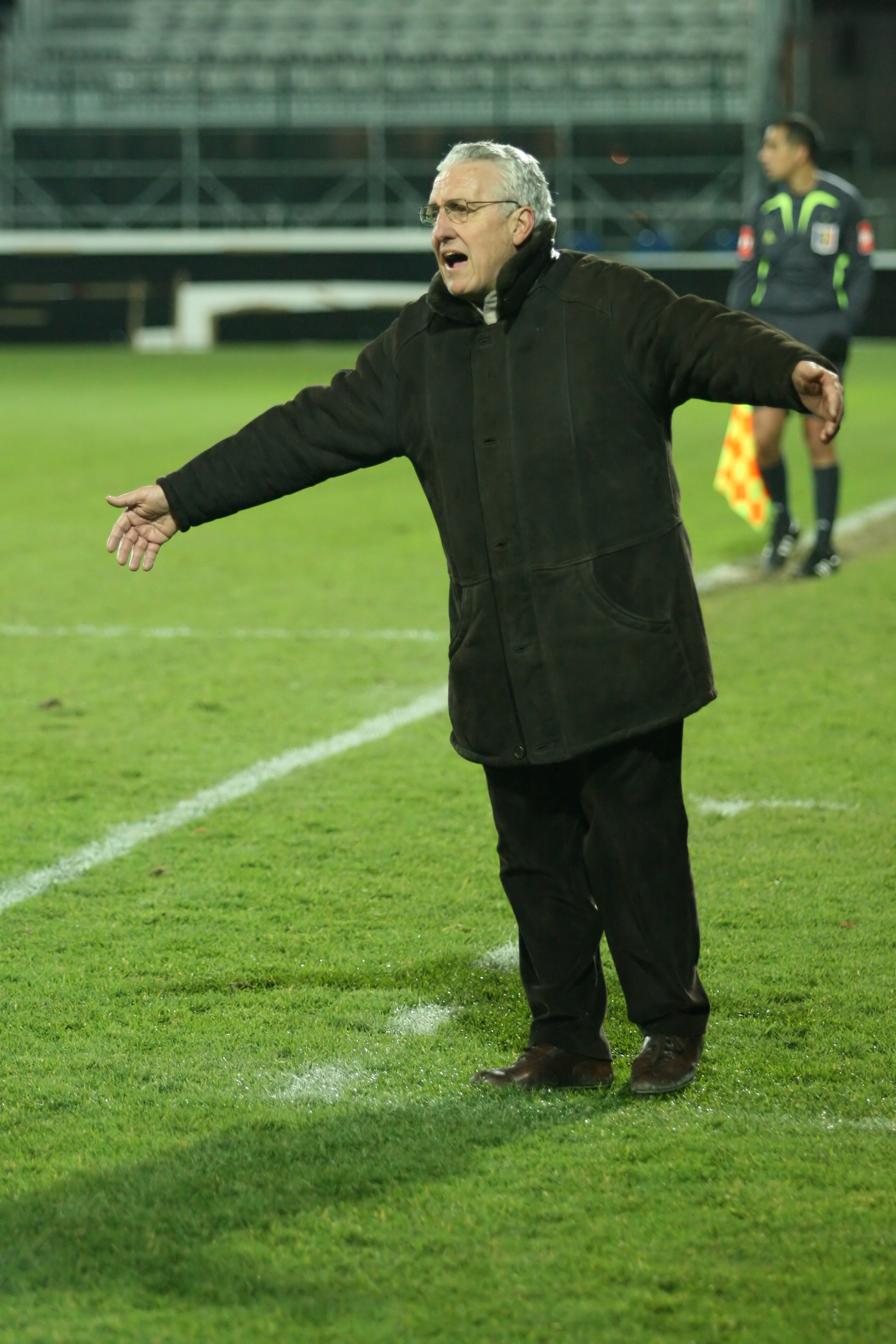
- Nouzaret as Guinea manager in 2007

Personal information
- Date of birth: 29 September 1943 (age 83)
- Place of birth: Marseille, France
- Height: 1.75 m (5 ft 9 in)
- Position: Midfielder

Senior career*
Years	Team	Apps	(Gls)
1964–1969	Lyon		
1969–1970	Bordeaux		
1970–1972	Montpellier		
1972–1974	Gueugnon		
1974–1976	Orléans		

Managerial career
- 1976–1980: Montpellier
- 1980–1982: SR Saint-Dié
- 1982–1983: FC Bourges
- 1983–1985: Montpellier
- 1985–10/1987: Lyon
- 1988–12/1989: Caen
- 1991–1996: Montpellier (sport manager)
- 1996–1998: Ivory Coast
- 1998–2000: Saint-Étienne
- 2000–2001: Toulouse
- 2001–2002: Bastia
- 2002–2004: Ivory Coast
- 2004–2004: Montpellier
- 2005: MC Alger
- 2006–2009: Guinea
- 2010–2011: DR Congo
- * Club domestic league appearances and goals

Robert Nouzaret (born 29 September 1943) is a French football manager and former player.

== Managerial career ==
On 31 August 2011, Nouzaret resigned as DR Congo coach following a difference in opinion with the football federation over the Frenchman’s assistants.
