= Michel Padovani =

French footballer (born 1962)

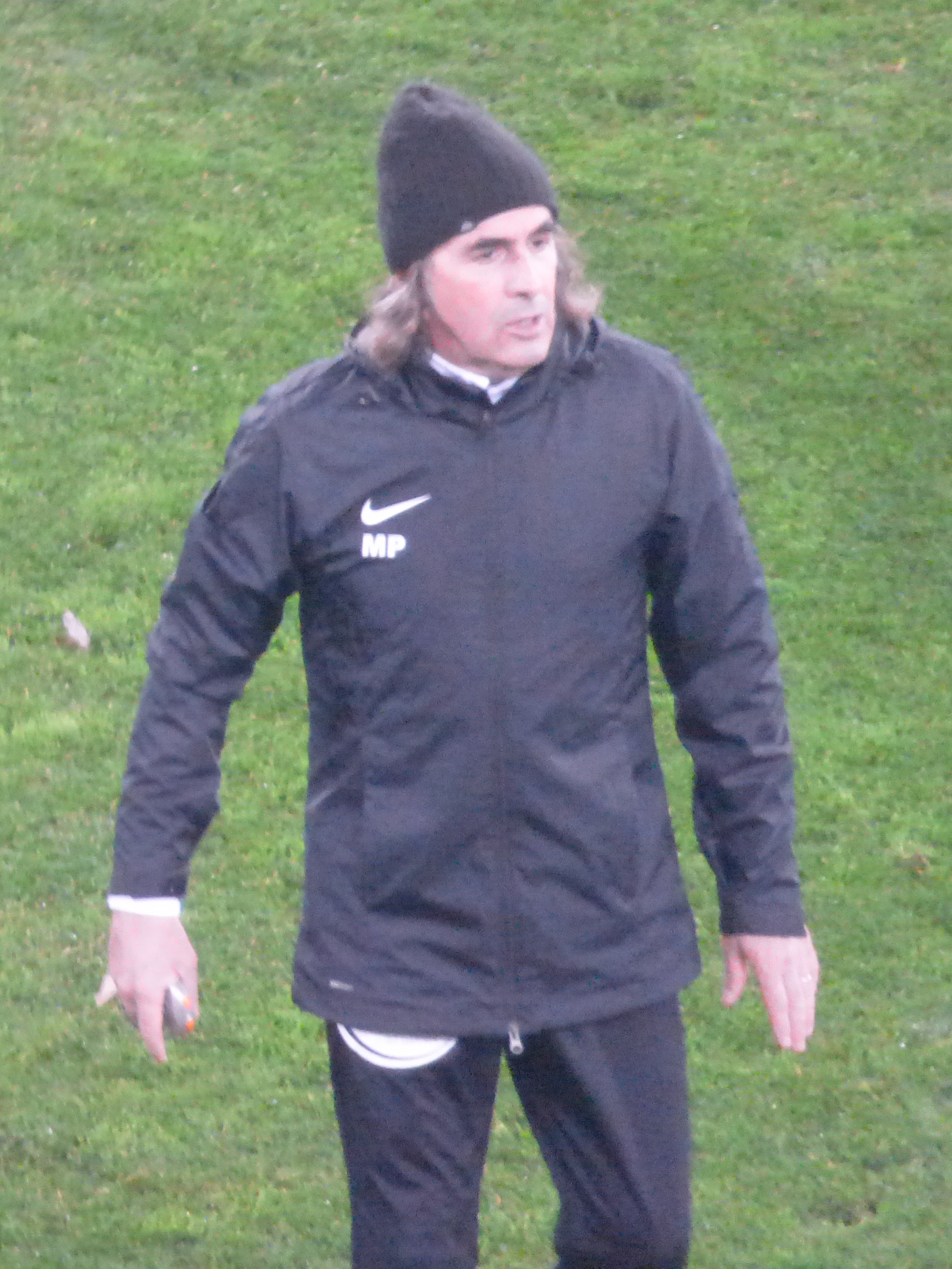
- Padovani with Brest in 2018

Personal information
- Date of birth: 21 January 1962 (age 64)
- Place of birth: Luri, France
- Height: 1.73 m (5 ft 8 in)
- Position: Midfielder

Senior career*
| Years | Team | Apps | (Gls) |
| 1981–1989 | Bastia | | |
| 1983–1994 | → Aixoise (loan) | | |
| 1989–1992 | Libourne | | |
| 1993–1994 | Bastia | | |

Managerial career
- 2004–2005: Bastia (assistant)
- 2005: Bastia
- 2005–2008: Bastia (assistant)
- 2008–2009: Bastia (youth)
- 2009–2010: Bastia (assistant)
- 2009: → Bastia (caretaker)
- 2011–2012: AS Nebbiu
- 2012–2016: Troyes (assistant)
- 2018–2019: Brest (assistant)
- 2019–: Auxerre (assistant)
- * Club domestic league appearances and goals

Michel Padovani (born 21 January 1962) is a French football manager and former player who is the current assistant manager of AJ Auxerre. He played as a midfielder.
