= Léonce Lavagne =

French footballer (born 1940)

Personal information
- Date of birth: 17 February 1940 (age 86)
- Place of birth: Béziers, France
- Height: 1.79 m (5 ft 10 in)
- Position: Defender

Senior career*
Years	Team	Apps	(Gls)
1959–1969	Béziers Devèze		
1969–1971	Racing Club		
1971–1972	Rouen		
1972–1973	Le Havre		

Managerial career
- 1972–1974: Le Havre
- 1974–1976: Béziers Devèze
- 1976–1982: Le Havre
- 1983–1992: Alès
- 1992–1993: Nîmes
- 1993–1994: Bastia
- 1995–1998: Valence
- * Club domestic league appearances and goals

Léonce Lavagne (born 17 February 1940) is a French professional football player and later manager who played as a defender. He is the father of Denis Lavagne.
