= Charles Orlanducci =

French footballer (born 1951)

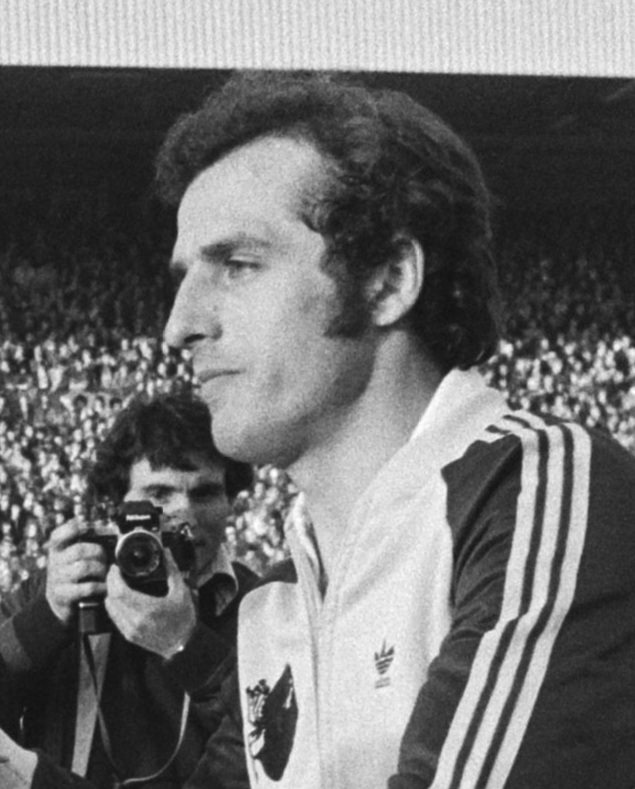
- Orlanducci in 1978

Personal information
- Date of birth: 28 October 1951 (age 75)
- Place of birth: Vescovato, Haute-Corse, France
- Position: Defender

Senior career*
Years	Team	Apps	(Gls)
1969–1987	SEC Bastia	429	(15)
1971–1972	→ Red Star Saint-Ouen (loan)	20	(0)
Total		449	(15)

International career
1975	France	1	(0)
- * Club domestic league appearances and goals

Charles Orlanducci (born 28 October 1951) is a French former professional footballer who played as a defender.
