= Roland Gransart =

French footballer and coach (born 1954)

Personal information
- Date of birth: 1 January 1954 (age 72)
- Place of birth: Marseille, France
- Height: 1.82 m (6 ft 0 in)
- Position: Defender

Youth career
- 1965–1967: Volontane Saint Pierre
- 1967–1974: Marseille

Senior career*
Years	Team	Apps	(Gls)
1974–1981	Marseille	78	(2)

Managerial career
- 1981–1984: Marseille
- 1986–1991: Bastia
- 1991–1998: Gueugnon
- 1998–2001: Cannes
- 2003: Martigues
- * Club domestic league appearances and goals

Roland Gransart (born 1 January 1954) is a French former footballer and coach. A defender, he played for Olympique de Marseille. After his playing career, he became a coach with Marseille, Bastia, Gueugnon, Cannes and Martigues. His father was Maurice Gransart.
