= 1967–68 French Division 2 =

29th season of the second-tier football league in France

Division 2
- Season: 1967–68

Statistics of Division 2 for the 1967–68 season.

== Overview ==
It was contested by 19 teams, and Bastia won the championship.

== League standings ==
Pos	Team	Pld	W	D	L	GF	GA	GD	Pts	Promotion or relegation
1	Bastia	34	21	8	5	53	22	+31	50	Promoted
2	Nîmes Olympique	34	16	12	6	52	24	+28	44	Promoted
3	Stade Reims	34	18	7	9	60	28	+32	43	
4	Avignon	34	19	5	10	69	48	+21	43	
5	Toulon	34	16	9	9	47	40	+7	41	
6	Grenoble	34	17	6	11	53	41	+12	40	
7	Angoulême	34	15	8	11	44	34	+10	38	
8	Bataillon Joinville	34	15	7	12	50	43	+7	37	
9	Lorient	34	12	13	9	33	31	+2	37	
10	Nancy	34	14	8	12	41	38	+3	36	
11	Dunkerque	34	9	12	13	39	42	−3	30	
12	Chaumont	34	11	8	15	55	65	−10	30	
13	Béziers	34	10	8	16	35	43	−8	28	
14	Limoges	34	9	8	17	38	55	−17	26	
15	Besançon	34	8	10	16	30	57	−27	26	
16	Montpellier	34	8	8	18	30	47	−17	24	
17	Cannes	34	5	11	18	29	64	−35	21	
18	US Boulogne	34	6	6	22	32	68	−36	18	
19	Stade Français	0	0	0	0	0	0	0	0	

Source: rsssf.com
