= SC Bastia =

Association football club in Furiani, France

Bastia
- Full name: Sporting Club Bastia
- Nicknames: I Turchini (The Blues), I Lioni di Furiani (The Lions of Furiani), Le Sporting (The Sporting), Les Bleus (The Blues)
- Short name: SCB
- Founded: 1905; 121 years ago as Football Club bastiais
- Stadium: Stade Armand-Cesari
- Capacity: 16,048
- President: Claude Ferrandi
- Head coach: Laurent Peyrelade
- League: Ligue 3
- 2025–26: Ligue 2, 17th of 18 (relegated)
- Website: www.sc-bastia.corsica
Home colours	Away colours	Third colours

Sporting Club Bastia (Corsican: Sporting Club di Bastia, commonly referred to as SC Bastia or simply Bastia; French: [bastja]) is a French professional football club based in Bastia on the island of Corsica. The club plays in Ligue 3, the third tier of French football, having won the 2020–21 Championnat National. The club plays its home matches at the Stade Armand Cesari located within the city. SC Bastia is known for its strong association with Corsican nationalism.

Bastia's main historical success include reaching the final of the 1977–78 edition of the UEFA Cup. The team was defeated by Dutch club PSV Eindhoven (0–0 at home, 0–3 away). Domestically, Bastia won the second division of French football in 1968 and 2012, and the Coupe de France in 1981. During the club's infancy, it was league champions of the "Corsican League" 17 times. They are the local rivals of Ajaccio and contest the Derby Corse.

The club has signed several famous players in its history, notably including Dragan Džajić, Claude Papi, Johnny Rep, Roger Milla, Michael Essien, Alex Song, Sébastien Squillaci, Jérôme Rothen, Antar Yahia and Florian Thauvin.

In 2017 the club was relegated to the Championnat National 3 due to financial irregularities and lost its professional licence. I Turchini regained professional status in 2021 following promotion to Ligue 2.

== History ==
=== Genesis of the team and beginning of professional football ===
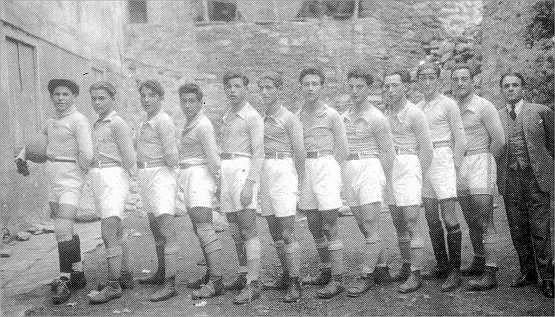
Sporting Club de Bastia in staff (1905)

Sporting Club de Bastia was founded in 1905 by a Swiss named Hans Ruesch. He taught German in high school in Bastia. The first president of Bastia was Emile Brandizi. The Corsican club celebrated its debut on the Place d'Armes of Bastia, in the light of a single gas burner.

The club began its professional journey in 1965, in Division 2. After three successful seasons, it was crowned Champion of France's Second Division in 1968, joining the elite. The first season was difficult, but the club still maintained its place. Thus began a decade widely considered the finest in club history. In 1972, the club reached, for the first time, the final of the Coupe de France against Olympique de Marseille (losing 2–1), getting it its first qualification in the European Cup Winners' Cup, which led to elimination against the excellent team of Atlético Madrid.

=== UEFA Cup finalist in 1978 and Cup victory in France in 1981 ===
In 1977, Bastia finished third in the Division 1 with the best offence in the league, and qualified for the UEFA Cup.

This is the beginning of the team built around playmaker Claude Papi, which was composed of many talented players such as Johnny Rep of the Netherlands; Jean-François Larios, a midfielder and French international; and Charles Orlanducci, the solid libero nicknamed the "Lion of Vescovato".

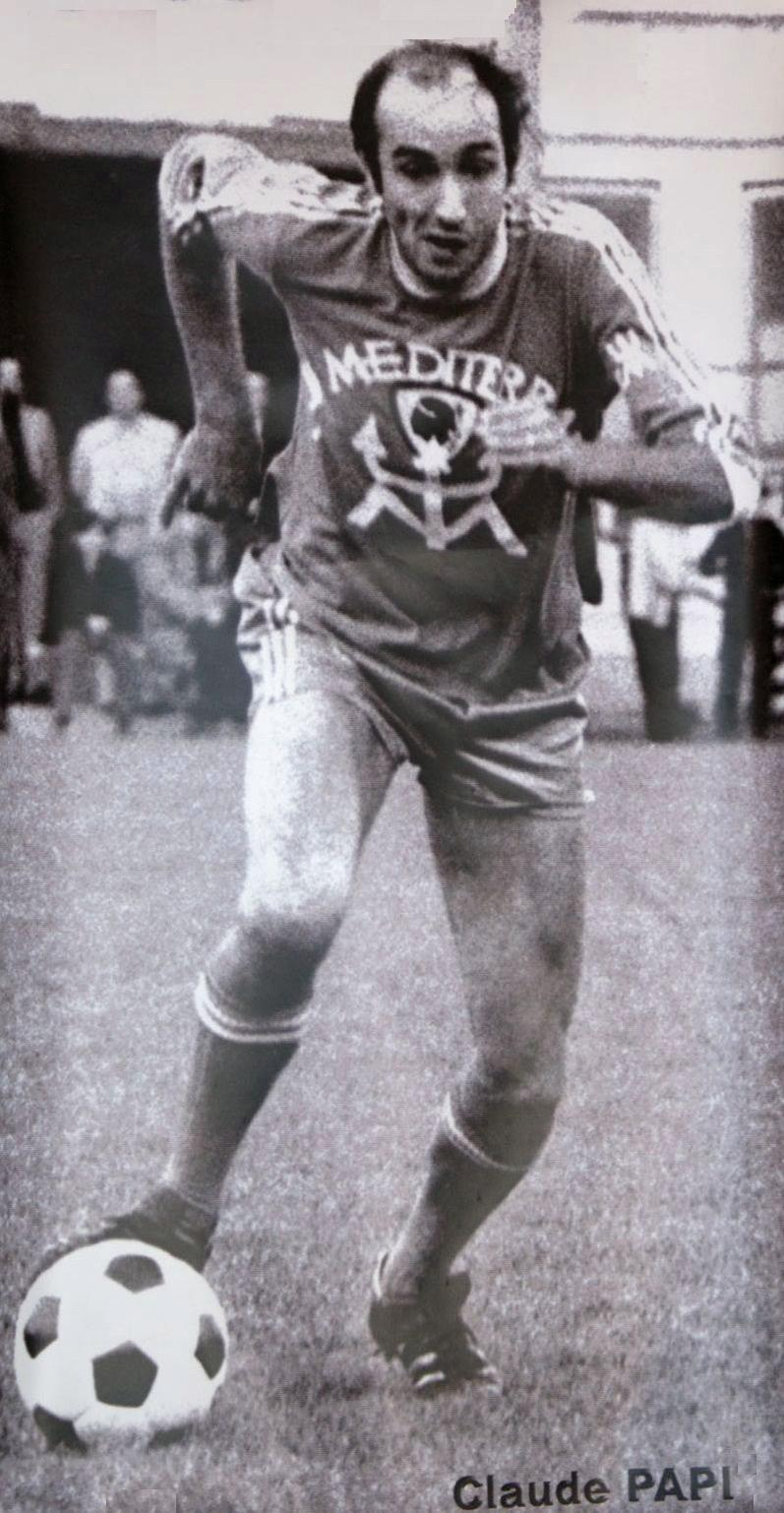
Claude Papi, 1978.

The team eliminated successively Sporting Lisbon, Newcastle United, Torino, Carl Zeiss Jena and Grasshoppers Zurich before a final defeat to PSV Eindhoven (0–0, 0–3). Of all the victories, the 3–2 win in Turin made the most lasting impression, the "Toro" being undefeated for two seasons on their home pitch. It is also during this match that Bastia marks the best goal of that time, a volley from 22 meters by Jean-François Larios.

The final would, however, end with misfortune. First, with a first leg played at Furiani on an unplayable pitch, heavy rain having fallen on Corsica on 26 April 1978. Unfortunately, the Yugoslav referee postponed the meeting because of the proximity to World Cup in Argentina that was scheduled a few weeks later. Despite Bastia's dominance, the meeting ended with a goalless draw, 0–0. The final return, 9 May, lasted only 24 minutes. This is the time it took PSV Eindhoven to score the first goal, followed by two more late in the game (3–0). The townsfolk will attribute the defeat of Bastia to fatigue accumulated in the league (3 games in 6 days in the days before the final return) and also the rain-soaked pitch in the first leg at Furiani.

Three years after that final, the Bastia won its first trophy with the Coupe de France 1980–81. This was a prestigious victory for the Corsican club facing St. Etienne of Michel Platini. The final was played at Parc des Princes in front of more than 46,000 spectators, including the newly elected President of the Republic, François Mitterrand.

=== Descent in Division 2, Furiani disaster, and takeover by the FLNC-Canal Historique ===
After 18 years in the elite, the club went down to the second division at the end of the 1985–86 season, and stayed for eight years.

SC Bastia, alongside rival club AC Ajaccio, played a central role in the early period of the "Years of Lead", a period of turbulent infighting in the 1990s during the Corsican conflict. AC Ajaccio had been taken over by members of the FLNC-Canal Habituel, and the rival FLNC-Canal Historique, the largest guerrilla group present in Corsica known for its militaristic platform, was looking to expand their influence and income in a similar fashion. Historiques had more influence than Habituels in Bastia and had also hoped to gain further grassroots support via the football team. Thus, they approached Jean-François Filippi, president of SC Bastia at the time, who hired Historiques as bodyguards and even placed Jean-Martin Verdi, a Historique militant and high-ranking member of the Historique's A Cuncolta Naziunalista party, in the position of treasurer and later general secretary.

This era is marked by the catastrophe of Furiani: In the 1991–92 season, the club reached the semi-finals of the Coupe de France. The match was played at Stade Armand Cesari, or "Furiani Stadium", against Olympique de Marseille which dominated the Championship of France. The enthusiasm was such that was decided to hastily construct a temporary stand of 10,000 seats. The upper part of the platform collapsed a few minutes before kick-off killing 18 and injuring 2,300. Filippi received a large amount of public scrutiny for the incident, and was largely held responsible for the disaster. However, Filippi was given defense and legal protection by the FLNC-Canal Historique. Robert Sozzi, a Historique, refused to protect Filippi, and this is cited as a possible reason for his assassination by other Historiques in 1993. Historiques are also implicated in the disappearance of Pierre Bianconi, known for his support for Alain Orsoni, leader of the FLNC-Canal Habituel, which was engaged in a harsh internal war with the Historiques at the time. Filippi was himself assassinated by Habituels in 1994.

Filippi was replaced as president of SC Bastia by François Nicolai, a member of the FLNC-Canal Historique, who worked alongside his brother Jean Nicolai and Jean-Martin Verdi, both of whom were also FLNC members. The Nicolai brothers were arrested and interrogated in 2005 by French police, where they claimed to be subject to torture at the hands of French authorities. The Nicolai brothers during their presidency were, according to police and their own testimonies, working under Charles Pieri, the leader of the FLNC-Canal Historique and SC Bastia's "de facto" president. He accompanied SC Bastia's executive on away games and even personally oversaw the transfer of Michael Essien to Lyon in 2003.

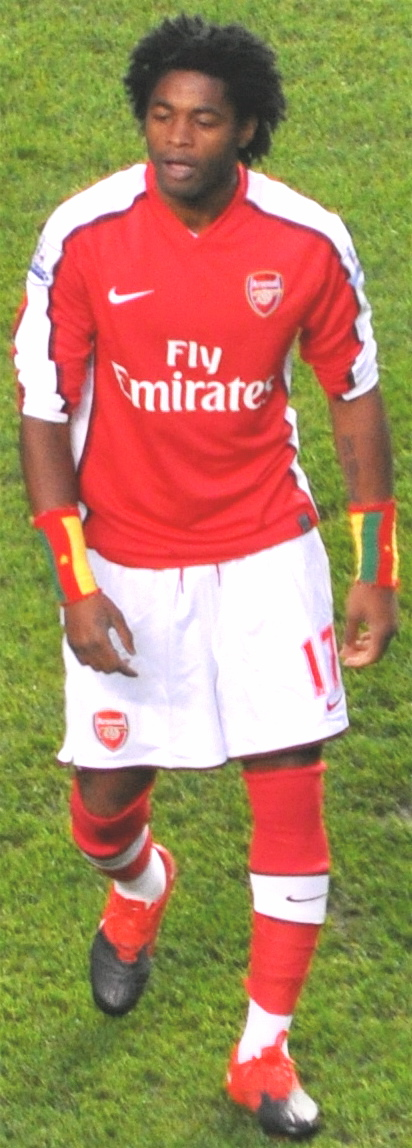
Alex Song, made his professional debut in 2004 for Bastia.

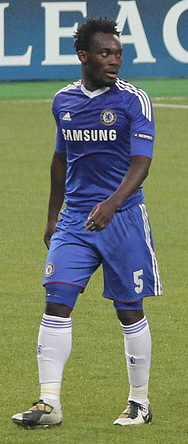
Michael Essien, made his professional debut in 2000 for Bastia.

=== Return to Ligue 1 and in the European Cup ===
The club returned to the elite for the 1994–95 season and that year reached the final of the League Cup. This era was marked by the work of Frédéric Antonetti, who coached the club between 1990 and 1994 and oversaw the development of new talents (Morlaye Soumah, Laurent Casanova, and Cyril Rool).

Antonetti coached the first team from 1994 to 2001 (with an interlude in 1998–99) and was involved in the recruitment of players such as Lubomir Moravcik, Pierre-Yves André, Frédéric Née, Franck Jurietti, and Anto Drobnjak, the latter of whom was the club's top scorer in his third season. At the end of the 1995–96 season, Drobnjak was also second in the Championship scoring charts with 20 goals, one goal behind top scorer Sonny Anderson.

In the 1996–97 season the club finished in 7th place in Ligue 1, just 3 points off bronze position, thus qualifying for the Intertoto Cup. The club won the Intertoto Cup, and qualified for the UEFA Cup for the 1997–98 season. Bastia eliminated Benfica in the round of 32 before falling to Steaua Bucharest in the next round. This defeat left a bitter taste due to the domination Bastia had in both matches. The performance of Bastia in the league in the following years allowed it to qualify two more times for the Intertoto Cup, in 1998 and 2001, but failed to re-qualify for the UEFA Cup.

After the departure of Antonetti in 2001, the club would not finish in the top ten again. They did reach the final of the Coupe de France in 2001–02; in their midfield was Michael Essien, who would go on to play for Lyon and Chelsea. Another player groomed by Bastia was defender Alex Song, who later played for Arsenal and Barcelona.

Between 2002 and 2005, Bastia was managed by Robert Nouzaret, Gerard Gili, François Ciccolini, and lastly the duo of Michel Padovani and Eric Durand. Each failed to take the team to the top ten, the final league placing actually falling each year (see Section championship history), despite the first team featuring the likes of Tony Vairelles, Florian Maurice, Franck Silvestre, Lilian Laslandes (all internationals) and Cyril Jeunechamp.

In the winter break of the 2004–05 season, the club fell into the relegation zone. Bastia recruited Christian Karembeu, member of the 1998 World Cup-winning France team, but Bastia would still be relegated to Ligue 2 at the end of the season after 11 consecutive years in Ligue 1.

=== The Descent Below ===
In 2005, the club was relegated to Ligue 2. Five years later, Bastia was in serious danger of descent into the Championnat National. Bastia was officially relegated to the National on 7 May 2010, following a draw (0–0) with Tours at the 37th matchday of Ligue 2.

On 6 July 2010, the club was administratively relegated to Championnat de France amateur by the Direction Nationale du Contrôle de Gestion (DNCG). The club actually had a deficit of €1.2 million, which was filled by grants from local governments (Territorial Community of Corsica, the General Council of Haute-Corse). On 23 July 2010, the Federal Council of the French Football Federation authorised Bastia to play in the 2010–11 season, as requested by the National Olympic Committee and French sports (CNOSF) after the DNCG had refused.

Despite this disrupted pre-season, Bastia performed well in the transfer window, with no fewer than six rookies. As for departures, there is mainly the transfer of Florent Ghisolfi (Reims) and Christophe Gaffory (Vannes) as well as Pierre-Yves André who decided to end his career.

=== The rise in Ligue 2 ===
Faruk Hadžibegić was fired from the managers' post after poor results, and the job then passed to Frédéric Hantz. On 22 April 2011, Bastia officially earned its place in Ligue 2 after a game against Frejus-Saint Raphael. No fewer than 500 townsfolk had made the trip. On 7 May 2011, Bastia become the National champion, following a victory over Créteil by 2 goals to one, with Bastia finishing with a record tally of 91 points and unbeaten at home throughout the campaign. Sporting was leading at the half, but equalised by David Suarez, then Idrissa Sylla allowed Bastia to take the lead in the 92nd minute in a crazy atmosphere. At the end of the match, the pitch at Armand Cesari was invaded by Bastia fans, happy to celebrate with their players and their coach, Frédéric Hantz, this new title.

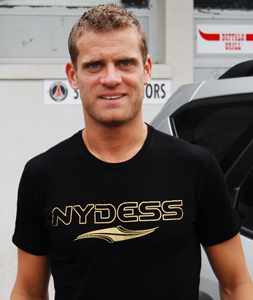
Jérôme Rothen won Ligue 2's best player award in 2011–12, the same season Bastia were named team of the year and earned promotion to Ligue 1.

=== Return to Ligue 1 ===
Bastia, newly promoted from the National, welcomed Jérôme Rothen, Toifilou Maoulida, François Marque, Ludovic Genest and Florian Thauvin into the club. Bastia started off on a good note, falling off slightly in the autumn. From early February until the beginning of April, Bastia did not lose a single match. On 23 April 2012, in a full Stadium Armand Cesari, Bastia virtually secured their place amongst the elite by winning against Châteauroux (2–1). On 1 May 2012, Bastia became champion of Ligue 2, 44 years after its first and only league title, with their victory over Metz at Armand Cesari. On 11 May 2012, Bastia won its last game of the season at home 2–1 against Nantes thanks to goals from Jérôme Rothen and David Suarez. The club was also on a 2-year run of being undefeated at home. Bastia became part of the very exclusive club of teams undefeated at home in Europe. Several players played their last game against Nantes in the colours of Bastia, including David Suarez and Jacques-Désiré Périatambée.

Bastia won all the trophies UNFP for Ligue 2: Jérôme Rothen, best player; Macedo Novaes, best goalkeeper; and Frédéric Hantz, best coach, who placed five players in the team line-up (Macedo Novaes, Féthi Harek, Wahbi Khazri, Sadio Diallo and Jérôme Rothen).

In the 2016–17 Ligue 1 season, after four seasons in the top division, Bastia finished bottom of the Ligue 1 table and were relegated to Ligue 2.

=== Sharp fall, financial troubles and climb back to professional football ===
On 22 June 2017, Bastia were relegated again to Championnat National after the DNCG had recommended a further demotion for the club. Bastia were the subject of an audit on their books which resulted in yet another demotion for failing to guarantee they had the finances to compete in Ligue 2. The DNCG released a statement on the same day stating “Following its audit today before the DNCG, Sporting Club Bastia has been given notice of a provisional relegation". In August 2017 following bankruptcy proceedings, the clubs professional section was liquidated. The club was taken over by local entrepreneurs Claude Ferrandi (Ferrandi Group) and Pierre-Noël Luiggi (Oscaro group). Following the takeover, the club restarted with its prior reserve team in Championnat National 3. After a difficult first season in National 3, the club would embark on a series of back-to-back promotions, starting with promotion to the Championnat National 2 in the 2018–19 season, and then to the Championnat National in the 2019–20 season, by being top of the National 2 Group A table when the season was curtailed due to the COVID-19 pandemic. Bastia achieved their third successive promotion after being crowned champion of the 2020–21 Championnat National.

=== Creation of a cooperative structure ===
At the beginning of the 2019-2020 Championnat National 2, the club announced the creation of a cooperative structure, under the form of a Société coopérative d'intérêt collectif, which allows anyone identifying in different types of supporter categories to invest and hold shares in the club. The voting rights structure and board is divided into four colleges:

- Founders (Ferrandi and Luiggi families) - 38% voting rights and 4 board seats
- Economic actors (businesses and organizations) - 22% voting rights and 2 board seats
- Supporters - 20% voting rights and 2 board seats
- Employees and prior employees (players, staff and administrative personnel) - 10% voting rights and 1 board seat
- Public entities (Regional and municipal authorities) - 10% voting rights
- SC Bastia Association - 1 board seat

This structure allows the club to involve any type of supporter into the clubs decision-making, in a transparent structure.

=== Return to professional football ===
SC Bastia returned to professional football for the first time since its bankruptcy in 2017, playing in the 2021–22 Ligue 2. After a difficult start to the season which would result in the sacking of manager Mathieu Chabert on September 22, following a 2–1 defeat away to Valenciennes, with Bastia 18th in the table, just before the derby against AC Ajaccio. The club would then announce the hiring of Régis Brouard on October 2, 2021. The club would go on to a comfortable mid-table finish in 12th.

The following season, the club would go on to an up-and-down first half of season, before an extremely strong second half that would see Regis Brouard guide the club to a 4th-place finish, having for a long time looked towards promotion in a three-way fight with Bordeaux and Metz. During the summer break, expectations were high and the fans wanted to see the club fight for promotion. The club would go on to have a difficult first half of the season, being 15th at the halfway point. In a repeat of the previous sacking, coach Regis Brouard would be sacked following a 3–1 defeat away to Valenciennes and just before the derby against Ajaccio on January 29. Reserve team coach Michel Moretti and assistant coach Lillian Laslandes were brought on as caretaker coaches until the end of the season, guiding the team to a 13th-place finish.

The club announced the arrival and return of Frédéric Antonetti as Technical Director on March 26, 2024, with the responsibility of overseeing the sporting policy of the first team as well as the youth and reserve teams. Benoit Tavenot would then be named first team coach on June 5, also returning to SC Bastia for the 2024–25 Ligue 2 season.

== Stadium ==
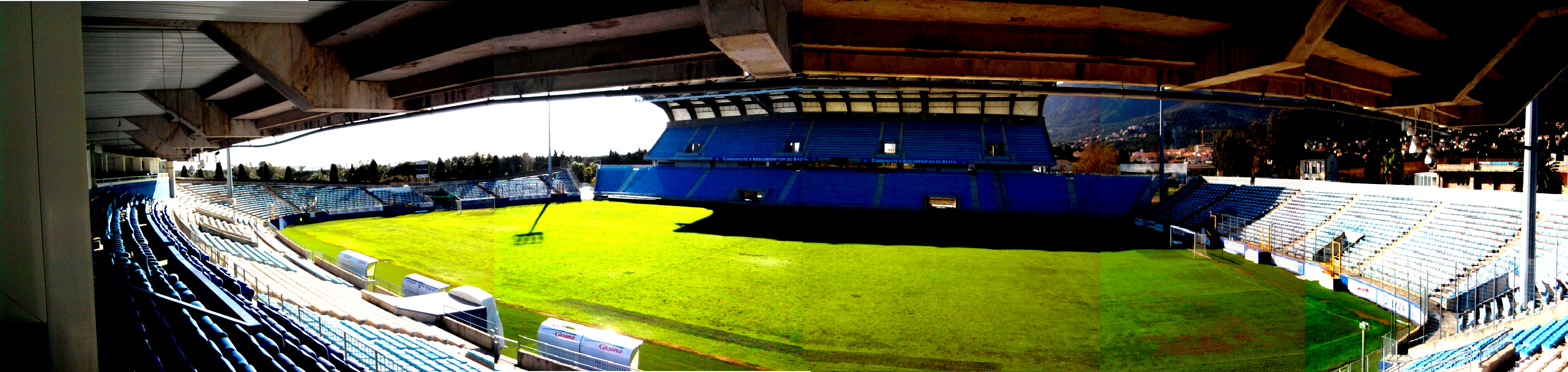
Stade Armand Cesari.

Stade Armand Cesari, also known as Stade Furiani, is the main football stadium in Corsica. It is located in Furiani, and is used by SC Bastia. In 1992, the stadium hosted the semi-finals of the Coupe de France during which a temporary grandstand collapsed, killing 18 people and injuring nearly 3,000.

Totally obsolete and even dangerous (barbed wire around the ground, dilapidated stands), the stadium hosted the 1978 UEFA Cup Final. The stadium's capacity was then less than 12,000 seats, in precarious conditions, heavy rain having fallen on Corsica that day, turning the ground into a quagmire, which handicapped the outcome of this decisive match (0–0). The crowd of 15,000 spectators announced appears exaggerated, but given the fervor not hesitate to stand up, packed tightly, to attend the game. The record attendance at the stadium was set on 1 September 2012, when 15,505 people saw Bastia lose against St. Etienne (0–3) in a league match. Behind it the following record was set in 1978, when 15,000 people saw Bastia draw against PSV Eindhoven (0–0, 1978) in the UEFA Cup final matches.

== Logos ==
Logo used from 2011 to 2024

Current logo

== Colours and badge ==
For the 2011–12 season, the club decided to change the logo. This is the explanation; "1- Replacing the name "SCB". Spoken in the aisles of Armand Cesari since its inception. "Bastia" is the club of the city. 2- To recall the historic jersey from 1978, the shield has a moor's head, from the Testa Mora Flag. 3- It also reappeared as in the 70s and the heyday of the club. 4- The dominant color is blue. Always accompanied by white edging and black as official colours of the club since 1992."

== Supporters ==
Bastia has a large number of supporters among Corsicans, and their supporters frequently display elements of Corsican nationalism, such as the frequent use of the local language and symbols, and support for the island's independence. The fans are known as the Turchini, meaning "Blues" in Corsican.

The fans have a rivalry with most mainland supporters, however, their most fierce rivals are Nice with whom they contest the Derby de la Mediterranée, although the derby can also refer to rivalries with Marseille and Monaco. They also have a rivalry with Parisian club PSG due to political tensions between the capital and Corsica.

The other large rivalry is the Corsican derby with fellow islanders AC Ajaccio, and to a lesser extent Gazélec Ajaccio, with whom they compete over the dominance of the island.

== Friendships ==
Since 2004, the Bastia ultras have maintained a relationship of friendship and respect with the Nuova Guardia, the historic Torres ultras group.

== Honours ==
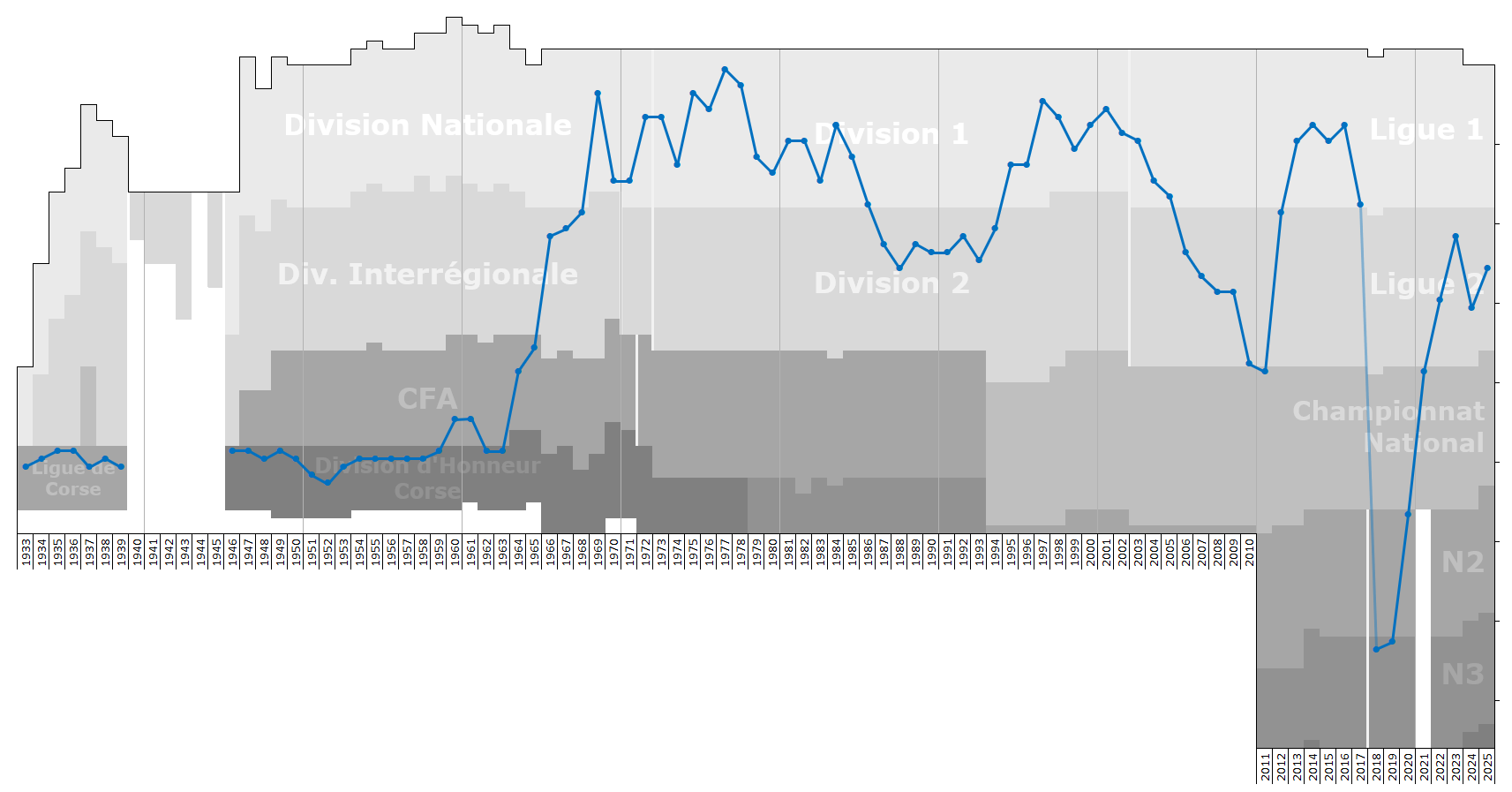
Historical league performance chart of SC Bastia

=== Domestic ===
- Ligue 2
  - Winners: 1967–68, 2011–12
- Championnat National
  - Winners: 2010–11, 2020–21
- Coupe de France
  - Winners: 1980–81
  - Runners-up: 1971–72, 2001–02
- Coupe de la Ligue
  - Runners-up: 1994–95, 2014–15
- Trophée des champions
  - Winners: 1972
- Corsica Championship
  - Winners (17): 1922, 1927, 1928, 1929, 1930, 1931, 1932, 1935, 1936, 1942, 1943, 1946, 1947, 1949, 1959, 1962, 1963

=== Continental ===
- UEFA Cup
  - Runners-up: 1977–78
- Intertoto Cup
  - Champions: 1997

== Players ==
=== Current squad ===
As of 15 September 2026.

Note: Flags indicate national team as defined under FIFA eligibility rules; some limited exceptions apply. Players may hold more than one non-FIFA nationality.

No.	Pos.	Nation	Player
1	GK	MTQ	Théo De Percin (on loan from Auxerre)
2	DF	FRA	Noah Zilliox
3	MF	MLI	Hamidou Makalou (on loan from Brest)
4	DF	FRA	Anthony Roncaglia
6	MF	SEN	Fallou Fall
7	FW	FRA	Clément Rodrigues
9	FW	FRA	Félix Tomi
10	MF	CIV	Alexandre Zaouai
11	FW	FRA	Maxime Blé
12	MF	FRA	Lakhdar Belal
13	MF	FRA	Cléo Mélières (on loan from Metz)
14	FW	SEN	Daouda Tamba

No.	Pos.	Nation	Player
16	GK	FRA	Sacha Contena
17	MF	FRA	Joachim Eickmayer
19	FW	FRA	Ruben Beliandjou
20	DF	TOG	Gustave Akueson
21	DF	FRA	Nassim Douce Boumaza
22	DF	FRA	Isaac Monnier (on loan from Lorient)
23	MF	THA	Erawan Garnier
25	MF	MLI	Dramane Diarra
28	MF	FRA	Matteo Petrignani
29	FW	FRA	Mohamed Boumaaoui
30	GK	FRA	Luca Pausé
34	DF	CIV	David Djédjé

=== Out on loan ===
Note: Flags indicate national team as defined under FIFA eligibility rules; some limited exceptions apply. Players may hold more than one non-FIFA nationality.

No. / Pos. / Nation / Player; — / MF / FRA / Yahya Bathily (on loan to Borgo)	No. / Pos. / Nation / Player; — / FW / MTQ / Jérémy Sebas (on loan to Pau)

=== Appearances ===
Pos.	Name	Total matches	Total matches in D1/L1
1.	Charles Orlanducci	507	410
2.	Claude Papi	479	382
3.	Paul Marchioni	332	227
4.	Pierre-Yves André	330	134
5.	Jean-Louis Cazes	329	276
6.	Yannick Cahuzac	324	121
7.	Morlaye Soumah	276	211
8.	Georges Franceschetti	276	236
9.	Simei Ihily	255	219
10.	André Burkhard	250	217

Last update: 7 March 2017.
Note: **Bold** represents current players.

=== Top scorers ===
Pos.	Name	Total goals	Total goals in D1/L1
1.	Claude Papi	134	110
2.	Pierre-Yves André	102	84
3.	François Félix	78	63
4.	Marc-Kanyan Case	59	53
5.	Jacques Zimako	57	53
6.	Anto Drobnjak	56	50
7.	Frédéric Née	54	45
8.	Louis Marcialis	48	39
9.	Jean-Pierre Serra	45	37
10.	Thierry Meyer	40	17

=== French internationals ===
Pos.	Name	Total caps	Year
1.	Claude Papi	3	1973–1978
2.	Jacques Zimako	2	1977
3.	Charles Orlanducci	1	1975
=	Pierrick Hiard	1	1981
=	Frédéric Née	1	2001

== Coaching staff ==
Position	Name
Manager	(France) Laurent Peyrelade
Assistant Managers	(France) Michel Moretti (France) Lilian Laslandes
Goalkeeper Coach	(France) Dominique Agostini
Fitness Coaches	(France) Jean Akakpo (France) Tom Le Rhun
Video Analyst	(France) Hugo Hantz
Doctors	(France) Francois Brochet (France) Roger Laurenzi
Physiotherapists	(France) Lise Betton (France) Stephane Viale
Osteopath	(Italy) Jean-Christophe Guidicell

== Coaches ==
- (France) (Algeria) Boumedienne Abderrhamane (1957 – 1961)
- (France) François Fassone (1961 – 1963)
- (Hungary) Gyula Nagy (1963 – 1964)
- (France) André Strappe (1964 – 1965)
- (Hungary) Gyula Nagy (1965 – 1966)
- (France) Lucien Jasseron (1966 – 1969)
- (Algeria) Rachid Mekhloufi (1969)
- (France) Edmond Delfour and (Algeria) Rachid Mekhloufi (1969 – 1970)
- (France) Edmond Delfour (1970)
- (Hungary) Gyula Nagy (1970 – 1971)
- (France) Jean Vincent (28 February 1971 – 31 October 1971)
- (France) Pierre Cahuzac (1 November 1971 – 1979)
- (France) Jean-Pierre Destrumelle (1979 – 1980)
- (France) Antoine Redin (1980 – 1985)
- (France) Alain Moizan (31 August 1985 – 30 November 1985)
- (France) Antoine Redin (1 December 1985 – 1986)
- (France) Roland Gransart (1986 – 1991)
- (France) René Exbrayat (1991 – 1992)
- (France) Léonce Lavagne (1992 – 1994)
- (Corsica) (France) Frédéric Antonetti (2 October 1994 – 1998)
- (Poland) Henryk Kasperczak (1998 – 18 October 1998)
- (France) Laurent Fournier (19 October 1998 – 15 April 1999)
- (Corsica) (France) José Pasqualetti (15 April 1999 – 30 June 1999)
- (Corsica) (France) Frédéric Antonetti (1 July 1999 – 30 June 2001)
- (France) Robert Nouzaret (1 July 2001 – 30 June 2002)
- (France) Gérard Gili (1 July 2002 – 30 June 2004)
- (Corsica) (France) François Ciccolini (1 July 2004 – 15 April 2005)
- (France) Éric Durand and (Corsica) (France) Michel Padovani (15 April 2005 – 30 June 2005)
- (France) Bernard Casoni (1 July 2005 – 30 June 2009)
- (France) Philippe Anziani (1 July 2009 – 25 November 2009)
- (Corsica) (France) Michel Padovani (25 November 2009 – 8 December 2009)
- (Bosnia and Herzegovina) Faruk Hadžibegić (8 December 2009 – 30 June 2010)
- (France) Frédéric Hantz (1 July 2010 – 17 May 2014)
- (France) Claude Makélélé (24 May 2014 – 3 November 2014)
- (France) Ghislain Printant (3 November 2014 – 28 January 2016)
- (Corsica) (France) François Ciccolini (28 January 2016 – 27 February 2017)
- (Portugal) Rui Almeida (27 February 2017 – 26 June 2017)
- (France) Réginald Ray (26 June 2017 – 17 August 2017)
- (Corsica) (France) Stéphane Rossi (17 August 2017 – 23 October 2019)
- (France) Frédéric Née (interim) (24 October 2019 – 28 October 2019)
- (France) Mathieu Chabert (28 October 2019 – 22 September 2021)
- (France) Cyril Jeunechamp and (France) Frédéric Zago (interim) (22 September – 2 October 2021)
- (France) Régis Brouard (2 October 2021 - 29 January 2024)
- (Corsica) (France) Michel Moretti and (France) Lilian Laslandes (29 January 2024 - 5 June 2024)
- (Corsica) (France) Benoît Tavenot (5 June 2024 - 30 October 2025)
- (France) Réginald Ray (15 November 2025 – 12 May 2026)
- (France) Laurent Peyrelade (1 July 2026 – present)
