= Frédéric Hantz =

French footballer and manager (born 1966)

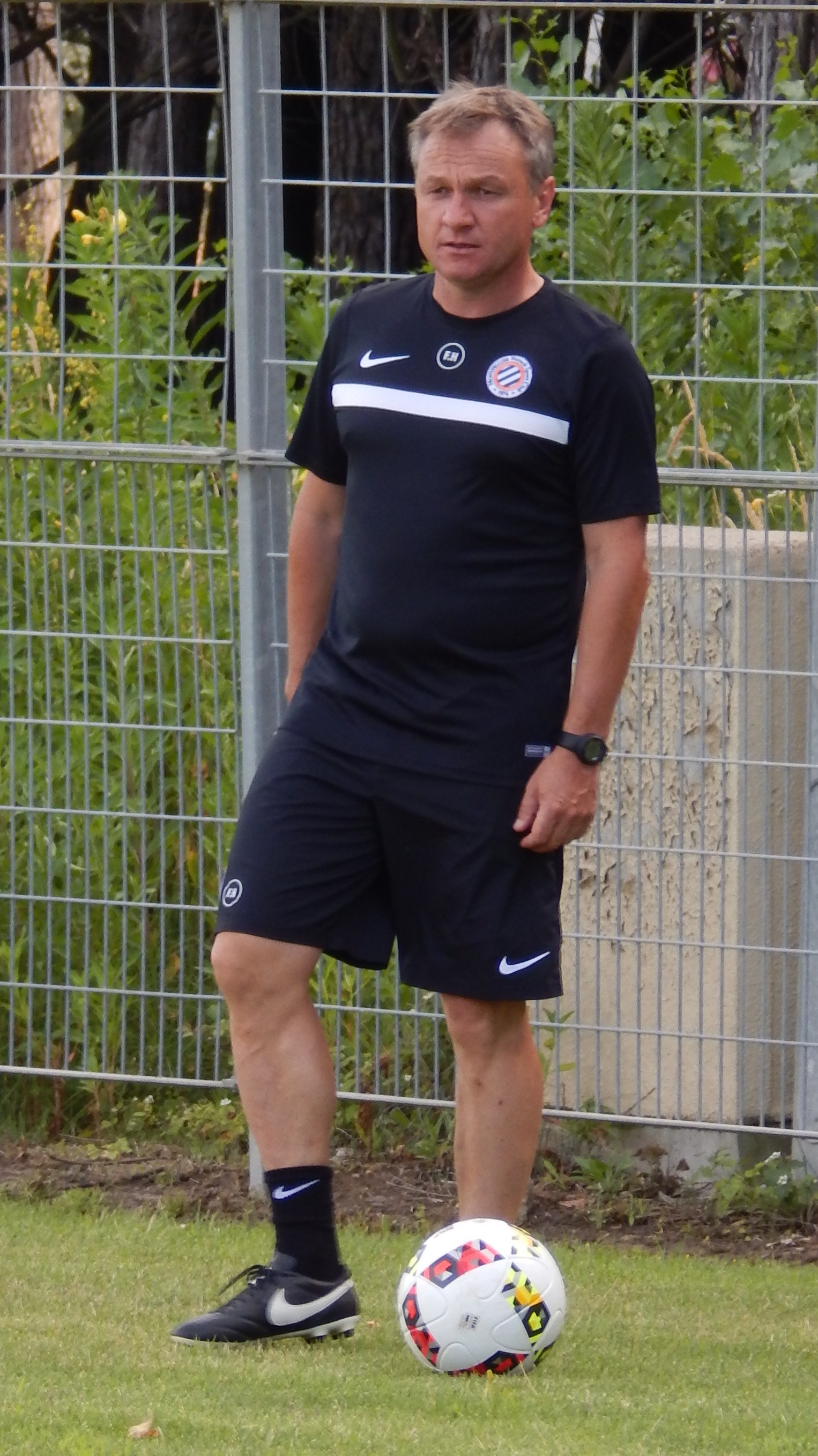
- Hantz as Montpellier manager in 2016

Personal information
- Date of birth: 30 May 1966 (age 60)
- Place of birth: Rodez, France
- Height: 1.78 m (5 ft 10 in)
- Position: Midfielder

Youth career
- 1980–1982: Rodez

Senior career*
Years	Team	Apps	(Gls)
1982–1987	Rodez	61	(2)
1987–1988	Aurillac		
1988–1989	Clermont	25	(2)
1989–1992	Istres	86	(9)
1992–1993	Metz	28	(0)
1993–1995	Nice	71	(5)
1995–1997	Niort	25	(2)
1997–1998	Rodez	22	(2)

Managerial career
- 1998–2001: Rodez
- 2002–2004: ESA Brive
- 2004–2007: Le Mans
- 2007: Sochaux
- 2008–2009: Le Havre
- 2010–2014: Bastia
- 2016–2017: Montpellier
- 2017–2018: Metz
- 2020: Al-Khor
- * Club domestic league appearances and goals

Frédéric Hantz (born 30 May 1966) is a French professional football manager and former player who played as a midfielder.

== Managerial career ==
Hantz formerly managed Sochaux, who had a playing career before coaching. On 18 December, he was named as new head coach by Le Havre and was released after the end of his contract on 30 June 2010.

On 20 May 2010, Hantz replaced Faruk Hadžibegić as SC Bastia coach.

In January 2016, Hantz replaced the duo of Pascal Baills and Bruno Martini as Montpellier coach. He succeeded in his mission of keeping the club in Ligue 1, with Montpellier ending the season ranking 12th for the 2015–16 season.

In January 2017, following a difficult start to the second part of the season, the hardcore supporters of Montpellier, Butte Paillade 91, demonstrated their support for Hantz by showing up at the team's training with slogans in support of the coach and speaking out in his favour.

On 30 January 2017, he was replaced as Montpellier coach by former Paris Saint-Germain assistant coach and France national team assistant coach Jean-Louis Gasset, and former Bastia coach Ghislain Printant.

== Managerial statistics ==
As of match played 19 May 2018

Managerial record by team and tenure
Team	From	To	Record					Ref.
Team	From	To	P	W	D	L	Win %	Ref.
Rodez	1 July 1998	1 July 2001	107	38	28	41	35.51	
ESA Brive	1 July 2002	1 July 2004	75	26	22	27	34.67	
Le Mans	13 December 2004	2 June 2007	108	42	34	32	38.89	
Sochaux	2 June 2007	12 December 2007	21	3	7	11	14.29	
Le Havre	18 December 2008	31 May 2009	23	5	2	16	21.74	
Bastia	22 May 2010	22 May 2014	174	84	38	52	48.28	
Montpellier	26 January 2016	30 January 2017	41	14	11	16	34.15	
Metz	28 October 2017	20 May 2018	31	6	10	15	19.35	
Al-Khor	1 October 2020	25 December 2020	13	4	2	7	30.77	
Total			593	222	154	217	37.44	

== Honours ==
Bastia

- Ligue 2: 2011–12
- Championnat National: 2010–11

Individual

- Ligue 2 Manager of the Year: 2011–12
