= Antoine Redin =

French footballer (1934–2012)

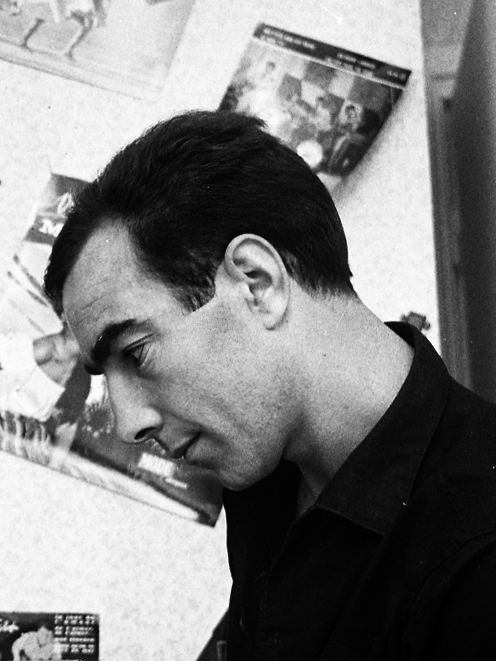
- Redin in 1962

Personal information
- Full name: Jean-Antoine Redin
- Date of birth: 4 September 1934
- Place of birth: Cenon, France
- Date of death: 27 August 2012 (aged 77)
- Place of death: Bastia, France
- Position: Defender

Senior career*
Years	Team	Apps	(Gls)
1954–1960	Nancy		
1960–1967	Toulouse		
1967–1974	Nancy	87	(1)

Managerial career
- 1970–1980: Nancy
- 1980–1985: Bastia
- 1986: Bastia
- * Club domestic league appearances and goals

Antoine Redin (4 September 1934 – 27 August 2012) was a French football player and manager. He played for FC Nancy, Toulouse and AS Nancy. He coached AS Nancy and Bastia.
