= Ghislain Printant =

French football manager (born 1961)

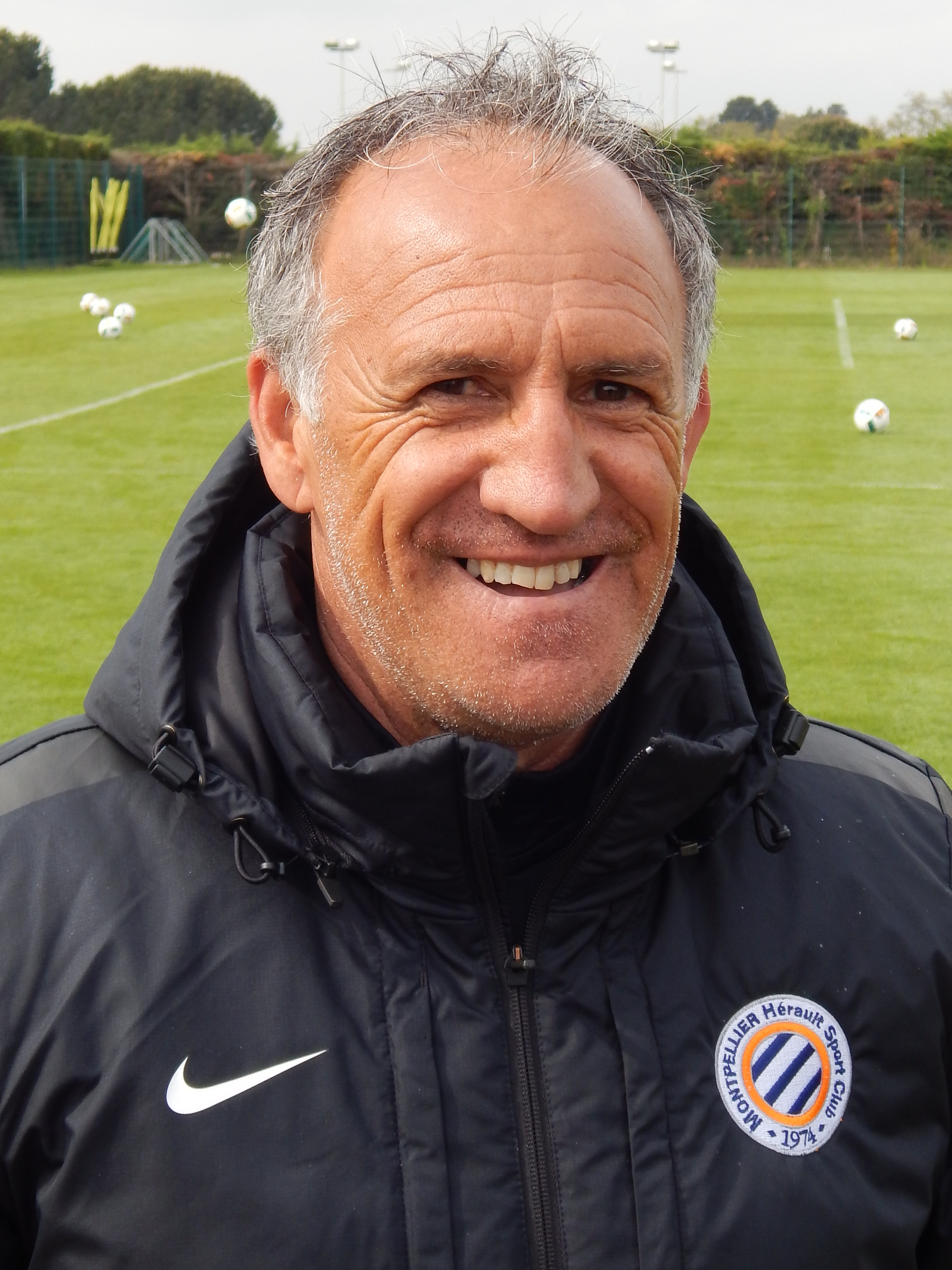
- Printant in 2017

Personal information
- Date of birth: 13 May 1961 (age 65)
- Place of birth: Montpellier, France
- Position: Goalkeeper

Team information
- Current team: Montpellier (assistant)

Youth career
- 1971–1975: ASPTT Montpellier
- 1975–1980: Montpellier

Senior career*
| Years | Team | Apps | (Gls) |
| 1980–1982 | Montpellier B | | |
| 1982–1989 | PI Vendargues | | |

Managerial career
- 1989–1992: Montpellier (GK coach)
- 1992–1994: Marvejols
- 1994–2004: Montpellier (assistant)
- 2004–2006: Montpellier U16
- 2006–2010: Montpellier B
- 2010–2014: Bastia (head of youth development)
- 2014–2016: Bastia
- 2017: Montpellier (assistant)
- 2017–2019: Saint-Étienne (assistant)
- 2019: Saint-Étienne
- 2020–2021: Bordeaux (assistant)
- 2022–2024: Ivory Coast (assistant)
- 2024: Marseille (assistant)
- 2025–: Montpellier (assistant)
- * Club domestic league appearances and goals

Ghislain Printant (born 13 May 1961) is a French football coach and former player who is the assistant head coach of Ligue 1 club Montpellier. He played as a goalkeeper.

== Managerial career ==
On 30 January 2017, Printant was hired as an assistant coach for Jean-Louis Gasset at Saint-Étienne. After Gasset announced his retirement 2019, Printant was named as the manager. He was sacked eight games into the season, with Saint-Étienne in the relegation zone.

Printant was the assistant coach of the Ivory Coast under Jean-Louis Gasset. Leading the team in the 2023 Africa Cup of Nations (held in 2024 on home soil), the duo was sacked after finishing third in Group A.

== Managerial statistics ==
| Team | From | To | Record | | | | |
| Team | From | To | G | W | D | L | Win % |
|---|---|---|---|---|---|---|---|
| (France) Montpellier B | 1 July 2006 | 30 June 2010 | 136 | 44 | 40 | 52 | 32.35 |
| (France) Bastia | 4 November 2014 | 28 January 2016 | 57 | 21 | 13 | 23 | 36.84 |
| (France) Saint-Étienne | 6 June 2019 | 4 October 2019 | 10 | 2 | 2 | 6 | 20.00 |
| Total | | | 203 | 67 | 55 | 81 | 33.00 |
