= 1977–78 UEFA Cup =

7th season of Europe's secondary club football tournament organised by UEFA

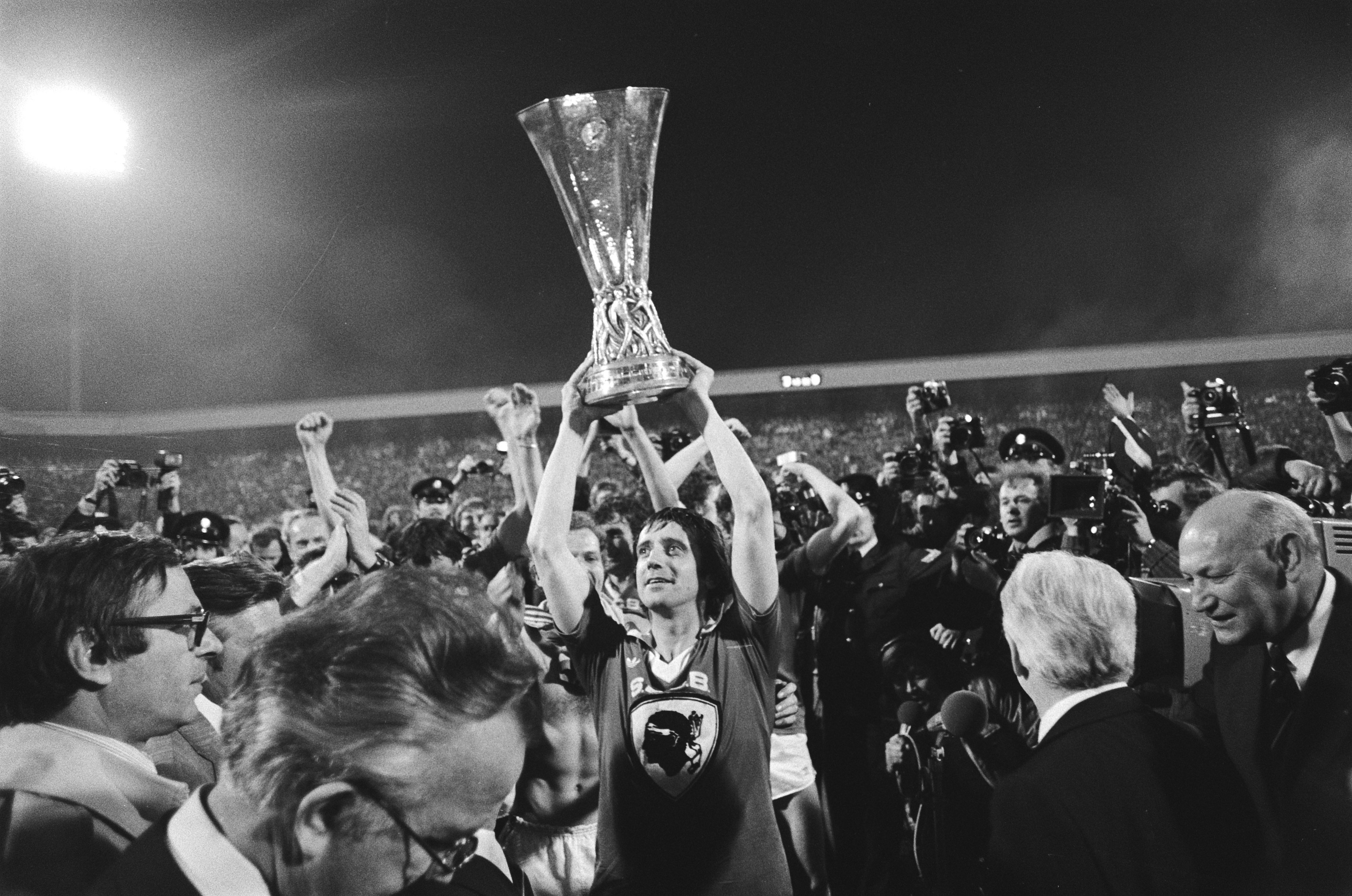

Tournament details
- Dates: 13 September 1977 – 9 May 1978
- Teams: 64

Final positions
- Champions: (Netherlands) PSV (1st title)
- Runners-up: (France) Bastia

Tournament statistics
- Matches played: 126
- Goals scored: 420 (3.33 per match)
- Attendance: 2,896,229 (22,986 per match)
- Top scorer(s): Gerrie Deijkers (PSV Eindhoven); Raimondo Ponte (Grasshoppers); 8 goals each

The 1977–78 UEFA Cup was the seventh season of the UEFA Cup, the third-tier club football competition organised by UEFA. The final was played over two legs at the Stade Armand-Cesari, Furiani, France, and at the Philips Stadion, Eindhoven, the Netherlands. It was won by PSV Eindhoven of the Netherlands, who defeated Bastia of France by an aggregate result of 3–0 to claim their first European title.

Playing in their first European final, PSV became the last of the Dutch Big Three teams to win a European trophy. On the other hand, Bastia was the only French team to reach a UEFA Cup final until 1996 or any European final until 1991.

== Association team allocation ==
A total of 64 teams from 31 UEFA member associations participate in the 1977–78 UEFA Cup. The original allocation scheme was as follows:

- 3 associations have four teams qualify.
- 3 associations have three teams qualify.
- 18 associations have two teams qualify.
- 7 associations have one team qualify.

Poland and Switzerland were the two associations selected to have a third berth for this season, while Hungary and Romania went back to two qualified teams.

Associations in the 1977–78 UEFA Cup

Four teams
West Germany
England
Italy
Three teams
Spain
Poland
Switzerland

Two teams
Netherlands	Soviet Union	East Germany
(Socialist Federal Republic of Yugoslavia) Yugoslavia	Hungary	Portugal
Scotland	Belgium	Czechoslovakia
France	Romania	Bulgaria
Sweden	Greece	Austria
Turkey	Denmark	Norway

One team
(Republic of Ireland) Republic of Ireland
(Northern Ireland) Northern Ireland
Malta
Finland
Iceland
Cyprus
Luxembourg

Did not compete
Wales
Albania

Wales: There was no national league in Wales before 1992 and the only competition organised by the Football Association of Wales was the Welsh Cup so Wales had just a single participant in European competitions, the winner (or best placed Welsh team as several English teams also competed) of the Welsh Cup which competed in the UEFA Cup Winners' Cup.
Albania: Albanian teams were absent from European competition from 1973 to 1978 due to the international isolation of the country during the communist rule of Enver Hoxha. Skënderbeu would have qualified for the UEFA Cup by league position.

=== Teams ===
The labels in the parentheses show how each team qualified for competition:

- TH: Title holders
- CW: Cup winners
- CR: Cup runners-up
- LC: League Cup winners
- 2nd, 3rd, 4th, 5th, 6th, etc.: League position
- P-W: End-of-season European competition play-offs winners

Qualified teams for 1977–78 UEFA Cup
(West Germany) Schalke 04 (2nd)	(West Germany) Eintracht Braunschweig (3rd)	(West Germany) Eintracht Frankfurt (4th)	(West Germany) Bayern Munich (7th)
(England) Manchester City (2nd)	(England) Ipswich Town (3rd)	(England) Aston Villa (4th)	(England) Newcastle United (5th)
(Italy) Torino (2nd)	(Italy) Fiorentina (3rd)	(Italy) Inter Milan (4th)	(Italy) Lazio (5th)
(Spain) Barcelona (2nd)	(Spain) Athletic Bilbao (3rd)	(Spain) Las Palmas (4th)	(Poland) Widzew Łódź (2nd)
(Poland) Górnik Zabrze (3rd)	(Poland) Odra Opole (LC)	(Switzerland) Servette (2nd)	(Switzerland) Zürich (3rd)
(Switzerland) Grasshoppers (4th)	(Netherlands) PSV Eindhoven (2nd)	(Netherlands) AZ Alkmaar (3rd)	(Soviet Union) Dynamo Kyiv (2nd)
(Soviet Union) Dinamo Tbilisi (3rd)	(East Germany) Magdeburg (2nd)	(East Germany) Carl Zeiss Jena (3rd)	(Socialist Federal Republic of Yugoslavia) Dinamo Zagreb (2nd)
(Socialist Federal Republic of Yugoslavia) Sloboda Tuzla (3rd)	(Hungary) Újpest Dosza (2nd)	(Hungary) Ferencváros (3rd)	(Portugal) Sporting CP (2nd)
(Portugal) Boavista (4th)	(Scotland) Aberdeen (3rd)	(Scotland) Dundee United (4th)	(Belgium) Standard Liège (3rd)
(Belgium) Molenbeek (4th)	(Czechoslovakia) Inter Bratislava (2nd)	(Czechoslovakia) Slavia Prague (3rd)	(France) Lens (2nd)
(France) Bastia (3rd)	(Romania) Steaua București (2nd)	(Romania) ASA Târgu Mureș (4th)	(Bulgaria) CSKA Sofia (2nd)
(Bulgaria) Marek Dupnitsa (3rd)	(Sweden) Malmö (2nd)	(Sweden) Landskrona (4th)	(Greece) Olympiacos (2nd)
(Greece) AEK Athens (4th)	(Austria) Rapid Wien (2nd)	(Austria) LASK (4th)	(Turkey) Fenerbahçe (2nd)
(Turkey) Altay (3rd)	(Denmark) Frem (2nd)	(Denmark) KB (3rd)	(Norway) Mjøndalen IF (2nd)
(Norway) IK Start (4th)	(Republic of Ireland) Bohemian (2nd)	(Northern Ireland) Glenavon (2nd)	(Malta) Sliema Wanderers (2nd)
(Finland) FC Haka (2nd)	(Iceland) Fram (2nd)	(Cyprus) APOEL (2nd)	(Luxembourg) Red Boys Differdange (3rd)

== Schedule ==
The schedule of the competition was as follows. Matches were scheduled for Wednesdays, except for five matches that were held on a Tuesday; one of them was the second leg of the final.

Schedule for 1977–78 UEFA Cup
Round	First leg	Second leg
First round	13–14 September 1977	27–28 September 1977
Second round	19 October 1977	2 November 1977
Third round	23 November 1977	7 December 1977
Quarter-finals	1 March 1978	14–15 March 1978
Semi-finals	29 March 1978	12 April 1978
Final	26 April 1978	9 May 1978

== First round ==
Team 1	Agg.	Team 2	1st leg	2nd leg
Eintracht Frankfurt (West Germany)	5–0	(Malta) Sliema Wanderers	5–0	0–0
AZ Alkmaar (Netherlands)	16–1	(Luxembourg) Red Boys Differdange	11–1	5–0
Aston Villa (England)	6–0	(Turkey) Fenerbahçe	4–0	2–0
Barcelona (Spain)	8–2	(Romania) Steaua București	5–1	3–1
Bastia (France)	5–3	(Portugal) Sporting CP	3–2	2–1
Bayern Munich (West Germany)	12–0	(Norway) Mjøndalen	8–0	4–0
Boavista (Portugal)	1–5	(Italy) Lazio	1–0	0–5
Bohemians (Republic of Ireland)	0–4	(England) Newcastle United	0–0	0–4
Carl Zeiss Jena (East Germany)	6–5	(Turkey) Altay	5–1	1–4
Dundee United (Scotland)	1–3	(Denmark) KB	1–0	0–3
Fiorentina (Italy)	1–5	(West Germany) Schalke 04	0–3	1–2
BK Frem (Denmark)	1–8	(Switzerland) Grasshoppers	0–2	1–6
Glenavon (Northern Ireland)	2–11	(Netherlands) PSV Eindhoven	2–6	0–5
Górnik Zabrze (Poland)	5–3	(Finland) FC Haka	5–3	0–0
Inter Milan (Italy)	0–1	(Soviet Union) Dinamo Tbilisi	0–1	0–0
Dynamo Kyiv (Soviet Union)	1–1 (a)	(West Germany) Eintracht Braunschweig	1–1	0–0
Landskrona BoIS (Sweden)	0–6	(England) Ipswich Town	0–1	0–5
Las Palmas (Spain)	8–4	(Socialist Federal Republic of Yugoslavia) Sloboda Tuzla	5–0	3–4
Lens (France)	4–3	(Sweden) Malmö FF	4–1	0–2
LASK (Austria)	3–9	(Hungary) Újpest	3–2	0–7
Odra Opole (Poland)	2–3	(East Germany) Magdeburg	1–2	1–1
Olympiacos (Greece)	4–6	(Socialist Federal Republic of Yugoslavia) Dinamo Zagreb	3–1	1–5
Manchester City (England)	2–2 (a)	(Poland) Widzew Łódź	2–2	0–0
Marek Dupnitsa (Bulgaria)	3–2	(Hungary) Ferencváros	3–0	0–2
Rapid Wien (Austria)	1–3	(Czechoslovakia) Inter Bratislava	1–0	0–3
R.W.D. Molenbeek (Belgium)	2–1	(Scotland) Aberdeen	0–0	2–1
Servette (Switzerland)	1–2	(Spain) Athletic Bilbao	1–0	0–2
Standard Liège (Belgium)	3–3 (a)	(Czechoslovakia) Slavia Prague	1–0	2–3
Start (Norway)	8–0	(Iceland) Fram	6–0	2–0
ASA Târgu Mureş (Romania)	1–3	(Greece) AEK Athens	1–0	0–3
Torino (Italy)	4–1	(Cyprus) APOEL	3–0	1–1
Zürich (Switzerland)	2–1	(Bulgaria) CSKA Sofia	1–0	1–1 (a.e.t.)

=== First leg ===
13 September 1977

Eintracht Frankfurt (West Germany)	5–0	(Malta) Sliema Wanderers
Nickel 19', 25'; Wenzel 21'; Kraus 58'; Grabowski 78'	Report

Waldstadion, Frankfurt
Attendance: 6,000
Referee: Marian Środecki (Poland)

14 September 1977

AZ Alkmaar (Netherlands)	11–1	(Luxembourg) Red Boys Differdange
van Hanegem 5'; Arntz 12'; Nygaard 25', 51', 88'; Peters 39', 50', 60', 80'; Kist 58', 61'	Report	Christophe 54' (pen.)

Alkmaarderhout, Alkmaar
Attendance: 13,800
Referee: Heinz Einbeck (East Germany)

14 September 1977

Aston Villa (England)	4–0	(Turkey) Fenerbahçe
Gray 12'; Deehan 34', 66'; Little 80'	Report

Villa Park, Birmingham
Attendance: 30,351
Referee: Charles Corver (Netherlands)

14 September 1977

Barcelona (Spain)	5–1	(Romania) Steaua București
Heredia 4', 30'; Cruyff 5' (pen.); Clares 63'; Zuviría 82'	Report	Năstase 72'

Camp Nou, Barcelona
Attendance: 68,000
Referee: Ernst Dörflinger (Switzerland)

14 September 1977

Bastia (France)	3–2	(Portugal) Sporting CP
Félix 50', 75', 82'	Report	Jordão 42' (pen.); Fraguito 57'

Stade Armand-Cesari, Furiani
Attendance: 3,954
Referee: Emilio Guruceta Muro (Spain)

14 September 1977

Bayern Munich (West Germany)	8–0	(Norway) Mjøndalen
Oblak 16'; Rummenigge 36', 40', 46'; Hoeneß 53'; Müller 57', 73', 81'	Report

Olympiastadion, Munich
Attendance: 6,500
Referee: Josef Pouček (Czechoslovakia)

14 September 1977

Boavista (Portugal)	1–0	(Italy) Lazio
Gomes 35'	Report

Estádio das Antas, Porto
Attendance: 10,500
Referee: Jean-Claude Jourquin (Belgium)

14 September 1977

Bohemians (Republic of Ireland)	0–0	(England) Newcastle United
	Report

Dalymount Park, Dublin
Attendance: 20,000
Referee: Gwyn Owen (Wales)

14 September 1977

Carl Zeiss Jena (East Germany)	5–1	(Turkey) Altay
Trocha 39'; Vogel 54' (pen.), 79'; Töpfer 75', 88'	Report	Denizli 24' (pen.)

Ernst-Abbe-Sportfeld, Jena
Attendance: 8,000
Referee: Martti Hirviniemi (Finland)

14 September 1977

Dundee United (Scotland)	1–0	(Denmark) KB
Sturrock 66'	Report

Tannadice Park, Dundee
Attendance: 8,406
Referee: Henry Øberg (Norway)

14 September 1977

Fiorentina (Italy)	0–0	(West Germany) Schalke 04
	Report

Stadio Comunale, Florence
Attendance: 38,659
Referee: Michel Vautrot (France)

UEFA invalidated this game and awarded a 3–0 victory to Schalke 04 as Fiorentina fielded an ineligible player, Gianfranco Casarsa.

14 September 1977

BK Frem (Denmark)	0–2	(Switzerland) Grasshoppers
	Report	Elsener 34'; Becker 39'

Valby Idrætspark, Copenhagen
Attendance: 1,956
Referee: Jan Redelfs (West Germany)

14 September 1977

Glenavon (Northern Ireland)	2–6	(Netherlands) PSV Eindhoven
Malone 9' (pen.); McDonald 31'	Report	van der Kuijlen 12', 83'; Krijgh 26'; Deijkers 49'; Deacy 55'; Lubse 82'

Mourneview Park, Lurgan
Attendance: 3,000
Referee: Svein-Inge Thime (Norway)

14 September 1977

Górnik Zabrze (Poland)	5–3	(Finland) FC Haka
Radecki 15'; Gzil 18', 25', 47'; Wasilewski 46'	Report	Jarzina 35' (o.g.); Uimonen 60'; Pirinen 62'

Stadion Górnika, Zabrze
Attendance: 15,000
Referee: Eduard Shklovski (Soviet Union)

14 September 1977

Inter Milan (Italy)	0–1	(Soviet Union) Dinamo Tbilisi
	Report	Kipiani 77'

San Siro, Milan
Attendance: 29,000
Referee: Franz Wöhrer (Austria)

14 September 1977
19:00

Dynamo Kyiv (Soviet Union)	1–1	(West Germany) Eintracht Braunschweig
Veremeyev 36'	Report	Frank 30'

Central Stadium, Kyiv
Attendance: 92,000
Referee: Gianfranco Menegali (Italy)

14 September 1977

Landskrona BoIS (Sweden)	0–1	(England) Ipswich Town
	Report	Whymark 33'

Landskrona IP, Landskrona
Attendance: 7,156
Referee: Norbert Rolles (Luxembourg)

14 September 1977

Las Palmas (Spain)	5–0	(Socialist Federal Republic of Yugoslavia) Sloboda Tuzla
Maciel 10', 80' (pen.); Juani 22'; Morete 66', 78'	Report

Estadio Insular, Las Palmas
Attendance: 18,000
Referee: António Porém Luís (Portugal)

14 September 1977

Lens (France)	4–1	(Sweden) Malmö FF
Bousdira 5'; Françoise 20'; Djebali 53'; Elie 72'	Report	Sjöberg 34'

Stade Bollaert-Delelis, Lens
Attendance: 23,657
Referee: Tomeo Palanques (Spain)

14 September 1977

LASK (Austria)	3–2	(Hungary) Újpest
Köglberger 18', 48'; Vučković 62'	Report	Törőcsik 1', 15'

Linzer Stadion, Linz
Attendance: 11,000
Referee: Ian Foote (Scotland)

14 September 1977

Odra Opole (Poland)	1–2	(East Germany) Magdeburg
Decker 39' (o.g.)	Report	Sparwasser 59', 65'

Odra Stadium, Opole
Attendance: 17,700
Referee: Atanas Mateev (Bulgaria)

14 September 1977

Olympiacos (Greece)	3–1	(Socialist Federal Republic of Yugoslavia) Dinamo Zagreb
Karavitis 34'; Losada 60'; Galakos 62'	Report	Zajec 30'

Karaiskakis Stadium, Piraeus
Attendance: 31,758
Referee: Anatoli Ivanov (Soviet Union)

14 September 1977

Manchester City (England)	2–2	(Poland) Widzew Łódź
Barnes 10'; Channon 50'	Report	Boniek 70', 76' (pen.)

Maine Road, Manchester
Attendance: 33,695
Referee: Dominic Byrne (Republic of Ireland)

14 September 1977

Marek Dupnitsa (Bulgaria)	3–0	(Hungary) Ferencváros
Pargov 18'; V. Petrov 33'; I. Petrov 73'	Report

Stadion Bonchuk, Dupnitsa
Attendance: 18,000
Referee: Nicolae Rainea (Romania)

14 September 1977

Rapid Wien (Austria)	1–0	(Czechoslovakia) Inter Bratislava
Walzer 63'	Report

Weststadion, Vienna
Attendance: 9,750
Referee: Marcel Van Langenhove (Belgium)

14 September 1977

R.W.D. Molenbeek (Belgium)	0–0	(Scotland) Aberdeen
	Report

Oscar Bossaert Stadium, Brussels
Attendance: 12,000
Referee: Lars Åke Björck (Sweden)

14 September 1977

Servette (Switzerland)	1–0	(Spain) Athletic Bilbao
Barberis 26'	Report

Charmilles Stadium, Geneva
Attendance: 18,500
Referee: Heinz Aldinger (West Germany)

14 September 1977

Standard Liège (Belgium)	1–0	(Czechoslovakia) Slavia Prague
Nickel 80'	Report

Stade Maurice Dufrasne, Liège
Attendance: 24,000
Referee: Thomas Reynolds (Wales)

14 September 1977

Start (Norway)	6–0	(Iceland) Fram
Myhre 5'; Skuseth 9'; Haugen 25', 27'; Mathisen 50' (pen.), 55'	Report

Kristiansand Stadion, Kristiansand
Attendance: 1,345
Referee: Sven Jonsson (Sweden)

14 September 1977
16:00

ASA Târgu Mureș (Romania)	1–0	(Greece) AEK Athens
Fănici 81'	Report

Stadionul 23 August, Târgu Mureș
Attendance: 14,000
Referee: Mitko Chukov (Bulgaria)

14 September 1977

Torino (Italy)	3–0	(Cyprus) APOEL
Pulici 14', 40'; C. Sala 54'	Report

Stadio Comunale, Turin
Attendance: 29,438
Referee: Richard Stagno-Navarra (Malta)

14 September 1977

Zürich (Switzerland)	1–0	(Bulgaria) CSKA Sofia
Risi 4'	Report

Letzigrund, Zürich
Attendance: 8,500
Referee: László Pádár (Hungary)

=== Second leg ===
28 September 1977

Sliema Wanderers (Malta)	0–0	(West Germany) Eintracht Frankfurt
	Report

Empire Stadium, Gżira
Attendance: 2,066
Referee: Giulio Ciacci (Italy)

Eintracht Frankfurt won 5–0 on aggregate.

27 September 1977

Red Boys Differdange (Luxembourg)	0–5	(Netherlands) AZ Alkmaar
	Report	Kist 12', 21', 79'; van Hanegem 33'; van Rijnsoever 54'

Stade du Thillenberg, Differdange
Attendance: 2,300
Referee: Roland Racine (Switzerland)

AZ Alkmaar won 16–1 on aggregate.

28 September 1977

Fenerbahçe (Turkey)	0–2	(England) Aston Villa
	Report	Deehan 7'; Little 51'

İnönü Stadium, Istanbul
Attendance: 9,637
Referee: Anatoli Ivanov (Soviet Union)

Aston Villa won 6–0 on aggregate.

28 September 1977

Steaua București (Romania)	1–3	(Spain) Barcelona
Dumitru 36' (pen.)	Report	Cruyff 23'; Asensi 76'; Sánchez 90'

Stadionul Steaua, Bucharest
Attendance: 18,500
Referee: Domenico Serafino (Italy)

Barcelona won 8–2 on aggregate.

28 September 1977

Sporting CP (Portugal)	1–2	(France) Bastia
Fernandes 73'	Report	Rep 87'; Félix 89'

Estádio José Alvalade, Lisbon
Attendance: 55,000
Referee: Jean Dubach (Switzerland)

Bastia won 5–3 on aggregate.

28 September 1977

Mjøndalen (Norway)	0–4	(West Germany) Bayern Munich
	Report	Rausch 17'; Gruber 52'; Künkel 62'; Niedermayer 64'

Ullevaal Stadion, Oslo
Attendance: 7,000
Referee: John Hunting (England)

Bayern Munich won 12–0 on aggregate.

28 September 1977

Lazio (Italy)	5–0	(Portugal) Boavista
Garlaschelli 7', 20'; Giordano 13', 53', 87'	Report

Stadio Olimpico, Rome
Attendance: 37,955
Referee: John Gordon (Scotland)

Lazio won 5–1 on aggregate.

28 September 1977

Newcastle United (England)	4–0	(Republic of Ireland) Bohemians
Gowling 28', 68'; Craig 65', 69'	Report

St James' Park, Newcastle upon Tyne
Attendance: 19,046
Referee: Guðmundur Haraldsson (Iceland)

Newcastle United won 4–0 on aggregate.

28 September 1977

Altay (Turkey)	4–1	(East Germany) Carl Zeiss Jena
Denizli 4', 45'; Akif 37'; Erbaşlar 68'	Report	Lindemann 52'

İzmir Alsancak Stadium, İzmir
Attendance: 5,479
Referee: Francisc Coloşi (Romania)

Carl Zeiss Jena won 6–5 on aggregate.

27 September 1977

KB (Denmark)	3–0	(Scotland) Dundee United
Andersen 49', 84', 89'	Report

Frederiksberg Idrætspark, Frederiksberg
Attendance: 9,000
Referee: Frans Derks (Netherlands)

KB won 3–1 on aggregate.

28 September 1977

Schalke 04 (West Germany)	2–1	(Italy) Fiorentina
Abramczik 17'; H. Kremers 77'	Report	Desolati 82'

Parkstadion, Gelsenkirchen
Attendance: 37,000
Referee: Leonardo Soto Montesinos (Spain)

Schalke 04 won 5–1 on aggregate.

28 September 1977

Grasshoppers (Switzerland)	6–1	(Denmark) BK Frem
Meyer 7', 70'; Becker 40'; Elsener 57'; Ponte 82', 83'	Report	Mikkelsen 45'

Hardturm, Zürich
Attendance: 3,400
Referee: Horst Brummeier (Austria)

Grasshoppers won 8–1 on aggregate.

28 September 1977

PSV Eindhoven (Netherlands)	5–0	(Northern Ireland) Glenavon
Deijkers 28', 53'; Lubse 37', 42'; François 39'	Report

Philips Stadion, Eindhoven
Attendance: 10,500
Referee: Henning Lund-Sørensen (Denmark)

PSV Eindhoven won 11–2 on aggregate.

28 September 1977

FC Haka (Finland)	0–0	(Poland) Górnik Zabrze
	Report

Tehtaan kenttä, Valkeakoski
Attendance: 4,000
Referee: Torben Månsson (Denmark)

Górnik Zabrze won 5–3 on aggregate.

28 September 1977

Dinamo Tbilisi (Soviet Union)	0–0	(Italy) Inter Milan
	Report

Dinamo Stadium, Tbilisi
Attendance: 80,000
Referee: Walter Eschweiler (West Germany)

Dinamo Tbilisi won 1–0 on aggregate.

28 September 1977
19:30

Eintracht Braunschweig (West Germany)	0–0	(Soviet Union) Dynamo Kyiv
	Report

Eintracht-Stadion, Braunschweig
Attendance: 35,000
Referee: Georges Konrath (France)

1–1 on aggregate, Eintracht Braunschweig won on away goals.

28 September 1977

Ipswich Town (England)	5–0	(Sweden) Landskrona BoIS
Whymark 14', 33', 39', 52' (pen.); Mariner 38'	Report

Portman Road, Ipswich
Attendance: 18,741
Referee: Ib Nielsen (Denmark)

Ipswich Town won 6–0 on aggregate.

28 September 1977

Sloboda Tuzla (Socialist Federal Republic of Yugoslavia)	4–3	(Spain) Las Palmas
Geca 37'; Kovačević 50', 51'; Mulahasanović 66'	Report	Morete 15', 85'; Maciel 44'

Tušanj City Stadium, Tuzla
Attendance: 4,000
Referee: Michal Jursa (Czechoslovakia)

Las Palmas won 8–4 on aggregate.

28 September 1977

Malmö FF (Sweden)	2–0	(France) Lens
Cervin 60'; Ljungberg 78'	Report

Malmö IP, Malmö
Attendance: 6,534
Referee: Günter Männig (East Germany)

Lens won 4–3 on aggregate.

28 September 1977

Újpest (Hungary)	7–0	(Austria) LASK
Fazekas 29', 83', 88'; Tóth 52', 70'; Törőcsik 62'; Sarlós 72'	Report

Szusza Ferenc Stadion, Budapest
Attendance: 7,000
Referee: Ertuğrul Dilek (Turkey)

Újpest won 9–3 on aggregate.

28 September 1977

Magdeburg (East Germany)	1–1	(Poland) Odra Opole
Streich 11'	Report	Klose 38'

Ernst Grube Stadium, Magdeburg
Attendance: 18,000
Referee: Constantin Bărbulescu (Romania)

Magdeburg won 3–2 on aggregate.

28 September 1977

Dinamo Zagreb (Socialist Federal Republic of Yugoslavia)	5–1	(Greece) Olympiacos
Cerin 4', 65'; Senzen 16'; Zajec 63' (pen.); Bonić 81'	Report	Karavitis 37' (pen.)

Stadion Maksimir, Zagreb
Attendance: 24,000
Referee: Béla Nagy (Hungary)

Dinamo Zagreb won 6–4 on aggregate.

28 September 1977

Widzew Łódź (Poland)	0–0	(England) Manchester City
	Report

Stadion Miejski Widzewa, Łódź
Attendance: 20,000
Referee: Walter Hungerbühler (Switzerland)

2–2 on aggregate, Widzew Łódź won on away goals rule.

28 September 1977

Ferencváros (Hungary)	2–0	(Bulgaria) Marek Dupnitsa
Pusztai 12'; Ebedli 33' (pen.)	Report

Stadion Albert Flórián, Budapest
Attendance: 18,700
Referee: Heinz Einbeck (East Germany)

Marek Dupnitsa won 3–2 on aggregate.

28 September 1977

Inter Bratislava (Czechoslovakia)	3–0	(Austria) Rapid Wien
Novotný 17'; Levický 59', 74'	Report

Tehelné pole, Bratislava
Attendance: 4,500
Referee: Doğan Babacan (Turkey)

Inter Bratislava won 3–1 on aggregate.

28 September 1977

Aberdeen (Scotland)	1–2	(Belgium) R.W.D. Molenbeek
Jarvie 78'	Report	Gorez 46'; Wellens 85'

Pittodrie Stadium, Aberdeen
Attendance: 26,000
Referee: Alain Delmer (France)

R.W.D. Molenbeek won 2–1 on aggregate.

28 September 1977

Athletic Bilbao (Spain)	2–0	(Switzerland) Servette
Dani 58'; Amorrortu 70'	Report

San Mamés Stadium, Bilbao
Attendance: 20,000
Referee: Hugh Alexander (Scotland)

Athletic Bilbao won 2–1 on aggregate.

28 September 1977

Slavia Prague (Czechoslovakia)	3–2	(Belgium) Standard Liège
Veselý 26'; Hotový 53'; Nachtman 78'	Report	Nickel 14'; Sigurvinsson 46'

Stadion Eden, Prague
Attendance: 15,000
Referee: Rudolf Frickel (West Germany)

3–3 on aggregate, Standard Liège won on away goals rule.

27 September 1977

Fram (Iceland)	0–2	(Norway) Start
	Report	Skuseth 27'; Olsen 65'

Laugardalsvöllur, Reykjavík
Attendance: 800
Referee: Malcolm Moffatt (Northern Ireland)

Start won 8–0 on aggregate.

28 September 1977
21:00

AEK Athens (Greece)	3–0	(Romania) ASA Târgu Mureș
Papaioannou 24'; Viera 35'; Mousouris 44'	Report

AEK Stadium, Nea Filadelfeia
Attendance: 14,730
Referee: Tome Manojlovski (Yugoslavia)

AEK Athens won 3–1 on aggregate.

28 September 1977

APOEL (Cyprus)	1–1	(Italy) Torino
Markou 20'	Report	Garritano 76'

GSP Stadium (1902), Nicosia
Attendance: 5,107
Referee: Otto Anderco (Romania)

Torino won 4–1 on aggregate.

28 September 1977

CSKA Sofia (Bulgaria)	1–1 (a.e.t.)	(Switzerland) Zürich
Markov 32'	Report	Cucinotta 105'

Stadion Balgarska Armia, Sofia
Attendance: 20,000
Referee: Adolf Mathias (Austria)

Zürich won 2–1 on aggregate.

== Second round ==
Team 1	Agg.	Team 2	1st leg	2nd leg
AEK Athens (Greece)	3–6	(Belgium) Standard Liège	2–2	1–4
AZ Alkmaar (Netherlands)	2–2 (4–5 p)	(Spain) Barcelona	1–1	1–1 (a.e.t.)
Aston Villa (England)	3–1	(Poland) Górnik Zabrze	2–0	1–1
Bastia (France)	5–2	(England) Newcastle United	2–1	3–1
Bayern Munich (West Germany)	3–2	(Bulgaria) Marek Dupnitsa	3–0	0–2
Inter Bratislava (Czechoslovakia)	2–5	(Switzerland) Grasshoppers	1–0	1–5
Ipswich Town (England)	4–3	(Spain) Las Palmas	1–0	3–3
KB (Denmark)	2–6	(Soviet Union) Dinamo Tbilisi	1–4	1–2
Lazio (Italy)	2–6	(France) Lens	2–0	0–6 (a.e.t.)
Magdeburg (East Germany)	7–3	(West Germany) Schalke 04	4–2	3–1
R.W.D. Molenbeek (Belgium)	2–2 (5–6 p)	(East Germany) Carl Zeiss Jena	1–1	1–1 (a.e.t.)
Start (Norway)	1–4	(West Germany) Eintracht Braunschweig	1–0	0–4
Torino (Italy)	3–2	(Socialist Federal Republic of Yugoslavia) Dinamo Zagreb	3–1	0–1
Újpest (Hungary)	2–3	(Spain) Athletic Bilbao	2–0	0–3 (a.e.t.)
Widzew Łódź (Poland)	3–6	(Netherlands) PSV Eindhoven	3–5	0–1
Zürich (Switzerland)	3–7	(West Germany) Eintracht Frankfurt	0–3	3–4

=== First leg ===
19 October 1977
18:30

AEK Athens (Greece)	2–2	(Belgium) Standard Liège
Mavros 57'; Nikoloudis 83'	Report	Sigurvinsson 14'; Poel 42'

AEK Stadium, Nea Filadelfeia
Attendance: 20,458
Referee: Ken Burns (England)

19 October 1977

AZ Alkmaar (Netherlands)	1–1	(Spain) Barcelona
Nygaard 41'	Report	Neeskens 46'

Alkmaarderhout, Alkmaar
Attendance: 20,019
Referee: Walter Eschweiler (West Germany)

19 October 1977

Aston Villa (England)	2–0	(Poland) Górnik Zabrze
McNaught 11', 54'	Report

Villa Park, Birmingham
Attendance: 34,138
Referee: Ángel Franco Martínez (Spain)

19 October 1977

Bastia (France)	2–1	(England) Newcastle United
Papi 50', 89'	Report	Cannell 7'

Stade Armand-Cesari, Furiani
Attendance: 8,403
Referee: Erich Linemayr (Austria)

19 October 1977

Bayern Munich (West Germany)	3–0	(Bulgaria) Marek Dupnitsa
Müller 44'; Rummenigge 50', 64'	Report

Olympiastadion, Munich
Attendance: 14,000
Referee: Paul Bonett (Malta)

19 October 1977

Inter Bratislava (Czechoslovakia)	1–0	(Switzerland) Grasshoppers
Bauer 83' (o.g.)	Report

Tehelné pole, Bratislava
Attendance: 4,600
Referee: William Gow (Wales)

19 October 1977

Ipswich Town (England)	1–0	(Spain) Las Palmas
Gates 23'	Report

Portman Road, Ipswich
Attendance: 22,195
Referee: Jean Dubach (Switzerland)

19 October 1977

KB (Denmark)	1–4	(Soviet Union) Dinamo Tbilisi
Laudrup 80'	Report	Chivadze 10'; Kipiani 25'; Chelebadze 75'; Shengelia 84'

Frederiksberg Idrætspark, Frederiksberg
Attendance: 6,400
Referee: Thomas Perry (Northern Ireland)

19 October 1977

Lazio (Italy)	2–0	(France) Lens
Wilson 30'; Giordano 31'	Report

Stadio Olimpico, Rome
Attendance: 50,739
Referee: Josef Bucek (Austria)

19 October 1977

Magdeburg (East Germany)	4–2	(West Germany) Schalke 04
Sparwasser 18', 45', 64'; Steinbach 76'	Report	Demange 51'; Abramczik 55'

Ernst Grube Stadium, Magdeburg
Attendance: 36,000
Referee: Erik Fredriksson (Sweden)

19 October 1977

R.W.D. Molenbeek (Belgium)	1–1	(East Germany) Carl Zeiss Jena
Wellens 37'	Report	Lindemann 41'

Oscar Bossaert Stadium, Brussels
Attendance: 10,000
Referee: Emilio Guruceta Muro (Spain)

19 October 1977

Start (Norway)	1–0	(West Germany) Eintracht Braunschweig
Haugen 78'	Report

Kristiansand Stadion, Kristiansand
Attendance: 7,917
Referee: Henning Lund-Sørensen (Denmark)

19 October 1977

Torino (Italy)	3–1	(Socialist Federal Republic of Yugoslavia) Dinamo Zagreb
Pulici 8'; P. Sala 26'; Pecci 49'	Report	Bonić 58'

Stadio Comunale, Turin
Attendance: 41,214
Referee: Lajos Somlai (Hungary)

19 October 1977

Újpest (Hungary)	2–0	(Spain) Athletic Bilbao
Törőcsik 7'; Viczkó 85'	Report

Szusza Ferenc Stadion, Budapest
Attendance: 9,700
Referee: Sergio Gonella (Italy)

19 October 1977

Widzew Łódź (Poland)	3–5	(Netherlands) PSV Eindhoven
Rozborski 16'; Kowenicki 65'; Boniek 79'	Report	Deacy 25'; Deijkers 37', 55'; van der Kuijlen 72'; François 74'

Stadion Miejski Widzewa, Łódź
Attendance: 35,000
Referee: Alfred Delcourt (Belgium)

19 October 1977

Zürich (Switzerland)	0–3	(West Germany) Eintracht Frankfurt
	Report	Hölzenbein 28'; Wenzel 77'; Grabowski 90'

Letzigrund, Zürich
Attendance: 17,000
Referee: Vojtech Christov (Czechoslovakia)

=== Second leg ===
2 November 1977
20:00

Standard Liège (Belgium)	4–1	(Greece) AEK Athens
Labarbe 41'; Riedl 64'; Nickel 69'; Gorez 85'	Report	Ardizoglou 63'

Stade Maurice Dufrasne, Liège
Attendance: 30,000
Referee: Walter Hungerbühler (Switzerland)

Standard Liège won 6–3 on aggregate.

2 November 1977

Barcelona (Spain)	1–1 (a.e.t.)	(Netherlands) AZ Alkmaar
Rexach 32' (pen.)	Report	Kist 69'
Penalties
Rexach (penalty scored); Asensi (penalty scored); Olmo (penalty scored); Amarillo (penalty scored); Cruyff (penalty scored)	5–4	(penalty scored) Metgod; (penalty scored) Kist; (penalty missed) Nygaard; (penalty scored) Arntz; (penalty scored) Spelbos

Camp Nou, Barcelona
Attendance: 53,000
Referee: John Wright Paterson (Scotland)

2–2 on aggregate, Barcelona won in a penalty shoot-out.

2 November 1977

Górnik Zabrze (Poland)	1–1	(England) Aston Villa
Marcinkowski 40'	Report	Gray 52'

Stadion Górnika, Zabrze
Attendance: 15,000
Referee: Alberto Michelotti (Italy)

Aston Villa won 3–1 on aggregate.

2 November 1977

Newcastle United (England)	1–3	(France) Bastia
Gowling 36'	Report	de Zerbi 3'; Rep 9', 67'

St James' Park, Newcastle upon Tyne
Attendance: 34,560
Referee: Svein-Inge Thime (Norway)

Bastia won 5–2 on aggregate.

2 November 1977

Marek Dupnitsa (Bulgaria)	2–0	(West Germany) Bayern Munich
I. Petrov 32'; Pargov 37'	Report

Stadion Bonchuk, Dupnitsa
Attendance: 27,000
Referee: Paul Bonett (Malta)

Bayern Munich won 3–2 on aggregate.

2 November 1977

Grasshoppers (Switzerland)	5–1	(Czechoslovakia) Inter Bratislava
Elsener 3', 35'; Ponte 40'; Sulser 60'; Hey 80'	Report	Jurkemik 75'

Hardturm, Zürich
Attendance: 5,500
Referee: Jan Beck (Netherlands)

Grasshoppers won 5–2 on aggregate.

2 November 1977

Las Palmas (Spain)	3–3	(England) Ipswich Town
Morete 24', 55'; Fernández 78'	Report	Mariner 11', 70'; Tibbott 28'

Estadio Gran Canaria, Las Palmas
Attendance: 22,000
Referee: Achille Verbecke (France)

Ipswich Town won 4–3 on aggregate.

2 November 1977

Dinamo Tbilisi (Soviet Union)	2–1	(Denmark) KB
Chelebadze 53', 58'	Report	Andersen 84'

Dinamo Stadium, Tbilisi
Attendance: 80,000
Referee: Anders Mattsson (Finland)

Dinamo Tbilisi won 6–2 on aggregate.

2 November 1977

Lens (France)	6–0 (a.e.t.)	(Italy) Lazio
Six 45', 57', 115'; Bousdira 109'; Djebali 118', 119'	Report

Stade Bollaert-Delelis, Lens
Attendance: 28,000
Referee: César Correia (Portugal)

Lens won 6–2 on aggregate.

2 November 1977

Schalke 04 (West Germany)	1–3	(East Germany) Magdeburg
Kremers 51'	Report	Pommerenke 15', 49'; Steinbach 20'

Parkstadion, Gelsenkirchen
Attendance: 70,600
Referee: Brian McGinlay (Scotland)

Magdeburg won 7–3 on aggregate.

2 November 1977

Carl Zeiss Jena (East Germany)	1–1 (a.e.t.)	(Belgium) R.W.D. Molenbeek
Lindemann 62' (pen.)	Report	Alhinho 68'
Penalties
Weise (penalty scored); Töpfer (penalty scored); Schnuphase (penalty scored); Oevermann (penalty scored); Lindemann (penalty missed); Sengewald (penalty scored); Brauer (penalty scored)	6–5	(penalty missed) Martens; (penalty scored) Cordiez; (penalty scored) Boskamp; (penalty scored) Wißmann; (penalty scored) Wellens; (penalty scored) Gorez; (penalty missed) Dumon

Ernst-Abbe-Sportfeld, Jena
Attendance: 11,500
Referee: Doğan Babacan (Turkey)

2–2 on aggregate, Carl Zeiss Jena won in a penalty shoot-out.

2 November 1977

Eintracht Braunschweig (West Germany)	4–0	(Norway) Start
Breitner 14'; Handschuh 47'; Hollmann 55', 79'	Report

Eintracht-Stadion, Braunschweig
Attendance: 9,619
Referee: Dobrosław Stec (Poland)

Eintracht Braunschweig won 4–1 on aggregate.

2 November 1977

Dinamo Zagreb (Socialist Federal Republic of Yugoslavia)	1–0	(Italy) Torino
Senzen 24'	Report

Stadion Maksimir, Zagreb
Attendance: 40,000
Referee: Eldar Azimzade (Soviet Union)

Torino won 3–2 on aggregate.

2 November 1977

Athletic Bilbao (Spain)	3–0 (a.e.t.)	(Hungary) Újpest
Dani 69', 81'; Tirapu 107'	Report

San Mamés Stadium, Bilbao
Attendance: 34,000
Referee: Pat Partridge (England)

Athletic Bilbao won 3–2 on aggregate.

2 November 1977

PSV Eindhoven (Netherlands)	1–0	(Poland) Widzew Łódź
Deijkers 70'	Report

Philips Stadion, Eindhoven
Attendance: 10,900
Referee: Dušan Maksimović (Yugoslavia)

PSV Eindhoven won 6–3 on aggregate.

2 November 1977

Eintracht Frankfurt (West Germany)	4–3	(Switzerland) Zürich
Kraus 1'; Grabowski 62'; Stepanović 68'; Krobbach 87'	Report	Risi 45' (pen.), 60'; Torstensson 78'

Waldstadion, Frankfurt
Attendance: 3,600
Referee: Anatoli Ivanov (Soviet Union)

Eintracht Frankfurt won 7–3 on aggregate.

== Third round ==
Team 1	Agg.	Team 2	1st leg	2nd leg
Aston Villa (England)	3–1	(Spain) Athletic Bilbao	2–0	1–1
Bastia (France)	5–3	(Italy) Torino	2–1	3–2
Carl Zeiss Jena (East Germany)	4–1	(Belgium) Standard Liège	2–0	2–1
Eintracht Frankfurt (West Germany)	6–1	(West Germany) Bayern Munich	4–0	2–1
Ipswich Town (England)	3–3 (1–3 p)	(Spain) Barcelona	3–0	0–3 (a.e.t.)
Magdeburg (East Germany)	4–2	(France) Lens	4–0	0–2
PSV Eindhoven (Netherlands)	4–1	(West Germany) Eintracht Braunschweig	2–0	2–1
Dinamo Tbilisi (Soviet Union)	1–4	(Switzerland) Grasshoppers	1–0	0–4

=== First leg ===
23 November 1977

Aston Villa (England)	2–0	(Spain) Athletic Bilbao
Iribar 34' (o.g.); Deehan 78'	Report

Villa Park, Birmingham
Attendance: 32,973
Referee: Jan Beck (Netherlands)

23 November 1977

Bastia (France)	2–1	(Italy) Torino
Papi 37'; Rep 63'	Report	Pulici 24'

Stade Armand-Cesari, Furiani
Attendance: 9,743
Referee: Heinz Aldinger (West Germany)

23 November 1977

Carl Zeiss Jena (East Germany)	2–0	(Belgium) Standard Liège
Schnuphase 11'; Lindemann 75' (pen.)	Report

Ernst-Abbe-Sportfeld, Jena
Attendance: 12,000
Referee: Ángel Franco Martínez (Spain)

23 November 1977

Eintracht Frankfurt (West Germany)	4–0	(West Germany) Bayern Munich
Grabowski 23'; Hölzenbein 37'; Kraus 66'; Skala 67'	Report

Waldstadion, Frankfurt
Attendance: 23,000
Referee: Nicolae Rainea (Romania)

23 November 1977

Ipswich Town (England)	3–0	(Spain) Barcelona
Gates 17'; Whymark 61'; Talbot 77'	Report

Portman Road, Ipswich
Attendance: 33,663
Referee: Adolf Prokop (East Germany)

23 November 1977

Magdeburg (East Germany)	4–0	(France) Lens
Zapf 4'; Pommerenke 35' (pen.); Hoffmann 55'; Steinbach 65'	Report

Ernst Grube Stadium, Magdeburg
Attendance: 25,000
Referee: Francis Rion (Belgium)

23 November 1977

PSV Eindhoven (Netherlands)	2–0	(West Germany) Eintracht Braunschweig
Lubse 65'; van der Kuijlen 72'	Report

Philips Stadion, Eindhoven
Attendance: 23,000
Referee: Brian McGinlay (Scotland)

23 November 1977

Dinamo Tbilisi (Soviet Union)	1–0	(Switzerland) Grasshoppers
Shengelia 20'	Report

Dinamo Stadium, Tbilisi
Attendance: 75,000
Referee: Rolf Nyhus (Norway)

=== Second leg ===
7 December 1977

Athletic Bilbao (Spain)	1–1	(England) Aston Villa
Dani 85'	Report	Mortimer 44'

San Mamés Stadium, Bilbao
Attendance: 39,000
Referee: Jean Dubach (Switzerland)

Aston Villa won 3–1 on aggregate.

7 December 1977

Torino (Italy)	2–3	(France) Bastia
Graziani 22' 47'	Report	Larios 19'; Krimau 50', 65'

Stadio Comunale, Turin
Attendance: 36,949
Referee: Clive Thomas (Wales)

Bastia won 5–3 on aggregate.

7 December 1977

Standard Liège (Belgium)	1–2	(East Germany) Carl Zeiss Jena
Nickel 75'	Report	Sengewald 37'; Weise 81' (pen.)

Stade Maurice Dufrasne, Liège
Attendance: 30,000
Referee: John Carpenter (Republic of Ireland)

Carl Zeiss Jena won 4–1 on aggregate.

7 December 1977

Bayern Munich (West Germany)	1–2	(West Germany) Eintracht Frankfurt
Rummenigge 2'	Report	Wenzel 83'; Hölzenbein 86'

Olympiastadion, Munich
Attendance: 13,000
Referee: Cesare Gussoni (Italy)

Eintracht Frankfurt won 6–1 on aggregate.

7 December 1977

Barcelona (Spain)	3–0 (a.e.t.)	(England) Ipswich Town
Cruyff 20', 47'; Rexach 87' (pen.)	Report
Penalties
Rexach (penalty scored); Asensi (penalty scored); Olmo (penalty missed); Amarillo (penalty scored)	3–1	(penalty missed) Talbot; (penalty missed) Viljoen; (penalty scored) Mills; (penalty missed) Woods

Camp Nou, Barcelona
Attendance: 45,000
Referee: Erich Linemayr (Austria)

3–3 on aggregate, Barcelona won in a penalty shoot-out.

7 December 1977

Lens (France)	2–0	(East Germany) Magdeburg
Bousdira 4', 46'	Report

Stade Bollaert-Delelis, Lens
Attendance: 25,794
Referee: Pat Partridge (England)

Magdeburg won 4–2 on aggregate.

7 December 1977

Eintracht Braunschweig (West Germany)	1–2	(Netherlands) PSV Eindhoven
Grzyb 47'	Report	van Kraay 33'; Deijkers 43'

Eintracht-Stadion, Braunschweig
Attendance: 18,300
Referee: Károly Palotai (Hungary)

PSV Eindhoven won 4–1 on aggregate.

7 December 1977

Grasshoppers (Switzerland)	4–0	(Soviet Union) Dinamo Tbilisi
Sulser 14'; Ponte 46' (pen.), 77'; Elsener 90+1'	Report

Hardturm, Zürich
Attendance: 17,000
Referee: Michel Kitabdjian (France)

Grasshoppers won 4–1 on aggregate.

== Quarter-finals ==
Team 1	Agg.	Team 2	1st leg	2nd leg
Aston Villa (England)	3–4	(Spain) Barcelona	2–2	1–2
Bastia (France)	9–6	(East Germany) Carl Zeiss Jena	7–2	2–4
Magdeburg (East Germany)	3–4	(Netherlands) PSV Eindhoven	1–0	2–4
Eintracht Frankfurt (West Germany)	3–3 (a)	(Switzerland) Grasshoppers	3–2	0–1

=== First leg ===
1 March 1978

Aston Villa (England)	2–2	(Spain) Barcelona
McNaught 87'; Deehan 89'	Report	Cruyff 20'; Zuviría 80'

Villa Park, Birmingham
Attendance: 46,619
Referee: César Correia (Portugal)

1 March 1978

Bastia (France)	7–2	(East Germany) Carl Zeiss Jena
Larios 3'; Papi 41'; Mariot 57'; Félix 69', 77'; Cazes 82'; Franceschetti 86'	Report	Raab 62', 71'

Stade Armand-Cesari, Furiani
Attendance: 9,500
Referee: Alfred Delcourt (Belgium)

1 March 1978

Magdeburg (East Germany)	1–0	(Netherlands) PSV Eindhoven
Streich 75'	Report

Ernst Grube Stadium, Magdeburg
Attendance: 33,000
Referee: Emilio Guruceta Muro (Spain)

1 March 1978

Eintracht Frankfurt (West Germany)	3–2	(Switzerland) Grasshoppers
Kraus 58'; Hölzenbein 68', 90' (pen.)	Report	Bosco 36'; Ponte 52' (pen.)

Waldstadion, Frankfurt
Attendance: 14,000
Referee: Erich Linemayr (Austria)

=== Second leg ===
15 March 1978

Barcelona (Spain)	2–1	(England) Aston Villa
Migueli 67'; Asensi 77'	Report	Little 57'

Camp Nou, Barcelona
Attendance: 90,000
Referee: Doğan Babacan (Turkey)

Barcelona won 4–3 on aggregate.

15 March 1978

Carl Zeiss Jena (East Germany)	4–2	(France) Bastia
Raab 21'; Lindemann 33'; Vogel 53'; Töpfer 69' (pen.)	Report	Papi 26'; Krimau 64'

Ernst-Abbe-Sportfeld, Jena
Attendance: 17,000
Referee: Alberto Michelotti (Italy)

Bastia won 9–6 on aggregate.

15 March 1978

PSV Eindhoven (Netherlands)	4–2	(East Germany) Magdeburg
Brandts 39', 72'; Seguin 45' (o.g.); Lubse 89'	Report	Hoffmann 36'; Pommerenke 71'

Philips Stadion, Eindhoven
Attendance: 27,000
Referee: Franz Wöhrer (Austria)

PSV Eindhoven won 4–3 on aggregate.

14 March 1978

Grasshoppers (Switzerland)	1–0	(West Germany) Eintracht Frankfurt
Ponte 33' (pen.)	Report

Hardturm, Zürich
Attendance: 30,000
Referee: Dušan Maksimović (Yugoslavia)

3–3 on aggregate, Grasshoppers won on away goals rule.

== Semi-finals ==
Team 1	Agg.	Team 2	1st leg	2nd leg
Grasshoppers (Switzerland)	3–3 (a)	(France) Bastia	3–2	0–1
PSV Eindhoven (Netherlands)	4–3	(Spain) Barcelona	3–0	1–3

=== First leg ===
29 March 1978

Grasshoppers (Switzerland)	3–2	(France) Bastia
Hermann 22'; Ponte 31' (pen.); Montandon 54'	Report	Krimau 18'; Papi 37' (pen.)

Hardturm, Zürich
Attendance: 29,000
Referee: John Carpenter (Republic of Ireland)

29 March 1978

PSV Eindhoven (Netherlands)	3–0	(Spain) Barcelona
Olmo 9' (o.g.); Lubse 21'; Postuma 70'	Report

Philips Stadion, Eindhoven
Attendance: 27,000
Referee: Sergio Gonella (Italy)

=== Second leg ===
12 April 1978

Bastia (France)	1–0	(Switzerland) Grasshoppers
Papi 67'	Report

Stade Armand-Cesari, Furiani
Attendance: 11,000
Referee: Pat Partridge (England)

3–3 on aggregate, Bastia won on away goals rule.

12 April 1978

Barcelona (Spain)	3–1	(Netherlands) PSV Eindhoven
Rexach 9' (pen.), 66' (pen.); Fortes 19'	Report	Deacy 47'

Camp Nou, Barcelona
Attendance: 65,000
Referee: Robert Wurtz (France)

PSV won 4–3 on aggregate.

== Final ==
=== First leg ===
26 April 1978

Bastia (France)	0–0	(Netherlands) PSV Eindhoven
	Report

Stade Armand-Cesari, Furiani
Attendance: 8,006
Referee: Dušan Maksimović (Yugoslavia)

=== Second leg ===
9 May 1978

PSV Eindhoven (Netherlands)	3–0	(France) Bastia
W. van de Kerkhof 24'; Deijkers 67' van der Kuijlen 69'	Report

Philips Stadion, Eindhoven
Attendance: 28,000
Referee: Nicolae Rainea (Romania)

PSV Eindhoven won 3–0 on aggregate
