= 1978 Bulgarian Cup final =

- Event: 1977–78 Bulgarian Cup
CSKA Sofia	Marek Dupnitsa
0	1
- Date: 24 May 1978
- Venue: Vasil Levski National Stadium, Sofia
- Referee: Valentin Lipatov (USSR)
- Attendance: 40,000

The 1978 Bulgarian Cup final was the 38th final of the Bulgarian Cup (in this period the tournament was named Cup of the Soviet Army), and was contested between CSKA Sofia and Marek Dupnitsa on 24 May 1978 at Vasil Levski National Stadium in Sofia. Marek won the final 1–0.

== Match ==
=== Details ===
24 May 1978

CSKA Sofia	0−1	Marek Dupnitsa
		Sevdin 30'

Vasil Levski National Stadium, Sofia
Attendance: 40,000
Referee: Valentin Lipatov (USSR)

CSKA	Marek

GK	1	(Bulgaria) Boris Manolkov
DF	2	(Bulgaria) Ivan Zafirov	(substituted off) 46'
DF	3	(Bulgaria) Georgi Dimitrov
DF	4	(Bulgaria) Tsonyo Vasilev
DF	5	(Bulgaria) Bozhil Kolev (c)
MF	6	(Bulgaria) Ivan Metodiev
FW	7	(Bulgaria) Tsvetan Yonchev
MF	8	(Bulgaria) Borislav Sredkov
FW	9	(Bulgaria) Nikola Hristov	(substituted off) 67'
FW	10	(Bulgaria) Georgi Denev
MF	11	(Bulgaria) Dimitar Dimitrov
Substitutes:
DF	--	(Bulgaria) Valeri Peychev	(substituted in) 46'
FW	--	(Bulgaria) Spas Dzhevizov	(substituted in) 67'
Manager:
(Bulgaria) Nikola Kovachev

GK	1	(Bulgaria) Stoyan Stoyanov
DF	2	(Bulgaria) Lyuben Sevdin
DF	3	(Bulgaria) Lyuben Kolev
DF	4	(Bulgaria) Roman Karakolev
DF	5	(Bulgaria) Ivan Palev
MF	6	(Bulgaria) Aleksandar Raynov
FW	7	(Bulgaria) Sasho Pargov (c)	(substituted off) 68'
MF	8	(Bulgaria) Asen Tomov	(substituted off) 80'
FW	9	(Bulgaria) Ivan Petrov
MF	10	(Bulgaria) Ventsislav Petrov
MF	11	(Bulgaria) Dimitar Dimitrov
Substitutes:
DF	--	(Bulgaria) Nikolay Vukov	(substituted in) 68'
MF	--	(Bulgaria) Emil Kyuchukov	(substituted in) 80'
Manager:
(Bulgaria) Yanko Dinkov

== See also ==
- 1977–78 A Group
