= Copa do Craque de Masters squads =

These are the squads for the national teams participated in the Copa do Craque de Masters held in Brazil, in 1990. The tournament was played in a round robin format and the hosts won the trophy.

== Group ==
=== Brazil ===
Head coach: Luciano do Valle

No.	Pos.	Player	Date of birth (age)	Caps	Club
1	GK	Paulo Vítor	7 June 1957 (aged 32)	9	(Brazil) Sport Recife
3	DF	Luís Pereira	21 June 1949 (aged 40)	32	(Brazil) São Caetano
5	MF	Zenon	31 March 1954 (aged 35)	5	(Brazil) Grêmio Maringá
7	MF	Cafuringa	10 November 1948 (aged 41)	-	(Brazil) Retired
8	MF	Zico	3 March 1953 (aged 36)	71	(Brazil) Retired
9	FW	Cláudio Adão	2 July 1955 (aged 34)	-	(Peru) Sport Boys
10	MF	Rivellino	1 January 1946 (aged 44)	92	(Brazil) Retired
11	FW	Edu	6 August 1949 (aged 40)	42	(Brazil) Retired
12	GK	Paulo Sérgio	24 July 1954 (aged 35)	3	(Brazil) Retired
14	MF	Jayme de Almeida	17 May 1953 (aged 36)	1	(Brazil) Retired
15	MF	Mário Sérgio	7 September 1950 (aged 39)	8	(Brazil) Retired
16	DF	Wladimir	29 August 1954 (aged 35)	7	(Brazil) Cruzeiro
17	MF	Batista	8 March 1955 (aged 34)	38	(Brazil) Retired
18	MF	Paulo Isidoro	3 August 1953 (aged 36)	36	(Brazil) Cruzeiro
20	FW	Serginho Chulapa	23 December 1953 (aged 36)	20	(Brazil) Santos
21	FW	Éder	25 May 1957 (aged 32)	52	(Brazil) Clube Atlético Mineiro
13	DF	Nelinho	26 July 1950 (aged 39)	21	(Brazil) Retired
23	DF	Juninho Fonseca	29 August 1958 (aged 31)	4	(Brazil) Nacional Atlético Clube (SP)
2	DF	Rodrigues Neto	6 December 1949 (aged 40)	11	(Brazil) Retired
6	MF	Reinaldo	11 January 1957 (aged 32)	37	(Brazil) Retired
19	MF	Rocha	28 October 1958 (aged 31)	-	(Brazil) Esporte Clube XV de Novembro (Piracicaba)

Players who were called up but did travel to said tournament:*(N°4)DF

- (N°22)GK

=== Netherlands ===
Head coach: Joop Stoffelen
Assistant coach: Willy van de Kerkhof

No.	Pos.	Player	Date of birth (age)	Caps	Club
1	GK	Pim Doesburg	28 October 1943 (aged 46)	8	(Netherlands) Retired
2	MF	John Oude Wesselink	9 October 1950 (aged 39)	4	(Netherlands) Retired
3	DF	Hugo Hovenkamp	8 October 1950 (aged 39)	31	(Netherlands) Retired
4	DF	Wim Rijsbergen	18 January 1952 (aged 37)	28	(Netherlands) Retired
5	MF	René van de Kerkhof	16 September 1951 (aged 38)	47	(Netherlands) Retired
6	MF	Jan Peters	18 August 1954 (aged 35)	31	(Netherlands) Retired
8	MF	Willy van de Kerkhof	16 September 1951 (aged 38)	63	(Netherlands) Retired
9	MF	Johnny Rep	25 November 1951 (aged 38)	42	(Netherlands) Retired
10	MF	Tschen La Ling	6 January 1956 (aged 34)	14	(Netherlands) Retired
11	DF	Peter Boeve	14 March 1957 (aged 32)	16	(Netherlands) Retired
12	MF	Jan van Deinsen	19 June 1953 (aged 36)	1	(Netherlands) Retired
14	DF	Henk Warnas	7 December 1943 (aged 46)	5	(Netherlands) Retired
16	GK	Piet Schrijvers	15 December 1946 (aged 43)	46	(Netherlands) Retired
7	FW	Henk Wery	10 June 1943 (aged 46)	12	(Netherlands) Retired
18	FW	Peter van Velzen	11 January 1958 (aged 31)	-	(Netherlands) SVV

Players who were called up but did travel to said tournament:*(N°13)DF *(N°15)MF *(N°17)FW *(N°18)MF *(N°19)DF *(N°20)MF *(N°21)GK *(N°22)DF *(N°23)FW

=== Poland ===
Head coach: Ryszard Kowenicki

No.	Pos.	Player	Date of birth (age)	Caps	Club
1	GK	Piotr Mowlik	21 April 1951 (aged 38)	21	(Poland) Retired
3	DF	Paweł Janas	4 March 1953 (aged 36)	53	(Poland) Retired
4	DF	Wojciech Rudy	24 October 1952 (aged 37)	40	(Poland) Retired
7	FW	Grzegorz Lato	8 April 1950 (aged 39)	100	(Poland) Polonia Hamilton
8	FW	Kazimierz Kmiecik	19 September 1951 (aged 38)	35	(Poland) Retired
9	MF	Janusz Kupcewicz	9 December 1955 (aged 34)	20	(Poland) Retired
10	MF	Lesław Ćmikiewicz	3 May 1947 (aged 42)	57	(Poland) Retired
11	FW	Zdzisław Puszkarz	18 February 1950 (aged 39)	1	(Poland) Retired
13	DF	Henryk Wawrowski	25 September 1949 (aged 40)	25	(Poland) Retired
14	DF	Jerzy Kraska	24 December 1951 (aged 38)	13	(Poland) Retired
15	FW	Zdzisław Kapka	7 December 1954 (aged 35)	14	(Poland) Retired
16	MF	Leszek Lipka	6 April 1958 (aged 31)	21	(Poland) Retired
14	FW	Włodzimierz Lubański	26 February 1947 (aged 42)	75	(Poland) Retired
12	GK	Jan Tomaszewski	9 January 1948 (aged 42)	63	(Poland) Retired
2	DF	Wojciech Rudy	24 October 1952 (aged 37)	40	(Poland) Retired
5	MF	Robert Gadocha	10 January 1946 (aged 44)	62	(Poland) Retired
19	DF	Karol Kordysz	22 December 1955 (aged 34)	-	(Poland) Retired
21	DF	Antoni Szymanowski	13 January 1951 (aged 38)	82	(Poland) Retired

Players who were called up but did travel to said tournament:(N°6)DF *(N°17)DF *(N°18)FW *(N°20)MF *(N°22)GK *(N°23)DF

=== Italy ===
Head coach:

No.	Pos.	Player	Date of birth (age)	Caps	Club
1	GK	Renato Copparoni	27 October 1952 (aged 37)	-	(Italy) Retired
2	DF	Claudio Gentile	27 September 1953 (aged 36)	71	(Italy) Retired
3	DF	Graziano Bini	7 January 1955 (aged 35)	-	(Italy) Retired
5	DF	Carmine Gentile	5 April 1954 (aged 35)	-	(Italy) Retired
6	DF	Moreno Roggi	24 March 1954 (aged 35)	7	(Italy) Retired
7	MF	Franco Causio	1 February 1949 (aged 40)	63	(Italy) Retired
8	DF	Francesco Morini	12 August 1944 (aged 45)	11	(Italy) Retired
9	FW	Roberto Pruzzo	1 April 1955 (aged 34)	6	(Italy) Retired
10	MF	Giancarlo Antognoni	1 April 1954 (aged 35)	73	(Italy) Retired
11	MF	Claudio Sala	8 September 1947 (aged 42)	18	(Italy) Retired
12	GK	Massimo Mattolini	29 May 1953 (aged 36)	-	(Italy) Retired
14	MF	Alessandro Scanziani	23 March 1953 (aged 36)	-	(Italy) Retired
13	FW	Francesco Graziani	16 December 1952 (aged 37)	64	(Italy) Retired
4	DF	Mauro Bellugi	7 February 1950 (aged 39)	32	(Italy) Retired
16	FW	Franco Selvaggi	19 May 1953 (aged 36)	3	(Italy) Retired
15	DF	Renato Zaccarelli	18 January 1951 (aged 38)	25	(Italy) Retired
18	MF	Roberto Tavola	7 August 1957 (aged 32)	-	(Italy) Seo Borgaro Torinese
19	DF	Luciano Marangon	27 October 1956 (aged 33)	1	(Italy) Retired
21	MF	Alberto Michelotti	15 July 1930 (aged 59)	-	(Italy) Retired
20	FW	Paolo Rossi	23 September 1956 (aged 33)	48	(Italy) Retired

Players who were called up but did travel to said tournament:*(N°17)MF

- (N°22)GK *(N°23)DF

=== Argentina ===
Head coach: (Argentina) Carmelo Faraone

No.	Pos.	Player	Date of birth (age)	Caps	Club
1	GK	Enrique Vidallé	7 May 1952 (aged 37)	6	(Argentina) Retired
2	DF	Luis Galván	24 February 1948 (aged 41)	34	(Argentina) Retired
23	MF	Victor Bottaniz	12 May 1953 (aged 36)	3	(Argentina) Retired
4	MF	Carlos Squeo	4 June 1948 (aged 41)	9	(Argentina) Retired
5	MF	Jose Orlando Berta	19 April 1952 (aged 37)	1	(Argentina) Retired
6	DF	Daniel Killer	21 December 1949 (aged 40)	22	(Argentina) Retired
7	FW	Fernando Alí	10 May 1954 (aged 35)	-	(Argentina) Retired
8	MF	Miguel Ángel Brindisi	8 October 1950 (aged 39)	46	(Argentina) Retired
9	FW	Norberto Outes	10 October 1953 (aged 36)	1	(Argentina) Retired
10	MF	Ricardo Villa	18 August 1952 (aged 37)	17	(Argentina) Retired
16	MF	Daniel Brailovsky	18 November 1958 (aged 31)	18	(Israel) Retired
12	GK	Héctor Baley	16 November 1950 (aged 39)	13	(Argentina) Retired
13	FW	Oscar Más	28 October 1946 (aged 43)	37	(Argentina) Retired
15	DF	Jorge Olguín	17 May 1952 (aged 37)	60	(Argentina) Retired
11	FW	Daniel Bertoni	14 March 1955 (aged 34)	31	(Argentina) Retired
3	DF	Roberto Mouzo	8 January 1953 (aged 37)	4	(Argentina) Retired
21	MF	Enzo Bulleri	3 November 1956 (aged 33)	1	(Argentina) Retired
17	FW	Oscar Ortiz	8 April 1953 (aged 36)	23	(Argentina) Retired
14	FW	Leopoldo Luque	3 March 1949 (aged 40)	43	(Argentina) Retired

Players who were called up but did travel to said tournament:*(N°18)GK

- (N°19)DF *(N°20)FW *(N°22)DF
