= Paul Postuma =

Dutch footballer (born 1956)

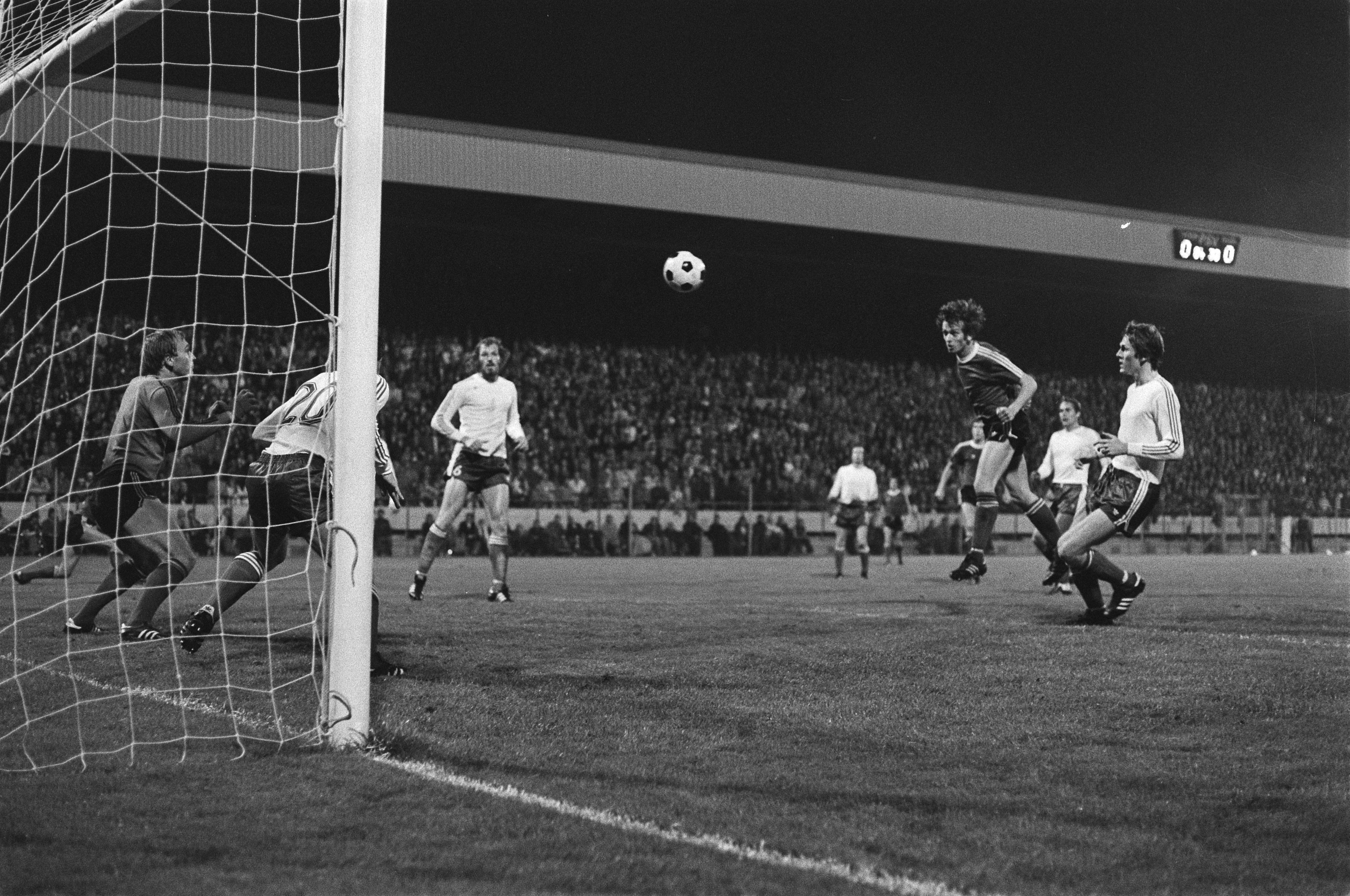
- Postuma scoring a header

Personal information
- Full name: Paulus Hugo Maria Postuma
- Date of birth: 22 January 1956 (age 70)
- Place of birth: Helenaveen, Netherlands
- Position: Striker

Youth career
- –1973: DOSL

Senior career*
Years	Team	Apps	(Gls)
1973–1981	PSV	99	(39)
1975–1976	→ FC Eindhoven (loan)	0	(0)
1981–1983	Berchem Sport		
1983–1986	Lierse SK		

International career
1973	Netherlands U19	1	(0)
- * Club domestic league appearances and goals

Paul Postuma (born 22 January 1956) is a Dutch retired footballer who played as a striker.

== Club career ==
Postuma started playing football with amateur side DOSL from Leende and joined PSV in 1973. He would play 8 years for the club and scored in the 3–0 1978 UEFA Cup semi-final win against Barcelona. PSV eventually won but Postuma did not feature in both final games. Postuma also famously scored a hattrick in an away game against Feyenoord in 1980. It was only after 46 years that Ismael Saibari was the next PSV player to accomplish that.

He moved to Belgium in 1981 and had spells at Berchem Sport where he played alongside Dick Advocaat and future international referee Dick Jol, and Lierse SK. A torn cruciate ligament ended his career prematurely.

== International career ==
Postuma played once for the Netherlands national under-19 football team.

== Honours ==
PSV

- Eredivisie: 1978
