= 1977–78 Bulgarian Cup =

Tournament details
- Country: Bulgaria

Final positions
- Champions: Marek Dupnitsa (1st cup)
- Runners-up: CSKA Sofia

Tournament statistics
- Top goal scorer(s): Nikolay Kurbanov (Akademik Svishtov) (6 goals)

The 1977–78 Bulgarian Cup was the 38th season of the Bulgarian Cup (in this period the tournament was named Cup of the Soviet Army). Marek Dupnitsa won the competition, beating CSKA Sofia 1–0 in the final at the Vasil Levski National Stadium.

== First round ==
Team 1	Score	Team 2
10 December 1977
Chernomorets Balchik	1–0 (a.e.t.)	Dobrudzha Dobrich
Rodopa Smolyan	1–0	Spartak Koynare
Energiya Targovishte	1–2	Chernomorets Burgas
Botev Galabovo	0–4	Botev Plovdiv
Lokomotiv GO	2–0	Vihren Sandanski
Balkan Botevgrad	0–3	CSKA Sofia
Dunav Ruse	13–0	Botev Krivodol
Botev Vratsa	6–0	Hebar Pazardzhik
Chepinets Velingrad	4–2	Botev Ihtiman
Arda Kardzhali	1–4	Sliven
Maritsa Plovdiv	4–1	Lokomotiv Mezdra
Minyor Radnevo	2–1	Belasitsa Petrich
Levski Sofia	6–1	Balkan Tvarditsa
Beloslav	1–0	Chavdar Troyan
Asenovets Asenovgrad	0–1	Cherno More Varna
Shumen	2–1	Pavlikeni
Lokomotiv Plovdiv	4–2 (a.e.t.)	Litex Lovech
Lokomotiv Sofia	4–0	Trakia Stamboliyski
Minyor Pernik	3–2	Chirpan
Marek Dupnitsa	4–1	Spartak Pleven
Montana	3–1	Rozova Dolina
Rakovski Sevlievo	4–0	Minyor Madzharovo
Bdin Vidin	3–4 (a.e.t.)	Akademik Sofia
Dimitrovgrad	5–1	Balkan Belogradchik
Akademik Svishtov	4–0	Yantra Gabrovo
Benkovski Isperih	8–2	Strumska Slava
Haskovo	1–0	Beroe Stara Zagora
Slivnishki Geroy	2–0	Tundzha Yambol
Dorostol Silistra	1–3	Spartak Varna
Slavia Sofia	1–0	Velbazhd Kyustendil
Svetkavitsa	2–1	Lokomotiv Ruse
Pirin Blagoevgrad	1–3	Etar Veliko Tarnovo

== Second round ==
Team 1	Score	Team 2
17 December 1977
CSKA Sofia	2–1	Dunav Ruse
Rodopa Smolyan	3–1	Chernomorets Burgas
Botev Plovdiv	2–0	Lokomotiv GO
Minyor Radnevo	0–1	Levski Sofia
Sliven	3–3 (a.e.t.) (5–4 p)	Maritsa Plovdiv
Beloslav	2–0	Cherno More Varna
Shumen	4–1	Lokomotiv Plovdiv
Lokomotiv Sofia	2–0	Minyor Pernik
Marek Dupnitsa	3–0	Montana
Rakovski Sevlievo	3–2 (a.e.t.)	Akademik Sofia
Dimitrovgrad	1–4	Akademik Svishtov
Benkovski Isperih	3–0	Haskovo
Svetkavitsa	0–3	Slavia Sofia
Slivnishki Geroy	2–0	Spartak Varna
Chepinets Velingrad	4–3	Etar Veliko Tarnovo
Botev Vratsa	4–0	Chernomorets Balchik

== Third round ==
Team 1	Score	Team 2	Place
11 February 1978
Levski Sofia	3–0	Beloslav	Nova Zagora
Marek Dupnitsa	1–0	Rakovski Sevlievo	Karnobat
Slivnishki Geroy	0–1	Slavia Sofia	Pernik
CSKA Sofia	1–0	Botev Vratsa	Pazardzhik
Shumen	1–3	Lokomotiv Sofia	Dimitrovgrad
Rodopa Smolyan	0–2	Botev Plovdiv	Kardzhali
Akademik Svishtov	4–1	Benkovski Isperih	Parvomay
Chepinets Velingrad	4–0 (w/o)	Sliven	Chirpan

== Quarter-finals ==
Team 1	Score	Team 2	Place
18 February 1978
Botev Plovdiv	0–1	CSKA Sofia	Ihtiman
Chepinets Velingrad	1–1 (a.e.t.) (4–2 p)	Levski Sofia	Karlovo
Akademik Svishtov	3–1 (a.e.t.)	Slavia Sofia	Botevgrad
Lokomotiv Sofia	1–2	Marek Dupnitsa	Pernik

== Semi-finals ==
Team 1	Score	Team 2	Place
10 May 1978
Marek Dupnitsa	2–0	Akademik Svishtov	Botevgrad
CSKA Sofia	1–1 (a.e.t.) (4–3 p)	Chepinets Velingrad	Sofia

== Final ==
=== Details ===
24 May 1978

CSKA Sofia	0−1	Marek Dupnitsa
		Sevdin 30'

Vasil Levski National Stadium, Sofia
Attendance: 40,000
Referee: Valentin Lipatov (USSR)

CSKA	Marek
