= Georgi Sapinev =

Bulgarian footballer

Personal information
- Date of birth: 8 January 1943 (age 83)
- Place of birth: Dupnitsa, Bulgaria
- Position: Midfielder

Senior career*
Years	Team	Apps	(Gls)
1961–1972	Marek Dupnitsa	232	(47)

International career
	Bulgaria	2	(0)
- * Club domestic league appearances and goals

Georgi Sapinev (Bulgarian: Георги Сапинев; born 8 January 1943) is a Bulgarian retired football player. Sapinev was an offensive midfielder. He played for Marek Dupnitsa between 1961 and 1972 and earned 232 caps and scored 47 goals.
