= Ivaylo Pargov =

Bulgarian footballer and manager

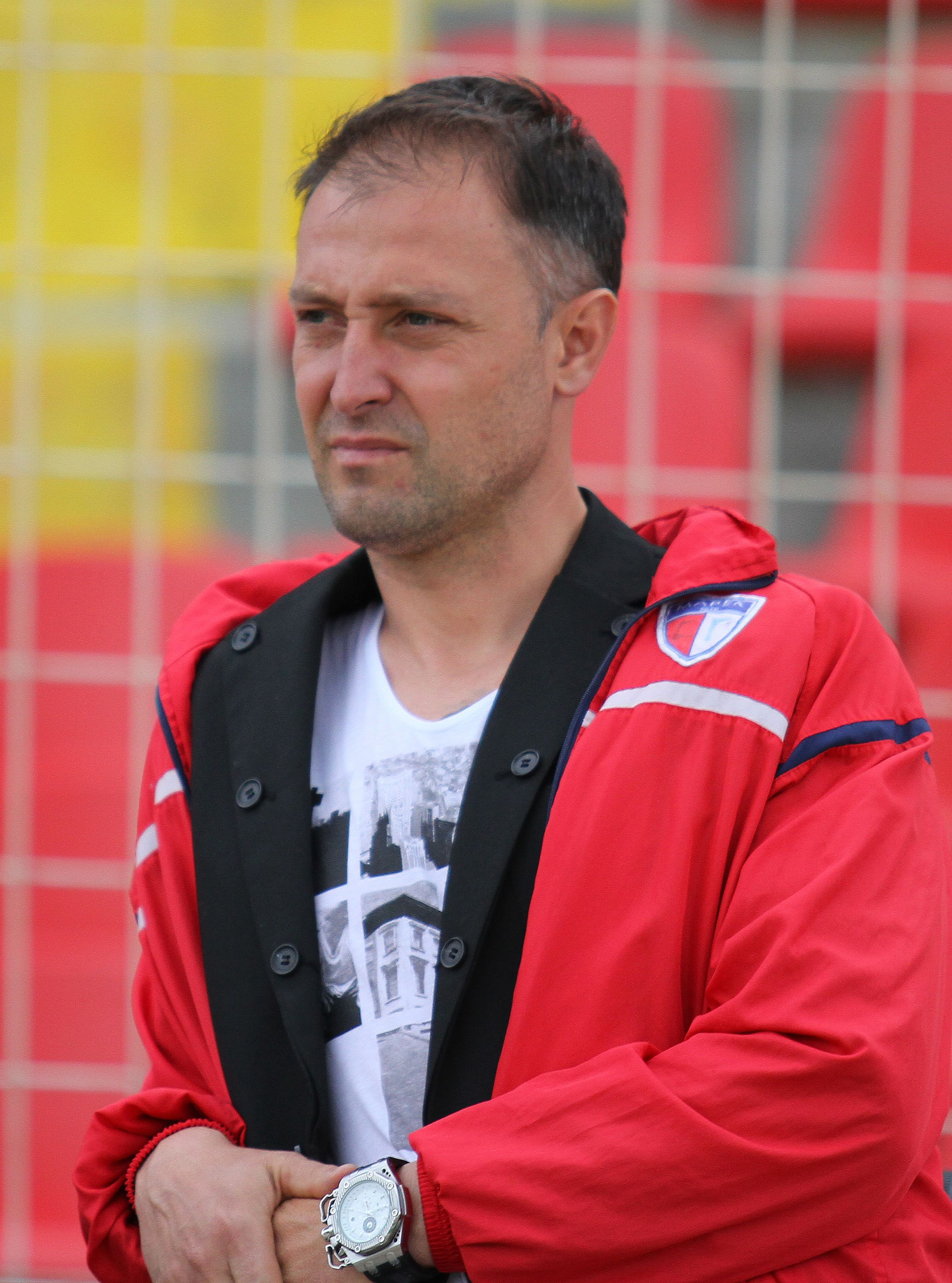

Personal information
- Full name: Ivaylo Sashov Pargov
- Date of birth: 21 August 1974 (age 52)
- Place of birth: Dupnitsa, Bulgaria
- Height: 1.86 m (6 ft 1 in)
- Position: Forward

Youth career
- Marek

Senior career*
Years	Team	Apps	(Gls)
1992–1995	Marek Dupnitsa	14	(3)
1995–1998	Minyor Pernik	80	(21)
1998–2001	Lokomotiv Sofia	43	(12)
2001–2002	Marek Dupnitsa	19	(5)
2002–2003	Lokomotiv Sofia	22	(6)
2003–2005	Marek Dupnitsa	44	(14)
2005	Anagennisi	14	(5)
2006	Marek Dupnitsa	14	(7)
2006–2007	Naftex Burgas	25	(14)
2007–2008	Marek Dupnitsa	18	(4)
2008–2009	Beroe Stara Zagora	15	(7)
2009–2010	Marek Dupnitsa	?	(?)

International career
1994–1996	Bulgaria U21	9	(0)

Managerial career
- 2013–2014: Marek Dupnitsa
- * Club domestic league appearances and goals

Ivaylo Sashov Pargov (Bulgarian: Ивайло Сашов Паргов, born 21 August 1974) is a Bulgarian former footballer who played as a forward. He has been the academy manager of Lokomotiv Sofia from 2015 to 2023 and became Chief Executive Officer of Marek Dupnitsa since January 2024.

== Career ==
Pargov's first club was Marek Dupnitsa. In his career he also played in Minyor Pernik, Lokomotiv Sofia, Greek Anagennisi Giannitsa and Naftex Burgas. On 1 July 2008 Ivaylo Pargov signed a contract with Beroe Stara Zagora.

== International career ==
Between 1994 and 1996 Pargov played for Bulgaria U21.

== Personal ==
He is a son of Sasho Pargov and uncle of Sylvester Jasper.
