= Thomas Töpfer =

East German footballer

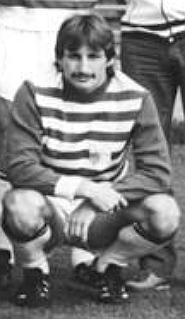
- Thomas Toepfer, 1983

Personal information
- Date of birth: 27 May 1958 (age 68)
- Place of birth: Saalfeld, East Germany
- Height: 1.78 m (5 ft 10 in)
- Position: Midfielder

Youth career
- 1974–1975: FC Carl Zeiss Jena

Senior career*
Years	Team	Apps	(Gls)
1976–1984	FC Carl Zeiss Jena	161	(19)
1985–1989	BSG Wismut Gera		
1989–1990	BSG JENAer Glaswerk		

International career
1986	East Germany U-21	9	(0)
- * Club domestic league appearances and goals

Thomas Töpfer (born 27 May 1958, in Saalfeld) is a retired East German footballer who played as a midfielder.
