= Juani =

Spanish footballer (born 1955)

Personal information
- Full name: Juan José Castillo Barreto
- Date of birth: 3 October 1955 (age 71)
- Place of birth: Las Palmas, Spain
- Height: 1.70 m (5 ft 7 in)
- Position: Midfielder

Senior career*
Years	Team	Apps	(Gls)
1974–1983	Las Palmas	223	(55)
1983–1984	Mallorca	35	(0)
1984–1985	CD Málaga	18	(2)
1985–1987	Las Palmas	61	(4)
1987–1989	Telde	65	(11)

International career
1976	Spain Olympic	1	(0)
1978	Spain U21	1	(0)
1980	Spain B	1	(0)
- * Club domestic league appearances and goals as of 23:21, 4 November 2021 (UTC)

Juan José Castillo Barreto (born 3 October 1955), better known as just Juani, is a Spanish footballer. He competed in the men's tournament at the 1976 Summer Olympics.
