= Henk van Rijnsoever =

Dutch footballer

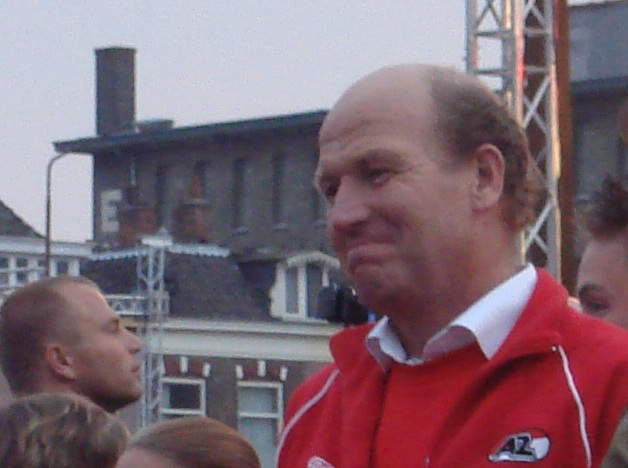
- Hendrikus van Rijnsoever in 2009

Personal information
- Full name: Hendrikus van Rijnsoever
- Date of birth: 6 November 1952 (age 73)
- Place of birth: Utrecht, Netherlands
- Position: Defender

Senior career*
Years	Team	Apps	(Gls)
1974–1982	AZ '67 Alkmaar	165	(12)

International career
1975	Netherlands	1	(0)
- * Club domestic league appearances and goals

Hendrikus van Rijnsoever (born 6 November 1952) is a Dutch former footballer who played as a defender for AZ '67 Alkmaar. He made one appearance for the Netherlands national team in 1975.
