= FC Marek Dupnitsa =

Association football club in Bulgaria

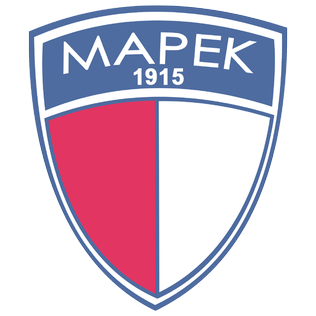
- Full name: Football Club Marek Dupnitsa
- Founded: 1915; 111 years ago
- Ground: Stadion Bonchuk
- Capacity: 16,000
- Coordinates: 42°16′31.1″N 23°8′8.3″E
- Chairman: Ivaylo Pargov
- Head coach: Aleksandar Aleksandrov
- League: Second League
- 2025–26: Second League, 9th of 17
- Website: marek1915.com
Home colours	Away colours

FC Marek (Bulgarian: ФК Марек) is a Bulgarian football club based in Dupnitsa, currently playing in the Second League, the second level of the Bulgarian football league system. It was founded in 1947 following the unification of four local clubs. Home matches take place at Bonchuk Stadium, where Marek famously defeated Bayern Munich in 1977. Bonchuk stadium has a capacity of 16,000.

Marek was founded in 1947, following the unification of four local clubs from Dupnitsa. Marek was one of the ten clubs that took part in the inaugural season of the A Group, the newly formed unified league of Bulgaria, in 1948. Since then, Marek has played a total of 29 seasons in the top level of Bulgarian football, most recently in 2015. Marek's most successful period came during the late 1970s, when the club competed in two successive European competitions. Marek managed to defeat Ferencvárosi TC and obtain a home win against FC Bayern Munich in the UEFA Cup, who had been crowned European champions just two seasons before that. Marek then played in the 1978–79 European Cup Winners' Cup, virtue of winning the domestic cup, against Aberdeen, also winning at home.

== Honours ==
=== Domestic ===
- First League:
  - Third place (2): 1948, 1976–77
- Bulgarian Cup:
  - Winners (1): 1978
- Second League:
  - Winners (1): 2013–14
- Third league:
  - Winners (1): 2022–23

== History ==
=== Early history (1919–1947) ===
The people of Dupnitsa watched football being played for the first time by foreign troops stationed in the city during World War I. Over the next several years, four clubs were founded in the city: Slavia, Levski, ZHSK, and Athletic. In 1923, these clubs participated in the formation of the Southwest Football League and, between 1935 and 1944, they frequently took part in the finals of the national tournaments. By 1944, each of the four had their own stadium.

=== Marek (1947–1970) ===
1947–1970

In 1947, Slavia, Levski, ZHSK, and Athletic decided to merge into one club, which was named Marek, after the nickname of Stanke Dimitrov, a local hero of the Bulgarian Communist Party. Marek is an abbreviation of "Marxist, Antifascist, Revolutionary, Emigrant, Communist."

In 1948, Marek became a part of the newly created first division, the Bulgarian A PFG, finishing eighth out of ten clubs in season 1948–49. The club was relegated to 2nd division, B PFG, in 1950. Marek subsequently won promotions to the Bulgarian A PFG in 1952 and 1956, followed by immediate relegation to B PFG the following seasons, 1953 and 1957, respectively. During these years, Marek's greatest achievement was 5th place in the Bulgarian A PFG during the 1960–61 season. The team's coach at that time was Lyuben Petrov. Up until the mid-1970s, Marek bounced back and forth between the first and second divisions of Bulgarian football.

=== Success in Bulgaria and Europe (1975–1981) ===
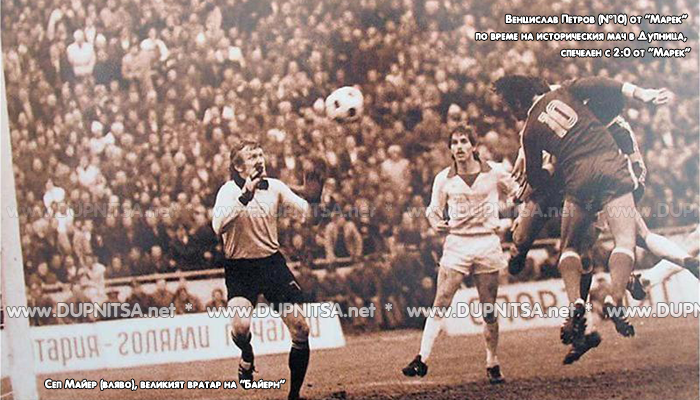
Marek vs. Bayern in 1977

The most notable successes for Marek came in the late 1970s and early 1980s when the club finished third in the league in 1977 and won the cup in 1978, defeating overwhelming favorites CSKA Sofia 1:0 in front of 75,000 spectators at the Vasil Levski National Stadium in Sofia.

During the 1976–77 season, Marek defeated CSKA twice, home and away, with the scores 2:1 and 3:1. That season, the club led the league for several rounds and at the end the team fought tooth and nail with Slavia Sofia for the third place in the table. Marek won the decisive game against Slavia in Dupnitsa by the score of 1:0, finishing 3rd and earning an entry into the 1977–78 UEFA Cup. This is Marek's best finish to date in the top flight of Bulgarian football.

In this period the team also played in Europe: UEFA Cup, Cup Winners' Cup, and Intertoto Cup. Victories include games against Bayern (a 2–0 victory), against Ferencváros of Hungary (a 3–0 victory), and against Aberdeen of Scotland (a 3–2 victory), then led by coach Alex Ferguson. The return leg in Scotland was tied 0–0 until late in the game, when substitute Gordon Strachan scored a goal and led his team to a 3–0 victory.

The club also competed in the 1980 Intertoto Cup against IFK Göteborg (2–3, 1–4) – a team that won the UEFA Cup just a year later;B 93 Copenhagen (2–0, 2–3), and Austria Salzburg (4–2, 2–2) to finish second in the group. The following season Marek once again competed in the Intertoto Cup-against Stuttgarter Kickers (0–1, 0–2), Viking (1–2, 0–3), and Willem II (0–1, 1–4) and finished last in its group.

Stadium and fans: The team is known for its loyal supporters and the local stadium "Bonchuk Stadium" is infamous for being a difficult place for visiting teams. "Bonchuk Stadium" holds 16,050 people. The town of Dupnitsa was known as the "city on wheels", because thousands of loyal Marek fans would follow the team at away games to remote parts of Bulgaria.

Famous players: Among the most famous players of Marek are Kiril Milanov, Dimitar Isakov, Nikolay "Shultz" Krastev, Sasho Pargov, Ivan and Ventzi Petrov, Stoyan Stoyanov (a goalkeeper), Asen Tomov, and Dimitre Dimitrov-Miki. The coach associated with the successes of Marek is Yanko Dinkov.

=== Recent history (2001–2010) ===
1998–2004

In 1983, Marek was relegated to B PFG and then the third division of Bulgarian football. After over a decade of playing in the lower divisions, in 2001 Marek returned triumphantly to the Bulgarian A PFG, for the 2001–02 season.

As a participant in the Intertoto Cup, Marek tied 1–1 the German Bundesliga club VfL Wolfsburg in 2003, but lost away from home the second leg, 0–2, and was eliminated from the tournament. The team finished 7th at the conclusion of the 2003–04 season, 9th at the end of the 2004–05 season, 11th after the 2005–06 season, and 12th at the end of the 2006–07 football season of the Bulgarian premier division, Bulgarian A PFG (out of 16 teams). In 2006–07, Marek secured its place in the Bulgarian top division for the next season with a 1–0 home win over the powerhouse CSKA Sofia.

During the 2007–08 season, Marek was plagued by injuries of key players, several coaching changes and a not-so-well covered conflict between the senior players of the club: Angelo and Yanek Kyuchukov and the club president, Yordan Andreev. Further, the team sold their best and most talented player, Enyo Krastovchev, to Levski Sofia. As a result, the team finished in last place, 16th, with only 5 wins in 30 games, in the domestic league, and was relegated to B PFG for the 2008–09 season.

Before the start of the 2008–09 season in B PFG, the team held its pre-season training in France in an attempt by the club president Andreev to compile a team made up exclusively of young foreign players. The team even had a Portuguese coach for the first few games of the season. The regular season started disastrously for Marek. After several consecutive losses, the Portuguese coach was fired, and all but one of the foreign players left the club.

Marek barely survived the 2008–09 season in B PFG, finishing 14th out of 16 teams, winning only 7 out of 30 regular season games, scoring 29 and conceding 48 goals.

During the 2009–10 season in B PFG, the team was coached by Velin Kostadinov and player-manager Angelo Kyuchukov. The team found more consistency and finished comfortably in 10th place with 41 points.

=== A New Beginning (2010–) ===
The Bulgarian Football Federation denied Marek the license to compete in B Group for the 2010–11 season due to the team's financial debts. Thus, the club had to start over and compete at the lowest level of Bulgarian football, in the regional amateur league, Zona Rila. The team's new coach became Ivaylo Pargov, a former player for the team.

During the 2010–11 season, Marek dominated the local amateur division and after winning all but one of its regular season games, thus earning a playoff game against Belasitsa Petrich for the right to play in the third division, V AFG. The play-off game was tied after 90 minutes, 1–1, and Belasitsa went on to win on penalties.

Despite the lost playoff and the prospect of spending a second season in the regional amateur league, a number of third division teams declined participation prior to the upcoming 2011–12 season due to financial insolvency. Thus, Marek was administratively promoted to the third division, for the 2011–12 season.

During the 2012–13 season, Marek finished first in the Southwest V AFG and earned automatic promotion to the Bulgarian Second Division, B PFG

Marek surprised its fans with the 2013–14 season in the Second Division, dominating its opponents and securing promotion to A PFG with four games to go, this returning to the top level after a six-year absence.

The return to A PFG proved difficult as Marek finished the 2014–2015 season in 11th place out of 12 teams, and the team was relegated. Marek won only six games the entire season, vs. Haskovo three times, at Cherno More and vs. Slavia Sofia.

After the conclusion of the 2014–2015 season, Marek did not receive a professional license from the Bulgarian Football Federation due to unpaid financial obligations to government institutions, and the team was relegated to the amateur divisions.

Subsequently, Marek was fined by the Bulgarian Football Federation due to "suspicion" of match fixing and the club ownership decided to dissolve the existing club and register a new FC Marek 1915, which started competing from the lowest level of football in Bulgaria, 4th regional division, during the 2015–2016 season.

Following an undefeated season, and navigating through two rounds of playoffs, Marek earned a promotion to the 3rd division for season 2016–17.

After several years in the third division, Marek returned to the Second League for season 2021–2022. Despite a brave effort, Marek did not manage to secure safety in the second level, suffering immediate relegation. The team had a chance to stay in the second tier up until the penultimate round.

In 2023, Marek returned to the Second League after just one season in the third level, comfortably finishing in first place in the Southwest Third League promotion group. In their first season back in the Second League, Marek turned out to be a surprising contender for promotion to the First League, being almost the entire season within the top three places. Eventually Marek finished third, qualifying for the promotion playoff, against Botev Vratsa. Botev Vratsa was the host of the playoff, by virtue of being the team from the First League. Botev managed to score in the 50th minute, when Martin Smolenski opened the scoreline. Marek, however, managed to equalize in the 83th minute, when a defensive error enabled Aleksandar Bliznakov to chip the goalie and put the ball in the net. With no winner after regular time, the game went to overtime. With still no winner, a penalty shootout had to be played. Marek lost the shootout, 4-2, and thus failed to promote to the top level.

== Marek in Europe ==
=== UEFA cup ===
Season	Competition	Round	Country	Club	Home	Away	Aggregate
1977–78	UEFA Cup	1	(Hungary)	Ferencváros	3–0	0–2	3–2
		2	(Germany)	Bayern Munich	2–0	0–3	2–3

=== Cup Winners' Cup ===
Season	Competition	Round	Country	Club	Home	Away	Aggregate
1978–79	Cup Winners' Cup	1	(Scotland)	Aberdeen	3–2	0–3	3–5

=== Intertoto Cup ===
Year	Stage	Match	Results
1980	group	Marek Dupnitsa – (Sweden) IFK Göteborg	2–3, 1–4
1980	group	Marek Dupnitsa – Austria Salzburg	4–2, 2–2
1980	group	Marek Dupnitsa – (Denmark) B 93 Copenhagen	2–0, 2–3
1981	group	Marek Dupnitsa – (Germany) Stuttgarter Kickers	0–1, 0–2
1981	group	Marek Dupnitsa – (Norway) Viking	1–2, 0–3
1981	group	Marek Dupnitsa – (Netherlands) Willem II	0–1, 1–4
2002	1/32	Marek Dupnitsa – (Wales) Caersws FC	2–0, 1–1
2002	1/16	(Israel) FC Ashdod – Marek Dupnitsa	1–1, 0–1
2002	1/8	Marek Dupnitsa – (Croatia) Slaven Belupo	0–3, 1–3
2003	1/32	(Hungary) Videoton – Marek Dupnitsa	2–2, 1–1
2003	1/16	Marek Dupnitsa – (Germany) VfL Wolfsburg	1–1, 0–2
2004	1/32	Marek Dupnitsa – (Georgia (country)) FC Dila Gori	0–0, 2–0
2004	1/16	(Belgium) Genk – Marek Dupnitsa	2–1, 0–0

== Players ==
=== Current squad ===
As of 9 July 2026

Note: Flags indicate national team as defined under FIFA eligibility rules; some limited exceptions apply. Players may hold more than one non-FIFA nationality.

No.	Pos.	Nation	Player
1	GK	BUL	Vladimir Borisov
2	DF	BUL	Nikolay Plyakov
3	DF	BUL	Mario Petkov
8	MF	BUL	Valeri Yordanov
9	FW	BUL	Boycho Velichkov
10	MF	BUL	Nikolay Ganchev
11	FW	SRB	Marko Miletić (on loan from Slavia Sofia)
12	GK	BUL	Plamen Mladenov
13	MF	BUL	Veselin Lyubomirov
16	MF	BUL	Simeon Mechev
18	FW	BUL	Rosen Yordanov
19	FW	BUL	Dimitar Goranov
20	MF	BUL	Anzhelo Kyuchukov

No.	Pos.	Nation	Player
21	GK	BUL	Konstantin Kostadinov
22	FW	BUL	Martin Georgiev
23	DF	BUL	Emil Viyachki
27	MF	BUL	Nikola Todorov
33	DF	BUL	Daniel Kirilov
38	DF	BUL	Aleksandar Dyulgerov
44	DF	BUL	Hristo Kaymakanski
55	DF	BUL	Rumen Sandev
71	MF	BUL	Kiril Kaninski
72	DF	BUL	Martin Krastev
88	MF	NGR	Emmanuel Ajoku
90	FW	BUL	Petar Kirev

For recent transfers, see Transfers winter 2025–26 and Transfers summer 2026.

== Notable players ==
- For all players with a Wikipedia article see Category:FC Marek Dupnitsa players.

Had international caps for their respective countries, held any club record, or had more than 100 league appearances. Players whose name is listed in bold represented their countries.

Bulgaria

- (Bulgaria) **Krum Bibishkov**
- (Bulgaria) **Velizar Dimitrov**
- (Bulgaria) **Georgi Enisheynov**
- (Bulgaria) **Anton Evtimov**
- (Bulgaria) Svetoslav Georgiev
- (Bulgaria) **Dimitar Isakov**

Dimitar Dimitrov-Miki

- (Bulgaria) **Biser Ivanov**
- (Bulgaria) Milen Ivanov
- (Bulgaria) Dimitar Koemdzhiev
- (Bulgaria) Enyo Krastovchev
- (Bulgaria) **Emil Kremenliev**
- (Bulgaria) Anzhelo Kyuchukov
- (Bulgaria) Yanek Kyuchukov
- (Bulgaria) **Kiril Milanov**
- (Bulgaria) **Dobromir Mitov**
- (Bulgaria) **Daniel Mladenov**
- (Bulgaria) Ivaylo Pargov
- (Bulgaria) Sasho Pargov
- (Bulgaria) **Georgi Sapinev**
- (Bulgaria) Lyuben Sevdin
- (Bulgaria) **Veselin Shulev**
- (Bulgaria) **Ivo Slavchev**
- (Bulgaria) **Yanko Valkanov**
- (Bulgaria) **Veselin Velikov**
- (Bulgaria) Emil Viyachki
- (Bulgaria) **Vladimir Yonkov**

Europe

- (Armenia) **Armen Ambartsumyan**
- (Georgia (country)) **Amiran Mujiri**
- (North Macedonia) **Sašo Lazarevski**

Africa

- (Cape Verde) **Paulo Soares**
- (Ivory Coast) **Serge Yoffou**
