= Ryszard Kowenicki =

Polish footballer (born 1948)

Personal information
- Full name: Ryszard Stefan Kowenicki
- Date of birth: 22 December 1948 (age 77)
- Place of birth: Łódź, Poland
- Height: 1.78 m (5 ft 10 in)
- Positions: Defender; attacking midfielder

Youth career
- 1957–: ŁKS Łódź

Senior career*
Years	Team	Apps	(Gls)
–1975	Start Łódź		
1975–1979	Widzew Łódź		
1979–1981	Oldham Athletic	42	(5)
1981–1983	Viborg FF		
1984–1985	Nakskov BK		
- * Club domestic league appearances and goals

Ryszard Stefan Kowenicki (born 22 December 1948) is a Polish former professional footballer. He played both as a defender and later as an attacking midfielder. He played football in Poland, most prominently for Widzew Łódź, before transferring to English club Oldham Athletic in 1979, and he later played in Denmark with both Viborg FF and Nakskov BK.

== Early life ==
Kowenicki was born in Łódź, Poland, on 22 December 1948. His father was from Lviv.

== Career ==
Kowenicki played youth football with ŁKS Łódź, but was moved to Start Łódź as a senior player, where he remained until joining Widzew Łódź in 1975. He was part of the Widzew Łódź team that took part in the 1977–78 UEFA Cup; he provided an assist in their first round victory over Manchester City, and scored in a second round defeat to PSV Eindhoven. He played in the UEFA Cup again in the 1979–80 season.

Kowenicki signed for English club Oldham Athletic in December 1979, for a transfer fee of around £15,000, making his debut for the club on 8 December 1979 in a home match against Chelsea. He scored 5 times in 42 league appearances for Oldham.

He was released by Oldham Athletic in summer 1981, following a falling-out with the club chairman over Kowenicki's request for an improved contract. He subsequently had a trial at Bradford City in August 1981. He instead moved to Denmark however, with the help of former Widzew teammate Tadeusz Gapiński, and signed for Viborg FF. He later played for Nakskov BK, before retiring in 1985.

== After football ==
Kowenicki settled in Denmark after the end of his playing career. Whilst living in Poland, he obtained a civil engineering degree from the Łódź University of Technology, and despite obtaining a master's degree from the Józef Piłsudski University of Physical Education, Warsaw in view of a career in football coaching, he continued to work as a civil engineer.

== Style of play ==
Throughout much of his career in Poland, Kowenicki played as a defender (though he would regularly join the attack), but he was used as an attacking midfielder at Oldham Athletic. During his time at Oldham, he was noted for powerful shots and also for his throw-in technique.
