= Martin Trocha =

German footballer

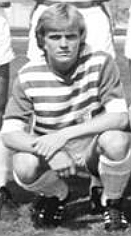
- Martin Trocha in 1978

Personal information
- Date of birth: 24 December 1957 (age 68)
- Place of birth: Bytom, Poland
- Height: 1.78 m (5 ft 10 in)
- Position: Striker

Youth career
- –1974: Szombierki Bytom
- 1974–1975: Carl Zeiss Jena

Senior career*
Years	Team	Apps	(Gls)
1975–1984	Carl Zeiss Jena	129	(20)
1984	Carl Zeiss Jena II		
1984–1985	Wismut Gera	9	(2)
1985–1987	Sachsenring Zwickau	52	(10)
1987–1989	Hallescher FC Chemie	34	(3)
1989–1990	Jenaer Glaswerk		

International career
1980–1982	East Germany	8	(1)
- * Club domestic league appearances and goals

Martin Trocha (born 24 December 1957) is a former German footballer.

== Club career ==
Trocha scored 26 goals in 175 East German top-flight appearances.

== International career ==
He appeared eight times for East Germany between 1980 and 1982.
