= Lyuben Sevdin =

Bulgarian footballer

Personal information
- Date of birth: 26 July 1953
- Place of birth: Dupnitsa, Bulgaria
- Date of death: September 21, 2013 (aged 60)
- Position: Right-back

Youth career
- Marek Dupnitsa

Senior career*
Years	Team	Apps	(Gls)
1971–1972	Marek Dupnitsa	14	(0)
1972–1973	Cherno More	2	(0)
1973–1982	Marek Dupnitsa	166	(2)
1982–1984	Dobrudzha Dobrich		
1984–1985	Germanea		
- * Club domestic league appearances and goals

Lyuben Sevdin (Bulgarian: Любен Севдин; 26 July 1953 – 21 September 2013) was a Bulgarian footballer. He was a defender who played from 1971 to 1985, most notably for Marek Dupnitsa.

The defining moment of his playing career came in the 1978 Bulgarian Cup Final, when he scored the winning goal for Marek against CSKA Sofia, producing one of the biggest Cup upsets. In his career he also played for Cherno More Varna, Dobrudzha Dobrich, and Germanea Sapareva Banya.

== Honours ==
Marek Dupnitsa

- Bulgarian Cup: 1977–78
