= 1976 Danish 1st Division =

31st season of Danish 1st Division

Danish 1st Division
- Season: 1976

Statistics of Danish 1st Division in the 1976 season.

== Overview ==
It was contested by 16 teams, and Boldklubben 1903 won the championship.

== League standings ==
Pos	Team	Pld	W	D	L	GF	GA	GD	Pts
1	Boldklubben 1903	30	16	8	6	51	29	+22	40
2	Boldklubben Frem	30	16	7	7	45	21	+24	39
3	Kjøbenhavns Boldklub	30	17	5	8	55	36	+19	39
4	Aalborg Boldspilklub	30	15	7	8	55	41	+14	37
5	Odense Boldklub	30	15	6	9	52	43	+9	36
6	Vejle Boldklub	30	16	3	11	59	40	+19	35
7	Holbæk B&I	30	14	7	9	38	33	+5	35
8	B 1901	30	13	6	11	52	51	+1	32
9	Køge BK	30	9	12	9	38	38	0	30
10	Kastrup Boldklub	30	9	8	13	38	45	−7	26
11	Esbjerg fB	30	9	7	14	37	47	−10	25
12	Randers Sportsklub Freja	30	9	6	15	41	50	−9	24
13	Boldklubben af 1893	30	8	7	15	33	43	−10	23
14	Næstved IF	30	7	7	16	36	54	−18	21
15	Fremad Amager	30	7	7	16	34	52	−18	21
16	Vanløse IF	30	6	5	19	46	87	−41	17

== Results ==
Home \ Away	AaB	B93	B01	B03	EfB	BKF	AMA	HOL	KAS	KB	KBK	NIF	OB	RSF	VIF	VBK
Aalborg BK	—	2–0	2–1	2–1	1–1	1–3	1–1	1–1	1–1	1–3	0–3	4–0	1–1	2–1	5–2	2–1
B.93	2–1	—	0–4	0–0	0–1	0–2	4–0	0–0	0–2	2–1	3–3	3–1	2–1	0–1	1–1	1–3
B 1901	5–0	1–0	—	2–1	2–0	0–1	3–1	1–2	5–2	2–2	1–1	0–2	2–2	2–1	5–3	2–0
B 1903	2–1	2–1	1–1	—	2–1	1–0	2–0	0–0	0–1	1–4	5–1	2–2	2–1	2–1	1–0	3–1
Esbjerg fB	0–3	3–1	2–3	1–1	—	1–1	2–1	0–2	0–0	1–4	6–1	2–1	2–1	2–3	1–4	1–2
BK Frem	0–0	1–2	3–1	1–0	2–0	—	3–0	2–0	2–0	1–1	2–1	1–3	0–1	0–0	3–0	3–2
Fremad Amager	1–3	0–0	2–2	2–2	0–1	1–0	—	1–2	3–4	1–2	4–2	3–1	1–2	1–0	2–0	0–4
Holbæk B&I	0–4	2–1	0–2	3–1	1–1	0–0	2–1	—	3–2	3–1	1–0	5–2	1–1	3–2	2–0	0–0
Kastrup BK	0–1	1–1	0–1	0–1	2–1	1–1	1–1	1–0	—	2–2	0–0	3–1	4–1	2–2	2–4	1–2
Kjøbenhavns BK	1–3	2–1	5–0	1–2	2–1	1–0	0–0	2–0	1–0	—	0–3	3–1	5–1	2–0	1–0	2–0
Køge BK	2–0	1–1	2–0	1–1	0–0	0–2	0–2	1–0	3–1	1–0	—	2–0	1–1	3–0	2–2	1–1
Næstved IF	1–1	0–2	4–1	0–0	0–1	0–0	2–1	0–2	2–0	1–2	0–0	—	1–2	1–4	4–2	3–1
Odense BK	3–0	2–0	3–0	0–4	4–1	4–0	1–0	1–0	2–0	4–1	0–0	3–1	—	3–1	5–2	0–3
Randers FC	2–3	0–3	3–0	0–6	1–1	0–3	2–2	0–2	1–2	1–1	0–0	2–0	1–0	—	6–0	2–0
Vanløse IF	1–5	3–2	2–2	1–3	1–3	0–6	1–2	3–1	1–0	1–2	3–2	1–1	2–2	2–4	—	1–7
Vejle BK	1–4	2–0	4–1	0–2	1–0	0–2	3–0	2–0	2–3	2–1	2–1	1–1	5–0	2–0	5–3	—

Legend: Blue = home team win; Yellow = draw; Red = away team win.
