= Torsten Andersen =

Danish footballer (born 1949)

Personal information
- Date of birth: 27 March 1949 (age 77)
- Place of birth: Copenhagen, Denmark
- Position: Forward

Senior career*
Years	Team	Apps	(Gls)
1970–1973	Akademisk Boldklub		
1973–1976	Anderlecht		
1976–1980	Kjøbenhavns Boldklub		
1981	Akademisk Boldklub		
1981–1982	Hellerup IK		

International career
1977–1979	Denmark	6	(1)
- * Club domestic league appearances and goals

Torsten Andersen (born 27 March 1949) is a Danish former footballer who played as a forward. He made six appearances for the Denmark national team from 1977 to 1979.
