= Gert Brauer =

German footballer (1955–2018)

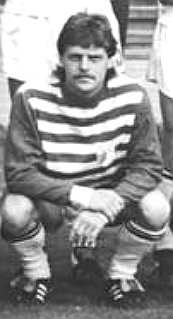
- Gert Brauer (1983)

Personal information
- Date of birth: 7 September 1955
- Place of birth: Ronneburg, East Germany
- Date of death: 19 January 2018 (aged 62)
- Position: Defender

Youth career
- –1970: Wismut Gera
- 1970–1973: Carl Zeiss Jena

Senior career*
| Years | Team | Apps | (Gls) |
| 1973–1987 | Carl Zeiss Jena | 253 | (9) |
| Total | | 253 | (9) |

International career
| 1979–1980 | East Germany | 4 | (0) |
- * Club domestic league appearances and goals

Gert Brauer (German pronunciation: [ɡɛʁt ˈbʁaʊɐ]; 7 September 1955 – 1 January 2018) was a German footballer.

== Club career ==
He played 270 Oberliga matches in East Germany.

== International career ==
Three of his four international matches for East Germany where part of the UEFA Euro 1980 qualifying.

== Personal life ==
Brauer died on 19 January 2018.
