= Henk Warnas =

Dutch footballer (born 1943)

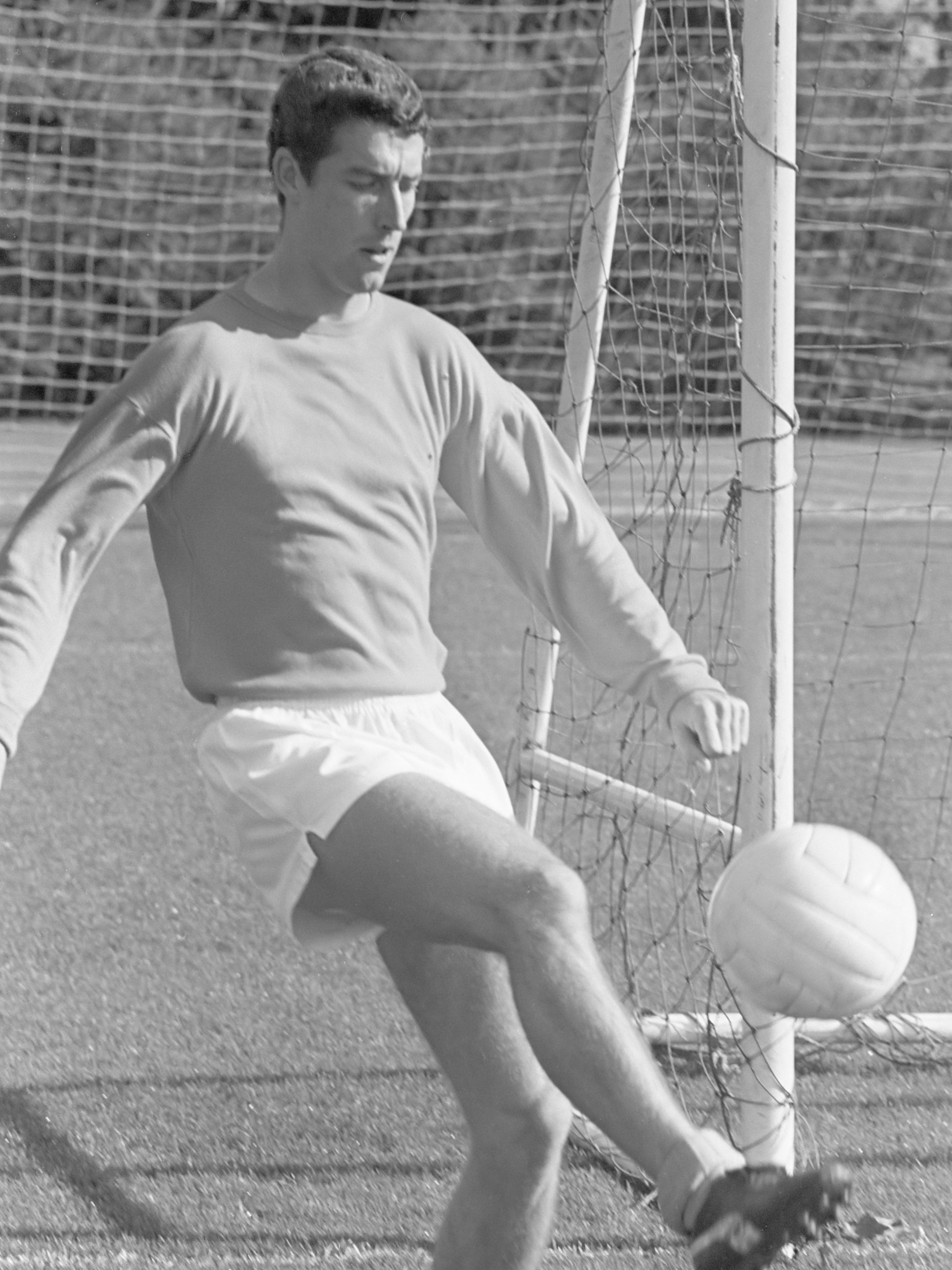
- Warnas in 1967

Personal information
- Full name: Hendrik Warnas
- Date of birth: 7 December 1943 (age 82)
- Place of birth: Slikkerveer, Netherlands
- Position: Defender

Senior career*
Years	Team	Apps	(Gls)
1963–1964	Feijenoord	1	(0)
1964–1976	Go Ahead Eagles	364	(8)
1976–1978	PEC Zwolle		

International career
1967–1968	Netherlands	5	(0)
- * Club domestic league appearances and goals

Hendrik Warnas (born 7 December 1943) is a Dutch former footballer who played as a defender. He made five appearances for the Netherlands national team from 1967 to 1968.
