= Sasho Pargov =

Bulgarian footballer (1946–2025)

- Pargov receiving a trophy (1970s)

Personal information
- Full name: Sasho Milchov Pargov
- Date of birth: 25 June 1946
- Place of birth: Boboshevo, Bulgaria
- Date of death: 20 July 2025 (aged 79)
- Place of death: Dupnitsa, Bulgaria
- Position: Forward

Senior career*
Years	Team	Apps	(Gls)
1964–1981	Marek Dupnitsa	465	(167)
- * Club domestic league appearances and goals

Sasho Milchov Pargov (Bulgarian: Сашо Милчов Паргов; 25 June 1946 – 20 July 2025) was a Bulgarian footballer who played as a central forward. He played with Marek Dupnitsa and earned 465 caps, scoring 167 goals. He also played in Marek's UEFA Cup Winners' Cup tie against Alex Ferguson's Aberdeen in 1978.

Pargov died on 20 July 2025, at the age of 79. His son, Ivo, is a former footballer who also played for Marek during his career.

== Honours ==
- Bulgarian Cup: 1978
- Championship's top goalscorer in B PFG: 1968 (21 goals), 1973 (27 goals)
