= 1980–81 UEFA Cup =

10th season of Europe's secondary club football tournament organised by UEFA

Tournament details
- Dates: 17 September 1980 – 20 May 1981
- Teams: 64

Final positions
- Champions: (England) Ipswich Town (1st title)
- Runners-up: (Netherlands) AZ Alkmaar

Tournament statistics
- Matches played: 126
- Goals scored: 376 (2.98 per match)
- Attendance: 2,354,939 (18,690 per match)
- Top scorer(s): John Wark (Ipswich Town); 14 goals

The 1980–81 UEFA Cup was the 10th edition of the UEFA Cup, the third-tier club football competition organised by UEFA. The final was played over two legs at Portman Road, Ipswich, England, and at the Olympic Stadium, Amsterdam, Netherlands. It was won by Ipswich Town of England, who defeated AZ Alkmaar of the Netherlands by an aggregate result of 5–4 to claim their only UEFA Cup title.

This was the only European title for Ipswich Town, who never made it past a quarterfinal round before, and would never go beyond the third round in future competitions. As of 2024, this has been the only appearance in a major European final for both teams, which was also the case with the finalists of the European Cup Winners' Cup that season. Both are the only current instances in a major UEFA tournament; it has also happened with the finalists of the 1968–69 Inter-Cities Fairs Cup, which is considered an unofficial tournament by UEFA.

The UEFA ranking was introduced to serve as the method to determine the number of competing teams per country, and the Fairs Cup entry criteria was finally abolished.

== Association team allocation ==
A total of 64 teams from 31 UEFA member associations participate in the 1980–81 UEFA Cup. For the first time, an association ranking based on the newly introduced UEFA country coefficients was used to determine the number of participating teams for each association:

- Associations 1–3 each have four teams qualify.
- Associations 4–8 each have three teams qualify.
- Associations 9–21 each have two teams qualify.
- Associations 22–32 each have one team qualify.

=== Association ranking ===
For the 1980–81 UEFA Cup, the associations are allocated places according to their 1979 UEFA country coefficients, which takes into account their performance in European competitions from 1974–75 to 1978–79.

Association ranking for 1980-81 UEFA Cup

| Rank | Association | Coeff. | Teams | Notes |
|---|---|---|---|---|
| 1 | West Germany | 52.617 | 5 | |
| 2 | Netherlands | 39.200 | 4 | |
| 3 | Belgium | 38.300 | 4 | |
| 4 | England | 38.141 | 3 | |
| 5 | Spain | 35.800 | 3 | |
| 6 | Soviet Union | 33.050 | 3 | |
| 7 | (Socialist Federal Republic of Yugoslavia) Yugoslavia | 28.250 | 3 | |
| 8 | East Germany | 26.650 | 3 | |
| 9 | Italy | 25.932 | 2 | |
| 10 | France | 24.250 | 2 | |
| 11 | Hungary | 22.650 | 2 | |
| 12 | Czechoslovakia | 21.500 | 2 | |
| 13 | Poland | 18.850 | 2 | |
| 14 | Portugal | 17.750 | 2 | |
| 15 | Austria | 17.700 | 2 | |
| 16 | Switzerland | 17.650 | 2 | |
| 17 | Scotland | 16.500 | 2 | |

| Rank | Association | Coeff. | Teams | Notes |
|---|---|---|---|---|
| 18 | Sweden | 15.400 | 2 | |
| - | Wales | 15.000 | 0 | |
| 19 | Greece | 15.000 | 2 | |
| 20 | Bulgaria | 13.200 | 2 | |
| 21 | Romania | 10.800 | 2 | |
| 22 | Turkey | 10.000 | 1 | |
| 23 | Denmark | 7.750 | 1 | |
| 24 | (Republic of Ireland) Republic of Ireland | 7.332 | 1 | |
| 25 | Norway | 6.250 | 1 | |
| 26 | Finland | 5.498 | 1 | |
| 27 | (Northern Ireland) Northern Ireland | 4.666 | 1 | |
| 28 | Cyprus | 3.999 | 1 | |
| 29 | Malta | 3.664 | 1 | |
| 30 | Iceland | 3.331 | 1 | |
| 31 | Albania | 2.000 | 0 | |
| 32 | Luxembourg | 1.666 | 1 | |

Wales: There was no national league in Wales before 1992 and the only competition organised by the Football Association of Wales was the Welsh Cup so Wales had just a single participant in European competitions, the winner (or best placed Welsh team as several English teams also competed) of the Welsh Cup which competed in the UEFA Cup Winners' Cup. Its virtual ranking is only an original research, because the UEFA country ranking was only used to allocate the UEFA Cup spots at time, so Wales was not included.
Albania: Until 1985, Albania frequently withdrew their allocated place in the UEFA Cup due to political reasons. 17 Nëntori would have qualified by league position. This additional place went to the country of the title holders, as Eintracht Frankfurt had not qualified by league position, giving West Germany a fifth entry in the UEFA Cup.

=== Teams ===
The labels in the parentheses show how each team qualified for competition:

- TH: Title holders
- CW: Cup winners
- CR: Cup runners-up
- LC: League Cup winners
- 2nd, 3rd, 4th, 5th, 6th, etc.: League position
- P-W: End-of-season European competition play-offs winners

Qualified teams for 1980–81 UEFA Cup
| (West Germany) Eintracht Frankfurt (TH) | (West Germany) Hamburger SV (2nd) | (West Germany) Stuttgart (3rd) | (West Germany) Kaiserslautern (4th) |
| (West Germany) Köln (5th) | (Netherlands) AZ Alkmaar (2nd) | (Netherlands) PSV Eindhoven (3rd) | (Netherlands) Utrecht (5th) |
| (Netherlands) Twente (6th) | (Belgium) Standard Liège (2nd) | (Belgium) Molenbeek (4th) | (Belgium) Lokeren (5th) |
| (Belgium) Anderlecht (6th) | (England) Manchester United (2nd) | (England) Ipswich Town (3rd) | (England) Wolverhampton (LC) |
| (Spain) Real Sociedad (2nd) | (Spain) Sporting de Gijón (3rd) | (Spain) Barcelona (4th) | (Soviet Union) Shakhtar Donetsk (2nd) |
| (Soviet Union) Dynamo Kyiv (3rd) | (Soviet Union) Dynamo Moscow (5th) | (Socialist Federal Republic of Yugoslavia) Sarajevo (2nd) | (Socialist Federal Republic of Yugoslavia) Radnički Niš (3rd) |
| (Socialist Federal Republic of Yugoslavia) Napredak Kruševac (4th) | (East Germany) Dynamo Dresden (2nd) | (East Germany) Magdeburg (4th) | (East Germany) Vorwärts Frankfurt (5th) |
| (Italy) Juventus (2nd) | (Italy) Torino (3rd) | (France) Sochaux (2nd) | (France) Saint-Étienne (3rd) |
| (Hungary) Újpest Dózsa (2nd) | (Hungary) Vasas (3rd) | (Czechoslovakia) Zbrojovka Brno (2nd) | (Czechoslovakia) Bohemians Prague (3rd) |
| (Poland) Widzew Łódź (2nd) | (Poland) Śląsk Wrocław (3rd) | (Portugal) Porto (2nd) | (Portugal) Boavista (4th) |
| (Austria) VÖEST Linz (2nd) | (Austria) LASK (3rd) | (Switzerland) Grasshoppers (2nd) | (Switzerland) Servette (3rd) |
| (Scotland) St Mirren (3rd) | (Scotland) Dundee United (4th) | (Sweden) IFK Göteborg (2nd) | (Sweden) Elfsborg (3rd) |
| (Greece) Aris (2nd) | (Greece) Panathinaikos (3rd) | (Bulgaria) Levski-Spartak Sofia (3rd) | (Bulgaria) Beroe Stara Zagora (4th) |
| (Romania) Steaua București (2nd) | (Romania) Argeș Pitești (3rd) | (Turkey) Fenerbahçe S.K. (2nd) | (Denmark) KB (2nd) |
| (Republic of Ireland) Dundalk (2nd) | (Norway) Moss (2nd) | (Finland) KuPS (2nd) | (Northern Ireland) Ballymena United (2nd) |
| (Cyprus) Pezoporikos Larnaca (2nd) | (Malta) Sliema Wanderers (2nd) | (Iceland) ÍA (2nd) | (Luxembourg) Red Boys Differdange (2nd) |

Notes

1. Italy: Milan had originally qualified for the UEFA Cup by finishing second in the 1979–80 Serie A, but the team was punished with an administrative relegation on May 19 due to its central role in the Totonero match fixing scandal. The vacant UEFA Cup spot was taken by Torino, which was promoted to third in the standings as a result of Milan's relegation.

== Schedule ==
The schedule of the competition was as follows. Matches were scheduled for Wednesdays, though some matches in the first two rounds exceptionally took place on Tuesdays.

Schedule for 1980–81 UEFA Cup
| Round | First leg | Second leg |
|---|---|---|
| First round | 16–17 September 1980 | 24 September – 1 October 1980 |
| Second round | 21–22 October 1980 | 4–5 November 1980 |
| Third round | 26 November 1980 | 10 December 1980 |
| Quarter-finals | 4 March 1981 | 18 March 1981 |
| Semi-finals | 8 April 1981 | 22 April 1981 |
| Final | 6 May 1981 | 20 May 1981 |

== First round ==
| Team 1 | Agg. | Team 2 | 1st leg | 2nd leg |
|---|---|---|---|---|
| Zbrojovka Brno (Czechoslovakia) | 5–1 | (Austria) VOEST Linz | 3–1 | 2–0 |
| Kaiserslautern (West Germany) | 3–3 (a) | (Belgium) Anderlecht | 1–0 | 2–3 |
| Magdeburg (East Germany) | 5–3 | (Norway) Moss | 2–1 | 3–2 |
| AZ Alkmaar (Netherlands) | 10–0 | (Luxembourg) Red Boys Differdange | 6–0 | 4–0 |
| Ballymena United (Northern Ireland) | 2–4 | (East Germany) Vorwärts Frankfurt | 2–1 | 0–3 |
| Dynamo Dresden (East Germany) | 2–0 | (Socialist Federal Republic of Yugoslavia) Napredak Kruševac | 1–0 | 1–0 |
| Argeș Pitești (Romania) | 0–2 | (Netherlands) Utrecht | 0–0 | 0–2 |
| Bohemians Prague (Czechoslovakia) | 4–3 | (Spain) Sporting Gijón | 3–1 | 1–2 |
| Dynamo Kyiv (Soviet Union) | 1–1 (a) | (Bulgaria) Levski Sofia | 1–1 | 0–0 |
| Shakhtar Donetsk (Soviet Union) | 1–3 | (West Germany) Eintracht Frankfurt | 1–0 | 0–3 |
| Sochaux (France) | 3–2 | (Switzerland) Servette | 2–0 | 1–2 |
| Twente (Netherlands) | 5–3 | (Sweden) IFK Göteborg | 5–1 | 0–2 |
| Fenerbahçe (Turkey) | 1–3 | (Bulgaria) Beroe Stara Zagora | 0–1 | 1–2 |
| Porto (Portugal) | 1–0 | (Republic of Ireland) Dundalk | 1–0 | 0–0 |
| Grasshopper (Switzerland) | 8–3 | (Denmark) KB | 3–1 | 5–2 |
| Hamburg (West Germany) | 7–5 | (Socialist Federal Republic of Yugoslavia) Sarajevo | 4–2 | 3–3 |
| Elfsborg (Sweden) | 1–2 | (Scotland) St Mirren | 1–2 | 0–0 |
| Ipswich Town (England) | 6–4 | (Greece) Aris | 5–1 | 1–3 |
| ÍA (Iceland) | 0–10 | (West Germany) Köln | 0–4 | 0–6 |
| Juventus (Italy) | 6–4 | (Greece) Panathinaikos | 4–0 | 2–4 |
| Lokeren (Belgium) | 2–1 | (Soviet Union) Dynamo Moscow | 1–1 | 1–0 |
| KuPS (Finland) | 0–14 | (France) Saint-Étienne | 0–7 | 0–7 |
| LASK Linz (Austria) | 2–6 | (Socialist Federal Republic of Yugoslavia) Radnički Niš | 1–2 | 1–4 |
| Manchester United (England) | 1–1 (a) | (Poland) Widzew Łódź | 1–1 | 0–0 |
| PSV Eindhoven (Netherlands) | 3–2 | (England) Wolverhampton Wanderers | 3–1 | 0–1 |
| Molenbeek (Belgium) | 3–4 | (Italy) Torino | 1–2 | 2–2 (a.e.t.) |
| Śląsk Wrocław (Poland) | 2–7 | (Scotland) Dundee United | 0–0 | 2–7 |
| Sliema Wanderers (Malta) | 0–3 | (Spain) Barcelona | 0–2 | 0–1 |
| Standard Liège (Belgium) | 3–2 | (Romania) Steaua București | 1–1 | 2–1 |
| Újpest (Hungary) | 1–2 | (Spain) Real Sociedad | 1–1 | 0–1 |
| Vasas (Hungary) | 1–2 | (Portugal) Boavista | 0–2 | 1–0 |
| Stuttgart (West Germany) | 10–1 | (Cyprus) Pezoporikos Larnaca | 6–0 | 4–1 |

=== First leg ===
17 September 1980

| Zbrojovka Brno (Czechoslovakia) | 3–1 | (Austria) VOEST Linz |
|---|---|---|
| Kroupa 15'; Mikulička 17'; Mazura 75' | Report | Haider 8' |

Za Lužánkami Stadium, Brno
Attendance: 10,832
Referee: Erik Fredriksson (Sweden)

17 September 1980

| Kaiserslautern (West Germany) | 1–0 | (Belgium) Anderlecht |
|---|---|---|
| Funkel 18' | Report |

Fritz-Walter-Stadion, Kaiserslautern
Attendance: 19,755
Referee: Vojtech Christov (Czechoslovakia)

17 September 1980

| Magdeburg (East Germany) | 2–1 | (Norway) Moss |
|---|---|---|
| Hoffmann 36'; Pommerenke 75' (pen.) | Report | Henæs 84' |

Ernst Grube Stadium, Magdeburg
Attendance: 12,000
Referee: Bogdan Dochev (Bulgaria)

17 September 1980

| AZ Alkmaar (Netherlands) | 6–0 | (Luxembourg) Red Boys Differdange |
|---|---|---|
| Hovenkamp 30'; Nygaard 37'; Peters 44', 47'; Welzl 58'; Tol 84' | Report |

Alkmaarderhout, Alkmaar
Attendance: 4,770
Referee: Roger Verhaeghe (Belgium)

17 September 1980

| Ballymena United (Northern Ireland) | 2–1 | (East Germany) Vorwärts Frankfurt |
|---|---|---|
| McQuiston 55'; Sloan 64' | Report | Geyer 5' |

Ballymena Showgrounds, Ballymena
Attendance: 8,000
Referee: Francis Bastian (Luxembourg)

17 September 1980

| Dynamo Dresden (East Germany) | 1–0 | (Socialist Federal Republic of Yugoslavia) Napredak Kruševac |
|---|---|---|
| Pešterac 67' (o.g.) | Report |

Rudolf-Harbig-Stadion, Dresden
Attendance: 27,000
Referee: Vasile Tătar (Romania)

17 September 1980

| Argeș Pitești (Romania) | 0–0 | (Netherlands) Utrecht |
|---|---|---|
| | Report |

Stadionul 1 Mai, Pitești
Attendance: 14,000
Referee: Heinz Fahler (Austria)

17 September 1980

| Bohemians Prague (Czechoslovakia) | 3–1 | (Spain) Sporting Gijón |
|---|---|---|
| Bičovský 13', 85'; Levý 78' | Report | Ferrero 72' |

Ďolíček, Prague
Attendance: 7,000
Referee: Ottorino Di Bernardo (France)

17 September 1980
19:00

| Dynamo Kyiv (Soviet Union) | 1–1 | (Bulgaria) Levski Sofia |
|---|---|---|
| Buryak 38' (pen.) | Report | Spasov 26' |

Republican Stadium, Kyiv
Attendance: 27,000
Referee: Dušan Krchňák (Czechoslovakia)

17 September 1980
19:00

| Shakhtar Donetsk (Soviet Union) | 1–0 | (West Germany) Eintracht Frankfurt |
|---|---|---|
| Sokolovsky 24' | Report |

Lokomotyv Stadium, Donetsk
Attendance: 44,000
Referee: George Courtney (England)

17 September 1980

| Sochaux (France) | 2–0 | (Switzerland) Servette |
|---|---|---|
| Jeskowiak 40' (pen.); Ivezić 68' (pen.) | Report |

Stade Auguste Bonal, Montbéliard
Attendance: 5,212
Referee: José Maria Miguel Pérez (Spain)

17 September 1980

| Twente (Netherlands) | 5–1 | (Sweden) IFK Göteborg |
|---|---|---|
| Bos 21'; Carlsson 40' (o.g.); Kila 54', 89'; Jol 74' | Report | Nilsson 58' |

Diekman Stadion, Enschede
Attendance: 10,500
Referee: Paolo Bergamo (Italy)

17 September 1980

| Fenerbahçe (Turkey) | 0–1 | (Bulgaria) Beroe Stara Zagora |
|---|---|---|
| | Report | Peev 39' |

Şükrü Saracoğlu Stadium, Istanbul
Attendance: 25,854
Referee: Anatoli Milchenko (Soviet Union)

17 September 1980

| Porto (Portugal) | 1–0 | (Republic of Ireland) Dundalk |
|---|---|---|
| Sousa 16' | Report |

Estádio das Antas, Porto
Attendance: 40,000
Referee: Emilio Soriano Aladrén (Spain)

17 September 1980

| Grasshopper (Switzerland) | 3–1 | (Denmark) KB |
|---|---|---|
| Meyer 19', 53', 55' | Report | Eigenbrod 67' |

Hardturm, Zürich
Attendance: 4,200
Referee: Adolf Prokop (East Germany)

17 September 1980

| Hamburg (West Germany) | 4–2 | (Socialist Federal Republic of Yugoslavia) Sarajevo |
|---|---|---|
| Kaltz 33'; Hrubesch 43', 45'; Hartwig 89' | Report | Sušić 8', 74' |

Volksparkstadion, Hamburg
Attendance: 18,000
Referee: Clive Thomas (Wales)

17 September 1980

| Elfsborg (Sweden) | 1–2 | (Scotland) St Mirren |
|---|---|---|
| Nilsson 15' | Report | Somner 43'; Abercromby 71' |

Ryavallen, Borås
Attendance: 3,776
Referee: Mauri Laakso (Finland)

17 September 1980

| Ipswich Town (England) | 5–1 | (Greece) Aris |
|---|---|---|
| Wark 12', 16', 30', 77'; Mariner 61' | Report | Pallas 47' |

Portman Road, Ipswich
Attendance: 20,842
Referee: Antonio Garrido (Portugal)

16 September 1980

| ÍA (Iceland) | 0–4 | (West Germany) Köln |
|---|---|---|
| | Report | Kroth 49'; Littbarski 59'; Müller 77'; Strack 79' |

Akranesvöllur, Akranes
Attendance: 3,485
Referee: Jim Haughey (Northern Ireland)

17 September 1980

| Juventus (Italy) | 4–0 | (Greece) Panathinaikos |
|---|---|---|
| Scirea 5'; Verza 18'; Bettega 38'; Cabrini 42' (pen.) | Report |

Stadio Communale, Turin
Attendance: 38,710
Referee: Walter Eschweiler (West Germany)

17 September 1980

| Lokeren (Belgium) | 1–1 | (Soviet Union) Dynamo Moscow |
|---|---|---|
| Verheyen 86' (pen.) | Report | Gazzaev 28' |

Daknamstadion, Lokeren
Attendance: 10,000
Referee: Daniel Lambert (France)

17 September 1980

| KuPS (Finland) | 0–7 | (France) Saint-Étienne |
|---|---|---|
| | Report | Paganelli 34', 64'; Platini 45', 48', 74'; Roussey 79'; Janvion 81' |

Väinölänniemi, Kuopio
Attendance: 5,580
Referee: Reidar P. Bjørnestad (Norway)

17 September 1980

| LASK Linz (Austria) | 1–2 | (Socialist Federal Republic of Yugoslavia) Radnički Niš |
|---|---|---|
| Krieger 55' | Report | Stoiljković 45'; Pantelić 65' |

Linzer Stadion, Linz
Attendance: 8,200
Referee: Marian Srodecki (Poland)

17 September 1980

| Manchester United (England) | 1–1 | (Poland) Widzew Łódź |
|---|---|---|
| McIlroy 4' | Report | Surlit 6' |

Old Trafford, Manchester
Attendance: 38,037
Referee: Klaus Scheurell (East Germany)

17 September 1980

| PSV Eindhoven (Netherlands) | 3–1 | (England) Wolverhampton Wanderers |
|---|---|---|
| Brandts 34'; Van Kraay 67'; Van der Kuijlen 76' | Report | Gray 47' |

Philips Stadion, Eindhoven
Attendance: 14,000
Referee: Siegfried Kirschen (East Germany)

17 September 1980

| Molenbeek (Belgium) | 1–2 | (Italy) Torino |
|---|---|---|
| De Wolf 42' | Report | Mariani 61'; Graziani 68' |

Edmond Machtens Stadium, Brussels
Attendance: 10,500
Referee: Pat Partridge (England)

17 September 1980

| Śląsk Wrocław (Poland) | 0–0 | (Scotland) Dundee United |
|---|---|---|
| | Report |

Stadion Olimpijski, Wrocław
Attendance: 7,000
Referee: Svein-Inge Thime (Norway)

16 September 1980

| Sliema Wanderers (Malta) | 0–2 | (Spain) Barcelona |
|---|---|---|
| | Report | Canito 26'; Landáburu 59' |

Ta' Qali National Stadium, Ta' Qali
Attendance: 9,094
Referee: Riccardo Lattanzi (Italy)

17 September 1980

| Standard Liège (Belgium) | 1–1 | (Romania) Steaua București |
|---|---|---|
| Daerden 26' | Report | Răducanu 89' |

Stade Maurice Dufrasne, Liège
Attendance: 16,011
Referee: Victoriano Sánchez (Spain)

16 September 1980

| Újpest (Hungary) | 1–1 | (Spain) Real Sociedad |
|---|---|---|
| Kardos 53' | Report | Periko Alonso 67' |

Ferenc Szusza Stadium, Budapest
Attendance: 8,500
Referee: Erkan Göksel (Turkey)

17 September 1980

| Vasas (Hungary) | 0–2 | (Portugal) Boavista |
|---|---|---|
| | Report | Eliseu 5'; Júlio 44' |

Fáy utcai Stadion, Budapest
Attendance: 4,000
Referee: Gerd Hennig (West Germany)

17 September 1980

| Stuttgart (West Germany) | 6–0 | (Cyprus) Pezoporikos Larnaca |
|---|---|---|
| Klotz 9', 10', 85'; Kelsch 24'; Allgöwer 39', 47' | Report |

Neckarstadion, Stuttgart
Attendance: 13,500
Referee: Richard Casha (Malta)

=== Second leg ===
1 October 1980

| VOEST Linz (Austria) | 0–2 | (Czechoslovakia) Zbrojovka Brno |
|---|---|---|
| | Report | Janečka 23'; Kroupa 65' |

Linzer Stadion, Linz
Attendance: 9,500
Referee: Jack Baumann (Switzerland)

Zbrojovka Brno won 5–1 on aggregate.

1 October 1980

| Anderlecht (Belgium) | 3–2 | (West Germany) Kaiserslautern |
|---|---|---|
| Nielsen 40', 56', 67' (pen.) | Report | Funkel 20'; Wendt 64' |

Constant Vanden Stock Stadium, Brussels
Attendance: 25,543
Referee: Brian McGinlay (Scotland)

3–3 on aggregate; Kaiserslautern won on away goals.

1 October 1980

| Moss (Norway) | 2–3 | (East Germany) Magdeburg |
|---|---|---|
| Kollshaugen 47', 62' | Report | Streich 20'; Mewes 40'; Windelband 89' |

Melløs Stadion, Moss
Attendance: 5,789
Referee: Patrick Mulhall (Republic of Ireland)

Magdeburg won 5–3 on aggregate.

30 September 1980

| Red Boys Differdange (Luxembourg) | 0–4 | (Netherlands) AZ Alkmaar |
|---|---|---|
| | Report | Kist 15', 40' (pen.), 46'; Welzl 55' |

Stade du Thillenberg, Differdange
Attendance: 1,100
Referee: Marcel Bacou (France)

AZ Alkmaar won 10–0 on aggregate.

1 October 1980

| Vorwärts Frankfurt (East Germany) | 3–0 | (Northern Ireland) Ballymena United |
|---|---|---|
| Conrad 3'; Jarmuszkiewicz 11'; Krautzig 58' | Report |

Stadion der Freundschaft, Frankfurt (Oder)
Attendance: 15,000
Referee: László Kőrös (Hungary)

Vorwärts Frankfurt won 4–2 on aggregate.

1 October 1980

| Napredak Kruševac (Socialist Federal Republic of Yugoslavia) | 0–1 | (East Germany) Dynamo Dresden |
|---|---|---|
| | Report | Müller 84' (pen.) |

Mladost Stadium, Kruševac
Attendance: 15,000
Referee: İhsan Türe (Turkey)

Dynamo Dresden won 2–0 on aggregate.

1 October 1980

| Utrecht (Netherlands) | 2–0 | (Romania) Argeș Pitești |
|---|---|---|
| van der Lem 50'; Carbo 85' | Report |

Stadion Galgenwaard, Utrecht
Attendance: 17,000
Referee: John Carpenter (Republic of Ireland)

Utrecht won 2–0 on aggregate.

1 October 1980

| Sporting Gijón (Spain) | 2–1 | (Czechoslovakia) Bohemians Prague |
|---|---|---|
| Ferrero 18'; Jiménez 57' | Report | Němec 10' |

El Molinón, Gijón
Attendance: 18,649
Referee: Ronald Bridges (Wales)

FC Bohemians Praha won 4–3 on aggregate.

1 October 1980

| Levski Sofia (Bulgaria) | 0–0 | (Soviet Union) Dynamo Kyiv |
|---|---|---|
| | Report |

Vasil Levski National Stadium, Sofia
Attendance: 35,000
Referee: László Pádár (Hungary)

1–1 on aggregate; Levski Sofia won on away goals.

1 October 1980

| Eintracht Frankfurt (West Germany) | 3–0 | (Soviet Union) Shakhtar Donetsk |
|---|---|---|
| Hölzenbein 4'; Cha 41', 77' | Report |

Waldstadion, Frankfurt
Attendance: 21,853
Referee: José Luis García Carrión (Spain)

Eintracht Frankfurt won 3–1 on aggregate.

1 October 1980

| Servette (Switzerland) | 2–1 | (France) Sochaux |
|---|---|---|
| Cucinotta 53'; Bizzini 75' | Report | Genghini 16' |

Charmilles Stadium, Geneva
Attendance: 12,160
Referee: David Richardson (England)

Sochaux won 3–2 on aggregate.

1 October 1980

| IFK Göteborg (Sweden) | 2–0 | (Netherlands) Twente |
|---|---|---|
| Holmgren 1'; Nilsson 68' (pen.) | Report |

Ullevi, Gothenburg
Attendance: 3,779
Referee: Valeri Butenko (Soviet Union)

Twente won 5–3 on aggregate.

1 October 1980

| Beroe Stara Zagora (Bulgaria) | 2–1 | (Turkey) Fenerbahçe |
|---|---|---|
| Petkov 19'; Dragolov 89' | Report | Çetiner 89' |

Beroe Stadium, Stara Zagora
Attendance: 25,000
Referee: Heinz Aldinger (West Germany)

Beroe Stara Zagora won 3–1 on aggregate.

1 October 1980

| Dundalk (Republic of Ireland) | 0–0 | (Portugal) Porto |
|---|---|---|
| | Report |

Oriel Park, Dundalk
Attendance: 4,200
Referee: Roger Verhaeghe (Belgium)

Porto won 1–0 on aggregate.

1 October 1980

| KB (Denmark) | 2–5 | (Switzerland) Grasshopper |
|---|---|---|
| Fosgaard 29'; Tune-Hansen 86' | Report | Hermann 51', 60', 75'; Zanetti 57'; Sulser 77' |

Frederiksberg Idrætspark, Frederiksberg
Attendance: 4,800
Referee: Martti Hirviniemi (Finland)

Grasshopper won 8–3 on aggregate.

1 October 1980

| Sarajevo (Socialist Federal Republic of Yugoslavia) | 3–3 | (West Germany) Hamburg |
|---|---|---|
| Lukić 23'; Pašić 36', 80' | Report | Hrubesch 26', 58', 88' |

Asim Ferhatović Hase Stadium, Sarajevo
Attendance: 45,000
Referee: Paolo Casarin (Italy)

Hamburg won 7–5 on aggregate.

1 October 1980

| St Mirren (Scotland) | 0–0 | (Sweden) Elfsborg |
|---|---|---|
| | Report |

St Mirren Park, Paisley
Attendance: 8,326
Referee: Gudmundur Haraldsson (Iceland)

St Mirren won 2–1 on aggregate.

1 October 1980

| Aris (Greece) | 3–1 | (England) Ipswich Town |
|---|---|---|
| Tsirimokos 4'; Drambis 22'; Zelidis 65' | Report | Gates 75' |

Kaftanzoglio Stadium, Thessaloniki
Attendance: 23,306
Referee: Alojzy Jarguz (Poland)

Ipswich Town won 6–4 on aggregate.

1 October 1980

| Köln (West Germany) | 6–0 | (Iceland) ÍA |
|---|---|---|
| Engels 25'; Müller 31', 73', 83', 86'; Okudera 88' | Report |

Müngersdorfer Stadion, Cologne
Attendance: 2,500
Referee: Torben Maansson (Denmark)

Köln won 10–0 on aggregate.

1 October 1980

| Panathinaikos (Greece) | 4–2 | (Italy) Juventus |
|---|---|---|
| Gentile 31' (o.g.); Andreuchi 37'; Livathinos 68'; Delikaris 87' | Report | Bettega 40'; Fanna 81' |

Leoforos Alexandras Stadium, Athens
Attendance: 18,112
Referee: Charles Corver (Netherlands)

Juventus won 6–4 on aggregate.

1 October 1980

| Dynamo Moscow (Soviet Union) | 0–1 | (Belgium) Lokeren |
|---|---|---|
| | Report | Verheyen 89' |

Dynamo Stadium, Moscow
Attendance: 7,500
Referee: Jan Redelfs (West Germany)

Lokeren won 2–1 on aggregate.

1 October 1980

| Saint-Étienne (France) | 7–0 | (Finland) KuPS |
|---|---|---|
| Rep 21', 43', 71', 84' (pen.); Lestage 31'; Paganelli 74'; Lopez 80' | Report |

Stade Geoffroy-Guichard, Saint-Étienne
Attendance: 10,054
Referee: Richard Stagno Navarra (Malta)

Saint-Étienne won 14–0 on aggregate.

1 October 1980

| Radnički Niš (Socialist Federal Republic of Yugoslavia) | 4–1 | (Austria) LASK Linz |
|---|---|---|
| Mitošević 8'; Stoiljković 25', 86'; Panajotović 29' | Report | Sigl 58' |

Čair Stadium, Niš
Attendance: 15,000
Referee: Vasilis Vourakis (Greece)

Radnički Niš won 6–2 on aggregate.

1 October 1980

| Widzew Łódź (Poland) | 0–0 | (England) Manchester United |
|---|---|---|
| | Report |

Stadion Miejski, Łódź
Attendance: 16,000
Referee: Anders Mattsson (Finland)

1–1 on aggregate; Widzew Łódź won on away goals.

1 October 1980

| Wolverhampton Wanderers (England) | 1–0 | (Netherlands) PSV Eindhoven |
|---|---|---|
| Eves 50' | Report |

Molineux Stadium, Wolverhampton
Attendance: 20,176
Referee: Franz Wöhrer (Austria)

PSV Eindhoven won 3–2 on aggregate.

1 October 1980

| Torino (Italy) | 2 – 2 (a.e.t.) | (Belgium) Molenbeek |
|---|---|---|
| D'Amico 2'; Graziani 91' | Report | De Bolle 69'; Van de Korput 80' (o.g.) |

Stadio Communale, Turin
Attendance: 34,148
Referee: Erich Linemayr (Austria)

Torino won 4–3 on aggregate.

1 October 1980

| Dundee United (Scotland) | 7–2 | (Poland) Śląsk Wrocław |
|---|---|---|
| Dodds 6', 75'; Stark 26'; Hegarty 47'; Pettigrew 62', 73'; Payne 82' (pen.) | Report | Pawłowski 38', 88' |

Tannadice Park, Dundee
Attendance: 8,415
Referee: Kjell Johansson (Sweden)

Dundee United won 7–2 on aggregate.

1 October 1980

| Barcelona (Spain) | 1–0 | (Malta) Sliema Wanderers |
|---|---|---|
| Rexach 28' (pen.) | Report |

Camp Nou, Barcelona
Attendance: 25,000
Referee: Viriato Graça Oliva (Portugal)

Barcelona won 3–0 on aggregate.

1 October 1980

| Steaua București (Romania) | 1–2 | (Belgium) Standard Liège |
|---|---|---|
| Răducanu 37' | Report | Voordeckers 51'; Edström 81' |

Stadionul Steaua, Bucharest
Attendance: 15,000
Referee: Bruno Galler (Switzerland)

Standard Liège won 3–2 on aggregate.

1 October 1980

| Real Sociedad (Spain) | 1–0 | (Hungary) Újpest |
|---|---|---|
| Satrústegui 89' | Report |

San Mamés Stadium, Bilbao
Attendance: 25,421
Referee: Roger Schoeters (Belgium)

Real Sociedad won 2–1 on aggregate.

1 October 1980

| Boavista (Portugal) | 0–1 | (Hungary) Vasas |
|---|---|---|
| | Report | Kiss 26' |

Estádio do Bessa, Porto
Attendance: 13,000
Referee: Henk Weerink (Netherlands)

Boavista won 2–1 on aggregate.

24 September 1980

| Pezoporikos Larnaca (Cyprus) | 1–4 | (West Germany) Stuttgart |
|---|---|---|
| Theofanous 70' | Report | Tüfekçi 13'; Klotz 16'; Allgöwer 36'; Ohlicher 76' |

GSZ Stadium, Larnaca
Attendance: 4,000
Referee: Damir Matovinović (Yugoslavia)

Stuttgart won 10–1 on aggregate.

== Second round ==
| Team 1 | Agg. | Team 2 | 1st leg | 2nd leg |
|---|---|---|---|---|
| Zbrojovka Brno (Czechoslovakia) | 2–3 | (Spain) Real Sociedad | 1–1 | 1–2 |
| Kaiserslautern (West Germany) | 2–4 | (Belgium) Standard Liège | 1–2 | 1–2 |
| Köln (West Germany) | 4–1 | (Spain) Barcelona | 0–1 | 4–0 |
| Dundee United (Scotland) | 1–1 (a) | (Belgium) Lokeren | 1–1 | 0–0 |
| Utrecht (Netherlands) | 3–4 | (West Germany) Eintracht Frankfurt | 2–1 | 1–3 |
| Sochaux (France) | 3–2 | (Portugal) Boavista | 2–2 | 1–0 |
| Twente (Netherlands) | 1–1 (a) | (East Germany) Dynamo Dresden | 1–1 | 0–0 |
| Porto (Portugal) | 2–3 | (Switzerland) Grasshopper | 2–0 | 0–3 (a.e.t.) |
| Ipswich Town (England) | 3–2 | (Czechoslovakia) Bohemians Prague | 3–0 | 0–2 |
| Beroe Stara Zagora (Bulgaria) | 1–3 | (Socialist Federal Republic of Yugoslavia) Radnički Niš | 0–1 | 1–2 |
| Levski Sofia (Bulgaria) | 1–6 | (Netherlands) AZ Alkmaar | 1–1 | 0–5 |
| PSV Eindhoven (Netherlands) | 2–3 | (West Germany) Hamburg | 1–1 | 1–2 |
| St Mirren (Scotland) | 0–2 | (France) Saint-Étienne | 0–0 | 0–2 |
| Torino (Italy) | 3–2 | (East Germany) Magdeburg | 3–1 | 0–1 |
| Stuttgart (West Germany) | 7–2 | (East Germany) Vorwärts Frankfurt | 5–1 | 2–1 |
| Widzew Łódź (Poland) | 4–4 (4–1 p) | (Italy) Juventus | 3–1 | 1–3 (a.e.t.) |

=== First leg ===
22 October 1980

| Zbrojovka Brno (Czechoslovakia) | 1–1 | (Spain) Real Sociedad |
|---|---|---|
| Murillo 59' (o.g.) | Report | Uralde 67' |

Za Lužánkami Stadium, Brno
Attendance: 11,520
Referee: Alain Delmer (France)

22 October 1980

| Kaiserslautern (West Germany) | 1–2 | (Belgium) Standard Liège |
|---|---|---|
| Wendt 32' | Report | Wellens 44'; Plessers 65' |

Fritz-Walter-Stadion, Kaiserslautern
Attendance: 21,000
Referee: George Courtney (England)

22 October 1980

| Köln (West Germany) | 0–1 | (Spain) Barcelona |
|---|---|---|
| | Report | Quini 44' |

Müngersdorfer Stadion, Cologne
Attendance: 31,000
Referee: Charles Corver (Netherlands)

22 October 1980

| Dundee United (Scotland) | 1–1 | (Belgium) Lokeren |
|---|---|---|
| Pettigrew 72' | Report | Mommens 59' |

Tannadice Park, Dundee
Attendance: 7,663
Referee: Martti Hirviniemi (Finland)

22 October 1980

| Utrecht (Netherlands) | 2–1 | (West Germany) Eintracht Frankfurt |
|---|---|---|
| Carbo 60' de Kruijk 89' | Report | Borchers 31' |

Stadion Galgenwaard, Utrecht
Attendance: 22,000
Referee: Bruno Galler (Switzerland)

22 October 1980

| Sochaux (France) | 2–2 | (Portugal) Boavista |
|---|---|---|
| Genghini 33'; Revelli 55' | Report | Júlio 28'; Eliseu 58' |

Stade Auguste Bonal, Montbéliard
Attendance: 9,689
Referee: Stjepan Glavina (Yugoslavia)

22 October 1980

| Twente (Netherlands) | 1–1 | (East Germany) Dynamo Dresden |
|---|---|---|
| Rohde 41' | Report | Heidler 49' |

Diekman Stadion, Enschede
Attendance: 14,000
Referee: Augusto Lamo Castillo (Spain)

22 October 1980

| Porto (Portugal) | 2–0 | (Switzerland) Grasshopper |
|---|---|---|
| Teixeira 36'; Sousa 54' | Report |

Estádio das Antas, Porto
Attendance: 35,000
Referee: Egbert Mulder (Netherlands)

22 October 1980

| Ipswich Town (England) | 3–0 | (Czechoslovakia) Bohemians Prague |
|---|---|---|
| Wark 48', 54'; Beattie 85' | Report |

Portman Road, Ipswich
Attendance: 17,163
Referee: Ole Amundsen (Denmark)

22 October 1980

| Beroe Stara Zagora (Bulgaria) | 0–1 | (Socialist Federal Republic of Yugoslavia) Radnički Niš |
|---|---|---|
| | Report | Halilović 78' |

Beroe Stadium, Stara Zagora
Attendance: 10,000
Referee: Sándor Kuti (Hungary)

21 October 1980
17:00

| Levski Sofia (Bulgaria) | 1–1 | (Netherlands) AZ Alkmaar |
|---|---|---|
| Spasov 54' (pen.) | Report | Kist 47' |

Vasil Levski National Stadium, Sofia
Attendance: 8,000
Referee: Walter Eschweiler (West Germany)

22 October 1980

| PSV Eindhoven (Netherlands) | 1–1 | (West Germany) Hamburg |
|---|---|---|
| Van der Kuijlen 47' | Report | Hrubesch 2' |

Philips Stadion, Eindhoven
Attendance: 27,000
Referee: Károly Palotai (Hungary)

22 October 1980

| St Mirren (Scotland) | 0–0 | (France) Saint-Étienne |
|---|---|---|
| | Report |

Saint Mirren Park, Paisley
Attendance: 11,471
Referee: Henning Lund-Sørensen (Denmark)

22 October 1980

| Torino (Italy) | 3–1 | (East Germany) Magdeburg |
|---|---|---|
| Sala 44'; Pecci 54'; D'Amico 74' | Report | Steinbach 65' |

Stadio Communale, Turin
Attendance: 30,000
Referee: Alexis Ponnet (Belgium)

22 October 1980

| Stuttgart (West Germany) | 5–1 | (East Germany) Vorwärts Frankfurt |
|---|---|---|
| Tüfekçi 20'; Martin 42' (pen.); Allgöwer 47', 55'; Klotz 82' | Report | Krautzig 84' |

Neckarstadion, Stuttgart
Attendance: 30,000
Referee: Gianfranco Menegali (Italy)

22 October 1980

| Widzew Łódź (Poland) | 3–1 | (Italy) Juventus |
|---|---|---|
| Grębosz 30'; Pięta 69'; Smolarek 79' | Report | Bettega 42' |

Stadion Miejski, Łódź
Attendance: 35,000
Referee: Horst Brummeier (Austria)

=== Second leg ===
5 November 1980

| Real Sociedad (Spain) | 2–1 | (Czechoslovakia) Zbrojovka Brno |
|---|---|---|
| Satrústegui 3', 8' | Report | Kotásek 83' |

Atotxa Stadium, San Sebastián
Attendance: 20,485
Referee: Bob Valentine (Scotland)

Real Sociedad won 3–2 on aggregate.

5 November 1980

| Standard Liège (Belgium) | 2–1 | (West Germany) Kaiserslautern |
|---|---|---|
| Edström 4'; Graf 83' | Report | Briegel 10' |

Stade Maurice Dufrasne, Liège
Attendance: 30,000
Referee: Ulf Eriksson (Sweden)

Standard Liège won 4–2 on aggregate.

5 November 1980

| Barcelona (Spain) | 0–4 | (West Germany) Köln |
|---|---|---|
| | Report | Strack 41'; Engels 55'; Littbarski 63'; Müller 83' |

Camp Nou, Barcelona
Attendance: 35,000
Referee: Pat Partridge (England)

1. FC Köln won 4–1 on aggregate.

5 November 1980

| Lokeren (Belgium) | 0–0 | (Scotland) Dundee United |
|---|---|---|
| | Report |

Daknamstadion, Lokeren
Attendance: 9,000
Referee: Klaus Scheurell (East Germany)

1–1 on aggregate; Lokeren won on away goals

5 November 1980

| Eintracht Frankfurt (West Germany) | 3–1 | (Netherlands) Utrecht |
|---|---|---|
| Karger 52'; Nachtweih 56'; Pezzey 68' | Report | Neuberger 48' (o.g.) |

Waldstadion, Frankfurt am Main
Attendance: 19,000
Referee: Dušan Krchňák (Czechoslovakia)

Eintracht Frankfurt won 4–3 on aggregate.

5 November 1980

| Boavista (Portugal) | 0–1 | (France) Sochaux |
|---|---|---|
| | Report | Durkalić 74' |

Estádio do Bessa, Porto
Attendance: 12,000
Referee: Ronald Bridges (Wales)

Sochaux won 3–2 on aggregate.

5 November 1980

| Dynamo Dresden (East Germany) | 0–0 | (Netherlands) Twente |
|---|---|---|
| | Report |

Rudolf-Harbig Stadion, Dresden
Attendance: 35,000
Referee: Rolf Ericsson (Sweden)

1–1 on aggregate; Dynamo Dresden won on away goals

5 November 1980

| Grasshopper (Switzerland) | 3–0 (a.e.t.) | (Portugal) Porto |
|---|---|---|
| Sulser 26'; Wehrli 66'; Pfister 118' | Report |

Hardturm, Zürich
Attendance: 8,100
Referee: Bogdan Dochev (Bulgaria)

Grasshoppers won 3–2 on aggregate.

5 November 1980

| Bohemians Prague (Czech Republic) | 2–0 | (England) Ipswich Town |
|---|---|---|
| Mičinec 3'; Panenka 51' | Report |

Ďolíček, Prague
Attendance: 13,000
Referee: Paolo Casarin (Italy)

Ipswich Town won 3–2 on aggregate.

5 November 1980

| Radnički Niš (Socialist Federal Republic of Yugoslavia) | 2–1 | (Bulgaria) Beroe Stara Zagora |
|---|---|---|
| Stoiljković 18'; Mitošević 53' | Report | Stoyanov 87' |

Čair Stadium, Niš
Attendance: 10,000
Referee: Ioan Igna (Romania)

Radnički Niš won 3–1 on aggregate.

4 November 1980

| AZ Alkmaar (Netherlands) | 5–0 | (Bulgaria) Levski Sofia |
|---|---|---|
| Tol 30', 57'; Nygaard 51' (pen.); Kist 61'; Peters 89' | Report |

Alkmaarderhout, Alkmaar
Attendance: 18,000
Referee: Rolf Nyhus (Norway)

AZ Alkmaar won 6–1 on aggregate.

5 November 1980

| Hamburg (West Germany) | 2–1 | (Netherlands) PSV Eindhoven |
|---|---|---|
| Groh 47'; Hrubesch 72' | Report | Van der Kuijlen 63' |

Volksparkstadion, Hamburg
Attendance: 46,000
Referee: Georges Konrath (France)

Hamburg won 3–2 on aggregate.

5 November 1980

| Saint-Étienne (France) | 2–0 | (Scotland) St Mirren |
|---|---|---|
| Larios 14', 57' | Report |

Stade Geoffroy-Guichard, Saint-Étienne
Attendance: 17,870
Referee: Mário da Silva Luís (Portugal)

Saint-Étienne won 2–0 on aggregate.

5 November 1980

| Magdeburg (East Germany) | 1–0 | (Italy) Torino |
|---|---|---|
| Tyll 25' | Report |

Ernst Grube Stadium, Magdeburg
Attendance: 14,500
Referee: Jan Keizer (Netherlands)

Torino won 3–2 on aggregate.

5 November 1980

| Vorwärts Frankfurt (East Germany) | 1–2 | (West Germany) Stuttgart |
|---|---|---|
| Lindemann 85' | Report | Allgöwer 19'; Müller 83' (pen.) |

Stadion der Freundschaft, Frankfurt (Oder)
Attendance: 15,000
Referee: George Smith (Scotland)

Stuttgart won 7–2 on aggregate.

5 November 1980

| Juventus (Italy) | 3 – 1 (a.e.t.) | (Poland) Widzew Łódź |
|---|---|---|
| Tardelli 37'; Furino 46'; Brady 60' | Report | Pięta 59' |
Penalties
| Causio (penalty missed); Cabrini (penalty missed); Brady (penalty scored) | 1–4 | (penalty scored) Tłokiński; (penalty scored) Grębosz; (penalty scored) Smolarek; (penalty scored) Boniek |

Stadio Communale, Turin
Attendance: 33,900
Referee: Talat Tokat (Turkey)

4–4 on aggregate; Widzew Łódź won 4–1 on penalties.

== Third round ==
| Team 1 | Agg. | Team 2 | 1st leg | 2nd leg |
|---|---|---|---|---|
| Eintracht Frankfurt (West Germany) | 4–4 (a) | (France) FC Sochaux-Montbeliard | 4–2 | 0–2 |
| Grasshopper (Switzerland) | 3–3 (4–3 p) | (Italy) Torino | 2–1 | 1–2 (a.e.t.) |
| Hamburg (West Germany) | 0–6 | (France) Saint-Étienne | 0–5 | 0–1 |
| Ipswich Town (England) | 5–1 | (Poland) Widzew Łódź | 5–0 | 0–1 |
| Lokeren (Belgium) | 3–2 | (Spain) Real Sociedad | 1–0 | 2–2 |
| Radnički Niš (Socialist Federal Republic of Yugoslavia) | 2–7 | (Netherlands) AZ Alkmaar | 2–2 | 0–5 |
| Standard Liège (Belgium) | 5–2 | (East Germany) Dynamo Dresden | 1–1 | 4–1 |
| Stuttgart (West Germany) | 4–5 | (West Germany) Köln | 3–1 | 1–4 (a.e.t.) |

=== First leg ===
26 November 1980

| Eintracht Frankfurt (West Germany) | 4–2 | (France) Sochaux |
|---|---|---|
| Neuberger 3'; Borchers 8'; Hölzenbein 51'; Nachtweih 61' | Report | Genghini 72'; Pezzey 86' (o.g.) |

Waldstadion, Frankfurt am Main
Attendance: 14,000
Referee: Bogdan Dochev (Bulgaria)

26 November 1980

| Grasshopper (Switzerland) | 2–1 | (Italy) Torino |
|---|---|---|
| Hermann 52'; Koller 53' | Report | Sclosa 49' |

Hardturm, Zürich
Attendance: 25,500
Referee: Vojtech Christov (Czechoslovakia)

26 November 1980

| Hamburg (West Germany) | 0–5 | (France) Saint-Étienne |
|---|---|---|
| | Report | Hartwig 8' (o.g.); Platini 26', 87'; Larios 39'; Zimako 85' |

Volksparkstadion, Hamburg
Attendance: 37,000
Referee: John Hunting (England)

26 November 1980

| Ipswich Town (England) | 5–0 | (Poland) Widzew Łódź |
|---|---|---|
| Wark 21', 44', 77'; Brazil 41'; Mariner 70' | Report |

Portman Road, Ipswich
Attendance: 20,445
Referee: Robert Wurtz (France)

26 November 1980

| Lokeren (Belgium) | 1–0 | (Spain) Real Sociedad |
|---|---|---|
| Lato 48' | Report |

Daknamstadion, Lokeren
Attendance: 9,000
Referee: Josef Bucek (Austria)

26 November 1980
13:00

| Radnički Niš (Socialist Federal Republic of Yugoslavia) | 2–2 | (Netherlands) AZ Alkmaar |
|---|---|---|
| Pantelić 47' (pen.); Panajotović 82' | Report | Tol 32'; Kist 77' |

Čair Stadium, Niš
Attendance: 18,000
Referee: Ruedi Renggli (Switzerland)

26 November 1980

| Standard Liège (Belgium) | 1–1 | (East Germany) Dynamo Dresden |
|---|---|---|
| Plessers 88' | Report | Heidler 36' |

Stade Maurice Dufrasne, Liège
Attendance: 18,000
Referee: Alberto Michelotti (Italy)

26 November 1980

| Stuttgart (West Germany) | 3–1 | (West Germany) Köln |
|---|---|---|
| Müller 22', 35' (pen.); Förster 53' | Report | Konopka 17' |

Neckarstadion, Stuttgart
Attendance: 26,000
Referee: Rolf Ericsson (Sweden)

=== Second leg ===
10 December 1980

| Sochaux (France) | 2–0 | (West Germany) Eintracht Frankfurt |
|---|---|---|
| Revelli 17', 43' | Report |

Stade Auguste Bonal, Montbéliard
Attendance: 8,500
Referee: Marcel Van Langenhove (Belgium)

4–4 on aggregate; Sochaux won on away goals.

10 December 1980

| Torino (Italy) | 2 – 1 (a.e.t.) | (Switzerland) Grasshopper |
|---|---|---|
| Graziani 62'; Pulici 63' | Report | Terraneo 28' (o.g.) |
Penalties
| D'Amico (penalty scored); Sclosa (penalty scored); Graziani (penalty scored); Zaccarelli (penalty missed); Pecci (penalty missed) | 3–4 | (penalty scored) Heinz Hermann; (penalty scored) Egli; (penalty scored) Sulser; (penalty scored) Hächler |

Stadio Communale, Turin
Attendance: 32,065
Referee: Károly Palotai (Hungary)

3–3 on aggregate; Grasshoppers won 4–3 on penalties.

10 December 1980

| Saint-Étienne (France) | 1–0 | (West Germany) Hamburg |
|---|---|---|
| Paganelli 10' | Report |

Stade Geoffroy-Guichard, Saint-Étienne
Attendance: 36,998
Referee: Emilio Guruceta Muro (Spain)

Saint-Étienne won 6–0 on aggregate.

10 December 1980

| Widzew Łódź (Poland) | 1–0 | (England) Ipswich Town |
|---|---|---|
| Pięta 56' | Report |

Stadion Miejski, Łódź
Attendance: 12,000
Referee: Jan Redelfs (West Germany)

Ipswich Town won 5–1 on aggregate.

10 December 1980

| Real Sociedad (Spain) | 2–2 | (Belgium) Lokeren |
|---|---|---|
| López Ufarte 82' (pen.); Zamora 86' | Report | Elkjær 20', 48' |

Atotxa Stadium, San Sebastián
Attendance: 23,000
Referee: Clive Thomas (Wales)

Lokeren won 3–2 on aggregate.

10 December 1980
20:15

| AZ Alkmaar (Netherlands) | 5–0 | (Socialist Federal Republic of Yugoslavia) Radnički Niš |
|---|---|---|
| Kist 20', 25', 65'; Nygaard 42'; Welzl 60' | Report |

Alkmaarderhout, Alkmaar
Attendance: 10,304
Referee: Adolf Prokop (East Germany)

AZ won 7–2 on aggregate.

10 December 1980

| Dynamo Dresden (East Germany) | 1–4 | (Belgium) Standard Liège |
|---|---|---|
| Döschner 80' | Report | Sigurvinsson 17', 40', 55'; Tahamata 76' |

Rudolf-Harbig Stadium, Dresden
Attendance: 35,000
Referee: Charles Corver (Netherlands)

Standard Liège won 5–2 on aggregate.

10 December 1980

| Köln (West Germany) | 4–1 (a.e.t.) | (West Germany) Stuttgart |
|---|---|---|
| Müller 24'; Strack 85'; Woodcock 62', 106' | Report | Konopka 84' (o.g.) |

Müngersdorfer Stadion, Cologne
Attendance: 26,500
Referee: Valeri Butenko (Soviet Union)

Köln won 5–4 on aggregate.

== Quarter-finals ==
| Team 1 | Agg. | Team 2 | 1st leg | 2nd leg |
|---|---|---|---|---|
| Saint-Étienne (France) | 2–7 | (England) Ipswich Town | 1–4 | 1–3 |
| AZ Alkmaar (Netherlands) | 2–1 | (Belgium) Lokeren | 2–0 | 0–1 |
| Grasshopper (Switzerland) | 1–2 | (France) Sochaux | 0–0 | 1–2 |
| Standard Liège (Belgium) | 2–3 | (Germany) Köln | 0–0 | 2–3 |

=== First leg ===
4 March 1981

| Saint-Étienne (France) | 1–4 | (England) Ipswich Town |
|---|---|---|
| Rep 16' | Report | Mariner 28', 57'; Mühren 47'; Wark 76' |

Stade Geoffroy-Guichard, Saint-Étienne
Attendance: 36,919
Referee: Nicolae Rainea (Romania)

4 March 1981
20:15

| AZ Alkmaar (Netherlands) | 2–0 | (Belgium) Lokeren |
|---|---|---|
| Tol 9'; Welzl 18' | Report |

Alkmaarderhout, Alkmaar
Attendance: 13,400
Referee: Augusto Lamo Castillo (Spain)

4 March 1981

| Grasshopper (Switzerland) | 0–0 | (France) Sochaux |
|---|---|---|
| | Report |

Hardturm, Zürich
Attendance: 17,000
Referee: Eldar Azimzade (Soviet Union)

4 March 1981

| Standard Liège (Belgium) | 0–0 | (West Germany) Köln |
|---|---|---|
| | Report |

Stade Maurice Dufrasne, Liège
Attendance: 22,500
Referee: Vojtech Christov (Czechoslovakia)

=== Second leg ===
18 March 1981
19:30

| Ipswich Town (England) | 3–1 | (France) Saint-Étienne |
|---|---|---|
| Butcher 46'; Wark 83' (pen.); Mariner 89' | Report | Zimako 80' |

Portman Road, Ipswich
Attendance: 30,141
Referee: Erich Linemayr (Austria)

Ipswich Town won 7–2 on aggregate.

18 March 1981
20:00

| Lokeren (Belgium) | 1–0 | (Netherlands) AZ Alkmaar |
|---|---|---|
| Verheyen 36' | Report |

Daknamstadion, Lokeren
Attendance: 12,000
Referee: Clive White (England)

AZ Alkmaar won 2–1 on aggregate.

18 March 1981

| Sochaux (France) | 2–1 | (Switzerland) Grasshopper |
|---|---|---|
| Durkalić 24'; Genghini 84' | Report | Koller 10' |

Stade Auguste Bonal, Montbéliard
Attendance: 13,453
Referee: Jan Redelfs (West Germany)

Sochaux won 2–1 on aggregate.

18 March 1981

| Köln (West Germany) | 3–2 | (Belgium) Standard Liège |
|---|---|---|
| Müller 29'; Bonhof 70' (pen.); Littbarski 86' | Report | Graf 41'; Vandersmissen 66' |

Müngersdorfer Stadion, Cologne
Attendance: 56,000
Referee: John Carpenter (Republic of Ireland)

Köln won 3–2 on aggregate.

== Semi-finals ==
| Team 1 | Agg. | Team 2 | 1st leg | 2nd leg |
|---|---|---|---|---|
| Sochaux (France) | 3–4 | (Netherlands) AZ Alkmaar | 1–1 | 2–3 |
| Ipswich Town (England) | 2–0 | (Germany) Köln | 1–0 | 1–0 |

=== First leg ===
8 April 1981
20:30

| FC Sochaux (France) | 1–1 | (Netherlands) AZ Alkmaar |
|---|---|---|
| Genghini 22' | Report | Arntz 14' |

Stade Auguste Bonal, Montbéliard
Attendance: 16,000

8 April 1981
19:30

| Ipswich Town (England) | 1–0 | (Germany) Köln |
|---|---|---|
| Wark 33' | Report |

Portman Road, Ipswich
Attendance: 24,780

=== Second leg ===
22 April 1981
20:30

| AZ Alkmaar (Netherlands) | 3–2 | (France) FC Sochaux |
|---|---|---|
| Metgod 19'; Jonker 37'; Peters 63' | Report | Genghini 9'; Meyer 73' |

Alkmaarderhout, Alkmaar
Attendance: 9,085
Referee: Nicolae Rainea (Romania)

AZ Alkmaar won 4–3 on aggregate.

22 April 1981
20:00

| Köln (Germany) | 0–1 | (England) Ipswich Town |
|---|---|---|
| | Report | Butcher 64' |

Müngersdorfer Stadion, Cologne
Attendance: 49,476

Ipswich Town won 2–0 on aggregate.

== Final ==
=== First leg ===
6 May 1981
19:30

| Ipswich Town (England) | 3–0 | (Netherlands) AZ Alkmaar |
|---|---|---|
| Wark 30' (pen.); Thijssen 47'; Mariner 55' | Report |

Portman Road, Ipswich
Attendance: 27,532
Referee: Adolf Prokop (East Germany)

=== Second leg ===
20 May 1981
19:30

| AZ Alkmaar (Netherlands) | 4–2 | (England) Ipswich Town |
|---|---|---|
| Welzl 7'; Metgod 25'; Tol 40'; Jonker 73' | Report | Thijssen 4'; Wark 32' |

Olympic Stadium, Amsterdam
Attendance: 22,291
Referee: Walter Eschweiler (West Germany)

Ipswich Town won 5–4 on aggregate.

== See also ==
- 1980–81 European Cup
- 1980–81 European Cup Winners' Cup
