= 1980–81 AS Saint-Étienne season =

Saint-Étienne
1980–81 season
- President: Roger Rocher
- Head coach: Robert Herbin
- Division 1: 1st
- Coupe de France: Runners-up
- UEFA Cup: Quarter-finals
- Top goalscorer: League: Michel Platini (20); All: Michel Platini (30)
Home colours	Away colours

The 1980–81 season was the 62nd season in the history of AS Saint-Étienne and the club's 18th consecutive season in the top flight of French football. In addition to the domestic league, Saint-Étienne took part in this season's editions of the Coupe de France and UEFA Cup.

== Pre-season and friendlies ==
Win Draw Loss

7 July 1980 Friendly	Saint-Étienne (France)	4–2	(Czechoslovakia) FC Zbrojovka Brno
CEST (UTC+2)

9 August 1980 Friendly	Internazionale (Italy)	2–0	(France) Saint-Étienne
CEST (UTC+2)

4 June 1981 Friendly	Barcelona (Spain)	1–0	(France) Saint-Étienne
CEST (UTC+2)

== Competitions ==
=== Overall record ===
Competition	First match	Last match	Starting round	Final position	Record							
Competition	First match	Last match	Starting round	Final position	Pld	W	D	L	GF	GA	GD	Win %
Division 1	24 July 1980	2 June 1981	Matchday 1	Winners	38	23	11	4	68	26	+42	60.53
Coupe de France	3 April 1981	13 June 1981	Round of 16	Runners-up	7	3	2	2	11	9	+2	42.86
UEFA Cup	17 September 1980	18 March 1981	First round	Quarter-finals	8	5	1	2	24	7	+17	62.50
Total					53	31	14	8	103	42	+61	58.49

Source: Competitions

=== Division 1 ===
==== League table ====
Pos	Team	Pld	W	D	L	GF	GA	GD	Pts	Qualification or relegation
1	Saint-Étienne (C)	38	23	11	4	68	26	+42	57	Qualification to European Cup first round
2	Nantes	38	22	11	5	74	36	+38	55	Qualification to UEFA Cup first round
3	Bordeaux	38	18	13	7	57	34	+23	49	Qualification to UEFA Cup first round
4	Monaco	38	19	11	8	58	41	+17	49	Qualification to UEFA Cup first round
5	Paris Saint-Germain	38	17	12	9	62	50	+12	46	

Source: Footballdatabase.eu
Rules for classification: 1) points; 2) goal difference; 3) number of goals scored.
Victory: 2 points, Draw: 1 point, Defeat: 0 points
(C) Champions

==== Results summary ====
Overall								Home						Away					
Pld	W	D	L	GF	GA	GD	Pts	W	D	L	GF	GA	GD	W	D	L	GF	GA	GD
38	23	11	4	68	26	+42	80	14	3	2	45	12	+33	9	8	2	23	14	+9

Source: Ligue 1

==== Results by round ====
Round	1	2	3	4	5	6	7	8	9	10	11	12	13	14	15	16	17	18	19	20	21	22	23	24	25	26	27	28	29	30	31	32	33	34	35	36	37	38
Ground	A	H	A	H	A	H	A	H	A	H	A	H	A	A	H	A	H	A	H	A	H	A	H	A	H	A	H	A	H	A	H	H	A	H	A	H	A	H
Result	L	W	L	W	W	W	W	W	D	W	W	W	D	D	W	D	D	W	L	W	W	D	W	D	W	W	W	W	W	D	L	W	W	D	D	D	W	W
Position	19	14	17	10	4	3	2	1	1	1	1	1	1	2	1	1	1	1	2	1	1	2	2	2	2	2	2	2	1	1	1	1	2	1	1	2	1	1

Source: Ligue 1
A = Away; H = Home; W = Win; D = Draw; L = Loss

==== Matches ====
24 July 1980 1	Bordeaux	3–0	Saint-Étienne	Bordeaux
CEST (UTC+2)

29 July 1980 2	Saint-Étienne	3–2	Nice	Saint-Étienne
CEST (UTC+2)				Stadium: Stade Geoffroy-Guichard

5 August 1980 3	Bastia	2–1	Saint-Étienne	Bastia
CEST (UTC+2)

12 August 1980 4	Saint-Étienne	4–1	Nancy	Saint-Étienne
CEST (UTC+2)				Stadium: Stade Geoffroy-Guichard

19 August 1980 5	Strasbourg	0–2	Saint-Étienne	Strasbourg
CEST (UTC+2)

22 August 1980 6	Saint-Étienne	5–0	Angers	Saint-Étienne
CEST (UTC+2)				Stadium: Stade Geoffroy-Guichard

26 August 1980 7	Auxerre	0–2	Saint-Étienne	Auxerre
CEST (UTC+2)

29 August 1980 8	Saint-Étienne	3–1	Lille	Saint-Étienne
CEST (UTC+2)				Stadium: Stade Geoffroy-Guichard

9 September 1980 9	Lyon	1–1	Saint-Étienne	Lyon
CEST (UTC+2)

12 September 1980 10	Saint-Étienne	4–0	Valenciennes	Saint-Étienne
CEST (UTC+2)				Stadium: Stade Geoffroy-Guichard

23 September 1980 11	Monaco	1–2	Saint-Étienne	Monaco
CEST (UTC+2)

26 September 1980 12	Saint-Étienne	3–0	Metz	Saint-Étienne
CEST (UTC+2)				Stadium: Stade Geoffroy-Guichard

4 October 1980 13	Paris Saint-Germain	1–1	Saint-Étienne	Paris
CEST (UTC+2)

14 October 1980 14	Laval	0–0	Saint-Étienne	Laval
CEST (UTC+2)

17 October 1980 15	Saint-Étienne	3–0	Sochaux	Saint-Étienne
CEST (UTC+2)				Stadium: Stade Geoffroy-Guichard

31 October 1980 16	Lens	1–1	Saint-Étienne	Lens
CEST (UTC+2)

8 November 1980 17	Saint-Étienne	0–0	Nantes	Saint-Étienne
CEST (UTC+2)				Stadium: Stade Geoffroy-Guichard

12 November 1980 18	Nîmes	0–1	Saint-Étienne	Nîmes
CEST (UTC+2)

23 November 1980 19	Saint-Étienne	1–2	Tours	Saint-Étienne
CEST (UTC+2)				Stadium: Stade Geoffroy-Guichard

29 November 1980 20	Nice	0–1	Saint-Étienne	Nice
CEST (UTC+2)

5 December 1980 21	Saint-Étienne	3–0	Bastia	Saint-Étienne
CEST (UTC+2)				Stadium: Stade Geoffroy-Guichard

13 December 1980 22	Nancy	0–0	Saint-Étienne	Tomblaine
CEST (UTC+2)

21 December 1980 23	Saint-Étienne	3–0	Strasbourg	Saint-Étienne
CEST (UTC+2)				Stadium: Stade Geoffroy-Guichard

25 January 1981 24	Angers	1–1	Saint-Étienne	Angers
CEST (UTC+2)

1 February 1981 25	Saint-Étienne	2–0	Auxerre	Saint-Étienne
CEST (UTC+2)				Stadium: Stade Geoffroy-Guichard

6 February 1981 26	Lille	1–3	Saint-Étienne	Lille
CEST (UTC+2)

22 February 1981 27	Saint-Étienne	3–2	Lyon	Saint-Étienne
CEST (UTC+2)				Stadium: Stade Geoffroy-Guichard

28 February 1981 28	Valenciennes	0–1	Saint-Étienne	Valenciennes
CEST (UTC+2)

14 March 1981 29	Saint-Étienne	5–1	Monaco	Saint-Étienne
CEST (UTC+2)				Stadium: Stade Geoffroy-Guichard

28 March 1981 30	Metz	1–1	Saint-Étienne	Metz
CEST (UTC+2)

7 April 1981 31	Saint-Étienne	0–2	Paris Saint-Germain	Saint-Étienne
CEST (UTC+2)				Stadium: Stade Geoffroy-Guichard

15 April 1981 32	Saint-Étienne	1–0	Laval	Saint-Étienne
CEST (UTC+2)				Stadium: Stade Geoffroy-Guichard

5 May 1981 34	Saint-Étienne	0–0	Lens	Saint-Étienne
CEST (UTC+2)				Stadium: Stade Geoffroy-Guichard

12 May 1981 35	Nantes	1–1	Saint-Étienne	Nantes
CEST (UTC+2)

22 May 1981 36	Saint-Étienne	0–0	Nîmes	Saint-Étienne
CEST (UTC+2)				Stadium: Stade Geoffroy-Guichard

26 May 1981 33	Sochaux	1–2	Saint-Étienne
CEST (UTC+2)

29 May 1981 37	Tours	1–3	Saint-Étienne	Tours
CEST (UTC+2)

2 June 1981 38	Saint-Étienne	2–1	Bordeaux	Saint-Étienne
CEST (UTC+2)				Stadium: Stade Geoffroy-Guichard

=== Coupe de France ===
==== Round of 16 ====
3 April 1981 First leg	Nancy	2–1	Saint-Étienne	Tomblaine
CEST (UTC+2)

11 April 1981 Second leg	Saint-Étienne	3–1 (4–3 agg.)	Nancy	Saint-Étienne
CEST (UTC+2)				Stadium: Stade Geoffroy-Guichard

==== Quarter-finals ====
8 May 1981 First leg	Saint-Étienne	2–1	Montpellier	Saint-Étienne
CEST (UTC+2)				Stadium: Stade Geoffroy-Guichard

19 May 1981 Second leg	Montpellier	1–1 (2–3 agg.)	Saint-Étienne	Montpellier
CEST (UTC+2)

==== Semi-finals ====
5 June 1981 First leg	Saint-Étienne	2–1	Strasbourg	Saint-Étienne
CEST (UTC+2)				Stadium: Stade Geoffroy-Guichard

9 June 1981 Second leg	Strasbourg	1–1 (2–3 agg.)	Saint-Étienne	Strasbourg
CEST (UTC+2)

==== Final ====
13 June 1981 Final	Bastia	2–1	Saint-Étienne	Paris
CEST (UTC+2)				Stadium: Parc des Princes; Attendance: 46,155; Referee: Georges Konrath

=== UEFA Cup ===
==== First round ====
17 September 1980 First leg	KuPS (Finland)	0–7	(France) Saint-Étienne	Kuopio
EEST (UTC+3)			Paganelli 34', 64'; Platini 45', 48', 74'; Roussey 79'; Janvion 81'	Stadium: Väinölänniemi; Referee: Reidar P. Bjørnestad (Norway)

1 October 1980 Second leg	Saint-Étienne (France)	7–0 (14–0 agg.)	(Finland) KuPS	Saint-Étienne
CEST (UTC+2)	Rep 21', 43', 71', 84' (pen.); Lestage 31'; Paganelli 74'; Lopez 80'			Stadium: Stade Geoffroy-Guichard; Referee: Richard Stagno Navarra (Malta)

==== Second round ====
22 October 1980 First leg	St Mirren (Scotland)	0–0	(France) Saint-Étienne	Paisley
BST (UTC+1)				Stadium: Saint Mirren Park; Referee: Henning Lund-Sørensen (Denmark)

5 November 1980 Second leg	Saint-Étienne (France)	2–0 (2–0 agg.)	(Scotland) St Mirren	Saint-Étienne
CET (UTC+1)	Larios 14', 57'			Stadium: Stade Geoffroy-Guichard; Referee: Mário da Silva Luís (Portugal)

==== Third round ====
26 November 1980 First leg	Hamburg (West Germany)	0–5	(France) Saint-Étienne	Hamburg
CET (UTC+1)			Hartwig 8' (o.g.); Platini 26', 87'; Larios 39'; Zimako 85'	Stadium: Volksparkstadion; Referee: John Hunting (England)

10 December 1980 Second leg	Saint-Étienne (France)	1–0 (6–0 agg.)	(West Germany) Hamburg	Saint-Étienne
CET (UTC+1)	Paganelli 10'			Stadium: Stade Geoffroy-Guichard; Referee: Emilio Guruceta Muro (Spain)

==== Quarter-finals ====
4 March 1981 First leg	Saint-Étienne (France)	1–4	(England) Ipswich Town	Saint-Étienne
CET (UTC+1)	Rep 16'		Mariner 28', 57'; Mühren 47'; Wark 76'	Stadium: Stade Geoffroy-Guichard; Attendance: 42,000; Referee: Nicolae Rainea (Romania)

18 March 1981 Second leg	Ipswich Town (England)	3–1 (7–2 agg.)	(France) Saint-Étienne	Ipswich
19:30 BST (UTC+1)	Butcher 46'; Wark 83' (pen.); Mariner 89'		Zimako 80'	Stadium: Portman Road; Attendance: 30,141; Referee: Erich Linemayr
