= Stadion der Freundschaft =

Stadion der Freundschaft may refer to:

- Stadion der Freundschaft (Cottbus)
- Stadion der Freundschaft (Frankfurt (Oder))
- Stadion der Freundschaft (Gera)
