= 1980–81 Irish Cup =

Tournament details
- Country: Northern Ireland
- Teams: 16

Final positions
- Champions: Ballymena United (3rd win)
- Runners-up: Glenavon

Tournament statistics
- Matches played: 19
- Goals scored: 52 (2.74 per match)

The 1980–81 Irish Cup was the 101st edition of the Irish Cup, Northern Ireland's premier football knock-out cup competition. It began on 31 January 1981, and concluded on 2 May 1981 with the final.

The defending champions were Linfield who won the cup for the 32nd time the previous season, defeating Crusaders 2–0 in the 1979–80 final. They reached the semi-finals this time, where they were defeated 1–0 by Glenavon. Ballymena United won the cup for the third time (fourth time if you include Ballymena's record), defeating Glenavon 1–0 in the final.

== Results ==
=== First round ===
Team 1	Score	Team 2
Ards	3–0	Ballyclare Comrades
Bangor	1–2	Newry Town
Chimney Corner	1–2^{1}	Cliftonville
Coleraine	1–2	Ballymena United
Crusaders	1–3	Glentoran
Glenavon	3–2	Distillery
Larne	0–1^{2}	Carrick Rangers
Linfield	3–0^{1}	Portadown

^{1}These ties required a replay, after the first games ended as 0–0 draws.
^{2}This tie required a replay, after the first game ended as 1–1 draw.

=== Quarter-finals ===
Team 1	Score	Team 2
Ards	1–3	Glentoran
Cliftonville	1–4	Ballymena United
Glenavon	2–1	Carrick Rangers
Linfield	4–1	Newry Town

=== Semi-finals ===
Team 1	Score	Team 2
Ballymena United	2–0^{3}	Glentoran
Glenavon	1–0	Linfield

^{3}This tie required a replay, after the first game ended as a 2–2 draw.

=== Final ===
2 May 1981

Ballymena United	1–0	Glenavon
McQuiston	Report

Windsor Park, Belfast
