= Sammy McQuiston =

Northern Irish association footballer

Personal information
- Full name: Samuel McQuiston
- Date of birth: 1954 (age 71–72)
- Positions: Midfielder; forward

Senior career*
| Years | Team | Apps | (Gls) |
| 1977–1978 | Coleraine | | |
| 1978–1983 | Ballymena United | 90 | (33) |
| 1984–1987 | Glenavon | | |
- * Club domestic league appearances and goals

Samuel McQuiston (born 1954) is a Northern Irish former association footballer who played as a midfielder and forward.

== Career ==
In the 1980–81 UEFA Cup, McQuiston scored Ballymena United's first ever goal in European competition, during a 2–1 win against East German side Vorwärts Frankfurt. Later that season, he scored the only goal of the 1980–81 Irish Cup final against Glenavon. Following a disagreement between him and caretaker manager Alex Donald in 1983, McQuiston was prepared to quit the club. And despite having talks about his future with manager Ian Russell, he left the club after he found out that Donald had been appointed as Russell's assistant. In total, he made 181 appearances for Ballymena United, scoring 72 goals, including 33 goals in 90 Irish League matches.

While at Glenavon, he scored in the final of the 1987–88 Irish League Cup against Portadown.
