= Miladin Pešterac =

Serbian footballer

Personal information
- Full name: Miladin Pešterac
- Date of birth: April 18, 1960
- Place of birth: Mrmoš, FPR Yugoslavia
- Date of death: August 21, 2007 (aged 47)
- Place of death: Kruševac, Serbia
- Position: Defender

Senior career*
Years	Team	Apps	(Gls)
1978–1982	Napredak Kruševac	85	(2)
1982–1985	Red Star Belgrade	15	(0)
1985–1986	Proleter Zrenjanin	3	(0)
1986–1987	Budućnost Titograd	16	(0)
1988	Real Burgos	14	(0)
1988–1990	Napredak Kruševac	34	(0)

Managerial career
- 1999: Napredak Kruševac
- * Club domestic league appearances and goals

Miladin Pešterac (April 18, 1960 – August 21, 2007) was a Yugoslavian and Serbian footballer.
