= Mrmoš =

- Village
- Location within Serbia
- Coordinates: 43°31′42″N 21°10′05″E
- Country: Serbia
- District: Šumadija
- Municipality: Aleksandrovac

Population (2002)
  - Total: 802
- Time zone: UTC+1 (CET)
  - Summer (DST): UTC+2 (CEST)

Mrmoš (Serbian Cyrillic: Мрмош) is a village in the municipality of Aleksandrovac, Serbia. According to the 2002 census, the village had a population of 802 people.

== See also ==
- List of places in Serbia
