= Johnny Rep =

Dutch footballer (born 1951)

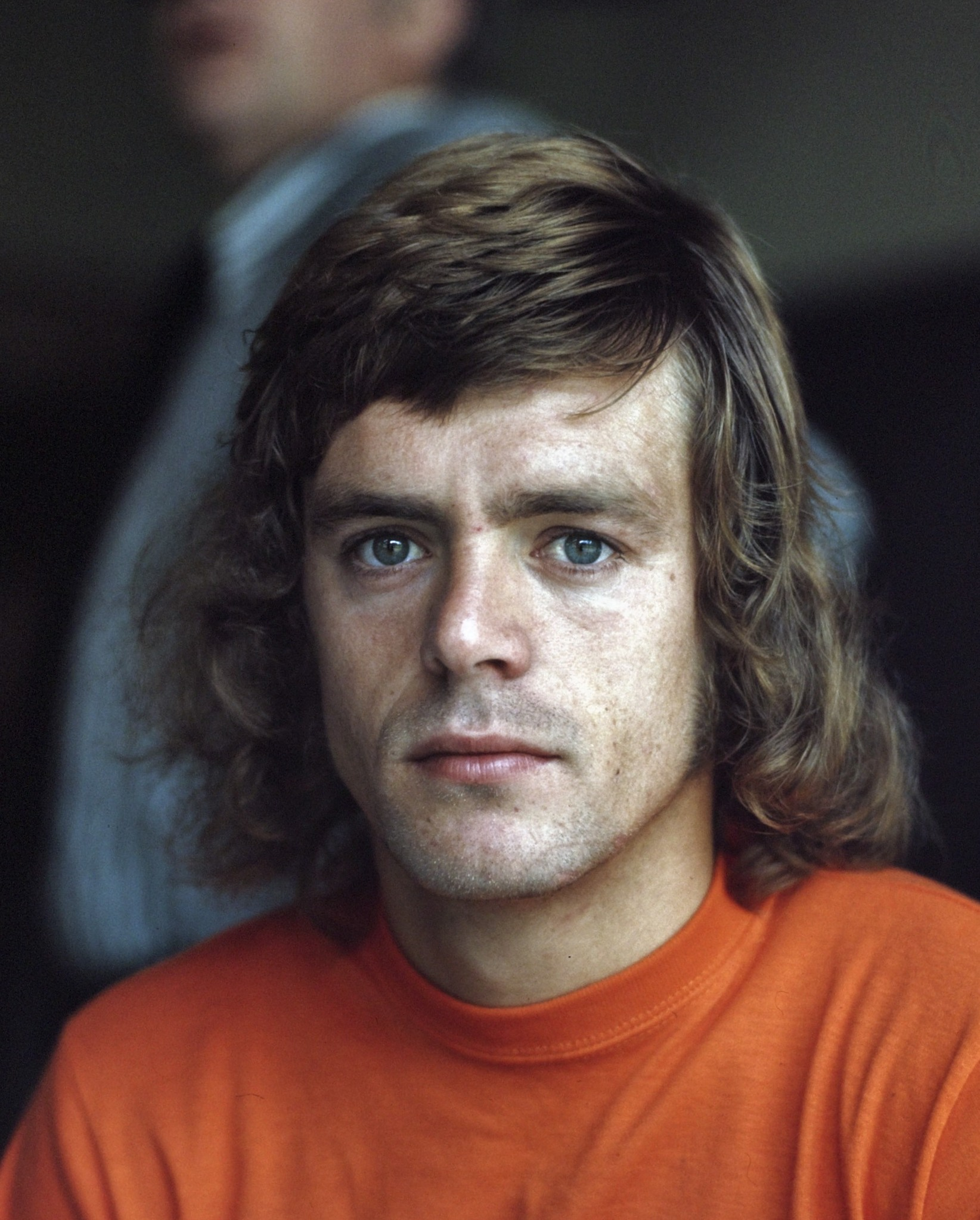
- Rep in 1974

Personal information
- Full name: John Nicholaas Rep
- Date of birth: 25 November 1951 (age 74)
- Place of birth: Zaandam, Netherlands
- Position: Right winger

Youth career
- ZFC Zaandam
- 1968-1971: Ajax

Senior career*
Years	Team	Apps	(Gls)
1971–1975	Ajax	97	(41)
1975–1977	Valencia	55	(22)
1977–1979	Bastia	65	(33)
1979–1983	Saint-Étienne	131	(44)
1983–1984	PEC Zwolle	32	(5)
1984–1986	Feyenoord	43	(5)
1986–1987	Haarlem	5	(0)
Total		428	(150)

International career
1973–1981	Netherlands	42	(12)

Managerial career
- 1994–1996: De Zwarte Schapen
- 1996–2001: Omniworld
- 2002–2005: Texel'94
- 2005–2007: Omniworld (scout)
Medal record
Men's football
Representing Netherlands
FIFA World Cup
Runner-up	1974 West Germany
Runner-up	1978 Argentina
European Championship
Third place	1976 Yugoslavia
- * Club domestic league appearances and goals

John Nicholaas Rep (born 25 November 1951) is a Dutch former professional footballer who played as a right winger. He holds the all-time record for FIFA World Cup goals for the Netherlands with 7.

== Playing career ==
Rep played as a right-footed striker in the Dutch World Cup teams of 1974 (West Germany) and 1978 (Argentina). He scored the winning goal for Ajax Amsterdam against Juventus in the 1973 European Cup Final in Belgrade and also helped SC Bastia reach the finals of the 1978 UEFA Cup. His pairing with Rob Rensenbrink was seen as an offensive powerhouse.

He said that his time at Valencia was not good and that the only thing they helped him do was "learn Spanish". He claimed that SC Bastia suited him best. After his time in Bastia, Rep joined AS Saint-Étienne and was part of a side that included Michel Platini.

== Personal life ==
He said he liked to distract himself by reading books by Harold Robbins and by playing cards.

== Career statistics ==
=== Club ===
Appearances and goals by club, season and competition
Club	Season	League			National cup (Note: Includes KNVB Cup and Coupe de France)		Europe		Other		Total	
Club	Season	Division	Apps	Goals	Apps	Goals	Apps	Goals	Apps	Goals	Apps	Goals
Ajax	1971–72	Eredivisie	9	1	0	0	2 (Note: Appearances in European Cup)	0	—		11	2
Ajax	1972–73	Eredivisie	24	17	1	0	7	1	3 (Note: One appearance and two goals in Intercontinental Cup, two appearances and one goal in European Super Cup)	3	35	21
Ajax	1973–74	Eredivisie	33	14	3	2	2	0	2 (Note: Appearances in European Super Cup)	1	40	17
Ajax	1974–75	Eredivisie	32	9	2	2	4 (Note: Appearances in UEFA Cup)	0	—		36	11
Ajax	Total		98	41	6	4	15	1	5	4	124	50
Valencia	1975–76	La Liga	26	14	0	0	—		—		26	14
Valencia	1976–77	La Liga	29	8	0	0	—		—		29	8
Valencia	Total		55	22	0	0	—		—		55	22
Bastia	1977–78	Division 1	30	18	4	1	9	4	—		43	23
Bastia	1978–79	Division 1	35	15	5	1	—		—		40	16
Bastia	Total		65	33	9	2	9	4	—		83	39
Saint-Étienne	1979–80	Division 1	31	15	7	3	8	5	—		46	23
Saint-Étienne	1980–81	Division 1	32	14	10	1	7	5	—		49	20
Saint-Étienne	1981–82	Division 1	34	8	7	1	2	0	—		43	9
Saint-Étienne	1982–83	Division 1	34	7	2	0	4	2	—		40	9
Saint-Étienne	Total		131	44	26	5	21	12	—		178	61
PEC Zwolle	1983–84	Eredivisie	31	5	2	2	—		—		33	7
Feyenoord	1984–85	Eredivisie	17	2	2	1	2	1	—		21	4
Feyenoord	1985–86	Eredivisie	26	3	3	1	2	0	—		31	4
Feyenoord	Total		43	5	5	2	4	1	0	0	52	8
Haarlem	1986–87	Eredivisie	5	0	0	0	—		—		5	0
Career total			428	150	48	15	49	18	5	4	530	187

=== International ===
Appearances and goals by national team and year
National team	Year	Apps	Goals
Netherlands	1973	3	1
Netherlands	1974	12	4
Netherlands	1975	0	0
Netherlands	1976	3	1
Netherlands	1977	4	2
Netherlands	1978	9	3
Netherlands	1979	3	0
Netherlands	1980	3	1
Netherlands	1981	5	0
Total		42	12

Scores and results list the Netherlands' goal tally first, score column indicates score after each Rep goal.

List of international goals scored by Johnny Rep
No.	Date	Venue	Opponent	Score	Result	Competition
1	2 May 1973	Olympisch Stadion, Amsterdam, Netherlands	Spain	1–0	3–2	Friendly
2	15 June 1974	Niedersachsenstadion, Hannover, Germany	Uruguay	1–0	2–0	1974 FIFA World Cup
3	15 June 1974	Niedersachsenstadion, Hannover, Germany	Uruguay	2–0	2–0	1974 FIFA World Cup
4	23 June 1974	Westfalenstadion, Dortmund, Germany	Bulgaria	3–0	4–1	1974 FIFA World Cup
5	26 June 1974	Parkstadion, Gelsenkirchen, Germany	Argentina	3–0	4–0	1974 FIFA World Cup
6	22 May 1976	Heysel Stadium, Brussels, Belgium	Belgium	1–1	2–1	UEFA Euro 1976 qualification
7	26 March 1977	Bosuil Stadium, Antwerp, Belgium	Belgium	1–0	2–0	1978 FIFA World Cup qualification
8	31 August 1977	Goffertstadion, Nijmegen, Netherlands	Iceland	3–0	4–1	1978 FIFA World Cup qualification
9	11 June 1978	Estadio Malvinas Argentinas, Mendoza, Argentina	Scotland	2–3	2–3	1978 FIFA World Cup
10	14 June 1978	Estadio Córdoba, Córdoba, Argentina	Austria	3–0	5–1	1978 FIFA World Cup
11	14 June 1978	Estadio Córdoba, Córdoba, Argentina	Austria	4–0	5–1	1978 FIFA World Cup
12	14 June 1980	Stadio San Paolo, Naples, Italy	West Germany	1–3	2–3	UEFA Euro 1980

== Honours ==
Ajax

- Eredivisie: 1971–72, 1972–73
- European Cup: 1971–72, 1972–73
- European Super Cup: 1972, 1973
- Intercontinental Cup: 1972

Bastia

- UEFA Cup runner-up: 1977–78

Saint-Étienne

- French Division 1: 1980–81

Netherlands

- FIFA World Cup runner-up: 1974, 1978
- UEFA European Championship third place: 1976
- Tournoi de Paris: 1978

Individual

- French Division 1 Foreign Player of the Year: 1977–78

== Trivia ==
Rep is included in the "Classic Netherlands" team in the football video game Pro Evolution Soccer 6 under the name of "Rak".

Rep is the namesake of the Irish indie pop band Jonny Rep.

He also has a song named in his honour, written by French rock band Mickey 3D, who hail from Saint Etienne. In 2024, Wilfred Genee released the single Johnny Rep, an adaptation of the single Johnny Däpp by Austrian DJ Lorenz Büffel.

== See also ==
- List of FIFA World Cup top goalscorers
