= Bernd Klotz =

German footballer and coach

Personal information
- Date of birth: 8 September 1958 (age 68)
- Place of birth: Pforzheim, West Germany
- Height: 1.83 m (6 ft 0 in)
- Position: Striker

Senior career*
Years	Team	Apps	(Gls)
1978–1981	VfB Stuttgart	54	(13)
1981–1984	Borussia Dortmund	106	(27)
1985–1988	SV Waldhof Mannheim	68	(13)
1988–1991	Fortuna Düsseldorf	44	(11)
1991–1992	Fortuna Köln	14	(1)

Managerial career
- 2002: Union Solingen
- 2007–2008: SpVgg Germania Ratingen 04/19
- * Club domestic league appearances and goals

Bernd Klotz (born 8 September 1958 in Pforzheim) is a German football coach and a former player.

== Honours ==
- Bundesliga: runner-up 1978–79
- (2.Bundesliga): Champions and promotion to Bundesliga (1988-89)
