= Horst Krautzig =

German footballer

Personal information
- Date of birth: 6 June 1952 (age 74)
- Place of birth: Germany
- Position: Midfielder

Senior career*
Years	Team	Apps	(Gls)
1970–1972	FC Energie Cottbus		
1972–1976	Vorwärts Frankfurt/Oder	91	(10)
1976–1979	FC Energie Cottbus		
1979–1984	Vorwärts Frankfurt/Oder	70	(9)
1984–1985	FC Energie Cottbus		
- * Club domestic league appearances and goals

Horst Krautzig (born 6 June 1952, in Germany) is a retired German footballer who played as a midfielder.
