= Laurent Paganelli =

French footballer (born 1962)

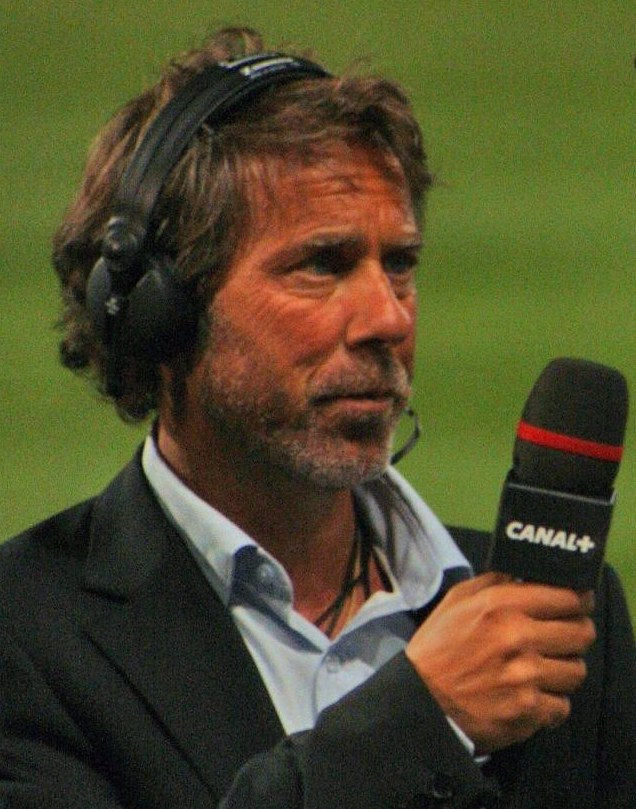
- Paganelli in 2008

Personal information
- Date of birth: 20 October 1962 (age 64)
- Place of birth: Aubenas, France
- Height: 1.66 m (5 ft 5 in)
- Position: Striker

Youth career
- MJC Avignon

Senior career*
Years	Team	Apps	(Gls)
1978–1983	Saint-Étienne	64	(12)
1983–1988	Toulon	100	(16)
1988–1989	Grenoble	8	(1)
1990–1991	Olympique Avignonnais	24	(2)
1991–1992	Nyonnais		
- * Club domestic league appearances and goals

Laurent Paganelli (born 20 October 1962) is a French former professional footballer who played as a striker. He works as a journalist (consultant) for Canal + since 1997. He is the second youngest player to ever feature in the French Division 1, behind Kalman Gerencseri.

== Honours ==
Saint-Étienne

- French Division 1: 1980–81
- Coupe de France runner-up: 1980–81, 1981–82
