= Stadion der Freundschaft (Frankfurt (Oder)) =

Football stadium in Frankfurt (Oder), Germany

Stadion der Freundschaft
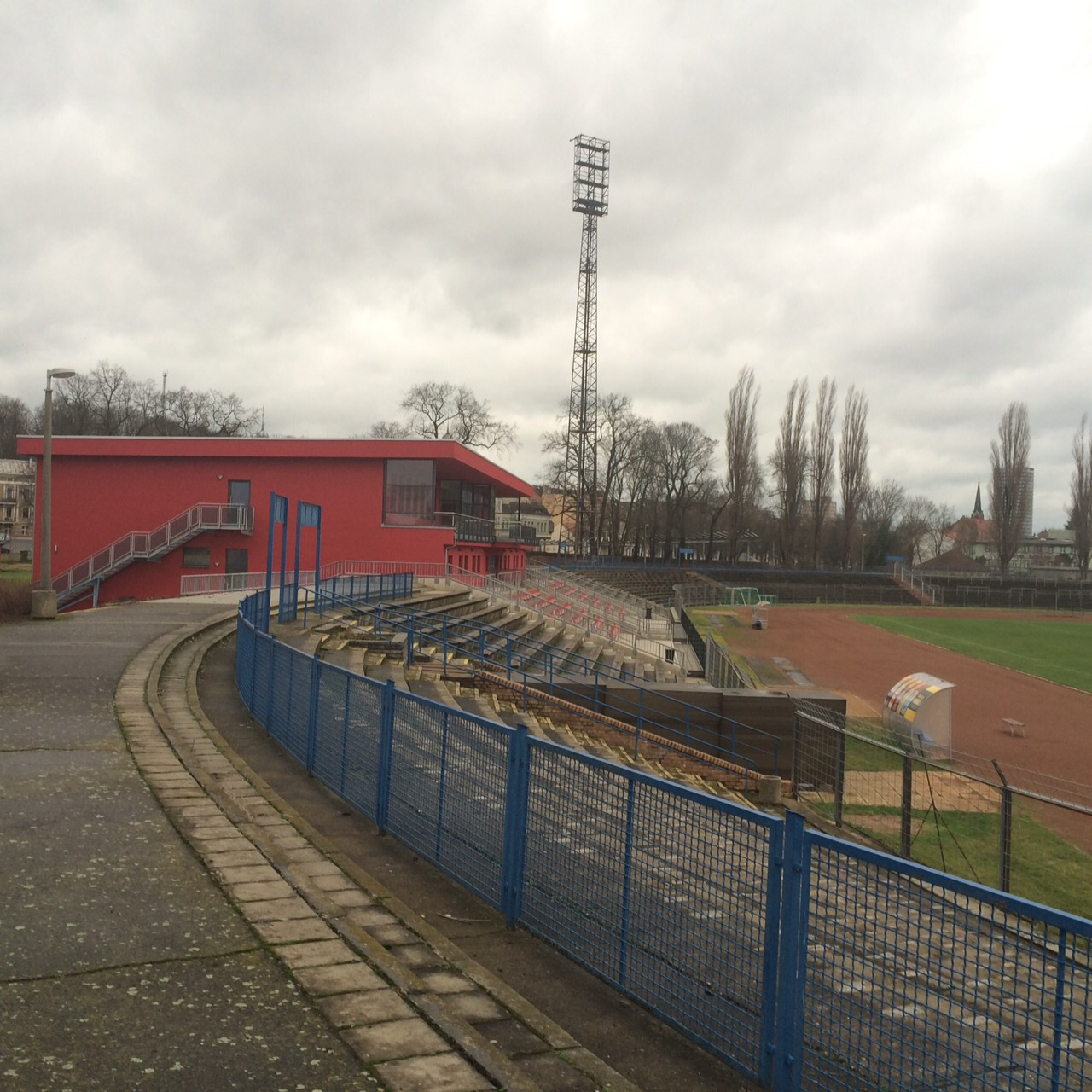
- The stadium's interior
- Interactive map of Stadion der Freundschaft
- Location: Frankfurt (Oder), Germany
- Coordinates: 52°19′57.12″N 14°33′22.08″E
- Owner: City of Frankfurt (Oder)
- Capacity: 12,000
- Surface: Grass
- Record attendance: 25,000 (SG Dynamo Frankfurt-Gwardia-Wisła Kraków, 15 July 1953)

Construction
- Built: 1948–1953
- Opened: 12 July 1953

Tenants
- 1. FC Frankfurt (1971–); FSG Dynamo Frankfurt (1953–1971)

Stadion der Freundschaft ("Stadium of Friendship") is a multi-purpose stadium in Frankfurt (Oder), Germany, with a capacity of 12,000.

== History ==
The stadium was built in commemoration of the 700th anniversary of the city of Frankfurt (Oder). The opening game in the stadium was a match between SG Dynamo Frankfurt and Gwardia-Wisła Kraków on 15 July 1953 in front of a record 25,000 fans.

=== International matches ===
Before German reunification, the Stadion der Freundschaft hosted two friendlies of the East Germany national football team. After the fall of the Berlin Wall, the German Football Association staged two qualifying games for the UEFA European Under-21 Championships.

Date	Team #1	Result	Team #2	Type	Attendance	Ref.
9 October 1974	East Germany	2–0	Canada	Friendly	2,000	
17 April 1985	East Germany	1–0	Norway	Friendly	6,000	
14 November 1995	Germany U-21	7–0	Bulgaria U-21	EC-Q	9,300	
5 September 1997	Germany U-21	1–1	Portugal U-21	EC-Q	8,000	

=== Athletics ===
On 22 September 1968, the East German athlete Margitta Gummel recorded a shot put world record (18.87 metres) at the Stadion der Freundschaft.

== Current status ==
Nowadays the stadium is in a state of disrepair. The original floodlights as well as the scoreboard had to be taken down in 2000 due to a public safety risk.
